= 2013 Southeastern Conference football season =

- League: NCAA Division I FBS
- Sport: football
- Duration: August 29, 2013 through January 2014
- Teams: 14

2014 NFL Draft
- Top draft pick: Jadeveon Clowney (South Carolina)
- Picked by: Houston Texans, 1st overall

Regular season
- East champions: Missouri
- East runners-up: South Carolina
- West champions: Auburn
- West runners-up: Alabama

SEC Championship Game
- Champions: Auburn
- Runners-up: Missouri

Football seasons
- 2012 2014

2013 Southeastern Conference football standings
	Conf.			Overall
Team	W		L	W		L
Eastern Division
No. 5 Missouri x	7	–	1	12	–	2
No. 4 South Carolina	6	–	2	11	–	2
Georgia	5	–	3	8	–	5
No. 24 Vanderbilt	4	–	4	9	–	4
Florida	3	–	5	4	–	8
Tennessee	2	–	6	5	–	7
Kentucky	0	–	8	2	–	10
Western Division
No. 2 Auburn xy$	7	–	1	12	–	2
No. 7 Alabama x%	7	–	1	11	–	2
No. 14 LSU *	5	–	3	10	–	3
No. 18 Texas A&M	4	–	4	9	–	4
Mississippi State	3	–	5	7	–	6
Ole Miss *	3	–	5	8	–	5
Arkansas	0	–	8	3	–	9
Championship: Auburn 59, Missouri 42
$ – BCS representative as conference champion; % – BCS at-large representative; x – Division champion/co-champions; y – Championship game participant; * LSU and Ole Miss vacated all wins (except for Ole Miss' Music City Bowl win) due to NCAA violations.; Rankings from AP Poll

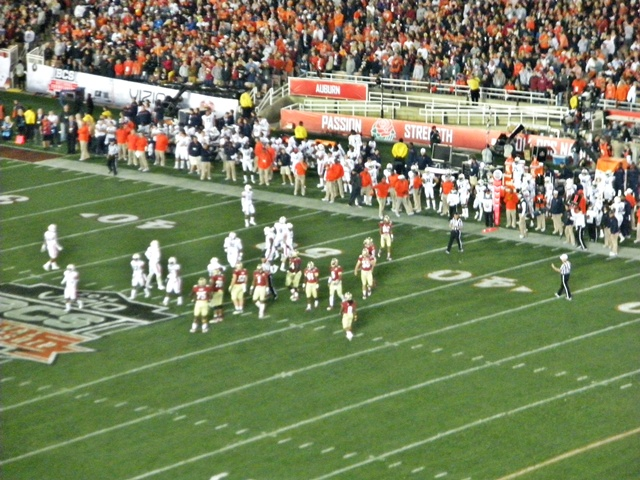
The Florida State Seminoles defeated the Auburn Tigers at the Rose Bowl, Pasadena, California

The 2013 Southeastern Conference football season began on August 29 with Ole Miss visiting Vanderbilt, and will conclude with the Allstate Sugar Bowl and/or the BCS National Championship Game in early January. The 2013 season was considered to be a "bridge" season and was not based on any past or future formatting. New inter-division rivalry games between Texas A&M-South Carolina and Arkansas-Missouri did not take place until the 2014 season.

== Preseason ==
=== Preseason All-SEC ===
2013 Pre-season Coaches All-SEC

First team offense
Position	Player	Class	Team
QB	Aaron Murray	Sr.	Georgia
RB	T. J. Yeldon	So.	Alabama
RB	Todd Gurley	So.	Georgia
WR	Amari Cooper	So.	Alabama
WR	Jordan Matthews	Sr.	Vanderbilt
TE	Arthur Lynch	Sr.	Georgia
OL	Cyrus Kouandjio	Jr.	Alabama
OL	Jake Matthews	Sr.	Texas A&M
OL	Anthony Steen	Sr.	Alabama
OL	Gabe Jackson	Sr.	Mississippi State
C	Travis Swanson	Sr.	Arkansas

First team defense
Position	Player	Class	Team
DL	Jadeveon Clowney	Jr.	South Carolina
DL	Dominique Easley	Sr.	Florida
DL	Anthony Johnson	Jr.	LSU
DL	Chris Smith	Sr.	Arkansas
LB	Denzel Nkemdiche	So.	Ole Miss
LB	C. J. Mosley	Sr.	Alabama
LB	A. J. Johnson	Jr.	Tennessee
DB	Ha Ha Clinton-Dix	Jr.	Alabama
DB	Deion Belue	Sr.	Alabama
DB	Loucheiz Purifoy	Jr.	Florida
DB	Craig Loston	Sr.	LSU

First Team Special Teams
Position	Player	Class	Team
P	Kyle Christy	Jr.	Florida
K	Carey Spear	Sr.	Vanderbilt
RS	Odell Beckham	Jr.	LSU
All-purpose	Bruce Ellington	Jr.	South Carolina

== Rankings ==
Legend
	Increase in ranking
	Decrease in ranking
	Not ranked previous week
RV	Received votes

		(Pre)	Sept. 3	Sept. 10	Sept. 17	Sept. 24	Oct. 1	Oct. 8	Oct. 15	Oct. 22	Oct. 29	Nov. 5	Nov. 12	Nov. 19	Nov. 26	Dec. 3	Dec. 10	Final
Alabama	AP	1	1	1	1	1	1	1	1	1	1	1	1	1	1	4	3	7
Alabama	C	1	1	1	1	1	1	1	1	1	1	1	1	1	1	4	3	8
Alabama	BCS	Not released								1	1	1	1	1	1	4	3	
Arkansas	AP		RV		RV													
Arkansas	C	RV	RV	RV	RV													
Arkansas	BCS	Not released																
Auburn	AP				RV			RV	24	11	8	7	7	6	4	3	2	2
Auburn	C				RV			RV	RV	17	11	10	9	7	5	3	2	2
Auburn	BCS	Not released								11	11	9	7	6	4	3	2	
Florida	AP	10	12	18	19	20	18	17	22	RV	RV							
Florida	C	10	9	20	18	19	19	17	22	RV	RV							
Florida	BCS	Not released																
Georgia	AP	5	11	9	9	9	6	7	15	RV	RV	RV	25	RV	RV	25	23	RV
Georgia	C	5	12	10	10	10	6	7	16	RV	RV	RV	RV	RV	RV	RV	24	RV
Georgia	BCS	Not released											24				22	
Kentucky	AP																	
Kentucky	C																	
Kentucky	BCS	Not released																
LSU	AP	12	9	8	6	6	10	10	6	13	11	10	18	18	15	14	14	14
LSU	C	13	11	8	7	6	11	11	8	14	13	12	18	19	15	14	14	14
LSU	BCS	Not released								13	13	13	21	22	17	15	16	
Mississippi State	AP																	RV
Mississippi State	C	RV																
Mississippi State	BCS	Not released																
Missouri	AP					RV	RV	25	14	5	10	9	9	8	5	5	9	5
Missouri	C		RV			RV	RV	RV	14	7	10	9	8	8	6	5	9	5
Missouri	BCS	Not released								5	9	8	9	8	5	5	8	
Ole Miss	AP	RV	RV	25	21	21	24	RV	RV	RV	RV	RV	RV	25	RV			RV
Ole Miss	C	RV	RV	25	22	21	RV	RV	RV	RV	RV	RV	RV	RV				RV
Ole Miss	BCS	Not released												24				
South Carolina	AP	6	6	13	12	12	13	14	11	20	14	13	11	12	10	8	8	4
South Carolina	C	7	6	14	13	13	12	12	9	20	16	15	12	11	9	7	8	4
South Carolina	BCS	Not released								21	14	12	10	11	10	8	9	
Tennessee	AP		RV	RV														
Tennessee	C	RV	RV	RV						RV								
Tennessee	BCS	Not released																
Texas A&M	AP	7	7	6	10	10	9	9	7	14	12	11	10	9	19	22	20	18
Texas A&M	C	6	7	6	9	9	9	9	7	15	14	13	11	10	21	25	21	18
Texas A&M	BCS	Not released								16	12	15	11	12	21	24	21	
Vanderbilt	AP	RV													RV	RV	RV	24
Vanderbilt	C	RV													RV	RV	RV	23
Vanderbilt	BCS	Not released																

== Regular season ==
Index to colors and formatting
Non-conference matchup; SEC member won
Non-conference matchup; SEC member lost
Conference matchup

All times Eastern time. SEC teams in bold.

Rankings reflect that of the AP poll for that week until week eight when the BCS rankings will be used.

=== Week One ===
Date	Time	Visiting team	Home team	Site	Broadcast	Result	Attendance	Reference
August 29	6:00 pm	North Carolina	#6 **South Carolina**	Williams-Brice Stadium • Columbia, South Carolina	ESPN	**W** 27–10	81,572	
August 29	9:15 pm	**Ole Miss**	**Vanderbilt**	Vanderbilt Stadium • Nashville, Tennessee	ESPN2	**Miss** 39–35	40,350	
August 31	12:21 pm	Toledo	#10 **Florida**	Ben Hill Griffin Stadium • Gainesville, Florida	SECN	**W** 24–6	83,604	
August 31	1:00 pm	Rice	#7 **Texas A&M**	Kyle Field • College Station, Texas	ESPN	**W** 52–31	86,686	
August 31	3:30 pm	**Mississippi State**	#13 Oklahoma State	Reliant Stadium • Houston, Texas	ESPN2	**L** 3–21	35,874	
August 31	4:00 pm	Louisiana–Lafayette	**Arkansas**	Donald W. Reynolds Razorback Stadium • Fayetteville, Arkansas	FSN	**W** 34–14	69,801	
August 31	5:30 pm	Virginia Tech	#1 **Alabama**	Georgia Dome • Atlanta (Chick-fil-A Kickoff Game)	ESPN	**W** 35–10	73,114	
August 31	6:00 pm	Austin Peay	**Tennessee**	Neyland Stadium • Knoxville, Tennessee	TBD	**W** 45–0	97,169	
August 31	7:00 pm	Murray State	**Missouri**	Faurot Field • Columbia, Missouri	ESPN3	**W** 58–14	58,038	
August 31	7:00 pm	**Kentucky**	Western Kentucky	LP Field • Nashville, Tennessee	ESPNews	**L** 26–35	46,723	
August 31	7:00 pm	Washington State	**Auburn**	Jordan–Hare Stadium • Auburn, Alabama	ESPNU	**W** 31–24	85,095	
August 31	8:00 pm	#5 **Georgia**	#8 Clemson	Memorial Stadium • Clemson, South Carolina	ABC	**L** 35–38	83,830	
August 31	9:00 pm	#12 **LSU**	#20 TCU	AT&T Stadium • Arlington, Texas (Cowboys Classic)	ESPN	**W** 37–27	80,230	

Players of the week:

Offensive		Defensive		Special teams	
Player	Team	Player	Team	Player	Team
Todd Gurley	Georgia	Robinson Therezie	Auburn	Christion Jones	Alabama

=== Week Two ===
Date	Time	Visiting team	Home team	Site	Broadcast	Result	Attendance	Reference
September 7	12:00 pm	#12 **Florida**	Miami (FL)	Sun Life Stadium • Miami, Florida	ESPN	**L** 16–21	76,968	
September 7	12:00 pm	Miami (OH)	**Kentucky**	Commonwealth Stadium • Lexington, Kentucky	FSN	**W** 41–7	54,846	
September 7	12:21 pm	WKU	**Tennessee**	Neyland Stadium • Knoxville, Tennessee	SECN	**W** 52–20	86,783	
September 7	3:30 pm	Toledo	**Missouri**	Faurot Field • Columbia, Missouri	ESPNU	**W** 38–23	56,785	
September 7	3:30 pm	Alcorn State	**Mississippi State**	Davis Wade Stadium • Starkville, Mississippi	ESPN3	**W** 51–7	55,085	
September 7	4:30 pm	#6 **South Carolina**	#11 **Georgia**	Sanford Stadium • Athens, Georgia	ESPN	**UGA** 41–30	92,746	
September 7	7:00 pm	UAB	#9 **LSU**	Tiger Stadium • Baton Rouge LA	ESPNU	**W** 56–17	90,037	
September 7	7:00 pm	Samford	**Arkansas**	War Memorial Stadium • Little Rock, Arkansas	ESPN3	**W** 31–21	47,358	
September 7	7:00 pm	Sam Houston State	#7 **Texas A&M**	Kyle Field • College Station, Texas	ESPN3	**W** 65–28	86,800	
September 7	7:00 pm	Southeast Missouri State	**Ole Miss**	Vaught–Hemingway Stadium • Oxford, Mississippi	ESPN3	**W** 31–13	60,815	
September 7	7:30 pm	Austin Peay	**Vanderbilt**	Vanderbilt Stadium • Nashville, Tennessee	ESPN3	**W** 38–3	33,162	
September 7	7:30 pm	Arkansas State	**Auburn**	Jordan–Hare Stadium • Auburn, Alabama	FSN	**W** 38–9	83,246	

Players of the week:

Offensive		Defensive		Special teams	
Player	Team	Player	Team	Player	Team
Aaron Murray	Georgia	Brian Randolph	Tennessee	Odell Beckham	LSU

=== Week Three ===
Date	Time	Visiting team	Home team	Site	Broadcast	Result	Attendance	Reference
September 14	12:00 pm	#7 Louisville	**Kentucky**	Commonwealth Stadium • Lexington, Kentucky	ESPN	**L** 13–27	65,445	
September 14	12:21 pm	Southern Miss	**Arkansas**	Donald W. Reynolds Razorback Stadium • Fayetteville, Arkansas	SECN	**W** 24–3	63,067	
September 14	3:30 pm	**Tennessee**	#2 Oregon	Autzen Stadium • Eugene, Oregon	ABC	**L** 14–59	57,895	
September 14	3:30 pm	#1 **Alabama**	#6 **Texas A&M**	Kyle Field • College Station, Texas	CBS	**ALA** 49–42	87,596	
September 14	7:00 pm	**Vanderbilt**	#13 **South Carolina**	Williams-Brice Stadium • Columbia, South Carolina	ESPN	**SCAR** 35–25	81,371	
September 14	7:00 pm	**Mississippi State**	**Auburn**	Jordan–Hare Stadium • Auburn, Alabama	ESPN2	**AUB** 24–20	85,817	
September 14	7:00 pm	Kent State	#8 **LSU**	Tiger Stadium • Baton Rouge LA	ESPNU	**W** 45–13	89,113	
September 14	8:00 pm	#25 **Ole Miss**	Texas	Darrell K Royal–Texas Memorial Stadium • Austin, Texas	LHN	**W** 44–23	101,474	

Players of the week:

Offensive		Defensive		Special teams	
Player	Team	Player	Team	Player	Team
A. J. McCarron	Alabama	Ego Ferguson	LSU	Jeff Scott	Ole Miss

=== Week Four ===
Date	Time	Visiting team	Home team	Site	Broadcast	Result	Attendance	Reference
September 21	12:00 pm	**Vanderbilt**	Massachusetts	Gillette Stadium • Foxborough, Massachusetts	ESPNU	**W** 24–7	16,419	
September 21	12:21 pm	North Texas	#9 **Georgia**	Sanford Stadium • Athens, Georgia	SECN	**W** 45–21	92,746	
September 21	3:30 pm	**Tennessee**	#19 **Florida**	Ben Hill Griffin Stadium • Gainesville, Florida	CBS	**FLA** 31–17	90,074	
September 21	3:30 pm	**Arkansas**	Rutgers	High Point Solutions Stadium • Piscataway, New Jersey	ESPN/2/U	**L** 24–28	51,969	
September 21	7:00 pm	Colorado State	#1 **Alabama**	Bryant–Denny Stadium • Tuscaloosa, Alabama	ESPN2/U	**W** 31–6	101,821	
September 21	7:00 pm	SMU	#10 **Texas A&M**	Kyle Field • College Station, Texas	ESPN2/U	**W** 42–13	86,542	
September 21	7:30 pm	Troy	**Mississippi State**	Davis Wade Stadium • Starkville, Mississippi	FSN	**W** 62–7	55,096	
September 21	7:45 pm	**Auburn**	#6 **LSU**	Tiger Stadium • Baton Rouge LA	ESPN	**LSU** 35–21	92,368	
September 21	8:00 pm	**Missouri**	Indiana	Memorial Stadium • Bloomington, Indiana	BTN	**W** 45–28	49,149	

Players of the week:

Offensive		Defensive		Special teams	
Player	Team	Player	Team	Player	Team

=== Week Five ===
Date	Time	Visiting team	Home team	Site	Broadcast	Result	Attendance	Reference
September 28	12:00 pm	#12 **South Carolina**	UCF	Bright House Networks Stadium • Orlando, Florida	ABC	**W** 28–25	47,605	
September 28	12:21 pm	South Alabama	**Tennessee**	Neyland Stadium • Knoxville, Tennessee	SECN	**W** 31–24	87,266	
September 28	3:30 pm	#6 **LSU**	#9 **Georgia**	Sanford Stadium • Athens, Georgia	CBS	**UGA** 44–41	92,746	
September 28	6:30 pm	#21 **Ole Miss**	#1 **Alabama**	Bryant–Denny Stadium • Tuscaloosa, Alabama	ESPN	**ALA** 25–0	101,821	
September 28	7:00 pm	#10 **Texas A&M**	**Arkansas**	Donald W. Reynolds Razorback Stadium • Fayetteville, Arkansas	ESPN2	**TAMU** 45–33	72,613	
September 28	7:00 pm	#20 **Florida**	**Kentucky**	Commonwealth Stadium • Lexington, Kentucky	ESPNU	**FLA** 24–7	62,076	
September 28	7:30 pm	Arkansas State	**Missouri**	Faurot Field • Columbia, Missouri	CSS	**W** 41–19	62,468	
September 28	7:30 pm	UAB	**Vanderbilt**	Vanderbilt Stadium • Nashville, Tennessee	FSN	**W** 52–24	32,467	

Players of the week:

Offensive		Defensive		Special teams	
Player	Team	Player	Team	Player	Team

=== Week Six ===
Date	Time	Visiting team	Home team	Site	Broadcast	Result	Attendance	Reference
October 5	12:21 pm	Georgia State	#1 **Alabama**	Bryant–Denny Stadium • Tuscaloosa, Alabama	SEC Network	**W** 45–3	101,254	
October 5	3:30 pm	#6 **Georgia**	**Tennessee**	Neyland Stadium • Knoxville, Tennessee	CBS	**UGA** 34–31 OT	102,455	
October 5	7:00 pm	#24 **Ole Miss**	**Auburn**	Jordan–Hare Stadium • Auburn, Alabama	ESPNU	**AUB** 30–22	86,504	
October 5	7:00 pm	**Arkansas**	#18 **Florida**	Ben Hill Griffin Stadium • Gainesville, Florida	ESPN2	**FLA** 30–10	90,043	
October 5	7:00 pm	#10 **LSU**	**Mississippi State**	Davis Wade Stadium • Starkville, Mississippi	ESPN	**LSU** 59–26	57,113	
October 5	7:30 pm	**Missouri**	**Vanderbilt**	Vanderbilt Stadium • Nashville, Tennessee	CSS	**MIZZOU** 51–28	36,892	
October 5	7:30 pm	**Kentucky**	#13 **South Carolina**	Williams-Brice Stadium • Columbia, South Carolina	FSN	**SCAR** 35–28	82,313	

Players of the week:

Offensive		Defensive		Special teams	
Player	Team	Player	Team	Player	Team

=== Week Seven ===
Date	Time	Visiting team	Home team	Site	Broadcast	Result	Attendance	Reference
October 12	12:00 pm	#25 **Missouri**	#7 **Georgia**	Sanford Stadium • Athens, Georgia	ESPN	**MIZZOU** 41–26	92,746	
October 12	12:21 pm	#14 **South Carolina**	**Arkansas**	Williams-Brice Stadium • Fayetteville, Arkansas	SEC Network	**SCAR** 52–7	66,302	
October 12	2:00 pm	Western Carolina	**Auburn**	Jordan Hare Stadium • Auburn, Alabama	PPV	**W** 62–3	84,171	
October 12	3:30 pm	#17 **Florida**	#10 **LSU**	Tiger Stadium • Baton Rouge, Louisiana	CBS	**LSU** 17–6	92,980	
October 12	7:00 pm	#1 **Alabama**	**Kentucky**	Commonwealth Stadium • Lexington, Kentucky	ESPN2	**ALA** 48–7	69,873	
October 12	7:30 pm	Bowling Green	**Mississippi State**	Davis Wade Stadium • Starkville, Mississippi	ESPN3	**W** 21–20	55,148	
October 12	8:30 pm	#9 **Texas A&M**	**Ole Miss**	Vaught–Hemingway Stadium • Oxford, Mississippi	ESPN	**TAMU** 41–38	60,950	

Players of the week:

Offensive		Defensive		Special teams	
Player	Team	Player	Team	Player	Team
Johnny Manziel	Texas A&M	Kentrell Brothers	Missouri	Sam Irwin-Hill	Arkansas

=== Week Eight ===
Date	Time	Visiting team	Home team	Site	Broadcast	Result	Attendance	Reference
October 19	12:00 pm	#15 **Georgia**	**Vanderbilt**	Vanderbilt Stadium • Nashville, Tennessee	CBS	**VANDY** 31–27	40,350	
October 19	12:00 pm	#11 **South Carolina**	**Tennessee**	Neyland Stadium • Knoxville, Tennessee	ESPN	**TENN** 23–21	95,736	
October 19	12:21 pm	#22 **Florida**	#14 **Missouri**	Faurot Field • Columbia, Missouri	SEC Network	**MIZZOU** 36–17	67,124	
October 19	3:30 pm	#24 **Auburn**	#7 **Texas A&M**	Kyle Field • College Station, Texas	CBS	**AUB** 45–41	87,165	
October 19	7:00 pm	**Arkansas**	#1 **Alabama**	Bryant–Denny Stadium • Tuscaloosa, Alabama	ESPN	**ALA** 52–0	101,821	
October 19	7:00 pm	#6 **LSU**	**Ole Miss**	Vaught–Hemingway Stadium • Oxford, Mississippi	ESPN2	**MISS** 27–24	61,160	

Players of the week:

Offensive		Defensive		Special teams	
Player	Team	Player	Team	Player	Team
Nick Marshall	Auburn	Michael Sam	Missouri	Michael Palardy	Tennessee

=== Week Nine ===
Date	Time	Visiting team	Home team	Site	Broadcast	Result	Attendance	Reference
October 24	7:30 pm	**Kentucky**	**Mississippi State**	Davis Wade Stadium • Starkville, Mississippi	ESPN	**MISS ST** 28–22	55,102	
October 26	12:21 pm	**Vanderbilt**	#16 **Texas A&M**	Kyle Field • College Station, Texas	SEC Network	**TAMU** 56–24	86,584	
October 26	3:30 pm	**Tennessee**	#1 **Alabama**	Bryant–Denny Stadium • Tuscaloosa, Alabama	CBS	**ALA** 45–10	101,821	
October 26	7:00 pm	Furman	#13 **LSU**	Tiger Stadium • Baton Rouge, Louisiana	ESPN3	**W** 48–16	92,554	
October 26	7:00 pm	#21 **South Carolina**	#5 **Missouri**	Faurot Field • Columbia, Missouri	ESPN2	**SCAR** 27–24 2OT	67,124	
October 26	7:30 pm	FAU	#11 **Auburn**	Jordan–Hare Stadium • Auburn, Alabama	ESPN3	**W** 45–10	85,517	
October 26	7:30 pm	Idaho	**Ole Miss**	Vaught–Hemingway Stadium • Oxford, Mississippi	ESPN3	**W** 59–14	57,870	

Players of the week:

Offensive		Defensive		Special teams	
Player	Team	Player	Team	Player	Team

=== Week Ten ===
Date	Time	Visiting team	Home team	Site	Broadcast	Result	Attendance	Reference
November 2	12:21 pm	**Mississippi State**	#14 **South Carolina**	Williams Brice Stadium • Columbia, South Carolina	SEC Network	**SCAR** 34–16	82,111	
November 2	3:30 pm	**Georgia**	**Florida**	EverBank Field • Jacksonville, Florida	CBS	**UGA** 23–20	84,693	
November 2	6:00 pm	#11 **Auburn**	**Arkansas**	Donald W. Reynolds Razorback Stadium • Fayetteville, Arkansas	ESPN2	**AUB** 35–17	66,835	
November 2	7:00 pm	**Tennessee**	#10 **Missouri**	Faurot Field • Columbia, Missouri	ESPN	**MIZZOU** 31–3	65,869	
November 2	7:30 pm	Alabama State	**Kentucky**	Commonwealth Stadium • Lexington, Kentucky	ESPN3	**W** 48–14	53,797	
November 2	9:00 pm	UTEP	#12 **Texas A&M**	Kyle Field • College Station, Texas	ESPN2	**W** 57–7	87,126	

Players of the week:

Offensive		Defensive		Special teams	
Player	Team	Player	Team	Player	Team

=== Week Eleven ===
Date	Time	Visiting team	Home team	Site	Broadcast	Result	Attendance	Reference
November 9	12:00 pm	**Vanderbilt**	**Florida**	Ben Hill Griffin Stadium • Gainesville, Florida	ESPNU	**VANDY** 34–17	88,004	
November 9	12:00 pm	#8 **Missouri**	**Kentucky**	Commonwealth Stadium • Lexington, Kentucky	ESPNU	**MIZZOU** 48–17	55,280	
November 9	12:00 pm	#9 **Auburn**	**Tennessee**	Neyland Stadium • Knoxville, Tennessee	ESPN	**AUB** 55–23	102,455	
November 9	12:21 pm	**Arkansas**	**Ole Miss**	Vaught–Hemingway Stadium • Oxford, Mississippi	SEC Network	**MISS** 34–24	60,856	
November 9	12:30 pm	Appalachian State	**Georgia**	Sanford Stadium • Athens, Georgia	ESPN3	**W** 45–6	92,746	
November 9	3:30 pm	**Mississippi State**	#15 **Texas A&M**	Kyle Field • College Station, Texas	CBS	**TAMU** 51–41	88,504	
November 9	8:00 pm	#13 **LSU**	#1 **Alabama**	Bryant–Denny Stadium • Tuscaloosa, Alabama	CBS	**ALA** 38–17	101,821	

Players of the week:

Offensive		Defensive		Special teams	
Player	Team	Player	Team	Player	Team

=== Week Twelve ===
Date	Time	Visiting team	Home team	Site	Broadcast	Result	Attendance	Reference
November 16	12:00 pm	Troy	**Ole Miss**	Vaught–Hemingway Stadium • Oxford, Mississippi	ESPNU	**W** 51–21	52,931	
November 16	12:21 pm	**Kentucky**	**Vanderbilt**	Vanderbilt Stadium • Nashville, Tennessee	SEC Network	**VANDY** 22–6	33,488	
November 16	3:30 pm	#25 **Georgia**	#7 **Auburn**	Jordan–Hare Stadium • Auburn, Alabama	CBS	**AUB** 43–38	87,451	
November 16	7:00 pm	**Florida**	#10 **South Carolina**	Williams Brice Stadium • Columbia, South Carolina	ESPN2	**SCAR** 19–14	83,853	
November 16	7:30 pm	#1 **Alabama**	**Mississippi State**	Davis Wade Stadium • Starkville, Mississippi	ESPN	**ALA** 20–7	57,211	

Players of the week:

Offensive		Defensive		Special teams	
Player	Team	Player	Team	Player	Team

=== Week Thirteen ===
Date	Time	Visiting team	Home team	Site	Broadcast	Result	Attendance	Reference
November 23	12:21 pm	**Mississippi State**	**Arkansas**	War Memorial Stadium • Little Rock, Arkansas	SEC Network	**MISS ST** 24–17 OT	45,198	
November 23	1:00 pm	Coast Carolina	#12 **South Carolina**	Williams Brice Stadium • Columbia, South Carolina	ESPN3	**W** 70–10	81,411	
November 23	2:00 pm	Georgia Southern	**Florida**	Ben Hill Griffin Stadium • Gainesville, Florida	ESPN3	**L** 20–26	82,459	
November 23	2:00 pm	Chattanooga	#1 **Alabama**	Bryant–Denny Stadium • Tuscaloosa, Alabama	ESPN3	**W** 49–0	100,179	
November 23	3:30 pm	#9 **Texas A&M**	#18 **LSU**	Tiger Stadium • Baton Rouge, Louisiana	CBS	**LSU** 34–10	92,949	
November 23	7:00 pm	**Kentucky**	**Georgia**	Sanford Stadium • Athens, Georgia	ESPNU	**UGA** 59–17	92,746	
November 23	7:00 pm	**Vanderbilt**	**Tennessee**	Neyland Stadium • Knoxville, Tennessee	ESPN2	**VANDY** 14–10	97,223	
November 23	7:45 pm	#8 **Missouri**	#24 **Ole Miss**	Vaught–Hemingway Stadium • Oxford, Mississippi	ESPN	**MIZZOU** 24–10	61,168	

Players of the week:

Offensive		Defensive		Special teams	
Player	Team	Player	Team	Player	Team

=== Week Fourteen ===
Date	Time	Visiting team	Home team	Site	Broadcast	Result	Attendance	Reference
November 28	7:30 pm	**Ole Miss**	**Mississippi State**	Davis Wade Stadium • Starkville, Mississippi	ESPN	**MISS ST** 17–10 OT	55,113	
November 29	2:30 pm	**Arkansas**	#17 **LSU**	Tiger Stadium • Baton Rouge, Louisiana	CBS	**LSU** 31–27	89,656	
November 30	12:00 pm	#2 Florida State	**Florida**	Ben Hill Griffin Stadium • Gainesville, Florida	ESPN	**L** 7–37	90,458	
November 30	12:21 pm	Wake Forest	**Vanderbilt**	Vanderbilt Stadium • Nashville, Tennessee	SEC Network	**W** 23–21	33,019	
November 30	3:30 pm	#1 **Alabama**	#4 **Auburn**	Jordan–Hare Stadium • Auburn, Alabama	CBS	**AUB** 34–28	87,451	
November 30	3:30 pm	**Georgia**	Georgia Tech	Bobby Dodd Stadium • Atlanta	ABC	**W** 41–34 2OT	54,914	
November 30	7:00 pm	**Tennessee**	**Kentucky**	Commonwealth Stadium • Lexington, Kentucky	ESPNU	**TENN** 27–14	54,986	
November 30	7:00 pm	#6 Clemson	#10 **South Carolina**	Williams-Brice Stadium • Columbia, South Carolina	ESPN2	**W** 31–17	84,174	
November 30	7:45 pm	#21 **Texas A&M**	#5 **Missouri**	Faurot Field • Columbia, Missouri	ESPN	**MIZZOU** 28–21	67,124	

Players of the week:

Offensive		Defensive		Special teams	
Player	Team	Player	Team	Player	Team

=== SEC Championship ===
Date	Time	Visiting team	Home team	Site	Broadcast	Result	Attendance	Reference
December 7	4:00 pm	#5 **Missouri**	#3 **Auburn**	Georgia Dome • Atlanta, Georgia (2013 SEC Championship Game)	CBS	**AUB** 59–42	75,632	

== SEC vs AQ-conference matchups ==
This is a list of the BCS-league teams the SEC plays in the non-conference (Rankings from the AP Poll):

Date	Visitor	Home	Site	Significance	Score
August 29	North Carolina	#6 South Carolina	Williams-Brice Stadium • Columbia, South Carolina		W 27–10
August 31	Washington State	Auburn	Jordan–Hare Stadium • Auburn, Alabama		W 31–24
August 31	#5 Georgia	#8 Clemson	Memorial Stadium • Clemson, South Carolina	Clemson–Georgia football rivalry	L 35–38
August 31	Mississippi State	#13 Oklahoma State	Reliant Stadium • Houston, Texas		L 3–21
August 31	#12 LSU	#20 TCU	AT&T Stadium • Arlington, Texas	Cowboys Classic	W 37–27
August 31	#1 Alabama	Virginia Tech	Georgia Dome • Atlanta	Chick-fil-A Kickoff Game	W 35–10
September 7	#12 Florida	Miami (FL)	Sun Life Stadium • Miami, Florida	Florida–Miami football rivalry	L 16–21
September 14	#7 Louisville	Kentucky	Commonwealth Stadium • Lexington, Kentucky	Governor's Cup	L 13–27
September 14	Tennessee	#2 Oregon	Autzen Stadium • Eugene, Oregon		L 14–59
September 14	#25 Ole Miss	Texas	Darrell K Royal–Texas Memorial Stadium • Austin, Texas		W 44–23
September 21	Missouri	Indiana	Memorial Stadium • Bloomington, Indiana		W 45–28
September 21	Arkansas	Rutgers	High Point Solutions Stadium • Piscataway, New Jersey		L 24–28
September 21	SMU	#10 Texas A&M	Kyle Field • College Station, Texas		W 42–13
September 28	#12 South Carolina	UCF	Bright House Networks Stadium • Orlando, Florida		W 28–25
November 30	#2 Florida State	Florida	Ben Hill Griffin Stadium • Gainesville, Florida	Florida–Florida State football rivalry	L 7–37
November 30	Georgia	Georgia Tech	Bobby Dodd Stadium • Atlanta, Georgia	Clean, Old-Fashioned Hate	W 41–34
November 30	#6 Clemson	#10 South Carolina	Williams-Brice Stadium • Columbia, South Carolina	Battle of the Palmetto State	W 31–17
November 30	Wake Forest	Vanderbilt	Vanderbilt Stadium • Nashville, Tennessee		W 23–21

== Bowl games ==
(Rankings from final BCS poll)

Date	Bowl Game	Site	TV	SEC Team	Opponent	Score
January 6, 2014	BCS National Championship	Rose Bowl • Pasadena, California	ESPN	#2 Auburn	#1 Florida State	FSU 34–31
January 4, 2014	BBVA Compass Bowl	Legion Field • Birmingham, Alabama	ESPN	Vanderbilt	Houston	VANDY 41–24
January 3, 2014	Cotton Bowl Classic	AT&T Stadium • Arlington, Texas	FOX	#8 Missouri	#13 Oklahoma State	MIZZOU 41–31
January 2, 2014	Allstate Sugar Bowl	Mercedes-Benz Superdome • New Orleans	ESPN	#3 Alabama	#11 Oklahoma	OU 45–31
January 1, 2014	Capital One Bowl	Citrus Bowl • Orlando, Florida	ABC	#9 South Carolina	#19 Wisconsin	SCAR 34–24
January 1, 2014	Outback Bowl	Raymond James Stadium • Tampa, Florida	ESPN	#16 LSU	Iowa	LSU 21–14
January 1, 2014	Gator Bowl	EverBank Field • Jacksonville, Florida	ESPN2	#22 Georgia	Nebraska	NEB 24–19
December 31, 2013	Chick-fil-A Bowl	Georgia Dome • Atlanta	ESPN	#21 Texas A&M	#24 Duke	TAMU 52–48
December 31, 2013	Autozone Liberty Bowl	Liberty Bowl • Memphis, Tennessee	ESPN	Mississippi State	Rice	MISS ST 44–7
December 30, 2013	Music City Bowl	LP Field • Nashville, Tennessee	ESPN	Ole Miss	Georgia Tech	MISS 25–17

== Awards and honors ==
=== All-SEC Teams ===
The Southeastern Conference coaches voted for the All-SEC teams after the regular season concluded. Prior to the 2013 SEC Championship Game the teams were released. Alabama placed the most representatives on the 2013 All-Southeastern Conference Coaches’ Football Team, the league office announced Tuesday. Alabama had nine total members, including a league-leading five representatives on the first team. LSU followed with eight total selections.

Twelve of the 14 SEC schools had a member on the first-team All-SEC squad. Alabama led with five, followed by Texas A&M with four. Georgia and SEC Champion Auburn each placed three total members on the first team. Every SEC school was represented by at least one member on the All-SEC teams, including seven institutions with four or more All-SEC selections each.

Coaches were not permitted to vote for their own players.

Position	1st Team		2nd Team	
Position	Player	School	Player	School
QB	Johnny Manziel	Texas A&M	A. J. McCarron	Alabama
RB	Tre Mason	Auburn	Mike Davis	South Carolina
RB	T. J. Yeldon	Alabama	Jeremy Hill	LSU
WR	Mike Evans	Texas A&M	Odell Beckham Jr.	LSU
WR	Jordan Matthews	Vanderbilt	Jarvis Landry	LSU
TE	Arthur Lynch	Georgia	Malcolm Johnson	Mississippi State
C	Reese Dismukes	Auburn	Travis Swanson	Arkansas
OG	Cyrus Kouandjio	Alabama	Justin Britt	Missouri
OG	Wesley Johnson	Vanderbilt	Anthony Steen	Alabama
OT	Gabe Jackson	Mississippi State	La'el Collins	LSU
OT	Jake Matthews	Texas A&M	Antonio Richardson	Tennessee
AP	Odell Beckham Jr.	LSU	Marcus Murphy	Missouri
DL	Jadeveon Clowney	South Carolina	Trey Flowers	Arkansas
DL	Dee Ford	Auburn	Anthony Johnson	LSU
DL	Kelcy Quarles	South Carolina	Chris Smith	Arkansas
DL	Michael Sam	Missouri	Ed Stinson	Alabama
LB	A. J. Johnson	Tennessee	Lamin Barrow	LSU
LB	C. J. Mosley	Alabama	Jordan Jenkins	Georgia
LB	Ramik Wilson	Georgia	Avery Williamson	Kentucky
DB	Ha Ha Clinton-Dix	Alabama	Chris Davis	Auburn
DB	E. J. Gaines	Missouri	Andre Hal	Vanderbilt
DB	Vernon Hargreaves III	Florida	Kenny Ladler	Vanderbilt
DB	Cody Prewitt	Ole Miss	Nickoe Whitley	Mississippi State
PK	Marshall Morgan	Georgia	Michael Palardy	Tennessee
P	Drew Kaser	Texas A&M	Cody Mandell	Alabama

=== National awards ===
- A. J. McCarron, Alabama – Maxwell Award (outstanding player)
- Gus Malzahn, Auburn – Home Depot Award (coach of the year)
- A. J. McCarron, Alabama – Johnny Unitas Award (outstanding senior quarterback)
- CJ Mosley, Alabama – Dick Butkus Award (outstanding linebacker)
- Odell Beckham Jr., LSU – Paul Hornung Award (most versatile player)

=== All-Americans ===
- QB – A. J. McCarron, Alabama (AFCA, WCFF)
- RB – Tre Mason, Auburn (TSN)
- WR – Mike Evans, Texas A&M (AFCA, FWAA, WCFF, AP, USAT, CBS, ESPN, SI)
- WR – Jordan Matthews, Vanderbilt (USAT, Athlon)
- OL – Cyrus Kouandjio, Alabama (AFCA, FWAA, WCFF, AP, CBS, Athlon)
- OL – Jake Matthews, Texas A&M (AFCA, FWAA, TSN, WCFF, AP, USAT, CBS, ESPN, SI, Athlon)
- OL – Travis Swanson, Arkansas (USAT)
- DL – Jadeveon Clowney, South Carolina (AFCA)
- DL – Kelcy Quarles, South Carolina (TSN)
- DL – Michael Sam, Missouri (AFCA, FWAA, TSN, WCFF, AP, USAT, CBS, ESPN, SI, Athlon)
- LB – C. J. Mosley, Alabama (AFCA, FWAA, TSN, WCFF, AP, USAT, CBS, ESPN, Athlon)
- DB – Ha Ha Clinton-Dix, Alabama (AFCA, FWAA, TSN, ESPN)
- DB – Cody Prewitt, Ole Miss (AP, USAT)

== 2014 NFL draft ==
Team	Round 1	Round 2	Round 3	Round 4	Round 5	Round 6	Round 7	Total
Alabama	2	1	0	1	3	1	0	8
Arkansas	0	0	1	0	1	0	2	4
Auburn	2	0	1	0	0	1	0	4
Florida	1	0	0	1	1	1	0	4
Georgia	0	0	0	0	2	0	0	2
Kentucky	0	0	0	0	1	0	0	1
LSU	1	3	1	0	1	2	1	9
Mississippi State	0	0	1	0	0	0	0	1
Missouri	0	2	0	0	0	1	1	4
Ole Miss	0	0	1	0	0	0	0	1
South Carolina	1	0	0	1	0	0	0	2
Tennessee	1	0	0	0	0	2	0	3
Texas A&M	3	0	0	0	0	0	0	3
Vanderbilt	0	1	0	0	1	0	1	3

*	= compensatory selection

Rnd.	Pick	Team	Player	Pos.	College	Notes
1	1	Houston Texans	Jadeveon Clowney	DE	South Carolina	
1	2	St. Louis Rams	Greg Robinson	T	Auburn	from Washington (Note: No. 2: Washington → St. Louis (PD). Washington traded this selection along with its first-round selection (6th overall) in 2012, its second-round selection in 2012 and its first round selection in 2013 (22nd overall) to St. Louis in exchange for St. Louis' 2012 first-round selection (No. 2 overall).)
1	6	Atlanta Falcons	Jake Matthews	T	Texas A&M	
1	7	Tampa Bay Buccaneers	Mike Evans	WR	Texas A&M	
1	12	New York Giants	Odell Beckham Jr.	WR	LSU	
1	17	Baltimore Ravens	C. J. Mosley	LB	Alabama	
1	19	Miami Dolphins	Ja'Wuan James	T	Tennessee	
1	21	Green Bay Packers	Ha Ha Clinton-Dix	S	Alabama	
1	22	Cleveland Browns	Johnny Manziel	QB	Texas A&M	from Philadelphia (Note: No. 22: Philadelphia → Cleveland (D). Philadelphia traded this selection to Cleveland in exchange for a first round selection (26th) which Cleveland had previously acquired from Indianapolis and a third rounder (83rd).); 2012 Heisman Trophy winner (Note: Manziel was the 2012 winner of the Heisman Trophy, which is awarded annually to the player deemed the most outstanding player in collegiate football.)
1	23	Kansas City Chiefs	Dee Ford	DE	Auburn	
1	29	New England Patriots	Dominique Easley	DT	Florida	
2	42	Philadelphia Eagles	Jordan Matthews	WR	Vanderbilt	from Tennessee (Note: No. 42: Tennessee → Philadelphia (D). Tennessee traded this selection to Philadelphia in exchange for Philadelphia's second and fourth round selections (54th & 122nd).)
2	44	Buffalo Bills	Cyrus Kouandjio	T	Alabama	from St. Louis (Note: No. 44: St. Louis → Buffalo (D). see No. 41: Buffalo → St. Louis.)
2	51	Chicago Bears	Ego Ferguson	DT	LSU	
2	55	Cincinnati Bengals	Jeremy Hill	RB	LSU	
2	60	Carolina Panthers	Kony Ealy	DE	Missouri	
2	63	Miami Dolphins	Jarvis Landry	WR	LSU	from Denver via San Francisco (Note: No. 63: multiple trades: No. 63: Denver → San Francisco (D). see No. 56: San Francisco → Denver. No. 63: San Francisco → Miami (D). see No. 57: Miami → San Francisco.)
2	64	Seattle Seahawks	Justin Britt	T	Missouri	
3	75	St. Louis Rams	Tre Mason	RB	Auburn	
3	76	Detroit Lions	Travis Swanson	C	Arkansas	
3	81	Oakland Raiders	Gabe Jackson	G	Mississippi State	from Miami (Note: No. 81: Miami → Oakland (D). see No. 67: Oakland → Miami.)
3	90	Indianapolis Colts	Donte Moncrief	WR	Ole Miss	
3	92	Carolina Panthers	Trai Turner	G	LSU	
4	101	Philadelphia Eagles	Jaylen Watkins	CB	Florida	from Houston (Note: No. 101: Houston → Philadelphia (D). see No. 83: Philadelphia → Houston.)
4	106	San Francisco 49ers	Bruce Ellington	WR	South Carolina	from Cleveland (Note: No. 106: Cleveland → San Francisco (D). see No. 94: San Francisco → Cleveland.)
4	123	Seattle Seahawks	Kevin Norwood	WR	Alabama	from Cincinnati (Note: No. 123: Cincinnati → Seattle (D). see No. 111: Seattle → Cincinnati.)
5	151	Tennessee Titans	Avery Williamson	LB	Kentucky	
5	155	Miami Dolphins	Arthur Lynch	TE	Georgia	
5	156	Denver Broncos	Lamin Barrow	LB	LSU	from Chicago (Note: No. 156: Chicago → Denver (D). see No. 131: Denver → Chicago.)
5	159	Jacksonville Jaguars	Chris Smith	DE	Arkansas	from Baltimore (Note: No. 159: Baltimore → Jacksonville (PD). see No. 114: Baltimore → Jacksonville.)
5	160	Arizona Cardinals	Ed Stinson	DE	Alabama	
5	163	Kansas City Chiefs	Aaron Murray	QB	Georgia	
5	164	Cincinnati Bengals	A. J. McCarron	QB	Alabama	
5	167	New Orleans Saints	Vinnie Sunseri	S	Alabama	
5	169	New Orleans Saints	Ronald Powell	OLB	Florida	from New England via Philadelphia (Note: No. 169: multiple trades: No. 169: New England → Philadelphia (PD). New England traded this selection to Philadelphia in exchange for defensive tackle Isaac Sopoaga and Philadelphia's sixth round selection (198th). No. 169: Philadelphia → New Orleans (PD). Philadelphia then traded this selection to New Orleans in exchange for running back Darren Sproles. (Note: Terrell, Katherine (March 13, 2014). "New Orleans Saints trade running back Darren Sproles to Philadelphia Eagles". The Times-Picayune.))
5*	173	Pittsburgh Steelers	Wesley Johnson	C	Vanderbilt	
6	177	Houston Texans	Jeoffrey Pagan	DE	Alabama	
6	178	Tennessee Titans	Zach Mettenberger	QB	LSU	from Washington (Note: No. 178: Washington → Tennessee (D). Washington traded this selection to Tennessee in exchange for Tennessee's sixth and seventh round selections (186th & 228th).)
6	179	New England Patriots	Jon Halapio	G	Florida	from Jacksonville (Note: No. 179: Jacksonville → New England (D). see No. 93: New England → Jacksonville.)
6	181	Houston Texans	Alfred Blue	RB	LSU	from Oakland (Note: No. 181: Oakland → Houston (PD). Oakland traded this selection to Houston in exchange for quarterback Matt Schaub.)
6	188	St. Louis Rams	E. J. Gaines	CB	Missouri	
6	193	Kansas City Chiefs	Zach Fulton	G	Tennessee	from Dallas (Note: No. 193: Dallas → Kansas City (PD). Dallas traded this selection to Kansas City in exchange for linebacker Edgar Jones and Kansas City's seventh round selection (238th).)
6*	211	Houston Texans	Jay Prosch	FB	Auburn	
6*	215	Pittsburgh Steelers	Daniel McCullers	DT	Tennessee	
7	216	Houston Texans	Andre Hal	CB	Vanderbilt	
7	227	Seattle Seahawks	Kiero Small	RB	Arkansas	from Detroit (Note: No. 227: Detroit → Seattle (D). see No. 40: Seattle → Detroit.)
7	228	Washington Redskins	Zach Hocker	K	Arkansas	from Tennessee (Note: No. 228: Tennessee → Washington (D). see No. 178: Washington → Tennessee.)
7	239	Cincinnati Bengals	James Wright	WR	LSU	
7*	249	St. Louis Rams	Michael Sam	DE	Missouri	First openly gay player to be selected in the NFL draft

N.B: In the explanations below, (D) denotes trades that took place during the 2014 Draft, while (PD) indicates trades completed pre-draft.

== Home attendance ==
Team	Stadium	Capacity	Game 1	Game 2	Game 3	Game 4	Game 5	Game 6	Game 7	Game 8	Total	Average	% of Capacity
Alabama	Bryant–Denny Stadium	101,821	101,821	101,821	101,254	101,821	101,821	101,821	100,179	—	710,538	101,505	99.69%
Arkansas	Razorback Stadium	72,000	69,801	47,358^{A}	63,067	72,613	66,302	66,835	45,198^{A}	—	431,174	67,784	92.08%
Auburn	Jordan–Hare Stadium	87,451	85,095	83,246	85,817	86,504	84,171	85,517	87,451	87,451	685,252	85,656	97.95%
Florida	Ben Hill Griffin Stadium	88,548	83,604	90,074	90,043	88,004	82,459	90,458	—	—	524,642	87,440	98.75%
Georgia	Sanford Stadium	92,746	92,746	92,746	92,746	92,746	92,746	92,746	—	—	556,476	92,476	100%
Kentucky	Commonwealth Stadium	67,942	54,846	65,445	62,076	69,873	53,797	55,280	54,986	—	416,303	59,472	87.53%
LSU	Tiger Stadium	92,542	90,037	89,113	92,368	92,980	92,554	92,949	89,656	—	639,657	91,380	98.74%
Mississippi State	Davis Wade	55,082	55,085	55,096	57,113	55,148	55,102	57,211	55,113	—	389,868	55,695	101.11%
Missouri	Faurot Field	67,124	58,038	56,785	62,468	67,124	67,124	65,869	67,124	—	444,532	63,505	94.61%
Ole Miss	Vaught–Hemingway	60,580	60,815	60,950	61,160	57,870	60,856	52,931	61,168	—	415,750	59,393	98.04%
South Carolina	Williams-Brice Stadium	80,250	81,572	81,371	82,313	82,111	83,853	81,411	84,174	—	576,805	82,401	102.68%
Tennessee	Neyland Stadium	102,455	97,169	86,783	87,266	102,455	95,736	102,455	97,223	—	669,087	95,584	93.29%
Texas A&M	Kyle Field	82,589	86,686	86,800	87,596	86,542	87,165	86,584	87,126	88,504	697,003	87,125	105.49%
Vanderbilt	Vanderbilt Stadium	40,350	40,350	33,162	32,467	36,892	40,350	33,488	33,019	—	249,728	35,675	88.41%

^AGames played at Arkansas' secondary home stadium War Memorial Stadium, capacity: 54,120.

Attendance was 84,693 for the WLOCP, an SEC home game played at a neutral site
