= 2013 NCAA Division I FBS football season =

American college football season

2013 NCAA Division I FBS season
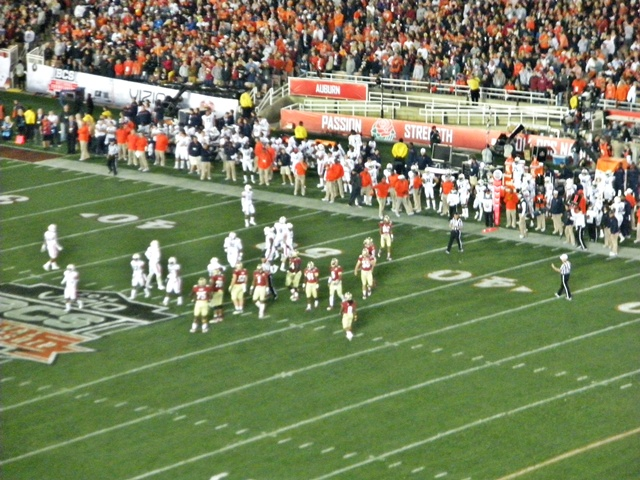
- Number of teams: 124 full members + 2 transitional
- Duration: August 29 – December 14
- Preseason AP No. 1: Alabama

Postseason
- Duration: December 21, 2013 – January 6, 2014
- Bowl games: 35
- Heisman Trophy: Jameis Winston (quarterback, Florida State)

Bowl Championship Series
- 2014 BCS Championship Game
- Site: Rose Bowl Stadium; Pasadena, California
- Champion(s): Florida State

NCAA Division I FBS football seasons
- ← 2012 2014 →

The 2013 NCAA Division I FBS football season was the highest level of college football competition in the United States organized by the National Collegiate Athletic Association (NCAA).

The regular season began on August 29, 2013, and ended on December 14, 2013. The postseason concluded on January 6, 2014, with the final BCS National Championship Game, played at the Rose Bowl in Pasadena, California.

The Florida State Seminoles beat the Auburn Tigers in the BCS National Championship Game to become the consensus national champion of the 2013 season. This was the final season in which the Bowl Championship Series (BCS) was used to determine the national champion of the Football Bowl Subdivision; the BCS was replaced by the College Football Playoff system starting with the 2014 season.

== Rule changes ==
The following rule changes were made by the NCAA Football Rules Committee for the 2013 season:

- Players who intentionally deliver a blow above the shoulders of a defenseless player (targeting) will now be automatically ejected from the game in addition to the 15-yard penalty assessed. If the ejection occurs in the first half, it is for the remainder of the game. If the ejection occurs in the second half or in overtime, it is for the remainder of the game plus the first half of the next scheduled game. The ejection penalty is automatically reviewed to determine if the hit was intentional; however, the yardage penalty is not reviewable (this rule was later changed for the 2014 season to overturn the yardage penalty if the ejection was overturned).
- Blocking below the waist is now legal if done from the front side of the defender anywhere on the field, while blocks below the waist delivered from the side or back are fouls, simplifying rule changes from the 2011 and 2012 seasons.
- In the final minute of each half, if the clock is stopped solely for an injured player, there will be an option for a 10-second runoff before the ball is put in play to cut down on teams faking injuries to stop the clock. If the clock is stopped for another reason (first down, incomplete pass, etc.) or if players from both teams are injured on the same play no runoff will occur.
- If the clock is stopped and will restart on the referee's signal with three or more seconds remaining in a half, the ball can be spiked to get an additional play. If one or two seconds remain on the game clock when the ball is spiked, the half or game will end.
- Permitting the use of electronic equipment such as wireless headsets for game officials to communicate with each other.
- Two players at the same position on the same team may not wear the same uniform number (example, two quarterbacks on the same team cannot wear No. 12).
- Players that change numbers during a game must report to the referee, who will announce it via wireless microphone. Failure to report is a 15-yard unsportsmanlike conduct penalty.
- Instant replay will be permitted to adjust the game clock at the end of each quarter. Previously, instant replay could only adjust the game clock at the end of each half.
- Permitting the Big 12 Conference to experiment with an eighth official during conference games, positioned in the offensive backfield opposite the Referee (similar to the positioning of the umpire in the NFL) to assist in detecting infractions (such as holding, chop blocks, blindside hits on the quarterback, etc.) on the offensive line as well as spotting the ball and monitoring substitutions. This official will be referred to as an "alternate referee" and wear an "A" on the back of the uniform. Use of eight-man officiating crews was expanded to all FBS conferences in the 2014 season.

A rule that would have required the colors of uniform jerseys and pants to contrast to the field was recommended by the Rules Committee but was denied by the Playing Rules Oversight Panel. This rule was proposed to prevent teams (such as Boise State) from wearing uniforms that matched the color of their field. Another recommended rule would have switched the side of the field on which the line-to-gain and down markers are displayed in each half but was also denied.

The NCAA Legislative Council also approved a new rule that allows any FBS team with a 6–6 record entering a conference championship game to be bowl-eligible regardless of the result of the title game. Previously, such teams (for example, Georgia Tech last season and UCLA in 2011) had to seek an NCAA waiver if they lost in their conference championship.

== Conference realignment ==
On April 3, 2013, the schools remaining in the original Big East Conference, which had sold the "Big East" name to the seven Catholic schools that would later leave the league to form the new Big East in July 2013, announced that they would operate as the American Athletic Conference (shortened to AAC or "The American"). The AAC filled its membership by adding schools from Conference USA, which replaced its losses with former Sun Belt and Western Athletic Conference (WAC) members.

The WAC discontinued football as a sponsored sport after the 2012 season when most of its football-playing members announced their departures for other conferences, primarily the Mountain West, in the preceding years. The WAC became the first FBS (formerly Division I-A) conference to drop football since the Big West Conference did so after the 2000 season. Idaho and New Mexico State, the two WAC football members who remained for 2013 season, temporarily became FBS independents in football. The WAC would not reinstate football until 2021, doing so as an FCS conference.

=== Membership changes ===
School	Former conference	New conference
Florida Atlantic	Sun Belt	Conference USA
FIU	Sun Belt	Conference USA
Georgia State	CAA (FCS)	Sun Belt
Houston	Conference USA	The American
Idaho	WAC	FBS independent
Louisiana Tech	WAC	Conference USA
Memphis	Conference USA	The American
Middle Tennessee	Sun Belt	Conference USA
New Mexico State	WAC	FBS independent
North Texas	Sun Belt	Conference USA
Pittsburgh	Big East	ACC
San Jose State	WAC	Mountain West
SMU	Conference USA	The American
Syracuse	Big East	ACC
Texas State	WAC	Sun Belt
UCF	Conference USA	The American
Utah State	WAC	Mountain West
UTSA	WAC	Conference USA

== Other headlines ==
- May 14 – The University of Hawaiʻi at Mānoa announced that effective July 1, all of the school's men's sports teams would use the nickname Rainbow Warriors, a combination of the school's historic name of "Rainbows" and the "Warriors" nickname used by some teams since 2000. This reversed a plan announced by UH in February 2013, under which all men's teams would use "Warriors", previously used by football, men's golf, and men's volleyball. UH had allowed men's teams to choose their own nicknames in 2000, which resulted in the baseball team using "Rainbows", the three aforementioned teams using "Warriors", and other men's teams using "Rainbow Warriors". The change did not affect UH women's sports, which continue to be known as Rainbow Wahine.
- May 20 – The organizers of the Military Bowl announced that the game, previously held at RFK Stadium in Washington, D.C., would be moved to Navy–Marine Corps Memorial Stadium in Annapolis, Maryland effective with the upcoming 2013 edition.
- September 7 – The 2013 Michigan–Notre Dame game set an NCAA record for attendance in a game with 115,109 fans attending the game at Michigan Stadium (also known as the Big House). Michigan won the game 41–30.
- October 10 – Minnesota and its head coach Jerry Kill jointly announced that Kill would take an indefinite leave of absence, effective immediately, to focus on treatment and management of his epilepsy. Kill had missed the second half of the Golden Gophers' win over Western Illinois on September 14 due to a seizure, and was unable to travel with the team to Michigan on October 5 due to his condition. Minnesota named defensive coordinator Tracy Claeys as interim head coach; Kill returned to the team for the Northwestern game on October 19, but remained in the press box, allowing Claeys to direct the team from the sidelines until resuming on-field duties in the second half of the Texas Bowl.
- November 30 – In a game whose winner would clinch the SEC West division and a berth in the 2013 SEC Championship Game, the No. 4-ranked Auburn Tigers upset the No. 1 Alabama Crimson Tide in the 2013 Iron Bowl by a score of 34–28. Auburn's Chris Davis returned a missed Alabama field goal attempt for a touchdown on the final play of the game, which was dubbed the "Kick Six." The Iron Bowl was one of the most-watched games of the 2013 season, and the play was widely considered to be one of the greatest moments in the history of college football.

== Updated stadiums ==
- Nebraska's Memorial Stadium was expanded.
- Kansas State's Bill Snyder Family Stadium was renovated.
- Arizona's Arizona Stadium was renovated.
- Washington returned to Husky Stadium following a $280 million renovation that began during the 2011 season.
- UCLA's Rose Bowl was renovated.
- Houston's Robertson Stadium was closed after the 2012 season; a new venue that ultimately became TDECU Stadium opened on the former stadium's site in 2014. The Cougars used Reliant Stadium (home to the Houston Texans) for five of their seven home games in 2013 and two games at BBVA Compass Stadium (home to the Houston Dynamo of MLS).
- Massachusetts' Warren McGuirk Alumni Stadium was renovated, maintaining its previous capacity of 17,000, and was planned to be ready by the 2014 season. The Minutemen were to use Gillette Stadium (home to the New England Patriots and New England Revolution) for their entire 2013 home schedule, however the school was also contracted to play at least four home games at Gillette Stadium in each season from 2014 to 2016.
- Missouri's Faurot Field underwent renovation, and its seating was temporarily cut from 71,004 to 67,124 for 2013, in preparation for an expansion to 77,000 in 2014.
- Texas Tech's Jones AT&T Stadium was renovated with an upgraded video board and colonnade.

== Regular season top 10 matchups ==
Rankings reflect the AP Poll. Rankings for Week 9 and beyond will list BCS Rankings first and AP Poll second. Teams that failed to be a top 10 team for one poll or the other will be noted.

- Week 1
  - No. 8 Clemson defeated No. 5 Georgia, 38–35 (Memorial Stadium, Clemson, South Carolina)
- Week 3
  - No. 1 Alabama defeated No. 6 Texas A&M, 49–42 (Kyle Field, College Station, Texas)
- Week 5
  - No. 9 Georgia defeated No. 6 LSU, 44–41 (Sanford Stadium, Athens, Georgia)
- Week 8
  - No. 5 Florida State defeated No. 3 Clemson, 51–14 (Memorial Stadium, Clemson, South Carolina)
- Week 10
  - No. 3 Florida State defeated No. 7 Miami, 41–14 (Doak Campbell Stadium, Tallahassee, Florida)
- Week 11
  - No. 1/1 Alabama defeated No. 13/10 LSU, 38–17 (Bryant–Denny Stadium, Tuscaloosa, Alabama)
  - No. 5/6 Stanford defeated No. 3/2 Oregon, 26–20 (Stanford Stadium, Stanford, California)
  - No. 6/5 Baylor defeated No. 10/12 Oklahoma, 41–12 (Floyd Casey Stadium, Waco, Texas)
- Week 13
  - No. 10/11 Oklahoma State defeated No. 4/3 Baylor, 49–17 (Boone Pickens Stadium, Stillwater, Oklahoma)
- Week 14
  - No. 4/4 Auburn defeated No. 1/1 Alabama, 34–28 (Jordan–Hare Stadium, Auburn, Alabama)
  - No. 10/10 South Carolina defeated No. 6/6 Clemson, 31–17 (Williams–Brice Stadium, Columbia, South Carolina)
- Week 15
  - No. 3/3 Auburn defeated No. 5/5 Missouri, 59–42 (2013 SEC Championship Game, Georgia Dome, Atlanta, Georgia)
  - No. 10/10 Michigan State defeated No. 2/2 Ohio State, 34–24 (2013 Big Ten Championship Game, Lucas Oil Stadium, Indianapolis, Indiana)

== Conference standings ==
2013 American Athletic Conference football standings
	Conf.			Overall
Team	W		L	W		L
No. 10 UCF $	8	–	0	12	–	1
No. 15 Louisville	7	–	1	12	–	1
Cincinnati	6	–	2	9	–	4
Houston	5	–	3	8	–	5
SMU	4	–	4	5	–	7
Rutgers	3	–	5	6	–	7
UConn	3	–	5	3	–	9
South Florida	2	–	6	2	–	10
Memphis	1	–	7	3	–	9
Temple	1	–	7	2	–	10
$ – BCS representative as conference champion; Rankings from AP Poll

2013 Atlantic Coast Conference football standings
	Conf.			Overall
Team	W		L	W		L
Atlantic Division
No. 1 Florida State x$#	8	–	0	14	–	0
No. 8 Clemson %	7	–	1	11	–	2
Boston College	4	–	4	7	–	6
Syracuse	4	–	4	7	–	6
Maryland	3	–	5	7	–	6
Wake Forest	2	–	6	4	–	8
NC State	0	–	8	3	–	9
Coastal Division
No. 23 Duke x	6	–	2	10	–	4
Miami (FL)	5	–	3	9	–	4
Virginia Tech	5	–	3	8	–	5
Georgia Tech	5	–	3	7	–	6
North Carolina	4	–	4	7	–	6
Pittsburgh	3	–	5	7	–	6
Virginia	0	–	8	2	–	10
Championship: Florida State 45, Duke 7
# – BCS National Champion; $ – BCS representative as conference champion; % – BCS at-large representative; x – Division champion/co-champions; Rankings from AP Poll

2013 Big Ten Conference football standings
	Conf.			Overall
Team	W		L	W		L
Legends Division
No. 3 Michigan State x$	8	–	0	13	–	1
Iowa	5	–	3	8	–	5
Nebraska	5	–	3	9	–	4
Minnesota	4	–	4	8	–	5
Michigan	3	–	5	7	–	6
Northwestern	1	–	7	5	–	7
Leaders Division
No. 12 Ohio State x%	8	–	0	12	–	2
No. 22 Wisconsin	6	–	2	9	–	4
Penn State*	4	–	4	7	–	5
Indiana	3	–	5	5	–	7
Illinois	1	–	7	4	–	8
Purdue	0	–	8	1	–	11
Championship: Michigan State 34, Ohio State 24
$ – BCS representative as conference champion; % – BCS at-large representative; x – Division champion/co-champions; Penn State ineligible for conference championship game and post-season bowl games due to NCAA sanctions; Rankings from AP Poll

2013 Big 12 Conference football standings
	Conf.			Overall
Team	W		L	W		L
No. 13 Baylor $	8	–	1	11	–	2
No. 6 Oklahoma %	7	–	2	11	–	2
No. 17 Oklahoma State	7	–	2	10	–	3
Texas	7	–	2	8	–	5
Kansas State	5	–	4	8	–	5
Texas Tech	4	–	5	8	–	5
TCU	2	–	7	4	–	8
West Virginia	2	–	7	4	–	8
Iowa State	2	–	7	3	–	9
Kansas	1	–	8	3	–	9
$ – BCS representative as conference champion; % – BCS at-large representative; Rankings from AP Poll

2013 Conference USA football standings
	Conf.			Overall
Team	W		L	W		L
East Division
Marshall x	7	–	1	10	–	4
East Carolina	6	–	2	10	–	3
Middle Tennessee	6	–	2	8	–	5
Florida Atlantic	4	–	4	6	–	6
UAB	1	–	7	2	–	10
Southern Miss	1	–	7	1	–	11
FIU	1	–	7	1	–	11
West Division
Rice x$	7	–	1	10	–	4
UTSA	6	–	2	7	–	5
North Texas	6	–	2	9	–	4
Tulane	5	–	3	7	–	6
Louisiana Tech	3	–	5	4	–	8
Tulsa	2	–	6	3	–	9
UTEP	1	–	7	2	–	10
Championship: Rice 41, Marshall 24
$ – Conference champion; x – Division champion/co-champions; Rankings from AP Poll

2013 Mid-American Conference football standings
	Conf.			Overall
Team	W		L	W		L
East Division
Bowling Green x$	7	–	1	10	–	4
Buffalo	6	–	2	8	–	5
Ohio	4	–	4	7	–	6
Akron	4	–	4	5	–	7
Kent State	3	–	5	4	–	8
UMass	1	–	7	1	–	11
Miami (OH)	0	–	8	0	–	12
West Division
Northern Illinois x	8	–	0	12	–	2
Ball State	7	–	1	10	–	3
Toledo	5	–	3	7	–	5
Central Michigan	5	–	3	6	–	6
Eastern Michigan	1	–	7	2	–	10
Western Michigan	1	–	7	1	–	11
Championship: Bowling Green 47, Northern Illinois 27
$ – Conference champion; x – Division champion/co-champions

2013 Mountain West Conference football standings
	Conf.			Overall
Team	W		L	W		L
Mountain Division
Utah State x	7	–	1	9	–	5
Boise State	6	–	2	8	–	5
Colorado State	5	–	3	8	–	6
Wyoming	3	–	5	5	–	7
New Mexico	1	–	7	3	–	9
Air Force	0	–	8	2	–	10
West Division
Fresno State x$	7	–	1	11	–	2
San Diego State	6	–	2	8	–	5
UNLV	5	–	3	7	–	6
San Jose State	5	–	3	6	–	6
Nevada	3	–	5	4	–	8
Hawaii	0	–	8	1	–	11
Championship: Fresno State 24, Utah State 17
$ – Conference champion; x – Division champion/co-champions; Rankings from AP Poll

2013 Pac-12 Conference football standings
	Conf.			Overall
Team	W		L	W		L
North Division
No. 11 Stanford xy$	7	–	2	11	–	3
No. 9 Oregon x	7	–	2	11	–	2
No. 25 Washington	5	–	4	9	–	4
Oregon State	4	–	5	7	–	6
Washington State	4	–	5	6	–	7
California	0	–	9	1	–	11
South Division
No. 21 Arizona State xy	8	–	1	10	–	4
No. 16 UCLA	6	–	3	10	–	3
No. 19 USC	6	–	3	10	–	4
Arizona	4	–	5	8	–	5
Utah	2	–	7	5	–	7
Colorado	1	–	8	4	–	8
Championship: Stanford 38, Arizona State 14
$ – BCS representative as conference champion; x – Division champion/co-champions; y – Championship game participant; Rankings from AP Poll

2013 Southeastern Conference football standings
	Conf.			Overall
Team	W		L	W		L
Eastern Division
No. 5 Missouri x	7	–	1	12	–	2
No. 4 South Carolina	6	–	2	11	–	2
Georgia	5	–	3	8	–	5
No. 24 Vanderbilt	4	–	4	9	–	4
Florida	3	–	5	4	–	8
Tennessee	2	–	6	5	–	7
Kentucky	0	–	8	2	–	10
Western Division
No. 2 Auburn xy$	7	–	1	12	–	2
No. 7 Alabama x%	7	–	1	11	–	2
No. 14 LSU *	5	–	3	10	–	3
No. 18 Texas A&M	4	–	4	9	–	4
Mississippi State	3	–	5	7	–	6
Ole Miss *	3	–	5	8	–	5
Arkansas	0	–	8	3	–	9
Championship: Auburn 59, Missouri 42
$ – BCS representative as conference champion; % – BCS at-large representative; x – Division champion/co-champions; y – Championship game participant; * LSU and Ole Miss vacated all wins (except for Ole Miss' Music City Bowl win) due to NCAA violations.; Rankings from AP Poll

2013 Sun Belt Conference football standings
	Conf.			Overall
Team	W		L	W		L
Arkansas State $	5	–	2	8	–	5
Western Kentucky	4	–	3	8	–	4
South Alabama	4	–	3	6	–	6
Troy	4	–	3	6	–	6
Louisiana–Monroe	4	–	3	6	–	6
Texas State	2	–	5	6	–	6
Louisiana–Lafayette *	0	–	2	1	–	4
Georgia State **	0	–	7	0	–	12
$ – Conference champion; * – Louisiana–Lafayette vacated eight wins due to NCAA violations ** – Georgia State ineligible for postseason play due to FCS-to-FBS transition rules

2013 NCAA Division I FBS independents football records
	Conf.			Overall
Team	W		L	W		L
No. 20 Notre Dame*		–		9	–	4
Navy		–		9	–	4
BYU		–		8	–	5
Army		–		3	–	9
New Mexico State		–		2	–	10
Idaho		–		1	–	11
*All wins for Notre Dame (9–4) in the 2013 season were later vacated; Rankings from AP Poll

== Conference champions ==
Rankings reflect the Week 15 AP Poll before the conference championship games were played.

Conference	Champion	Runner-up	Championship Game Score	Offensive Player of the Year	Defensive Player of the Year	Coach of the Year
American	No. 15 UCF	N/A	N/A	Blake Bortles, UCF	Marcus Smith, Louisville	George O'Leary, UCF
ACC	No. 1 Florida State	No. 20 Duke	45–7	Jameis Winston, Florida State	Aaron Donald, Pittsburgh	David Cutcliffe, Duke
Big 12	No. 9 Baylor	N/A	N/A	Bryce Petty, Baylor	Jackson Jeffcoat, Texas & Jason Verrett, TCU	Art Briles, Baylor
Big Ten	No. 10 Michigan State	No. 2 Ohio State	34–24	Braxton Miller, Ohio State	Chris Borland, Wisconsin	Mark Dantonio, Michigan State
C-USA	Rice	Marshall	41–24	Rakeem Cato, Marshall	Shawn Jackson, Tulsa	David Bailiff, Rice
MAC	Bowling Green	No. 16 Northern Illinois	47–27	Jordan Lynch, Northern Illinois	Khalil Mack, Buffalo	Rod Carey, Northern Illinois
MW	No. 24 Fresno State	Utah State	24–17	Derek Carr, Fresno State	Shaquil Barrett, Colorado State	Matt Wells, Utah State
Pac-12	No. 7 Stanford	No. 11 Arizona State	38–14	Ka'Deem Carey, Arizona	Will Sutton, Arizona State	Todd Graham, Arizona State
SEC	No. 3 Auburn	No. 5 Missouri	59–42	Tre Mason, Auburn	Michael Sam, Missouri & C.J. Mosley, Alabama	Gus Malzahn, Auburn
Sun Belt	Arkansas State* Louisiana–Lafayette* (vacated)	N/A	N/A	Antonio Andrews, Western Kentucky	Xavius Boyd, Western Kentucky	Joey Jones, South Alabama

- Louisiana–Lafayette vacated its shared Sun Belt Conference title due to NCAA penalties levied in 2016.

== FCS team wins over FBS teams ==
Italics denotes FCS teams.

Date	Visiting team	Home team	Site	Result	Attendance	Ref.
August 29	Southern Utah	South Alabama	Ladd–Peebles Stadium • Mobile, Alabama	22–21	15,240	
August 29	No. 11 (FCS) Towson	UConn	Rentschler Field • East Hartford, Connecticut	33–18	30,689	
August 30	No. 1 (FCS) North Dakota State	Kansas State	Bill Snyder Family Football Stadium • Manhattan, Kansas	24–21	53,351	
August 30	Samford	Georgia State	Georgia Dome • Atlanta, Georgia	31–21	17,606	
August 31	No. 21 (FCS) Eastern Illinois	San Diego State	Qualcomm Stadium • San Diego, California	40–19	42,978	
August 31	No. 4 (FCS) Eastern Washington	No. 25 (FBS) Oregon State	Reser Stadium • Corvallis, Oregon	49–46	41,649	
August 31	McNeese State	South Florida	Raymond James Stadium • Tampa, Florida	53–21	35,470	
August 31	No. 17 (FCS) Northern Iowa	Iowa State	Jack Trice Stadium • Ames, Iowa	28–20	56,800	
September 7	Chattanooga	Georgia State	Georgia Dome • Atlanta, Georgia	42–14	14,952	
September 7	Maine	UMass	Gillette Stadium • Foxborough, Massachusetts	24–14	15,624	
September 7	Nicholls State	Western Michigan	Waldo Stadium • Kalamazoo, Michigan	27–23	24,163	
September 14	No. 23 (FCS) Bethune–Cookman	FIU	FIU Stadium • Miami, Florida	34–13	14,957	
September 14	Fordham	Temple	Lincoln Financial Field • Philadelphia, Pennsylvania	30–29	20,047	
September 21	Jacksonville State	Georgia State	Georgia Dome • Atlanta, Georgia	32–26 ^{OT}	15,425	
November 9	Old Dominion	Idaho	Kibbie Dome • Moscow, Idaho	59–38	14,489	
November 23	Georgia Southern	Florida	Ben Hill Griffin Stadium • Gainesville, Florida	26–20	82,459	
^{#}Rankings from AP Poll released prior to game.

== Final BCS rankings ==
BCS	School	Record	Bowl Game
1	Florida State	13–0	BCS Championship
2	Auburn	12–1	BCS Championship
3	Alabama	11–1	Sugar Bowl
4	Michigan State	12–1	Rose Bowl Game
5	Stanford	11–2	Rose Bowl Game
6	Baylor	11–1	Fiesta Bowl
7	Ohio State	12–1	Orange Bowl
8	Missouri	11–2	Cotton Bowl
9	South Carolina	10–2	Capital One Bowl
10	Oregon	10–2	Alamo Bowl
11	Oklahoma	10–2	Sugar Bowl
12	Clemson	10–2	Orange Bowl
13	Oklahoma State	10–2	Cotton Bowl
14	Arizona State	10–3	Holiday Bowl
15	UCF	11–1	Fiesta Bowl
16	LSU	9–3	Outback Bowl
17	UCLA	9–3	Sun Bowl
18	Louisville	11–1	Russell Athletic Bowl
19	Wisconsin	9–3	Capital One Bowl
20	Fresno State	11–1	Las Vegas Bowl
21	Texas A&M	8–4	Chick-fil-A Bowl
22	Georgia	8–4	Gator Bowl
23	Northern Illinois	12–1	Poinsettia Bowl
24	Duke	10–3	Chick-fil-A Bowl
25	USC	9–4	Las Vegas Bowl

== Bowl games ==
=== Bowl record by conference ===
Conference	Total games	Wins	Losses	Pct.
Sun Belt	2	2	0	1.000
SEC	10	7	3	.700
Pac-12	9	6	3	.667
Independents	3	2	1	.667
C-USA	6	3	3	.500
MW	6	3	3	.500
American	5	2	3	.400
Big 12	6	3	3	.500
ACC	11	5	6	.455
Big Ten	7	2	5	.286
MAC	5	0	5	.000

== Awards and honors ==
=== Heisman Trophy voting ===
The Heisman Trophy is given to the year's most outstanding player

Player	School	Position	1st	2nd	3rd	Total
Jameis Winston	Florida State	QB	668	84	33	2,205
A. J. McCarron	Alabama	QB	79	162	143	704
Jordan Lynch	Northern Illinois	QB	40	149	140	558
Andre Williams	Boston College	RB	29	127	129	470
Johnny Manziel	Texas A&M	QB	30	103	125	421
Tre Mason	Auburn	RB	31	121	69	404
Bryce Petty	Baylor	QB	4	40	35	127
Derek Carr	Fresno State	QB	6	23	43	107
Braxton Miller	Ohio State	QB	4	21	37	91
Ka'Deem Carey	Arizona	RB	2	14	36	70

=== Other major awards ===
- Archie Griffin Award (MVP): Jameis Winston, Florida State
- AP Player of the Year: Jameis Winston, Florida State
- Chic Harley Award (Player of the Year): Jordan Lynch, Northern Illinois
- Maxwell Award (top player): A. J. McCarron, Alabama
- SN Player of the Year: Jameis Winston, Florida State
- Walter Camp Award (top player): Jameis Winston, Florida State

=== Special awards ===
- Burlsworth Trophy (top player who began as walk-on): Jared Abbrederis, Wisconsin
- Paul Hornung Award (most versatile player): Odell Beckham Jr., LSU
- Campbell Trophy ("academic Heisman"): John Urschel, Penn State
- Wuerffel Trophy (humanitarian-athlete): Gabe Ikard, Oklahoma

=== Offense ===
Quarterback

- Davey O'Brien Award (quarterback): Jameis Winston, Florida State
- Johnny Unitas Award (senior/4th year quarterback): A. J. McCarron, Alabama
- Kellen Moore Award (quarterback): A. J. McCarron, Alabama
- Manning Award (quarterback): Jameis Winston, Florida State
- Sammy Baugh Trophy (passing quarterback): Derek Carr, Fresno State

Running back

- Doak Walker Award (running back): Andre Williams, Boston College
- Jim Brown Trophy (running back): Andre Williams, Boston College

Wide receiver

- Fred Biletnikoff Award (wide receiver): Brandin Cooks, Oregon State
- Paul Warfield Trophy (wide receiver): Davante Adams, Fresno State

Tight end

- John Mackey Award (tight end): Austin Seferian-Jenkins, Washington
- Ozzie Newsome Award (tight end): Jace Amaro, Texas Tech

Lineman

- Dave Rimington Trophy (center): Bryan Stork, Florida State
- Outland Trophy (interior lineman): Aaron Donald, Pittsburgh
- Jim Parker Trophy (offensive lineman): Cyril Richardson, Baylor

=== Defense ===
- Bronko Nagurski Trophy (defensive player): Aaron Donald, Pittsburgh
- Chuck Bednarik Award (defensive player): Aaron Donald, Pittsburgh
- Lott Trophy (defensive impact): Anthony Barr, UCLA

Defensive line

- Bill Willis Award (defensive lineman): Aaron Donald, Pittsburgh
- Dick Butkus Award (linebacker): C.J. Mosley, Alabama
- Jack Lambert Trophy (linebacker): Khalil Mack, Buffalo
- Lombardi Award (defensive lineman): Aaron Donald, Pittsburgh
- Ted Hendricks Award (defensive end): Jackson Jeffcoat, Texas

Defensive back

- Jim Thorpe Award (defensive back): Darqueze Dennard, Michigan State
- Jack Tatum Trophy (defensive back): Darqueze Dennard, Michigan State

=== Special teams ===
- Lou Groza Award (placekicker): Roberto Aguayo, Florida State
- Vlade Award (placekicker): Roberto Aguayo, Florida State
- Ray Guy Award (punter): Tom Hornsey, Memphis

=== Coaches ===
- AFCA Coach of the Year: David Cutcliffe, Duke
- AP Coach of the Year: Gus Malzahn, Auburn
- Bobby Bowden National Collegiate Coach of the Year Award: Gus Malzahn, Auburn
- Bobby Dodd Coach of the Year Award: David Cutcliffe, Duke
- Eddie Robinson Coach of the Year: Gus Malzahn, Auburn
- Maxwell Coach of the Year: David Cutcliffe, Duke
- Paul "Bear" Bryant Award: Gus Malzahn, Auburn
- SN Coach of the Year: Gus Malzahn, Auburn and David Cutcliffe, Duke
- The Home Depot Coach of the Year Award: Gus Malzahn, Auburn
- Woody Hayes Trophy: Gus Malzahn, Auburn
- Walter Camp Coach of the Year: David Cutcliffe, Duke

==== Assistants ====
- AFCA Assistant Coach of the Year: Chad Morris, offensive coordinator/quarterbacks coach, Clemson
- Broyles Award: Pat Narduzzi, defensive coordinator, Michigan State

== Coaching changes ==
This is restricted to coaching changes that took place on or after May 1, 2013. For coaching changes that occurred earlier in 2013, see 2012 NCAA Division I FBS end-of-season coaching changes.

Team	Outgoing coach	Date	Reason	Replacement
USC	Lane Kiffin	September 29	Fired	Ed Orgeron (interim)
UConn	Paul Pasqualoni	September 30	Fired	T. J. Weist (interim)
Miami (OH)	Don Treadwell	October 6	Fired	Mike Bath (interim)
FAU	Carl Pelini	October 30	Fired	Brian Wright (interim)
Eastern Michigan	Ron English	November 8	Fired	Stan Parrish (interim)
Wyoming	Dave Christensen	December 1	Fired	Craig Bohl
Wake Forest	Jim Grobe	December 2	Resigned	Dave Clawson
USC	Ed Orgeron	December 2	Resigned	Clay Helton (interim)
USC	Clay Helton	December 2	Permanent replacement	Steve Sarkisian
Washington	Steve Sarkisian	December 2	Hired by USC	Marques Tuiasosopo (interim)
Miami (OH)	Mike Bath	December 3	Permanent replacement	Chuck Martin
Washington	Marques Tuiasosopo	December 6	Permanent replacement	Chris Petersen
Boise State	Chris Petersen	December 6	Hired by Washington	Bob Gregory (interim)
Bowling Green	Dave Clawson	December 10	Hired by Wake Forest	Adam Scheier (interim)
Boise State	Bob Gregory	December 11	Permanent replacement	Bryan Harsin
Arkansas State	Bryan Harsin	December 11	Hired by Boise State	John Thompson (interim)
Eastern Michigan	Stan Parrish	December 11	Permanent replacement	Chris Creighton
UConn	T. J. Weist	December 12	Permanent replacement	Bob Diaco
Texas	Mack Brown	December 14	Resigned	Charlie Strong
Army	Rich Ellerson	December 15	Fired	Jeff Monken
FAU	Brian Wright	December 17	Permanent replacement	Charlie Partridge
Bowling Green	Adam Scheier	December 18	Permanent replacement	Dino Babers
Arkansas State	John Thompson	December 19	Permanent replacement	Blake Anderson
Massachusetts	Charley Molnar	December 26	Fired	Mark Whipple
Penn State	Bill O'Brien	January 2, 2014	Hired by the Houston Texans	James Franklin
Louisville	Charlie Strong	January 5, 2014	Hired by Texas	Bobby Petrino
Western Kentucky	Bobby Petrino	January 9, 2014	Hired by Louisville	Jeff Brohm
UAB	Garrick McGee	January 9, 2014	Hired as offensive coordinator at Louisville	Bill Clark
Vanderbilt	James Franklin	January 9, 2014	Hired by Penn State	Derek Mason

== Television viewers and ratings ==
=== Most watched regular season games ===
Excludes Conference Championships (see chart below)

Rank	Date	Matchup				Channel	Viewers	TV Rating	Significance
1	November 30, 3:30 ET	No. 1 Alabama	28	No. 4 Auburn	34	CBS	13.78 Million	8.2	Kick Six/Rivalry
2	September 14, 3:30 ET	No. 1 Alabama	49	No. 6 Texas A&M	42	CBS	13.59 Million	8.5	
3	November 9, 8:00 ET	No. 13 LSU	17	No. 1 Alabama	38	CBS	11.90 Million	6.9	Rivalry
4	November 30, 12:00 ET	No. 3 Ohio State	42	Michigan	41	ABC	9.5 Million	5.8	Rivalry
5	September 7, 8:00 ET	No. 14 Notre Dame	30	No. 17 Michigan	41	ESPN	8.65 Million	5.3	Under the Lights II/Rivalry
6	November 2, 8:00 ET	No. 7 Miami	14	No. 2 Florida State	41	ABC	8.35 Million	5.1	Rivalry
7	August 31, 8:00 ET	No. 5 Georgia	35	No. 8 Clemson	38	ABC	8.14 Million	4.8	Rivalry
8	November 23, 3:30 ET	No. 12 Texas A&M	10	No. 22 LSU	34	CBS	7.51 Million	4.7	Rivalry
9	September 28, 3:30 ET	No. 6 LSU	41	No. 9 Georgia	44	CBS	7.39 Million	4.6	
10	October 5, 8:00 ET	No. 4 Ohio State	40	No. 16 Northwestern	30	ABC	7.36 Million	4.4	

=== Kickoff games ===
Rank	Date	Matchup				Channel	Viewers	TV Rating	Game	Location
1	August 31, 5:30 ET	No. 1 Alabama	35	Virginia Tech	10	ESPN	5.17 Million	3.0	Chick-fil-A Kickoff Game	Georgia Dome, Atlanta
2	August 31, 3:30 ET	Mississippi State	3	No. 13 Oklahoma State	21	Regional ABC	3.67 Million	2.4	Texas Kickoff	Reliant Stadium, Houston, Texas
3	August 31, 9:00 ET	No. 12 LSU	37	No. 20 TCU	27	ESPN	3.17 Million	1.9	Cowboys Classic	AT&T Stadium, Arlington, Texas

=== Conference championship games ===
Rank	Date	Matchup				Channel	Viewers	TV Rating	Conference	Location
1	December 7, 4:00 ET	No. 5 Missouri	42	No. 3 Auburn	59	CBS	14.35 Million	8.6	SEC	Georgia Dome, Atlanta
2	December 7, 8:17 ET	No. 2 Ohio State	24	No. 10 Michigan State	34	Fox	13.90 Million	7.9	Big Ten	Lucas Oil Stadium, Indianapolis
3	December 7, 8:00 ET	No. 20 Duke	7	No. 1 Florida State	45	ABC	5.66 Million	3.4	ACC	Bank of America Stadium, Charlotte, North Carolina
4	December 6, 8:00 ET	Bowling Green	47	No. 14 Northern Illinois	27	ESPN2	1.87 Million	1.2	MAC	Ford Field, Detroit
5	December 7, 10:00 ET	Utah State	17	No. 23 Fresno State	24	CBS	1.70 Million	1.1	MW	Bulldog Stadium, Fresno, California
6	December 7, 7:45 ET	No. 7 Stanford	38	No. 11 Arizona State	14	ESPN	1.45 Million	0.9	Pac-12	Sun Devil Stadium, Tempe, Arizona
7	December 7, 12:00 ET	Marshall	24	Rice	41	ESPN2	449K	0.3	C-USA	Rice Stadium, Houston, Texas

== Attendances ==
School	G	Attendance	Average
Air Force Falcons	7	228,562	32,652
Akron Zips	6	107,101	17,850
Alabama Crimson Tide	7	710,538	101,505
Arizona Wildcats	6	285,713	47,619
Arizona State Sun Devils	8	501,509	62,689
Arkansas Razorbacks	7	431,174	61,596
Arkansas State Red Wolves	6	149,477	24,913
Army Black Knights	5	169,781	33,956
Auburn Tigers	8	685,252	85,657
Ball State Cardinals	6	90,784	15,131
Baylor Bears	7	321,639	45,948
Boise State Broncos	6	206,198	34,366
Boston College Eagles	6	198,035	33,006
Bowling Green Falcons	6	91,548	15,258
Buffalo Bulls	6	136,418	22,736
BYU Cougars	6	367,349	61,225
California Golden Bears	7	345,303	49,329
Central Michigan Chippewas	5	66,119	13,224
Cincinnati Bearcats	6	190,624	31,771
Clemson Tigers	7	574,333	82,048
Colorado Buffaloes	6	230,778	38,463
Colorado State Rams	6	111,598	18,600
Duke Blue Devils	7	182,431	26,062
East Carolina Pirates	6	263,910	43,985
Eastern Michigan Eagles	5	20,255	4,051
FIU Panthers	6	92,717	15,453
Florida Atlantic Owls	5	72,758	14,552
Florida Gators	6	524,638	87,440
Florida State Seminoles	7	527,947	75,421
Fresno State Bulldogs	7	258,417	36,917
Georgia Bulldogs	6	556,476	92,746
Georgia Tech Yellow Jackets	7	343,542	49,077
Hawaii Rainbow Warriors	6	185,931	30,989
Houston Cougars	6	145,537	24,256
Idaho Vandals	5	73,718	14,744
Illinois Fighting Illini	7	306,506	43,787
Indiana Hoosiers	8	354,823	44,353
Iowa Hawkeyes	7	469,872	67,125
Iowa State Cyclones	6	332,165	55,361
Kansas Jayhawks	7	265,187	37,884
Kansas State Wildcats	8	423,095	52,887
Kent State Golden Flashes	5	85,091	17,018
Kentucky Wildcats	7	416,303	59,472
Louisiana–Lafayette Ragin' Cajuns	5	129,878	25,976
Louisiana–Monroe Warhawks	5	85,177	17,035
Louisiana Tech Bulldogs	5	93,332	18,666
Louisville Cardinals	7	370,396	52,914
LSU Tigers	7	639,927	91,418
Marshall Thundering Herd	6	150,138	25,023
Maryland Terrapins	7	288,946	41,278
Massachusetts Minutemen	6	94,981	15,830
Memphis Tigers	7	199,760	28,537
Miami Hurricanes	7	376,857	53,837
Miami RedHawks	5	79,676	15,935
Michigan Wolverines	7	781,144	111,592
Michigan State Spartans	7	506,294	72,328
Middle Tennessee Blue Raiders	6	112,287	18,715
Minnesota Golden Gophers	7	334,581	47,797
Mississippi State Bulldogs	7	389,868	55,695
Missouri Tigers	7	444,532	63,505
Navy Midshipmen	5	177,940	35,588
Nebraska Cornhuskers	8	727,466	90,933
Nevada Wolf Pack	6	149,635	24,939
New Mexico Lobos	6	141,220	23,537
New Mexico State Aggies	7	112,347	16,050
North Carolina Tar Heels	7	360,500	51,500
NC State Wolfpack	8	425,420	53,178
North Texas Mean Green	6	126,182	21,030
Northern Illinois Huskies	5	103,344	20,669
Northwestern Wildcats	7	275,147	39,307
Notre Dame Fighting Irish	6	484,770	80,795
Ohio Bobcats	7	144,701	20,672
Ohio State Buckeyes	7	734,528	104,933
Oklahoma Sooners	6	508,334	84,722
Oklahoma State Cowboys	6	354,754	59,126
Ole Miss Rebels	7	415,750	59,393
Oregon Ducks	7	403,617	57,660
Oregon State Beavers	6	257,784	42,964
Penn State Nittany Lions	7	676,112	96,587
Pittsburgh Panthers	7	348,188	49,741
Purdue Boilermakers	7	342,673	48,953
Rice Owls	6	112,711	18,785
Rutgers Scarlet Knights	7	325,846	46,549
San Diego State Aztecs	6	199,344	33,224
San Jose State Spartans	6	98,174	16,362
SMU Mustangs	6	112,347	18,725
South Alabama Jaguars	6	95,555	15,926
South Carolina Gamecocks	7	576,805	82,401
South Florida Bulls	7	242,911	34,702
USC Trojans	7	511,885	73,126
Southern Miss Golden Eagles	5	113,759	22,752
Stanford Cardinal	7	355,081	50,726
Syracuse Orange	6	229,661	38,277
TCU Horned Frogs	6	261,587	43,598
Temple Owls	6	134,836	22,473
Tennessee Volunteers	7	669,087	95,584
Texas Longhorns	6	593,857	98,976
Texas A&M Aggies	8	697,003	87,125
Texas State Bobcats	6	108,371	18,062
Texas Tech Red Raiders	6	347,597	57,933
Toledo Rockets	6	110,803	18,467
Troy Trojans	5	94,529	18,906
Tulane Green Wave	6	118,482	19,747
Tulsa Golden Hurricane	6	119,356	19,893
UAB Blazers	5	52,739	10,548
UCF Knights	6	252,505	42,084
UCLA Bruins	6	421,711	70,285
UConn Huskies	7	216,523	30,932
UNLV Rebels	7	120,486	17,212
Utah Utes	7	316,361	45,194
Utah State Aggies	6	139,576	23,263
UTEP Miners	5	141,877	28,375
Vanderbilt Commodores	7	249,728	35,675
Virginia Cavaliers	8	370,234	46,279
Virginia Tech Hokies	6	383,993	63,999
Wake Forest Demon Deacons	6	170,484	28,414
Washington Huskies	7	481,384	68,769
Washington State Cougars	6	178,427	29,738
West Virginia Mountaineers	6	317,459	52,910
Western Kentucky Hilltoppers	5	91,672	18,334
Western Michigan Broncos	5	86,733	17,347
Wisconsin Badgers	7	552,378	78,911
Wyoming Cowboys	6	116,854	19,476
