= 2013 Elon Phoenix football team =

American college football season

2013 Elon Phoenix football
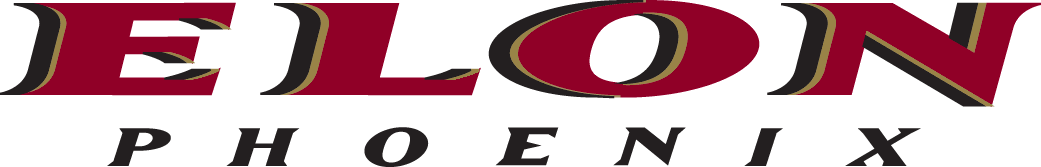
- Conference: Southern Conference
- Record: 2–10 (1–7 SoCon)
- Head coach: Jason Swepson (3rd season)
- Offensive coordinator: Chris Pincince (3rd season)
- Defensive coordinator: Brad Sherrod (1st season)
- Home stadium: Rhodes Stadium

2013 Southern Conference football standings
	Conf.			Overall
Team	W		L	W		L
No. 22 Furman +^	6	–	2	8	–	6
No. 19 Samford +^	6	–	2	8	–	5
No. 23 Chattanooga +	6	–	2	8	–	4
Georgia Southern *	4	–	4	7	–	4
Wofford	4	–	4	5	–	6
The Citadel	4	–	4	5	–	7
Appalachian State *	4	–	4	4	–	8
Elon	1	–	7	2	–	10
Western Carolina	1	–	7	2	–	10
+ – Conference co-champions; ^ – FCS playoff participant; * – Appalachian State and Georgia Southern ineligible for conference championship and FCS playoffs as part of FBS transition; Rankings from The Sports Network Poll

The 2013 Elon Phoenix football team represented Elon University in the 2013 NCAA Division I FCS football season. They were led by third-year head coach Jason Swepson and played their home games at Rhodes Stadium. They were a member of the Southern Conference. This was their final season as a member of the SoCon as they joined the Colonial Athletic Association in 2014. They finished the season 2–10, 1–7 in SoCon play to finish in a tie for eighth place.

On November 25, 2013 Jason Swepson was fired after 3 consecutive losing records with a compiling record a 10–24 in those three seasons.

== Preseason outlook ==
The Elon Phoenix began the season with four players named to the preseason All-Southern Conference teams: Linebacker Jonathan Spain was joined by second-team selections Clay Johnson for offensive line, Kierre Brown as a wide receiver, and defensive back Chandler Wrightenberry. The team began the season picked next to last in the conference.

In May 2013, the school announced that the program will be leaving the Southern Conference to join the Colonial Athletic Association in 2014 as an all-sports member. The 2013 football season was their last season in the Southern Conference.

== Media ==
Every Elon game will be broadcast on WPCM AM 920. Select games will be streamed online by ESPN3.

== Schedule ==
Date	Time	Opponent	Site	TV	Result	Attendance
August 31	12:00 pm	at Georgia Tech*	Bobby Dodd Stadium; Atlanta, GA	ESPN3	L 0–70	45,759
September 7	6:00 pm	West Virginia Wesleyan*	Rhodes Stadium; Elon, NC		W 49–7	7,112
September 14	6:00 pm	at North Carolina A&T*	Aggie Stadium; Greensboro, NC		L 10–23	13,221
September 21	6:00 pm	Appalachian State	Rhodes Stadium; Elon, NC		L 21–31	9,782
September 28	1:30 pm	No. 12 Coastal Carolina*	Rhodes Stadium; Elon, NC	PAA	L 28–53	10,227
October 5	1:30 pm	at Furman	Paladin Stadium; Greenville, SC	ESPN3	W 28–25	10,254
October 12	1:30 pm	No. 12 Wofford	Gibbs Stadium; Spartanburg, SC		L 27–31	8,209
October 19	1:30 pm	Chattanooga	Rhodes Stadium; Elon, NC		L 9–20	6,547
October 26	3:30 pm	at Western Carolina	E. J. Whitmire Stadium; Cullowhee, NC		L 24–27 ^{OT}	9,627
November 9	1:30 pm	The Citadel^{†}	Rhodes Stadium; Elon, NC	PAA	L 10–35	9,256
November 16	3:00 pm	Georgia Southern	Rhodes Stadium; Elon, NC	PAA	L 20–38	6,104
November 23	3:00 pm	at No. 24 Samford	Seibert Stadium; Homewood, AL		L 32–33	8,025
*Non-conference game; ^{†}Homecoming; Rankings from The Sports Network Poll released prior to the game; All times are in Eastern time
