= 2013 The Citadel Bulldogs football team =

American college football season

2013 The Citadel Bulldogs football
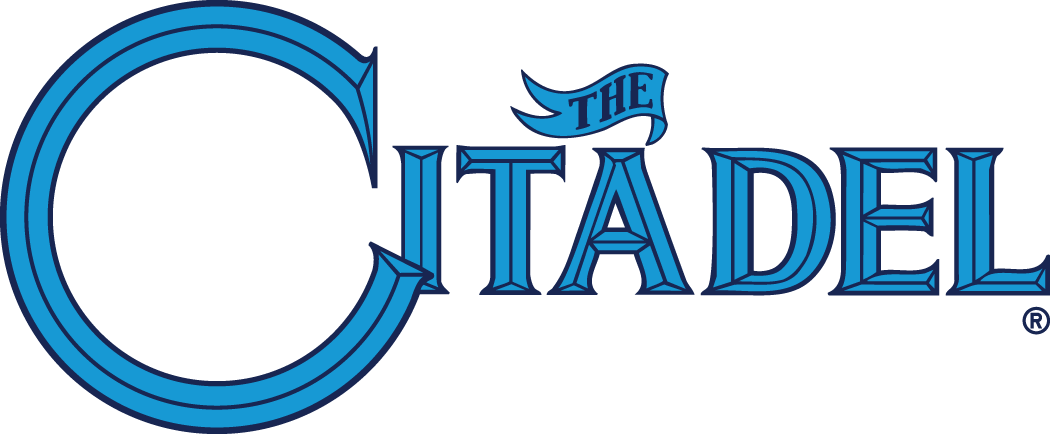
- Conference: Southern Conference
- Record: 5–7 (4–4 SoCon)
- Head coach: Kevin Higgins (9th season)
- Offensive coordinator: Bob Bodine (3rd season)
- Offensive scheme: Triple option
- Defensive coordinator: Denny Doornbos (2nd season)
- Home stadium: Johnson Hagood Stadium

2013 Southern Conference football standings
	Conf.			Overall
Team	W		L	W		L
No. 22 Furman +^	6	–	2	8	–	6
No. 19 Samford +^	6	–	2	8	–	5
No. 23 Chattanooga +	6	–	2	8	–	4
Georgia Southern *	4	–	4	7	–	4
Wofford	4	–	4	5	–	6
The Citadel	4	–	4	5	–	7
Appalachian State *	4	–	4	4	–	8
Elon	1	–	7	2	–	10
Western Carolina	1	–	7	2	–	10
+ – Conference co-champions; ^ – FCS playoff participant; * – Appalachian State and Georgia Southern ineligible for conference championship and FCS playoffs as part of FBS transition; Rankings from The Sports Network poll

The 2013 The Citadel Bulldogs football team represented The Citadel, The Military College of South Carolina in the 2013 NCAA Division I FCS football season. The Bulldogs were led by ninth year head coach Kevin Higgins and played their home games at Johnson Hagood Stadium. They played as members of the Southern Conference, as they have since 1936. They finished the season 5–7, 4–4 in SoCon play to finish in a four-way tie for fourth place.

At the end of the season, head coach Kevin Higgins resigned to become an assistant coach at Wake Forest.

== Schedule ==
For the third year in a row, home games in September were scheduled for a 6:00 p.m. kickoff rather than the traditional 2:00 p.m. kickoff. The Bulldogs faced in-state FBS rival Clemson and Old Dominion, in its first year of transitioning to FBS. FCS teams were permitted to play twelve games in 2013 due to an extra Saturday falling between Labor Day and Thanksgiving.

Date	Time	Opponent	Site	TV	Result	Attendance
August 31	6:00 pm	Charleston Southern*	Johnson Hagood Stadium; Charleston, SC	CSN	L 29–32	12,196
September 7	6:00 pm	No. 16 Wofford	Johnson Hagood Stadium; Charleston, SC (rivalry)	ESPN3	L 10–21	14,545
September 14	3:30 pm	at Western Carolina	E. J. Whitmire Stadium; Cullowhee, NC	CSN	W 28–21	9,345
September 21	6:00 pm	at Old Dominion*	Foreman Field; Norfolk, VA	COX	L 58–59	20,118
September 28	6:00 pm	Furman	Johnson Hagood Stadium; Charleston, SC (rivalry)	CSN	L 17–24	12,693
October 5	2:00 pm	Appalachian State	Johnson Hagood Stadium; Charleston, SC	CSN	W 31–28 ^{OT}	13,601
October 12	1:00 pm	at No. 22 Georgia Southern	Paulson Stadium; Statesboro, GA	CSN	L 21–28	16,128
October 26	2:00 pm	at Chattanooga	Finley Stadium; Chattanooga, TN		L 24–28	8,106
November 2	2:00 pm	No. 15 Samford^{†}	Johnson Hagood Stadium; Charleston, SC	ESPN3	W 28–26	13,828
November 9	1:30 pm	at Elon	Rhodes Stadium; Elon, NC	CSN	W 35–10	9,256
November 16	1:00 pm	VMI*	Johnson Hagood Stadium; Charleston, SC (Military Classic of the South)	CSN	W 31–10	12,069
November 23	12:00 pm	at No. 7 (FBS) Clemson*	Memorial Stadium; Clemson, SC	ESPN3	L 6–52	81,554
*Non-conference game; ^{†}Homecoming; Rankings from The Sports Network Poll released prior to the game; All times are in Eastern time

== Game summaries ==
=== Charleston Southern ===
Team	1	2	3	4	Total
• Buccaneers	0	14	15	3	32
Bulldogs	9	7	6	7	29

- Date: August 31
- Location: Johnson Hagood Stadium, Charleston, SC
- Game start: 6:00 PM EST
- Game attendance: 12,196
- Game weather: Mostly Sunny, 85
- Referee: Ted Pitts

=== Wofford ===
Team	1	2	3	4	Total
• Terriers	0	14	0	7	21
Bulldogs	0	0	10	0	10

- Date: September 6
- Location: Johnson Hagood Stadium, Charleston, SC
- Game start: 6:00 PM EST
- Elapsed time: 2:59
- Game attendance: 14,545
- Game weather: Partly Cloudy, 81
- Referee: Thomas Graham

=== Western Carolina ===
Team	1	2	3	4	Total
• Bulldogs	14	7	7	0	28
Catamounts	0	0	14	7	21

- Date: September 14
- Location: E. J. Whitmire Stadium, Cullowhee, NC
- Game start: 3:30 PM EST
- Elapsed time: 2:30
- Game attendance: 9,345
- Game weather: Mostly sunny, mid-70s
- Referee: Ted Pitts

=== Old Dominion ===
Team	1	2	3	4	Total
Bulldogs	7	24	7	20	58
• Monarchs	14	14	23	8	59

- Date: September 21
- Location: Foreman Field, Norfolk, VA
- Game start: 6:00 PM EST
- Elapsed time: 3:18
- Game attendance: 20,118
- Game weather: Cloudy, 77
- Referee: Ken Antee

=== Furman ===
Team	1	2	3	4	Total
• Paladins	3	14	0	7	24
Bulldogs	0	7	3	7	17

- Date: September 28
- Location: Johnson Hagood Stadium, Charleston, SC
- Game start: 6:00 PM EST
- Elapsed time: 2:44
- Game attendance: 12,693
- Game weather: Cloudy, 75
- Referee: Rodney Burnette

=== Appalachian State ===
Team	1	2	3	4	OT	Total
Mountaineers	7	7	0	14	0	28
• Bulldogs	0	14	7	7	3	31

- Date: October 5
- Location: Johnson Hagood Stadium, Charleston, SC
- Game start: 2:00 PM EST
- Elapsed time: 3:03
- Game attendance: 13,601
- Game weather: Partly Cloudy, 82
- Referee: Lee Hendrick
