= 2013 Wofford Terriers football team =

American college football season

2013 Wofford Terriers football
- Conference: Southern Conference
- Record: 5–6 (4–4 SoCon)
- Head coach: Mike Ayers (26th season)
- Offensive coordinator: Wade Long
- Defensive coordinator: Jack Teachey
- Home stadium: Gibbs Stadium

2013 Southern Conference football standings
	Conf.			Overall
Team	W		L	W		L
No. 22 Furman +^	6	–	2	8	–	6
No. 19 Samford +^	6	–	2	8	–	5
No. 23 Chattanooga +	6	–	2	8	–	4
Georgia Southern *	4	–	4	7	–	4
Wofford	4	–	4	5	–	6
The Citadel	4	–	4	5	–	7
Appalachian State *	4	–	4	4	–	8
Elon	1	–	7	2	–	10
Western Carolina	1	–	7	2	–	10
+ – Conference co-champions; ^ – FCS playoff participant; * – Appalachian State and Georgia Southern ineligible for conference championship and FCS playoffs as part of FBS transition; Rankings from The Sports Network Poll

The 2013 Wofford Terriers football team represented Wofford College in the 2013 NCAA Division I FCS football season. They were led by 26th year head coach Mike Ayers and played their home games at Gibbs Stadium. They were a member of the Southern Conference. They finished the season 5–6, 4–4 in SoCon play to finish in a four way tie for fourth place.

== Schedule ==
Date	Time	Opponent	Rank	Site	TV	Result	Attendance
August 31	7:30 pm	at Baylor*	No. 8	Floyd Casey Stadium; Waco, TX	FCS Central	L 3–69	44,989
September 7	6:00 pm	at The Citadel	No. 16	Johnson Hagood Stadium; Charleston, SC	ESPN3	W 21–10	15,545
September 14	7:00 pm	No. 10 Georgia Southern	No. 16	Gibbs Stadium; Spartanburg, SC	WSC	W 30–20	8,153
September 21	7:00 pm	Gardner–Webb*	No. 10	Gibbs Stadium; Spartanburg, SC	WSC	L 0–3	6,207
October 5	1:30 pm	Presbyterian*	No. 17	Gibbs Stadium; Spartanburg, SC	WSC	W 55–14	7,820
October 12	1:30 pm	Elon	No. 12	Gibbs Stadium; Spartanburg, SC	WSC	W 31–27	8,209
October 19	3:30 pm	at Western Carolina	No. 13	E.J. Whitmire Stadium; Cullowhee, NC	ESPN3	W 21–17	3,367
October 26	1:30 pm	No. 22 Samford	No. 12	Gibbs Stadium; Spartanburg, SC		L 27–34	7,936
November 9	2:00 pm	at No. 24 Chattanooga	No. 17	Finley Stadium; Chattanooga, TN	ESPN3	L 10–20	12,090
November 16	1:30 pm	Appalachian State	No. 24	Gibbs Stadium; Spartanburg, SC	WSC	L 21–33	8,315
November 23	12:00 pm	at Furman		Paladin Stadium; Greenville, SC		L 14–27	8,291
*Non-conference game; Rankings from The Sports Network Poll released prior to the game; All times are in Eastern time

- Source: Schedule

== Ranking movements ==
Ranking movements Legend: ██ Increase in ranking ██ Decrease in ranking — = Not ranked RV = Received votes
	Week														
Poll	Pre	1	2	3	4	5	6	7	8	9	10	11	12	13	Final
Sports Network	8	16	16	10	17	17	12	13	12	17	17	24	RV	RV	RV
Coaches	5	14	10	8	15	15	12	12	11	16	15	21	RV	—	—
