= 2013 Southern Conference football season =

- League: NCAA Division I FCS (Football Championship Subdivision)
- Sport: Football
- Duration: August 2013 - December 2013
- Teams: 9
- TV partner: SoConTV
- Conference champions: Chattanooga, Samford, & Furman

Southern Conference football seasons
- ← 2012 2014 →

2013 Southern Conference football standings
	Conf.			Overall
Team	W		L	W		L
No. 22 Furman +^	6	–	2	8	–	6
No. 19 Samford +^	6	–	2	8	–	5
No. 23 Chattanooga +	6	–	2	8	–	4
Georgia Southern *	4	–	4	7	–	4
Wofford	4	–	4	5	–	6
The Citadel	4	–	4	5	–	7
Appalachian State *	4	–	4	4	–	8
Elon	1	–	7	2	–	10
Western Carolina	1	–	7	2	–	10
+ – Conference co-champions; ^ – FCS playoff participant; * – Appalachian State and Georgia Southern ineligible for conference championship and FCS playoffs as part of FBS transition; Rankings from The Sports Network poll

The 2013 Southern Conference football season, part of the 2013 NCAA Division I FCS football season competition of college football, began on Thursday, August 29, 2013 with Chattanooga hosting Tennessee–Martin. The regular season concluded on November 23, while Samford and Furman qualified for the NCAA Division I Football Championship.

Samford was eliminated in the first round by Jacksonville State. Furman defeated South Carolina State in the opening round, but fell to eventual champion North Dakota State 38–7 in the second round.

Appalachian State and Georgia Southern played their final seasons as members of the Southern Conference but were ineligible to win the conference championship or participate in the playoffs as they transitioned to the Football Bowl Subdivision.

== Head coaches ==
- Scott Satterfield, Appalachian State - 1st year
- Russ Huesman, Chattanooga – 5th year
- Kevin Higgins, The Citadel – 9th year
- Jason Swepson, Elon - 3rd year
- Bruce Fowler, Furman – 3rd year
- Jeff Monken, Georgia Southern - 4th year
- Pat Sullivan, Samford – 6th year
- Mark Speir, Western Carolina – 2nd year
- Mike Ayers, Wofford – 26th year

== Rankings ==
Legend
Increase in ranking
Decrease in ranking
Not ranked previous week

Appalachian State and Georgia Southern were ineligible for the Coaches' Poll due to the additional scholarship players on the rosters as part of their transition to FBS.

		Pre	Wk 1	Wk 2	Wk 3	Wk 4	Wk 5	Wk 6	Wk 7	Wk 8	Wk 9	Wk 10	Wk 11	Wk 12	Wk 13	Final
Appalachian State	TSN	12	21	RV	RV	RV	NR	NR	NR	NR	NR	NR	NR	NR	NR	NR
Appalachian State	C	NR	NR	NR	NR	NR	NR	NR	NR	NR	NR	NR	NR	NR	NR	NR
Chattanooga	TSN	24	RV									24	17	23	21	23
Chattanooga	C	25	RV									23	18	21	23	25
The Citadel	TSN	RV	RV													
The Citadel	C	RV	NR													
Elon	TSN	RV	NR													
Elon	C	NR	NR													
Furman	TSN	RV	NR													
Furman	C	NR	NR													
Georgia Southern	TSN	9	10													
Georgia Southern	C	NR	NR													
Samford	TSN	RV	RV													
Samford	C	RV	RV													
Western Carolina	TSN	NR	NR													
Western Carolina	C	NR	NR													
Wofford	TSN	8	16													
Wofford	C	5	14													

== Regular season ==
Index to colors and formatting
SoCon member won
SoCon member lost
SoCon teams in **bold**

All times Eastern time.

Rankings reflect that of the Sports Network poll for that week.

=== Week One ===
Date	Time	Visiting team	Home team	Site	Broadcast	Result	Attendance	Reference
August 29	7:30 PM	Tennessee–Martin	#24 **Chattanooga**	Finley Stadium • Chattanooga, TN		**L** 21–31	11,163	
August 29	7:30 PM	**Western Carolina**	Middle Tennessee	Johnny "Red" Floyd Stadium • Murfreesboro, TN		**L** 24–45	20,011	
August 30	7:00 PM	**Samford**	Georgia State	Georgia Dome • Atlanta, GA		**W** 31–21	17,606	
August 31	12:00 PM	**Elon**	Georgia Tech	Bobby Dodd Stadium • Atlanta, GA	ESPN3	**L** 0–70	45,759	
August 31	6:00 PM	Charleston Southern	**The Citadel**	Johnson Hagood Stadium • Charleston, SC		**L** 29–32	12,196	
August 31	6:00 PM	Savannah State	#9 **Georgia Southern**	Paulson Stadium • Statesboro, GA		**W** 77–9	16,528	
August 31	6:45 PM	**Furman**	Gardner–Webb	Ernest W. Spangler Stadium • Boiling Springs, NC	WMYA	**L** 21–28	3,876	
August 31	7:30 PM	#8 **Wofford**	Baylor	Floyd Casey Stadium • Waco, TX	FCS Central	**L** 3–69	44,989	
September 1	9:00 PM	#12 **Appalachian State**	#20 Montana	Washington–Grizzly Stadium • Missoula, MT	ESPN3	**L** 6–30	26,293	

Players of the week:

Offensive		Defensive		Freshman		Special teams	
Player	Team	Player	Team	Player	Team	Player	Team

=== Week Two ===
Date	Time	Visiting team	Home team	Site	Broadcast	Result	Attendance	Reference
September 7	1:30 PM	**Western Carolina**	Virginia Tech	Lane Stadium • Blacksburg, VA	ESPN3	**L** 3–45	61,335	
September 7	2:00 PM	**Chattanooga**	Georgia State	Georgia Dome • Atlanta, GA	ESPN3	**W** 42–14	14,952	
September 7	6:00 PM	North Carolina A&T	**Appalachian State**	Kidd Brewer Stadium • Boone, NC		**L** 21–24	25,723	
September 7	6:00 PM	#16 **Wofford**	**The Citadel**	Johnson Hagood Stadium • Charleston, SC	ESPN3	**WOF** 21–10	14,545	
September 7	6:00 PM	West Virginia Wesleyan	**Elon**	Rhodes Stadium • Elon, NC		**W** 49–7	7,112	
September 7	6:00 PM	**Furman**	#24 Coastal Carolina	Brooks Stadium • Conway, SC	WMYA	**L** 28–35	8,636	
September 7	6:00 PM	Saint Francis (PA)	**Georgia Southern**	Paulson Stadium • Statesboro, GA		**W** 59–17	13,758	
September 7	7:00 PM	**Samford**	Arkansas	War Memorial Stadium • Little Rock, AR	PPV	**L** 21–31	47,358	

Players of the week:

Offensive		Defensive		Freshman		Special teams	
Player	Team	Player	Team	Player	Team	Player	Team

=== Week Three ===
Date	Time	Visiting team	Home team	Site	Broadcast	Result	Attendance	Reference
September 14	12:00 PM	Presbyterian	**Furman**	Paladin Stadium • Greenville, SC		**W** 21–20	6,500	
September 14	2:00 PM	**Samford**	Florida A&M	Bragg Memorial Stadium • Tallahassee, FL		**W** 27–20	10,034	
September 14	3:30 PM	**The Citadel**	**Western Carolina**	E. J. Whitmire Stadium • Cullowhee, NC		**CIT** 28–21	9,345	
September 14	6:00 PM	Austin Peay	**Chattanooga**	Finley Stadium • Chattanooga, TN		**W** 42–10	9,189	
September 14	6:00 PM	**Elon**	North Carolina A&T	Aggie Stadium • Greensboro, NC		**L** 10–23	13,221	
September 14	7:00 PM	**Georgia Southern**	**Wofford**	Gibbs Stadium • Spartanburg, SC		**WOF** 30–20	8,153	

Players of the week:

Offensive		Defensive		Freshman		Special teams	
Player	Team	Player	Team	Player	Team	Player	Team

=== Week Four ===
Date	Time	Visiting team	Home team	Site	Broadcast	Result	Attendance	Reference
September 21	2:00 PM	Southeastern Louisiana	**Samford**	Seibert Stadium • Homewood, AL		**L** 31–34	4,598	
September 21	3:30 PM	Mars Hill	**Western Carolina**	E. J. Whitmire Stadium • Cullowhee, NC		**W** 30–23	7,490	
September 21	6:00 PM	**Appalachian State**	**Elon**	Rhodes Stadium • Elon, NC		**ASU** 31–21	9,782	
September 21	6:00 PM	**The Citadel**	Old Dominion	Foreman Field • Norfolk, VA	COX	**L** 58–59	20,118	
September 21	7:00 PM	Gardner–Webb	**Wofford**	Gibbs Stadium • Spartanburg, SC		**L** 0–3	6,207	

Players of the week:

Offensive		Defensive		Freshman		Special teams	
Player	Team	Player	Team	Player	Team	Player	Team

=== Week Five ===
Date	Time	Visiting team	Home team	Site	Broadcast	Result	Attendance	Reference

Players of the week:

Offensive		Defensive		Freshman		Special teams	
Player	Team	Player	Team	Player	Team	Player	Team

== Records against other conferences ==
=== FCS conferences ===
Conference	Record
Big Sky	0–1
Big South	1–4
CAA	0–0
Ivy League	0–0
Independents	0–1
MEAC	2–2
MVFC	0–0
NEC	1–0
OVC	1–1
Patriot	0–0
Pioneer	0–0
Southland	0–1
SWAC	0–0
Total	5–10

=== FBS conferences ===
Conference	Record
American	0–0
ACC	0–2
Big 12	0–1
C-USA	0–1
Independents	0–0
MAC	0–0
SEC	0–1
Sun Belt	2–0
Total	2–5

== Attendance ==
Team	Stadium	Capacity	Game 1	Game 2	Game 3	Game 4	Game 5	Game 6	Game 7	Game 8	Total	Average	% of Capacity
Appalachian State	Kidd Brewer Stadium	30,856	25,723								25,723	25,723	83%
Chattanooga	Finley Stadium	20,668	11,163	9,189							20,352	10,176	49%
The Citadel	Johnson Hagood Stadium	21,000	12,196	14,545							26,741	13,371	64%
Elon	Rhodes Stadium	13,000	7,112	9,782							16,894	8,447	65%
Furman	Paladin Stadium	16,000	6,500								6,500	6,500	41%
Georgia Southern	Paulson Stadium	18,000	16,528	13,758							30,286	15,143	84%
Samford	Seibert Stadium	6,700	4,598								4,598	4,598	69%
Western Carolina	E.J. Whitmire Stadium	13,742	9,345	7,490							16,835	8,418	61%
Wofford	Gibbs Stadium	13,000	8,153	6,207							14,360	7,180	55%

== NFL draft ==
The following list includes all SoCon players who were drafted in the 2014 NFL draft.

Round #	Pick #	NFL team	Player	Position	College
3	96	Minnesota Vikings	Jerick McKinnon	RB	Georgia Southern
4	137	New York Jets	Dakota Dozier	G	Furman
7	252	Cincinnati Bengals	Lavelle Westbrooks	CB	Georgia Southern
