= Travis Swanson =

American football player (born 1991)

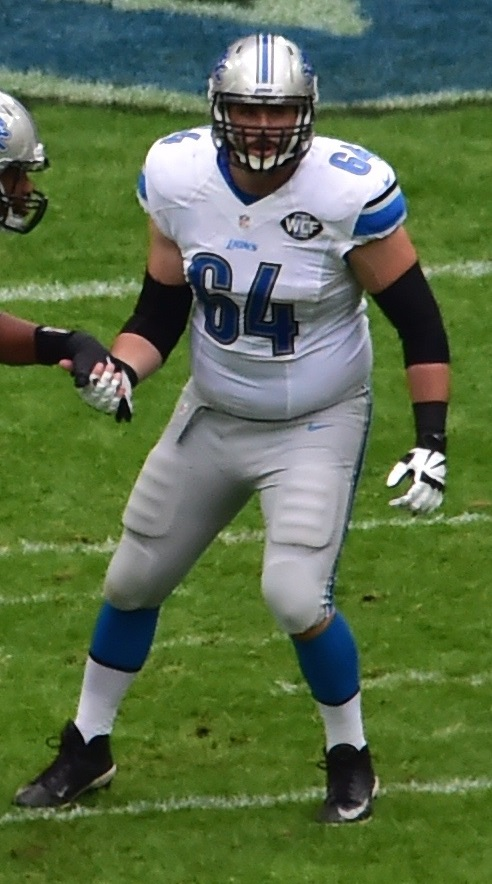
- Swanson with the Detroit Lions in 2014

No. 64, 66
- Position: Center

Personal information
- Born: January 30, 1991 (age 35); Concord, California, U.S.
- Listed height: 6 ft 5 in (1.96 m)
- Listed weight: 304 lb (138 kg)

Career information
- High school: Kingwood (Houston, Texas)
- College: Arkansas
- NFL draft: 2014: 3rd round, 76th overall pick

Career history
- Detroit Lions (2014–2017); New York Jets (2018)*; Miami Dolphins (2018)
- * Offseason or practice squad member only

Awards and highlights
- First-team All-American (2013); 2× Second-team All-SEC (2012, 2013)

Career NFL statistics
- Games played: 65
- Games started: 53
- Stats at Pro Football Reference

Travis Swanson (born January 30, 1991) is an American former professional football player who was a center in the National Football League (NFL). He was selected by the Detroit Lions in the third round of the 2014 NFL draft. He played college football for the Arkansas Razorbacks.

== Early life ==
A native of Houston, Texas, Swanson attended Kingwood High School, where he played high school football. He was coached by Dougald McDougald. During his senior year, he graded out at 84% on the season. Swanson was named one of 10 finalists for the 2008 Greater Houston Area Offensive Player of the Year—eventually won by Russell Shepard—and was the only lineman among the finalists. He was also a first-team all-state selection by the writers and a second-team honoree by the coaches.

Regarded as a three-star recruit by Rivals.com, Swanson was ranked as the No. 73 offensive tackle prospect in the class of 2009, which was highlighted by D. J. Fluker and Mason Walters. Swanson chose Arkansas over offers from Arizona, Kansas, and Texas Tech.

== College career ==
After being redshirted as a freshman in 2009, he took over as the Razorbacks starting center in 2010. The Razorbacks, who started the same offensive line every game, broke 24 game or season school records on offense in 2010. Quarterback Ryan Mallett set the Arkansas single-season passing yards record with 3,869 and running back Knile Davis posted the fourth-highest single-season rushing yards total in program history with 1,322 yards. Arkansas finished the season first in the Southeastern Conference (SEC) and fourth in the NCAA in passing (333.7), becoming just the third team since 1992 to lead the conference in passing in consecutive seasons. Swanson was named to the SEC All-Freshman Team.

As a sophomore, Swanson started every game at center for a Razorback offense that led the SEC in total offense, passing offense and scoring offense to become just the fifth different school, and first since 2001, to lead the conference in all three categories in a single season and became the sixth team in conference history, and second since 1992, to lead the SEC in passing offense for three straight seasons.

In his junior year, Swanson was named team captain and started all 12 games at center in an offensive line that allowed 1.0 or fewer sacks in eight games in 2012 and ranked third in the SEC with an average of just 1.58 sacks allowed per game.

Swanson was a second-team All-SEC selection, and a first-team All-American by USA Today, making him just the third center in program history to earn All-American honors, joining Jonathan Luigs in 2007 and Rodney Brand in 1969.

== Professional career ==
Pre-draft measurables
Height	Weight	Arm length	Hand span	Bench press
6 ft 5 in (1.96 m)	312 lb (142 kg)	33 1/8 in (0.84 m)	10 in (0.25 m)	20 reps
All values from NFL Combine

=== Detroit Lions ===
Swanson was selected by the Detroit Lions in the third round (76th overall) of the 2014 NFL draft.

On December 28, 2014, Swanson made his first career start at center against the Green Bay Packers. On January 2, 2016, Swanson was placed on injured reserve due to a shoulder injury.

In 2017, Swanson started 11 games before being placed on injured reserve on December 29, 2017 with a concussion.

=== New York Jets ===
On April 4, 2018, Swanson signed with the New York Jets. He was released on September 1, 2018.

=== Miami Dolphins ===
On September 3, 2018, Swanson was signed by the Miami Dolphins, but was released the next day. He was re-signed on September 11, 2018. He started 11 games at center after a season-ending injury to Daniel Kilgore in Week 4.

Swanson announced his retirement from football on May 19, 2019.
