= 2013 Furman Paladins football team =

American college football season

2013 Furman Paladins football

SoCon co-champion

NCAA Division I Second Round, L 7–38 at North Dakota State
- Conference: Southern Conference

Ranking
- Sports Network: No. 22
- FCS Coaches: No. 21
- Record: 8–6 (6–2 SoCon)
- Head coach: Bruce Fowler (3rd season)
- Offensive coordinator: Jimmy Kiser (3rd season)
- Defensive coordinator: John Windham (3rd season)
- Captains: Reese Hannon; Greg Worthy; Dakota Dozier
- Home stadium: Paladin Stadium

2013 Southern Conference football standings
	Conf.			Overall
Team	W		L	W		L
No. 22 Furman +^	6	–	2	8	–	6
No. 19 Samford +^	6	–	2	8	–	5
No. 23 Chattanooga +	6	–	2	8	–	4
Georgia Southern *	4	–	4	7	–	4
Wofford	4	–	4	5	–	6
The Citadel	4	–	4	5	–	7
Appalachian State *	4	–	4	4	–	8
Elon	1	–	7	2	–	10
Western Carolina	1	–	7	2	–	10
+ – Conference co-champions; ^ – FCS playoff participant; * – Appalachian State and Georgia Southern ineligible for conference championship and FCS playoffs as part of FBS transition; Rankings from The Sports Network Poll

The 2013 Furman Paladins team represented Furman University as a member of the Southern Conference (SoCon) during the 2013 NCAA Division I FCS football season. Led by third-year head coach Bruce Fowler, the Paladins compiled an overall record of 8–6 with a mark of 6–2 in conference play, sharing the SoCon title with Chattanooga and Samford. Furman advanced to the NCAA Division I Football Championship playoffs, where they beat South Carolina State in the first round before falling to the eventual national champion, North Dakota State, in the second round. The team played home games at Paladin Stadium in Greenville, South Carolina.

== Schedule ==
Date	Time	Opponent	Site	TV	Result	Attendance
August 31	6:00 pm	at Gardner–Webb	Ernest W. Spangler Stadium; Boiling Springs, NC	WMYA	L 21–28	3,876
September 7	6:00 pm	at No. 24 Coastal Carolina*	Brooks Stadium; Conway, SC	WMYA	L 28–35	8,636
September 14	12:00 pm	Presbyterian*	Paladin Stadium; Greenville, SC		W 21–20	6,500
September 28	6:00 pm	at The Citadel	Johnson Hagood Stadium; Charleston, SC		W 24–17	12,693
October 5	1:30 pm	Elon	Paladin Stadium; Greenville, SC	ESPN3	L 25–28	10,254
October 12	6:00 pm	at Chattanooga	Finley Stadium; Chattanooga, TN	ESPN3	L 9–31	12,197
October 19	1:30 pm	Appalachian State	Paladin Stadium; Greenville, SC	PHD	W 27–10	7,322
October 26	7:00 pm	at No. 13 (FBS) LSU*	Tiger Stadium; Baton Rouge, LA	PPV	L 16–48	92,554
November 2	2:00 pm	at Georgia Southern	Paulson Stadium; Staetsboro, GA		W 16–14	12,220
November 9	1:30 pm	No. 20 Samford^{†}	Paladin Stadium; Greenville, SC	PHD	W 35–17	9,127
November 16	3:30 pm	at Western Carolina	Bob Waters Field at E. J. Whitmire Stadium; Cullowhee, NC		W 32–20	8,388
November 23	12:00 pm	Wofford	Paladin Stadium; Greenville, SC (rivalry)	PHD	W 27–14	8,291
November 30	1:00 pm	at No. 25 South Carolina State*	Oliver C. Dawson Stadium; Orangeburg, SC (NCAA Division I FCS Playoffs First Round)	ESPN3	W 30–20	4,871
December 7	3:30 pm	at No. 1 North Dakota State*	Fargodome; Fargo, ND (NCAA Division I FCS Playoffs Second Round)	ESPN3	L 7–38	18,455
*Non-conference game; ^{†}Homecoming; Rankings from The Sports Network Poll released prior to the game; All times are in Eastern time
