= 2013 Appalachian State Mountaineers football team =

American college football season

2013 Appalachian State Mountaineers football
- Conference: Southern Conference
- Record: 4–8 (4–4 SoCon)
- Head coach: Scott Satterfield (1st season)
- Co-offensive coordinators: Frank Ponce (1st season); Dwayne Ledford (1st season)
- Offensive scheme: Spread option
- Defensive coordinator: Nate Woody (1st season)
- Base defense: 3–4
- Home stadium: Kidd Brewer Stadium

2013 Southern Conference football standings
	Conf.			Overall
Team	W		L	W		L
No. 22 Furman +^	6	–	2	8	–	6
No. 19 Samford +^	6	–	2	8	–	5
No. 23 Chattanooga +	6	–	2	8	–	4
Georgia Southern *	4	–	4	7	–	4
Wofford	4	–	4	5	–	6
The Citadel	4	–	4	5	–	7
Appalachian State *	4	–	4	4	–	8
Elon	1	–	7	2	–	10
Western Carolina	1	–	7	2	–	10
+ – Conference co-champions; ^ – FCS playoff participant; * – Appalachian State and Georgia Southern ineligible for conference championship and FCS playoffs as part of FBS transition; Rankings from The Sports Network Poll

The 2013 Appalachian State Mountaineers football team represented Appalachian State University in the 2013 NCAA Division I FCS football season. They were led by first-year head coach Scott Satterfield and played their home games at Kidd Brewer Stadium. They were a member of the Southern Conference. They finished the season 4–8, 4–4 in SoCon play to finish in a four way tie for fourth place. This was their last season in the SoCon and in the FCS as they moved to FBS and the Sun Belt Conference in 2014. They would be ineligible for the playoffs.

== Schedule ==
Date	Time	Opponent	Rank	Site	TV	Result	Attendance
August 31	9:00 p.m.	at No. 20 Montana*	No. 12	Washington–Grizzly Stadium; Missoula, MT	ESPN3	L 6–30	26,293
September 7	6:00 p.m.	North Carolina A&T*	No. 21	Kidd Brewer Stadium; Boone, NC	ASTV	L 21–24	25,723
September 21	6:00 p.m.	at Elon		Rhodes Stadium; Elon, NC		W 31–21	9,782
September 28	3:30 p.m.	Charleston Southern*		Kidd Brewer Stadium; Boone, NC	ASTV	L 24–27	29,145
October 5	2:00 p.m.	at The Citadel		Johnson Hagood Stadium; Charleston, SC		L 28–31 ^{OT}	13,601
October 12	3:30 p.m.	No. 23 Samford^{†}		Kidd Brewer Stadium; Boone, NC	ASTV	L 10–34	24,491
October 19	1:30 p.m.	at Furman		Paladin Stadium; Greenville, SC		L 10–27	7,322
October 26	3:30 p.m.	No. 24 Georgia Southern		Kidd Brewer Stadium; Boone, NC (rivalry)	ESPN3	W 38–14	23,901
November 2	3:30 p.m.	Chattanooga		Kidd Brewer Stadium; Boone, NC	ASTV	L 28–35	18,991
November 9	12:30 p.m.	at Georgia*		Sanford Stadium; Athens, GA	ESPN3	L 6–45	92,746
November 16	1:30 p.m.	at No. 24 Wofford		Gibbs Stadium; Spartanburg, SC		W 33–21	8,315
November 23	3:30 p.m.	Western Carolina		Kidd Brewer Stadium; Boone, NC (Battle for the Old Mountain Jug)	ASTV	W 48–27	27,115
*Non-conference game; ^{†}Homecoming; Rankings from The Sports Network Poll released prior to the game; All times are in Eastern time

== Rankings ==
Ranking movements Legend: ██ Increase in ranking ██ Decrease in ranking — = Not ranked RV = Received votes
	Week														
Poll	Pre	1	2	3	4	5	6	7	8	9	10	11	12	13	Final
Sports Network	12	21	RV	RV	RV	—	—	—	—	—	—	—	—	—	—
Coaches	N/A	N/A	N/A	N/A	N/A	N/A	N/A	N/A	N/A	N/A	N/A	N/A	N/A	N/A	N/A

*Ineligible for FCS Coaches Poll

- TSN Poll
