= 2013 Western Carolina Catamounts football team =

American college football season

2013 Western Carolina Catamounts football
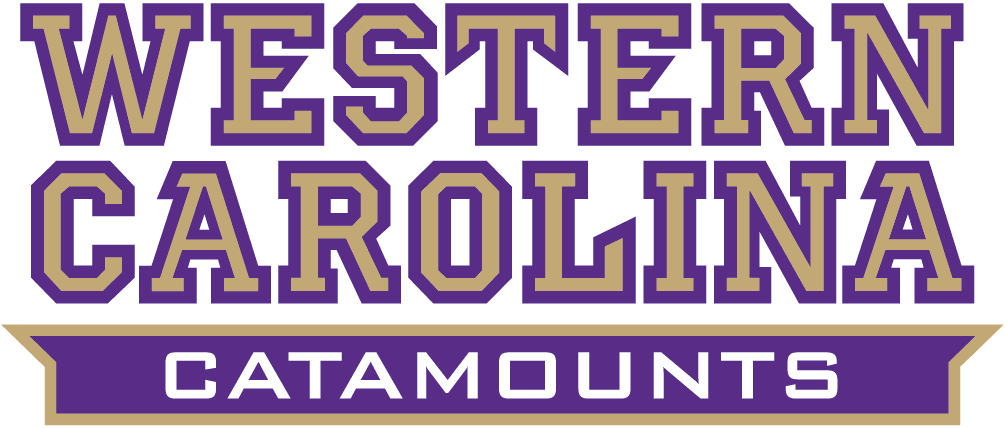
- Conference: Southern Conference
- Record: 2–10 (1–7 SoCon)
- Head coach: Mark Speir (2nd season)
- Offensive coordinator: Brad Glenn (2nd season)
- Defensive coordinator: Shawn Quinn (1st season)
- Home stadium: Bob Waters Field at E. J. Whitmire Stadium

2013 Southern Conference football standings
| | Conf. | | | Overall |
| Team | W | | L | W | | L |
|---|---|---|---|---|---|---|
| No. 22 Furman +^ | 6 | – | 2 | 8 | – | 6 |
| No. 19 Samford +^ | 6 | – | 2 | 8 | – | 5 |
| No. 23 Chattanooga + | 6 | – | 2 | 8 | – | 4 |
| Georgia Southern * | 4 | – | 4 | 7 | – | 4 |
| Wofford | 4 | – | 4 | 5 | – | 6 |
| The Citadel | 4 | – | 4 | 5 | – | 7 |
| Appalachian State * | 4 | – | 4 | 4 | – | 8 |
| Elon | 1 | – | 7 | 2 | – | 10 |
| Western Carolina | 1 | – | 7 | 2 | – | 10 |
+ – Conference co-champions; ^ – FCS playoff participant; * – Appalachian State and Georgia Southern ineligible for conference championship and FCS playoffs as part of FBS transition; Rankings from The Sports Network Poll

The 2013 Western Carolina Catamounts team represented Western Carolina University as a member of the Southern Conference (SoCon) during the 2013 NCAA Division I FCS football season. Led by second-year head coach Mark Speir, the Catamounts compiled an overall record of 2–10 with a mark of 1–7 in conference play, tying for eighth place in the SoCon. Western Carolina played home games at Bob Waters Field at E. J. Whitmire Stadium in Cullowhee, North Carolina.

The Catamounts entered this season with a new defensive coordinator, Shawn Quinn, who joined the team after serving two seasons in the same position at Charleston Southern University.

== Schedule ==
| Date | Time | Opponent | Site | TV | Result | Attendance |
|---|---|---|---|---|---|---|
| August 29 | 6:30 pm | at Middle Tennessee* | Johnny "Red" Floyd Stadium; Murfreesboro, TN | | L 24–45 | 20,011 |
| September 7 | 1:30 pm | at Virginia Tech* | Lane Stadium; Blacksburg, VA | ESPN3 | L 3–45 | 61,335 |
| September 14 | 3:30 pm | The Citadel | Bob Waters Field at E. J. Whitmire Stadium; Cullowhee, NC | WCAA | L 21–28 | 9,345 |
| September 21 | 3:30 pm | Mars Hill* | Bob Waters Field at E. J. Whitmire Stadium; Cullowhee, NC | WCAA | W 30–23 | 7,490 |
| September 28 | 3:00 pm | at Samford | Seibert Stadium; Homewood, AL | | L 23–63 | 8,625 |
| October 5 | 6:00 pm | at Chattanooga | Finley Stadium; Chattanooga, TN | WMYA | L 21–42 | 6,789 |
| October 12 | 2:00 pm | at Auburn* | Jordan–Hare Stadium; Auburn, AL | PPV/ESPN3 | L 3–62 | 84,171 |
| October 19 | 3:30 pm | No. 13 Wofford | Bob Waters Field at E. J. Whitmire Stadium; Cullowhee, NC | ESPN3 | L 17–21 | 3,367 |
| October 26 | 3:30 pm | Elon^{†} | Bob Waters Field at E. J. Whitmire Stadium; Cullowhee, NC | WCAA | W 27–24 ^{OT} | 9,627 |
| November 9 | 2:00 pm | at Georgia Southern | Paulson Stadium; Statesboro, GA | | L 19–35 | 13,507 |
| November 16 | 3:30 pm | Furman | Bob Waters Field at E. J. Whitmire Stadium; Cullowhee, NC | WCAA | L 20–32 | 8,388 |
| November 23 | 3:30 pm | at Appalachian State | Kidd Brewer Stadium; Boone, NC (Battle for the Old Mountain Jug) | | L 27–48 | 27,115 |
*Non-conference game; ^{†}Homecoming; Rankings from The Sports Network Poll released prior to the game; All times are in Eastern time
