= 2013 Georgia Southern Eagles football team =

American college football season

2013 Georgia Southern Eagles football
- Conference: Southern Conference
- Record: 5–4, 2 wins vacated (4–4 SoCon)
- Head coach: Jeff Monken (4th season)
- Offensive coordinator: Brent Davis (4th season)
- Offensive scheme: Triple option
- Co-defensive coordinators: Jack Curtis (3rd season); Kevin Corless (1st season)
- Base defense: 4–3
- Home stadium: Paulson Stadium

2013 Southern Conference football standings
	Conf.			Overall
Team	W		L	W		L
No. 22 Furman +^	6	–	2	8	–	6
No. 19 Samford +^	6	–	2	8	–	5
No. 23 Chattanooga +	6	–	2	8	–	4
Georgia Southern *	4	–	4	7	–	4
Wofford	4	–	4	5	–	6
The Citadel	4	–	4	5	–	7
Appalachian State *	4	–	4	4	–	8
Elon	1	–	7	2	–	10
Western Carolina	1	–	7	2	–	10
+ – Conference co-champions; ^ – FCS playoff participant; * – Appalachian State and Georgia Southern ineligible for conference championship and FCS playoffs as part of FBS transition; Rankings from The Sports Network Poll

The 2013 Georgia Southern Eagles football team represented Georgia Southern University in the 2013 NCAA Division I FCS football season. They were led by fourth-year head coach Jeff Monken and played their home games at Paulson Stadium. They were a member of the Southern Conference. This was Georgia Southern's final year in the Southern Conference and the FCS. They joined the FBS and the Sun Belt Conference for the 2014 season. They finished the season 7–4, 4–4 in SoCon play to finish in a four-way tie for fourth place.

In the final game of the season, against the Florida Gators, the Eagles upset the FBS Gators, 26–20, without completing a pass. The win marked the first time a FCS team defeated the Gators.

At the end of the season, head coach Jeff Monken resigned to become the head coach at Army.

On July 22, 2016, the university announced that it was ordered by the NCAA to vacate two wins from the 2013 season and one win from the 2014 season, due to academically ineligible student-athletes participating in those games. The wins affected in the 2013 season were against the Savannah State Tigers and St. Francis Red Flash.

== Schedule ==
Date	Time	Opponent	Rank	Site	TV	Result	Attendance
August 31	6:00 pm	Savannah State*	No. 9	Paulson Stadium; Statesboro, GA		W 77–9 (vacated)	16,528
September 7	6:00 pm	Saint Francis (PA)*	No. 10	Paulson Stadium; Statesboro, GA	GSAA	W 59–17 (vacated)	13,758
September 14	7:00 pm	at No. 16 Wofford	No. 10	Gibbs Stadium; Spartanburg, SC	GSAA	L 20–30	8,153
September 28	6:00 pm	Chattanooga	No. 15	Paulson Stadium; Statesboro, GA	GSAA	W 23–21	16,827
October 5	3:00 pm	at Samford	No. 16	Seibert Stadium; Homewood, AL		L 34–44	7,896
October 12	1:00 pm	The Citadel	No. 22	Paulson Stadium; Statesboro, GA	GSAA	W 28–21	16,128
October 26	3:30 pm	at Appalachian State	No. 24	Kidd Brewer Stadium; Boone, NC (rivalry)	ESPN3	L 14–38	23,901
November 2	2:00 pm	Furman		Paulson Stadium; Statesboro, GA	GSAA	L 14–16	12,220
November 9	2:00 pm	Western Carolina^{†}		Paulson Stadium; Statesboro, GA	GSAA	W 35–19	13,507
November 16	3:00 pm	at Elon		Rhodes Stadium; Elon, NC		W 38–20	6,104
November 23	2:00 pm	at Florida*		Ben Hill Griffin Stadium; Gainesville, FL	PPV	W 26–20	82,459
*Non-conference game; ^{†}Homecoming; Rankings from The Sports Network Poll released prior to the game; All times are in Eastern time

== Ranking movements ==
Ranking movements Legend: ██ Increase in ranking ██ Decrease in ranking RV = Received votes
	Week														
Poll	Pre	1	2	3	4	5	6	7	8	9	10	11	12	13	Final
Sports Network	9	10	10	14	15	16	22	23	24	RV	RV	RV	RV	RV	RV
Coaches	N/A	N/A	N/A	N/A	N/A	N/A	N/A	N/A	N/A	N/A	N/A	N/A	N/A	N/A	N/A

Ineligible for FCS Coaches Poll

== Game summaries ==
=== At Florida ===
Georgia Southern Eagles at Florida Gators – Game summary

Quarter	1	2	3	4	Total
Eagles	0	7	13	6	26
Gators	3	7	0	10	20

at Ben Hill Griffin Stadium, Gainesville, Florida

- Date: November 23
- Game time: 1:00 p.m. EST
- Game weather: Sunny, 81 °F (27 °C)
- Game attendance: 82,459
- Referee: Marc Curles
- TV: PPV
- Box score, Recap

Game information
First quarter
- FLA – Francisco Velez 27-yard field goal, 8:34. Gators 3–0. Drive: 13 plays, 63 yards, 6:26.

Second quarter

- FLA – Solomon Patton 3-yard pass from Skyler Mornhinweg (Francisco Velez kick), 13:31. Gators 10–0. Drive: 5 plays, 14 yards, 1:39.
- GASO – Kevin Ellison 45-yard run (Younghoe Koo kick), 2:01. Gators 10–7. Drive: 1 play, 45 yards, 0:10.

Third quarter

- GASO – Kevin Ellison 1-yard run (Younghoe Koo kick), 12:24. Eagles 14–10. Drive: 5 plays, 75 yards, 2:36.
- GASO – William Banks 3-yard run (kick failed), 0:32. Eagles 20–10. Drive: 8 plays, 49 yards, 4:02.

Fourth quarter

- FLA – Francisco Velez 22-yard field goal, 12:02. Eagles 20–13. Drive: 8 plays, 32 yards, 3:30.
- FLA – Solomon Patton 46-yard pass from Skyler Mornhinweg (Francisco Velez kick), 5:41. Tied 20–20. Drive: 3 plays, 59 yards, 1:04.
- GASO – Jerick McKinnon 14-yard run (kick failed), 2:57. Eagles 26–20. Drive: 5 plays, 75 yards, 2:44.

Statistics	GASO	FLA
First downs	16	15
Total yards	429	279
Rushing yards	429	157
Passing yards	0	122
Turnovers	2	0
Time of possession	30:23	29:37

Team	Category	Player	Statistics
Georgia Southern	Passing	Kevin Ellison	0/3, 0 yards
Georgia Southern	Rushing	Jerick McKinnon	9 rushes, 125 yards, TD
Georgia Southern	Receiving	None	
Florida	Passing	Skyler Mornhinweg	14/25, 122 yards, 2 TD
Florida	Rushing	Kelvin Taylor	22 rushes, 92 yards
Florida	Receiving	Solomon Patton	4 receptions, 69 yards, 2 TD
