= 2013 Chattanooga Mocs football team =

American college football season

2013 Chattanooga Mocs football

SoCon co-champion
- Conference: Southern Conference

Ranking
- Sports Network: No. 23
- FCS Coaches: No. 25
- Record: 8–4 (6–2 SoCon)
- Head coach: Russ Huesman (5th season)
- Offensive coordinator: Jeff Durden (1st season)
- Defensive coordinator: Adam Braithwaite (1st season)
- Home stadium: Finley Stadium

2013 Southern Conference football standings
	Conf.			Overall
Team	W		L	W		L
No. 22 Furman +^	6	–	2	8	–	6
No. 19 Samford +^	6	–	2	8	–	5
No. 23 Chattanooga +	6	–	2	8	–	4
Georgia Southern *	4	–	4	7	–	4
Wofford	4	–	4	5	–	6
The Citadel	4	–	4	5	–	7
Appalachian State *	4	–	4	4	–	8
Elon	1	–	7	2	–	10
Western Carolina	1	–	7	2	–	10
+ – Conference co-champions; ^ – FCS playoff participant; * – Appalachian State and Georgia Southern ineligible for conference championship and FCS playoffs as part of FBS transition; Rankings from The Sports Network Poll

The 2013 Chattanooga Mocs football team represented the University of Tennessee at Chattanooga in the 2013 NCAA Division I FCS football season as a member of the Southern Conference (SoCon). The Mocs were led by fifth-year head coach Russ Huesman and played their home games at Finley Stadium in Chattanooga, Tennessee. They finished the season 8–4 overall and 6–2 in SoCon play to share the conference championship with Samford and Furman. Chattanooga not receive the conference's automatic bid to the FCS playoffs and did not receive an at-large bid.

== Schedule ==
Date	Time	Opponent	Rank	Site	TV	Result	Attendance
August 29	7:00 pm	UT Martin*	No. 24	Finley Stadium; Chattanooga, TN	MV	L 21–31	11,163
September 7	2:00 pm	at Georgia State*		Georgia Dome; Atlanta, GA	ESPN3	W 42–14	14,952
September 14	6:00 pm	Austin Peay*		Finley Stadium; Chattanooga, TN	MV	W 42–10	9,189
September 28	6:00 pm	at No. 15 Georgia Southern		Paulson Stadium; Statesboro, GA		L 21–23	16,827
October 5	6:00 pm	Western Carolina		Finley Stadium; Chattanooga, TN	WTVC-DT2	W 42–21	6,789
October 12	6:00 pm	Furman		Finley Stadium; Chattanooga, TN	ESPN3	W 31–9	12,197
October 19	1:30 pm	at Elon		Rhodes Stadium; Elon, NC		W 20–9	6,547
October 26	2:00 pm	The Citadel		Finley Stadium; Chattanooga, TN	MV	W 28–24	8,106
November 2	3:30 pm	at Appalachian State		Kidd Brewer Stadium; Boone, NC	MV	W 35–28	18,991
November 9	2:00 pm	No. 17 Wofford	No. 24	Finley Stadium; Chattanooga, TN	ESPN3	W 20–10	12,090
November 16	3:00 pm	at Samford	No. 17	Seibert Stadium; Homewood, AL		L 14–17 ^{OT}	8,415
November 23	2:00 pm	at No. 1 (FBS) Alabama*	No. 23	Bryant–Denny Stadium; Tuscaloosa, AL	PPV	L 0–49	100,179
*Non-conference game; Rankings from The Sports Network Poll released prior to the game; All times are in Eastern time
