= 2013 Samford Bulldogs football team =

American college football season

2013 Samford Bulldogs football
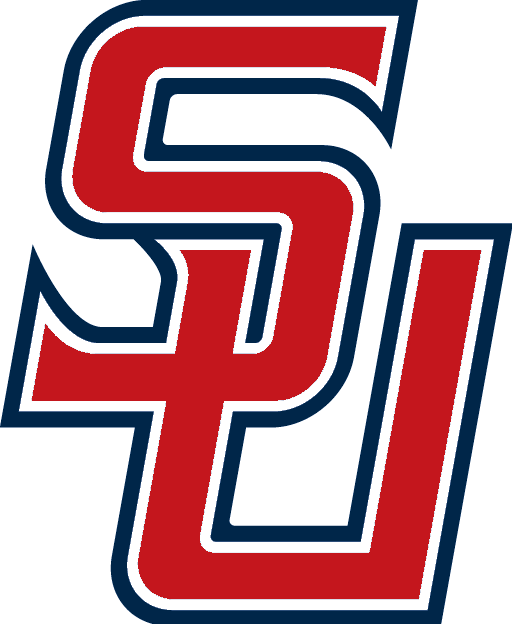

SoCon co-champion

FCS Playoffs First Round, L 14–55 vs. Jacksonville State
- Conference: Southern Conference

Ranking
- Sports Network: No. 19
- FCS Coaches: No. 18
- Record: 8–5 (6–2 SoCon)
- Head coach: Pat Sullivan (7th season)
- Co-offensive coordinators: Brandon Herring (2nd season); Travis Trickett (2nd season)
- Defensive coordinator: Bill D'Ottavio (7th season)
- Home stadium: Seibert Stadium

2013 Southern Conference football standings
	Conf.			Overall
Team	W		L	W		L
No. 22 Furman +^	6	–	2	8	–	6
No. 19 Samford +^	6	–	2	8	–	5
No. 23 Chattanooga +	6	–	2	8	–	4
Georgia Southern *	4	–	4	7	–	4
Wofford	4	–	4	5	–	6
The Citadel	4	–	4	5	–	7
Appalachian State *	4	–	4	4	–	8
Elon	1	–	7	2	–	10
Western Carolina	1	–	7	2	–	10
+ – Conference co-champions; ^ – FCS playoff participant; * – Appalachian State and Georgia Southern ineligible for conference championship and FCS playoffs as part of FBS transition; Rankings from The Sports Network Poll

The 2013 Samford Bulldogs football team represented Samford University in the 2013 NCAA Division I FCS football season. They were led by seventh year head coach Pat Sullivan and played their home games at Seibert Stadium. They were a member of the Southern Conference. They finished the season 8–5, 6–2 in SoCon play to share the conference title with Chattanooga and Furman. They received an at-large bid to the FCS Playoffs where they lost in the first round to Jacksonville State.

== Schedule ==
Date	Time	Opponent	Rank	Site	TV	Result	Attendance
August 30	6:00 pm	at Georgia State*		Georgia Dome; Atlanta, GA		W 31–21	17,606
September 7	6:00 pm	at Arkansas*		War Memorial Stadium; Little Rock, AR	PPV	L 21–31	47,358
September 14	1:00 pm	at Florida A&M*		Bragg Memorial Stadium; Tallahassee, FL		W 27–20	10,034
September 21	2:00 pm	Southeastern Louisiana*		Seibert Stadium; Homewood, AL	SSTV	L 31–34	4,598
September 28	2:00 pm	Western Carolina		Seibert Stadium; Homewood, AL	SSTV	W 63–23	8,625
October 5	2:00 pm	No. 16 Georgia Southern		Seibert Stadium; Homewood, AL	SSTV	W 44–34	7,896
October 12	2:30 pm	at Appalachian State	No. 23	Kidd Brewer Stadium; Boone, NC		W 34–10	24,491
October 26	12:30 pm	at No. 12 Wofford	No. 22	Gibbs Stadium; Spartanburg, SC		W 34–27	7,936
November 2	1:00 pm	at The Citadel	No. 15	Johnson Hagood Stadium; Charleston, SC	ESPN3	L 26–28	13,828
November 9	12:30 pm	at Furman	No. 20	Paladin Stadium; Greenville, SC		L 17–35	9,127
November 16	2:00 pm	No. 17 Chattanooga		Seibert Stadium; Homewood, AL	ESPN3	W 17–14 ^{OT}	8,415
November 23	2:00 pm	Elon	No. 24	Seibert Stadium; Homewood, AL	SSTV	W 33–32	8,025
November 30	7:00 pm	at No. 20 Jacksonville State*	No. 18	JSU Stadium; Jacksonville, AL (NCAA Division I First Round)	ESPN3	L 14–55	8,992
*Non-conference game; Rankings from The Sports Network Poll released prior to the game; All times are in Central time

== Ranking movements ==
Ranking movements Legend: ██ Increase in ranking ██ Decrease in ranking — = Not ranked RV = Received votes
	Week														
Poll	Pre	1	2	3	4	5	6	7	8	9	10	11	12	13	Final
Sports Network	RV	RV	RV	RV	RV	RV	23	22	22	15	20	RV	24	18	19
Coaches	RV	RV	RV	RV	—	—	RV	RV	RV	19	22	RV	23	16	18
