= 2013 Big South Conference football season =

- League: NCAA Division I FCS
- Sport: Football
- Duration: August 29, 2013–December 14, 2013
- Teams: 6
- TV partner(s): ESPN, ESPN3, MASN

2014 NFL Draft
- Top draft pick: Walt Aikens
- Picked by: Miami Dolphins
- Conference champions: Coastal Carolina

Big South Conference football seasons
- ← 2012 2014 →

2013 Big South Conference football standings
	Conf.			Overall
Team	W		L	W		L
No. 7 Coastal Carolina +^	4	–	1	12	–	3
Liberty +	4	–	1	8	–	4
No. 24 Charleston Southern	3	–	2	10	–	3
Gardner–Webb	2	–	3	7	–	5
Presbyterian	1	–	4	3	–	8
VMI	1	–	4	2	–	10
+ – Conference co-champions; ^ – FCS playoff participant; Rankings from The Sports Network poll

The 2013 Big South Conference football season began on Thursday, August 29 and concluded in December with the 2014 NCAA Division I Football Championship. The regular season concluded on November 23, and Coastal Carolina won the conference's regular season championship and automatic bid to the playoffs. The Chanticleers defeated Bethune-Cookman in the first round and Montana in the second round before falling to eventual champion North Dakota State in the quarterfinals.

== Preseason Poll Results ==
First place votes in parentheses

Place	Team	Points
1	Coastal Carolina (9)	84
2	Liberty (6)	80
3	Gardner–Webb	58
4	Charleston Southern	39
T–5	VMI	27
T–5	Presbyterian	27

=== Preseason All-Conference Teams ===
Offensive Player of the Year: Lorenzo Taliaferro, Sr., RB (Coastal Carolina)
Defensive Player of the Year: Quinn Backus, Jr., LB (Coastal Carolina)

Position	Player	Class	Team
First Team Offense
QB	Alex Ross	R–So.	Coastal Carolina
RB	Lorenzo Taliaferro	Sr.	Coastal Carolina
RB	Christian Reyes	Jr.	Charleston Southern
WR	Kenny Cook	R–Jr.	Gardner–Webb
WR	Matt Hazel	Sr.	Coastal Carolina
WR	Darrin Peterson	So.	Liberty
TE	Brandon Apon	R–Sr.	Liberty
OL	Jamey Cheatwood	R–Sr.	Coastal Carolina
OL	Hunter Stewart	Sr.	Liberty
OL	Chad Hamilton	R–Jr.	Coastal Carolina
OL	Drew Herring	R–Sr.	Coastal Carolina
OL	Clayton Truitt	Jr.	Charleston Southern
First Team Defense
DL	Shaquille Riddick	Jr.	Gardner–Webb
DL	Preston Pemasa	Sr.	Gardner–Webb
DL	Chima Uzowihe	So.	Liberty
DL	O.J. Le’iatua Mau	So.	Gardner–Webb
LB	Quinn Backus	Jr.	Coastal Carolina
LB	Tanner Burch	Jr.	Gardner–Webb
LB	Nick Sigmon	R–Jr.	Liberty
LB	Calvin Bryant	Jr.	Charleston Southern
DB	Jacob Hagen	Jr.	Liberty
DB	Walt Aikens	R–Sr.	Liberty
DB	Kevin Fogg	R–Sr.	Liberty
DB	Keon Williams	Sr.	Gardner–Webb
First Team Special Teams
PK	Alex Catron	Jr.	Coastal Carolina
P	Jordan Day	R–Sr.	Gardner–Webb
LS	Richard Wright	R–Sr.	Liberty
KR	Devin Brown	Fr.	Coastal Carolina
PR	Jeremiah McKie	Jr.	Presbyterian

== Rankings ==
Legend
Increase in ranking
Decrease in ranking
Not ranked previous week

		Pre	Wk 1	Wk 2	Wk 3	Wk 4	Wk 5	Wk 6	Wk 7	Wk 8	Wk 9	Wk 10	Wk 11	Wk 12	Wk 13	Final
Charleston Southern	TSN	–	RV	–	–	RV	RV	RV	RV	RV	24	18	13	18	23	24
Charleston Southern	C	–	RV	–	–	–	RV	25	24	24	18	16	12	16	20	22
Coastal Carolina	TSN	25	24	21	15	12	9	8	6	6	6	5	11	11	11	7
Coastal Carolina	C	21	22	21	15	11	6	6	4	3	3	3	9	7	11	7
Gardner–Webb	TSN	–	RV	RV	RV	25	25	RV	RV	RV	–	–	–	RV	RV	RV
Gardner–Webb	C	RV	–	–	RV	RV	24	RV	–	–	–	–	–	–	–	–
Liberty	TSN	RV	RV	RV	RV	RV	RV	–	–	–	–	–	RV	RV	RV	RV
Liberty	C	RV	–	–	–	–	–	–	–	–	–	–	–	–	RV	RV
Presbyterian	TSN	–	–	–	–	–	–	–	–	–	–	–	–	–	–	–
Presbyterian	C	–	–	–	–	–	–	–	–	–	–	–	–	–	–	–
VMI	TSN	–	–	–	–	–	–	–	–	–	–	–	–	–	–	–
VMI	C	–	–	–	–	–	–	–	–	–	–	–	–	–	–	–

== Regular season ==
Index to colors and formatting
Big South member won
Big South member lost
Big South teams in **bold**

All times Eastern time.

=== Week One ===
Date	Time	Visiting team	Home team	Site	Broadcast	Result	Attendance	Reference
August 29	6:00 PM	**Liberty**	Kent State	Dix Stadium • Kent, OH	ESPN3	**L** 10–17	20,790	
August 29	6:30 PM	**Presbyterian**	Wake Forest	BB&T Field • Winston-Salem, NC	ESPN3	**L** 7–31	26,202	
August 31	6:00 PM	**Coastal Carolina**	South Carolina State	Oliver C. Dawson Stadium • Orangeburg, SC		**W** 27–20	10,048	
August 31	6:00 PM	**Charleston Southern**	The Citadel	Johnson Hagood Stadium • Charleston, SC		**W** 32–29	12,196	
August 31	6:00 PM	**VMI**	Richmond	Robins Stadium • Richmond, VA		**L** 0–34	8,700	
August 31	6:45 PM	Furman	**Gardner–Webb**	Ernest W. Spangler Stadium • Boiling Springs, NC	ESPN3	**W** 28–21	3,876	

=== Week Two ===
Date	Time	Visiting team	Home team	Site	Broadcast	Result	Attendance	Reference
September 7	11:00 AM	Shorter	**Charleston Southern**	Buccaneer Field • Charleston, SC		**W** 23–15	3,812	
September 7	1:30 PM	Glenville State	**VMI**	Alumni Memorial Field • Lexington, VA		**W** 34–27	5,316	
September 7	2:00 PM	Brevard	**Presbyterian**	Bailey Memorial Stadium • Clinton, SC		**W** 42–24	4,027	
September 7	6:00 PM	Furman	**Coastal Carolina**	Brooks Stadium • Conway, SC	ESPN3	**W** 35–28	8,636	
September 7	6:30 PM	**Gardner–Webb**	Marshall	Joan C. Edwards Stadium • Huntington, WV		**L** 0–55	26,317	
September 7	7:00 PM	Monmouth	**Liberty**	Williams Stadium • Lynchburg, VA	ESPN3	**W** 45–15	18,467	

=== Week Three ===
Date	Time	Visiting team	Home team	Site	Broadcast	Result	Attendance	Reference
September 14	12:00 PM	**Presbyterian**	Furman	Paladin Stadium • Greenville, SC		**L** 20–21	6,500	
September 14	1:30 PM	North Greenville	**VMI**	Alumni Memorial Field • Lexington, VA		**L** 24–37	4,494	
September 14	6:00 PM	**Charleston Southern**	Campbell	Barker-Lane Stadium • Buies Creek, NC		**W** 30–10	6,044	
September 14	6:00 PM	**Coastal Carolina**	Eastern Kentucky	Roy Kidd Stadium • Richmond, KY		**W** 51–32	14,500	
September 14	6:00 PM	Richmond	**Gardner–Webb**	Ernest W. Spangler Stadium • Boiling Springs, NC	ESPN3	**W** 12–10	5,590	
September 14	7:00 PM	Morgan State	**Liberty**	Williams Stadium • Lynchburg, VA	ESPN3	**W** 38–10	15,488	

=== Week Four ===
Date	Time	Visiting team	Home team	Site	Broadcast	Result	Attendance	Reference
September 21	3:30 PM	**VMI**	Virginia	Scott Stadium • Charlottesville, VA		**L** 0–49	40,165	
September 21	4:00 PM	**Charleston Southern**	Norfolk State	Dick Price Stadium • Norfolk, VA		**W** 20–12	5,963	
September 21	6:00 PM	**Liberty**	Richmond	Robins Stadium • Richmond, VA		**L** 21–30	8,076	
September 21	6:00 PM	Hampton	**Coastal Carolina**	Brooks Stadium • Conway, SC		**W** 50–17	9,386	
September 21	6:00 PM	**Gardner–Webb**	Wofford	Gibbs Stadium • Spartanburg, SC		**W** 3–0	6,207	

=== Week Five ===
Date	Time	Visiting team	Home team	Site	Broadcast	Result	Attendance	Reference
September 28	1:30 PM	Robert Morris	**VMI**	Alumni Memorial Field • Lexington, VA		**L** 31–37 ^{2OT}	4,821	
September 28	1:30 PM	**Coastal Carolina**	Elon	Rhodes Stadium • Elon, NC		**W** 53–28	10,277	
September 28	2:00 PM	Charlotte	**Presbyterian**	Bailey Memorial Stadium • Clinton, SC	ESPN3	**L** 21–45	5,268	
September 28	3:30 PM	**Charleston Southern**	Appalachian State	Kidd Brewer Stadium • Boone, NC		**W** 27–24	29,145	
September 28	6:00 PM	Point	**Gardner–Webb**	Ernest W. Spangler Stadium • Boiling Springs, NC		**W** 55–7	4,890	
September 28	7:00 PM	Kentucky Wesleyan	**Liberty**	Williams Stadium • Lynchburg, VA	ESPN3	**W** 73–7	15,807	

=== Week Six ===
Date	Time	Visiting team	Home team	Site	Broadcast	Result	Attendance	Reference
October 5	11:00 AM	North Greenville	**Charleston Southern**	Buccaneer Field • Charleston, SC		**W** 28–14	4,523	
October 5	12:00 PM	**Gardner–Webb**	Charlotte	Jerry Richardson Stadium • Charlotte, NC		**L** 51–53	12,222	
October 5	1:30 PM	**Presbyterian**	Wofford	Gibbs Stadium • Spartanburg, SC		**L** 14–55	7,820	
October 5	6:00 PM	**Liberty**	Old Dominion	S.B. Ballard Stadium • Norfolk, VA		**L** 17–21	20,118	

=== Week Seven ===
Date	Time	Visiting team	Home team	Site	Broadcast	Result	Attendance	Reference
October 12	1:30 PM	**Charleston Southern**	**VMI**	Alumni Memorial Field • Lexington, VA		**CSU** 25–17	5,902	
October 12	6:00 PM	**Gardner–Webb**	**Coastal Carolina**	Brooks Stadium • Conway, SC	ESPN3	**CCU** 42–7	7,819	

=== Week Eight ===
Date	Time	Visiting team	Home team	Site	Broadcast	Result	Attendance	Reference
October 19	2:00 PM	**VMI**	**Presbyterian**	Bailey Memorial Stadium • Clinton, SC		**PC** 49–35	3,032	
October 19	2:00 PM	**Charleston Southern**	Colorado	Folsom Field • Boulder, CO		**L** 10–43	36,730	
October 19	3:00 PM	**Coastal Carolina**	**Liberty**	Williams Stadium • Lynchburg, VA	ESPN3	**CCU** 55–52 ^{2OT}	18,911	

=== Week Nine ===
Date	Time	Visiting team	Home team	Site	Broadcast	Result	Attendance	Reference
October 26	1:00 PM	Charlotte	**Charleston Southern**	Buccaneer Field • Charleston, SC		**W** 36–14	4,319	
October 26	1:30 PM	**Liberty**	**Gardner–Webb**	Ernest W. Spangler Stadium • Boiling Springs, NC	ESPN3	**LU** 24–0	6,430	
October 26	2:00 PM	Point	**Presbyterian**	Bailey Memorial Stadium • Clinton, SC		**W** 49–19	4,689	
October 26	6:00 PM	**VMI**	**Coastal Carolina**	Brooks Stadium • Conway, SC		**CCU** 66–27	7,174	

=== Week Ten ===
Date	Time	Visiting team	Home team	Site	Broadcast	Result	Attendance	Reference
November 2	1:30 PM	Warner University Royals	**Gardner–Webb**	Ernest W. Spangler Stadium • Boiling Springs, NC		**W** 51–14	3,150	
November 2	2:00 PM	**Charleston Southern**	**Presbyterian**	Bailey Memorial Stadium • Clinton, SC	ESPN3	**CSU** 27–16	3,181	
November 2	3:00 PM	Charlotte	**Coastal Carolina**	Brooks Stadium • Conway, SC		**W** 50–25	9,221	
November 2	3:30 PM	**VMI**	**Liberty**	Williams Stadium • Lynchburg, VA	ESPN3/MASN	**LU** 17–7	18,334	

=== Week Eleven ===
Date	Time	Visiting team	Home team	Site	Broadcast	Result	Attendance	Reference
November 9	1:00 PM	**Coastal Carolina**	**Charleston Southern**	Buccaneer Field • Charleston, SC		**CSU** 31–26	6,135	
November 9	1:00 PM	**Gardner–Webb**	**VMI**	Alumni Memorial Field • Lexington, VA	ESPN3	**VMI** 27–9	4,832	
November 9	3:30 PM	**Presbyterian**	**Liberty**	Williams Stadium • Lynchburg, VA	ESPN3	**LU** 35–14	10,654	

=== Week Twelve ===
Date	Time	Visiting team	Home team	Site	Broadcast	Result	Attendance	Reference
November 16	1:00 PM	**VMI**	The Citadel	Johnson Hagood Stadium • Charleston, SC		**L** 10–31	12,069	
November 16	1:00 PM	**Presbyterian**	**Coastal Carolina**	Brooks Stadium • Conway, SC	ESPN3	**CCU** 46–13	7,035	
November 16	1:30 PM	**Charleston Southern**	**Gardner–Webb**	Ernest W. Spangler Stadium • Boiling Springs, NC		**GWU** 27–10	4,890	
November 16	3:30 PM	Brevard	**Liberty**	Williams Stadium • Lynchburg, VA	ESPN3	**W** 59–21	7,554	

=== Week Thirteen ===
Date	Time	Visiting team	Home team	Site	Broadcast	Result	Attendance	Reference
November 23	11:00 AM	**Liberty**	**Charleston Southern**	Buccaneer Field • Charleston, SC	ESPN3	**LU** 56–14	3,756	
November 23	1:00 PM	**Gardner–Webb**	**Presbyterian**	Bailey Memorial Stadium • Clinton, SC		**GWU** 20–13	3,333	
November 23	1:00 PM	**Coastal Carolina**	#12 South Carolina	Williams-Brice Stadium • Columbia, SC	ESPN3	**L** 10–70	81,411	
November 23	1:30 PM	Bucknell	**VMI**	Alumni Memorial Field • Lexington, VA		**L** 23–35	4,913	

== 2014 NFL draft ==
Rnd.	Pick No.	NFL team	Player	Pos.	College	Conf.	Notes
4	125	Miami Dolphins	Walt Aikens	CB	Liberty	Big South	from San Diego
4	138	Baltimore Ravens	Lorenzo Taliaferro	RB	Coastal Carolina	Big South	
6	190		Matt Hazel	WR	Coastal Carolina	Big South	

== Attendance ==
Team	Stadium	Capacity	Game 1	Game 2	Game 3	Game 4	Game 5	Game 6	Game 7	Total	Average	% of Capacity
Charleston Southern	Buccaneer Field	4,000	3,812	4,523	4,319	6,135	3,756	—	—	22,545	4,509	110.3%
Coastal Carolina	Brooks Stadium	9,112	8,636	9,386	7,819	7,147	9,221	7,035	—	49,244	8,207	90.1%
Gardner–Webb	Ernest W. Spangler Stadium	7,800	3,876	5,590	4,890	6,430	3,150	4,890	—	28,826	4,804	61.6%
Liberty	Williams Stadium	19,200	18,467	15,488	15,807	18,911	18,334	10,654	7,554	105,215	15,031	78.3%
Presbyterian	Bailey Memorial Stadium	6,000	4,027	5,268	3,032	4,689	3,181	3,333	—	23,530	3,922	65.4%
VMI	Alumni Memorial Field	10,000	5,316	4,494	4,821	5,902	4,832	4,913	—	30,278	5,046	50.5%
