= 2013 VMI Keydets football team =

American college football season

2013 VMI Keydets football
- Conference: Big South Conference
- Record: 2–10 (1–4 Big South)
- Head coach: Sparky Woods (6th season)
- Offensive coordinator: Matt Campbell (4th season)
- Defensive coordinator: Greg Harris (1st season)
- Home stadium: Alumni Memorial Field

2013 Big South Conference football standings
	Conf.			Overall
Team	W		L	W		L
No. 7 Coastal Carolina +^	4	–	1	12	–	3
Liberty +	4	–	1	8	–	4
No. 24 Charleston Southern	3	–	2	10	–	3
Gardner–Webb	2	–	3	7	–	5
Presbyterian	1	–	4	3	–	8
VMI	1	–	4	2	–	10
+ – Conference co-champions; ^ – FCS playoff participant; Rankings from The Sports Network poll

The 2013 VMI Keydets football team represented the Virginia Military Institute in the 2013 NCAA Division I FCS football season. They were led by sixth year head coach Sparky Woods and played their home games at Alumni Memorial Field. They are a member of the Big South Conference. 2013 was VMI's final year as a member of the Big South, as they will move to the Southern Conference in 2014.

The season began with a 34–0 shutout defeat at the hands of Richmond on August 31. The Keydets achieved their first win of the year the following week by defeating Glenville State 34–27, thanks to a last second goal-line stand as time expired. After a 37–24 loss to Division II North Greenville, VMI would endure a 7-game losing streak, falling to Virginia, Robert Morris in double overtime, Charleston Southern, Presbyterian, Coastal Carolina, and Liberty.

The Keydets' losing streak was snapped on November 9 with a decisive 27–9 win over Gardner–Webb. This also saw the end of a 9-game conference losing streak. VMI then lost to The Citadel 31–10 in the Military Classic of the South, and ended the year with a 35–23 loss to the Bucknell Bison, finishing the year at 2–10 and 1–4 in Big South play. It was the third straight year VMI won only two games in a season.

== Schedule ==
Date	Time	Opponent	Site	TV	Result	Attendance
August 31	6:00 pm	at No. 15 Richmond*	E. Claiborne Robins Stadium; Richmond, VA		L 0–34	8,700
September 7	1:30 pm	Glenville State*	Alumni Memorial Field; Lexington, VA	BSN	W 34–27	5,316
September 14	1:30 pm	North Greenville*	Alumni Memorial Field; Lexington, VA	BSN	L 24–37	4,494
September 21	3:30 pm	at Virginia*	Scott Stadium; Charlottesville, VA	ESPN3	L 0–49	40,165
September 28	1:30 pm	Robert Morris*	Alumni Memorial Field; Lexington, VA	BSN	L 31–37 ^{OT}	4,821
October 12	1:30 pm	Charleston Southern	Alumni Memorial Field; Lexington, VA	BSN	L 17–25	5,902
October 19	2:00 pm	at Presbyterian	Bailey Memorial Stadium; Clinton, SC	BSN	L 35–49	3,032
October 26	6:00 pm	at No. 6 Coastal Carolina	Brooks Stadium; Conway, SC	BSN	L 27–66	7,174
November 2	3:30 pm	at Liberty	Williams Stadium; Lynchburg, VA	FSN	L 7–17	18,334
November 9	1:30 pm	Gardner–Webb	Alumni Memorial Field; Lexington, VA	ESPN3	W 27–9	4,832
November 16	1:00 pm	at The Citadel*	Johnson Hagood Stadium; Charleston, SC (Military Classic of the South)		L 10–31	12,069
November 23	1:30 pm	Bucknell*	Alumni Memorial Field; Lexington, VA	BSN	L 23–35	4,913
*Non-conference game; Rankings from The Sports Network Poll released prior to the game; All times are in Eastern time

== Game summaries ==
=== Richmond ===
Quarter	1	2	3	4	Total
VMI	0	0	0	0	0
Richmond	7	14	6	7	34

at Robins Stadium (Richmond, VA)

- Game time: 6:00 PM
- Game weather: 89 degrees, Winds 6 MPH
- Game attendance: 8,700
- Referee: Kelvin Hudson

Scoring summary

Quarter	Time	Drive			Team	Scoring information	Score	
Quarter	Time	Plays	Yards	TOP	Team	Scoring information	VMI	RICH
1	10:01	12	77	4:59	RICH	Jacobi Green 7-yard touchdown reception from Michael Strauss, Brandon Jordi kick good	0	7
2	2:19	6	85	2:14	RICH	Ben Edwards 59-yard touchdown reception from Michael Strauss, Brandon Jordi kick good	0	14
2	0:36	6	32	0:50	RICH	Stephen Barnett 12-yard touchdown reception from Michael Strauss, Brandon Jordi kick good	0	21
3	10:09	7	64	2:05	RICH	29-yard field goal by Brandon Jordi	0	24
3	4:25	7	55	2:31	RICH	38-yard field goal by Brandon Jordi	0	27
4	8:58	13	72	6:19	RICH	Hunter Westfall 10-yard touchdown reception from Kyle Lauletta, Brandon Jordi kick good	0	34
"TOP" = time of possession. For other American football terms, see Glossary of American football.							0	34

=== Glenville State ===
Quarter	1	2	3	4	Total
Glenville State	0	7	13	7	27
VMI	7	14	6	7	34

at Alumni Memorial Field (Lexington, VA)

- Game time: 1:30 PM
- Game weather: 80 degrees, Winds 3–5 MPH
- Game attendance: 5,316
- Referee: Matt Young

Scoring summary

Quarter	Time	Drive			Team	Scoring information	Score	
Quarter	Time	Plays	Yards	TOP	Team	Scoring information	GSU	VMI
1	7:59	7	77	3:26	VMI	James Rogers 8-yard touchdown reception from Eric Kordenbrock, Dillon Christopher kick good	0	7
2	14:25	5	80	2:53	VMI	Mario Thompson 38-yard touchdown reception from Eric Kordenbrock, Dillon Christopher kick good	0	14
2	11:19	7	75	3:06	GSU	Steffen Colon 1-yard touchdown run, Ryan Cullen kick good	7	14
2	0:55	9	61	3:53	VMI	Eric Kordenbrock 1-yard touchdown run, Dillon Christopher kick good	7	21
3	13:40	3	71	1:20	VMI	Derrick Ziglar 56-yard touchdown reception from Eric Kordenbrock, Dillon Christopher kick nogood	7	20
3	11:45	5	52	1:55	GSU	Delvon Purvis 24-yard touchdown reception from Steffen Colon, Ryan Cullen kick good	14	27
3	1:33	1	51	0:09	GSU	Rahmann Lee 51-yard touchdown run, Ryan Cullen kick nogood	20	27
4	13:27	8	76	3:06	VMI	Bradley Hann 10-yard touchdown reception from Eric Kordenbrock, Dillon Christopher kick good	20	34
4	6:48	10	81	2:52	GSU	Rahmann Lee 36-yard touchdown reception from Steffen Colon, Ryan Cullen kick good	27	34
"TOP" = time of possession. For other American football terms, see Glossary of American football.							27	34

=== North Greenville ===
Quarter	1	2	3	4	Total
North Greenville	10	13	14	0	37
VMI	0	10	7	7	24

at Alumni Memorial Field (Lexington, VA)

- Game time: 1:30 PM
- Game weather: 64 degrees, Winds 5 MPH Northeast
- Game attendance: 4,494
- Referee: Dennis Hennigan

Scoring summary

Quarter	Time	Drive			Team	Scoring information	Score	
Quarter	Time	Plays	Yards	TOP	Team	Scoring information	NGU	VMI
1	11:04	9	72	3:56	NGU	22-yard field goal by J. Gravely	3	0
1	3:44	5	53	1:45	NGU	D. Rouse 23-yard touchdown reception from N. Hughes, J. Gravely kick good	10	0
2	10:20	12	44	4:31	NGU	27-yard field goal by J. Gravely	13	0
2	8:57	4	64	1:23	VMI	Doug Burton 47-yard touchdown reception from Eric Kordenbrock, Dillon Christopher kick good	13	7
2	3:46	13	39	5:11	NGU	45-yard field goal by J. Gravely	16	7
2	0:35	6	59	0:58	NGU	F. Martino 25-yard touchdown reception from N. Hughes, J. Gravely kick good	23	7
2	0:00	4	56	0:35	VMI	37-yard field goal by Dillon Christopher	23	10
3	11:56	4	22	0:52	NGU	T. Walker 2-yard touchdown run, J. Gravely kick good	30	10
3	5:22	7	62	2:54	VMI	Derrick Ziglar 22-yard touchdown run, Dillon Christopher kick good	30	10
3	2:37	9	84	2:45	NGU	N. Hughes 14-yard touchdown run, J. Gravely kick good	37	17
4	0:24	14	94	3:44	VMI	Samuel Patterson 6-yard touchdown reception from Eric Kordenbrock, Dillon Christopher kick good	37	24
"TOP" = time of possession. For other American football terms, see Glossary of American football.							37	24

=== Virginia ===
Quarter	1	2	3	4	Total
VMI	0	0	0	0	0
Virginia	0	21	21	7	49

at Scott Stadium (Charlottesville, VA)

- Game time: 3:30 PM
- Game weather: 68 degrees, Winds 10 MPH Southeast
- Game attendance: 40,165
- Referee: Riley Johnson

Scoring summary

Quarter	Time	Drive			Team	Scoring information	Score	
Quarter	Time	Plays	Yards	TOP	Team	Scoring information	VMI	UVA
2	12:38	3	70	0:54	UVA	Kevin Parks 61-yard touchdown run, Ian Frye kick good	0	7
2	3:09	12	62	4:57	UVA	Kevin Parks 2-yard touchdown run, Ian Frye kick good	0	14
2	2:00	2	59	0:34	UVA	Tim Smith 38-yard touchdown reception from David Watford, Ian Frye kick good	0	21
3	14:26	2	61	0:34	UVA	Daniel Hamm 7-yard touchdown run, Ian Frye kick good	0	28
3	8:27	11	67	4:03	UVA	Jake McGee 4-yard touchdown reception from David Watford, Ian Frye kick good	0	35
3	3:06	8	52	2:22	UVA	David Watford 1-yard touchdown run, Ian Frye kick good	0	42
4	13:52	10	67	2:27	UVA	Daniel Hamm 12-yard touchdown run, Ian Frye kick good	0	49
"TOP" = time of possession. For other American football terms, see Glossary of American football.							0	49

=== Robert Morris ===
Quarter	1	2	3	4	OT	2OT	Total
Robert Morris	7	7	7	10	0	6	37
VMI	7	10	7	7	0	0	31

at Alumni Memorial Field (Lexington, VA)

- Game time: 1:30 PM
- Game weather: 68 degrees, Winds 3–5 MPH
- Game attendance: 4,821
- Referee: Jeff Flanagan

Scoring summary

Quarter	Time	Drive			Team	Scoring information	Score	
Quarter	Time	Plays	Yards	TOP	Team	Scoring information	RMU	VMI
1	6:09	7	66	3:43	RMU	Donte Jeter 4-yard touchdown reception from Paul Jones, Hunter Khaleghi kick good	7	0
1	4:45	3	75	1:24	VMI	Matthew Nicholson 10-yard touchdown reception from Eric Kordenbrock, Dillon Christopher kick good	7	7
2	14:37	–	–	–	RMU	Antwan Eddie 88-yard punt return, Hunter Khaleghi kick good	14	7
2	9:41	15	66	4:56	VMI	26-yard field goal by Dillon Christopher	14	10
2	1:02	6	76	1:50	VMI	Jabari Turner 12-yard touchdown run, Dillon Christopher kick good	14	17
3	11:38	5	65	1:15	VMI	Dane Forlines 36-yard touchdown reception from Eric Kordenbrock, Dillon Christopher kick good	14	24
3	3:21	5	52	2:00	RMU	Corey Garry 1-yard touchdown run, Hunter Khaleghi kick good	21	24
4	13:01	6	62	2:40	RMU	Tyler Digby 16-yard touchdown reception from Paul Jones, Hunter Khaleghi kick good	28	24
4	3:01	5	27	0:54	RMU	40-yard field goal by Hunter Khaleghi	31	24
4	0:01	7	68	1:34	VMI	Matthew Nicholson 39-yard touchdown reception from Eric Kordenbrock, Dillon Christopher kick good	31	31
OT	–	2	25	–	RMU	Deontae Howard 17-yard touchdown run	37	31
"TOP" = time of possession. For other American football terms, see Glossary of American football.							37	31

=== Charleston Southern ===
Quarter	1	2	3	4	Total
Charleston Southern	13	0	9	3	25
VMI	0	14	3	0	17

at Alumni Memorial Field (Lexington, VA)

- Game time: 1:30 PM
- Game weather: 64 degrees, Winds 8-10 MPH
- Game attendance: 5,902
- Referee: Duane Heydt

Scoring summary

Quarter	Time	Drive			Team	Scoring information	Score	
Quarter	Time	Plays	Yards	TOP	Team	Scoring information	CSU	VMI
1	14:34	1	27	0:08	CSU	Kevin Glears 27-yard touchdown reception from Daniel Crogan III, T.J. Higgins kick good	7	0
1	4:34	2	46	0:33	CSU	Christian Reyes 4-yard touchdown run, T.J. Higgins kick no good	13	0
2	5:44	8	74	4:14	VMI	Samuel Patterson 31-yard touchdown reception from Eric Kordenbrock, Dillon Christopher kick good	13	7
2	1:06	7	72	2:02	VMI	Matthew Nicholson 15-yard touchdown reception from Eric Kordenbrock, Dillon Christopher kick good	13	14
3	7:04	17	70	7:56	CSU	22-yard field goal by Mark DeBoy	16	14
3	2:06	12	51	4:58	VMI	45-yard field goal by Dillon Christopher	16	17
3	0:01	4	75	2:05	CSU	Larry Jones III 48-yard touchdown reception from Daniel Crogan III, 2-point pass failed	22	17
4	7:38	11	69	5:49	CSU	22-yard field goal by Mark DeBoy	25	17
"TOP" = time of possession. For other American football terms, see Glossary of American football.							25	17

=== Presbyterian ===
Quarter	1	2	3	4	Total
VMI	7	0	7	21	35
Presbyterian	0	14	21	14	49

at Bailey Memorial Stadium (Clinton, SC)

- Game time: 2:00 PM
- Game weather: 66 degrees, Winds 8 MPH Southwest
- Game attendance: 3,032
- Referee: Jeff Heaser

Scoring summary

Quarter	Time	Drive			Team	Scoring information	Score	
Quarter	Time	Plays	Yards	TOP	Team	Scoring information	VMI	PC
1	2:23	6	99	2:22	VMI	Derrick Ziglar 2-yard touchdown run, Dillon Christopher kick good	7	0
2	14:29	7	73	2:54	PC	Tobi Antigha 12-yard touchdown reception from Heys McMath, Stephen Doar kick good	7	7
2	0:40	12	80	4:47	PC	Demarcus Rouse 1-yard touchdown run, Stephen Doar kick good	7	14
3	14:47	–	–	–	PC	Jeremiah McKie 97-yard kickoff return, Stephen Doar kick good	7	21
3	11:18	7	82	3:29	VMI	Samuel Patterson 20-yard touchdown reception from A.J. Augustine, Dillon Christopher kick good	14	21
3	4:43	4	26	0:37	PC	Heys McMath 1-yard touchdown run, Stephen Doar kick good	14	28
3	0:14	8	57	3:58	PC	Tobi Antigha 16-yard touchdown reception from Heys McMath, Stephen Doar kick good	14	35
4	13:10	7	69	2:04	VMI	Derrick Ziglar 2-yard touchdown run, Dillon Christopher kick good	21	35
4	9:37	6	62	3:33	PC	Seth Moreland 3-yard touchdown run, Stephen Doar kick good	21	42
4	4:32	10	65	5:05	VMI	Samuel Patterson 11-yard touchdown reception from A.J. Augustine, Dillon Christopher kick good	28	42
4	1:01	5	98	1:55	VMI	Matthew Nicholson 61-yard touchdown reception from A.J. Augustine, Dillon Christopher kick good	35	42
4	0:47	2	44	0:14	PC	Tobi Antigha 39-yard touchdown run, Stephen Doar kick good	35	49
"TOP" = time of possession. For other American football terms, see Glossary of American football.							35	49

=== Coastal Carolina ===
Quarter	1	2	3	4	Total
VMI	7	17	3	0	27
Coastal Carolina	13	17	22	14	66

at Brooks Stadium (Conway, SC)

- Game time: 6:00 PM
- Game weather: 59 degrees, Winds 6 MPH West
- Game attendance: 7,174
- Referee: Walt Davenport

=== Liberty ===
Quarter	1	2	3	4	Total
VMI	0	0	0	7	7
Liberty	0	0	7	10	17

at Williams Stadium (Lynchburg, VA)

- Game time: 3:30 PM
- Game weather: 69 degrees, Winds 8 MPH Northwest
- Game attendance: 18,334
- Referee: Gary Patterson
- TV: MASN, ESPN3

=== Gardner-Webb ===
Quarter	1	2	3	4	Total
Gardner-Webb	3	0	0	6	9
VMI	10	7	10	0	27

at Alumni Memorial Field (Lexington, VA)

- Game time: 1:00 PM
- Game weather: 45-50 degrees, Winds 5-8 MPH
- Game attendance: 4,832
- Referee: Jeff Flanagan
- TV: ESPN3

=== The Citadel ===
Quarter	1	2	3	4	Total
VMI	0	10	0	0	10
The Citadel	0	7	3	21	31

at Johnson Hagood Stadium (Charleston, SC)

- Game time: 1:00 PM
- Game weather: 75 degrees, Winds 10 MPH Northeast
- Game attendance: 12,069
- Referee: Thomas Graham

=== Bucknell ===
Quarter	1	2	3	4	Total
Bucknell	7	0	14	14	35
VMI	7	3	7	6	23

at Alumni Memorial Field (Lexington, VA)

- Game time: 1:30 PM
- Game weather: 53 degrees, Winds 10-20 MPH
- Game attendance: 4,913
- Referee: J. Magallanes
