= 2013 Liberty Flames football team =

American college football season

2013 Liberty Flames football

Big South co-champion
- Conference: Big South Conference
- Record: 8–4 (4–1 Big South)
- Head coach: Turner Gill (2nd season)
- Offensive coordinator: Aaron Stamn (2nd season)
- Offensive scheme: Spread
- Co-defensive coordinators: Robert Wimberly (2nd season); Vantz Singletary (2nd season)
- Base defense: 4–3
- Home stadium: Williams Stadium

2013 Big South Conference football standings
| | Conf. | | | Overall |
| Team | W | | L | W | | L |
|---|---|---|---|---|---|---|
| No. 7 Coastal Carolina +^ | 4 | – | 1 | 12 | – | 3 |
| Liberty + | 4 | – | 1 | 8 | – | 4 |
| No. 24 Charleston Southern | 3 | – | 2 | 10 | – | 3 |
| Gardner–Webb | 2 | – | 3 | 7 | – | 5 |
| Presbyterian | 1 | – | 4 | 3 | – | 8 |
| VMI | 1 | – | 4 | 2 | – | 10 |
+ – Conference co-champions; ^ – FCS playoff participant; Rankings from The Sports Network poll

The 2013 Liberty Flames football team represented Liberty University in the 2013 NCAA Division I FCS football season. They were led by second-year head coach Turner Gill and played their home games at Williams Stadium. They were a member of the Big South Conference. They finished the season 8–4, 4–1 in Big South play to share the Big South Conference title with Coastal Carolina. Due to their loss to Coastal Carolina, they did not receive the conference's automatic bid to the FCS Playoffs and did not receive an at-large bid.

== Schedule ==
| Date | Time | Opponent | Site | TV | Result | Attendance |
|---|---|---|---|---|---|---|
| August 29 | 6:00 pm | at Kent State* | Dix Stadium; Kent, OH | ESPN3 | L 10–17 | 20,790 |
| September 7 | 7:00 pm | Monmouth* | Williams Stadium; Lynchburg, VA | Liberty Channel | W 45–15 | 18,467 |
| September 14 | 7:00 pm | Morgan State* | Williams Stadium; Lynchburg, VA | Liberty Channel | W 38–10 | 15,488 |
| September 21 | 6:00 pm | at No. 23 Richmond* | E. Claiborne Robins Stadium; Richmond, VA | Liberty Channel | L 21–30 | 8,076 |
| September 28 | 7:00 pm | Kentucky Wesleyan* | Williams Stadium; Lynchburg, VA | Liberty Channel | W 73–7 | 15,807 |
| October 5 | 3:00 pm | at Old Dominion* | Foreman Field; Norfolk, VA | Liberty Channel | L 17–21 | 20,118 |
| October 19 | 3:30 pm | No. 6 Coastal Carolina^{†} | Williams Stadium; Lynchburg, VA (rivalry) | ESPN3 | L 52–55 ^{2OT} | 18,911 |
| October 26 | 1:30 pm | at Gardner–Webb | Ernest W. Spangler Stadium; Boiling Springs, NC | ESPN3 | W 24–0 | 6,430 |
| November 2 | 3:30 pm | VMI | Williams Stadium; Lynchburg, VA | Liberty Channel | W 17–7 | 18,334 |
| November 9 | 3:30 pm | Presbyterian | Williams Stadium; Lynchburg, VA | Liberty Channel | W 35–14 | 10,654 |
| November 16 | 3:30 pm | Brevard* | Williams Stadium; Lynchburg, VA | Liberty Channel | W 59–21 | 7,554 |
| November 23 | 1:30 pm | at No. 18 Charleston Southern | Buccaneer Field; Charleston, SC | ESPN3 | W 56–14 | 3,756 |
*Non-conference game; ^{†}Homecoming; Rankings from The Sports Network Poll released prior to the game; All times are in Eastern time

- Source: Schedule

== Game summaries ==
=== @ Kent State ===
Liberty @ Kent State

| Team | 1 | 2 | 3 | 4 | Total |
|---|---|---|---|---|---|
| Flames | 0 | 3 | 7 | 0 | 10 |
| • Golden Flashes | 7 | 0 | 0 | 10 | 17 |

- Date: August 29
- Location: Dix Stadium
  Kent, OH
- Game start: 6:00 PM EDT
- Game attendance: 20,790
- Television network: ESPN3

=== Monmouth ===
Monmouth @ Liberty

| Team | 1 | 2 | 3 | 4 | Total |
|---|---|---|---|---|---|
| Hawks | 6 | 0 | 0 | 9 | 15 |
| • Flames | 9 | 22 | 14 | 0 | 45 |

- Date: September 7
- Location: Williams Stadium
  Lynchburg, VA
- Game start: 7:00 PM EDT
- Game attendance: 18,467
- Television network: LFSN

=== Morgan State ===
Morgan State @ Liberty

| Team | 1 | 2 | 3 | 4 | Total |
|---|---|---|---|---|---|
| Bears | 0 | 3 | 0 | 7 | 10 |
| • Flames | 14 | 14 | 7 | 3 | 38 |

- Date: September 14
- Location: Williams Stadium
  Lynchburg, VA
- Game start: 7:00 PM EDT
- Game attendance: 15,488
- Television network: LFSN

=== @ Richmond ===
Liberty @ Richmond

| Team | 1 | 2 | 3 | 4 | Total |
|---|---|---|---|---|---|
| Flames | 7 | 7 | 7 | 0 | 21 |
| • #23 Spiders | 10 | 13 | 7 | 0 | 30 |

- Date: September 21
- Location: E. Claiborne Robins Stadium
  Richmond, VA
- Game start: 6:00 PM EDT
- Game attendance: 8,076
- Television network: LFSN

=== Kentucky Wesleyan ===
Kentucky Wesleyan @ Liberty

| Team | 1 | 2 | 3 | 4 | Total |
|---|---|---|---|---|---|
| Panthers | 7 | 0 | 0 | 0 | 7 |
| • Flames | 24 | 21 | 14 | 14 | 73 |

- Date: September 28
- Location: Williams Stadium
  Lynchburg, VA
- Game start: 7:00 PM EDT
- Game attendance: 15,807
- Television network: LFSN

=== @ Old Dominion ===
Liberty @ Old Dominion

| Team | 1 | 2 | 3 | 4 | Total |
|---|---|---|---|---|---|
| Flames | 7 | 3 | 7 | 0 | 17 |
| • Monarchs | 7 | 0 | 0 | 14 | 21 |

- Date: October 5
- Location: Foreman Field
  Norfolk, VA
- Game start: 3:00 PM EDT
- Television network: COX

=== Coastal Carolina ===
Coastal Carolina @ Liberty

| Team | 1 | 2 | 3 | 4 | OT | 2OT | Total |
|---|---|---|---|---|---|---|---|
| • #6 Chanticleers | 6 | 10 | 14 | 15 | 7 | 3 | 55 |
| Flames | 14 | 14 | 14 | 3 | 7 | 0 | 52 |

- Date: October 19
- Location: Williams Stadium
  Lynchburg, VA
- Game start: 3:30 PM EDT
- Television network: ESPN3

=== @ Gardner–Webb ===
Liberty @ Gardner–Webb

| Team | 1 | 2 | 3 | 4 | Total |
|---|---|---|---|---|---|
| • Flames | 0 | 14 | 3 | 7 | 24 |
| Runnin' Bulldogs | 0 | 0 | 0 | 0 | 0 |

- Date: October 26
- Location: Ernest W. Spangler Stadium
  Boiling Springs, NC
- Game start: 1:30 PM EDT
- Game attendance: 6,430
- Television network: ESPN3

=== VMI ===
VMI @ Liberty

| Team | 1 | 2 | 3 | 4 | Total |
|---|---|---|---|---|---|
| Keydets | 0 | 0 | 0 | 7 | 7 |
| • Flames | 0 | 0 | 7 | 10 | 17 |

- Date: November 2
- Location: Williams Stadium
  Lynchburg, VA
- Game start: 3:30 PM EDT
- Game attendance: 18,334
- Game weather: 69 °F (21 °C), Wind: NW 8 miles per hour (13 km/h)
- Referee: Gary Patterson
- Television network: LFSN

=== Presbyterian ===
Presbyterian @ Liberty

| Team | 1 | 2 | 3 | 4 | Total |
|---|---|---|---|---|---|
| Blue Hose | 0 | 7 | 7 | 0 | 14 |
| • Flames | 7 | 14 | 7 | 7 | 35 |

- Date: November 9
- Location: Williams Stadium
  Lynchburg, VA
- Game start: 3:30 PM EST
- Television network: LFSN

=== Brevard ===
Brevard @ Liberty

| Team | 1 | 2 | 3 | 4 | Total |
|---|---|---|---|---|---|
| Tornadoes | 0 | 14 | 0 | 7 | 21 |
| • Flames | 14 | 28 | 10 | 7 | 59 |

- Date: November 16
- Location: Williams Stadium
  Lynchburg, VA
- Game start: 3:30 PM EST
- Television network: LFSN

=== @ Charleston Southern ===
Liberty @ Charleston Southern

| Team | 1 | 2 | 3 | 4 | Total |
|---|---|---|---|---|---|
| • Flames | 7 | 14 | 21 | 14 | 56 |
| #18 Buccaneers | 0 | 0 | 7 | 7 | 14 |

- Date: November 23
- Location: Buccaneer Field
  Charleston, SC
- Game start: 1:30 PM EST
- Game attendance: 3,756
- Television network: ESPN3
