= 2013 Presbyterian Blue Hose football team =

American college football season

2013 Presbyterian Blue Hose football
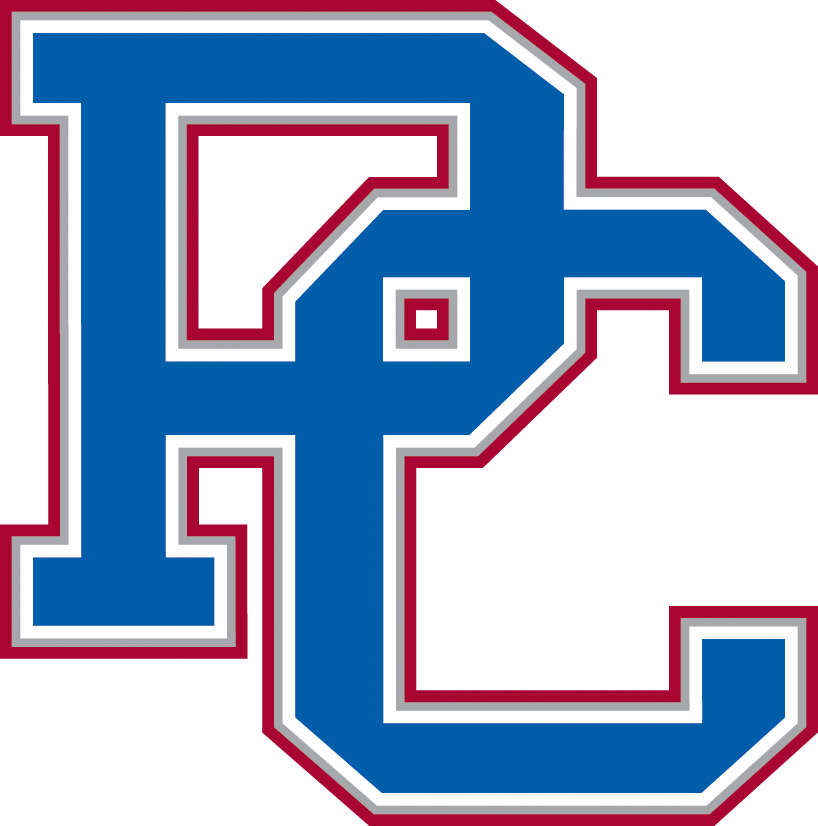
- Conference: Big South Conference
- Record: 3–8 (1–4 Big South)
- Head coach: Harold Nichols (5th season)
- Offensive coordinator: Todd Varn
- Defensive coordinator: Tommy Spangler
- Home stadium: Bailey Memorial Stadium

2013 Big South Conference football standings
	Conf.			Overall
Team	W		L	W		L
No. 7 Coastal Carolina +^	4	–	1	12	–	3
Liberty +	4	–	1	8	–	4
No. 24 Charleston Southern	3	–	2	10	–	3
Gardner–Webb	2	–	3	7	–	5
Presbyterian	1	–	4	3	–	8
VMI	1	–	4	2	–	10
+ – Conference co-champions; ^ – FCS playoff participant; Rankings from The Sports Network poll

The 2013 Presbyterian Blue Hose football team represented Presbyterian College in the 2013 NCAA Division I FCS football season. They were led by fifth-year head coach Harold Nichols and played their home games at Bailey Memorial Stadium. They were a member of the Big South Conference. They finished the season 3–8, 1–4 in Big South play to finish in a tie for fifth place.

== Schedule ==
Date	Time	Opponent	Site	TV	Result	Attendance
August 29	6:30 pm	at Wake Forest*	BB&T Field; Winston-Salem, NC	ESPN3	L 7–31	26,202
September 7	2:00 pm	Brevard*	Bailey Memorial Stadium; Clinton, SC	BSN	W 42–24	4,027
September 14	12:00 pm	at Furman*	Paladin Stadium; Greenville, SC		L 20–21	6,500
September 28	2:00 pm	Charlotte*	Bailey Memorial Stadium; Clinton, SC	ESPN3	L 21–45	5,268
October 5	1:30 pm	at No. 17 Wofford*	Gibbs Stadium; Spartanburg, SC	ESPN3	L 14–55	7,820
October 19	2:00 pm	VMI	Bailey Memorial Stadium; Clinton, SC	BSN	W 49–35	3,032
October 26	2:00 pm	Point*^{†}	Bailey Memorial Stadium; Clinton, SC	BSN	W 49–14	4,689
November 2	2:00 pm	No. 24 Charleston Southern	Bailey Memorial Stadium; Clinton, SC	ESPN3	L 16–27	3,181
November 9	3:30 pm	at Liberty	Williams Stadium; Lynchburg, VA	LFSN	L 14–35	10,654
November 16	1:00 pm	at No. 11 Coastal Carolina	Brooks Stadium; Conway, SC	ESPN3	L 13–46	7,035
November 23	1:00 pm	Gardner–Webb	Bailey Memorial Stadium; Clinton, SC	BSN	L 13–20	3,333
*Non-conference game; ^{†}Homecoming; Rankings from The Sports Network Poll released prior to the game; All times are in Eastern time

- Source: Schedule

== Game summaries ==
=== @ Wake Forest ===
	1	2	3	4	Total
Blue Hose	7	0	0	0	7
Demon Deacons	3	14	7	7	31

=== Brevard ===
	1	2	3	4	Total
Tornadoes	14	7	0	3	24
Blue Hose	7	21	7	7	42

=== @ Furman ===
	1	2	3	4	Total
Blue Hose	7	13	0	0	20
Paladins	7	0	14	0	21

=== Charlotte ===
	1	2	3	4	Total
49ers	7	21	14	3	45
Blue Hose	14	0	0	7	21

=== @ Wofford ===
	1	2	3	4	Total
Blue Hose	0	7	0	7	14
#17 Terriers	7	20	14	14	55

=== VMI ===
	1	2	3	4	Total
Keydets	7	0	7	21	35
Blue Hose	0	14	21	14	49

=== Point ===
	1	2	3	4	Total
Skyhawks	3	0	7	9	19
Blue Hose	21	14	7	7	49

=== Charleston Southern ===
	1	2	3	4	Total
#24 Buccaneers	7	7	10	3	27
Blue Hose	3	0	13	0	16

=== @ Liberty ===
	1	2	3	4	Total
Blue Hose	0	7	0	0	7
Flames	7	14	7	7	35

=== @ Coastal Carolina ===
	1	2	3	4	Total
Blue Hose	0	0	0	13	13
#11 Chanticleers	14	14	7	11	46

=== Gardner–Webb ===
	1	2	3	4	Total
Runnin' Bulldogs					0
Blue Hose					0
