= 2013 Coastal Carolina Chanticleers football team =

American college football season

2013 Coastal Carolina Chanticleers football

Big South co-champion

NCAA Division I Quarterfinal, L 14–48 at North Dakota State
- Conference: Big South Conference

Ranking
- Sports Network: No. 7
- FCS Coaches: No. 7
- Record: 12–3 (4–1 Big South)
- Head coach: Joe Moglia (2nd season)
- Offensive coordinator: Dave Patenaude (2nd season)
- Offensive scheme: Pro spread
- Defensive coordinator: Clayton Carlin (2nd season)
- Base defense: 4–2–5
- Home stadium: Brooks Stadium

2013 Big South Conference football standings
	Conf.			Overall
Team	W		L	W		L
No. 7 Coastal Carolina +^	4	–	1	12	–	3
Liberty +	4	–	1	8	–	4
No. 24 Charleston Southern	3	–	2	10	–	3
Gardner–Webb	2	–	3	7	–	5
Presbyterian	1	–	4	3	–	8
VMI	1	–	4	2	–	10
+ – Conference co-champions; ^ – FCS playoff participant; Rankings from The Sports Network poll

The 2013 Coastal Carolina Chanticleers football team represented Coastal Carolina University as a member of the Big South Conference during the 2013 NCAA Division I FCS football season. Led by second-year head coach Joe Moglia, the Chanticleers compiled an overall record of 12–3 with a mark of 4–1 in conference play, sharing the Big South title with Liberty. Coastal Carolina received the Big South's automatic bid into the NCAA Division I Football Championship playoffs, where the Chanticleers defeated Bethune–Cookman in the first round and Montana in the second round before losing in the quarterfinals to the eventual national champion, North Dakota State. Coastal Carolina played home games at Brooks Stadium in Conway, South Carolina.

== Schedule ==
Date	Time	Opponent	Rank	Site	TV	Result	Attendance
August 31	6:00 pm	at South Carolina State*	No. 25	Oliver C. Dawson Stadium; Orangeburg, SC		W 27–20	10,048
September 7	6:00 pm	Furman*	No. 24	Brooks Stadium; Conway, SC	WMYA	W 35–28	8,636
September 14	6:00 pm	at Eastern Kentucky*	No. 21	Roy Kidd Stadium; Richmond, KY		W 51–32	14,500
September 21	6:00 pm	Hampton*^{†}	No. 15	Brooks Stadium; Conway, SC	BSN	W 50–17	9,386
September 28	1:30 pm	at Elon*	No. 12	Rhodes Stadium; Elon, NC		W 53–28	10,227
October 12	6:00 pm	Gardner–Webb	No. 8	Brooks Stadium; Conway, SC	ESPN3	W 42–7	7,819
October 19	3:30 pm	at Liberty	No. 6	Williams Stadium; Lynchburg, VA (rivalry)	ESPN3	W 55–52 ^{2OT}	18,911
October 26	6:00 pm	VMI	No. 6	Brooks Stadium; Conway, SC	BSN	W 66–27	7,174
November 2	3:00 pm	Charlotte*^{†}	No. 6	Brooks Stadium; Conway, SC	BSN	W 50–25	9,221
November 9	1:00 pm	at No. 18 Charleston Southern	No. 5	Buccaneer Field; Charleston, SC	BSN	L 26–31	6,135
November 16	3:00 pm	Presbyterian	No. 11	Brooks Stadium; Conway, SC	ESPN3	W 46–13	7,035
November 23	1:00 pm	at No. 12 (FBS) South Carolina*	No. 11	Williams-Brice Stadium; Columbia, SC	PPV	L 10–70	81,411
November 30	1:00 pm	No. 12 Bethune-Cookman*	No. 11	Brooks Stadium; Conway, SC (NCAA Division I First Round)	ESPN3	W 48–24	3,007
December 7	2:00 pm	at No. 4 Montana*	No. 11	Washington–Grizzly Stadium; Missoula, MT (NCAA Division I Second Round)	ESPN3	W 42–35	17,345
December 14	12:00 pm	at No. 1 North Dakota State*	No. 11	Fargodome; Fargo, ND (NCAA Division I Quarterfinal)	ESPN	L 14–48	18,219
*Non-conference game; ^{†}Homecoming; Rankings from The Sports Network Poll released prior to the game; All times are in Eastern time

== Ranking movements ==
Ranking movements Legend: ██ Increase in ranking ██ Decrease in ranking
	Week														
Poll	Pre	1	2	3	4	5	6	7	8	9	10	11	12	13	Final
Sports Network	25	24	21	15	12	9	8	6	6	6	5	11	11	11	7
Coaches	21	22	21	15	11	6	6	4	3	3	3	9	7	11	7
