= 2013 Gardner–Webb Runnin' Bulldogs football team =

American college football season

2013 Gardner–Webb Runnin' Bulldogs football
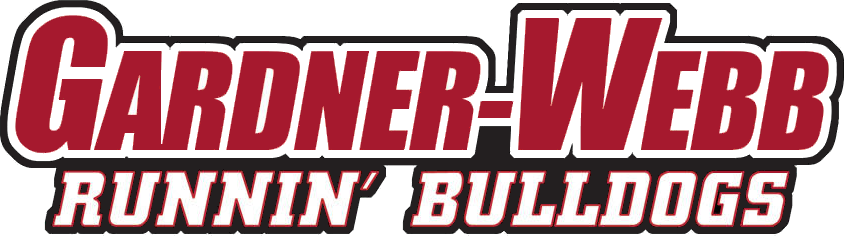
- Conference: Big South Conference
- Record: 7–5 (2–3 Big South)
- Head coach: Carroll McCray (1st season)
- Defensive coordinator: Randall McCray (1st season)
- Home stadium: Ernest W. Spangler Stadium

2013 Big South Conference football standings
	Conf.			Overall
Team	W		L	W		L
No. 7 Coastal Carolina +^	4	–	1	12	–	3
Liberty +	4	–	1	8	–	4
No. 24 Charleston Southern	3	–	2	10	–	3
Gardner–Webb	2	–	3	7	–	5
Presbyterian	1	–	4	3	–	8
VMI	1	–	4	2	–	10
+ – Conference co-champions; ^ – FCS playoff participant; Rankings from The Sports Network poll

The 2013 Gardner–Webb Runnin' Bulldogs football team represented Gardner–Webb University as a member of the Big South Conference during the 2013 NCAA Division I FCS football season. Led by first-year head coach Carroll McCray, the Runnin' Bulldogs compiled an overall record of 7–5 with a mark of 2–3 in conference play, placing fourth in the Big South. Gardner–Webb played home games at Ernest W. Spangler Stadium in Boiling Springs, North Carolina.

== Schedule ==
Date	Time	Opponent	Rank	Site	TV	Result	Attendance
August 31	6:00 pm	Furman*		Ernest W. Spangler Stadium; Boiling Springs, NC	WMYA	W 28–21	3,876
September 7	6:00 pm	at Marshall*		Joan C. Edwards Stadium; Huntington, WV		L 0–55	26,317
September 14	6:30 pm	No. 15 Richmond*		Ernest W. Spangler Stadium; Boiling Springs, NC	ESPN3	W 12–10	5,590
September 21	7:00 pm	at No. 10 Wofford*		Gibbs Stadium; Spartanburg, SC		W 3–0	6,207
September 28	6:00 pm	Point*	No. 25	Ernest W. Spangler Stadium; Boiling Springs, NC	BSN	W 55–7	4,890
October 5	12:00 pm	at Charlotte*	No. 25	Jerry Richardson Stadium; Charlotte, NC	WCCB	L 51–53	12,222
October 12	6:00 pm	at No. 8 Coastal Carolina		Brooks Stadium; Conway, SC	ESPN3	L 7–42	7,819
October 26	1:30 pm	Liberty		Ernest W. Spangler Stadium; Boiling Springs, NC	ESPN3	L 0–24	6,430
November 2	1:30 pm	Warner*		Ernest W. Spangler Stadium; Boiling Springs, NC	BSN	W 51–14	3,150
November 9	1:00 pm	at VMI		Alumni Memorial Field; Lexington, VA	ESPN3	L 9–27	4,832
November 16	1:30 pm	No. 13 Charleston Southern		Ernest W. Spangler Stadium; Boiling Springs, NC	BSN	W 27–10	4,890
November 23	1:00 pm	at Presbyterian		Bailey Memorial Stadium; Clinton, SC	BSN	W 20–13	3,333
*Non-conference game; Rankings from The Sports Network Poll released prior to the game; All times are in Eastern time
