= 2013 Charleston Southern Buccaneers football team =

American college football season

2013 Charleston Southern Buccaneers football
- Conference: Big South Conference

Ranking
- Sports Network: No. 24
- FCS Coaches: No. 22
- Record: 10–3 (3–2 Big South)
- Head coach: Jamey Chadwell (1st season)
- Offensive coordinator: Gabe Giardina (1st season)
- Defensive coordinator: Chad Staggs (1st season)
- Home stadium: Buccaneer Field

2013 Big South Conference football standings
	Conf.			Overall
Team	W		L	W		L
No. 7 Coastal Carolina +^	4	–	1	12	–	3
Liberty +	4	–	1	8	–	4
No. 24 Charleston Southern	3	–	2	10	–	3
Gardner–Webb	2	–	3	7	–	5
Presbyterian	1	–	4	3	–	8
VMI	1	–	4	2	–	10
+ – Conference co-champions; ^ – FCS playoff participant; Rankings from The Sports Network poll

The 2013 Charleston Southern Buccaneers football team represented Charleston Southern University as a member of the Big South Conference during the 2013 NCAA Division I FCS football season. Led by first-year head coach Jamey Chadwell, the Buccaneers compiled an overall record of 10–3 with a mark of 3–2 in conference play, placing third in the Big South. Charleston Southern played home games at Buccaneer Field in Charleston, South Carolina.

== Schedule ==
Date	Time	Opponent	Rank	Site	TV	Result	Attendance
August 31	6:00 pm	at The Citadel*		Johnson Hagood Stadium; Charleston, SC		W 32–29	12,196
September 7	11:00 am	Shorter*		Buccaneer Field; Charleston, SC	BSN	W 23–15	3,812
September 14	6:00 pm	at Campbell*		Barker–Lane Stadium; Buies Creek, NC		W 30–10	6,044
September 21	4:00 pm	at Norfolk State*		William "Dick" Price Stadium; Norfolk, VA		W 20–12	5,963
September 28	3:30 pm	at Appalachian State*		Kidd Brewer Stadium; Boone, NC		W 27–24	29,145
October 5	1:30 pm	North Greenville*		Buccaneer Field; Charleston, SC	BSN	W 28–14	4,523
October 12	1:30 pm	at VMI		Alumni Memorial Field; Lexington, VA	BSN	W 25–17	5,902
October 19	2:00 pm	at Colorado*		Folsom Field; Boulder, CO	P12N	L 10–43	36,730
October 26	1:30 pm	Charlotte*		Buccaneer Field; Charleston, SC	BSN	W 36–14	4,319
November 2	2:00 pm	at Presbyterian	No. 24	Bailey Memorial Stadium; Clinton, SC	ESPN3	W 27–16	3,181
November 9	1:30 pm	No. 5 Coastal Carolina	No. 18	Buccaneer Field; Charleston, SC	BSN	W 31–26	6,135
November 16	1:30 pm	at Gardner–Webb	No. 13	Ernest W. Spangler Stadium; Boiling Springs, NC	BSN	L 10–27	4,890
November 23	1:30 pm	Liberty	No. 18	Buccaneer Field; Charleston, SC	ESPN3	L 14–56	3,756
*Non-conference game; Rankings from The Sports Network Poll released prior to the game; All times are in Eastern time

== Game summaries ==
=== @ The Citadel ===
	1	2	3	4	Total
Buccaneers	0	14	15	3	32
Bulldogs	9	7	6	7	29

=== Shorter ===
	1	2	3	4	Total
Hawks	7	0	0	8	15
Buccaneers	14	9	0	0	23

=== @ Campbell ===
	1	2	3	4	Total
Buccaneers	7	3	7	13	30
Fighting Camels	0	3	0	7	10

=== @ Norfolk State ===
	1	2	3	4	Total
Buccaneers	0	7	7	6	20
Spartans	0	6	0	6	12

=== @ Appalachian State ===
	1	2	3	4	Total
Buccaneers	7	10	3	7	27
Mountaineers	7	10	7	0	24

=== North Greenville ===
	1	2	3	4	Total
Crusaders	7	0	7	0	14
Buccaneers	7	7	7	7	28

=== @ VMI ===
	1	2	3	4	Total
Buccaneers	13	0	9	3	25
Keydets	0	14	3	0	17

=== @ Colorado ===
	1	2	3	4	Total
Buccaneers	0	10	0	0	10
Buffaloes	8	14	7	14	43

Colorado's game vs Fresno State on September 14 was cancelled due to flooding, making Colorado need to add a 12th game. On September 30, Charleston Southern was granted a waiver to play a 13th regular season game to be able to play Colorado.

=== Charlotte ===
	1	2	3	4	Total
49ers	7	0	7	0	14
Buccaneers	0	15	6	15	36

=== @ Presbyterian ===
	1	2	3	4	Total
#24 Buccaneers	7	7	10	3	27
Blue Hose	3	0	13	0	16

=== Coastal Carolina ===
	1	2	3	4	Total
#5 Chanticleers	3	3	7	13	26
#18 Buccaneers	10	14	7	0	31

=== @ Gardner–Webb ===
	1	2	3	4	Total
#13 Buccaneers	0	0	10	0	10
Runnin' Bulldogs	10	10	7	0	27

=== Liberty ===
	1	2	3	4	Total
Flames	7	14	21	14	56
Buccaneers	0	0	7	7	14

== Ranking movements ==
Ranking movements Legend: ██ Increase in ranking ██ Decrease in ranking — = Not ranked RV = Received votes
	Week														
Poll	Pre	1	2	3	4	5	6	7	8	9	10	11	12	13	Final
Sports Network	—	RV	—	—	RV	RV	RV	RV	RV	24	18	13	18	23	24
Coaches	—	RV	—	—	—	RV	25	24	24	18	16	12	16	20	22
