= 2013 Charlotte 49ers football team =

American college football season

2013 Charlotte 49ers football
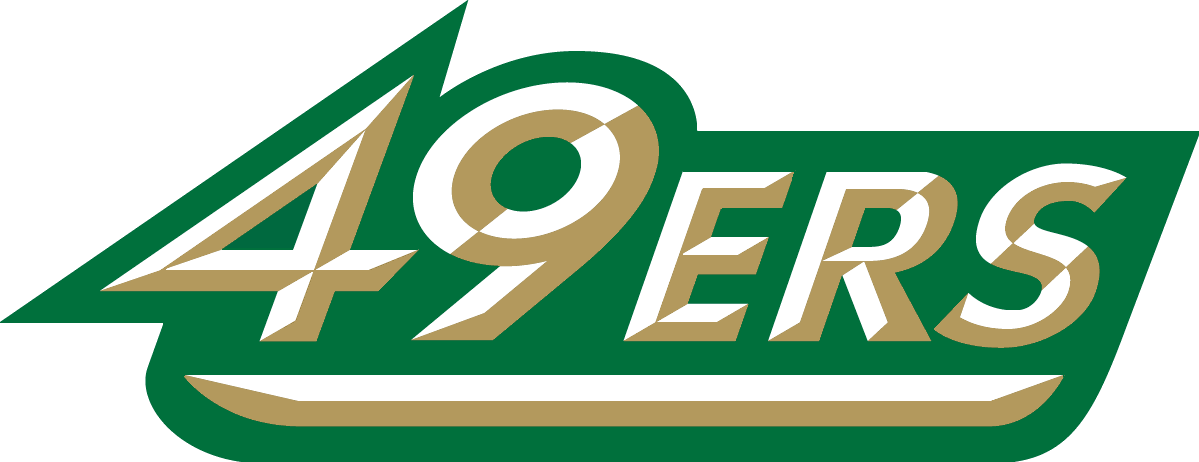
- Conference: Independent
- Record: 5–6
- Head coach: Brad Lambert (1st season)
- Offensive coordinator: Jeff Mullen (1st season)
- Offensive scheme: Spread
- Defensive coordinator: Bruce Tall (1st season)
- Base defense: 3–4
- Home stadium: Jerry Richardson Stadium

2013 NCAA Division I FCS independents football standings
| | Conf. | | | Overall |
| Team | W | | L | W | | L |
|---|---|---|---|---|---|---|
| Old Dominion | | – | | 8 | – | 4 |
| Abilene Christian | | – | | 6 | – | 5 |
| Incarnate Word | | – | | 6 | – | 5 |
| Monmouth | | – | | 6 | – | 6 |
| Charlotte | | – | | 5 | – | 6 |
| Houston Baptist | | – | | 3 | – | 4 |
Abilene Christian and Incarnate Word ineligible for FCS playoffs as part of reclassification from Division II; Charlotte and Old Dominion ineligible for FCS playoffs as part of FBS transition; Houston Baptist ineligible for FCS playoffs due to playing only a partial exhibition schedule

The 2013 Charlotte 49ers football team represented the University of North Carolina at Charlotte (also called Charlotte or UNC Charlotte) in the 2013 NCAA Division I FCS football season. 2013 was the inaugural season for 49ers football and they were classified as an FCS independent school, meaning they had no athletic conference affiliation for the 2013 season. The team was led by first time head coach Brad Lambert and played its home games on campus at the newly built Jerry Richardson Stadium in Charlotte, North Carolina. As the team was in their two-year transition period before reclassifying to the NCAA Division I Football Bowl Subdivision (FBS), they were ineligible to participate in the FCS playoffs.

== Personnel ==
=== Coaching staff ===
| Name | Position | Seasons at Charlotte | Alma mater |
| Brad Lambert | Head coach | 1 | Kansas State (1987) |
| Jeff Mullen | Offensive coordinator | 1 | Wittenberg (1990) |
| Bruce Tall | Defensive coordinator | 1 | Ohio Wesleyan (1982) |
| Phil Ratliff | Offensive line/Recruiting coordinator | 1 | Marshall (1994) |
| James Adams | Secondary | 1 | Wake Forest (2006) |
| Drew Dayton | Inside linebackers | 1 | Wake Forest (2003) |
| Damien Gary | Running backs | 1 | Georgia (2005) |
| Johnson Richardson | Tight ends | 1 | Wofford (2010) |
| John Russell, Jr. | Secondary | 1 | Wake Forest (2010) |
| Napoleon Sykes | Outside linebackers | 1 | Wake Forest (2006) |
| Joe Tereshinski III | Wide receivers | 1 | Georgia (2006) |

== Recruiting ==
=== Recruiting classes ===
Charlotte's first recruiting class was signed in 2012. The entire first recruiting class was red-shirted, as the 49ers would not play until the 2013 season.

College recruiting (2012)
| Name | Hometown | School | Height | Weight | 40^{‡} | Commit date |
|---|---|---|---|---|---|---|
| Brandon Banks; DE | High Point, NC | Southwaest Guilford | 6 ft 3 in (1.91 m) | 230 lb (100 kg) | 4.7 | Dec 12, 2011 |
| Brandon Banks; DE | Recruit ratings: Rivals: | | | | | |
| Alan Barnwell; RB | Burlington, NC | Cummings | 5 ft 10 in (1.78 m) | 175 lb (79 kg) | - | May 16, 2012 |
| Alan Barnwell; RB | Recruit ratings: No ratings found | | | | | |
| Jarred Barr; OL | Monroe, NC | Sun Valley | 6 ft 3 in (1.91 m) | 270 lb (120 kg) | - | Jan 30, 2012 |
| Jarred Barr; OL | Recruit ratings: Rivals: | | | | | |
| Justin Bolus; Athlete | James Island, SC | James Island School | 6 ft 3 in (1.91 m) | 205 lb (93 kg) | - | Dec 7, 2201 |
| Justin Bolus; Athlete | Recruit ratings: Rivals: | | | | | |
| Terry Caldwell; LB | Wilmington, NC | Hoggard | 6 ft 0 in (1.83 m) | 200 lb (91 kg) | - | Dec 12, 2011 |
| Terry Caldwell; LB | Recruit ratings: Rivals: | | | | | |
| Jaquil Capel; Athlete | Mount Gilead, NC | West Montgomery | 5 ft 11 in (1.80 m) | 180 lb (82 kg) | - | Feb 1, 2012 |
| Jaquil Capel; Athlete | Recruit ratings: Rivals: | | | | | |
| Jamal Covington; OL | Hampton, GA | Lovejoy | 6 ft 4 in (1.93 m) | 270 lb (120 kg) | - | Jan 15, 2012 |
| Jamal Covington; OL | Recruit ratings: Rivals: | | | | | |
| Greg Cunningham; DB | Charlotte, NC | West Charlotte | 6 ft 1 in (1.85 m) | 177 lb (80 kg) | - | May 16, 2012 |
| Greg Cunningham; DB | Recruit ratings: No ratings found | | | | | |
| Austin Duke; WR | Charlotte, NC | Independence | 5 ft 8 in (1.73 m) | 155 lb (70 kg) | - | Jan 30, 2012 |
| Austin Duke; WR | Recruit ratings: Rivals: | | | | | |
| Jalen Holt; Athlete | Norwood, NC | South Stanly | 6 ft 3 in (1.91 m) | 220 lb (100 kg) | 4.6 | Jan 12, 2012 |
| Jalen Holt; Athlete | Recruit ratings: Rivals: | | | | | |
| Matt Johnson; QB | Maiden, NC | Maiden | 6 ft 3 in (1.91 m) | 210 lb (95 kg) | 4.7 | Oct 6, 2011 |
| Matt Johnson; QB | Recruit ratings: Rivals: | | | | | |
| Thomas LaBianca; OL | Indian Trail, NC | Porter Ridge | 6 ft 3 in (1.91 m) | 282 lb (128 kg) | - | Dec 24, 2011 |
| Thomas LaBianca; OL | Recruit ratings: Rivals: | | | | | |
| Rick Legrant; LB | Buford, GA | Buford | 6 ft 0 in (1.83 m) | 205 lb (93 kg) | - | Nov 28, 2011 |
| Rick Legrant; LB | Recruit ratings: Rivals: | | | | | |
| James Middleton; DE | St. Stephen, SC | Timberland | 6 ft 4 in (1.93 m) | 240 lb (110 kg) | 4.8 | Feb 1, 2012 |
| James Middleton; DE | Recruit ratings: Rivals: | | | | | |
| Karsten Miller; QB | Lexington, NC | North Davidson | 6 ft 3 in (1.91 m) | 195 lb (88 kg) | - | Nov 9, 2011 |
| Karsten Miller; QB | Recruit ratings: Rivals: | | | | | |
| Tank Norman; DB | Richlands, NC | North Davidson | 5 ft 11 in (1.80 m) | 180 lb (82 kg) | - | Dec 12, 2011 |
| Tank Norman; DB | Recruit ratings: Rivals: | | | | | |
| Larry Ogunjobi; DT | Greensboro, NC | Ragsdale | 6 ft 2 in (1.88 m) | 267 lb (121 kg) | - | Dec 12, 2011 |
| Larry Ogunjobi; DT | Recruit ratings: Rivals: | | | | | |
| Casey Perry; OL | Durham, NC | Hillsdale | 6 ft 3 in (1.91 m) | 295 lb (134 kg) | - | Jan 21, 2012 |
| Casey Perry; OL | Recruit ratings: Rivals: | | | | | |
| Mark Pettit; LB | Greensboro, NC | Western Guilford | 6 ft 6 in (1.98 m) | 235 lb (107 kg) | - | Dec 12, 2011 |
| Mark Pettit; LB | Recruit ratings: Rivals: | | | | | |
| Mason Sledge; OL | Monroe, NC | Monroe | 6 ft 4 in (1.93 m) | 250 lb (110 kg) | - | Nov 29, 2011 |
| Mason Sledge; OL | Recruit ratings: Rivals: | | | | | |
| Will Thomas; Athlete | Hampstead, NC | Topsail Senior | 6 ft 0 in (1.83 m) | 165 lb (75 kg) | 4.6 | Dec 29, 2011 |
| Will Thomas; Athlete | Recruit ratings: Rivals: | | | | | |
Overall recruit ranking:
Note: In many cases, Scout, Rivals, 247Sports, On3, and ESPN may conflict in their listings of height and weight.; In these cases, the average was taken. ESPN grades are on a 100-point scale.; Sources: "2012 Team Ranking". Rivals.com.

The following recruits signed their letters of intent with the Charlotte 49ers football program for the 2013 recruiting year.

College recruiting (2013)
| Name | Hometown | School | Height | Weight | 40^{‡} | Commit date |
|---|---|---|---|---|---|---|
| Trent Bostick; WR | Rockingham, NC | Richmond County | 6 ft 1 in (1.85 m) | 193 lb (88 kg) | - | Dec 28, 2012 |
| Trent Bostick; WR | Recruit ratings: Rivals: | | | | | |
| Blake Brewer; K | Concord, NC | Cannon School | 6 ft 1 in (1.85 m) | 190 lb (86 kg) | - | Dec 10, 2012 |
| Blake Brewer; K | Recruit ratings: Rivals: | | | | | |
| Justin Bridges-Thompson; DB | Spartanburg, SC | Spartanburg | 6 ft 2 in (1.88 m) | 195 lb (88 kg) | 4.8 | Sep 10, 2012 |
| Justin Bridges-Thompson; DB | Recruit ratings: Scout: Rivals: 247Sports: | | | | | |
| Nick Carroll; DT | Raleigh, NC | Cardinal Gibbons | 6 ft 4 in (1.93 m) | 236 lb (107 kg) | 5.3 | Feb 5, 2013 |
| Nick Carroll; DT | Recruit ratings: Rivals: | | | | | |
| Caleb Clayton-Mobly; LB | Milledgeville, GA | Georgia Military College | 6 ft 3 in (1.91 m) | 230 lb (100 kg) | 4.8 | Dec 10, 2012 |
| Caleb Clayton-Mobly; LB | Recruit ratings: Rivals: | | | | | |
| Nolan Corpening; DB | Charlotte, NC | Zebulon B. Vance | 5 ft 10 in (1.78 m) | 170 lb (77 kg) | 4.5 | Jan 13, 2013 |
| Nolan Corpening; DB | Recruit ratings: Rivals: | | | | | |
| Dustin Crouser; LB | Charleston, WV | George Washington School | 6 ft 2 in (1.88 m) | 220 lb (100 kg) | - | Aug 27, 2012 |
| Dustin Crouser; LB | Recruit ratings: Rivals: | | | | | |
| Chris Duffy; Athlete | Indian Trail, NC | Porter Ridge | 5 ft 11 in (1.80 m) | 190 lb (86 kg) | - | Sep 5, 2012 |
| Chris Duffy; Athlete | Recruit ratings: Rivals: 247Sports: | | | | | |
| Eugene German; OL | Martinsburg, WV | Martinsburg | 6 ft 5 in (1.96 m) | 250 lb (110 kg) | 5.3 | Jul 21, 2013 |
| Eugene German; OL | Recruit ratings: Rivals: | | | | | |
| Nicholas Halmon; DB | Bamberg, SC | Bamberg-Ehrhardt | 6 ft 0 in (1.83 m) | 180 lb (82 kg) | 4.6 | Aug 7, 2013 |
| Nicholas Halmon; DB | Recruit ratings: Scout: Rivals: | | | | | |
| Devon Johnson; DE | Milledgeville, GA | Georgia Military College | 6 ft 3 in (1.91 m) | 265 lb (120 kg) | - | Feb 5, 2013 |
| Devon Johnson; DE | Recruit ratings: No ratings found | | | | | |
| Tevin Lawshe; OL | Charlotte, NC | Mallard Creek | 6 ft 4 in (1.93 m) | 275 lb (125 kg) | 5.3 | Aug 20, 2013 |
| Tevin Lawshe; OL | Recruit ratings: Rivals: | | | | | |
| Devin Pearson; DE | Rock Hill, SC | South Pointe | 5 ft 11 in (1.80 m) | 185 lb (84 kg) | - | Dec 10, 2012 |
| Devin Pearson; DE | Recruit ratings: Rivals: | | | | | |
| Kalif Phillips; RB | Kannapolis, NC | AL Brown | 5 ft 10 in (1.78 m) | 185 lb (84 kg) | - | Dec 6, 2012 |
| Kalif Phillips; RB | Recruit ratings: Rivals: | | | | | |
| Jordan Starnes; LB | Norwood, NC | South Stanly | 6 ft 3 in (1.91 m) | 224 lb (102 kg) | 4.8 | Dec 6, 2012 |
| Jordan Starnes; LB | Recruit ratings: Rivals: | | | | | |
| Jachin Watkins; RB | New Bern, NC | New Burn | 6 ft 0 in (1.83 m) | 215 lb (98 kg) | 4.7 | Jun 26, 2012 |
| Jachin Watkins; RB | Recruit ratings: Scout: Rivals: | | | | | |
| James Williams; DB | Huntington Beach, CA | Golden West CC | 6 ft 0 in (1.83 m) | 175 lb (79 kg) | - | Dec 10, 2012 |
| James Williams; DB | Recruit ratings: No ratings found | | | | | |
| Jamar Winston; DE | Irmo, SC | Dutch Folk | 6 ft 8 in (2.03 m) | 240 lb (110 kg) | 4.9 | Aug 21, 2012 |
| Jamar Winston; DE | Recruit ratings: Rivals: | | | | | |
| Wolfgang Zacherl; DT | Raleigh, NC | Broughton | 6 ft 4 in (1.93 m) | 272 lb (123 kg) | 5.4 | Jan 23, 2013 |
| Wolfgang Zacherl; DT | Recruit ratings: Rivals: | | | | | |
Overall recruit ranking:
Note: In many cases, Scout, Rivals, 247Sports, On3, and ESPN may conflict in their listings of height and weight.; In these cases, the average was taken. ESPN grades are on a 100-point scale.; Sources: "2013 Team Ranking". Rivals.com.

== Players ==
=== Player notes ===
Starting redshirt freshman quarterback Matt Johnson of Maiden, North Carolina was named to the Jerry Rice Award Watch List.

=== Player gameday honors ===
| Wearing jersey #49 | Position | Game | Jersey name | Game captains | Flag carriers |
| Larry Ogunjobi | NT | Campbell | Grit | Daniel Blitch, Desmond Cooper, Mikel Hunter, Martay Mattox | Brandon Banks, Jamal Covington, Thomas La Bianca |
| Caleb Clayton-Molby | LB | Chowan | Leadership | Danny Book, Micah Bryan, C.J. Crawford, Mark Hogan | Alan Barnwell, Blake Brewer, James Middleton |
| Mikel Hunter | WR | NC Central | Determination | Matt Johnson, C.J. Crawford, Brandon Banks, Micah Bryan | Mason Sledge, Terry Caldwell, Trent Bostick |
| Danny Book | RT | James Madison | Opportunity | Daniel Blitch, C.J. Crawford, Nico Alcalde, Mark Hogan | Kalif Phillips, Devin Pearson, Brandon Banks |
| Devon Johnson | DE | Presbyterian | Determination | Jamal Covington, C.J. Crawford, Mark Hogan, Martay Mattox | Kalif Phillips, Keaston Sinicki, Daquan Lucas |
| Thomas La Bianca | C | Gardner-Webb | Grit | C.J. Crawford, Mikel Hunter, Mark Hogan, Devon Johnson | Justin Bolus, Caleb Clayton-Molby, Cortezz Nixon |
| Alan Barnwell | RB | UNC Pembroke | Determination | Mikel Hunter, C.J. Crawford, Caleb Clayton-Molby, Mark Hogan | Daniel Blitch, Desmond Cooper, Brandon Strupp |
| Keaston Sinicki | LS | Charleston Southern | Determination | Brandon Banks, Jamal Covington, Matt Johnson, Brandon Strupp | Justin Bolus, James Middleton, Lee McNeill |
| Nico Alcalde | LB | Coastal Carolina | Determination | Desmond Cooper, Caleb Clayton-Molby, C.J. Crawford, Jamal Covington | Larry Ogunjobi, Austin Duke, Demarrell Alexander |
| Mark Hogan | LB | Wesley | Leadership | C.J. Crawford, Mark Hogan, Mikel Hunter, Zeb Little, Alex Petzke, Brandon Strupp | Caleb Clayton-Mobly, Kalif Phillips, Keaston Sinicki |
| Casey Perry | OT | Morehead State | Leadership | C.J. Crawford, Mikel Hunter, Mark Hogan, Caleb Clayton-Molby | Jamal Covington, Mark Pettit, Lee McNeill |

=== Roster ===
2013 Charlotte 49ers football team roster
Players
Coaches
Offense

| Pos. | # | Name | Class |
|---|---|---|---|
| WR | 2 | Will Thomas | RFr |
| WR | 4 | Corey Nesmith Jr. | RFr |
| QB | 5 | Lee McNeill | RFr |
| QB | 8 | Matt Johnson | RFr |
| WR | 9 | Jamel Ross (injured) | RFr |
| WR | 10 | Austin Duke | RFr |
| H-Back | 12 | C.J. Crawford | RSr |
| H-Back | 15 | Justin Bolus | RFr |
| QB | 16 | Danny Karrs | Fr |
| H-Back | 17 | Joc Watkins | Fr |
| WR | 18 | Mikel Hunter | RSr |
| QB | 19 | Patrick O'Brien | RSo |
| RB | 22 | Donjore Gainey | RFr |
| RB | 24 | Alan Barnwell | RFr |
| RB | 25 | Kalif Phillips | Fr |
| RB | 30 | Quintin Gay | RJr |
| RB | 32 | Damarrell Alexander | RSo |
| WR | 35 | Steve Hodgson | Fr |
| H-Back | 47 | Mark Montini | RJr |
| G | 50 | Jarred Barr | RFr |
| OL | 53 | Eric Herkley | So |
| C | 55 | Mason Sledge | RFr |
| C | 60 | Cody Brown | RFr |
| OL | 61 | Zach Thomas | RSo |
| OL | 63 | Cameron Curlings | RFr |
| OL | 64 | Thomas Frazier | RSo |
| OL | 66 | Joe Wolljung | RFr |
| OL | 67 | Mitch Monska | RFr |
| OL | 68 | Daniel Book | RSo |
| OT | 70 | Casey Perry | RFr |
| OL | 71 | Zach Bumgarner | RFr |
| G | 72 | Tevin Lawshe | Fr |
| OT | 73 | Jamal Covington | RFr |
| G | 74 | Thomas LaBianca | RFr |
| OT | 75 | Eugene German | Fr |
| OT | 76 | Daniel Blitch | RJr |
| OT | 77 | Wolfgang Zacherl | Fr |
| OT | 78 | Kyle Hoffman | RFr |
| OT | 79 | Jeff Walker | Fr |
| WR | 80 | Reggie Woods | Fr |
| WR | 81 | Trent Bostick | Fr |
| H-Back | 82 | Jason Eury | RFr |
| WR | 83 | Emmitt Afam | Fr |
| WR | 84 | Darris Smalls | RFr |
| WR | 85 | Luke Sonricker | RJr |
| WR | 86 | Zach Ferguson | RFr |
| WR | 87 | E.J. Rhinehart | RFr |
| WR | 88 | Demarjai Devine | Jr |
| H-Back | 89 | Elijah Roberson | RFr |
| H-Back | 90 | Peter Fields | RSo |

Defense

| Pos. | # | Name | Class |
|---|---|---|---|
| SS | 3 | Kariym Gent | RFr |
| LB | 6 | Terry Caldwell | RFr |
| LB | 7 | Jalen Holt | RFr |
| LB | 9 | Mark Hogan | RSr |
| LB | 11 | Mark Pettit | RFr |
| FS | 13 | Desmond Cooper | RJr |
| DE | 14 | Tank Norman | RFr |
| SS | 20 | Martay Mattox | Jr |
| FS | 21 | Prince Mayela | RFr |
| FS | 23 | Daquan Lucas | RFr |
| CB | 26 | Cortezz Nixon | RSo |
| CB | 27 | Terrance Winchester | RFr |
| DE | 28 | Greg Cunningham Jr. | RFr |
| LB | 29 | Micah Bryan | RJr |
| SS | 31 | Alex Petzke | RSr |
| LB | 34 | Nico Alcalde | RFr |
| SS | 36 | Nick Halmon | Fr |
| FS | 37 | Sam Dexter | RFr |
| LB | 38 | Zeb Little | RSr |
| CB | 40 | Ardy Holmes | RSo |
| FS | 41 | Jordan Abrams | RFr |
| LB | 42 | Caleb Clayton-Mobly | Jr |
| LB | 43 | Tyler DeStefani | RJr |
| LB | 44 | Kendal Parker | RFr |
| CB | 45 | Devin Pearson | Fr |
| LB | 46 | DaQuavius Reid | RFr |
| DE | 50 | Karrington King | Fr |
| LB | 51 | Robert Williams | RSo |
| LB | 52 | Brandon Rodriguez | RFr |
| LB | 54 | Jordan Starnes | Fr |
| DE | 56 | Fletcher O'Neil (injured) | RSo |
| LB | 57 | Justin Bridges-Thompson | Fr |
| LB | 58 | Dustin Crouser | Fr |
| DE | 59 | Payton Thomson | RFr |
| NT | 65 | Larry Ogunjobi | RFr |
| DE | 91 | Nick Carroll | Fr |
| DE | 92 | James Middleton | RFr |
| NT | 93 | Hayden Beck | RFr |
| DE | 94 | Kyle Taylor | RFr |
| DE | 95 | Devin Clegg | RFr |
| DE | 96 | Devon Johnson (injured) | Jr |
| NT | 97 | Tanner Flemming | RFr |
| DE | 98 | Josh Tann (injured) | RSo |
| DE | 99 | Brandon Banks | RFr |

Special teams

| Pos. | # | Name | Class |
|---|---|---|---|
| P | 33 | Brandon Strupp | RSr |
| LS | 48 | Keaston Sinicki | Fr |
| K | 62 | Hayden Pezzoni | RFr |
| K | 69 | Stephen Muscarello | RFr |
| K | 86 | Blake Brewer | Fr |
| P | 97 | Garrett Stuart | RFr |

Head coach

- Brad Lambert (Kansas State)

Coordinators/assistant coaches

- Jeff Mullen (Wittenberg)
  Offensive coordinator/quarterbacks
- Bruce Tall (Ohio Wesleyan)
  Defensive coordinator
- Phil Ratliff (Marshall)
  Recruiting coordinator/offensive line
- Damien Gary (Georgia)
  Running backs
- Johnson Richardson (Wofford)
  Tight ends
- Joe Tereshinski III (Georgia)
  Wide receivers
- James Adams (Wake Forest)
  Secondary
- Drew Dayton (Wake Forest)
  Inside linebackers
- John Russell, Jr. (Wake Forest)
  Secondary
- Napoleon Sykes (Wake Forest)
  Outside linebackers

Legend

- (C) Team captain
- (S) Suspended
- (I) Ineligible
- Injured
- Redshirt

Roster
Last update: April 12, 2015

=== Depth chart ===
Defense

FS
Desmond Cooper
Alex Petzke
⋅

| WLB | ILB | ILB | SLB |
|---|---|---|---|
| Nico Alcalde | Daquan Lucas | Caleb Clayton-Mobly | Mark Hogan |
| Tyler DeStefani | Terry Caldwell | Justin Bridges-Thompson | Jalen Holt |
| ⋅ | Kendal Parker | Micah Bryan | ⋅ |

SS
Martay Mattox
Ardy Holmes
⋅

CB
Terrance Winchester
Greg Cunningham Jr.
⋅

| DE | NT | DE |
|---|---|---|
| James Middleton | Larry Ogunjobi | Brandon Banks |
| Mark Pettit | Tanner Fleming | Devin Clegg |
| Devon Johnson | ⋅ | ⋅ |

CB
Tank Norman
Devin Pearson
Cortezz Nixon

Offense

WR
Trent Bostick
E.J. Rheinhart
Dmarjai Devine

WR
Austin Duke
Corey Nesmith Jr.
⋅

| LT | LG | C | RG | RT |
|---|---|---|---|---|
| Jamal Covington | Mason Sledge | Thomas LaBianca | Daniel Blitch | Daniel Book |
| Eugene German | Casey Perry | Jarred Barr | Zach Thomas | Wolfgang Zacherl |
| ⋅ | ⋅ | Mason Sledge | Mason Sledge | ⋅ |

WR
Justin Bolus
C.J. Crawford
⋅

WR
Mikel Hunter
Will Thomas
⋅

QB
Matt Johnson
Lee McNeill
Patrick O'Brien

RB
Alan Barnwell
Kalif Phillips
⋅

Special teams
PK Blake Brewer
PK Stephen Muscarello
P Brandon Strupp
KR Martay Mattox
PR Mikel Hunter
LS Keaston Sinicki
H Patrick O'Brien

== Schedule ==
| Date | Time | Opponent | Site | TV | Result | Attendance |
|---|---|---|---|---|---|---|
| August 31 | 12:00 pm | Campbell | Jerry Richardson Stadium; Charlotte, NC | WCCB | W 52–7 | 16,630^{A} |
| September 7 | 12:00 pm | Chowan | Jerry Richardson Stadium; Charlotte, NC | WCCB | W 47–7 | 16,598 |
| September 14 | 12:00 pm | North Carolina Central | Jerry Richardson Stadium; Charlotte, NC | WCCB | L 13–40 | 16,630^{A} |
| September 21 | 6:00 pm | at No. 15 James Madison | Bridgeforth Stadium; Harrisonburg, VA | | L 7–34 | 18,302 |
| September 28 | 2:00 pm | at Presbyterian | Bailey Memorial Stadium; Clinton, SC | ESPN3 | W 45–21 | 5,268 |
| October 5 | 12:00 pm | No. 25 Gardner–Webb | Jerry Richardson Stadium; Charlotte, NC | WCCB | W 53–51 | 12,222 |
| October 12 | 12:00 pm | No. 13 (D2) UNC Pembroke^{†} | Jerry Richardson Stadium; Charlotte, NC | WCCB | L 22–45 | 16,630^{A} |
| October 26 | 1:30 pm | at No. 24 Charleston Southern | Buccaneer Field; North Charleston, SC | | L 14–36 | 4,319 |
| November 2 | 3:00 pm | at No. 3 Coastal Carolina | Brooks Stadium; Conway, SC | WCCB, WFXB, WOLO | L 25–50 | 9,221 |
| November 9 | 12:00 pm | No. 20 (D3) Wesley | Jerry Richardson Stadium; Charlotte, NC | WCCB | L 28–35 | 14,534 |
| November 23 | 1:00 pm | at Morehead State | Jayne Stadium; Morehead, KY | | W 61–17 | 1,443 |
^{†}Homecoming; Rankings from Coaches' Poll released prior to the game; All times are in Eastern time

- ^ADenotes the then largest crowd in Jerry Richardson Stadium history.

== Television ==
Local TV coverage was provided on WCCB with Sam Smith calling play-by-play. Former Carolina Panther Quarterback Brett Basanez and Jeff Zell with color commentary; and Brandon Davidow from the sideline.

== Radio ==
Radio coverage for all games was broadcast by IMG College through the Charlotte 49ers Radio Network flagship station WZGV ESPN 730. The radio announcers were Matt Swierad with play-by-play, former Carolina Panther Kevin Donnalley with color commentary, and Bobby Rosinski with sideline reports.

== Game summaries ==
=== Campbell Fighting Camels ===
Campbell vs. Charlotte

| Team | 1 | 2 | 3 | 4 | Total |
|---|---|---|---|---|---|
| Camels | 0 | 7 | 0 | 0 | 7 |
| • 49ers | 22 | 13 | 10 | 7 | 52 |

- Date: August 31
- Location: Jerry Richardson Stadium
  Charlotte, NC
- Game start: 12:08 pm EDT
- Elapsed time: 3:06
- Game attendance: 16,630
- Game weather: 85 °F (29 °C), scattered clouds, no wind
- Referee: Steve Marlowe
- TV announcers (WCCB): Ryan Rose, Kenny Moore, Brandon Davidow, Jon Wilson

Scoring summary
| 1 | 14:14 | CHAR | Mark HOGAN 32 yd interception return (Blake BREWER kick) | CHAR 7–0 |
| 1 | 08:47 | CHAR | Justin BOLUS 1 yd pass from Matt JOHNSON (C.J. CRAWFORD rush) | CHAR 15–0 |
| 1 | 00:55 | CHAR | Austin DUKE 19 yd pass from Matt JOHNSON (Blake BREWER kick) | CHAR 22–0 |
| 2 | 14:49 | CHAR | Blake BREWER 35 yd field goal | CHAR 25–0 |
| 2 | 09:32 | CHAR | Kalif PHILLIPS 15 yd run (Blake BREWER kick) | CHAR 32–0 |
| 2 | 02:08 | CAMP | Dakota WOLF 1 yd run (Alex BIBY kick) | CHAR 32–7 |
| 2 | 00:00 | CHAR | Blake BREWER 20 yd field goal | CHAR 35–7 |
| 3 | 13:35 | CHAR | Blake BREWER 40 yd field goal | CHAR 38–7 |
| 3 | 11:36 | CHAR | Trent BOSTICK 47 yd pass from Matt JOHNSON (Blake BREWER kick) | CHAR 45–7 |
| 4 | 14:35 | CHAR | Corey NESMITH JR 33 yd run (Blake BREWER kick) | CHAR 52–7 |

To open their inaugural season, Charlotte faced the Campbell Fighting Camels. Charlotte dominated the game, winning 52–7.

Charlotte opened the scoring in the first quarter when Mark Hogan returned an interception 32 yards for a touchdown, marking the first points in Charlotte 49ers football's history. Justin Bolus scored the 49ers' first offensive touchdown on a 1-yard pass from Matt Johnson. That was followed by the 49ers' first two-point conversion on a rush by C. J. Crawford. Austin Duke caught another touchdown pass from Matt Johnson followed by the first of Blake Brewer's four successful point-after attempts that day, to close out the first quarter.

Brewer opened the second quarter scoring on the 49ers' first three-point kick from 35 yards out. Kalif Phillips added to the 49ers' point total with a 15-yard touchdown run. Campbell scored their only points of the day on a 1-yard touchdown run by Dakota Wolf, and a successful point-after kick by Alex Biby. Charlotte ended the first half by scoring on a 20-yard Blake Brewer kick with no time left on the clock. Charlotte led Campbell at the half, 35–7.

Charlotte received the ball to open the second half and concluded the opening drive on Blake Brewer's third and final three-point conversion of the day, a successful 40-yard field goal. Trent Bostick closed the third-quarter scoring with a 47-yard passing touchdown from Matt Johnson.

The fourth quarter featured only one scoring drive, as Corey Nesmith Jr. ran in a 33-yard touchdown.

Top performers for the game included Charlotte quarterback Matt Johnson, who passed for 282 yards and 3 touchdowns. Charlotte running back Kalif Phillips had 9 carries for 66 yards and a touchdown. Charlotte receiver Trent Bostick had 4 receptions for 83 yards and a touchdown.

Game notes:

- First game in program history
- First game in the newly opened Jerry Richardson Stadium
- First game against an FCS opponent
- First win in program history

=== (DII) Chowan Hawks ===
Chowan vs. Charlotte

| Team | 1 | 2 | 3 | 4 | Total |
|---|---|---|---|---|---|
| Hawks | 0 | 7 | 0 | 0 | 7 |
| • 49ers | 19 | 7 | 14 | 7 | 47 |

- Date: September 7
- Location: Jerry Richardson Stadium
  Charlotte, NC
- Game start: 12:08 pm EDT
- Elapsed time: 2:48
- Game attendance: 16,598
- Game weather: 79 °F (26 °C), Partly Clouds, 1 mph (1.6 km/h)
- Referee: Ted Pitts
- TV announcers (WCCB): Ryan Rose, Kenny Moore, Brandon Davidow, Jon Wilson

Scoring summary
| 1 | 12:20 | CHAR | Austin Duke 10 yd pass from Matt JOHNSON (Blake BREWER kick) | CHAR 7–0 |
| 1 | 04:52 | CHAR | TEAM safety | CHAR 9–0 |
| 1 | 02:37 | CHAR | Blake BREWER 27 yd field goal | CHAR 12–0 |
| 1 | 02:08 | CHAR | Kalif PHILLIPS 40 yd pass from Matt JOHNSON (Blake BREWER kick) | CHAR 19–0 |
| 2 | 09:13 | CHOW | Antjuan RANDALL 35 yd pass from Cameron STOVER (Alex NOBOA kick) | CHAR 19–7 |
| 2 | 08:58 | CHAR | Mikel HUNTER 96 yd kickoff return (Blake BREWER kick) | CHAR 26–7 |
| 3 | 05:19 | CHAR | Trent BOSTICK 30 yd pass from Matt JOHNSON (Blake BREWER kick) | CHAR 33–7 |
| 3 | 03:57 | CHAR | Austin DUKE 7 yd pass from Matt JOHNSON (Blake BREWER kick) | CHAR 40–7 |
| 4 | 13:49 | CHAR | Corey NESMITH JR. 10 yd pass from Matt JOHNSON (Blake BREWER kick) | CHAR 47–7 |

In their second home game Charlotte faced the Chowan Hawks. Charlotte got their second victory in dominating fashion, winning 47–7.

Charlotte opened the scoring in the first half on an Austin Duke 10-yard touchdown reception from Matt Johnson. Charlotte scored the first safety in program history late in the first quarter. Blake Brewer added a 27-yard field goal, followed by a Kalif Phillips 40-yard touchdown reception from Matt Johnson to end the first-quarter scoring.

Chowan opened the second quarter scoring with a 35-yard touchdown reception for Antjuan Randall off a pass from Cameron Stover for Chowan's only points of the day. On the subsequent kickoff return Mikel Hunter returned the kick 96 yards for a touchdown, marking the longest scoring play in Charlotte's program history and ending the first-half scoring with Charlotte having a 26–7 lead.

Trent Bostick opened the third-quarter scoring with a 30-yard passing touchdown from Matt Johnson. Austin Duke closed the quarter with a 7-yard touchdown reception from Johnson as well.

The fourth quarter featured only one scoring drive, as Corey Nesmith Jr. caught in a 10-yard touchdown pass from Johnson, marking Matt Johnson's fifth touchdown pass of the day.

Top performers for the game once again included Charlotte Quarterback Matt Johnson, who passed for 256 yards and 5 touchdowns. Charlotte Running Back Alan Barnwell had 14 carries for 80 yards. Charlotte Receiver Austin Duke had 7 receptions for 83 yards and two touchdowns.

Game notes:

- First game against a Division II program.

=== NCCU Eagles ===
NCCU vs. Charlotte

| Team | 1 | 2 | 3 | 4 | Total |
|---|---|---|---|---|---|
| • Eagles | 6 | 7 | 20 | 7 | 40 |
| 49ers | 0 | 0 | 0 | 13 | 13 |

- Date: September 7
- Location: Jerry Richardson Stadium
  Charlotte, NC
- Game start: 12:06 pm EDT
- Elapsed time: 2:48
- Game attendance: 16,630
- Game weather: 69 °F (21 °C), Scattered Clouds, no wind
- Referee: Larry Saunders
- TV announcers (WCCB): Ryan Rose, Kenny Moore, Brandon Davidow, Jon Wilson

Scoring summary
| 1 | 06:56 | NCCU | Oleg PARENT 39 Yd | NCCU 3–0 |
| 1 | 02:08 | NCCU | Oleg PARENT 21 Yd | NCCU 6–0 |
| 2 | 02:24 | NCCU | Deyonta WRIGHT 4 Yd Run (Oleg PARENT Kick) | NCCU 13–0 |
| 3 | 14:46 | NCCU | Adrian WILKINS 100 Yd Kickoff Return (Oleg PARENT Kick) | NCCU 20–0 |
| 3 | 07:22 | NCCU | Tony WILLIAMS IV 48 Yd Interception Return (Pat Blocked) | NCCU 26–0 |
| 3 | 02:41 | NCCU | Idreis AUGUSTUS 2 Yd Run (Oleg PARENT Kick) | NCCU 33–0 |
| 4 | 08:20 | CHAR | Alan BARNWELL 2 Yd Run (Pat Failed) | NCCU 33–6 |
| 4 | 04:35 | NCCU | Idreis AUGUSTUS 5 Yd Run (Oleg PARENT Kick) | NCCU 40–6 |
| 4 | 00:06 | CHAR | Lee MCNIELL 10 Yd Run (Blake BREWER Kick) | NCCU 40–13 |

In their third home game Charlotte faced the NC Central Eagles. Charlotte suffered the first loss in program history as well as their first ever home loss, defeated soundly by the Eagles, 40–13

NC Central opened the scoring in the first half on two Oleg Parent field goals, the first from 39 yards and the second from 20 yards.

NC Central scored the first touchdown of the game late in the second quarter on a Deyonta Wright 4-yard run. NC Central took a 13–0 lead into halftime, holding the Charlotte 49ers to their first scoreless half of play.

Central took the opening second-half kickoff in on Adrian Wilkins 100-yard kickoff return. Midway through the third quarter a Tony Williams IV 48-yard interception of a Matt Johnson pass was returned for another Central touchdown. Idreis Augustus added a late third quarter score on a 2-yard run, holding the 49ers pointless going into the final quarter of play.

The 49ers avoided their first shutout after an Alan Barnwell 2-yard run gave them their first score of the game. Central responded on an Idreis Augustus 5-yard run. On the final play of the game the 49ers scored their second touchdown on a Lee McNeill 10-yard run.

Despite his 5 interceptions thrown in the game, Charlotte quarterback Matt Johnson passed for over 335 yards, setting a new personal best. NC Central running back Idreis Augustus had 16 carries for 80 yards and 2 touchdowns. Charlotte receiver Austin Duke had 7 receptions for 97.

Game notes:

- First game against a scholarship FCS opponent
- First loss in program history

=== #15 James Madison Dukes ===
JMU vs. Charlotte

| Team | 1 | 2 | 3 | 4 | Total |
|---|---|---|---|---|---|
| 49ers | 7 | 0 | 0 | 0 | 7 |
| • Dukes | 14 | 6 | 7 | 7 | 34 |

- Date: September 21
- Location: Bridgeforth Stadium
  Harrisonburg, VA
- Game start: 6:00 pm EDT
- Elapsed time: 2:48
- Game attendance: 18,302
- Game weather: 65 °F (18 °C), Rain, no wind
- Referee: Charles Jebran

Scoring summary
| 1 | 14:30 | CHAR | Matt JOHNSON 8 yd run (Blake BREWER kick) | CHAR 7–0 |
| 1 | 10:33 | JMU | Dae'Quan SCOTT 9 yd run (Cameron STARKE kick) | TIED 7–7 |
| 1 | 02:44 | JMU | Dae'Quan SCOTT 20 yd run (Cameron STARKE kick) | JMU 14–7 |
| 2 | 06:17 | JMU | Quintin HUNTER 37 yd pass From Michael BIRDSONG (Pat failed) | JMU 20–7 |
| 3 | 05:45 | JMU | Rashard DAVIS 36 yd run (Cameron STARKE kick) | JMU 27–7 |
| 4 | 11:20 | JMU | Khalid Abdullah 6 yd run (Cameron STARKE kick) | JMU 34–7 |

James Madison was a late addition to the Charlotte 49ers' 2013 football schedule. Originally Charlotte had been scheduled to play future C-USA opponent ODU in 2013 and 2014. ODU, having secured a game against Vanderbilt during the summer, dropped the return game at Charlotte in 2014. Needing a short notice replacement home game for the next season, Charlotte reached out to JMU. JMU agreed to add an away game against Charlotte in 2014 in exchange for a home game in 2013. Subsequently, Charlotte dropped the ODU game in 2013 and replaced them with the game at JMU.

This was not only the first away game in Charlotte 49ers football history, but also the first night game and the first road loss. In addition, James Madison was ranked 15th in the Week 3 FCS polls at the time, making them Charlotte's first ranked opponent.

Charlotte recovered a JMU fumble on the opening kickoff, which set up a touchdown two plays later as Matt Johnson ran it in from 8 yards out. This early lead proved to be Charlotte's only scoring drive of the game. JMU answered on a 13-play scoring drive that concluded with a Dae'Quan Scott 9-yard rushing touchdown. Charlotte's next drive included 12 plays and got the 49ers to the JMU 1 yard line, but Charlotte turned the ball over on downs after being unable to break the plane of the goal line. JMU's next drive ended in a score as Dea'Quan Scott ran the ball in from 20 yards out for his second touchdown of the quarter.

The only score of the second quarter was a Michael Birdsong 37-yard pass to Quinton Hunter for a touchdown. Charlotte attempted a 58-yard field goal at the end of the half but missed. The halftime score was JMU up, 20–7.

The only score of the third quarter came on a Rashard Davis 36-yard rushing touchdown.

The final score of the game came in the fourth quarter as Khalid Abdullah ran in a touchdown from 2 yards out. The game ended in a JMU 34 to 7 victory.

Top performers for the game were all from JMU. Quarterback Michael Birdsong passed for 201 yards and 2 touchdowns, with only 1 interception. JMU running back Dae'Quan Scott had 35 carries for 176 yards and 2 touchdowns. JMU receiver Quinton Hunter had 3 receptions for 63 yards and a touchdown.

Game notes:

- First away game in program history.
- First away loss in program history.
- First night game in program history.
- First ranked opponent in program history.
- First rain game in program history.
- First out of state game in program history.
- First game in program history played in Virginia.

=== Presbyterian Blue Hose ===
Presbyterian vs. Charlotte

| Team | 1 | 2 | 3 | 4 | Total |
|---|---|---|---|---|---|
| • 49ers | 7 | 21 | 14 | 3 | 45 |
| Blue Hose | 14 | 0 | 0 | 7 | 21 |

- Date: September 28
- Location: Bailey Memorial Stadium
  Clinton, SC
- Game start: 2:05 pm EDT
- Elapsed time: 3:05
- Game attendance: 5,268
- Game weather: 73 °F (23 °C), Partly Cloudy, 10 mph (16 km/h) E
- Referee: Riley Johnson
- TV announcers (ESPN3): Evan Lepler, Nate Ross

Scoring summary
| 1 | 07:14 | PRES | Kaleb GRIFFIN 1 Yd Run (Brett WILSON Kick) | PRES 7–0 |
| 1 | 04:08 | CHAR | Austin DUKE 3 Yd Pass From Matt JOHNSON (Blake BREWER Kick) | TIED 7–7 |
| 1 | 00:51 | PRES | Demarcus ROUSE 1 Yd Run (Brett WILSON Kick) | PRES 14–7 |
| 2 | 4:14 | CHAR | Kalif PHILLILPS 1 Yd Run (Blake BREWER Kick) | TIED 14–14 |
| 2 | 03:41 | CHAR | Alan BARNWELL 1 Yd Run (Blake BREWER Kick) | CHAR 21–14 |
| 2 | 01:04 | CHAR | Mikel HUNTER 53 Yd Pass From Matt JOHNSON (Blake BREWER Kick) | CHAR 28–14 |
| 3 | 12:57 | CHAR | Trent BOSTICK 23 Yd Pass From Matt JOHNSON (Blake BREWER Kick) | CHAR 35–14 |
| 3 | 02:47 | CHAR | Kalif PHILLILPS 7 Yd Run (Blake BREWER Kick) | CHAR 42–14 |
| 4 | 10:20 | CHAR | Blake Blake Brewer 30 Yd 30 Yd | CHAR 45–14 |
| 4 | 06:33 | PRES | Demarcus ROUSE 2 Yd Run (Brett WILSON Kick) | CHAR 45–21 |

Charlotte returned to their previous high-scoring ways on their second road game in program history. Presbyterian was the first of Charlotte's four games of the season against Big South Conference opponents. This would mark Charlotte's first ever away win. This would also be Charlotte's first nationally available game as part of ESPN3's broadcast package.

Presbyterian would score first on their second drive of the game. A Kaleb Griffin rushing touchdown from the 1-yard line. Charlotte would answer on the next drive with a Matt Johnson 3-yard scoring pass to Austin Duke for a touchdown. Presbyterian would take a 7-point lead into the second quarter after a Demarcus Wilson 1-yard rushing touchdown to close out the first quarter.

Kalif Phillips started a dominating Charlotte performance in the second quarter with a 1-yard rushing touchdown on the first drive of the quarter to tie the game. Charlotte would turn the ball over on an interception early in their next drive, but Presbyterian would be unable to convert the first down. Charlotte's next drive included 16 plays and resulted in an Alan Barnwell 1-yard touchdown to give Charlotte its first lead of the game. Charlotte would take a 14-point lead into the half after a Matt Johnson 53-yard pass to Mikel Hunter resulted in 7 more points. The halftime score was Charlotte up 28 to 14.

Charlotte continued their dominance into the second half as the 49ers ended their first drive of the half with a 23-yard Trent Bostick touchdown pass from Matt Johnson. Later in the half Kalif Phillips would get his second rushing touchdown of the day from 7 yards out.

Blake Brewer would add 3 points off a 30-yard field goal after the first Charlotte drive of the fourth quarter stalled. Presbyterian's next drive resulted in a Demarcus Rouse's second touchdown of the day from 2 yards out. Charlotte won the game 45 to 21.

Top performers for the game were Charlotte Quarterback Matt Johnson, who passed for 269 yards and 3 touchdowns, with only 1 interception. Presbyterian Running Back Demarcus Rouse had 18 carries for 79 yards and 2 touchdowns. Presbyterian Receiver Toby Antigha had 6 receptions for 100 yards.

Game Notes:

- First away victory.
- First game in program history played in South Carolina.

=== #24 Gardner-Webb Running Bulldogs ===
Gardner-Webb vs. Charlotte

| Team | 1 | 2 | 3 | 4 | Total |
|---|---|---|---|---|---|
| Runnin' Bulldogs | 17 | 7 | 21 | 6 | 51 |
| • 49ers | 7 | 17 | 0 | 29 | 53 |

- Date: October 5
- Location: Jerry Richardson Stadium
  Charlotte, NC
- Game start: 12:08 pm EDT
- Elapsed time: 3:43
- Game attendance: 12,222
- Game weather: 77 °F (25 °C), Partly Cloudy, no wind
- Referee: Marshall Lewis
- TV announcers (WCCB): Ryan Rose, Kenny Moore, Brandon Davidow, Jon Wilson

Scoring summary
| 1 | 08:36 | GWU | Jordan DAY 22 Yd | GWU 3–0 |
| 1 | 04:09 | GWU | Kenny COOK 3 Yd Pass From Lucas BEATTY (Jordan DAY Kick) | GWU 10–0 |
| 1 | 02:50 | CHAR | Kalif PHILLIPS 6 Yd Run (Blake BREWER Kick) | GWU 10–7 |
| 1 | 00:16 | GWU | Kenny COOK 20 Yd Pass From Lucas BEATTY (Jordan DAY Kick) | GWU 17–7 |
| 2 | 13:32 | CHAR | C.J. CRAWFORD 16 Yd Pass From Matt JOHNSON (Blake BREWER Kick) | GWU 17–14 |
| 2 | 09:55 | GWU | Earnest HARMON 3 Yd Pass From Lucas BEATTY (Jordan DAY Kick) | GWU 24–14 |
| 2 | 07:28 | CHAR | Blake BREWER 43 Yd | GWU 24–17 |
| 2 | 00:14 | CHAR | Austin DUKE 26 Yd Pass From Matt JOHNSON (Blake BREWER Kick) | TIED 24–24 |
| 3 | 10:13 | GWU | Earnest HARMON 1 Yd Pass From Lucas BEATTY (Jordan DAY Kick) | GWU 31–24 |
| 3 | 08:31 | GWU | Juanne BLOUNT 1 Yd Run (Jordan DAY Kick) | GWU 38–24 |
| 3 | 05:30 | GWU | Mike ESTES 27 Yd Pass From Richard JULES (Jordan DAY Kick) | GWU 45–24 |
| 4 | 12:30 | CHAR | C.J. CEAWFORD 5 Yd Pass From Matt JOHNSON (Blake BREWER Kick) | GWU 45–31 |
| 4 | 05:20 | CHAR | Ball Through End Zone | GWU 45–33 |
| 4 | 04:27 | CHAR | Austin DUKE 21 Yd Pass From Matt JOHNSON (Blake BREWER Kick) | GWU 45–40 |
| 4 | 03:15 | CHAR | Trent BOSTICK 48 Yd Pass From Matt JOHNSON (Two-Point Conversion Failed) | CHAR 46–45 |
| 4 | 02:19 | CHAR | Alan BARNWELL 56 Yd Run (Blake BREWER Kick) | CHAR 53–45 |
| 4 | 00:31 | GWU | Juanne BLOUNT 1 Yd Run (Two-Point Conversion Failed) | CHAR 53–51 |

Charlotte returned home from its two-game road trip for Military Appreciation Day to face their second ranked opponent and second Big South team of the year, the one-loss Gardner-Webb Runnin' Bulldogs. Gardner-Webb would score first, completing a Jordan Day 22-yard field goal after a 15-play drive. Lucas Beatty would complete a 3-yard pass to Kenny Cook for the Bulldogs' first touchdown. Charlotte scored their first touchdown of the day on a Kalif Phillips 6-yard run. The Bulldogs closed the first-quarter scoring on another Lucas Beatty pass to Kenny Cook for a 20-yard touchdown.

The 49ers would open the second quarter with a touchdown drive that would be completed with a Matt Johnson 16-yard pass to C.J. Crawford. Gardner-Webb would respond on the next drive with a Lucas Beatty 3-yard touchdown pass to Earnest Harmon. Blake Brewer added 3 more 49ers' points on a 43-yard field goal. On the final 49ers' drive of the half Matt Johnson completed a 26-yard pass to Austin Duke to tie the game at the half, 24 all.

The Bulldogs broke the halftime tie on their first drive of the second half, with Lucas Beatty completing another touchdown pass to Earnest Harmon from the 1-yard line. Gardner-Webb dominated the third quarter, adding two more touchdowns. The second score of the quarter would come after Blake Brewer's 48-yard field goal attempt was blocked by Drew White and recovered by the Bulldogs. On the same play Charlotte was penalized twice for unsportsmanlike conduct. The result was a Juanne Blount 1-yard touchdown run on the next play. The third GWU touchdown of the quarter would come on their next drive. Richard Jules would complete a 27-yard pass to Mike Estes. Blake Brewer would miss a 39-yard field goal to close out the half, with Gardner-Webb having a lead, 45–24.

Charlotte's fortunes would turn around dramatically in the fourth quarter, starting with a Matt Johnson 5-yard touchdown pass to C.J. Crawford. After a 3-and-out series for the Bulldogs, the 49ers would block the punt return and GWU would down it in the end zone for a safety. Charlotte would score again on the next drive of the quarter, a Matt Johnson 21-yard touchdown pass to Austin Duke. After another Bulldog's 3-and-out, Charlotte kick returner Mikel Hunter would return the ball to Gardner-Webb's 48 yard line. On the next play Matt Johnson would complete a 48-yard touchdown pass to Trent Bostick. The result was the 49ers' third touchdown of the fourth quarter and their first lead of the day. The two-point conversion attempt to give the 49ers a 3-point lead failed. On Gardner-Webb's second play after getting the ball back the 49ers' Caleb Clayton-Moby would force GWU's Juanne Blount to fumble, leading to 49er Mark Hogan recovering the ball for Charlotte. On the very next play Alan Barnwell scored a 54-yard rushing touchdown to put the 49ers up by 8 points with 3 minutes left in the game.

With time running out, Gardner-Webb put together a 14-play drive that resulted in a Juanne Blount 1-yard rushing touchdown. The Bulldogs' attempted 2-point conversion to tie the game failed. Gardner-Webb attempted an on-sides kick recovery, but Charlotte recovered the ball for the come-from-behind victory, winning 53 to 51 and the first victory in program history over a ranked opponent.

Top performers for the game were Charlotte quarterback Matt Johnson, who passed for 342 yards and 5 touchdowns. Gardner-Webb running back Juanne Blount had 32 carries for 133 yards and 2 touchdowns. Gardner-Webb receiver Kenny Cook had 10 receptions for 132 yards and 2 touchdowns.

Game notes:

- First victory over a ranked opponent

=== #13 (DII) UNC Pembroke Braves ===
UNC Pembroke vs. Charlotte

| Team | 1 | 2 | 3 | 4 | Total |
|---|---|---|---|---|---|
| • Braves | 14 | 7 | 17 | 7 | 45 |
| 49ers | 8 | 0 | 7 | 7 | 22 |

- Date: October 12
- Location: Jerry Richardson Stadium
  Charlotte, NC
- Game start: 12:08 pm EDT
- Elapsed time: 3:13
- Game attendance: 16,630
- Game weather: 72 °F (22 °C), Scattered Clouds, no wind
- Referee: Thomas Graham
- TV announcers (WCCB): Ryan Rose, Kenny Moore, Brandon Davidow, Jon Wilson

Scoring summary
| 1 | 10:40 | UNCP | Rontonio STANLEY 2 Yd Run (Connor HASKINS Kick) | UNCP 7–0 |
| 1 | 08:26 | CHAR | Mikel HUNTER 2 Yd Pass From Matt JOHNSON (Lee MCNEILL Run For Two-Point Conversion) | CHAR 8–7 |
| 1 | 05:02 | UNCP | Rontonio STANLEY 2 Yd Run (Connor HASKINS Kick) | UNCP 14–8 |
| 2 | 06:34 | UNCP | Te'vell WILLIAMS 23 Yd Pass From Luke CHARLES (Connor HASKINS Kick) | UNCP 21–8 |
| 3 | 10:15 | UNCP | Elliott POWELL 5 Yd Run (Connor HASKINS Kick) | UNCP 28–8 |
| 3 | 06:57 | UNCP | Te'vell WILLIAMS 56 Yd Pass From Luke CHARLES (Connor HASKINS Kick) | UNCP 35–8 |
| 3 | 02:28 | UNCP | Connor HASKINS 46 Yd | UNCP 38–8 |
| 3 | 00:27 | CHAR | C.J. CRAWFORD 4 Yd Pass From Matt JOHNSON (Blake BREWER Kick) | UNCP 38–15 |
| 4 | 09:26 | UNCP | B.J. BUNN 8 Yd Pass From Luke CHARLES (Connor HASKINS Kick) | UNCP 45–15 |
| 4 | 03:48 | CHAR | C.J. CRAWFORD 17 Yd Pass From Matt JOHNSON (Blake BREWER Kick) | UNCP 45–22 |

Charlotte would hold its first football Homecoming game against the #13 ranked team in DII, the senior laden UNC Pembroke Braves.

The Braves would take an early lead on their first drive of the game, scoring 7 points on a Rontonio Stanley 2-yard rushing touchdown. Charlotte would respond on the next drive, resulting in a Matt Johnson 2-yard touchdown pass to Mikel Hunter. The successful two-point conversion by Lee McNeill would give the 49ers a 1-point lead. Rontonio Stanley would score another 2-yard rushing touchdown to close out the first quarter scoring.

Pembroke would score the only points of the second quarter on a Luke Charles pass to Te’well Williams for 23 yards for a touchdown. The Braves would go into Halftime with a 21 to 8 lead.

Pembroke would complete the opening drive of the second half with Elliot Powell 5-yard rushing touchdown. On the Braves next drive Luke Charles would pass again to Te’well Williams for 23 yards for a touchdown. Connor Haskins would add 3 more points to Pembroke's total on a 46-yard field goal. The 49ers would end their scoring drought on the last drive of the third quarter when Matt Johnson would successfully complete a 4-yard pass to C.J. Crawford for a touchdown.

Pembroke would conclude its scoring campaign for the day on their first drive of the fourth quarter. Luke Charles would complete his third touchdown pass of the day, when he connected on an 8-yard touchdown pass to B.J. Bunn. The 49ers would score late in the half on a Matt Johnson 17-yard touchdown pass to C.J. Crawford. The game would end with the Braves upsetting the 49ers' inaugural football Homecoming Game, 45 to 22.

Top performers for the game were Charlotte Quarterback Matt Johnson, who passed for 278 yards, 3 touchdowns and 1 interception. Charlotte Running Back Alan Barnwell had 9 carries for 49. Charlotte Receiver Austin Duke had 9 receptions for 128 yards.

Charlotte would enter its first of two bye weeks in the season with a 4 to 3 record.

Game Notes:

- Only loss to a Division II team in program history.

=== #24 Charleston Southern Buccaneers ===
Charleston Southern vs. Charlotte

| Team | 1 | 2 | 3 | 4 | Total |
|---|---|---|---|---|---|
| 49ers | 0 | 7 | 0 | 7 | 14 |
| • Buccaneers | 0 | 15 | 6 | 15 | 36 |

- Date: October 26
- Location: Buccaneer Field
  North Charleston, SC
- Game start: 1:00 pm EDT
- Elapsed time: 2:52
- Game attendance: 4,319
- Game weather: 65 °F (18 °C), Mostly Cloudy, 10 mph (16 km/h) NNE
- Referee: Kelvin Thorpe

Scoring summary
| 1 | 06:08 | CHAR | Kalif PHILLIPS 7 Yd Run (Blake BREWER Kick) | CHAR 7–0 |
| 2 | 12:20 | CHSO | Kyle COPELAND 3 Yd Run (Kyle COPELAND Run For Two-Point Conversion) | CHSO 8–7 |
| 2 | 00:08 | CHSO | Kevin GLEARS 39 Yd Pass From Daniel CROGHAN III (Mark DEBOY Kick) | CHSO 15 -7 |
| 3 | 10:13 | CHSO | Chris THEODORE 14 Yd Pass From Daniel CROGHAN III (Pat Failed) | CHSO 21–7 |
| 3 | 06:52 | CHAR | Kalif PHILLIPS 14 Yd Run (Blake BREWER Kick) | CHSO 21–14 |
| 4 | 14:12 | CHSO | Team Tackled By Chris THEODORE In End Zone | CHSO 23–14 |
| 4 | 05:09 | CHSO | Kyle COPELAND 5 Yd Run (T.J. HIGGINS Kick) | CHSO 30–14 |
| 4 | 03:43 | CHSO | Mike HOLLOWAY 5 Yd Run (Two-Point Conversion Failed) | CHSO 36–14 |

Charlotte would face their third ranked opponent of the season, and their third Big South opponent in the Charleston Southern Buccaneers. The game was Charleston Southern's homecoming, and their on-the-field performance would reflect a desire to please the returning alumni.

Charlotte would strike first in the game with a Kalif Phillips' 7-yard rushing touchdown. On the next series Charleston Southern would miss a Mark Deboy 29-yard field goal to close out the first quarter.

The Buccaneers would find the end zone for the first time in the day on a Kyle Copeland 3-yard touchdown run. Copeland would also score the subsequent two-point conversion to give the Buccaneers a 1-point lead. Daniel Croghan III would complete a 39-yard pass to Kevin Glears for the final points of the half. Charleston Southern would lead at halftime, 15 to 7.

On their first drive of the second half, the Buccaneers would conclude with a Daniel Croghan 14-yard touchdown pass to Chris Theodore. Charlotte would respond on the next drive with 13 plays ending in a 14-yard Kalif Phillips rushing touchdown. The 49ers would end the half down only by 7 points.

Desmond Cooper would recover a Daniel Croghan fumble on Charlotte's 3-yard line to end a Charleston Southern drive. Two plays later Alan Barnwell would be tackled in the end zone by Caleb Batchelor for a safety. Charleston Southern would then attempt an onsides kick, by the 49ers would recover the ball. Charleston Southern would pad their lead with two late touchdowns. The first on a Kyle Copeland's third rushing touchdown of the day, this time from the 5-yard line. Zac Bumgardner would recover an Alan Barnwell fumble on Charlotte's Next play from scrimmage. Three plays later the Buccaneers would score the final points of the game on a Mike Holloway 5-yard rushing touchdown. The game would end in a Buccaneer home victory of 35 to 14, and the Charlotte 49ers' second road loss of the season.

Top performers for the game were Charleston Southern Quarterback Daniel Croghan III, who passed for 173 yards and 2 touchdowns. Charleston Southern Running Back Christian Reyes had 26 carries for 181 yards. Charlotte Receiver Trent Bostick had 5 receptions for 114 yards.

=== #3 Coastal Carolina Chanticleers ===
Coastal Carolina vs. Charlotte

| Team | 1 | 2 | 3 | 4 | Total |
|---|---|---|---|---|---|
| 49ers | 3 | 15 | 0 | 7 | 25 |
| • Chanticlieers | 14 | 16 | 6 | 14 | 50 |

- Date: November 2
- Location: Brooks Stadium
  Conway, SC
- Game start: 3:00 pm EDT
- Elapsed time: 3:11
- Game attendance: 9,221
- Game weather: 71 °F (22 °C), Broken Clouds, 10 mph (16 km/h) WNW
- Referee: Duane Heydt
- TV announcers (WCCB, WFXB, WOLO): Ryan Rose, Kenny Moore

Scoring summary
| 1 | 07:14 | CCU | Lorenzo TALIAFARRO 5 Yd Run (Alex CATRON Kick) | CCU 7–0 |
| 1 | 02:32 | CHAR | Blake BREWER 30 Yd | CCU 7–3 |
| 1 | 00:06 | CCU | Matt HAZEL 5 Yd Pass From Alex ROSS (Alex CATRON Kick) | CCU 14–3 |
| 2 | 13:17 | CHAR | Matt JOHNSON 9 Yd Run (Mark PETTIT Run For Two-Point Conversion) | CCU 14–11 |
| 2 | 13:02 | CCU | DeMario BENNETT 39 Yd Pass From Alex ROSS (Alex CATRON Kick) | CCU 21–11 |
| 2 | 06:21 | CCU | Alex CATRON 29 Yd | CCU 24–11 |
| 2 | 04:06 | CHAR | Alan BARNWELL 8 Yd Run (Blake BREWER Kick) | CCU 24–18 |
| 2 | 01:30 | CCU | Lorenzo TALIAFARRO 3 Yd Run (Two-Point Conversion Failed) | CCU 30–18 |
| 3 | 10:21 | CCU | De'Angelo Henderson 2 Yd Run (Two-Point Conversion Failed) | CCU 36–18 |
| 4 | 13:27 | CCU | Lorenzo TALIAFARRO 4 Yd Run (Alex CATRON Kick) | CCU 43–18 |
| 4 | 08:12 | CCU | Brian KASS 2 Yd Run (Alex CATRON Kick) | CCU 50–18 |
| 4 | 04:53 | CHAR | Kalif PHILLIPS 2 Yd Run (Blake BREWER Kick) | CCU 50–25 |

Charlotte would face their fourth and final ranked opponent of the season, and their fourth and final Big South opponent in the #3 ranked Coastal Carolina Chanticleers. The Chanticleers would be the 49ers' highest ranked opponent of the season. The game was Coastal Carolina's homecoming, making the third homecoming game in a row for the 49ers.

Lorrenzo Taliaferro would score the first points of the day on a 5-yard touchdown run on Coastal's second drive of the game. Charlotte would respond on a 16 play drive with a Blake Brewer 30-yard field goal. Coastal would add its second touchdown of the quarter on an Alex Ross 5-yard pass to Matt Hazel.

The 49ers would close the score to within 3 points on their first drive of the second quarter. Matt Johnson would score a 9-yard rushing touchdown followed by a successful Mark Pettit two-point conversion. Coastal would answer quickly on an Alex Ross 39-yard touchdown pass to DeMario Bennett. Coastal would later in the quarter go on a 20 play drive that ended in an Alex Catron 29-yard field goal. Charlotte would respond on the next drive with an Alan Barnwell 8-yard rushing touchdown to bring the score back to within 6 points. Taliaferro would tie the Big South Conference single season rushing touchdown record on a 3-yard run. Coastal would go to the half with a 30 to 18 lead.

De'Angelo Henderson would stretch Coastal's lead on the opening drive of the second half with a 2-yard rushing touchdown. Charlotte would get to the Coastal 19 yard line on the next series before LaDarius Hawthorne would intercept a Matt Johnson pass.

On the first drive of the fourth quarter Lorrenzo Taliaferro would score his final touchdown of the day from 4 yards out to set the Big South Conference single season rushing touchdown record. Brian Cass would add another 2-yard rushing touchdown to pad Coastal's substantial lead. Kalif Phillips would give the 49ers 2-yard rushing touchdown, but it would not be enough to overcome the point deficit. Coastal won the game 50 to 25.

Top performers for the game were Coastal Carolina Quarterback Alex Ross, who passed for 237 yards and 2 touchdowns. Coastal Carolina Running Back Lorenzo Taliaferro had 24 carries for 139 yards and 3 touchdowns. Charlotte Receiver Mikel Hunter had 5 receptions for 89 yards.

=== #20 (DIII) Wesley College Wolverines ===
Wesley College vs. Charlotte

| Team | 1 | 2 | 3 | 4 | Total |
|---|---|---|---|---|---|
| • Wolverines | 7 | 7 | 7 | 14 | 35 |
| 49ers | 0 | 7 | 14 | 7 | 28 |

- Date: November 9
- Location: Jerry Richardson Stadium
  Charlotte, NC
- Game start: 12:05 pm EST
- Elapsed time: 3:28
- Game attendance: 14,534
- Game weather: 53 °F (12 °C), Partly Cloudy, 1 mph (1.6 km/h)
- Referee: Lee Hendrick
- TV announcers (WCCB): Ryan Rose, Kenny Moore, Mark Davidow, Jon Wilson

Scoring summary
| 1 | 09:33 | WESL | Joe CALLAHAN 1 yd run (Jon STORCK kick) | WESL 7-0 |
| 2 | 04:19 | WESL | Kyle GEORGE 2 Yd Pass From Joe CALLAHAN (Jon STORCK Kick) | WESL 14-0 |
| 2 | 02:43 | CHAR | Kalif PHILLIPS 12 Yd Run (Blake BREWER Kick) | WESL 14-7 |
| 3 | 14:16 | CHAR | Mark PETTIT 22 Yd Pass From Lee MCNEILL (Blake BREWER Kick) | TIED 14-14 |
| 3 | 09:33 | CHAR | Matt JOHNSON 3 Yd Pass From C.J. CRAWFORD (Blake BREWER Kick) | CHAR 21-14 |
| 3 | 02:09 | WESL | Rick JACKSON 2 Yd Run (Jon STORCK Kick) | TIED 21-21 |
| 4 | 14:56 | CHAR | Kalif PHILLIPS 1 Yd Run (Blake BREWER Kick) | CHAR 28-21 |
| 4 | 08:41 | WESL | Bryce SHADE 17 Yd Pass From Joe CALLAHAN (Jon STORCK Kick) | TIED 28-28 |
| 4 | 02:14 | WESL | Joe CALLAHAN 1 Yd Run (Jon STORCK Kick) | WESL 35-28 |

Charlotte returned home on November 9 for their 6th and final home game of season against ranked DIII opponent Wesley College. It was also the inaugural football Senior Day for the 49ers. The Niners said good bye and thanks to six of the players from the inaugural team; Mark Hogan, C.J. Crawford, Brandon Strupp, Alex Petzke, Zeb Little and Mikel Hunter.

Wesley would strike first in the first half with a Joe Callahan 1-yard run for a touchdown. The Wolverines would hold the 49ers scoreless in the first quarter.

Wesley would strike first again midway through the second quarter when Joe Callahan would connect on a 2-yard pass to Kyle George for 7 more points after Jon Storck's successful Point-After attempt. Charlotte would finally find the endzone on the next series on a Kalif Phillips 12-yard rushing touchdown. The score at the half would be Wesley up 14 to 7 on the 49ers.

Charlotte would open the second half by recovering a forced fumble on the opening kickoff at the Wesley 22 yard line. They'd line up for a field goal attempt after gaining no yards on a 3-and-out series, but backup quarterback and place holder Lee McNeill would throw the snapped ball to Mark Pettit, who was waiting for it in the endzone for a touchdown. After Wesley went 3-and-out on their next series, Charlotte would gain the lead for the first time in the day off a Matt Johnson 3-yard touchdown pass to C.J. Crawford. Later in the quarter the Wolverines would tie the score again on a Rick Jackson 2-yard rushing touchdown.

Charlotte would score on the opening play of the fourth quarter on a Kalif Phillips 1-yard rushing touchdown. Three series later Joe Callahan would connect with Bryce Shade for a 17-yard passing touchdown to tie the score for the third time in the day. With 2 and a half minutes left on the clock Wesley would retake the lead on a Joe Callahan 1-yard rushing touchdown. Charlotte would put together a 12 play drive to get to the Wesley 28 yard line, but Charlotte Quarterback Matt Johnson would be unable to connect on three subsequent passing plays and would turn the ball over on downs. Wesley would then take a knee to win 35 to 28.

Top performers for the day would include Wesley Quarterback Joe Callahan, who passed for 317 yards and 2 touchdowns, with 2 interceptions. Charlotte Running Back Kaliff Phillips would rush for 93 yards and two touchdowns. Wesley Wide Receiver Kyle George would get 8 receptions for 143 yards and a touchdown.

Game Notes:

- First game against a Division III team in program history.
- Only loss to a Division III team in program history.

=== Morehead State Eagles ===
Morehead State vs. Charlotte

| Team | 1 | 2 | 3 | 4 | Total |
|---|---|---|---|---|---|
| • 49ers | 13 | 28 | 7 | 13 | 61 |
| Eagles | 7 | 3 | 0 | 7 | 17 |

- Date: November 23
- Location: Jayne Stadium
  Morehead, KT
- Game start: 1:00 pm EST
- Elapsed time: 2:46
- Game attendance: 1,443
- Game weather: 39 °F (4 °C), Sunny, 10 mph (16 km/h) N
- Referee: James Arnold

Scoring summary
| 1 | 9:36 | MORE | Brandon BORNHAUSER 1 yd run (Luke BOYD kick) | MORE 7-1 |
| 1 | 5:21 | CHAR | C.J. CRAWFORD 33 yd pass from Matt JOHNSON (Blake BREWER kick) | TIED 7-7 |
| 1 | 3:31 | CHAR | Kalif PHILLIPS 50 yd run (Mark PETTIT rush failed) | CHAR 13-7 |
| 2 | 14:46 | CHAR | Alan BARNWELL 70 yd run (Blake BREWER kick) | CHAR 20-7 |
| 2 | 11:11 | CHAR | Caleb CLAYTON-MOLBY 70 yd interception return (Blake BREWER kick) | CHAR 27-7 |
| 2 | 6:56 | CHAR | Kalif PHILLIPS 4 yd run (Blake BREWER kick) | CHAR 34-7 |
| 2 | 0:29 | MORE | Luke BOYD 35 yd field goal | CHAR 34-10 |
| 2 | 0:08 | CHAR | Kalif PHILLIPS 12 yd run (Blake BREWER kick) | CHAR 41-10 |
| 3 | 2:23 | CHAR | Matt JOHNSON 68 yd run (Blake BREWER kick) | CHAR 48-10 |
| 4 | 13:58 | MORE | Justin CORNWALL 19 yd pass from Austin GAHAFER (Luke BOYD kick) | CHAR 48-17 |
| 4 | 12:00 | CHAR | Blake BREWER 41 yd field goal | CHAR 51-17 |
| 4 | 7:08 | CHAR | Blake BREWER 40 yard field goal | CHAR 54-17 |
| 4 | 5:43 | CHAR | Damarrell ALEXANDER 51 yd run (Blake BREWER kick) | CHAR 61-17 |

Following their second and final bye week of the 2013 season, Charlotte would end their inaugural season on the road facing the first opponent they ever scheduled, the Morehead State Eagles.

Morehead St. would score on their first drive of the game on a Brandon Bornhauser 1-yard touchdown run to take the early lead. On their third offensive series the 49ers would tie the game on a Matt Johnson 33-yard touchdown pass to senior receiver C.J. Crawford. On their next offensive series on the second play the 49ers would take the lead on a Kalif Phillips 50-yard rushing touchdown.

On the first play of the second quarter Charlotte rusher Alan Barnwell would extend the 49ers' lead on a break-away 70-yard touchdown run. The Eagles would put together an 11 play drive to get into 49ers' territory on the next series, but the 49ers' Caleb Clayton-Mobly would intercept a pass from Eagles quarterback Austin Gahafer and return it 70 yards for another 49ers' touchdown. On the 49ers' next series Kaliff Phillips would get his second rushing score of the day on a 4-yard touchdown score. Morehead St. would put together a 13 play series late in the half that ended in a Luke Boyd 35-yard field goal. On the ensuing kick return Charlotte returner Justin Bridges-Thompson would return the kick 64 yards to the Morehead St. 12 yard line. On the next play Kalif Phillips would get his third rushing touchdown on a 12-yard run. At the half Charlotte lead the Eagles 41 to 10.

After the high scoring second quarter, the third quarter would only yield one score. Morehead St. would attempt a 44-yard Luke Boyd field goal to end their first drive of the second half, but would miss. Charlotte would cap their final drive of the quarter on a Matt Johnson, 68 yard quarterback-keeper rushing touchdown.

The Eagles would find the end zone on their first series of the fourth quarter on an Austin Gahafer pass to Justin Cornwall for a 19-yard touchdown in the corner of the end zone. The 49ers would cap their next possession on a Blake Brewer 41-yard field goal. On their first play of the next series the 49ers' Kendal Parker forced Brandon Reeves of Morehead St. to fumble the ball, which resulted in Charlotte's Greg Cunningham Jr. recovering the ball for the 49ers. Their resulting next drive was capped by a Blake Brewer 40-yard field goal. After a Morehead St. four-and-out the 49ers scored the final points of the game on a Damarrell Alexander 51-yard rushing touchdown, to get the 49ers over the 60-point scoring threshold for the first time in program history. The final score was Charlotte 61 and Morehead State 17.

Top performers for the day were Charlotte quarterback Matt Johnson, who passed for 141 yards and ran in a touchdown. Charlotte running back Kaliff Phillips rushed for 86 yards and three touchdowns. Charlotte Wide receiver C.J. Crawford made 5 receptions for 68 yards and a touchdown.

Game notes:

First game in program history played in Kentucky.

== Attendance ==
The largest crowd for a Charlotte football game at Jerry Richardson Stadium was 16,630. The 49ers hit that figure three times during the 2013 season including the Inaugural Game. This figure is the current maximum standing room capacity of Jerry Richardson Stadium. They also exceeded the stadium's maximum seating capacity 4 times during the season.

| Season | Games | Sellouts | W–L (%) | Attendance | Average | Best |
| 2013 | 6 | 4 | 3–3 (.500) | 93,244 | 15,540 | 16,630 |

== Statistics ==
As the 49ers inaugural season, team and individual records were set for the first time in 2013.

=== Season records ===
2013 Charlotte 49ers Football Team Season Records
| Category | Record |
|---|---|
| Games played | 11 |
| Win–loss–tie | 5-6-0 |
| Home record | 3-3-0 |
| Away record | 2-3-0 |
| All purpose yards per game | 571.9 yds |
| Total plays | 827 |
| Total offense | 4934 yds |
| Total offense per game | 448.5 yds |
| Yards per play | 6.7 yds |
| Total points | 367 |
| Touchdowns | 48 |
| Points per game | 33.4 |
| First downs | 256 |
| Rushing first downs | 114 |
| Passing first downs | 118 |
| Penalty first downs | 24 |
| First downs per game | 23.3 |
| Penalties | 70 |
| Penalty yards | 587 yds |
| Penalty yards average | 53.4 yds |
| Time of possession per game | 24:41 |
| Third down conversions | 63/159 |
| Fourth down conversions | 11/20 |
| On-side kicks | 1/2 |
| Red-zone scores | 34/43 |
| Red-zone touchdowns | 29/43 |
| Touchdown rushes | 23 |
| TD rushing points | 138 |
| Rushes | 439 |
| Yards rushing | 2275 yds |
| Yards per rush | 5.2 yds |
| Longest rush | 70 yds |
| Touchdown passes | 22 |
| TD passing points | 132 |
| Yards passing | 2659 yds |
| Pass attempts | 388 |
| Pass completions | 230 |
| Interceptions | 12 |
| Longest pass | 53 |
| Yards per pass | 6.9 yds |
| Yards per catch | 11.6 yds |
| Pass efficiency | 129.37 |
| Field goals | 9 |
| Field goal points | 27 |
| Field goal attempts | 15 |
| Longest field goal | 43 yds |
| Punt returns | 20 |
| Touchdowns on punt returns | 0 |
| TD punt return points | 0 |
| Punt return yards | 97 yds |
| Punt return average | 4.8 yds |
| Longest punt return | 22 yds |
| Kick returns | 52 |
| Touchdowns on kick returns | 1 |
| TD kick return points | 6 |
| Kick returns yards | 1073 yds |
| Kick returns average | 20.6 yds |
| Longest kick return | 96 yds |
| Point afters scored | 42 |
| Point after attempts | 43 |
| 2-point conversions | 3 |
| 2-point conversion rushes | 3 |
| 2-point conversion passes | 0 |
| Safeties | 2 |
| Points from safeties | 4 |
| Punts | 54 |
| Punting yards | 2058 yds |
| Punting average | 38.1 yds |
| Longest punt | 55 yds |
| Punts inside the 20 | 16 |
| Punts over 50 yards | 6 |
| Punts blocked | 0 |
| Punt touchbacks | 3 |
| Kickoffs | 66 |
| Kickoff yards | 3964 yds |
| Kickoff average | 60.1 yds |
| Kickoff touchbacks | 8 |
| Tackles by | 930 |
| Team tackles | 322 |
| Solo tackles | 608 |
| Sacks by | 19.0 |
| Fumbles caused by | 16 |
| Fumbles recovered | 14 |
| Interceptions by | 15 |
| Interception yards | 187 yds |
| Interception return average | 12.5 yds |
| Passes broken-up by | 38 |
| Blocked kicks | 2 |
| Fumbles by | 24 |
| Fumbles lost | 14 |

2013 Charlotte 49ers Football Individual Season Records
| Category | Record | Player |
|---|---|---|
| Touchdowns | 13 | Kalif Phillips |
| All-Purpose Yards | 727 yds | Austin Duke |
| Rushes | 133 | Alan Barnwell |
| Yards Rushing | 716 yds | Kalif Phillips |
| Touchdown Rushes | 12 | Kalif Phillips |
| Longest Rush | 70 yds | Alan Barnwell |
| Pass Attempts | 371 | Matt Johnson |
| Pass Completions | 223 | Matt Johnson |
| Yards Passing | 2581 yds | Matt Johnson |
| Touchdown Passes | 21 | Matt Johnson |
| Longest Pass | 53 yds | Matt Johnson |
| Receptions | 62 | Austin Duke |
| Yards Receiving | 727 yds | Austin Duke |
| Touchdown Receptions | 6 | Austin Duke |
| Longest Reception | 53 yds | Mikel Hunter |
| Field goals | 9 | Blake Brewer |
| Field Goal Points | 27 | Blake Brewer |
| Longest field goal | 43 yds | Blake Brewer |
| Longest field goal Attempt | 58 yds | Blake Brewer |
| Punts | 54 | Brandon Strupp |
| Punting Average | 38.1 yds | Brandon Strupp |
| Longest punt | 55 yds | Brandon Strupp |
| Punts Inside the 20 | 16 | Brandon Strupp |
| Punt returns | 15 | Mikel Hunter |
| Longest punt Return | 22 yds | Austin Duke |
| Kickoff returns | 23 | Mikel Hunter |
| Longest Kickoff Return | 96 yds | Mikel Hunter |
| Tackles | 85 | Martay Mattox |
| Solo Tackles | 49 | Martay Mattox |
| Sacks | 2.5 | Larry Ogunjobi |
| Interceptions | 3 | Terrance Winchester |
| Passes Broken-Up | 6 | Terrance Winchester |
| Fumble Recoveries | 3 | Caleb Clayton-Mobly |
| Blocked Kicks (tie) | 1 | Nico Alcalde |
| Blocked Kicks (tie) | 1 | Terrance Winchester |

=== Per-game records ===
2013 Charlotte 49ers Football Team Game Records
| Category | Record | Opponent | Date |
|---|---|---|---|
| Rushes | 52 | @Coastal Carolina | 11/2 |
| Yards Rushing | 439 yds | @ Morehead State | 11/23 |
| Yards per Rush | 10.5 yds | @ Morehead State | 11/23 |
| Touchdown Rushes | 6 | @ Morehead State | 11/23 |
| Pass Attempts | 56 | N.C. Central | 9/14 |
| Pass Completions | 38 | N.C. Central | 9/14 |
| Yards Passing (tie) | 342 yds | N.C. Central | 9/14 |
| Yards Passing (tie) | 342 yds | Gardner-Webb | 10/5 |
| Yards per Pass | 11.2 yds | @ Presbyterian | 9/28 |
| Touchdown Passes (tie) | 5 | Chowan | 9/7 |
| Touchdown Passes (tie) | 5 | Gardner-Webb | 10/5 |
| Total Plays | 106 | N.C. Central | 9/14 |
| Total offense | 586 yds | Gardner-Webb | 10/5 |
| Yards per Play | 11.2 yds | @ Morehead State | 11/23 |
| Points | 61 | @ Morehead State | 11/23 |
| Sacks By (tie) | 4 | Chowan | 9/7 |
| Sacks By (tie) | 4 | @ Morehead State | 11/23 |
| First downs (tie) | 31 | N.C. Central | 9/14 |
| First downs (tie) | 31 | Gardner-Webb | 10/5 |
| Penalties | 10 | Gardner-Webb | 10/5 |
| Penalty Yards | 86 yds | Gardner-Webb | 10/5 |
| Turnovers | 7 | N.C. Central | 9/14 |
| Interception By | 3 | Chowan | 9/7 |
| Punts | 8 | @ James Madison | 9/21 |
| Punting Average | 42.3 yds | Gardner-Webb | 10/5 |
| Longest punt (tie) | 55 yds | N.C. Central | 9/14 |
| Longest punt (tie) | 55 yds | @ James Madison | 9/21 |
| Longest punt (tie) | 55 yds | @ Presbyterian | 9/28 |
| Punts Inside the 20 (tie) | 3 | Chowan | 9/7 |
| Punts Inside the 20 (tie) | 3 | Wesley | 11/9 |
| Longest punt Return | 22 yds | @ Charleston Southern | 10/26 |

2013 Charlotte 49ers Football Individual Game Records
| Category | Record | Player | Opponent | Date |
|---|---|---|---|---|
| Touchdowns | 3 | Kalif Phillips | @ Morehead State | 11/23 |
| All-Purpose Yards | 201 yds | Mikel Hunter | @ Coastal Carolina | 11/2 |
| Rushes | 21 | Matt Johnson | @ James Madison | 9/21 |
| Yards Rushing | 132 yds | Kalif Phillips | @ Coastal Carolina | 11/2 |
| Touchdown Rushes | 3 | Kalif Phillips | @ Morehead State | 11/23 |
| Longest Rush | 70 yds | Alan Barnwell | @ Morehead State | 11/23 |
| Pass Attempts | 52 | Matt Johnson | N.C. Central | 9/14 |
| Pass Completions | 35 | Matt Johnson | N.C. Central | 9/14 |
| Yards Passing | 342 yds | Matt Johnson | Gardner-Webb | 10/5 |
| Touchdown Passes (tie) | 5 | Matt Johnson | Chowan | 9/7 |
| Touchdown Passes (tie) | 5 | Matt Johnson | Gardner-Webb | 10/5 |
| Longest Pass | 53 yds | Matt Johnson | @ Presbyterian | 9/28 |
| Receptions (tie) | 9 | Trent Bostick | Gardner-Webb | 10/5 |
| Receptions (tie) | 9 | Austin Duke | UNC Pembroke | 10/12 |
| Receptions (tie) | 9 | Mikel Hunter | UNC Pembroke | 10/12 |
| Yards Receiving | 158 yds | Austin Duke | UNC Pembroke | 10/12 |
| Touchdown Receptions (tie) | 2 | Austin Duke | Chowan | 9/7 |
| Touchdown Receptions (tie) | 2 | Austin Duke | Gardner-Webb | 10/5 |
| Touchdown Receptions (tie) | 2 | C.J. Crawford | Gardner-Webb | 10/5 |
| Touchdown Receptions (tie) | 2 | C.J. Crawford | UNC Pembroke | 10/12 |
| Longest Reception | 53 yds | Mikel Hunter | @ Presbyterian | 9/28 |
| Field goals | 3 | Blake Brewer | Campbell | 8/31 |
| Longest field goal | 43 yds | Blake Brewer | Gardner-Webb | 10/5 |
| Longest field goal Attempt | 58 yds | Blake Brewer | @ James Madison | 9/21 |
| Punts | 8 | Brandon Strupp | @ James Madison | 9/21 |
| Punting Average | 42.3 yds | Brandon Strupp | Gardner-Webb | 10/5 |
| Longest punt (tie) | 55 yds | Brandon Strupp | N.C. Central | 9/14 |
| Longest punt (tie) | 55 yds | Brandon Strupp | @ James Madison | 9/21 |
| Longest punt (tie) | 55 yds | Brandon Strupp | @ Presbyterian | 9/28 |
| Punts Inside the 20 (tie) | 3 | Brandon Strupp | Chowan | 9/7 |
| Punts Inside the 20 (tie) | 3 | Brandon Strupp | Wesley | 11/9 |
| Longest punt Return | 22 yds | Austin Duke | @ Charleston Southern | 10/26 |
| Longest Kickoff Return | 96 yds | Mikel Hunter | Chowan | 9/7 |
| Tackles | 18.0 | Marty Mattox | @ James Madison | 9/21 |
| Solo Tackles (tie) | 10 | Caleb Clayton-Mobly | Gardner-Webb | 10/5 |
| Solo Tackles (tie) | 10 | Micah Bryant | UNC Pembroke | 10/12 |
| Sacks | 2.0 | Mark Hogan | @ Morehead State | 11/23 |
| Tackles for Loss (tie) | 3.0 | G. Cunningham | Chowan | 9/7 |
| Tackles for Loss (tie) | 3.0 | Terry Caldwell | N.C. Central | 9/14 |
| Tackles for Loss (tie) | 3.0 | Nico Alcalde | @ Charleston Southern | 10/26 |
| Interceptions (tie) | 1 | Mark Hogan | Campbell | 8/31 |
| Interceptions (tie) | 1 | Terrence Winchester | Campbell | 8/31 |
| Interceptions (tie) | 1 | Mark Hogan | Chowan | 9/7 |
| Interceptions (tie) | 1 | Cortezz Nixon | Chowan | 9/7 |
| Interceptions (tie) | 1 | Micah Bryant | Chowan | 9/7 |
| Interceptions (tie) | 1 | Terrence Winchester | @ James Madison | 9/21 |
| Interceptions (tie) | 1 | G. Cunningham | @ James Madison | 9/21 |
| Interceptions (tie) | 1 | Desmond Cooper | @ Presbyterian | 9/28 |
| Interceptions (tie) | 1 | Tank Norman | @ Presbyterian | 9/28 |
| Interceptions (tie) | 1 | Martay Mattox | Gardner-Webb | 10/5 |
| Interceptions (tie) | 1 | Terrence Winchester | UNC Pembroke | 10/12 |
| Interceptions (tie) | 1 | Martay Mattox | Wesley | 11/9 |
| Interceptions (tie) | 1 | Brandon Banks | Wesley | 11/9 |
| Interceptions (tie) | 1 | Ardy Holmes | @ Morehead State | 11/23 |
| Interceptions (tie) | 1 | Caleb Clayton-Mobly | @ Morehead State | 11/23 |
