= 2013 Prairie View A&M Panthers football team =

American college football season

2013 Prairie View A&M Panthers football
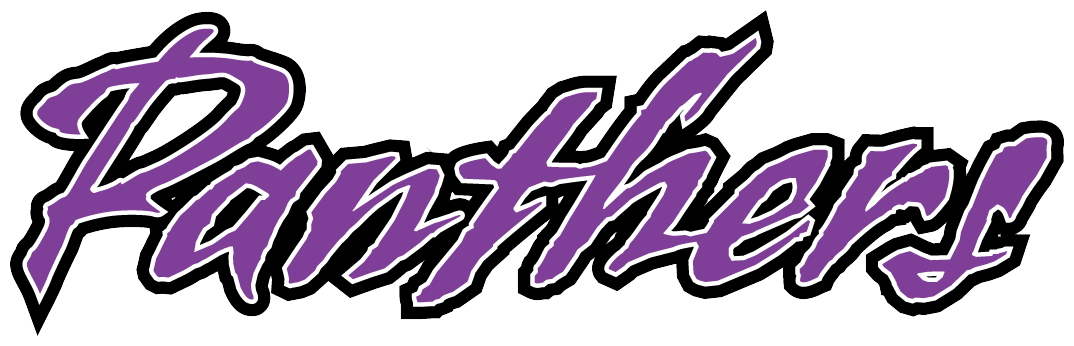
- Conference: Southwestern Athletic Conference
- West Division
- Record: 6–6 (4–4 SWAC)
- Head coach: Heishma Northern (3rd season)
- Offensive coordinator: Mark Orlando (3rd season)
- Defensive coordinator: Charles McMillian (1st season)
- Home stadium: Edward L. Blackshear Field

2013 Southwestern Athletic Conference football standings
| | Conf. | | | Overall |
| Team | W | | L | W | | L |
|---|---|---|---|---|---|---|
East Division
| Jackson State xy | 8 | – | 1 | 8 | – | 4 |
| Alcorn State | 7 | – | 2 | 9 | – | 3 |
| Alabama State * | 7 | – | 2 | 8 | – | 4 |
| Alabama A&M | 4 | – | 5 | 4 | – | 8 |
| Mississippi Valley State * | 2 | – | 7 | 2 | – | 9 |
West Division
| Southern xy$ | 7 | – | 2 | 9 | – | 4 |
| Prairie View A&M | 5 | – | 4 | 6 | – | 6 |
| Arkansas–Pine Bluff | 2 | – | 7 | 2 | – | 9 |
| Texas Southern * | 2 | – | 7 | 2 | – | 9 |
| Grambling State | 1 | – | 8 | 1 | – | 11 |
Championship: Southern 34, Jackson State 27 ^{2OT}
$ – Conference champion; x – Division champion/co-champions; y – Championship game participant; * – ineligible for postseason

The 2013 Prairie View A&M Panthers football team represented Prairie View A&M University in the 2013 NCAA Division I FCS football season. The Panthers were led by third year head coach Heishma Northern and played their home games at Edward L. Blackshear Field. They were a member of the West Division of the Southwestern Athletic Conference (SWAC).

== Media ==
All Prairie View A&M games will be carried live on KPVU 91.3 FM.

== Schedule ==
| Date | Time | Opponent | Site | TV | Result | Attendance |
|---|---|---|---|---|---|---|
| August 31 | 7:00 pm | at Texas Southern | BBVA Compass Stadium; Houston, TX (Labor Day Classic) | KHOU-DT2 | W 37–13 | 18,361 |
| September 7 | 6:00 pm | at Texas State* | Bobcat Stadium; San Marcos, TX | ESPN3 | L 3–28 | 20,136 |
| September 14 | 6:00 pm | at Southern | Ace W. Mumford Stadium; Baton Rouge, LA | CST^ | L 59–62 ^{2OT} | 14,586 |
| September 21 | 6:00 pm | Alabama A&M | Edward L. Blackshear Field; Prairie View, TX | | W 28–26 | 4,712 |
| September 28 | 6:00 pm | at Stephen F. Austin* | Homer Bryce Stadium; Nacogdoches, TX | | W 56–48 | 12,329 |
| October 5 | 4:30 pm | vs. Grambling State | Cotton Bowl; Dallas, TX (State Fair Classic) | | W 31–3 | 27,745 |
| October 12 | 1:00 pm | at Alabama State | The New ASU Stadium; Montgomery, AL | | L 42–48 ^{OT} | 1,123 |
| October 19 | 2:00 pm | Mississippi Valley State^{†} | Edward L. Blackshear Field; Prairie View, TX | CSS | W 51–14 | 12,000 |
| October 26 | 4:00 pm | vs. Jackson State | Independence Stadium; Shreveport, LA (Shreveport Classic) | | L 38–51 | 5,116 |
| November 7 | 6:30 pm | at Alcorn State | Casem-Spinks Stadium; Lorman, MS | | L 35–50 | 4,517 |
| November 16 | 1:00 pm | Abilene Christian* | Edward L. Blackshear Field; Prairie View, TX | | L 45–65 | 3,156 |
| November 23 | 1:00 pm | Arkansas–Pine Bluff | Edward L. Blackshear Field; Prairie View, TX | | W 43–23 | 1,658 |
*Non-conference game; ^{†}Homecoming; All times are in Central time

^Game aired on a tape delayed basis

== Game summaries ==
=== Texas Southern ===
Prairie View A&M at Texas Southern

| Team | 1 | 2 | 3 | 4 | Total |
|---|---|---|---|---|---|
| • Panthers | 13 | 7 | 7 | 10 | 37 |
| Tigers | 10 | 3 | 0 | 0 | 13 |

- Date: August 31
- Location: BBVA Compass Stadium
  Houston, TX
- Game start: 7:05 PM CST
- Elapsed time: 3:10
- Game attendance: 18,361
- Game weather: 96 °F (36 °C), Clear & Humid, winds @ 5mph
- Referee: Eddie Kelley
- TV announcers (KHOU-DT2): Nick Strong and Dejuan Fulgham

Scoring summary
| 1 | 12:20 | PVAM | Johnta Hebert 2-yard touchdown run, Amir Smith rush failed | PVAM 6–0 |
| 1 | 10:21 | TXSOFB | Dedric Shipman 30-yard touchdown pass from Homer Causey, Eric Medina kick good | TXSOFB 7–6 |
| 1 | 7:13 | PVAM | De'Auntre Smiley 2-yard touchdown run, Christopher Barrick kick good | PVAM 13–7 |
| 1 | 3:42 | TXSOFB | Eric Medina 18-yard Field Goal | PVAM 13–10 |
| 2 | 8:50 | TXSOFB | Eric Medina 34-yard Field Goal | Tied 13–13 |
| 2 | 0:54 | PVAM | Courtney Brown 4-yard touchdown run, Christopher Barrick kick good | PVAM 20–13 |
| 3 | 10:39 | PVAM | Greg Thurmond 29-yard touchdown pass from Jerry Lovelock, Christopher Barrick kick good | PVAM 27–13 |
| 4 | 8:50 | PVAM | Christopher Barrick 37-yard Field Goal | PVAM 30–13 |
| 4 | 3:50 | PVAM | Courtney Brown 8-yard touchdown run, Christopher Barrick kick good | PVAM 37–13 |

=== Texas State ===
Prairie View A&M at Texas State

| Team | 1 | 2 | 3 | 4 | Total |
|---|---|---|---|---|---|
| Panthers | 0 | 0 | 3 | 0 | 3 |
| • Bobcats | 14 | 7 | 7 | 0 | 28 |

- Date: September 7
- Location: Bobcat Stadium
  San Marcos, TX
- Game start: 6:05 PM CST
- Elapsed time: 2:58
- Game attendance: 20,136
- Game weather: 83 °F (28 °C), Clear & Humid, winds @ 5mph
- Referee: Jeff Hilyer
- TV announcers (ESPN3): Brock Bowling & Jay Taylor

Scoring summary
| 1 | 9:49 | TXST | Chris Nutall 4-yard touchdown run, Will Johnson kick good | TXST 7–0 |
| 1 | 2:19 | TXST | Robert Lowe 1-yard touchdown run, Will Johnson kick good | TXST 14–0 |
| 2 | 5:06 | TXST | Chris Nutakk 77-yard touchdown run, Will Johnson kick good | TXST 21–0 |
| 3 | 5:29 | PVAM | Christopher Barrick 47-yard Field Goal | TXST 21–3 |
| 3 | 0:58 | TXST | Terrence Franks 8-yard touchdown run, Will Johnson kick good | TXST 28–3 |

=== Southern ===
Prairie View A&M vs. Southern

| Team | 1 | 2 | 3 | 4 | OT | Total |
|---|---|---|---|---|---|---|
| Panthers | 7 | 21 | 7 | 14 | 10 | 59 |
| • Jaguars | 7 | 6 | 7 | 29 | 13 | 62 |

- Date: September 14
- Location: Ace W. Mumford Stadium
  Baton Rouge, LA
- Game start: 6:00 PM CST
- Elapsed time: 3:35
- Game attendance: 14,586
- Game weather: 87 °F (31 °C), Clear, no wind
- Referee: Anthony Johnson
- TV announcers (CST): Todd Kalas, James Verrett & Taylor Halsey

Scoring summary
| 1 | 11:59 | PVAM | Johnta' Hebert 3-yard touchdown run, Christopher Barrick kick good | PVAM 7–0 |
| 1 | 8:05 | SUBR | Mike Jones 38-yard touchdown pass from Dray Joseph, Greg Pittman kick good | Tied 7–7 |
| 2 | 12:09 | PVAM | Johnta' Hebert 2-yard touchdown run, Christopher Barrick kick good | PVAM 14–7 |
| 2 | 6:45 | PVAM | Gabe Dunlap 6-yard touchdown pass from Jerry Lovelock, Christopher Barrick kick good | PVAM 21–7 |
| 2 | 2:47 | SUBR | Lenard Tillery 33-yard touchdown run, Greg Pittman kick failed | PVAM 21–13 |
| 2 | 0:15 | PVAM | Courtney Brown 1-yard touchdown run, Christopher Barrick kick good | PVAM 28–13 |
| 3 | 1:47 | PVAM | Courtney Brown 4-yard touchdown run, Christopher Barrick kick good | PVAM 35–13 |
| 3 | 0:00 | SUBR | Lenard Tillery 2-yard touchdown run, Greg Pittman kick good | PVAM 35–20 |
| 4 | 11:12 | SUBR | Lenard Tillery 13-yard touchdown run, Greg Pittman kick good | PVAM 35–27 |
| 4 | 7:21 | SUBR | Lee Doss 25-yard touchdown pass from Dray Joseph, Bradley Coleman 2-point reception pass from Dray Joseph | Tied 35–35 |
| 4 | 5:44 | PVAM | Jerry Lovelocke 2-yard touchdown run, Christopher Barrick kick good | PVAM 42–35 |
| 4 | 4:13 | SUBR | Lee Doss 7-yard touchdown pass from Dray Joseph, Bradley Coleman kick good | Tied 42–42 |
| 4 | 2:40 | PVAM | Johnta' Hebert 41-yard touchdown run, Christopher Barrick kick good | PVAM 49–42 |
| 4 | 0:50 | SUBR | Willie Quinn 11-yard touchdown pass from Dray Joseph, Bradley Coleman kick good | Tied 49–49 |
| OT | | SUBR | Nico Talbert 10-yard touchdown pass from Dray Joseph, Bradley Coleman kick good | SUBR 56–49 |
| OT | | PVAM | Courtney Brown 12-yard touchdown run, Christopher Barrick kick good | Tied 56–56 |
| 2OT | | PVAM | Christopher Barrick 25-yard Field Goal | PVAM 59–56 |
| 2OT | | SUBR | Lee Doss 24-yard touchdown pas from Dray Joseph | SUBR 62–59 |

=== Alabama A&M ===
Alabama A&M at Prairie View A&M

| Team | 1 | 2 | 3 | 4 | Total |
|---|---|---|---|---|---|
| Bulldogs | 12 | 0 | 0 | 14 | 26 |
| • Panthers | 0 | 0 | 21 | 7 | 28 |

- Date: September 21
- Location: Edward L. Blackshear Field
  Prairie View, TX
- Game start: 6:00 PM CST
- Elapsed time: 3:00
- Game attendance: 4,712
- Game weather: 84 °F (29 °C), Sunny, wind @ 7mph
- Referee: Michael Marsh
- TV announcers (Prairie View A&M Showcase): Leonard Moon

Scoring summary
| 1 | 2:48 | AAMU | Barringt Scott 15-yard touchdown run, Cesar Ramon kick failed | AAMU 6–0 |
| 1 | 0:30 | AAMU | Brand Eldemire 67-yard touchdown run, Cesar Ramon kick failed | AAMU 12–0 |
| 3 | 11:37 | PVAM | De'Auntre Smiley 1-yard touchdown run, Christopher Barrick kick good | AAMU 12–7 |
| 3 | 8:24 | PVAM | De'Auntre Smiley 37-yard touchdown run, Christopher Barrick kick good | PVAM 14–12 |
| 3 | 2:54 | PVAM | Courtney Brown 26-yard touchdown pass from Jerry Lovelock, Christopher Barrick kick good | PVAM 21–12 |
| 4 | 13:00 | AAMU | Jonathan Dorsey 13-yard touchdown pass from Jaymason Lee, Jordan Puente kick good | PVAM 21–19 |
| 4 | 9:57 | PVAM | Gabe Dunlap 5-yard touchdown pass from Jerry Lovelock, Christopher Barrick kick good | PVAM 28–19 |
| 4 | 6:35 | AAMU | Demario Ross 9-yard touchdown pass from Jaymason Lee, Jordan Puente kick good | PVAM 28–26 |

=== Stephen F. Austin ===
Prairie View A&M at Stephen F. Austin

| Team | 1 | 2 | 3 | 4 | Total |
|---|---|---|---|---|---|
| • Panthers | 21 | 14 | 14 | 7 | 56 |
| Lumberjacks | 14 | 17 | 3 | 14 | 48 |

- Date: September 21
- Location: Homer Bryce Stadium
  Nacogdoches, TX
- Game start: 6:00 PM CST
- Elapsed time: 3:24
- Game attendance: 12,329
- Game weather: 81 °F (27 °C), Overcast
- Referee: Reggie Smith

Scoring summary
| 1 | 13:34 | SFA | Gus Johnson 1-yard touchdown run, Jordan Wiggs kick good | SFA 7–0 |
| 1 | 10:53 | SFA | Joshawa West 1-yard touchdown run, Jordan Wiggs kick good | SFA 14–0 |
| 1 | 8:44 | PVAM | Gabe Dunlap 13-yard touchdown pass from Jerry Lovelock, Christopher Barrick kick good | SFA 14–7 |
| 1 | 3:42 | PVAM | Patrick Gant 3-yard touchdown pass from Jerry Lovelock, Christopher Barrick kick good | Tied 14–14 |
| 1 | 0:07 | PVAM | Jerry Lovelock 4-yard touchdown run, Christopher Barrick kick good | PVAM 21–14 |
| 2 | 11:06 | PVAM | Deandre Cooper 39-yard touchdown pass from Jerry Lovelock, Christopher Barrick kick good | PVAM 28–14 |
| 2 | 5:32 | SFA | Marquis Mosley 7-yard touchdown pass from Brady Attaway, Jordan Wiggs kick good | PVAM 28–21 |
| 2 | 2:50 | SFA | Jordan Wiggs 28-yard Field Goal | PVAM 28–24 |
| 2 | 1:25 | SFA | DJ Ward 80-yard touchdown pass from Brady Attaway, Jordan Wiggs kick good | SFA 31–28 |
| 2 | 0:11 | PVAM | Patrick Gant 6-yard touchdown pass from Jerry Lovelock, Christopher Barrick kick good | PVAM 35–31 |
| 3 | 9:56 | PVAM | Jerry Lovelock 3-yard touchdown run, Christopher Barrick kick good | Tied 42–31 |
| 3 | 6:51 | SFA | Jordan Wiggs 30-yard Field Goal | PVAM 42–34 |
| 3 | 3:16 | PVAM | Jerry Lovelock 4-yard touchdown run, Christopher Barrick kick good | PVAM 49–34 |
| 4 | 6:33 | SFA | Aaron Thomas 76-yard touchdown pass from Brady Attaway, Jordan Wiggs kick good | PVAM 49–41 |
| 4 | 2:52 | PVAM | Courtney Brown 41-yard touchdown run, Christopher Barrick kick good | PVAM 56–41 |
| 4 | 1:43 | SFA | Mike Brooks 26-yard touchdown pass from Brady Attaway, Jordan Wiggs kick good | PVAM 56–48 |

=== Grambling State ===
Grambling State vs. Prairie View A&M

| Team | 1 | 2 | 3 | 4 | Total |
|---|---|---|---|---|---|
| Tigers | 0 | 3 | 0 | 0 | 3 |
| • Panthers | 10 | 0 | 21 | 0 | 31 |

- Date: October 5
- Location: Cotton Bowl
  Dallas, TX
- Game start: 4:30 PM CST
- Elapsed time: 3:00
- Game attendance: 27,745
- Game weather: 54 °F (12 °C), Cold, Rainy & Windy, wind NNW @ 18mph
- Referee: Trennis Livings

Scoring summary
| 1 | 13:34 | PVAM | Christopher Barrick 23-yard Field Goal | PVAM 3–0 |
| 1 | 6:45 | PVAM | Courtney Brown 12-yard touchdown pass from Jerry Lovelock, Christopher Barrick kick good | PVAM 10–0 |
| 2 | 14:40 | GRAM | Johnathan Wallace 33-yard Field Goal | PVAM 10–3 |
| 3 | 10:18 | PVAM | Deandre Cooper 23-yard touchdown pass from Jerry Lovelock, Christopher Barrick kick good | PVAM 17–3 |
| 3 | 9:25 | PVAM | Jamespaul Bryant 64-yard fumble return for a touchdown, Christopher Barrick kick good | PVAM 24–3 |
| 3 | 6:49 | PVAM | Jerry Lovelock 1-yard touchdown run, Christopher Barrick kick good | PVAM 31–3 |

=== Alabama State ===
Prairie View A&M at Alabama State

| Team | 1 | 2 | 3 | 4 | OT | Total |
|---|---|---|---|---|---|---|
| Panthers | 14 | 7 | 7 | 14 | 0 | 42 |
| • Hornets | 14 | 7 | 14 | 7 | 6 | 48 |

- Date: October 12
- Location: The New ASU Stadium
  Montgomery, AL
- Game start: 1:00 PM CST
- Elapsed time: 3:30
- Game attendance: 11,825
- Game weather: 72 °F (22 °C), Mostly Sunny
- Referee: George McCullum

Scoring summary
| 1 | 10:53 | PVAM | Jerry Lovelock 1-yard touchdown run, Christopher Barrick kick good | PVAM 7–0 |
| 1 | 9:50 | ALST | Isaiah Crowell 33-yard touchdown run, Alex Louthan kick good | Tied 7–7 |
| 1 | 9:31 | PVAM | Patrick Gant 73-yard touchdown pass from Jerry Lovelock, Christopher Barrick kick good | PVAM 14–7 |
| 1 | 4:28 | ALST | Marcus Gamble 7-yard touchdown pass from Arsenio Favor, Alex Louthan kick good | Tied 14–14 |
| 2 | 7:53 | ALST | Earl Lucas 24-yard touchdown pass from Quinten Toppings, Alex Louthan kick good | ALST 21–14 |
| 2 | 4:14 | PVAM | Courtney Brown 1-yard touchdown run, Christopher Barrick kick good | Tied 21–21 |
| 3 | 11:48 | ALST | Malcolm Cyrus 80-yard touchdown run, Alex Louthan kick good | ALST 28–21 |
| 3 | 8:02 | ALST | Isaiah Crowell 1-yard touchdown run, Alex Louthan kick good | ALST 35–21 |
| 3 | 0:07 | PVAM | Courtney Brown 6-yard touchdown pass from Jerry Lovelock, Christopher Barrick kick good | ALST 35–28 |
| 4 | 9:26 | PVAM | Jacoby Anderson 10-yard touchdown pass from Jerry Lovelock, Christopher Barrick kick good | Tied 35–35 |
| 4 | 7:48 | ALST | Justin Mitchell 40-yard fumble returned for a touchdown, Alex Louthan kick good | ALST 42–35 |
| 4 | 0:20 | PVAM | Courtney Brown 4-yard touchdown pass from Jerry Lovelock, Christopher Barrick kick good | Tied 42–42 |
| OT | | ALST | Malcolm Cyrus 7-yard touchdown run | ALST 48–42 |

=== Mississippi Valley State ===
Mississippi Valley State at Prairie View A&M

| Team | 1 | 2 | 3 | 4 | Total |
|---|---|---|---|---|---|
| Delta Devils | 0 | 7 | 0 | 7 | 14 |
| • Panthers | 7 | 21 | 16 | 7 | 51 |

- Date: October 19
- Location: Edward L. Blackshear Field
  Prairie View, TX

=== Jackson State ===
Prairie View A&M vs. Jackson State

| Team | 1 | 2 | 3 | 4 | Total |
|---|---|---|---|---|---|
| Panthers | 10 | 7 | 21 | 0 | 38 |
| • Tigers | 3 | 21 | 14 | 13 | 51 |

- Date: October 26
- Location: Independence Stadium
  Shreveport, LA

=== Alcorn State ===
Prairie View A&M at Alcorn State

| Team | 1 | 2 | 3 | 4 | Total |
|---|---|---|---|---|---|
| Panthers | 7 | 7 | 7 | 14 | 35 |
| • Braves | 7 | 27 | 6 | 10 | 50 |

- Date: November 7
- Location: Jack Spinks Stadium
  Lorman, MS

=== Abilene Christian ===
Abilene Christian at Prairie View A&M

| Team | 1 | 2 | 3 | 4 | Total |
|---|---|---|---|---|---|
| Wildcats | 0 | 0 | 0 | 0 | 0 |
| Panthers | 0 | 0 | 0 | 0 | 0 |

- Date: November 10
- Location: Edward L. Blackshear Field
  Prairie View, TX

=== Arkansas–Pine Bluff ===
Arkansas–Pine Bluff at Prairie View A&M

| Team | 1 | 2 | 3 | 4 | Total |
|---|---|---|---|---|---|
| Golden Lions | 0 | 0 | 0 | 0 | 0 |
| Panthers | 0 | 0 | 0 | 0 | 0 |

- Date: November 23
- Location: Edward L. Blackshear Field
  Prairie View, TX
