= Isaiah Crowell =

American football player (born 1993)

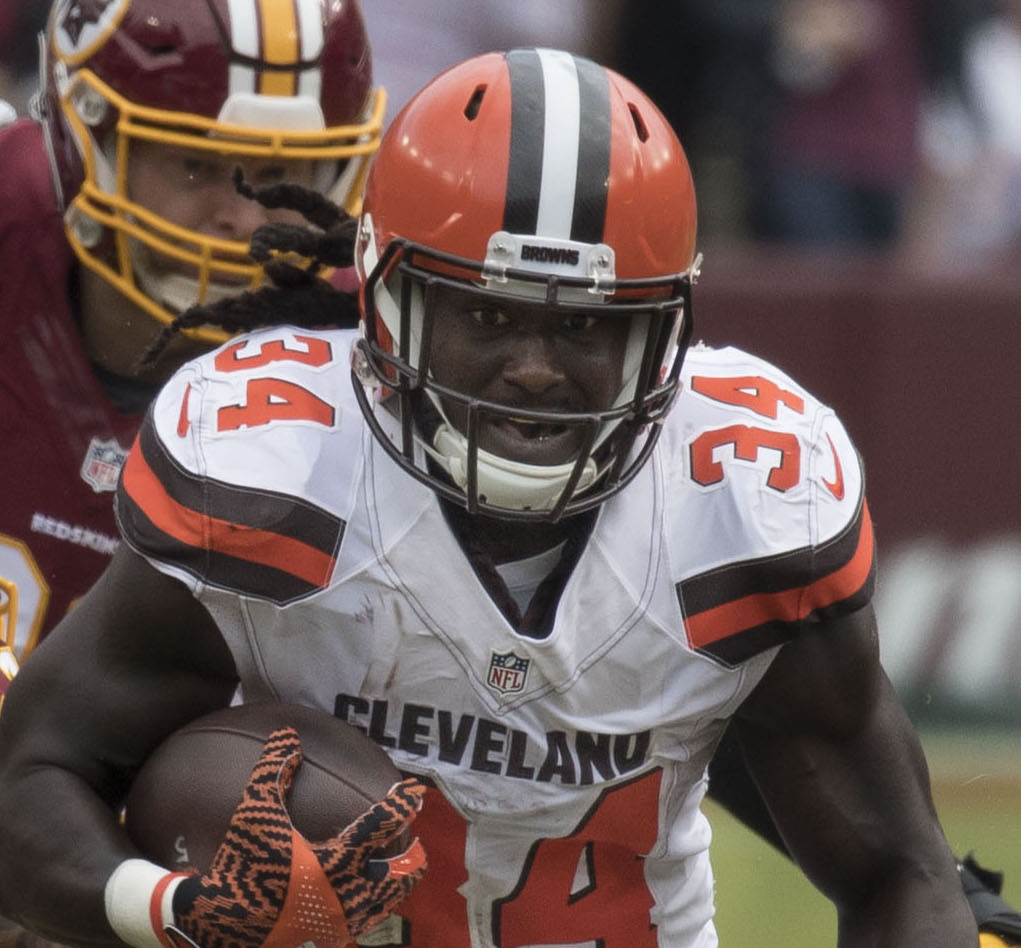
- Crowell with the Cleveland Browns in 2016

No. 20, 34
- Position: Running back

Personal information
- Born: January 8, 1993 (age 33); Columbus, Georgia, U.S.
- Listed height: 5 ft 11 in (1.80 m)
- Listed weight: 225 lb (102 kg)

Career information
- High school: Carver (Columbus)
- College: Georgia (2011); Alabama State (2012–2013)
- NFL draft: 2014: undrafted

Career history
- Cleveland Browns (2014–2017); New York Jets (2018); Oakland Raiders (2019)

Awards and highlights
- 2× First-team All-SWAC (2012, 2013); SWAC Newcomer of the Year (2012); SEC Freshman of the Year (2011)

Career NFL statistics
- Rushing yards: 3,803
- Rushing average: 4.3
- Rushing touchdowns: 27
- Receptions: 117
- Receiving yards: 922
- Receiving touchdowns: 1
- Stats at Pro Football Reference

Isaiah Hassan Crowell (/kroʊˈwɛl/ kroh-WEL; born January 8, 1993) is an American former professional football player who was a running back in the National Football League (NFL). He played college football for the Georgia Bulldogs and Alabama State Hornets. Crowell was signed by the Cleveland Browns as an undrafted free agent in 2014.

== Early life ==
Crowell attended George Washington Carver High School in Columbus, Georgia, where he played football and ran track. During his high school career, he rushed for 4,872 yards with 61 touchdowns on 429 carries for the Tigers football team. He was considered the best running back recruit by Scout.com and the fourth-best by Rivals.com.

In addition to football, Crowell was a standout track & field athlete. He lettered all four years competing as a sprinter and long-distance runner. He won the 100-meter dash event at the 2009 MCSD Meet, recording a career-best time of 10.91 seconds. He posted career-bests of 22.38 in the 200m, 52.53 in the 400m, and 12:36.84 in the 3200m.

== College career ==
=== University of Georgia ===
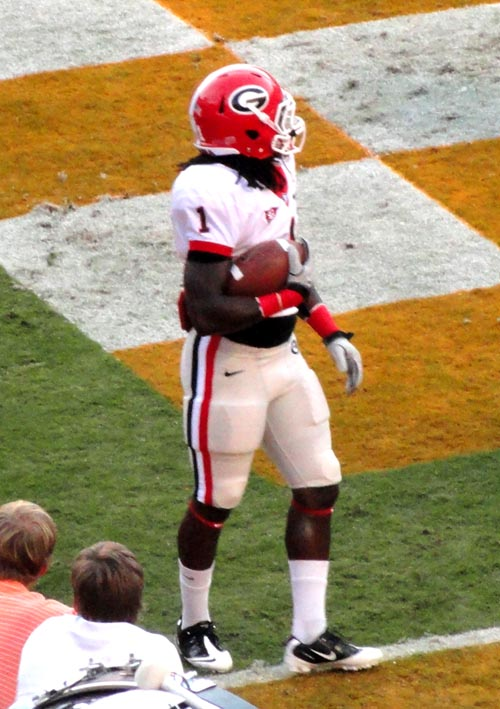
Crowell at Neyland Stadium in 2011 while playing for the Georgia Bulldogs

Starting running back Washaun Ealey's transferring to Jacksonville State in the spring led to a vacancy at that position for the 2011 season at the University of Georgia. Second string running back Caleb King was next in line to take over as the team's starting running back, but the senior was declared academically ineligible on July 8. The position was wide open during football practices in August and leading up to Georgia's opening game at the Georgia Dome in Atlanta against Boise State on September 3. He earned the starting running back job for the Bulldogs as a freshman for their September 17 game against Coastal Carolina. However, it was his fine performance against South Carolina on September 10 that created Crowell's chance to take over the starting role as tailback as the 6–0, 215-pound true freshman scored two touchdowns while rushing 16 times for 118 yards and catching two passes for 40 yards against the Gamecocks in a 45–42 heartbreaking loss to Coach Steve Spurrier's South Carolina Gamecocks. Against Coastal Carolina, Crowell had 16 rushes for 86 yards and highlighted his performance with a 27-yard touchdown run to open the game as Georgia went on to defeat the Chanticleers 59–0. In addition, he had a 12-yard reception in the contest.

During the season, Crowell had some breakout performances, such as his 30 carries, 147 yard-outing against Ole Miss on September 24 in Oxford, Mississippi, as Georgia won 27–13. Crowell followed up the Ole Miss performance with 104 yards rushing against Mississippi State on October 1 as Georgia defeated the MSU Bulldogs, 24–10. He apparently had scored on a 49-yard touchdown run in the contest, but that play was cut short to only 14 yards after the line judge had determined that Crowell's shoe had just touched the sideline — it appeared to be very close according to video replay. On October 8 at Knoxville, Tennessee, Crowell ran into a stout Tennessee defense as he scored two touchdowns but was contained to 19 rushes for 58 yards and two receptions for five yards. Georgia defeated Tennessee 20–12.

Later in the season on October 29, Crowell helped Georgia win a narrow victory against SEC East rival Florida 24–20 as the true freshman ran with the football 18 times for 81 yards. Crowell had another breakout performance – this one against Auburn as he rushed 24 times for 132 yards and a touchdown on November 12 as Georgia won convincingly by a score of 45–7. He also caught a pass for one yard against the Tigers.

An injury slowed Crowell down near the end of the regular season as he suffered a high ankle sprain on November 19 against Kentucky as the running back finished with two rushes for 11 yards. Georgia defeated the Wildcats 19–10. The injury caused Crowell to miss the regular-season finale against in-state rival Georgia Tech on November 26.

Georgia played nationally ranked #1 LSU (12–0) in the SEC Championship Game on December 3 as Crowell and the Bulldogs would go on to take a lead and go into the locker room at halftime up 10–7. He struggled to get on track against the tough Tiger defense as Crowell finished with 10 rushes for 15 yards and a catch for negative three yards. LSU, led by defensive back-punt returner Tyrann Mathieu, exploded in the second half as the Tigers won the contest, 42–10.

Crowell finished the season with 185 carries for 850 rushing yards and five touchdowns. He also had eight receptions for 59 yards and a touchdown in 12 games. On December 5, Crowell was named freshman of the year by The Associated Press. The Georgia Bulldogs were invited to play #12 Michigan State (10–3) in the Outback Bowl in Tampa, Florida, on January 2. Georgia lost the game in the third overtime 33–30 and fell to a 10–4 record.

On June 29, 2012, Crowell was arrested on possession of a weapon in a school zone, possession of a firearm with an altered identification, and carrying a concealed firearm. Crowell was dismissed from the University of Georgia football team due to his arrest and his constant disciplinary problems—including failing a drug test.

=== Alabama State ===
==== 2012 season ====
Crowell enrolled at Alabama State in July 2012.

During the 2012 season, Crowell ran the ball well, having several good games for Alabama State, including the breakout performance he displayed on September 29 by rushing for 127 yards, which included a 61-yard touchdown run in a 54–14 win against Alcorn State. He finished the 2012 season as the Hornets' leading rusher while helping Alabama State to a 7–4 record.

==== 2013 season ====
In the 2013 season, Crowell helped lead Alabama State to an 8–4 record, good for third place in the SWAC East Division. He finished the year with 1,121 yards rushing and 15 touchdowns. His best game that season came against Jackson State, where he rushed 18 times for 179 yards (averaging 9.9 yards a carry) and a touchdown. However, Alabama State lost to the Jackson State Tigers by a score of 30–23. Crowell had five 100-yard rushing games in the 2013 season. After the 2013 season, Crowell declared for the 2014 NFL draft. He finished 20th in the 2013 Walter Payton Award Voting.

== Professional career ==
Pre-draft measurables
Height	Weight	Arm length	Hand span	40-yard dash	10-yard split	20-yard split	20-yard shuttle	Three-cone drill	Vertical jump	Broad jump	Bench press
5 ft 11 in (1.80 m)	224 lb (102 kg)	31 3/8 in (0.80 m)	9 1/4 in (0.23 m)	4.57 s	1.55 s	2.65 s	4.56 s	7.28 s	38 in (0.97 m)	9 ft 9 in (2.97 m)	23 reps
All values from NFL Scouting Combine, except 20-yard shuttle and 3 cone drill.

=== Cleveland Browns ===
==== 2014 season ====
Despite being projected to be selected as high as the fourth round, Crowell did not get drafted. On May 10, 2014, he signed as an undrafted free agent with the Cleveland Browns and was given a $10,500 signing bonus immediately.

As a rookie, Crowell shared backfield carries with Terrance West and Ben Tate. In Week 1, Crowell made his NFL debut, running for 32 yards on five carries and two touchdowns in a 30–27 loss to the Pittsburgh Steelers. In Week 3, Crowell scored his third touchdown of the season against the Baltimore Ravens. Crowell and rookie running back Terrence West each scored a rushing touchdown, the first time two Browns rookies had done that in a single game since 1979, which was when Dino Hall and Pat Moriarty accomplished the feat. On October 12, 2014, Crowell ran for 77 yards on 11 carries and a touchdown against the Pittsburgh Steelers. Crowell played in all 16 games and started four. He finished his rookie season with 607 rushing yards on 148 attempts and eight touchdowns plus nine receptions for 87 yards. Among rookies, Crowell ranks fifth in rushing yards, only one of nine rookies to break 500 yards, and one of five to break 600 yards. Crowell was ranked second in rushing touchdowns among rookies, just behind Cincinnati Bengals' running back Jeremy Hill.

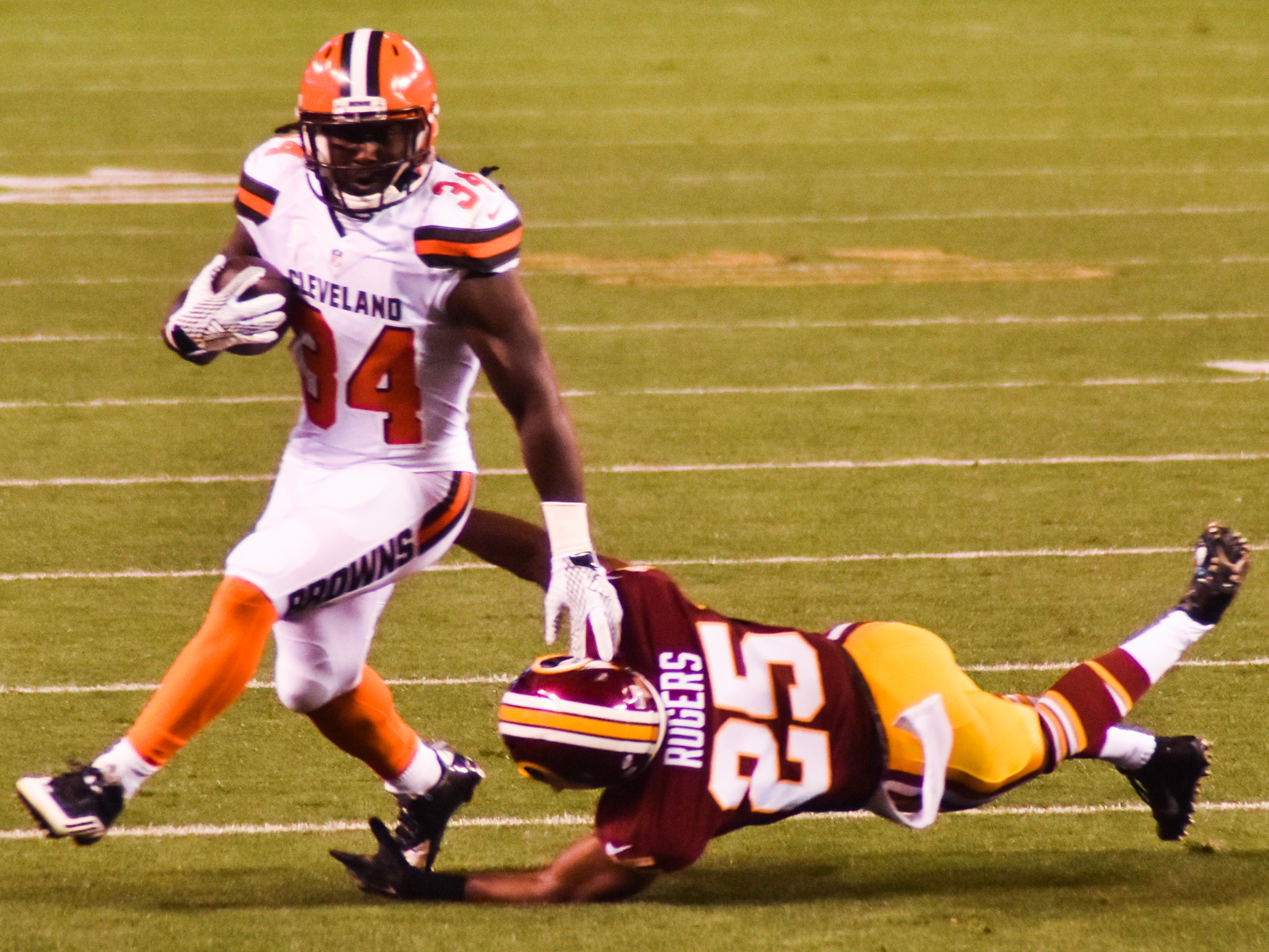
Crowell with the Browns in 2015

==== 2015 season ====
In the 2015 season, Crowell and Duke Johnson combined for a majority of the backfield carries for the Browns. In Week 4, Crowell ran for 63 yards on 12 carries against the San Diego Chargers, including a 32-yard run. Crowell recorded a career-high 62 receiving yards, including a career-long 53-yard catch. Crowell's 125 total yards and Johnson's 116 total yards made this the first time two Browns running backs earned more than 100 total yards in a single game since 2004, when Lee Suggs recorded 119 yards and William Green recorded 115 in the same game. In Week 5, Crowell scored his first touchdown reception of his career against the Baltimore Ravens. In Week 14, Crowell ran for 145 yards on 20 carries and two touchdowns against the San Francisco 49ers. Included, Crowell had a 50-yard run. Crowell finished the 2015 season with 706 rushing yards on 185 carries with four touchdowns, averaging 3.8 yards a carry. He played in all 16 games of the season and was the starting running back in nine of those games.

==== 2016 season ====
In the 2016 season, Crowell led the Browns in rushing attempts, rushing yards, and rushing touchdowns. In Week 2, versus the Baltimore Ravens, Crowell recorded a career-long 85-yard touchdown run. The run was the second-longest rushing play in franchise history, behind Bobby Mitchell's 90-yard run in 1959. He finished the game with 133 yards on 18 carries and a touchdown, averaging 7.4 yards per carry. In Week 4, Crowell ran for 112 yards on 16 carries and a touchdown against the Washington Redskins. Crowell's 386 yards were the most by a Brown through the first four games of a season since Jim Brown recorded 476 yards in 1965. In Week 14, against the Cincinnati Bengals, he had 113 rushing yards in the 23–10 loss. To close out the regular season, he had a season-high 152 rushing yards in a 27–24 loss to the Pittsburgh Steelers. Crowell finished the 2016 season with a career-high 952 rushing yards and 319 receiving yards. His 4.8 yards per carry ranked fifteenth among NFL running backs in the 2016 season.

==== 2017 season ====
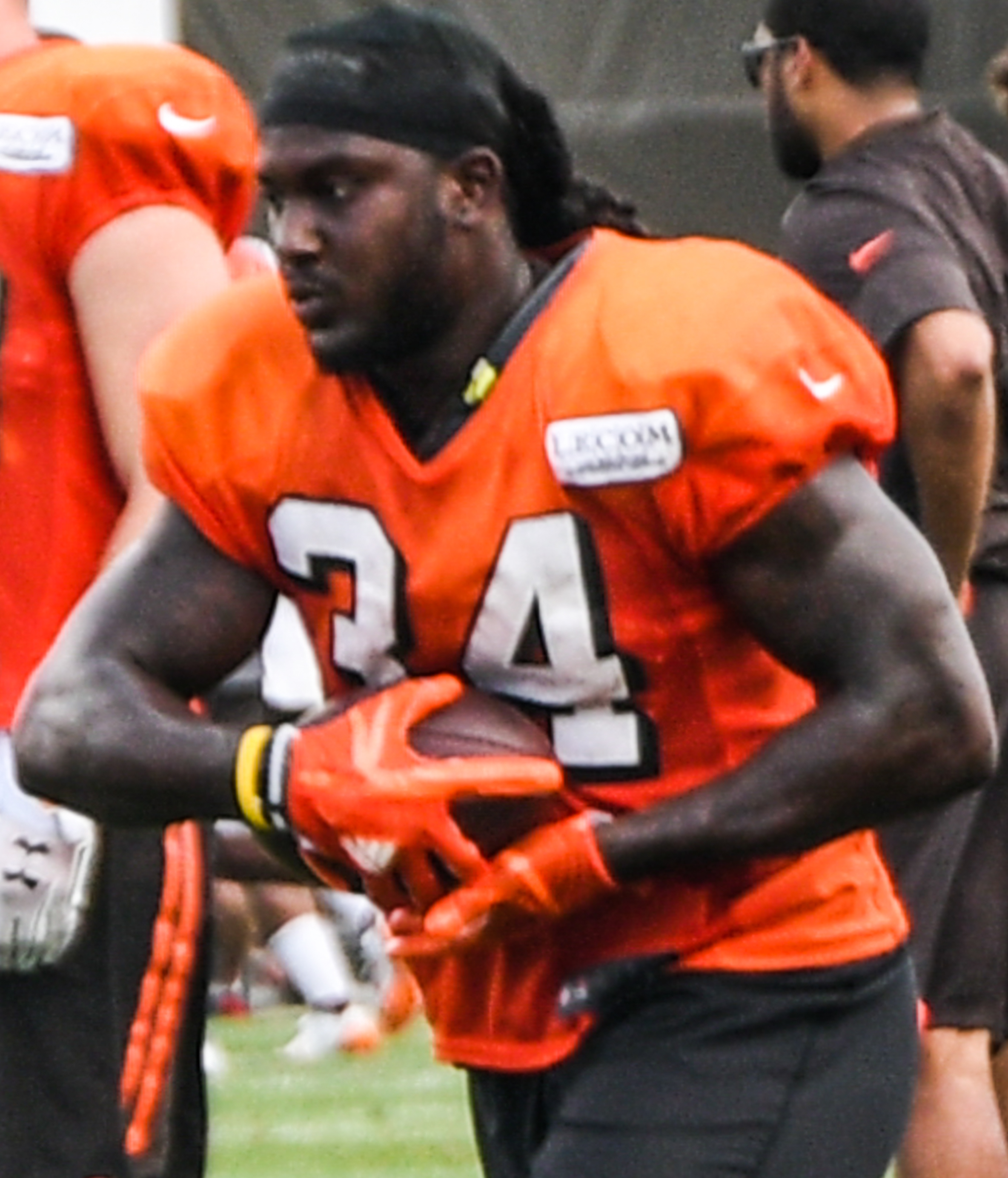
Crowell in 2017

On February 28, 2017, the Browns placed a second-round tender on Crowell, keeping him in Cleveland through 2017. Crowell got a majority of the backfield carries in 2017.

In Week 8, against the Minnesota Vikings, Crowell had 118 scrimmage yards in the 33–16 loss. In Week 14 in an overtime loss to the Green Bay Packers, he finished with a season-high 121 rushing yards. Overall, in the 2017 season, he finished with 853 rushing yards, two rushing touchdowns, 28 receptions, and 182 receiving yards as the Browns recorded the second 0–16 season in NFL history.

=== New York Jets ===
On March 14, 2018, Crowell signed a three-year deal worth $12 million with the New York Jets.

During Monday Night Football against the Detroit Lions in Week 1, Crowell finished with 102 rushing yards and two rushing touchdowns, of which one was a 62-yard run, as the Jets won 48–17. Crowell returned to Cleveland for a Thursday Night Football contest in Week 3. He had 16 carries for 34 yards and two rushing touchdowns in the loss to the Cleveland Browns. After running for one of his touchdowns, he used the football to simulate cleaning himself after defecation, then threw the ball into the stands, drawing an unsportsmanlike conduct penalty. With NFL Network carrying the game nationally and Joe Buck on the call, the gesture drew comparisons to when Randy Moss pretended to moon Green Bay Packers fans at Lambeau Field during an NFC Divisional Playoff game in early 2005. Buck had called Moss' act "disgusting" on air, but was more reserved for Crowell's celebration. During Week 5 against the Denver Broncos, Crowell finished with 219 rushing yards, including a 77-yard touchdown run as the Jets won 34–16. His 219 rushing yards set a new Jets franchise record. Crowell was awarded AFC Offensive Player of the Week honors for his performance. He was placed on injured reserve on December 14, 2018, with a toe injury he suffered against the Buffalo Bills. He finished the 2018 season with 143 carries for 685 rushing yards and six rushing touchdowns along with 21 receptions for 152 yards.

On March 14, 2019, Crowell was released by the Jets, after they signed Le'Veon Bell in free agency.

=== Oakland Raiders ===
On March 28, 2019, Crowell signed a one-year contract with the Oakland Raiders. On April 29, he suffered a severed Achilles during a team workout. He was placed on injured reserve on May 3, 2019, ending his season and career.

== Career statistics ==
=== NFL ===
Year	Team	Games		Rushing					Receiving					Fumbles	
Year	Team	GP	GS	Att	Yds	Avg	Lng	TD	Rec	Yds	Avg	Lng	TD	Fum	Lost
2014	CLE	16	4	148	607	4.1	35	8	9	87	9.7	19	0	3	2
2015	CLE	16	9	185	706	3.8	54	4	19	182	9.6	53	1	0	0
2016	CLE	16	16	198	952	4.8	85	7	40	319	8.0	44	0	2	2
2017	CLE	16	16	206	853	4.1	59	2	28	182	6.5	38	0	1	1
2018	NYJ	13	6	143	685	4.8	77	6	21	152	7.2	21	0	1	1
2019	OAK	0	0	Did not play due to injury											
Career		77	51	880	3,803	4.3	85	27	117	922	7.9	53	1	6	5

=== College ===
Year	Rushing						Receiving				
Year	Team	Att	Yds	Avg	Lng	TD	Rec	Yds	Avg	Lng	TD
2011	Georgia	185	856	4.6	28	5	8	59	7.4	23	1
2012	Alabama State	159	843	5.3	63	15	11	95	8.6	27	0
2013	Alabama State	170	1,121	6.6	84	15	7	27	3.9	9	0
Totals		514	2,813	5.5	84	35	26	181	8.1	27	1

== Controversy ==
In July 2016, following the deaths of Alton Sterling and Philando Castile, Crowell posted on his Instagram a controversial violent image of a faceless person dressed in black who was slitting the throat of a captive law enforcement officer with a knife; he later had the photo deleted and apologized for his actions.
