= 2013 Norfolk State Spartans football team =

American college football season

2013 Norfolk State Spartans football
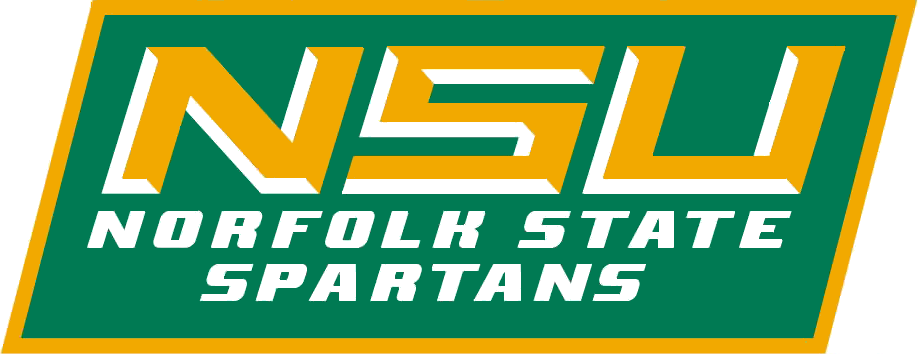
- Conference: Mid-Eastern Athletic Conference
- Record: 3–9 (3–5 MEAC)
- Head coach: Pete Adrian (9th season)
- Offensive coordinator: Howard Feggins (2nd season)
- Defensive coordinator: Mark DeBastiani (9th season)
- Home stadium: William "Dick" Price Stadium

2013 Mid-Eastern Athletic Conference football standings
	Conf.			Overall
Team	W		L	W		L
No. 16 Bethune–Cookman +^	7	–	1	10	–	3
No. 25 South Carolina State +^	7	–	1	9	–	4
Morgan State	5	–	3	5	–	7
Delaware State	5	–	3	5	–	6
North Carolina A&T	4	–	4	7	–	4
Howard	4	–	4	6	–	6
Hampton	4	–	4	4	–	8
North Carolina Central	3	–	5	5	–	7
Norfolk State	3	–	5	3	–	9
Florida A&M	2	–	6	3	–	9
Savannah State	0	–	8	1	–	11
+ – Conference co-champions; ^ – FCS playoff participant; Savannah State ineligible for FCS playoffs due to Academic Progress Rate sanctions; Rankings from The Sports Network poll

The 2013 Norfolk State Spartans football team represented Norfolk State University in the 2013 NCAA Division I FCS football season. They were led by ninth-year head coach Pete Adrian and played their home games at William "Dick" Price Stadium. They were a member of the Mid-Eastern Athletic Conference (MEAC).

The Spartans came into the season having been picked to finish seventh in the MEAC. The Spartans also entered the season with five players having been picked for the MEAC Pre-Season All-Conference 1st Team and four players having been selected for the 2nd-team.

They finished the season 3–9, 3–5 in MEAC play to finish in a tie for eighth place.

== Schedule ==
Date	Time	Opponent	Site	TV	Result	Attendance
August 31	6:00 pm	Maine*	William "Dick" Price Stadium; Norfolk, VA (Labor Day Classic)	SSC	L 6–23	8,881
September 7	12:00 pm	at Rutgers*	High Point Solutions Stadium; Piscataway, NJ	CBSSN	L 0–38	49,111
September 21	4:00 pm	Charleston Southern*	William "Dick" Price Stadium; Norfolk, VA	SSC	L 12–20	5,963
September 28	1:00 pm	at Morgan State	Hughes Stadium; Baltimore, MD		W 27–21	856
October 5	1:00 pm	Savannah State	William "Dick" Price Stadium; Norfolk, VA	SSC	W 26–24	6,272
October 12	2:00 pm	at Delaware State	Alumni Stadium; Dover, DE		L 7–14	2,800
October 19	1:00 pm	Hampton	William "Dick" Price Stadium; Norfolk, VA (Battle of the Bay)	SSC	L 17–27	8,525
October 26	1:00 pm	Old Dominion*	William "Dick" Price Stadium; Norfolk, VA (Rivalry)	SSC	L 24–27	11,308
November 2	2:00 pm	Florida A&M^{†}	William "Dick" Price Stadium; Norfolk, VA	SSC	L 6–16	10,627
November 9	4:00 pm	at No. 12 Bethune-Cookman	Municipal Stadium; Daytona Beach, FL		W 27–24	5,651
November 16	2:00 pm	at North Carolina Central	O'Kelly–Riddick Stadium; Durham, NC		L 13–24	6,108
November 23	1:00 pm	South Carolina State	William "Dick" Price Stadium; Norfolk, VA	SSC	L 3–17	5,639
*Non-conference game; ^{†}Homecoming; Rankings from The Sports Network Poll released prior to the game; All times are in Eastern time

- Source: Schedule
