= 2013 Grambling State Tigers football team =

American college football season

2013 Grambling State Tigers football
- Conference: Southwestern Athletic Conference
- West Division
- Record: 1–11 (1–8 SWAC)
- Head coach: Doug Williams (9th season; first 2 games); George Ragsdale (interim, games 3–7); Dennis Winston (interim, final 5 games)
- Offensive coordinator: Vyron Brown (3rd season)
- Offensive scheme: Pro-style
- Defensive coordinator: Dennis Winston (1st season)
- Base defense: 4–3
- Home stadium: Eddie Robinson Stadium

2013 Southwestern Athletic Conference football standings
	Conf.			Overall
Team	W		L	W		L
East Division
Jackson State xy	8	–	1	8	–	4
Alcorn State	7	–	2	9	–	3
Alabama State *	7	–	2	8	–	4
Alabama A&M	4	–	5	4	–	8
Mississippi Valley State *	2	–	7	2	–	9
West Division
Southern xy$	7	–	2	9	–	4
Prairie View A&M	5	–	4	6	–	6
Arkansas–Pine Bluff	2	–	7	2	–	9
Texas Southern *	2	–	7	2	–	9
Grambling State	1	–	8	1	–	11
Championship: Southern 34, Jackson State 27 ^{2OT}
$ – Conference champion; x – Division champion/co-champions; y – Championship game participant; * – ineligible for postseason

The 2013 Grambling State Tigers football team represented Grambling State University in the 2013 NCAA Division I FCS football season. The Tigers were led by head coach Doug Williams in the third season of his second tenure as head coach and ninth overall after coaching the Tigers from 1998 to 2003. They competed as a member of the West Division of the Southwestern Athletic Conference (SWAC) and played their home games at Eddie Robinson Stadium in Grambling, Louisiana. The Tigers finished the season with a 1–11 record.

Head coach Doug Williams' contract was bought out after the first two games of the season. He was replaced by interim head coach George Ragsdale, the team's running backs coach. Ragsdale was subsequently fired on October 17 after losing five games in a row and replaced with Dennis Winston as interim head coach. In response to a number of players being dissatisfied with the conditions of the facility and practices of the athletic department, Grambling State refused to play the October 19 game against Jackson State University. As such, their game against the Tigers was forfeited. On October 22, the players officially ended their boycott, and the team returned to the field for their next game against Texas Southern University.

On December 4, 2013, Broderick Fobbs was introduced as Winston's replacement as full-time head coach of the Tigers.

== Schedule ==
Date	Time	Opponent	Site	TV	Result	Attendance
August 31	6:00 pm	Alabama A&M	Eddie Robinson Stadium; Grambling, LA	PSB	L 9–23	7,648
September 7	6:00 pm	at Louisiana–Monroe*	Malone Stadium; Monroe, LA	ESPN3	L 10–48	23,600
September 14	4:00 pm	vs. Lincoln (MO)*	Arrowhead Stadium; Kansas City, MO		L 34–47	20,176
September 21	5:00 pm	at Alabama State	The New ASU Stadium; Montgomery, AL		L 21–52	11,751
September 28	6:00 pm	Lamar*	Eddie Robinson Stadium; Grambling, LA	PSB	L 16–27	6,497
October 5	6:00 pm	vs. Prairie View A&M	Cotton Bowl; Dallas, TX (State Fair Classic)		L 3–31	27,745
October 12	4:00 pm	vs. Alcorn State	Lucas Oil Stadium; Indianapolis, IN (Circle City Classic)		L 0–48	22,357
October 19	2:00 pm	at Jackson State	Mississippi Veterans Memorial Stadium; Jackson, MS		L forfeit ^{A}	
October 26	2:00 pm	Texas Southern	Eddie Robinson Stadium; Grambling, LA	PSB	L 17–23 ^{OT}	7,670
November 2	2:00 pm	Mississippi Valley State^{†}	Eddie Robinson Stadium; Grambling, LA	PSB	W 47–40	10,155
November 9	2:30 pm	at Arkansas–Pine Bluff	Golden Lion Stadium; Pine Bluff, AR		L 42–45	5,787
November 30	1:30 pm	vs. Southern	Mercedes-Benz Superdome; New Orleans, LA (Bayou Classic)	NBC	L 17–40	47,385
*Non-conference game; ^{†}Homecoming; All times are in Central time

- ^A October 19's game against Jackson State was forfeited due to Grambling State players refusing to travel to Jackson State.
