= 2013 Alabama A&M Bulldogs football team =

American college football season

2013 Alabama A&M Bulldogs football
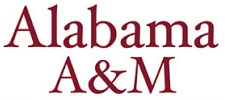
- Conference: Southwestern Athletic Conference
- East Division
- Record: 4–8 (4–5 SWAC)
- Head coach: Anthony Jones (12th season)
- Offensive coordinator: Cedric Pearl (7th season)
- Defensive coordinator: Brawnski Towns (35th season)
- Home stadium: Louis Crews Stadium

2013 Southwestern Athletic Conference football standings
	Conf.			Overall
Team	W		L	W		L
East Division
Jackson State xy	8	–	1	8	–	4
Alcorn State	7	–	2	9	–	3
Alabama State *	7	–	2	8	–	4
Alabama A&M	4	–	5	4	–	8
Mississippi Valley State *	2	–	7	2	–	9
West Division
Southern xy$	7	–	2	9	–	4
Prairie View A&M	5	–	4	6	–	6
Arkansas–Pine Bluff	2	–	7	2	–	9
Texas Southern *	2	–	7	2	–	9
Grambling State	1	–	8	1	–	11
Championship: Southern 34, Jackson State 27 ^{2OT}
$ – Conference champion; x – Division champion/co-champions; y – Championship game participant; * – ineligible for postseason

The 2013 Alabama A&M Bulldogs football team represented Alabama Agricultural and Mechanical University (Alabama A&M) in the 2013 NCAA Division I FCS football season. The Bulldogs were led by 12th-year head coach Anthony Jones and played their home games at Louis Crews Stadium. They were a member of the East Division of the Southwestern Athletic Conference and finished the season with a 4–8 record.

At SWAC Media Day, the Bulldogs were picked to finish third in the division. Additionally 5 Bulldogs players: Montaurius Corey Johnson, Reginald Bailey, Justin Goodrich, and Derrick Harris, were selected to the SWAC 2nd-team All-Conference.

== Schedule ==
Date	Time	Opponent	Site	TV	Result	Attendance
August 31	6:00 pm	at Grambling State	Eddie Robinson Stadium; Grambling, LA		W 23–9	7,648
September 7	6:00 pm	Tuskegee*	Louis Crews Stadium; Huntsville, AL (Lewis Crews Classic)		L 7–23	13,267
September 14	6:00 pm	at South Carolina State*	Oliver C. Dawson Stadium; Orangeburg, SC		L 0–32	11,146
September 21	6:00 pm	at Prairie View A&M	Edward L. Blackshear Field; Prairie View, TX		L 26–28	4,712
September 28	6:00 pm	Texas Southern	Louis Crews Stadium; Huntsville, AL		W 12–10	7,267
October 5	1:00 pm	Mississippi Valley State^{†}	Louis Crews Stadium; Huntsville, AL		L 9–28	12,873
October 12	6:00 pm	at Southern	Ace W. Mumford Stadium; Baton Rouge, LA	CST^	L 17–20 ^{OT}	15,815
October 26	2:30 pm	vs. Alabama State	Legion Field; Birmingham, AL (76th Magic City Classic)	ESPN3; ESPNU^	L 7–31	63,113
November 2	4:00 pm	at Alcorn State	Casem-Spinks Stadium; Lorman, MS		W 19–18	7,037
November 9	1:00 pm	Jackson State	Louis Crews Stadium; Huntsville, AL		L 20–26	7,365
November 16	1:00 pm	Arkansas–Pine Bluff	Louis Crews Stadium; Huntsville, AL		W 50–42	7,783
November 23	12:30 pm	at Georgia Tech*	Bobby Dodd Stadium; Atlanta, GA	ESPN3	L 7–66	45,194
*Non-conference game; ^{†}Homecoming; All times are in Central time

^Games aired on a tape delayed basis
