= Dwayne Foster =

American football player and coach

Playing career
- 1989–1992: Delaware State

Coaching career (HC unless noted)
- 1997–2002: Archbishop Carroll HS (DC)
- 2003: Bowie State (OL)
- 2004: Catholic University (TE/RB)
- 2005–2010: Prairie View A&M (RB/OL)
- 2011–2012: North Carolina Central (AHC/RC/OL)
- 2013: North Carolina Central (interim HC)
- 2014: Morgan State (OL)

Head coaching record
- Overall: 5–7 (college)

Dwayne Foster is an American former football player and coach. He served as the interim head football coach at North Carolina Central University for one season, in 2013, compiling a record of 5–7. Foster was the assistant head, coach, recruiting coordinator, and offensive line coach at North Carolina Central from 2011 to 2012.

== Head coaching record ==
=== College ===
Year	Team	Overall	Conference	Standing	Bowl/playoffs
North Carolina Central Eagles (Mid-Eastern Athletic Conference) (2013)
2013	North Carolina Central	5–7	3–5	T–8th	
North Carolina Central:		5–7	3–5		
Total:		5–7			
