= 2013 Southern Jaguars football team =

American college football season

2013 Southern Jaguars football
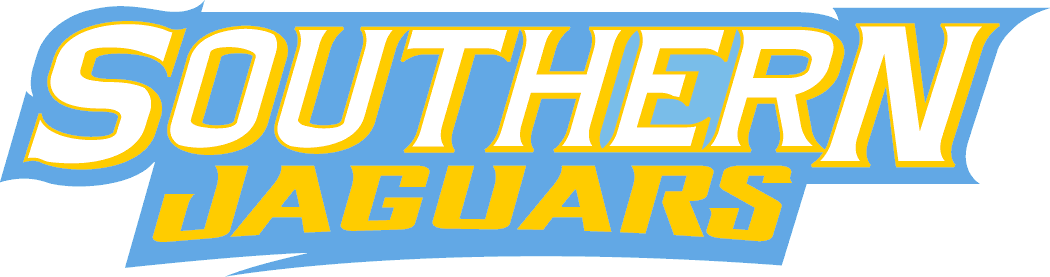

SWAC champion SWAC West Division champion

SWAC Championship Game, W 34–27 ^{2OT} vs. Jackson State
- Conference: Southwestern Athletic Conference
- West Division
- Record: 9–4 (7–2 SWAC)
- Head coach: Dawson Odums (1st season)
- Co-offensive coordinators: Chennis Berry (1st season); Chad Germany (2nd season)
- Home stadium: Ace W. Mumford Stadium

2013 Southwestern Athletic Conference football standings
| | Conf. | | | Overall |
| Team | W | | L | W | | L |
|---|---|---|---|---|---|---|
East Division
| Jackson State xy | 8 | – | 1 | 8 | – | 4 |
| Alcorn State | 7 | – | 2 | 9 | – | 3 |
| Alabama State * | 7 | – | 2 | 8 | – | 4 |
| Alabama A&M | 4 | – | 5 | 4 | – | 8 |
| Mississippi Valley State * | 2 | – | 7 | 2 | – | 9 |
West Division
| Southern xy$ | 7 | – | 2 | 9 | – | 4 |
| Prairie View A&M | 5 | – | 4 | 6 | – | 6 |
| Arkansas–Pine Bluff | 2 | – | 7 | 2 | – | 9 |
| Texas Southern * | 2 | – | 7 | 2 | – | 9 |
| Grambling State | 1 | – | 8 | 1 | – | 11 |
Championship: Southern 34, Jackson State 27 ^{2OT}
$ – Conference champion; x – Division champion/co-champions; y – Championship game participant; * – ineligible for postseason

The 2013 Southern Jaguars football team represented Southern University in the 2013 NCAA Division I FCS football season. The Jaguars were led by first year head coach Dawson Odums, who was made the new head coach he served serving as interim head coach for the final nine games of the previous season. The Jaguars played their home games at Ace W. Mumford Stadium and were a member of the West Division of the Southwestern Athletic Conference (SWAC). The Jaguars finished the season with a 9–4 record, as West Division Champions and with a victory over Jackson State in the SWAC Championship Game.

== Schedule ==
| Date | Time | Opponent | Site | TV | Result | Attendance |
|---|---|---|---|---|---|---|
| August 30 | 7:30 pm | at Houston* | Reliant Stadium; Houston, TX | ESPN3 | L 13–62 | 26,205 |
| September 7 | 6:00 pm | at Northwestern State* | Harry Turpin Stadium; Natchitoches, LA | | L 14–55 | 14,873 |
| September 14 | 6:00 pm | Prairie View A&M | Ace W. Mumford Stadium; Baton Rouge, LA | CST^ | W 62–59 ^{2OT} | 14,586 |
| September 21 | 1:00 pm | at Mississippi Valley State | Rice–Totten Field; Itta Bena, MS | | W 17–7 | 3,986 |
| September 28 | 6:00 pm | Jackson State | Ace W. Mumford Stadium; Baton Rouge, LA (rivalry) | CST^ | L 14–19 | 30,816 |
| October 12 | 6:00 pm | Alabama A&M | Ace W. Mumford Stadium; Baton Rouge, LA | CST^ | W 20–17 ^{OT} | 15,815 |
| October 19 | 2:30 pm | at Arkansas–Pine Bluff | Golden Lion Stadium; Pine Bluff, AR | | W 29–21 | 11,059 |
| October 26 | 5:30 pm | Alcorn State^{†} | Ace W. Mumford Stadium; Baton Rouge, LA | CST^ | L 38–44 ^{OT} | 27,102 |
| November 1 | 8:00 pm | at Texas Southern | BBVA Compass Stadium; Houston, TX | CSNH^ | W 31–24 | 6,406 |
| November 9 | 6:00 pm | at Alabama State | New ASU Stadium; Montgomery, AL | | W 31–28 | 15,143 |
| November 16 | 6:00 pm | Clark Atlanta* | Ace W. Mumford Stadium; Baton Rouge, LA | CST^ | W 53–0 | 12,217 |
| November 30 | 1:30 pm | vs. Grambling State | Mercedes-Benz Superdome; New Orleans, LA (Bayou Classic) | NBC | W 40–17 | 47,385 |
| December 7 | 1:00 pm | vs. Jackson State | Reliant Stadium; Houston, TX (SWAC Championship Game) | ESPNU | W 34–27 ^{2OT} | 38,985 |
*Non-conference game; ^{†}Homecoming; All times are in Central time

^Games will air on a tape delayed basis

== Media ==
All Southern Jaguars football games were broadcast on KQXL-FM 106.5 with Chris Powers (play-by-play), Gerald Kimble (analyst), and Eric Randall (sideline) calling the Jaguar Action. All home games will also been televised tape delayed by Cox Sports, usually on Sunday nights.
