= 2013 Delaware State Hornets football team =

American college football season

2013 Delaware State Hornets football
- Conference: Mid-Eastern Athletic Conference
- Record: 5–6 (5–3 MEAC)
- Head coach: Kermit Blount (3rd season)
- Offensive coordinator: Arrington Jones (3rd season)
- Defensive coordinator: Mike Ketchum (3rd season)
- Home stadium: Alumni Stadium

2013 Mid-Eastern Athletic Conference football standings
	Conf.			Overall
Team	W		L	W		L
No. 16 Bethune–Cookman +^	7	–	1	10	–	3
No. 25 South Carolina State +^	7	–	1	9	–	4
Morgan State	5	–	3	5	–	7
Delaware State	5	–	3	5	–	6
North Carolina A&T	4	–	4	7	–	4
Howard	4	–	4	6	–	6
Hampton	4	–	4	4	–	8
North Carolina Central	3	–	5	5	–	7
Norfolk State	3	–	5	3	–	9
Florida A&M	2	–	6	3	–	9
Savannah State	0	–	8	1	–	11
+ – Conference co-champions; ^ – FCS playoff participant; Savannah State ineligible for FCS playoffs due to Academic Progress Rate sanctions; Rankings from The Sports Network poll

The 2013 Delaware State Hornets football team represented Delaware State University as a member of the Mid-Eastern Athletic Conference (MEAC) in the 2013 NCAA Division I FCS football season. Led by third-year head coach Kermit Blount, the Hornets compiled an overall record of 5–6 with a mark of 5–3 in conference play, tying for third place in the MEAC. Delaware State played home games at Alumni Stadium in Dover, Delaware.

The Hornets entered the 2013 season having been picked to finish eighth in the MEAC.

== Schedule ==
Date	Time	Opponent	Site	TV	Result	Attendance
September 7	3:30 pm	at Delaware*	Delaware Stadium; Newark, DE (Route 1 Rivalry)	NBCSN	L 21–42	19,316
September 14	7:30 pm	at No. 4 Towson*	Johnny Unitas Stadium; Towson, MD		L 7–49	10,302
September 21	3:30 pm	at No. 1 North Dakota State*	Fargodome; Fargo, ND (College GameDay)	FCS	L 0–51	18,995
September 28	6:00 pm	at Savannah State	Ted Wright Stadium; Savannah, GA		W 24–22	2,350
October 5	2:00 pm	No. 21 Bethune-Cookman	Alumni Stadium; Dover, DE		L 7–21	2,205
October 12	2:00 pm	Norfolk State^{†}	Alumni Stadium; Dover, DE		W 14–7	2,800
October 19	1:00 pm	at North Carolina A&T	Aggie Stadium; Greensboro, NC		W 12–7	7,327
October 26	1:00 pm	at Hampton	Armstrong Stadium; Hampton, VA		L 7–30	2,700
November 2	2:00 pm	Howard	Alumni Stadium; Dover, DE		W 22–20	2,039
November 16	2:00 pm	at Florida A&M	Bragg Memorial Stadium; Tallahassee, FL		W 29–21	7,026
November 23	2:00 pm	Morgan State	Alumni Stadium; Dover, DE	DESU-TV	L 26–31	1,394
*Non-conference game; ^{†}Homecoming; Rankings from The Sports Network Poll released prior to the game; All times are in Eastern time
