= 2013 Alcorn State Braves football team =

American college football season

2013 Alcorn State Braves football
- Conference: Southwestern Athletic Conference
- East Division
- Record: 9–3 (7–2 SWAC)
- Head coach: Jay Hopson (2nd season)
- Offensive coordinator: Willie Simmons (2nd season)
- Defensive coordinator: Tony Pecoraro (2nd season)
- Home stadium: Casem-Spinks Stadium

2013 Southwestern Athletic Conference football standings
	Conf.			Overall
Team	W		L	W		L
East Division
Jackson State xy	8	–	1	8	–	4
Alcorn State	7	–	2	9	–	3
Alabama State *	7	–	2	8	–	4
Alabama A&M	4	–	5	4	–	8
Mississippi Valley State *	2	–	7	2	–	9
West Division
Southern xy$	7	–	2	9	–	4
Prairie View A&M	5	–	4	6	–	6
Arkansas–Pine Bluff	2	–	7	2	–	9
Texas Southern *	2	–	7	2	–	9
Grambling State	1	–	8	1	–	11
Championship: Southern 34, Jackson State 27 ^{2OT}
$ – Conference champion; x – Division champion/co-champions; y – Championship game participant; * – ineligible for postseason

The 2013 Alcorn State Braves football team represented Alcorn State University in the 2013 NCAA Division I FCS football season. The Braves were led by second year head coach Jay Hopson and played their home games at Casem-Spinks Stadium. They are a member of the East Division of the Southwestern Athletic Conference (SWAC). The Braves finished the season with a 9–3 record.

On Media Day, Alcorn State was picked to finish fifth in the Eastern Division of the SWAC. They had one player, defensive back Jamison Knox, that was picked to the Pre-season All-SWAC 2nd Team Defense.

== Schedule ==
Date	Time	Opponent	Site	TV	Result	Attendance
August 31	4:00 pm	Edward Waters*	Casem-Spinks Stadium; Lorman, MS		W 63–12	3,100
September 7	2:30 pm	at Mississippi State*	Davis Wade Stadium; Starkville, MS	CSS	L 7–51	55,085
September 14	2:00 pm	Mississippi Valley State	Casem-Spinks Stadium; Lorman, MS		W 35–28	2,565
September 21	6:00 pm	at Arkansas–Pine Bluff	Golden Lion Stadium; Pine Bluff, AR		W 21–16	5,714
September 28	5:00 pm	at Alabama State	The New ASU Stadium; Montgomery, AL		L 30–49	12,503
October 5	2:00 pm	Warner*^{†}	Casem-Spinks Stadium; Lorman, MS		W 57–0	3,430
October 12	3:00 pm	vs. Grambling State	Lucas Oil Stadium; Indianapolis, IN (Circle City Classic)		W 48–0	22,357
October 19	2:00 pm	at Texas Southern	BBVA Compass Stadium; Houston, TX	CSNH^	W 20–13	4,582
October 26	5:30 pm	at Southern	Ace W. Mumford Stadium; Baton Rouge, LA	CST^	W 44–38 ^{OT}	27,102
November 2	4:00 pm	Alabama A&M	Casem-Spinks Stadium; Lorman, MS		L 18–19	7,037
November 7	6:30 pm	Prairie View A&M	Casem-Spinks Stadium; Lorman, MS		W 50–35	4,517
November 16	2:00 pm	at Jackson State	Mississippi Veterans Memorial Stadium; Jackson, MS (Soul Bowl)		W 48–33	24,252
*Non-conference game; ^{†}Homecoming; All times are in Central time

^Games will air on a tape delayed basis
