= 2013 Hampton Pirates football team =

American college football season

2013 Hampton Pirates football
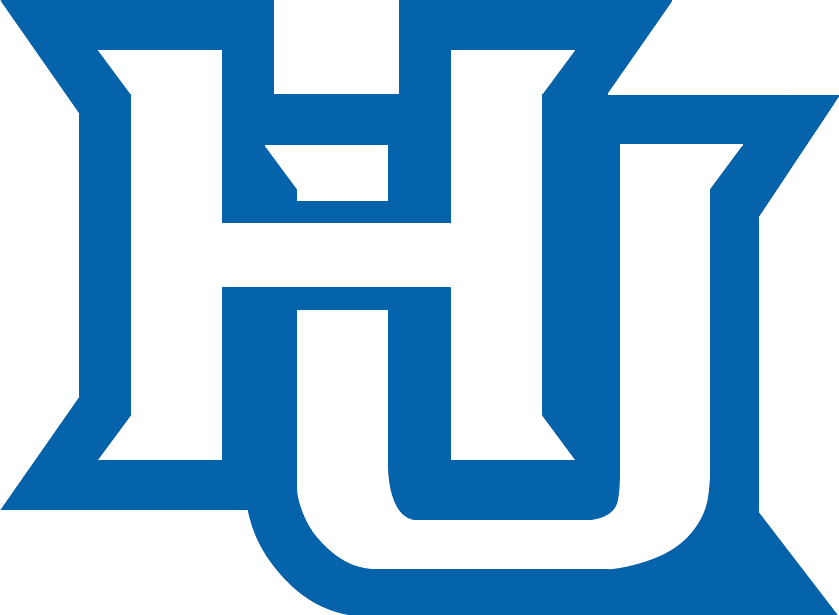
- Conference: Mid-Eastern Athletic Conference
- Record: 4–8 (4–4 MEAC)
- Head coach: Donovan Rose (5th season)
- Offensive coordinator: Glen Ferebee (1st season)
- Defensive coordinator: Bernard Clark Jr. (2nd season)
- Home stadium: Armstrong Stadium

2013 Mid-Eastern Athletic Conference football standings
| | Conf. | | | Overall |
| Team | W | | L | W | | L |
|---|---|---|---|---|---|---|
| No. 16 Bethune–Cookman +^ | 7 | – | 1 | 10 | – | 3 |
| No. 25 South Carolina State +^ | 7 | – | 1 | 9 | – | 4 |
| Morgan State | 5 | – | 3 | 5 | – | 7 |
| Delaware State | 5 | – | 3 | 5 | – | 6 |
| North Carolina A&T | 4 | – | 4 | 7 | – | 4 |
| Howard | 4 | – | 4 | 6 | – | 6 |
| Hampton | 4 | – | 4 | 4 | – | 8 |
| North Carolina Central | 3 | – | 5 | 5 | – | 7 |
| Norfolk State | 3 | – | 5 | 3 | – | 9 |
| Florida A&M | 2 | – | 6 | 3 | – | 9 |
| Savannah State | 0 | – | 8 | 1 | – | 11 |
+ – Conference co-champions; ^ – FCS playoff participant; Savannah State ineligible for FCS playoffs due to Academic Progress Rate sanctions; Rankings from The Sports Network poll

The 2013 Hampton Pirates football team represented Hampton University in the 2013 NCAA Division I FCS football season. They were led by fifth year head coach Donovan Rose and played their home games at Armstrong Stadium. They were a member of the Mid-Eastern Athletic Conference.

The Pirates entered the season with a new offensive and defensive coordinator. Earlier in the off-season Glen Ferebee was brought on board to be the Quarterbacks coach at Hampton. However, on July 2, he was named as the new offensive coordinator. Meanwhile, Bernard Clark Jr. was brought back to be the Pirates defensive coordinator. Previously Clark served as defensive coordinator for Hampton under Rose in 2009.

At the MEAC Media Days on July 26, Hampton was picked to finish 6th in the 2013 MEAC season. Hampton also entered the season with one defensive player and two special teams players having been selected for 2nd team All-Conference.

They finished the season 4–8, 4–4 in MEAC play to finish in a three-way tie for fifth place.

At the end of the season, head coach Donovan Rose was fired after 5 seasons.

== Schedule ==
| Date | Time | Opponent | Site | TV | Result | Attendance |
|---|---|---|---|---|---|---|
| August 29 | 7:00 pm | at Western Illinois* | Hanson Field; Macomb, IL | | L 9–42 | 6,437 |
| September 7 | 7:00 pm | at William & Mary* | Zable Stadium; Williamsburg, VA | | L 7–31 | 9,802 |
| September 14 | 6:00 pm | Tennessee Tech* | Armstrong Stadium; Hampton, VA | | L 27–30 | 2,709 |
| September 21 | 6:00 pm | at No. 15 Coastal Carolina* | Brooks Stadium; Conway, SC | | L 17–50 | 9,386 |
| September 28 | 2:00 pm | at South Carolina State | Oliver C. Dawson Stadium; Orangeburg, SC | ESPNU | L 6–30 | 17,139 |
| October 12 | 2:00 pm | North Carolina A&T^{†} | Armstrong Stadium; Hampton, VA | | W 31–26 | 8,500 |
| October 19 | 1:00 pm | at Norfolk State | William "Dick" Price Stadium; Norfolk, VA (Battle of the Bay) | | W 27–17 | 8,525 |
| October 26 | 1:00 pm | Delaware State | Armstrong Stadium; Hampton, VA | | W 30–7 | 2,700 |
| November 2 | 1:00 pm | at Morgan State | Hughes Stadium; Baltimore, MD | | L 27–30 | 5,789 |
| November 9 | 1:00 pm | North Carolina Central | Armstrong Stadium; Hampton, VA | | W 29–21 | 2,800 |
| November 16 | 4:00 pm | at No. 18 Bethune-Cookman | Municipal Stadium; Daytona Beach, FL | | L 12–42 | 4,104 |
| November 23 | 1:00 pm | Howard | Armstrong Stadium; Hampton, VA (Battle of "The Real HU") | | L 39–42 ^{2OT} | 3,355 |
*Non-conference game; ^{†}Homecoming; Rankings from The Sports Network Poll released prior to the game; All times are in Eastern time

- Source: Hampton University Announces 2013 football schedule
