= 2013 Florida A&M Rattlers football team =

American college football season

2013 Florida A&M Rattlers football
- Conference: Mid-Eastern Athletic Conference
- Record: 3–9 (2–6 MEAC)
- Head coach: Earl Holmes (1st season)
- Offensive coordinator: Quinn Gray (1st season)
- Defensive coordinator: Levon Kirkland (1st season)
- Home stadium: Bragg Memorial Stadium

2013 Mid-Eastern Athletic Conference football standings
	Conf.			Overall
Team	W		L	W		L
No. 16 Bethune–Cookman +^	7	–	1	10	–	3
No. 25 South Carolina State +^	7	–	1	9	–	4
Morgan State	5	–	3	5	–	7
Delaware State	5	–	3	5	–	6
North Carolina A&T	4	–	4	7	–	4
Howard	4	–	4	6	–	6
Hampton	4	–	4	4	–	8
North Carolina Central	3	–	5	5	–	7
Norfolk State	3	–	5	3	–	9
Florida A&M	2	–	6	3	–	9
Savannah State	0	–	8	1	–	11
+ – Conference co-champions; ^ – FCS playoff participant; Savannah State ineligible for FCS playoffs due to Academic Progress Rate sanctions; Rankings from The Sports Network poll

The 2013 Florida A&M Rattlers football team represented Florida A&M University in the 2013 NCAA Division I FCS football season. The Rattlers were led by new head coach Earl Holmes and played their home games at Bragg Memorial Stadium. They were a member of the Mid-Eastern Athletic Conference.

In addition to a new head coach, Florida A&M entered the season with a new offensive and defensive coordinator. Levon Kirkland came aboard as the new defensive coordinator, while Quinn Gray returned for his second season as quarterback coach and his first season as offensive coordinator. George Small also returned to the team as the Assistant Head Coach after failing to get the head coaching job at Southern University.

The Rattlers entered the 2013 season having been picked to finish fifth in the MEAC and having placed 11-players on the All-MEAC Pre-Season team.

They finished the season 3–9, 2–6 in MEAC play to finish in tenth place.

== Schedule ==
Date	Time	Opponent	Site	TV	Result	Attendance
September 1	11:45 am	vs. Mississippi Valley State*	Florida Citrus Bowl; Orlando, FL (MEAC/SWAC Challenge)	ESPN	W 27–10	24,376
September 7	2:00 pm	Tennessee State*	Bragg Memorial Stadium; Tallahassee, FL		L 7–27	14,237
September 14	2:00 pm	Samford*	Bragg Memorial Stadium; Tallahassee, FL		L 20–27	10,034
September 21	12:00 pm	at No. 3 (FBS) Ohio State*	Ohio Stadium; Columbus, OH	BTN	L 0–76	103,595
October 5	1:00 pm	at Morgan State	Hughes Stadium; Baltimore, MD		L 21–34	1,259
October 12	6:00 pm	at Savannah State	Ted Wright Stadium; Savannah, GA	WGSA	W 27–14	5,620
October 19	2:00 pm	Howard^{†}	Bragg Memorial Stadium; Tallahassee, FL		L 10–21	15,342
October 26	2:00 pm	North Carolina A&T	Bragg Memorial Stadium; Tallahassee, FL		L 13–20 ^{OT}	9,209
November 2	2:00 pm	at Norfolk State	William "Dick" Price Stadium; Norfolk, VA		W 16–6	10,627
November 9	1:30 pm	at South Carolina State	Oliver C. Dawson Stadium; Orangeburg, SC		L 21–25	20,022
November 16	2:00 pm	Delaware State	Bragg Memorial Stadium; Tallahassee, FL		L 21–29	7,026
November 23	2:00 pm	vs. No. 14 Bethune-Cookman	Florida Citrus Bowl; Orlando, FL (Florida Classic)	ESPNC	L 10–29	45,321
*Non-conference game; ^{†}Homecoming; Rankings from The Sports Network Poll released prior to the game; All times are in Eastern time
