= Dennis Winston =

American football player and coach (born 1955)

Dirt Winston
No. 53, 56, 55
- Position: Linebacker

Personal information
- Born: October 25, 1955 (age 71); Forrest City, Arkansas, U.S.
- Listed height: 6 ft 0 in (1.83 m)
- Listed weight: 228 lb (103 kg)

Career information
- College: Arkansas (1973–1976)
- NFL draft: 1977: 5th round, 132nd overall pick

Career history

Playing
- Pittsburgh Steelers (1977–1981); New Orleans Saints (1982–1985); Pittsburgh Steelers (1985–1986)

Coaching
- Grove City (1987) Linebackers coach; Slippery Rock (1988) Linebackers coach; Arkansas State (1989–1991) Linebackers coach; Grambling State (1992–1993) Defensive coordinator & linebackers coach; Norfolk State (1994) Defensive coordinator & linebackers coach; Grambling State (1995–1996) Defensive coordinator & linebackers coach; Arkansas (1997–1998) Outside linebackers coach; Lincoln HS (TX) (1999) Defensive coordinator; Kentucky State (2000) Defensive coordinator & linebackers coach; Toledo (2001–2002) Linebackers coach; Toledo (2003) Defensive line coach; Edmonton Eskimos (2005–2006) Defensive line coach; Mississippi Valley State (2007–2009) Defensive line coach; Arkansas–Pine Bluff (2010–2012) Defensive line coach; Grambling State (2013) Defensive coordinator; Grambling State (2013) Interim head coach; Eastern Illinois (2014–2015) Defensive line coach

Awards and highlights
- 2× Super Bowl champion (XIII, XIV); Second-team All-SWC (1974)

Career NFL statistics
- Interceptions: 13
- Fumble recoveries: 13
- Defensive touchdowns: 3
- Stats at Pro Football Reference

Dennis "Dirt" Winston (born October 25, 1955) is an American former professional football player who was a linebacker in the National Football League (NFL) for the Pittsburgh Steelers and the New Orleans Saints. He played college football for the Arkansas Razorbacks. He substituted for the injured Jack Ham in Super Bowl XIV as the starting left outside linebacker. On October 17, 2013, Winston was named interim head coach for the Grambling State Tigers football team.

Winston coached for Grove City, Slippery Rock, Arkansas State, Norfolk State, Arkansas, Lincoln High School, Kentucky State, Toledo, the Edmonton Elks of the Canadian Football League (CFL), Mississippi Valley State, Arkansas–Pine Bluff, and Eastern Illinois.

== Head coaching record ==
Year	Team	Overall	Conference	Standing	Bowl/playoffs
Grambling State Tigers (Southern Intercollegiate Athletic Conference) (2013)
2013	Grambling State	1–4 (Note: Doug Williams began the 2013 season as Grambling State's head coach, but was fired after two games. George Ragsdale was appointed interim head coach and helmed the team for four games before he was relieved of his duties and replaced by Winston. Grambling State finished the season with an overall record of 1–11 and a mark of 1–8 in conference play, placing fifth in the West Division of the Southwestern Athletic Conference (SWAC))	1–4	5th (West)	
Grambling State:		1–4	1–4		
Total:		1–4			
