= 2013 Bethune–Cookman Wildcats football team =

American college football season

2013 Bethune-Cookman Wildcats football

MEAC co-champion

FCS Playoffs First Round, L 24–48 vs. Coastal Carolina
- Conference: Mid-Eastern Athletic Conference

Ranking
- Sports Network: No. 16
- FCS Coaches: No. 16
- Record: 10–3 (7–1 MEAC)
- Head coach: Brian Jenkins (4th season)
- Offensive coordinator: Jim Pry (2nd season)
- Defensive coordinator: Charles Jones (4th season)
- Home stadium: Municipal Stadium

2013 Mid-Eastern Athletic Conference football standings
	Conf.			Overall
Team	W		L	W		L
No. 16 Bethune–Cookman +^	7	–	1	10	–	3
No. 25 South Carolina State +^	7	–	1	9	–	4
Morgan State	5	–	3	5	–	7
Delaware State	5	–	3	5	–	6
North Carolina A&T	4	–	4	7	–	4
Howard	4	–	4	6	–	6
Hampton	4	–	4	4	–	8
North Carolina Central	3	–	5	5	–	7
Norfolk State	3	–	5	3	–	9
Florida A&M	2	–	6	3	–	9
Savannah State	0	–	8	1	–	11
+ – Conference co-champions; ^ – FCS playoff participant; Savannah State ineligible for FCS playoffs due to Academic Progress Rate sanctions; Rankings from The Sports Network poll

The 2013 Bethune–Cookman Wildcats football team represented Bethune-Cookman University in the 2013 NCAA Division I FCS football season. They were led by fourth-year head coach Brian Jenkins and played their home games at Municipal Stadium. They were a member of the Mid-Eastern Athletic Conference (MEAC). Bethune-Cookman finished the season 10–3, 7–1 in MEAC play to win a share of the conference championship with South Carolina State. Due to their win over South Carolina State, they received the conference's automatic bid to the FCS Playoffs, where they lost in the first round to Coastal Carolina.

== Schedule ==
Date	Time	Opponent	Rank	Site	TV	Result	Attendance
September 1	8:00 pm	at Tennessee State*	No. 23	LP Field; Nashville, TN (John Merritt Classic)	ESPN3	W 12–9	16,108
September 7	4:00 pm	Virginia Union*	No. 25	Municipal Stadium; Daytona Beach, FL	CEN	W 66–7	6,478
September 14	6:00 pm	at FIU*	No. 23	FIU Stadium; Miami, FL		W 34–13	14,957
September 21	4:00 pm	at No. 8 (FBS) Florida State*	No. 19	Doak Campbell Stadium; Tallahassee, FL	ESPN3	L 6–54	74,841
October 5	2:00 pm	at Delaware State	No. 21	Alumni Stadium; Dover, DE		W 21–7	2,205
October 12	1:00 pm	at Howard	No. 16	William H. Greene Stadium; Washington, DC		W 27–6	1,052
October 19	4:00 pm	Savannah State	No. 17	Municipal Stadium; Daytona Beach, FL	CEN	W 48–21	4,693
October 26	4:00 pm	South Carolina State^{†}	No. 14	Municipal Stadium; Daytona Beach, FL		W 14–3	10,421
November 2	12:00 pm	at North Carolina Central	No. 13	O'Kelly–Riddick Stadium; Durham, NC	ESPNews	W 38–14	6,411
November 9	4:00 pm	Norfolk State	No. 12	Municipal Stadium; Daytona Beach, FL	CEN	L 24–27	5,651
November 16	4:00 pm	Hampton	No. 18	Municipal Stadium; Daytona Beach, FL	CEN	W 42–12	4,104
November 23	2:00 pm	vs. Florida A&M	No. 14	Citrus Bowl; Orlando, FL (Florida Classic)	ESPNC	W 29–10	45,321
November 30	1:00 pm	at No. 11 Coastal Carolina*	No. 12	Brooks Stadium; Conway, SC (FCS Playoffs First Round)	ESPN3	L 24–48	3,007
*Non-conference game; ^{†}Homecoming; Rankings from The Sports Network Poll released prior to the game; All times are in Eastern time

== Ranking movements ==
Ranking movements Legend: ██ Increase in ranking ██ Decrease in ranking
	Week														
Poll	Pre	1	2	3	4	5	6	7	8	9	10	11	12	13	Final
Sports Network	23	25	23	19	20	21	16	17	14	13	12	18	14	12	16
Coaches	20	23	22	17	18	16	13	14	13	12	10	16	14	12	16
