= 2013 North Carolina A&T Aggies football team =

American college football season

2013 North Carolina A&T Aggies football
- Conference: Mid-Eastern Athletic Conference
- Record: 7–4 (4–4 MEAC)
- Head coach: Rod Broadway (3rd season)
- Offensive coordinator: Rickey Bustle (1st season)
- Defensive coordinator: Sam Washington (3rd season)
- Home stadium: Aggie Stadium

2013 Mid-Eastern Athletic Conference football standings
	Conf.			Overall
Team	W		L	W		L
No. 16 Bethune–Cookman +^	7	–	1	10	–	3
No. 25 South Carolina State +^	7	–	1	9	–	4
Morgan State	5	–	3	5	–	7
Delaware State	5	–	3	5	–	6
North Carolina A&T	4	–	4	7	–	4
Howard	4	–	4	6	–	6
Hampton	4	–	4	4	–	8
North Carolina Central	3	–	5	5	–	7
Norfolk State	3	–	5	3	–	9
Florida A&M	2	–	6	3	–	9
Savannah State	0	–	8	1	–	11
+ – Conference co-champions; ^ – FCS playoff participant; Savannah State ineligible for FCS playoffs due to Academic Progress Rate sanctions; Rankings from The Sports Network poll

The 2013 North Carolina A&T Aggies football team represented North Carolina A&T State University as a member of Mid-Eastern Athletic Conference (MEAC) during the 2013 NCAA Division I FCS football season. Led by third-year head coach Rod Broadway, the Aggies compiled an overall record of 7–4 with a mark of 4–4 in conference play, placing in a three-way tie for fifth in the MEAC. North Carolina A&T played home games at Aggie Stadium in Greensboro, North Carolina.

The Aggies entered the 2013 season having been picked to finish second in the conference at MEAC Media Day. The team also had a new offensive coordinator, Rickey Bustle.

== Schedule ==
Date	Time	Opponent	Site	TV	Result	Attendance
September 7	6:00 pm	at No. 21 Appalachian State*	Kidd Brewer Stadium; Boone, NC		W 24–21	25,723
September 14	6:00 pm	Elon*	Aggie Stadium; Greensboro, NC		W 23–10	13,221
September 26	7:30 pm	Howard	Aggie Stadium; Greensboro, NC	ESPNU	W 27–19	16,011
October 5	4:00 pm	vs. South Carolina State	Georgia Dome; Atlanta, GA (Atlanta Football Classic, rivalry)	ESPN3*	L 24–29	35,412
October 12	2:00 pm	at Hampton	Armstrong Stadium; Hampton, VA		L 26–31	8,500
October 19	1:00 pm	Delaware State	Aggie Stadium; Greensboro, NC		L 7–12	7,327
October 26	2:00 pm	at Florida A&M	Bragg Memorial Stadium; Tallahassee, FL		W 20–13 ^{OT}	9,209
November 2	1:00 pm	Virginia–Lynchburg*^{†}	Aggie Stadium; Greensboro, NC		W 59–12	21,500
November 9	1:00 pm	at Morgan State	Hughes Stadium; Baltimore, MD		L 23–24	6,478
November 16	1:00 pm	Savannah State	Aggie Stadium; Greensboro, NC		W 41–14	7,332
November 23	1:00 pm	North Carolina Central	Aggie Stadium; Greensboro, NC (rivalry)		W 28–0	16,052
*Non-conference game; ^{†}Homecoming; Rankings from The Sports Network Poll released prior to the game; All times are in Eastern time

*Game aired on ESPNU on a tape delayed basis

== Coaching staff ==
2013 North Carolina A&T Aggies coaching staff
Head coach: Head coach – Rod Broadway; Offensive coaches: Offensive Coordinator - Rickey Bustle; Running Backs - Shawn Gibbs; Defensive coaches: Defensive coordinator/defensive backs – Sam Washington; Defensive line – Courtney Coard; Quality Control — Charles Cheek; Inside linebackers — John Gutekunst	Administrative staff: Athletic Director (A.D.) - Earl M. Hilton III; Administrative Support Associate for Football - Zanetta Thompson

== Game summaries ==
=== Appalachian State ===
North Carolina A&T vs. Appalachian State – Game Summary

Quarter	1	2	3	4	Total
Aggies	14	7	0	3	24
#21 Mountaineers	6	0	0	15	21

at Kidd Brewer Stadium, Boone, North Carolina

- Date: September 7, 2013
- Game time: 6:00 PM EDT
- Game weather: 74 °F (23 °C), Sunny
- Game attendance: 25,723
- Referee: Rodney Burnette
- TV: ASTV

Game information

First quarter

- NCAT - Tarik Cohen 5 yard run, 4:22 (NCAT 0—7)

Second quarter

- NCAT - Tarik Cohen 7 yard run, 11:40 (NCAT 0—14)
- NCAT - Denzel Jones Safety, 10:43 (NCAT 0—16)
- NCAT - Caleb Gabriel 16 yard pass from Lamar Raynard, 10:20 (NCAT 0—23)
- SHAW - Dwigh Campbell 85 yard interception return, 2:54 (NCAT 7—23)
- NCAT - Denzel Keyes 15 yard pass from Lamar Raynard, 00:30 (NCAT 7—30)

Third quarter

- NCAT - Caleb Gabriel 92 yard kickoff return, 14:45 (NCAT 7—37)
- NCAT - Denzel Keyes 2 yard pass from Lamar Raynard, 05:08 (NCAT 7—44)
- NCAT - Cody Jones 42 yard field goal, 00:53 (NCAT 7—47)

Fourth quarter

- NCAT - Lamar Raynard 9 yard run, 10:32 (NCAT 7—54)
- NCAT - Marquis Willis 32 yard interception return, 00:21 (NCAT 7—61)

Top Passer

- Lamar Raynard (NCAT) – 14/27, 188 YDS 3 TD

Top Rusher

- Tarik Cohen (NCAT) – 21 CAR, 106 YDS 2 TD

Top Receiver

- Denzel Keyes (NCAT) – 6 REC, 119 YDS 2 TD

This game marked the 21st meeting overall between the Shaw University Bears and the Aggies, and the first between the two in 52 Years. Going into the match up, the Aggies held the all-time series at 3-17-1. The last meeting between the two in 1968, saw The Aggies defeat the Bears 0-69.

The Aggies called upon redshirt freshman quarterback Lamar Raynard to be the starting quarterback. Raynard passed for 188 yards with three touchdowns and 1 interception. Preseason All-American & MEAC Offensive player of the year, running back Tarik Cohen, ran for 106 yards and two touchdowns on 21 carries. This game marked Cohen's 13th career 100-yard game. Cohen is now 928 rushing yards short of becoming the all-time leading rusher in school history.

== 2014 NFL draft ==
The 2014 NFL draft was held on May 8–10, 2013 at Radio City Music Hall in New York City. The following A&T players were either selected or signed as undrafted free agents following the draft.

Player	Position	Round	Overall pick	NFL team
Deji Olatoye	CB	—-	Undrafted FA	Baltimore Ravens
