= 2013 Savannah State Tigers football team =

American college football season

2013 Savannah State Tigers football
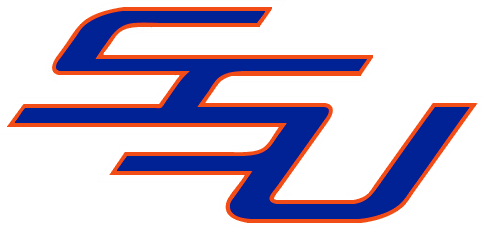
- Conference: Mid-Eastern Athletic Conference
- Record: 1–11 (0–8 MEAC)
- Head coach: Earnest Wilson (1st season)
- Defensive coordinator: Corey Barlow (1st season)
- Home stadium: Ted A. Wright Stadium

2013 Mid-Eastern Athletic Conference football standings
	Conf.			Overall
Team	W		L	W		L
No. 16 Bethune–Cookman +^	7	–	1	10	–	3
No. 25 South Carolina State +^	7	–	1	9	–	4
Morgan State	5	–	3	5	–	7
Delaware State	5	–	3	5	–	6
North Carolina A&T	4	–	4	7	–	4
Howard	4	–	4	6	–	6
Hampton	4	–	4	4	–	8
North Carolina Central	3	–	5	5	–	7
Norfolk State	3	–	5	3	–	9
Florida A&M	2	–	6	3	–	9
Savannah State	0	–	8	1	–	11
+ – Conference co-champions; ^ – FCS playoff participant; Savannah State ineligible for FCS playoffs due to Academic Progress Rate sanctions; Rankings from The Sports Network poll

The 2013 Savannah State Tigers football team represented Savannah State University in the 2013 NCAA Division I FCS football season. The Tigers are members of the Mid-Eastern Athletic Conference (MEAC). This was their first season under the guidance of head coach Earnest Wilson, and the Tigers played their home games at Ted Wright Stadium. They finished the season 1–11, 0–8 in MEAC play to finish in last place.

== Coaches and support staff ==
Savannah State will go into the 2013 season with a completely new staff. On April 17, athletic director Sterling Steward Jr. announced that only cornerbacks coach Corey Barlow would return for the 2013 season. Barlow became the interim head coach until Savannah State announced the hiring of Coach Wilson on June 7, 2013.

== Media ==
Radio flagship: WHCJ
Broadcasters: Toby Hyde (play-by-play), Curtis Foster (analyst)

== Schedule ==
Date	Time	Opponent	Site	TV	Result	Attendance
August 31	6:00 pm	at No. 9 Georgia Southern*	Paulson Stadium; Statesboro, GA		L 9–77	16,528
September 7	7:00 pm	at Troy*	Veterans Memorial Stadium; Troy, AL	ESPN3	L 3–66	20,021
September 14	6:00 pm	Fort Valley State*	Ted Wright Stadium; Savannah, GA	WGSA	W 27–20	3,220
September 21	7:00 pm	at No. 16 (FBS) Miami (FL)*	Sun Life Stadium; Miami Gardens, FL	ESPN3	L 7–77	42,571
September 28	6:00 pm	Delaware State	Ted Wright Stadium; Savannah, GA		L 22–24	2,350
October 5	6:00 pm	at Norfolk State	William "Dick" Price Stadium; Norfolk, VA		L 24–26	6,272
October 12	6:00 pm	Florida A&M	Ted Wright Stadium; Savannah, GA	WGSA	L 14–27	5,620
October 19	4:00 pm	at No. 17 Bethune-Cookman	Municipal Stadium; Daytona Beach, FL		L 21–48	4,693
October 26	2:00 pm	North Carolina Central^{†}	Ted Wright Stadium; Savannah, GA	WGSA	L 10–24	5,450
November 2	5:00 pm	South Carolina State	Ted Wright Stadium; Savannah, GA	SSAA	L 9–45	2,630
November 9	1:00 pm	at Howard	William H. Greene Stadium; Washington, DC		L 14–42	3,053
November 16	1:00 pm	at North Carolina A&T	Aggie Stadium; Greensboro, NC		L 14–41	7,332
*Non-conference game; ^{†}Homecoming; Rankings from The Sports Network Poll released prior to the game; All times are in Eastern time

== Game summaries ==
=== Georgia Southern ===
Quarter	1	2	3	4	Total
Tigers	0	0	9	0	9
#9 Eagles	7	21	21	28	77

at Paulson Stadium; Statesboro, Georgia

=== Troy ===
Quarter	1	2	3	4	Total
Tigers	0	3	0	0	3
Trojans	17	7	28	14	66

at Veterans Memorial Stadium; Troy, Alabama

- TV: ESPN3

=== Fort Valley State ===
Quarter	1	2	3	4	Total
Wildcats	7	6	7	0	20
Tigers	0	13	0	14	27

at Ted Wright Stadium; Savannah, Georgia

- Game attendance: 3,220
- TV: WGSA

=== Miami ===
Quarter	1	2	3	4	Total
Tigers	0	0	7	0	7
#16 (FBS) Hurricanes	21	28	28	0	77

at Sun Life Stadium; Miami, Florida

=== Delaware State ===
Quarter	1	2	3	4	Total
Hornets	0	7	10	7	24
Tigers	0	9	0	13	22

at Ted Wright Stadium; Savannah, Georgia

- Game time: 6 pm
- Game weather: Partly Sunny
- Game attendance: 2,350
- TV: WGSA

=== Norfolk State ===
Quarter	1	2	3	4	Total
Tigers	0	9	6	9	24
Spartans	0	10	7	9	26

at Dick Price Stadium; Norfolk, Virginia

- Game time: 1 pm
- Game weather: Sunny and warm
- Game attendance: 6,772

=== Florida A&M ===
Quarter	1	2	3	4	Total
Rattlers	13	7	0	7	27
Tigers	0	7	0	7	14

at Ted Wright Stadium; Savannah, Georgia

- TV: WGSA

=== Bethune-Cookman ===
Quarter	1	2	3	4	Total
Tigers	0	7	0	14	21
#17 Wildcats	21	21	0	6	48

at Municipal Stadium; Daytona Beach, Florida

=== North Carolina Central ===
Quarter	1	2	3	4	Total
Eagles	7	7	7	3	24
Tigers	3	7	0	0	10

at Ted Wright Stadium; Savannah, Georgia

- TV: WGSA

=== South Carolina State ===
Quarter	1	2	3	4	Total
Bulldogs	7	14	14	10	45
Tigers	6	3	0	0	9

at Ted Wright Stadium; Savannah, Georgia

=== Howard ===
Quarter	1	2	3	4	Total
Tigers	0	20	15	7	42
Bison	7	0	7	0	14

at William H. Greene Stadium; Washington, District of Columbia

=== North Carolina A&T ===
Quarter	1	2	3	4	Total
Tigers	0	0	7	7	14
Aggies	21	14	0	6	41

at Aggie Stadium; Greensboro, North Carolina
