= 2013 South Carolina State Bulldogs football team =

American college football season

2013 South Carolina State Bulldogs football
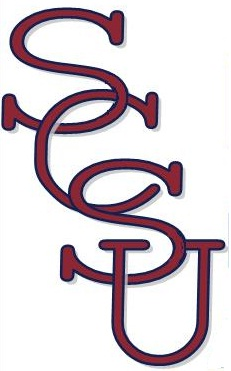

MEAC co-champion

FCS Playoffs First Round, L 20–30 vs. Furman
- Conference: Mid-Eastern Athletic Conference

Ranking
- Sports Network: No. 25
- Record: 9–4 (7–1 MEAC)
- Head coach: Oliver Pough (12th season)
- Offensive coordinator: Joseph Blackwell (5th season)
- Defensive coordinator: Mike Adams (6th season)
- Home stadium: Oliver C. Dawson Stadium

2013 Mid-Eastern Athletic Conference football standings
	Conf.			Overall
Team	W		L	W		L
No. 16 Bethune–Cookman +^	7	–	1	10	–	3
No. 25 South Carolina State +^	7	–	1	9	–	4
Morgan State	5	–	3	5	–	7
Delaware State	5	–	3	5	–	6
North Carolina A&T	4	–	4	7	–	4
Howard	4	–	4	6	–	6
Hampton	4	–	4	4	–	8
North Carolina Central	3	–	5	5	–	7
Norfolk State	3	–	5	3	–	9
Florida A&M	2	–	6	3	–	9
Savannah State	0	–	8	1	–	11
+ – Conference co-champions; ^ – FCS playoff participant; Savannah State ineligible for FCS playoffs due to Academic Progress Rate sanctions; Rankings from The Sports Network poll

The 2013 South Carolina State Bulldogs football team represented South Carolina State University in the 2013 NCAA Division I FCS football season. They were led by 12th year head coach Oliver Pough and played their home games at Oliver C. Dawson Stadium. They were a member of the Mid-Eastern Athletic Conference. They finished the season 9–4, 7–1 in MEAC play to win a share of the MEAC championship with Bethune-Cookman. Due to their loss to Bethune-Cookman, they did not receive the conference's automatic bid to the FCS Playoffs. However, they did receive an at-large bid to the FCS Playoffs where they lost in the first round to Furman.

== Schedule ==
Date	Time	Opponent	Rank	Site	TV	Result	Attendance
August 31	6:00 pm	No. 25 Coastal Carolina*		Oliver C. Dawson Stadium; Orangeburg, SC		L 20–27	10,048
September 7	12:30 pm	at No. 4 (FBS) Clemson*		Memorial Stadium; Clemson, SC	ACCRSN	L 13–52	81,428
September 14	6:00 pm	Alabama A&M*		Oliver C. Dawson Stadium; Orangeburg, SC		W 32–0	11,146
September 21	4:00 pm	vs. Benedict College*		Williams-Brice Stadium; Columbia, SC (Palmetto Capital City Classic)		W 59–6	15,037
September 28	2:00 pm	Hampton		Oliver C. Dawson Stadium; Orangeburg, SC	ESPN3	W 30–6	17,139
October 5	4:00 pm	vs. North Carolina A&T		Georgia Dome; Atlanta, GA (Atlanta Football Classic)	ESPN3	W 29–24	35,412
October 10	7:30 pm	at North Carolina Central		O'Kelly-Riddick Stadium; Durham, NC	ESPNU	W 44–3	8,103
October 26	4:00 pm	at No. 14 Bethune-Cookman		Municipal Stadium; Daytona Beach, FL		L 3–14	10,421
November 2	1:00 pm	at Savannah State		Ted Wright Stadium; Savannah, GA		W 45–9	2,630
November 9	1:30 pm	Florida A&M^{†}		Oliver C. Dawson Stadium; Orangeburg, SC		W 25–21	20,022
November 14	7:30 pm	Morgan State		Oliver C. Dawson Stadium; Orangeburg, SC	ESPNU	W 38–3	8,053
November 23	7:30 pm	at Norfolk State		William "Dick" Price Stadium; Norfolk, VA		W 17–3	5,639
November 30	1:00 pm	Furman*	No. 25	Oliver C. Dawson Stadium; Orangeburg, SC (FCS Playoffs First Round)	ESPN3	L 20–30	4,871
*Non-conference game; ^{†}Homecoming; Rankings from The Sports Network Poll released prior to the game; All times are in Eastern time

- Source: Schedule
