= 2013 North Carolina Central Eagles football team =

American college football season

2013 North Carolina Central Eagles football
- Conference: Mid-Eastern Athletic Conference
- Record: 5–7 (3–5 MEAC)
- Head coach: Dwayne Foster (interim, 1st season)
- Offensive coordinator: Michael Bryant (3rd season)
- Defensive coordinator: John Morgan Jr. (3rd season)
- Home stadium: O'Kelly–Riddick Stadium

2013 Mid-Eastern Athletic Conference football standings
| | Conf. | | | Overall |
| Team | W | | L | W | | L |
|---|---|---|---|---|---|---|
| No. 16 Bethune–Cookman +^ | 7 | – | 1 | 10 | – | 3 |
| No. 25 South Carolina State +^ | 7 | – | 1 | 9 | – | 4 |
| Morgan State | 5 | – | 3 | 5 | – | 7 |
| Delaware State | 5 | – | 3 | 5 | – | 6 |
| North Carolina A&T | 4 | – | 4 | 7 | – | 4 |
| Howard | 4 | – | 4 | 6 | – | 6 |
| Hampton | 4 | – | 4 | 4 | – | 8 |
| North Carolina Central | 3 | – | 5 | 5 | – | 7 |
| Norfolk State | 3 | – | 5 | 3 | – | 9 |
| Florida A&M | 2 | – | 6 | 3 | – | 9 |
| Savannah State | 0 | – | 8 | 1 | – | 11 |
+ – Conference co-champions; ^ – FCS playoff participant; Savannah State ineligible for FCS playoffs due to Academic Progress Rate sanctions; Rankings from The Sports Network poll

The 2013 North Carolina Central Eagles football team represented North Carolina Central University as a member of the Mid-Eastern Athletic Conference (MEAC) during the 2013 NCAA Division I FCS football season. Led by interim head coach Dwayne Foster, the Eagles compiled an overall record of 5–7 with a mark of 3–5, tying for eighth place in the MEAC. North Carolina Central played home games at O'Kelly–Riddick Stadium in Durham, North Carolina.

Foster was appointed interim head coach after Henry Frazier, III was fired following a domestic dispute on August 22, 2013.

== Schedule ==
| Date | Time | Opponent | Site | TV | Result | Attendance |
|---|---|---|---|---|---|---|
| August 31 | 4:00 pm | at Duke* | Wallace Wade Stadium; Durham, NC (Bull City Gridiron Classic) | ESPN3 | L 0–45 | 22,521 |
| September 7 | 2:00 pm | St. Augustine's* | O'Kelly–Riddick Stadium; Durham, NC | EV | W 23–20 ^{2OT} | 7,136 |
| September 14 | 12:00 pm | at Charlotte* | Jerry Richardson Stadium; Charlotte, NC | WCCB | W 40–13 | 16,630 |
| September 21 | 2:00 pm | No. 4 Towson* | O'Kelly–Riddick Stadium; Durham, NC | EV | L 17–35 | 4,037 |
| October 5 | 1:00 pm | at Howard | William H. Greene Stadium; Washington, DC | | W 37–28 | 5,101 |
| October 10 | 7:30 pm | South Carolina State | O'Kelly–Riddick Stadium; Durham, NC | ESPNU | L 3–44 | 8,103 |
| October 19 | 2:00 pm | Morgan State^{†} | O'Kelly–Riddick Stadium; Durham, NC | EV | L 22–34 | 11,763 |
| October 26 | 2:00 pm | at Savannah State | Ted Wright Stadium; Savannah, GA | WGSA | W 24–10 | 5,450 |
| November 2 | 2:00 pm | No. 13 Bethune-Cookman | O'Kelly–Riddick Stadium; Durham, NC | ESPNews | L 14–38 | 6,411 |
| November 9 | 1:00 pm | at Hampton | Armstrong Stadium; Hampton, VA | | L 21–29 | 2,800 |
| November 16 | 2:00 pm | Norfolk State | O'Kelly–Riddick Stadium; Durham, NC | EV | W 24–13 | 6,108 |
| November 17 | 1:00 pm | at North Carolina A&T | Aggie Stadium; Greensboro, NC (rivalry) | | L 0–28 | 16,052 |
*Non-conference game; ^{†}Homecoming; Rankings from The Sports Network Poll released prior to the game; All times are in Eastern time
