= 2013 Texas Southern Tigers football team =

American college football season

2013 Texas Southern Tigers football
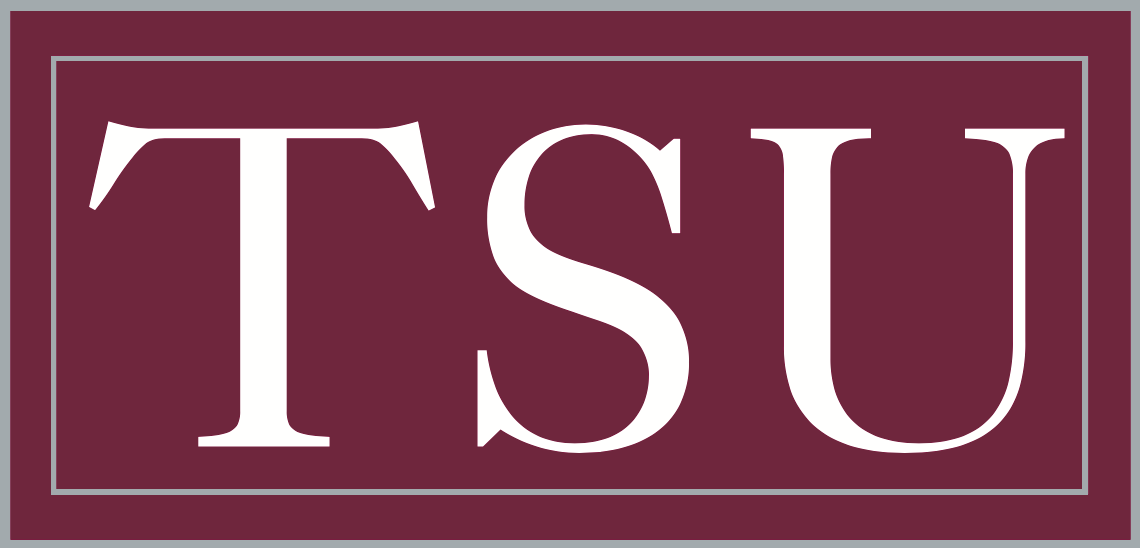
- Conference: Southwestern Athletic Conference
- West Division
- Record: 2–9 (2–7 SWAC)
- Head coach: Darrell Asberry (2nd season)
- Offensive coordinator: Darrell Asberry (2nd season)
- Defensive coordinator: Michael Vite (1st season)
- Home stadium: BBVA Compass Stadium

2013 Southwestern Athletic Conference football standings
	Conf.			Overall
Team	W		L	W		L
East Division
Jackson State xy	8	–	1	8	–	4
Alcorn State	7	–	2	9	–	3
Alabama State *	7	–	2	8	–	4
Alabama A&M	4	–	5	4	–	8
Mississippi Valley State *	2	–	7	2	–	9
West Division
Southern xy$	7	–	2	9	–	4
Prairie View A&M	5	–	4	6	–	6
Arkansas–Pine Bluff	2	–	7	2	–	9
Texas Southern *	2	–	7	2	–	9
Grambling State	1	–	8	1	–	11
Championship: Southern 34, Jackson State 27 ^{2OT}
$ – Conference champion; x – Division champion/co-champions; y – Championship game participant; * – ineligible for postseason

The 2013 Texas Southern Tigers football team represented Texas Southern University a member of the West Division of the Southwestern Athletic Conference (SWAC) during the 2013 NCAA Division I FCS football season. Led by second-year head coach Darrell Asberry, the Tigers compiled an overall record of 2–9 with a mark of 2–7 in conference play, placing fourth in the SWAC's West Division. Texas Southern played home games at BBVA Compass Stadium in Houston.

Texas Southern was ineligible for the SWAC championship due to NCAA recruiting and academic violations.

== Schedule ==
Date	Time	Opponent	Site	TV	Result	Attendance
August 31	7:00 pm	Prairie View A&M	BBVA Compass Stadium; Houston, TX (Labor Day Classic)	KHOU-DT2	L 13–37	18,361
September 14	6:00 pm	at No. 5 Sam Houston State*	Bowers Stadium; Huntsville, TX	CSNH	L 17–55	6,403
September 19	6:30 pm	at Jackson State	Mississippi Veterans Memorial Stadium; Jackson, MS	ESPNU	L 7–35	13,801
September 28	6:00 pm	at Alabama A&M	Louis Crews Stadium; Huntsville, AL		L 10–12	7,267
October 5	6:00 pm	Alabama State	BBVA Compass Stadium; Houston, TX	KHOU-DT2	L 2–34	2,186
October 12	6:00 pm	at Arkansas–Pine Bluff	Golden Lion Stadium; Pine Bluff, AR		W 41–28	4,491
October 19	2:00 pm	Alcorn State^{†}	BBVA Compass Stadium; Houston, TX	KHOU-DT2	L 13–20	4,582
October 26	2:00 pm	at Grambling State	Eddie Robinson Stadium; Grambling, LA		W 23–17 ^{OT}	7,670
November 1	8:00 pm	Southern	BBVA Compass Stadium; Houston, TX	KHOU-DT2	L 24–31	6,406
November 9	1:00 pm	at Mississippi Valley State	Rice–Totten Field; Itta Bena, MS		L 17–20	2,706
November 16	2:00 pm	Howard*	BBVA Compass Stadium; Houston, TX	KHOU-DT2	L 6–40	1,562
*Non-conference game; ^{†}Homecoming; Rankings from The Sports Network Poll released prior to the game; All times are in Central time

== Game summaries ==
=== Prairie View A&M ===
Prairie View A&M at Texas Southern

Team	1	2	3	4	Total
• Panthers	13	7	7	10	37
Tigers	10	3	0	0	13

- Date: August 31
- Location: BBVA Compass Stadium
  Houston, TX
- Game start: 7:05 PM CST
- Elapsed time: 3:10
- Game attendance: 18,361
- Game weather: 96 °F (36 °C), Clear & Humid, winds @ 5mph
- Referee: Eddie Kelley
- TV announcers (KHOU-DT2): Nick Strong and Dejuan Fulgham

Scoring summary
1	12:20	PVAM	Johnta Hebert 2-yard touchdown run, Amir Smith rush failed	PVAM 6–0
1	10:21	TXSOFB	Dedric Shipman 30-yard touchdown pass from Homer Causey, Eric Medina kick good	TXSOFB 7–6
1	7:13	PVAM	De'Auntre Smiley 2-yard touchdown run, Christopher Barrick kick good	PVAM 13–7
1	3:42	TXSOFB	Eric Medina 18-yard Field Goal	PVAM 13–10
2	8:50	TXSOFB	Eric Medina 34-yard Field Goal	Tied 13–13
2	0:54	PVAM	Courtney Brown 4-yard touchdown run, Christopher Barrick kick good	PVAM 20–13
3	10:39	PVAM	Greg Thurmond 29-yard touchdown pass from Jerry Lovelock, Christopher Barrick kick good	PVAM 27–13
4	8:50	PVAM	Christopher Barrick 37-yard Field Goal	PVAM 30–13
4	3:50	PVAM	Courtney Brown 8-yard touchdown run, Christopher Barrick kick good	PVAM 37–13

=== Sam Houston State ===
Texas Southern at Sam Houston State

Team	1	2	3	4	Total
Tigers	0	3	7	7	17
• #5 Bearkats	0	27	14	14	55

- Date: September 14
- Location: Bowers Stadium
  Huntsville, TX
- Game start: 2:07 PM CST
- Elapsed time: 3:07
- Game attendance: 6,403
- Referee: D Alvarez
- TV announcers (CSNH): Brett Dolan, Eddie Robinson Jr. & Bart Enis

Scoring summary
2	12:35	TXSOFB	Eric Medina 27-yard Field Goal	TXSOFB 3–0
2	5:52	SHSU	Timothy Flanders 2-yard touchdown run, Luc Swimberghe kick good	SHSU 7–3
2	4:35	SHSU	Torrance Williams 6-yard touchdown pass from Brian Bell, Luc Swimberghe kick good	SHSU 14–3
2	1:15	SHSU	Brian Bell 3-yard touchdown run, Luc Swimberghe kick good	SHSU 21–3
2	0:19	SHSU	Timothy Flanders 1-yard touchdown run, Luc Swimberghe kick failed	SHSU 27–3
3	10:11	SHSU	Shane Young 5-yard touchdown pass from Brian Bell, Luc Swimberghe kick good	SHSU 34–3
3	4:52	SHSU	Keshawn Hill 23-yard touchdown run, Luc Swimberghe kick good	SHSU 41–3
3	4:04	TXSOFB	Daveonn Porter 50-yard touchdown run, Eric Medina kick good	SHSU 41–10
4	14:55	SHSU	Ragan Henderson 5-yard touchdown pass from Don King III, Luc Swimberghe kick good	SHSU 48–10
4	11:12	TXSOFB	Homer Causey 10-yard touchdown run, Eric Medina kick good	SHSU 48–17
4	8:13	SHSU	Ryan Wilson 1-yard touchdown run, Luc Swimberghe kick good	SHSU 55–17

=== Jackson State ===
Texas Southern at Jackson State

Team	1	2	3	4	Total
TSU Tigers	0	7	0	0	7
• JSU Tigers	7	7	14	7	35

- Date: September 19
- Location: Mississippi Veterans Memorial Stadium
  Jackson, MS
- Game start: 6:32 PM CST
- Elapsed time: 3:25
- Game attendance: 13,801
- Game weather: 90 °F (32 °C), Sunny & Humid
- Referee: George McCullum
- TV announcers (ESPNU): Mark Neely and Jay Walker

Scoring summary
1	5:20	J-STATE	Clayton Moore 2-yard touchdown run, Ryan Deising kick good	J-STATE 7–0
2	3:57	TXSOFB	Daveonn Porter 2-yard Touchdown run, Eric Medina kick good	Tied 7–7
2	0:23	J-STATE	Javancy Jones blocked punt returned for touchdown, Ryan Deising kick good	J-STATE 14–7
3	5:42	J-STATE	Rakeem Sims 2-yard touchdown run, Ryan Deising kick good	J-STATE 21–7
3	0:32	J-STATE	Rakeem Sims 1-yard touchdown run, Ryan Deising kick good	J-STATE 28–7
4	10:30	J_STATE	Stedmon Capler 2-yard touchdown run, Ryan Deising kick good	J-STATE 35–7

=== Alabama A&M ===
Texas Southern at Alabama A&M

Team	1	2	3	4	Total
Tigers	0	3	7	0	10
• Bulldogs	6	0	0	6	12

- Date: September 28
- Location: Louis Crews Stadium
  Huntsville, AL

=== Alabama State ===
Alabama State at Texas Southern

Team	1	2	3	4	Total
Hornets	0	0	0	0	0
Tigers	0	0	0	0	0

- Date: October 5
- Location: BBVA Compass Stadium
  Houston, TX
- TV announcers (KHOU-DT2): Nick Strong & Dejuan Fulgham

=== Arkansas–Pine Bluff ===
Texas Southern at Arkansas–Pine Bluff

Team	1	2	3	4	Total
• Tigers	17	7	7	10	41
Golden Lions	7	7	0	14	28

- Date: October 12
- Location: Golden Lion Stadium
  Pine Bluff, AR

=== Alcorn State ===
Alcorn State at Texas Southern

Team	1	2	3	4	Total
• Braves	6	7	0	7	20
Tigers	7	6	0	0	13

- Date: October 19
- Location: BBVA Compass Stadium
  Houston, TX
- TV announcers (KHOU-DT2): Nick Strong & Dejuan Fulgham

=== Grambling State ===
Texas Southern at Grambling State

Team	1	2	3	4	OT	Total
• TSU Tigers	7	3	0	7	6	23
GSU Tigers	14	3	0	0	0	17

- Date: October 26
- Location: Eddie Robinson Stadium
  Grambling, LA

=== Southern ===
Southern at Texas Southern

Team	1	2	3	4	Total
• Jaguars	0	21	0	10	31
Tigers	3	7	0	14	24

- Date: November 2
- Location: BBVA Compass Stadium
  Houston, TX
- TV announcers (KHOU-DT2): Nick Strong & Dejuan Fulgham

=== Mississippi Valley State ===
Texas Southern at Mississippi Valley State

Team	1	2	3	4	Total
Tigers	0	10	0	7	17
• Delta Devils	7	13	0	0	20

- Date: November 9
- Location: Rice–Totten Field
  Itta Bena, MS

=== Howard ===
Howard at Texas Southern

Team	1	2	3	4	Total
• Bison	7	23	0	10	40
Tigers	3	3	0	0	6

- Date: November 16
- Location: BBVA Compass Stadium
  Houston, TX
- Game attendance: 1,562
- TV announcers (KHOU-DT2): Nick Strong & Dejuan Fulgham

== Media ==
Every Texas Southern football game was carried live on KTSU 90.9 FM. Select games were shown live on an ESPN network or KHOU. Most KHOU broadcasts were aired on tape-delay on Comcast SportsNet Houston.
