= 2013 Morgan State Bears football team =

American college football season

2013 Morgan State Bears football
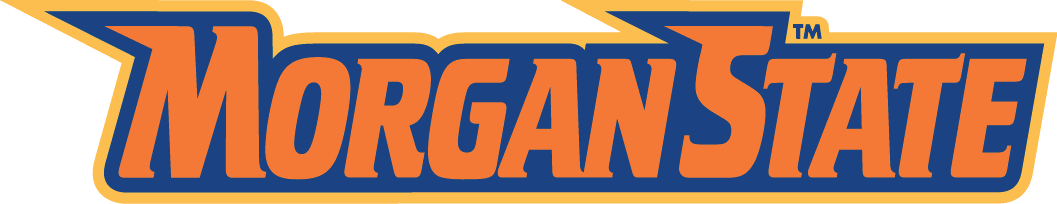
- Conference: Mid-Eastern Athletic Conference
- Record: 5–7 (5–3 MEAC)
- Head coach: Donald Hill-Eley (13th season)
- Offensive coordinator: Greg Gregory (1st season)
- Defensive coordinator: Jerry Holmes (1st season)
- Home stadium: Hughes Stadium

2013 Mid-Eastern Athletic Conference football standings
	Conf.			Overall
Team	W		L	W		L
No. 16 Bethune–Cookman +^	7	–	1	10	–	3
No. 25 South Carolina State +^	7	–	1	9	–	4
Morgan State	5	–	3	5	–	7
Delaware State	5	–	3	5	–	6
North Carolina A&T	4	–	4	7	–	4
Howard	4	–	4	6	–	6
Hampton	4	–	4	4	–	8
North Carolina Central	3	–	5	5	–	7
Norfolk State	3	–	5	3	–	9
Florida A&M	2	–	6	3	–	9
Savannah State	0	–	8	1	–	11
+ – Conference co-champions; ^ – FCS playoff participant; Savannah State ineligible for FCS playoffs due to Academic Progress Rate sanctions; Rankings from The Sports Network poll

The 2013 Morgan State Bears football team represented Morgan State University in the 2013 NCAA Division I FCS football season. They were led by 13th-year head coach Donald Hill-Eley and played their home games at Hughes Stadium. They were a member of the Mid-Eastern Athletic Conference (MEAC).

Morgan State entered the 2013 with a new coordinators on both sides of the ball. Greg Gregory joined the team as the new offensive coordinator. Gregory came to Morgan State after being out of football in 2012. He was the offensive coordinator at the University of South Alabama from 2009 to 2011 and has previously been a head coach at Missouri Southern State University from 1998 to 1999. Jerry Holmes joined as the defensive coordinator. Holmes previously served as head coach at Hampton University in 2008 and has coached as defensive coordinator for the Cleveland Browns (1999–2000), Washington Redskins (2001), San Diego Chargers (2002–2003), and Hampton (2004–2007).

The Bears entered the 2013 season having been picked to finish ninth in the 2013 season. Morgan State hoped to prove those predictions wrong with their 3-second All-MEAC Pre-season members.

They finished the season 5–7, 5–3 in MEAC play to finish in a tie for third place. At the end of the season, Hill-Eley was fired.

== Schedule ==
Date	Time	Opponent	Site	TV	Result	Attendance
August 30	7:00 pm	at Army*	Michie Stadium; West Point, NY	CBSSN	L 12–28	24,245
September 7	12:00 pm	at Robert Morris*	Joe Walton Stadium; Moon Township, PA		L 14–31	1,485
September 14	7:00 pm	at Liberty*	Williams Stadium; Lynchburg, VA	LFSN	L 10–38	15,488
September 21	7:00 pm	at Western Kentucky*	Houchens Industries–L. T. Smith Stadium; Bowling Green, KY		L 17–58	20,973
September 28	1:00 pm	Norfolk State	Hughes Stadium; Baltimore, MD		L 21–27	856
October 5	1:00 pm	Florida A&M^{†}	Hughes Stadium; Baltimore, MD		W 34–21	1,259
October 19	2:00 pm	at North Carolina Central	O'Kelly–Riddick Stadium; Durham, NC		W 34–22	11,763
October 26	1:00 pm	at Howard	William H. Greene Stadium; Washington, D.C. (Rivalry)		L 14–28	7,053
November 2	1:00 pm	Hampton	Hughes Stadium; Baltimore, MD		W 30–27	5,789
November 9	1:00 pm	Norfth Carolina A&T	Hughes Stadium; Baltimore, MD		W 24–23	6,478
November 14	7:30 pm	at South Carolina State	Oliver C. Dawson Stadium; Orangeburg, SC	ESPNU	L 3–38	8,053
November 23	2:00 pm	at Delaware State	Alumni Stadium; Dover, DE		W 31–26	1,394
*Non-conference game; ^{†}Homecoming; All times are in Eastern time

- Source: Schedule
