= 2013 Mississippi Valley State Delta Devils football team =

American college football season

2013 Mississippi Valley State Delta Devils football
- Conference: Southwestern Athletic Conference
- East Division
- Record: 2–9 (2–7 SWAC)
- Head coach: Karl Morgan (4th season)
- Offensive coordinator: Alex Jackson (1st season)
- Defensive coordinator: Karl Morgan (4th season)
- Home stadium: Rice–Totten Stadium

2013 Southwestern Athletic Conference football standings
	Conf.			Overall
Team	W		L	W		L
East Division
Jackson State xy	8	–	1	8	–	4
Alcorn State	7	–	2	9	–	3
Alabama State *	7	–	2	8	–	4
Alabama A&M	4	–	5	4	–	8
Mississippi Valley State *	2	–	7	2	–	9
West Division
Southern xy$	7	–	2	9	–	4
Prairie View A&M	5	–	4	6	–	6
Arkansas–Pine Bluff	2	–	7	2	–	9
Texas Southern *	2	–	7	2	–	9
Grambling State	1	–	8	1	–	11
Championship: Southern 34, Jackson State 27 ^{2OT}
$ – Conference champion; x – Division champion/co-champions; y – Championship game participant; * – ineligible for postseason

The 2013 Mississippi Valley State Delta Devils football team represented Mississippi Valley State University as a member of the East Division of the Southwestern Athletic Conference (SWAC) during the 2013 NCAA Division I FCS football season. Led by Karl Morgan in his fourth and final season as head coach, the Delta Devils compiled an overall record of 2–9 and a mark of 2–7 in conference play, placing last out of five teams in the SWAC's East Division. Mississippi Valley State played home games at Rice–Totten Stadium in Itta Bena, Mississippi.

== Preseason ==
Mississippi Valley State entered the season with a new offensive coordinator, Alex Jackson, who was in his third season overall with the staff, after former offensive coordinator Ramon Flanigan became the head coach at Lincoln University. On media day, Mississippi Valley State State was picked to finish fourth in the Eastern Division of the SWAC. The team had two players, defensive lineman Robert Simpson and defensive back Kevin Euegene, selected to the Pre-Season All-SWAC 1st Team Defense. Two players, wide receiver Julian Staford and offensive lineman Antonio Griggs, were selected as part of the All-SWAC 2nd Team Offense.

== Schedule ==
Date	Time	Opponent	Site	TV	Result	Attendance
September 1	10:45 am	vs. Florida A&M*	Florida Citrus Bowl; Orlando, FL (MEAC/SWAC Challenge)	ESPNU	L 10–27	24,376
September 7	1:00 pm	Delta State*	Rice–Totten Stadium; Itta Bena, MS		L 14–24	2,139
September 14	2:00 pm	at Alcorn State	Casem-Spinks Stadium; Lorman, MS		L 28–35	2,565
September 21	1:00 pm	Southern	Rice–Totten Stadium; Itta Bena, MS		L 7–17	3,986
October 5	2:00 pm	at Alabama A&M	Louis Crews Stadium; Huntsville, AL		W 28–9	12,873
October 12	2:00 pm	Jackson State	Rice–Totten Stadium; Itta Bena, MS		L 17–26	10,042
October 19	2:00 pm	at Prairie View A&M	Edward L. Blackshear Field; Prairie View, TX		L 14–51	12,000
October 26	2:00 pm	Arkansas–Pine Bluff^{†}	Rice–Totten Stadium; Itta Bena, MS		L 18–38	8,632
November 2	2:00 pm	at Grambling State	Eddie Robinson Stadium; Grambling, LA		L 40–47	10,155
November 9	1:00 pm	Texas Southern	Rice–Totten Stadium; Itta Bena, MS		W 20–17	2,706
November 16	1:00 pm	Alabama State	Rice–Totten Stadium; Itta Bena, MS		L 7–19	1,873
*Non-conference game; ^{†}Homecoming; All times are in Central time

== Media ==
All Delta Devils games were carried live on WVSD radio and online through ChristianNetcast.
