= 2013 Howard Bison football team =

American college football season

2013 Howard Bison football
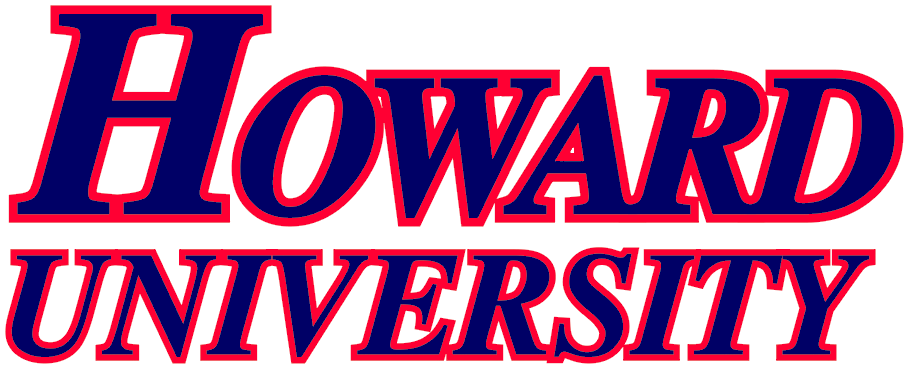
- Conference: Mid-Eastern Athletic Conference
- Record: 6–6 (4–4 MEAC)
- Head coach: Rayford Petty (interim, 6th season)
- Offensive coordinator: Ted White (3rd season)
- Defensive coordinator: Rayford Petty (3rd season)
- Home stadium: William H. Greene Stadium

2013 Mid-Eastern Athletic Conference football standings
	Conf.			Overall
Team	W		L	W		L
No. 16 Bethune–Cookman +^	7	–	1	10	–	3
No. 25 South Carolina State +^	7	–	1	9	–	4
Morgan State	5	–	3	5	–	7
Delaware State	5	–	3	5	–	6
North Carolina A&T	4	–	4	7	–	4
Howard	4	–	4	6	–	6
Hampton	4	–	4	4	–	8
North Carolina Central	3	–	5	5	–	7
Norfolk State	3	–	5	3	–	9
Florida A&M	2	–	6	3	–	9
Savannah State	0	–	8	1	–	11
+ – Conference co-champions; ^ – FCS playoff participant; Savannah State ineligible for FCS playoffs due to Academic Progress Rate sanctions; Rankings from The Sports Network poll

The 2013 Howard Bison football team represented Howard University as a member of the Mid-Eastern Athletic Conference (MEAC) during the 2013 NCAA Division I FCS football season. Led by Rayford Petty as interim head coach, the Bison compiled an overall record of 6–6 with a mark of 4–4, placing in a three-way tie for fifth in the MEAC. Howard played home games at William H. Greene Stadium in Washington, D.C. Petty had served as the team's head coach from 2002 to 2006, compiling a 25–30 record in five seasons. Head coach Gary Harrell, who had helmed the team in 2011 and 2012, took a leave of absence in 2013 and returned the following season.

Howard entered the season having been picked to finish eighth in the MEAC. Three Bison players were selected to the preseason all-MEAC first team and six players to the preseason second team.

== Schedule ==
Date	Time	Opponent	Site	TV	Result	Attendance
August 31	6:00 pm	at Eastern Michigan*	Rynearson Stadium; Ypsilanti, MI	ESPN3	L 24–34	7,668
September 7	3:30 pm	vs. Morehouse*	Robert F. Kennedy Memorial Stadium; Washington, DC (Nation's Football Classic)		W 27–16	17,012
September 14	6:00 pm	at Old Dominion*	Foreman Field; Norfolk, VA		L 19–76	20,118
September 26	7:30 pm	at North Carolina A&T	Aggie Stadium; Greensboro, NC	ESPNU	L 19–27	16,011
October 5	1:00 pm	North Carolina Central	William H. Greene Stadium; Washington, DC		L 28–37	5,101
October 12	1:00 pm	No. 16 Bethune-Cookman	William H. Greene Stadium; Washington, DC		L 6–27	1,052
October 19	2:00 pm	at Florida A&M	Bragg Memorial Stadium; Tallahassee, FL		W 21–10	15,342
October 26	1:00 pm	Morgan State^{†}	William H. Greene Stadium; Washington, DC (rivalry)		W 28–14	7,053
November 2	2:00 pm	at Delaware State	Alumni Stadium; Dover, DE		L 20–22	2,039
November 9	1:00 pm	Savannah State	William H. Greene Stadium; Washington, DC		W 42–14	3,053
November 16	3:00 pm	at Texas Southern*	BBVA Compass Stadium; Houston, TX	CSNH (tape delay)	W 40–6	1,562
November 23	1:00 pm	at Hampton	Armstrong Stadium; Hampton, VA (The Real HU)		W 42–39	3,355
*Non-conference game; ^{†}Homecoming; Rankings from The Sports Network Poll released prior to the game; All times are in Eastern time
