= 2013 Arkansas–Pine Bluff Golden Lions football team =

American college football season

2013 Arkansas–Pine Bluff Golden Lions football
- Conference: Southwestern Athletic Conference
- West Division
- Record: 2–9 (2–7 SWAC)
- Head coach: Monte Coleman (6th season)
- Offensive coordinator: Eric Dooley (2nd season)
- Defensive coordinator: Monte Coleman (8th season)
- Home stadium: Golden Lion Stadium

2013 Southwestern Athletic Conference football standings
	Conf.			Overall
Team	W		L	W		L
East Division
Jackson State xy	8	–	1	8	–	4
Alcorn State	7	–	2	9	–	3
Alabama State *	7	–	2	8	–	4
Alabama A&M	4	–	5	4	–	8
Mississippi Valley State *	2	–	7	2	–	9
West Division
Southern xy$	7	–	2	9	–	4
Prairie View A&M	5	–	4	6	–	6
Arkansas–Pine Bluff	2	–	7	2	–	9
Texas Southern *	2	–	7	2	–	9
Grambling State	1	–	8	1	–	11
Championship: Southern 34, Jackson State 27 ^{2OT}
$ – Conference champion; x – Division champion/co-champions; y – Championship game participant; * – ineligible for postseason

The 2013 Arkansas–Pine Bluff Golden Lions football team represented the University of Arkansas at Pine Bluff in the 2013 NCAA Division I FCS football season. The Golden Lions were led by sixth year head coach Monte Coleman and played their home games at Golden Lion Stadium as a member of the West Division of the Southwestern Athletic Conference (SWAC). They came into the 2013 season as the defending SWAC Champions.

== Media ==
All the Golden Lions football games were broadcast on KUAP 89.7 FM. Select games were also aired on various ESPN Networks and Comcast.

== Schedule ==
Date	Time	Opponent	Site	TV	Result	Attendance
August 31	6:00 pm	at Arkansas State*	Liberty Bank Stadium; Jonesboro, AR	ESPN3	L 11–62	30,451
September 7	7:30 pm	at No. 18 McNeese State*	Cowboy Stadium; Lake Charles, LA	CSNH	L 14–58	15,217
September 14	6:00 pm	Alabama State	Golden Lion Stadium; Pine Bluff, AR	ESPN3; ESPNU^	L 39–40	6,213
September 21	6:00 pm	Alcorn State	Golden Lion Stadium; Pine Bluff, AR		L 16–21	5,714
October 5	6:00 pm	at Jackson State	Mississippi Veterans Memorial Stadium; Jackson, MS		L 33–42	9,087
October 12	6:00 pm	Texas Southern	Golden Lion Stadium; Pine Bluff, AR		L 28–41	4,491
October 19	2:30 pm	Southern^{†}	Golden Lion Stadium; Pine Bluff, AR		L 21–29	11,059
October 26	1:00 pm	at Mississippi Valley State	Rice–Totten Field; Itta Bena, MS		W 38–18	8,632
November 9	2:30 pm	Grambling State	Golden Lion Stadium; Pine Bluff, AR		W 45–42	5,787
November 16	1:00 pm	at Alabama A&M	Louis Crews Stadium; Huntsville, AL		L 42–50	7,783
November 23	2:30 pm	Prairie View A&M	Edward L. Blackshear Field; Prairie View, TX		L 23-43	1,658;
*Non-conference game; ^{†}Homecoming; Rankings from The Sports Network Poll released prior to the game; All times are in Central time

^Game aired on a tape delayed basis
