= 2013 Alabama State Hornets football team =

American college football season

2013 Alabama State Hornets football
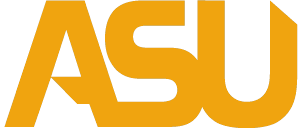
- Conference: Southwestern Athletic Conference
- East Division
- Record: 8–4 (7–2 SWAC)
- Head coach: Reggie Barlow (7th season)
- Offensive coordinator: Fred Kaiss (3rd season)
- Defensive coordinator: Kevin Ramsey (1st season)
- Home stadium: New ASU Stadium

2013 Southwestern Athletic Conference football standings
| | Conf. | | | Overall |
| Team | W | | L | W | | L |
|---|---|---|---|---|---|---|
East Division
| Jackson State xy | 8 | – | 1 | 8 | – | 4 |
| Alcorn State | 7 | – | 2 | 9 | – | 3 |
| Alabama State * | 7 | – | 2 | 8 | – | 4 |
| Alabama A&M | 4 | – | 5 | 4 | – | 8 |
| Mississippi Valley State * | 2 | – | 7 | 2 | – | 9 |
West Division
| Southern xy$ | 7 | – | 2 | 9 | – | 4 |
| Prairie View A&M | 5 | – | 4 | 6 | – | 6 |
| Arkansas–Pine Bluff | 2 | – | 7 | 2 | – | 9 |
| Texas Southern * | 2 | – | 7 | 2 | – | 9 |
| Grambling State | 1 | – | 8 | 1 | – | 11 |
Championship: Southern 34, Jackson State 27 ^{2OT}
$ – Conference champion; x – Division champion/co-champions; y – Championship game participant; * – ineligible for postseason

The 2013 Alabama State Hornets football team represented Alabama State University as a member of the East Division of the Southwestern Athletic Conference (SWAC) during 2013 NCAA Division I FCS football season. Led by seventh-year head coach Reggie Barlow, the Hornets compiled an overall record of 8–4 with a mark of 7–2 in conference play, tying for second place in the SWAC East Division. Alabama State played home games at New ASU Stadium in Montgomery, Alabama.

Alabama State entered the season with a new defensive coordinator, Kevin Ramsey, who joined the team from Texas Southern University. The Hornets were picked to win the SWAC Eastern Division, and seven players were selected for the SWAC Pre-Season All-Conference team.

== Schedule ==
| Date | Time | Opponent | Site | TV | Result | Attendance |
|---|---|---|---|---|---|---|
| August 31 | 5:00 pm | Jacksonville State* | New ASU Stadium; Montgomery, AL | | L 22–24 | 20,703 |
| September 7 | 6:00 pm | at Jackson State | Mississippi Veterans Memorial Stadium; Jackson, MS (W. C. Gordon Classic) | ESPN3, ESPNU^ | L 23–30 | 22,003 |
| September 14 | 6:00 pm | at Arkansas–Pine Bluff | Golden Lions Stadium; Pine Bluff, AR | | W 40–39 | 6,213 |
| September 21 | 5:00 pm | Grambling State | New ASU Stadium; Montgomery, AL | | W 52–21 | 11,751 |
| September 28 | 5:00 pm | Alcorn State | New ASU Stadium; Montgomery, AL | | W 49–30 | 12,503 |
| October 5 | 6:00 pm | at Texas Southern | BBVA Compass Stadium; Houston, TX | CSNH^ | W 34–2 | 2,186 |
| October 12 | 1:00 pm | Prairie View A&M | New ASU Stadium; Montgomery, AL | | W 48–42 ^{OT} | 1,123 |
| October 26 | 2:30 pm | vs. Alabama A&M | Legion Field; Birmingham, AL (Magic City Classic) | ESPN3, ESPNU^ | W 31–7 | 63,113 |
| November 2 | 6:30 pm | at Kentucky* | Commonwealth Stadium; Lexington, KY | ESPN3 | L 14–48 | 53,797 |
| November 9 | 1:00 pm | Southern | New ASU Stadium; Montgomery, AL | | L 28–31 | 15,143 |
| November 16 | 1:00 pm | at Mississippi Valley State | Rice–Totten Field; Itta Bena, MS | | W 19–7 | 1,873 |
| November 28 | 3:00 pm | Stillman* | New ASU Stadium; Montgomery, AL (Turkey Day Classic) | ESPNU | W 41–28 | 14,396 |
*Non-conference game; All times are in Central time

^Games aired on a tape delayed basis
