= 2013 Jackson State Tigers football team =

American college football season

2013 Jackson State Tigers football

SWAC East Division champion

SWAC Championship Game, L 27–34 vs. Southern
- Conference: Southwestern Athletic Conference
- East Division
- Record: 8–4 (8–1 SWAC)
- Head coach: Rick Comegy (8th season)
- Offensive coordinator: Derrick McCall (2nd season)
- Defensive coordinator: Darrin Hayes (8th season)
- Home stadium: Mississippi Veterans Memorial Stadium

2013 Southwestern Athletic Conference football standings
| | Conf. | | | Overall |
| Team | W | | L | W | | L |
|---|---|---|---|---|---|---|
East Division
| Jackson State xy | 8 | – | 1 | 8 | – | 4 |
| Alcorn State | 7 | – | 2 | 9 | – | 3 |
| Alabama State * | 7 | – | 2 | 8 | – | 4 |
| Alabama A&M | 4 | – | 5 | 4 | – | 8 |
| Mississippi Valley State * | 2 | – | 7 | 2 | – | 9 |
West Division
| Southern xy$ | 7 | – | 2 | 9 | – | 4 |
| Prairie View A&M | 5 | – | 4 | 6 | – | 6 |
| Arkansas–Pine Bluff | 2 | – | 7 | 2 | – | 9 |
| Texas Southern * | 2 | – | 7 | 2 | – | 9 |
| Grambling State | 1 | – | 8 | 1 | – | 11 |
Championship: Southern 34, Jackson State 27 ^{2OT}
$ – Conference champion; x – Division champion/co-champions; y – Championship game participant; * – ineligible for postseason

The 2013 Jackson State Tigers football team represented Jackson State University in the 2013 NCAA Division I FCS football season. The Tigers were led by eighth year head coach Rick Comegy and played their home games at Mississippi Veterans Memorial Stadium. They were a member of the SWAC East Division. Jackson State returned as the defending East Division Champs. The Tigers finished the season with an 8–4 record, as East Division Champions and with a loss against Southern in the SWAC Championship Game.

On Media Day, Jackson State was picked to finish second in the Eastern Division of the SWAC. They had two players, Defensive Lineman Tedderick Terrell and Defensive Back Qua Cox selected the Pre-Season All-SWAC 1st Team Defense. Running backs Tommy Gooden and Rakeem Sims, offensive lineman Jordan Arthur, linebacker Todd Wilcher, and defensive back Cameron Loeffler were selected as All-SWAC 2nd Team members.

== Schedule ==
| Date | Time | Opponent | Site | TV | Result | Attendance |
|---|---|---|---|---|---|---|
| August 29 | 7:00 pm | at Tulane* | Mercedes-Benz Superdome; New Orleans, LA | | L 7–34 | 20,992 |
| September 7 | 5:00 pm | Alabama State | Mississippi Veterans Memorial Stadium; Jackson, MS (W.C. Gordon Classic) | ESPNU^ | W 30–23 | 29,003 |
| September 14 | 6:00 pm | vs. Tennessee State* | Liberty Bowl Memorial Stadium; Memphis, TN (Southern Heritage Classic) | FSSO | L 16–26 | 42,400 |
| September 19 | 6:30 pm | Texas Southern | Mississippi Veterans Memorial Stadium; Jackson, MS | ESPNU | W 35–7 | 18,801 |
| September 28 | 6:00 pm | at Southern | Ace W. Mumford Stadium; Baton Rouge, LA (Boombox Classic) | CST^ | W 19–14 | 30,816 |
| October 5 | 6:00 pm | Arkansas–Pine Bluff | Mississippi Veterans Memorial Stadium; Jackson, MS | | W 42–33 | 14,087 |
| October 12 | 2:00 pm | at Mississippi Valley State | Rice–Totten Field; Itta Bena, MS | | W 26–17 | 10,042 |
| October 19 | 2:00 pm | Grambling State^{†} | Mississippi Veterans Memorial Stadium; Jackson, MS | | W Forfeit ^{A} | 27,288 |
| October 26 | 4:00 pm | vs. Prairie View A&M^{†} | Independence Stadium; Shreveport, LA (Shreveport Classic) | | W 51–38 | 5,116 |
| November 9 | 1:00 pm | at Alabama A&M | Louis Crews Stadium; Huntsville, AL | | W 26–20 | 7,365 |
| November 16 | 2:00 pm | Alcorn State | Mississippi Veterans Memorial Stadium; Jackson, MS (Soul Bowl) | | L 33–48 | 34,252 |
| December 7 | 1:00 pm | vs. Southern | Reliant Stadium; Houston, TX (SWAC Championship Game) | | L 27–34 ^{2OT} | 38,985 |
*Non-conference game; ^{†}Homecoming; All times are in Central time

^Games aired on a tape delayed basis

- ^A The October 19 game against Grambling State was forfeited due to Grambling State players refusing to travel to Jackson State. Jackson State subsequently announced their intention to sue Grambling due to the school suffering financial losses.

== Media ==
Jackson State games were broadcast on 95.5 Hallelujah FM. All Jackson State games were also streamed online at no cost via Yahoo!.
