= 2013 North Carolina Tar Heels football team =

American college football season

2013 North Carolina Tar Heels football

Belk Bowl champion

Belk Bowl, W 39–17 vs. Cincinnati
- Conference: Atlantic Coast Conference
- Coastal Division
- Record: 7–6 (4–4 ACC)
- Head coach: Larry Fedora (2nd season)
- Offensive coordinator: Blake Anderson (2nd season)
- Offensive scheme: Spread
- Defensive coordinator: Dan Disch (2nd season)
- Base defense: 4–2–5
- Captains: A. J. Blue; Mack Hollins; James Hurst; Kareem Martin; Jabari Price
- Home stadium: Kenan Memorial Stadium

Uniform
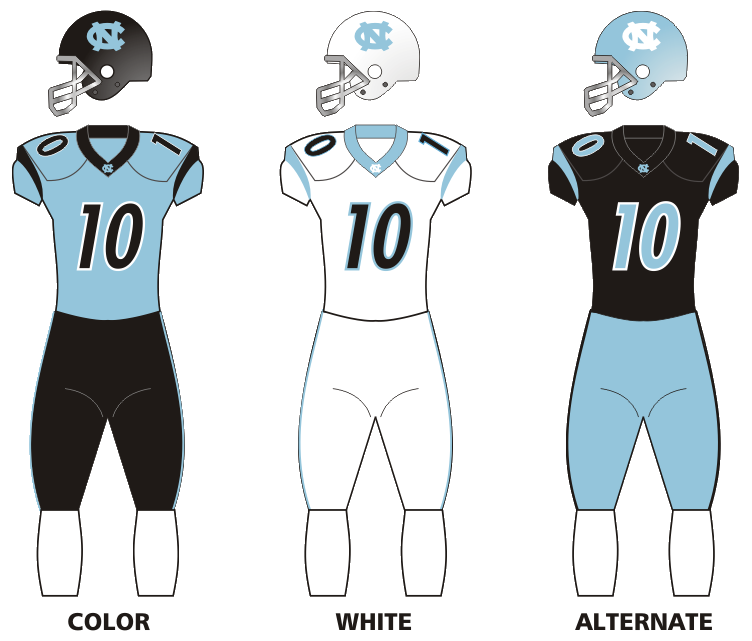

2013 Atlantic Coast Conference football standings
	Conf.			Overall
Team	W		L	W		L
Atlantic Division
No. 1 Florida State x$#	8	–	0	14	–	0
No. 8 Clemson %	7	–	1	11	–	2
Boston College	4	–	4	7	–	6
Syracuse	4	–	4	7	–	6
Maryland	3	–	5	7	–	6
Wake Forest	2	–	6	4	–	8
NC State	0	–	8	3	–	9
Coastal Division
No. 23 Duke x	6	–	2	10	–	4
Miami (FL)	5	–	3	9	–	4
Virginia Tech	5	–	3	8	–	5
Georgia Tech	5	–	3	7	–	6
North Carolina	4	–	4	7	–	6
Pittsburgh	3	–	5	7	–	6
Virginia	0	–	8	2	–	10
Championship: Florida State 45, Duke 7
# – BCS National Champion; $ – BCS representative as conference champion; % – BCS at-large representative; x – Division champion/co-champions; Rankings from AP Poll

The 2013 North Carolina Tar Heels football team represented the University of North Carolina at Chapel Hill as a member of Coastal Division of the Atlantic Coast Conference (ACC) during the 2013 NCAA Division I FBS football season. The team was led by second-year head coach Larry Fedora and played their home games at Kenan Memorial Stadium. The Tar Heels finished the season 7–6 overall and 4–4 in ACC play to place fifth in the Coastal Division. They were invited to the Belk Bowl, where they defeated Cincinnati.

== Schedule ==
Date	Time	Opponent	Site	TV	Result	Attendance	Source
August 29	6:00 p.m.	at No. 6 South Carolina*	Williams–Brice Stadium; Columbia, SC (rivalry)	ESPN	L 10–27	81,572	
September 7	12:30 p.m.	Middle Tennessee*	Kenan Memorial Stadium; Chapel Hill, NC	ACCN	W 40–20	48,000	
September 21	12:00 p.m.	at Georgia Tech	Bobby Dodd Stadium; Atlanta, GA	ESPN	L 20–28	49,445	
September 28	12:30 p.m.	East Carolina*	Kenan Memorial Stadium; Chapel Hill, NC	ACCN	L 31–55	60,000	
October 5	12:30 p.m.	at Virginia Tech	Lane Stadium; Blacksburg, VA	ACCN	L 17–27	65,632	
October 17	7:30 p.m.	No. 10 Miami (FL)	Kenan Memorial Stadium; Chapel Hill, NC	ESPN	L 23–27	56,000	
October 26	3:30 p.m.	Boston College	Kenan Memorial Stadium; Chapel Hill, NC	ACCRSN	W 34–10	43,000	
November 2	12:30 p.m.	at NC State	Carter–Finley Stadium; Raleigh, NC (rivalry)	ACCN	W 27–19	57,583	
November 9	12:30 p.m.	Virginia	Kenan Memorial Stadium; Chapel Hill, NC (South's Oldest Rivalry)	ACCN	W 45–14	50,000	
November 16	12:30 p.m.	at Pittsburgh	Heinz Field; Pittsburgh, PA	ACCN	W 34–27	50,049	
November 23	12:00 p.m.	Old Dominion*	Kenan Memorial Stadium; Chapel Hill, NC	ACCRSN	W 80–20	41,500	
November 30	12:00 p.m.	No. 24 Duke	Kenan Memorial Stadium; Chapel Hill, NC (Victory Bell)	ESPN2	L 25–27	62,000	
December 28	3:20 p.m.	vs. Cincinnati*	Bank of America Stadium; Charlotte, NC (Belk Bowl)	ESPN	W 39–17	45,211	
*Non-conference game; Rankings from AP Poll released prior to the game; All times are in Eastern time

== Before the season ==
=== Previous season ===
In his first year as head coach in a season that the UNC football team was ineligible for the ACC title, a bowl game and a ranking in the USA Today Coaches' Poll, Larry Fedora led the team to an 8–4 record. The offense finished the season ranked 14th out of 120 teams in terms of total yards per game. The defense finished the season ranked 56th out of 120 teams in terms of opponent total yards per game. North Carolina had at least eight victories in four of the five years from 2008 to 2012. The eight wins in 2008 and 2009 were vacated due to NCAA penalty. The last time North Carolina had more than eight victories was in 1997.

=== Spring practice ===
Marquise Williams, Bryn Renner's backup quarterback in the 2012 season, was not enrolled in classes at UNC in the spring semester. UNC coach Larry Fedora said Williams may re-enroll at UNC during the summer. After the spring football game in April 2013, Fedora said that if the season started, early enrollee freshman quarterback Mitch Trubisky would be the second-string quarterback.

=== Recruiting ===
Prior to National Signing Day, four high school players that graduated early and received scholarship offers to play football at North Carolina enrolled for the spring semester, allowing them to participate in spring practice. These included: quarterback Mitch Trubisky, wide receiver Jordan Fieulleteau, running back Kris Francis, and offensive tackle R. J. Prince. On February 6, 2013 thirteen additional players signed their National Letter of Intent to play at North Carolina that completed the 2013 recruiting class. Based on the March 2012 sanctions from the NCAA, North Carolina could only sign a maximum of 20 players per year for the next two years versus the regular limit of 25.

North Carolina's recruiting class was highlighted by five players from the "ESPN 300": No. 118 Brian Walker (CB); No. 159 Greg Webb (DT); No. 194 Johnathan Howard (WR); No. 219 Mitch Trubisky (QB); No. 275 Jordan Fieulleteau (WR). The Tar Heels signed the No. 42 recruiting class according to Rivals.com and the No. 29 recruiting class according to Scout.com. ESPN had North Carolina's class as the No. 21 recruiting class in the nation.

College recruiting information (2013)
Name	Hometown	School	Height	Weight	40^{‡}	Commit date
Brian Walker; CB	Charlotte, NC	Mallard Creek HS	5 ft 10 in (1.78 m)	172 lb (78 kg)	4.49	Mar 20, 2012
Brian Walker; CB	Recruit ratings: Scout: Rivals: (84)					
Greg Webb; DT	Erial, NJ	Timber Creek Regional HS	6 ft 2 in (1.88 m)	298 lb (135 kg)	5.20	Jul 21, 2012
Greg Webb; DT	Recruit ratings: Scout: Rivals: (83)					
Johnathan Howard; WR	Rochelle, GA	Wilcox County HS	6 ft 4 in (1.93 m)	184 lb (83 kg)	4.65	Sep 23, 2012
Johnathan Howard; WR	Recruit ratings: Scout: Rivals: (83)					
Mitch Trubisky; QB	Mentor, OH	Mentor HS	6 ft 3 in (1.91 m)	193 lb (88 kg)	4.70	May 20, 2012
Mitch Trubisky; QB	Recruit ratings: Scout: Rivals: (83)					
Jordan Fieulleteau; WR	Raleigh, NC	Wakefield HS	6 ft 3 in (1.91 m)	200 lb (91 kg)	5.07	Feb 13, 2012
Jordan Fieulleteau; WR	Recruit ratings: Scout: Rivals: (82)					
Khris Francis; RB	Durham, NC	Hillside HS	5 ft 9 in (1.75 m)	185 lb (84 kg)	4.59	Feb 8, 2012
Khris Francis; RB	Recruit ratings: Scout: Rivals: (81)					
Lucas Crowley; OC	Saint Augustine, FL	Nease HS	6 ft 3 in (1.91 m)	270 lb (120 kg)	5.30	Jul 28, 2012
Lucas Crowley; OC	Recruit ratings: Scout: Rivals: (81)					
T. J. Logan; ATH	Greensboro, NC	Northern Guilford HS	5 ft 10 in (1.78 m)	175 lb (79 kg)	4.50	Jul 10, 2012
T. J. Logan; ATH	Recruit ratings: Scout: Rivals: (80)					
R.J. Prince; OT	Albemarle, NC	Albemarle HS	6 ft 7 in (2.01 m)	300 lb (140 kg)	5.05	Feb 19, 2012
R.J. Prince; OT	Recruit ratings: Scout: Rivals: (80)					
Nazair Jones; DE	Roanoke Rapids, NC	Roanoke Rapids HS	6 ft 5 in (1.96 m)	247 lb (112 kg)	4.75	Jul 20, 2012
Nazair Jones; DE	Recruit ratings: Scout: Rivals: (80)					
Ryan Switzer; WR	Charleston, WV	George Washington HS	5 ft 9 in (1.75 m)	168 lb (76 kg)	4.52	Mar 28, 2012
Ryan Switzer; WR	Recruit ratings: Scout: Rivals: (80)					
Marquis Haynes; DE	Jacksonville, FL	University Christian HS	6 ft 3 in (1.91 m)	223 lb (101 kg)	4.65	Aug 5, 2012
Marquis Haynes; DE	Recruit ratings: Scout: Rivals: (79)					
Dajaun Drennon; DE	Erial, NJ	Timber Creek HS	6 ft 3 in (1.91 m)	228 lb (103 kg)	4.70	Jul 21, 2012
Dajaun Drennon; DE	Recruit ratings: Scout: Rivals: (78)					
Donnie Miles; ATH	Suwanee, GA	North Gwinnett HS	5 ft 11 in (1.80 m)	198 lb (90 kg)	4.50	Mar 18, 2012
Donnie Miles; ATH	Recruit ratings: Scout: Rivals: (76)					
Desmond Lawrence; S	Charlotte, NC	Charlotte Christian School	6 ft 0 in (1.83 m)	173 lb (78 kg)	4.60	Apr 7, 2012
Desmond Lawrence; S	Recruit ratings: Scout: Rivals: (76)					
Brad Henson Jr. OG	Surf City, NJ	Monsignor Donovan HS	6 ft 5 in (1.96 m)	295 lb (134 kg)	5.2	Dec 16, 2012
Brad Henson Jr. OG	Recruit ratings: Scout: Rivals: (75)					
Mikey Bart; TE	Buford, GA	Buford HS	6 ft 3 in (1.91 m)	245 lb (111 kg)	4.75	Jan 11, 2013
Mikey Bart; TE	Recruit ratings: Scout: Rivals: (74)					
Overall recruit ranking: Scout: 41 Rivals: 40
‡ Refers to 40-yard dash; Note: In many cases, Scout, Rivals, 247Sports, On3, and ESPN may conflict in their listings of height, weight and 40 time.; In these cases, the average was taken. ESPN grades are on a 100-point scale.; Sources: "North Carolina Commit List for 2013". Rivals.; "Scout.com Football Recruiting: North Carolina". Scout.; "RecruitTracker 2013: North Carolina". ESPN.; "Scout.com Team Recruiting Rankings". Scout.; "2013 Team Ranking". Rivals.com.

== Personnel ==
=== Coaching staff ===
North Carolina head coach Larry Fedora entered his second year as the North Carolina's head coach for the 2013 season. After his first year of coaching, Fedora led the Tar Heels to an eight wins and four losses, but post season ineligibility ended their season after their final regular season game. Defensive line coach Deke Adams left the Tar Heels to coach the same position at South Carolina. On February 5, 2013, Illinois defensive line coach Keith Gilmore was hired to replace Deke Adams. David Duggan the outside linebackers coach and special teams coordinator left North Carolina for Southern Mississippi after one season of coaching. Larry Fedora then hired Arizona State coach Ron West to become the new co-defensive coordinator and linebackers coach.

Coaches for the 2013 season
Name	Position	Seasons at North Carolina
Larry Fedora	Head coach	2nd
Blake Anderson	Offensive coordinator/quarterbacks	2nd
Walt Bell	Tight Ends	2nd
Gunter Brewer	Passing game coordinator/wide receivers	2nd (7th overall)
Dan Disch	Defensive coordinator/secondary	2nd
Keith Gilmore	Defensive Line	1st
Lou Hernandez	Strength and conditioning coordinator	2nd
Randy Jordan	Running backs coach	2nd
Chris Kapilovic	Run game coordinator/offensive line	2nd
Vic Koenning	Associate head coach for defense/inside linebackers	2nd
Ron West	Co-defensive coordinator/linebackers	1st

=== Returning starters ===
Offense
Player	Class	Position
Russell Bodine	Junior	Center
James Hurst	Senior	Left Tackle
Bryn Renner	Senior	Quarterback
Landon Turner	Sophomore	Right Guard
A.J. Blue	Senior	Running Back
Eric Ebron	Junior	Tight End
Jack Tabb	Junior	Tight End
Quinshad Davis	Sophomore	Wide Receiver
Mark McNeill	Junior	Wide Receiver
Sean Tapley	Junior	Wide Receiver

Defense
Player	Class	Position
Jabari Price	Senior	Cornerback
Tim Scott	Junior	Cornerback
Kareem Martin	Senior	Defensive End
Tommy Heffernan	Senior	Linebacker
Travis Hughes	Junior	Linebacker
Darius Lipford	Senior	Linebacker
Tim Jackson	Senior	Nose Tackle
Shawn Underwood	Junior	Nose Tackle
Tre Boston	Senior	Safety
Darien Rankin	Sophomore	Safety
Sam Smiley	Sophomore	Safety

Special Teams
Player	Class	Position
Parker Thomas	Senior	Deep snapper
Sean Tapley	Junior	Kickoff returner
Thomas Moore	Junior	Place-kicker/Kickoff
Tommy Hibbard	Junior	Punter

=== Depth chart ===
Defense

S
S_Starter
S_Backup

FS
Tre Boston
Kameron Jackson

WLB	SLB
WLB_Starter	SLB_Starter
WLB_Backup	SLB_Backup

SS
Dominique Green
Darien Rankin

CB
Jabari Price
Alex Dixon

DE	DT	DT	DE
Kareem Martin	Tim Jackson	Ethan Farmer	Norkeithus Otis
Junior Gnonkonde	Justin Thomason	Shawn Underwood	Darius Lipford

CB
Tim Scott
T.J. Jiles

Offense

WR
Kendrick Singleton
Ryan Switzer

WR
Quinshad Davis
T.J. Thorpe

LT	LG	C	RG	RT
James Hurst	Caleb Peterson	Russell Bodine	Landon Turner	Jon Heck
John Ferranto	Will Dancy	Lucas Crowley	David Collins	Kiaro Holts

TE
Eric Ebron
Jack Tabb

WR
Sean Tapley
Mark McNeill

QB
Bryn Renner
Marquise Williams

Special teams
PK Thomas Moore
P Tommy Hibbard
KR Sean Tapley
PR T.J. Thorpe
LS Mack Lloyd

RB
Romar Morris
A.J. Blue

== NFL draft ==
Five former players were selected in the 2014 NFL draft:

Round	Pick	Overall	Player	Position	NFL Team
1st	10	10	Eric Ebron	Tight end	Detroit Lions
3rd	20	84	Kareem Martin	Defensive end	Arizona Cardinals
4th	11	111	Russell Bodine	Center	Cincinnati Bengals
4th	28	128	Tre Boston	Safety	Carolina Panthers
7th	10	225	Jabari Price	Cornerback	Minnesota Vikings
