= 2013 Georgia Tech Yellow Jackets football team =

American college football season

2013 Georgia Tech Yellow Jackets football

Music City Bowl vs. Ole Miss, L 17–25
- Conference: Atlantic Coast Conference
- Coastal Division
- Record: 7–6 (5–3 ACC)
- Head coach: Paul Johnson (6th season)
- Offensive scheme: Flexbone triple option
- Defensive coordinator: Ted Roof (4th season)
- Base defense: Multiple 4–3
- Home stadium: Bobby Dodd Stadium

2013 Atlantic Coast Conference football standings
	Conf.			Overall
Team	W		L	W		L
Atlantic Division
No. 1 Florida State x$#	8	–	0	14	–	0
No. 8 Clemson %	7	–	1	11	–	2
Boston College	4	–	4	7	–	6
Syracuse	4	–	4	7	–	6
Maryland	3	–	5	7	–	6
Wake Forest	2	–	6	4	–	8
NC State	0	–	8	3	–	9
Coastal Division
No. 23 Duke x	6	–	2	10	–	4
Miami (FL)	5	–	3	9	–	4
Virginia Tech	5	–	3	8	–	5
Georgia Tech	5	–	3	7	–	6
North Carolina	4	–	4	7	–	6
Pittsburgh	3	–	5	7	–	6
Virginia	0	–	8	2	–	10
Championship: Florida State 45, Duke 7
# – BCS National Champion; $ – BCS representative as conference champion; % – BCS at-large representative; x – Division champion/co-champions; Rankings from AP Poll

The 2013 Georgia Tech Yellow Jackets football team represented the Georgia Institute of Technology in the 2013 NCAA Division I FBS football season. The Yellow Jackets were led by sixth year head coach Paul Johnson and played their home games at Bobby Dodd Stadium. They were members of the Coastal Division of the Atlantic Coast Conference. They finished the season 7–6, 5–3 in ACC play to finish in a three way tie for second place in the Coastal Division. They were invited to the Music City Bowl where they lost to Ole Miss.

== Coaching staff ==
Name	Position	Seasons at Georgia Tech	Alma mater
Paul Johnson	Head Coach	5	Western Carolina (1979)
Bryan Cook	Quarterbacks/B-Backs	0	Ithaca (1998)
Lamar S. Owens Jr.	A-Backs	5	Maryland (2008)
Al Preston	Wide Receivers	5	Hawaii (1982)
Mike Sewak	Offensive Line	5	Virginia (1981)
Ted Roof	Defensive Coordinator	0	Georgia Tech (1986)
Andy McCollum	Linebackers/Recruiting Coordinator	3	Austin Peay State (1981)
Mike Pelton	Defensive Line	0	Auburn (1999)
Joe Speed	Defensive Backs	3	Navy (1996)
Ray Rylcheski	Special Teams Coordinator	1	Valley Forge (1981)

== Previous season ==
They were members of the Coastal Division of the Atlantic Coast Conference, finishing the season 7–7, 5–3 in ACC play to share the Coastal Division Championship with Miami and North Carolina. With Miami and North Carolina on post seasons bans, Georgia Tech represented the division in the ACC Championship Game where they were defeated by Florida State. They were invited to the Sun Bowl where they defeated USC.

== Schedule ==
Date	Time	Opponent	Site	TV	Result	Attendance
August 31	12:00 pm	Elon*	Bobby Dodd Stadium; Atlanta, GA	ESPN3	W 70–0	45,759
September 14	3:30 pm	at Duke	Wallace Wade Stadium; Durham, NC	ESPNU	W 38–14	21,267
September 21	12:00 pm	North Carolina	Bobby Dodd Stadium; Atlanta, GA	ESPN	W 28–20	49,445
September 26	7:30 pm	Virginia Tech	Bobby Dodd Stadium; Atlanta, GA (Battle of the Techs)	ESPN	L 10–17	50,214
October 5	3:30 pm	at No. 14 Miami (FL)	Sun Life Stadium; Miami Gardens, FL	ESPNU	L 30–45	47,008
October 12	7:00 pm	at BYU*	LaVell Edwards Stadium; Provo, UT	ESPNU	L 20–38	60,320
October 19	12:30 pm	Syracuse	Bobby Dodd Stadium; Atlanta, GA	ACCN	W 56–0	45,704
October 26	12:30 pm	at Virginia	Scott Stadium; Charlottesville, VA	ACCN	W 35–25	41,930
November 2	7:00 pm	Pittsburgh^{†}	Bobby Dodd Stadium; Atlanta, GA	ESPNU	W 21–10	52,312
November 14	7:30 pm	at No. 8 Clemson	Memorial Stadium; Clemson, SC (rivalry)	ESPN	L 31–55	75,324
November 23	1:30 pm	Alabama A&M*	Bobby Dodd Stadium; Atlanta, GA	ESPN3	W 66–7	45,194
November 30	3:30 pm	Georgia*	Bobby Dodd Stadium; Atlanta, GA (Clean, Old-Fashioned Hate)	ABC	L 34–41 ^{2OT}	54,914
December 30	3:15 pm	vs. Ole Miss*	LP Field; Nashville, TN (Music City Bowl)	ESPN	L 17–25	52,125
*Non-conference game; ^{†}Homecoming; Rankings from Coaches' Poll released prior to the game; All times are in Eastern time

- Schedule source:

== Game summaries ==
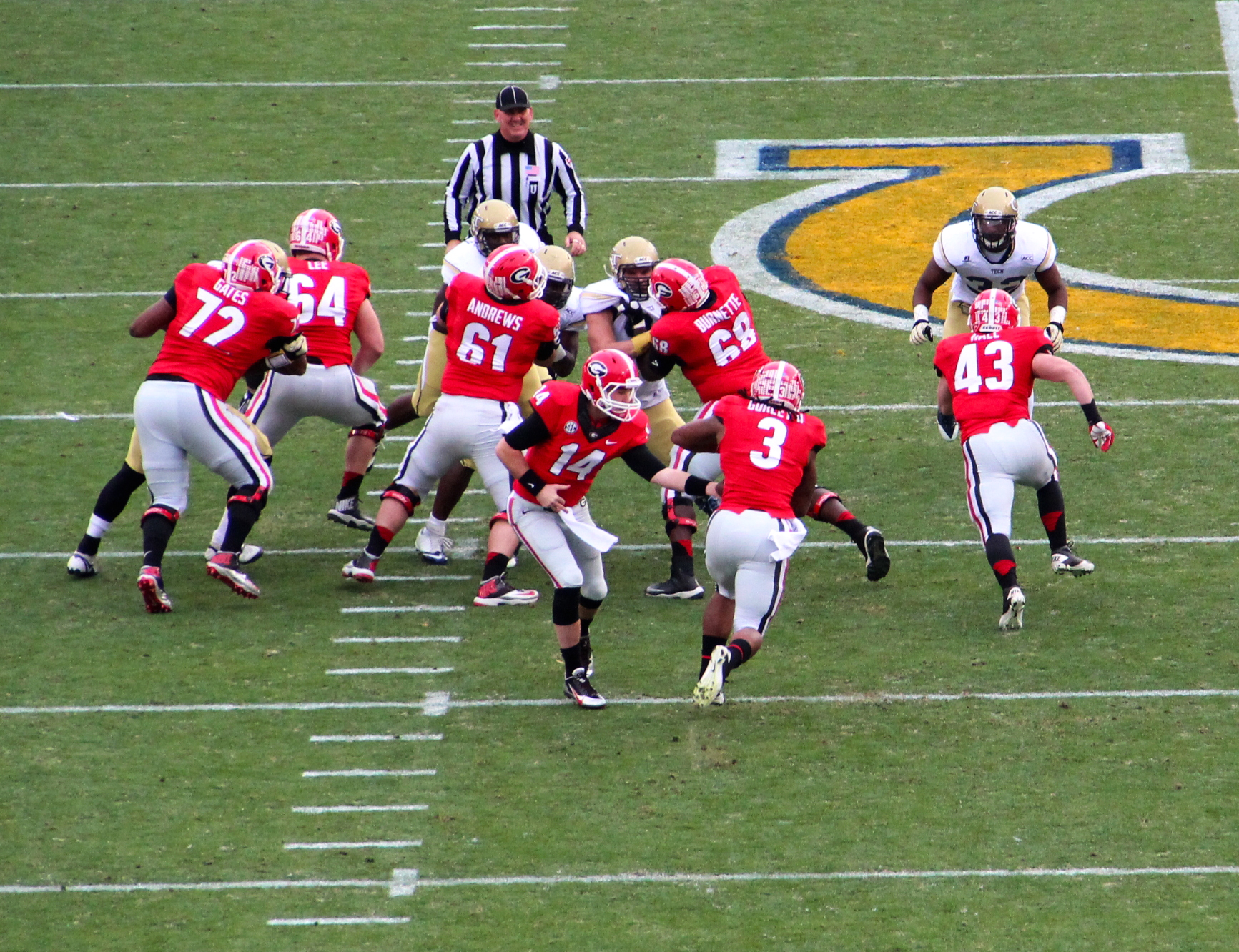
Georgia vs Georgia Tech, November 30, 2013

=== Georgia Tech vs. Elon ===
Georgia Tech opened their 2013 season with a rout of Elon University, one of the two FCS teams the Yellow Jackets will play this season. In Ted Roof's first game as Defensive Coordinator, Georgia Tech would force four turnovers including two interceptions returned for touchdowns. Vad Lee showed off his passing abilities by throwing for two touchdowns to David Sims and Robert Godhigh for 59 and 24 yards respectively. Six different Yellow Jackets accounted for six rushing touchdowns including a 44-yard run by backup red-shirt freshman quarterback Justin Thomas in the fourth quarter. Elon's only major scoring opportunity was a missed field goal as time expired at the end of the first half.

=== Georgia Tech vs. Duke ===
Georgia Tech opened up their 2013 ACC schedule at the Duke Blue Devils on September 14. Georgia Tech scored first on a 49-yard field goal from true freshman kicker Harrison Butker, his first field goal of the year after kicking a plethora PATs against Elon. Duke answered back with a touchdown of their own off a Jela Duncan 1 yard run to go up 7–3 seven minutes into the contest. Georgia Tech would then rattle off 28 unanswered points to go up 31–7 by the end of the third quarter. In the fourth quarter each team would trade touchdowns for a final score of 38–14. Vad Lee threw four touchdowns and one interception seen as a stellar passing performance from a Georgia Tech quarterback due to the emphasis on the triple option on offense. To go along with the passing game Georgia Tech averaged 5.7 yards per run weakening the Duke defense instrumentally. With the win Georgia Tech went to 2–0 for the season and 1–0 in conference play.

=== Georgia Tech vs. North Carolina ===
Georgia Tech's first ACC home game was against the North Carolina Tar Heels. The game was played in a steady rain allowing the experience of North Carolina senior quarterback Bryn Renner to control the game while Georgia Tech's relative inexperience led to several fumbles and drops ending drives without a score. The Tar Heels scored two touchdowns in the first quarter but failed to convert a two-point conversion on the first while settling for a PAT on the second to lead 13–0. David Sims ran for a 1-yard touchdown to get the Yellow Jackets on the board, but Bryn Renner connected with Sean Tapley for a 24-yard TD less than two minutes later to put the Tar Heels back up thirteen. The turning point of the game was a 21-yard touchdown pass from Vad Lee to Darren Waller with 30 seconds remaining in the half to dent the deficit back to six and allowing Georgia Tech to head to the locker room with the momentum. A squall line came over Bobby Dodd Stadium at the start of the third quarter causing sloppy play from UNC which along with Tech's improved defense prevented the Tar Heels from scoring in the second half. Paul Johnson from there on out decided to dominate the time of possession wearing down UNC's defense allowing for the Yellow Jackets to add two more rushing touchdowns for a come from behind 28–20 victory, bringing Georgia Tech to 3–0 for the season and 2–0 in conference play.

=== Georgia Tech vs. Virginia Tech ===
Georgia Tech's first night game of the year occurred on a Thursday night ESPN telecast against Virginia Tech. After an overtime victory in this matchup last year by Virginia Tech this game was expected to be a close contest. Once again Georgia Tech allowed the opposition to score early going behind 14–0 after spectacular play by Virginia Tech's quarterback Logan Thomas who threw and ran for a touchdown in the first half. Harrison Butker was able to lower the deficit to 11 after converting a 49-yard field goal. Vad Lee struggled throughout the first half throwing an interception and fumbling on another drive. Both defenses came out of halftime strong with a defensive contest dominating the third quarter until Georgia Tech miraculously recovering their own fumble on the Virginia Tech five yard line and then drawing a pass interference penalty to get a new set of downs on the two yard line. David Sims then ran in a one-yard touchdown a play later to bring the Yellow Jackets within 4. Hokie kicker Cody Journell then added a field goal to put Virginia Tech back up by a touchdown. Virginia Tech then forced a turnover on downs but could not get a first down forcing Journell to come back out on short rest. Journell would miss the field goal left. Both teams then traded three and outs. After driving for about 25 yards Kendall Fuller intercepted a Vad Lee pass deep down field on 4th and 13 giving the Hokies the ball with 1:06 remaining. Two kneels ended the game handing the Yellow Jackets their first loss of the season dropping them to 2–1 in ACC play and 3–1 for the season.

=== Georgia Tech vs. Miami ===
Looking to bounce back from their first loss of the season Georgia Tech took on undefeated Miami at Sun Life Stadium. Both offenses started strong with matching touchdowns in the first 7 minutes of the game. Georgia Tech then took over and scored 10 straight points due to a powerful run game and a turnover courtesy of a Duke Johnson fumble. However a Vad Lee fumble inside the red zone early in the second quarter would be the Yellow Jackets undoing. Injured Miami quarterback Stephen Morris along with a strong running core would rally to score 17 in a row to go up 24–17 by end of the third quarter. Georgia Tech regained composure to add a touchdown courtesy of a David Simms 6 yard run but Harrison Butker would miss the PAT after a poor snap caused him to kick into the laces keeping the Yellow Jackets behind albeit one point. A 41-yard pass from Stephen Morris to Stacy Coley set up 3-yard rushing touchdown by Dallas Crawford put Miami up by eight after a converted PAT. Rayshawn Jenkins would intercept a Vad Lee pass leading to another quick touchdown by Dallas Crawford. Vad Lee would be benched for Justin Thomas who would come in and throw an interception returned for a touchdown on the second play of the drive putting Miami up 45–23. Third string Tech quarterback Tim Byerly would lead the Jackets on their last drive of the day capped off by a Byerly 15 yard run. Miami moved to 5–0 after running out the clock while the Jackets would be handed their second straight loss in ACC play moving them to 2–2 in conference play and 3–2 on the season.
