= 2013 Virginia Tech Hokies football team =

American college football season

2013 Virginia Tech Hokies football

Sun Bowl, L 12–42 vs. UCLA
- Conference: Atlantic Coast Conference
- Coastal Division
- Record: 8–5 (5–3 ACC)
- Head coach: Frank Beamer (27th season)
- Offensive coordinator: Scot Loeffler (1st season)
- Offensive scheme: Pro-style
- Defensive coordinator: Bud Foster (19th season)
- Base defense: 4–4
- Home stadium: Lane Stadium

2013 Atlantic Coast Conference football standings
	Conf.			Overall
Team	W		L	W		L
Atlantic Division
No. 1 Florida State x$#	8	–	0	14	–	0
No. 8 Clemson %	7	–	1	11	–	2
Boston College	4	–	4	7	–	6
Syracuse	4	–	4	7	–	6
Maryland	3	–	5	7	–	6
Wake Forest	2	–	6	4	–	8
NC State	0	–	8	3	–	9
Coastal Division
No. 23 Duke x	6	–	2	10	–	4
Miami (FL)	5	–	3	9	–	4
Virginia Tech	5	–	3	8	–	5
Georgia Tech	5	–	3	7	–	6
North Carolina	4	–	4	7	–	6
Pittsburgh	3	–	5	7	–	6
Virginia	0	–	8	2	–	10
Championship: Florida State 45, Duke 7
# – BCS National Champion; $ – BCS representative as conference champion; % – BCS at-large representative; x – Division champion/co-champions; Rankings from AP Poll

The 2013 Virginia Tech Hokies football team represented the Virginia Polytechnic Institute and State University (Virginia Tech) in the 2013 NCAA Division I FBS football season. The Hokies were led by 27th-year head coach Frank Beamer and played their home games at Lane Stadium in Blacksburg, Virginia. They were members of the Coastal Division of the Atlantic Coast Conference. They finished the season 8–5, 5–3 in ACC play to finish in a three-way tie for second place in the Coastal Division. They were invited to the Sun Bowl where they lost to UCLA. The team's 93 game consecutive sellout streak ended on September 7, 2013 against Western Carolina with an announced attendance of 61,335.

== Personnel ==
=== Coaching staff ===
Name	Position	Seasons at Virginia Tech	Alma mater
Frank Beamer	Head Coach	26	Virginia Tech (1969)
Scot Loeffler	Offensive coordinator/quarterbacks	0	Michigan (1996)
Shane Beamer	Associate head coach/Running Backs	1	Virginia Tech (1999)
Jeff Grimes	Offensive Line/co-Running game coordinator	0	UTEP (1991)
Bryan Stinespring	Tight Ends/recruiting coordinator	22	James Madison (1986)
Aaron Moorehead	Wide Receivers	0	Illinois (2003)
Bud Foster	Defensive coordinator/Inside Linebackers	26	Murray State (1981)
Torrian Gray	Defensive Backs/passing game coordinator	7	Virginia Tech (1996)
Charley Wiles	Defensive line/co-Running game coordinator	15	Murray State (1987)
Cornell Brown	Outside Linebackers/Assistant Defensive Line	2	Virginia Tech (1997)

== Schedule ==
Date	Time	Opponent	Rank	Site	TV	Result	Attendance
August 31	5:30 p.m.	vs. No. 1 Alabama*		Georgia Dome; Atlanta, GA (Chick-fil-A Kickoff Game)	ESPN	L 10–35	73,114
September 7	1:30 p.m.	Western Carolina*		Lane Stadium; Blacksburg, VA	ESPN3	W 45–3	61,335
September 14	12:00 p.m.	at East Carolina*		Dowdy–Ficklen Stadium; Greenville, NC	FS1	W 15–10	50,096
September 21	12:00 p.m.	Marshall*		Lane Stadium; Blacksburg, VA	ESPNU	W 29–21 ^{3OT}	64,060
September 26	7:30 p.m.	at Georgia Tech		Bobby Dodd Stadium; Atlanta, GA (Battle of the Techs)	ESPN	W 17–10	50,214
October 5	12:30 p.m.	North Carolina		Lane Stadium; Blacksburg, VA	ACCN	W 27–17	65,632
October 12	12:00 p.m.	Pittsburgh	No. 24	Lane Stadium; Blacksburg, VA	ESPNU	W 19–9	64,954
October 26	3:30 p.m.	Duke	No. 16	Lane Stadium; Blacksburg, VA	ESPNU	L 10–13	63,326
November 2	12:00 p.m.	at Boston College		Alumni Stadium; Chestnut Hill, MA (rivalry)	ABC/ESPN2	L 27–34	30,129
November 9	7:00 p.m.	at No. 11 Miami (FL)		Sun Life Stadium; Miami Gardens, FL (rivalry)	ESPN	W 42–24	49,267
November 16	12:30 p.m.	Maryland		Lane Stadium; Blacksburg, VA	ACCN	L 24–27 ^{OT}	64,686
November 30	3:30 p.m.	at Virginia		Scott Stadium; Charlottesville, VA (Battle for the Commonwealth Cup)	ESPNU	W 16–6	52,069
December 31	2:00 p.m.	vs. No. 17 UCLA*		Sun Bowl Stadium; El Paso, TX (Sun Bowl)	CBS	L 12–42	47,912
*Non-conference game; Rankings from AP Poll released prior to the game; All times are in Eastern time

== Game summaries ==
=== vs Alabama–Chick-fil-A Kickoff Game ===
	1	2	3	4	Total
Hokies	7	3	0	0	10
#1 Crimson Tide	14	14	7	0	35

Previous meeting was also in the Chick-fil-A Kickoff Game in 2009.

=== Western Carolina ===
	1	2	3	4	Total
Catamounts	0	0	3	0	3
Hokies	7	14	14	10	45

=== @ East Carolina ===
	1	2	3	4	Total
Hokies	7	0	6	2	15
Pirates	7	0	3	0	10

=== Marshall ===
	1	2	3	4	OT	2OT	3OT	Total
Thundering Herd	7	14	0	0	0	0	0	21
Hokies	14	0	0	7	0	0	8	29

=== @ Georgia Tech ===
	1	2	3	4	Total
Hokies	7	7	0	3	17
Yellow Jackets	0	3	7	0	10

=== North Carolina ===
	1	2	3	4	Total
Tar Heels	0	7	3	7	17
Hokies	7	14	0	6	27

=== Pittsburgh ===
	1	2	3	4	Total
Panthers	0	3	0	6	9
#24 Hokies	10	0	6	3	19

=== Duke ===
	1	2	3	4	Total
Blue Devils	0	6	7	0	13
#16 Hokies	0	0	7	3	10

=== @ Boston College ===
	1	2	3	4	Total
Hokies	0	10	7	10	27
Eagles	7	0	10	17	34

=== @ Miami (FL) ===
	1	2	3	4	Total
Hokies	14	14	7	7	42
Hurricanes	7	7	10	0	24

=== Maryland ===
	1	2	3	4	OT	Total
Terrapins	0	14	7	0	6	27
Hokies	7	0	7	7	3	24

=== @ Virginia ===
	1	2	3	4	Total
Hokies	6	10	0	0	16
Cavaliers	3	3	0	0	6

=== UCLA (Sun Bowl) ===
	1	2	3	4	Total
Hokies	7	0	3	2	12
#17 Bruins	7	7	0	28	42

1st quarter scoring: UCLA – Brett Hundley 7-yard run (Kaʻimi Fairbairn kick); VT – J.C. Coleman 1-yard run (Michael Branthover kick)

2nd quarter scoring: UCLA – Hundley 86-yard run (Fairbairn kick)

3rd quarter scoring: VT – Branthover 22-yard field goal

4th quarter scoring: UCLA – Paul Perkins 5-yard run (Fairbairn kick); UCLA – Myles Jack intercepted pass from Mark Leal 24-yards return (Fairbairn kick); VT – Sean Covington 3-yard loss for safety; UCLA – Thomas Duarte 8-yard pass from Hundley (Fairbairn kick); UCLA – Shaquelle Evans 59-yard pass from Hundley (Fairbairn kick)

== Rankings ==
Ranking movements Legend: ██ Increase in ranking ██ Decrease in ranking — = Not ranked RV = Received votes
	Week																
Poll	Pre	1	2	3	4	5	6	7	8	9	10	11	12	13	14	15	Final
AP	RV	RV	RV	RV	RV	RV	24	19	16	RV	—	RV	—	—	—	—	—
Coaches	RV	RV	RV	RV	RV	RV	25	20	19	RV	—	RV	—	—	RV	RV	—
Harris	Not released							20	19	RV	—	RV	—	—	—	—	Not released
BCS	Not released								14	—	—	—	—	—	—	—	Not released
