= 2013 ACC Championship Game =

2013 Dr. Pepper ACC Championship Game
- Conference Championship
Duke Blue Devils	Florida State Seminoles
(10–2)	(12–0)
7	45
Head coach: David Cutcliffe	Head coach: Jimbo Fisher
AP / Coaches / BCS; 20 / 20 / 20	AP / Coaches / BCS; 1 / 1 / 1
	1	2	3	4	Total
Duke	0	0	0	7	7
Florida State	0	17	21	7	45
- Date: December 7, 2013
- Season: 2013
- Stadium: Bank of America Stadium
- Location: Charlotte, North Carolina
- MVP: Jameis Winston (QB, Florida State)
- Favorite: Florida State by 30
- Referee: David Epperley
- Attendance: 67,694

United States TV coverage
- Network: ABC; ESPN Radio
- Announcers: Brent Musburger, Kirk Herbstreit & Heather Cox (ABC); Bill Rosinski, Bill Polian & Joe Schad (ESPN Radio)

2013 Atlantic Coast Conference football standings
	Conf.			Overall
Team	W		L	W		L
Atlantic Division
No. 1 Florida State x$#	8	–	0	14	–	0
No. 8 Clemson %	7	–	1	11	–	2
Boston College	4	–	4	7	–	6
Syracuse	4	–	4	7	–	6
Maryland	3	–	5	7	–	6
Wake Forest	2	–	6	4	–	8
NC State	0	–	8	3	–	9
Coastal Division
No. 23 Duke x	6	–	2	10	–	4
Miami (FL)	5	–	3	9	–	4
Virginia Tech	5	–	3	8	–	5
Georgia Tech	5	–	3	7	–	6
North Carolina	4	–	4	7	–	6
Pittsburgh	3	–	5	7	–	6
Virginia	0	–	8	2	–	10
Championship: Florida State 45, Duke 7
# – BCS National Champion; $ – BCS representative as conference champion; % – BCS at-large representative; x – Division champion/co-champions; Rankings from AP Poll

The 2013 ACC Championship Game was the eighth football championship game for the Atlantic Coast Conference. It featured the Florida State Seminoles, winners of the ACC's Atlantic Division, and the Duke Blue Devils, winners of the ACC's Coastal Division. Duke was the first team other than Georgia Tech or Virginia Tech to represent the Coastal in the ACC Championship Game.

This was the game's fourth consecutive year at Bank of America Stadium in Charlotte, North Carolina.

A 45–7 Florida State win cemented a position for the Seminoles in the national championship game while Duke settled for the Chick-fil-A Bowl. Jameis Winston, quarterback of the Florida State Seminoles, accounted for four total touchdowns (3 passing, 1 rushing) and Devonta Freeman paced the rushing attack with 91 yards on 18 carries and a touchdown in the dominating victory.

Florida State defeated Auburn in the national championship game on January 6, 2014.

== Scoring summary ==
1st quarter scoring: There were no points scored in the 1st quarter.

2nd quarter scoring:

- FSU - TD 12:36 Kelvin Benjamin 14 Yd Pass From Jameis Winston (Roberto Aguayo Kick)
- FSU - TD 03:37 Karlos Williams 12 Yd Run (Roberto Aguayo Kick)
- FSU - FG 00:25 Roberto Aguayo 45 Yd

3rd quarter scoring:

- FSU - TD 09:52 Kenny Shaw 11 Yd Pass From Jameis Winston (Roberto Aguayo Kick)
- FSU - TD 06:31 Kelvin Benjamin 54 Yd Pass From Jameis Winston (Roberto Aguayo Kick)
- FSU - TD 02:38 Jameis Winston 17 Yd Run (Roberto Aguayo Kick)

4th quarter scoring:

- FSU - TD 07:25 Devonta Freeman 7 Yd Run (Roberto Aguayo Kick)
- Duke - TD 01:01 Josh Snead 5 Yd Run (Ross Martin Kick)

=== Statistics ===
Statistics	Duke	FSU
First downs	15	31
Total yards	239	569
Rushes-yards (net)	31–99	43–239
Passing yards (net)	140	330
Passes, Comp-Att-Int	21–42–2	19–32–2
Time of Possession	30:44	29:16
