= 2013 Wake Forest Demon Deacons football team =

American college football season

2013 Wake Forest Demon Deacons football
- Conference: Atlantic Coast Conference
- Atlantic Division
- Record: 4–8 (2–6 ACC)
- Head coach: Jim Grobe (13th season)
- Offensive coordinator: Steed Lobotzke (11th season)
- Offensive scheme: Spread
- Defensive coordinator: Brian Knorr (3rd season)
- Base defense: Multiple
- Captain: Game captains
- Home stadium: BB&T Field

2013 Atlantic Coast Conference football standings
	Conf.			Overall
Team	W		L	W		L
Atlantic Division
No. 1 Florida State x$#	8	–	0	14	–	0
No. 8 Clemson %	7	–	1	11	–	2
Boston College	4	–	4	7	–	6
Syracuse	4	–	4	7	–	6
Maryland	3	–	5	7	–	6
Wake Forest	2	–	6	4	–	8
NC State	0	–	8	3	–	9
Coastal Division
No. 23 Duke x	6	–	2	10	–	4
Miami (FL)	5	–	3	9	–	4
Virginia Tech	5	–	3	8	–	5
Georgia Tech	5	–	3	7	–	6
North Carolina	4	–	4	7	–	6
Pittsburgh	3	–	5	7	–	6
Virginia	0	–	8	2	–	10
Championship: Florida State 45, Duke 7
# – BCS National Champion; $ – BCS representative as conference champion; % – BCS at-large representative; x – Division champion/co-champions; Rankings from AP Poll

The 2013 Wake Forest Demon Deacons football team represented Wake Forest University during the 2013 NCAA Division I FBS football season. The team was coached by Jim Grobe, who coached his 13th season at the school, and played its home games at BB&T Field. Wake Forest competed in the Atlantic Coast Conference, as they have since the league's inception in 1953, and were in the Atlantic Division. They finished the season 4–8, 2–6 in ACC play to finish in sixth place in the Atlantic Division.

The team introduced two new helmets, a matte black with a gold "WF" logo and a white version of the normal black helmet. The white helmet made its debut against Boston College on September 6. The matte black helmet made its debut on October 5 against rival NC State.

After posting a fifth consecutive losing season, head coach Jim Grobe resigned at the end of the season after a 13-year record of 77–82. On December 10, Wake Forest hired Bowling Green head coach Dave Clawson as Grobe's replacement.

== Recruiting ==
On national signing day, the Demon Deacons received letters of intent from 25 players.

College recruiting information
Name	Hometown	School	Height	Weight	40^{‡}	Commit date
John Armstrong; RB	Orlando, FL	Olympia HS	5 ft 9 in (1.75 m)	165 lb (75 kg)	4.50	Jan 26, 2013
John Armstrong; RB	Recruit ratings: Scout: Rivals: (75)					
Taylor Chambers; OL	Columbia, SC	Irmo HS	6 ft 8 in (2.03 m)	300 lb (140 kg)	5.30	Jun 7, 2012
Taylor Chambers; OL	Recruit ratings: Scout: Rivals: (71)					
Deonte Davis; CB	Snellville, GA	South Gwinnett HS	5 ft 10 in (1.78 m)	170 lb (77 kg)	4.50	Feb 3, 2013
Deonte Davis; CB	Recruit ratings: Scout: Rivals: (NR)					
Wendell Dunn; OLB	Miami, FL	Palmetto HS	6 ft 3 in (1.91 m)	210 lb (95 kg)	4.60	Dec 13, 2012
Wendell Dunn; OLB	Recruit ratings: Scout: Rivals: (74)					
Duke Ejiofor; OLB	Houston, TX	Alief Taylor HS	6 ft 4 in (1.93 m)	220 lb (100 kg)	4.60	Jan 27, 2013
Duke Ejiofor; OLB	Recruit ratings: Scout: Rivals: (77)					
Cameron Gardner; OL	Bailey, NC	Southern Nash HS	6 ft 5 in (1.96 m)	275 lb (125 kg)	N/A	Jun 4, 2012
Cameron Gardner; OL	Recruit ratings: Scout: Rivals: (71)					
Josh Harris; RB	Milton, GA	Milton HS	6 ft 4 in (1.93 m)	290 lb (130 kg)	N/A	Jun 7, 2012
Josh Harris; RB	Recruit ratings: Scout: Rivals: (74)					
Tyree Harris; WR	Marietta, GA	Marietta HS	6 ft 3 in (1.91 m)	180 lb (82 kg)	4.46	Jul 23, 2012
Tyree Harris; WR	Recruit ratings: Scout: Rivals: (77)					
Andrew Hauser; DE	Covina, CA	Charter Oak HS	6 ft 3 in (1.91 m)	265 lb (120 kg)	N/A	Feb 5, 2013
Andrew Hauser; DE	Recruit ratings: Scout: Rivals: (NR)					
Cory Helms; C	Alpharetta, GA	Milton HS	6 ft 4 in (1.93 m)	290 lb (130 kg)	5.40	Jun 6, 2012
Cory Helms; C	Recruit ratings: Scout: Rivals: (75)					
Ford Howell; LB	Memphis, TN	University School	6 ft 1 in (1.85 m)	225 lb (102 kg)	4.70	Jul 12, 2012
Ford Howell; LB	Recruit ratings: Scout: Rivals: (76)					
Ali Lamot; OLB	Mebane, NC	Eastern Alamance HS	6 ft 2 in (1.88 m)	220 lb (100 kg)	N/A	Jun 18, 2012
Ali Lamot; OLB	Recruit ratings: Scout: Rivals: (75)					
Jalen Latter; CB	Charlotte, NC	Vance HS	6 ft 0 in (1.83 m)	185 lb (84 kg)	4.50	Jan 20, 2013
Jalen Latter; CB	Recruit ratings: Scout: Rivals: (79)					
Marquell Lee; LB	Waldorf, MD	Westlake HS	6 ft 3 in (1.91 m)	200 lb (91 kg)	N/A	Oct 11, 2012
Marquell Lee; LB	Recruit ratings: Scout: Rivals: (72)					
James Looney; DL	Lake Worth, FL	Lake Worth HS	6 ft 3 in (1.91 m)	275 lb (125 kg)	4.90	Nov 1, 2012
James Looney; DL	Recruit ratings: Scout: Rivals: (74)					
Brendan O'Neil; TE	Burlington, MA	Buckingham Browne & Nichols HS	6 ft 4 in (1.93 m)	220 lb (100 kg)	N/A	Jun 14, 2012
Brendan O'Neil; TE	Recruit ratings: Scout: Rivals: (69)					
Josh Okonye; CB	Sugar Land, TX	George Ranch HS	6 ft 0 in (1.83 m)	185 lb (84 kg)	N/A	Dec 27, 2012
Josh Okonye; CB	Recruit ratings: Scout: Rivals: (69)					
Michael Radford; QB	Charlotte, NC	Charlotte Country Day School	6 ft 3 in (1.91 m)	215 lb (98 kg)	4.70	Jun 14, 2012
Michael Radford; QB	Recruit ratings: Scout: Rivals: (74)					
Cam Serigne; TE	Ashburn, VA	Briar Woods HS	6 ft 3 in (1.91 m)	225 lb (102 kg)	N/A	Jun 12, 2012
Cam Serigne; TE	Recruit ratings: Scout: Rivals: (72)					
Michael Stevenson; S	Clearwater, FL	Central Catholic HS	6 ft 0 in (1.83 m)	175 lb (79 kg)	4.50	Dec 19, 2012
Michael Stevenson; S	Recruit ratings: Scout: Rivals: (76)					
Julian Thomas-Jackson; OLB	Dothan, AL	Dothan HS	6 ft 4 in (1.93 m)	210 lb (95 kg)	N/A	Jan 26, 2013
Julian Thomas-Jackson; OLB	Recruit ratings: Scout: Rivals: (79)					
Lance Virgile; OLB	Fort Lauderdale, FL	St. Thomas HS	6 ft 2 in (1.88 m)	220 lb (100 kg)	4.60	Dec 11, 2012
Lance Virgile; OLB	Recruit ratings: Scout: Rivals: (81)					
Brad Watson; CB	Round Rock, TX	Westwood HS	6 ft 0 in (1.83 m)	170 lb (77 kg)	N/A	Jun 7, 2012
Brad Watson; CB	Recruit ratings: Scout: Rivals: (74)					
Mike Weaver; P/PK	Pine City, NY	Elmira Southside HS	6 ft 1 in (1.85 m)	180 lb (82 kg)	N/A	Jan 27, 2013
Mike Weaver; P/PK	Recruit ratings: Scout: Rivals: (NR)					
Dez Wortham; RB	Frisco, TX	Hebron HS	6 ft 0 in (1.83 m)	205 lb (93 kg)	4.48	Dec 4, 2012
Dez Wortham; RB	Recruit ratings: Scout: Rivals: (76)					
Overall recruit ranking: Scout: 60 Rivals: 58
‡ Refers to 40-yard dash; Note: In many cases, Scout, Rivals, 247Sports, On3, and ESPN may conflict in their listings of height, weight and 40 time.; In these cases, the average was taken. ESPN grades are on a 100-point scale.; Sources: "Wake Forest 2013 Football Commitments". Rivals.; "2013 Wake Forest Commits". Scout.; "2013 Player Commitments – Wake Forest". ESPN.; "Scout.com Team Recruiting Rankings". Scout.; "2013 Team Ranking". Rivals.com.

== Schedule ==
Date	Time	Opponent	Site	TV	Result	Attendance
August 29	6:30 pm	Presbyterian*	BB&T Field; Winston-Salem, NC	ESPN3	W 31–7	26,202
September 6	8:00 pm	at Boston College	Alumni Stadium; Chestnut Hill, MA	ESPN2	L 10–24	32,465
September 14	12:30 pm	Louisiana–Monroe*	BB&T Field; Winston-Salem, NC	RSN	L 19–21	26,505
September 21	12:00 pm	at Army*	Michie Stadium; West Point, NY	CBSSN	W 25–11	33,610
September 28	3:30 pm	at No. 4 Clemson	Memorial Stadium; Clemson, SC	ESPNU	L 7–56	80,607
October 5	3:30 pm	NC State	BB&T Field; Winston-Salem, NC (rivalry)	RSN	W 28–13	30,642
October 19	3:30 pm	Maryland^{†}	BB&T Field; Winston-Salem, NC	ESPNU	W 34–10	27,807
October 26	12:00 pm	at No. 6 Miami (FL)	Sun Life Stadium; Miami Gardens, FL	ESPNU	L 21–24	66,160
November 2	12:30 pm	at Syracuse	Carrier Dome; Syracuse, NY	RSN	L 0–13	38,550
November 9	12:00 pm	No. 3 Florida State	BB&T Field; Winston-Salem, NC	ABC	L 3–59	30,865
November 23	12:00 pm	No. 24 Duke	BB&T Field; Winston-Salem, NC (rivalry)	ESPN2	L 21–28	28,463
November 30	12:21 pm	at Vanderbilt*	Vanderbilt Stadium; Nashville, TN	SECTV	L 21–23	33,019
*Non-conference game; ^{†}Homecoming; Rankings from Coaches Poll released prior to the game; All times are in Eastern time

== Roster ==
2013 Wake Forest Demon Deacons roster
Offense Quarterbacks: 4 Tyler Cameron – (redshirt) Freshman; 6 Patrick Thompson – (redshirt) Junior; 8 Kevin Sousa – (redshirt) Sophomore; 9 Michael Radford – Freshman; 10 Tanner Price – Senior; 15 Brendan Wood – Freshman; 17 Pat Long – (redshirt) Sophomore; Running backs: 14 Dominique Gibson – (redshirt) Freshman; 20 Joshua Wilhite – (redshirt) Freshman; 21 Deandre Martin – (redshirt) Sophomore; 24 Dezmond Wortham – Freshman; 25 Josh Harris – (redshirt) Senior; Fullbacks: 32 Charles Argenzio – Freshman; 43 Jordan Garside – (redshirt) Junior; 44 Ben Emert – (redshirt) Junior; Wide receivers: 2 Matt James – (redshirt) Junior; 3 Michael Campanaro – (redshirt) Senior; 5 Orville Reynolds – Junior; 7 Maddox Stamey – (redshirt) Freshman; 11 Airyn Willis – (redshirt) Sophomore; 12 Tyree Harris – Freshman; 18 John Armstrong – Freshman; 26 Sherman Ragland III – (redshirt) Sophomore; 82 P.J. Howard IV – (redshirt) Sophomore; 83 Jonathan Williams – (redshirt) Freshman; 86 Brandon Terry – (redshirt) Junior; 87 Brad Idzik – (redshirt) Junior; 88 Jared Crump – (redshirt) Freshman; Tight ends: 45 Zach Gordon – (redshirt) Freshman; 49 Spencer Stone – Freshman; 80 Anthony Rook – (redshirt) Freshman; 81 Daniel Vogelsang – (redshirt) Junior; 84 Brendan O'Neill – Freshman; 85 Cam Serigne – Freshman; 89 Spencer Bishop – (redshirt) Senior; Offensive Linemen: 51 Cory Helms – Freshman; 59 Antonio Ford – (redshirt) Junior; 60 Whit Barnes – (redshirt) Senior; 62 Reid Althoff – Freshman; 63 Dylan Intemann – (redshirt) Sophomore; 65 Josh T. Harris – Freshman; 66 Rocco Esposito – Freshman; 67 Taylor Chambers – Freshman; 68 Colin Summers – (redshirt) Junior; 71 Hunter Goodwin – (redshirt) Sophomore; 72 Cody Preble – (redshirt) Sophomore; 73 Steven Chase – (redshirt) Senior; 74 Neil Basford – (redshirt) Junior; 75 Frank Souza – (redshirt) Senior; 76 Joel Suggs – (redshirt) Freshman; 77 Will Smith – (redshirt) Freshman; 78 Tyler Hayworth – (redshirt) Freshman; 79 Cameron Gardner – Freshman	Defense Defensive ends: 36 Tylor Harris – Sophomore; 58 Josh Banks – (redshirt) Freshman; 90 Kristopher Redding – (redshirt) Senior; 94 Desmond Floyd – (redshirt) Sophomore; 98 Zach Thompson – (redshirt) Senior; 99 James Looney – Freshman; Defensive tackles: 50 Nikita Whitlock – (redshirt) Senior; 56 Andrew Hauser – Freshman; 91 Johnny Garcia – (redshirt) Junior; 95 Shelldon Lewinson – (redshirt) Freshman; Linebackers: 28 Teddy Matthews – (redshirt) Freshman; 30 Hunter Williams – (redshirt) Sophomore; 32 Ford Howell – Freshman; 34 Wendell Dunn – Freshman; 35 Zachary Allen – (redshirt) Junior; 37 Kevis Jones – (redshirt) Freshman; 39 Justin Jackson – (redshirt) Senior; 40 Marquel Lee – Freshman; 41 Mike Olson – (redshirt) Senior; 42 Julian Thomas-Jackson – Freshman; 43 Grant Dawson – Freshman; 45 Nick Karp – Freshman; 46 Steve Donatell – (redshirt) Freshman; 48 Brandon Chubb – (redshirt) Sophomore; 49 Lance Virgile – Freshman; 53 Duke Ejiofor – Freshman; 54 Britt Cherry – (redshirt) Sophomore; 55 Brad Demuth – (redshirt) Freshman; 57 Ali Lamot – Freshman; Cornerbacks: 7 Merrill Noel – (redshirt) Junior; 9 Kevin Johnson – (redshirt) Junior; 13 Jalen Latter – Freshman; 15 Allen Ramsey – (redshirt) Sophomore; 20 Chuck Schlegel – (redshirt) Junior; 21 Josh M. Harris – Sophomore; 23 James Ward – Sophomore; 24 Josh Okonye – Freshman; 25 Brad Watson – Freshman; 29 Deonte Davis – Freshman; Safeties: 11 Anthony Wooding Jr. – Junior; 12 Michael Stevenson – Freshman; 17 A.J. Marshall – Senior; 22 Ryan Janvion – (redshirt) Freshman; 26 Thomas Brown – Freshman	Special teams Placekickers: 18 Mike Weaver – Freshman; 27 Chad Hedlund – (redshirt) Sophomore; Punters: 18 Mike Weaver – Freshman; 38 Alexander Kinal – (redshirt) Sophomore; Long Snappers: 52 Logan Feimster – (redshirt) Junior; 61 Ryan Bauder – (redshirt) Sophomore; 64 Chase Wilson – Freshman; Kick returners: 5 Orville Reynolds – Junior; 12 Tyree Harris – Freshman; 18 John Armstrong – Freshman; 25 Josh Harris – (redshirt) Senior; Punt Returners: 3 Michael Campanaro – (redshirt) Senior; 9 Kevin Johnson – (redshirt) Junior; 88 Jared Crump – (redshirt) Freshman

== Coaching staff ==
Position	Name	First year at WFU
Head coach	Jim Grobe	2001
Inside Linebackers	Warren Belin	2013
Passing game coordinator/quarterbacks	Tom Elrod	2003
Offensive line	Jonathan Himebauch	2012
Secondary	Derrick Jackson	2012
Defensive coordinator/linebackers	Brian Knorr	2008
Offensive coordinator/running backs, Tight Ends & Fullbacks	Steed Lobotzke	2001
Recruiting coordinator/defensive line	Ray McCartney	2001
Associate head coach/special teams	Billy Mitchell	2001
Wide receivers	Taylor Stubblefield	2013

== Game summaries ==
=== Presbyterian ===
12th meeting. 6–4–1 all time. Last meeting 2010, 53–13 Demon Deacons in Winston-Salem.

Week One: Presbyterian Blue Hose at Wake Forest Demon Deacons – Game summary

Quarter	1	2	3	4	Total
Blue Hose	7	0	0	0	7
Demon Deacons	3	14	7	7	31

at BB&T Field, Winston-Salem, North Carolina

- Date: August 29
- Game time: 6:30 p.m. EST
- Game weather: 82° F
- Game attendance: 26,202
- Referee: Jerry Magallanes
- TV announcers (ESPN3): Roy Philpott, Brian Kinchen, and Angela Mallen
- Final Stats

Game information

First quarter

- PRES – Kris Hurley 1-yard pass from Tamyn Garrick (Brett Wilson kick), 11:18. Blue Hose 7–0. Drive: 4 plays, 70 yards, 1:50.
- WFU – Chad Hedlund 31-yard field goal, 2:16. Blue Hose 7–3. Drive: 9 plays, 35 yards, 5:16.

Second quarter

- WFU – Spencer Bishop 20-yard pass from Tanner Price (Chad Hedlund kick), 13:42. Demon Deacons 10–7. Drive: 5 plays, 34 yards, 2:06.
- WFU – Tanner Price 3-yard run (Chad Hedlund kick), 3:18. Demon Deacons 17–7. Drive: 5 plays, 64 yards, 2:36.

Third quarter

- WFU – Brandon Chubb 29-yard interception return (Chad Hedlund kick), 11:33. Demon Deacons 24–7.

Fourth quarter

- WFU – Joshua Wilhite 21-yard run (Chad Hedlund kick), 12:46. Demon Deacons 31–7. Drive: 1 plays, 21 yards, 0:08.

Leading Passers

- PRES – T. Garrick 9/15 Comp/Att 36 Yds, 1 TD, 3 Int
- WFU – T. Price 14/25 Comp/Att 219 Yds, 1 TD

Leading Rushers

- PRES – D. Rouse 9 Rushes 87 Yds. 9.7 Avg 66 Lng.
- WFU – J. Armstrong 6 Rushes 38 Yds. 6.3 Avg 12 Lng.

Leading Receivers

- PRES – A. Williams 3 Rec. 15 Yds. 5.0 Avg 9 Lng.
- WFU – J. Williams 5 Rec. 143 Yds. 28.6 Avg 53 Lng.

Leading Tacklers

- PRES – S. Moreland 5 Tack 6 Ast
- WFU – M. Olson 5 Tack 2 Ast

=== Boston College ===
21st meeting. 8–10–2 all time. Last meeting 2012, 28–14 Demon Deacons in Winston-Salem.

Week Two: Wake Forest Demon Deacons at Boston College Eagles – Game summary

Quarter	1	2	3	4	Total
Demon Deacons	7	0	0	3	10
Eagles	10	7	7	0	24

at Alumni Stadium, Chestnut Hill, Massachusetts

- Date: September 6
- Game time: 8:00 p.m. EST
- Game weather: 62° F
- Game attendance: 32,465
- Referee: Brad Allen
- TV announcers (ESPN2): Carter Blackburn, Danny Kanell, and Allison Williams
- Final Stats

Game information

First quarter

- BC – Alex Amidon 26-yard pass from Chase Rettig (Nate Freese Kick), 13:37. Eagles 7–0. Drive: 2 plays, 27 yards, 0:29.
- WFU – Michael Campanaro 30-yard pass from Tanner Price (Chad Hedlund kick), 2:48. Tied 7–7. Drive: 10 plays, 76 yards, 5:36.
- BC – Nate Freese 33-yard field goal, 0:48. Eagles 10–7. Drive: 5 plays, 59 yards, 2:00.

Second quarter

- BC – Spiffy Evans 22-yard pass from Chase Rettig (Nate Freese Kick), 14:55. Eagles 17–7. Drive: 1 plays, 22 yards, 0:05.

Third quarter

- BC – Andre Williams 2-yard run (Nate Freese kick), 1:54. Eagles 24–7. Drive: 7 plays, 47 yards, 3:22.

Fourth quarter

- WFU – Chad Hedlund 26-yard field goal, 10:17. Eagles 24–10. Drive: 14 plays, 66 yards, 6:37.

Leading Passers

- WFU – T. Price 18/30 Comp/Att 191 Yds, 1 TD, 1 Int
- BC – C. Rettig 7/14 Comp/Att 123 Yds, 2 TD, 1 Int

Leading Rushers

- WFU – J. Harris 10 Rushes 18 Yds. 1.8 Avg 6 Lng.
- BC – A. Williams 35 Rushes 204 Yds. 5.8 Avg 31 Lng. 1 TD

Leading Receivers

- WFU – M. Campanaro 5 Rec. 86 Yds. 17.2 Avg 30 Lng. 1 TD
- BC – A. Amidon 5 Rec. 93 Yds. 18.6 Avg 51 Lng. 1 TD

Leading Tacklers

- WFU – N. Whitlock 6 Tack 1 Ast 2 Sack
- BC – K. Pierre-Louis 7 Tack 4 Ast

=== Louisiana-Monroe ===
1st meeting

Week Three: Louisiana-Monroe Warhawks at Wake Forest Demon Deacons – Game summary

Quarter	1	2	3	4	Total
Warhawks	7	7	7	0	21
Demon Deacons	7	6	0	6	19

at BB&T Field, Winston-Salem, North Carolina

- Date: September 14
- Game time: 12:30 p.m. EST
- Game weather: 67° F
- Game attendance: 26,505
- Referee: Perry Havener
- TV announcers (RSN): Wes Durham, Brian Stann, and Jenn Hildreth
- Final Stats

Game information

First quarter

- ULM – Harley Scioneaux 1-yard pass from Kolton Browning (Justin Manton kick), 8:14. Warhawks 7–0. Drive: 17 plays, 69 yards, 6:46.
- WFU – Orville Reynolds 65-yard pass from Tanner Price (Chad Hedlund kick), 5:16. Tied 7–7. Drive: 4 plays, 80 yards, 1:27.

Second quarter

- WFU – Chad Hedlund 28-yard field goal, 14:49. Demon Deacons 10–7. Drive: 10 plays, 37 yards, 3:53.
- ULM – Kenzee Jackson 5-yard pass from Kolton Browning (Justin Manton kick), 0:41. Warhawks 14–10. Drive: 14 plays, 81 yards, 3:58.
- WFU – Chad Hedlund 38-yard field goal, 0:00. Warhawks 14–13. Drive: 8 plays, 54 yards, 0:41.

Third quarter

- ULM – Tavarese Maye 9-yard pass from Kolton Browning (Justin Manton kick), 9:22. Warhawks 21–13. Drive: 12 plays, 74 yards, 4:34.

Fourth quarter

- WFU – Orville Reynolds 23-yard pass from Tanner Price (2pt conversion failed), 0:04. Warhawks 21–19. Drive: 11 plays, 97 yards, 1:55.

Leading Passers

- ULM – K. Browning 43/68 Comp/Att 315 Yds, 3 TD, 2 Int
- WFU – T. Price 28/47 Comp/Att 310 Yds, 2 TD

Leading Rushers

- ULM – J. Edwards 17 Rushes 61 Yds. 3.6 Avg 15 Lng.
- WFU – J. Harris 4 Rushes 8 Yds. 2.0 Avg 6 Lng.

Leading Receivers

- ULM – R. Ceaser 10 Rec. 84 Yds. 8.4 Avg 19 Lng.
- WFU – M. Campanaro 16 Rec. 177 Yds. 11.1 Avg 31 Lng.

Leading Tacklers

- ULM – I. Newsome 6 Tack 1 Ast
- WFU – M. Olson 8 Tack 4 Ast

=== Army ===
13th meeting. 8–4 all time. Last meeting 2012, 49–37 Demon Deacons in Winston-Salem.

Week Four: Wake Forest Demon Deacons at Army Black Knights – Game summary

Quarter	1	2	3	4	Total
Demon Deacons	0	10	8	7	25
Black Knights	2	3	6	0	11

at Michie Stadium, West Point, New York

- Date: September 21
- Game time: 12:00 p.m. EST
- Game attendance: 33,610
- Referee: Dennis Hennigan
- TV announcers (CBSSN): Ben Holden, Tom Bradley, and Kristine Leahy
- Final Stats

Game information

First quarter

- ARMY – Richard Glover tackles Josh Harris for Safety, 3:14. Black Knights 2–0.

Second quarter

- WFU – Chad Hedlund 35-yard field goal, 9:39. Demon Deacons 3–2. Drive: 12 plays, 22 yards, 5:52.
- WFU – Michael Campanaro 66-yard pass from Tanner Price (Chad Hedlund kick), 1:28. Demon Deacons 10–2. Drive: 2 plays, 77 yards, 0:33.
- ARMY – Daniel Grochowski 39-yard field goal, 0:38. Demon Deacons 10–5. Drive: 5 plays, 53 yards, 0:50.

Third quarter

- ARMY – Daniel Grochowski 32-yard field goal, 10:05. Demon Deacons 10–8. Drive: 6 plays, 21 yards, 3:09.
- ARMY – Daniel Grochowski 32-yard field goal, 3:44. Black Knights 11–10. Drive: 11 plays, 54 yards, 5:18.
- WFU – Josh Harris 15-yard run (2 point conversion successful), 1:42. Demon Deacons 18–11. Drive: 5 plays, 75 yards, 2:02.

Fourth quarter

- WFU – Josh Harris 6-yard run (Chad Hedlund kick), 9:01. Demon Deacons 25–11. Drive: 9 plays, 62 yards, 4:38.

Leading Passers

- WFU – T. Price 6/17 Comp/Att 132 Yds, 1 TD, 1 Int
- ARMY – K. White 5/6 Comp/Att 45 Yds

Leading Rushers

- WFU – J. Harris 19 Rushes 96 Yds. 5.1 Avg 23 Lng. 2 TD
- ARMY – T. Baggett 16 Rushes 125 Yds. 7.8 Avg 51 Lng.

Leading Receivers

- WFU – M. Campanaro 4 Rec. 91 Yds. 22.8 Avg 66 Lng. 1 TD
- ARMY – X. Moss 8 Rec. 61 Yds. 7.6 Avg 16 Lng.

Leading Tacklers

- WFU – N. Whitlock 7 Tack 7 Ast
- ARMY – T. Holloway 5 Tack 3 Ast 1 Sck

=== Clemson ===
79th meeting. 17–60–1 all time. Last meeting 2012, 42–13 Tigers in Winston-Salem.

Week Five: Wake Forest Demon Deacons at Clemson Tigers – Game summary

Quarter	1	2	3	4	Total
Demon Deacons	7	0	0	0	7
#4 Tigers	21	14	14	7	56

at Memorial Stadium, Clemson, South Carolina

- Date: September 28
- Game time: 3:30 p.m. EST
- Game weather: 74° F
- Game attendance: 80,607
- Referee: Gary Patterson
- TV announcers (ESPNU): Anish Shroff and Kelly Stouffer
- Final Stats

Game information

First quarter

- CLM – Sammy Watkins 64-yard pass from Tajh Boyd (Chandler Catanzaro kick), 14:14. Tigers 7–0. Drive: 3 plays, 82 yards, 0:46.
- CLM – Zac Brooks 10-yard run (Chandler Catanzaro kick), 9:56. Tigers 14–0. Drive: 10 plays, 63 yards, 2:50.
- CLM – D.J. Howard 75-yard pass from Tajh Boyd (Chandler Catanzaro kick), 7:32. Tigers 21–0. Drive: 3 plays, 80 yards, 1:03.
- WFU – Sherman Ragland III 10-yard pass from Tanner Price (Chad Hedlund kick), 1:17. Tigers 21–7. Drive: 8 plays, 54 yards, 3:05.

Second quarter

- CLM – Tajh Boyd 2-yard run (Chandler Catanzaro kick), 4:57. Tigers 28–7. Drive: 7 plays, 67 yards, 2:47.
- CLM – Mike Williams 14-yard pass from Tajh Boyd (Chandler Catanzaro kick), 0:27. Tigers 35–7. Drive: 8 plays, 72 yards, 2:00.

Third quarter

- CLM – C.J. Davidson 1-yard run (Chandler Catanzaro kick), 6:41. Tigers 42–7. Drive: 10 plays, 46 yards, 3:40.
- CLM – Jordan Leggett 18-yard pass from Cole Stoudt (Chandler Catanzaro kick), 1:11. Tigers 49–7. Drive: 9 plays, 64 yards, 2:57.

Fourth quarter

- CLM – C.J. Davidson 1-yard run (Chandler Catanzaro kick), 9:21. Tigers 56–7. Drive: 12 plays, 56 yards, 4:53.

Leading Passers

- WFU – T. Price 14/22 Comp/Att 125 Yds, 1 TD
- CLM – T. Boyd 17/24 Comp/Att 311 Yds, 3 TD

Leading Rushers

- WFU – T. Cameron 6 Rushes 21 Yds. 3.5 Avg 9 Lng.
- CLM – T. Boyd 17 Rushes 69 Yds. 4.1 Avg 13 Lng. 1 TD

Leading Receivers

- WFU – M. Campanaro 7 Rec. 75 Yds. 10.7 Avg 17 Lng.
- CLM – S. Watkins 6 Rec. 113 Yds. 18.8 Avg 64 Lng. 1 TD

Leading Tacklers

- WFU – B. Chubb/T. Matthews 7 Tack 2 Ast
- CLM – B. Breeland 4 Tack 1 Ast 1 Sck

=== NC State ===
107th meeting. 37–63–6 all time. Last meeting 2012, 37–6 Wolfpack in Raleigh.

Week Six: NC State Wolfpack at Wake Forest Demon Deacons – Game summary

Quarter	1	2	3	4	Total
Wolfpack	0	10	3	0	13
Demon Deacons	7	7	7	7	28

at BB&T Field, Winston-Salem, North Carolina

- Date: October 5
- Game time: 3:30 p.m. EST
- Game weather: 85° F
- Game attendance: 30,642
- Referee: Riley Johnson
- TV announcers (RSN): Wes Durham, Brian Stann, and Jenn Hildreth
- Final Stats

Game information

First quarter

- WFU – Tanner Price 1-yard run (Chad Hedlund kick), 2:14. Demon Deacons 7–0. Drive: 13 plays, 80 yards, 5:52.

Second quarter

- NCST – Niklas Sade 27-yard field goal, 8:28. Demon Deacons 7–3. Drive: 8 plays, 33 yards, 3:12.
- NCST – Quintin Payton 11-yard pass from Pete Thomas (Niklas Sade kick), 0:39. Wolfpack 10–7. Drive: 10 plays, 67 yards, 1:19.
- WFU – Michael Campanaro 10-yard pass from Tanner Price (Chad Hedlund kick), 0:06. Demon Deacons 14–10. Drive: 5 plays, 75 yards, 0:33.

Third quarter

- WFU – Jared Crump 3-yard pass from Tanner Price (Chad Hedlund kick), 7:25. Demon Deacons 21–10. Drive: 10 plays, 87 yards, 4:14.
- NCST – Niklas Sade 20-yard field goal, 4:47. Demon Deacons 21–13. Drive: 8 plays, 55 yards, 2:31.

Fourth quarter

- WFU – Michael Campanaro 27-yard pass from Tanner Price (Chad Hedlund kick), 10:43. Demon Deacons 28–13. Drive: 10 plays, 80 yards, 3:58.

Leading Passers

- NCST – P. Thomas 27/43 Comp/Att 257 Yds, 1 TD, 2 Int
- WFU – T. Price 24/39 Comp/Att 268 Yds, 3 TD, 1 Int

Leading Rushers

- NCST – P. Thomas 15 Rushes 60 Yds. 4.0 Avg 22 Lng.
- WFU – T. Price 18 Rushes 82 Yds. 4.6 Avg 16 Lng. 1 TD

Leading Receivers

- NCST – Q. Payton 6 Rec. 98 Yds. 16.3 Avg 34 Lng. 1 TD
- WFU – M. Campanaro 12 Rec. 153 Yds. 12.8 Avg 38 Lng. 2 TD

Leading Tacklers

- NCST – D. Johnson 7 Tack
- WFU – R. Janvion 7 Tack 4 Ast

=== Maryland ===
62nd meeting. 17–43–1 all time. Last meeting 2012, 19–14 Terrapins in College Park.

Week Eight: Maryland Terrapins at Wake Forest Demon Deacons – Game summary

Quarter	1	2	3	4	Total
Terrapins	0	3	7	0	10
Demon Deacons	10	14	7	3	34

at BB&T Field, Winston-Salem, North Carolina

- Date: October 19
- Game time: 3:30 p.m. EST
- Game weather: 60° F
- Game attendance: 27,807
- Referee: Dennis Hennigan
- TV announcers (ESPNU): Anish Shroff and Kelly Stouffer
- Final Stats

Game information

First quarter

- WFU – Josh Harris 1-yard run (Chad Hedlund kick), 10:37. Demon Deacons 7–0. Drive: 5 plays, 36 yards, 2:25.
- WFU – Chad Hedlund 51-yard field goal, 0:00. Demon Deacons 10–0. Drive: 6 plays, 14 yards, 2:12.

Second quarter

- MD – Brad Craddock 23-yard field goal, 10:00. Demon Deacons 10–3. Drive: 13 plays, 67 yards, 5:00.
- WFU – Tanner Price 4-yard run (Chad Hedlund kick), 5:21. Demon Deacons 17–3. Drive: 3 plays, 18 yards, 1:12.
- WFU – Tanner Price 4-yard pass from Michael Campanaro (Chad Hedlund kick), 1:21. Demon Deacons 24–3. Drive: 5 plays, 40 yards, 2:08.

Third quarter

- MD – Levern Jacobs 56-yard pass from Caleb Rowe (Brad Craddock kick), 7:47. Demon Deacons 24–10. Drive: 2 plays, 73 yards, 0:36.
- WFU – Michael Campanaro 10-yard pass from Tanner Price (Chad Hedlund kick), 2:54. Demon Deacons 31–10. Drive: 9 plays, 88 yards, 4:47.

Fourth quarter

- WFU – Chad Hedlund 38-yard field goal, 7:46. Demon Deacons 34–10. Drive: 10 plays, 37 yards, 4:28.

Leading Passers

- MD – C. Rowe 12/27 Comp/Att 207 Yds, 1 TD
- WFU – T. Price 26/35 Comp/Att 230 Yds, 1 TD

Leading Rushers

- MD – B. Ross 8 Rushes 39 Yds. 4.9 Avg 15 Lng.
- WFU – J. Harris 9 Rushes 48 Yds. 5.3 Avg 28 Lng. 1 TD

Leading Receivers

- MD – L. Jacobs 3 Rec. 80 Yds. 26.7 Avg 56 Lng. 1 TD
- WFU – M. Campanaro 11 Rec. 122 Yds. 11.1 Avg 27 Lng. 1 TD

Leading Tacklers

- MD – W. Likely 5 Tack 3 Ast
- WFU – B. Chubb 4 Tack 4 Ast

=== Miami ===
11th meeting. 3–7 all time. Last meeting 2009, 28–27 Hurricanes in Winston-Salem.

Week Nine: Wake Forest Demon Deacons at Miami Hurricanes – Game summary

Quarter	1	2	3	4	Total
Demon Deacons	7	7	0	7	21
#6 Hurricanes	0	10	0	14	24

at Sun Life Stadium, Miami Gardens, Florida

- Date: October 26
- Game time: 12:00 p.m. EST
- Game weather: 80° F
- Game attendance: 66,160
- Referee: Pat Garvey
- TV announcers (ESPNU): Tom Hart and John Congemi
- Final Stats

Game information

First quarter

- WFU – Josh Harris 12-yard run (Chad Hedlund kick), 6:36. Demon Deacons 7–0. Drive: 16 plays, 79 yards, 8:34.

Second quarter

- MIA – Matt Goudis 34-yard field goal, 9:28. Demon Deacons 7–3. Drive: 12 plays, 53 yards, 4:50.
- WFU – Michael Campanaro 9-yard pass from Tanner Price (Chad Hedlund kick), 7:09. Demon Deacons 14–3. Drive: 7 plays, 75 yards, 2:19.
- MIA – Herb Waters 34-yard pass from Stephen Morris (Matt Goudis kick), 1:10. Demon Deacons 14–10. Drive: 4 plays, 62 yards, 1:28.

Third quarter

no scoring

Fourth quarter

- MIA – Duke Johnson 4-yard run (Matt Goudis kick), 5:36. Hurricanes 17–14. Drive: 8 plays, 51 yards, 4:05.
- WFU – Dominique Gibson 44-yard pass from Tanner Price (Chad Hedlund kick), 4:02. Demon Deacons 21–17. Drive: 6 plays, 75 yards, 1:34.
- MIA – Duke Johnson 1-yard run (Matt Goudis kick), 0:53. Hurricanes 24–21. Drive: 10 plays, 73 yards, 3:09.

Leading Passers

- WFU – T. Price 25/45 Comp/Att 302 Yds, 2 TD, 1 Int.
- MIA – P. Morris 17/28 Comp/Att 191 Yds, 1 TD

Leading Rushers

- WFU – J. Harris 10 Rushes 37 Yds. 3.7 Avg 14 Lng. 1 TD
- MIA – D. Johnson 30 Rushes 168 Yds. 5.6 Avg 23 Lng. 2 TD

Leading Receivers

- WFU – T. Harris 6 Rec. 95 Yds. 15.8 Avg 56 Lng.
- MIA – S. Coley 2 Rec. 52 Yds. 26.0 Avg 44 Lng.

Leading Tacklers

- WFU – R. Janvion 12 Tack 2 Ast
- MIA – J. Gaines 5 Tack 1 Ast

=== Syracuse ===
3rd meeting. 1–1 all time. Last meeting 2011, 36–29 Orange in Syracuse.

Week Ten: Wake Forest Demon Deacons at Syracuse Orange – Game summary

Quarter	1	2	3	4	Total
Demon Deacons	0	0	0	0	0
Orange	0	0	13	0	13

at Carrier Dome, Syracuse, New York

- Date: November 2
- Game time: 12:30 p.m. EST
- Game weather: Dome
- Game attendance: 38,550
- Referee: Walt Davenport
- TV announcers (RSN): Wes Durham, Brian Stann, and Jenn Hildreth
- Final Stats

Game information

First quarter

no scoring

Second quarter

no scoring

Third quarter

- SYR – Terrel Hunt 6-yard run (Jonathan Fisher kick), 8:58. Orange 7–0. Drive: 14 plays, 75 yards, 6:02.
- SYR – Brisly Estime 25-yard pass from Jarrod West (kick blocked), 6:06. Orange 13–0. Drive: 1 plays, 25 yards, 0:12.

Fourth quarter

no scoring

Leading Passers

- WFU – T. Price 22/54 Comp/Att 173 Yds, 1 Int.
- SYR – T. Hunt 18/30 Comp/Att 144 Yds

Leading Rushers

- WFU – J. Harris 9 Rushes 47 Yds. 5.2 Avg 14 Lng.
- SYR – P. Gulley 13 Rushes 85 Yds. 6.5 Avg 67 Lng.

Leading Receivers

- WFU – S. Ragland III 10 Rec. 91 Yds. 9.1 Avg 23 Lng.
- SYR – B. Estime 9 Rec. 62 Yds. 6.9 Avg 25 Lng. 1 TD

Leading Tacklers

- WFU – B. Chubb 8 Tack 3 Ast
- SYR – D. Eskridge 5 Tack

=== Florida State ===
32nd meeting. 6–24–1 all time. Last meeting 2012, 52–0 Seminoles in Tallahassee.

Week Eleven: Florida State Seminoles at Wake Forest Demon Deacons – Game summary

Quarter	1	2	3	4	Total
#3 Seminoles	21	21	10	7	59
Demon Deacons	0	0	0	3	3

at BB&T Field, Winston-Salem, North Carolina

- Date: November 9
- Game time: 12:00 p.m. EST
- Game weather: 52° F
- Game attendance: 30,865
- Referee: Ron Cherry
- TV announcers (ABC): Mike Patrick, Ed Cunningham, and Jeannine Edwards
- Final Stats

Game information

First quarter

- FSU – James Wilder Jr. 5-yard run (Roberto Aguayo kick), 7:15. Seminoles 7–0. Drive: 13 plays, 80 yards, 5:48.
- FSU – Devonta Freeman 1-yard run (Roberto Aguayo kick), 6:25. Seminoles 14–0. Drive: 2 plays, 2 yards, 0:41.
- FSU – Kelvin Benjamin 18-yard pass from Jameis Winston (Roberto Aguayo kick), 2:10. Seminoles 21–0. Drive: 2 plays, 15 yards, 0:47.

Second quarter

- FSU – Nate Andrews 56-yard interception return (Roberto Aguayo kick), 14:15. Seminoles 28–0..
- FSU – Jalen Ramsey 23-yard interception return (Roberto Aguayo kick), 13:56. Seminoles 35–0..
- FSU – Chad Abrams 2-yard pass from Jameis Winston (Roberto Aguayo kick), 0:11. Seminoles 42–0. Drive: 8 plays, 57 yards, 1:45.

Third quarter

- FSU – Karlos Williams 5-yard run (Roberto Aguayo kick), 12:03. Seminoles 49–0. Drive: 1 plays, 5 yards, 0:07.
- FSU – Roberto Aguayo 42-yard field goal, 8:24. Seminoles 52–0. Drive: 5 plays, 15 yards, 2:23.

Fourth quarter

- WFU – Chad Hedlund 23-yard field goal, 9:07. Seminoles 52–3. Drive: 12 plays, 48 yards, 5:00.
- FSU – Levonte Whitfield 97-yard kickoff return (Roberto Aguayo kick), 8:52. Seminoles 59–3..

Leading Passers

- FSU – J. Winston 17/28 Comp/Att 159 Yds, 2 TD, 1 Int.
- WFU – T. Cameron 5/19 Comp/Att 63 Yds, 3 Int.

Leading Rushers

- FSU – K. Williams 12 Rushes 49 Yds. 4.1 Avg 15 Lng. 1 TD
- WFU – J. Harris 15 Rushes 66 Yds. 4.4 Avg 13 Lng.

Leading Receivers

- FSU – R. Greene 5 Rec. 47 Yds. 9.4 Avg 11 Lng.
- WFU – J. Armstrong 1 Rec. 20 Yds. 20.0 Avg 20 Lng.

Leading Tacklers

- FSU – R. Northrup 3 Tack 5 Ast
- WFU – A. Wooding 3 Tack 6 Ast

=== Duke ===
94th meeting. 37–54–2 all time. Last meeting 2012, 34–27 Blue Devils in Durham.

Week Thirteen: Duke Blue Devils at Wake Forest Demon Deacons – Game summary

Quarter	1	2	3	4	Total
#24 Blue Devils	0	14	14	0	28
Demon Deacons	7	7	7	0	21

at BB&T Field, Winston-Salem, North Carolina

- Date: November 23
- Game time: 12:00 p.m. EST
- Game weather: 56° F
- Game attendance: 28,463
- Referee: Dennis Hennigan
- TV announcers (ESPN2): Beth Mowins, Joey Galloway, and Paul Carcaterra
- Final Stats

Game information

First quarter

- WFU – Thomas Brown 59-yard fumble return (Chad Hedlund kick), 5:02. Demon Deacons 7–0.

Second quarter

- WFU – Spencer Bishop 6-yard pass from Tanner Price (Chad Hedlund kick), 14:20. Demon Deacons 14–0. Drive: 10 plays, 47 yards, 4:19.
- DUKE – Jamison Crowder 10-yard pass from Anthony Boone (Ross Martin kick), 7:09. Demon Deacons 14–7. Drive: 5 plays, 43 yards, 1:53.
- DUKE – Max McCaffrey 4-yard pass from Anthony Boone (Ross Martin kick), 1:11. Tied 14–14. Drive: 10 plays, 69 yards, 4:06.

Third quarter

- WFU – Tanner Price 12-yard run (Chad Hedlund kick), 10:50. Demon Deacons 21–14. Drive: 9 plays, 75 yards, 4:10.
- DUKE – Jamison Crowder 58-yard pass from Anthony Boone (Ross Martin kick), 9:52. Tied 21–21. Drive: 3 plays, 77 yards, 0:58.
- DUKE – Brandon Connette 3-yard run (Ross Martin kick), 3:21. Blue Devils 28–21. Drive: 9 plays, 70 yards, 3:36.

Fourth quarter

no scoring

Leading Passers

- DUKE – A. Boone 24/29 Comp/Att 256 Yds, 3 TD
- WFU – T. Price 12/27 Comp/Att 124 Yds, 1 TD 1 Int.

Leading Rushers

- DUKE – A. Boone 7 Rushes 57 Yds. 8.1 Avg 20 Lng.
- WFU – J. Harris 19 Rushes 63 Yds. 3.3 Avg 11 Lng.

Leading Receivers

- DUKE – J. Crowder 10 Rec. 121 Yds. 12.1 Avg 58 Lng. 2 TD
- WFU – J. Harris 2 Rec. 35 Yds. 17.5 Avg 29 Lng.

Leading Tacklers

- DUKE – D. Helton 4 Tack 4 Ast 1 Sck
- WFU – B. Chubb 5 Tack 3 Ast

=== Vanderbilt ===
16th meeting. 6–9 all time. Last meeting 2012, 55–21 Commodores in Winston-Salem.

Week Fourteen: Duke Blue Devils at Wake Forest Demon Deacons – Game summary

Quarter	1	2	3	4	Total
Demon Deacons	7	7	7	0	21
Commodores	7	10	0	6	23

at Vanderbilt Stadium, Nashville, Tennessee

- Date: November 30
- Game time: 12:21 p.m. EST
- Game weather: 53° F
- Game attendance: 33,019
- Referee: Pat Garvey
- TV announcers (SECTV): Dave Neal, Andre Ware, and Cara Capuano
- Final Stats

Game information

First quarter

- VAN – Fitz Lassing 7-yard pass from Austyn Carta-Samuels (Carey Spear kick), 8:57. Commodores 7–0. Drive: 11 plays, 88 yards, 6:03.
- WFU – Tanner Price 3-yard run (Chad Hedlund kick), 4:24. Tied 7–7. Drive: 12 plays, 65 yards, 4:33.

Second quarter

- VAN – Patton Robinette 8-yard run (Carey Spear kick), 7:33. Commodores 14–7. Drive: 5 plays, 41 yards, 1:52.
- WFU – Dominique Gibson 9-yard run (Chad Hedlund kick), 3:09. Tied 14–14. Drive: 10 plays, 75 yards, 4:24.
- VAN – Carey Spear 41-yard field goal, 0:10. Commodores 17–14. Drive: 11 plays, 64 yards, 2:59.

Third quarter

- WFU – Justin Jackson 63-yard interception return (Chad Hedlun kick), 6:10. Demon Deacons 21–17.

Fourth quarter

- VAN – Carey Spear 25-yard field goal, 6:58. Demon Deacons 21–20. Drive: 12 plays, 70 yards, 7:02.
- VAN – Carey Spear 38-yard field goal, 0:39. Demon Deacons 21–20. Drive: 11 plays, 36 yards, 2:52.

Leading Passers

- WFU – T. Price 16/32 Comp/Att 155 Yds, 1 Int.
- VAN – A. Carta-Samuels 24/33 Comp/Att 231 Yds, 1 TD 1 Int.

Leading Rushers

- WFU – T. Price 12 Rushes 47 Yds. 3.9 Avg 16 Lng. 1 TD
- VAN – B. Kimbrow 13 Rushes 45 Yds. 3.5 Avg 16 Lng.

Leading Receivers

- WFU – J. Harris 3 Rec. 40 Yds. 13.3 Avg 22 Lng.
- VAN – J. Matthews 11 Rec. 125 Yds. 11.4 Avg 41 Lng.

Leading Tacklers

- WFU – R. Janvion 11 Tack 3 Ast
- VAN – K. Butler 5 Tack 1 Ast

== Statistics ==
=== Scores by quarter ===
	1	2	3	4	Total
Wake Forest	62	72	43	43	220
Opponents	75	99	81	34	289

=== Offense ===
==== Rushing ====
Name	GP	Att	Yards	Avg	TD	Long	Avg/G
Josh Harris	12	125	470	3.8	4	28	39.2
Tanner Price	12	123	240	2.0	5	16	20.0
Dominique Gibson	12	53	138	2.6	1	18	11.5
James Wilhite	8	22	75	3.4	1	21	9.4
John Armstrong	10	14	70	5.0	0	14	7.0
Deandre Martin	7	16	52	3.2	0	15	7.4
Orville Reynolds	9	9	36	4.0	0	9	4.0
Patrick Thompson	3	3	18	6.0	0	8	6.0
Tyler Cameron	3	9	16	1.8	0	9	5.3
Jonathan Williams	11	2	13	6.5	0	12	1.2
Michael Campanaro	8	4	10	2.5	0	4	1.2
Sherman Ragland III	8	1	5	5.0	0	5	0.6
Jalen Latter	12	1	-3	-3.0	0	-3	-0.2
TEAM	8	6	-10	-1.7	0	0	-1.2
Demon Deacons Total	12	388	1,130	2.9	11	28	94.2
Opponents	12	461	1,718	3.7	13	67	143.2

==== Passing ====
Name	GP	Cmp–Att	Pct	Yds	TD	INT	Lng	Avg/G	RAT
Tanner Price	12	206-378	54.5	2,233	13	10	66	186.1	110.18
Tyler Cameron	3	7-24	29.2	85	0	3	20	28.3	33.92
Patrick Thompson	3	4-6	66.7	12	0	1	9	4.0	50.13
Michael Campanaro	8	2-2	100.0	29	1	0	25	3.6	386.60
TEAM	8	0-2	0.0	0	0	0	0	0.0	0.00
Deandre Martin	7	0-1	0.0	0	0	0	0	0.0	000.00
Spencer Bishop	12	0-1	0.0	0	0	0	0	0.0	000.00
Demon Deacons Total	12	219-414	52.9	2,359	14	14	66	196.6	105.16
Opponents	12	262-417	62.8	2,676	20	12	75	223.0	126.81

==== Receiving ====
Name	GP	Rec	Yds	Avg	TD	Long	Avg/G
Michael Campanaro	8	67	803	12.0	6	66	100.4
Tyree Harris	8	23	225	9.8	0	56	28.1
Sherman Ragland III	8	20	154	7.7	1	23	19.2
Spencer Bishop	12	19	257	13.5	2	54	21.4
Jonathan Williams	11	17	221	13.0	0	53	20.1
Jared Crump	11	16	176	11.0	1	20	16.0
Josh Harris	12	15	117	7.8	0	31	9.8
Orville Reynolds	9	12	166	13.8	2	65	18.4
Dominique Gibson	12	8	87	10.9	1	44	7.2
John Armstrong	10	7	47	6.7	0	20	4.7
Matt James	4	4	39	9.8	0	13	9.8
Deandre Martin	7	4	8	2.0	0	10	1.1
Jordan Garside	12	3	17	5.7	0	6	1.4
James Wilhite	8	2	30	15.0	0	16	3.8
Brandon Terry	9	1	8	8.0	0	8	0.9
Tanner Price	12	1	4	4.0	1	4	0.3
Demon Deacons Total	12	219	2,359	10.8	14	66	196.6
Opponents	12	262	2,676	10.2	20	75	223.0

==== Scoring ====
Name	TD	FG	PAT	2PT PAT	SAFETY	TOT PTS
Chad Hedlund		8-12	26-26			50
Michael Campanaro	6					36
Tanner Price	6					36
Josh Harris	4					24
Spencer Bishop	2					12
Dominique Gibson	2					12
Orville Reynolds	2					12
Thomas Brown	1					6
Brandon Chubb	1					6
Jared Crump	1					6
Justin Jackson	1					6
Sherman Ragland III	1					6
James Wilhite	1					6
Jonathan Williams				1		2
Demon Deacons Total	28	8-12	26-26	1		220
Opponents	36	12-17	35-36		1	382
