= 2013 NC State Wolfpack football team =

American college football season

2013 NC State Wolfpack football
- Conference: Atlantic Coast Conference
- Atlantic Division
- Record: 3–9 (0–8 ACC)
- Head coach: Dave Doeren (1st season)
- Offensive coordinator: Matt Canada (1st season)
- Offensive scheme: Pro-style
- Defensive coordinator: Dave Huxtable (1st season)
- Base defense: 4–3
- Home stadium: Carter–Finley Stadium

2013 Atlantic Coast Conference football standings
| | Conf. | | | Overall |
| Team | W | | L | W | | L |
|---|---|---|---|---|---|---|
Atlantic Division
| No. 1 Florida State x$# | 8 | – | 0 | 14 | – | 0 |
| No. 8 Clemson % | 7 | – | 1 | 11 | – | 2 |
| Boston College | 4 | – | 4 | 7 | – | 6 |
| Syracuse | 4 | – | 4 | 7 | – | 6 |
| Maryland | 3 | – | 5 | 7 | – | 6 |
| Wake Forest | 2 | – | 6 | 4 | – | 8 |
| NC State | 0 | – | 8 | 3 | – | 9 |
Coastal Division
| No. 23 Duke x | 6 | – | 2 | 10 | – | 4 |
| Miami (FL) | 5 | – | 3 | 9 | – | 4 |
| Virginia Tech | 5 | – | 3 | 8 | – | 5 |
| Georgia Tech | 5 | – | 3 | 7 | – | 6 |
| North Carolina | 4 | – | 4 | 7 | – | 6 |
| Pittsburgh | 3 | – | 5 | 7 | – | 6 |
| Virginia | 0 | – | 8 | 2 | – | 10 |
Championship: Florida State 45, Duke 7
# – BCS National Champion; $ – BCS representative as conference champion; % – BCS at-large representative; x – Division champion/co-champions; Rankings from AP Poll

The 2013 NC State Wolfpack football team represented North Carolina State University in the Atlantic Division of the Atlantic Coast Conference during the 2013 NCAA Division I FBS football season. They played their home games at Carter–Finley Stadium in Raleigh, North Carolina. It was their first season under head coach Dave Doeren. They finished the season 3–9 overall, and 0–8 in ACC play to finish in last place in the Atlantic Division.

== Schedule ==
| Date | Time | Opponent | Site | TV | Result | Attendance |
|---|---|---|---|---|---|---|
| August 31 | 12:30 pm | Louisiana Tech* | Carter–Finley Stadium; Raleigh, NC | ACCN | W 40–14 | 54,204 |
| September 7 | 6:00 pm | No. 15 (FCS) Richmond* | Carter–Finley Stadium; Raleigh, NC | ESPN3 | W 23–21 | 50,554 |
| September 19 | 7:30 pm | No. 3 Clemson | Carter–Finley Stadium; Raleigh, NC (Textile Bowl) | ESPN | L 14–26 | 57,583 |
| September 28 | 3:30 pm | Central Michigan* | Carter–Finley Stadium; Raleigh, NC | ESPN3 | W 48–14 | 56,728 |
| October 5 | 3:30 pm | at Wake Forest | BB&T Field; Winston-Salem, NC (rivalry) | ACCRSN | L 13–28 | 30,642 |
| October 12 | 3:30 pm | Syracuse | Carter–Finley Stadium; Raleigh, NC | ACCRSN | L 10–24 | 56,639 |
| October 26 | 3:30 pm | at No. 3 Florida State | Doak Campbell Stadium; Tallahassee, FL | ABC/ESPN2 | L 17–49 | 80,389 |
| November 2 | 12:30 pm | North Carolina^{†} | Carter–Finley Stadium; Raleigh, NC (rivalry) | ACCN | L 19–27 | 57,583 |
| November 9 | 4:00 pm | at Duke | Wallace Wade Stadium; Durham, NC (rivalry) | ESPNU | L 20–38 | 32,010 |
| November 16 | 12:30 pm | at Boston College | Alumni Stadium; Chestnut Hill, MA | ACCRSN | L 21–38 | 31,262 |
| November 23 | 12:30 pm | East Carolina* | Carter–Finley Stadium; Raleigh, NC (rivalry) | ACCN | L 28–42 | 49,106 |
| November 30 | 12:30 pm | Maryland | Carter–Finley Stadium; Raleigh, NC | ACCN | L 21–41 | 43,023 |
*Non-conference game; ^{†}Homecoming; Rankings from AP Poll released prior to the game; All times are in Eastern time

== Coaching staff ==
NC State Wolfpack coaches

Head coach

- Dave Doeren

Assistant coaches

- Matt Canada – Offensive coordinator and Quarterbacks coach
- Dave Huxtable – Defensive coordinator and Linebackers coach
- Eddie Faulkner – Special teams coordinator/tight ends coach/fullbacks coach
- Richard McNutt – Cornerbacks coach
- Desmond Kitchings– Running backs coach
- Frisman Jackson – Wide receivers coach
- Ryan Nielsen – Defensive line coach/recruiting coordinator
- Mike Uremovich – Offensive line coach
- Clayton White – Safeties coach/co-special teams coordinator
- Jason veltkamp – Strength and conditioning coach

== Game summaries ==
=== Louisiana Tech ===
| | 1 | 2 | 3 | 4 | Total |
|---|---|---|---|---|---|
| Bulldogs | 0 | 7 | 0 | 7 | 14 |
| Wolfpack | 14 | 10 | 3 | 13 | 40 |

=== Richmond ===
| | 1 | 2 | 3 | 4 | Total |
|---|---|---|---|---|---|
| #15 (FCS) Spiders | 7 | 14 | 0 | 0 | 21 |
| Wolfpack | 3 | 10 | 7 | 3 | 23 |

=== Clemson ===
| | 1 | 2 | 3 | 4 | Total |
|---|---|---|---|---|---|
| #3 Tigers | 3 | 10 | 7 | 6 | 26 |
| Wolfpack | 0 | 7 | 0 | 7 | 14 |

=== Central Michigan ===
| | 1 | 2 | 3 | 4 | Total |
|---|---|---|---|---|---|
| Chippewas | 0 | 0 | 0 | 14 | 14 |
| Wolfpack | 7 | 28 | 3 | 10 | 48 |

=== @ Wake Forest ===
| | 1 | 2 | 3 | 4 | Total |
|---|---|---|---|---|---|
| Wolfpack | 0 | 10 | 3 | 0 | 13 |
| Demon Deacons | 7 | 7 | 7 | 7 | 28 |

=== Syracuse ===
| | 1 | 2 | 3 | 4 | Total |
|---|---|---|---|---|---|
| Orange | 0 | 7 | 3 | 14 | 24 |
| Wolfpack | 0 | 7 | 0 | 3 | 10 |

=== @ Florida State ===
| | 1 | 2 | 3 | 4 | Total |
|---|---|---|---|---|---|
| Wolfpack | 0 | 0 | 10 | 7 | 17 |
| #3 Seminoles | 35 | 7 | 0 | 7 | 49 |

=== North Carolina ===
| | 1 | 2 | 3 | 4 | Total |
|---|---|---|---|---|---|
| Tar Heels | 14 | 7 | 0 | 6 | 27 |
| Wolfpack | 10 | 6 | 3 | 0 | 19 |

=== @ Duke ===
| | 1 | 2 | 3 | 4 | Total |
|---|---|---|---|---|---|
| Wolfpack | 0 | 0 | 13 | 7 | 20 |
| Blue Devils | 7 | 3 | 7 | 21 | 38 |

=== @ Boston College ===
| | 1 | 2 | 3 | 4 | Total |
|---|---|---|---|---|---|
| Wolfpack | 0 | 7 | 0 | 14 | 21 |
| Eagles | 10 | 7 | 3 | 18 | 38 |

=== East Carolina ===
| | 1 | 2 | 3 | 4 | Total |
|---|---|---|---|---|---|
| Pirates | 7 | 14 | 14 | 7 | 42 |
| Wolfpack | 7 | 0 | 0 | 21 | 28 |

=== Maryland ===
| | 1 | 2 | 3 | 4 | Total |
|---|---|---|---|---|---|
| Terrapins | 17 | 17 | 7 | 0 | 41 |
| Wolfpack | 7 | 7 | 7 | 0 | 21 |
