= 2013 Virginia Cavaliers football team =

American college football season

2013 Virginia Cavaliers football
- Conference: Atlantic Coast Conference
- Coastal Division
- Record: 2–10 (0–8 ACC)
- Head coach: Mike London (4th season)
- Offensive coordinator: Steve Fairchild (1st season)
- Offensive scheme: Pro-style
- Defensive coordinator: Jon Tenuta (1st season)
- Base defense: 4–3
- Home stadium: Scott Stadium

2013 Atlantic Coast Conference football standings
	Conf.			Overall
Team	W		L	W		L
Atlantic Division
No. 1 Florida State x$#	8	–	0	14	–	0
No. 8 Clemson %	7	–	1	11	–	2
Boston College	4	–	4	7	–	6
Syracuse	4	–	4	7	–	6
Maryland	3	–	5	7	–	6
Wake Forest	2	–	6	4	–	8
NC State	0	–	8	3	–	9
Coastal Division
No. 23 Duke x	6	–	2	10	–	4
Miami (FL)	5	–	3	9	–	4
Virginia Tech	5	–	3	8	–	5
Georgia Tech	5	–	3	7	–	6
North Carolina	4	–	4	7	–	6
Pittsburgh	3	–	5	7	–	6
Virginia	0	–	8	2	–	10
Championship: Florida State 45, Duke 7
# – BCS National Champion; $ – BCS representative as conference champion; % – BCS at-large representative; x – Division champion/co-champions; Rankings from AP Poll

The 2013 Virginia Cavaliers football team represented the University of Virginia in the 2013 NCAA Division I FBS football season. The Cavaliers were led by fourth year head coach Mike London and played their home games at Scott Stadium. They were members of the Coastal Division of the Atlantic Coast Conference. They finished the season 2–10, 0–8 in ACC play to finish in last place in the Coastal Division.

== Previous season ==
The Cavaliers went 4–8 in 2012, disappointing expectations under head coach Mike London's third season. The Cavaliers followed a 2–0 start with a 2–8 finish that saw the team lose six straight before shocking NC State on the road and the Miami Hurricanes at home before closing the season, and their bowl hopes, with losses to rivals UNC and VT. The offseason saw a period of coaching upheaval and reassignment that was headlined by the arrivals of Jon Tenuta, Steve Fairchild, and the return of Tom O'Brien, among others. Bill Lazor departed back to the NFL

== Coaching staff ==
Name	Position	Seasons at Virginia	Alma mater
Mike London	Head coach	3	Richmond (1982)
Tom O'Brien	Associate head coach/Offense/Tight Ends	15	Navy (1970)
Jon Tenuta	Defensive coordinator, Linebackers	1	Virginia (1982)
Steve Fairchild	Offensive coordinator, Quarterbacks	1	Colorado State (1980)
Vincent Brown	Defensive Line	3	Mississippi Valley State (1987)
Anthony Poindexter	Safeties	8	Virginia (1999)
Larry Lewis	Running Backs, Special Teams Coordinator	1	Boise State (1980)
Marques Hagans	Wide Receivers	3	Virginia (2005)
Scott Wachenheim	Offensive Line	3	Air Force (1984)
Chip West	Cornerbacks, Recruiting Coordinator	3	Livingstone (1993)
Evan Marcus	Dir. of Football Training & Player Development	3	Ithaca College (1990)

== Schedule ==
Date	Time	Opponent	Site	TV	Result	Attendance
August 31	3:30 pm	BYU*	Scott Stadium; Charlottesville, VA	ESPNU	W 19–16	53,310
September 7	3:30 pm	No. 2 Oregon*	Scott Stadium; Charlottesville, VA	ABC/ESPN2	L 10–59	58,502
September 21	3:30 pm	VMI*	Scott Stadium; Charlottesville, VA	ESPN3	W 49–0	40,165
September 28	12:30 pm	at Pittsburgh	Heinz Field; Pittsburgh, PA	ACCRSN	L 3–14	48,425
October 5	12:00 pm	Ball State*	Scott Stadium; Charlottesville, VA	ACCRSN	L 27–48	38,228
October 12	3:30 pm	at Maryland	Byrd Stadium; College Park, MD (rivalry)	ESPNU	L 26–27	41,077
October 19	3:30 pm	Duke	Scott Stadium; Charlottesville, VA	ACCRSN	L 22–35	39,071
October 26	12:30 pm	Georgia Tech	Scott Stadium; Charlottesville, VA	ACCN	L 25–35	41,930
November 2	3:30 pm	No. 9 Clemson	Scott Stadium; Charlottesville, VA	ESPN	L 10–59	46,959
November 9	12:30 pm	at North Carolina	Kenan Memorial Stadium; Chapel Hill, NC (The South's Oldest Rivalry)	ACCN	L 14–45	50,000
November 23	12:00 pm	at Miami (FL)	Sun Life Stadium; Miami Gardens, FL	ESPNU	L 26–45	44,732
November 30	3:30 pm	Virginia Tech	Scott Stadium; Charlottesville, VA (Battle for the Commonwealth Cup)	ESPNU	L 6–16	52,069
*Non-conference game; Rankings from AP Poll released prior to the game; All times are in Eastern time

== Players ==
1 CB Demetrious Nicholson, Jr.
2 WR Dominique Terrell, Jr.
3 FB Billy Skrobacz, Sr.
4 Taquan Mizzell
5 QB David Watford, Jr.
5 CB Tim Harris, Fr.
6 Darius Jennings
7 Eli Harold DE
8 Anthony Harris
9 Pablo Alvarez
10 C.J. Moore
11 QB Greyson Lambert, Fr.
13 Daquan Romero
14 Andre Levrone
14 Ian Frye
15 Matt Johns
16 Brendan Marshall
17 Miles Gooch
18 Andrew Mackay
18 Anthony Cooper
19 E.J. Scott
20 Tim Smith
21 Brandon Phelps
22 Daniel Hamm
22 DreQuan Hoskey
23 Khalek Shepherd
25 David Marrs
25 Kevin Parks
26 Maurice Canady
26 Anthony Calloway
27 Rijo Walker
28 Wilfred Wahee
28 Willem van Reesema
29 Adam Caplinger
29 D.J. Hill
30 Alec Vozenilek P 5-10 190 JR Richmond, Va./St. Christopher's School
30 LaChaston Smith
31 Kyrrel Latimer
31 Blake Blaze
32 Mike Moore
32 James Coleman
33 Kirk Garner
34 Kwontie Moore
36 R.C. Willenbrock
36 Kye Morgan
37 Divante Walker
38 Nicholas Conte
38 Kelvin Rainey
39 Malcolm Cook
40 Darius Lee
41 Connor Wingo-Reeves
42 Demeitre Brim
43 Trent Corney
44 Henry Coley
45 Matt Fortin
45 Israel Vaughan
46 Mason Thomas
47 Vincent Croce
49 Zachary Swanson
50 Marco Jones
50 Tyler Shirley
51 Zach Bradshaw
52 Sammy MacFarlane
52 Jon Goss
53 Micah Kiser
54 Alex Foertsch
55 David Dean
56 Andre Miles-Redmond
57 Stephen Lawe
59 Mark Hall
60 John Pond
60 Jeb Byrne
61 Cody Wallace
62 Sean Karl
63 Ryan Doull
64 Nick Koutris
65 Ross Burbank
66 George Adeosun
67 Jackson Matteo
68 Eric Tetlow
69 Phillip Berry
70 Luke Bowanko
71 Jack McDonald
72 Eric Smith
74 Conner Davis
75 Sadiq Olanrewaju
76 Michael Mooney
77 Jay Whitmire
78 Morgan Moses
79 Jack Babcock
79 Sean Cascarano
80 Adrian Gamble
81 Jamall Brown
82 Mario Nixon
83 TE Jake McGee, Jr.
84 Canaan Severin
85 Keeon Johnson
86 Jeremy Dollin
87 Kyle Dockins
88 Ryan Santoro
88 Max Valles
89 Rob Burns
90 Jake Snyder
91 Jack English
91 Dylan Sims
92 Greg Gallop
93 Donte Wilkins
95 Tyrell Chavis
96 Cameron Fitch
99 Brent Urban

== Depth chart ==
Depth Chart release before October 6, 2012 Duke game.

Defense

FS
⋅
⋅
⋅

WLB	MLB	SLB
⋅	⋅	⋅
Daquan Romero	⋅	⋅
Tucker Windle	⋅	⋅

SS
⋅
⋅
⋅

CB
Demetrious Nicholson
⋅
⋅

DE	DT	DT	DE
Jake Snyder	Will Hill	⋅	Eli Harold
⋅	⋅	⋅	⋅
⋅	⋅	⋅	⋅

CB
Drequan Hoskey
Maurice Canady
⋅

Offense

WR
Darius Jennings
Dominique Terrell
⋅

LT	LG	C	RG	RT
Matt Mihalik	Conner Davis	Luke Bowanko	Sean Cascarano	Morgan Moses
⋅	Cody Wallace	Ross Burbank	Sean Karl	Jay Whitmire
⋅	⋅	⋅	⋅	⋅

TE
Paul Freedman
Colter Phillips
Jeremiah Mathis

WR
Tim Smith
E.J. Scott
⋅

QB
⋅
David Watford
⋅

RB
Kevin Parks
Clifton Richardson
Khalek Shepherd

FB
Zachary Swanson
Billy Skrobacz
LoVante' Battle

Special teams

== Game summaries ==
=== BYU ===
BYU at Virginia

Team	1	2	3	4	Total
Cougars	0	7	0	9	16
• Cavaliers	0	3	9	7	19

- Date: August 31
- Location: Scott Stadium
  Charlottesville, VA
- Game start: 3:33 p.m. EST
- Elapsed time: 3:14
- Game attendance: 53,310
- Game weather: 89 °F (32 °C), Partly Cloudy, winds S at 8mph, 2 hour 9 minute weather delay (lightning), Rain (2nd Half)
- Referee: Reggie Smith
- TV announcers (ESPNU): Anish Shroff and Kelly Stouffer

Scoring summary

Quarter	Time	Drive			Team	Scoring information	Score	
Quarter	Time	Plays	Yards	TOP	Team	Scoring information	BYU	Virginia
2	5:12	5	32	1:26	BYU	JD Falslev 4-yard touchdown reception from Taysom Hill, Justin Sorenson kick good	7	0
2	0:00	8	42	0:57	Virginia	53-yard field goal by Ian Frye	7	3
3	12:28	3	16	1:23	Virginia	Darius Jennings 11-yard touchdown reception from David Watford, Ian Frye kick good	7	10
3	2:38				Virginia	Taysom Hill fumble, recovered by Hill in end zone where he is downed for Virginia safety	7	12
4	6:26	11	92	2:17	BYU	Taysom Hill 1-yard touchdown run, 2-point pass incomplete	13	12
4	5:02	5	9	1:15	BYU	36-yard field goal by Justin Sorensen	16	12
4	2:36	1	13	0:05	Virginia	Kevin Parks 13-yard touchdown run, Ian Frye kick good	16	19
"TOP" = time of possession. For other American football terms, see Glossary of American football.							16	19
