= 2013 Duke Blue Devils football team =

American college football season

2013 Duke Blue Devils football

ACC Coastal Division champion

ACC Championship, L 7–45 vs. Florida State

Chick-fil-A Bowl, L 48–52 vs. Texas A&M
- Conference: Atlantic Coast Conference
- Coastal Division

Ranking
- Coaches: No. 22
- AP: No. 23
- Record: 10–4 (6–2 ACC)
- Head coach: David Cutcliffe (6th season)
- Offensive coordinator: Kurt Roper (6th season)
- Offensive scheme: Multiple
- Defensive coordinator: Jim Knowles (4th season)
- Base defense: 4–2–5
- MVP: Jamison Crowder
- Captains: Anthony Boone; Ross Cockrell; Justin Foxx; Dave Harding; Juwan Thompson
- Home stadium: Wallace Wade Stadium

2013 Atlantic Coast Conference football standings
	Conf.			Overall
Team	W		L	W		L
Atlantic Division
No. 1 Florida State x$#	8	–	0	14	–	0
No. 8 Clemson %	7	–	1	11	–	2
Boston College	4	–	4	7	–	6
Syracuse	4	–	4	7	–	6
Maryland	3	–	5	7	–	6
Wake Forest	2	–	6	4	–	8
NC State	0	–	8	3	–	9
Coastal Division
No. 23 Duke x	6	–	2	10	–	4
Miami (FL)	5	–	3	9	–	4
Virginia Tech	5	–	3	8	–	5
Georgia Tech	5	–	3	7	–	6
North Carolina	4	–	4	7	–	6
Pittsburgh	3	–	5	7	–	6
Virginia	0	–	8	2	–	10
Championship: Florida State 45, Duke 7
# – BCS National Champion; $ – BCS representative as conference champion; % – BCS at-large representative; x – Division champion/co-champions; Rankings from AP Poll

The 2013 Duke Blue Devils football team represented Duke University in the 2013 NCAA Division I FBS football season as a member of the Atlantic Coast Conference (ACC) in the Coastal Division.. The team was led by head coach David Cutcliffe, in his sixth year, and played its home games at Wallace Wade Stadium in Durham, North Carolina.

The 2013 season was one of the best for Duke in its 125-year history. The Blue Devils finished the regular season with a 10–2 record and the most wins in team history. They also won their first ACC Coastal Division title and a berth in the 2013 ACC Championship Game against Florida State. Duke lost to Florida State, 45–7, and earned a bid to the 2013 Chick-fil-A Bowl against Texas A&M, where they were defeated 52–48.

== Schedule ==
Date	Time	Opponent	Rank	Site	TV	Result	Attendance
August 31	4:00 pm	North Carolina Central*		Wallace Wade Stadium; Durham, NC	ESPN3	W 45–0	22,521
September 7	4:30 pm	at Memphis*		Liberty Bowl Memorial Stadium; Memphis, TN	ESPN3	W 28–14	44,237
September 14	3:30 pm	Georgia Tech		Wallace Wade Stadium; Durham, NC	ESPNU	L 14–38	21,267
September 21	12:30 pm	Pittsburgh		Wallace Wade Stadium; Durham, NC	ACCN	L 55–58	22,714
September 28	3:00 pm	Troy*^{†}		Wallace Wade Stadium; Durham, NC	ESPN3	W 38–31	30,126
October 12	12:30 pm	Navy*		Wallace Wade Stadium; Durham, NC	ACCN	W 35–7	23,749
October 19	3:30 pm	at Virginia		Scott Stadium; Charlottesville, VA	ACCRSN	W 35–22	39,071
October 26	3:30 pm	at No. 16 Virginia Tech		Lane Stadium; Blacksburg, VA	ESPNU	W 13–10	63,326
November 9	4:00 pm	NC State		Wallace Wade Stadium; Durham, NC (rivalry)	ESPNU	W 38–20	32,010
November 16	3:30 pm	No. 24 Miami (FL)		Wallace Wade Stadium; Durham, NC	ESPNU	W 48–30	30,044
November 23	12:00 pm	at Wake Forest	No. 25	BB&T Field; Winston-Salem, NC (rivalry)	ESPN2	W 28–21	28,463
November 30	12:00 pm	at North Carolina	No. 24	Kenan Memorial Stadium; Chapel Hill, NC (Victory Bell)	ESPN2	W 27–25	62,000
December 7	8:00 pm	vs. No. 1 Florida State	No. 20	Bank of America Stadium; Charlotte, NC (ACC Championship Game)	ABC	L 7–45	67,694
December 31	8:00 pm	vs. No. 20 Texas A&M*	No. 22	Georgia Dome; Atlanta, GA (Chick-fil-A Bowl)	ESPN	L 48–52	67,946
*Non-conference game; ^{†}Homecoming; Rankings from AP Poll released prior to the game; All times are in Eastern time

== Personnel ==
=== Coaching staff ===
Name	Position	Seasons at Duke	Alma mater
David Cutcliffe	Head coach	5	Alabama (1976)
Scottie Montgomery	Co-offensive Coordinator/Assistant head coach/Wide receivers	0	Duke (1999)
Kurt Roper	Co-offensive coordinator/Associate head coach/quarterbacks	5	Rice (1995)
John Latina	Offensive line/Assistant head coach/Running game coordinator	0	Virginia Tech (1981)
Re'quan Boyette	Running backs	1	Duke (2009)
Marcus Johnson	Offensive quality control	2	Ole Miss (2004)
Jim Knowles	Defensive coordinator	3	Cornell (1987)
Jim Collins	Assistant Defensive coordinator/linebackers	5	Elon (1974)
Rick Petri	Defensive line	2	Missouri–Rolla (1976)
Patrick O'Connor	Defensive quality control	1	Dickinson College (2010)
Zac Roper	Special teams coordinator/Tight ends/recruiting coordinator	5	Ole Miss (2001)
Derek Jones	Assistant special teams coordinator/Defensive backs	2	Ole Miss (1996)
Matt Guerrieri	Defensive Graduate Assistant/Safeties	1	Davidson College (2011)
Clayton McGrath	Defensive Graduate Assistant	0	Brown University (2012)
Jeff Faris	Offensive Graduate Assistant	1	Duke University (2012)
Matthew Symmes	Offensive Graduate Assistant/special teams Quality Control	0	Duke University (2013)
Josh Grizzard	Offensive Football Operations Assistant	0	Yale University (2012)
Jackson Korman	Safeties Manager	0	Germantown Academy (2013)

== Game summaries ==
=== North Carolina Central ===
	1	2	3	4	Total
Eagles	0	0	0	0	0
Blue Devils	14	14	14	3	45

=== At Memphis ===
	1	2	3	4	Total
Blue Devils	7	0	7	14	28
Tigers	0	7	0	7	14

=== Georgia Tech ===
	1	2	3	4	Total
Yellow Jackets	10	14	7	7	38
Blue Devils	7	0	0	7	14

=== Pittsburgh ===
	1	2	3	4	Total
Panthers	20	17	14	7	58
Blue Devils	7	21	7	20	55

=== Troy ===
	1	2	3	4	Total
Trojans	7	14	7	3	31
Blue Devils	14	14	7	3	38

=== Navy ===
	1	2	3	4	Total
Midshipmen	0	7	0	0	7
Blue Devils	0	14	14	7	35

=== At Virginia ===
	1	2	3	4	Total
Blue Devils	0	7	10	18	35
Cavaliers	14	8	0	0	22

=== At No. 16 Virginia Tech ===
	1	2	3	4	Total
Blue Devils	0	6	7	0	13
No. 16 Hokies	0	0	7	3	10

=== NC State ===
	1	2	3	4	Total
Wolfpack	0	0	13	7	20
Blue Devils	7	3	7	21	38

=== No. 24 Miami (FL) ===
	1	2	3	4	Total
No. 24 Hurricanes	17	3	10	0	30
Blue Devils	7	14	10	17	48

=== At Wake Forest ===
	1	2	3	4	Total
No. 25 Blue Devils	0	14	14	0	28
Demon Deacons	7	7	7	0	21

=== At North Carolina ===
	1	2	3	4	Total
No. 24 Blue Devils	7	10	7	3	27
Tar Heels	7	8	7	3	25

=== Vs. No. 1 Florida State (2013 ACC Championship Game) ===
	1	2	3	4	Total
No. 20 Blue Devils	0	0	0	7	7
No. 1 Seminoles	0	17	21	7	45

=== Vs. No. 20 Texas A&M (Chick-fil-A Bowl) ===
	1	2	3	4	Total
No. 22 Blue Devils	14	24	3	7	48
No. 20 Aggies	3	14	14	21	52

== Rankings ==
Ranking movements Legend: ██ Increase in ranking ██ Decrease in ranking — = Not ranked RV = Received votes
	Week																
Poll	Pre	1	2	3	4	5	6	7	8	9	10	11	12	13	14	15	Final
AP	—	—	—	—	—	—	—	—	—	RV	RV	RV	25	24	20	22	23
Coaches	—	—	—	—	—	—	—	—	—	RV	RV	RV	24	24	20	21	22
Harris	Not released							—	—	RV	RV	RV	24	24	20	24	Not released
BCS	Not released								—	—	—	—	—	24	20	24	Not released
