= 2013 Boston College Eagles football team =

American college football season

2013 Boston College Eagles football
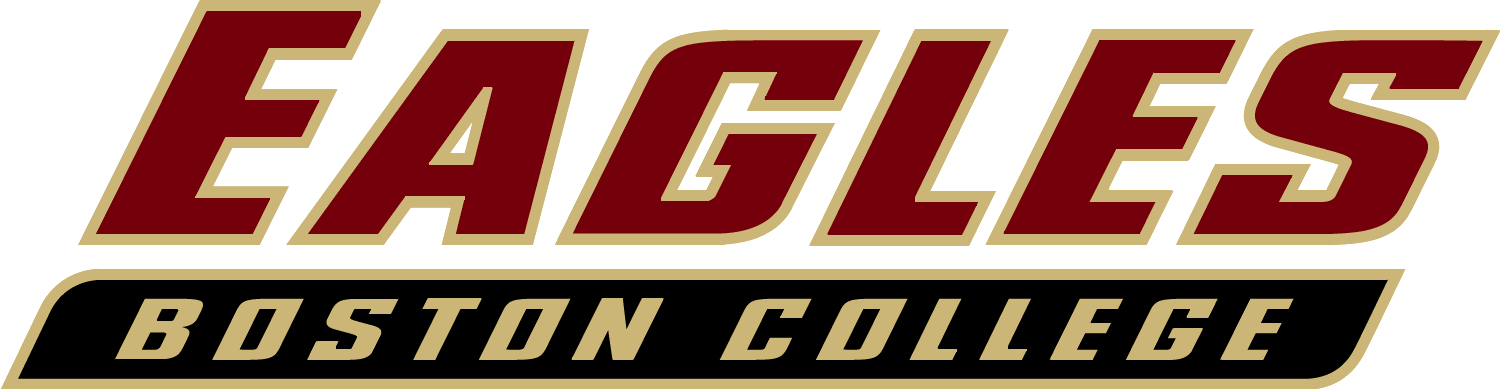

AdvoCare V100 Bowl, L 19–42 vs. Arizona
- Conference: Atlantic Coast Conference
- Atlantic Division
- Record: 7–6 (4–4 ACC)
- Head coach: Steve Addazio (1st season)
- Offensive coordinator: Ryan Day (1st season)
- Offensive scheme: Spread
- Defensive coordinator: Don Brown (1st season)
- Base defense: 4–3
- Captains: Ian White; Kasim Edebali
- Home stadium: Alumni Stadium

2013 Atlantic Coast Conference football standings
	Conf.			Overall
Team	W		L	W		L
Atlantic Division
No. 1 Florida State x$#	8	–	0	14	–	0
No. 8 Clemson %	7	–	1	11	–	2
Boston College	4	–	4	7	–	6
Syracuse	4	–	4	7	–	6
Maryland	3	–	5	7	–	6
Wake Forest	2	–	6	4	–	8
NC State	0	–	8	3	–	9
Coastal Division
No. 23 Duke x	6	–	2	10	–	4
Miami (FL)	5	–	3	9	–	4
Virginia Tech	5	–	3	8	–	5
Georgia Tech	5	–	3	7	–	6
North Carolina	4	–	4	7	–	6
Pittsburgh	3	–	5	7	–	6
Virginia	0	–	8	2	–	10
Championship: Florida State 45, Duke 7
# – BCS National Champion; $ – BCS representative as conference champion; % – BCS at-large representative; x – Division champion/co-champions; Rankings from AP Poll

The 2013 Boston College Eagles football team represented Boston College as a member of the Atlantic Division of the Atlantic Coast Conference (ACC) in the 2013 NCAA Division I FBS football season. They were led by first-year head coach Steve Addazio and played their home games at Alumni Stadium. They finished the season 7–6 overall and 4–4 in ACC play to tie for third place in the Atlantic Division. They were invited to the AdvoCare V100 Bowl, where they were defeated by Arizona, 42–19.

== Schedule ==
Date	Time	Opponent	Site	TV	Result	Attendance	Source
August 31	12:00 p.m.	No. 5 (FCS) Villanova*	Alumni Stadium; Chestnut Hill, MA	ESPNews	W 24–14	30,922	
September 6	8:00 p.m.	Wake Forest	Alumni Stadium; Chestnut Hill, MA	ESPN2	W 24–10	32,465	
September 14	3:00 p.m.	at USC*	Los Angeles Memorial Coliseum; Los Angeles, CA	P12N	L 7–35	62,006	
September 28	3:30 p.m.	No. 8 Florida State	Alumni Stadium; Chestnut Hill, MA	ABC/ESPN2	L 34–48	40,129	
October 5	1:00 p.m.	Army*^{†}	Alumni Stadium; Chestnut Hill, MA	ESPN3	W 48–27	33,128	
October 12	3:30 p.m.	at No. 3 Clemson	Memorial Stadium; Clemson, SC (Battle for the O'Rourke–McFadden Trophy)	ABC/ESPN2	L 14–24	77,506	
October 26	3:30 p.m.	at North Carolina	Kenan Memorial Stadium; Chapel Hill, NC	ACCRSN	L 10–34	43,000	
November 2	12:00 p.m.	Virginia Tech	Alumni Stadium; Chestnut Hill, MA (rivalry)	ABC/ESPN2	W 34–27	30,129	
November 9	3:30 p.m.	at New Mexico State*	Aggie Memorial Stadium; Las Cruces, NM	ESPN3	W 48–34	14,997	
November 16	12:30 p.m.	NC State	Alumni Stadium; Chestnut Hill, MA	ACCRSN	W 38–21	31,262	
November 23	3:30 p.m.	at Maryland	Byrd Stadium; College Park, MD	ACCRSN	W 29–26	32,147	
November 30	3:30 p.m.	at Syracuse	Carrier Dome; Syracuse, NY	ACCRSN	L 31–34	37,406	
December 31	12:30 p.m.	vs. Arizona*	Independence Stadium; Shreveport, LA (AdvoCare V100 Bowl)	ESPN	L 19–42	36,917	
*Non-conference game; ^{†}Homecoming; Rankings from AP Poll released prior to the game; All times are in Eastern time

== Game summaries ==
=== Villanova ===
	1	2	3	4	Total
# 5 (FCS) Wildcats	14	0	0	0	14
Eagles	7	0	14	3	24

In Steve Addazio's first game as head coach and season opener for the Eagles, Boston College took on their historical foe, the Villanova Wildcats for the first time since 1980. Ranked #5 in the FCS polls, Villanova had a strong potential to upset an FBS team coming off a trying 2–10 year. The upset looked imminent as the Wildcats led 14–7 at halftime, the first score of which came on a spectacular 4th down fake punt on the first drive of the game. However, the Eagles came out of the half energized and turned the game around to win 24–14.

=== Wake Forest ===
	1	2	3	4	Total
Demon Deacons	7	0	0	3	10
Eagles	10	7	7	0	24

In the ACC opener for both teams, the Eagles took on the Demon Deacons on ESPN2 College Football Friday Primetime. BC's defense stifled the Deacons' option attack all game, while churning out scores on a 204-yard performance by senior running back Andre Williams, as the Eagles went 2–0 for the first time since 2010, and matched their win total from the previous year.

=== @ USC ===
	1	2	3	4	Total
Eagles	0	0	0	7	7
Trojans	7	7	7	14	35

The Eagles first loss of the season came at USC, as the Trojans dominated both sides of the ball in only the teams' fourth ever meeting. USC is 4–0 in games against Boston College. Coming into the game, BC had the potential to upset USC, who was coming off a 10–7 loss at Washington State, along with quarterback drama and dysfunctional leadership under head coach Lane Kiffin (who was fired later in the month). However, the hostile environment proved too much for Boston College and could not come up with an upset, let alone a fighting chance at winning the game, as they lost 35–7.

=== Florida State ===
	1	2	3	4	Total
#8 Seminoles	3	21	14	10	48
Eagles	14	3	10	7	34

Florida State visited the Heights ranked eighth in the country, but Boston College was determined to prove they were a different team than last year's 2–10 squad. The Eagles came out hot, taking a 17–3 lead before FSU mounted a late first half-comeback. The Seminoles finished the half with a crowd-stunning last second Hail Mary pass to take a 24–17 lead into the locker room. The second half was a back and forth affair, with the Eagles' offense desperately trying to catch up in vain, as ultimately FSU's offense proved mightier, and the Seminoles escaped Chestnut Hill with a 48–34 victory. This victory proved pivotal for FSU, as they finished the season undefeated and ranked #1 in the national polls, and will be playing in the BCS National Championship Game. In fact, FSU's game against Boston College was the last time in the 2013 season they trailed the other team during a game, and the last time they won a game with less than a 15-point victory margin.

=== Army ===
	1	2	3	4	Total
Black Knights	10	10	7	0	27
Eagles	14	17	7	10	48

The Eagles bounced back from consecutive losses to strong teams with a solid 48–27 win over Army. Boston College did not take the Black Knights lightly, however, as they took revenge for a 34–31 comeback win by Army in the previous year at West Point. Running back Andre Williams ran for 263 yards and 5 touchdowns, 1 yard short of the school's single-game record, and tied the record for most rushing scores in a game.

=== @ Clemson ===
	1	2	3	4	Total
Eagles	0	7	7	0	14
#3 Tigers	0	3	7	14	24

In another meeting against a top-10 conference foe, Boston College took the trip to Death Valley to take on the rival #3 Tigers. The Eagles were energized and effective, forcing turnovers and holding Clemson to only a field goal in the first half, and then took a 14–10 into the fourth quarter. However, even with the huge road upset within grasp, BC's defense could not hold off the Tigers, and lost the game 24–14.

=== @ North Carolina ===
	1	2	3	4	Total
Eagles	7	0	0	3	10
Tar Heels	6	14	7	7	34

After nearly upsetting the #3 Tigers, Boston College took the trip to Chapel Hill with hopes off "going 1–0" to start the second half of the season, against an uncharacteristically underachieving 1–5 UNC team. However, the Tar Heels had different hopes, as they were in danger of becoming bowl-ineligible. The Eagles played poorly as they lost their 9th consecutive road game, 34–10. The win for the Tar Heels started a 6-game winning streak to turn around their 1–5 season into a 6–6 bowl eligible one.

=== Virginia Tech ===
	1	2	3	4	Total
Hokies	0	10	7	10	27
Eagles	7	0	10	17	34

After nearly upsetting two top-10 teams earlier in the season, the Eagles finally managed an upset against the Hokies in a 34–27 victory at home. The Eagles defense managed four turnovers against the 6–2 Virginia Tech team, who were coming off a 13–10 home loss against Duke. The win was only Boston College's 7th all time in 22 meetings against the Hokies and stopped a 5-game winning streak, which included two ACC-Championship games. The win also got the Eagles back to a .500 record and doubled their win total from the previous season, while giving them an opportunity to become bowl eligible for the first time since 2010.

=== @ New Mexico State ===
	1	2	3	4	Total
Eagles	13	7	7	21	48
Aggies	3	14	7	10	34

In the team's first-ever meeting, the Eagles and Aggies had a surprisingly closer game than anticipated. New Mexico State, one of the worst-ranked teams in all of the FBS and holding the dead-last rushing defense in the league, was going up against a revived and energized Eagles team coming off an upset victory against Virginia Tech and having the nation's second-leading rusher in Andre Williams. The game was supposed to be a pushover for the Eagles, but NMSU proved otherwise. Aggies Head coach Doug Martin was the Eagles' offensive coordinator in 2012, and used his knowledge of BC's personnel effectively. The game was a back-and-forth affair, with both defenses struggling to keep their opposing offense from making big plays and scoring. However, as the game wore on and the depth of the teams became prominent, BC pulled away in the 4th off of two huge Andre Williams rushes for touchdowns, one 80-yard run, his season high, and another 47-yard to pull two scores away. Despite the closeness of the game, both teams put up huge numbers offensively. Andre Williams set a new single-game school record with 295 yards rushing and 2 touchdowns, after nearly breaking the record earlier in the year against Army. Chase Rettig threw for 230 yards and 3 touchdowns. Alex Amidon, who also set a new school record for career yards received, caught 88 yards and 1 touchdown. True freshman Myles Willis returned a 98-yard kickoff for a touchdown in the 4th quarter. On the Aggies side, quarterback Andrew McDonald threw 384 yards with 3 touchdowns and 1 interception, while wide receiver Austin Franklin caught 145 yards and 2 touchdowns. The win ended a 9-game losing streak on the road for the Eagles, their first road win since 2010, while handing the Aggies their 9th loss of their season. BC looks to win their third straight next week against struggling North Carolina State at home, and become bowl eligible for the first time since 2010.

=== NC State ===
	1	2	3	4	Total
Wolfpack	0	7	0	14	21
Eagles	10	7	3	18	38

On senior day, BC's final home game of the season, the Eagles beat NC State 38–21 and became bowl-eligible for the first time since 2010 due to a record-setting performance by the nation's leading rusher and Doak Walker candidate Andre Williams. After breaking the single-game rushing record the previous week at New Mexico State, Williams broke his own record by rushing for 339 yards on 42 carries, scoring 2 touchdowns. The single-game performance is also the ACC's single-game rushing record, breaking John Leach of Wake Forest's record of 329 yards in 1993. 339 yards was also the highest single-game performance by any FBS running back during the season. Williams also surpassed Mike Cloud's single-season BC record of 1,726 yards and put himself 385 yards shorts of BC's career rushing record owned by Montel Harris' 3,757 yards. Kicker Nate Freese also set a record, becoming the school's all-time leading scorer, with 299 points. The win tripled the previous season's win total and guaranteed at least a .500 record for the first time since 2010. After the game ended, the students and alumni rushed the field to celebrate with the team. The Boston Red Sox's 2013 World Series trophy was on display during the game as it toured various professional and collegiate teams in the Boston area.

=== @ Maryland ===
	1	2	3	4	Total
Eagles	3	7	3	16	29
Terrapins	10	0	7	9	26

The Eagles won their fourth consecutive victory and second road victory of the season the week after both BC and Maryland became bowl-eligible. It was an exciting back and forth affair, as Heisman candidate Andre Williams and the Eagles battled back every time the Terrapins pulled away. After Maryland took a 24–13 lead in the 4th quarter, Andre Williams ran for a 72-yard touchdown on the first play of the following drive to pull within 4. On the play, he passed 2,000 yards rushing for the season, becoming only the 16th player in NCAA history to pass the 2,000 mark, finishing the game 12th on the list for most rushing yards in a season. The Eagles' next drive resulted in Rettig throwing a 74-yard play action touchdown pass to Alex Amidon to take the 26–24 lead. However, on the PAT attempt, Nate Freese's kick was blocked and was recovered by Maryland while the ball was still live, and returned for a 2-point conversion to tie the game at 26. The blocked extra point was the first missed PAT or Field Goal of the season for Freese. With around 5:00 minutes remaining, Maryland attempted to drive down the field and take the lead back but was stopped and forced to punt, giving BC the ball at their 20 and a chance to win with less than 1:30 to play. A 36-yard run by Andre Williams put the Eagles within field goal range as head coach Steve Addazio elected to run the clock down and take a chance with Freese for the game winner. From 52 yards away, Freese lined up to kick and win the game, but missed wide left. However, Maryland head coach Randy Edsall called a timeout before the kick to ice Freese, which none of the players heard. Freese was granted another chance, and didn't miss again. BC won the game 29–26. This was the final meeting between the teams in ACC conference play, as Maryland leaves for the Big Ten conference next season. Andre Williams continued his torrid pace, rushing for 263 yards and two scores, maintaining his NCAA lead in rushing yards and yards per game, all while continuing to gain support for Heisman candidacy.

=== @ Syracuse ===
	1	2	3	4	Total
Eagles	7	7	7	10	31
Orange	0	21	3	10	34

In their final regular season game of the 2013 season, the Eagles fell in a closely fought battle with former Big East rival Syracuse. The Eagles took a 7–0 lead in the 1st on a 24-yard touchdown run by Heisman candidate Andre Williams, but let up 21 straight points in the 2nd quarter before answering with a touchdown in the final minute before going to the locker room. The Eagles got the ball to start the 2nd half but Williams left early in the opening drive with an injury to his right shoulder and did not return to the game. True Freshman Myles Willis took over Williams' place and helped BC fight back and take a 28–24 lead in the 4th. Syracuse managed to kick a field goal to pull within a point but threw an interception on their next drive. The Eagles could only manage a field goal to push their lead back to four and gave Syracuse the ball with 2:08 with no timeouts. The Orange drove 75 yards down the field in 2:01 and scored a touchdown with 0:06 left on the clock to seal the game, winning their 6th of the season and becoming the 11th bowl-eligible team in the ACC. Williams' injury and the loss effectively ended his chances at winning the Heisman trophy, but he was nonetheless named one of six finalists and finished 4th in the voting. For his performance, Williams was awarded the 2013 Doak Walker Award and was named a unanimous All-American. The Eagles finished the regular season at 7–5 and 4–4 in ACC play, a remarkable turnaround from the 2–10 performance in 2012. The Eagles will play in their 23rd bowl game on December 31, 2013, in the 2013 AdvoCare V100 Independence Bowl against the Arizona Wildcats.

=== Arizona ===
	1	2	3	4	Total
Wildcats	7	14	14	7	42
Eagles	3	3	0	13	19

The Eagles final game of the season came against the Arizona Wildcats in the 2013 AdvoCare V100 Independence Bowl in Shreveport, LA. The game started close, as both teams traded turnovers on their opening drives. The score was 7–6 before Arizona scored 35 unanswered points as the BC defense could not prevent Ka'Deem Carey and the Arizona offense from scoring while the Eagles struggled to gain any offense of their own. Andre Williams was kept in check with only 75 yards and 1 touchdown rushing on the day, but he finished the season with 2,177 yards, good for 5th most all-time in the NCAA. The Eagles finished the season 7–6 (4–4 ACC), poised to continue their improvement next season with a ripe group of incoming freshman and the leadership of Coach Steve Addazio.

== Personnel ==
=== Coaching staff ===
Name	Position	Seasons at Boston College	Alma mater
Steve Addazio	Head Coach	1	Central Connecticut State (1982)
Ryan Day	Offensive Coordinator/quarterbacks	7	New Hampshire (2002)
Todd Fitch	Wide Receivers/passing game coordinator	1	Ohio Wesleyan (1986)
Justin Frye	Offensive Line	1	Indiana (2006)
Frank Leonard	Offensive Line	1	Central Connecticut State (1981)
Al Washington	Running backs	1	Boston College (2006)
Don Brown	Defensive coordinator/linebackers	0	Norwich (1977)
Ben Albert	Defensive line	0	UMass (1995)
Kevin Lempa	Defensive Backs	14	Southern Connecticut State (1974)
Sean McGowan	Special Teams Coordinator	0	Fordham (1998)

== 2014 NFL draft ==
2014	4	13	113	Andre Williams	New York Giants	RB
2014	4	32	132	Kevin Pierre-Louis	Seattle Seahawks	LB
2014	7	14	229	Nate Freese	Detroit Lions	K
2014	7	28	243	Kaleb Ramsey	San Francisco 49ers	DE
