= Jabari Price =

American football player (born 1992)

No. 39
- Position: Cornerback

Personal information
- Born: August 31, 1992 (age 34); Pompano Beach, Florida, U.S.
- Listed height: 6 ft 0 in (1.83 m)
- Listed weight: 200 lb (91 kg)

Career information
- High school: Blanche Ely (Pompano Beach)
- College: North Carolina
- NFL draft: 2014: 7th round, 225th overall pick

Career history
- Minnesota Vikings (2014–2016)

Awards and highlights
- First-team All-ACC (2013)

Career NFL statistics
- Total tackles: 10
- Stats at Pro Football Reference

Jabari Price (born August 31, 1992) is an American former professional football player who was a cornerback in the National Football League (NFL). He played college football for the North Carolina Tar Heels. He was selected by the Minnesota Vikings in the seventh round of the 2014 NFL draft.

== Early life and high school career ==
Price was born on August 31, 1992 in Pompano Beach, Florida, to Lalanda Price Sr. and Portia Williams. His grandmother, Ernestine Price, was a community leader and civil rights activist. Price grew up playing pee-wee football against fellow South Florida native Teddy Bridgewater.

Price attended Blanche Ely High School in Pompano Beach, Florida, where he played as a cornerback and free safety on the football team. He was teammates with Patrick Peterson. As a junior in 2008, Price tallied 39 tackles, 10 pass break-ups (PBU), one interception, and one forced fumble. As a senior, despite opponents throwing his way only 23 times, Price recorded five interceptions and 12 pass break-ups, to go along with 39 tackles and five forced fumbles. He helped lead Ely to an 11–2 record and the state 5A regionals, where they were defeated by nationally ranked St. Thomas Aquinas. Price was named first-team all-county and third-team Class 5A all-state by the Sun Sentinel. He also earned an invitation to play in the annual Dade vs. Broward County high school all-star game.

Price also competed as a sprinter on Blanche Ely's track and field team. In 2008, he took eighth in the 200 meters (23.42s) and eighth in the 400-meter dash (52.95s) at the BCAA North Meet. At the FHSAA 4A District Meet, Price ran a personal-best time of 11.32 seconds in the 100-meter dash and ran the third leg on the 4 × 100 m relay squad, helping them win the event with a time of 41.48 seconds. He also posted a career-best time of 21.42 seconds in the 200-meter dash at the Charles Johnson Invitational as a senior. The Blanche Ely relay squad was named to the Miami Herald all-county first-team.

Price was named an All-American Scholar by the United States Achievement Academy after compiling a 4.0 grade point average.

=== Recruiting ===
Price was a consensus three-star recruit and was rated the no. 83 cornerback in the country by Rivals. He received 10 NCAA Division I scholarship offers, including letters from Minnesota and Rutgers. Price originally gave an oral commitment to Minnesota but ultimately decided to play for the North Carolina Tar Heels in order to be closer to home.

College recruiting
Name	Hometown	School	Height	Weight	40^{‡}	Commit date
Jabari Price; CB	Pompano Beach, Florida	Blanche Ely High School	5 ft 11 in (1.80 m)	171 lb (78 kg)	N/A	Nov 3, 2009
Jabari Price; CB	Recruit ratings: Scout: Rivals: (75)					
Overall recruit ranking: Scout: 115 (CB) Rivals: 83 (CB)
‡ Refers to 40-yard dash; Note: In many cases, Scout, Rivals, 247Sports, On3, and ESPN may conflict in their listings of height, weight and 40 time.; In these cases, the average was taken. ESPN grades are on a 100-point scale.; Sources: "2010 North Carolina College Football Recruiting Commits". Scout.; "Scout.com Team Recruiting Rankings". Scout.

== College career ==
As a true freshman at North Carolina, Price played in all 13 games at cornerback, starting the final four. He recorded 20 tackles, four pass break-ups and one interception on the year. Ahead of his sophomore season in 2011, Price injured a tendon in his left hand during a blocking drill in practice, requiring surgery. After missing the first four games of the season, he returned in a reserve role against East Carolina, posting five tackles and a pass break-up. Price was placed back in the starting lineup at cornerback ahead of their following game against Louisville, shifting teammate Tre Boston to the safety position. He made one other start against Miami and finished the season with 16 tackles, two pass break-ups and a tackle for loss. Price had a breakout season as a junior. In 11 games, he tallied 76 tackles (ranking third on the team), nine pass break-ups (first on the team), four tackles for loss, one sack, one forced fumble, and one interception.

As a senior, Price posted 74 tackles, 4.5 tackles for loss, nine pass break-ups and a forced fumble while starting all 12 games, earning All-Atlantic Coast Conference honorable mention accolades.

== Professional career ==
Pre-draft measurables
Height	Weight	Arm length	Hand span	40-yard dash	10-yard split	20-yard split	20-yard shuttle	Three-cone drill	Vertical jump	Broad jump	Bench press
5 ft 11 in (1.80 m)	200 lb (91 kg)	31 5/8 in (0.80 m)	9 1/8 in (0.23 m)	4.45 s	1.55 s	2.60 s	4.30 s	7.04 s	29.5 in (0.75 m)	9 ft 4 in (2.84 m)	16 reps
All values from the NFL Combine and Pro Day

After being projected as a fifth-seventh round pick, Price was selected by the Minnesota Vikings in the seventh round (225th overall) of the 2014 NFL draft. On May 16, 2014, the Vikings signed Price and Kendall James (sixth round) to rookie contracts. He agreed to a four-year/$2.28 million contract. Price appeared in 14 games as a rookie, recording 10 combined tackles while mostly playing special teams.

Price was suspended for the first two games of the 2015 season for violating the league's substance abuse policy. On September 3, 2016, he was placed on injured reserve. On September 2, 2017, Price was released by the Vikings.

== Personal life ==
In preparation for the 2014 NFL draft, Price was mentored by fellow Pompano Beach native Tyrone Carter.

On December 29, 2014, Price was arrested in Hennepin County, Minnesota, and charged with a misdemeanor DWI. He was released on bail shortly thereafter. Price pled guilty to a reduced charge of careless driving on April 10, 2015, and was sentenced to a $300 fine and 30 days of electronic home monitoring.
