= Dorial Green-Beckham =

American football player (born 1993)

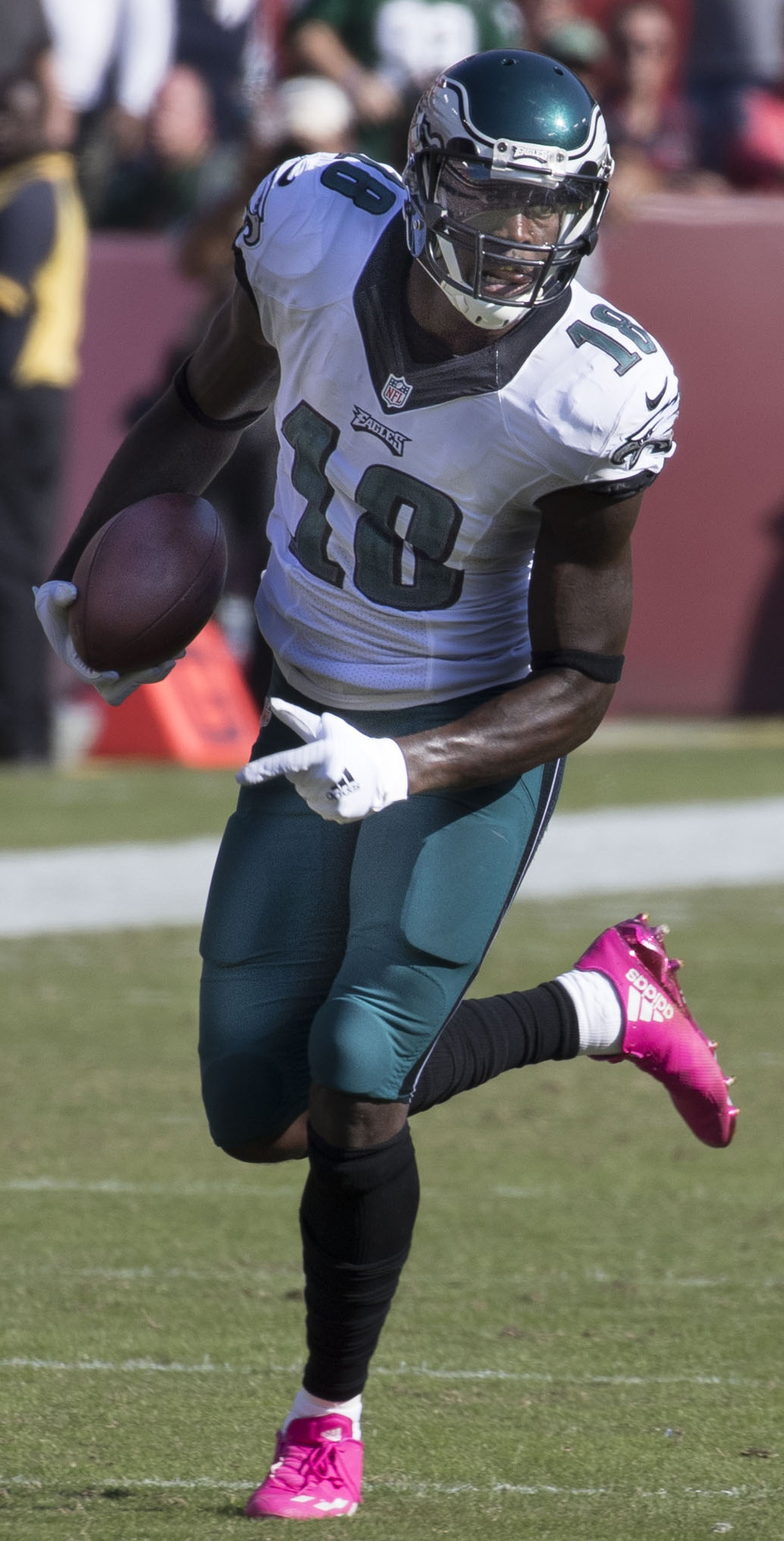
- Green-Beckham with the Philadelphia Eagles in 2016

No. 17, 18
- Position: Wide receiver

Personal information
- Born: April 12, 1993 (age 33); St. Louis, Missouri, U.S.
- Listed height: 6 ft 5 in (1.96 m)
- Listed weight: 237 lb (108 kg)

Career information
- High school: Hillcrest (Springfield, Missouri)
- College: Missouri (2012–2013); Oklahoma (2014)
- NFL draft: 2015: 2nd round, 40th overall pick

Career history
- Tennessee Titans (2015); Philadelphia Eagles (2016)

Awards and highlights
- Second-team All-SEC (2013)

Career NFL statistics
- Receptions: 68
- Receiving yards: 941
- Receiving touchdowns: 6
- Stats at Pro Football Reference

Dorial Isaiah Green-Beckham (born April 12, 1993) is an American former professional football player who was a wide receiver in the National Football League (NFL). He was selected by the Tennessee Titans in the second round of the 2015 NFL draft and played college football for the Missouri Tigers until he was dismissed from the team in 2014.

A two-time USA Today High School All-American (2010 and 2011) at Hillcrest High School in Springfield, Missouri, Green-Beckham was the first wide receiver to be named USA Today Offensive Player of the Year since Andre Hastings in 1989. He was also the first wide receiver to ever win the Hall Trophy, awarded to the nation's best high school player.

== Early life ==
Dorial Isaiah Green-Beckham was born on April 12, 1993. A native of Springfield, Missouri, he attended Hillcrest High School, where he was a three-sport star in football, basketball, and track. In 2008, his freshman year, Green-Beckham caught 37 passes for 801 yards and 13 touchdowns. As a sophomore, he posted 66 catches for 1,616 yards and 23 touchdowns. As a junior in 2010, Green-Beckham was the Rivals High School Football Junior of the Year after he had 78 receptions for 1,706 yards with 15 touchdowns. As a senior, Green-Beckham had 119 receptions for 2,233 yards with 24 touchdowns. In October, he became the nation's all-time high school receiving yards leader, a record broken on November 16, 2013, by Trey Quinn, a Lake Charles, Louisiana, receiver from Barbe High School. For his play he was named the Sporting News High School Athlete of the Year. He played in the 2012 U.S. Army All-American Bowl.

In addition to football, Green-Beckham was a talented track & field athlete. He was named the 2009–10 Gatorade Missouri Boys Track & Field Athlete of the Year. As a sophomore in 2010, Green-Beckham captured the Missouri Class 4 State Track titles in the 100 meters and triple jump, and also took second in the long jump. He ran a career-best time of 10.59 seconds in the 100-meter dash at the 2010 Class 4 Sectional 3. He also had personal-bests of 7.11 m (23 ft 4 in) in the long jump and 14.45 m (47 ft 5 in) in the triple jump.

One of the most highly regarded football recruits of the class of 2012, Green-Beckham was listed as the number one overall prospect in the nation by Rivals.com. He was considered the third best by Scout.com, ESPN, and Sporting News. In January 2012, he narrowed his college decision to Alabama, Arkansas, Missouri, Oklahoma and Texas, and he stated that he would make his decision on National Signing Day (February 1, 2012). In a nationally televised ceremony, Green-Beckham announced he would sign a national letter of intent to attend the University of Missouri. Said Green-Beckham of his decision, "just to stay home and have all those guys [family, friends] come out and see me [was big]". He picked Missouri over Southeastern Conference (SEC)-rival Arkansas, also because offensive coordinator Garrick McGee, who had formed a strong relationship with Green-Beckham and his family, left the school in December 2011.

College recruiting
Name	Hometown	School	Height	Weight	40^{‡}	Commit date
Dorial Green-Beckham; WR	Springfield, MO	Hillcrest	6 ft 6 in (1.98 m)	220 lb (100 kg)	4.43	Feb 1, 2012
Dorial Green-Beckham; WR	Recruit ratings: Scout: Rivals: 247Sports: ESPN:					

== College career ==
=== Missouri ===
Receiving playing time as a true freshman, Green-Beckham played the "X" receiver position in Missouri's offense, the same one prolific pass-catchers like Michael Egnew and Danario Alexander had thrived in during previous seasons. He appeared in the first five games of the season, registering five catches for 125 yards, including an 80-yard touchdown reception against Central Florida. Then came an arrest and suspension due to drug possession, causing Green-Beckham to miss the Vanderbilt and Alabama game on October 6 and 13, respectively.

Green-Beckham returned for the second half of the season on October 27 against Kentucky, catching a season-high seven throws for 25 yards. In a 14–7 loss at Florida, he totalled six catches for 75 yards. Then, in a four-overtime 51–48 win over Tennessee, Green-Beckham had two catches, both for touchdowns, and for 35 yards. In the final minute of regulation, he caught a game-tying touchdown in the left corner of the end zone. Against Syracuse and Texas A&M, he added two and four catches, for 79 and 55 yards, respectively. For his freshman season, he had 28 receptions for 395 yards and a team-best five receiving touchdowns, which earned him honorable mention freshman All-American honors by College Football News.

In his sophomore season, Green-Beckham had 59 receptions with a 15-yard average and 12 touchdowns. In the SEC championship game against Auburn, he caught six passes for 144 yards and two scores. His 27-yard catch set up Henry Josey's go-ahead score in the Cotton Bowl victory over Oklahoma State. On April 11, 2014, Green-Beckham was dismissed from Missouri due to legal troubles.

=== Oklahoma ===
After his dismissal from Missouri, Green-Beckham transferred to the University of Oklahoma. As per NCAA transfer rules, Green-Beckham was required to sit out for the entire year. Green-Beckham attempted to post a waiver request in order to make him eligible to play for the year, but NCAA declined it.

In January 2015, Green-Beckham announced he would be entering the 2015 NFL draft. During his time at Oklahoma, he spent his season on the scout team and didn't play a single down for the Sooners before declaring for the draft.

=== Statistics ===
Year	Team	Games	Receiving				Rushing			
Year	Team	Games	Rec	Yards	Avg	Rec TD	Att	Yards	Avg	TD
2012	Missouri	11	28	395	14.1	5	5	16	3.2	0
2013	Missouri	14	59	883	15.0	12	1	3	3.0	0
Career		25	87	1,278	14.7	17	6	19	3.2	0

== Professional career ==
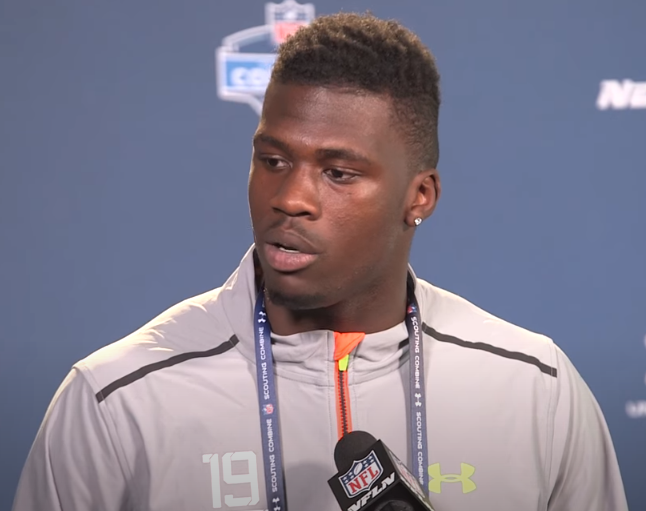
Green-Beckham at the NFL Scouting Combine in 2015

Pre-draft measurables
Height	Weight	Arm length	Hand span	40-yard dash	10-yard split	20-yard split	20-yard shuttle	Three-cone drill	Vertical jump	Broad jump	Bench press	Wonderlic
6 ft 5 1/8 in (1.96 m)	237 lb (108 kg)	32 1/2 in (0.83 m)	9 in (0.23 m)	4.49 s	1.60 s	2.66 s	4.45 s	6.89 s	33 1/2 in (0.85 m)	9 ft 11 in (3.02 m)	13 reps	20
All values from NFL Combine and Pro Day

=== Tennessee Titans ===
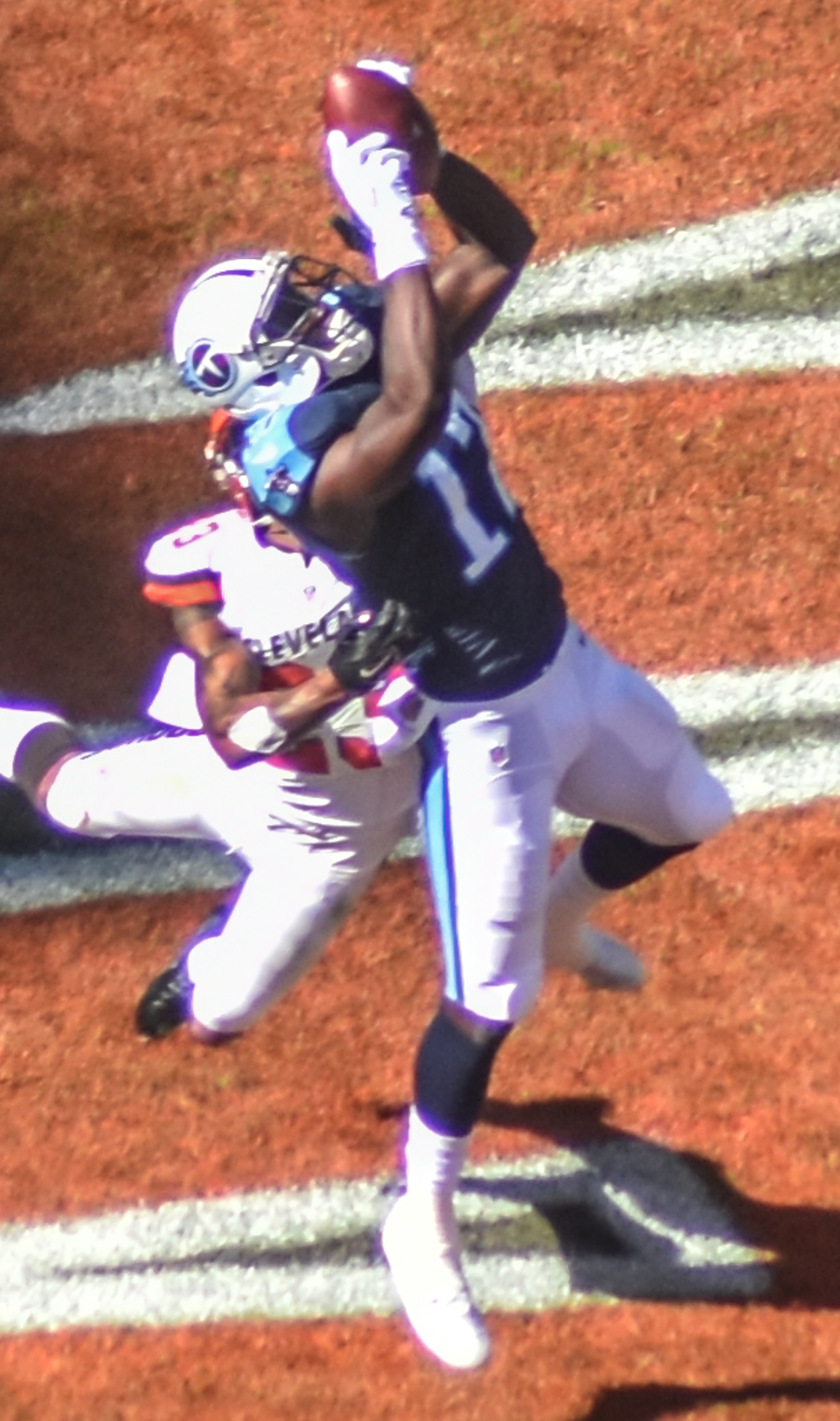
Green-Beckham with the Tennessee Titans in 2015

Green-Beckham was selected with the 40th overall pick in the second round of the 2015 NFL draft by the Tennessee Titans. On June 1, 2015, the Titans signed Green-Beckham to a four-year, $5.6 million contract with $3.0 million guaranteed and a $2.3 million signing bonus.

He made his first appearance with the Titans during their 2015 season opening victory over the Tampa Bay Buccaneers. The next game he made his first career catch on a 13-yard touchdown pass from Marcus Mariota in a 28–14 loss at the Cleveland Browns. On September 27, 2015, Green-Beckham became the third player in the Titans' history to score touchdowns on his first two NFL receptions. On October 25, 2015, he made his first career start in a 10–7 loss to the Atlanta Falcons. He made his second career start during a Week 9 matchup at the New Orleans Saints, filling in for an injured Kendall Wright and made five catches for 77-yards. During a Week 13 contest against the Jacksonville Jaguars, Green-Beckham made five receptions for a season-high 119 receiving yards, including a 47-yard touchdown reception in the fourth quarter. On December 20, 2015, he caught a season-high 6 passes for 113-yards in a 33–16 loss to the New England Patriots. As a rookie in 2015, Green-Beckham played 16 games with 549 receiving yards and four touchdowns.

=== Philadelphia Eagles ===
On August 16, 2016, Green-Beckham was traded to Philadelphia Eagles in exchange for offensive tackle Dennis Kelly. In the 2016 season with the Eagles, Green-Beckham appeared in 15 games with 392 receiving yards and two touchdowns. On June 30, 2017, he was waived by the Eagles.

== Personal life ==
Green-Beckham was born as the third of six children born to Charmelle Green, a single mother, in St. Louis, Missouri. He never knew his biological father, and lived in several foster homes before John Beckham, his high school coach, and his wife, Tracy, officially adopted him on December 30, 2009. The Beckhams had brought Green-Beckham and his younger brother Darnell into their home in 2006. The couple has one other child, a young daughter, with whom Green-Beckham is very close.

Darnell Green-Beckham received treatment for acute lymphoblastic leukemia, but is currently in remission. Darnell had signed a letter of intent to play for Missouri, but decided to pursue a career in modeling instead.

=== Legal issues ===
On October 3, 2012, Green-Beckham and two other freshman teammates, linebacker Torey Boozer and receiver Levi Copelin, were arrested on marijuana charges by the University of Missouri police department after the three were found in possession of 35 grams (1.2 oz) or less of marijuana. They were suspended from the next game, October 6 against Vanderbilt. The case was resolved on October 16, 2012, when Green-Beckham entered a guilty plea to a reduced charge of trespassing in Columbia, Missouri Municipal Court. He was fined $200 plus court costs.

On January 10, 2014, Green-Beckham was arrested again on a marijuana charge. Police found one pound (0.45 kg) of marijuana in the car he was riding in. According to the Springfield News-Leader, Green-Beckham was originally arrested for possession of a controlled substance with intent to distribute following a traffic stop but was later released without charges, pending further investigation. Later evidence indicated the marijuana belonged to another passenger in the car.

On April 11, 2014, Green-Beckham was dismissed from the University of Missouri football team, following his prior drug-related problems and an incident in which he allegedly forced open an apartment door and pushed a woman down a flight of stairs. Green-Beckham was not charged in the last incident. Head coach Gary Pinkel said in a prepared statement, "This decision was made with the best interests of all involved in mind. Dorial's priority going forward needs to be focusing on getting the help he needs. As we have all along, we will continue to do everything we can to assist Dorial and his family. We care deeply about Dorial and his well-being, but hopefully he can benefit from a fresh start."

On December 29, 2017, he was arrested for DWI in Springfield, Missouri, and pleaded guilty and was given probation. On December 20, 2018, he was arrested in Springfield on possession of a controlled substance (less than 35 grams of marijuana) and resisting arrest.

On August 28, 2021, he was arrested in Kansas City, Missouri, on four assault charges, property damage, and resisting arrest.

On November 22, 2021, Green-Beckham was sentenced to 180 days in Greene County jail in Greene County, Missouri, for violation of probation.
