= 2013 Missouri Tigers football team =

American college football season

2013 Missouri Tigers football

SEC Eastern Division champion Cotton Bowl Classic champion

SEC Championship Game, L 42–59 vs. Auburn

Cotton Bowl Classic, W 41–31 vs. Oklahoma State
- Conference: Southeastern Conference
- Eastern Division

Ranking
- Coaches: No. 5
- AP: No. 5
- Record: 12–2 (7–1 SEC)
- Head coach: Gary Pinkel (13th season)
- Offensive coordinator: Josh Henson (1st season)
- Offensive scheme: Spread
- Defensive coordinator: Dave Steckel (5th season)
- Base defense: 4–3
- Home stadium: Faurot Field

2013 Southeastern Conference football standings
	Conf.			Overall
Team	W		L	W		L
Eastern Division
No. 5 Missouri x	7	–	1	12	–	2
No. 4 South Carolina	6	–	2	11	–	2
Georgia	5	–	3	8	–	5
No. 24 Vanderbilt	4	–	4	9	–	4
Florida	3	–	5	4	–	8
Tennessee	2	–	6	5	–	7
Kentucky	0	–	8	2	–	10
Western Division
No. 2 Auburn xy$	7	–	1	12	–	2
No. 7 Alabama x%	7	–	1	11	–	2
No. 14 LSU *	5	–	3	10	–	3
No. 18 Texas A&M	4	–	4	9	–	4
Mississippi State	3	–	5	7	–	6
Ole Miss *	3	–	5	8	–	5
Arkansas	0	–	8	3	–	9
Championship: Auburn 59, Missouri 42
$ – BCS representative as conference champion; % – BCS at-large representative; x – Division champion/co-champions; y – Championship game participant; * LSU and Ole Miss vacated all wins (except for Ole Miss' Music City Bowl win) due to NCAA violations.; Rankings from AP Poll

The 2013 Missouri Tigers football team (also called "Mizzou") represented the University of Missouri in the 2013 NCAA Division I FBS football season. It marked the Tigers' second season as a member of the Southeastern Conference (SEC) in the Eastern Division. The team was led by head coach Gary Pinkel, in his 13th year and played its home games at Faurot Field in Columbia, Missouri. The Tigers went into the season hoping to return to a bowl game after missing out the previous season. They succeeded after an 11–1 regular season and their first-ever SEC Eastern Division title. After a loss to Auburn in the SEC Championship Game they played in the 2014 Cotton Bowl Classic on January 3, 2014, against Oklahoma State, which they won 41–31. The two teams had last met on October 22, 2011.

== Recruits ==
Key losses:

- DT Sheldon Richardson
- DE Brad Madison
- WR T. J. Moe
- OL Trey Foster
- OL Jack Meiners
- RB Kendial Lawrence

All 20 recruits signed their National Letter of Intent on February 6, during the National Signing Period (February 6 – April 1).

On the eve of National Signing Day, Missouri ranks last in the SEC, 46th in the overall rankings according to Rivals.com.
On the day after National Signing Day, Scout.com ranks Missouri as 36th (3.00) best overall, ahead of only Kentucky (39th) in the SEC.
Rivals.com has Mizzou at 39th (3.00).

Coach Pinkel likes the 20-name recruiting class.

His coaching staff agrees with his analysis, as does former Mizzou wide receiver Jeremy Maclin.

Mizzou's class has 11 of the 20 recruits from Missouri. In 2011, Mizzou had 19 recruits, and in 2010, only 17.

The team added a needed defensive tackle, DeQuinton Osborne on May 31, 2013, but MU has not officially announced Osborne's addition to the recruiting class.

Four recruits of the 20 (listed in the recruit section below) left the program for various reasons. Freshman offensive tackle Harneet Gill left the Missouri football team three days into preseason camp after deciding he had “lost faith in the plan” to treat his surgically repaired foot and that Mizzou was not “the right fit,” he said. Tailback Chase Abbington (Fort Zumwalt South) and defensive lineman Antar Thompson (Maplewood Richmond Heights) both failed to qualify academically and enrolled in junior college. Duron Singleton, a safety from Fresno City, CA, Community College, was expected to transfer and arrive last week, but Pinkel announced Thursday that Singleton wasn't joining the program, citing undisclosed “personal reasons.”

== Schedule ==
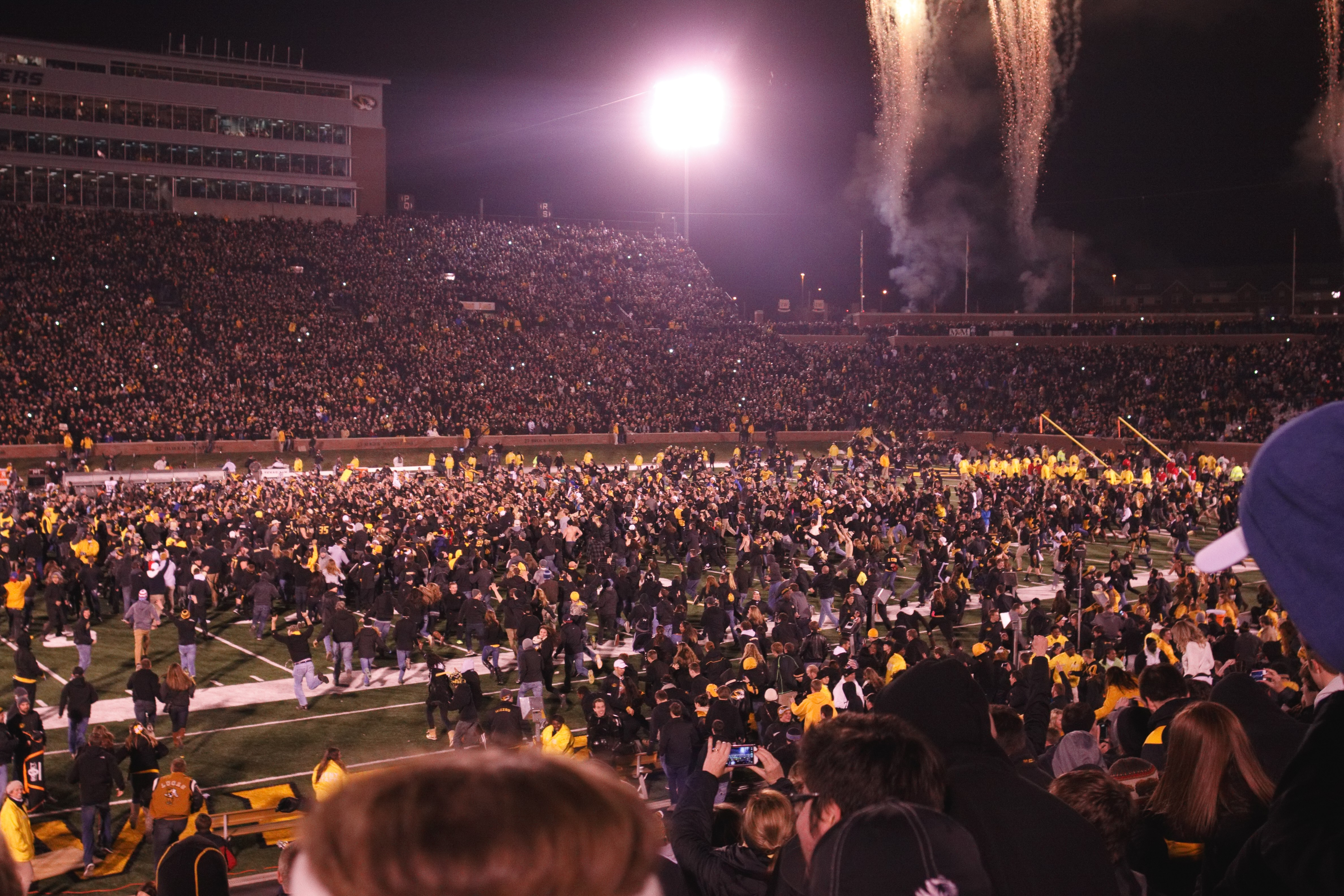
Fans rush the field after the Missouri Tigers beat Texas A&M and won the SEC Eastern Division title for the first time.

Date	Time	Opponent	Rank	Site	TV	Result	Attendance
August 31	6:00 p.m.	Murray State*		Faurot Field; Columbia, MO	PPV	W 58–14	58,038
September 7	2:30 p.m.	Toledo*		Faurot Field; Columbia, MO	ESPNU	W 38–23	56,785
September 21	7:00 p.m.	at Indiana*		Memorial Stadium; Bloomington, IN	BTN	W 45–28	49,149
September 28	6:30 p.m.	Arkansas State*		Faurot Field; Columbia, MO	CSS/FSMW	W 41–19	62,468
October 5	6:30 p.m.	at Vanderbilt		Vanderbilt Stadium; Nashville, TN	CSS/FSMW	W 51–28	36,892
October 12	11:00 a.m.	at No. 7 Georgia	No. 25	Sanford Stadium; Athens, GA	ESPN	W 41–26	92,746
October 19	11:21 a.m.	No. 22 Florida	No. 14	Faurot Field; Columbia, MO	SECTV	W 36–17	67,124
October 26	6:00 p.m.	No. 20 South Carolina^{†}	No. 5	Faurot Field; Columbia, MO	ESPN2	L 24–27 ^{2OT}	67,124
November 2	6:00 p.m.	Tennessee	No. 10	Faurot Field; Columbia, MO	ESPN	W 31–3	65,869
November 9	11:00 a.m.	at Kentucky	No. 9	Commonwealth Stadium; Lexington, KY	ESPNU	W 48–17	55,280
November 23	6:45 p.m.	at No. 24 Ole Miss	No. 8	Vaught–Hemingway Stadium; Oxford, MS	ESPN	W 24–10	61,168
November 30	6:45 p.m.	No. 19 Texas A&M	No. 5	Faurot Field; Columbia, MO	ESPN	W 28–21	67,124
December 7	3:00 p.m.	vs. No. 3 Auburn	No. 5	Georgia Dome; Atlanta, GA (SEC Championship Game)	CBS	L 42–59	75,632
January 3, 2014	7:00 p.m.	vs. No. 13 Oklahoma State*	No. 9	AT&T Stadium; Arlington, TX (Cotton Bowl Classic)	FOX	W 41–31	72,690
*Non-conference game; ^{†}Homecoming; Rankings from AP Poll released prior to the game; All times are in Central time

Mizzou Tigers, schedule, as of December 8, 2013 (Retrieved: December 8, 2013)

== Recruits for 2013 ==
College recruiting (2013)
Name	Hometown	School	Height	Weight	40^{‡}	Commit date
Chase Abbington; RB	St. Peters, MO	Fort Zumwalt South HS	6 ft 4 in (1.93 m)	210 lb (95 kg)	4.40	Mar 3, 2012
Chase Abbington; RB	Recruit ratings: Scout: Rivals: (82)					
Alec Abeln; C	St. Louis, MO	St. Louis University HS	6 ft 4 in (1.93 m)	272 lb (123 kg)	5.20	Mar 1, 2012
Alec Abeln; C	Recruit ratings: Scout: Rivals: (66)					
Josh Augusta; DT	Peoria, IL	Peoria HS	6 ft 4.5 in (1.94 m)	275 lb (125 kg)	N/A	Jan 20, 2013
Josh Augusta; DT	Recruit ratings: Scout: Rivals: (83)					
Eric Beisel; MLB	Fenton, MO	Rockwood Summit Senior HS	6 ft 4 in (1.93 m)	236 lb (107 kg)	4.51	Jul 26, 2012
Eric Beisel; MLB	Recruit ratings: Scout: Rivals: (82)					
Joe Burkett; OLB	Jefferson City, MO	Jefferson City HS	6 ft 3 in (1.91 m)	200 lb (91 kg)	4.61	Feb 11, 2012
Joe Burkett; OLB	Recruit ratings: Scout: Rivals: (78)					
Nate Crawford; DE	Pensacola, FL	West Florida HS technical	6 ft 3.5 in (1.92 m)	255 lb (116 kg)	5.35	Oct 13, 2012
Nate Crawford; DE	Recruit ratings: Scout: Rivals: (74)					
Harneet Gill; OT	St. Charles, MO	Francis Howell HS	6 ft 6 in (1.98 m)	253 lb (115 kg)	5.00	Mar 5, 2012
Harneet Gill; OT	Recruit ratings: Scout: Rivals: (75)					
Charles Harris; DE	Kansas City, MO	Lincoln College Prep	6 ft 4 in (1.93 m)	220 lb (100 kg)	N/A	Feb 6, 2013
Charles Harris; DE	Recruit ratings: Scout: Rivals: (N/A)					
Trent Hosick; QB	Kansas City, MO	Staley HS	6 ft 1.5 in (1.87 m)	217 lb (98 kg)	4.65	Apr 14, 2012
Trent Hosick; QB	Recruit ratings: Scout: Rivals: (77)					
A.J. Logan; DT	Columbia, MO	Rock Bridge Senior HS	6 ft 2 in (1.88 m)	312 lb (142 kg)	5.20	Sep 1, 2012
A.J. Logan; DT	Recruit ratings: Scout: Rivals: (72)					
Marcus Loud; DE	Houston, TX	Wheatley HS	6 ft 4 in (1.93 m)	237 lb (108 kg)	4.70	Dec 7, 2012
Marcus Loud; DE	Recruit ratings: Scout: Rivals: (75)					
J'Mon Moore; WR	Missouri City, TX	Lawrence E Elkins HS	6 ft 2.5 in (1.89 m)	171 lb (78 kg)	4.50	Apr 17, 2012
J'Mon Moore; WR	Recruit ratings: Scout: Rivals: (74)					
Aarion Penton; CB	St. Louis, MO	Christian Brothers College HS	5 ft 9.5 in (1.77 m)	172 lb (78 kg)	4.43	Feb 11, 2012
Aarion Penton; CB	Recruit ratings: Scout: Rivals: (76)					
Eddie Printz; QB	Marietta, GA	Lassiter HS	6 ft 3.5 in (1.92 m)	205 lb (93 kg)	4.60	Oct 12, 2012
Eddie Printz; QB	Recruit ratings: Scout: Rivals: (76)					
Jason Reese; TE	Euless, TX	Trinity HS	6 ft 4.5 in (1.94 m)	220 lb (100 kg)	4.65	Dec 29, 2012
Jason Reese; TE	Recruit ratings: Scout: Rivals: (73)					
Clay Rhodes; OT	Stilwell, Kansas	Blue Valley HS	6 ft 6 in (1.98 m)	262 lb (119 kg)	4.90	May 2, 2012
Clay Rhodes; OT	Recruit ratings: Scout: Rivals: (76)					
Shaun Rupert; S	Montgomery, AL	Carver Senior HS	6 ft 1.5 in (1.87 m)	185 lb (84 kg)	5.50	Feb 2, 2013
Shaun Rupert; S	Recruit ratings: Scout: Rivals: (73)					
Anthony Sherrils; CB/DB	Kansas City, MO	Hogan Preparatoy Academy HS	6 ft 0.5 in (1.84 m)	172 lb (78 kg)	4.50	Feb 16, 2012
Anthony Sherrils; CB/DB	Recruit ratings: Scout: Rivals: (80)					
Duron Singleton; S	New Orleans, LA	Fresno City CC	6 ft 1 in (1.85 m)	210 lb (95 kg)	4.50	Feb 5, 2013
Duron Singleton; S	Recruit ratings: Scout: Rivals: (N/A)					
Antar Thompson; DT	Maplewood, MO	Maplewood-Richmond Heights HS	6 ft 3 in (1.91 m)	292 lb (132 kg)	5.00	May 5, 2012
Antar Thompson; DT	Recruit ratings: Scout: Rivals: (79)					
Overall recruit ranking: Scout: 3.00 (#36) Rivals: 3.00 (#39) ESPN: 76
‡ Refers to 40-yard dash; Note: In many cases, Scout, Rivals, 247Sports, On3, and ESPN may conflict in their listings of height, weight and 40 time.; In these cases, the average was taken. ESPN grades are on a 100-point scale.; Sources: "Missouri 2013 Football Commitments". Rivals.; "2013 Missouri Commits". Scout.; "2013 Player Commitments – Missouri". ESPN.; "Scout.com Team Recruiting Rankings". Scout.; "2013 Team Ranking". Rivals.com.

== Honors ==
On December 9, 2013, defensive end Michael Sam was named the SEC Defensive Player of the Year by the Associated Press, and was also a unanimous first-team All-SEC selection. Before the bowl season starts, Sam led the SEC with 10.5 sacks and 18 tackles for loss. Offensive tackle Justin Britt was also named to the first-team AP all-conference, as was defensive lineman Kony Ealy, and cornerback E.J. Gaines. Wide receiver Dorial Green-Beckham and linebacker Andrew Wilson were named to the second-team list. Defensive end Markus Golden made the honorable mention list. Ealy had the strongest finish to the regular season of any Mizzou defender and heads into bowl season with 7.5 sacks, 12.5 tackles for loss, a team-best 14 hurries and three forced fumbles, the most among all SEC defensive lineman. Gaines finished the regular season with 68 tackles and a team-best four interceptions. In the December 7 loss to Auburn in the SEC title game, he picked up a fumble forced by Ealy, and returned it for a touchdown. He also earned first-team All-Big 12 honors as a sophomore in 2011. With a huge game against Auburn, Green-Beckham now shares the team lead with 55 catches for 850 yards and a team-best 12 touchdowns. Wilson leads Mizzou in tackles for a third straight season with 98, matching his 2011 total. Coach Gary Pinkel is one of eight finalists for the Eddie Robinson Coach of the Year award.

Michael Sam named a Walter Camp Football Foundation First-Team All-American, the seventh for Coach Pinkel in his 13 years at Mizzou, and the first on the defensive side for Mizzou since Justin Smith in 2000.

== Rankings ==
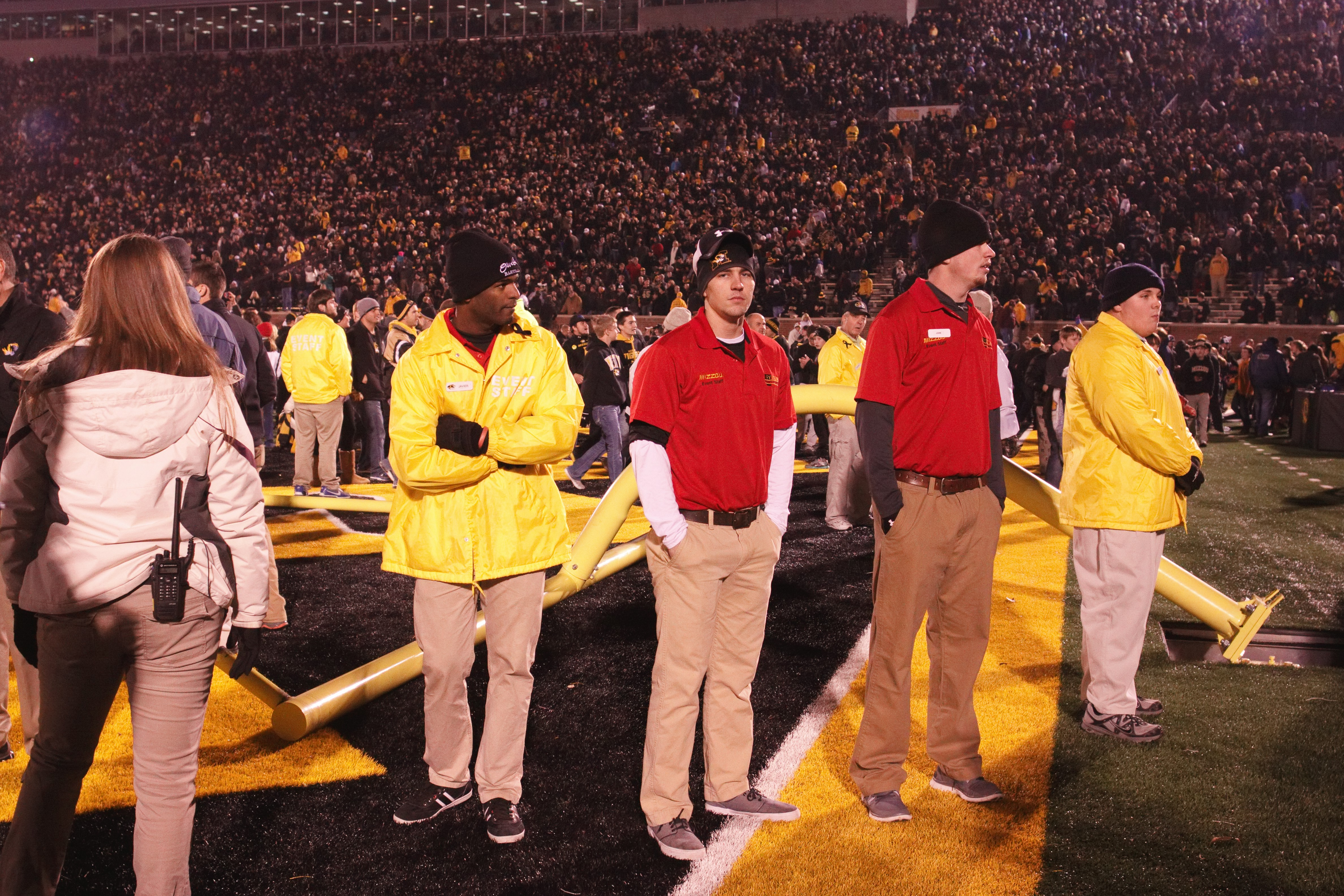
Mizzou Athletics personnel form a perimeter around a dismantled field goal post on Faurot Field when fans rushed the field after defeating Texas A&M November 30th.

Missouri cracked the AP poll (#25) on October 6, for the first time since the second week of the 2011 season when it was ranked #21. Missouri jumped nine slots to #5 in the AP poll on October 19, after their 36–17 win over #22 Florida. The #5 ranking is Missouri's highest since reaching No. 3 in 2008 at 5–0 before a home loss to Oklahoma State. They debuted at #5 in the BCS standings. They reached #5 again on the AP poll on Nov. 24, after beating #24 Ole Miss, 24–10, at Oxford the day before, and stayed at #5 on all four polls after beating Texas A&M on Nov. 30. The Tigers fell to #9 after its 42–59 loss to the Auburn Tigers in the 2013 SEC Championship Game on December 7, ending its bid for a possible trip to the BCS National Championship Game. The 2013 Tigers team is the fourth in the past seven years to reach double-digits in wins, with the previous time a 10–3 record in 2010. Missouri ended the SEC season with an 11–2 record. Mizzou extended its nation-leading streak of games forcing a takeaway to 43 consecutive games. Mizzou has jumped on top of opposing teams on the scoreboard all season, only trailing at the half for the second time this season vs. Auburn. The 8th ranked (BCS) Tigers were invited to and accepted an invitation to the 78th Cotton Bowl against the (10–2) #13-ranked Oklahoma State Cowboys on January 3, 2014, 7pm CT, to be televised on Fox. The Cotton Bowl appearance will mark Mizzou's 11th New Year's Day (or later) bowl game in program history, and its first since playing in the 2008 Cotton Bowl against the Arkansas Razorbacks. The invitation is a reward for an outstanding season which saw the Tigers post one of the top turnaround years in the nation, going from 5–7 in 2012 to 11–2 – a 6-1/2 game improvement. This is MU's 30th alltime bowl appearance. The Tigers will be making their third appearance in the tradition-rich game. Mizzou rolled to a 38–7 win over Arkansas in the 2008 game, as TB Tony Temple rushed for a Cotton Bowl-record 281 yards and four touchdowns against the 25th-ranked Razorbacks. That win closed a stellar season for Mizzou, who finished with a 12–2 record and a school-best final ranking of 4th in the final polls. Mizzou's other appearance in the Cotton Bowl was back in 1946, when Texas claimed a 40–27 victory.

Ranking movements Legend: ██ Increase in ranking ██ Decrease in ranking — = Not ranked RV = Received votes
	Week																
Poll	Pre	1	2	3	4	5	6	7	8	9	10	11	12	13	14	15	Final
AP	—	—	—	—	RV	RV	25	14	5	10	9	9	8	5	5	9	5
Coaches	—	RV	—	—	RV	RV	RV	14	7	10	9	8	8	6	5	9	5
Harris	Not released							14	6	9	8	8	8	6	5	9	Not released
BCS	Not released								5	9	8	9	8	5	5	8	Not released

== Coaching staff ==
Name	Position	Years at MU	Alma mater (year)
Gary Pinkel	Head coach	13	Kent State (1975)
Dave Steckel	Assistant head coach Defensive coordinator Linebackers coach	13	Kutztown (1982)
Andy Hill	Quarterbacks Coach; Associate head coach	18	University of Missouri (1985)
Josh Henson	Offensive coordinator Co-offensive line coach	5	Oklahoma State (1998)
Alex Grinch	Secondary and Safeties Coach	5	Mount Union (2002)
Cornell Ford	Cornerbacks coach	13	Toledo (1991)
Pat Washington	Receivers Coach	1	Auburn (1987)
Brian Jones	Running backs coach	13	Connecticut (1981)
Craig Kuligowski	Defensive line coach	13	Toledo (1991)
Bruce Walker	Co-offensive line coach	13	Central Washington (1983)
Dan Hopkins	Director of football operations	7	University of Missouri (2004)
Nick Otterbacher	Director of Football Recruiting	10	Toledo (2002)

Henson expected to take over as Missouri's offensive coordinator

Source: 2013 Mizzou Football Roster (coaches)

== Roster ==
SUMMER 2013 (as of August 30, 2013)
(Preseason depth chart)

(as of SUMMER 2013 MUTIGERS.com, and Rivals.com)
Wide receivers (Summer 2013): 2 L'Damian Washington – (redshirt) Senior; 4 J'Mon Moore – Freshman; 5 James Driskell – Sophomore; 8 Darius White – (redshirt) Junior; 14 Jaleel Clark – (redshirt) Senior; 15 Dorial Green-Beckham – Sophomore; 16 Levi Copelin – (redshirt) Freshman; 17 Sheldon Gerau – (redshirt) Sophomore; 18 Wesley Leftwich – (redshirt) Sophomore; 21 Bud Sasser – (redshirt) Junior; 26 Jake Brents (redshirt) Freshman; 38 Nicalus Rhone – Freshman; 38 Reid Swearingen – (redshirt) Freshman; 41 Aaron Bailey – Freshman; 41 Eric Laurent – (redshirt) Freshman; 43 Cameron Chancey – (redshirt) Sophomore; 84 Gavin Otte – Junior; 85 Marcus Lucas – Senior; 88 Jimmie Hunt – (redshirt) Junior; Offensive line (Summer 2013): 51 Steven Carberry – (redshirt) Junior; 52 Jordan Hill – Freshman; 54 Nick Monaghan – (redshirt) Sophomore; 56 Robert Luce – (redshirt) Junior; 57 Alec Abeln – Freshman; 58 John Reid – Freshman; 59 Kyle Starke – (redshirt) Sophomore; 60 Connor McGovern – (redshirt) Sophomore; 61 Max Copeland – (redshirt) Senior; 62 Taylor Chappell – (redshirt) Sophomore; 63 Brad McNulty – (redshirt) Sophomore; 64 Will Johnson – (redshirt) Freshman; 65 Mitch Morse – (redshirt) Junior; 66 Adam Ploudre – Freshman; 67 Michael Boddie – (redshirt) Sophomore; 68 Justin Britt – (redshirt) Senior; 69 Mitch Hall – (redshirt) Sophomore; 70 Anthony Gatti – (redshirt) Junior; 71 Justin Grava – (redshirt) Freshman; 72 Clay Rhodes – Freshman; 73 Mitch Hall – (redshirt) Sophomore; 76 Jordan Williams – (redshirt) Freshman; 77 Evan Boehm – Sophomore; 78 Nick Demien – (redshirt) Junior; 79 Adam Franklin – (redshirt) Sophomore; 93 Justin Grava – (redshirt) Freshman; Tight ends (Summer 2013): 46 Kyle Peasel – (redshirt) Senior; 80 Sean Culkin – (redshirt) Freshman; 81 Eric Waters – Senior; 82 Jason Reese – Freshman; 84 Brandon Colbert – Junior; 86 Jake Hurrell – (redshirt) Freshman; 89 Tyler Hanneke – (redshirt) Freshman; 90 Berlin Hollomon – Freshman; 98 Clayton Echard – (redshirt) Sophomore	Quarterbacks (Summer 2013): 1 James Franklin – Senior; 7 Maty Mauk – (redshirt) Freshman; 9 Eddie Printz – Freshman; 11 Trent Hosick – Freshman; 12 Colby Carpenter – Freshman; 13 Corbin Berkstresser – (redshirt) Sophomore; 17 Alex Demczak – Junior; Running (tail) backs (Summer 2013): 6 Marcus Murphy – (redshirt) Junior; 20 Henry Josey – (redshirt) Junior; 24 Greg White – (redshirt) Junior; 32 Russell Hansbrough – Sophomore; 35 Tyler Hunt – Sophomore; 36 Morgan Steward – (redshirt) Freshman; 39 Miles Drummond – (redshirt) Freshman; 40 Andrew Stevens – (redshirt) Freshman; 46 Stephen Blakley – Freshman; Defensive line (Summer 2013): 33 Markus Golden (end) – (redshirt) Junior; 35 Marcus Loud – Freshman; 47 Kony Ealy (end) – (redshirt) Junior; 50 Evan Winston – (redshirt) Freshman; 51 Steven Mack – (redshirt) Junior; 52 Michael Sam (end) – (redshirt) Senior; 55 Brayden Burnett – (redshirt) Senior; 56 Shane Ray – (redshirt) Sophomore; 58 Ben Eskelson – (redshirt) Freshman; 64 DeQuinton Osborne – Freshman; 75 A.J. Logan – Freshman; 87 Nate Crawford – Freshman; 89 Matt Hoch – (redshirt) Junior; 90 Harold Brantley – (redshirt) Freshman; 91 Charles Harris – Freshman; 93 Dakota Brake – Freshman; 94 Marvin Foster – (redshirt) Senior; 95 Rickey Hatley – (redshirt) Freshman; 96 Lucas Vincent – (redshirt) Junior; 97 Josh Augusta – Freshman; 99 David Butler – (redshirt) Junior; Linebackers (Summer 2013): 8 Donovan Bonner – (redshirt) Senior; 10 Kentrell Brothers – (redshirt) Sophomore; ~~11 Torey Boozer – Freshman~~ †; 12 Darvin Ruise – (redshirt) Junior; 25 Donavin Newsom – (redshirt) Freshman; 30 Michael Scherer – (redshirt) Freshman; 40 Clarence Green – (redshirt) Sophomore; 43 Michael Holt – Freshman; 48 Andrew Wilson – (redshirt) Senior; 49 Denzel Martin – (redshirt) Senior; 53 Christian Williams – (redshirt) Freshman; 54 Michael Brennan – Senior	Safety (Summer 2013): 4 Daniel Easterly – (redshirt) Junior; 5 Cortland Browning – (redshirt) Sophomore; 9 Braylon Webb – (redshirt) Junior; 10 Brock Bondurant – (redshirt) Freshman; 13 Chaston Ward – (redshirt) Freshman; 18 Michael Godas – (redshirt) Sophomore; 19 Shawn Rupert – Freshman; 21 Ian Simon – (redshirt) Sophomore; Strong safety (Spring 2013) Free safety (Spring 2013): 17 Matt White (American football)|Matt White – (redshirt) Senior; Defensive backs (Summer 2013): 1 John Gibson – (redshirt) Freshman; ~~2 Duron Singleton – Junior~~ *; 3 David Johnson – (redshirt) Sophomore; 7 Randy Ponder – (redshirt) Senior; 11 Aarion Penton – Freshman; 22 Anthony Sherrils – Freshman; 24 Mubarak Nasirudden – (redshirt) Freshman; 26 Xavier Smith – (redshirt) Junior; 28 Ernest Payton – (redshirt) Sophomore; 29 Zach Edwards – (redshirt) Freshman; 29 David Sowell – Freshman; 31 E. J. Gaines – Senior; 34 Jordan Wade – Junior; 45 Tyler Davis – (redshirt) Senior; 46 Jared Edwards – (redshirt) Freshman; Punters (Summer 2013): 92 Christian Brinser – (redshirt) Junior; Kickers (Summer 2013): 3 Luke Jackson – Freshman; 12 Preston Soper – Freshman; 90 Nick Coffman – (redshirt) Freshman; 91 Blake Owens – (redshirt) Junior; 99 Andrew Baggett – (redshirt) Sophomore
† Kicked off team, June 17, 2013 * Left team for personal reasons, August 1
