= 2013 Florida Gators football team =

American college football season

2013 Florida Gators football
- Conference: Southeastern Conference
- Eastern Division
- Record: 4–8 (3–5 SEC)
- Head coach: Will Muschamp (3rd season)
- Offensive coordinator: Brent Pease (2nd season)
- Offensive scheme: Pro-style
- Defensive coordinator: D. J. Durkin (1st season)
- Base defense: Multiple 4–3
- Home stadium: Ben Hill Griffin Stadium

2013 Southeastern Conference football standings
	Conf.			Overall
Team	W		L	W		L
Eastern Division
No. 5 Missouri x	7	–	1	12	–	2
No. 4 South Carolina	6	–	2	11	–	2
Georgia	5	–	3	8	–	5
No. 24 Vanderbilt	4	–	4	9	–	4
Florida	3	–	5	4	–	8
Tennessee	2	–	6	5	–	7
Kentucky	0	–	8	2	–	10
Western Division
No. 2 Auburn xy$	7	–	1	12	–	2
No. 7 Alabama x%	7	–	1	11	–	2
No. 14 LSU *	5	–	3	10	–	3
No. 18 Texas A&M	4	–	4	9	–	4
Mississippi State	3	–	5	7	–	6
Ole Miss *	3	–	5	8	–	5
Arkansas	0	–	8	3	–	9
Championship: Auburn 59, Missouri 42
$ – BCS representative as conference champion; % – BCS at-large representative; x – Division champion/co-champions; y – Championship game participant; * LSU and Ole Miss vacated all wins (except for Ole Miss' Music City Bowl win) due to NCAA violations.; Rankings from AP Poll

The 2013 Florida Gators football team represented the University of Florida in the sport of American football during the 2013 NCAA Division I FBS football season. The Gators competed in the Football Bowl Subdivision (FBS) of the National Collegiate Athletic Association (NCAA) and the Eastern Division of the Southeastern Conference (SEC). They played their home games at Ben Hill Griffin Stadium on the university's Gainesville, Florida, campus, and the 2013 season was the Gators' third under head coach Will Muschamp. The Gators finished the season with a 4–8 overall win–loss record and finished 3–5 in the SEC and in fifth place in the SEC Eastern Division. The Gators suffered their first losing season since 1979 and did not play in a bowl game for the first time since 1990, when the program was on NCAA probation.

== 2013 recap ==
Following their success in 2012, the Gators were ranked No. 10 in both major polls coming into the 2013 season. They opened with a 24–6 home win over Toledo, then fell 21–16 to in-state rival Miami in a game in which the Gators gained almost twice as many yards as the Hurricanes but committed 5 turnovers, including a crucial late interception in the red zone.

The Gators next beat the SEC rival Tennessee Volunteers at home but lost starting quarterback Jeff Driskel for the rest of the season with a broken leg. Tyler Murphy finished the Tennessee game at quarterback and garnered praise for his play in consecutive wins over Kentucky and Arkansas, at which point the team's record was 4–1.

The offense was held to just two field goals in the next game, a 17–6 loss at No. 10 LSU. This contest would start several negative trends, as the Gators ended the season on a seven-game losing streak in which the offense struggled mightily while major injuries ended the season for a dozen starting players, including Tyler Murphy and defensive leader Dominique Easley.

For the first time since the winless 1979 team, the Gators finished the 2013 season with a losing record. Several other streaks were broken, including 22 consecutive seasons going to a bowl game and a 22-game win streak against Vanderbilt. With a November loss to Georgia Southern, Florida suffered its first-ever defeat to a lower division team and its first loss to a current FCS team since the winless 1946 Gators lost to Villanova. The Gator offense was ranked 112th nationally.

Despite calls from the fanbase to fire Will Muschamp for the team's performance, UF athletic director Jeremy Foley repeated several times that he would remain the Gators head coach through 2014. However, offensive coordinator Brent Pease and offensive line coach Tim Davis were fired on the day after the season finale. Muschamp hired Kurt Roper as the new offensive coordinator.

== Schedule ==
Date	Opponent	Rank	Site	TV	Result	Attendance
August 31	Toledo*	No. 10	Ben Hill Griffin Stadium; Gainesville, FL	SECTV	W 24–6	83,604
September 7	at Miami (FL)*	No. 12	Sun Life Stadium; Miami Gardens, FL (rivalry)	ESPN	L 16–21	76,968
September 21	Tennessee	No. 19	Ben Hill Griffin Stadium; Gainesville, FL (rivalry)	CBS	W 31–17	90,074
September 28	at Kentucky	No. 20	Commonwealth Stadium; Lexington, KY (rivalry)	ESPNU	W 24–7	62,076
October 5	Arkansas	No. 18	Ben Hill Griffin Stadium; Gainesville, FL	ESPN2	W 30–10	90,043
October 12	at No. 10 LSU	No. 17	Tiger Stadium; Baton Rouge, LA (rivalry)	CBS	L 6–17	92,980
October 19	at No. 14 Missouri	No. 22	Faurot Field; Columbia, MO	SECTV	L 17–36	67,124
November 2	vs. Georgia		EverBank Field; Jacksonville, FL (rivalry)	CBS	L 20–23	84,693
November 9	Vanderbilt^{†}		Ben Hill Griffin Stadium; Gainesville, FL	FSN/Sun	L 17–34	88,004
November 16	at No. 11 South Carolina		Williams-Brice Stadium; Columbia, SC	ESPN2	L 14–19	83,853
November 23	Georgia Southern*		Ben Hill Griffin Stadium; Gainesville, FL	PPV	L 20–26	82,459
November 30	No. 2 Florida State*		Ben Hill Griffin Stadium; Gainesville, FL (rivalry)	ESPN	L 7–37	90,454
*Non-conference game; ^{†}Homecoming; Rankings from AP Poll released prior to the game

== Rankings ==
The Gators fell out of the AP Top 25 on October 20 for the first time since the final rankings of the 2011 season, when they won the Gator Bowl, following their third loss of the season to Missouri on October 19.

Ranking movements Legend: ██ Increase in ranking ██ Decrease in ranking — = Not ranked RV = Received votes
	Week																
Poll	Pre	1	2	3	4	5	6	7	8	9	10	11	12	13	14	15	Final
AP	10	12	18	19	20	18	17	22	RV	RV	—	—	—	—	—	—	—
Coaches	10	9	20	18	19	19	17	22	RV	RV	—	—	—	—	—	—	—
Harris	Not released							21	RV	RV	—	—	—	—	—	—	Not released
BCS	Not released								—	—	—	—	—	—	—	—	Not released

== Roster ==
2013 Florida Gators roster
Quarterbacks: 6 Jeff Driskel – junior; 3 Tyler Murphy – (redshirt) junior; 17 Skyler Mornhinweg – (redshirt) freshman; 14 Chris Wilkes – Freshman; 9 Jacob Guy – (redshirt) freshman; 19 Ryan McGriff – (redshirt) sophomore; 12 Max Staver – freshman; 13 Christian Provancha – (redshirt) junior; 15 Ryan Parrish – (redshirt) junior; Running backs: 24 Matt Jones – sophomore (6'2, 228); 33 Mack Brown – (redshirt) junior (5'11, 215); 21 Kelvin Taylor – freshman (5'10, 214); 22 Adam Lane – freshman (5'7, 205); 37 Mark Herndon – sophomore; 10 Valdez Showers – (redshirt) sophomore; Full backs: 41 Hunter Joyer – junior (5'11, 233); 25 Gideon Ajagbe – (redshirt) junior (6'2, 243); 29 Rhaheim Ledbetter – (redshirt) freshman; Wide receivers: 1 Quinton Dunbar – (redshirt) junior (6'2, 194); 8 Trey Burton – senior (6'2, 224); 9 Latroy Pittman – sophomore (6'0, 207); 11 Demarcus Robinson – Freshman (6'2, 204); 4 Andre Debose – (redshirt) senior (6'0, 187); 81 Marqui Hawkins – freshman (6'1, 179); 89 Alvin Bailey – Freshman (6'0, 170); 5 Ahmad Fulwood – Freshman (6'4, 200); 85 Chris Thompson – Freshman (6'0, 167); 30 Michael McNeely – (redshirt) junior; 33 Chris Maignan – (redshirt) senior; 45 Braxton Skinner – (redshirt) senior; 81 Darius Masline – (redshirt) freshman; 83 Solomon Patton – senior; 86 Raphael Andrades – sophomore; 87 A. J. Mobley – (redshirt) junior; Tight ends: 18 Kent Taylor – sophomore; 82 Bair Diamond – (redshirt) freshman; 84 Colin Thompson – (redshirt) freshman; 87 Tevin Westbrook – junior; 88 Clay Burton – junior	Offensive line: 67 Jon Halapio – (redshirt) senior; 70 D. J. Humphries – sophomore; 72 Jonotthan Harrison – (redshirt) senior; 76 Max Garcia – (redshirt) junior; 75 Chaz Green – (redshirt) junior; 73 Tyler Moore – (redshirt) sophomore; 74 Trenton Brown – Junior; 64 Kyle Koehne – (redshirt) senior; 63 Trip Thurman – (redshirt) sophomore; 50 Octavius Jackson – Freshman; 71 Cameron Dillard – Freshman; 55 Rod Johnson – Freshman; 78 Quinteze Williams – (redshirt) freshman; 77 Ian Silberman – (redshirt) junior; 79 Matthew Fuchs – (redshirt) freshman; Defensive Line (NT)(DT): 2 Dominique Easley – senior (6'3, 286); 55 Darious Cummings – Junior (6'1, 309); 4 Damien Jacobs – senior (6'2, 286); 44 Leon Orr – (redshirt) junior (6'5, 310); 57 Caleb Brantley – Freshman (6'3, 304); 99 Jay-nard Bostwick – Freshman (6'4 291); Defensive Line (DE): 90 Jonathan Bullard – Sophomore (6'3, 270); 94 Bryan Cox Jr. – (redshirt) freshman (6'3 260); 95 Alex McCallister – (redshirt) freshman (6'6 238); 91 Joey Ivie – freshman (6'3 263); 17 Jordan Sherit – Freshman (6'5 234); 45 Antonio Riles – Freshman (6'4 286); 57 Dakota Wilson – (redshirt) sophomore; 97 Evan Holmes – (redshirt) sophomore	Buck: 6 Dante Fowler Jr. – sophomore (6'3 265); 7 Ronald Powell – (redshirt) junior (6'4 240); 95 Alex McCallister – (redshirt) freshman (6'6 238); Linebackers: 3 Antonio Morrison – sophomore; 7 Ronald Powell – (redshirt) junior; 11 Neiron Ball – (redshirt) junior; 49 Darrin Kitchens – senior; 51 Michael Taylor – (redshirt) junior; 13 Daniel McMillian – Freshman; 34 Alex Anzalone – freshman; 9 Matt Rolin – freshman; 40 Jarrad Davis – Freshman; 28 Jeremi Powell – (redshirt) freshman; 36 David Campbell – (redshirt) senior; 38 Samuel Nowakowski – (redshirt) freshman; 53 Cody Adams – (redshirt) sophomore; Defensive backs: 5 Marcus Roberson – junior; 15 Loucheiz Purifoy – junior; 14 Jaylen Watkins – senior; 1 Vernon Hargreaves III – Freshman; 24 Brian Poole – sophomore; 8 Jeremy Brown – (redshirt) senior; Safety: 31 Cody Riggs – (redshirt) junior; 20 Marcus Maye – (redshirt) freshman; 21 Jabari Gorman – junior; 22 Nick Washington – Freshman; 42 Keanu Neal – Freshman; 26 Marcell Harris – Freshman; 21 Evan Schroeder – (redshirt) sophomore; 22 Hugh Miles – (redshirt) sophomore; 27 Ben Peacock – (redshirt) sophomore; 30 Tim Clark – (redshirt) senior	Punters: 4 Kyle Christy – junior; 39 Todd Fennell – (redshirt) sophomore; 40 Justin Vogel – (redshirt) freshman; 42 Grant Van Aman – (redshirt) freshman; 19 Johnny Townsend – freshman; Kickers: 16 Austin Hardin – (redshirt) freshman; 95 Francisco Velez – (redshirt) junior; 97 Brad Phillips – senior; Long snappers: 43 Kyle Crofoot – (redshirt) sophomore; 46 Drew Ferris – (redshirt) junior

== Coaching staff ==
Name	Current responsibilities	Joined staff
Will Muschamp	Head coach	2011
Brent Pease	Offensive coordinator/quarterbacks	2012
D. J. Durkin	Defensive coordinator/linebackers	2010
Jeff Choate	Assistant head coach, outside linebackers/special teams	2013
Joker Phillips	Wide receivers/recruiting coordinator	2013
Brad Lawing	Assistant head coach/defensive line	2013
Tim Davis	Offensive line/running game coordinator	2012
Travaris Robinson	Defensive backs	2011
Brian White	Running backs	2009
Derek Lewis	Tight ends	2011

== Game summaries ==
=== Georgia Southern ===
Georgia Southern Eagles at Florida Gators – Game summary

Quarter	1	2	3	4	Total
Eagles	0	7	13	6	26
Gators	3	7	0	10	20

at Ben Hill Griffin Stadium, Gainesville, Florida

- Date: November 23
- Game time: 1:00 p.m. EST
- Game weather: Sunny, 81 °F (27 °C)
- Game attendance: 82,459
- Referee: Marc Curles
- TV: PPV
- Box score, Recap

Game information
First quarter
- FLA – Francisco Velez 27-yard field goal, 8:34. Gators 3–0. Drive: 13 plays, 63 yards, 6:26.

Second quarter

- FLA – Solomon Patton 3-yard pass from Skyler Mornhinweg (Francisco Velez kick), 13:31. Gators 10–0. Drive: 5 plays, 14 yards, 1:39.
- GASO – Kevin Ellison 45-yard run (Younghoe Koo kick), 2:01. Gators 10–7. Drive: 1 play, 45 yards, 0:10.

Third quarter

- GASO – Kevin Ellison 1-yard run (Younghoe Koo kick), 12:24. Eagles 14–10. Drive: 5 plays, 75 yards, 2:36.
- GASO – William Banks 3-yard run (kick failed), 0:32. Eagles 20–10. Drive: 8 plays, 49 yards, 4:02.

Fourth quarter

- FLA – Francisco Velez 22-yard field goal, 12:02. Eagles 20–13. Drive: 8 plays, 32 yards, 3:30.
- FLA – Solomon Patton 46-yard pass from Skyler Mornhinweg (Francisco Velez kick), 5:41. Tied 20–20. Drive: 3 plays, 59 yards, 1:04.
- GASO – Jerick McKinnon 14-yard run (kick failed), 2:57. Eagles 26–20. Drive: 5 plays, 75 yards, 2:44.

Statistics	GASO	FLA
First downs	16	15
Total yards	429	279
Rushing yards	429	157
Passing yards	0	122
Turnovers	2	0
Time of possession	30:23	29:37

Team	Category	Player	Statistics
Georgia Southern	Passing	Kevin Ellison	0/3, 0 yards
Georgia Southern	Rushing	Jerick McKinnon	9 rushes, 125 yards, TD
Georgia Southern	Receiving	None	
Florida	Passing	Skyler Mornhinweg	14/25, 122 yards, 2 TD
Florida	Rushing	Kelvin Taylor	22 rushes, 92 yards
Florida	Receiving	Solomon Patton	4 receptions, 69 yards, 2 TD

== Players drafted into the NFL ==
Round	Pick	Player	Position	NFL club
1	29	Dominique Easley	DT	New England Patriots
4	101	Jaylen Watkins	CB	Philadelphia Eagles
5	169	Ronald Powell	OLB	New Orleans Saints
6	179	Jon Halapio	G	New England Patriots
