= SEC TV =

Syndicated package of college sports telecasts

- Type: Live syndicated College sports
- Country: United States
- Headquarters: Charlotte, North Carolina
- Area: United States
- Parent: ESPN Inc.
- Launch date: September 5, 2009
- Dissolved: March 14, 2014
- Former names: SEC Network (2009–2013)
- Affiliates: (see Affiliates list)
- Official website: www.secdigitalnetwork.com

SEC TV (formerly SEC Network) was a syndicated package featuring live broadcasts of college football and basketball events from the Southeastern Conference. It was owned and operated by ESPN Regional Television and shown in more than 50 percent of households in the United States, mostly Southeastern United States markets. SEC TV's football games typically aired in the noon eastern slot that was former home to the Jefferson-Pilot/Raycom Sports SEC game of the week. Games were shown locally on broadcast stations, regional sports networks, as well as on ESPN GamePlan, ESPN Full Court, and WatchESPN.

SEC TV was replaced with a 24-hour cable network devoted to the conference, also named SEC Network, after the 2013–14 college sports season. The new SEC Network would assume the duty of broadcasting football games in the "early" window used by SEC TV.

== History ==
In 2008, ESPN reached a 15-year deal to become the Southeastern Conference's main media rightsholder, assuming the majority of football and basketball rights (besides portions that would still be held by CBS), including the syndicated package produced by Raycom Sports and its predecessors (which had broadcast SEC basketball games for 22 years, and football for 17). Besides games on its cable networks, ESPN chose to retain the syndicated package, moving it under its competing ESPN Regional Television (also previously known on-air as ESPN Plus) unit under the on-air brand SEC Network.

The first SEC Network game was the Tennessee Volunteers football team's 63–7 blowout win over the Western Kentucky Hilltoppers on September 5, 2009. Dave Neal (an original Jefferson-Pilot/Raycom play-by-play football commentator) and Andre Ware were the play-by-play commentators, and Cara Capuano was the sideline reporter. Unlike Jefferson-Pilot/Raycom Sports, SEC TV also carried some regular season Women's basketball games in syndication on Sunday afternoons during basketball season.

In 2013, with the announcement that ESPN would be launching an SEC cable network under the same name in 2014, SEC Network was re-branded as SEC TV on September 7, 2013. SEC TV folded following the 2013 football season and the 2013-2014 basketball season. The last live sports program to air on SEC TV was the quarterfinals of the 2014 men's conference basketball tournament. The standalone SEC Network cable outlet launched August 14 of that year.

SEC TV was available through 102 over-the-air television stations in the now-11-state SEC footprint, as well as other stations outside SEC markets, regional sports networks, and ESPN platforms such as ESPN3 and ESPN GamePlan/Full Court.

== On-air personalities ==
=== Play-by-play commentator ===
- Dave Neal (football and men's basketball, 2009–2014)
- Carter Blackburn (men's basketball, 2010–2012)
- Dave Baker (men's basketball, 2012–2014)

=== Color analysts ===
- Andre Ware (football, 2009–2013)
- Mark Gottfried (men's basketball, 2010–2011)
- Dave LaMont (men's basketball, 2012–2014)
- Clay Matvick (men's basketball, 2010–2013)

=== Sideline reporters ===
- Cara Capuano (football, 2009–2013)
- Kara Lawson (men's basketball, 2011–2013)
- Barry Booker (men's basketball, 2012–2014)
- Kyle Macy (men's basketball, 2012–2013)
- Joe Dean, Jr. (men's basketball, 2012–2014)

== Game schedules ==
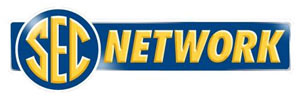
Previous logo as SEC Network used until 2013

=== 2009 SEC Network football schedule ===
- September 5 – Western Kentucky at Tennessee (TENN 63, WKU 7)
- September 12 – Troy at #1 Florida (FLA 56, Troy 6)
- September 19 – North Texas at #4 Alabama (ALA 53, UNT 7)
- September 26 – #7 LSU at Mississippi State (LSU 30, MSU 26)
- October 3 – #3 Alabama at Kentucky (ALA 38, UK 20)
- October 10 – Georgia at Tennessee (TENN 45, UGA 19)
- October 17 – Georgia at Vanderbilt (UGA 34, VAN 10)
- October 24 – Arkansas at Ole Miss (MISS 30, ARK 17)
- October 31 – #25 Ole Miss at Auburn (AUB 33, MISS 20)
- November 7 – South Carolina at Arkansas (ARK 33, USC 16)
- November 14 – Kentucky at Vanderbilt (UK 24, VAN 13)
- November 21 – Tennessee-Chattanooga at #2 Alabama (ALA 45, UTC 0) OR Mississippi State at Arkansas (ARK 42, MSU 21)
- November 28 – #20 Ole Miss at Mississippi State (MSU 41, MISS 27)

=== 2010 SEC Network football schedule ===
- September 4 – Louisiana-Lafayette at #23 Georgia (UGA 55, ULL 7)
- September 11 – South Florida at #8 Florida (FLA 38, USF 14)
- September 18 – Vanderbilt at Ole Miss (VAN 28, MISS 14)
- September 25 – Alabama-Birmingham at Tennessee (TENN 32, UAB 29 (2OT))
- October 2 – Kentucky at Ole Miss (MISS 42, UK 35)
- October 9 – Tennessee at Georgia (UGA 41, TENN 14)
- October 16 – Vanderbilt at Georgia (UGA 43, VAN 0)
- October 23 – Ole Miss at #21 Arkansas (ARK 38, MISS 24)
- October 30 – Tennessee at #17 South Carolina (USC 38, TENN 24)
- November 6 – Florida at Vanderbilt (FLA 55, VAN 14)
- November 13 – Vanderbilt at Kentucky (UK 38, VAN 20)
- November 20 – Troy at #17 South Carolina (USC 69, Troy 24)
- November 27 – Kentucky at Tennessee (TENN 24, UK 14)

=== 2011 SEC Network football schedule ===
- September 3 – Kent State at #2 Alabama (ALA 48, KSU 7)
- September 10 – #16 Mississippi State at Auburn (AUB 41, MSU 34)
- September 17 – Ole Miss at Vanderbilt (VAN 30, MISS 7)
- September 24 – Georgia at Ole Miss (UGA 27, MISS 13)
- October 1 – Kentucky at #1 LSU (LSU 35, UK 7)
- October 8 – Kentucky at #18 South Carolina (USC 54, UK 3)
- October 15 – #15 South Carolina at Mississippi State (USC 14, MSU 12)
- October 22 – #10 Arkansas at Ole Miss (ARK 29, MISS 24)
- October 29 – #8 Arkansas at Vanderbilt (ARK 31, VAN 28)
- November 5 – Vanderbilt at Florida (FLA 26, VAN 21)
- November 12 – Kentucky at Vanderbilt (VAN 38, UK 8)
- November 19 – Kentucky at #13 Georgia (UGA 19, UK 10)
- November 26 – Tennessee at Kentucky (UK 10, TENN 7)

=== 2012 SEC Network football schedule ===
All times listed are ET

- September 1 – Noon – Buffalo at #6 Georgia (UGA 45, BUFF 23)
- September 8 – Noon – East Carolina at #9 South Carolina (USC 48, ECU 10)
- September 8 – 3:30 pm – Western Kentucky at #1 Alabama (ALA 35, WKU 0)
- September 15 – Noon – Louisiana-Monroe at Auburn (AUB 31, ULM 28)
- September 22 – Noon – Kentucky at #14 Florida (FLA 38, UK 0)
- September 29 – Noon – Arkansas at Texas A&M (TAMU 58, ARK 10)
- October 6 – Noon – #20 Mississippi State at Kentucky (MSU 27, UK 14)
- October 13 – Noon – Auburn at Ole Miss (MISS 41, AUB 20)
- October 20 – Noon – Auburn at Vanderbilt (VAN 17, AUB 13)
- October 27 – Noon – Ole Miss at Arkansas (MISS 30, ARK 27)
- November 3 – Noon – Tulsa at Arkansas (ARK 19, TUL 15)
- November 10 – Noon – Louisiana-Lafayette at #6 Florida (FLA 27, ULL 20) OR Missouri at Tennessee (MIZZ 51, TENN 48 (4OT))
- November 17 – Noon – Western Carolina at #4 Alabama (ALA 49, WCU 0) OR Arkansas at Mississippi State (MSU 45, ARK 10)
- November 24 – Noon – Kentucky at Tennessee (TENN 37, UK 17)

=== 2013 SEC TV football schedule ===
All times listed are ET

- August 31 – 12:21 pm – Toledo at #10 Florida (FLA 24, TOL 6)
- September 7 – 12:21 pm – Western Kentucky at Tennessee (TEN 52, WKU 20)
- September 14 – 12:21 pm – Southern Miss at Arkansas (ARK 24, USM 3)
- September 21 – 12:21 pm – North Texas at #9 Georgia (UGA 45, UNT 21)
- September 28 – 12:21 pm – South Alabama at Tennessee (TEN 31, USA 24)
- October 5 – 12:21 pm – Georgia State at #1 Alabama (ALA 45, GST 3)
- October 12 – 12:21 pm – South Carolina at Arkansas (USC 52, ARK 7)
- October 19 – 12:21 pm – #22 Florida at #14 Missouri (MIZZ 36, FLA 17)
- October 26 – 12:21 pm – Vanderbilt at #14 Texas A&M (TEXAS A&M 56, VANDY 24)
- November 2– 12:21 pm – Mississippi State at #14 South Carolina (USC 34, MSU 16)
- November 9 – 12:21 pm – Arkansas at Ole Miss (OLE MISS 34, ARK 24)
- November 16 – 12:21 pm – Kentucky at Vanderbilt (VANDY 22, UK 6)
- November 23 – 12:21 pm – Mississippi State at Arkansas (MSU 24, ARK 17 (OT))
- November 30 – 12:21 pm – Wake Forest at Vanderbilt (VANDY 23, WAKE 21)

== Affiliates ==
Most affiliates alternated each season, depending on the sport. Many stations outside of the SEC's geographical footprint only carried SEC TV's football games, but most others, especially within the SEC footprint, also aired men's and women's basketball games offered in the sports package. Markets without an SEC TV broadcast partner accessed the broadcasts via Regional sports networks.

== See also ==
- ESPN College Football
- ESPN College Basketball

Preceded by Raycom Sports	Syndication Rightsholder to the Southeastern Conference; 2009-2014	Succeeded by SEC Network (cable-only)
