= 2013 Arkansas Razorbacks football team =

American college football season

2013 Arkansas Razorbacks football
- Conference: Southeastern Conference
- Western Division
- Record: 3–9 (0–8 SEC)
- Head coach: Bret Bielema (1st season)
- Offensive coordinator: Jim Chaney (1st season)
- Offensive scheme: Pro-style
- Defensive coordinator: Chris Ash (1st season)
- Base defense: 4–3
- Captains: Kiero Small; Travis Swanson; Chris Smith; Robert Thomas
- Home stadium: Donald W. Reynolds Razorback Stadium; War Memorial Stadium

2013 Southeastern Conference football standings
	Conf.			Overall
Team	W		L	W		L
Eastern Division
No. 5 Missouri x	7	–	1	12	–	2
No. 4 South Carolina	6	–	2	11	–	2
Georgia	5	–	3	8	–	5
No. 24 Vanderbilt	4	–	4	9	–	4
Florida	3	–	5	4	–	8
Tennessee	2	–	6	5	–	7
Kentucky	0	–	8	2	–	10
Western Division
No. 2 Auburn xy$	7	–	1	12	–	2
No. 7 Alabama x%	7	–	1	11	–	2
No. 14 LSU *	5	–	3	10	–	3
No. 18 Texas A&M	4	–	4	9	–	4
Mississippi State	3	–	5	7	–	6
Ole Miss *	3	–	5	8	–	5
Arkansas	0	–	8	3	–	9
Championship: Auburn 59, Missouri 42
$ – BCS representative as conference champion; % – BCS at-large representative; x – Division champion/co-champions; y – Championship game participant; * LSU and Ole Miss vacated all wins (except for Ole Miss' Music City Bowl win) due to NCAA violations.; Rankings from AP Poll

The 2013 Arkansas Razorbacks football team represented the University of Arkansas as a member of the Southeastern Conference (SEC) during the 2013 NCAA Division I FBS football season. Led by first-year head coach Bret Bielema, the Razorbacks compiled an overall record of 3–9 with a mark of 0–8 in conference play, placing last out of seven teams in the SEC's Western Division. The team played five home games at Donald W. Reynolds Razorback Stadium in Fayetteville, Arkansas and two home games at War Memorial Stadium in Little Rock, Arkansas.

== Schedule ==
Date	Time	Opponent	Site	TV	Result	Attendance
August 31	3:00 pm	Louisiana–Lafayette*	Donald W. Reynolds Razorback Stadium; Fayetteville, AR	SECRN	W 34–14	69,801
September 7	6:00 pm	Samford*	War Memorial Stadium; Little Rock, AR	PPV	W 31–21	47,358
September 14	11:21 am	Southern Miss*	Donald W. Reynolds Razorback Stadium; Fayetteville, AR	SECTV	W 24–3	63,067
September 21	2:30 pm	at Rutgers*	High Point Solutions Stadium; Piscataway, NJ	ESPN	L 24–28	51,969
September 28	6:00 pm	No. 10 Texas A&M	Donald W. Reynolds Razorback Stadium; Fayetteville, AR (rivalry)	ESPN2	L 33–45	72,613
October 5	6:00 pm	at No. 18 Florida	Ben Hill Griffin Stadium; Gainesville, FL	ESPN2	L 10–30	90,043
October 12	11:21 am	No. 14 South Carolina	Donald W. Reynolds Razorback Stadium; Fayetteville, AR	SECTV	L 7–52	66,302
October 19	6:00 pm	at No. 1 Alabama	Bryant–Denny Stadium; Tuscaloosa, AL	ESPN	L 0–52	101,821
November 2	5:00 pm	No. 11 Auburn^{†}	Donald W. Reynolds Razorback Stadium; Fayetteville, AR	ESPN2	L 17–35	66,835
November 9	11:21 am	at Ole Miss	Vaught–Hemingway Stadium; Oxford, MS (rivalry)	SECTV	L 24–34	60,856
November 23	11:21 am	Mississippi State	War Memorial Stadium; Little Rock, AR	SECTV	L 17–24 ^{OT}	45,198
November 29	1:30 pm	at No. 17 LSU	Tiger Stadium; Baton Rouge, LA (rivalry)	CBS	L 27–31	89,656
*Non-conference game; ^{†}Homecoming; Rankings from AP Poll released prior to the game; All times are in Central time

== Rankings ==
Ranking movements Legend: ██ Increase in ranking ██ Decrease in ranking — = Not ranked RV = Received votes
	Week																
Poll	Pre	1	2	3	4	5	6	7	8	9	10	11	12	13	14	15	Final
AP	—	RV	—	RV	—	—	—	—	—	—	—	—	—	—	—	—	—
Coaches	RV	RV	RV	RV	—	—	—	—	—	—	—	—	—	—	—	—	—
Harris	Not released							—	—	—	—	—	—	—	—	—	Not released
BCS	Not released								—	—	—	—	—	—	—	—	Not released

== Preseason ==
Bret Bielema was hired as Arkansas's head football coach on December 4, leaving the same position with the Wisconsin Badgers. The move surprised many, including Wisconsin athletic director Barry Alvarez. It was announced Wisconsin defensive coordinator Chris Ash would take the same position at Arkansas on December 11.

== Game summaries ==
=== Louisiana–Lafayette ===
	1	2	3	4	Total
Ragin' Cajuns	0	7	7	0	14
Razorbacks	7	13	14	0	34

- (Q1, 8:24) ARK – Javontee Herndon 6-yard pass from Brandon Allen, Zach Hocker kick
- (Q2, 13:58) ULL – Alonzo Harris 2-yard rush, Stephen Brauchle kick
- (Q2, 11:30) ARK – Javontee Herndon 49-yard pass from Brandon Allen, Zach Hocker kick
- (Q2, 5:18) ARK – Zach Hocker 22-yard field goal
- (Q2, 0:00) ARK – Zach Hocker 34-yard field goal
- (Q3, 8:39) ARK – Kiero Small 10-yard pass from Brandon Allen, Zach Hocker kick
- (Q3, 6:20) ULL – Jacob Maxwell 11-yard pass from Terrance Broadway, Stephen Brauchle kick
- (Q3, 6:04) ARK – Jonathan Williams 75-yard rush, Zach Hocker kick

=== Samford ===
	1	2	3	4	Total
Bulldogs	7	0	14	0	21
Razorbacks	14	3	0	14	31

- (Q1, 12:02) ARK – Mitchell Loewen 24-yard pass from Brandon Allen, Zach Hocker kick
- (Q1, 7:36) ARK – Javontee Herndon 7-yard pass from Brandon Allen, Zach Hocker kick
- (Q1, 1:36) SAM – Kelsey Pope 2-yard rush, Warren Handrahan kick
- (Q2, 11:54) ARK – Zach Hocker 54-yard field goal
- (Q3, 11:22) SAM – Zeke Walters 2-yard pass from Andy Summerlin, Warren Handrahan kick
- (Q3, 5:09) SAM – Fabian Truss 16-yard rush, Warren Handrahan kick
- (Q4, 13:38) ARK – Jonathan Williams 1-yard rush, Zach Hocker kick
- (Q4, 9:04) ARK – Alex Collins 2-yard rush, Zach Hocker kick

=== Southern Miss ===
	1	2	3	4	Total
Golden Eagles	0	3	0	0	3
Razorbacks	7	3	7	7	24

- (Q1, 3:52) ARK – Brandon Allen 5-yard rush, Zach Hocker kick
- (Q2, 12:01) USM – Corey Acosta 27-yard field goal
- (Q2, 6:05) ARK – Zach Hocker 42-yard field goal
- (Q3, 7:29) ARK – Jonathan Williams 45-yard rush, Zach Hocker kick
- (Q4, 7:20) ARK – Alex Collins 7-yard rush, Zach Hocker kick

=== At Rutgers ===
	1	2	3	4	Total
Razorbacks	10	0	14	0	24
Scarlet Knights	0	7	7	14	28

- (Q1, 1:51) ARK – Zach Hocker 41-yard field goal
- (Q1, 0:21) ARK – Tevin Mitchel 26-yard interception return, Zach Hocker kick
- (Q2, 0:39) RUTG – Tyler Kroft 15-yard pass from Gary Nova, Nick Borgese kick
- (Q3, 10:01) ARK – Javontee Herndon 17-yard pass from A.J. Derby, Zach Hocker kick
- (Q3, 8:38) ARK – Hunter Henry 21-yard pass from Jonathan Williams, Zach Hocker kick
- (Q3, 2:14) RUTG – Janarion Grant 58-yard punt return, Nick Borgese kick
- (Q4, 9:55) RUTG – Leonte Carroo 33-yard pass from Gary Nova, Nick Borgese kick
- (Q4, 5:18) RUTG – Leonte Carroo 4-yard pass from Gary Nova, Nick Borgese kick

=== Vs. No. 10 Texas A&M ===
	1	2	3	4	Total
No. 10 Aggies	17	7	14	7	45
Razorbacks	7	13	13	0	33

- (Q1, 12:21) A&M – Mike Evans 9-yard pass from Johnny Manziel, Josh Lambo kick
- (Q1, 7:43) ARK – Keon Hatcher 12-yard pass from Brandon Allen, Zach Hocker kick
- (Q1, 5:11) A&M – Ben Malena 2-yard rush, Josh Lambo kick
- (Q1, 1:47) A&M – Josh Lambo 39-yard field goal
- (Q2, 14:44) ARK – Zach Hocker 28-yard field goal
- (Q2, 11:14) A&M – Mike Evans 7-yard pass from Johnny Manziel, Josh Lambo kick
- (Q2, 6:02) ARK – Jonathan Williams 19-yard pass from Brandon Allen, Zach Hocker kick
- (Q2, 0:00) ARK – Zach Hocker 39-yard field goal
- (Q3, 14:19) A&M – Deshazor Everett 34-yard interception return, Josh Lambo kick
- (Q3, 12:43) ARK – Alex Collins 9-yard rush, Zach Hocker kick
- (Q3, 4:42) A&M – Trey Williams 17-yard rush, Josh Lambo kick
- (Q3, 1:09) ARK – Javontee Herndon 19-yard pass from Brandon Allen
- (Q4, 10:08) A&M – Ben Malena 1-yard rush, Josh Lambo kick

=== At No. 18 Florida ===
	1	2	3	4	Total
Razorbacks	7	0	3	0	10
No. 18 Florida	0	17	7	6	30

- (Q1, 2:09) ARK – Jonathan Williams 4-yard rush, Zach Hocker kick
- (Q2, 11:11) FLA – Brad Phillips 28-yard field goal
- (Q2, 8:33) FLA – Loucheiz Purifoy 42-yard interception return, Brad Phillips kick
- (Q2, 0:20) FLA – Solomon Patton 51-yard pass from Tyler Murphy, Brad Phillips kick
- (Q3, 11:23) FLA – Solomon Patton 38-yard pass from Tyler Murphy, Brad Phillips kick
- (Q3, 4:12) ARK – Zach Hocker 30-yard field goal
- (Q4, 4:47) FLA – Valdez Showers 9-yard pass from Tyler Murphy

=== No. 14 South Carolina ===
	1	2	3	4	Total
No. 14 Gamecocks	10	14	14	14	52
Razorbacks	7	0	0	0	7

- (Q1, 12:02) ARK – Alex Collins 6-yard rush, Zach Hocker kick
- (Q1, 7:14) SC – Elliot Fry 33-yard field goal
- (Q1, 5:12) SC – Mike Davis 6-yard rush, Elliot Fry kick
- (Q2, 13:40) SC – Bruce Ellington 9-yard pass from Connor Shaw, Elliot Fry kick
- (Q2, 0:13) SC – Bruce Ellington 4-yard pass from Connor Shaw, Elliot Fry kick
- (Q3, 11:49) SC – Damiere Byrd 45-yard pass from Connor Shaw, Elliot Fry
- (Q3, 1:29) SC – Connor Shaw 10-yard rush, Elliot Fry kick
- (Q4, 9:18) SC – Kane Whitehurst 15-yard pass from Dylan Thompson, Elliot Fry kick
- (Q4, 1:07) SC – Brendan Nosovitch 7-yard rush, Elliot Fry kick

=== At No. 1 Alabama ===
	1	2	3	4	Total
Razorbacks	0	0	0	0	0
No. 1 Crimson Tide	14	14	17	7	52

- (Q1, 9:09) BAMA – Jalston Fowler 4-yard pass from A.J. McCarron, Cade Foster kick
- (Q1, 4:36) BAMA – Kenyan Drake 1-yard rush, Cade Foster kick
- (Q2, 9:03) BAMA – Kenyan Drake 46-yard rush, Cade Foster kick
- (Q2, 1:07) BAMA – Amari Cooper 30-yard pass from A.J. McCarron, Cade Foster kick
- (Q3, 13:28) BAMA – O. J. Howard 17-yard pass from A.J. McCarron, Cade Foster kick
- (Q3, 8:18) BAMA – T. J. Yeldon 24-yard rush, Cade Foster kick
- (Q3, 3:02) BAMA – Cade Foster 48-yard field goal
- (Q4, 0:59) BAMA – Derrick Henry 80-yard rush, Adam Griffith kick

=== No. 8 Auburn ===
	1	2	3	4	Total
No. 8 Tigers	7	7	14	7	35
Razorbacks	0	3	7	7	17

- (Q1, 2:35) AUB – Tre Mason 9-yard rush, Cody Parkey kick
- (Q2, 12:52) ARK – Zach Hocker 34-yard field goal
- (Q2, 10:53) AUB – Tre Mason 4-yard rush, Cody Parkey kick
- (Q3, 10:52) AUB – Tre Mason 5-yard rush, Cody Parkey kick
- (Q3, 6:39) AUB – Sammie Coates 88-yard pass from Nick Marshall, Cody Parkey kick
- (Q3, 6:11) ARK – Keon Hatcher 13-yard pass from Brandon Allen, Zach Hocker kick
- (Q4, 14:54) ARK – Kiero Small 2-yard rush, Zach Hocker kick
- (Q4, 10:17) AUB – Tre Mason 12-yard rush, Cody Parkey kick

=== At Ole Miss ===
	1	2	3	4	Total
Razorbacks	3	7	7	7	24
Rebels	10	10	14	0	34

- (Q1, 12:14) ARK – Zach Hocker 51-yard field goal
- (Q1, 8:24) MISS – Andrew Ritter 42-yard field goal
- (Q1, 1:28) MISS – Barry Brunetti 1-yard rush, Andrew Ritter kick
- (Q2, 10:18) MISS – Andrew Ritter 19-yard field goal
- (Q2, 2:43) ARK – Hunter Henry 17-yard pass from Brandon Allen, Zach Hocker kick
- (Q2, 0:42) MISS – Laquon Treadwell 14-yard pass from Bo Wallace, Andrew Ritter kick
- (Q3, 11:29) ARK – Kiero Small 1-yard rush, Zach Hocker kick
- (Q3, 4:11) MISS – Ja-Mes Logan 75-yard pass from Bo Wallace, Andrew Ritter kick
- (Q3, 1:05) MISS – Donte Moncrief 52-yard pass from Bo Wallace, Andrew Ritter kick
- (Q4, 4:57) ARK – Julian Horton 20-yard pass from Brandon Allen, Zach Hocker kick

=== Mississippi State ===
	1	2	3	4	OT	Total
Bulldogs	0	10	0	7	7	24
Razorbacks	7	3	7	0	0	17

- (Q1, 11:02) ARK – Javontee Herndon 8-yard rush, Zach Hocker kick
- (Q2, 6:53) ARK – Zach Hocker 54-yard field goal
- (Q2, 5:08) MSST – Devon Bell 24-yard field goal
- (Q2, 1:48) MSST – Ladarius Perkins 30-yard pass from Tyler Russell, Devon Bell kick
- (Q3, 3:28) ARK – Julian Horton 22-yard rush, Zach Hocker kick
- (Q4, 13:35) MSST – Jameon Lewis 5-yard pass from Tyler Russell, Devon Bell kick
- (OT) MSST – Damian Williams 25-yard rush, Devon Bell kick

=== At No. 15 LSU ===
	1	2	3	4	Total
Razorbacks	7	10	10	0	27
No. 15 Tigers	14	0	7	10	31

- (Q1, 11:15) LSU – Terrence Magee 29-yard rush, Colby Delahoussaye kick
- (Q1, 6:26) ARK – Kiero Small 3-yard rush, Zach Hocker kick
- (Q1, 3:38) LSU – Terrence Magee 23-yard rush, Colby Delahoussaye kick
- (Q2, 6:14) ARK – Hunter Henry 9-yard pass from Brandon Allen, Zach Hocker kick
- (Q2, 0:00) ARK – Zach Hocker 20-yard field goal
- (Q3, 9:27) ARK – Zach Hocker 28-yard field goal
- (Q3, 7:35) LSU – Jeremy Hill 52-yard rush, Colby Delahoussaye kick
- (Q3, 0:50) ARK – Hunter Henry 2-yard pass from Brandon Allen, Zach Hocker kick
- (Q4, 4:56) LSU – Colby Delahoussaye 37-yard field goal
- (Q4, 1:15) LSU – Travin Dural 49-yard pass from Anthony Jennings, Colby Delahoussaye kick
