= 2013 South Carolina Gamecocks football team =

American college football season

2013 South Carolina Gamecocks football

Palmetto Bowl champion

Capital One Bowl, W 34–24 vs. Wisconsin
- Conference: Southeastern Conference
- East Division

Ranking
- Coaches: No. 4
- AP: No. 4
- Record: 11–2 (6–2 SEC)
- Head coach: Steve Spurrier (9th season)
- Co-offensive coordinators: Steve Spurrier Jr. (2nd season); Shawn Elliot (2nd season)
- Offensive scheme: Fun and gun
- Defensive coordinator: Lorenzo Ward (2nd season)
- Base defense: 4–2–5
- Home stadium: Williams-Brice Stadium

2013 Southeastern Conference football standings
	Conf.			Overall
Team	W		L	W		L
Eastern Division
No. 5 Missouri x	7	–	1	12	–	2
No. 4 South Carolina	6	–	2	11	–	2
Georgia	5	–	3	8	–	5
No. 24 Vanderbilt	4	–	4	9	–	4
Florida	3	–	5	4	–	8
Tennessee	2	–	6	5	–	7
Kentucky	0	–	8	2	–	10
Western Division
No. 2 Auburn xy$	7	–	1	12	–	2
No. 7 Alabama x%	7	–	1	11	–	2
No. 14 LSU *	5	–	3	10	–	3
No. 18 Texas A&M	4	–	4	9	–	4
Mississippi State	3	–	5	7	–	6
Ole Miss *	3	–	5	8	–	5
Arkansas	0	–	8	3	–	9
Championship: Auburn 59, Missouri 42
$ – BCS representative as conference champion; % – BCS at-large representative; x – Division champion/co-champions; y – Championship game participant; * LSU and Ole Miss vacated all wins (except for Ole Miss' Music City Bowl win) due to NCAA violations.; Rankings from AP Poll

The 2013 South Carolina Gamecocks football team represented the University of South Carolina in the 2013 NCAA Division I FBS football season. The Gamecocks competed as a member of the Southeastern Conference (SEC) as part of its East Division. The team was led by head coach Steve Spurrier, in his ninth year, and played its home games at Williams–Brice Stadium in Columbia, South Carolina.

Entering the season, the Gamecocks had lost a school-record thirteen players to the last two NFL drafts, but returned several key players such as senior quarterback Connor Shaw, defensive sensation Jadeveon Clowney, wide receiver Bruce Ellington, and running back Mike Davis. South Carolina started highly ranked, like the previous two seasons, but lost an early contest on the road at No. 11 Georgia, the program's first loss to the Bulldogs since 2009. The Gamecocks won their next four games but then stumbled again, losing on the road to unranked Tennessee, the program's first loss to an unranked team since 2011. They subsequently fell to No. 20 in the country, their lowest ranking since 2010.

However, South Carolina had its best finish to a season in program history. On the road at undefeated No. 5 Missouri, the Gamecocks started 0–17. An injured Connor Shaw subsequently came in to replace Dylan Thompson, and engineered a 17-point comeback in the fourth quarter to send the game to overtime. South Carolina won in double overtime after Missouri's kicker missed a field goal, giving the Gamecocks the first overtime victory in school history, known since as the "Miracle at Mizzou". The Gamecocks won the next three games at home against unranked teams, climbing back into the top ten. In the highest-ranked Palmetto Bowl ever, South Carolina beat No. 6 Clemson at home, a school-record fifth consecutive victory against the Tigers. Connor Shaw won his final home game, finishing 17–0 at Williams–Brice Stadium. South Carolina was invited to play No. 19 Wisconsin in the Capital One Bowl to end the season. The Gamecocks defeated the Badgers, with Shaw scoring all five of his team's touchdowns in the final game of his college career. South Carolina finished with eleven wins, becoming only the twelfth team in college football history to win eleven games in three straight seasons. The Gamecocks finished the season ranked No. 4, which remains the highest final ranking in school history.

The 2013 Gamecocks had statistically the best offense in school history, averaging 34.1 points and a school-record 452.3 yards per game. Connor Shaw was a semifinalist for the Davey O'Brien Award, while Mike Davis had the fourth highest single-season rushing total in school history.

== Schedule ==
Date	Time	Opponent	Rank	Site	TV	Result	Attendance
August 29	6:00 pm	North Carolina*	No. 6	Williams-Brice Stadium; Columbia, SC	ESPN	W 27–10	81,572
September 7	4:30 pm	at No. 11 Georgia	No. 6	Sanford Stadium; Athens, GA (rivalry)	ESPN	L 30–41	92,746
September 14	7:00 pm	Vanderbilt	No. 12	Williams-Brice Stadium; Columbia, SC	ESPN	W 35–25	81,371
September 28	12:00 pm	at UCF*	No. 12	Bright House Networks Stadium; Orlando, FL	ABC	W 28–25	47,605
October 5	7:30 pm	Kentucky	No. 13	Williams-Brice Stadium; Columbia, SC	SECRN	W 35–28	82,313
October 12	12:21 pm	at Arkansas	No. 14	Donald W. Reynolds Razorback Stadium; Fayetteville, AR	SECTV	W 52–7	66,302
October 19	12:00 pm	at Tennessee	No. 11	Neyland Stadium; Knoxville, TN (rivalry)	ESPN	L 21–23	95,736
October 26	7:00 pm	at No. 5 Missouri	No. 20	Faurot Field; Columbia, MO (Mayor's Cup)	ESPN	W 27–24 ^{2OT}	67,124
November 2	12:21 pm	Mississippi State^{†}	No. 14	Williams-Brice Stadium; Columbia, SC	SECTV	W 34–16	82,111
November 16	7:00 pm	Florida	No. 11	Williams-Brice Stadium; Columbia, SC	ESPN2	W 19–14	83,853
November 23	1:00 pm	No. 11 (FCS) Coastal Carolina*	No. 12	Williams-Brice Stadium; Columbia, SC	PPV	W 70–10	81,411
November 30	7:00 pm	No. 6 Clemson*	No. 10	Williams-Brice Stadium; Columbia, SC (Palmetto Bowl)	ESPN2	W 31–17	84,174
January 1, 2014	1:00 pm	vs. No. 19 Wisconsin*	No. 8	Florida Citrus Bowl Stadium; Orlando, FL (Capital One Bowl)	ABC	W 34–24	56,629
*Non-conference game; ^{†}Homecoming; Rankings from AP Poll released prior to the game; All times are in Eastern time

== Players ==
=== Depth chart ===
Projected starters and primary backups versus Mississippi State on November 2, 2013.

Defense

FS
Chaz Elder
T.J. Gurley

WLB	MLB	SLB
⋅	Marquis Roberts	⋅
Kaiwan Lewis	Skai Moore	⋅

SS
Brison Williams
Kadetrix Marcus

CB
Victor Hampton (American football)
Ahmad Christian

DE	DT	DT	DE
Chaz Sutton	J.T. Surratt	Kelcy Quarles	Jadeveon Clowney
Gerald Dixon	Gerald Dixon, Jr.	Phillip Dukes	Darius English

CB
Jimmy Legree
Rico McWilliams

Offense

WR
Damiere Byrd
Nick Jones

LT	LG	C	RG	RT
Corey Robinson (offensive tackle)	A.J. Cann	Cody Waldrop	Ronald Patrick	Brandon Shell
Mason Zandi	Brock Stadnik	Clayton Stadnik	Will Sport	Cody Gibson

TE
Rory Anderson
Jerell Adams

WR
Bruce Ellington
Shaq Roland

QB
Connor Shaw
Dylan Thompson

Key reserves
WR Pharoh Cooper
WR Shamier Jeffery
WR K.J. Brent
WR Kane Whitehurst
TE Mason Zandi
DE Mason Harris
LB Jonathan Walton
LB Cedrick Cooper

RB
Mike Davis
Shon Carson

FB
Connor McLaurin
Jordan Diaz

Special teams
PK Elliot Fry
P Tyler Hull
KR Pharoh Cooper
PR Pharoh Cooper
LS Drew Williams
H Patrick Fish

=== Awards ===
- A.J. Cann – SEC Offensive Lineman of the Week, 9/30/13
- Mike Davis – AgSouth Athlete of the Week, 9/30/13
- Elliott Fry – SEC Special Teams Player of the Week, 10/28/13; SEC Freshman of the Week, 11/18/13
- Victor Hampton – SEC Defensive Player of the Week, 11/4/13
- Kelcy Quarles – SEC Defensive Lineman of the Week, 10/28/13
- Connor Shaw – AgSouth Athlete of the Week, 9/16/13; AgSouth Athlete of the Week, 10/28/13; Davey O'Brien Quarterback of the Week, 10/28/13; SEC Offensive Player of the Week, 10/28/13
- Clayton Stadnik – SEC Offensive Lineman of the Week, 9/16/13

== Game summaries ==
=== North Carolina ===
	1	2	3	4	Total
Tar Heels	0	7	3	0	10
#6 Gamecocks	17	3	7	0	27

=== Georgia ===
	1	2	3	4	Total
#6 Gamecocks	3	21	0	6	30
#11 Bulldogs	10	14	10	7	41

=== Vanderbilt ===
	1	2	3	4	Total
Commodores	0	10	0	15	25
#12 Gamecocks	21	7	7	0	35

=== UCF ===
	1	2	3	4	Total
#12 Gamecocks	0	0	14	14	28
Knights	7	3	0	15	25

=== Kentucky ===
	1	2	3	4	Total
Wildcats	0	7	0	21	28
#13 Gamecocks	14	10	3	8	35

=== Arkansas ===
	1	2	3	4	Total
#14 Gamecocks	10	14	14	14	52
Razorbacks	7	0	0	0	7

=== Tennessee ===
	1	2	3	4	Total
#11 Gamecocks	0	7	14	0	21
Volunteers	3	14	0	6	23

=== Missouri ===
	1	2	3	4	OT	2OT	Total
#20 Gamecocks	0	0	0	17	7	3	27
#5 Tigers	7	7	3	0	7	0	24

=== Mississippi State ===
	1	2	3	4	Total
Bulldogs	7	3	0	6	16
#14 Gamecocks	14	3	17	0	34

=== Florida ===
	1	2	3	4	Total
Gators	7	7	0	0	14
#11 Gamecocks	3	3	7	6	19

=== Coastal Carolina ===
	1	2	3	4	Total
Chanticleers	0	7	0	3	10
#12 Gamecocks	28	14	21	7	70

=== Clemson ===
	1	2	3	4	Total
#6 Tigers	7	3	7	0	17
#10 Gamecocks	7	10	0	14	31

=== Wisconsin (Capital One Bowl) ===
	1	2	3	4	Total
#19 Badgers	0	14	3	7	24
#8 Gamecocks	7	6	7	14	34

== Rankings ==
Ranking movements Legend: ██ Increase in ranking ██ Decrease in ranking
	Week																
Poll	Pre	1	2	3	4	5	6	7	8	9	10	11	12	13	14	15	Final
AP	6	6	13	12	12	13	14	11	20	14	13	11	12	10	8	8	4
Coaches	7	6	14	13	13	12	12	9	20	16	15	12	11	9	7	8	4
Harris	Not released							11	20	17	15	12	12	10	8	8	Not released
BCS	Not released								21	14	12	10	11	10	8	9	Not released

== Coaching staff ==
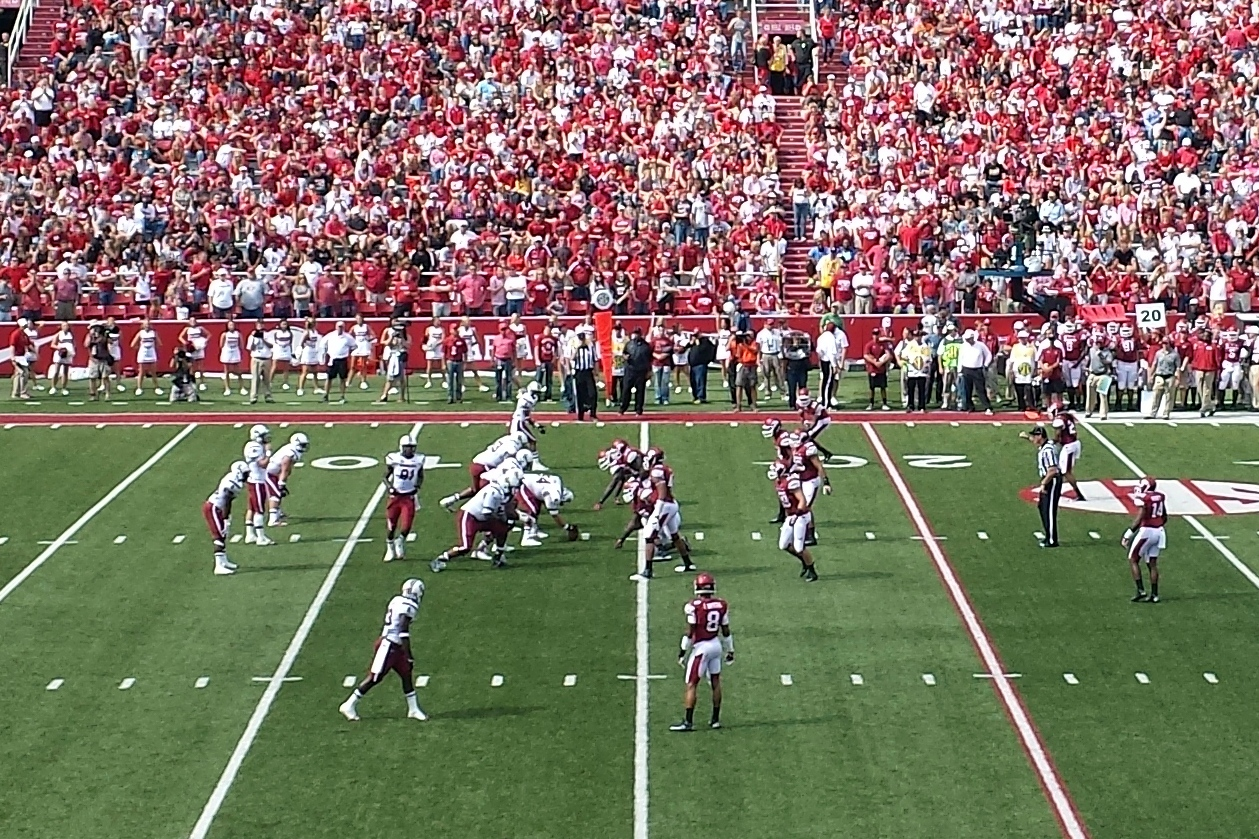
South Carolina Gamecocks offense (in white) prepares to snap the ball against the Arkansas Razorbacks defense

- Steve Spurrier – Head coach
- Lorenzo Ward – Defensive coordinator
- Deke Adams – Defensive line coach
- Kirk Botkin – Linebackers, spurs coach
- Grady Brown – Secondary coach, assistant special teams coordinator
- Shawn Elliott – Co-offensive coordinator, offensive line coach
- G. A. Mangus – Quarterbacks coach
- Joe Robinson – Special teams coordinator, tight ends coach
- Everette Sands – Running backs coach
- Steve Spurrier, Jr. – Recruiting coordinator, wide receivers coach
