= 2013 Ole Miss Rebels football team =

College football season

2013 Ole Miss Rebels football

Music City Bowl champion

Music City Bowl, W 25–17 vs. Georgia Tech
- Conference: Southeastern Conference
- Western Division
- Record: 1–5, 7 wins vacated (0–5 SEC, 3 wins vacated)
- Head coach: Hugh Freeze (2nd season)
- Co-offensive coordinators: Matt Luke (2nd season); Dan Werner (4th season)
- Offensive scheme: Spread
- Co-defensive coordinators: Dave Wommack (2nd season); Jason Jones (1st season)
- Base defense: 4–2–5
- Home stadium: Vaught–Hemingway Stadium

2013 Southeastern Conference football standings
	Conf.			Overall
Team	W		L	W		L
Eastern Division
No. 5 Missouri x	7	–	1	12	–	2
No. 4 South Carolina	6	–	2	11	–	2
Georgia	5	–	3	8	–	5
No. 24 Vanderbilt	4	–	4	9	–	4
Florida	3	–	5	4	–	8
Tennessee	2	–	6	5	–	7
Kentucky	0	–	8	2	–	10
Western Division
No. 2 Auburn xy$	7	–	1	12	–	2
No. 7 Alabama x%	7	–	1	11	–	2
No. 14 LSU *	5	–	3	10	–	3
No. 18 Texas A&M	4	–	4	9	–	4
Mississippi State	3	–	5	7	–	6
Ole Miss *	3	–	5	8	–	5
Arkansas	0	–	8	3	–	9
Championship: Auburn 59, Missouri 42
$ – BCS representative as conference champion; % – BCS at-large representative; x – Division champion/co-champions; y – Championship game participant; * LSU and Ole Miss vacated all wins (except for Ole Miss' Music City Bowl win) due to NCAA violations.; Rankings from AP Poll

The 2013 Ole Miss Rebels football team represented the University of Mississippi in the 2013 NCAA Division I FBS football season. The team was coached by Hugh Freeze, who was in his second season with Ole Miss. The Rebels played their home games at Vaught–Hemingway Stadium in Oxford, Mississippi, and competed in the Western Division of the Southeastern Conference (SEC).

== Personnel ==
=== Coaching staff ===
Name	Position	Year at Ole Miss	Alma mater (Year)
Hugh Freeze	Head Coach	2nd	Southern Miss (1992)
Matt Luke	Co-Offensive Coordinator/Offensive Line	2nd	Ole Miss (2000)
Dan Werner	Co-Offensive Coordinator/Quarterbacks	2nd	Western Michigan (1983)
Jason Jones	Co-Defensive Coordinator/Cornerbacks	1st	Alabama (2001)
Dave Wommack	Defensive Coordinator/Safeties	2nd	Missouri Southern State (1978)
Tom Allen	Special Teams Coordinator/Linebackers	2nd	Maranatha Baptist (1992)
Chris Kiffin	Defensive Line/Recruiting Coordinator For Defense	2nd	Colorado State (2005)
Maurice Harris	Tight Ends/Recruiting Coordinator For Offense	2nd	Arkansas State (1998)
Grant Heard	Wide Receivers	2nd	Ole Miss (2001)
Derrick Nix	Running Backs	6th	Southern Miss (2002)
Paul Jackson	Head Strength & Conditioning Coach	2nd	Montclair State (2006)

== Schedule ==
Ole Miss travelled to SEC opponents Vanderbilt, Auburn, Alabama, and ended the season on the road against Mississippi State. The Rebels played host to Texas A&M, Arkansas, LSU and Missouri. Ole Miss also travelled to Power 5 foe Texas.

Date	Time	Opponent	Rank	Site	TV	Result	Attendance
August 29	8:15 p.m.	at Vanderbilt		Vanderbilt Stadium; Nashville, TN (rivalry)	ESPN	W 39–35 (vacated)	40,350
September 7	6:00 p.m.	SE Missouri State*		Vaught–Hemingway Stadium; Oxford, MS	CSS, PPV	W 31–13 (vacated)	60,815
September 14	7:00 p.m.	at Texas*	No. 25	Darrell K Royal–Texas Memorial Stadium; Austin, TX	LHN*	W 44–23 (vacated)	101,474
September 28	5:30 p.m.	at No. 1 Alabama	No. 21	Bryant–Denny Stadium; Tuscaloosa, AL (rivalry)	ESPN	L 0–25	101,821
October 5	6:00 p.m.	at Auburn	No. 24	Jordan–Hare Stadium; Auburn, AL (rivalry)	ESPNU	L 22–30	86,504
October 12	7:30 p.m.	No. 9 Texas A&M		Vaught–Hemingway Stadium; Oxford, MS	ESPN	L 38–41	60,950
October 19	6:00 p.m.	No. 6 LSU		Vaught–Hemingway Stadium; Oxford, MS (Magnolia Bowl)	ESPN2	W 27–24 (vacated)	61,160
October 26	6:30 p.m.	Idaho*^{†}		Vaught–Hemingway Stadium; Oxford, MS	CSS	W 59–14 (vacated)	57,870
November 9	11:21 a.m.	Arkansas		Vaught–Hemingway Stadium; Oxford, MS (rivalry)	SECTV	W 34–24 (vacated)	60,856
November 16	11:00 a.m.	Troy*		Vaught–Hemingway Stadium; Oxford, MS	ESPNU	W 51–21 (vacated)	52,931
November 23	6:45 p.m.	No. 8 Missouri	No. 24	Vaught–Hemingway Stadium; Oxford, MS	ESPN	L 10–24	61,168
November 28	6:30 p.m.	at Mississippi State		Davis Wade Stadium; Starkville, MS (Egg Bowl)	ESPN	L 10–17 ^{OT}	55,113
December 30	2:15 p.m.	vs. Georgia Tech*		LP Field; Nashville, TN (Music City Bowl)	ESPN	W 25–17	52,125
*Non-conference game; ^{†}Homecoming; Rankings from AP Poll released prior to game; All times are in Central time

*- The game was produced by Longhorn Network. The following stations broadcast the game live throughout the Ole Miss broadcasting region.

- WREG (Memphis)
- WFGX (Mobile/Pensacola)
- WJTV (Jackson)
- WCBI (Columbus-Tupelo)
- WXXV (Biloxi-Gulfport)
- WHLT (Hattiesburg-Laurel)
- WMDN (Meridian)
- WABG (Greenwood-Greenville)

== Game summaries ==
=== Vanderbilt ===
	1	2	3	4	Total
Rebels	10	0	15	14	39
Commodores	0	21	7	7	35

=== SE Missouri State ===
	1	2	3	4	Total
Redhawks	0	0	13	0	13
Rebels	17	14	0	0	31

=== Texas ===
	1	2	3	4	Total
#25 Rebels	14	3	20	7	44
Longhorns	7	16	0	0	23

=== Alabama ===
	1	2	3	4	Total
#21 Rebels	0	0	0	0	0
#1 Crimson Tide	3	6	7	9	25

=== Auburn ===
	1	2	3	4	Total
#24 Rebels	3	3	10	6	22
Tigers	13	7	7	3	30

=== Texas A&M ===
	1	2	3	4	Total
#9 Aggies	14	0	7	20	41
Rebels	7	3	7	21	38

=== LSU ===
	1	2	3	4	Total
#6 Tigers	0	0	14	10	24
Rebels	3	7	14	3	27

=== Idaho ===
	1	2	3	4	Total
Vandals	0	7	7	0	14
Rebels	17	7	21	14	59

=== Arkansas ===
	1	2	3	4	Total
Razorbacks	3	7	7	7	24
Rebels	10	10	14	0	34

=== Troy ===
	1	2	3	4	Total
Trojans	7	0	0	14	21
Rebels	20	7	17	7	51

=== Missouri ===
	1	2	3	4	Total
#8 Tigers	7	10	0	7	24
#24 Rebels	0	3	7	0	10

=== Mississippi State ===
	1	2	3	4	OT	Total
Rebels	0	7	3	0	0	10
Bulldogs	0	7	0	3	7	17

=== Georgia Tech ===
	1	2	3	4	Total
Yellow Jackets	7	0	0	10	17
Rebels	7	6	10	2	25

== Rankings ==
Ranking movements Legend: ██ Increase in ranking ██ Decrease in ranking — = Not ranked RV = Received votes
	Week																
Poll	Pre	1	2	3	4	5	6	7	8	9	10	11	12	13	14	15	Final
AP	RV	RV	25	21	21	24	RV	—	RV	RV	RV	RV	24	RV	—	—	RV
Coaches	RV	RV	25	22	21	RV	RV	—	RV	RV	RV	RV	RV	—	—	—	RV
Harris	Not released							—	RV	RV	RV	RV	RV	RV	—	—	Not released
BCS	Not released								—	—	—	—	24	—	—	—	Not released
