= 2013 Tennessee Volunteers football team =

American college football season

2013 Tennessee Volunteers football
- Conference: Southeastern Conference
- Eastern Division
- Record: 5–7 (2–6 SEC)
- Head coach: Butch Jones (1st season)
- Offensive coordinator: Mike Bajakian (1st season)
- Offensive scheme: Multiple
- Defensive coordinator: John Jancek (1st season)
- Base defense: 4–3
- Home stadium: Neyland Stadium

2013 Southeastern Conference football standings
	Conf.			Overall
Team	W		L	W		L
Eastern Division
No. 5 Missouri x	7	–	1	12	–	2
No. 4 South Carolina	6	–	2	11	–	2
Georgia	5	–	3	8	–	5
No. 24 Vanderbilt	4	–	4	9	–	4
Florida	3	–	5	4	–	8
Tennessee	2	–	6	5	–	7
Kentucky	0	–	8	2	–	10
Western Division
No. 2 Auburn xy$	7	–	1	12	–	2
No. 7 Alabama x%	7	–	1	11	–	2
No. 14 LSU *	5	–	3	10	–	3
No. 18 Texas A&M	4	–	4	9	–	4
Mississippi State	3	–	5	7	–	6
Ole Miss *	3	–	5	8	–	5
Arkansas	0	–	8	3	–	9
Championship: Auburn 59, Missouri 42
$ – BCS representative as conference champion; % – BCS at-large representative; x – Division champion/co-champions; y – Championship game participant; * LSU and Ole Miss vacated all wins (except for Ole Miss' Music City Bowl win) due to NCAA violations.; Rankings from AP Poll

The 2013 Tennessee Volunteers football team represented the University of Tennessee in the 2013 NCAA Division I FBS football season. The Volunteers played their home games at Neyland Stadium in Knoxville, Tennessee and competes in the Eastern Division of the Southeastern Conference (SEC). The team was coached by Butch Jones, who was in his inaugural season with UT. Jones was hired on December 7, 2012, to replace Derek Dooley who was fired on November 18, 2012, after an 41–18 loss to Vanderbilt. On August 31, 2013, Tennessee earned its 800th victory in program history against Austin Peay and became only the eighth school in the nation to reach that plateau after Michigan, Texas, Notre Dame, Nebraska, Ohio State, Oklahoma, and Alabama.

== Coaching staff ==
Name	Position	Seasons at Tennessee	Alma Mater
Butch Jones	Head coach	1st	Ferris State (1989)
Mike Bajakian	Offensive Coordinator/Quarterbacks	1st	Williams College (1996)
John Jancek	Defensive Coordinator/Linebackers	1st	Grand Valley State (1991)
Steve Stripling	Assistant Head Coach/Defensive Line Coach	1st	Colorado (1975)
Zach Azzanni	Wide Receivers / Recruiting Coordinator	1st	Central Michigan (1999)
Mark Elder	Tight Ends/Special Teams Coordinator	1st	Case Western Reserve (2000)
Robert Gillespie	Running Backs	1st	Florida (2005)
Don Mahoney	Offensive Line	1st	West Virginia State (1993)
Willie Martinez	Defensive Backs	1st	Miami (1983)
Tommy Thigpen	Linebackers	1st	North Carolina (1992)
Dave Lawson	Strength and Conditioning	1st	West Virginia Tech (1992)

== Schedule ==
Date	Time	Opponent	Site	TV	Result	Attendance
August 31	6:00 pm	Austin Peay*	Neyland Stadium; Knoxville, TN	PPV	W 45–0	97,169
September 7	12:21 pm	Western Kentucky*	Neyland Stadium; Knoxville, TN	SECTV	W 52–20	86,783
September 14	3:30 pm	at No. 2 Oregon*	Autzen Stadium; Eugene, OR	ABC	L 14–59	57,895
September 21	3:30 pm	at No. 19 Florida	Ben Hill Griffin Stadium; Gainesville, FL (Third Saturday in September)	CBS	L 17–31	90,074
September 28	12:21 pm	South Alabama*	Neyland Stadium; Knoxville, TN	SECTV	W 31–24	87,266
October 5	3:30 pm	No. 6 Georgia	Neyland Stadium; Knoxville, TN (rivalry)	CBS	L 31–34 ^{OT}	102,455
October 19	12:00 pm	No. 11 South Carolina	Neyland Stadium; Knoxville, TN (rivalry)	ESPN	W 23–21	95,736
October 26	3:30 pm	at No. 1 Alabama	Bryant–Denny Stadium; Tuscaloosa, AL (Third Saturday in October)	CBS	L 10–45	101,821
November 2	7:00 pm	at No. 10 Missouri	Faurot Field; Columbia, MO	ESPN	L 3–31	67,124
November 9	12:00 pm	No. 9 Auburn^{†}	Neyland Stadium; Knoxville, TN (rivalry)	ESPN	L 23–55	102,455
November 23	7:00 pm	Vanderbilt	Neyland Stadium; Knoxville, TN (rivalry)	ESPN2	L 10–14	97,223
November 30	7:00 pm	at Kentucky	Commonwealth Stadium; Lexington, KY (Battle for the Barrel)	ESPNU	W 27–14	54,986
*Non-conference game; ^{†}Homecoming; Rankings from AP Poll released prior to the game; All times are in Eastern time

== Team players drafted into the NFL ==
Player	Position	Round	Pick	NFL club
Ja'Wuan James	Offensive tackle	1	19	Miami Dolphins
Zach Fulton	Offensive guard	6	193	Kansas City Chiefs
Daniel McCullers	Defensive tackle	6	215	Pittsburgh Steelers
