= 2013 Georgia Bulldogs football team =

American college football season

2013 Georgia Bulldogs football

Gator Bowl, L 19–24 vs. Nebraska
- Conference: Southeastern Conference
- Eastern Division
- Record: 8–5 (5–3 SEC)
- Head coach: Mark Richt (13th season)
- Offensive coordinator: Mike Bobo (7th season)
- Offensive scheme: Pro-style
- Defensive coordinator: Todd Grantham (4th season)
- Base defense: 3–4
- Home stadium: Sanford Stadium

2013 Southeastern Conference football standings
| | Conf. | | | Overall |
| Team | W | | L | W | | L |
|---|---|---|---|---|---|---|
Eastern Division
| No. 5 Missouri x | 7 | – | 1 | 12 | – | 2 |
| No. 4 South Carolina | 6 | – | 2 | 11 | – | 2 |
| Georgia | 5 | – | 3 | 8 | – | 5 |
| No. 24 Vanderbilt | 4 | – | 4 | 9 | – | 4 |
| Florida | 3 | – | 5 | 4 | – | 8 |
| Tennessee | 2 | – | 6 | 5 | – | 7 |
| Kentucky | 0 | – | 8 | 2 | – | 10 |
Western Division
| No. 2 Auburn xy$ | 7 | – | 1 | 12 | – | 2 |
| No. 7 Alabama x% | 7 | – | 1 | 11 | – | 2 |
| No. 14 LSU * | 5 | – | 3 | 10 | – | 3 |
| No. 18 Texas A&M | 4 | – | 4 | 9 | – | 4 |
| Mississippi State | 3 | – | 5 | 7 | – | 6 |
| Ole Miss * | 3 | – | 5 | 8 | – | 5 |
| Arkansas | 0 | – | 8 | 3 | – | 9 |
Championship: Auburn 59, Missouri 42
$ – BCS representative as conference champion; % – BCS at-large representative; x – Division champion/co-champions; y – Championship game participant; * LSU and Ole Miss vacated all wins (except for Ole Miss' Music City Bowl win) due to NCAA violations.; Rankings from AP Poll

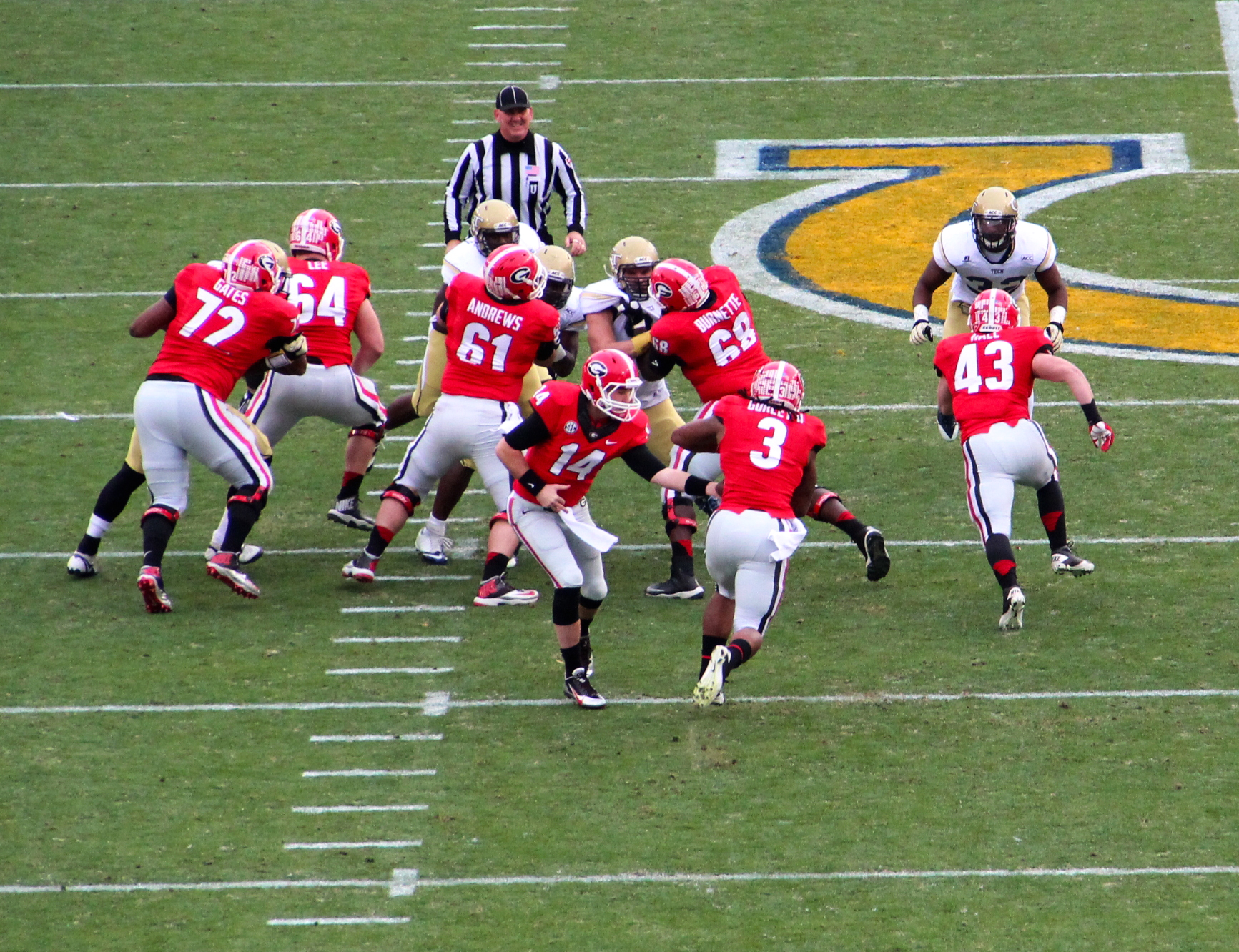
Georgia vs Georgia Tech, November 30, 2013

The 2013 Georgia Bulldogs football team represented the University of Georgia in the 2013 NCAA Division I FBS football season. They were led by head coach Mark Richt, who was in his thirteenth year as head coach. The Bulldogs played their home games at Sanford Stadium. They were a member of the Eastern Division of the Southeastern Conference.

ESPN's College GameDay aired live from the university campus on September 28, 2013 before the Bulldogs played LSU.

== Personnel ==
=== Coaching staff ===
| Name | Position | Seasons at Georgia | Alma mater |
|---|---|---|---|
| Mark Richt | Head coach | 13 | Miami (FL) (1982) |
| Mike Bobo | Offensive coordinator, Quarterbacks | 13 | Georgia (1997) |
| Todd Grantham | Defensive coordinator/Outside Linebackers | 4 | Virginia Tech (1989) |
| Bryan McClendon | Running backs | 5 | Georgia (2005) |
| John Lilly | Tight ends | 6 | Guilford College (1990) |
| Tony Ball | Wide receivers | 5 | Chattanooga (1983) |
| Will Friend | Offensive line | 3 | Alabama (1998) |
| Chris Wilson | Defensive line | 1 | Oklahoma (1992) |
| Kirk Olivadotti | Inside Linebackers | 3 | Purdue (1996) |
| Scott Lakatos | Defensive backs | 4 | Western Connecticut (1988) |
| Dan Inman | Offensive Graduate Assistant | 1 | UNC–Pembroke (2012) |
| Doug Saylor | Offensive Graduate Assistant | 1 | Georgia (2011) |
| Tyler Maloof | Offensive Program Coordinator | 1 | Georgia (2012) |
| Mike Macdonald | Defensive Quality Control Coach | 4 | Georgia (2010) |
| Christian Robinson | Defensive Graduate Assistant | 0 | Georgia (2013) |
| Buddy Collins | Defensive Program Coordinator | 0 | MidAmerica Nazarene (2010) |

== Schedule ==
| Date | Time | Opponent | Rank | Site | TV | Result | Attendance |
|---|---|---|---|---|---|---|---|
| August 31 | 8:00 p.m. | at No. 8 Clemson* | No. 5 | Memorial Stadium; Clemson, SC (rivalry) (College GameDay) | ABC | L 35–38 | 83,830 |
| September 7 | 4:30 p.m. | No. 6 South Carolina | No. 11 | Sanford Stadium; Athens, GA (rivalry) | ESPN | W 41–30 | 92,746 |
| September 21 | 12:21 p.m. | North Texas* | No. 9 | Sanford Stadium; Athens, GA | SECTV | W 45–21 | 92,746 |
| September 28 | 3:30 p.m. | No. 6 LSU | No. 9 | Sanford Stadium; Athens, GA (College GameDay) | CBS | W 44–41 | 92,746 |
| October 5 | 3:30 p.m. | at Tennessee | No. 6 | Neyland Stadium; Knoxville, TN (rivalry) | CBS | W 34–31 ^{OT} | 102,455 |
| October 12 | 12:00 p.m. | No. 25 Missouri | No. 7 | Sanford Stadium; Athens, GA | ESPN | L 26–41 | 92,746 |
| October 19 | 12:00 p.m. | at Vanderbilt | No. 15 | Vanderbilt Stadium; Nashville, TN (rivalry) | CBS | L 27–31 | 40,350 |
| November 2 | 3:30 p.m. | vs. Florida | | EverBank Field; Jacksonville, FL (rivalry) | CBS | W 23–20 | 84,693 |
| November 9 | 12:30 p.m. | Appalachian State*^{†} | | Sanford Stadium; Athens, GA | ESPN3 | W 45–6 | 92,746 |
| November 16 | 3:30 p.m. | at No. 7 Auburn | No. 25 | Jordan–Hare Stadium; Auburn, AL (Deep South's Oldest Rivalry) | CBS | L 38–43 | 87,451 |
| November 23 | 7:00 p.m. | Kentucky | | Sanford Stadium; Athens, GA | ESPNU | W 59–17 | 92,746 |
| November 30 | 3:30 p.m. | at Georgia Tech* | | Bobby Dodd Stadium; Atlanta, GA (Clean, Old-Fashioned Hate) | ABC | W 41–34 ^{2OT} | 54,914 |
| January 1, 2014 | 12:00 p.m. | vs. Nebraska* | No. 23 | EverBank Field; Jacksonville, FL (Gator Bowl) | ESPN2 | L 19–24 | 60,712 |
*Non-conference game; ^{†}Homecoming; Rankings from AP Poll released prior to the game; All times are in Eastern time

== Depth chart ==
Defense

FS
Tray Matthews
⋅
⋅

| WLB | ILB | ILB | SLB |
|---|---|---|---|
| Jordan Jenkins | Ramik Wilson | Amarlo Herrera | ⋅ |
| Josh Dawson | ⋅ | Reggie Carter | ⋅ |
| ⋅ | ⋅ | ⋅ | ⋅ |

SS
Josh Harvey-Clemons
Conner Norman
⋅

CB
Damien Swann
⋅
⋅

| DE | NT | DE |
|---|---|---|
| Garrison Smith | Mike Thornton | Sterling Bailey |
| ⋅ | Chris Mayes | Ray Drew |
| ⋅ | ⋅ | ⋅ |

CB
Brendan Langley
Sheldon Dawson
⋅

Offense

Flanker
Malcolm Mitchell Jr.
Rantavious Wooten Sr.
Justin Scott-Wesley So.

| LT | LG | C | RG | RT |
|---|---|---|---|---|
| John Theus So. | Dallas Lee Sr. | David Andrews Jr. | Chris Burnette Sr. | Kenarious Gates Sr. |
| Mark Beard Jr. | Greg Pyke Fr.(RS) | Hunter Long So. | Austin Long Jr. | Xzavier Ward So. |
| Zach DeBell So. | Josh Cardiello Fr. | Josh Cardiello Fr. | Aulden Bynum Fr. | Watts Dantzler Jr. |

TE
Arthur Lynch Sr.
Jay Rome So.
Ty Flournoy-Smith So.

Split End
Michael Bennett Jr.
Chris Conley Jr.
Rhett McGowan Jr.

QB
Aaron Murray Sr.
Hutson Mason Jr.
Parker Welch Jr.

RB
Todd Gurley So.
Keith Marshall So.
Brandon Harton Jr.

FB
Merritt Hall Jr.
Quayvon Hicks So.
Corey Campbell Sr.

== Rankings ==
Ranking movements Legend: ██ Increase in ranking ██ Decrease in ranking — = Not ranked RV = Received votes ( ) = First-place votes
| | Week | | | | | | | | | | | | | | | | |
| Poll | Pre | 1 | 2 | 3 | 4 | 5 | 6 | 7 | 8 | 9 | 10 | 11 | 12 | 13 | 14 | 15 | Final |
|---|---|---|---|---|---|---|---|---|---|---|---|---|---|---|---|---|---|
| AP | 5 (1) | 11 | 9 | 9 | 9 | 6 | 7 | 15 | RV | RV | RV | 25 | RV | RV | 25 | 23 | RV |
| Coaches | 5 | 12 | 10 | 10 | 10 | 6 | 7 | 16 | RV | RV | RV | RV | RV | RV | RV | 24 | — |
| Harris | Not released | | | | | | | 16 | RV | RV | RV | 25 | RV | RV | 25 | 23 | Not released |
| BCS | Not released | | | | | | | | — | — | — | 25 | — | — | 22 | 22 | Not released |
