= 2014 Cotton Bowl Classic =

2014 AT&T Cotton Bowl Classic
- 78th Cotton Bowl Classic
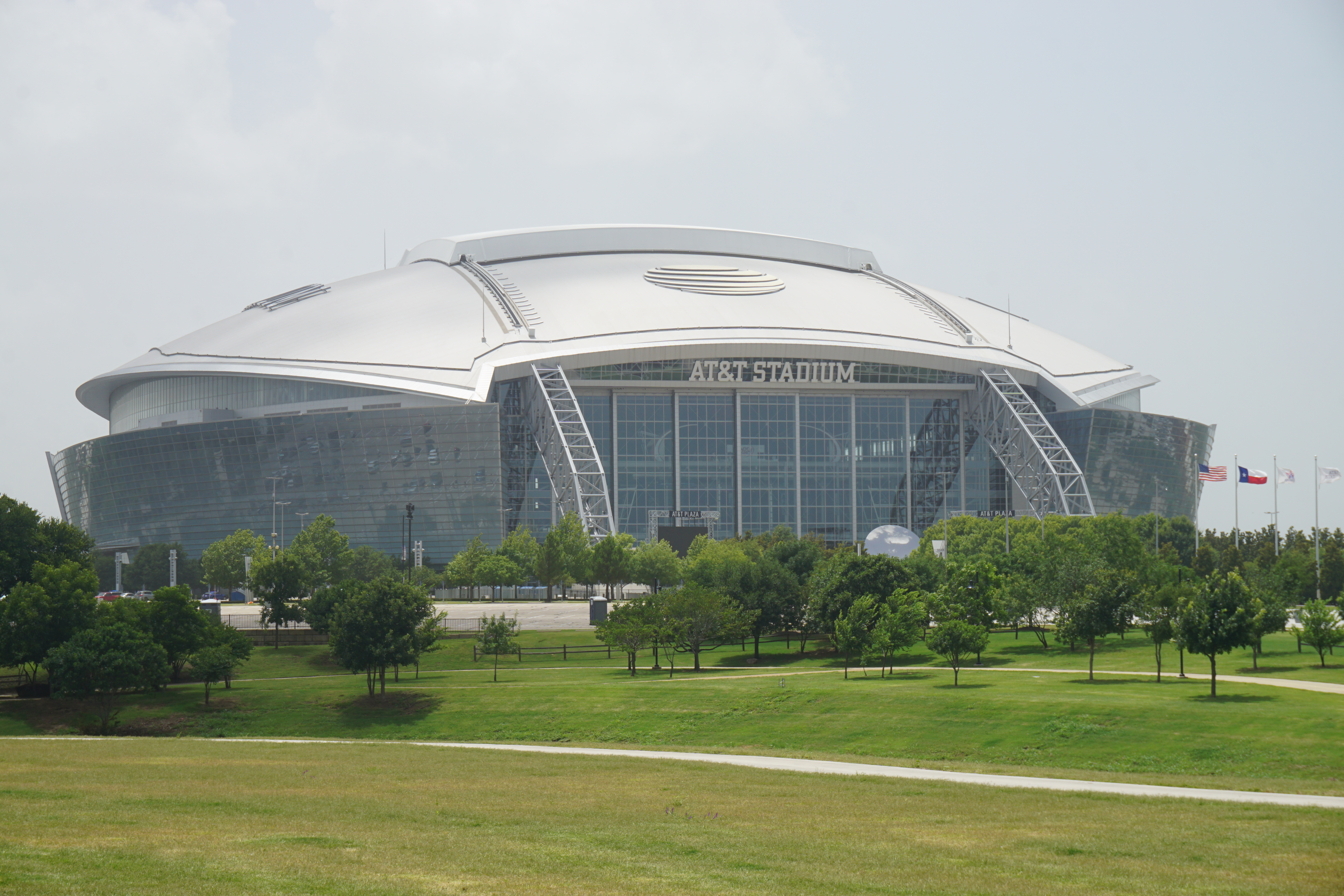
- AT&T Stadium in Arlington, Texas, hosted the Cotton Bowl Classic.
Oklahoma State Cowboys	Missouri Tigers
(10–2)	(11–2)
Big 12	SEC
31	41
Head coach: Mike Gundy	Head coach: Gary Pinkel
AP / Coaches / BCS; 13 / 13 / 13	AP / Coaches / BCS; 9 / 9 / 8
	1	2	3	4	Total
Oklahoma State	7	0	7	17	31
Missouri	7	10	0	24	41
- Date: January 3, 2014
- Season: 2013
- Stadium: AT&T Stadium
- Location: Arlington, Texas
- MVP: RB Henry Josey (Missouri); LB Andrew Wilson (Missouri)
- National anthem: Pat Monahan (Train's lead singer)
- Referee: Bill LeMonnier (Big Ten)
- Attendance: 72,690
- Payout: US$3,625,000

United States TV coverage
- Network: FOX/ESPN Radio
- Announcers: Gus Johnson (Play-by-Play); Charles Davis (Analyst); Kristina Pink (Sideline)

The 2014 Cotton Bowl Classic was a college football bowl game between the #9 Missouri Tigers of the Southeastern Conference and the #13 Oklahoma State Cowboys of the Big 12 Conference. The 78th edition of the Cotton Bowl Classic took place on January 3, 2014, at 8:00 p.m. EST and aired on FOX. It was one of the 2013–14 bowl games that concluded the 2013 FBS football season. AT&T Stadium, formerly known as Cowboys Stadium and located in Arlington, Texas, hosted the game for the sixth straight year. The game was sponsored by telecommunications company AT&T, and was officially known as the AT&T Cotton Bowl Classic.

The Tigers beat the Cowboys by a score of 41–31 to claim the school's second-ever Cotton Bowl Classic championship and set a new AT&T Stadium record with 24 points in the fourth quarter. This was the final Cotton Bowl Classic in the BCS Era, as the College Football Playoff was introduced to start the next season.

== Teams ==
This was Missouri's third appearance in the Cotton Bowl Classic (their first as a member of the SEC) and Oklahoma State's fourth appearance. Missouri and Oklahoma State were previously conference rivals in the Big 12. In addition, the two teams shared a conference from 1925 to 1928 (when the conference was called the Missouri Valley Intercollegiate Athletic Association and would become the Missouri Valley Conference after that year) and again from 1958 to 2012 (still under the MVIAA name until 1964, then under the name Big Eight Conference from 1964 to 1996).

=== Missouri ===
The Missouri Tigers were coached by Gary Pinkel. Missouri won the SEC Eastern Division but lost to Auburn in the 2013 SEC Championship Game 59–42. Auburn and Alabama took the conference's two BCS bids over Missouri.

=== Oklahoma State ===
The Oklahoma State Cowboys were coached by Mike Gundy. Oklahoma State led the Big 12 Conference going into the final week of the season, but lost to Oklahoma 33–24 on December 7. Baylor won later that day to clinch the conference's BCS bid.

== Scoring summary ==
Scoring summary

Quarter	Time	Drive			Team	Scoring information	Score	
Quarter	Time	Plays	Yards	TOP	Team	Scoring information	Oklahoma State	Missouri
1	3:00	11	50	2:57	MIZZ	Henry Josey 3-yard touchdown run, Andrew Baggett kick good	0	7
1	1:44	5	75	4:58	OKST	Josh Stewart 40-yard touchdown reception from Clint Chelf, Ben Grogan kick good	7	7
2	10:20	6	80	3:49	MIZZ	Marcus Lucas 40-yard touchdown reception from Maty Mauk, Baggett kick good	7	14
2	0:00	11	62	1:35	MIZZ	35-yard field goal by Baggett	7	17
3	2:10	3	33	0:44	OKST	Jhajuan Seales 21-yard touchdown reception from Chelf, Grogan kick good	14	17
4	13:32	4	2	1:10	OKST	25-yard field goal by Grogan	17	17
4	11:32	6	60	2:00	MIZZ	Josey 25-yard touchdown run, Baggett kick good	17	24
4	9:51	8	75	1:41	OKST	Chelf 23-yard touchdown run, Grogan kick good	24	24
4	6:29	8	47	3:22	MIZZ	46-yard field goal by Baggett	24	27
4	5:04	7	75	1:25	OKST	Desmond Roland 2-yard touchdown run, Grogan kick good	31	27
4	3:08	7	69	1:55	MIZZ	Josey 16-yard touchdown run, Baggett kick good	31	34
4	0:55	-	-	-	MIZZ	Shane Ray 73 yards fumble return, Baggett kick good	31	41
"TOP" = time of possession. For other American football terms, see Glossary of American football.							31	41

=== Statistics ===
Statistics	Oklahoma State	Missouri
First downs	26	29
Total offense, plays – yards	96–548	91–462
Rushes-yards (net)-TD	39–167–2	47–256–3
Passing yards (net)-TD	381	206
Passes, Comp-Att	33–57	17–44
Interceptions-Yds-TD	1–14–0	2–3–0
Fumbles, Number-Lost	2–1	2–2
Fumbles, return YDS-TD	0–0	73–1
Penalties, Number-Yds	10–100	4–42
Punts, Number-Yds (avg)	8–298 (37.2)	7–287 (41.0)
Kickoffs, Number-Yds (avg)	6–369 (61.5)	7–446 (63.7)
Sacks By, Number-Yds	2–16	3–20
Field Goals, Good-Att	1–2	2–2
Third-Down Conversions	9 of 22	6 of 18
Fourth-Down Conversions	1 of 1	1 of 2
PAT Kicks	4–4	5–5
Possession Time	27:49	32:11

== Notes ==
- December 28, 2013 – Big 12 team and SEC team arrival
- January 3, 2014 – The game lasted four hours and 19 minutes, became the longest in Classic history
