= 2013 SEC Championship Game =

- Conference Championship
- 2013 SEC Championship logo
Missouri Tigers	Auburn Tigers
(11–1)	(11–1)
42	59
Head coach: Gary Pinkel	Head coach: Gus Malzahn
AP / Coaches / BCS; 5 / 5 / 5	AP / Coaches / BCS; 3 / 3 / 3
	1	2	3	4	Total
Missouri	10	17	15	0	42
Auburn	14	14	17	14	59
- Date: December 7, 2013
- Season: 2013
- Stadium: Georgia Dome
- Location: Atlanta, Georgia
- MVP: RB Tre Mason, Auburn
- Favorite: Missouri by 2
- Referee: Hubert Owens
- Attendance: 75,632

United States TV coverage
- Network: CBS; Westwood One
- Announcers: CBS: Verne Lundquist (play-by-play); Gary Danielson (color); Tracy Wolfson (sideline); Westwood One: John Tautges (play-by-play); Terry Donahue (color); Chris Doering (sideline)

2013 Southeastern Conference football standings
	Conf.			Overall
Team	W		L	W		L
Eastern Division
No. 5 Missouri x	7	–	1	12	–	2
No. 4 South Carolina	6	–	2	11	–	2
Georgia	5	–	3	8	–	5
No. 24 Vanderbilt	4	–	4	9	–	4
Florida	3	–	5	4	–	8
Tennessee	2	–	6	5	–	7
Kentucky	0	–	8	2	–	10
Western Division
No. 2 Auburn xy$	7	–	1	12	–	2
No. 7 Alabama x%	7	–	1	11	–	2
No. 14 LSU *	5	–	3	10	–	3
No. 18 Texas A&M	4	–	4	9	–	4
Mississippi State	3	–	5	7	–	6
Ole Miss *	3	–	5	8	–	5
Arkansas	0	–	8	3	–	9
Championship: Auburn 59, Missouri 42
$ – BCS representative as conference champion; % – BCS at-large representative; x – Division champion/co-champions; y – Championship game participant; * LSU and Ole Miss vacated all wins (except for Ole Miss' Music City Bowl win) due to NCAA violations.; Rankings from AP Poll

The 2013 SEC Championship Game was a college football game that was played on Saturday, December 7, 2013 in the Georgia Dome in Atlanta, with the kickoff at 4:12pm ET. The 22nd annual SEC Championship Game, determined the 2013 champion of the Southeastern Conference (SEC). The game was played between the Auburn Tigers, champions of the SEC's Western division, and the Missouri Tigers, champions of SEC's Eastern division. The winner of this game had the chance to play Florida State for the National Championship if Ohio State were to lose to Michigan State in the Big Ten Championship (which they did). In the highest-scoring contest in the game's 21-year history, Auburn won 59–42. They narrowly lost the BCS National Championship to Florida State 34–31 and finished #2 in the nation with a 12–2 (7–1 SEC) record. Missouri won the Cotton Bowl Classic 41–31 over Oklahoma State and finished #5 in the nation with an identical 12–2 (7–1 SEC) record.

Auburn was the designated home team. The game was televised by CBS Sports for the 13th straight year.

== Notes ==
The winner of this game the last seven seasons has gone on to play for the BCS National Championship posting a record of 6–1. In 2011, SEC Champion LSU played fellow conference and division team Alabama for the national championship, marking first time two teams from the same conference and division played for the title. Alabama won 21–0.

Neither 2013 division champion was bowl-eligible the previous year. In 2012 Missouri had a record of 5–7 (2–6 SEC), and Auburn was 3–9 (0–8 SEC).

Missouri and Auburn combined for a total of 101 points the most in the history of the SEC Championship Game.

== Teams ==
=== Missouri ===
After missing out on a bowl the previous season, the Tigers rebounded to win their first-ever SEC East title. They had won three division titles in the Big 12 in 2007, 2008, and 2010.

=== Auburn ===
Only a year after their worst season in 60 years—including a winless SEC record—Auburn completed one of the biggest turnarounds in NCAA history. An upset win over rival Alabama gave them the SEC West title and a chance at playing for the national championship.

== Scoring summary ==
1st quarter scoring:

- Mizzou – Andrew Baggett 42-yard field goal, Mizzou 3–0. Drive: 5 plays, 19 yards, 1:08.
- Auburn – Sammie Coates 38-yard pass from Nick Marshall (Cody Parkey kick), Auburn 7–3. Drive: 7 plays, 75 yards, 2:28.
- Mizzou – Dorial Green-Beckham 28-yard pass from James Franklin (Andrew Baggett kick), Mizzou 10–7. Drive: 7 plays, 75 yards, 2:42.
- Auburn – Nick Marshall 9-yard run (Cody Parkey kick), Auburn 14–10. Drive: 5 plays, 75 yards, 1:31.

2nd quarter scoring:

- Mizzou – E.J. Gaines 11-yard fumble return (Andrew Baggett kick), Mizzou 17–14.
- Auburn – Tre Mason 7-yard run (Cody Parkey kick), Auburn 21–17. Drive: 8 plays, 75 yards, 2:46.
- Mizzou – Andrew Baggett 36-yard field goal, Auburn 21–20. Drive: 9 plays, 58 yards, 3:06.
- Auburn – Tre Mason 3-yard run (Cody Parkey kick), Auburn 28–20. Drive: 4 plays, 9 yards, 0:53.
- Mizzou – Dorial Green-Beckham 55-yard pass from James Franklin (Andrew Baggett kick), Auburn 28–27. Drive: 6 plays, 92 yards, 0:52.

3rd quarter scoring:

- Auburn – Cody Parkey 52 yard field goal, Auburn 31–27. Drive: 5 plays, 13 yards, 2:05.
- Mizzou – Marcus Murphy 10-yard pass from James Franklin (Andrew Baggett kick), Mizzou 34–31. Drive: 7 plays, 75 yards, 2:42.
- Auburn – Corey Grant 2-yard run (Cody Parkey kick), Auburn 38–34. Drive: 6 plays, 75 yards, 2:14.
- Auburn – Cameron Artis-Payne 15-yard run (Cody Parkey kick), Auburn 45–34. Drive: 5 plays, 54 yards, 1:26.
- Mizzou – James Franklin 5-yard run (James Franklin 2-point conversion run), Auburn 45–42. Drive: 2 plays, 75 yards, 0:22.

4th quarter scoring:

- Auburn – Tre Mason 1-yard run (Cody Parkey kick), Auburn 52–42. Drive: 8 plays, 75 yards, 4:00.
- Auburn – Tre Mason 13-yard run (Cody Parkey kick), Auburn 59–42. Drive: 1 play, 13 yards, 0:05.

=== Statistics ===
Statistics	Auburn	Missouri
First downs	30	22
Total offense, plays yards	85–677	71–534
Rushes-yards (net)–TD	74-545–7	34-231–1
Passing yards (net)–TD	132–1	303–3
Passes, Comp-Att-Int	9–11–0	21–37–1
Fumbles, Number-Lost	3–2	1–0
Penalties, Number-Yds	10–63	7–40
Punts, Number-Yds (avg)	3–120 (40.0)	5–225 (45.0)
Kickoffs, Number-Yds (avg)	9–585 (65.0)	8–500 (62.5)
Sacks By, Number-Yds	3–14	1–6
Field Goals, Good-Att	1–2	2–2
Points off turnovers	0	10 (2 fumbles)
Time of Possession	34:20	25:40
