= 2013 Auburn Tigers football team =

American college football season

2013 Auburn Tigers football

SEC champion

SEC Championship Game, W 59–42 vs. Missouri

BCS National Championship Game, L 31–34 vs. Florida State
- Conference: Southeastern Conference
- Western Division

Ranking
- Coaches: No. 2
- AP: No. 2
- Record: 12–2 (7–1 SEC)
- Head coach: Gus Malzahn (1st season)
- Offensive coordinator: Rhett Lashlee (1st season)
- Co-offensive coordinator: Dameyune Craig (1st season)
- Offensive scheme: Spread option, Play Action / Read, Hurry-up offense
- Defensive coordinator: Ellis Johnson (1st season)
- Co-defensive coordinator: Charlie Harbison (1st season)
- Base defense: 4–2–5
- Captains: Chris Davis; Reese Dismukes
- Home stadium: Jordan–Hare Stadium

2013 Southeastern Conference football standings
| | Conf. | | | Overall |
| Team | W | | L | W | | L |
|---|---|---|---|---|---|---|
Eastern Division
| No. 5 Missouri x | 7 | – | 1 | 12 | – | 2 |
| No. 4 South Carolina | 6 | – | 2 | 11 | – | 2 |
| Georgia | 5 | – | 3 | 8 | – | 5 |
| No. 24 Vanderbilt | 4 | – | 4 | 9 | – | 4 |
| Florida | 3 | – | 5 | 4 | – | 8 |
| Tennessee | 2 | – | 6 | 5 | – | 7 |
| Kentucky | 0 | – | 8 | 2 | – | 10 |
Western Division
| No. 2 Auburn xy$ | 7 | – | 1 | 12 | – | 2 |
| No. 7 Alabama x% | 7 | – | 1 | 11 | – | 2 |
| No. 14 LSU * | 5 | – | 3 | 10 | – | 3 |
| No. 18 Texas A&M | 4 | – | 4 | 9 | – | 4 |
| Mississippi State | 3 | – | 5 | 7 | – | 6 |
| Ole Miss * | 3 | – | 5 | 8 | – | 5 |
| Arkansas | 0 | – | 8 | 3 | – | 9 |
Championship: Auburn 59, Missouri 42
$ – BCS representative as conference champion; % – BCS at-large representative; x – Division champion/co-champions; y – Championship game participant; * LSU and Ole Miss vacated all wins (except for Ole Miss' Music City Bowl win) due to NCAA violations.; Rankings from AP Poll

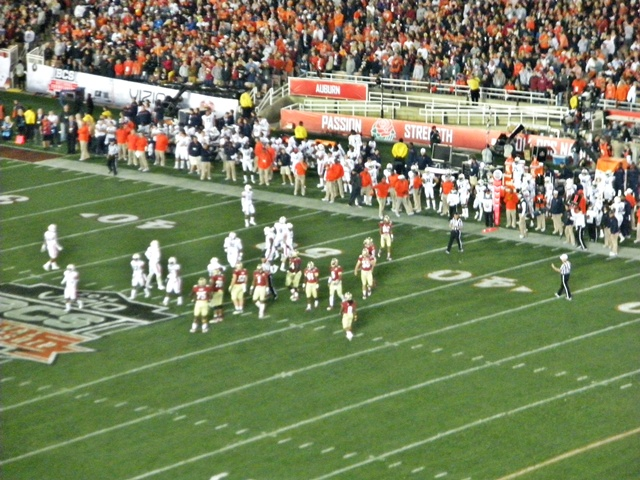
The Florida State Seminoles defeated the Auburn Tigers at the Rose Bowl, Pasadena, California

The 2013 Auburn Tigers football team represented Auburn University in the 2013 NCAA Division I FBS football season. The team was coached by Gus Malzahn, who was in his first season as head coach at Auburn, although he served as offensive coordinator from 2009 to 2011. The Tigers played their home games at Jordan–Hare Stadium in Auburn, Alabama and competed in the Western Division of the Southeastern Conference (SEC).

The 2013 season saw one of the biggest single-season turnarounds in college football history. Only a year after their worst season in 60 years—including only their third winless record in SEC play—the Tigers won their eighth SEC title and third of the championship game era, tallying a record of 12–2 (7–1 in SEC play). The season also contained two of the most memorable winning plays in college football history for Auburn in back to back nationally televised games against Georgia and Alabama.

== Preseason ==
After Gene Chizik's termination on November 25, 2012, Athletic Director Jay Jacobs formed a search committee headed by former Auburn Heisman Trophy winners Bo Jackson and Pat Sullivan along with fellow former player Mac Crawford to find the program's next head coach. The committee unanimously selected Arkansas State University head coach Gus Malzahn. On December 4, 2012, it was announced that Malzahn was the new head coach at Auburn University.

On April 20, 2013, Auburn played their Spring game, known as the A-day game. 83,401 people attended the game at Jordan–Hare Stadium, breaking the previous record of 83,217 set in 2010.

=== Recruiting class ===
College recruiting
| Name | Hometown | School | Height | Weight | 40^{‡} | Commit date |
|---|---|---|---|---|---|---|
| Montravius Adams; DT | Vienna, Georgia | Dooley County High School | 6 ft 3 in (1.91 m) | 290 lb (130 kg) | N/A | Feb 6, 2013 |
| Montravius Adams; DT | Recruit ratings: Scout: Rivals: (89) | | | | | |
| Mackenro Alexander; DB | Immokalee, Florida | Immokalee High School | 6 ft 0 in (1.83 m) | 190 lb (86 kg) | N/A | Feb 6, 2013 |
| Mackenro Alexander; DB | Recruit ratings: Scout: Rivals: (77) | | | | | |
| Cameron Artis-Payne; RB | Harrisburg, Pennsylvania | Allen Hancock Community College | 5 ft 11 in (1.80 m) | 210 lb (95 kg) | 4.50 | Nov 8, 2012 |
| Cameron Artis-Payne; RB | Recruit ratings: Scout: Rivals: (80) | | | | | |
| Peyton Barber; RB | Alpharetta, Georgia | Milton High School | 5 ft 10 in (1.78 m) | 211 lb (96 kg) | N/A | Feb 3, 2013 |
| Peyton Barber; RB | Recruit ratings: Scout: Rivals: (80) | | | | | |
| Ben Bradley; DT | Norcross, Georgia | Hutchinson Community College | 6 ft 2 in (1.88 m) | 315 lb (143 kg) | 5.2 | Jan 7, 2013 |
| Ben Bradley; DT | Recruit ratings: Scout: Rivals: (80) | | | | | |
| Daniel Carlson; K | Colorado Springs, Colorado | Classical Academy | 6 ft 5 in (1.96 m) | 195 lb (88 kg) | N/A | Jul 1, 2012 |
| Daniel Carlson; K | Recruit ratings: Scout: Rivals: (79) | | | | | |
| Elijah Daniel; DE | Avon, Indiana | Avon High School | 6 ft 3 in (1.91 m) | 249 lb (113 kg) | 4.80 | Feb 6, 2013 |
| Elijah Daniel; DE | Recruit ratings: Scout: Rivals: (87) | | | | | |
| Devonte Danzey; OL | Tampa, Florida | Hutchinson Community College | 6 ft 3 in (1.91 m) | 285 lb (129 kg) | N/A | Dec 25, 2012 |
| Devonte Danzey; OL | Recruit ratings: Scout: Rivals: (75) | | | | | |
| Marcus Davis; ATH | Delray Beach, Florida | American Heritage School | 5 ft 11 in (1.80 m) | 170 lb (77 kg) | N/A | Jan 27, 2013 |
| Marcus Davis; ATH | Recruit ratings: Scout: Rivals: (77) | | | | | |
| Kenny Flowers; LB | Lilburn, Georgia | Hutchinson Community College | 6 ft 2 in (1.88 m) | 225 lb (102 kg) | N/A | Jan 25, 2013 |
| Kenny Flowers; LB | Recruit ratings: Scout: Rivals: (77) | | | | | |
| Rudy Ford; RB | New Hope, Alabama | New Hope High School | 5 ft 11 in (1.80 m) | 190 lb (86 kg) | N/A | Feb 6, 2013 |
| Rudy Ford; RB | Recruit ratings: Scout: Rivals: (74) | | | | | |
| Khari Harding; DB | Edmond, Oklahoma | Santa Fe High School | 6 ft 1 in (1.85 m) | 205 lb (93 kg) | 4.6 | Jan 21, 2013 |
| Khari Harding; DB | Recruit ratings: Scout: Rivals: (79) | | | | | |
| Jeremy Johnson; QB | Montgomery, Alabama | Carver School | 6 ft 5 in (1.96 m) | 215 lb (98 kg) | N/A | May 20, 2012 |
| Jeremy Johnson; QB | Recruit ratings: Scout: Rivals: (83) | | | | | |
| Brandon King; DB | Alabaster, Alabama | Highland Community College | 6 ft 2 in (1.88 m) | 210 lb (95 kg) | 4.40 | Jan 5, 2013 |
| Brandon King; DB | Recruit ratings: Scout: Rivals: (80) | | | | | |
| Carl Lawson; DE | Alpharetta, Georgia | Milton High School | 6 ft 2 in (1.88 m) | 253 lb (115 kg) | 4.70 | Mar 24, 2012 |
| Carl Lawson; DE | Recruit ratings: Scout: Rivals: (92) | | | | | |
| Nick Marshall; QB | Pineview, Georgia | Garden City Community College | 6 ft 2 in (1.88 m) | 190 lb (86 kg) | N/A | Jan 14, 2013 |
| Nick Marshall; QB | Recruit ratings: Scout: Rivals: (80) | | | | | |
| Kamryn Melton; DB | Dothan, Alabama | Dothan High School | 5 ft 10 in (1.78 m) | 165 lb (75 kg) | 4.50 | Feb 27, 2012 |
| Kamryn Melton; DB | Recruit ratings: Scout: Rivals: (79) | | | | | |
| Deon Mix; OL | Batesville, Mississippi | South Panola High School | 6 ft 4 in (1.93 m) | 305 lb (138 kg) | N/A | Feb 6, 2013 |
| Deon Mix; OL | Recruit ratings: Scout: Rivals: (80) | | | | | |
| Earnest Robinson; WR | Pinson, Alabama | Pinson Valley High School | 6 ft 3 in (1.91 m) | 200 lb (91 kg) | 4.80 | Feb 26, 2012 |
| Earnest Robinson; WR | Recruit ratings: Scout: Rivals: (82) | | | | | |
| Jason Smith; ATH | Mobile, Alabama | McGill Toolen High School | 6 ft 1 in (1.85 m) | 187 lb (85 kg) | 4.50 | Jul 9, 2012 |
| Jason Smith; ATH | Recruit ratings: Scout: Rivals: (82) | | | | | |
| Tony Stevens; WR | Orlando, Florida | Evans High School | 6 ft 3 in (1.91 m) | 175 lb (79 kg) | N/A | Jan 20, 2013 |
| Tony Stevens; WR | Recruit ratings: Scout: Rivals: (83) | | | | | |
| Cameron Toney; LB | Huntsville, Alabama | Huntsville High School | 6 ft 3 in (1.91 m) | 225 lb (102 kg) | N/A | Apr 14, 2012 |
| Cameron Toney; LB | Recruit ratings: Scout: Rivals: (80) | | | | | |
| Dominic Walker; WR | Orlando, Florida | Evans High School | 6 ft 2 in (1.88 m) | 195 lb (88 kg) | N/A | Jan 25, 2013 |
| Dominic Walker; WR | Recruit ratings: Scout: Rivals: (83) | | | | | |
Overall recruit ranking: Scout: 14 Rivals: 8 ESPN: 11
‡ Refers to 40-yard dash; Note: In many cases, Scout, Rivals, 247Sports, On3, and ESPN may conflict in their listings of height, weight and 40 time.; In these cases, the average was taken. ESPN grades are on a 100-point scale.; Sources: "2013 Auburn Football Commitment List". Rivals.; "2013 Auburn College Football Recruiting Commits". Scout.; "Auburn 2013 Player Commits: Football". ESPN.; "Scout.com Team Recruiting Rankings". Scout.; "2013 Team Ranking". Rivals.com.

Note: E. Robinson was kicked out due to academic reasons

== Schedule ==
| Date | Time | Opponent | Rank | Site | TV | Result | Attendance |
|---|---|---|---|---|---|---|---|
| August 31 | 6:00 p.m. | Washington State* | | Jordan–Hare Stadium; Auburn, AL | ESPNU | W 31–24 | 85,095 |
| September 7 | 6:30 p.m. | Arkansas State* | | Jordan-Hare Stadium; Auburn, AL | SECRN | W 38–9 | 83,246 |
| September 14 | 6:00 p.m. | Mississippi State | | Jordan-Hare Stadium; Auburn, AL | ESPN2 | W 24–20 | 85,817 |
| September 21 | 6:45 p.m. | at No. 6 LSU | | Tiger Stadium; Baton Rouge, LA (rivalry) | ESPN | L 21–35 | 92,368 |
| October 5 | 6:00 p.m. | No. 24 Ole Miss | | Jordan-Hare Stadium; Auburn, AL (rivalry) | ESPNU | W 30–22 | 86,504 |
| October 12 | 1:00 p.m. | Western Carolina*^{†} | | Jordan-Hare Stadium; Auburn, AL | PPV | W 62–3 | 84,171 |
| October 19 | 2:30 p.m. | at No. 7 Texas A&M | No. 24 | Kyle Field; College Station, TX | CBS | W 45–41 | 87,165 |
| October 26 | 6:30 p.m. | Florida Atlantic* | No. 11 | Jordan-Hare Stadium; Auburn, AL | SECRN | W 45–10 | 85,517 |
| November 2 | 5:00 p.m. | at Arkansas | No. 11 | Donald W. Reynolds Razorback Stadium; Fayetteville, AR | ESPN2 | W 35–17 | 66,835 |
| November 9 | 11:00 a.m. | at Tennessee | No. 9 | Neyland Stadium; Knoxville, TN | ESPN | W 55–23 | 102,455 |
| November 16 | 2:30 p.m. | No. 25 Georgia | No. 7 | Jordan-Hare Stadium; Auburn, AL (Deep South's Oldest Rivalry) | CBS | W 43–38 | 87,451 |
| November 30 | 2:30 p.m. | No. 1 Alabama | No. 4 | Jordan-Hare Stadium; Auburn, AL (Iron Bowl, College GameDay) | CBS | W 34–28 | 87,451 |
| December 7 | 3:00 p.m. | vs. No. 5 Missouri | No. 3 | Georgia Dome; Atlanta, GA (SEC Championship Game) | CBS | W 59–42 | 75,632 |
| January 6, 2014 | 7:30 p.m. | vs. No. 1 Florida State* | No. 2 | Rose Bowl; Pasadena, CA (BCS National Championship Game, College GameDay) | ESPN | L 31–34 | 94,208 |
*Non-conference game; ^{†}Homecoming; Rankings from AP Poll released prior to the game; All times are in Central time

== Rankings ==
Ranking movements Legend: ██ Increase in ranking ██ Decrease in ranking RV = Received votes ( ) = First-place votes
| | Week | | | | | | | | | | | | | | | | |
| Poll | Pre | 1 | 2 | 3 | 4 | 5 | 6 | 7 | 8 | 9 | 10 | 11 | 12 | 13 | 14 | 15 | Final |
|---|---|---|---|---|---|---|---|---|---|---|---|---|---|---|---|---|---|
| AP | | | | | | RV | RV | 24 | 11 | 8 | 8 | 7 | 6 | 4 | 3 (2) | 2 (4) | 2 |
| Coaches | | | | | | RV | RV | RV | 17 | 11 | 9 | 9 | 5 | 5 | 3 | 2 | 2 |
| Harris | Not released | | | | | | | RV | 15 | 11 | 9 | 9 | 7 | 5 | 3 (3) | 2 (8) | Not released |
| BCS | Not released | | | | | | | | 11 | 11 | 9 | 9 | 6 | 4 | 3 | 2 | Not released |

== Game summaries ==
=== Washington State ===
Washington State Cougars at Auburn Tigers – Game summary

| Quarter | 1 | 2 | 3 | 4 | Total |
|---|---|---|---|---|---|
| Washington State | 7 | 14 | 3 | 0 | 24 |
| Auburn | 8 | 17 | 3 | 3 | 31 |

at Jordan–Hare Stadium • Auburn, Alabama

- Date: August 31
- Game time: 6:00 p.m. CDT
- Game weather: Muggy, 84 °F (29 °C)
- Game attendance: 85,095
- Referee: Hubert Owens
- TV announcers (ESPNU): Clay Matvick (play-by-play), Matt Stinchcomb (analyst), Dawn Davenport (sideline reporter)

Game information
First quarter
- WSU – Jeremy Laufasa 4-yard run (Andrew Furney kick), 10:43. Cougars 7–0. Drive: 12 plays, 75 yards, 4:17.
- AUB – Tre Mason 8-yard run (Ryan White run), 2:26. Tigers 8–7. Drive: 4 plays, 28 yards, 1:17.

Second quarter

- WSU – Bobby Ratliff 7-yard pass from Connor Halliday (Andrew Furney kick), 8:02. Cougars 14–8. Drive: 9 plays, 67 yards, 4:31.
- AUB – Tre Mason 100-yard kickoff return (Cody Parkey kick), 7:46. Tigers 15–14.
- WSU – Jeremy Laufasa 1-yard run (Andrew Furney kick), 6:18. Cougars 21–15. Drive: 5 plays, 75 yards, 1:28.
- AUB – Corey Grant 75-yard run (Cody Parkey kick), 6:06. Tigers 22–21. Drive: 1 play, 75 yards, 0:12.
- AUB – Cody Parkey 47-yard field goal, 1:11. Tigers 25–21. Drive: 6 plays, 16 yards, 2:04.

Third quarter

- AUB – Cody Parkey 26-yard field goal, 6:51. Tigers 28–21. Drive: 9 plays, 44 yards, 3:59.
- WSU – Andrew Furney 43-yard field goal, 4:18. Tigers 28–24. Drive: 9 plays, 39 yards, 2:33.

Fourth quarter

- AUB – Cody Parkey 42-yard field goal, 9:07. Tigers 31–24. Drive: 12 plays, 61 yards, 5:27.

| Statistics | WSU | AUB |
|---|---|---|
| First downs | 28 | 16 |
| Total yards | 464 | 394 |
| Rushing yards | 120 | 295 |
| Passing yards | 344 | 99 |
| Turnovers | 3 | 1 |
| Time of possession | 31:27 | 28:33 |

| Team | Category | Player | Statistics |
|---|---|---|---|
| Washington State | Passing | Connor Halliday | 35/65, 344 yards, TD, 3 INT |
| Washington State | Rushing | Teondray Caldwell | 7 rushes, 53 yards |
| Washington State | Receiving | Gabe Marks | 9 receptions, 81 yards |
| Auburn | Passing | Nick Marshall | 10/19, 99 yards |
| Auburn | Rushing | Corey Grant | 9 rushes, 146 yards, TD |
| Auburn | Receiving | Sammie Coates | 3 receptions, 44 yards |

The Auburn Tigers got the Gus Malzahn era off to a winning start with a 31–24 victory over the Washington State Cougars. The Tigers forced three turnovers and were able to hang on late in the fourth quarter for the win. They were without defensive starter Dee Ford, Jeff Whitaker and Justin Garrett.

The Tigers' passing offense didn't wow in Malzahn's debut as head coach, but Auburn 3 headed rushing attack amassed 297 yards on the ground. Tre Mason also returned a kickoff 100 yards for a score while Corey Grant broke free for a 75-yard touchdown run. Nick Marshall finished 10-of-19 for 99 yards in his Auburn debut with 31 yards on the ground.

Star Robensen Theirize filling in for injured starter Justin Garrett won SEC Defensive Player of the week with 7 tackles and 2 interceptions, the last one preventing the game from going to overtime. Freshman DT Montravius Adams recorded a sack on his first play from scrimmage and halted several Halliday passes from his pressure.

=== Arkansas State ===
Arkansas State Red Wolves at Auburn Tigers – Game summary

| Quarter | 1 | 2 | 3 | 4 | Total |
|---|---|---|---|---|---|
| Arkansas State | 3 | 0 | 6 | 0 | 9 |
| Auburn | 14 | 7 | 7 | 10 | 38 |

at Jordan–Hare Stadium • Auburn, Alabama

- Date: September 7
- Game time: 6:30 p.m. CDT
- Game weather: Clear, 84 °F (29 °C)
- Game attendance: 83,246
- Referee: Ken Williamson
- TV announcers (SECRN): Bob Rathbun (play-by-play), Tim Couch (analyst), Elizabeth Moreau (sideline reporter)

Game information
First quarter
- AUB – Marcus Davis 18-yard pass from Nick Marshall (Cody Parkey kick), 11:37. Tigers 7–0. Drive: 10 plays, 67 yards, 3:23.
- ARST – Brian Davis 34-yard field goal, 6:54. Tigers 7–3. Drive: 14 plays, 58 yards, 4:43.
- AUB – Corey Grant 17-yard run (Cody Parkey kick), 3:56. Tigers 14–3. Drive: 8 plays, 85 yards, 2:49.

Second quarter

- AUB – Sammie Coates 68-yard pass from Nick Marshall (Cody Parkey kick), 2:20. Tigers 21–3. Drive: 3 plays, 80 yards, 1:05.

Third quarter

- ARST – Brian Davis 21-yard field goal, 9:58. Tigers 21–6. Drive: 11 plays, 71 yards, 4:56.
- ARST – Brian Davis 42-yard field goal, 7:53. Tigers 21–9. Drive: 4 plays, -8 yards, 0:58.
- AUB – Tre Mason 11-yard run (Cody Parkey kick), 1:14. Tigers 28–9. Drive: 8 plays, 54 yards, 2:54.

Fourth quarter

- AUB – Cody Parkey 35-yard field goal, 8:46. Tigers 31–9. Drive: 11 plays, 62 yards, 5:12.
- AUB – Cameron Artis-Payne 12-yard run (Cody Parkey kick), 1:43. Tigers 38–9. Drive: 7 plays, 55 yards, 2:34.

| Statistics | ARST | AUB |
|---|---|---|
| First downs | 24 | 23 |
| Total yards | 422 | 468 |
| Rushing yards | 138 | 301 |
| Passing yards | 284 | 167 |
| Turnovers | 1 | 1 |
| Time of possession | 32:54 | 27:06 |

| Team | Category | Player | Statistics |
|---|---|---|---|
| Arkansas State | Passing | Adam Kennedy | 30/42, 284 yards |
| Arkansas State | Rushing | Adam Kennedy | 12 rushes, 74 yards |
| Arkansas State | Receiving | David Oku | 6 receptions, 70 yards |
| Auburn | Passing | Nick Marshall | 10/17, 147 yards, 2 TD |
| Auburn | Rushing | Cameron Artis-Payne | 19 rushes, 102 yards, TD |
| Auburn | Receiving | Sammie Coates | 1 reception, 68 yards, TD |

QB Nick Marshall found his passing game early going 4 for 5 on his opening drive and hitting freshman wide out Marcus Davis for his first touchdown pass of his Auburn career. Arkansas State marched down the field but Auburn halted them for a field goal then the offense once again marched down the field and scored on a 17-yard touchdown run by running back Corey Grant. The offense hit a lull but Auburn's defense played bend but not break stopping them on 2 consecutive 4th down tries. Before the half after missing receiver Sammie Coates several times, Marshall connected on a 68-yard streak pass for a touchdown to build the lead to 21–3 at the half. Out of the locker room once again the Red Wolves marched the field, but Auburn's red zone defense held up and held them to a field goal. On Auburn's following possession, Marshall fumbled the ball at the Auburn 17 yard line. A big play by reserve end Justin Delaine once again forced a field goal making it 21–9. That boosted the defense confidence has they shut down the Red Wolves from then out collecting 23 QB Hurries, 13.5 tackles for loss, two sacks and a fumble recovery. Cameron Artis Payne and Tre Mason punched in touchdowns. Payne had 19 touches for 102 yards and Mason at 14 touches for 99 yards. Corey Grant finished with 40 yards on 8 touches. Nick Marshall finished 10 of 17 for 167 yards and 2 touchdowns with 53 yards rushing. He was sacked twice and fumbled the ball away once but still had no interceptions. Chris Davis lead the team on defense with 10 tackles, 1.5 tackles for loss and 3 pass break ups. Highly touted end Carl Lawson recorded his first sack and a forced fumble that was recovered by LB Jake Holland. LB Kris Frost was ejected for targeting on the QB Adam Kennedy, he played a good game after a poor game vs Washington State, he had 5 tackles at the time. Left tackle Shon Coleman after sitting out three years from a battle with leukemia came in late in the 4th quarter. Auburn outgained Arkansas State 468–422. The Red Wolves were penalized for their uniforms before kickoff.

=== Mississippi State ===
Mississippi State Bulldogs at Auburn Tigers – Game summary

| Quarter | 1 | 2 | 3 | 4 | Total |
|---|---|---|---|---|---|
| Mississippi State | 6 | 7 | 7 | 0 | 20 |
| Auburn | 11 | 3 | 3 | 7 | 24 |

at Jordan–Hare Stadium • Auburn, Alabama

- Date: September 14
- Game time: 6:00 p.m. CDT
- Game weather: Sunny, 78 °F (26 °C)
- Game attendance: 85,817
- Referee: Matt Moore
- TV announcers (ESPN2): Mark Jones (play-by-play), Brock Huard (analyst), Maria Taylor (sideline reporter)

Game information
First quarter
- AUB – Cody Parkey 40-yard field goal, 10:53. Tigers 3–0. Drive: 11 plays, 52 yards, 4:07.
- AUB – Quan Bray 76-yard pass from Nick Marshall (Ryan White pass to Brandon Fulse), 4:54. Tigers 11–0. Drive: 3 plays, 80 yards, 0:50.
- MSST – Jameon Lewis 14-yard run (run failed), 4:09. Tigers 11–6. Drive: 2 plays, 75 yards, 0:45.

Second quarter

- AUB – Cody Parkey 19-yard field goal, 13:36. Tigers 14–6. Drive: 13 plays, 73 yards, 5:33.
- MSST – Dak Prescott 5-yard run (Devon Bell kick), 5:02. Tigers 14–13. Drive: 11 plays, 84 yards, 4:36.

Third quarter

- MSST – Dak Prescott 2-yard run (Devon Bell kick), 12:38. Bulldogs 20–14. Drive: 6 plays, 75 yards, 2:22.
- AUB – Cody Parkey 47-yard field goal, 9:53. Bulldogs 20–17. Drive: 7 plays, 59 yards, 2:40.

Fourth quarter

- AUB – C. J. Uzomah 11-yard pass from Nick Marshall (Cody Parkey kick), 0:10. Tigers 24–20. Drive: 12 plays, 88 yards, 1:46.

| Statistics | MSST | AUB |
|---|---|---|
| First downs | 19 | 22 |
| Total yards | 415 | 459 |
| Rushing yards | 202 | 120 |
| Passing yards | 213 | 339 |
| Turnovers | 0 | 3 |
| Time of possession | 34:23 | 25:37 |

| Team | Category | Player | Statistics |
|---|---|---|---|
| Mississippi State | Passing | Dak Prescott | 15/28, 213 yards |
| Mississippi State | Rushing | Dak Prescott | 22 rushes, 133 yards, 2 TD |
| Mississippi State | Receiving | Robert Johnson | 4 receptions, 84 yards |
| Auburn | Passing | Nick Marshall | 23/34, 339 yards, 2 TD, 2 INT |
| Auburn | Rushing | Corey Grant | 8 rushes, 44 yards |
| Auburn | Receiving | Quan Bray | 3 receptions, 80 yards, TD |

Auburn overcame a 3-point deficit with 2:06 remaining in the game after QB Nick Marshall and WR Marcus Davis lead them down the field. Marshall went 6 for 8 on the final drive hitting Davis 4 times and he picked up a first down on a 3rd and 10 to set up the final play. An 11-yard touchdown grab by TE CJ Uzomah in the back on the end zone to go up 24–20. The defense held up for one more play. Marshall started off the game hot going 11 for 15 for 151 yards that included a 74-yard bomb to WR Quan Bray leading to a touchdown. The offense lost their rhythm and Mississippi St was able to overcome an 11–0 deficit to come back and take the lead early in the 3rd Qtr 20–14. After that the defense held Mississippi St to 23 yards on 6 possessions. Marshall got his own pass in the 3rd qtr for 37 yards after the ball got batted in the air and he spun around the defender down the sideline. Auburn's ground game was shut down only registering 120 yards as Mississippi St loaded the box. This ended Auburn's 10 game SEC losing streak.

=== At No. 6 LSU ===
Auburn Tigers at No. 6 LSU Tigers – Game summary

| Quarter | 1 | 2 | 3 | 4 | Total |
|---|---|---|---|---|---|
| Auburn | 0 | 0 | 14 | 7 | 21 |
| No. 6 LSU | 14 | 7 | 7 | 7 | 35 |

at Tiger Stadium • Baton Rouge, Louisiana

- Date: September 21
- Game time: 6:45 p.m. CDT
- Game weather: Intermittent rain, 74 °F (23 °C)
- Game attendance: 92,638
- Referee: Tom Ritter
- TV announcers (ESPN): Brad Nessler (play-by-play), Todd Blackledge (analyst), Holly Rowe (sideline reporter)

| Statistics | AUB | LSU |
|---|---|---|
| First downs | 21 | 16 |
| Total yards | 437 | 457 |
| Rushing yards | 213 | 228 |
| Passing yards | 224 | 229 |
| Turnovers | 3 | 2 |
| Time of possession | 30:49 | 29:11 |

| Team | Category | Player | Statistics |
|---|---|---|---|
| Auburn | Passing | Nick Marshall | 17/33, 224 yards, 2 INT |
| Auburn | Rushing | Tre Mason | 26 rushes, 132 yards, 2 TD |
| Auburn | Receiving | Sammie Coates | 4 receptions, 139 yards |
| LSU | Passing | Zach Mettenberger | 14/22, 229 yards, TD, INT |
| LSU | Rushing | Jeremy Hill | 25 rushes, 184 yards, 3 TD |
| LSU | Receiving | Jarvis Landry | 7 receptions, 118 yards, TD |

Two 1st quarter turnovers put Auburn in a hole 14–0 in at a wet Death Valley. Auburn trailed 21–0 at halftime but a quick interception lead to a Tre Mason touchdown run. The teams went back and forth but when it appeared place kicker Cody Parkey recovered his onside kick the refs overturned it ending it for Auburn 35–21. LSU's Jeremy Hill rushed for a career-high 184 yards and 3 rushing touchdowns. Auburn's Tre Mason had 132 yards rushing in the game.

=== No. 24 Ole Miss ===
No. 24 Ole Miss Rebels at Auburn Tigers – Game summary

| Quarter | 1 | 2 | 3 | 4 | Total |
|---|---|---|---|---|---|
| No. 24 Ole Miss | 3 | 3 | 10 | 6 | 22 |
| Auburn | 13 | 7 | 7 | 3 | 30 |

at Jordan–Hare Stadium • Auburn, Alabama

- Date: October 5
- Game time: 6:00 p.m. CDT
- Game weather: Clear, 77 °F (25 °C)
- Game attendance: 86,504
- Referee: Marc Curles
- TV announcers (ESPNU): Clay Matvick (play-by-play), Matt Stinchcomb (analyst), Dawn Davenport (sideline reporter)

| Statistics | MISS | AUB |
|---|---|---|
| First downs | 24 | 19 |
| Total yards | 464 | 375 |
| Rushing yards | 124 | 282 |
| Passing yards | 340 | 93 |
| Turnovers | 2 | 2 |
| Time of possession | 32:05 | 27:55 |

| Team | Category | Player | Statistics |
|---|---|---|---|
| Ole Miss | Passing | Bo Wallace | 25/48, 336 yards, 2 TD, 2 INT |
| Ole Miss | Rushing | Jeff Scott | 6 rushes, 66 yards |
| Ole Miss | Receiving | Donte Moncrief | 6 receptions, 122 yards, 2 TD |
| Auburn | Passing | Nick Marshall | 11/17, 93 yards |
| Auburn | Rushing | Nick Marshall | 14 rushes, 140 yards, 2 TD |
| Auburn | Receiving | Tre Mason | 3 receptions, 62 yards |

QB Nick Marshall rushed for 140 yards and 2 touchdowns and threw for 93 yards as Auburn held on after nearly blowing a big lead. Auburn raced to a 27–9 lead before Marshall injured his knee. Auburn had back to back fumbles by Tre Mason and Cameron Artist Payne, letting Ole Miss close the game to 27–22. Safety Ryan Smith with Ole Miss driving intercepted the pass and Auburn raced down the field for a field goal to go up 30–22. Auburn finished off Ole Miss with back to back sacks by DT Gabe Wright and DE Carl Lawson. Robensen Theirize had a pick six in the 1st Quarter and freshman phenom Carl Lawson recorded 6 tackles, 3.5 tackles for loss and 2 sacks. The Auburn defense finished with 6 sacks has DE Dee Ford and Gabe Wright also had 2 sacks a piece.

=== Western Carolina ===
Western Carolina Catamounts at Auburn Tigers – Game summary

| Quarter | 1 | 2 | 3 | 4 | Total |
|---|---|---|---|---|---|
| Western Carolina | 3 | 0 | 0 | 0 | 3 |
| Auburn | 21 | 21 | 14 | 6 | 62 |

at Jordan–Hare Stadium • Auburn, Alabama

- Date: October 12
- Game time: 1:00 p.m. CDT
- Game weather: Sunny, 87 °F (31 °C)
- Game attendance: 84,171
- Referee: Hubert Owens
- TV announcers (PPV): Andy Burcham (play-by-play), Gabe Gross (analyst)

| Statistics | WCU | AUB |
|---|---|---|
| First downs | 6 | 30 |
| Total yards | 173 | 712 |
| Rushing yards | 66 | 511 |
| Passing yards | 107 | 201 |
| Turnovers | 1 | 1 |
| Time of possession | 28:42 | 31:18 |

| Team | Category | Player | Statistics |
|---|---|---|---|
| Western Carolina | Passing | Eddie Sullivan | 3/11, 73 yards |
| Western Carolina | Rushing | Garrett Brown | 3 rushes, 17 yards |
| Western Carolina | Receiving | Karnorris Brown | 3 receptions, 63 yards |
| Auburn | Passing | Jeremy Johnson | 17/21, 201 yards, 4 TD, INT |
| Auburn | Rushing | Cameron Artis-Payne | 7 rushes, 133 yards, TD |
| Auburn | Receiving | Ricardo Louis | 3 receptions, 53 yards, TD |

Freshman QB Jeremy Johnson earned his first start for an injured Nick Marshall. In 2 1/2 quarters he threw for 201 yards with 4 touchdowns and a pick and he rushed for 26 yards. Auburn amassed a school record 712 yards against an overmatched Western Carolina. TE Brandon Fulse and RT Patrick Miller were suspended prior to the game.

=== At No. 7 Texas A&M ===
No. 24 Auburn Tigers at No. 7 Texas A&M Aggies – Game summary

| Quarter | 1 | 2 | 3 | 4 | Total |
|---|---|---|---|---|---|
| No. 24 Auburn | 10 | 7 | 7 | 21 | 45 |
| No. 7 Texas A&M | 14 | 10 | 7 | 10 | 41 |

at Kyle Field • College Station, Texas

- Date: October 19
- Game time: 2:30 p.m. CDT
- Game weather: Sunny, 65 °F (18 °C)
- Game attendance: 87,165
- Referee: Penn Wagers
- TV announcers (CBS): Verne Lundquist (play-by-play), Gary Danielson (color), Tracy Wolfson (sideline reporter)

| Statistics | AUB | TAMU |
|---|---|---|
| First downs | 27 | 29 |
| Total yards | 615 | 602 |
| Rushing yards | 379 | 133 |
| Passing yards | 236 | 469 |
| Turnovers | 1 | 2 |
| Time of possession | 32:16 | 27:44 |

| Team | Category | Player | Statistics |
|---|---|---|---|
| Auburn | Passing | Nick Marshall | 11/23, 236 yards, 2 TD |
| Auburn | Rushing | Tre Mason | 27 rushes, 178 yards, TD |
| Auburn | Receiving | Sammie Coates | 5 receptions, 104 yards, TD |
| Texas A&M | Passing | Johnny Manziel | 28/38, 454 yards, 4 TD, 2 INT |
| Texas A&M | Rushing | Johnny Manziel | 18 rushes, 48 yards, TD |
| Texas A&M | Receiving | Mike Evans | 11 receptions, 287 yards, 4 TD |

Auburn's defense came up with a huge final stand to upset 7th rank Texas A&M. With 1:19 left in the game Auburn held a 45–41 lead. A&M's QB Johnny Manziel completed two big pass plays to WR Mike Evans to get it down to Auburn's 18 yard line. DE Dee Ford had with an 8-yard sack then Manziel threw an incompletion. On the next play Manziel tried to run but was tackled by LB Kris Frost. Then on 4th and long Auburn Dee Ford sacked Manziel once again ending the game. QB Nick Marshall passed for 236 yards and two touchdowns, ran for 100 yards and two touchdowns, and had one fumble. Tre Mason added 178 yards rushing on 27 carries and 1 touchdown. The defenses recorded 7 tackles for loss, 3 sacks and 2 interceptions on the 3rd best offense in the nation. Ryan White who moved to safety that morning after Josh Hosley was injured recorded 5 tackles and an interception without knowing the proper alignments. Auburn's DE LaDarius Owens injured Johnny Manziel early in the 4th Quarter and he missed a series. Auburn vaulted to No. 11 in the first BCS poll of the year.

At the coin toss, Texas A&M won the toss and elected to receive to open the game. After a 6-play, 67-yard drive, A&M scored the first touchdown of the game on a 26-yard screen pass from Johnny Manziel to Mike Evans. Auburn countered that score with a 10-play, 86-yard drive on a 16-yard touchdown run by Nick Marshall. After an interception by Auburn S Ryan Smith, K Cody Parkey kicked a 27-yard field goal to take a 10–7 lead. However, in just two plays and 75 yards, Mike Evans caught another screen pass from Manziel for a 64-yard touchdown. In the second quarter, the Aggies were threatening, but Auburn CB Ryan White picked off Manziel's second interception of the game at the 4-yard line. On 4th & goal, Auburn was at the Texas A&M 5-yard line, and Tre Mason made an effort run to give Auburn a 1st & goal at the 1. After a sack by A&M, on 3rd & goal at the 13-yard line, Nick Marshall threw a strike a WR Quan Bray for a touchdown. Auburn led 17–14 after a 12-play, 96-yard drive. After a few missed opportunities by Auburn, the Aggies tacked on a 37-yard field goal by K Josh Lambo, and with :24 left in the half, Johnny Manziel threw a 42-yard touchdown to Evans to take a 24–17 lead at the half.

In the third quarter, Auburn was able to tie the game again at 24–24 on a 43-yard screen pass from Marshall to WR Sammie Coates, after a 6-play, 65-yard drive. However, once again, Manziel threw a 33-yard pass to Mike Evans for another touchdown. With the score at 31–24 at the beginning of the 4th and the Aggies threatening again, Auburn DE Ladarius Owens tackles Manziel at the Auburn 2, and Manziel injures his right shoulder. Backup QB Matt Joeckel comes into the game, and A&M is held to a 20-yard field goal by Josh Lambo for a 34–24 lead. After a 7-play, 75-yard drive made a 13-yard touchdown run by Nick Marshall, Auburn cuts the score to 34–31. The Aggies are held to a three-and-out, and Auburn caps off a 5-play, 69-yard drive with a 2-yard touchdown run by RB Cameron Artis-Payne to take a 38–34 lead. After that score, the Tigers reached over 300 yards rushing in the game. With 5:05 to go in the 4th quarter, Manziel runs in for a 1-yard touchdown run to give the Aggies a 41–38 lead. Then, in front of the 12th man, the Tigers ran the ball into a 9-man A&M defense and score on a 5-yard touchdown run by Tre Mason on a 13-play, 75-yard drive. At first, it was called as a 1st & goal, but after the booth review, Mason reach the ball over the front of the goal line, and Auburn took a 45–41 lead with 1:19 left in the game. On 4th & 13, Johnny Manziel was sacked for a 22-yard loss by Auburn DE Dee Ford, and #24 Auburn pulled the upset against the #7 Texas A&M Aggies 45–41. The Tigers topped the Aggies in yardage as well with 615 yards of offense to 602. Auburn advanced to 6–1 (3–1) and #11 in the Top 25, while A&M fell to 5–2 (2–2) and #16 in the Top 25.

=== Florida Atlantic ===
Florida Atlantic Owls at No. 11 Auburn Tigers – Game summary

| Quarter | 1 | 2 | 3 | 4 | Total |
|---|---|---|---|---|---|
| Florida Atlantic | 0 | 7 | 3 | 0 | 10 |
| No. 11 Auburn | 21 | 17 | 7 | 0 | 45 |

at Jordan–Hare Stadium • Auburn, Alabama

- Date: October 26
- Game time: 6:30 p.m. CDT
- Game weather: Clear, 58 °F (14 °C)
- Game attendance: 85,517
- Referee: Matt Austin
- TV announcers (SECRN): Bob Rathbun (play-by-play), Tim Couch (analyst), Elizabeth Moreau (sideline reporter)

| Statistics | FAU | AUB |
|---|---|---|
| First downs | 10 | 27 |
| Total yards | 247 | 628 |
| Rushing yards | 97 | 422 |
| Passing yards | 150 | 206 |
| Turnovers | 1 | 1 |
| Time of possession | 24:01 | 35:15 |

| Team | Category | Player | Statistics |
|---|---|---|---|
| Florida Atlantic | Passing | Jaquez Johnson | 9/20, 133 yards |
| Florida Atlantic | Rushing | Jaquez Johnson | 9 rushes, 58 yards, 1 TD |
| Florida Atlantic | Receiving | Daniel McKinney | 5 receptions, 64 yards |
| Auburn | Passing | Jeremy Johnson | 10/16, 192 yards, 2 TD, 1 INT |
| Auburn | Rushing | Cameron Artis-Payne | 13 rushes, 93 yards, 1 TD |
| Auburn | Receiving | Sammie Coates | 3 receptions, 133 yards, 2 TD |

Fresh off an upset win at then 7th ranked Texas A&M, the Tigers came back home and got somewhat of a break against Carl Pelini's Florida Atlantic Owls. Nick Marshall got injured in the 1st quarter and Jeremy Johnson came out for the Tigers. Even with a backup quarterback, the 11th ranked Tigers dominated a horribly overmatched Florida Atlantic team. The final score was Auburn 45, Florida Atlantic 10.

=== At Arkansas ===
No. 8 Auburn Tigers at Arkansas Razorbacks – Game summary

| Quarter | 1 | 2 | 3 | 4 | Total |
|---|---|---|---|---|---|
| No. 8 Auburn | 7 | 7 | 14 | 7 | 35 |
| Arkansas | 0 | 3 | 7 | 7 | 17 |

at Donald W. Reynolds Razorback Stadium • Fayetteville, Arkansas

- Date: November 2
- Game time: 5:00 p.m. CDT
- Game weather: Scattered clouds, 55 °F (13 °C)
- Game attendance: 66,835
- Referee: Matt Loeffler
- TV announcers (ESPN2): Joe Tessitore (play-by-play), Matt Millen (analyst), Maria Taylor (sideline reporter)

| Statistics | AUB | ARK |
|---|---|---|
| First downs | 18 | 25 |
| Total yards | 366 | 346 |
| Rushing yards | 233 | 222 |
| Passing yards | 133 | 124 |
| Turnovers | 0 | 3 |
| Time of possession | 25:46 | 34:14 |

| Team | Category | Player | Statistics |
|---|---|---|---|
| Auburn | Passing | Nick Marshall | 7/8, 118 yards, 1 TD |
| Auburn | Rushing | Tre Mason | 32 rushes, 168 yards, 4 TD |
| Auburn | Receiving | Sammie Coates | 3 receptions, 102 yards, 1 TD |
| Arkansas | Passing | Brandon Allen | 10/22, 112 yards, 1 TD |
| Arkansas | Rushing | Jonathan Williams | 15 rushes, 104 yards |
| Arkansas | Receiving | Keon Hatcher | 4 receptions, 50 yards, 1 TD |

Auburn came to Fayetteville with their first AP Top 10 ranking since 2010. Their opponent was Arkansas, who was on a five-game losing streak. Tre Mason earned SEC Offensive Player of the Week honors for his performance, which consisted of 32 carries for 168 yards and four touchdowns. Arkansas never led during that game, as Auburn lead 14–3 at halftime and cruised to a 35–17 win. Referee Matt Loeffler got hurt late in the game, so Ken Williamson took over for the rest of the game.

=== Tennessee ===
No. 7 Auburn Tigers at Tennessee Volunteers – Game summary

| Quarter | 1 | 2 | 3 | 4 | Total |
|---|---|---|---|---|---|
| No. 7 Auburn | 6 | 28 | 14 | 7 | 55 |
| Tennessee | 6 | 14 | 3 | 0 | 23 |

at Neyland Stadium • Knoxville, Tennessee

- Date: November 9
- Game time: 11:00 a.m. CDT / 12:00 p.m. EDT
- Game weather: Partly cloudy, 53 °F (12 °C)
- Game attendance: 102,455
- Referee: David Smith
- TV announcers (ESPN): Dave Pasch (play-by-play), Brian Griese (analyst), Tom Luginbill (sideline reporter)

| Statistics | AUB | TENN |
|---|---|---|
| First downs | 25 | 18 |
| Total yards | 479 | 354 |
| Rushing yards | 444 | 226 |
| Passing yards | 35 | 128 |
| Turnovers | 2 | 1 |
| Time of possession | 27:27 | 31:06 |

| Team | Category | Player | Statistics |
|---|---|---|---|
| Auburn | Passing | Nick Marshall | 3/7, 35 yards, 1 TD, 1 INT |
| Auburn | Rushing | Nick Marshall | 14 rushes, 214 yards, 2 TD |
| Auburn | Receiving | C.J. Uzomah | 1 reception, 25 yards, 1 TD |
| Tennessee | Passing | Joshua Dobbs | 16/25, 128 yards, 1 INT |
| Tennessee | Rushing | Rajion Neal | 20 rushes, 124 yards, 1 TD |
| Tennessee | Receiving | Marquez North | 5 receptions, 58 yards |

After being ranked in the AP Top 10 the previous week, Auburn finally got into the BCS Top 10 after a 35–17 win over Arkansas. Their next contest was a trip to Tennessee. After a shaky 1st quarter, which was tied 6–6 at the end, Auburn dominated the last 3 quarters of the game, outscoring Tennessee 49–17 the rest of the way. The final score was Auburn 55, Tennessee 23.

=== No. 25 Georgia ===
No. 25 Georgia Bulldogs at No. 7 Auburn Tigers – Game summary

| Quarter | 1 | 2 | 3 | 4 | Total |
|---|---|---|---|---|---|
| No. 25 Georgia | 0 | 10 | 7 | 21 | 38 |
| No. 7 Auburn | 10 | 17 | 7 | 9 | 43 |

at Jordan–Hare Stadium • Auburn, Alabama

- Date: November 16
- Game time: 2:30 p.m. CST
- Game weather: Overcast, 66 °F (19 °C)
- Game attendance: 87,451
- Referee: Penn Wagers
- TV announcers (CBS): Verne Lundquist (play-by-play), Gary Danielson (analyst), Tracy Wolfson (sideline reporter)

| Statistics | UGA | AUB |
|---|---|---|
| First downs | 29 | 29 |
| Total yards | 532 | 566 |
| Rushing yards | 117 | 323 |
| Passing yards | 415 | 243 |
| Turnovers | 1 | 0 |
| Time of possession | 25:03 | 34:57 |

| Team | Category | Player | Statistics |
|---|---|---|---|
| Georgia | Passing | Aaron Murray | 33/49, 415 yards, 2 TD, 1 INT |
| Georgia | Rushing | Todd Gurley | 15 rushes, 79 yards, 1 TD |
| Georgia | Receiving | Rantavious Wooten | 5 receptions, 99 yards, 1 TD |
| Auburn | Passing | Nick Marshall | 15/26, 229 yards, 1 TD |
| Auburn | Rushing | Tre Mason | 27 rushes, 115 yards, 1 TD |
| Auburn | Receiving | Ricardo Louis | 4 receptions, 131 yards, 1 TD |

The #7 Auburn Tigers hosted the #25 Georgia Bulldogs in Auburn. Auburn led 37–17 in the 4th quarter, but Georgia quarterback Aaron Murray led the Bulldogs to three straight touchdowns to take the lead 38–37 with less than 2 minutes to go. On 4th and 18, Auburn quarterback Nick Marshall, who was a defensive back for Georgia during the 2011 season, threw a Hail Mary pass, which was tipped by Georgia safety Josh Harvey-Clemons, right into the hands of Auburn sophomore wide receiver Ricardo Louis, scoring the game-winning touchdown with 25 seconds to go. Auburn's defense then held off Murray's late rally to win the game, 43–38.

Rod Bramblett, radio personality and voice of the Auburn Tigers, made the following call:

"Here's your ballgame. Nick Marshall stands in, steps up. Gonna throw down field just a home run ball and, uh, it is tip upped—and Louis caught it on the deflection! Louis is gonna score! Louis is gonna score! Louis is gonna score! Touchdown Auburn! Touchdown Auburn! A miracle in Jordan–Hare! A miracle in Jordan–Hare! 73 yards! And the Tigers with 25 seconds to go lead 43 to 38!"

=== No. 1 Alabama ===
No. 1 Alabama Crimson Tide at No. 4 Auburn Tigers – Game summary

| Quarter | 1 | 2 | 3 | 4 | Total |
|---|---|---|---|---|---|
| No. 1 Alabama | 0 | 21 | 0 | 7 | 28 |
| No. 4 Auburn | 7 | 7 | 7 | 13 | 34 |

at Jordan–Hare Stadium • Auburn, Alabama

- Date: November 30
- Game time: 2:30 p.m. CST
- Game weather: Sunny, 57 °F (14 °C)
- Game attendance: 87,451
- Referee: Matt Austin
- TV announcers (CBS): Verne Lundquist (play-by-play), Gary Danielson (analyst), Tracy Wolfson (sideline reporter)

Game information
First quarter
- AUB – Nick Marshall 45-yard run (Cody Parkey kick), 5:05. Crimson Tide 7–0. Drive: 7 plays, 66 yards, 3:26.

Second quarter

- ALA – Jalston Fowler 3-yard pass from A. J. McCarron (Cade Foster kick), 11:00. Tied 7–7. Drive: 11 plays, 67 yards, 4:33.
- ALA – Kevin Norwood 20-yard pass from A. J. McCarron (Cade Foster kick), 7:12. Crimson Tide 14–7. Drive: 4 plays, 36 yards, 1:57.
- ALA – T. J. Yeldon 1-yard run (Cade Foster kick), 3:48. Crimson Tide 21–7. Drive: 5 plays, 56 yards, 1:41.
- AUB – Tre Mason 1-yard run (Cody Parkey kick), 1:40. Crimson Tide 21–14. Drive: 7 plays, 81 yards, 2:02.

Third quarter

- AUB – C. J. Uzomah 13-yard pass from Nick Marshall (Cody Parkey kick), 11:56. Tied 21–21. Drive: 9 plays, 69 yards, 2:57.

Fourth quarter

- ALA – Amari Cooper 99-yard pass from A. J. McCarron (Cade Foster kick), 10:28. Crimson Tide 28–21. Drive: 1 play, 99 yards, 0:14.
- AUB – Sammie Coates 39-yard pass from Nick Marshall (Cody Parkey kick), 0:32. Tied 28–28. Drive: 7 plays, 83 yards, 2:00.
- AUB – Chris Davis 100-yard missed field goal return, 0:00. Tigers 34–28.

| Statistics | ALA | AUB |
|---|---|---|
| First downs | 19 | 22 |
| Total yards | 495 | 393 |
| Rushing yards | 218 | 296 |
| Passing yards | 277 | 97 |
| Turnovers | 0 | 1 |
| Time of possession | 30:54 | 29:06 |

| Team | Category | Player | Statistics |
|---|---|---|---|
| Alabama | Passing | A. J. McCarron | 17/29, 277 yards, 3 TD |
| Alabama | Rushing | T. J. Yeldon | 26 rushes, 141 yards, TD |
| Alabama | Receiving | Amari Cooper | 6 receptions, 178 yards, TD |
| Auburn | Passing | Nick Marshall | 11/16, 97 yards, 2 TD |
| Auburn | Rushing | Tre Mason | 29 rushes, 164 yards, TD |
| Auburn | Receiving | Sammie Coates | 2 receptions, 60 yards, TD |

In what has been dubbed "The Kick Six", Auburn was looking to avenge two consecutive losses to Alabama. The Tigers had lost 42–14 in 2011 and 49–0 in 2012. Going into the game, Alabama had been ranked atop the polls all season, while Auburn was fourth in all major polls, making this the highest combined ranking ever in the Iron Bowl. Alabama struggled in the field goal kicking game all day, with kicker Cade Foster missing from 44 yards and 33 yards, and having one partially blocked from 44. With seven seconds left in regulation and the score tied at 28, Alabama's T. J. Yeldon made a long run as time expired. The play was reviewed from the replay booth, and one second was put back on the clock after finding Yeldon had actually gone out of bounds just before the end of regulation. Alabama opted to attempt a game-winning 57-yard field goal, but chose Freshman kicker Adam Griffith over Foster due to Foster's woes that day. Alabama missed its fourth field goal of the day with Griffith's attempt falling short. Auburn's Chris Davis fielded it nine yards deep in his own end zone, and with no Crimson Tide skill players in his path (the field goal unit was made up almost entirely of offensive linemen), sprinted for a 109-yard touchdown and a 34–28 Auburn win. Under NCAA scoring rules, Davis was only credited for 100 yards on the play. The win gave the Tigers the SEC West title and completed one of the biggest single-season turnarounds in SEC history; they had gone 0–8 in conference play a year earlier. It also all but ended Alabama's hopes for a third straight national title. With this win, Auburn clinched the SEC West and kept their national championship hopes alive.

=== Vs. No. 5 Missouri (SEC Championship Game) ===
2013 SEC Championship Game
No. 5 Missouri Tigers vs. No. 3 Auburn Tigers – Game summary

| Quarter | 1 | 2 | 3 | 4 | Total |
|---|---|---|---|---|---|
| No. 5 Missouri | 10 | 17 | 15 | 0 | 42 |
| No. 3 Auburn | 14 | 14 | 17 | 14 | 59 |

at Georgia Dome • Atlanta

- Date: December 7
- Game time: 3:00 p.m. CST / 4:00 p.m. EST
- Game weather: Indoors
- Game attendance: 75,632
- Referee: Hubert Owens
- TV announcers (CBS): Verne Lundquist (play-by-play), Gary Danielson (analyst), Tracy Wolfson (sideline reporter)

| Statistics | MIZ | AUB |
|---|---|---|
| First downs | 22 | 30 |
| Total yards | 534 | 677 |
| Rushing yards | 231 | 545 |
| Passing yards | 303 | 132 |
| Turnovers | 1 | 2 |
| Time of possession | 25:40 | 34:20 |

| Team | Category | Player | Statistics |
|---|---|---|---|
| Missouri | Passing | James Franklin | 21/37, 303 yards, 3 TD, 1 INT |
| Missouri | Rushing | Henry Josey | 9 rushes, 123 yards |
| Missouri | Receiving | Dorial Green-Beckham | 6 receptions, 144 yards, 2 TD |
| Auburn | Passing | Nick Marshall | 9/11, 132 yards, 1 TD |
| Auburn | Rushing | Tre Mason | 46 rushes, 304 yards, 4 TD |
| Auburn | Receiving | Sammie Coates | 6 receptions, 94 yards, 1 TD |

Auburn's offense ran all over Missouri in a back and forth ball game, until Mizzou ran out of gas in the 4th quarter. Auburn ran for a SEC Title game record of 536 yards on the ground. RB Tre Mason set all rushing records with 304 yards on 46 touches with 4 touchdowns. QB Nick Marshall added 101 yards on the ground. Auburn opened the game with the ball but after a 1st down Marshall was stripped by Kony Ealy setting up Mizzou to go up 3–0. Auburn came right back quickly with a 38-yard strike to WR Sammie Coates for a touchdown. Missouri answered with a 28-yard strike to Dorial Green-Beckham; a catch that was dropped but Auburn never challenged. Auburn quickly answered after a 54-yard jailbreak screen to Sammie Coates and a 9-yard Marshall touchdown run. Kony Ealy stripped Marshall again and cornerback E.J. Gaines returned the fumble for a touchdown to go up 17–14. Auburn marched right down the field and scored on a 7-yard run by Mason. Missouri kicked a field goal to make the score 21–20. But Mason took off for a 52-yard run and finished up the scoring drive with a 3-yard run. Missouri struck right before the half, as Green-Beckham got loose to make it 28–27. Missouri took a 34–31 lead in the 3rd quarter, but then Auburn took over the game by outscoring them 28–8. Corey Grant scored on an 8-yard run after a 42-yard run by Marshall. Auburn's defense forced a 3-and-out, and Cameron Artis-Payne scored on a 15-yard run. Missouri scored quickly after a 65-yard run by Henry Josey and completed the two point conversion to make it 45–42. Auburn struck quickly again with a 43-yard run by Grant and 23-yard pass to Trovon Reed that was capped by 1-yard touchdown run by Mason. Mason's final touchdown run put the game on ice, 59–42. Later that night Michigan State defeated Ohio State, making it possible for Auburn to play Florida State for the national title. Auburn was the lowest rated pre-season team to ever make it to the title. They were not even in the top 50 and many pundits predicted only 4 to 6 wins.

=== Vs. No. 1 Florida State (BCS National Championship Game) ===
2014 BCS National Championship Game
No. 2 Auburn Tigers vs. No. 1 Florida State Seminoles – Game summary

| Quarter | 1 | 2 | 3 | 4 | Total |
|---|---|---|---|---|---|
| No. 2 Auburn | 7 | 14 | 0 | 10 | 31 |
| No. 1 Florida State | 3 | 7 | 3 | 21 | 34 |

at Rose Bowl • Pasadena, California

- Date: January 6, 2014
- Game time: 7:30 p.m. CST / 5:30 p.m. PST
- Game weather: Partly cloudy, 69 °F (21 °C)
- Game attendance: 94,208
- Referee: John O'Neill
- TV announcers (ESPN): Brent Musburger (play-by-play), Kirk Herbstreit (analyst), Heather Cox and Tom Rinaldi (sideline reporters)

Game information
First quarter
- FSU – Roberto Aguayo 35-yard field goal, 9:53. Seminoles 3–0. Drive: 9 plays, 59 yards, 3:38.
- AUB – Tre Mason 12-yard run (Cody Parkey kick), 3:07. Tigers 7–3. Drive: 6 plays, 25 yards, 2:11.

Second quarter

- AUB – Melvin Ray 50-yard pass from Nick Marshall (Cody Parkey kick), 13:48. Tigers 14–3. Drive: 3 plays, 85 yards, 1:01.
- AUB – Nick Marshall 4-yard run (Cody Parkey kick), 5:01. Tigers 21–3. Drive: 6 plays, 27 yards, 2:19.
- FSU – Devonta Freeman 3-yard run (Roberto Aguayo kick), 1:28. Tigers 21–10. Drive: 11 plays, 66 yards, 3:27.

Third quarter

- FSU – Roberto Aguayo 41-yard field goal, 6:05. Tigers 21–13. Drive: 11 plays, 67 yards, 5:30.

Fourth quarter

- FSU – Chad Abram 11-yard pass from Jameis Winston (Roberto Aguayo kick), 10:55. Tigers 21–20. Drive: 5 plays, 56 yards, 2:01.
- AUB – Cody Parkey 22-yard field goal, 4:42. Tigers 24–20. Drive: 13 plays, 69 yards, 6:13.
- FSU – Kermit Whitfield 100-yard kickoff return (Roberto Aguayo kick), 4:31. Seminoles 27–24.
- AUB – Tre Mason 37-yard run (Cody Parkey kick), 1:19. Tigers 31–27. Drive: 8 plays, 75 yards, 3:12.
- FSU – Kelvin Benjamin 2-yard pass from Jameis Winston (Roberto Aguayo kick), 0:13. Seminoles 34–31. Drive: 7 plays, 80 yards, 0:58.

| Statistics | AUB | FSU |
|---|---|---|
| First downs | 25 | 19 |
| Total yards | 449 | 385 |
| Rushing yards | 232 | 148 |
| Passing yards | 217 | 237 |
| Turnovers | 1 | 1 |
| Time of possession | 33:41 | 26:19 |

| Team | Category | Player | Statistics |
|---|---|---|---|
| Auburn | Passing | Nick Marshall | 14/27, 217 yards, 2 TD, INT |
| Auburn | Rushing | Tre Mason | 34 rushes, 195 yards, TD |
| Auburn | Receiving | Sammie Coates | 4 receptions, 61 yards |
| Florida State | Passing | Jameis Winston | 20/35, 237 yards, 2 TD |
| Florida State | Rushing | Devonta Freeman | 11 rushes, 73 yards, TD |
| Florida State | Receiving | Rashad Greene | 9 receptions, 147 yards |

The BCS National Title Game featured the Auburn Tigers, and the Florida State Seminoles. Despite Florida State taking a 3–0 lead early, Auburn was dominant most of the first half. With the help of a well-executed play action pass game, Auburn was able to throw against Florida State's top-ranked defense in the first half. A screen to Tre Mason, a deep pass to Melvin Ray and a Nick Marshall run put the Tigers up 21–3.However, the Seminoles scored on their last drive of the half, after a fake punt and Jameis Winston scramble. Devonta Freeman ran it in for a 1-yard touchdown. Florida State also scored the only points of the third quarter, a Roberto Aguayo field goal. Early in the fourth, a Nick Marshall pass was intercepted, resulting in a ten-yard touchdown pass from Winston to Chad Abram. Auburn responded however, taking a 4-point lead after a Cody Parkey field goal. Then in a shocking turn of events, Levonte Whitfield ran the following kickoff back 100 yards to give the Seminoles a 27–24 lead. Three minutes later, Auburn's Tre Mason broke away on stretch play making it 31–27 with 1:19 left on the clock. Florida State went 57 yards on two plays, both Winston passes to Rashad Greene. After moving the ball closer to the endzone, Florida State found themselves at a 3rd and 8. Winston's pass was incomplete, but a penalty was called on Chris Davis that gave Florida State a 1st and goal. The following play, Jameis Winston completed a 2-yard pass to Kelvin Benjamin for a touchdown. Auburn was unable to score on the next drive and Florida State won, ending Auburn's dream season as well as the SEC's streak of seven consecutive BCS titles.

== Personnel ==
=== Coaching staff ===
| Name | Position | Alma mater | Year Entering |
|---|---|---|---|
| Gus Malzahn | Head Coach | Henderson State | 1st |
| Rodney Garner | Associate head coach/Defensive Line/recruiting coordinator | Auburn | 1st |
| Rhett Lashlee | Offensive coordinator/quarterbacks | Arkansas | 1st |
| Dameyune Craig | Wide Receivers/co-offensive coordinator | Auburn | 1st |
| Ellis Johnson | Defensive coordinator/Linebackers | The Citadel | 1st |
| Charlie Harbison | Safeties/co-defensive coordinator | Gardner–Webb | 1st |
| Scott Fountain | Tight ends/Special teams coordinator | Samford | 1st |
| Tim Horton | Running backs | Arkansas | 1st |
| J.B. Grimes | Offensive Line | Henderson State | 1st |
| Melvin Smith | Cornerbacks | Millsaps College | 1st |
| Ryan Russell | Head Strength and Conditioning Coach | Auburn | 1st |
| Jonathan Brewer | Graduate assistant | Arkansas | 1st |

=== Roster ===
**2013 Auburn Tigers roster**
| **Quarterbacks**: 6 **Jeremy Johnson** – Freshman; 12 **Jonathan Wallace** – Sophomore; 14 **Nick Marshall** – Junior; 16 Tucker Tuberville – Freshman; 17 Ben Durand – Sophomore; **Running backs**: 20 **Corey Grant** – (redshirt) Junior; 21 **Tre Mason** – Junior; 23 **Johnathan Ford** – Freshman; 25 **Peyton Barber** – Freshman; 41 Patrick Lymon – Junior; 42 Chandler Shakespeare – Senior; 44 **Cameron Artis-Payne** – Junior; 45 Andrew Williams – Sophomore; **Wide receivers**: 1 **Trovon Reed** – (redshirt) Junior; 3 **Dominic Walker** – Freshman; 4 **Quan Bray** – Junior; 5 **Ricardo Louis** – Sophomore; 8 **Tony Stevens** – Freshman; 18 **Sammie Coates** – (redshirt) Sophomore; 25 **Kiehl Frazier** – Junior; 31 Mark White – Freshman; 33 Austin Powell – Junior; 39 B.J. Trimble – Junior; 80 **Marcus Davis** – Freshman; 82 Melvin Ray – Sophomore; 84 Cade Hoffman – Freshman; 86 Dimitri Reese – Sophomore; 87 Gray King – Freshman; 89 **Jaylon Denson** – Junior; **Tight ends**/**H-back**: 11 **Brandon Fulse** – Junior; 32 Wade Norberg – Junior; 35 **Jay Prosch** – Senior; 40 Gage Batten – Freshman; 47 Spencer Smith – Freshman; 49 Patrick Young – Junior; 81 **C. J. Uzomah** – Junior; 83 Michael Clifton – Freshman; 85 Wirth Campbell – Sophomore | **Offensive line**: 50 **Reese Dismukes** – Junior; 51 **Patrick Miller** – Sophomore; 53 **Devonte Danzey** – Sophomore; 56 **Avery Young** – (redshirt) Freshman; 62 **Chad Slade** – (redshirt) Junior; 63 **Alex Kozan** – (redshirt) Freshman; 65 **Tunde Fariyike** – (redshirt) Junior; 66 Kevin Austin – Freshman; 68 Kyle Bolstad – Freshman; 70 **Robert Leff** – (redshirt) Freshman; 72 **Shon Coleman** – (redshirt) Freshman; 73 **Greg Robinson** – (redshirt) Sophomore; 74 **Will Adams** – (redshirt) Freshman; 75 **Deon Mix** – Freshman; 76 **Jordan Diamond** – (redshirt) Freshman; 77 **Shane Callahan** – (redshirt) Freshman; 78 Colton Wingard – Sophomore; 79 Eric Averett – Freshman; 96 Aaron Garrison – Freshman; **Defensive line**: 1 **Montravius Adams** – Freshman; 13 **Craig Sanders** – Senior; 30 **Dee Ford** – (redshirt) Senior; 42 **Gimel President** – (redshirt) Freshman; 45 **Keymiya Harrell** – (redshirt) Sophomore; 50 **Ben Bradley** – Sophomore; 52 **Justin DeLaine** – (redshirt) Junior; 54 **Jeffrey Whitaker** – Senior; 55 **Carl Lawson** – Freshman; 60 Jackson Thomas – Freshman; 90 **Gabe Wright** – Junior; 91 **Tyler Nero** – (redshirt) Freshman; 92 **Kenneth Carter** – Senior; 93 **JaBrian Niles** – (redshirt) Sophomore; 94 **Nosa Eguae** – (redshirt) Senior; 95 Reid Brooks – Freshman; 97 **Elijah Daniel** – Freshman; 98 **Angelo Blackson** – Junior; 99 Brian Walsh – Sophomore | **Linebackers**: 5 **Jake Holland** – Senior; 8 **Cassanova McKinzy** – Sophomore; 10 **LaDarius Owens** – (redshirt) Junior; 17 **Kris Frost** – (redshirt) Sophomore; 18 **JaViere Mitchell** – (redshirt) Freshman; 33 **Kenny Flowers** – Sophomore; 44 **Anthony Swain** – (redshirt) Sophomore; 47 **Cameron Toney** – Freshman; 57 Grant Smith – Freshman; **Defensive backs**: 3 **Jonathan Jones** – Sophomore; 6 **Jonathon Mincy** – (redshirt) Junior; 9 **Jermaine Whitehead** – Junior; 11 **Chris Davis Jr.** – Senior; 15 **Joshua Holsey** – Sophomore; 19 **Ryan White** – Senior; 21 **Mackenro Alexander** – Freshman; 22 **Khari Harding** – Freshman; 23 Mack VanGorder – Sophomore; 24 **Ryan Smith** – Senior; 26 **Justin Garrett** – Junior; 27 **Robenson Therezie** – Junior; 28 **T.J. Davis** – (redshirt) Freshman; 29 **Brandon King** – Junior; 31 **Trent Fisher** – Junior; 32 Blake Poole – Senior; 37 **Kamryn Melton** – Freshman; 38 Adam Dyas – Junior; 43 Jordan Spriggs – Junior; 58 Luke Ebbesmeyer – Freshman | **Kickers**: 36 **Cody Parkey** – Senior; 38 **Daniel Carlson** – Freshman; 39 Alex Kviklys – Sophomore; 64 Duncan McKinney – Sophomore; **Punters**: 28 **Jimmy Hutchinson** – Freshman; 29 Tyler Stovall – Freshman; 30 **Steven Clark** – Senior; **Long snappers**: 59 **Jake Lembke** – Senior |
Sources: 2013 Auburn Tigers football roster **Bold** indicates scholarship player

=== Depth chart ===
**Defense**

FS
Jermaine Whitehead
Trent Fisher
⋅

| WLB | MLB | SLB |
|---|---|---|
| Cassanova McKinzy; Anthony Swain | Jake Holland | Justin Garret |
| ⋅ | Kris Frost | Robenson Therezie |
| ⋅ | JaViere Mitchell | ⋅ |

SS
Ryan Smith
Ryan White
⋅

CB
Jonathan Mincy
Jonathan Jones
⋅

| DE | DT | DT | DE |
|---|---|---|---|
| LaDarius Owens | Gabe Wright | Nosa Eguae | Dee Ford |
| Carl Lawson | Ben Bradley | Montravius Adams | Elijah Daniels |
| ⋅ | ⋅ | ⋅ | ⋅ |

CB
Chris Davis
Jonathan Ford
Joshua Holsey

**Offense**

WR
Sammie Coates
Melvin Ray
⋅

WR
Trovon Reed
Marcus Davis
⋅

| LT | LG | C | RG | RT |
|---|---|---|---|---|
| Greg Robinson | Alex Kozan | Reese Dismukes | Chad Slade | Avery Young |
| Shon Coleman | Devonte Danzey | Tunde Fariyike | Jordan Diamond | Patrick Miller |
| ⋅ | ⋅ | ⋅ | ⋅ | ⋅ |

TE
C.J. Uzomah
Brandon Fulse
Jay Prosch

WR
Quan Bray
Ricardo Louis
⋅

QB
Nick Marshall
Jeremy Johnson
Jonathan Wallace

RB
Tre Mason
Cameron Artis-Payne
Corey Grant

Special teams
**PK** Cody Parkey
**PK** Daniel Carlson
**P** Steven Clarke
**P** Jimmy Hutchinson
**KR** Corey Grant
**PR** Chris Davis
**LS** Forrest Hill
**H** Ryan White

Injuries

- WR 89 Jaylon Denson (torn patellar tendon vs LSU out for season)-former starter
- S 15 Joshua Holsey (torn ACL before Texas A&M out for season)-former starter
- DT 54 Jeffery Whitaker (preseason surgery-medical redshirt)-former starter
- LB 26 Justin Garrett (preseason injury-medical redshirt)-former starter

== Awards ==
- December 23, 2013 – Auburn head coach Gus Malzahn was named AP's coach of the year

== Players drafted into the NFL ==
| Round | Pick | Player | Position | NFL club |
|---|---|---|---|---|
| 1 | 23 | Dee Ford | DE | Kansas City Chiefs |
| 1 | 2 | Greg Robinson | OT | St. Louis Rams |
| 3 | 75 | Tre Mason | RB | St. Louis Rams |
| 6 | 222 | Jay Prosch | FB | Houston Texans |

Additionally, two players were signed as undrafted free agents:

| Name | Position | Team |
|---|---|---|
| Chris Davis | CB | San Diego Chargers |
| Cody Parkey | K | Indianapolis Colts |
