= Jay Prosch =

American football player (born 1992)

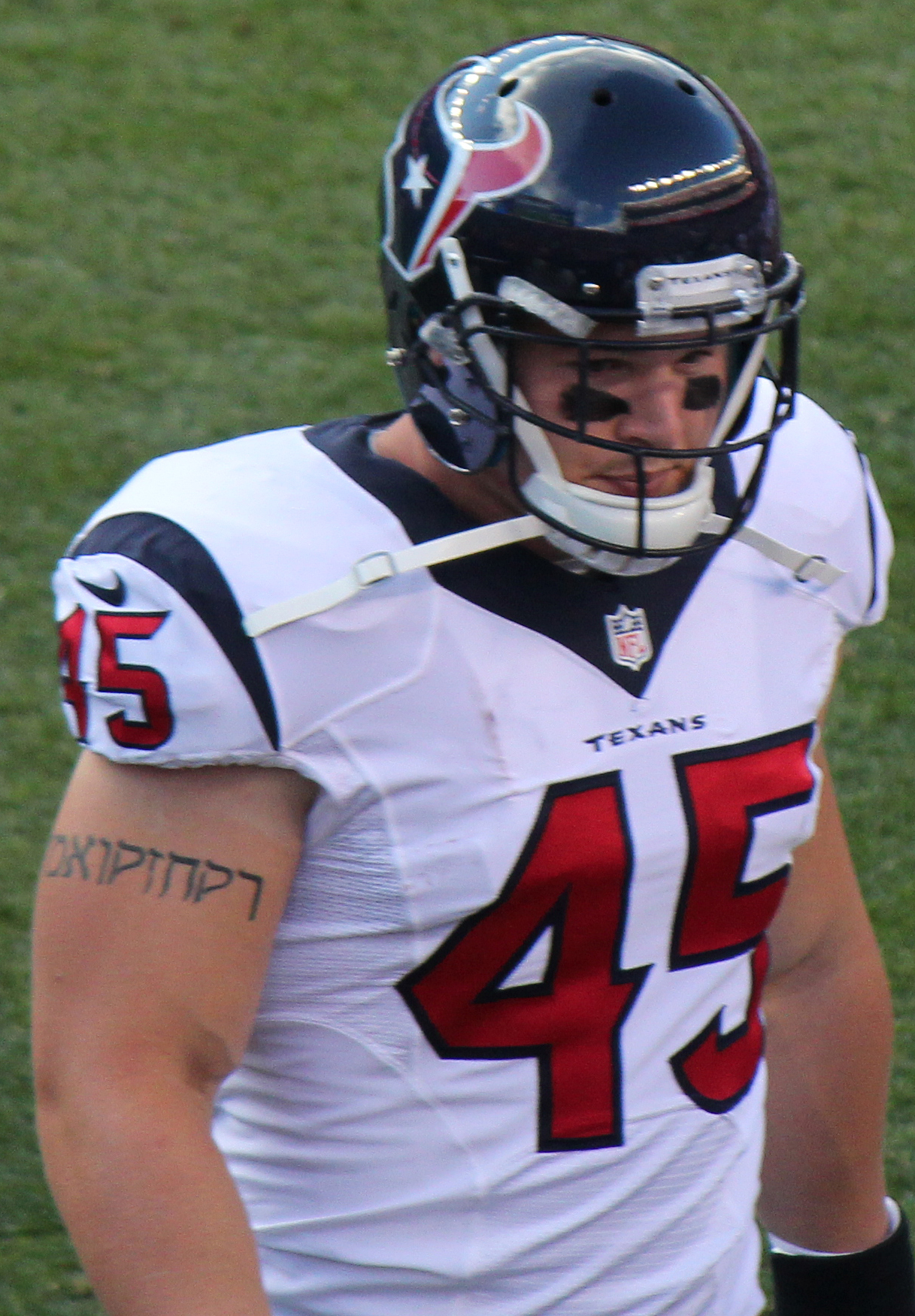
- Prosch with the Houston Texans in 2014

No. 45
- Position: Fullback

Personal information
- Born: August 21, 1992 (age 34); Saraland, Alabama, U.S.
- Listed height: 6 ft 1 in (1.85 m)
- Listed weight: 256 lb (116 kg)

Career information
- High school: UMS-Wright (Mobile, Alabama)
- College: Auburn
- NFL draft: 2014: 6th round, 211th overall pick

Career history
- Houston Texans (2014–2017)

Career NFL statistics
- Receptions: 6
- Receiving yards: 61
- Rushing attempts: 10
- Rushing yards: 42
- Stats at Pro Football Reference

Jay Prosch (born August 21, 1992) is an American former professional football player who was a fullback in the National Football League (NFL). He was selected by the Houston Texans in the sixth round of the 2014 NFL draft. He played college football for the Illinois Fighting Illini and Auburn Tigers.

== Early life ==
Prosch attended UMS-Wright Preparatory School in Mobile, Alabama, where he played football as a linebacker and ran track. He was named first-team ASWA 4A All-State selection at offensive line as a junior, as he helped lead UMS-Wright Bulldogs to the 4A AHSAA state championship, and served as team captain. He was used as a fullback in short yardage situations. As a senior, he recorded 199 total tackles, 114 solo stops, 16 for loss, five pass breakups, and one sack, and was named first-team ASWA 4A All-State selection at linebacker and the 4A Lineman of the Year by the Alabama Sports Writers Association. He played in the Alabama/Mississippi All-Star game.

In track & field, he competed in the discus, javelin and as a shot putter. He got a personal-record of 44.23 meters in the javelin at the 2008 Southeastern Relays, placing 4th. He placed 7th in the shot put event at the 2009 AHSAA 4A-6A State Meet, with a career-best throw of 13.17 meters. At the 2010 Lionell Newell Throws and Fast Times, he recorded a personal-best throw of 43.46 meters in the discus, placing 2nd in the finals.

== College career ==
Prosch started his college football career at the University of Illinois. Prior to his junior season in 2012, he transferred to Auburn University to be closer to his mother, who had been diagnosed with brain cancer. He received an NCAA waiver in January for the ability to transfer to Auburn.

== Professional career ==
=== Pre-draft ===
On December 13, 2013, it was reported that Prosch had received and accepted an invitation to play in the 2014 Senior Bowl. He had a productive week of practice and showcased his athleticism and receiving ability. On January 25, 2014, Prosch played in the Senior Bowl and was a part of the South team which included Auburn teammates Dee Ford, Chris Davis, and Sammie Coates. He helped the South defeat the North, 20–10. Although he was considered a top fullback prospect, Prosch was not one of the three fullbacks who received an invitation to the NFL Combine (Trey Millard, J. C. Copeland, and Ryan Hewitt). On March 3, 2014, Prosch opted to participate at Auburn's pro day along with Greg Robinson, Dee Ford, Chris Davis, Tre Mason, Cody Parkey, Sammie Coates, Quan Bray, and nine other teammates. His 4.72 in the 40-yard dash would've finished fifth among tight ends at the NFL combine and his 27 reps on the bench press would've finished first among tight ends. Prosch's projections from NFL draft experts and scouts ranged from the fifth round to the seventh round or priority undrafted free agent. This was due to how scarcely fullbacks are drafted and how the majority of teams who used fullbacks already had an established fullback. He was ranked the top fullback prospect by NFLDraftScout.com.

Pre-draft measurables
Height	Weight	40-yard dash	10-yard split	20-yard split	20-yard shuttle	Three-cone drill	Vertical jump	Broad jump	Bench press
6 ft 1 in (1.85 m)	254 lb (115 kg)	4.72 s	1.70 s	2.75 s	4.40 s	7.33 s	32 in (0.81 m)	9 ft 1 in (2.77 m)	27 reps
All values from Auburn's Pro Day

=== 2014 ===
The Houston Texans selected Prosch in the sixth round (211th overall) of the 2014 NFL draft. He was the first of only two fullbacks selected in the 2014 NFL Draft, the other being Trey Millard (7th round, 245th overall).

On May 16, 2014, the Texans signed Prosch to a four-year, $2.29 million contract that includes a signing bonus of $78,680.

Prosch competed with Brad Smelley and Toben Opurum throughout training camp for the vacant starting fullback job left by the departure of Greg Jones. On August 5, 2014, he suffered a broken hand during practice and missed the first two preseason games. The injury required surgery, where Prosch had multiple pins placed in his hand. Throughout the recovery process, Prosch still participated in practice and was praised by head coach Bill O'Brien for his toughness. O'Brien named him the starting fullback to start the 2014 regular season.

Prosch made his professional regular season debut and first career start in the [Texans' season-opening 17–6 victory over the Washington Redskins. On September 28, 2014. he made his first career reception on a 14-yard pass from Ryan Fitzpatrick in a 23–17 victory over the Buffalo Bills. He was used in 25% of the offensive plays during his rookie season. He appeared in 16 games and started five.

=== 2015 ===
Prosch returned as the definitive starting fullback for the beginning of the 2015 season. On September 27, 2015, Prosch had a season-high three carries for 24 yards during the Texans' 19–9 victory over the Tampa Bay Buccaneers. With Arian Foster being injured for the majority of the season after suffering a ruptured Achilles tendon in Week 7, Prosch was the lead blocker for Alfred Blue. He appeared in all 16 games and started two games.

=== 2016 ===
Prosch began blocking for Lamar Miller in 2016 after Arian Foster departed during the off-season. He finished the season with four carries for nine yards and started one of the 15 games he appeared in.

=== 2017 ===
On August 31, 2017, Prosch signed a three-year, $5.75 million contract extension with the Texans. He appeared in 16 games and started five in the 2017 season.

On September 1, 2018, Prosch was released by the Texans.

== Personal life ==
Prosch was raised by his parents, Jerry and Iris Prosch, and has three older sisters. His mother was diagnosed brain cancer during his 2011 season at Illinois and suffered from dementia as a result of the cancer. He was raised in Mobile, Alabama. Prosch's mother died of the disease in September 2012. She slipped into coma the day Prosch made his debut with the Tigers against Clemson. His father died April 2015. Prosch also has two dogs named Levi and Ruger. He has multiple tattoos, including an iris with the words: "Life's not about learning how to get through the storm but learning to dance in the rain." He has another tattoo on his right arm with the Hebrew phrase, "Raz Hazak v'ematz" (translated from Joshua). In English the phrase means strong and courageous. Prosch is described as "devoutly religious" and attended a Baptist church in his youth.
