= Brandon King (linebacker) =

American football player (born 1993)

- King with the New England Patriots in 2015

Profile
- Positions: Linebacker, safety

Personal information
- Born: June 8, 1993 (age 33); Alabaster, Alabama, U.S.
- Listed height: 6 ft 2 in (1.88 m)
- Listed weight: 220 lb (100 kg)

Career information
- High school: Thompson (Alabaster)
- College: Highland; Auburn
- NFL draft: 2015: undrafted

Career history
- New England Patriots (2015–2021); Indianapolis Colts (2022)*
- * Offseason or practice squad member only

Awards and highlights
- 2× Super Bowl champion (LI, LIII)

Career NFL statistics
- Total tackles: 52
- Forced fumbles: 2
- Stats at Pro Football Reference

Brandon King (born June 8, 1993) is an American former professional football player who was a linebacker and safety in the National Football League (NFL). 1,390 of his 1,392 career snaps were on special teams. He was signed by the New England Patriots as an undrafted free agent in 2015 and won Super Bowl LI and Super Bowl LIII with the Patriots. He played college football for the Highland Scotties and Auburn Tigers.

== College career ==
Brandon King played at the linebacker position at Thompson High School in Alabama and for the Highland Scotties of the Kansas Jayhawk Community College Conference. In his sophomore season, King recorded 118 tackles and was ranked as the fifth best safety in the national community college rankings.

In July 2012, King verbally committed to transfer to the University of South Alabama and to play for the Jaguars football team. However, in January 2013, King announced that he had changed his mind, and on National Signing Day a month later, signed to play for the Tigers of Auburn University beginning in the 2013 FBS season.

At Auburn, King played behind Robenson Therezie at the "star" safety position, seeing action in every game of his first season for the Tigers, albeit mostly on special teams. Halfway through his senior season, King was moved to defensive end by his coaches, who were looking for increased speed at the position.

== Professional career ==
=== Pre-draft ===
King was not ranked as a top safety prospect and did not receive an invitation to the NFL Combine. On March 3, 2015, King participated at Auburn's pro day, along with Cameron Artis-Payne, Angelo Blackson, Quan Bray, Sammie Coates, Reese Dismukes, Corey Grant, Nick Marshall, C. J. Uzomah, Jermaine Whitehead, Gabe Wright, Trovon Reed, and nine other teammates. King performed all of the combine and positional drills for scouts and representatives from all 32 NFL teams. He was projected to go undrafted and was ranked as the 72nd best strong safety prospect by NFLDraftScout.com.

Pre-draft measurables
Height	Weight	Arm length	Hand span	40-yard dash	10-yard split	20-yard split	20-yard shuttle	Three-cone drill	Vertical jump	Broad jump	Bench press
6 ft 2 in (1.88 m)	217 lb (98 kg)	31 in (0.79 m)	8 7/8 in (0.23 m)	4.49 s	1.55 s	2.58 s	4.47 s	7.28 s	38 in (0.97 m)	10 ft 6 in (3.20 m)	19 reps
All values from Auburn's Pro Day

=== New England Patriots ===
==== 2015 ====
On May 8, 2015, the New England Patriots signed King as an undrafted free agent after he went unselected in the 2015 NFL draft. The contract King agreed to was for three years and $1.57 million.

With the Patriots depth at both safety positions, King was relegated to competing for a role on special teams. On September 5, 2015, King was released by the Patriots as part of their final roster cuts and was signed to the practice squad the next day. On October 10, 2015, the Patriots signed King to their active roster after releasing cornerback Bradley Fletcher. The following day, he made his professional regular season debut and recorded two solo tackles in a 30–6 victory at the Dallas Cowboys. On November 23, 2015, King collected two solo tackles and forced the first fumble of his career in a 20–13 victory over the Buffalo Bills. During the third quarter, King was assigned to be the gunner on the punt recovery team, opposite Matthew Slater. He forced the Bills' punt returner Leodis McKelvin to fumble and it was recovered by Patriots' linebacker Jonathan Freeny. King finished his rookie season with 12 combined tackles (ten solo) in 13 games and played solely on special teams. His 12 special teams tackles finished second on the team behind only Matthew Slater's 17.

The Patriots finished the season atop the AFC East with a 12–4 record. On January 16, 2016, King played in his first career playoff game and assisted on a tackle during the Patriots' 27–20 victory In the AFC divisional game against the Kansas City Chiefs. The following game, he recorded two solo tackles in the Patriots 20–18 loss to the eventual Super Bowl 50 Champions the Denver Broncos.

==== 2016–2020 ====
On April 7, 2016, King signed his exclusive rights free agent tender to remain with the Patriots. The contract terms were for one year and $525,000 King competed with Cedric Thompson throughout training camp for a job as a backup strong safety. He was named the third string strong safety behind Patrick Chung and Jordan Richards to start the season. On October 16, 2016, King recorded a season-high two combined tackles during a 35–17 victory over the Cincinnati Bengals. He finished the 2016 season with ten combined tackles (7 solo) in 16 games and zero starts. On February 5, 2017, King was part of the Patriots team that won Super Bowl LI. In the game, the Patriots defeated the Atlanta Falcons by a score of 34–28 in overtime. Throughout the playoffs, he appeared in all three games and assisted on one tackle in the AFC divisional round 34–16 victory over the Houston Texans.

On April 12, 2017, King signed his exclusive rights free agent tender to remain with the Patriots. He made the Patriots' 53-man roster after establishing himself as a core special teamer in his previous two years with the team. On October 29, 2017, King forced his first career safety while defending a punt return when he tackled Travis Benjamin in the endzone during the Patriots' 21–13 victory over the Los Angeles Chargers. The Patriots reached Super Bowl LII, but lost 41–33 to the Philadelphia Eagles with King recording 1 tackle.

On March 8, 2018, King signed a two-year contract extension with the Patriots for $2.6 million. King helped the Patriots reach Super Bowl LIII, which they ended up winning against the Los Angeles Rams by a score of 13–3 on February 3, 2019.

On May 17, 2019, King signed a two-year contract extension with the Patriots through the 2021 season. He was placed on injured reserve on August 25, 2019 with a torn quad.

King was placed on the active/physically unable to perform list (PUP) at the start of training camp on August 2, 2020. He was moved to the reserve/PUP list on August 11.

=== Indianapolis Colts ===
On April 13, 2022, the Indianapolis Colts signed King. He was released on August 30, 2022.

== Personal life ==
King invests in cryptocurrency and posts about it on Twitter. He invests in Shiba Inu.
