= 2013 All-SEC football team =

American college football all-star team

The 2013 All-SEC football team consists of American football players selected to the All-Southeastern Conference (SEC) chosen by the Associated Press (AP) and the conference coaches for the 2013 Southeastern Conference football season.

The Auburn Tigers won the conference, beating the Missouri Tigers 59 to 42 in the SEC Championship. Auburn then lost the national championship to the ACC champion FSU Seminoles 34 to 31.

Auburn running back Tre Mason, a unanimous AP selection, was voted the SEC Offensive Player of the Year. Missouri defensive end Michael Sam, also a unanimous AP selection, was voted the AP SEC Defensive Player of the Year.

== Offensive selections ==
=== Quarterbacks ===
- Johnny Manziel, Texas A&M (AP-1, Coaches-1)
- Aaron Murray, Georgia (AP-2)
- A. J. McCarron, Alabama (Coaches-2)

=== Running backs ===
- Tre Mason*, Auburn (AP-1, Coaches-1)
- Jeremy Hill, LSU (AP-1, Coaches-2)
- T. J. Yeldon, Alabama (AP-2, Coaches-2)
- Mike Davis, South Carolina (AP-2, Coaches-2)
- Todd Gurley, Georgia (AP-2)

=== Wide receivers ===
- Jordan Matthews, Vanderbilt (AP-1, Coaches-1)
- Mike Evans, Texas A&M (AP-1, Coaches-1)
- Jarvis Landry, LSU (AP-2, Coaches-2)
- Dorial Green-Beckham, Missouri (AP-2)
- Odell Beckham Jr., LSU (Coaches-2)

=== Centers ===
- Travis Swanson, Arkansas (AP-1, Coaches-2)
- Reese Dismukes, Auburn (AP-2, Coaches-1)

=== Guards ===
- Cyrus Kouandjio, Alabama (AP-1, Coaches-1)
- Gabe Jackson, Miss. St. (AP-1, Coaches-1)
- Anthony Steen, Alabama (AP-1, Coaches-2)
- Trai Turner, LSU (AP-2)

=== Tackles ===
- Jake Matthews, Texas A&M (AP-1, Coaches-1)
- Wesley Johnson, Vanderbilt (AP-1, Coaches-2)
- Justin Britt, Missouri (AP-1, Coaches-2)
- Greg Robinson, Auburn (AP-1)
- Antonio Richardson, Tennessee (AP-2, Coaches-2)
- Ja'Wuan James, Tennessee (AP-2)
- Laremy Tunsil, Ole Miss (AP-2)

=== Tight ends ===
- Arthur Lynch, Georgia (AP-1, Coaches-1)
- Evan Engram, Ole Miss (AP-2)
- Hunter Henry, Arkansas (AP-2)
- C. J. Uzomah, Auburn (AP-2)
- Malcolm Johnson, Miss. St. (Coaches-2)

== Defensive selections ==
=== Defensive ends ===
- Michael Sam*, Missouri (AP-1, Coaches-1)
- Dee Ford, Auburn (AP-1, Coaches-1)
- Jadeveon Clowney, South Carolina (AP-1, Coaches-1)
- Kony Ealy, Missouri (AP-1)
- Bud Dupree, Kentucky (AP-2)
- Dante Fowler, Florida (AP-2)
- Trey Flowers, Arkansas (Coaches-2)
- Chris Smith, Arkansas (Coaches-2)

=== Defensive tackles ===
- Kelcy Quarles, South Carolina (AP-1, Coaches-1)
- Anthony Johnson, LSU (AP-2, Coaches-2)
- Ed Stinson, Alabama (Coaches-2)

=== Linebackers ===
- C. J. Mosley*, Alabama (AP-1, Coaches-1)
- A. J. Johnson, Tennessee (AP-1, Coaches-1)
- Ramik Wilson, Georgia (AP-1, Coaches-1)
- Avery Williamson, Kentucky (AP-2, Coaches-2)
- Lamin Barrow, LSU (AP-2, Coaches-2)
- Trey DePriest, Alabama (AP-2)
- Serderius Bryant, Ole Miss (AP-2)
- Sharrod Golightly, South Carolina (AP-2)
- Denzel Nkemdiche, Ole Miss (AP-2)
- Andrew Wilson, Missouri (AP-2)
- Jordan Jenkins, Georgia (Coaches-2)

=== Cornerbacks ===
- E. J. Gaines, Missouri (AP-1, Coaches-1)
- Vernon Hargreaves III, Florida (AP-1, Coaches-1)
- Andre Hal, Vanderbilt (AP-2, Coaches-2)
- Chris Davis, Auburn (AP-2, Coaches-2)
- Victor Hampton, South Carolina (AP-2)
- Loucheiz Purifoy, Florida (AP-2)

=== Safeties ===
- Cody Prewitt, Ole Miss (AP-1, Coaches-1)
- Kenny Ladler, Vanderbilt (AP-1, Coaches-2)
- Ha Ha Clinton-Dix, Alabama (AP-2, Coaches-1)
- Landon Collins, Alabama (AP-2)
- Nickoe Whitley, Miss. St. (Coaches-2)

== Special teams ==
=== Kickers ===
- Marshall Morgan, Georgia (AP-1, Coaches-1)
- Zach Hocker, Arkansas (AP-2)
- Michael Palardy, Tennessee (Coaches-2)

=== Punters ===
- Cody Mandell, Alabama (AP-1, Coaches-2)
- Drew Kaser, Texas A&M (AP-2, Coaches-1)

=== All purpose/return specialist ===
- Odell Beckham Jr., LSU (AP-1, Coaches-1)
- Christion Jones, Alabama (AP-2, Coaches-1)
- Marcus Murphy, Missouri (Coaches-2)
- Solomon Patton, Florida (Coaches-2)

== Key ==
Bold = Consensus first-team selection by both the coaches and AP

AP = Associated Press

Coaches = Selected by the SEC coaches

* = Unanimous selection of AP

== See also ==
- 2013 Southeastern Conference football season
- 2013 College Football All-America Team
