= C. J. Uzomah =

American football player (born 1993)

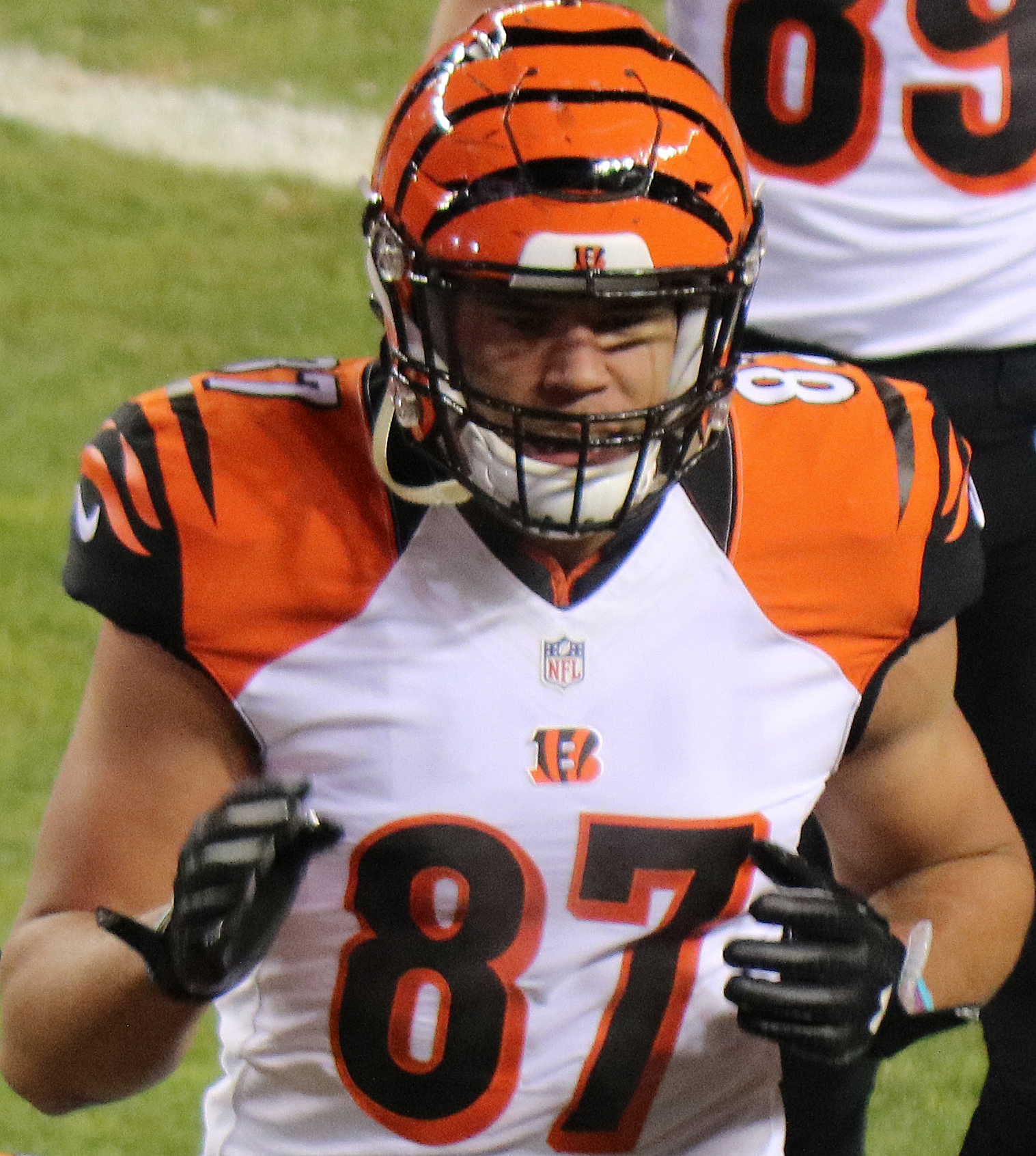
- Uzomah with the Cincinnati Bengals in 2015

No. 87, 47
- Position: Tight end

Personal information
- Born: January 14, 1993 (age 33); Suwanee, Georgia, U.S.
- Listed height: 6 ft 6 in (1.98 m)
- Listed weight: 262 lb (119 kg)

Career information
- High school: North Gwinnett (Suwanee)
- College: Auburn (2011–2014)
- NFL draft: 2015: 5th round, 157th overall pick

Career history
- Cincinnati Bengals (2015–2021); New York Jets (2022–2023); Philadelphia Eagles (2024)

Awards and highlights
- Super Bowl champion (LIX); Second-team All-SEC (2013)

Career NFL statistics
- Receptions: 192
- Receiving yards: 1,881
- Receiving touchdowns: 16
- Stats at Pro Football Reference

Christopher James Uzomah (/juːˈzɒmə/ yoo-ZOM-ə; born January 14, 1993) is an American former professional football tight end. He played college football for the Auburn Tigers and was selected by the Cincinnati Bengals in the fifth round of the 2015 NFL draft. He also played for the New York Jets and Philadelphia Eagles.

== Early life ==
The son of Xavier and Stephanie Uzomah, C. J. attended North Gwinnett High School in Suwanee, Georgia, where he played quarterback. During his senior season, threw for 238 yards with two touchdowns, rushed for 74 yards and had 168 receiving yards with one touchdown. As a junior, he passed for 1,750 yards and 15 touchdowns, and ran for 800 yards and 10 more touchdowns.

== College career ==
Primarily a blocking tight end at Auburn, Uzomah caught only 29 passes in his four seasons, but seven of them were for touchdowns. He majored in Marketing while at Auburn. As a freshman, he threw a 4-yard touchdown pass.

Uzomah attended the 2015 Medal of Honor Bowl along with teammates Angelo Blackson and Jermaine Whitehead, making one reception for 29 yards to help the National team defeat the American team 26–14. On January 17, 2015, it was announced that Uzomah had accepted his invitation to play in the 2014 Senior Bowl. On January 24, 2015, Uzomah caught a pass for nine yards and was a part of a South team that lost 34–13 in the Reese's Senior Bowl. Although he played in the two all-star games, Uzomah was not one of 19 tight ends who received an invitation to perform at the NFL Combine.

== Professional career ==
=== Pre-draft ===
On March 3, 2015, he participated at Auburn's pro day, along with Cameron Artis-Payne, Blackson, Quan Bray, Sammie Coates, Reese Dismukes, Corey Grant, Nick Marshall, Brandon King, Whitehead, Gabe Wright, Trovon Reed, and nine other teammates. Uzomah performed all of the combine and positional drills for scouts and representatives from all 32 NFL teams. He was projected to be a sixth or seventh round draft pick or a possible priority free agent by the majority of NFL draft experts and analysts. NFLDraftScout.com ranked him the 12th best tight end prospect in the draft.

Pre-draft measurables
Height	Weight	Arm length	Hand span	Wingspan	40-yard dash	10-yard split	20-yard split	20-yard shuttle	Three-cone drill	Vertical jump	Broad jump	Bench press
6 ft 5 3/4 in (1.97 m)	262 lb (119 kg)	34 3/4 in (0.88 m)	9 3/4 in (0.25 m)	6 ft 10 1/2 in (2.10 m)	4.62 s	1.58 s	2.65 s	4.57 s	7.22 s	31.0 in (0.79 m)	9 ft 10 in (3.00 m)	19 reps
All values from Auburn's Pro Day

=== Cincinnati Bengals ===
==== 2015 ====
The Cincinnati Bengals selected Uzomah in the fifth round (157th overall) of the 2015 NFL draft. He was the seventh tight end selected in 2015 and the second tight end drafted by the Bengals that year, behind Rutgers' Tyler Kroft (third round, 85th overall). On May 15, 2015, the Bengals signed Uzomah to a four-year, $2.49 million contract with a signing bonus of $212,762.

Throughout training camp, he competed with Tyler Kroft, Jake Murphy, Matt Lengel, and John Peters for the job as the second tight end after Jermaine Gresham departed to the Arizona Cardinals in free agency. Head coach Marvin Lewis named Uzomah the third tight end on the Bengals' depth chart behind Tyler Eifert and Kroft.

On December 6, 2015, Uzomah made his professional regular season debut after being a healthy scratch for the first 11 games. He was promoted to the second tight end after Tyler Eifert had been ruled out of the game after suffering a neck injury. He caught a four-yard pass by Andy Dalton to mark the first reception of his career in the fourth quarter of the Bengals' 37–3 victory over the Cleveland Browns. He completed his rookie season with one reception for four receiving yards in five games and zero starts. The Bengals finished atop the AFC North in 2015 with a 12–4 record. On January 9, 2016, Uzomah appeared in his first playoff game, as the Bengals were defeated by the Pittsburgh Steelers in the AFC Wild Card Round.

==== 2016 ====
Uzomah entered training camp competing to remain a backup tight end against Tyler Kroft, Matt Lengel, and John Peters. He was named the Cincinnati Bengals' starting tight end to begin the regular season after Tyler Eifert was unable to return in time after fracturing his ankle in the 2016 Pro Bowl and Tyler Kroft suffered a sprain knee in training camp.

He started the Bengals' season-opener at the New York Jets and recorded two receptions for a season-high 59 yards in a 23–22 victory. During a Week 5 contest at the Dallas Cowboys, he made a season-high five catches for 43 yards in the Bengals' 28–14 loss. He was inactive for Weeks 11–15 after both Eifert and Kroft had returned from injury. Uzomah started the last two games of the season after Kroft had suffered a knee injury and Eifert had suffered a back injury that would require surgery. On January 1, 2017, Uzomah scored his first career touchdown on a one-yard pass from Andy Dalton during a 27–10 win over the Baltimore Ravens. He completed the 2016 season with 25 receptions for 234 yards and a touchdown in ten games and eight starts.

==== 2017 ====
Uzomah competed with Tyler Kroft and rookies Mason Schreck and Cethan Carter throughout training camp for the job as the backup tight end. Head coach Marvin Lewis named Uzomah the third tight end on the Bengals' depth chart to start the regular season.

After being inactive for the first two games, Uzomah was activated for Week 3 after Tyler Eifert was unable to play due to a back injury. Eifert was placed on injured/reserve for the remainder of the season. On October 1, 2017, Uzomah made his first catch of the season for an 11-yard gain during a 31–7 victory at the Browns. The next game, he earned his first start of the season and had one reception for 21 yards in a 20–16 win against the Buffalo Bills. He totaled 10 receptions for 92 yards and a touchdown on the season.

==== 2018–2021 ====
In 2018, Uzomah played in 16 games with 15 starts, recording a career-high 43 receptions for 439 yards and three touchdowns.

On March 11, 2019, Uzomah signed a three-year, $18 million contract extension with the Bengals. He started in all 16 games and recorded 27 receptions for 242 receiving yards and two touchdowns.

In the Bengals second game of the 2020 season, Uzomah caught four passes for 42 yards and rookie quarterback Joe Burrow's first career passing touchdown against the Cleveland Browns. During the game, Uzomah also tore his Achilles tendon, which caused him to miss the rest of the season. The following day, he was placed on injured reserve.

Uzomah returned to start 16 games for the Bengals in 2021, setting new career highs for receptions (49), receiving yards (493), and touchdowns (5). He went on to catch six passes for 64 yards and a touchdown in the Wild Card Round win over the Las Vegas Raiders. Uzomah had two receptions for 11 yards in the loss to the Los Angeles Rams in Super Bowl LVI.

=== New York Jets ===
On March 17, 2022, Uzomah signed a three-year, $24 million contract with the New York Jets. He appeared in 15 games in the 2022 season. He finished with 21 receptions for 232 receiving yards and two receiving touchdowns, which both came in Week 15 against the Detroit Lions.

On December 6, 2023, Uzomah was placed on injured reserve after suffering an MCL injury in Week 13.

On March 5, 2024, Uzomah was released by the Jets.

=== Philadelphia Eagles ===
On April 11, 2024, Uzomah signed a one-year deal with the Philadelphia Eagles. Uzomah was released by the Eagles on August 21, before the regular season began. He re-signed with the practice squad on October 10. Uzomah was promoted to the active roster on December 4. He was placed on injured reserve on January 30, 2025. He won a Super Bowl championship when the Eagles defeated the Kansas City Chiefs 40–22 in Super Bowl LIX.

On August 24, 2026, Uzomah retired from professional football.

== NFL career statistics ==
Legend
Won the Super Bowl

=== Regular season ===
Year	Team	Games		Receiving					Fumbles	
Year	Team	GP	GS	Rec	Yds	Avg	Lng	TD	Fum	Lost
2015	CIN	5	0	1	4	4.0	4	0	0	0
2016	CIN	10	8	25	234	9.4	54	1	0	0
2017	CIN	14	4	10	92	9.2	21	1	0	0
2018	CIN	16	15	43	439	10.2	29	3	0	0
2019	CIN	16	16	27	242	9.0	36	2	0	0
2020	CIN	2	2	8	87	10.9	23	1	0	0
2021	CIN	16	16	49	493	10.1	55	5	0	0
2022	NYJ	15	13	21	232	11.0	40	2	0	0
2023	NYJ	12	8	8	58	7.3	19	1	0	0
2024	PHI	7	3	0	0	-	-	0	0	0
Career		94	74	184	1,823	9.9	55	15	0	0

=== Postseason ===
Year	Team	Games		Receiving					Fumbles	
Year	Team	GP	GS	Rec	Yds	Avg	Lng	TD	Fum	Lost
2015	CIN	1	0	0	0	0.0	0	0	0	0
2021	CIN	4	4	15	146	9.7	32	1	0	0
Career		5	4	15	146	9.7	32	1	0	0

== Personal life ==
C.J.'s father, Xavier, earned an MBA from Auburn. Uzomah's mother, Stephanie, holds a doctorate in education. Uzomah is of Nigerian descent.
