= Jonathon Mincy =

American gridiron football player (born 1992)

No. 2
- Position: Cornerback

Personal information
- Born: September 5, 1992 (age 34); Decatur, Georgia, U.S.
- Listed height: 5 ft 10 in (1.78 m)
- Listed weight: 196 lb (89 kg)

Career information
- High school: Southwest DeKalb (Decatur, Georgia)
- College: Auburn
- NFL draft: 2015: undrafted

Career history
- Atlanta Falcons (2015)*; Montreal Alouettes (2016–2017); Chicago Bears (2018–2019)*; Toronto Argonauts (2019); Edmonton Eskimos / Elks (2020–2021)
- * Offseason or practice squad member only

Awards and highlights
- CFL East All-Star (2017)
- Stats at Pro Football Reference

Jonathon Tyrone Mincy (born September 5, 1992) is an American former professional football cornerback. He was signed by the Atlanta Falcons as an undrafted free agent after the 2015 NFL draft. He played college football at Auburn. He was also a member of the Montreal Alouettes, Chicago Bears, Toronto Argonauts, and Edmonton Eskimos / Elks.

== Professional career ==
=== Atlanta Falcons ===
On May 5, 2015, Mincy was signed by the Atlanta Falcons as an undrafted free agent after the 2015 NFL Draft. On August 31, he was waived.

=== Montreal Alouettes ===
On June 20, 2016, Mincy was signed to the Montreal Alouettes' practice roster. He made the active roster and finished his rookie season in the CFL with 54 tackles, an interception, and two forced fumbles. The next season, he recorded 54 tackles and two interceptions. On November 8, 2017, Mincy was named as an Eastern Division All-Star. On December 4, 2017, Mincy was released so he could pursue an opportunity in the NFL.

=== Chicago Bears ===
On January 10, 2018, Mincy was signed by the Chicago Bears to a reserve/future contract. He was waived on September 1, 2018, and was signed to the practice squad the next day. He signed a reserve/future contract with the Bears on January 8, 2019. On August 31, 2019, Mincy was waived by the Bears.

=== Toronto Argonauts ===
On September 18, 2019, Mincy was signed to the Toronto Argonauts' practice roster.

=== Edmonton Eskimos / Elks ===
Mincy signed with the Edmonton Elks on a contract extension through 2022 on December 26, 2020. He was released on January 27, 2022.
