= Tre Mason =

American gridiron football player (born 1993)

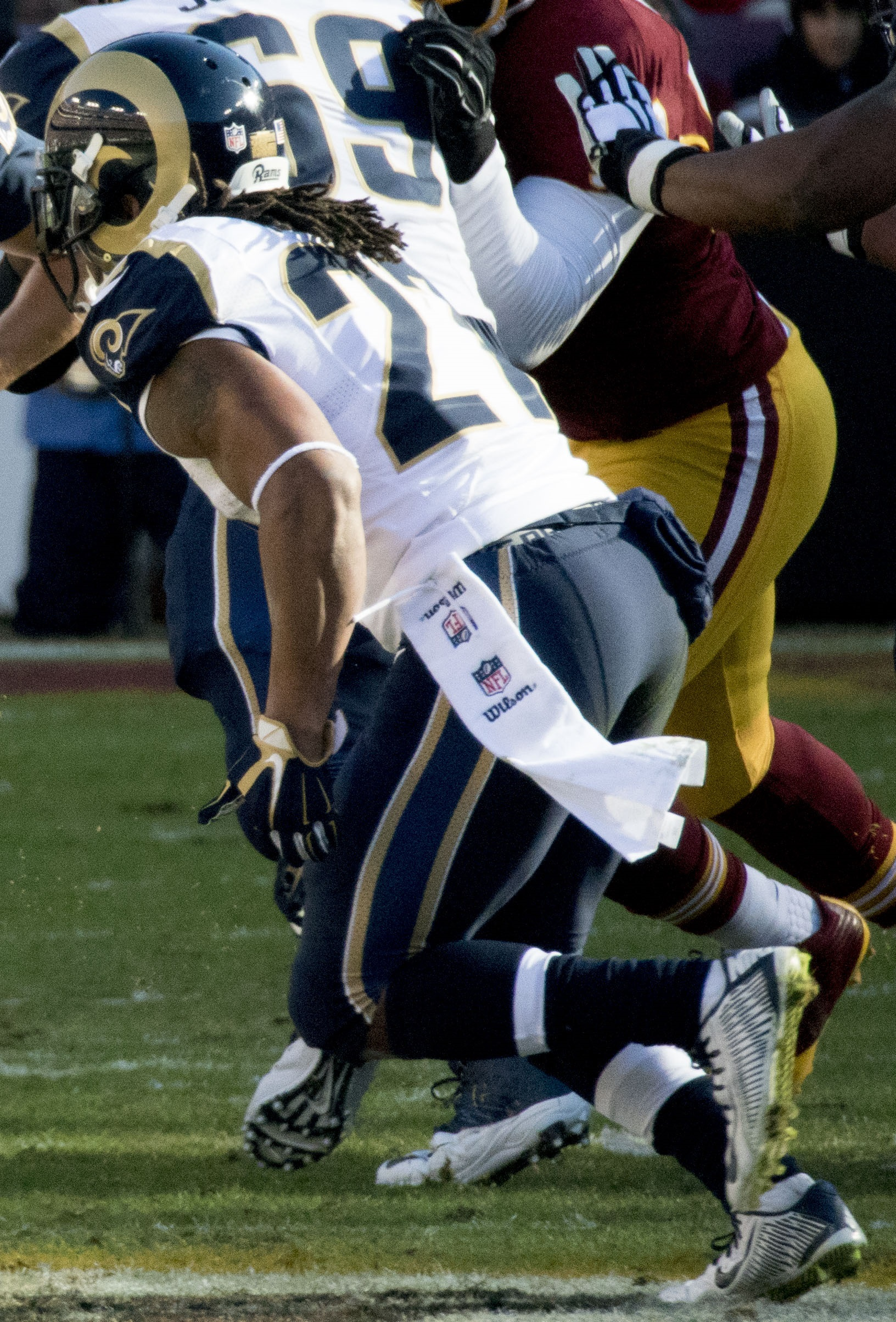
- Mason with the St. Louis Rams in 2014

No. 27
- Position: Running back

Personal information
- Born: August 6, 1993 (age 33); Amityville, New York, U.S.
- Listed height: 5 ft 8 in (1.73 m)
- Listed weight: 207 lb (94 kg)

Career information
- High school: Park Vista (Lake Worth Beach, Florida)
- College: Auburn (2011–2013)
- NFL draft: 2014: 3rd round, 75th overall pick

Career history
- St. Louis / Los Angeles Rams (2014–2015); Saskatchewan Roughriders (2018)

Awards and highlights
- PFWA All-Rookie Team (2014); First-team All-American (2013); SEC Offensive Player of the Year (2013); First-team All-SEC (2013)

Career NFL statistics
- Rushing attempts: 254
- Rushing yards: 972
- Rushing touchdowns: 5
- Receptions: 34
- Receiving yards: 236
- Receiving touchdowns: 1
- Stats at Pro Football Reference
- Stats at CFL.ca

Trence Mason (born August 6, 1993) is an American former professional football player who was a running back for the St. Louis Rams of the National Football League (NFL) from 2014 to 2016. He played college football for the Auburn Tigers, earning first-team All-American honors in 2013. He was selected by the Rams in the third round of the 2014 NFL draft.

== Early life ==
Mason attended Park Vista Community High School in Boynton Beach, Florida, where he was a standout football and basketball player, and also ran track. He rushed for 1,643 yards and 24 touchdowns as a senior in 2011, and was named the 2009 Palm Beach Large School Offensive Player of the Year and First-Team All-Palm Beach County by the Sun-Sentinel.

He was also on the school's track & field team, where he competed as a sprinter and jumper. He placed 7th in the 100 meters at the 2009 Park Vista Meet, with a time of 10.9 seconds. At the 2010 Palm Beach County Championship, he earned a sixth-place finish in the long jump event, recording a career-best jump of 6.63 meters. He also competed in high jump, he got a top-jump of 1.88 meters at the 2011 Warrior Invitational.

Considered a four-star recruit by Rivals.com, he was rated the 14th best running back in his class. He committed to Auburn over offers from West Virginia and Mississippi.

== College career ==
In his first college game, Auburn against Utah State, Mason returned a kick-off 97 yards for a touchdown.

In the 2013 SEC Championship Game against Missouri, Mason set an SEC Championship rushing record with 304 yards (breaking LSU's Justin Vincent's previous 2003 record of 201 yards), touchdown record with four touchdowns, rushing attempts record with 46 carries and was named the game's most valuable player.

As a junior in 2013, Mason was a first-team All-Southeastern Conference (SEC) selection. He was named one of the six finalists for the 2013 Heisman Trophy.

In the 2014 BCS National Championship Game, Mason rushed for 195 yards on 34 carries and a touchdown in a 34–31 defeat by the Florida State Seminoles. He finished his season with 1,816 rushing yards, breaking the school record held by Heisman winner Bo Jackson (1,786 set in 1985). It was also the third-highest rushing yards total in a single season in SEC history, behind only Herschel Walker (1,891 yards in 1981) and Darren McFadden (1,830 yards in 2007). Later single-season yardage marks set by Alabama's Derrick Henry (2,219 yards), and LSU's Leonard Fournette (1,953 yards) placed Mason's 2013 performance at fifth-highest all-time.

== Professional career ==
=== Pre-draft ===
Mason announced on January 9, 2014, that he would forgo his remaining eligibility and enter the NFL draft.

Pre-draft measurables
Height	Weight	Arm length	Hand span	40-yard dash	10-yard split	20-yard shuttle	Vertical jump	Broad jump
5 ft 8 1/2 in (1.74 m)	207 lb (94 kg)	30 in (0.76 m)	9 in (0.23 m)	4.44 s	1.50 s	4.15 s	38.5 in (0.98 m)	10 ft 6 in (3.20 m)
All values from NFL Combine

=== St. Louis/Los Angeles Rams ===
Mason was selected by the St. Louis Rams in the third round (75th overall) of the 2014 NFL draft. Mason was the Rams' third pick in the draft, behind former teammate and second overall pick, Greg Robinson.

In Week 7, 2014 in a game against the Seattle Seahawks, Mason ran for 85 yards on 18 carries with 1 touchdown in a St. Louis win. In Week 11, he had 113 yards on 29 carries in a game against the Denver Broncos. During a Week 13 matchup against the Oakland Raiders, Mason ran for 117 yards on 14 carries and 2 touchdowns, to go along with one receiving touchdown. After rushing for 765 yards and 4 touchdowns in 2014, Mason was named to the PFWA All-Rookie Team.

Following the 2015 season and going into the 2016 season, it was reported that Mason had not been in contact with coaches or players from the Rams since the end of the season. Coach Jeff Fisher stated "I tried numerous times to reach him, he has made a decision not to communicate with us, not to talk. Not talking to his teammates. Right now we're more concerned about his well-being than we are his football career." Mason had several run-ins with the law and displayed erratic behavior throughout the summer. On July 30, the Rams placed Mason on the reserve/did not report list.

On March 10, 2017, Mason was released by the Rams. Former college teammate Ricardo Louis stated in April 2017 that Mason was working towards coming back to the NFL for the upcoming season.

=== Saskatchewan Roughriders ===
On May 30, 2018, Mason signed with the Saskatchewan Roughriders of the Canadian Football League. Mason's usage increased following the suspension and release of Jerome Messam on voyeurism charges. With increased playing time, Mason proved to be a key contributor to a lackluster Roughriders offense, including producing a 20-carry, 117-yard effort during the 2018 Banjo Bowl, a Riders win. Despite playing in all 18 games, Mason was held without a score until near the end of the year, when he had three rushing touchdowns in the final six games of the regular season. Mason finished the year with a higher rushing average than a receiving average. He missed the Roughrider's lone playoff game due to injury. During the off-season Roughriders signed William Powell in free agency, at which time Mason's injury was revealed to be a damaged ACL requiring surgery, which could keep Mason from playing in 2019. He was released by the Riders on May 10, 2019.

== Career statistics ==
Legend
**Bold**	Career high

=== NFL ===
Regular season

Season	Team	Games		Rushing					Receiving					Fumbles	
Season	Team	GP	GS	Att	Yds	Avg	Lng	TD	Rec	Yds	Avg	Lng	TD	FUM	Lost
2014	St. Louis Rams	12	9	**179**	**765**	**4.3**	**89**	**4**	16	**148**	**9.3**	**35**	**1**	2	**1**
2015	St. Louis Rams	13	3	75	207	2.8	15	1	**18**	88	4.9	16	0	**3**	**1**
	Total	25	12	254	972	3.8	89	5	34	236	6.9	35	1	5	2

=== CFL ===
Regular season

Season	Team	Games	Rushing					Receiving				
Season	Team	GP	Att	Yds	Avg	Lng	TD	Rec	Yds	Avg	Lng	TD
2018	Saskatchewan Roughriders	18	160	809	5.1	42	3	21	103	4.9	16	0
	Total	18	160	809	5.1	42	3	21	103	4.9	16	0

=== College ===
Year	Team	Games		Rushing				Receiving			
Year	Team	GP	GS	Att	Yards	Avg	TD	Rec	Yards	Avg	TD
2011	Auburn	12	1	28	161	5.8	0	0	0	0.0	0
2012	Auburn	12	12	171	1,002	**5.9**	8	7	86	12.3	0
2013	Auburn	14	14	**317**	**1,816**	5.7	**23**	**12**	**163**	**13.6**	**1**
Career		38	27	516	2,979	5.8	32	19	249	13.6	1

== Personal life ==
His father, Vincent Mason, is a member of hip hop group De La Soul.

After Mason led police on a high-speed ATV chase, Mason's mother stated that Mason had the "mindset of a 10-year-old" due to head injuries sustained during his career. She noticed her son’s behavior was different after the 2015 season: “Clearly, we could see the change. Like, completely... As much as he’s accomplished, as hard as he’s worked, as much as he’s built his character, in record-breaking time it’s going downhill because of what’s going on." In November, Mason pleaded no contest to charges related to the ATV chase. Mason was arrested in January 2017 for the incident and charged with a third degree felony of fleeing and eluding without regard for others' safety or property.

Mason was also arrested in Palm Beach County, Florida, on July 18, 2026. He was booked on charges of aggravated battery on a pregnant victim, and domestic intent to do violence. He was then ordered to have no contact with the victim by a judge on July 19th, 2026. The victim, his then-girlfriend, called Mason after she woke up around 1:00am, after realizing he wasn’t home. He promised her earlier that he would be around 11:00pm. Mason told her that he was at Elmo’s Rock Bar & Grill. She drove up to the restaurant to see him socializing with multiple other people. She took his key-ring to remove her house key and returned them back to him. The victim went to leave, but Mason blocked her from entering her vehicle. She tried to get in and leave without striking him, at which point Mason pushed her backwards into the driver’s seat, demanding she put the vehicle in park. She then alleged Mason threatened her by saying “I’m gonna go to jail tonight because you keep trying me.” This is when 911 was called by the victim and officers arrived on scene, placing Mason under arrest.
