= Robenson Therezie =

American football player (born 1991)

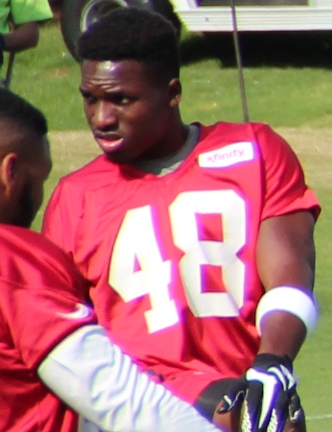
- Therezie with the Atlanta Falcons in 2015

No. 48, 27, 37
- Position: Cornerback

Personal information
- Born: August 5, 1991 (age 35); Miami, Florida, U.S.
- Listed height: 5 ft 9 in (1.75 m)
- Listed weight: 212 lb (96 kg)

Career information
- High school: Miami Jackson
- College: Auburn
- NFL draft: 2015: undrafted

Career history
- Atlanta Falcons (2015–2016); New Orleans Saints (2016); New York Jets (2017)*; Cincinnati Bengals (2017–2018)*; Indianapolis Colts (2018); Birmingham Iron (2019)*; Tampa Bay Vipers (2020)*; Team 9 (2020)*; Tampa Bay Vipers (2020)
- * Offseason or practice squad member only

Career NFL statistics
- Total tackles: 36
- Pass deflections: 2
- Interceptions: 1
- Stats at Pro Football Reference

Robenson Therezie (born August 5, 1991) is an American former professional football player who was a cornerback in the National Football League (NFL). He was signed by the Atlanta Falcons as an undrafted free agent after the 2015 NFL draft. He played college football for the Auburn Tigers.

== Professional career ==
=== Atlanta Falcons ===
Following the 2015 NFL draft, Therezie was signed by the Atlanta Falcons as an undrafted free agent. He made the team's 53-man roster on September 7, 2015. In Week 7 of the 2015 season, Therezie recorded his first career interception off Titans quarterback Zach Mettenberger in the final two minutes of the Falcons 10–7 victory.

On December 22, 2016, Therezie was released by the Falcons.

=== New Orleans Saints ===
Therezie was claimed off waivers by the New Orleans Saints on December 23, 2016. On August 12, 2017, Therezie was waived by the Saints.

=== New York Jets ===
On August 13, 2017, Therezie was signed by the New York Jets. He was waived on September 2, 2017.

=== Cincinnati Bengals ===
On December 13, 2017, Therezie was signed to the Cincinnati Bengals' practice squad. He signed a reserve/future contract with the Bengals on January 1, 2018. He was waived on May 14, 2018.

=== Indianapolis Colts ===
On August 18, 2018, Therezie was signed by the Indianapolis Colts. He was waived/injured on September 1, 2018, and was placed on injured reserve. He was released on September 28, 2018.

=== Tampa Bay Vipers ===
Therezie was selected in the 9th round during phase four in the 2020 XFL draft by the Tampa Bay Vipers. He was waived during final roster cuts on January 22, 2020.

Therezie was signed to the XFL's practice squad team, referred to as Team 9, on January 30, 2020.

Therezie re-signed with the Vipers on February 25, 2020. He had his contract terminated when the league suspended operations on April 10, 2020.

Therezie signed with the Conquerors of The Spring League in May 2021.
