= Cameron Artis-Payne =

American gridiron football player (born 1990)

No. 34
- Position: Running back

Personal information
- Born: June 23, 1990 (age 36); Harrisburg, Pennsylvania, U.S.
- Listed height: 5 ft 10 in (1.78 m)
- Listed weight: 210 lb (95 kg)

Career information
- High school: Harrisburg
- College: Allan Hancock College (2011–2012); Auburn (2013–2014)
- NFL draft: 2015: 5th round, 174th overall pick

Career history
- Carolina Panthers (2015–2018); Dallas Renegades (2020); Montreal Alouettes (2021–2023)

Awards and highlights
- First-team All-SEC (2014)

Career NFL statistics
- Rushing yards: 491
- Rushing average: 4.2
- Rushing touchdowns: 5
- Receptions: 10
- Receiving yards: 86
- Stats at Pro Football Reference

Cameron Artis-Payne (born June 23, 1990) is an American former professional football player who was a running back in the National Football League (NFL). He played college football for the Auburn Tigers, and was selected by the Carolina Panthers in the fifth round of the 2015 NFL draft.

== Early life ==
Artis-Payne attended Harrisburg High School in Harrisburg, Pennsylvania. He spent one year at Milford Academy in New Berlin, New York after graduating from high school.

== College career ==
Artis-Payne attended Allan Hancock College in 2011 and 2012. In two seasons, he rushed for 3,412 yards and 43 touchdowns, earning California Community College Athletic Association (CCCAA) All-American and California juco player of the year. Artis-Payne transferred to Auburn University before the 2013 season. In his first year at Auburn, he rushed for 610 yards with six touchdowns as a backup to Tre Mason. Artis-Payne started his senior season in 2014 as Auburn's starter. In 13 games, he rushed for a conference-leading 1,608 yards on 303 carries with 13 rushing touchdowns, earning first-team All-Southeastern Conference (SEC) honors.

== Professional career ==
External videos
- Artis-Payne's NFL Combine workout
- Artis-Payne gets drafted by Carolina

Pre-draft measurables
Height	Weight	Arm length	Hand span	40-yard dash	10-yard split	20-yard split	20-yard shuttle	Three-cone drill	Vertical jump	Broad jump
5 ft 9 3/4 in (1.77 m)	212 lb (96 kg)	29 5/8 in (0.75 m)	8 7/8 in (0.23 m)	4.53 s	1.61 s	2.67 s	4.25 s	7.13 s	36.5 in (0.93 m)	9 ft 10 in (3.00 m)
All values are from NFL Combine, except short shuttle from Pro Day

=== Carolina Panthers ===
Artis-Payne was selected in the fifth round (174th overall) by the Carolina Panthers in the 2015 NFL draft. In the 2015 season, he finished with 45 carries for 183 rushing yards and a touchdown.

On February 7, 2016, Artis-Payne's Panthers played in Super Bowl 50. In the game, the Panthers fell to the Denver Broncos by a score of 24–10. Artis-Payne was inactive for the game.

In the 2016 season, Artis–Payne finished with 144 rushing yards and two rushing touchdowns, which both came against the Tampa Bay Buccaneers on October 10. In the 2017 season, he finished with 95 rushing yards and a rushing touchdown. In the 2018 season, he had 19 carries for 69 yards and one rushing touchdown.

On March 28, 2019, Artis-Payne re-signed with the Panthers on a one-year contract. He was released by Carolina during final roster cuts on August 30.

=== Dallas Renegades ===
Artis-Payne was selected by the Dallas Renegades of the XFL in the third round in the 2020 XFL draft. During the five games played during the COVID-19 pandemic shortened 2020 season, Artis-Payne worked his way up from backup to starter, recording 241 rushing yards on 41 carries for over five yards per carry average, and two touchdowns, as well as 23 catches for 101 yards. Pro Football Focus named him one of their highest rated players by the time the season was over. He had his contract terminated when the league suspended operations on April 10, 2020.

=== Montreal Alouettes ===
On February 23, 2021, Artis-Payne signed with the Montreal Alouettes of the Canadian Football League. Filling in for starting running back William Stanback, Artis-Payne rushed for 122 yards on 21 carries and scored a late touchdown against the Ottawa Redblacks in Week 10 to secure the victory.

== Career statistics ==
=== NFL ===
Regular season statistics
Year	Team	GP	GS	Rushing					Receiving					Fumbles	
Year	Team	GP	GS	Att	Yds	Avg	Lng	TD	Rec	Yds	Avg	Lng	TD	Fum	Lost
2015	CAR	7	0	45	183	4.1	31	1	5	58	11.6	20	0	0	0
2016	CAR	3	3	36	144	4.0	14	2	1	11	11.0	11	0	0	0
2017	CAR	13	0	18	95	5.3	43	1	1	2	2.0	2	0	0	0
2018	CAR	9	0	19	69	3.6	43	1	3	15	5.0	2	0	0	0
Total		32	3	118	491	4.2	43	5	10	86	8.6	20	0	0	0

Postseason statistics
Year	Team	GP	GS	Rushing					Receiving					Fumbles	
Year	Team	GP	GS	Att	Yds	Avg	Lng	TD	Rec	Yds	Avg	Lng	TD	Fum	Lost
2015	CAR	1	0	3	7	2.3	3	0	1	1	1.0	1	0	1	0
2017	CAR	1	0	0	0	0.0	0	0	0	0	0.0	0	0	0	0
Total		2	0	3	7	2.3	3	0	1	1	1.0	1	0	1	0

=== College ===
Year	Rushing					Receiving		
Year	Att	Yds	Avg	Lng	TD	Rec	Yds	TD
2013	91	610	6.7	59	6	1	4	0
2014	303	1,608	5.3	37	13	13	147	0
Career	394	2,218	5.6	59	19	14	151	0
