= Greg Robinson (offensive tackle) =

American football player (born 1992)

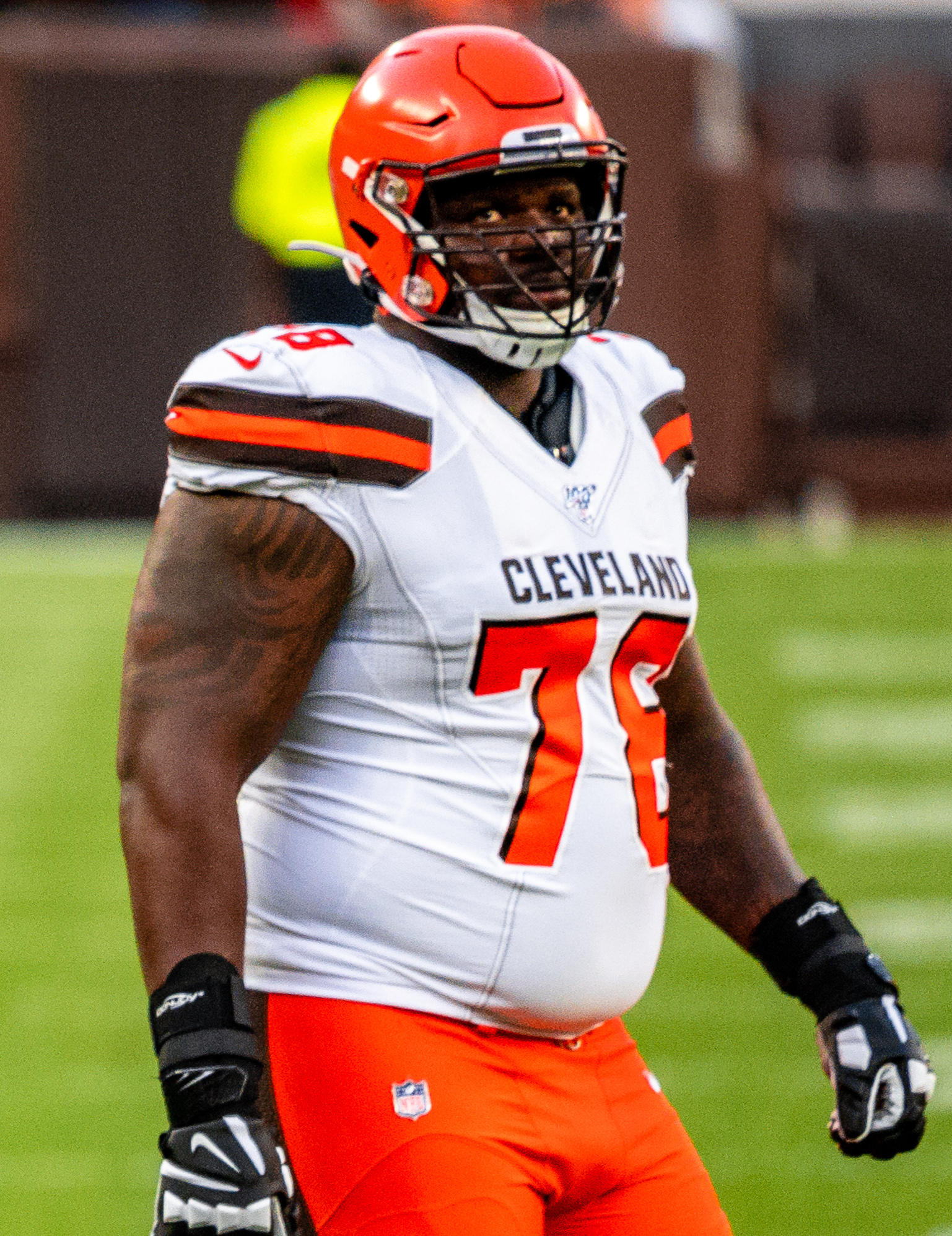
- Robinson with the Cleveland Browns in 2019

No. 79, 73, 78
- Position: Offensive tackle

Personal information
- Born: October 21, 1992 (age 34); Raceland, Louisiana, U.S.
- Listed height: 6 ft 5 in (1.96 m)
- Listed weight: 330 lb (150 kg)

Career information
- High school: Thibodaux (Thibodaux, Louisiana)
- College: Auburn (2011–2013)
- NFL draft: 2014: 1st round, 2nd overall pick

Career history
- St. Louis / Los Angeles Rams (2014–2016); Detroit Lions (2017); Cleveland Browns (2018–2019)

Awards and highlights
- First-team All-SEC (2013)

Career NFL statistics
- Games played: 83
- Games started: 70
- Stats at Pro Football Reference

Gregory Keith Robinson (born October 21, 1992) is an American former professional football player who was an offensive tackle in the National Football League (NFL). After playing college football for the Auburn Tigers, he was selected by the St. Louis Rams second overall in the 2014 NFL draft. He also played for the Detroit Lions and the Cleveland Browns.

== Early life ==
Robinson attended Thibodaux High School in Thibodaux, Louisiana, where he was a two-time all-state lineman for the Tigers football team. He did not play on the offensive line until junior year of high school after playing defensive line as a freshman. After his senior season, Robinson participated in the U.S. Army All-American Bowl.

As a standout athlete, Robinson was one of the state's top performers in the shot put competition. In the discus, he got a top-throw of 43.48 meters at the 2010 Thibodaux Tiger Relays, placing second. He won the shot put event at the 2011 High School Last Chance Qualifier, recording a career-best throw of 18.26 meters.

Regarded as a four-star recruit by Rivals.com, Robinson was ranked as the second best guard prospect in the nation, behind Aundrey Walker.

== College career ==
At Auburn, Robinson was redshirted in 2011. He took over as the starting left tackle in 2012 and started 11 games. As a sophomore in 2013, he was a first-team All-Southeastern Conference (SEC) selection.

== Professional career ==
Pre-draft measurables
Height	Weight	Arm length	Hand span	40-yard dash	10-yard split	20-yard split	20-yard shuttle	Three-cone drill	Vertical jump	Broad jump	Bench press
6 ft 5 in (1.96 m)	332 lb (151 kg)	35 in (0.89 m)	10 in (0.25 m)	4.92 s	1.72 s	2.88 s	4.86 s	7.80 s	28 1/2 in (0.72 m)	9 ft 5 in (2.87 m)	32 reps
All values from NFL Combine

=== St. Louis/Los Angeles Rams ===
Robinson was drafted by the St. Louis Rams in the first round with the second overall pick in the 2014 NFL draft. Robinson was the highest Auburn Tigers offensive lineman ever selected, beating out Ken Rice, the eighth overall pick in the 1961 NFL draft.

On June 16, 2014, the Rams signed Robinson to a fully guaranteed, four-year, $21.28 million rookie contract that also included a $13.79 million signing bonus and no offset language.

In the 2016 season, Robinson arrived at training camp 14 to 15 pounds overweight. He began the regular season as the starting left tackle, but was inefficient throughout the first ten games of the season and was also penalized 12 times in the first ten games. On November 27, 2016, Robinson was a healthy scratch for the Rams' Week 11 match-up against the New Orleans Saints and was replaced by starting left guard Rodger Saffold.

On March 9, 2017, after signing tackle Andrew Whitworth, the Rams moved Robinson to guard. On April 11, 2017, Robinson was moved to right tackle and Rob Havenstein was moved from right tackle to guard. On May 2, 2017, the Rams declined the fifth-year option on Robinson's contract, making him a free agent after the 2017 season.

=== Detroit Lions ===
On June 15, 2017, Robinson was traded to the Detroit Lions for a 2018 sixth-round draft pick. The trade was made after Lions starting left tackle Taylor Decker underwent shoulder surgery that made him miss 4–6 months. He was waived by the Lions on November 10, 2017, citing an injury. Prior to the waiver, Robinson missed two games due to an ankle injury. He was placed on injured reserve after clearing waivers.

=== Cleveland Browns ===
Robinson was signed by the Cleveland Browns on June 19, 2018. He was named a backup tackle to begin the season, behind rookie left tackle Desmond Harrison and right tackle Chris Hubbard. He was named the starting left tackle in Week 9, and started there the rest of the season, taking over from the undrafted rookie Harrison. The Browns finished with a 7–8–1 record.

Robinson was re-signed by the Browns to a one-year contract on February 25, 2019. In 2019, he remained the starting left tackle for the Browns, starting 15 games, missing the Browns Week 13 game against the Pittsburgh Steelers with a concussion. In Week 1 of the 2019 season against the Tennessee Titans, Robinson was ejected from the game after he kicked Titans' safety Kenny Vaccaro in the head. He was fined $10,527 for the incident. He recorded a recovered fumble in the Browns Week 5 loss to the San Francisco 49ers and was part of the offensive line that blocked for Nick Chubb as he finished second in the league in rushing yards. The Browns finished with a 6–10 record.

Robinson became an unrestricted free agent following the 2019 season.

== Legal troubles ==
On February 18, 2020, Robinson was jailed in El Paso County, Texas for possession of 156.9 pounds of marijuana. Robinson – who was also with 26-year-old ex-NFL player Quan Bray – was stopped around 7:15 PM on Monday evening after a Border Patrol drug-sniffing dog alerted to the rear cargo door of their 2020 Chevrolet Tahoe. According to the docs, Robinson and Bray were not reentering the country from Mexico – rather they were trying to get from Los Angeles to Louisiana and hit the checkpoint on the way. There was a third person in the SUV, an Uber driver who was not charged. During the stop, Robinson and Bray allegedly tried to get that person to take the fall for the weed. Robinson and Bray faced up to 20 years in prison, if convicted. He was ultimately sentenced to 5 years probation. On February 9, 2022, Robinson was arrested again with possession of $120,000 worth of illegal drugs in Louisiana. On March 20, 2026, Robinson was federally charged in connection with a contraband smuggling ring operating within the federal tier of the Lafourche Parish Correctional Complex, where he was incarcerated.
