= Quan Bray =

American football player (born 1993)

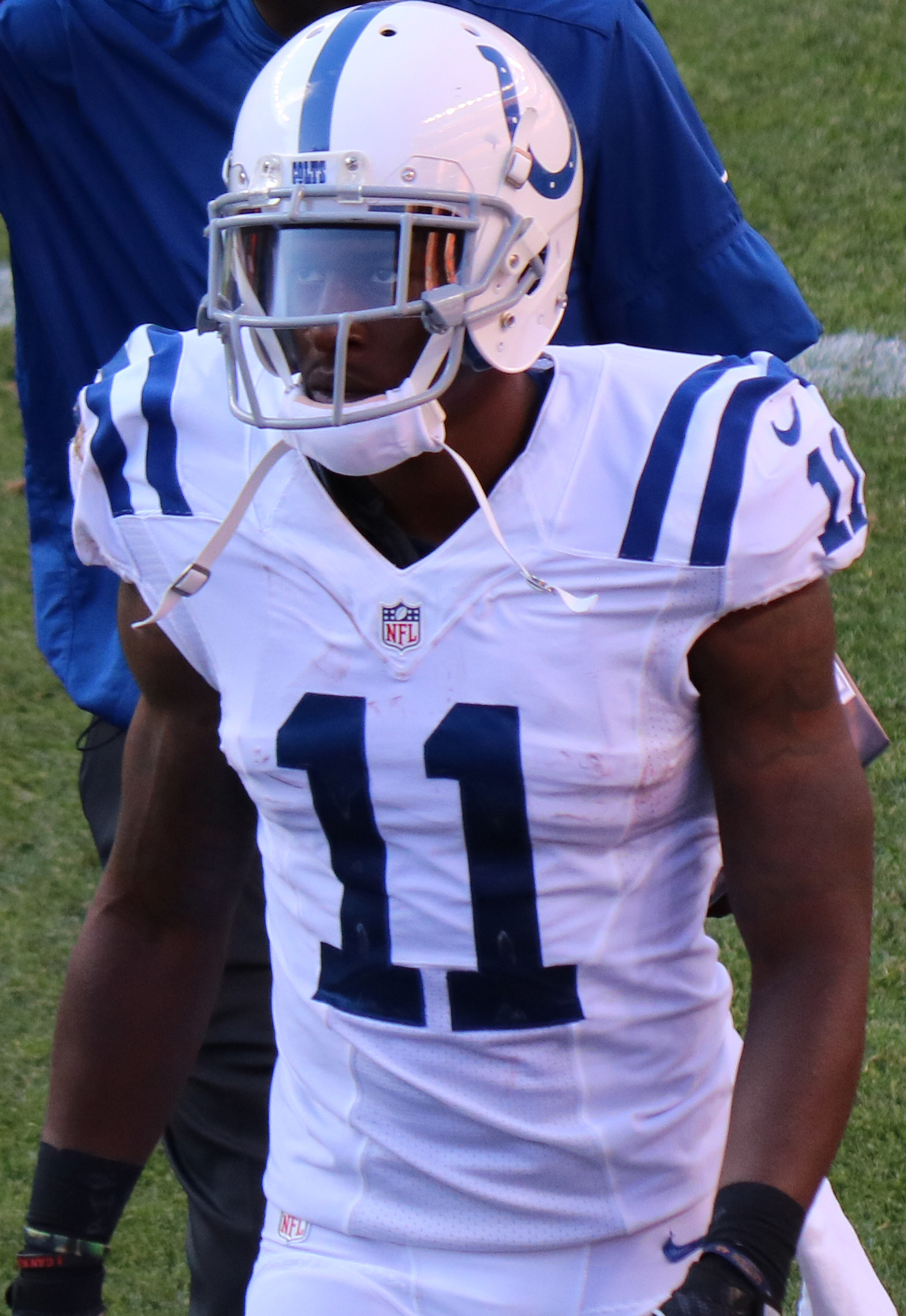
- Bray with the Indianapolis Colts in 2016

No. 11, 15, 4, 3
- Position: Wide receiver

Personal information
- Born: April 28, 1993 (age 33); LaGrange, Georgia, U.S.
- Listed height: 5 ft 10 in (1.78 m)
- Listed weight: 184 lb (83 kg)

Career information
- High school: Troup County (LaGrange)
- College: Auburn (2011-2014)
- NFL draft: 2015: undrafted

Career history
- Indianapolis Colts (2015–2017); Buffalo Bills (2017–2018)*; Houston Texans (2018)*; Birmingham Iron (2019); Montreal Alouettes (2019–2022); Ottawa Redblacks (2022–2023)
- * Offseason or practice squad member only

Awards and highlights
- Second-team All-SEC (2014)

Career NFL statistics
- Receptions: 6
- Receiving yards: 75
- Return yards: 1,545
- Stats at Pro Football Reference
- Stats at CFL.ca

Jaquan Tyreke Bray (born April 28, 1993) is an American former professional football player who was a wide receiver in the National Football League (NFL) and Canadian Football League (CFL). He played college football for the Auburn Tigers, and signed with the NFL's Indianapolis Colts (NFL) as an undrafted free agent in 2015. He was also a member of the Buffalo Bills and Houston Texans of the NFL, the Birmingham Iron of the Alliance of American Football (AAF), and the Montreal Alouettes and Ottawa Redblacks of the CFL.

== Early life ==
Jaquan Tyreke Bray was ranked as the nation's number 5 athlete by ESPN.com and the 40th overall recruit. He was projected by scouts as a running back, wide receiver, cornerback and safety, and committed to Auburn over Alabama on February 2, 2011. Following his senior year, Bray was selected to the 2011 Under Armour All-America Game.

== College career ==
At Auburn, Bray was a second team coaches all-Southeastern Conference (SEC) team as a return specialist in his senior year and was the first player in school history to score a rushing, receiving, and punt return touchdown in the same season.

== Professional career ==
=== Pre-draft ===
Bray did not receive an invite to the 2015 NFL Combine.

Pre-draft measurables
Height	Weight	Arm length	Hand span	40-yard dash	10-yard split	20-yard split	20-yard shuttle	Three-cone drill	Vertical jump	Broad jump	Bench press
5 ft 10 in (1.78 m)	183 lb (83 kg)	30 1/2 in (0.77 m)	9 1/4 in (0.23 m)	4.50 s	1.56 s	2.58 s	4.28 s	6.87 s	34.0 in (0.86 m)	9 ft 8 in (2.95 m)	12 reps
All values from Auburn Pro Day

=== Indianapolis Colts ===
After going undrafted in the 2015 NFL draft, Bray was signed by the Indianapolis Colts on May 5, 2015. During training camp, Bray caught the eye of several Colts coaches.

Bray was waived by the Colts on September 5, 2015 and was signed to the practice squad on September 6, 2015. On October 27, Bray was elevated to the active roster after wide receiver Phillip Dorsett suffered a fractured fibula.

On October 18, 2016, Bray was placed on injured reserve.

On November 7, 2017, Bray was placed on injured reserve. He was released with an injury settlement on December 26, 2017.

=== Buffalo Bills ===
Bray at Buffalo Bills training camp in 2018

On December 30, 2017, Bray was signed to the Buffalo Bills' practice squad. He signed a reserve/future contract with the Bills on January 8, 2018. He was released on August 5, 2018.

=== Houston Texans ===
On August 12, 2018, Bray signed with the Houston Texans. He was waived on September 1, 2018.

=== Birmingham Iron ===
In 2019, Bray joined the Birmingham Iron of the Alliance of American Football (AAF). He was placed on injured reserve after the third game of the season on February 25, 2019. He was waived from injured reserve on March 26. He was added to the team's rights list and re-signed to a contract on April 1.

=== Montreal Alouettes ===
After the AAF ceased operations in April 2019, Bray signed with the Montreal Alouettes of the Canadian Football League (CFL) on May 19, 2019. In his first season, Bray caught 58 passes for 818 yards with six touchdowns. He also returned 16 kicks on special teams for 168 yards. He was released on February 16, 2021, and re-signed with the team on a one-year contract on March 15, 2021. He was placed on the suspended list on July 6, 2021 as the team wanted to retain his rights as he was delayed attempting to cross the border into Canada. One week later he was transferred to the active roster once he completed his mandatory seven-day quarantine period for training camp. Bray played in 12 games for the Alouettes during the 2021 season, catching 35 passes for 481 yards with two touchdowns. He also returned 12 punts. Bray was released by the Alouettes as part of the team's final roster cuts before the start of the 2022 regular season.

=== Ottawa Redblacks ===
On October 5, 2022, it was announced that Bray had signed a practice roster agreement with the Ottawa Redblacks. He remained on the practice roster and did not play in 2022. In 2023, he played in two games where he recorded seven receptions for 153 yards. However, after it became known that Bray was facing criminal charges in Montreal, he was released by the Redblacks on June 29, 2023.

=== Professional statistics ===
==== NFL ====
Season	Team	G	Receiving					Rushing			Kickoff returns					Punt returns					Fumbles	
Season	Team	G	Rec	Yds	Avg	Lng	TD	Rush	Yds	TD	Ret	Yds	Avg	Lng	TD	Ret	RetY	Avg	Lng	TD	Fum	Lost
2015	IND	9	0	0	0.0	0	0	0	0	0	21	570	27.1	60	0	21	166	7.9	33	0	0	0
2016	IND	6	3	36	12.0	22	0	1	7	0	9	231	25.7	39	0	7	58	8.3	20	0	0	0
2017	IND	9	3	39	13.0	22	0	0	0	0	18	430	23.9	60	0	17	90	5.3	20	0	1	0
Total		24	6	75	12.5	22	0	1	7	0	48	1,231	25.6	60	0	45	314	7.0	33	0	1	0

==== CFL ====
Season	Team	G	Receiving					Rushing			Kickoff returns					Punt returns				
Season	Team	G	Rec	Yds	Avg	Lng	TD	Rush	Yds	TD	Ret	Yds	Avg	Lng	TD	Ret	RetY	Avg	Lng	TD
2019	MTL	15	58	818	14.1	75	6	1	6	0	2	45	22.5	28	0	14	123	8.8	16	0
2021	MTL	12	35	481	13.7	68	2	0	0	0	0	0	0	0	0	12	68	5.7	14	0
Total		27	93	1,299	14.0	75	8	1	6	0	2	45	22.5	28	0	26	191	7.3	16	0

== Personal life ==
On July 3, 2011, Bray's mother Tonya was murdered by his father, Jeffrey Jones. Jones pled guilty and was sentenced to life in prison without the possibility of parole.

Bray was arrested in September 2012 on the campus of West Georgia during a traffic stop. He was charged for playing his music too loud and possession of alcohol by a minor.

On February 18, 2020, Bray and former Auburn teammate Greg Robinson were stopped by Border Patrol officers south of El Paso, Texas. Border Control agents found 157 pounds of marijuana in vacuum-sealed bags, $3,100 in cash, and an electronic scale. Both men were charged with felony possession with intent to distribute, and face up to 20 years in prison.
