= Prayer at Jordan–Hare =

2013 Georgia–Auburn college football game

2013 Georgia vs. Auburn "Prayer at Jordan–Hare"
Georgia Bulldogs	Auburn Tigers
(6–3)	(9–1)
38	43
Head coach: Mark Richt	Head coach: Gus Malzahn
AP / Coaches / BCS; 25 / NR / 25	AP / Coaches / BCS; 7 / 9 / 7
	1	2	3	4	Total
Georgia	0	10	7	21	38
Auburn	10	17	7	9	43
- Date: November 16, 2013
- Season: 2013
- Stadium: Jordan–Hare Stadium
- Location: Auburn, Alabama
- Favorite: Auburn by 3
- Referee: Penn Wagers
- Attendance: 87,451

United States TV coverage
- Network: CBS
- Announcers: Verne Lundquist (play-by-play); Gary Danielson (color); Tracy Wolfson (sideline)
- Nielsen ratings: 3.5

The Prayer at Jordan–Hare was a touchdown from a Hail Mary pass thrown during a college football game between the Auburn Tigers and Georgia Bulldogs, played on November 16, 2013, at Jordan–Hare Stadium in Auburn in the 117th installment of the Deep South's Oldest Rivalry.

Down 38–37 against the No. 25-ranked Bulldogs with 36 seconds remaining in the game, the No. 7-ranked Tigers faced 4th down and 18 yards to go when junior quarterback Nick Marshall threw a 73-yard touchdown pass to sophomore wide receiver Ricardo Louis. The pass was accidentally tipped by Georgia's sophomore safety Josh Harvey-Clemons and freshman Tray Matthews as each tried to catch the ball. This accidental deflection surprised Louis, but it allowed Louis to catch the ball and to run away from both Harvey-Clemons and Matthews into the end zone for the game-winning touchdown. The score allowed Auburn to take a 43–38 lead that it held to break the tie in the all-time Georgia–Auburn American football series.

== Name ==
As teammates sprinted to congratulate Ricardo Louis in the end zone, Auburn IMG Sports Network commentator Rod Bramblett exclaimed "A miracle in Jordan-Hare! A miracle in Jordan-Hare!" in utter jubilation, his voice carried across the nation on radio stations broadcasting the game. Within four days, T-shirts were being sold with Bramblett's words "Miracle at Jordan-Hare" printed across the top. Other sources modified the phrase, The War Eagle Reader dubbing the moment "The Miracle in Jordan-Hare," The Gadsden Times proclaiming the play "Marshall's Miracle" and USA Today pitching several titles including "The Marshall Miracle."

On the same day, at 10:44 p.m. CST, a story entitled "The Prayer at Jordan-Hare! Auburn wins 43–38!" was posted to the website of Huntsville's NBC affiliate WAFF. Within days the title had been replicated or simultaneously concocted by writers with The Birmingham News, USA Today, The Montgomery Advertiser, WRBL in Columbus, Georgia and Fox Sports among many others. The phrase gained popularity among Auburn fans, the slogan incorporating their stadium with a catchy rhyme and the phrase seemingly intertwined with the 1986 Bon Jovi hit "Livin' on a Prayer," a popular anthem played at Auburn football games. Many titles sprung forth over the following week including "The Hail Aubie" in reference to the name of Auburn's mascot tiger, "The Saint Louis Arch" fusing the receiver's surname with the arc-like path of Marshall's throw as a pun on the famous landmark arch in St. Louis, "Tip to the Lou" as an alteration of the children's song "Skip to My Lou" and "The Inaccurate Reception" as a modification of the renowned "Immaculate Reception" in the 1972 AFC semifinals.

The website AL.com posted an online poll to allow fans to vote on the above titles, adding "Tip, Georgia, Tip" as a takeoff of the legendary game Punt Bama Punt, "Dawg Gone Miracle" as the victory came against the Bulldogs, "Nick of Time" using Marshall's first name, "The Miracle on the Plains" as the nickname for Auburn, Alabama is "The Loveliest Village on the Plains" penned by poet Oliver Goldsmith and "The Miracu-Louis Reception." The poll included another frequently published title "The Immaculate Deflection," one of the three most popular in voting results along with "Tip to the Lou" and "The Prayer at Jordan-Hare." The title was even printed on shirts and posters by various companies.

== Rivalry ==
The Auburn–Georgia rivalry is one of the oldest in the NCAA, dating back to 1892. Because of this, it is nicknamed the "Deep South's Oldest Rivalry". Weeks before the 2013 Auburn–Georgia game, The Roosevelts website ranked this rivalry as the 13th greatest in college football. There were 116 matchups across 121 college football seasons preceding 2013.

- In the first meeting in 1892, Auburn won 10–0.
- In 1896, Georgia won 12–6 to complete its first undefeated season under coach Pop Warner.
- In 1916, Auburn won 3–0 after its kicker Moon Ducote kicked a 40-yard field goal off of Auburn player Legare Hairston's leather helmet. This resulted in a rule change clarifying that field goals must be kicked directly off of the ground.
- In 1942, Auburn handed Georgia its lone loss of the season, 27–13. That Georgia team would beat UCLA in the Rose Bowl and claim a national championship.
- In 1959, Georgia quarterback Fran Tarkenton led a comeback to a 14–13 Georgia victory, as Georgia snapped a 6-game losing streak in the series.
- In 1982, two future Heisman Trophy winners faced off in this game, Georgia's junior running back Herschel Walker and Auburn's freshman running back Bo Jackson. Walker led No. 1 ranked Georgia to a narrow 19–14 defeat of unranked Auburn.
- In 1983, Auburn's 13–7 victory over Georgia resulted in the Tigers claiming an SEC championship.
- In 1986, Georgia won as three-touchdown underdogs at Auburn 20–16. When Georgia fans stormed the field, the sprinkler system and hoses went off soaking people both on the field and in the stands.
- In 1994, Georgia ended Auburn's 20-game winning streak with a 23–23 tie, the last tie in the series before overtime was introduced. In 1996, Georgia defeated Auburn in four overtime periods 56–49, 4OT; it was the first SEC game to go to overtime.
- In 2002, No. 7 Georgia defeated No. 22 Auburn 24–21 to secure its first SEC Championship Game appearance. Georgia would win its first SEC championship since 1982 later that season.
- In 2004, No. 3 Auburn defeated No. 8 Georgia 24–6. That Auburn team would finish an undefeated (13-0) season with a win over Virginia Tech in the Sugar Bowl and claimed a national championship.

On November 16, 2013, No. 7 (BCS) Auburn (9–1, 5–1 SEC) hosted No. 25 (BCS) Georgia (6–3, 4–2 SEC) at Jordan-Hare Stadium in Auburn, Alabama with the series tied at 54–54–8. Auburn was seeking revenge for a 38–0 loss to Georgia the previous season.

Auburn had struggled in the 2012 season, the program's worst since 1950, finishing with a 3–9 record while going winless in the SEC. The team's plummet from a 2010 national championship claim to the bottom of the conference was the worst two-year decline for any college football team since the introduction of the Associated Press poll in 1936. This resulted in the firing of head coach Gene Chizik and hiring of Gus Malzahn. Adding insult to injury, on April 23, 2013, Auburn's landmark oak trees at Toomer's Corner were cut down, declared unsalvageable after being poisoned by Harvey Updyke, Jr., an Alabama fan, during the weekend of December 3, 2010. The 130-year old trees held a special place in the hearts of Auburn fans who rolled them with toilet paper after each football victory for at least forty years.

== Game ==
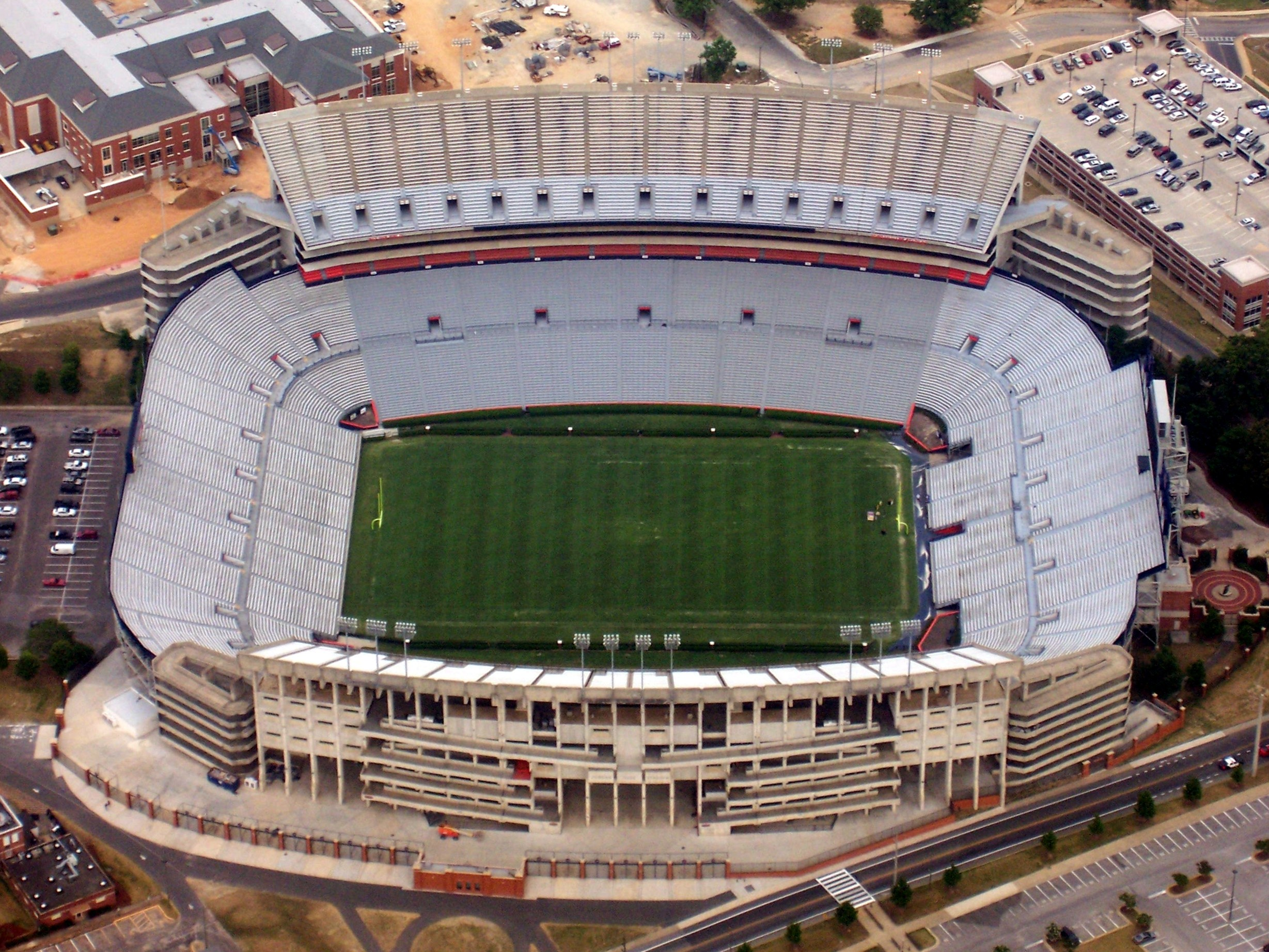
Jordan–Hare Stadium

The 2013 Auburn–Georgia game was held on November 16, and featured two programs moving in opposite directions. The Georgia Bulldogs, ranked No. 5 in the preseason AP Poll, had dropped to a disappointing No. 25 after losses to Clemson, Missouri and Vanderbilt. Meanwhile, the Auburn Tigers had been unranked until the 8th week of the season when they debuted in the AP Poll at No. 24, riding a six-game win streak in their ascension to the No. 7 spot by the Georgia game. Observers speculated that the return of the Bulldogs' starting running back Todd Gurley from an ankle injury would bolster Georgia's chances of an upset.

At 2:40 p.m. CST, with overcast skies and 66 degrees, Georgia's Marshall Morgan kicked off to Auburn whose 16-play, 56-yard opening drive stalled at the Georgia 5-yard line. The Tigers settled for a 22-yard Cody Parkey field goal. Auburn dominated the first half, scoring on five of their first six drives. With 1:07 remaining in the half, the SEC touchdown leader Tre Mason scampered for a 24-yard touchdown giving the Tigers a commanding 27–7 lead. Meanwhile, Georgia had gone three-and-out on three of their first four drives. They rounded out their final two drives by throwing an interception and scoring a late field goal to make the halftime score 27–10. Both teams squandered an opportunity for three additional points during the game, points that would have been crucial to the outcome of the game. With 3:10 left in the 2nd quarter, Auburn's Cody Parkey had a 36-yard field goal attempt blocked. In the 3rd quarter, Georgia elected not to allow sophomore kicker Marshall Morgan to attempt what would have been a 56-yard field goal despite the fact that he had hit that distance before. Instead Georgia elected to keep their offensive players on the field for the fourth down play—an incomplete pass thrown by Murray. This resulted in Auburn's offense getting the ball.

Through the first 50 minutes of the game, Auburn had scored on seven of nine possessions with 29 first downs building a 37–17 lead. In contrast, when Georgia began their first possession of the fourth quarter they had only reached the end zone once on their previous six drives. Auburn maintained that 20-point lead until 9:35 left in the game when Georgia quarterback Aaron Murray threw a 5-yard touchdown pass to senior Rantavious Wooten to cut the deficit to 13 points. After another touchdown and trailing 37–31, Georgia's offense started at Auburn's 45-yard line after a short punt, and drove 38 yards setting up 1st-and-goal at Auburn's 7-yard line. The drive stalled when the Bulldogs gained only two yards on three plays. The Bulldogs elected to keep their offensive players on the field for the 4th down and goal play. Aaron Murray ran 11 yards line on a quarterback sneak to score a controversial touchdown that gave Georgia a 38–37 lead. When instant replay was shown, some thought Murray's left knee made contact with the ground prior to the football crossing the goal line after colliding with Auburn defenders Jake Holland and Ryan Smith. That would have nullified the score and Auburn's offense would have taken over on downs with a 6-point lead. However, the officials unable to find indisputable evidence to overturn the touchdown ruling on the field. The officials counted the touchdown, which was Murray's last score away from Georgia's home field. Overall, Murray would lead his team to three touchdowns in the span of 7:46, the final touchdown giving Georgia their first lead of the game with 1:49 remaining.

While the Bulldogs had scored on three consecutive drives, Auburn failed to earn a single first down in the entire fourth quarter until one minute remained on the clock. After the ensuing kickoff, Auburn's offense took over at the 22-yard line having scored only three points in their previous four drives. Their stagnant offense had not found the end zone in over 23 minutes of play and had only crossed the 50-yard line once since their opening drive of the second half. After gaining a first down at their own 35-yard line, Auburn lost eight yards on the next three plays culminating with Jordan Jenkins' sack of Nick Marshall. With 36 seconds left, Auburn used its second of three timeouts to discuss their fourth down play. As Auburn retook the field, Georgia used its first timeout to discuss their fourth down defense. Auburn needed 18 yards for a first down that would keep their chance for a victory alive.

== Play ==
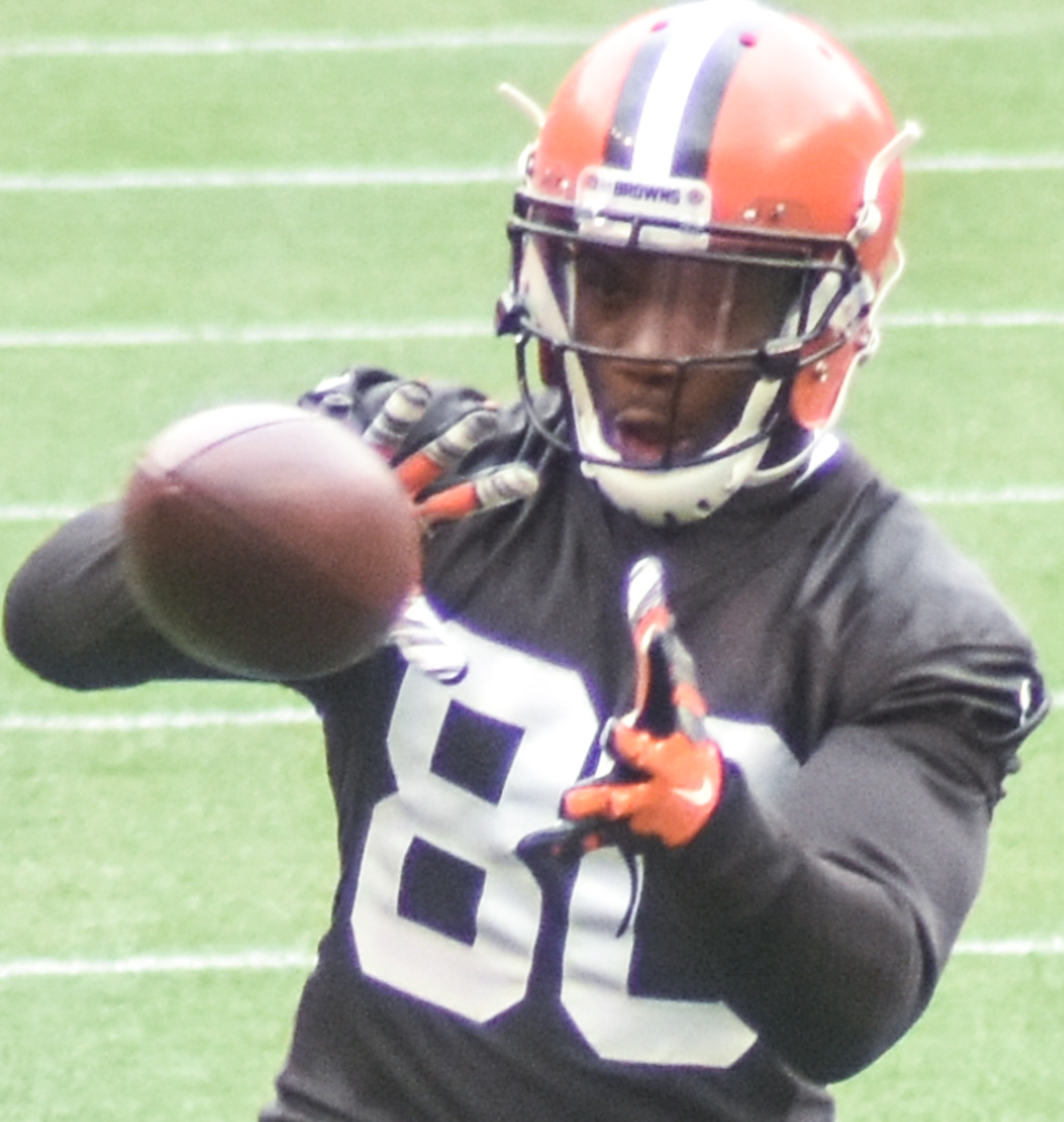
Ricardo Louis (pictured in 2016) caught the deflected pass from Nick Marshall for a 73-yard touchdown to give the Tigers a 43–38 lead

During the timeout Malzahn called a play he dubbed "Little Rock," something he had drawn up late in 1998 while coaching Shiloh Christian School in the Arkansas state playoffs. The play involved one receiver running deep on a post route while another would run a shallow dig route far enough to make the first down. Typically this play did not call for sophomore Ricardo Louis to be on the field but Malzahn said "Let's put Ricardo at five (the deep post route) and Sammie on the boundary (the shallow dig route)." The pass was designed to go to the shallow receiver, sophomore Sammie Coates, for a first down. But the planned deep receiver Louis begged quarterback Nick Marshall to throw him the ball instead. Louis dreamed of making a big play, inspired by the words of his receiver coach Dameyune Craig who frequently challenged his players with the question "What's going to be your legacy?".

Both teams took the field after consecutive timeouts, Auburn facing 4th down and 18 from their own 27-yard line with 36 seconds remaining in the game. Marshall took the snap and made a five-step drop to his own 17-yard line. Sammie Coates found himself wide open near midfield, but Nick Marshall stepped up to the 20-yard line and heaved the ball 47 yards downfield to Ricardo Louis in triple coverage. Coates dropped his head, too nervous to watch the outcome. The overthrown pass sailed beyond Marshall's intended receiver as Georgia's freshman safety Tray Matthews leapt for the interception at the 23-yard line. But his teammate, sophomore defender Josh Harvey-Clemons, also jumped for the interception and tipped the ball with his right hand causing it to ricochet over Matthews' helmet. The redirection allowed the overthrown Auburn receiver to catch up to the pass.

Auburn's Louis could not initially find the deflection as the football fluttered over his head, but his peripheral vision located the ball over his left shoulder just as it reached his outstretched hands. Louis juggled the ball at the 15-yard line, finally gained control at the 9, looked over his left shoulder finding no one in pursuit and bounded into the south end zone for the touchdown with 25 seconds remaining. Terrified suspension turned into roaring triumphant celebration from the stunned crowd as Louis reeled in the catch. A 7-play, 78-yard drive had just been capped off by a 73-yard score as the Tigers took the lead 43–38. Penalty flags lay on the field, but the fouls were against Georgia players for taking their helmets off while the play was still going. This meant the play counted as a touchdown for Auburn.

== Broadcaster calls ==
- Commentators Verne Lundquist and Gary Danielson called the game on television nationally for CBS's SEC coverage.

This is how Lundquist called the play:

Fourth-and-18 ... lets it go ... OH MY GOODNESS! OH MY GOODNESS! OH NO! Ricardo Louis! ... Talk about a Hail Mary.

Gary Danielson added his assessment after the play:

It's the play of the year! Number 25, Josh Harvey-Clemons, actually knocks it out of Tray Matthews' hands—number 28. It bounces up in the air for the most improbable touchdown you'll ever see ... and Louis, a miracle of miracles.

- Commentators Rod Bramblett and Stan White called the game on radio for the Auburn IMG Sports Network. When Bramblett later reflected on calling the play, he doubted anything would ever compare to it and admitted he was not sure of the words he had chosen in his excitement.

Here is how he called the play:

Alright, here we go, fourth-and-18 for the Tigers. Here's your ballgame. Nick Marshall … stands in, steps up, is going to throw downfield. Just a homerun ball and uh, it is tipped up ... AND LOUIS CAUGHT IT ON THE DEFLECTION! LOUIS IS GOING TO SCORE! LOUIS IS GOING TO SCORE! LOUIS IS GOING TO SCORE! TOUCHDOWN AUBURN! TOUCHDOWN AUBURN! A MIRACLE IN JORDAN–HARE! A MIRACLE IN JORDAN–HARE! SEVENTY-THREE YARDS AND THE TIGERS, WITH 25 SECONDS TO GO, LEAD 43–38!

Bramblett concluded the game by calling the final play and celebration as follows:

Here's Murray. Steps up, in trouble, he's on the run, hit as he throws, INCOMPLETE! TIGERS WIN! TIGERS WIN! DEE FORD KNOCKED THE BALL LOOSE! AND AUBURN HAS DONE IT IN UNBELIEVABLE, REMARKABLE, UNLIKELY, INCREDIBLE FASHION! 43–38! WAR EAGLE EVERYBODY!

- Scott Howard and Eric Zeier called the game on the radio for the Georgia Bulldogs Sports Network.

Here is Scott Howard's coverage of the notable touchdown:

There's the snap, Marshall back, looking, looking, in the pocket, going to go DEEP DOWN THE FIELD, AND THAT BALL WILL BE ... OH MY GOD! TIPPED AND CAUGHT! TOUCHDOWN AUBURN! HOLY SMOKES, I DON'T BELIEVE IT ... THEY HAD A MAN RUNNING IN STRIDE AND CAUGHT THE TIP for a touchdown, but there's flags back on the field.

Eric Zeier responded to the penalty flags on the field by adding:

That's going to be on us for taking off our helmets just in disbelief. And I'll tell you what, that ball should have been intercepted. If we don't touch it, nothing happens on the play. We bounced it up in the air right into the hands ... I believe it was Ricardo Louis.

The flags were actually thrown for offsetting unsportsmanlike penalties, one for Georgia players removing their helmets and one against defensive lineman Gabe Wright for excessive celebration.

== Final drive ==
Following the final touchdown, Auburn attempted a two-point conversion to extend the lead to seven points but the attempt failed when CJ Uzomah fell short of the end zone after catching a pass from Jonathan Wallace. Georgia was left with 25 seconds in the game at their own 25-yard line after Auburn's Cody Parkey kicked the ball beyond the end zone for a touchback as he had on all nine of his kickoffs during the game. In the following 22 seconds, Aaron Murray threw two passes for 50 yards as Georgia reached Auburn's 25-yard line. When Auburn senior lineman and leading tackler Dee Ford jumped offside, Georgia advanced to the Auburn 20-yard line with a first down and three seconds on the clock. Auburn called their final timeout.

On the last play of the game Ford hit Murray at the 20-yard line as he released an incomplete pass sealing the victory for Auburn. Georgia coach Richt felt the hit could have been penalized for targeting but even Murray himself disagreed, calling it a clean hit.

The teams combined for 81 total points in the game, second only to the 1996 quadruple overtime thriller in which Auburn and Georgia combined for 105 points.

== Scoring summary ==
Scoring summary

Quarter	Time	Drive			Team	Scoring information	Score	
Quarter	Time	Plays	Yards	TOP	Team	Scoring information	Georgia	Auburn
1	8:15	15	56	6:45	Auburn	22-yard field goal by Cody Parkey	0	3
1	4:29	6	63	2:34	Auburn	Corey Grant 21-yard touchdown run, Cody Parkey kick good	0	10
2	13:07	10	41	5:10	Auburn	35-yard field goal by Cody Parkey	0	13
2	10:11	8	75	2:56	Georgia	Todd Gurley 9-yard touchdown run, Marshall Morgan kick good	7	13
2	8:32	6	73	1:39	Auburn	Nick Marshall 6-yard touchdown run, Cody Parkey kick good	7	20
2	1:07	6	61	1:43	Auburn	Tre Mason 24-yard touchdown run, Cody Parkey kick good	7	27
2	0:00	9	55	1:00	Georgia	37-yard field goal by Marshall Morgan	10	27
3	11:01	9	61	3:59	Georgia	Aaron Murray 16-yard touchdown run, Marshall Morgan kick good	17	27
3	8:47	7	77	2:14	Auburn	Nick Marshall 5-yard touchdown run, Cody Parkey kick good	17	34
4	12:39	9	46	5:32	Auburn	32-yard field goal by Cody Parkey	17	37
4	9:35	9	60	3:04	Georgia	Rantavious Wooten 4-yard touchdown reception from Aaron Murray, Marshall Morgan kick good	24	37
4	5:59	5	56	1:26	Georgia	Arthur Lynch 24-yard touchdown reception from Aaron Murray, Marshall Morgan kick good	31	37
4	1:49	9	45	3:12	Georgia	Aaron Murray 5-yard touchdown run, Marshall Morgan kick good	38	37
4	0:25	8	77	1:24	Auburn	Ricardo Louis 73-yard touchdown reception from Nick Marshall, 2-point pass failed	38	43
"TOP" = time of possession. For other American football terms, see Glossary of American football.							38	43

== Aftermath ==
The play was featured on SportsCenter that evening as ESPN's top play of the day in the world of sports. Murray commented on the loss to Auburn stating, "It's like a nightmare. This is going to be a tough one to get over."

One week later, as Georgia hosted Kentucky with 2:17 left in the 1st half, Murray suffered a torn ACL, ending his college career.

Auburn's victory propelled them into the AP top five over the next week. On the same day, #4 ranked Stanford was upset by unranked USC 20–17, allowing Auburn to be promoted to #6 in the subsequent AP Poll. The following Saturday during Auburn's bye week, two upsets occurred by a combined 58 points when unranked Arizona knocked off #5 ranked Oregon and #10 Oklahoma State defeated #3 Baylor. Auburn was promoted to #4 in the AP Poll as a result.

This loss, combined with South Carolina's victory over Florida the same day, knocked Georgia out of contention for the SEC East title. Georgia would fall out of the BCS standings and most of the major polls after this loss, and a win over unranked Kentucky the next week was not enough to get the team back in the rankings. With backup QB Hutson Mason making his first start for Georgia in their season-ending in-state rivalry with Georgia Tech, Georgia won 41-34 in double overtime. Georgia finished the regular season at #23 on the AP poll and #22 on the BCS standings, and was defeated by Nebraska 24–19 in the 2014 Gator Bowl.

In their next game, Auburn hosted in-state rival and #1 ranked Alabama in the season-ending Iron Bowl, whose winner would also clinch the SEC's western division. Tied 28–28 with one second remaining in regulation, Alabama attempted to kick a game-winning field goal, but it fell short and was caught by Chris Davis, who returned it for a 100-yard touchdown to win the game 34–28. Auburn went on to beat Missouri in the 2013 SEC Championship Game. This win, along with #10 Michigan State defeating the #2 Ohio State in the Big Ten championship, pushed Auburn to #2 in the BCS rankings, and faced the #1 Florida State Seminoles in the 2014 BCS National Championship Game (where Auburn lost 34–31, ending the SEC's seven-year national championship reign).

A similar play known as the Hail Maryland happened during Week 8 of the 2024 NFL season between the Washington Commanders and Chicago Bears where the Commanders won after catching a Hail Mary pass in the end zone that was deflected by a Bears player at the goal line as time expired.

== Nominations and awards ==
Nick Marshall's last-second 73-yard touchdown pass was recognized as one of four nominees for 2013 Best Play in the world of sports at the 2014 ESPY Awards under the name Auburn Hail Mary. But another Auburn play won the category, Davis FG return, which was the final play of Auburn's following game (the 2013 Iron Bowl).

== See also ==
- Kick Six – An Auburn win in similar fashion in the Tigers' next game, two weeks later
- Hail Mary Between the Hedges – Another game with a similar ending, this one involving Tennessee and Georgia
- Bluegrass Miracle – A 2002 game between LSU and Kentucky that ended in similar fashion
- Miracle on Markham – Another game from 2002 that saw LSU and Arkansas play in a game with a similar ending
- List of nicknamed college football games and plays
