= Kick Six =

Final play of the 2013 Iron Bowl

Coordinates: 32°36′9.391″N 85°29′20.3324″W

78th Iron Bowl
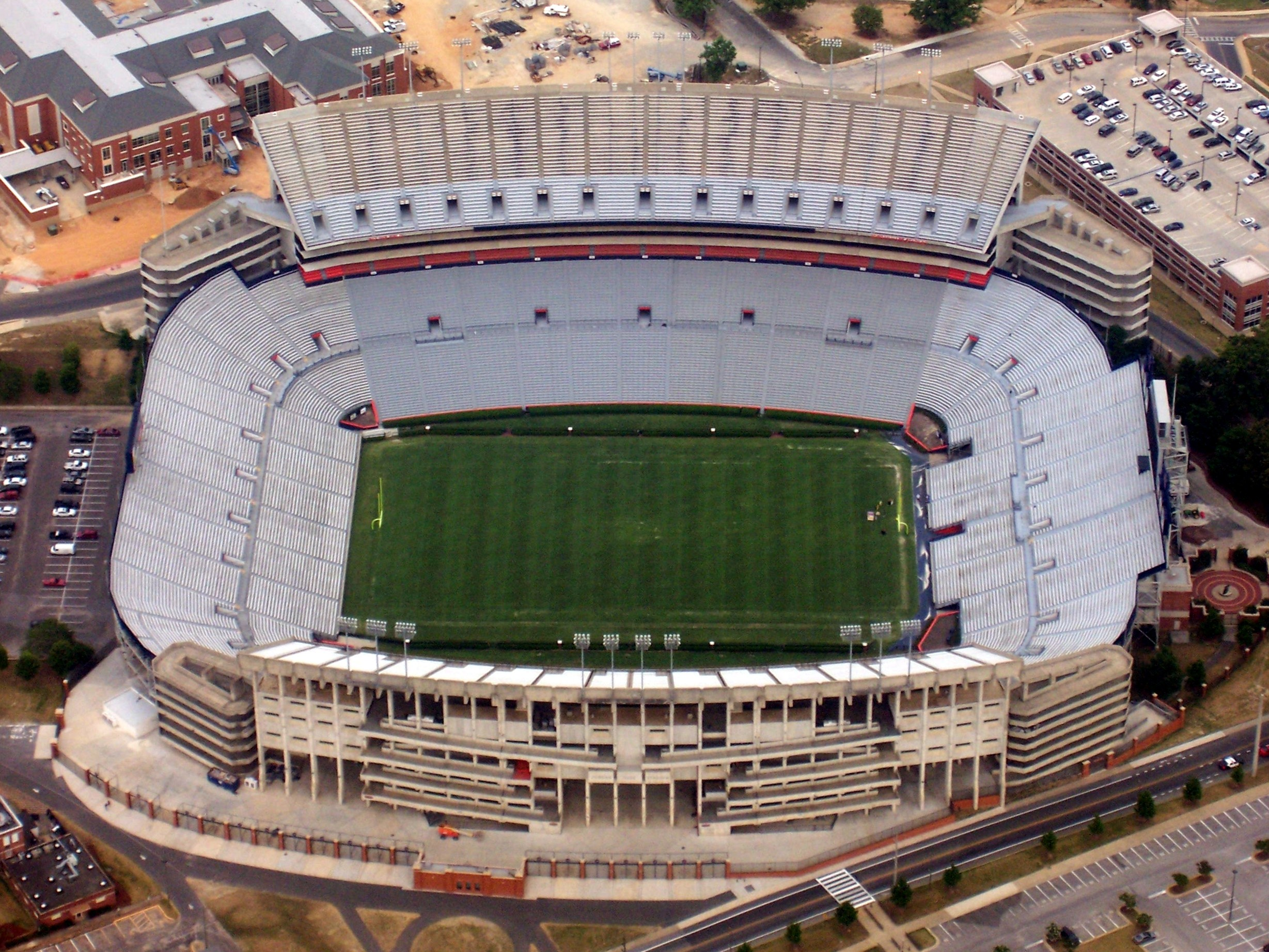
- Jordan–Hare Stadium, the site of the game.
Alabama Crimson Tide	Auburn Tigers
(11–0)	(10–1)
28	34
Head coach: Nick Saban	Head coach: Gus Malzahn
AP / Coaches / BCS; 1 / 1 / 1	AP / Coaches / BCS; 4 / 5 / 4
	1	2	3	4	Total
Alabama	0	21	0	7	28
Auburn	7	7	7	13	34
- Date: November 30, 2013
- Season: 2013
- Stadium: Jordan–Hare Stadium
- Location: Auburn, Alabama
- Favorite: Alabama by 10
- Referee: Matt Austin
- Attendance: 87,451

United States TV coverage
- Network: CBS
- Announcers: Verne Lundquist (play-by-play); Gary Danielson (color); Tracy Wolfson (sideline)
- Nielsen ratings: 8.2

The Kick Six (also known as Kick Bama Kick) was the final play of the 78th Iron Bowl college football game played on November 30, 2013, at Jordan–Hare Stadium in Auburn, Alabama. The game featured the No. 1–ranked and two-time defending national champion Alabama Crimson Tide (11–0, 7–0 in the SEC) as a 10-point favorite over the No. 4-ranked Auburn Tigers (10–1, 6–1 in the SEC). The game had significant postseason implications, with both teams ranked in the top 5 and a berth to the SEC Championship Game and, potentially, the BCS National Championship Game, at stake.

After falling behind in the 2nd quarter and then again in the 4th, Auburn rallied to tie the game at 28–28 with 32 seconds remaining. After the ensuing kickoff, Alabama quickly moved to the Auburn 38-yard line, at which point the clock ran out, seemingly sending the game to overtime. Alabama coach Nick Saban challenged the timekeeping call and one second was put back on the clock after a video review. The Crimson Tide lined up for a potential game-winning 57-yard field goal and the kick was short, allowing Auburn's Chris Davis, who had been positioned near the goal line, to catch the ball just in front of the goal posts. Davis ran across the entire field through players from both teams to the opposite end zone, improbably scoring the winning touchdown for Auburn on the last play of the game.

The game was played in front of a sellout crowd of 87,451 and televised nationwide on CBS, posting an 8.2 Nielsen rating with over 13 million viewers during the final half-hour, making it the most watched regular season game of the 2013 college football season. Some sportswriters have argued that Davis' return is the single greatest moment in college football history. At the 2014 ESPY Awards, it was named the best play and the best game of the year in all of North American sports. In the years following the game, the name "Kick Six", a variant of the term "pick-six", has been commonly used to identify both the final play and the game.

Following the game, Alabama played in the Sugar Bowl, falling to Oklahoma 45–31. Auburn won the SEC Championship Game and went on to play in the BCS National Championship Game, where they lost to Florida State, 34–31.

== Background ==
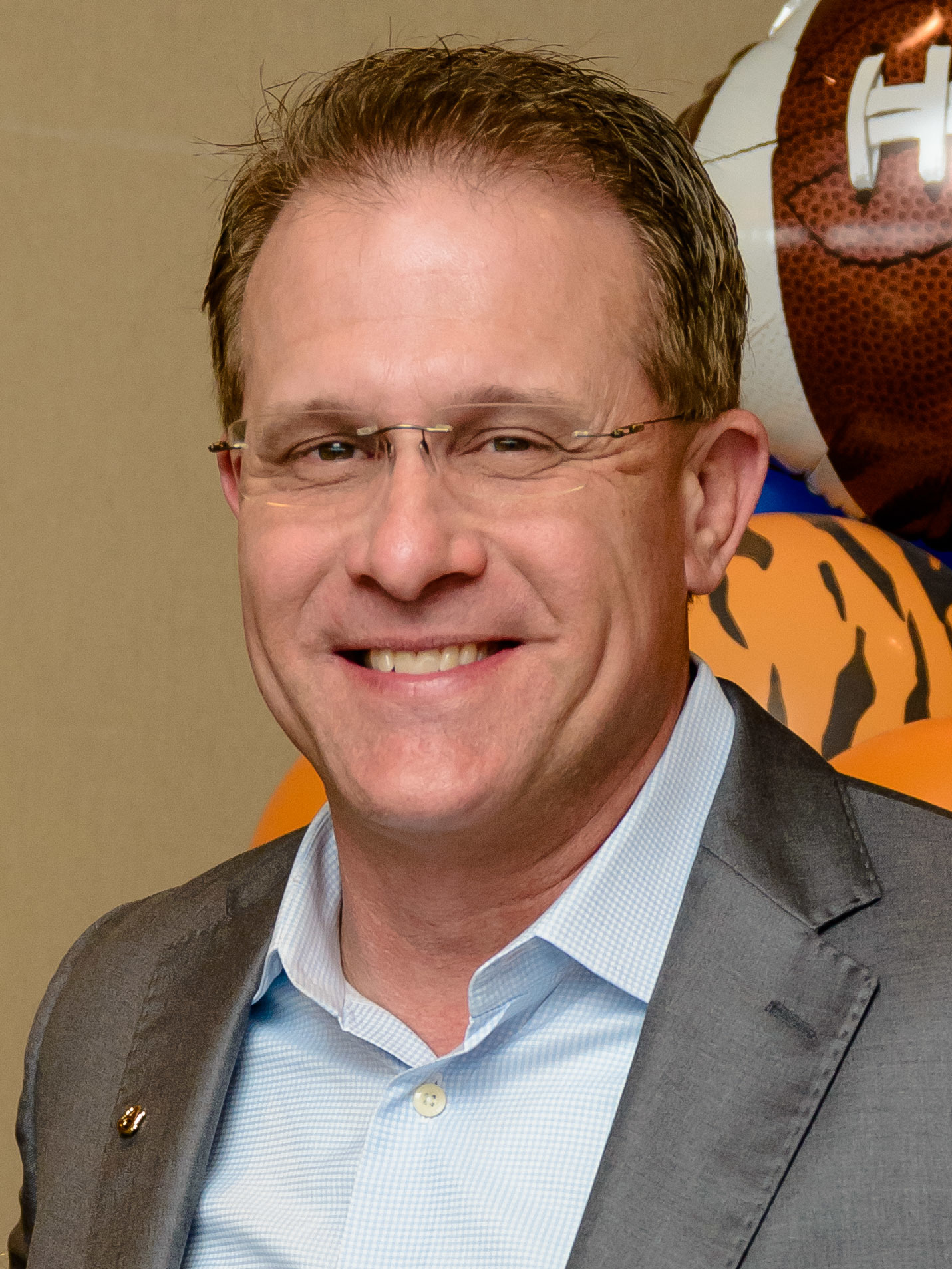
Following a 3–9 season in 2012, Auburn hired Gus Malzahn as their head coach.

The football programs representing the University of Alabama and Auburn University first met in 1893 and have played every year since 1948. Over time the two in-state foes developed a rivalry (culminating every year at the Iron Bowl) that is considered to be one of the best and fiercest in all of college football. Entering the game, Alabama held the series lead with a 42–34–1 record.

The two teams came into the 2013 season following drastically different 2012 seasons. Despite an upset at the hands of Texas A&M, Alabama ultimately finished as SEC champions after a close game against the Georgia Bulldogs and went on to soundly defeat Notre Dame 42–14 for their second consecutive national title, and their third in four years, cementing themselves as a dynasty under head coach Nick Saban. Meanwhile, two years after their own National Championship victory, the Auburn Tigers suffered through their worst season in 60 years, finishing 3–9 with an 0–8 SEC record, capped by a 49–0 loss to Alabama in the 2012 Iron Bowl–their second consecutive blowout loss in the game. Head coach Gene Chizik was fired at the end of the season in favor of Arkansas State head coach and former Auburn offensive coordinator Gus Malzahn.

Alabama entered the 2013 season ranked #1 and remained at the top of the polls for the entire season, rolling through their schedule with relative ease, winning all but one of their games (Texas A&M) by more than 10 points. Auburn, on the other hand, entered the season unranked and did not enter the AP Poll until the midpoint of the season. Auburn's season was defined by a series of come-from-behind wins and close finishes. Auburn defeated Mississippi State in September on a late touchdown pass. The following month, No. 24 Auburn came from behind on the road to beat No. 7 Texas A&M. Following the victory against Texas A&M, Auburn was ranked #11 in the AP poll. Two weeks before the Iron Bowl, No. 7 Auburn defeated rival Georgia with a tipped Hail Mary pass known as the "Prayer at Jordan–Hare", setting the stage for a highly ranked Iron Bowl matchup.

Alabama was predicted by analysts to conclude the 2013–14 season with a BCS record third straight national title, their fourth in five years. The winner of the previous four Iron Bowls (2009–2012) went on to win the national championship: Alabama in 2009, 2011, and 2012, and Auburn in 2010. Entering the 2013 Iron Bowl, Alabama and Auburn were ranked No. 1 and No. 4 respectively in the BCS rankings, making it only the second matchup in the history of the rivalry to feature two Top 5 teams, and the highest-ranked Iron Bowl ever. It was also the first Iron Bowl in which both teams were playing for a berth to the SEC Championship. Alabama entered the game undefeated in the previous three years and 24 days in games played outside of their home field in Tuscaloosa, their last loss prior to those 18 consecutive road victories coming on November 6, 2010, at LSU.

With Alabama favored by 10 points, Auburn was a decided underdog in the eyes of most analysts. Marq Burnett of the Alabama-based Anniston Star went as far as to list seven reasons why Auburn could not beat Alabama, including Alabama's tough run defense, perceived unstoppable offense, and the superior coaching skills of Nick Saban over Gus Malzahn. Joel Erickson of The Birmingham News was one of the few writers to pick Auburn, predicting a score of 31–28. Similar predictions were shared during ESPN's College GameDay, which was broadcast live from outside Jordan–Hare Stadium prior to the game. The program's panel of Kirk Herbstreit, David Pollack, and Lee Corso, as well as Paul Finebaum, unanimously picked Alabama to win the game. Auburn alumnus and NBA on TNT personality Charles Barkley, who appeared as a celebrity guest, went against the panel and chose Auburn to win the game.

== Game recap ==
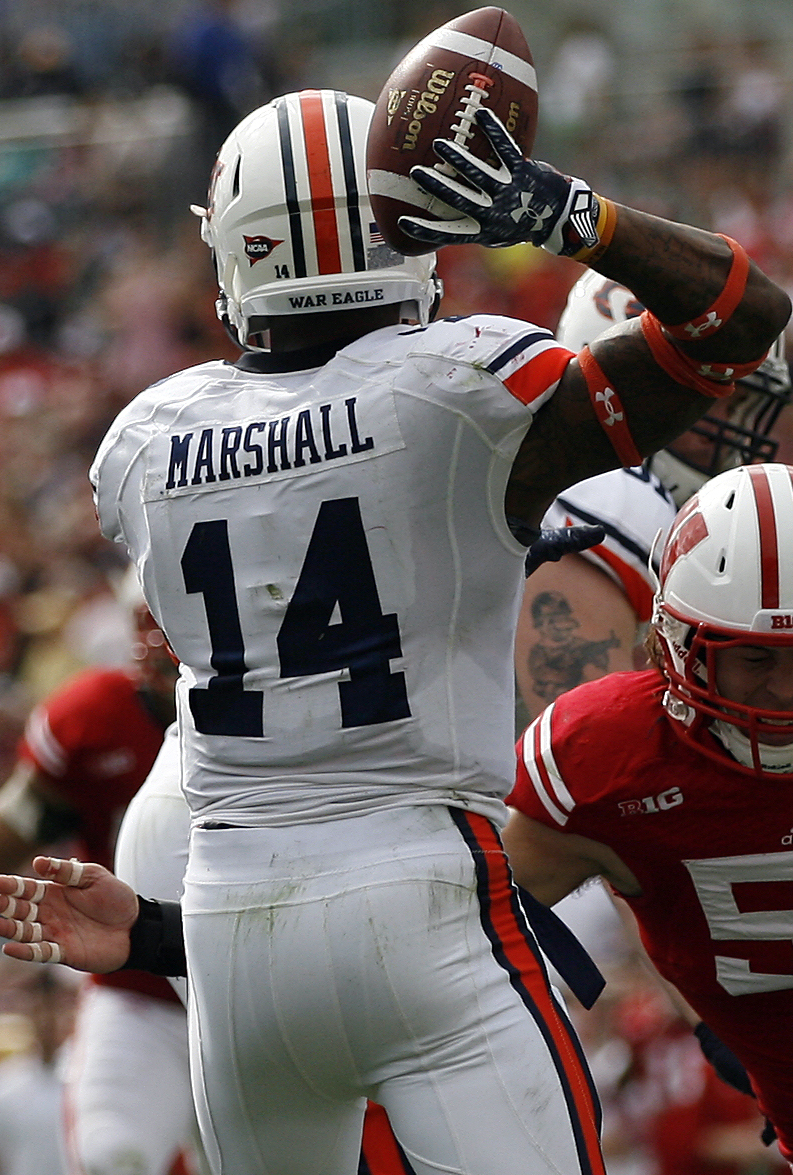
Auburn quarterback Nick Marshall scored the game's first points on a 45-yard touchdown run.

=== First quarter ===
The game began with Auburn's Cody Parkey kicking off to Alabama's Christion Jones, who returned the kick to the Alabama 24-yard line. On the game's first play from scrimmage, Alabama running back T.J. Yeldon ran for 31 yards into Auburn territory. Alabama then drove to the Auburn 26-yard line before Yeldon was stopped on 3rd and 2. On 4th down, Cade Foster attempted a 44-yard field goal for the Tide, but narrowly missed left. On Auburn's first offensive snap Corey Grant would run for 14 yards to the Auburn 42-yard line. The Tigers drive would soon stall out, with Ricardo Louis dropping a slightly off target deep pass on 3rd down, forcing a punt. Alabama was then held to seven yards, going three-and-out. After getting the ball back, Auburn's offense moved down the field with a seven-play, 66-yard drive capped off by a 45-yard touchdown run by quarterback Nick Marshall to give Auburn a 7–0 lead. It was the Tigers' first offensive touchdown against Alabama since 2010. On the ensuing drive, Alabama again went three-and-out and punted. Auburn's offensive spark was short-lived as the Tigers gained just 8 yards on their next drive and were forced to punt the ball back to Alabama. The quarter ended with Auburn leading 7–0.

=== Second quarter ===
Following a slow start in the first quarter, Alabama stormed back quickly with an 11-play, 67-yard touchdown drive culminating with an A.J. McCarron touchdown pass to Jalston Fowler to tie the game 7–7. On the next drive, Landon Collins forced and recovered a fumble of Auburn running back Tre Mason, giving the Tide the ball back with favorable field position. Alabama capitalized on the turnover with McCarron throwing his second touchdown pass of the quarter, this time to Kevin Norwood to make the score 14–7. The Tigers' woes continued on the following drive, losing 9 yards, going three and out, and punting the ball back to the Tide. Alabama took just five plays to drive the length of the field with Yeldon scoring on a 1-yard rush to move the score to 21–7 in favor of Alabama. On the following drive, the Auburn offense came back to life with a 40-yard Tre Mason rush sparking an 81-yard drive ending in a touchdown run by Mason to cut the deficit to 21–14 in favor of Alabama at halftime.

=== Third quarter ===
Under Saban, Alabama had a record of 73–3 when leading at halftime. Auburn received the kickoff in the second half and drove 69 yards to tie the game 21–21 on a C.J. Uzomah touchdown reception. On the following drive Alabama failed to gain a yard and punted the ball back to Auburn. Auburn drove into Alabama territory before stalling out and punting, downing the punt at the Alabama 1-yard line. On their first two plays of the drive, Alabama would gain just one yard. Facing a 3rd and 9 from their own 2-yard line, McCarron found Amari Cooper for a 54-yard completion to extend the drive. Alabama then drove to the Auburn 22, where on 1st down, McCarron threw to a streaking Cooper in the end zone but Cooper dropped the would-be touchdown. Following the drop Alabama picked up another first down to reach the Auburn 11-yard line as the quarter came to the a close.

=== Fourth quarter ===
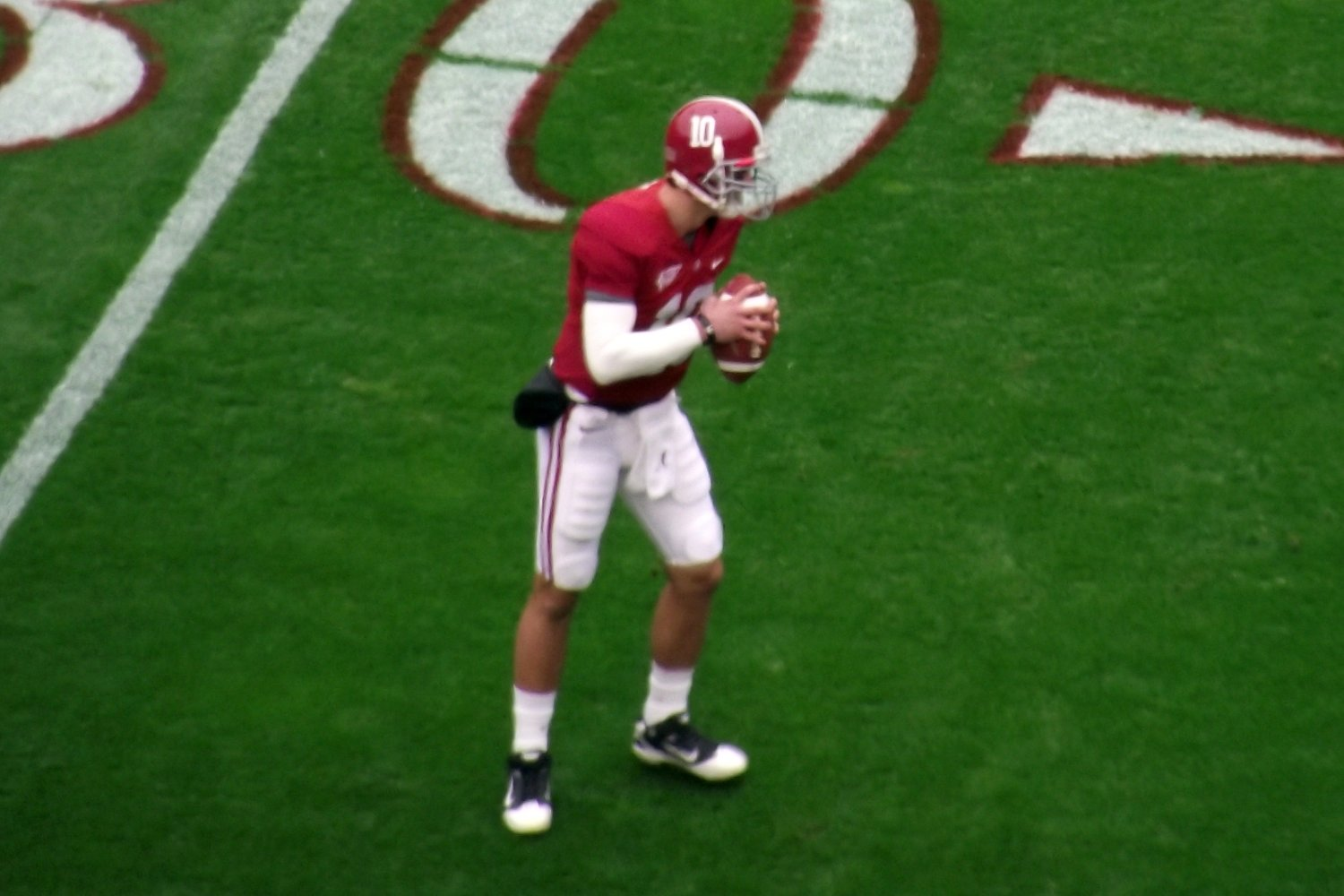
A.J. McCarron (pictured) threw a 99-yard touchdown to Amari Cooper to give Alabama a 28–21 lead. The play was the longest in Alabama program history.

Alabama's drive came to a halt following two incomplete passes and a false start penalty that moved the offense back five yards, nullifying the first successful field goal attempt of the game. The Crimson Tide then missed their second field goal of the game. Later in the quarter another Auburn punt was downed at the Alabama 1-yard line. McCarron then threw a 99-yard touchdown pass to Cooper, giving Alabama a 28–21 lead with 10:28 remaining in the game. It was the longest pass play in Crimson Tide football history. On the next drive Auburn faced a 4th and 1 on their own 35-yard line. Marshall kept the ball on a read option play but failed to gain the yard needed, and Auburn turned the ball over on downs. Alabama started the ensuing drive with excellent field position, and was soon faced with a 4th and 1 on the Auburn 13-yard line. Rather than attempting a short field goal, Nick Saban elected to try and go for a touchdown on 4th down, likely due to the two missed field goals by Cade Foster earlier in the game. On the 4th-down try, Yeldon was stopped at the line of scrimmage by true freshman defensive end Carl Lawson and Alabama, like Auburn on the previous drive, turned the ball over on downs. Auburn started the next drive deep in their own territory, and following a sack, were faced with a 3rd and 19. On 3rd down, Ricardo Louis broke free downfield, but Marshall's pass was slightly overthrown, falling incomplete off of Louis's fingertips, forcing the Tigers to punt. Following a 25-yard punt return by Christion Jones, Alabama once again started a drive deep in Auburn territory with a chance to take a two-possession lead, this time at the 25-yard line. Alabama went three-and-out before Foster had his 44-yard field goal blocked, his third missed field goal of the game. Auburn got the ball off the blocked field goal trailing 28-21 with 2:41 left in the game, and drove to the Alabama 39-yard line in six plays.

==== Final 40 seconds ====
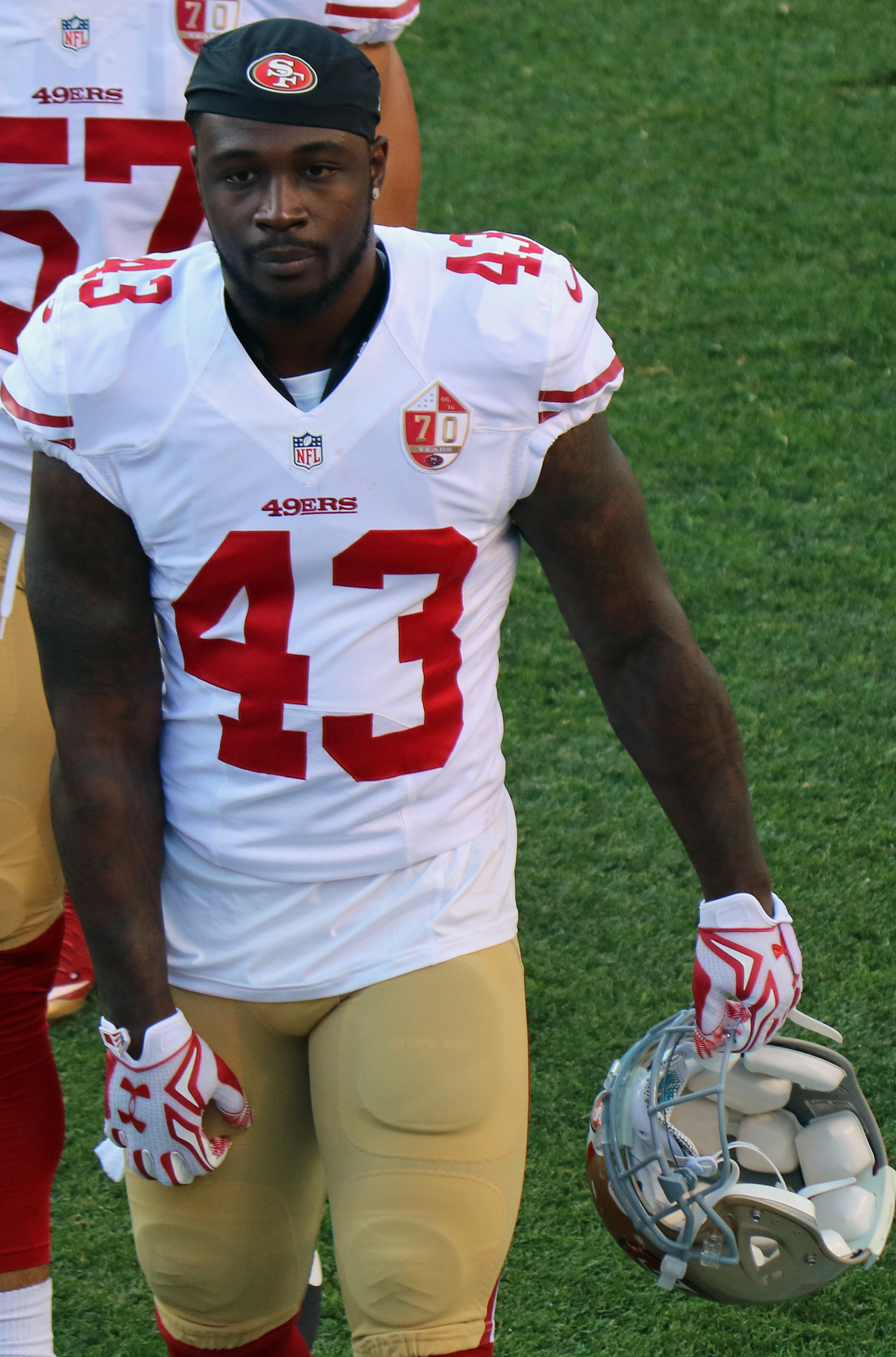
On the game's final play, Auburn's Chris Davis (pictured in 2016) returned a missed field goal for a touchdown to give Auburn a 34–28 victory.

With 40 seconds remaining, Nick Marshall scrambled to his left. As he was nearing the line of scrimmage, Alabama corner Ha Ha Clinton-Dix ran toward Marshall to attempt a tackle, leaving receiver Sammie Coates open; Marshall quickly tossed the ball to Coates just before crossing the line of scrimmage for a game-tying 39-yard touchdown. On the ensuing possession, with seven seconds left in the game, Alabama ran to Auburn's 38-yard line as T. J. Yeldon was knocked out of bounds by defensive back Chris Davis while the game clock expired. Saban argued to the referees that Yeldon had stepped out of bounds with one second left in regulation. Saban's argument was validated by the instant replay officials, who put one second back on the clock. Rather than take a knee and go to overtime, Alabama attempted to win the game with a 57-yard field goal, this time with freshman Adam Griffith taking the kick instead of the struggling Foster. Before the kick, Auburn took a timeout in an attempt to ice the kicker. Auburn's defensive coordinator, Ellis Johnson, doubted Alabama would make the long field goal and suggested that a speedy player stand in the end zone with the potential to return a missed field goal. Malzahn then put Chris Davis, who doubled as Auburn's punt returner, in the end zone for the return in the event of a miss. As the field goal attempt fell short, Davis fielded the ball nine yards deep in the end zone and ran down the left sideline. Due to Alabama's field goal unit being made up mostly of heavy offensive linemen, and strong blocking by Auburn, Davis ran untouched all the way to the opposite end zone as time expired to win the game 34–28, causing Auburn fans to storm the field in celebration.

The crowd reaction during the game's final play registered on seismographs across the state of Alabama, in a manner similar to activity registered during the 1988 Auburn–LSU "Earthquake Game".

== Scoring summary ==
Scoring summary

Quarter	Time	Drive			Team	Scoring information	Score	
Quarter	Time	Plays	Yards	TOP	Team	Scoring information	Alabama	Auburn
1	5:05	7	66	3:26	Auburn	Nick Marshall 45-yard touchdown run, Cody Parkey kick good	0	7
2	11:00	11	67	4:33	Alabama	Jalston Fowler 3-yard touchdown reception from A. J. McCarron, Cade Foster kick good	7	7
2	7:12	4	36	1:57	Alabama	Kevin Norwood 20-yard touchdown reception from A. J. McCarron, Cade Foster kick good	14	7
2	3:48	5	56	1:41	Alabama	T. J. Yeldon 1-yard touchdown run, Cade Foster kick good	21	7
2	1:40	7	81	2:08	Auburn	Tre Mason 1-yard touchdown run, Cody Parkey kick good	21	14
3	11:56	9	69	3:04	Auburn	C. J. Uzomah 13-yard touchdown reception from Nick Marshall, Cody Parkey kick good	21	21
4	10:28	1	99	0:14	Alabama	Amari Cooper 99-yard touchdown reception from A. J. McCarron, Cade Foster kick good	28	21
4	0:32	7	65	2:00	Auburn	Sammie Coates 39-yard touchdown reception from Nick Marshall, Cody Parkey kick good	28	28
4	0:00	–	–	–	Auburn	Chris Davis 109-yard kick return for a touchdown	28	34
"TOP" = time of possession. For other American football terms, see Glossary of American football.							28	34

== Broadcaster calls ==
Commentators Verne Lundquist and Gary Danielson called the game on television nationally for CBS's SEC coverage. Lundquist's call of the last play:

On the way... no, returned by Chris Davis. Davis goes left, Davis gets a block, Davis has another block! Chris Davis! No flags! Touchdown, Auburn! An answered prayer!

Gary Danielson later compared the game to the legendary Miracle on Ice, equating Auburn's upset of Alabama to the amateur USA hockey team defeating the powerhouse Soviet Union team during the 1980 Winter Olympics. In a 2020 interview, Lundquist called the play the greatest sporting moment he ever witnessed.

Commentators Rod Bramblett and Stan White called the game on radio for the Auburn IMG Sports Network. Bramblett's call of the last play:

All right, here we go. 56-yarder, it's got—no, does not have the leg... and Chris Davis takes it in the back of the end zone. He'll run it out to the 10, 15, 20, 25, 30, 35, 40, 45, 50, 45! There goes Davis! (Oh, my God!) Davis is gonna run it all the way back! Auburn's gonna win the football game! Auburn's gonna win the football game! He ran the missed field goal back! He ran it back 109 yards! They're not gonna keep 'em off the field tonight! Holy cow! Oh, my God! Auburn wins! Auburn has won the Iron Bowl! Auburn has won the Iron Bowl in the most unbelievable fashion you will ever see! I cannot believe it! 34–28! And we thought "A Miracle in Jordan-Hare" was amazing! Oh, my Lord in Heaven! Chris Davis just ran it 109 yards, and Auburn is going to the championship game!

Bramblett's passionate call of the final play quickly went viral, garnering him national media attention and resulted in Bramblett being named the Sports Broadcaster of the Year by Sports Illustrated. The call has since been assessed as one of the greatest announcer calls in recent sports history, being described by The New York Times as "the Call of a Lifetime".

== Statistics ==
Team statistical comparison
Statistic	Alabama	Auburn
First downs	19	22
Third down efficiency	4–13	8–15
Fourth down efficiency	1–2	0–1
Total yards	495	393
Rushing attempts–net yards	35–218	52–296
Yards per rush	5.2	5.7
Yards passing	277	97
Pass completions–attempts	17–29	11–16
Interceptions thrown	0	0
Fumbles–lost	0–0	1–1
Penalties–yards	6–45	3–21
Time of possession	30:40	28:40

Alabama statistics
Crimson Tide passing
	C–A	Yds	TD–INT
A.J. McCarron	17–29	277	3–0
Crimson Tide rushing
	Car	Yds	TD
T.J. Yeldon	26	141	1
Kenyan Drake	4	33	0
Amari Cooper	1	28	0
A.J. McCarron	4	16	0
Crimson Tide receiving
	Rec	Yds	TD
Amari Cooper	6	178	1
Kevin Norwood	3	45	1
O.J. Howard	2	23	0
DeAndrew White	2	13	0
T.J. Yeldon	2	8	0
Jalston Fowler	1	3	0

Auburn statistics
Tigers passing
	C–A	Yds	TD–INT
Nick Marshall	11–16	97	2–0
Tigers rushing
	Car	Yds	TD
Tre Mason	29	164	1
Nick Marshall	17	99	1
Corey Grant	4	28	0
Cameron Artis-Payne	2	5	0
Tigers receiving
	Rec	Yds	TD
Sammie Coates	2	60	1
C.J. Uzomah	2	22	1
Quan Bray	3	14	0
Cameron Artis-Payne	1	4	0
Ricardo Louis	2	−1	0
Corey Grant	1	−2	0

== Aftermath ==
Auburn's win not only ended Alabama's bid for a third straight national title, but moved Auburn to third in the BCS standings. The Tigers beat Missouri 59–42 in the SEC Championship Game. After #2 Ohio State's loss to Michigan State in the Big Ten Championship Game, Auburn moved into second place in the BCS and secured a place in the BCS National Championship Game, where they ultimately lost to the Florida State Seminoles 34–31. Auburn's loss to Florida State ended the SEC's streak of seven consecutive national championship victories. At the conclusion of the season, Auburn's Gus Malzahn won the SEC Coach of the Year award and received a six-year contract extension worth $3.85m per year. Alabama's A.J. McCarron and Auburn's Tre Mason were 2013 Heisman Trophy finalists with McCarron finishing 2nd and Mason finishing 6th.

Immediately following the game, some sportswriters began describing the game as among the greatest in college football history, with Davis's return being described as one of the sport's greatest moments. Pat Forde, then a columnist for Yahoo! Sports, stated that:

It was, quite simply, the most astounding ending ever to a college football game. I was at the Boise State–Oklahoma Fiesta Bowl in 2007; this tops it. More at stake, and even more shock value on the final play (minus the player proposing to his girlfriend on the field).

An article in USA Today described the back-to-back victories with the analogy that lightning struck twice, with the Georgia game being "one of the greatest finishes to a college football game" and the Alabama upset "perhaps the greatest play in college football history". The Birmingham News called the Auburn victory their "latest miracle finish ... even more stunning than the first" while the News & Record described the game as "possibly the greatest college football game ever played." In 2015, college football fans voted the final play the greatest in college football history. At the 2014 ESPY Awards, which recognized the greatest achievements sporting achievements in 2013, the game won the award for Best Game. The game-winning touchdown return was also named Best Play at the ESPYs, beating out three other nominees including Auburn's Prayer at Jordan-Hare against Georgia.

=== Naming the game ===
After the game, the press identified Alabama's Achilles' heel: the kicking game. In reference to their four unsuccessful field goal attempts, writers called the game "Kick Bama Kick", in reference to the 1972 Iron Bowl, nicknamed "Punt Bama Punt". At 6:43 p.m., just 18 minutes after of the conclusion of the game, Jon Solomon of The Birmingham News posted an article titled "Kick Bama Kick", but included an online poll allowing readers to select their favorite moniker. Among seven proposed titles, "Kick Bama Kick" won by a landslide. Ryan Black of the Ledger–Enquirer in Columbus, Georgia titled an article "Kick, Bama, kick" within hours of the game's completion. Frank Cooney of Yahoo! Sports, who noted that the game will be "forever secured" in the discussion for the most dramatic college football game in history, also titled his piece "Kick Bama Kick" that evening. In the years following the game, the "Kick Six" has emerged as the most enduring name for the game, used by most media outlets, Auburn, and the NCAA to refer to both the play and the game.

The term "Kick Six" has since been used to refer to other instances of blocked or missed field goals being returned for a touchdown, as in an NFL game on November 30, 2015, by the Baltimore Ravens against the Cleveland Browns. The term is a play on the term "pick six", which refers to an interception being returned for a touchdown.
