= 2014 Gator Bowl =

2014 TaxSlayer.com Gator Bowl
- 69th Gator Bowl
Nebraska Cornhuskers	Georgia Bulldogs
(8–4)	(8–4)
Big Ten	SEC
24	19
Head coach: Bo Pelini	Head coach: Mark Richt
	AP / Coaches / BCS; 23 / 24 / 22
	1	2	3	4	Total
Nebraska	0	10	14	0	24
Georgia	0	9	3	7	19
- Date: January 1, 2014
- Season: 2013
- Stadium: Jacksonville Municipal Stadium
- Location: Jacksonville, Florida
- MVP: Quincy Enunwa (Nebraska WR)
- Favorite: Georgia by 9
- Referee: Mike Batlan (Pac-12)
- Attendance: 60,712

United States TV coverage
- Network: ESPN2
- Announcers: Mike Patrick (play-by-play); Ed Cunningham (analyst); Jeannine Edwards (sideline)

The 2014 Gator Bowl, known as the TaxSlayer.com Gator Bowl for sponsorship purposes, was the sixty-ninth edition of the college football bowl game, played on January 1, 2014 at Jacksonville Municipal Stadium in Jacksonville, Florida. Part of the 2013–14 bowl season, it featured the Nebraska Cornhuskers of the Big Ten and the Georgia Bulldogs of the SEC. The game began at noon EST and aired on ESPN2.

Nebraska, an underdog by nearly ten points, used timely red-zone defense and a 99-yard Quincy Enunwa touchdown to hold on for a 24–19 victory.

== Teams ==
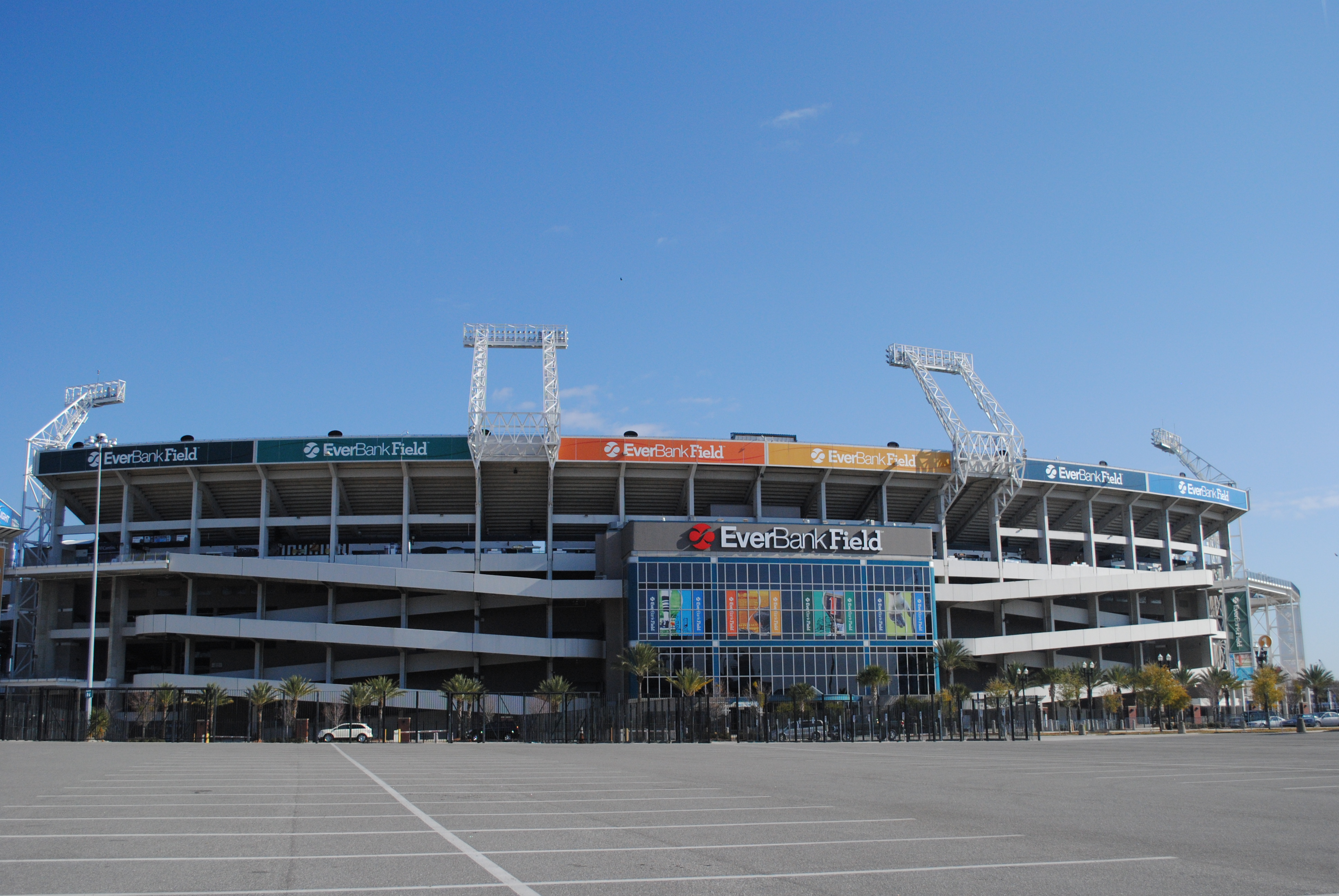
The 2014 Gator Bowl was played at Jacksonville Municipal Stadium

The 2014 Gator Bowl was the third all-time meeting between Georgia and Nebraska, with the series tied 1–1 prior to the game, including a 45–31 Bulldogs win in the 2013 Citrus Bowl.

=== Nebraska ===
Nebraska entered 8–4 and 5–3 in the Big Ten. The Cornhuskers began the season ranked eighteenth in the AP poll, but dropped out after a loss to UCLA in September. Nebraska played most of the season without senior quarterback Taylor Martinez, and went 3–3 across the second half to finish third in the Legends Division. Speculation head coach Bo Pelini would be fired after a season-ending loss to Iowa was rebuffed by administration.

Nebraska appeared in the Gator Bowl once prior to 2014, a victory over Clemson in 2009. The 2014 Gator Bowl marked Nebraska's fiftieth bowl appearance.

=== Georgia ===
Georgia entered 8–4 and 5–3 in the SEC. The Bulldogs began the season ranked fifth in the AP poll as the media's pick to win the SEC East. UGA lost its season opener to Clemson, but followed with victories over a pair of top-ten opponents to enter October ranked sixth nationally. The injury-ridden Bulldogs went just 4–3 over the rest of the season, including a last-second loss to Auburn termed the "Prayer at Jordan-Hare," to finish third in the East. Quarterback Aaron Murray suffered a season-ending injury in late November, ending his streak of 52 consecutive starts.

Georgia was making its fourth appearance in the Gator Bowl and its first since a victory over Michigan State in 1989.

== Game summary ==
=== First half ===
Each of the game's first five drives ended in punts. Georgia drove to Nebraska's ten-yard line early in the second quarter, settling for a 39-yard Marshall Morgan field goal to open the scoring. The Bulldogs forced a quick three-and-out, but a muffed punt gave Nebraska possession deep inside Georgia territory. NU quickly capitalized, taking a 7–3 lead on a five-yard touchdown pass from Tommy Armstrong to Quincy Enunwa. The half's final three drives led to field goals, giving NU a 10–9 lead at the break.

=== Second half ===
Georgia's opening drive of the second half ended when Hutson Mason, UGA's starter in place of Murray, was intercepted by Josh Mitchell near midfield, allowing Nebraska to stretch the lead to 17–9. A fourth Georgia drive stalled in NU territory and another Morgan field goal closed the gap to 17–12. Nebraska started the ensuing drive at its own five-yard line after a holding penalty on the kickoff, and a sack pushed the Cornhuskers back to the one. Facing a long third down, Armstrong connected with Enunwa on a 99-yard touchdown, the longest pass play in bowl history, to take a 24–12 lead with 4:58 remaining in the third quarter. Nebraska forced a quick punt on Georgia's ensuing possession, but Armstrong was intercepted by Shaq Wiggins on NU's side of the field.

Mason opened the fourth quarter with a 25-yard touchdown pass to Todd Gurley to cut the deficit to five. Georgia's defense forced a punt on Nebraska's next two drives, giving its offense a chance to take the lead for the first time since it was 3–0. Starting at their own twenty-yard line with 7:31 remaining, the Bulldogs drove deep into Nebraska territory, but were turned back when Rantavious Wooten dropped a fourth-down pass. After forcing a punt, Georgia reached Nebraska's sixteen-yard line with 31 seconds remaining, but another dropped pass on fourth down allowed NU to run out the clock on a 24–19 victory.

Enunwa was named most valuable player after finishing with two touchdowns and 129 receiving yards, including his record-setting score in the third quarter. Georgia outgained Nebraska by over 100 yards, but converted just one of seven trips inside NU's 21-yard line into a touchdown.

=== Scoring summary ===
Qtr	Time	Drive			Team	Detail	Score	
Qtr	Time	Plays	Yards	TOP	Team	Detail	NU	UGA
2	10:37	12	38	5:05	UGA	Marshall Morgan 38-yd field goal	0	3
2	9:05	2	14	0:32	NU	Quincy Enunwa 5-yd pass from Tommy Armstrong (Pat Smith kick)	7	3
2	6:53	7	41	2:03	UGA	Morgan 28-yd field goal	7	6
2	3:18	9	54	3:12	NU	Smith 46-yd field goal	10	6
2	0:00	9	54	3:12	UGA	Morgan 38-yd field goal	10	9
3	10:08	7	38	3:35	NU	Ameer Abdullah 1-yd run (Smith kick)	17	9
3	6:32	10	62	3:36	UGA	Morgan 30-yd field goal	17	12
3	4:58	3	95	1:14	NU	Enunwa 99-yd pass from Armstrong (Smith kick)	24	12
4	14:49	7	39	2:14	UGA	Todd Gurley 25-yd pass from Hutson Mason (Morgan kick)	24	19

=== Individual leaders ===
Team	Category	Player	Statistics
NU	Passing	Tommy Armstrong	6/14, 163 yds, 2 TD, INT
NU	Rushing	Ameer Abdullah	27 car, 122 yds, TD
NU	Receiving	Quincy Enunwa	4 rec, 129 yds, 2 TD
UGA	Passing	Hutson Mason	21/39, 320 yds, TD, INT
UGA	Rushing	Todd Gurley	21 car, 86 yds
UGA	Receiving	Todd Gurley	7 rec, 97 yds, TD

=== Team statistics ===
Statistic	Nebraska	Georgia
First downs	14	22
Rushes-yards	43–144	43–96
Comp.–att.–yards	6–16–163	21–39–320
Total offense	307	416
Turnovers	1	2
Punts–average	7–38.7	4–37.8
Penalties–yards	6–50	7–42
Time of possession	26:36	33:24
