= Deep South's Oldest Rivalry =

College football rivalry game

- Auburn Tigers Georgia Bulldogs
- Sport: College football
- First meeting: February 20, 1892; Auburn, 10–0
- Latest meeting: October 17, 2026; Auburn, 27–24
- Next meeting: 2027

Statistics
- Total meetings: 131
- All-time series: Georgia leads, 66–57–8
- Largest victory: Auburn, 44–0 (1900)
- Longest win streak: Georgia, 9 (1923–1931; 2017–2025)
- Current win streak: Auburn, 1 (2026–present)

Locations of Auburn and Georgia

The Auburn–Georgia football rivalry is a college football rivalry game between the SEC teams Auburn Tigers and Georgia Bulldogs. The two teams first played each other in 1892, and the rivalry has been renewed annually since 1944 for a total of 131 games as of 2026. Because it is the oldest rivalry still contested between teams in the Deep South, the series is referred to by both schools as the "Deep South's Oldest Rivalry" (although the first football game played in the Deep South was Wofford vs. Furman in 1889, a matchup that still claims the same title). The series is currently the second-most played rivalry in the NCAA Division I Football Bowl Subdivision (FBS), behind Minnesota–Wisconsin (Paul Bunyan's Axe) and tied with North Carolina–Virginia (South's Oldest Rivalry).

The Deep South's Oldest Rivalry is eight months older than the South's Oldest Rivalry, with Auburn–Georgia first meeting on February 20, 1892, and North Carolina–Virginia first meeting on October 22, 1892. The Auburn–Georgia series has been played almost continuously from the beginning, with the exception of 1893 (rematch not scheduled), 1897 (Georgia disbanded its team early in the season following the fatal on-field injury of one of its players), 1917 and 1918 (Georgia did not field teams during World War I), and 1943 (Auburn did not field a team due to World War II). The Deep South's Oldest Rivalry and the South's Oldest Rivalry were tied from 1910–1942 until North Carolina–Virginia surpassed Auburn–Georgia in 1943 (though North Carolina–Virginia continued to trail Southern rivalry Texas–Texas A&M by two games). Conference realignments in the early 2010s ended several prominent rivalries, allowing North Carolina–Virginia (in 2014) and Auburn–Georgia (in 2015) to surpass Kansas–Missouri and Texas–Texas A&M, giving North Carolina–Virginia the undisputed lead as most-played rivalry in the South and tied with Cincinnati–Miami University (Battle for the Bell) for the second-most played rivalry in the FBS. They would soon be joined by Auburn–Georgia in 2017 after the SEC foes played twice in the same season – once in the regular season and again in the conference championship game. (Note: Auburn–Georgia may eventually surpass North Carolina–Virginia in games played due to the divisional pairings of their respective conferences, the SEC and ACC. Auburn and Georgia are in different SEC divisions, which could set up an SEC Championship Game match-up, the second game in the same season (as was the case in 2017). North Carolina and Virginia, on the other hand, are in the same ACC division, making an ACC Championship Game match-up impossible.) The Cincinnati–Miami University matchup was cancelled in 2020 due to the COVID-19 pandemic, leaving Auburn–Georgia and North Carolina–Virginia tied for the second-most played rivalry in FBS.

== Series history ==
The first college football game between Auburn University and the University of Georgia was played on February 20, 1892, in Piedmont Park in Atlanta, Georgia. The game was the brainchild of Charles Herty of Georgia and George Petrie of Auburn, the founders and first head coaches of their respective university's football teams. The two had met as graduate school classmates at Johns Hopkins University. The game was also, according to legend, when Auburn's team cheer, "War Eagle", originated, though this claim is disputed. Auburn won the game 10–0.

The Tigers and Bulldogs have played each other nearly every year since. There have only been three exceptions since 1898, when World War I and World War II interrupted the series. From 1904-1911, games in the series were played in Macon, Montgomery, and Savannah. From 1916 until 1958, the game was played at a neutral site, A. J. McClung Memorial Stadium in Columbus, Georgia. When the Southeastern Conference split into its Eastern Division and Western Division in 1992, with Auburn placed in the west and Georgia in the east, the game was designated as the teams' annual cross-divisional rivalry game, leaving open the possibility for the two teams to meet in the SEC Championship Game. This happened for the first time in 2017, when Georgia beat Auburn 28–7 to claim their 13th SEC championship. This championship game matchup tied the rivalry with the South's Oldest Rivalry between Virginia and North Carolina for the 2nd most played rivalry game in FBS football.

The rivalry is historically close, with the all-time series tied as recently as the 2014 season. However, since 2006, Georgia has won 18 of the last 22.

== Game results ==
| Auburn victories | Georgia victories | Tie games |

| No. | Date | Location | Winning team | | Losing team | |
|---|---|---|---|---|---|---|
| 1 | February 20, 1892 | Atlanta, GA | Auburn | 10 | Georgia | 0 |
| 2 | November 24, 1894 | Atlanta, GA | Georgia | 10 | Auburn | 8 |
| 3 | November 28, 1895 | Atlanta, GA | Auburn | 16 | Georgia | 6 |
| 4 | November 26, 1896 | Atlanta, GA | Georgia | 12 | Auburn | 6 |
| 5 | November 24, 1898 | Atlanta, GA | Auburn | 18 | Georgia | 17 |
| 6 | November 18, 1899 | Atlanta, GA | Tie | 0 | Tie | 0 |
| 7 | November 30, 1900 | Atlanta, GA | Auburn | 44 | Georgia | 0 |
| 8 | November 27, 1901 | Atlanta, GA | Tie | 0 | Tie | 0 |
| 9 | November 27, 1902 | Atlanta, GA | Georgia | 12 | Auburn | 5 |
| 10 | November 26, 1903 | Atlanta, GA | Georgia | 22 | Auburn | 13 |
| 11 | November 24, 1904 | Macon, GA | Auburn | 17 | Georgia | 6 |
| 12 | November 30, 1905 | Macon, GA | Auburn | 20 | Georgia | 0 |
| 13 | November 29, 1906 | Macon, GA | Georgia | 4 | Auburn | 0 |
| 14 | November 30, 1907 | Macon, GA | Georgia | 6 | Auburn | 0 |
| 15 | November 27, 1908 | Montgomery, AL | Auburn | 23 | Georgia | 0 |
| 16 | November 25, 1909 | Montgomery, AL | Auburn | 17 | Georgia | 5 |
| 17 | November 24, 1910 | Savannah, GA | Auburn | 26 | Georgia | 0 |
| 18 | November 29, 1911 | Savannah, GA | Tie | 0 | Tie | 0 |
| 19 | November 28, 1912 | Athens, GA | Georgia | 12 | Auburn | 6 |
| 20 | November 22, 1913 | Atlanta, GA | Auburn | 21 | Georgia | 7 |
| 21 | November 21, 1914 | Atlanta, GA | Tie | 0 | Tie | 0 |
| 22 | October 30, 1915 | Atlanta, GA | Auburn | 12 | Georgia | 0 |
| 23 | November 4, 1916 | Columbus, GA | Auburn | 3 | Georgia | 0 |
| 24 | November 1, 1919 | Columbus, GA | Auburn | 7 | Georgia | 0 |
| 25 | October 30, 1920 | Columbus, GA | Georgia | 7 | Auburn | 0 |
| 26 | October 29, 1921 | Columbus, GA | Georgia | 7 | Auburn | 0 |
| 27 | November 4, 1922 | Columbus, GA | Auburn | 7 | Georgia | 3 |
| 28 | November 3, 1923 | Columbus, GA | Georgia | 7 | Auburn | 0 |
| 29 | November 15, 1924 | Columbus, GA | Georgia | 6 | Auburn | 0 |
| 30 | November 7, 1925 | Columbus, GA | Georgia | 34 | Auburn | 0 |
| 31 | November 6, 1926 | Columbus, GA | Georgia | 16 | Auburn | 0 |
| 32 | October 22, 1927 | Columbus, GA | Georgia | 33 | Auburn | 3 |
| 33 | November 3, 1928 | Columbus, GA | Georgia | 13 | Auburn | 0 |
| 34 | November 15, 1929 | Athens, GA | Georgia | 24 | Auburn | 0 |
| 35 | November 25, 1930 | Columbus, GA | Georgia | 39 | Auburn | 7 |
| 36 | November 21, 1931 | Columbus, GA | Georgia | 12 | Auburn | 6 |
| 37 | November 19, 1932 | Columbus, GA | Auburn | 14 | Georgia | 7 |
| 38 | November 18, 1933 | Columbus, GA | Auburn | 14 | Georgia | 6 |
| 39 | November 24, 1934 | Columbus, GA | Georgia | 18 | Auburn | 0 |
| 40 | November 23, 1935 | Columbus, GA | Auburn | 19 | Georgia | 7 |
| 41 | October 24, 1936 | Columbus, GA | Auburn | 20 | Georgia | 13 |
| 42 | November 20, 1937 | Columbus, GA | Tie | 0 | Tie | 0 |
| 43 | November 19, 1938 | Columbus, GA | Auburn | 23 | Georgia | 14 |
| 44 | November 25, 1939 | Columbus, GA | Auburn | 7 | Georgia | 0 |
| 45 | November 2, 1940 | Columbus, GA | Georgia | 14 | Auburn | 13 |
| 46 | November 1, 1941 | Columbus, GA | Georgia | 7 | Auburn | 0 |
| 47 | November 21, 1942 | Columbus, GA | Auburn | 27 | No. 1 Georgia | 13 |
| 48 | November 18, 1944 | Columbus, GA | Georgia | 49 | Auburn | 13 |
| 49 | November 17, 1945 | Columbus, GA | Georgia | 35 | Auburn | 0 |
| 50 | November 16, 1946 | Columbus, GA | No. 3 Georgia | 41 | Auburn | 0 |
| 51 | November 15, 1947 | Columbus, GA | Georgia | 28 | Auburn | 6 |
| 52 | November 13, 1948 | Columbus, GA | No. 13 Georgia | 42 | Auburn | 14 |
| 53 | November 12, 1949 | Columbus, GA | Tie | 20 | Tie | 20 |
| 54 | November 18, 1950 | Columbus, GA | Georgia | 12 | Auburn | 10 |
| 55 | November 17, 1951 | Columbus, GA | Georgia | 46 | Auburn | 14 |
| 56 | November 15, 1952 | Columbus, GA | Georgia | 13 | Auburn | 7 |
| 57 | November 14, 1953 | Columbus, GA | No. 20 Auburn | 39 | Georgia | 18 |
| 58 | November 13, 1954 | Columbus, GA | Auburn | 35 | No. 20 Georgia | 0 |
| 59 | November 12, 1955 | Columbus, GA | No. 12 Auburn | 16 | Georgia | 13 |
| 60 | November 17, 1956 | Columbus, GA | Auburn | 20 | Georgia | 0 |
| 61 | November 16, 1957 | Columbus, GA | No. 3 Auburn | 6 | Georgia | 0 |
| 62 | November 15, 1958 | Columbus, GA | No. 4 Auburn | 21 | Georgia | 6 |
| 63 | November 14, 1959 | Athens, GA | No. 12 Georgia | 14 | No. 8 Auburn | 13 |
| 64 | November 12, 1960 | Auburn, AL | No. 10 Auburn | 9 | Georgia | 6 |
| 65 | November 18, 1961 | Athens, GA | Auburn | 10 | Georgia | 7 |
| 66 | November 17, 1962 | Auburn, AL | Georgia | 30 | Auburn | 21 |

| No. | Date | Location | Winning team | | Losing team | |
|---|---|---|---|---|---|---|
| 67 | November 16, 1963 | Athens, GA | No. 9 Auburn | 14 | Georgia | 0 |
| 68 | November 14, 1964 | Auburn, AL | Auburn | 14 | Georgia | 7 |
| 69 | November 13, 1965 | Athens, GA | Auburn | 21 | Georgia | 19 |
| 70 | November 12, 1966 | Auburn, AL | No. 9 Georgia | 21 | Auburn | 13 |
| 71 | November 18, 1967 | Athens, GA | Georgia | 17 | Auburn | 0 |
| 72 | November 16, 1968 | Auburn, AL | No. 5 Georgia | 17 | No. 12 Auburn | 3 |
| 73 | November 15, 1969 | Athens, GA | No. 11 Auburn | 16 | No. 16 Georgia | 3 |
| 74 | November 14, 1970 | Auburn, AL | Georgia | 31 | No. 8 Auburn | 17 |
| 75 | November 13, 1971 | Athens, GA | No. 6 Auburn | 35 | No. 7 Georgia | 20 |
| 76 | November 18, 1972 | Auburn, AL | No. 11 Auburn | 27 | Georgia | 10 |
| 77 | November 17, 1973 | Athens, GA | Georgia | 28 | Auburn | 14 |
| 78 | November 16, 1974 | Auburn, AL | No. 7 Auburn | 17 | Georgia | 13 |
| 79 | November 15, 1975 | Athens, GA | No. 20 Georgia | 28 | Auburn | 13 |
| 80 | November 13, 1976 | Auburn, AL | No. 7 Georgia | 28 | Auburn | 0 |
| 81 | November 12, 1977 | Athens, GA | Auburn | 33 | Georgia | 14 |
| 82 | November 18, 1978 | Auburn, AL | Tie | 22 | Tie | 22 |
| 83 | November 17, 1979 | Athens, GA | No. 15 Auburn | 33 | Georgia | 13 |
| 84 | November 15, 1980 | Auburn, AL | No. 1 Georgia | 31 | Auburn | 21 |
| 85 | November 14, 1981 | Athens, GA | No. 4 Georgia | 24 | Auburn | 13 |
| 86 | November 13, 1982 | Auburn, AL | No. 1 Georgia | 19 | Auburn | 14 |
| 87 | November 12, 1983 | Athens, GA | No. 3 Auburn | 13 | No. 4 Georgia | 7 |
| 88 | November 17, 1984 | Auburn, AL | No. 18 Auburn | 21 | No. 15 Georgia | 12 |
| 89 | November 13, 1985 | Athens, GA | No. 14 Auburn | 24 | No. 12 Georgia | 10 |
| 90 | November 15, 1986 | Auburn, AL | Georgia | 20 | No. 8 Auburn | 16 |
| 91 | November 13, 1987 | Athens, GA | No. 12 Auburn | 27 | No. 8 Georgia | 11 |
| 92 | November 12, 1988 | Auburn, AL | No. 9 Auburn | 20 | No. 17 Georgia | 10 |
| 93 | November 18, 1989 | Athens, GA | No. 11 Auburn | 20 | Georgia | 3 |
| 94 | November 17, 1990 | Auburn, AL | No. 24 Auburn | 33 | Georgia | 10 |
| 95 | November 18, 1991 | Athens, GA | Georgia | 37 | Auburn | 27 |
| 96 | November 14, 1992 | Auburn, AL | No. 12 Georgia | 14 | Auburn | 10 |
| 97 | November 13, 1993 | Athens, GA | No. 7 Auburn | 42 | Georgia | 28 |
| 98 | November 12, 1994 | Auburn, AL | Tie | 23 | Tie | 23 |
| 99 | November 11, 1995 | Athens, GA | No. 20 Auburn | 37 | Georgia | 31 |
| 100 | November 16, 1996 | Auburn, AL | Georgia | 56 | No. 20 Auburn | 49^{4OT} |
| 101 | November 15, 1997 | Athens, GA | No. 16 Auburn | 45 | No. 7 Georgia | 34 |
| 102 | November 14, 1998 | Auburn, AL | No. 17 Georgia | 28 | Auburn | 17 |
| 103 | November 13, 1999 | Athens, GA | Auburn | 38 | No. 14 Georgia | 21 |
| 104 | November 11, 2000 | Auburn, AL | No. 22 Auburn | 29 | No. 14 Georgia | 26 |
| 105 | November 10, 2001 | Athens, GA | No. 24 Auburn | 24 | No. 19 Georgia | 17 |
| 106 | November 16, 2002 | Auburn, AL | No. 7 Georgia | 24 | No. 24 Auburn | 21 |
| 107 | November 15, 2003 | Athens, GA | No. 7 Georgia | 26 | Auburn | 7 |
| 108 | November 13, 2004 | Auburn, AL | No. 3 Auburn | 24 | No. 8 Georgia | 6 |
| 109 | November 12, 2005 | Athens, GA | No. 15 Auburn | 31 | No. 9 Georgia | 30 |
| 110 | November 11, 2006 | Auburn, AL | Georgia | 37 | No. 5 Auburn | 15 |
| 111 | November 10, 2007 | Athens, GA | No. 10 Georgia | 45 | No. 18 Auburn | 20 |
| 112 | November 15, 2008 | Auburn, AL | No. 13 Georgia | 17 | Auburn | 13 |
| 113 | November 14, 2009 | Athens, GA | Georgia | 31 | Auburn | 24 |
| 114 | November 13, 2010 | Auburn, AL | No. 2 Auburn | 49 | Georgia | 31 |
| 115 | November 12, 2011 | Athens, GA | No. 14 Georgia | 45 | No. 24 Auburn | 7 |
| 116 | November 10, 2012 | Auburn, AL | No. 5 Georgia | 38 | Auburn | 0 |
| 117 | November 16, 2013 | Auburn, AL | No. 7 Auburn | 43 | No. 25 Georgia | 38 |
| 118 | November 15, 2014 | Athens, GA | No. 16 Georgia | 34 | No. 9 Auburn | 7 |
| 119 | November 14, 2015 | Auburn, AL | Georgia | 20 | Auburn | 13 |
| 120 | November 12, 2016 | Athens, GA | Georgia | 13 | No. 8 Auburn | 7 |
| 121 | November 11, 2017 | Auburn, AL | No. 10 Auburn | 40 | No. 1 Georgia | 17 |
| 122 | December 2, 2017 | Atlanta, GA^{A} | No. 6 Georgia | 28 | No. 2 Auburn | 7 |
| 123 | November 10, 2018 | Athens, GA | No. 5 Georgia | 27 | No. 24 Auburn | 10 |
| 124 | November 16, 2019 | Auburn, AL | No. 4 Georgia | 21 | No. 12 Auburn | 14 |
| 125 | October 3, 2020 | Athens, GA | No. 4 Georgia | 27 | No. 7 Auburn | 6 |
| 126 | October 9, 2021 | Auburn, AL | No. 2 Georgia | 34 | No. 18 Auburn | 10 |
| 127 | October 8, 2022 | Athens, GA | No. 2 Georgia | 42 | Auburn | 10 |
| 128 | September 30, 2023 | Auburn, AL | No. 1 Georgia | 27 | Auburn | 20 |
| 129 | October 5, 2024 | Athens, GA | No. 5 Georgia | 31 | Auburn | 13 |
| 130 | October 11, 2025 | Auburn, AL | No. 10 Georgia | 20 | Auburn | 10 |
| 131 | October 17, 2026 | Athens, GA | Auburn | 27 | No. 1 Georgia | 24 |
Series: Georgia leads 66–57–8

=== Results by location ===
As of October 17, 2026

| State | City | Games | Auburn victories | Georgia victories | Ties | Years played |
|---|---|---|---|---|---|---|
| Alabama | Auburn | 34 | 12 | 20 | 2 | 1960–present |
| Alabama | Montgomery | 2 | 2 | 0 | 0 | 1908–09 |
| Georgia | Columbus | 39 | 16 | 21 | 2 | 1916–58 |
| Georgia | Athens | 36 | 18 | 18 | 0 | 1912, 1929, 1959–present |
| Georgia | Atlanta | 14 | 6 | 5 | 3 | 1892–1903, 1913–15, 2017 |
| Georgia | Macon | 4 | 2 | 2 | 0 | 1904–07 |
| Georgia | Savannah | 2 | 1 | 0 | 1 | 1910–11 |

== Notable games ==
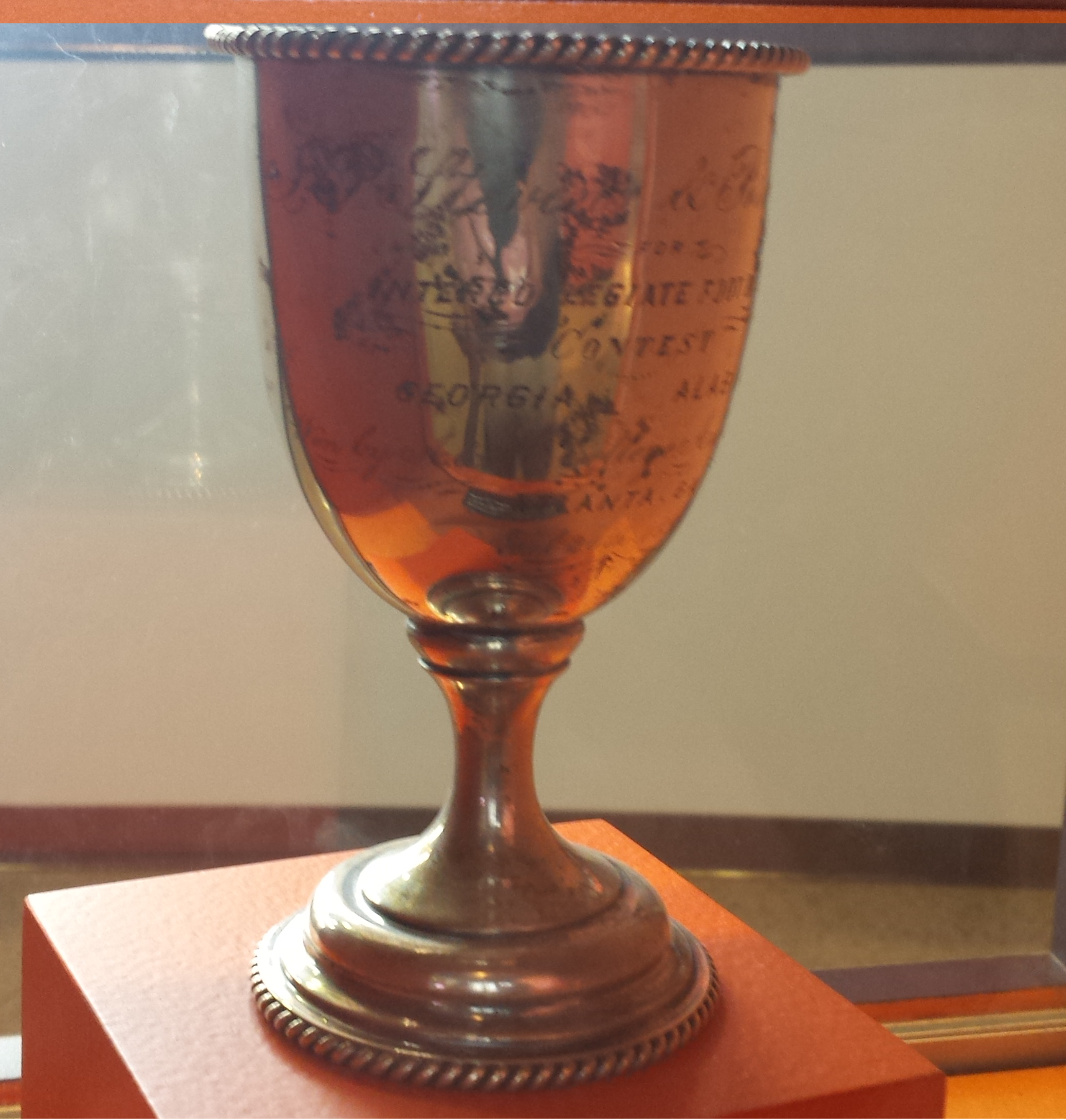
1892 Trophy

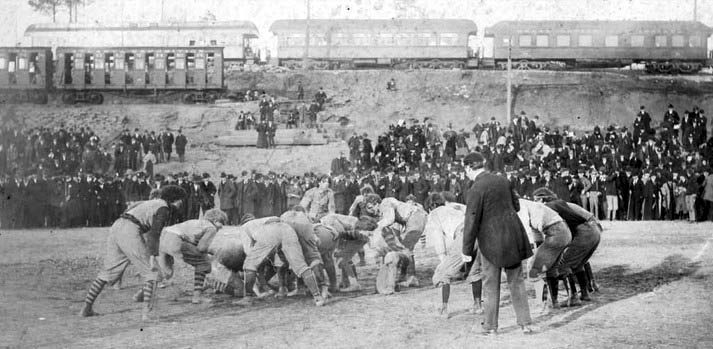
1895 Auburn-Georgia game at Piedmont Park.

=== 1892: First meeting ===
The two schools met in the first meeting in what is now the Deep South’s oldest college football rivalry. Auburn won the game 10–0. One Atlanta newspaper called it the “social event of the year.”

=== 1896: Georgia's first undefeated season ===
Georgia won by a 12–6 score to finish its first undefeated season under Pop Warner. For Auburn, the game featured Reynolds Tichenor's brilliant punt returns.

=== 1899: Game called due to darkness ===
All accounts Auburn was leading Georgia by a score of 11-6 when the game was called due to darkness, lighting not being available at that time, resulting in an official 0-0 tie. As noted by sideline reporters for The Atlanta Constitution "The conditions that appeared to make the ruling of Referee Rowbotham a necessity were such as should never have occurred on any gridiron that has the advantage of police protection. As darkness came on it was impossible in the bleachers and grand stand to distinguish the play and with no obstacle in the way the crowd surged into the field mingled with the players and made further progress a matter of impossibility." Fifteen minutes prior to the decision, Auburn coach, John Heisman, and Georgia Coach, Gordon Saussy, made an official request to call the game for the same reason. The decision was backed by Umpire Taylor. "In the decision that made the game a tie the referee was backed up by Umpire Taylor of Birmingham who, although a Just official has always been regarded by many as a friend of Auburn."

=== 1902: Nalley's final gift ===
Bulldogs letterman Rufus Nalley died in Atlanta after a short, serious illness. According to some, the last thing that he heard before losing consciousness on November 27 was that Georgia had beaten Auburn earlier that day, news that caused him to smile. It was the first victory for Georgia in the rivalry since the 1896 game in which Nalley had played.

=== 1916: Auburn FG off of helmet ===
Auburn won 3–0 in the mud on a 40-yard field goal in the fourth quarter by Moon Ducote kicked off of teammate Legare Hairston's leather helmet, in Columbus's McClung Stadium. This precipitated the rule which states the ball must be kicked directly off the ground.

=== 1920: Georgia upset ===
Georgia upset Auburn 7–0 when Auburn was fresh off a 56–6 beatdown of Vanderbilt.

=== 1942: Auburn gives UGA only loss ===
Georgia won the national championship with an 11–1 record, beating UCLA in the 1943 Rose Bowl, Georgia's lone loss came to Auburn, falling 27–13 at Columbus's Memorial Stadium.

=== 1959: Tarkenton's pass ===
On November 14, at Sanford Stadium in Athens, as time ran short, Georgia player and future Auburn head-coach Pat Dye recovered a fumble by Auburn quarterback Bryant Harvard. Georgia quarterback Fran Tarkenton's touchdown pass in the final seconds gave Georgia a 14–13 victory and cost Auburn a Southeastern Conference championship. Georgia went on to claim the 1959 SEC Championship and the 1960 Orange Bowl Championship with a victory over Missouri in Miami.

=== 1983: Dye's first win against alma mater UGA ===
Again at Sanford Stadium, Pat Dye celebrated his first SEC championship as Auburn's coach after the Tigers beat Georgia 13–7 on November 12. Georgia coach Vince Dooley, a former star Auburn quarterback, was there too on that day in 1959 as an assistant on Shug Jordan's staff.

=== 1986: "Between the hoses" ===
The Bulldogs visited Auburn as three-touchdown underdogs. Auburn was two wins away from the SEC Championship, with only one blemish on their record, an 18–17 setback at Florida. Georgia, deprived of starting quarterback James Jackson at the last moment due to a family funeral, staged a 20–16 upset victory. When Georgia fans stormed the field of Jordan–Hare Stadium and started tearing the turf from midfield and refused to leave, they were doused by sprinkler system and fire hoses. The hoses were quickly turned on the stands, soaking the Georgia marching band and fans listening to its traditional post-game performance. The incident received widespread attention and Auburn officially apologized.

=== 1994: Georgia "beats" Auburn 23-23 ===
Georgia ended Auburn's 20-game winning streak with a 23–23 tie at Jordan-Hare. The Sunday morning headline in nearby Columbus, Georgia read "UGA beats Auburn 23–23".

=== 1996: First SEC overtime game ===
The two teams played in the first Southeastern Conference football game to go into overtime. First-year head coach Jim Donnan's team was down 28–7 at halftime, before rallying to tie it at 28 on a 30-yard touchdown as time expired from Mike Bobo to Cory Allen, and Georgia went on to win 56–49 in four overtimes. This game was also famous for the incident in which Uga V lunged at Auburn wide receiver Robert Baker after a first-quarter touchdown.

=== 1999: Kevin Ramsey firing ===
Auburn coach Tommy Tuberville got his first signature win, as the underdog Tigers led 31–0 at halftime and cruised to a 38–21 victory. Georgia fired its defensive coordinator, Kevin Ramsey, the following week.

=== 2001: Auburn revenge for 1992 ===
No. 19 Georgia had a chance to force overtime after getting possession back at the Auburn 45-yard line with 1:10 remaining and no timeouts. The Bulldogs drove down to the goal line with 16 seconds left, but rather than spiking the ball to save time off the game clock, they inexplicably called for a handoff up the middle for no gain. Time expired before Georgia was trying to hurry up on offense, and the Bulldogs lost to the No. 24 Tigers 24–17, providing Auburn with revenge for a similar ending in Georgia's favor in 1992's "Lay Down Dawgs" game.

=== 2002: Michael Johnson breaks Auburn hearts ===
No. 7 Georgia traveled to No. 22 Auburn with a spot in the SEC Championship game and an outside chance at the national title on the line. Auburn led 14–3 at halftime, thanks to a 53-yard touchdown run from Ronnie Brown. Georgia rallied to make it 21–17 Tigers with 1:25 remaining when they faced a 4th and 15 from the Auburn 19. QB David Greene threw up a prayer, and Michael Johnson caught the pass over Auburn CB Horace Willis to come away with the improbable touchdown. Georgia defeated Auburn 24–21 to secure a spot in their first SEC Championship Game. The Bulldogs defeated Arkansas 30–3 to win their first SEC Championship since 1982. The Bulldogs finished the season 13–1 with a victory over Florida State in the Sugar Bowl, and a No. 3 final ranking. Auburn meanwhile finished with a 9-4 record and defeated Penn State in the Citrus Bowl.

=== 2004: Auburn top-10 win and undefeated season ===
No. 8 Georgia traveled to undefeated and No. 3 Auburn in 2004. The Tigers were eyeing their first SEC Championship since splitting the title in 1989 (Auburn was on probation in 1993 and ineligible for the championship), as well as a spot in the BCS National Championship Game. The Tigers won 24–6 on their way to a 13–0 season, ending with a 16–13 victory over Virginia Tech in the Sugar Bowl and a No. 2 national ranking.

=== 2006: Tra Battle's "Day On The Plains" ===
No. 5 Auburn had hopes of playing for a National Championship after knocking off eventual champion Florida, but the Bulldogs got a big performance out of free safety Tra Battle. Battle tied a Georgia record that day with three interceptions, one of which he returned 30 yards for a touchdown. UGA went on to rout the Tigers 37–15, dashing their title hopes and costing Tommy Tuberville a shot at playing for the SEC Championship Game.

=== 2007: Blackout game ===
The game marked the first time in the modern era that Georgia wore black jerseys. It also marked the first time that Georgia defeated Florida and Auburn in the same season since 1982 , and the first time that Georgia scored more than 40 points in three straight games since 1942.

=== 2013: Prayer at Jordan-Hare ===
No. 7 Auburn hosted No. 25 Georgia in Auburn. Through the first 50 minutes of the game, Auburn had scored on seven of nine possessions with 29 first downs building a 37–17 lead. In contrast, when Georgia began their first possession of the fourth quarter they had only reached the end zone once on their previous six drives. Auburn maintained that 20-point lead until 9:35 left in the game when the momentum suddenly shifted in Georgia's favor. At that moment, Aaron Murray threw a 5-yard touchdown pass to senior Rantavious Wooten to cut the deficit to 13 points. In fact Murray would lead his team to three touchdowns in the span of 7:46, the final touchdown giving Georgia their first lead of the game with 1:49 remaining. With 36 seconds remaining and faced with 4th and 18 from the Tiger 26-yard line, Auburn quarterback Nick Marshall, a former defensive back for the Bulldogs during the 2011 season, threw a Hail Mary pass, which was tipped by Georgia safety Josh Harvey-Clemons into the hands of Auburn sophomore wide receiver Ricardo Louis. In what has become known as "The Prayer at Jordan–Hare", the play resulted in a game-winning touchdown for the Tigers with 25 seconds to spare. Auburn went on to win the SEC Championship and later barely lost the BCS National Championship in the final seconds to Florida State. This was the first time an SEC team failed to win the BCS Championship game since the 2005 football season.

=== 2014: Return to Athens ===
After a three year absence (due to an SEC scheduling issue the 2012 and 2013 games were both played at Auburn), the Bulldogs avenged their loss from the year before by handily beating the Tigers 34–7 in Athens. Auburn scored first and took a 7–0 lead, but the Bulldogs came back with 34 unanswered points. Bulldogs freshman running back Nick Chubb ran the ball 19 times for 144 yards and 2 touchdowns for the Bulldogs. Georgia outgained the Tigers in total yards 412–292 and Auburn committed 3 turnovers in the defeat. The loss effectively ended the Tigers' hopes for a second straight National Championship Game appearance. However, the Bulldogs would lose running back Todd Gurley to a knee injury late in the game. It was later revealed that he had torn his ACL, ending his season and college career.

=== 2017: Two games in one year ===
The two teams met twice in a single season for the first time in history. The first matchup occurred on November 11 in Georgia's only regular season loss, where the #1 Bulldogs lost 40–17 at No. 10 Auburn. A rematch took place in the 2017 SEC Championship Game in Atlanta, where No. 6 Georgia got revenge by beating No. 2 Auburn 28–7 and winning the SEC Championship, securing a College Football Playoff spot in the process.

=== 2025: "Crumble After the Fumble" ===
Unranked Auburn hosted No. 10 Georgia in Auburn. Auburn initially took a 10–0 lead and was nearing the endzone close to halftime. On the goal line, Auburn quarterback Jackson Arnold fumbled and lost the ball on a quarterback sneak. Georgia went on to score 20 unanswered points, beating Auburn 20–10 and extending their winning streak over the Tigers to nine games. The game was noted for its controversial officiating. On October 22, 2025, Yellowhammer News reported that the SEC suspended crew chief Ken Williamson from officiating SEC games due to complaints regarding the 2025 matchup.

=== 2026: Auburn snaps 9-game losing streak in the series ===
In one of the biggest upsets in the history of the series, unranked Auburn defeated No. 1 Georgia 27–24. Georgia quarterback Gunner Stockton committed three turnovers, including a fumble at the Auburn 44 yard line with 0:58 remaining in the game and the score tied 24–24. Auburn drove 40 yards in 55 seconds to set up a 34 yard walkoff field goal by Alex McPherson. This was Auburn's first win over Georgia since 2017, and their first win in Athens since 2005.

== Family rivalry ==
Beyond the length of the rivalry, the schools' football histories are quite interconnected, with many individuals having played or coached at both schools, such as early quarterback Reynolds Tichenor.

Georgia's all-time winningest head coach and long-time athletic director, Vince Dooley, earned both his bachelor's and master's degree at Auburn while playing football and subsequently beginning his coaching career under legendary Auburn head coach Shug Jordan. Jordan himself was an assistant football coach and head basketball coach at Georgia before returning to his alma mater.

Former Auburn head coach Pat Dye was a three-year letterman and All-American offensive lineman at Georgia under head coach Wally Butts. About the rivalry, Dye has said, "It's a unique thing. It's like playing against your brother. I don't think anybody who plays in that game can ever forget it. It just doesn't matter much where it's played or what somebody's record is. It's so intense and tough, but at the same time, it's family."

Former Auburn associate head coach and defensive line coach Rodney Garner previously coached at Georgia for fifteen years (1998–2012). Garner and current Georgia offensive line coach Stacy Searels both played at Auburn under Dye. Former Georgia offensive coordinator Neil Callaway was Auburn's offensive line coach for all of Dye's 12 seasons.

Two-time former Auburn defensive coordinator Will Muschamp and offensive line coach Hugh Nall are former Georgia players. Tracy Rocker, a College Football Hall of Fame inductee and two-time All-American at Auburn as a defensive lineman, was a defensive line coach at Georgia from 2014–2017 after holding the same position at Auburn from 2009–2010.

== See also ==
- List of NCAA college football rivalry games
- List of most-played college football series in NCAA Division I
