= Chris Davis (cornerback) =

American football player and coach (born 1990)

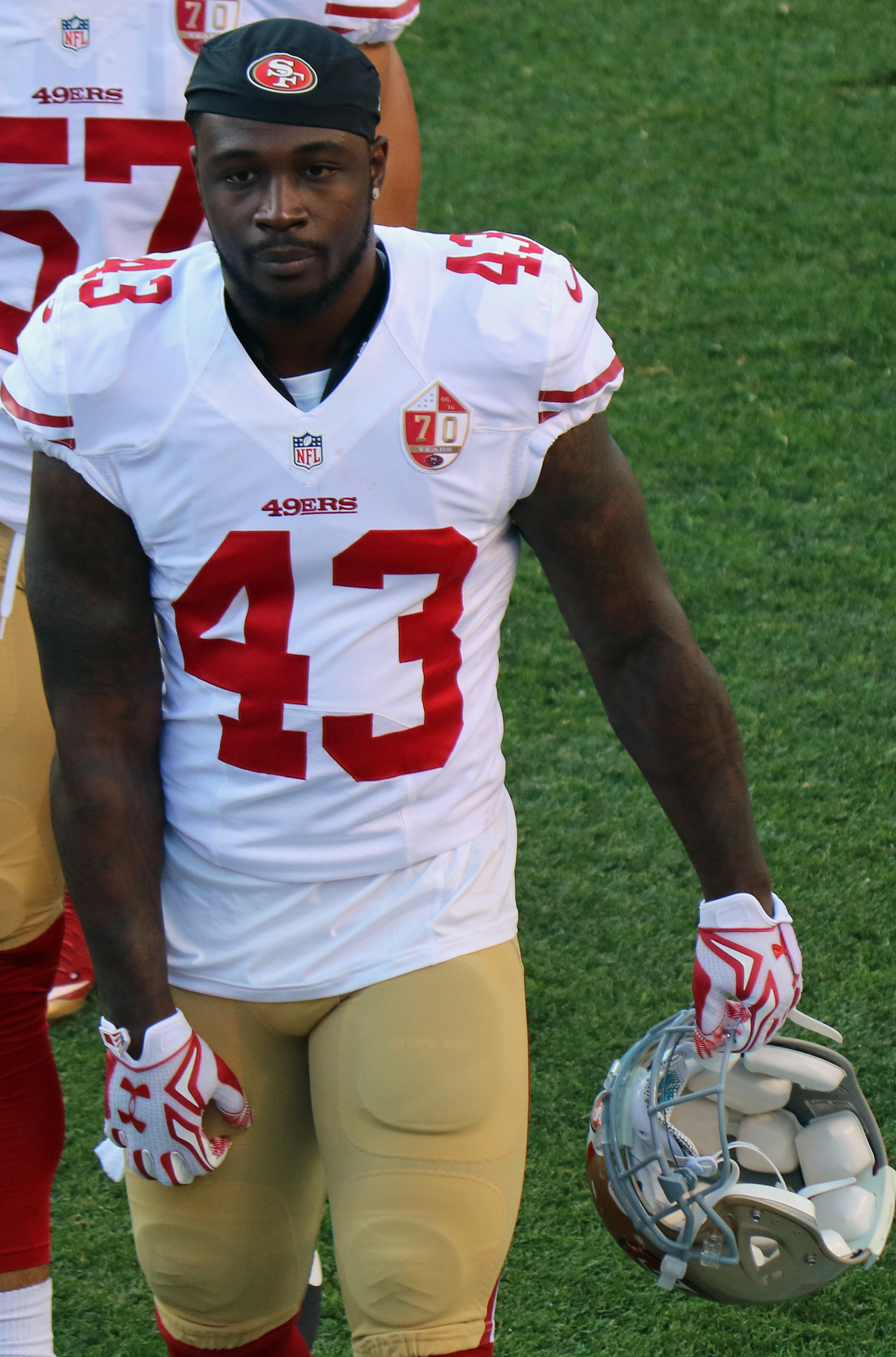
- Davis with the San Francisco 49ers in 2016

No. 20, 43, 21
- Position: Cornerback

Personal information
- Born: November 4, 1990 (age 36); Birmingham, Alabama, U.S.
- Listed height: 5 ft 10 in (1.78 m)
- Listed weight: 201 lb (91 kg)

Career information
- High school: Woodlawn (Birmingham)
- College: Auburn (2010–2013)
- NFL draft: 2014: undrafted

Career history
- San Diego Chargers (2014); San Francisco 49ers (2015–2016); Birmingham Iron (2019)

Awards and highlights
- BCS national champion (2010); First-team All-American (2013); Second-team All-SEC (2013); Chick-fil-A Bowl Defensive MVP (2011)

Career NFL statistics
- Total tackles: 19
- Sacks: 0.5
- Forced fumbles: 1
- Return yards: 609
- Stats at Pro Football Reference

Chris Lynn Davis Jr. (born November 4, 1990) is an American former professional football player who was a cornerback in the National Football League (NFL). He played college football for the Auburn Tigers, earning first-team All-American honors in 2013. He was responsible for the historic “Kick Six,” the final play of the 2013 Iron Bowl when he returned a missed field goal attempt 109 yards from the back of the endzone to score a game winning touchdown as time expired. Davis was signed by the San Diego Chargers as an undrafted free agent in 2014. After his playing career, he became a coach.

== Early life ==
Davis attended Woodlawn High School in Birmingham, Alabama. As a senior, he had 134 carries for 877 yards (6.5 ypc), eight catches for 185 yards, 472 kickoff return yards and 48 punt return yards. Defensively, he had 23 tackles and three pass breakups.

He was considered a three-star recruit by Rivals.com.

== College career ==
Davis was involved in the 2013 Iron Bowl play referred to as "Kick Six." With one second left on the clock and the score tied at 28, Alabama placekicker Adam Griffith missed a 57-yard game-winning field goal attempt which was caught by Davis and returned 109 yards for a game-winning touchdown.

As a senior in 2013, Davis was named an All-American as a return specialist by the Sporting News and CBS Sports. He earned second-team All-SEC honors at cornerback.

== Professional career ==
Pre-draft measurables
Height	Weight	Arm length	Hand span	40-yard dash	10-yard split	20-yard split	20-yard shuttle	Three-cone drill	Vertical jump	Broad jump	Bench press
5 ft 9 7/8 in (1.77 m)	202 lb (92 kg)	31 in (0.79 m)	9 1/4 in (0.23 m)	4.55 s	1.63 s	2.62 s	4.18 s	6.93 s	40.5 in (1.03 m)	10 ft 4 in (3.15 m)	15 reps

=== San Diego Chargers ===
Despite being projected as a 4th–5th round pick, Davis went undrafted in the 2014 NFL draft. However, he was signed by the San Diego Chargers on May 10, 2014. Davis spent most of the year returning kicks averaging 25.1 yards per return. He ended the year with 15 tackles, a pass defended, and a forced fumble. On September 1, 2015, Davis was released.

=== San Francisco 49ers ===
Davis signed with the San Francisco 49ers' practice squad on November 3, 2015. He was promoted to the active roster on November 7.

On October 10, 2016, Davis was placed on injured reserve.

=== Birmingham Iron ===
In 2018, Davis signed with the Birmingham Iron of the Alliance of American Football for the 2019 season. He was placed on injured reserve before the start of the regular season, but was waived from injured reserve on March 4, 2019. He was added to the team's rights list and re-signed to a contract on March 25. He was activated from the rights list on March 26. The league ceased operations in April 2019.

In October 2019, Davis was selected by the Seattle Dragons of the XFL as part of the 2020 XFL draft process.

== Career statistics ==
=== NFL ===
Year	Team	GP	Tackles				Fumbles				Interceptions				Kick returns				
Year	Team	GP	Cmb	Solo	Ast	Sck	Fmb	FF	FR	Yds	Int	Yds	TD	PD	Ret	Yds	Avg	Lng	TD
2014	SD	12	15	13	2	0.0	0	1	0	0	0	0	0	1	19	476	25.1	35	0
2015	SF	3	1	1	0	0.0	0	0	0	0	0	0	0	0	0	0	0	0	0
2016	SF	4	3	1	2	0.5	1	0	0	0	0	0	0	0	6	129	21.5	26	0
Career		19	19	15	4	0.5	1	0	0	0	0	0	0	1	25	605	15.5	35	0

=== College ===
Year	Team	GP	Tackles				Fumbles				Interceptions				Kick returns*				Punt returns			
Year	Team	GP	Cmb	Solo	Ast	Sck	Fmb	FF	FR	Yds	Int	Yds	TD	PD	Ret	Yds	Avg	TD	Ret	Yds	Avg	TD
2010	AUB	9	12	8	4	0	0	0	0	0	0	0	0	3	0	0	0	0	0	0	0	0
2011	AUB	11	60	34	26	0	0	1	0	0	0	0	0	4	0	0	0	0	0	0	0	0
2012	AUB	9	46	25	21	0	0	0	0	0	0	0	0	3	0	0	0	0	0	0	0	0
2013	AUB	12	74	52	22	0	0	1	0	0	0	0	0	14	1	17	17.0	0	17	318	18.7	0
Total		41	192	119	73	0	0	2	0	0	0	0	0	24	1	17	17.0	0	17	318	18.7	0

*the Kick Six is not included here.

== Coaching career ==
In August 2020, Davis was named the cornerback coach for the Pinson Valley High School football team, joining the staff of former Alabama player and college head coach Sam Shade.
