= Josh Harvey-Clemons =

American football player (born 1994)

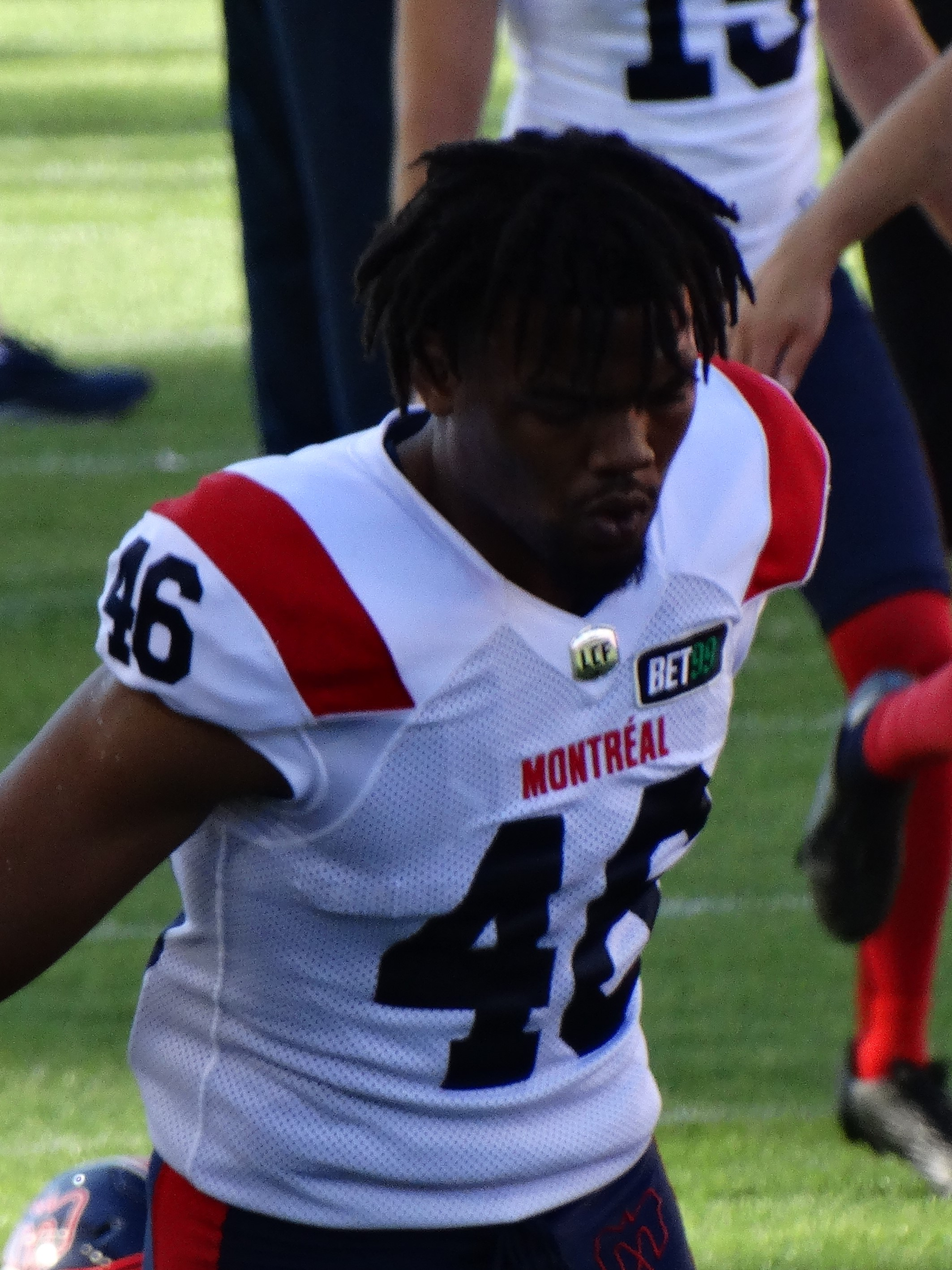
- Harvey-Clemons with the Montreal Alouettes in 2022

No. 40, 46
- Position: Linebacker

Personal information
- Born: February 20, 1994 (age 32); Valdosta, Georgia, U.S.
- Listed height: 6 ft 4 in (1.93 m)
- Listed weight: 245 lb (111 kg)

Career information
- High school: Lowndes (Valdosta)
- College: Georgia (2012–2013); Louisville (2014–2016)
- NFL draft: 2017: 7th round, 230th overall pick

Career history
- Washington Redskins / Football Team (2017–2020); Miami Dolphins (2021)*; Montreal Alouettes (2022); Orlando Guardians (2023)
- * Offseason or practice squad member only

Career NFL statistics
- Total tackles: 41
- Sacks: 1.5
- Pass deflections: 4
- Stats at Pro Football Reference
- Stats at CFL.ca

Josh Harvey-Clemons (born February 20, 1994) is an American former professional football player who was a linebacker in the National Football League (NFL) and Canadian Football League (CFL). He played college football for the Georgia Bulldogs and Louisville Cardinals and was selected by the Washington Redskins in the seventh round of the 2017 NFL draft.

== Professional career ==
Pre-draft measurables
Height	Weight	Arm length	Hand span	Wingspan	40-yard dash	10-yard split	20-yard split	20-yard shuttle	Three-cone drill	Vertical jump	Broad jump	Bench press
6 ft 4 1/4 in (1.94 m)	217 lb (98 kg)	35 3/8 in (0.90 m)	10 3/8 in (0.26 m)	6 ft 10 5/8 in (2.10 m)	4.76 s	1.69 s	2.63 s	4.59 s	7.09 s	33.0 in (0.84 m)	10 ft 1 in (3.07 m)	15 reps
All values from NFL Combine/Pro Day

=== Washington Redskins / Football Team ===
Harvey-Clemons was drafted by the Washington Redskins in the seventh round (230th overall) of the 2017 NFL draft. In his rookie year, he played 10 games primarily as a backup at inside linebacker. He recorded 10 tackles, half a sack, and a pass deflection. Harvey-Clemons opted out of the 2020 season due to concerns about the COVID-19 pandemic as he and his two sons have asthma.

Harvey-Clemons was released on May 19, 2021.

=== Miami Dolphins ===
Harvey-Clemons signed with the Miami Dolphins on August 19, 2021. Harvey-Clemons was released on August 31 during final roster cuts.

=== Montreal Alouettes ===
On February 3, 2022, Harvey-Clemons signed with the Montreal Alouettes of the Canadian Football League. He played in five regular season games, totaling two special teams tackles before being released on September 4, 2022.

=== Orlando Guardians ===
The Orlando Guardians of the XFL selected Harvey-Clemons in the fourth round of the 2023 XFL Supplemental Draft on January 1, 2023. He was placed on the reserve list by the team on March 25, 2023. The Guardians folded when the XFL and United States Football League merged to create the United Football League (UFL).

== See also ==
- Prayer at Jordan–Hare
