= Ricardo Louis =

American football player (born 1994)

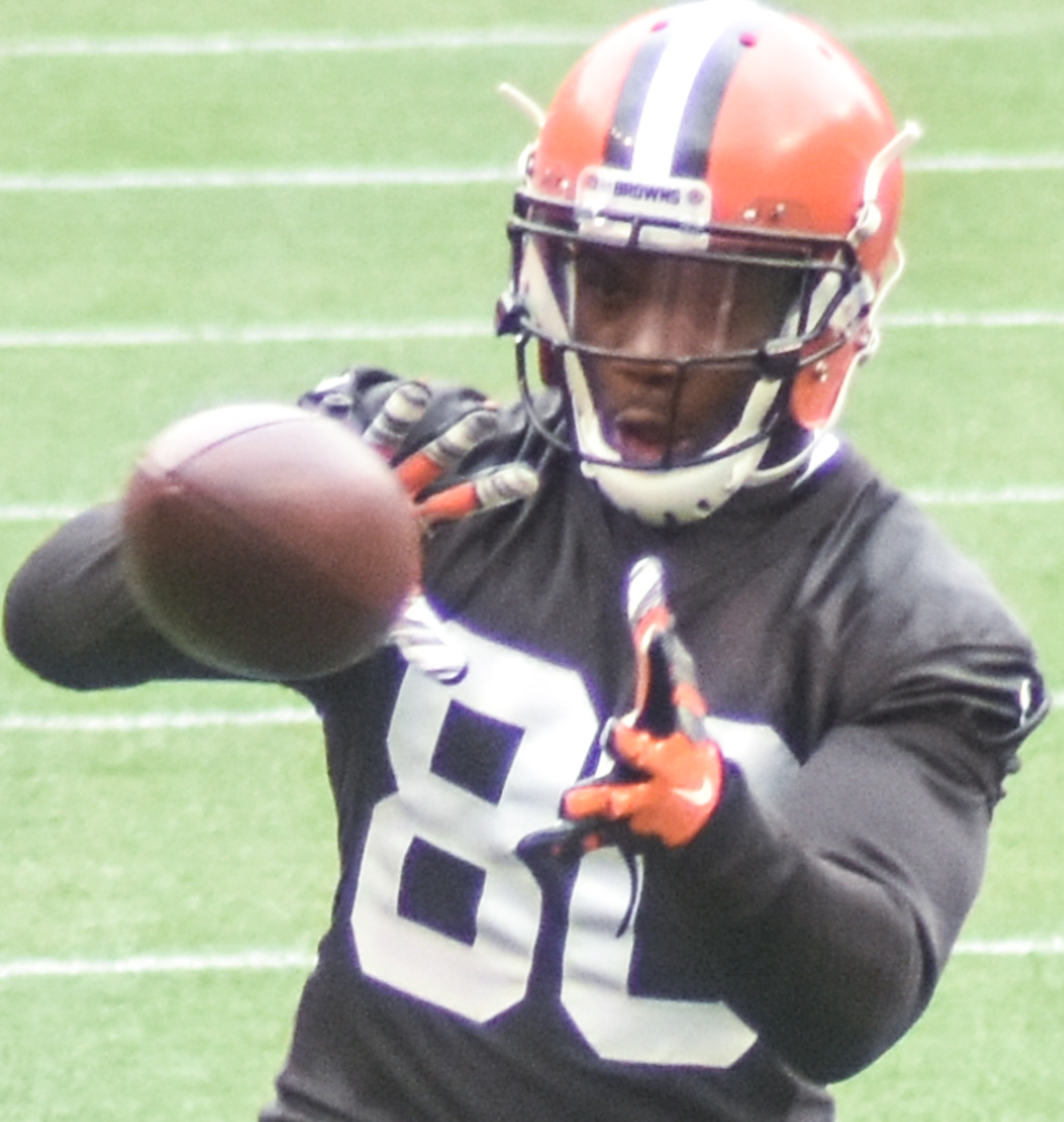
- Louis with the Cleveland Browns in 2016

No. 80, 86
- Position: Wide receiver

Personal information
- Born: March 23, 1994 (age 32); Miami, Florida, U.S.
- Listed height: 6 ft 2 in (1.88 m)
- Listed weight: 215 lb (98 kg)

Career information
- High school: Miami Beach Senior (Miami Beach, Florida)
- College: Auburn
- NFL draft: 2016: 4th round, 114th overall pick

Career history
- Cleveland Browns (2016–2018); Miami Dolphins (2019); Saskatchewan Roughriders (2021)

Career NFL statistics
- Receptions: 45
- Receiving yards: 562
- Stats at Pro Football Reference

Ricardo Louis (born March 23, 1994) is an American former professional football player who was a wide receiver in the National Football League (NFL) and Canadian Football League (CFL). He played college football for the Auburn Tigers and was selected by the Cleveland Browns in the fourth round of the 2016 NFL draft. He played in the NFL for the Browns and in the CFL for the Saskatchewan Roughriders. Louis was also a member of the NFL's Miami Dolphins but did not appear in any games for them.

== Early life ==
Louis played football at Miami Beach Senior High School, where he played at quarterback, running back, wide receiver, tight end, linebacker, and safety. Excellent at all positions, his best performances came at a running back and receiver. In his senior year, he had 14 offensive touchdowns and 60 defensive tackles. ESPN ranked him the 21st best high school player in the nation in 2012.

== College career ==
Louis initially committed to Auburn University, then broke the commitment and committed to Florida State University before recommitting to Auburn.

His most memorable play was a 73-yard (67 m) touchdown reception against the Georgia Bulldogs in 2013, known as the "Prayer at Jordan-Hare".The catch enabled the Tigers to win their division, enter the post-season, and make it into a national championship game. In the 2014 season, he became the first wide receiver in school history to rush for at least 100 yards in a game, against South Carolina. He led the Tigers in receptions (46 for 716 yards (655 m)) and touchdowns (three) as a senior. Louis ended his career at Auburn in 2015 with 98 receptions out of 117 touches for 1,338 yards (1,223 m) and eight touchdowns. Louis' collegiate career was also plagued by dropped passes, and he had six fumbles.

He was nominated his senior year for an ESPY Award.

== Professional career ==
=== Pre-draft ===
Pre-draft measurables
Height	Weight	Arm length	Hand span	40-yard dash	10-yard split	20-yard split	20-yard shuttle	Three-cone drill	Vertical jump	Broad jump	Bench press
6 ft 1 3/4 in (1.87 m)	215 lb (98 kg)	32 3/8 in (0.82 m)	9 1/2 in (0.24 m)	4.43 s	1.53 s	2.61 s	4.32 s	7.07 s	38.0 in (0.97 m)	11 ft 0 in (3.35 m)	18 reps

Louis attended the NFL Scouting Combine in February 2016. His performance there—an 11-foot (3.4 m) broad jump (best among all attending wide receivers), a 40-yard dash of 4.43 seconds, and a vertical jump of 38 inches (0.97 m)—won him widespread attention, and significantly boosted his chances in the coming draft.

=== Cleveland Browns ===
The Cleveland Browns selected Louis in the fourth round, 114th overall, in the 2016 NFL draft. On May 31, he signed a four-year contract worth about $2.9 million, which included a signing bonus worth about $568,000. Louis incurred a hamstring injury during practice on August 13, keeping him out of the rest of the preseason. In 2018, Louis changed his number from #80 to #15, to make way for Jarvis Landry, who was traded previously from the Miami Dolphins. The Browns announced on July 25, 2018 that Louis would miss the entire 2018 season with a neck injury. Louis was waived by the Browns on April 1, 2019.

=== Miami Dolphins ===
On April 8, 2019, Louis signed with the Dolphins. On May 16, the Dolphins placed Louis on injured reserve, ending his 2019 season.

On February 4, 2020, Louis was re-signed to a one-year, $660,000 contract. The Dolphins released him on July 25. Louis was re-signed by the Dolphins on August 8. However, he was released by the team once more on September 1.

=== Saskatchewan Roughriders ===
Louis signed with the Saskatchewan Roughriders of the Canadian Football League on June 21, 2021. He played in nine games, all starts, for the Roughriders in 2021 as both a wide receiver and slotback, catching 18 passes for 213 yards and two touchdowns. Louis was released by Saskatchewan on May 9, 2022.
