= Marshall Morgan =

American football player (born 1993)

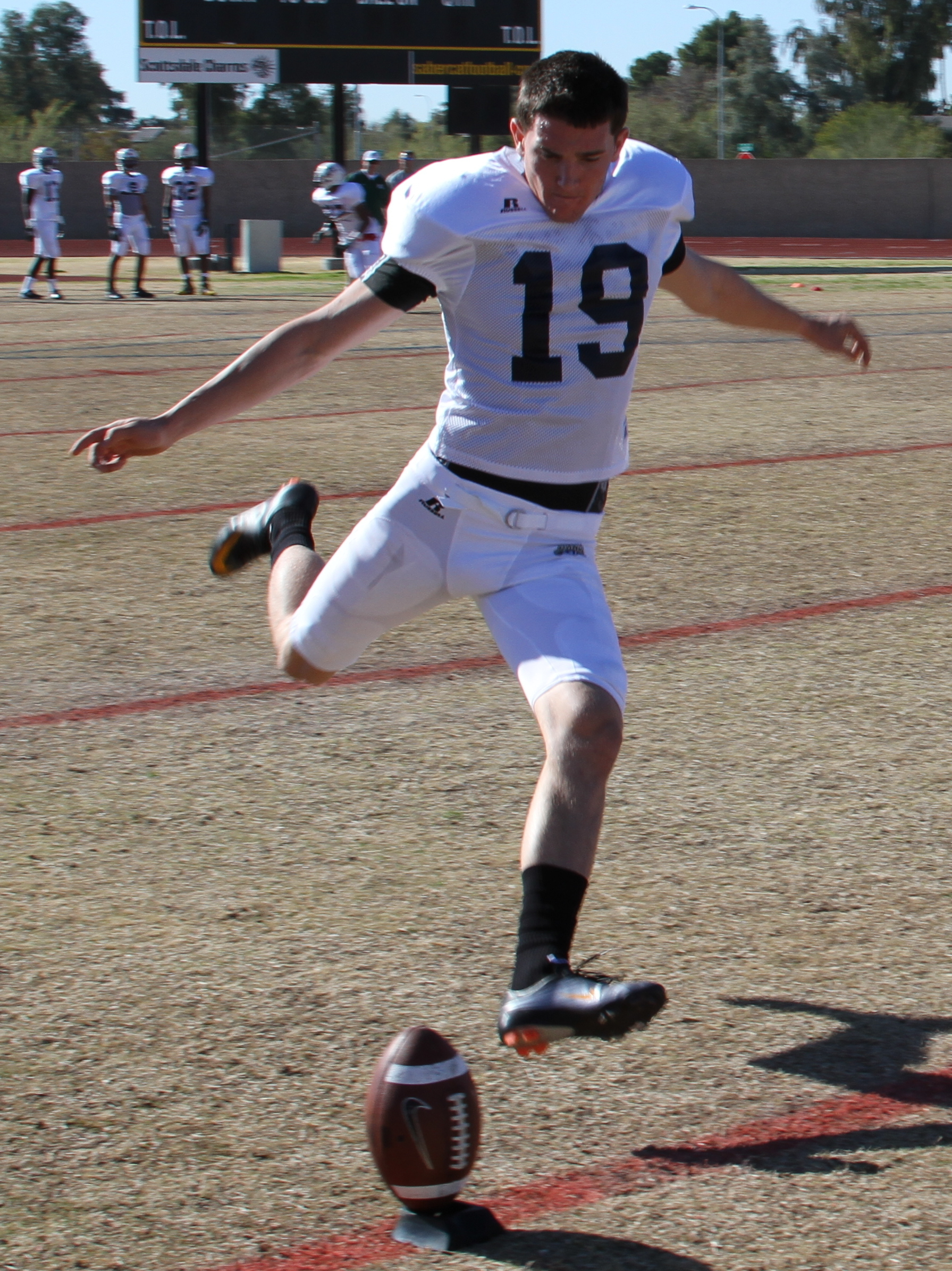
- Morgan in 2011

Profile
- Position: Placekicker

Personal information
- Born: November 28, 1993 (age 32); Fort Lauderdale, Florida, U.S.
- Listed height: 6 ft 2 in (1.88 m)
- Listed weight: 194 lb (88 kg)

Career information
- High school: American Heritage School (Plantation, Florida)
- College: Georgia
- NFL draft: 2016: undrafted

Career history
- Buffalo Bills (2016)*
- * Offseason or practice squad member only

Awards and highlights
- First-team All-SEC (2013)
- Stats at Pro Football Reference

Marshall Morgan (born November 28, 1993) is an American former professional football placekicker. He played college football for Georgia. Morgan has the school record for most completed extra points (215). Morgan is also 3rd in field goals completed (64), and 3rd in total points (407).

== College career ==
At the end of the 2012 season, Morgan completed 8-for-14 (57%) on field goal attempts, and 63-for-67 (94%) on PATs. Morgan kicked a season-long 52-yard field goal against Missouri. Morgan kicked his first field goal against Buffalo.

At the end of the 2013 season, Morgan completed 22-for-24 (92%) on field goal attempts and going for a perfect 47-for-47 in PATs. Morgan kicked a career-long 56-yard field goal and the game-winning 42-yard field goal in overtime at Tennessee. Morgan kicked a career-high 4 field goals against Nebraska.

At the end of the 2014 season, Morgan converted 16 out of 21 field goal attempts (76%) and kicked 67–68 (98%) PATs. Morgan set a school record for most PATs made in a season (67). Morgan kicked a season-long 53-yard field goal against Charleston Southern. Morgan led the SEC in scoring with 115 points. Morgan set the SEC record with 20 consecutive field goals.

In 2015, Morgan scored all nine points for Georgia in a win against Missouri, including the game-winning, 34-yard kick with 1:44 remaining. At the end of the 2015 season, Morgan completed 18 out of 25 (72%) field goal attempts and connected on all 38 PATs.

== Professional career ==
On May 2, 2016, after going undrafted in the 2016 NFL draft, Morgan signed with the Buffalo Bills. He was released on August 1, 2016. He was re-signed to the Bills' practice squad on October 11, 2016. He was released by the Bills on November 2, 2016.
