= 2013 Mississippi State Bulldogs football team =

American college football season

2013 Mississippi State Bulldogs football

Liberty Bowl champion

Liberty Bowl, W 44–7 vs. Rice
- Conference: Southeastern Conference
- Western Division
- Record: 7–6 (3–5 SEC)
- Head coach: Dan Mullen (5th season)
- Offensive coordinator: Les Koenning (5th season)
- Offensive scheme: Spread
- Defensive coordinator: Geoff Collins (3rd season)
- Base defense: 4–3
- Home stadium: Davis Wade Stadium

2013 Southeastern Conference football standings
	Conf.			Overall
Team	W		L	W		L
Eastern Division
No. 5 Missouri x	7	–	1	12	–	2
No. 4 South Carolina	6	–	2	11	–	2
Georgia	5	–	3	8	–	5
No. 24 Vanderbilt	4	–	4	9	–	4
Florida	3	–	5	4	–	8
Tennessee	2	–	6	5	–	7
Kentucky	0	–	8	2	–	10
Western Division
No. 2 Auburn xy$	7	–	1	12	–	2
No. 7 Alabama x%	7	–	1	11	–	2
No. 14 LSU *	5	–	3	10	–	3
No. 18 Texas A&M	4	–	4	9	–	4
Mississippi State	3	–	5	7	–	6
Ole Miss *	3	–	5	8	–	5
Arkansas	0	–	8	3	–	9
Championship: Auburn 59, Missouri 42
$ – BCS representative as conference champion; % – BCS at-large representative; x – Division champion/co-champions; y – Championship game participant; * LSU and Ole Miss vacated all wins (except for Ole Miss' Music City Bowl win) due to NCAA violations.; Rankings from AP Poll

The 2013 Mississippi State Bulldogs football team represented Mississippi State University in the 2013 NCAA Division I FBS football season. The team was coached by Dan Mullen, who was in fifth season with Mississippi State in the 2013 season. The Bulldogs played their home games at Davis Wade Stadium in Starkville, Mississippi, and competed in the Western Division of the Southeastern Conference (SEC).

== Schedule ==
Date	Time	Opponent	Site	TV	Result	Attendance
August 31	2:30 p.m.	vs. No. 13 Oklahoma State*	Reliant Stadium; Houston, TX (Texas Kickoff)	ABC/ESPN2	L 3–21	35,874
September 7	2:30 p.m.	Alcorn State*	Davis Wade Stadium; Starkville, MS	CSS	W 51–7	55,085
September 14	6:00 p.m.	at Auburn	Jordan–Hare Stadium; Auburn, AL	ESPN2	L 20–24	85,817
September 21	6:30 p.m.	Troy*	Davis Wade Stadium; Starkville, MS	SECRN	W 62–7	55,096
October 5	6:00 p.m.	No. 10 LSU	Davis Wade Stadium; Starkville, MS (rivalry)	ESPN	L 26–59	57,113
October 12	6:30 p.m.	Bowling Green*^{†}	Davis Wade Stadium; Starkville, MS	SECRN	W 21–20	55,148
October 24	6:30 p.m.	Kentucky	Davis Wade Stadium; Starkville, MS	ESPN	W 28–22	55,102
November 2	11:21 a.m.	at No. 14 South Carolina	Williams-Brice Stadium; Columbia, SC	SECTV	L 16–34	82,111
November 9	2:30 p.m.	at No. 11 Texas A&M	Kyle Field; College Station, TX	CBS	L 41–51	88,504
November 16	6:45 p.m.	No. 1 Alabama	Davis Wade Stadium; Starkville, MS (rivalry)	ESPN	L 7–20	57,211
November 23	11:21 a.m.	at Arkansas	War Memorial Stadium; Little Rock, AR	SECTV	W 24–17 ^{OT}	45,198
November 28	6:30 p.m.	Ole Miss	Davis Wade Stadium; Starkville, MS (Egg Bowl)	ESPN	W 17–10 ^{OT}	55,113
December 31	3:00 p.m.	vs. Rice*	Liberty Bowl Memorial Stadium; Memphis, TN (Liberty Bowl)	ESPN	W 44–7	57,846
*Non-conference game; ^{†}Homecoming; Rankings from AP Poll; All times are in Central time

Schedule source:

== Game summaries ==
=== #13 Oklahoma State ===
Oklahoma State vs. Mississippi State

Team	1	2	3	4	Total
Bulldogs	3	0	0	0	3
• Cowboys	0	7	7	7	21

- Date: August 31
- Location: Reliant Stadium
  Houston
- Game start: 2:30 p.m. CST
- Elapsed time: 3:20
- Game attendance: 35,874
- Game weather: 72 °F (22 °C), Indoors
- Referee: Dan Capron
- TV announcers (ABC/ESPN2): Bob Wischusen, Rod Gilmore and Quint Kessenich

Scoring summary
1	8:38	MSU	Devon Bell 40-yard kick good	MSU 3–0
2	2:16	OSU	J. W. Walsh 3-yard touchdown run, Ben Grogan kick good	OSU 7–3
3	10:41	OSU	Jeremy Smith 1-yard touchdown run, Ben Grogan kick good	OSU 14–3
4	14:33	OSU	Jeremy Smith 10-yard touchdown run, Ben Grogan kick good	OSU 21–3

The No. 13 Oklahoma State Cowboys have been known more for their offense than their defense. The Cowboys' defense, however, kept Oklahoma State in the game long enough for their offense to wake up against the Mississippi State Bulldogs. J.W. Walsh threw for 135 yards and ran for another 125 and a touchdown to lead Oklahoma State to a 21–3 win over Mississippi State in the Texas Kickoff in Houston's Reliant Stadium.

Walsh finished 18 of 27 after relieving starter Clint Chelf on the Cowboys' third series. Jeremy Smith rushed for 102 yards and two touchdowns on 15 carries for Oklahoma State (1–0), which piled up 432 yards on offense after struggling for most of the first half.

Mississippi State's Tyler Russell finished 10 of 16 for 133 yards before being helped off the field and taken to the locker room in the third quarter after being brought down on a scramble. Dak Prescott replaced Russell, throwing for 89 yards on seven of 17 passing. LaDarius Perkins rushed for 50 yards on 16 carries and caught three passes for 52 yards for the Bulldogs (0–1), which had only 333 yards of offense and had trouble keeping drives going, finishing two of 16 on third down conversions. Oklahoma State's defense also had three sacks and intercepted two Mississippi State passes.

Mississippi State marched down the field in 57 yards on 13 plays taking over six minutes off the clock, but the Bulldogs were only able to get Devon Bell's 40-yard field goal to take a 3–0 lead. Russell was 5 of 7 on the drive for 58 yards. Oklahoma State's offense gained only 67 yards with less than four minutes remaining in the first half before Walsh got going. Walsh worked the quarterback keeper three times for gains of 46 yards down the left sideline, 12 yards down the left sideline to the MSU 3 and capping it off with a 3-yard touchdown run to give the Cowboys a 7–3 lead with 2:16 left in the half. The Bulldogs looked to respond before the half as Jameon Lewis weaved the kickoff return 66 yards to the OSU 34, but a holding penalty and a sack by Tyler Johnson stopped the drive.

OSU continued the offensive momentum in the second half, driving 75 yards in 11 plays to take a 14–3 lead on a Smith 1-yard run with 10:41 left in the third. Smith tacked on a 20-yard touchdown run to begin the fourth quarter to up the lead to 21–3.

=== Alcorn State ===
Alcorn State at Mississippi State

Team	1	2	3	4	Total
Braves	0	0	0	7	7
• Bulldogs	14	23	7	7	51

- Date: September 7
- Location: Davis Wade Stadium
  Starkville, MS
- Game start: 2:30 p.m. CST
- Elapsed time: 3:00
- Game attendance: 55,085
- Game weather: 92 °F (33 °C), Mostly sunny, winds SE 2mph
- Referee: Dan Romeo
- TV announcers (CSS): Mike Morgan, Cole Cubelic and Paul Carcaterra

Scoring summary
1	9:22	MSU	Dak Prescott 11-yard touchdown run, Devon Bell kick good	MSU 7–0
1	6:16	MSU	Derrick Milton 3-yard touchdown run, Devon Bell kick good	MSU 14–0
2	11:34	MSU	Derrick Milton 14-yard touchdown pass from Dak Presscott, Devon Bell kick good	MSU 21–0
2	6:28	MSU	Ashton Shumpert 1-yard touchdown run, Devon Bell kick good	MSU 28–0
2	5:15	MSU	Jameon Lewis 31-yard touchdown pass from Dak Presscott, Devon Bell kick failed	MSU 34–0
2	0:58	MSU	Devon Bell 26-yard kick good	MSU 37–0
3	13:57	MSU	Ashton Shumpert 1-yard touchdown run, Devon Bell kick good	MSU 44–0
4	11:42	ASU	Tollette George 25-yard touchdown pass from John Gibbs, Jr., Haiden McCraney kick good	MSU 44–7
4	5:00	MSU	Nick Griffin 10-yard touchdown run, Devon Bell kick good	MSU 51–7

Dak Prescott threw for 174 yards and two touchdowns in his first career start and Mississippi State breezed past Alcorn State 51–7. Mississippi State (1–1) didn't use several regular starters, including quarterback Tyler Russell, who suffered a concussion in the Bulldogs' season-opening loss to Oklahoma State. It didn't matter. The Bulldogs led 21–0 by early in the second quarter and 37–0 by halftime. It was the most points in the first half for the program since 1996. Mississippi State's Ashton Shumpert rushed for 98 yards and two touchdowns. Nick Griffin added 54 yards on the ground and a touchdown.

Alcorn State (1–1), which plays in the Football Championship Subdivision, managed just two first downs in the first three quarters. The Braves scored their only touchdown early in the fourth quarter on a 25-yard pass from John Gibbs Jr. to Tollete George.

The 6-foot-2, 230-pound Prescott showed his poise early in the first quarter by converting two straight passes on 4th and 9 for a first down. The first was an 18-yard strike to Joe Morrow, but it was disallowed after officials ruled Alcorn State had called timeout. A sold out Davis Wade Stadium groaned, but Prescott came right back and hit Malcolm Johnson for a 23-yard gain. Two plays later, Prescott burst through the line for an 11-yard touchdown run and a 7–0 lead. The rout was just beginning. Mississippi State outgained Alcorn State 308–30 in total yards on the way to the huge halftime lead. Prescott completed 12 of 19 passes while also rushing for 20 yards and a touchdown. He didn't play in the second half.

The second half started just as lopsided. Brandon Holloway ran the kickoff back 95 yards to Alcorn's 1-yard line, and Mississippi State scored two plays later for a 44–0 lead with 13:57 left in the third quarter. Alcorn State's George finished with four catches for 80 yards and the Braves' only touchdown. Gibbs was 11 of 25 passing for 135 yards, one touchdown and one interception.

=== Auburn ===
Mississippi State at Auburn

Team	1	2	3	4	Total
Bulldogs	6	7	7	0	20
• Tigers	11	3	3	7	24

- Date: September 14
- Location: Jordan–Hare Stadium
  Auburn, AL
- Game start: 6:00 p.m. CST
- Elapsed time: 3:14
- Game attendance: 85,817
- Game weather: 78 °F (26 °C), Sunny, winds NE 4mph
- Referee: Matt Moore
- TV announcers (ESPN2): Mark Jones, Brock Huard and Maria Taylor

Scoring summary
1	10:53	AU	Cody Parkey 40-yard kick good	AU 3–0
1	4:54	AU	Quan Bray 76-yard touchdown pass from Nick Marshall, Brandon Fulse pass from Ryan White	AU 11–0
1	4:09	MSU	Jameon Lewis 14-yard touchdown run, Nick Griffin rush failed	AU 11–6
2	13:36	AU	Cody Parkey 40-yard kick good	AU 14–6
2	5:02	MSU	Dak Presscott 5-yard touchdown run, Devon Bell kick good	AU 14–13
3	12:38	MSU	Dak Presscott 2-yard touchdown run, Devon Bell kick good	MSU 20–14
3	9:53	AU	Cody Parkey 47-yard kick good	MSU 20–17
4	0:10	AU	C. J. Uzomah 11-yard touchdown pass from Nick Marshall, Cody Parkey kick good	AU 24–20

Nick Marshall hit C.J. Uzomah for an 11-yard touchdown with 10 seconds left to lift Auburn to a 24–20 victory over Mississippi State on Saturday night, ending the Tigers' 10-game Southeastern Conference losing streak. Marshall led the Tigers (3–0, 1–0 SEC) down the field with big running and passing plays in easily his best game. The junior-college transfer completed his first five passes for 55 yards in leading Auburn 88 yards over the final 1:56. He then ran 11 yards on 3rd-and-10 before lofting the decisive throw to the right corner of the end zone. The play was reviewed and instant replay officials ruled that the 6-foot-4 tight end, Uzomah, was pushed out of bounds, enabling him to come back.

Subbing for an injured Tyler Russell for a second straight game, quarterback Dak Prescott ran for 133 yards and two touchdowns and passed for 213 for Mississippi State (1–2, 0–1). Russell sustained a concussion in the opener against Oklahoma State.

With the game on the line, Marshall suddenly looked like anything but a guy who's had six weeks to learn an offense. He hit freshman Marcus Davis on three straight passes to cover 29 yards, then had a 17-yarder to Jaylon Denson. He also salvaged short gains with a couple of runs before heading out of bounds. Tre Mason's 3-yard run pushed it to the 11 before Auburn called timeout with 15 seconds left. Marshall was 23-of-34 passing for 339 yards and two touchdowns but was intercepted twice. He passed for just 246 yards and two TDs in his first two games as starter combined. Marshall showed a knack for turning potential miscues into big plays. He dropped the shotgun snap, collected it on the bounce and hit a wide-open Quan Bray downfield for a 76-yard touchdown on the opening drive. Ryan White then hit Brandon Fulse for the two-point conversion. In the third quarter, Marshall caught his own batted pass and raced for a 37-yard gain. The Bulldogs forced the Tigers to settle for Cody Parkey's 47-yard field goal after Jamerson Love tackled Corey Grant for a loss. Parkey also had a 40-yarder and 19-yarder.

The Bulldogs were able to keep in check Auburn tailbacks Corey Grant, Tre Mason and Cameron Artis-Payne, who had been the strength of the offense. Prescott completed 15 of 28 passes and carried 22 times. LaDarius Perkins gained 36 yards after he was one of seven starters held out of a route of FCS team Alcorn State.

Mississippi State coach Dan Mullen gambled on fourth-and-2 from his own 29 late, and Prescott delivered with a 3-yard gain. That enabled the Bulldogs to burn off another two minutes before punting, though they couldn't get another first down. It proved just enough time for the Tigers.

Mississippi State twice forced turnovers in Auburn territory in the second half, but failed to produce points both times.

=== Troy ===
Troy at Mississippi State

Team	1	2	3	4	Total
Trojans	7	0	0	0	7
• Bulldogs	10	35	7	10	62

- Date: September 21
- Location: Davis Wade Stadium
  Starkville, MS
- Game start: 6:30 p.m. CST
- Elapsed time: 3:06
- Game attendance: 55,096
- Game weather: 80 °F (27 °C), Clear skies, winds N 5mph
- Referee: Tony Backert
- TV announcers (SECRN): Bob Rathbun, Tim Couch, and Elizabeth Moreau

Scoring summary
1	13:00	MSU	Jamerson Love 70-yard interception return, Devon Bell kick good	MSU 7–0
1	3:08	MSU	Devon Bell 25-yard kick good	MSU 10–0
1	0:10	TU	Eric Thomas 5-yard touchdown pass from Corey Robinson, Jedd Solomon kick good	MSU 10–7
2	13:44	MSU	Dak Presscott 36-yard touchdown pass from Jameon Lewis, Devon Bell kick good	MSU 17–7
2	11:55	MSU	Dak Presscott 22-yard touchdown run, Devon Bell kick good	MSU 24–7
2	8:08	MSU	Dak Presscott 11-yard touchdown run, Devon Bell kick good	MSU 31–7
2	3:03	MSU	Josh Robinson 19-yard touchdown run, Devon Bell kick good	MSU 38–7
2	1:00	MSU	Jameon Lewis 50-yard touchdown pass from Dak Presscott, Devon Bell kick good	MSU 45–7
3	10:28	MSU	Jameon Lewis 8-yard touchdown run, Devon Bell kick good	MSU 52–7
4	11:29	MSU	Evan Sobiesk 24-yard kick good	MSU 55–7
4	4:47	MSU	Derrick Milton 10-yard touchdown run, Evan Sobiesk kick good	MSU 62–7

Dak Prescott threw for 233 yards and a touchdown, rushed for 53 yards and two touchdowns and caught a 36-yard touchdown pass to lead Mississippi State over Troy 62–7. Prescott's diverse and efficient performance was matched by Jameon Lewis, who caught a 50-yard touchdown pass, rushed for an 8-yard touchdown and threw the 36-yard touchdown that Prescott caught on a trick play. Prescott was starting just his third career game. The 6-foot-2, 230-pound sophomore completed 13 of 21 passes.

Mississippi State (2–2) led 10–7 after the first quarter, but erupted for 35 points in the second quarter to take a 45–7 halftime lead. Troy (2–2) never recovered from the brutal second quarter. Corey Robinson, who is the NCAA's active leader in career passing yards, completed 15 of 25 passes for just 105 yards, one touchdown and one interception. It was the most points Mississippi State has scored in a game since 1994. The Bulldogs finished with 551 total yards.

Prescott and Lewis, Mississippi State didn't have many players with big individual numbers. That's because just about any Bulldog who touched the ball produced. Ten players caught a pass and nine had at least one rushing attempt.

The Troy-Mississippi State series has traditionally been close, with the Trojans even earning one of the biggest wins in school history against the Bulldogs in 2001. But this one turned ugly by halftime.

=== #10 Louisiana State ===
Louisiana State at Mississippi State

Team	1	2	3	4	Total
• Tigers	14	14	3	28	59
Bulldogs	9	14	3	0	26

- Date: October 5
- Location: Davis Wade Stadium
  Starkville, MS
- Game start: 6:00 p.m. CST
- Elapsed time: 3:34
- Game attendance: 57,113
- Game weather: 70 °F (21 °C), Clear skies, winds light
- Referee: Ken Williamson
- TV announcers (SECRN): Joe Tessitore, Matt Millen, and Maria Taylor

Scoring summary
1	10:02	LSU	Kenny Hilliard 3-yard touchdown run, Colby Delahoussaye kick good	LSU 7–0
1	8:42	MSU	Dak Presscott 28-yard touchdown run, Dak Presscott pass failed	LSU 7–6
1	7:18	LSU	Jeremy Hill 69-yard touchdown run, Colby Delahoussaye kick good	LSU 14–6
1	3:04	MSU	Devon Bell 35-yard kick good	LSU 14–9
2	14:51	LSU	Kenny Hilliard 34-yard touchdown run, Colby Delahoussaye kick good	LSU 21–9
2	11:59	MSU	Jameon Lewis 20-yard touchdown pass from Tyler Russell, Devon Bell kick good	LSU 21–16
2	6:28	MSU	De'Runnya Wilson 59-yard touchdown pass from Tyler Russell, Devon Bell kick good	MSU 23–21
2	0:17	LSU	Odell Beckham 14-yard touchdown pass from Zach Mettenberger, Colby Delahoussaye kick good	LSU 28–23
3	12:01	MSU	Devon Bell 22-yard kick good	LSU 28–26
3	4:33	LSU	Colby Delahoussaye 29-yard kick good	LSU 31–26
4	14:50	LSU	Odell Beckham 33-yard touchdown pass from Zach Mettenberger, Colby Delahoussaye kick good	LSU 38–26
4	14:19	LSU	Jeremy Hill 5-yard touchdown run, Colby Delahoussaye kick good	LSU 45–26
4	6:46	LSU	Alfred Blue 17-yard touchdown run, Colby Delahoussaye kick good	LSU 52–26
4	1:21	LSU	Kenny Hilliard 4-yard touchdown run, Colby Delahoussaye kick good	LSU 59–26

Zach Mettenberger surveyed the field with plenty of time to throw and then delivered a perfect spiral to Odell Beckham Jr., who stopped short of the sideline, spun inside and galloped 33 yards untouched for the touchdown. It was the ninth and final time the two hooked up for a completion, and it proved to be the knockout blow. Mettenberger threw for 340 yards and two touchdowns, Beckham had 179 yards receiving and two touchdowns and No. 10 LSU blew past Mississippi State for a 59–26 victory.

It was a tight game for three quarters, but Mettenberger's touchdown to Beckham gave LSU a 38–26 lead on the first play of the fourth quarter and Mississippi State couldn't respond. LSU closed the game on a 31–0 run, including four touchdowns in the fourth quarter. Mettenberger completed 25 of 29 passes in another impressive performance during the senior's breakout season. Beckham was his favorite target – but Jarvis Landry also caught eight passes for 96 yards. It was a nearly flawless performance, and helped erase some of the sting of last week's 44–41 loss to Georgia. LSU's Jeremy Hill added 157 yards rushing and two touchdowns while Kenny Hilliard added 39 yards rushing and three touchdowns. The Tigers (5–1, 2–1 Southeastern Conference) have won 14 straight over Mississippi State (2–3, 0–2) dating back to 1999. LSU has a 21–1 record under Miles following a loss.

Mississippi State's Dak Prescott threw for 106 yards and rushed for 103 more. Jameon Lewis caught seven passes for 111 yards and a touchdown. The Bulldogs' offense was good, especially early, but LSU's was even better. The Tigers' receiver duo of Landry and Beckham was unstoppable, even when Mississippi State appeared to have good coverage, and Mettenberger found them early and often. The Tigers finished with 563 total yards.

LSU needed all those yards, because the defense was gashed for a second straight week. The Tigers gave up nearly 500 yards last week in a loss to Georgia and Mississippi State had some early success with a two-quarterback system. The 6-foot-2, 230-pound Prescott has been terrific in Russell's place, providing much more of a running threat. On the team's first offensive drive, he rewarded Mullen's confidence with a 28-yard touchdown run to pull the Bulldogs to 7–6. Russell entered the game early in the second quarter and also had immediate success, throwing a 20-yard touchdown to Lewis to pull Mississippi State to 21–16 in the second quarter. The Bulldogs took a 23–21 lead on Russell's 59-yard touchdown pass to De'Runnya Wilson, but LSU responded with a 14-yard touchdown pass from Mettenberger to Beckham to take a 28–23 lead into halftime. Russell's second touchdown pass was the 39th of his career, which set a Mississippi State record. He finished 7 of 11 for 146 yards passing.

The teams combined for 608 total yards in the first half – 334 for LSU and 274 for Mississippi State. LSU's defense tightened in the second half, giving up just three points.

=== Bowling Green ===
Bowling Green at Mississippi State

Team	1	2	3	4	Total
Falcons	3	10	7	0	20
• Bulldogs	14	7	0	0	21

- Date: October 12
- Location: Davis Wade Stadium
  Starkville, MS
- Game start: 6:30 p.m. CST
- Elapsed time: 3:10
- Game attendance: 55,148
- Game weather: 81 °F (27 °C), Clear skies, winds light
- Referee: Tom Ritter
- TV announcers (SECRN): Bob Rathbun, Tim Couch and Elizabeth Moreau

Scoring summary
1	9:58	MSU	LaDarius Perkins 1-yard touchdown run, Devon Bell kick good	MSU 7–0
1	5:36	BGSU	Tyler Tate 35-yard kick good	MSU 7–3
1	5:24	MSU	Dak Presscott 75-yard touchdown run, Devon Bell kick good	MSU 14–3
2	4:15	BGSU	Andre Givins 7-yard touchdown run, Tyler Tate kick good	MSU 14–10
2	1:04	MSU	Dak Presscott 10-yard touchdown run, Devon Bell kick good	MSU 21–10
2	0:00	BGSU	Tyler Tate 45-yard kick good	MSU 21–13
3	3:57	BGSU	Matt Johnson 2-yard touchdown run, Tyler Tate kick good	MSU 21–20

Dak Prescott rushed for 139 yards and 2 touchdowns to lead Mississippi State to a 21–20 win over Bowling Green in a non-conference game Saturday night. After a failed fourth-and-1 by MSU, Bowling Green (5–2) had the ball and 4:21 on the clock at the end of the game, but couldn't get inside field goal range. Mississippi State (3–3) had 422 yards of offense, 245 on the ground as the Bulldogs won their 11th straight nonconference home game.

The game was a back-and-forth affair. Mississippi State opened the game on a 9-play, 75-yard drive that ended in a LaDarius Perkins touchdown. Bowling Green's BooBoo Gates intercepted Prescott on MSU's next offensive series, and the Falcons eventually settled for a 35-yard field goal by Tyler Tate. Prescott responded on the next drive by rushing for a 75-yard touchdown. In the second quarter, Bowling Green answered with a 96-yard drive capped off by a 7-yardAndre Givens touchdown run. Mississippi State countered with a 75-yard drive and a 10-yard Prescott touchdown run with 1:04 left in the second quarter. But quarterback Matt Johnson worked Bowling Green into field goal range, and Tate nailed a 45-yarder to end the first half.

Tate missed a 45-yard field goal on the opening drive of the third quarter, but Bowling Green responded with a 7-play touchdown drive on its next possession, to pull within one point; the eventual final margin. With 4:21 left in the game, Mississippi State went for a fourth-and-1 on the Bowling Green six yard line. Prescott's rush was inches short, and the Bulldogs turned it over on downs. Johnson completed four passes and Green rushed once to get the Falcons to midfield. But then the drive stalled, and Johnson failed to complete a fourth-and-11 to Ryan Burbrink, and Mississippi State ran out the clock.

For MSU, Perkins rushed for 83 yards and one touchdown. Perkins, Joe Morrow and Jameon Lewis each caught four passes. Prescott was also 7-of-11 passing for 75 yards and one interception. Mullen again used both Prescott, a sophomore, and veteran quarterback Tyler Russell throughout the game. Russell finished 12-of-14 for 102 yards.

Johnson was 19-of-33 for 194 yards for Bowling Green. Travis Green rushed for 99 yards and Ryan Burbrink caught four passes for a game-high 66 yards. Bowling Green's Gates was ejected in the second quarter for targeting.

=== Kentucky ===
Kentucky at Mississippi State

Team	1	2	3	4	Total
Kentucky	7	3	9	3	22
• Bulldogs	14	7	7	0	28

- Date: October 24
- Location: Davis Wade Stadium
  Starkville, MS
- Game start: 6:30 p.m. CST
- Elapsed time: 3:24
- Game attendance: 55,102
- Game weather: 65 °F (18 °C), Clear skies, winds light
- Referee: Hubert Owens
- TV announcers (ESPN): Rece Davis, Jesse Palmer, and David Pollack

Scoring summary
1	11:28	MSU	Malcolm Johnson 60-yard touchdown pass from Dak Prescott, Devon Bell kick good	MSU 7–0
1	8:38	UK	Ryan Timmons 51-yard touchdown pass from Maxwell Smith, Joe Mansour kick good	Tie 7–7
1	6:34	MSU	Jameon Lewis 19-yard touchdown run, Devon Bell kick good	MSU 14–7
2	6:14	MSU	Jameon Lewis 17-yard touchdown pass from Dak Prescott, Devon Bell kick good	MSU 21–7
2	0:31	UK	Joe Mansour 45-yard kick good	MSU 21–10
3	5:26	UK	Team Safety	MSU 21–12
3	5:26	UK	Jojo Kemp 14-yard touchdown run, Joe Mansour kick good	MSU 21–19
3	0:36	MSU	Dak Prescott 17-yard touchdown pass from Jameon Lewis, Devon Bell kick good	MSU 28–19
4	8:15	UK	Joe Mansour 45-yard kick good	MSU 28–22

Mississippi State coach Dan Mullen came to the postgame press conference, sat in his chair, adjusted the microphone and then let out a strange noise that was somewhere between a scream and sigh of relief. The Bulldogs had picked up their first Southeastern Conference victory of the season. But it wasn't easy at all. Mississippi State beat Kentucky 28–22 on Thursday night at Davis Wade Stadium. The Bulldogs built a 21–7 lead in the first half, but couldn't secure the game until Kentucky's last drive fell short at Mississippi State's 29 with 21 seconds left.

Dak Prescott threw for 268 yards and two touchdowns and also caught a 17-yard touchdown pass. He completed a career-high 23 of 34 passes and also rushed for 33 yards. Jameon Lewis had a 19-yard touchdown run, caught a 17-yard scoring pass and also threw the 17-yard touchdown to Prescott on a trick play. Mississippi State (4–3, 1–2 SEC) beat Kentucky (1–6, 0–4) for a fifth straight season. It was the second time that season Lewis had rushing, receiving and passing touchdowns in a game. The 5-foot-9, 195-pound senior was a quarterback in high school and Mullen relishes his diverse skill set.

Kentucky's Joe Mansour made a 44-yard field goal with 8:15 remaining to pull the Wildcats to 28–22. Mississippi State chewed up 6 minutes of clock the ensuing next drive, but Kentucky had one final chance. The Wildcats methodically moved downfield until Maxwell Smith's fourth-down pass missed its target and Mississippi State escaped.

Kentucky pulled to 21–19 in the third quarter on Jojo Kemp's 14-yard touchdown run. Then in what proved to be a key moment, the Wildcats recovered an onside kick, only to have it disallowed because of an offsides penalty. Mississippi State took advantage. A 74-yard drive ended on the halfback pass from Lewis to Prescott, who handed the ball off before leaking into the open field for the catch, touchdown and 28–19 lead. Prescott, a 6-foot-2, 230-pound sophomore, completed 11 of 18 passes for 160 yards and two touchdowns in the first half, helping Mississippi State to a 21–10 halftime lead.

Prescott's first touchdown pass – a 60-yard fling to a wide open Malcolm Johnson – came after he danced out of the pocket while avoiding a sack. Kentucky's defense shifted forward because of Prescott's ability to run, and it gave Johnson time to slip behind the secondary undetected. The Bulldogs had 296 total yards in the first half. Mississippi State started the game with the intention of using two quarterbacks, but Tyler Russell suffered a sprained ankle on his first series and never returned.

Kentucky's offense had a few good early moments – especially on a 51-yard screen pass from Smith to Timmons that tied the game at 7 – but the Wildcats became predictable because of their inability to throw downfield. Smith has dealt with pain in his throwing shoulder all season and wasn't close on most of his attempts to complete long passes. Kentucky's Smith completed 18 of 33 passes for 160 yards and one touchdown. Backup Jalen Whitlow led one touchdown drive, but was hampered because of a previous ankle injury. Raymond Sanders had 86 yards rushing.

Mississippi State safety Nickoe Whitley was ejected in the second quarter after earning two personal foul penalties over a span of four plays. The extra 30 yards greatly aided Kentucky on a drive that ended on a 45-yard field goal by Mansour.

=== #14 South Carolina ===
Mississippi State at South Carolina

Team	1	2	3	4	Total
Bulldogs	7	3	0	6	16
• Gamecocks	14	3	17	0	34

- Date: November 2
- Location: Williams-Brice Stadium
  Columbia, SC
- Game start: 11:21 a.m. CST
- Elapsed time: 3:24
- Game attendance: 82,111
- Game weather: 68 °F (20 °C), Sunny, winds W 5mph
- Referee: Tom Ritter
- TV announcers (SECTV): Dave Neal, Andre Ware, and Cara Capuano

Scoring summary
1	8:46	MSU	Dak Prescott 1-yard touchdown run, Evan Sobiesk kick good	MSU 7–0
1	6:23	USC	Shaq Roland 14-yard touchdown pass from Connor Shaw, Elliott Fry kick good	Tie 7–7
1	1:20	USC	Shaq Roland 43-yard touchdown pass from Connor Shaw, Elliott Fry kick good	USC 14–7
2	11:45	USC	Elliott Fry 44-yard kick good	USC 17–7
2	4:15	MSU	Evan Sobiesk 38-yard kick good	USC 17–10
3	12:54	USC	Damiere Byrd 6-yard touchdown pass from Connor Shaw, Elliott Fry kick good	USC 24–10
3	7:52	USC	Jerell Adams 4-yard touchdown pass from Connor Shaw, Elliott Fry kick good	USC 31–10
3	2:07	USC	Elliott Fry 37-yard kick good	USC 34–10
4	5:38	MSU	Dak Prescott 11-yard touchdown run, Dak Prescott pass failed	USC 34–16

Connor Shaw passed for four touchdowns, Mike Davis moved past 1,000 yards this season and the 14th-ranked Gamecocks got five turnovers to defeat the Bulldogs 34–16 for their school-record tying 15th straight home victory Saturday. It had been a long time coming for a group that had been one of the Southeastern Conference's best defenses the past few years. The Gamecocks had collected only 11 turnovers its first eight games, but got five of them – four off Mississippi State quarterback Dak Prescott – to pull away in the second half. The Gamecocks (7–2, 5–2 SEC) got 20 points off the turnovers, including 10 in the third quarter as they went from a touchdown up to a 34–10 lead.

Shaw played quarterback just the way he always has – with an emphasis on results. He missed practice Monday and Tuesday with a virus and was not as sharp as usual. Still, the senior tied his career best with the four touchdown passes. He had scoring throws of 14 and 43 yards to Shaq Roland, 6 yards to Damiere Byrd and 4 yards to Jerell Adams to move to 23–5 as South Carolina's starting quarterback. Shaw can tie Todd Ellis' school record for victories when South Carolina plays Florida here in two weeks. Davis had 128 yards and became the Gamecocks' first 1,000-yard rusher since Marcus Lattimore ran for 1,197 yards his freshman season three years ago. South Carolina won its seventh in row over the Bulldogs (4–4, 1–3).

Prescott threw three interceptions – he had just three in seven games coming in – and had a fumble. He did have touchdown runs of 1 and 11 yards, upping his SEC-leading touchdown total to 12.

The Gamecocks got themselves back in the SEC Eastern Division hunt with last week's 27–24, double-overtime victory at then No. 5 Missouri. South Carolina's home streak is the second current longest in the country behind Michigan's 19 in a row.

=== #11 Texas A&M ===
Mississippi State at Texas A&M

Team	1	2	3	4	Total
Bulldogs	7	7	6	21	41
• Aggies	16	7	14	14	51

- Date: November 9
- Location: Kyle Field
  College Station, TX
- Game start: 2:30 p.m. CST
- Elapsed time: 3:53
- Game attendance: 88,504
- Game weather: 62 °F (17 °C), Partly Cloudy, winds E 6mph
- Referee: Ken Williamson
- TV announcers (CBS): Tim Brando, Aaron Taylor, and Kristina Akra

Scoring summary
1	5:45	TAMU	Malcome Kennedy 12-yard touchdown pass from Johnny Manziel, Josh Lambo kick good	TAMU 7–0
1	5:28	MSU	Josh Robinson 51-yard touchdown run, Evan Sobiesk kick good	Tie 7–7
1	1:28	TAMU	Team Safety	TAMU 9–7
1	0:11	TAMU	Travis Labhart 33-yard touchdown pass from Johnny Manziel, Josh Lambo kick good	TAMU 16–7
2	0:54	MSU	De'Runnya Wilson 3-yard touchdown pass Dak Prescott, Evan Sobiesk kick good	TAMU 16–14
2	0:16	TAMU	Travis Labhart 11-yard touchdown pass from Johnny Manziel, Josh Lambo kick good	TAMU 23–14
3	7:34	TAMU	Malcome Kennedy 21-yard touchdown pass from Johnny Manziel, Josh Lambo kick good	TAMU 30–14
3	0:44	MSU	LaDarius Perkins 12-yard touchdown pass from Dak Prescott, Dak Prescott pass intercepted	TAMU 30–20
3	0:12	TAMU	Trey 15-yard touchdown run, Josh Lambo kick good	TAMU 37–20
4	14:53	MSU	Joe Morrow 33-yard touchdown pass from Jameon Lewis, Evan Sobiesk kick good	TAMU 37–27
4	13:54	TAMU	Nehemiah Hicks 2-yard touchdown pass from Johnny Manziel, Josh Lambo kick good	TAMU 44–27
4	10:54	TAMU	Ben Malena 2-yard touchdown run, Josh Lambo kick good	TAMU 51–27
4	6:45	MSU	LaDarius Perkins 1-yard touchdown run, Dak Prescott rush	TAMU 51–35
4	2:19	MSU	De'Runnya Wilson 9-yard touchdown pass from Tyler Russell, Tyler Russell rush failed	TAMU 51–41

Johnny Manziel threw for 446 yards and tied a career-high with five touchdown passes to lead No. 15 Texas A&M to a 51–41 win over Mississippi State. The crowd chanted "one more year" late in the game for Manziel, who is eligible for the draft after this season. Whether he comes back remains to be seen, but he went into the stands to celebrate with the student section when the game was over. Manziel denied that he even has entertained the thought that he might not play here again. Among the crowd of 88,504, third largest ever at A&M, on hand to see Manziel play at Kyle Field for the possibly final time was former President George H.W. Bush and former Texas A&M and current St. Louis Cardinals pitcher Michael Wacha. Texas governor Rick Perry was the co-pilot in the pre-game flyover and also attended the game. Manziel set a school career record for total yards with 9,040 and a single-season record with 31 touchdown passes. He became just the second A&M quarterback to run for 2,000 yards in a career and has 3,313 yards passing this year to become the first Aggie with two 3,000-yard passing seasons.

Mississippi State cut the lead to 10 points early in the fourth quarter, but Manziel threw his fifth touchdown pass to make it 44–27 for A&M (8–2, 4–2 Southeastern Conference). The defense grabbed an interception and Ben Malena's 2-yard touchdown run extended the lead to 51–27. Dak Prescott threw for 149 yards and two scores and ran for 154 yards for Mississippi State (4–5, 1–4). Kennedy and Travis Labhart had two touchdown receptions each. Mike Evans had 116 yards receiving to break the school single-season record with 1,263.

Russell started the game in place of Prescott, who missed practice this week after his mother died of cancer on Sunday. Prescott entered the game on Mississippi State's third drive and got the majority of the snaps after that. Manziel evaded the rush and connected with Kennedy for a 21-yard touchdown to extend Texas A&M's lead to 30–14 in the third quarter. The Bulldogs cut the lead to 10 points late in the third quarter on a touchdown pass by Prescott. But A&M made it 37–20 two plays later on a 15-yard run by Williams. That scored was set up by a 75-yard reception by Evans.

The Bulldogs got within 10 points again after a touchdown throw by Tyler Russell with 2:19 remaining. But the onside kick was recovered by A&M. Bulldogs receiver Jameon Lewis threw a touchdown pass to Joe Morrow on a reverse early in the fourth quarter to get within 37–27. Trey Williams returned the ensuing kickoff 100 yards for a touchdown. But it was negated by an unsportsmanlike conduct penalty after he flipped into the end zone.

Manziel was intercepted three times, twice by Jamerson Love. The turnovers helped keep Mississippi State close, but the Bulldogs couldn't keep up.

=== #1 Alabama ===
Alabama at Mississippi State

Team	1	2	3	4	Total
• Crimson Tide	3	7	7	3	20
Bulldogs	0	0	7	0	7

- Date: November 16
- Location: Davis Wade Stadium
  Starkville, MS
- Game start: 6:45 p.m. CST
- Elapsed time: 3:06
- Game attendance: 57,211
- Game weather: 65 °F (18 °C), Clear skies, winds N 10mph
- Referee: Mark Curies
- TV announcers (ESPN): Brad Nessler, Todd Blackledge, and Holly Rowe

Scoring summary
1	7:59	UA	Cade Foster 33-yard kick good	UA 3–0
2	0:20	UA	Brian Vogler 18-yard touchdown pass from A. J. McCarron, Cade Foster kick good	UA 10–0
3	10:11	MSU	Charles Siddoway 0-yard fumble recovery, Evan Sobiesk kick good	UA 10–7
3	5:46	UA	Kevin Norwood 11-yard touchdown pass from A. J. McCarron, Cade Foster kick good	UA 17–7
4	12:15	UA	Cade Foster 35-yard kick good	UA 20–7

Alabama looked lethargic against Mississippi State, but still won by nearly two touchdowns. T. J. Yeldon rushed for 160 yards and A. J. McCarron threw two touchdown passes as Alabama overcame four turnovers to beat Mississippi State 20–7.

It was the lowest scoring game of the season for Alabama (10–0, 7–0 SEC), who led 10–7 midway through the third quarter before pulling away. Alabama has seemed invincible over the past two months, winning seven straight games by at least three touchdowns.

Mississippi State (4–6, 1–5) kept the game far closer than most anticipated, but couldn't take advantage of Alabama's mistakes. Tyler Russell started for the injured Dak Prescott and completed 15 of 24 passes for 144 yards and an interception before leaving with a shoulder injury when the Bulldogs were trying to rally in the fourth quarter. A.J. McCarron tossed two rare interceptions and Yeldon had a costly fumble that led to Mississippi State's only touchdown, but Alabama survived to set up a much-anticipated Iron Bowl with Auburn.

Mississippi State had two chances to get back into the game in the fourth quarter after McCarron's second interception and a fumble by Kenyan Drake gave the Bulldogs field position in Alabama territory. But without Russell, Mississippi State's offense went nowhere. Freshman Damian Williams didn't connect on any of his five pass attempts – though two of them were good passes that were dropped.

McCarron completed 18 of 32 passes. His first interception in the second quarter was his first in 139 pass attempts. It was the third 100-plus streak without an interception during his career. Alabama parlayed a methodical 14-play, 59-yard opening drive into Cade Foster's 33-yard field goal and a 3–0 lead. But the next four drives were brutal for the Crimson Tide's offense, which managed just two first downs during that span. Mississippi State tried to take advantage with a long drive midway through the second quarter, but it bogged down on the 7 and Evan Sobiesk missed a 24-yard field goal that could have tied the game. A few minutes later, the Tide finally broke through with Yeldon's 50-yard run down the sideline to Mississippi State's 28. McCarron hit Brian Vogler five plays later for an 18-yard touchdown pass with 20 seconds remaining in the second quarter to give Alabama a 10–0 halftime lead.

It looked like that would be all the breathing room Alabama needed, but the mistakes continued in the second half. Yeldon fumbled after a 10-yard run and Mississippi State's Beniquez Brown recovered at Alabama's 48. The Bulldogs then drove downfield and scored thanks to Russell's timely passes and a stroke of luck. Russell fumbled just short of a touchdown, but right tackle Charles Siddoway fell on the ball in the end zone to pull Mississippi State within 10–7. McCarron's 11-yard pass to Norwood pushed the Tide ahead 17–7 with 5:46 left in the third quarter. Alabama's defense held an opponent to seven points or less for the sixth time this season.

=== Arkansas ===
Mississippi State at Arkansas

Team	1	2	3	4	OT	Total
• Bulldogs	0	10	0	7	7	24
Razorbacks	7	3	7	0	0	17

- Date: November 23
- Location: War Memorial Stadium
  Little Rock, AR
- Game start: 11:21 a.m. CST
- Elapsed time: 3:18
- Game attendance: 45,198
- Game weather: 44 °F (7 °C), Cloudy, winds NNE 13mph
- Referee: Matt Moore
- TV announcers (SEC TV): Dave Neal (Play-by-play), Andre Ware (Color), Cara Capuano (Sideline)

Scoring summary
1	11:02	AR	Javontee Herndon 8-yard touchdown run, Zach Hocker kick good	AR 7–0
2	6:53	AR	Zach Hocker 54-yard kick good	AR 10–0
2	5:08	MSU	Devon Bell 24-yard kick good	AR 10–3
2	1:48	MSU	LaDarius Perkins 30-yard touchdown pass from Tyler Russell, Devon Bell kick good	Tie 10–10
3	3:28	AR	Julian Horton 22-yard touchdown run, Zach Hocker kick good	AR 17–10
4	13:35	MSU	Jameon Lewis 5-yard touchdown pass from Tyler Russell, Devon Bell kick good	Tie 17–17
OT		MSU	Damian Williams 25-yard touchdown run, Devon Bell kick good	MSU 24–17

Mississippi State finally got the best of Arkansas in an overtime game and in the state of Arkansas. True Freshman and third-string quarterback Damian Williams scored on a 25-yard touchdown run on the first play of overtime, and the Mississippi State defense made it stand, as the Bulldogs defeated Arkansas 24–17 on Saturday at War Memorial Stadium in Little Rock.

Mississippi State (5–6, 2–5 Southeastern Conference) got an interception by Taveze Calhoun on fourth down to seal the victory and keep its bowl hopes alive. Arkansas gained only one yard on its first three plays, and Calhoun stepped in front of the receiver and snared Brandon Allen's pass, returning it across midfield before being tackled. The Bulldogs lost to Arkansas in overtime contests in 1996, 2000 and 2010, all in Starkville, Miss., and had never defeated the Razorbacks in Arkansas. Mississippi State's best result in the Natural State was a 13–13 tie in 1993. Arkansas still leads the all-time series 15–8–1. The Bulldogs can become bowl eligible with a win over rival Ole Miss on Thanksgiving night in Starkville.

Mississippi State had a chance to win the game in regulation, but Devon Bell's 42-yard field goal drifted wide right with 24 seconds remaining. That came after Arkansas (3–8, 0–7) failed to cash in on its own chance to take the lead late in regulation. With the score tied 17–17, Allen passed to Jeremy Sprinkle for 44 yards to the Mississippi State 12. But Alex Collins fumbled on the next play, and Nickoe Whitley recovered for the Bulldogs at the Arkansas 9.

The Razorbacks took the opening kick and went 56 yards for a touchdown. After Korliss Marshall's kick return gave the Razorbacks a short field, they quickly moved into Mississippi State territory. Javontee Herndon scored, also on an end around, and Arkansas led 7–0. Zach Hocker added a career-best 54-yard field goal in the second quarter to make it 10–0. Arkansas led 10–0 in the first half, but was unable to maintain the lead and lost its eighth consecutive game for the first time in school history. The Bulldogs countered in the final minutes of the second quarter. Bell's 24-yard field goal got them on the scoreboard with 5:08 left. Russell then found LaDarius Perkins on a play action down the middle of the field for a 30-yard touchdown to pull the Bulldogs even.

After a first half that ended in a 10–10 tie, the Razorbacks took a 17–10 lead on a 22-yard run by Julian Horton in the third quarter on an end around. The Bulldogs answered immediately, covering 75 yards in 11 plays, as Tyler Russell connected with Jameon Lewis for a 5-yard touchdown on third down to knot the score. Russell completed 18 of 28 passes for 263 yards and two scores before leaving the game late in regulation with an apparent shoulder injury. Josh Robinson had 17 carries for 101 yards. Arkansas rushed for 225 yards as a team, spread out among nine ball carriers, but managed only 114 yards passing.

=== Mississippi ===
Ole Miss Rebels (7–4) at Mississippi State Bulldogs (5–6)

Quarter	1	2	3	4	OT	Total
Ole Miss	0	7	3	0	0	10
Mississippi St	0	7	0	3	7	17

at Davis Wade Stadium, Starkville, Mississippi

- Date: November 28, 2013
- Game time: 6:30 p.m. CST
- Game attendance: 55,113
- Referee: Marc Curles
- TV announcers (ESPN): Rece Davis, Jesse Palmer, David Pollack, and Maria Taylor
- Box Score

Game information

Second quarter

- MSU – Josh Robinson 1-yard run (Evan Sobiesk kick), 1:36. Mississippi St 7–0. Drive: 6 plays, 30 yards, 2:24.
- MISS – Blocked punt recovered by Collins Moore in end zone (Andrew Ritter kick), 0:26. Tie 7–7.

Third quarter

- MISS – Andrew Ritter 22-yard field goal, 9:54. Ole Miss 10–7. Drive: 17 plays, 81 yards, 4:59.

Fourth quarter

- MSU – Evan Sobiesk 36-yard field goal, 9:54. Tie 10–10. Drive: 13 plays, 59 yards, 4:47.

Overtime

- MSU – Dak Prescott 3-yard run (Evan Sobiesk kick). Mississippi St 17–10. Drive: 6 plays, 25 yards.

Top passers

- MISS – Bo Wallace – 26/40, 182 yards, 3 INT
- MSU – Dak Prescott – 11/20, 115 yards

Top rushers

- MISS – Jaylen Walton – 10 rushes, 37 yards
- MSU – Josh Robinson – 7 rushes, 38 yards, TD

Top receivers

- MISS – Laquon Treadwell – 9 receptions, 57 yards
- MSU – Jameon Lewis – 6 receptions, 68 yards

With Mississippi State's offense struggling and time slipping away in the Egg Bowl, coach Dan Mullen turned to Dak Prescott and asked him to win the game. Injured shoulder and all, the sophomore quarterback did just that, running for a 3-yard touchdown in overtime to lead the Bulldogs past rival Mississippi 17–10 on a chilly Thursday night at Davis Wade Stadium. Prescott didn't enter the game until the fourth quarter because of a nerve injury to his non-throwing arm that caused him to miss the previous two games. But the sophomore led the Bulldogs (6–6, 3–5 Southeastern Conference) to their tying drive in the fourth quarter and the game winner in overtime. Prescott completed 11 of 20 passes for 115 yards in a performance that will long be remembered in Egg Bowl lore. His game-winning touchdown came on a gutsy call by Mullen, who opted to go for it on fourth-and-1 at the 3 instead of kicking a short field goal. It was an emotional win for the Bulldogs and especially Prescott, whose mother died earlier this month after a yearlong battle with cancer.

Ole Miss had a chance to tie the game in overtime, but the drive ended when quarterback Bo Wallace fumbled and Mississippi State's Jamerson Love recovered the ball in the end zone. The Bulldogs are now bowl eligible for a fourth straight season, the longest streak in school history. Mississippi State has won four of the past five Egg Bowls and five in a row at Davis Wade Stadium.

Mississippi State Freshman Damian Williams, the third-string quarterback, made his first career start because of injuries to Prescott and Tyler Russell. He completed 8 of 18 passes for 82 yards and one interception. Both teams struggled to move the ball in the chilly conditions – especially through the air. The temperature hovered in the low 30s throughout the night, which is downright frigid by Magnolia State standards. Ole Miss (7–5, 3–5) didn't have an offensive touchdown, scoring only on a field goal and blocked punt in the end zone. The Rebels ended the regular season on a two-game losing streak. The Rebels had one good early drive but it ended with nothing after Andrew Ritter's 27-yard field goal attempt bounced off the left upright.

Wallace threw three interceptions before halftime, and the final one was costly. Mississippi State's Justin Cox grabbed it at the Ole Miss 30, and the Bulldogs' subsequent drive ended with Josh Robinson's 1-yard touchdown run for a 7–0 lead with 1:32 remaining in the second quarter. Ole Miss did nothing on its next possession and quickly punted back to Mississippi State, which looked as though it would ease into halftime with the lead. But a mistake on special teams hurt the Bulldogs when Collins Moore burst through the line and blocked Baker Swedenburg's punt after the snap was bobbled. It was recovered by little-used senior Terrell Grant in the end zone to tie the game at 7. Ole Miss grabbed the lead for the first time early in the third quarter after Ritter's 22-yard field goal gave the Rebels a 10–7 advantage. The points were certainly welcome for the Ole Miss offense, but it was the team's fifth straight trip to the red zone without a touchdown, dating back to last weekend's loss to Missouri.

That lack of efficiency came back to haunt the Rebels. Williams played decently for the Bulldogs and avoided any major mistakes, but with the offense struggling early in the fourth quarter, Mullen turned to Prescott. Mullen said earlier in the week that Prescott wouldn't play in the Egg Bowl, but he looked plenty healthy as he led the Bulldogs down the field on his second drive, completing several impressive passes. The drive ended with Sobiesk's 36-yard field goal to tie it at 10. Mississippi State received the ball one final time but Sobiesk missed a 38-yard field goal wide right at the end of regulation that would have won the game.

=== Rice ===
Rice vs Mississippi State

Team	1	2	3	4	Total
Rice	7	0	0	0	7
• Bulldogs	7	20	14	3	44

- Date: December 31
- Location: Liberty Bowl Memorial Stadium
  Memphis, TN
- Game start: 3:00 p.m. CST
- Elapsed time: 3:05
- Game attendance: 57,846
- Game weather: 47 °F (8 °C), Clear, winds S 7mph
- Referee: Ron Cherry
- TV announcers (ESPN): Bob Wischusen, Rod Gilmore and Quint Kessenich

Scoring summary
1	6:41	RICE	Ross Charles 1-yard touchdown run, Chris Boswell kick good	Rice 7–0
1	2:01	MSU	LaDarius Perkins 10-yard touchdown pass from Dak Prescott, Evan Sobiesk kick good	Tie 7–7
2	9:49	MSU	Ashton Shumpert 1-yard touchdown run, Evan Sobiesk kick good	MSU 14–7
2	4:32	MSU	Malcolm Johnson 13-yard touchdown pass from Dak Prescott, Evan Sobiesk kick blocked	MSU 20–7
2	0:10	MSU	Artimas Samuel 4-yard touchdown pass from Dak Prescott, Evan Sobiesk kick good	MSU 27–7
3	7:25	MSU	Dak Prescott 5-yard touchdown run, Evan Sobiesk kick good	MSU 34–7
3	1:42	MSU	Dak Prescott 11-yard touchdown run, Evan Sobiesk kick good	MSU 41–7
4	4:45	MSU	Taylor Earhart 19-yard kick good	MSU 44–7

Dak Prescott delivered a performance that would have made his mother proud and make him a dark-horse candidate for the Heisman Trophy in 2014. Prescott threw three touchdown passes and ran for two more scores Tuesday as Mississippi State trounced Rice 44–7 in the most one-sided AutoZone Liberty Bowl victory in the game's 55-year history in Memphis. The sophomore quarterback delivered arguably the finest performance of his career less than two months after his mother, Peggy, died of cancer.

Mississippi State (7–6) wrapped up its fourth straight winning season and prevented Rice (10–4) from winning bowl games in back-to-back years for the first time. All of Mississippi State's losses this season came against teams currently in the Top 25: No. 13 Oklahoma State, No. 2 Auburn, No. 14 LSU, No. 8 South Carolina, No. 20 Texas A&M and No. 3 Alabama. The Bulldogs became bowl eligible by closing the regular season with consecutive overtime victories over Arkansas and Ole Miss. This marks the first time since 1974 that Mississippi State has closed a season with three straight wins.

Nobody faced more adversity than Prescott, who set a Liberty Bowl record by accounting for five touchdowns. Prescott was 17 of 28 for 283 yards passing and also ran for 78 yards on 14 carries. Prescott's performance delighted a partisan crowd of 57,846 and capped a triumphant late-season performance amid personal tragedy for the sophomore quarterback. Prescott came off the bench in the fourth quarter to lead Mississippi State to a 17–10 overtime victory over Ole Miss last month that earned the Bulldogs a bowl bid. Although Prescott and senior Tyler Russell had shared quarterback duties throughout the regular season, Prescott had the job to himself in the Liberty Bowl while Russell recovered from surgery to repair a torn labrum in his throwing shoulder. Prescott responded better than anyone could have reasonably imagined.

Prescott wasn't Mississippi State's only star on a night when the Bulldogs outgained Rice 533–145 and scored the game's final 44 points. Mississippi State's Jameon Lewis caught nine passes for 220 yards to break the Liberty Bowl receiving record held by Houston's Vincent Marshall, who had 201 yards in a 44–36 loss to South Carolina in 2006. Lewis also set the school single-game record.

Not to forget, the Bulldogs also played dominant defense. Rice had won the Conference USA title – its first outright league championship of any kind since 1957 – by relying on a rushing attack that was ranked 16th among all Football Bowl Subdivision teams. Rice gained only 61 yards rushing – 179 below its season average – on 32 carries against Mississippi State. Charles Ross, who entered the day having rushed for 1,252 yards and 14 touchdowns this season, was held to 28 yards on 10 carries.

Rice took an early lead on Ross' 1-yard touchdown run, but Mississippi State took control by reaching the end zone on six of its next seven possessions. Prescott threw first-half touchdown passes to LaDarius Perkins, Malcolm Johnson and Artimus Samuel before running for two scores in the third quarter.

== Rankings ==
Ranking movements Legend: ██ Increase in ranking ██ Decrease in ranking — = Not ranked RV = Received votes
	Week																
Poll	Pre	1	2	3	4	5	6	7	8	9	10	11	12	13	14	15	Final
AP	—	—	—	—	—	—	—	—	—	—	—	—	—	—	—	—	RV
Coaches	RV	—	—	—	—	—	—	—	—	—	—	—	—	—	—	—	—
Harris	Not released							—	—	—	—	—	—	—	—	—	Not released
BCS	Not released								—	—	—	—	—	—	—	—	Not released

== Statistics ==
Passing statistics
Name	CMP	ATT	YDS	PCT	AVG	TD	INT
Dak Prescott	156	267	1,940	58.4	7.27	10	7
Tyler Russell	71	109	875	65.1	8.03	5	3
Damian Williams	23	47	279	48.9	5.94	0	2
Jameon Lewis	3	3	84	100.0	28.0	3	0

Rushing statistics
Name	CAR	YDS	AVG	LNG	TD
Dak Prescott	134	829	6.2	75	13
LaDarius Perkins	137	542	4.0	35	2
Josh Robinson	78	459	5.9	51	3
Ashton Shumpert	46	190	4.1	14	3
Jameon Lewis	13	117	9.0	44	3
Damian Williams	37	112	3.0	25	1
Nick Griffin	24	96	4.0	10	1
Derrick Milton	13	69	5.3	14	2

Receiving statistics
Name	REC	YDS	AVG	LNG	TD
Jameon Lewis	64	923	14.4	65	5
Malcolm Johnson	30	391	13.0	60	2
Robert Johnson	34	389	11.4	61	0
De'Runnya Wilson	26	351	13.5	59	3
LaDarius Perkins	27	248	9.2	32	3
Joe Morrow	18	211	11.7	31	1
Josh Robinson	12	115	12.8	23	0
Fred Ross	9	115	12.8	23	0
Brandon Holloway	7	77	11.0	34	0
Fred Brown	5	74	14.8	19	0
Dak Prescott	2	53	26.5	36	2

Kicking statistics
Name	XPM	XPA	FGM	FGA	PCT	LNG	PTS
Devon Bell	25	26	6	14	42.9	40	43
Evan Sobiesk	15	16	3	6	50.0	38	24

Punting statistics
Name	ATT	YDS	AVG	LNG	I-20
Blake Swedenberg	25	1,063	42.4	53	6
Devon Bell	24	990	41.2	62	14

Kick return statistics
Name	ATT	YDS	AVG	TD	LNG
Jameon Lewis	19	446	23.5	0	66
Robert Johnson	4	41	10.2	0	19
Brandon Holloway	3	113	37.7	0	95
Chris Harrison	1	7	7.0	0	7

Punt return statistics
Name	ATT	YDS	AVG	TD	LNG
Jameon Lewis	22	51	2.3	0	16
Brandon Holloway	2	36	18.0	0	23

Defensive statistics
Name	SOLO	AST	TKL	TFL	SACKS	INT	FUM
Brandon McKinney	42	29	71	7	3.5	0	2
Deontae Skinner	33	31	64	4.5	1	1	0
Kendrick Market	43	19	62	1.5	0	0	0
Nikoe Whitley	38	17	55	1	0	5	1
Matthew Wells	28	22	50	6	1	0	2
Taveze Calhoun	33	12	45	1.5	0	3	1
Preston Smith	29	15	44	6.5	2.5	0	0
Beniquez Brown	16	23	39	4.5	0	0	2
Richie Brown	16	22	38	3	2	1	0
Zach Jackson	16	17	33	2.5	0	0	0
Chris Jones	17	15	32	7	3	0	0
Denico Autry	14	17	31	6.5	2	0	0
Justin Cox	23	8	31	0.5	0	1	0
Jamerson Love	22	5	27	1	0	3	1
Kaleb Eulls	9	17	26	1.5	0	0	0
P.J. Jones	9	16	25	3	1	0	0
Will Redmond	14	9	23	2.5	0	0	0
Cedric Jiles	14	6	20	0	0	0	0
Deontay Evans	11	8	19	0	0	0	0
A.J. Jefferson	12	7	19	4	2	0	0
