= 2013 Texas A&M Aggies football team =

American college football season

2013 Texas A&M Aggies football

Chick-fil-A Bowl champion

Chick-fil-A Bowl, W 52–48 vs. Duke
- Conference: Southeastern Conference
- Western Division

Ranking
- Coaches: No. 18
- AP: No. 18
- Record: 9–4 (4–4 SEC)
- Head coach: Kevin Sumlin (2nd season)
- Offensive coordinator: Clarence McKinney (1st season)
- Co-offensive coordinator: Jake Spavital (1st season)
- Offensive scheme: Spread
- Defensive coordinator: Mark Snyder (2nd season)
- Co-defensive coordinator: Marcel Yates (2nd season)
- Base defense: Multiple 4–3
- Home stadium: Kyle Field

2013 Southeastern Conference football standings
	Conf.			Overall
Team	W		L	W		L
Eastern Division
No. 5 Missouri x	7	–	1	12	–	2
No. 4 South Carolina	6	–	2	11	–	2
Georgia	5	–	3	8	–	5
No. 24 Vanderbilt	4	–	4	9	–	4
Florida	3	–	5	4	–	8
Tennessee	2	–	6	5	–	7
Kentucky	0	–	8	2	–	10
Western Division
No. 2 Auburn xy$	7	–	1	12	–	2
No. 7 Alabama x%	7	–	1	11	–	2
No. 14 LSU *	5	–	3	10	–	3
No. 18 Texas A&M	4	–	4	9	–	4
Mississippi State	3	–	5	7	–	6
Ole Miss *	3	–	5	8	–	5
Arkansas	0	–	8	3	–	9
Championship: Auburn 59, Missouri 42
$ – BCS representative as conference champion; % – BCS at-large representative; x – Division champion/co-champions; y – Championship game participant; * LSU and Ole Miss vacated all wins (except for Ole Miss' Music City Bowl win) due to NCAA violations.; Rankings from AP Poll

The 2013 Texas A&M Aggies football team represented Texas A&M University in the 2013 NCAA Division I FBS football season. They played their home games at Kyle Field and their head coach was Kevin Sumlin.

Texas A&M played 8 games at Kyle Field during the 2013 season. The last time Texas A&M played 8 games at home was 1919 when the Aggies were awarded the National Championship after finishing the season undefeated and unscored upon.

The 2013 season featured the defending national champion Alabama Crimson Tide playing at Kyle Field in what was CBS' first game from that venue since 1989.

== Before the season ==
=== Previous season ===
In 2012, Texas A&M played their first season in the SEC. They started out unranked and lost their opener to No. 24 Florida. However, the Aggies bounced back and went on a five-game win streak, including victories over two SEC West teams – Arkansas and Ole Miss – and a win over No. 23 Louisiana Tech. They fell to No. 6 LSU in a close home game before winning their final five regular-season games, highlighted by an upset victory over the defending national champion, No. 1 Alabama in Tuscaloosa. The streak also included a victory over No. 17 Mississippi State. The 2012 season saw the rise of quarterback Johnny Manziel, who went on to win the 2012 Heisman Trophy as the first freshman ever to do so. The Aggies accepted an invitation to the 2013 Cotton Bowl Classic, in which they definitively handled old Big XII rival Oklahoma 41–13, and finished the season 11–2.

=== 2013 NFL draft ===
Five Texas A&M players were drafted in the 2013 NFL draft.

2013 NFL Draft selections
Round	Pick no.	Team	Player	Position
1	2	Jacksonville Jaguars	Luke Joeckel	Offensive tackle
2	62	Seattle Seahawks	Christine Michael	Running back
3	81	New York Giants	Damontre Moore	Defensive end
4	118	Cincinnati Bengals	Sean Porter	Linebacker
6	174	Arizona Cardinals	Ryan Swope	Wide receiver

After the draft, seven Aggies were signed as undrafted free agents.

Signed as undrafted free agent
Player	Team	Position
Patrick Lewis	Green Bay Packers	Center
Spencer Nealy	New York Jets	Defensive tackle
Uzoma Nwachukwu	Houston Texans	Wide receiver
Dustin Harris	Dallas Cowboys	Defensive back
Steven Terrell	Jacksonville Jaguars	Defensive back
C.J. Jones	Kansas City Chiefs	Defensive back
Jonathan Stewart	St. Louis Rams	Linebacker

=== Spring practice ===
Spring practice began on March 1 and ended with the annual Maroon and White game on April 13, which was televised nationally on ESPN. It also included an open scrimmage on March 23 and the Friday Night Lights game on April 5. A few key players were out with injuries: junior WR Malcome Kennedy, senior LB Steven Jenkins, sophomore DE Julien Obioha, and senior DL Kirby Ennis.

Throughout the spring, A&M saw great play out of its receivers (especially Mike Evans), the offensive line, led by senior LT Jake Matthews, and quarterbacks group, led by the all-star talent of Johnny Manziel. The running backs group looked loaded with talent and depth (including senior Ben Malena and sophomores Trey Williams, Tra Carson, and Brandon Williams) and looked to be a position of strength for the Aggies as well. The defensive backfield also seemed to have a few playmakers in CB Deshazor Everett and S Floyd Raven Sr. The linebacking corps, however, showed a lack of depth, especially without Senior Steven Jenkins, and was projected as an area of concern for the Aggies in the coming season. Another area of potential issue for A&M was the defensive line, as there was little depth (compounded by injuries) and a thus much riding on incoming freshmen that couldn't practice in the spring.

In the Maroon and White game, the Maroon (offense) prevailed over the White (defense) 43–23. For the quarterbacks, Manziel went 23-of-30 for 303 yards and three touchdowns, Matt Joeckel went 8-of-21 for 88 yards, and Matt Davis went 7-of-12 for 112 yards. Ben Malena played little (only 3 carries for 12 yards), so the team was led by sophomores Brandon Williams (7 for 59 yards and 1 TD) and Trey Williams (7 for 67 yards and 1 TD). Mike Evans had a solid game receiving with 5 catches for 73 yards, as did Derel Walker (5 for 79 yards and 1 TD) and LaKendrick Williams (7 for 105 yards). As for the defense, sacks were made by Nate Askew, Tyrone Taylor, Jordan Points, and Tyrell Taylor (who had 2).

=== Fall practice ===
Fall camp began on August 5 and concluded on August 25. It also included an open scrimmage on August 17 and Meet the Aggies Day on August 24. Several freshmen stood out during the camp, including receivers Ricky Seals-Jones and LaQuvionte Gonzalez; linebackers Darian Claiborne and Jordan Mastrogiovanni; defensive linemen Isaiah Golden, Daeshon Hall, and Hardreck Walker.

=== Predictions ===
Five editors from Athlon Sports and Stewart Mandel of SI.com predicted Texas A&M to finish 10–2. The SEC media projected A&M to finish second in the SEC West, behind Alabama.

== Personnel ==
=== Roster ===
2013 Texas A&M Aggies football team roster
Players
Coaches
Offense

Pos.	#	Name	Class
RB	1	Ben Malena (C)	Sr
QB	2	Johnny Manziel	So
RB	3	Trey Williams	So
WR	4	Ja’Quay Williams	Fr
RB	5	Brandon Williams	So
WR	6	LaQuvionte Gonzalez	Fr
QB	7	Kenny Hill	Fr
WR	9	Ricky Seals-Jones (injured)	Fr
WR	10	LeKendrick Williams	Jr
WR	11	Derel Walker	Sr
WR	13	Mike Evans (C)	So
QB	14	Conner McQueen	Fr
WR	15	Travis Labhart	Sr
QB	16	Matt Joeckel	Jr
WR	18	Edward Pope	Fr
QB	19	Conner Feist	Fr
WR	19	Jeremy Tabuyo	Fr
RB	20	James White	Fr
RB	21	Tra Carson	So
RB	23	Sabian Holmes	So
RB	27	Brice Dolezal	So
QB	33	Ace Fierro	Jr
RB	34	Blaine Townsend	So
WR	35	Reece Fierro	Jr
WR	42	Ryan Buscha	Jr
OL	47	Caden Smith	So
OL	51	Jarvis Harrison	Jr
OL	56	Mike Matthews	So
OL	63	Ryan Lindblade	Fr
OL	64	Trey Parker	Fr
OL	65	John-Albert Arechiga	So
OL	68	Ben Compton	Jr
OL	69	Ishmael Wilson	Fr
OL	70	Cedric Ogbuehi	Jr
OL	71	Kimo Tipoti	Fr
OL	73	Jeremiah Stuckey (I)	So
OL	74	Germain Ifedi	Fr
OL	75	Jake Matthews (C)	Sr
OL	76	Joas Aguilar	Fr
OL	77	Shep Klinke	Sr
OL	78	Garrett Gramling	Jr
OL	79	Joseph Cheek	So
TE	81	Nehemiah Hicks	Sr
WR	82	Boone Niederhofer	Fr
WR	83	Sebastian Larue	Fr
WR	84	Malcome Kennedy	Jr
TE	85	Cameron Clear	Jr
WR	86	Samuel McSwain	Fr
WR	88	Gaston Lamascus	Sr

Defense

Pos.	#	Name	Class
DB	1	De'Vante Harris	So
LB	3	Tommy Sanders	Jr
DB	4	Toney Hurd Jr. (C)	Sr
DB	5	Floyd Raven Sr.	Jr
DB	6	Noel Ellis	Fr
DB	7	Tramain Jacobs	Sr
LB	8	Steven Jenkins	Sr
LB	9	Nate Askew	Sr
DL	10	Daeshon Hall	Fr
LB	13	Reggie Chevis	Fr
DB	15	Kenneth Marshall	Fr
LB	16	Donnie Baggs	Jr
DB	19	Matt Fritsche	So
DB	22	Tavares Garner	Fr
DB	23	Kameron Miles	Fr
DB	25	Clay Honeycutt	Jr
DB	26	Devonta Burns	So
DB	27	Shane Huhn (I)	So
DB	28	Victor Davis	Fr
DB	29	Deshazor Everett	Jr
DB	31	Howard Matthews	Jr
LB	33	Shaan Washington	Fr
LB	35	Tyrell Taylor	Jr
DB	36	Jonathan Wiggins	Fr
DB	37	Alex Sezer Jr.	Fr
DB	38	Matthew Coleman	Fr
DB	39	Marvin Taylor III	Fr
LB	40	Shaun Ward	Jr
DL	41	Brandon Alexander	So
DL	42	Kirby Ennis	Sr
LB	43	Justin Bass	Jr
DB	44	Sam Moeller	So
LB	45	Jordan Mastrogiovanni	Fr
LB	46	A.J. Hilliard (I)	So
LB	48	Darian Claiborne	Fr
LB	49	Taylor Martinez	Fr
LB	50	Tyrone Taylor	Fr
LB	52	Brett Wade	Fr
LB	54	Corey Meador	Fr
DL	55	Justin Manning	Fr
LB	56	Nick Cobb	Fr
LB	57	Alvin Munrose	Fr
LB	58	Cody Johnson	So
DL	59	Isaac Flores	Fr
DL	67	Tyler Godwin	Fr
DL	72	Gavin Stansbury	Jr
DL	83	Alonzo Williams	So
DL	89	Ivan Robinson	Jr
DL	92	Jordan Points	Fr
DL	93	Ben Huckinson	Fr
DL	94	Tanner Schorp	Fr
DL	95	Julien Obioha	So
DL	96	Jay Arnold	Fr
DL	98	Hardreck Walker	Fr
DL	99	Isaiah Golden	Fr

Special teams

Pos.	#	Name	Class
PK	24	Taylor Bertolet	So
P	38	Drew Kaser	So
DS	39	Daniel Havens	Fr
PK	40	Kyle Serres	Sr
P	46	Shane Tripucka	Fr
PK	49	Josh Lambo	So
DS	54	Alex Freeman	Jr
PK	97	Cody Wicker	Fr

Head coach

- Kevin Sumlin (2nd season)

Coordinators/assistant coaches

- Scott Aligo – Defensive Graduate Assistant
- B.J. Anderson – Offensive line
- Jeff Banks – Special teams coordinator/tight ends
- David Beaty – Wide receivers/recruiting coordinator
- Bryan Cummings – Special Teams Quality Control
- Mark Hagen – Linebackers
- Larry Jackson – Director of Football Sports Performance
- Scott Johnston – Director of Recruiting
- Clarence McKinney – Offensive coordinator/running backs
- Justin Moore – Associate athletic director for football
- Terry Price – Defensive line
- Nathan Reeves – Offensive quality control
- Gary Reynolds – Director of football operations
- Mark Snyder – Defensive coordinator
- Jake Spavital – Quarterbacks
- Marcel Yates – Co-defensive coordinator/secondary

Legend

- (C) Team captain
- (S) Suspended
- (I) Ineligible
- Injured
- Redshirt

Roster
Last update: May 16, 2014

=== Recruiting class ===
In the 2013 recruiting class, Texas A&M signed 32 players (31 not counting TCU transfer A.J. Hilliard), 10 of which were included in the ESPN 300, with 5 of those in the ESPN 150. The class was ranked 8th in the nation by ESPN, 11th by Rivals, and 6th nationally by Scout.

College recruiting (2013)
Name	Hometown	School	Height	Weight	40^{‡}	Commit date
Joas Aguilar; OL	North Richland Hills, TX	Birdville HS	6 ft 5 in (1.96 m)	295 lb (134 kg)	5.30	Feb 18, 2012
Joas Aguilar; OL	Recruit ratings: Scout: Rivals: (83)					
Jay Arnold; DE	Heath, TX	Rockwall-Heath HS	6 ft 4 in (1.93 m)	245 lb (111 kg)	–	Apr 9, 2012
Jay Arnold; DE	Recruit ratings: Scout: Rivals: (80)					
Reggie Chevis; LB	Houston, TX	Sharpstown HS	6 ft 2 in (1.88 m)	235 lb (107 kg)	4.65	Jun 12, 2012
Reggie Chevis; LB	Recruit ratings: Scout: Rivals: (80)					
Darian Claiborne; LB	Port Allen, LA	Port Allen HS	6 ft 1 in (1.85 m)	220 lb (100 kg)	4.60	Jul 3, 2012
Darian Claiborne; LB	Recruit ratings: Scout: Rivals: (77)					
Cameron Clear; TE	Yuma, AZ	Arizona Western CC	6 ft 6 in (1.98 m)	285 lb (129 kg)	–	Nov 27, 2012
Cameron Clear; TE	Recruit ratings: Scout: Rivals: (78)					
Victor Davis; S	Rosenberg, TX	Terry HS	6 ft 1 in (1.85 m)	180 lb (82 kg)	4.55	Feb 18, 2012
Victor Davis; S	Recruit ratings: Scout: Rivals: (80)					
Noel Ellis; CB	New Orleans, LA	Edna Karr HS	5 ft 10 in (1.78 m)	170 lb (77 kg)	4.60	Jun 14, 2012
Noel Ellis; CB	Recruit ratings: Scout: Rivals: (83)					
Tavares Garner; CB	Manvel, TX	Manvel HS	5 ft 10 in (1.78 m)	170 lb (77 kg)	4.66	Jun 14, 2012
Tavares Garner; CB	Recruit ratings: Scout: Rivals: (77)					
Isaiah Golden; DT	Carthage, TX	Carthage HS	6 ft 2 in (1.88 m)	300 lb (140 kg)	4.86	Jan 28, 2012
Isaiah Golden; DT	Recruit ratings: Scout: Rivals: (83)					
Laquvionte Gonzalez; ATH	Cedar Hill, TX	Cedar Hill HS	5 ft 10 in (1.78 m)	160 lb (73 kg)	4.56	Mar 8, 2012
Laquvionte Gonzalez; ATH	Recruit ratings: Scout: Rivals: (84)					
Daeshon Hall; DE	Lancaster, TX	Lancaster HS	6 ft 6 in (1.98 m)	230 lb (100 kg)	–	Feb 6, 2013
Daeshon Hall; DE	Recruit ratings: Scout: Rivals: (80)					
Kenny Hill; QB	Southlake, TX	Carroll HS	6 ft 1 in (1.85 m)	205 lb (93 kg)	–	Apr 29, 2012
Kenny Hill; QB	Recruit ratings: Scout: Rivals: (78)					
A.J. Hilliard; LB	Spring, TX	TCU (Transfer)	6 ft 2 in (1.88 m)	210 lb (95 kg)	4.63	Feb 6, 2013
A.J. Hilliard; LB	Recruit ratings: Scout: Rivals: (78)					
Sebastian LaRue; WR	Santa Monica, CA	Santa Monica HS	5 ft 11 in (1.80 m)	180 lb (82 kg)	–	Jan 25, 2013
Sebastian LaRue; WR	Recruit ratings: Scout: Rivals: (85)					
Justin Manning; DT	Dallas, TX	Justin F. Kimball HS	6 ft 2 in (1.88 m)	275 lb (125 kg)	5.03	Dec 6, 2012
Justin Manning; DT	Recruit ratings: Scout: Rivals: (84)					
Jordan Mastrogiovanni; LB	Dallas, TX	Jesuit HS (Dallas)	6 ft 2 in (1.88 m)	225 lb (102 kg)	4.90	Jan 6, 2013
Jordan Mastrogiovanni; LB	Recruit ratings: Scout: Rivals: (83)					
Kameron Miles; S	Mesquite, TX	West Mesquite HS	6 ft 2 in (1.88 m)	205 lb (93 kg)	4.50	Nov 15, 2012
Kameron Miles; S	Recruit ratings: Scout: Rivals: (82)					
Kyrion Parker; WR	Manvel, TX	Manvel HS	6 ft 2 in (1.88 m)	192 lb (87 kg)	4.71	Jun 25, 2012
Kyrion Parker; WR	Recruit ratings: Scout: Rivals: (77)					
Jordan Points; DT	Heath, TX	Rockwall-Heath HS	6 ft 4 in (1.93 m)	255 lb (116 kg)	4.90	May 24, 2012
Jordan Points; DT	Recruit ratings: Scout: Rivals: (75)					
Tommy Sanders; LB	Cordele, GA	Butler CC	6 ft 2 in (1.88 m)	215 lb (98 kg)	4.45	Dec 19, 2012
Tommy Sanders; LB	Recruit ratings: Scout: Rivals: (80)					
Ricky Seals-Jones; WR	Sealy, TX	Sealy HS	6 ft 5 in (1.96 m)	230 lb (100 kg)	4.60	Dec 10, 2012
Ricky Seals-Jones; WR	Recruit ratings: Scout: Rivals: (85)					
Alex Sezer; RB	Orange, TX	Little Cypress-Mauriceville HS	5 ft 10 in (1.78 m)	170 lb (77 kg)	4.40	Jun 17, 2012
Alex Sezer; RB	Recruit ratings: Scout: Rivals: (77)					
Kohl Stewart; QB	Houston, TX	St. Pius X HS	6 ft 2 in (1.88 m)	190 lb (86 kg)	–	Jul 23, 2011
Kohl Stewart; QB	Recruit ratings: Scout: Rivals: (84)					
Jeremiah Stuckey; OL	San Francisco, CA	City College of San Francisco (JC)	6 ft 7 in (2.01 m)	285 lb (129 kg)	–	Nov 18, 2012
Jeremiah Stuckey; OL	Recruit ratings: Scout: Rivals: (76)					
Jeremy Tabuyo; WR	Honolulu, HI	Saint Louis School	6 ft 2 in (1.88 m)	184 lb (83 kg)	4.46	Jul 25, 2012
Jeremy Tabuyo; WR	Recruit ratings: Scout: Rivals: (70)					
Hardreck Walker; DT	Houston, TX	Westfield HS	6 ft 2 in (1.88 m)	281 lb (127 kg)	5.15	Jul 1, 2012
Hardreck Walker; DT	Recruit ratings: Scout: Rivals: (78)					
Shaan Washington; S	Alexandria, LA	Alexandria Senior HS	6 ft 3 in (1.91 m)	210 lb (95 kg)	–	Jul 24, 2012
Shaan Washington; S	Recruit ratings: Scout: Rivals: (73)					
James White; RB	Pearland, TX	Glenda Dawson HS	6 ft 0 in (1.83 m)	190 lb (86 kg)	4.50	Feb 19, 2012
James White; RB	Recruit ratings: Scout: Rivals: (77)					
Jonathan Wiggins; S	Houston, TX	Alief Taylor HS	6 ft 2 in (1.88 m)	195 lb (88 kg)	4.76	Feb 19, 2012
Jonathan Wiggins; S	Recruit ratings: Scout: Rivals: (77)					
Ja'Quay Williams; WR	Tyrone, GA	Fork Union Military Academy	6 ft 3 in (1.91 m)	200 lb (91 kg)	4.50	Dec 3, 2012
Ja'Quay Williams; WR	Recruit ratings: Scout: Rivals: (82)					
Ishmael Wilson; OL	Dallas, TX	Bishop Dunne HS	6 ft 5 in (1.96 m)	280 lb (130 kg)	5.00	Feb 18, 2012
Ishmael Wilson; OL	Recruit ratings: Scout: Rivals: (79)					
Overall recruit ranking: Scout: 6 Rivals: 11 ESPN: 8
‡ Refers to 40-yard dash; Note: In many cases, Scout, Rivals, 247Sports, On3, and ESPN may conflict in their listings of height, weight and 40 time.; In these cases, the average was taken. ESPN grades are on a 100-point scale.; Sources: "Texas A&M Football Commitment List 2013". Rivals.; "Texas A&M College Football Recruiting Commits 2013". Scout.; "Texas A&M Aggies Commits 2013". ESPN.; "Scout.com Team Recruiting Rankings". Scout.; "2013 Team Ranking". Rivals.com.

=== Returning starters ===
Offense
Player	Class	Position
Johnny Manziel	Sophomore (RS)	Quarterback
Ben Malena	Senior	Running Back
Mike Evans	Sophomore (RS)	Wide Receiver
Jake Matthews	Senior	Left Tackle
Jarvis Harrison	Junior (RS)	Left Guard
Cedric Ogbuehi	Junior (RS)	Right Tackle

Defense
Player	Class	Position
Julien Obioha	Sophomore	Defensive End
Deshazor Everett	Junior	Defensive Back
Howard Matthews	Junior	Safety
Steven Jenkins	Senior	Linebacker

Special Teams
Player	Class	Position
Taylor Bertolet	Sophomore (RS)	Kicker (Kickoffs)
Jake Matthews	Senior	Long Snapper
Trey Williams	Sophomore	Kick return

=== Depth chart ===
Defense

FS
Floyd Raven Sr
Clay Honeycut

WLB	Mike	SLB
⋅	Darian Claiborne	⋅
Tommy Sanders	Jordan Mastrogiovanni	⋅

BS
Howard Matthews
Jonathan Wiggins

CB
De'Vante Harris
Alex Sezer Jr

DE	DT	DT	DE
Julien Obioha	Isaiah Golden	Ivan Robinson	Gavin Stansbury
Daeshon Hall	Hardreck Walker	Alonzo Williams	Tyrone Taylor

CB
Deshazor Everett
Tramain Jacobs

Offense

WR
Derel Walker
Edward Pope

WR
Travis Labhart
Sabian Holmes/LaQuvionte Gonzalez

LT	LG	C	RG	RT
Jake Matthews	Jarvis Harrison	Mike Matthews	Germain Ifedi	Cedric Ogbuehi
Jeremiah Stuckey	Shep Klinke	Ben Compton	Garrett Gramling	Joseph Cheek

WR
Malcome Kennedy
Jeremy Tabuyo

WR
Mike Evans
JaQuay Williams

QB
Johnny Manziel
Matt Joeckel

RB
Ben Malena
Trey Williams

Special teams
PK Josh Lambo
PK Taylor Bertolet
P Drew Kaser
P Shane Tripucka
KR Trey Williams
PR De’Vante Harris
LS Jake Matthews
H Drew Kaser

== Schedule ==
Texas A&M's 2013 schedule was released by the Southeastern Conference and Texas A&M on October 18, 2012.

Date	Time	Opponent	Rank	Site	TV	Result	Attendance
August 31	12:00 p.m.	Rice*	No. 7	Kyle Field; College Station, TX	ESPN	W 52–31	86,686
September 7	6:00 p.m.	No. 4 (FCS) Sam Houston State*	No. 7	Kyle Field; College Station, TX	FSSW PPV	W 65–28	86,800
September 14	2:30 p.m.	No. 1 Alabama	No. 6	Kyle Field; College Station, TX (College GameDay)	CBS	L 42–49	87,596
September 21	6:00 p.m.	SMU*	No. 10	Kyle Field; College Station, TX	ESPNU	W 42–13	86,542
September 28	6:00 p.m.	at Arkansas	No. 10	Donald W. Reynolds Razorback Stadium; Fayetteville, AR (Southwest Classic)	ESPN2	W 45–33	72,613
October 12	7:30 p.m.	at Ole Miss	No. 9	Vaught–Hemingway Stadium; Oxford, MS	ESPN	W 41–38	60,950
October 19	2:30 p.m.	No. 24 Auburn	No. 7	Kyle Field; College Station, TX	CBS	L 41–45	87,165
October 26	11:21 a.m.	Vanderbilt	No. 14	Kyle Field; College Station, TX	SECTV	W 56–24	86,584
November 2	8:00 p.m.	UTEP*	No. 12	Kyle Field; College Station, TX	ESPN2	W 57–7	87,126
November 9	2:30 p.m.	Mississippi State	No. 11	Kyle Field; College Station, TX	CBS	W 51–41	88,504
November 23	2:30 p.m.	at No. 18 LSU	No. 9	Tiger Stadium; Baton Rouge, LA (rivalry)	CBS	L 10–34	92,949
November 30	6:45 p.m.	at No. 5 Missouri	No. 19	Faurot Field; Columbia, MO	ESPN	L 21–28	67,124
December 31	7:00 p.m.	vs. No. 22 Duke*	No. 20	Georgia Dome; Atlanta, GA (Chick-fil-A Bowl)	ESPN	W 52–48	67,496
*Non-conference game; Rankings from AP Poll released prior to the game; All times are in Central time

== Coaching staff ==
Name	Position	Season at Texas A&M
Kevin Sumlin	Head coach	2nd
Mark Snyder	Defensive coordinator and linebackers coach	2nd
Marcel Yates	Co-defensive coordinator and defensive backs coach	2nd
Terry Price	Defensive line coach	2nd
Mark Hagen	Linebackers coach	1st
Jake Spavital	Co-offensive coordinator and quarterbacks coach	1st
Clarence McKinney	Co-offensive coordinator and running backs coach	2nd
David Beaty	Wide receivers coach	2nd
B.J. Anderson	Offensive line coach	2nd
Jeff Banks	Special teams coordinator and tight ends coach	1st
Larry Jackson	Director of football sports performance	2nd

== Rankings ==
Ranking movements Legend: ██ Increase in ranking ██ Decrease in ranking ( ) = First-place votes
	Week																
Poll	Pre	1	2	3	4	5	6	7	8	9	10	11	12	13	14	15	Final
AP	7	7	6	10	10	9	9	7	14	12	11	10	9	19	22	20	18
Coaches	6 (1)	7 (1)	6 (1)	9	9	9	9	7	15	14	13	11	10	21	25	21	18
Harris	Not released							7	13	13	12	10	10	21	23	21	Not released
BCS	Not released								16	12	15	11	12	21	24	21	Not released

== Game summaries ==
=== Rice ===
Team	1	2	3	4	Total
Owls	14	7	0	10	31
• No. 7 Aggies	7	21	10	14	52

- Date: August 31
- Location: Kyle Field
  College Station, Texas
- Game start: 12:02 p.m. CST
- Elapsed time: 3:32
- Game attendance: 86,686
- Game weather: 90 °F (32 °C), Clear and Humid, winds S at 6 mph
- Referee: Matt Austin
- TV announcers (ESPN): Dave Pasch, Brian Griese, & Tom Luginbill
- Sources:
- Official Texas A&M Game Notes (PDF)

Scoring summary
1	11:38	Rice	Charles Ross 1 Yd Run (Chris Boswell Kick)	Rice 7–0
1	8:56	TAMU	Ben Malena 4 Yd Run (Taylor Bertolet Kick)	Tied 7–7
1	7:00	Rice	Charles Ross 19 Yd Pass From Taylor McHargue (Chris Boswell Kick)	Rice 14–7
2	13:52	TAMU	Tra Carson 1 Yd Run (Taylor Bertolet Kick)	Tied 14–14
2	9:32	TAMU	Ricky Seals-Jones 71 Yd Pass From Matt Joeckel (Taylor Bertolet Kick)	TAMU 21–14
2	3:42	TAMU	Tra Carson 2 Yd Run (Taylor Bertolet Kick)	TAMU 28–14
2	0:10	Rice	Jordan Taylor 5 Yd Pass From Taylor McHargue (Chris Boswell Kick)	TAMU 28–21
3	12:53	TAMU	Taylor Bertolet 44 Yd FG	TAMU 31–21
3	9:43	TAMU	Mike Evans 23 Yd Pass From Johnny Manziel (Taylor Bertolet Kick)	TAMU 38–21
4	14:56	Rice	Charles Ross 1 Yd Run (Chris Boswell Kick)	TAMU 38–28
4	13:10	TAMU	Ben Malena 18 Yd Pass From Johnny Manziel (Taylor Bertolet Kick)	TAMU 45–28
4	9:48	TAMU	Mike Evans 9 Yd Pass From Johnny Manziel (Taylor Bertolet Kick)	TAMU 52–28
4	2:09	Rice	Chris Boswell 43 Yd FG	TAMU 52–31

Statistics	RICE	TAMU
First downs	28	25
Total yards	509	486
Rushing yards	306	202
Passing yards	203	284
Turnovers	2	1
Time of possession	38:24	21:36

Team	Category	Player	Statistics
Rice	Passing	Taylor McHargue	18/29, 180 yards, 2 TD, 2 INT
Rice	Rushing	Charles Ross	19 rushes, 107 yards, 2 TD
Rice	Receiving	Jordan Taylor	7 receptions, 68 yards, TD
Texas A&M	Passing	Matt Joeckel	14/19, 190 yards, TD
Texas A&M	Rushing	Ben Malena	12 rushes, 82 yards, TD
Texas A&M	Receiving	Mike Evans	6 receptions, 84 yards, 2 TD

Eight total players were suspended for half or all of the game, including six defensive starters and Johnny Manziel. Freshman (RS) WR Edward Pope, Senior LB Steven Jenkins, Sophomore CB De'Vante Harris, and Junior DE Gavin Stansbury were suspended for two games. Senior DT Kirby Ennis and Junior S Floyd Raven Sr. were suspended for one game. Junior CB Deshazor Everett and Sophomore (RS) QB Johnny Manziel were suspended for a half. Redshirt Junior QB Matt Joeckel started and played the entire first half until Manziel's return.

The Aggies received to start the game and punted after only 1 first down. Drew Kaser started his stellar season off with a 55-yard punt downed inside the 5 yard line. The Owls then started with a strong drive opened by a 26-yard pass from McHargue to Cella. Just a few plays later McHargue would keep the ball on an option play and bust a 57-yard run down field, only just caught from behind by Junior LB Tommy Sanders. Two plays later, Senior RB Charles Ross punched the ball into the endzone to put the Owls up 7–0. On A&M's following series, the ball was in the air only twice out of 10 plays, finished off by a rush from Senior RB Ben Malena for 4 yards for the TD to tie the game. Rice's ensuing drive moved steadily down the field, capped off by an 18-yard scramble by McHargue and a 19-yard wheel route pass to Ross for the TD. Rice was up 14–7. The teams traded punts on their following drives, and with a few minutes left, A&M went on a steady drive down to the Rice 41 to end the quarter.

A&M continued its drive in the 2nd Quarter, highlighted by a 26-yard pass from Joeckel to Sophomore (RS) sensation Mike Evans. Sophomore (RS) RB Tra Carson would run the ball in a few plays later to tie the game. Despite a 22-yard run from Ross on Rice's following drive, the Owls were forced to punt, due to a tackle for a loss by true freshman and future star LB Darian Claiborne on 3rd down. Only a few plays into the Aggies’ next outing, Joeckel hit Freshman receiver Ricky Seals-Jones for a 71-yard TD and the lead. Afterwards, A&M forced Rice to punt once again and then added to their lead with another TD by Carson on a steady drive. With 3:42 left in the half, Rice went on a strong drive including 2 great passes by McHargue to Junior WR Jordan Taylor, one for 27 yards and the other for a 5-yard TD after the ball was deflected by Senior CB Toney Hurd Jr. The score was 28–21 Texas A&M at halftime, after which star Aggie QB Johnny Manziel would return.

Rice received the 2nd half kickoff and had 2 incompletions before McHargue was intercepted by Junior CB Tramain Jacobs, starting Manziel's return to college football. The Sophomore's first play of 2013 was a 12-yard scramble; however, he was sacked just 2 plays later, forcing A&M to take the 44-yard Field Goal. Rice's ensuing drive did not turn out any better than its predecessor, as Junior (RS) S Clay Honeycutt grabbed A&M's second interception of the game. This time, Manziel was able to take the team to the endzone on a 23-yard toss to Evans for the TD. The teams traded punts before Rice went on a nearly 6 minute drive to end the half at A&M's 1-yard line. On the first play of the 4th Quarter, Ross carried the Owls into the endzone to make the score 28–38. However, A&M's offense had hit its rhythm and Manziel notched a 34-yard pass to Junior (RS) receiver Malcome Kennedy before hitting Malena out of the backfield for 18 yards and the TD. Down by 17, Rice was feeling the pressure on their next drive. After gaining a few yards, the Owls went for it on 4th down, where true Freshman DT Jay Arnold pushed through the line and forced Ross right into Junior DE Tyrell Taylor, where he was tackled for a loss. With a short field, A&M scored quickly via another TD pass to Evans for 9 yards. With little hope of winning the game, Rice put in Sophomore QB Driphus Jackson, who led the team on a long drive capped off by a 43-yard FG. A&M simply ran out the clock with 2:03 left in the game.

Texas A&M won its season opener, and the star Manziel looked as good as ever, going 6-of-8 for 94 yards and three touchdowns; however, Rice ran for 306 yards, averaging 6 yards-per-carry, which hinted at the defensive issues (particularly in the running game) that would haunt A&M for the rest of the season.

=== No. 4 (FCS) Sam Houston State ===
Team	1	2	3	4	Total
No. 4 (FCS) Bearkats	7	7	14	0	28
• No. 7 Aggies	14	16	35	0	65

- Date: September 7
- Location: Kyle Field
  College Station, Texas
- Game start: 6:06 p.m. CST
- Elapsed time: 3:24
- Game attendance: 86,800
- Game weather: 79 °F (26 °C), Cloudy, winds SE at 8mph
- Referee: Marc Curles
- TV announcers (FSSW PPV): Bill Land, Shea Walker, & Kayce Smith

Scoring summary
1	10:52	TAMU	Tra Carson 1-yard touchdown run, Taylor Bertolet kick good	TAMU 7–0
1	7:51	SHSU	Timothy Flanders 11-yard touchdown run, Luc Swimberghe kick good	Tied 7–7
1	2:43	TAMU	Sabian Holmes 27-yard touchdown pass from Johnny Manziel, Taylor Bertolet	TAMU 14–7
2	11:31	TAMU	Ben Malena 1-yard touchdown run, Taylor Bertolet kick failed	TAMU 20–7
2	4:23	TAMU	Ja'Quay Williams 20-yard touchdown pass from Johnny Manziel, Taylor Bertolet kick good	TAMU 27–7
2	1:59	SHSU	Timothy Sanders 33-yard touchdown pass from Brian Bell, Luc Swimberghe kick good	TAMU 27–14
2	0:00	TAMU	Taylor Bertolet 35-yard Field Goal	TAMU 30–14
3	14:04	SHSU	Timothy Flanders 68-yard touchdown run, Luc Swimberghe kick good	TAMU 30–21
3	10:27	TAMU	Tra Carson 1-yard touchdown run, Taylor Bertolet kick good	TAMU 37–21
3	6:27	TAMU	Brandon Williams 10-yard touchdown pass from Johnny Manziel, Taylor Bertolet kick good	TAMU 44–21
3	6:13	SHSU	Torrance Williams 77-yard touchdown pass from Brian Bell, Luc Swimberghe kick good	TAMU 44–28
3	5:24	TAMU	Johnny Manziel 6-yard touchdown run, Taylor Bertolet kick good	TAMU 51–28
3	3:42	TAMU	Nate Askew 30-yard interception return for a touchdown, Taylor Bertolet kick good	TAMU 58–28
3	1:14	TAMU	Travis Labhart 14-yard touchdown pass from Kenny Hill, Taylor Bertolet kick good	TAMU 65–28

Statistics	SHSU	TAMU
First downs	14	38
Total yards	390	714
Rushing yards	240	214
Passing yards	150	500
Turnovers	2	1
Time of possession	29:19	30:41

Team	Category	Player	Statistics
Sam Houston State	Passing	Brian Bell	6/15, 137 yards, 2 TD, 2 INT
Sam Houston State	Rushing	Timothy Flanders	19 rushes, 170 yards, 2 TD
Sam Houston State	Receiving	Torrance Williams	3 receptions, 86 yards, TD
Texas A&M	Passing	Johnny Manziel	29/42, 426 yards, 3 TD, INT
Texas A&M	Rushing	Ben Malena	9 rushes, 68 yards, TD
Texas A&M	Receiving	Mike Evans	7 receptions, 155 yards

Sam Houston faced Texas A&M for the second consecutive year, facing the FBS powerhouse for the twelfth time. The Aggies had won all previous meetings.

The Aggies drew first blood in the first quarter, with A&M running back Tra Carson finishing a drive with a one-yard scoring run with 10:52 remaining in the period, which followed with the extra point brought the score to 7–0 Aggies. The Bearkats struck back on their next possession, with running back Timothy Flanders scoring on an 11-yard run at the 7:51-minute marker, followed by the extra point tying the score 7–7. Aggies quarterback Johnny Manziel connected with a 27-yard pass to wide receiver Sabian Holmes with less than three minutes in the quarter, putting A&M back on top 14–7.

The Aggies scored again in the second quarter at the 11:31 mark with a one-yard run by running back Ben Malena, however the extra point attempt by kicker Taylor Bertolet failed, with the new score 20–7 Aggies. A&M was again on the board at 4:23 with a 20-yard pass by Manziel to wide receiver Ja'Quay Williams, and with the extra point the new score was 27–7 Aggies. The Bearkats finally answered with a 33-yard pass by quarterback Brian Bell to Flanders, and kicker Luc Swimberghe's extra point brought the score to 27–14 Aggies. The Aggies made the final score in the period with a 35-yard field goal by Bertolet in the closing seconds, with the Aggies leading at halftime 30–14.

The Bearkats struck quickly in the third quarter, with Flanders making a 68-yard scoring running at the 14:04 mark, and the extra point reduced the Aggies lead to 30–21. Not to be outdone, the Aggies made two consecutive scoring drives, culminating in a one-yard run by Carson at the 10:27-minute mark and a ten-yard pass by Manziel to running back Brandon Williams at the 6:27-mark, raising the Aggie's lead to 44–28. The Bearkats struck again a mere 14 seconds after the previous Aggies score with Bell connecting with Torrance Williams on a 75-yard pass, bringing the score to 44–28 Aggies. After that Texas A&M kept the Bearkats from the endzone, and Manziel made a six-yard quarterback keeper at the 5:24-minute mark, Aggies linebacker Nate Askew intercepted Bell for a pick-six with 3:42 remaining in the quarter and backup Aggies quarterback connected with wide receiver Travis Labhart at the 1:14-minute mark, all together raising the lead to 65–28 Aggies.

By the fourth quarter both teams had pulled their starters and the game was a defensive standoff, both teams keeping each other from scoring. The final score was 65–28 Aggies.

Sam Houston quarterback Brian Bell completed six of 15 pass attempts for 137 yards with two interception, with fellow quarterback Don King III completing one pass for 13 yards. Sam Houston's rushing game was anchored by Timothy Flanders who ran 19 times for 170 yards including two running touchdowns, followed by Keshawn Hill who carried the ball three times for 42 yards, Richard Sincere who ran six times for 11 yards and Ryan Wilson who rushed five times for ten yards.

With the loss, Sam Houston is tied 1–1. Texas A&M leads the all-times series 12–0.

=== No. 1 Alabama ===
Team	1	2	3	4	Total
• No. 1 Crimson Tide	7	21	14	7	49
No. 6 Aggies	14	0	7	21	42

- Location: Kyle Field
  College Station, Texas
- Game start: 2:42 p.m. CST
- Elapsed time: 3:35
- Game attendance: 87,596
- Game weather: 95°, Partly Cloudy
- Referee: Tom Ritter
- TV announcers (CBS): Verne Lundquist (play-by-play), Gary Danielson (color), Tracy Wolfson (sideline)

Scoring summary
1	12:21	Texas A&M	Cameron Clear one-yard pass from Johnny Manziel (Taylor Bertolet kick)	Texas A&M 7–0
1	7:47	Texas A&M	Ben Malena one-yard run (Taylor Bertolet kick)	Texas A&M 14–0
1	5:24	Alabama	Kevin Norwood 22-yard pass from A. J. McCarron (Cade Foster kick)	Texas A&M 14–7
2	14:15	Alabama	DeAndrew White 44-yard pass from A. J. McCarron (Cade Foster kick)	14–14
2	8:55	Alabama	Kenny Bell 51-yard pass from A. J. McCarron (Cade Foster kick)	Alabama 21–14
2	0:45	Alabama	T. J. Yeldon four-yard run (Cade Foster kick)	Alabama 28–14
3	12:41	Alabama	Vinnie Sunseri 73-yard interception return (Cade Foster kick)	Alabama 35–14
3	9:33	Texas A&M	Malcome Kennedy 14-yard pass from Johnny Manziel (Taylor Bertolet kick)	Alabama 35–21
3	4:16	Alabama	Kenyan Drake three-yard run (Cade Foster kick)	Alabama 42–21
4	13:20	Texas A&M	Malcome Kennedy 12-yard pass from Johnny Manziel (Taylor Bertolet kick)	Alabama 42–28
4	8:04	Texas A&M	Mike Evans 95-yard pass from Johnny Manziel (Taylor Bertolet kick)	Alabama 42–35
4	2:28	Alabama	Jalston Fowler five-yard pass from A. J. McCarron (Cade Foster kick)	Alabama 49–35
4	0:15	Texas A&M	Malcome Kennedy four-yard pass from Johnny Manziel (Taylor Bertolet kick)	Alabama 49–42

Statistics	ALA	TAMU
First downs	31	31
Total yards	568	628
Rushing yards	234	164
Passing yards	334	464
Turnovers	1	2
Time of possession	35:02	24:58

Team	Category	Player	Statistics
Alabama	Passing	A. J. McCarron	20/29, 334 yards, 4 TD
Alabama	Rushing	T. J. Yeldon	25 rushes, 149 yards, TD
Alabama	Receiving	DeAndrew White	4 receptions, 82 yards, TD
Texas A&M	Passing	Johnny Manziel	28/39, 464 yards, 5 TD, 2 INT
Texas A&M	Rushing	Johnny Manziel	14 rushes, 98 yards
Texas A&M	Receiving	Mike Evans	7 receptions, 279 yards, TD

In the first conference game of the 2013 season, Alabama defeated the Texas A&M Aggies at College Station 49–42. Texas A&M opened the game with a pair of touchdowns on their first two offensive possessions and took a 14–0 lead. After they received the opening kickoff, the Aggies scored on their first possession when Johnny Manziel threw a one-yard touchdown pass to Cameron Clear and on their second possession on a one-yard Ben Malena touchdown run. Alabama responded with their first of five consecutive touchdowns on their next possession and cut the A&M lead to 14–7 when A. J. McCarron threw a 22-yard touchdown pass to Kevin Norwood.

After the Crimson Tide defense held the Aggies to a punt, McCarron threw his second touchdown pass of the afternoon on the drive that ensued early in the second quarter on a 44-yard flea flicker pass to DeAndrew White that tied the game 14–14. On the next drive, Cyrus Jones intercepted a Manziel pass in the endzone for a touchback and Alabama possession. McCarron then threw his third touchdown pass on the game from 51-yards to Kenny Bell and gave the Crimson Tide their first lead of the game, 21–14. Alabama then closed the first half with an 11 play, 93 yard drive capped with a four-yard T. J. Yeldon touchdown run for a 28–14 halftime lead.

After the A&M defense forced a punt on the opening possession of the third quarter, Vinnie Sunseri intercepted the first Manziel pass of the second half and returned it 73-yards for a touchdown and extended the Alabama lead to 35–14. The Aggies responded on the drive that followed with a 14-yard Manziel touchdown pass to Malcome Kennedy and was followed with a three-yard Kenyan Drake touchdown run that made the score 42–21 in favor of the Crimson Tide at the end of the third quarter. In the fourth, the Aggies scored first on a 12-yard Kennedy touchdown reception, and Alabama looked like they were about to respond with a touchdown as well, but Yeldon fumbled at the two-yard line that was recovered by A&M. Three plays later, Manziel threw a 95-yard touchdown pass to Mike Evans that cut the Crimson Tide lead to 42–35. Alabama rebounded on their next drive that was capped with a five-yard McCarron touchdown pass to Jalston Fowler that extended their lead to 49–35. A four-yard touchdown pass from Manziel to Kennedy in the last 0:20 made the final score 49–42.

The 628 yards of total offense by the A&M offense were the most ever surrendered by an Alabama defense in the history of the program. For his career-high 334 yards on 20 of 29 passing and four touchdowns, McCarron was recognized as the SEC Offensive Player of the Week. The victory improved Alabama's all-time record against the Aggies to 4–2.

=== SMU ===
	1	2	3	4	Total
Mustangs	3	3	0	7	13
No. 10 Aggies	14	18	10	0	42

Statistics	SMU	TAMU
First downs	25	27
Total yards	434	581
Rushing yards	93	265
Passing yards	341	316
Turnovers	3	1
Time of possession	29:04	30:56

Team	Category	Player	Statistics
SMU	Passing	Garrett Gilbert	37/62, 310 yards, TD, INT
SMU	Rushing	Prescott Line	9 rushes, 40 yards
SMU	Receiving	Keenan Holman	10 receptions, 133 yards, TD
Texas A&M	Passing	Johnny Manziel	14/21, 244 yards, TD, INT
Texas A&M	Rushing	Johnny Manziel	12 rushes, 102 yards, 2 TD
Texas A&M	Receiving	Malcome Kennedy	6 receptions, 83 yards, TD

This game was the 80th meeting of the SMU Mustangs and the Texas A&M Aggies. The most recent match-up was September 15, 2012, a game in which Texas A&M defeated SMU with a final score of 48–3. After this match-up, Texas A&M leads the series 44–29–7.

=== At Arkansas ===
	1	2	3	4	Total
No. 10 Aggies	17	7	14	7	45
Razorbacks	7	13	13	0	33

Statistics	TAMU	ARK
First downs	26	23
Total yards	523	483
Rushing yards	262	201
Passing yards	261	282
Turnovers	0	2
Time of possession	31:43	28:17

Team	Category	Player	Statistics
Texas A&M	Passing	Johnny Manziel	23/30, 261 yards, 2 TD
Texas A&M	Rushing	Trey Williams	9 rushes, 83 yards, TD
Texas A&M	Receiving	Mike Evans	6 receptions, 116 yards, 2 TD
Arkansas	Passing	Brandon Allen	17/36, 282 yards, 3 TD, 2 INT
Arkansas	Rushing	Alex Collins	14 rushes, 116 yards, TD
Arkansas	Receiving	Hunter Henry	4 receptions, 109 yards

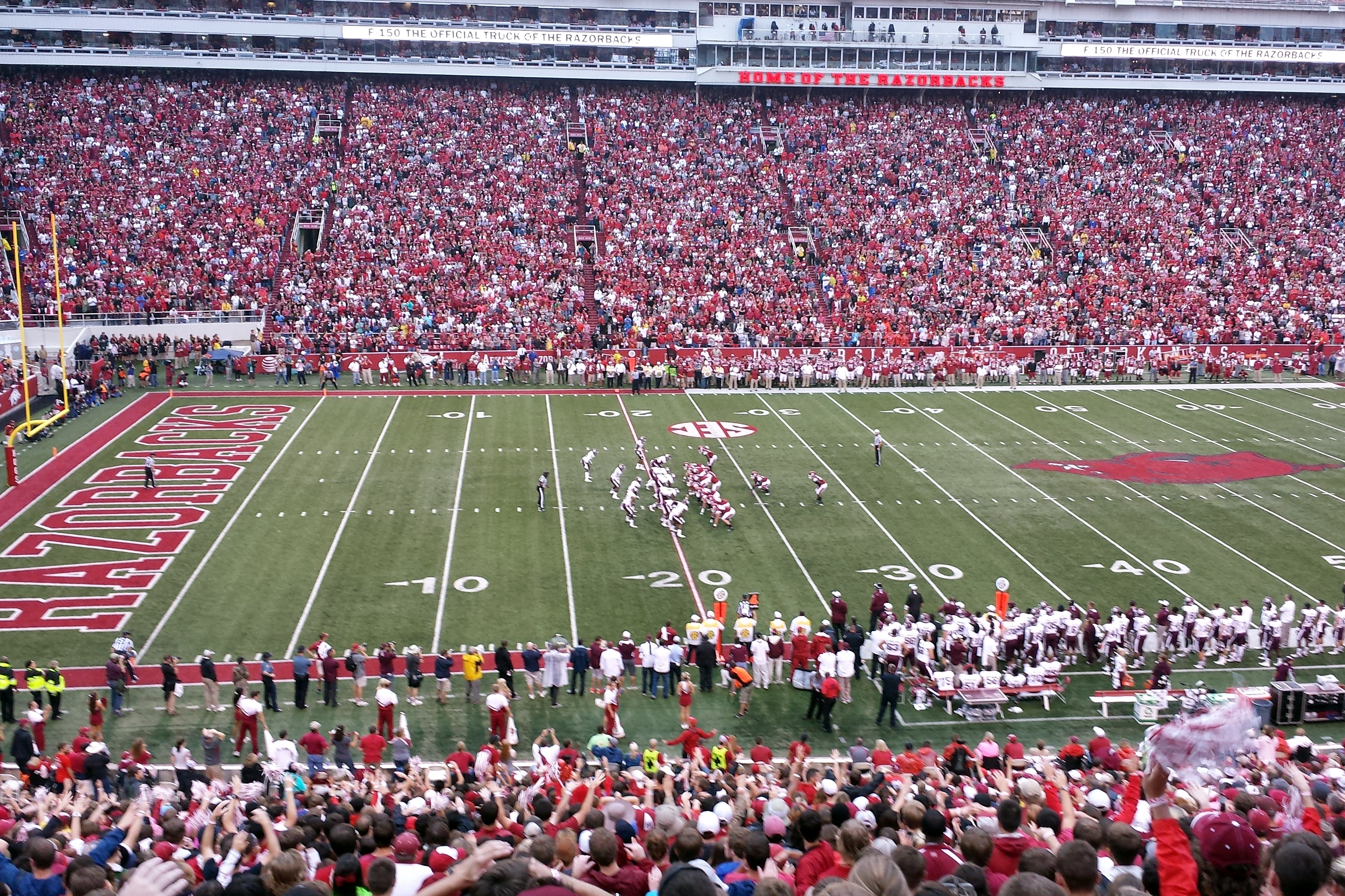
The Arkansas Razorbacks offense lines up for a play against the Aggie defense

=== At Ole Miss ===
	1	2	3	4	Total
No. 9 Aggies	14	0	7	20	41
Rebels	7	3	7	21	38

Statistics	TAMU	MISS
First downs	33	23
Total yards	587	462
Rushing yards	241	133
Passing yards	346	329
Turnovers	2	1
Time of possession	32:36	27:24

Team	Category	Player	Statistics
Texas A&M	Passing	Johnny Manziel	31/39, 346 yards, INT
Texas A&M	Rushing	Johnny Manziel	19 rushes, 124 yards, 2 TD
Texas A&M	Receiving	Travis Labhart	8 receptions, 97 yards
Ole Miss	Passing	Bo Wallace	22/36, 301 yards, 3 TD, INT
Ole Miss	Rushing	Jaylen Walton	7 rushes, 41 yards
Ole Miss	Receiving	Vince Sanders	3 receptions, 90 yards, TD

=== No. 24 Auburn ===
Team	1	2	3	4	Total
• No. 24 Tigers	10	7	7	21	45
No. 7 Aggies	14	10	7	10	41

- Location: Kyle Field
  College Station, Texas
- Game start: 2:47 p.m. CST
- Elapsed time: 3:46
- Game attendance: 87,165
- Game weather: 65°, Sunny
- Referee: Penn Wagers
- TV announcers (CBS): Verne Lundquist (play-by-play), Gary Danielson (color), Tracy Wolfson (sideline)

Statistics	AUB	TAMU
First downs	27	29
Total yards	615	602
Rushing yards	379	133
Passing yards	236	469
Turnovers	1	2
Time of possession	32:16	27:44

Team	Category	Player	Statistics
Auburn	Passing	Nick Marshall	11/23, 236 yards, 2 TD
Auburn	Rushing	Tre Mason	27 rushes, 178 yards, TD
Auburn	Receiving	Sammie Coates	5 receptions, 104 yards, TD
Texas A&M	Passing	Johnny Manziel	28/38, 454 yards, 4 TD, 2 INT
Texas A&M	Rushing	Johnny Manziel	18 rushes, 48 yards, TD
Texas A&M	Receiving	Mike Evans	11 receptions, 287 yards, 4 TD

Auburn's defense came up with a huge final stand to upset 7th rank Texas A&M. With 1:19 left in the game Auburn held a 45–41 lead. A&M's QB Johnny Manziel completed two big pass plays to WR Mike Evans to get it down to Auburn's 18 yard line. DE Dee Ford would come up with an 8-yard sack then Manziel would throw an incompletion. On the next play Manziel tried to run but was tackled by LB Kris Frost. Then on 4th and long Auburn Dee Ford sacked Manziel once again ending the game. QB Nick Marshall passed for 236 yards and 2 TD's and ran for 100 yards and 2 TD's, he had one fumble. Tre Mason added 178 yards rushing and 2 TD's. The defenses recorded 7 tackles for loss, 3 sacks and 2 interceptions on the 3rd best offense in the nation. Ryan White who moved to safety that morning after Josh Hosley was injured recorded 5 tackles and an interception without knowing the proper alignments. Auburn's DE LaDarius Owens injured Johnny Manziel early in the 4th Quarter and he missed a series. Auburn would vault to No 11 in the first BCS Poll of the year and they would eventually win out with miracle finishes against rivals Georgia and Alabama. This allowed the Tigers to play in the SEC Championship, which they won over Missouri. Due to Ohio State’s loss to Michigan State in the Big Ten Championship, Auburn moved up to #2 and was selected play in the BCS National Championship where they lost 34-31 to Florida State.

=== Vanderbilt ===
	1	2	3	4	Total
Commodores	0	17	0	7	24
No. 14 Aggies	21	7	21	7	56

Statistics	VAN	TAMU
First downs	19	28
Total yards	329	558
Rushing yards	95	182
Passing yards	234	376
Turnovers	3	5
Time of possession	32:19	27:41

Team	Category	Player	Statistics
Vanderbilt	Passing	Patton Robinette	15/28, 216 yards, TD, 2 INT
Vanderbilt	Rushing	Jerron Seymour	16 rushes, 53 yards, TD
Vanderbilt	Receiving	Jordan Matthews	8 receptions, 92 yards
Texas A&M	Passing	Johnny Manziel	25/35, 305 yards, 4 TD, INT
Texas A&M	Rushing	Trey Williams	6 rushes, 65 yards, TD
Texas A&M	Receiving	Malcome Kennedy	8 receptions, 83 yards

=== UTEP ===
	1	2	3	4	Total
Miners	7	0	0	0	7
No. 12 Aggies	9	27	21	0	57

Statistics	UTEP	TAMU
First downs	10	25
Total yards	198	564
Rushing yards	127	234
Passing yards	71	330
Turnovers	4	1
Time of possession	36:06	23:54

Team	Category	Player	Statistics
UTEP	Passing	Blaire Sullivan	9/17, 71 yards, 3 INT
UTEP	Rushing	Aaron Jones	22 rushes, 62 yards, TD
UTEP	Receiving	Devin Patterson	1 reception, 32 yards
Texas A&M	Passing	Johnny Manziel	16/24, 273 yards, 4 TD
Texas A&M	Rushing	Johnny Manziel	7 rushes, 67 yards, 2 TD
Texas A&M	Receiving	Travis Labhart	4 receptions, 83 yards, 2 TD

This was Texas A&M's 700th win in school history.

=== Mississippi State ===
Team	1	2	3	4	Total
Bulldogs	7	7	6	21	41
• No. 11 Aggies	16	7	14	14	51

- Date: November 9
- Location: Kyle Field
  College Station, Texas
- Game start: 2:30 p.m. CST
- Elapsed time: 3:53
- Game attendance: 88,504
- Game weather: 62 °F (17 °C), Partly Cloudy, winds E 6mph
- Referee: Ken Williamson
- TV announcers (CBS): Tim Brando, Aaron Taylor, and Kristina Akra

Scoring summary
1	5:45	TAMU	Malcome Kennedy 12-yard touchdown pass from Johnny Manziel, Josh Lambo kick good	TAMU 7–0
1	5:28	MSU	Josh Robinson 51-yard touchdown run, Evan Sobiesk kick good	Tie 7–7
1	1:28	TAMU	Team Safety	TAMU 9–7
1	0:11	TAMU	Travis Labhart 33-yard touchdown pass from Johnny Manziel, Josh Lambo kick good	TAMU 16–7
2	0:54	MSU	De'Runnya Wilson 3-yard touchdown pass Dak Prescott, Evan Sobiesk kick good	TAMU 16–14
2	0:16	TAMU	Travis Labhart 11-yard touchdown pass from Johnny Manziel, Josh Lambo kick good	TAMU 23–14
3	7:34	TAMU	Malcome Kennedy 21-yard touchdown pass from Johnny Manziel, Josh Lambo kick good	TAMU 30–14
3	0:44	MSU	LaDarius Perkins 12-yard touchdown pass from Dak Prescott, Dak Prescott pass intercepted	TAMU 30–20
3	0:12	TAMU	Trey 15-yard touchdown run, Josh Lambo kick good	TAMU 37–20
4	14:53	MSU	Joe Morrow 33-yard touchdown pass from Jameon Lewis, Evan Sobiesk kick good	TAMU 37–27
4	13:54	TAMU	Nehemiah Hicks 2-yard touchdown pass from Johnny Manziel, Josh Lambo kick good	TAMU 44–27
4	10:54	TAMU	Ben Malena 2-yard touchdown run, Josh Lambo kick good	TAMU 51–27
4	6:45	MSU	LaDarius Perkins 1-yard touchdown run, Dak Prescott rush	TAMU 51–35
4	2:19	MSU	De'Runnya Wilson 9-yard touchdown pass from Tyler Russell, Tyler Russell rush failed	TAMU 51–41

Statistics	MSST	TAMU
First downs	30	29
Total yards	556	537
Rushing yards	299	91
Passing yards	257	446
Turnovers	1	3
Time of possession	34:52	25:08

Team	Category	Player	Statistics
Mississippi State	Passing	Dak Prescott	14/26, 149 yards, 2 TD, INT
Mississippi State	Rushing	Dak Prescott	16 rushes, 154 yards
Mississippi State	Receiving	De'Runnya Wilson	7 receptions, 75 yards, 2 TD
Texas A&M	Passing	Johnny Manziel	30/39, 446 yards, 5 TD, 3 INT
Texas A&M	Rushing	Johnny Manziel	14 rushes, 47 yards
Texas A&M	Receiving	Mike Evans	5 receptions, 116 yards

=== At No. 18 LSU ===
	1	2	3	4	Total
No. 9 Aggies	0	10	0	0	10
No. 18 Tigers	7	14	10	3	34

Statistics	TAMU	LSU
First downs	17	23
Total yards	299	517
Rushing yards	75	324
Passing yards	224	193
Turnovers	2	0
Time of possession	20:14	39:46

Team	Category	Player	Statistics
Texas A&M	Passing	Johnny Manziel	16/41, 224 yards, TD, 2 INT
Texas A&M	Rushing	Johnny Manziel	12 rushes, 54 yards
Texas A&M	Receiving	Derel Walker	6 receptions, 130 yards, TD
LSU	Passing	Zach Mettenberger	11/20, 193 yards, 2 TD
LSU	Rushing	Terrence Magee	13 rushes, 149 yards, TD
LSU	Receiving	Jarvis Landry	4 receptions, 87 yards, 2 TD

=== At No. 5 Missouri ===
	1	2	3	4	Total
No. 19 Aggies	7	7	0	7	21
No. 5 Tigers	0	7	14	7	28

Statistics	TAMU	MIZ
First downs	18	22
Total yards	379	463
Rushing yards	184	225
Passing yards	195	238
Turnovers	1	0
Time of possession	28:37	31:23

Team	Category	Player	Statistics
Texas A&M	Passing	Johnny Manziel	24/35, 195 yards, TD
Texas A&M	Rushing	Brandon Williams	6 rushes, 57 yards
Texas A&M	Receiving	Travis Labhart	7 receptions, 81 yards
Missouri	Passing	James Franklin	18/28, 233 yards, 2 TD
Missouri	Rushing	Henry Josey	13 rushes, 96 yards, TD
Missouri	Receiving	L'Damian Washington	6 receptions, 97 yards, TD

=== Vs. Duke (Chick-fil-A Bowl) ===
	1	2	3	4	Total
No. 22 Blue Devils	14	24	3	7	48
No. 20 Aggies	3	14	14	21	52

Statistics	DUKE	TAMU
First downs	29	30
Total yards	661	541
Rushing yards	234	159
Passing yards	427	382
Turnovers	2	0
Time of possession	35:02	24:58

Team	Category	Player	Statistics
Duke	Passing	Anthony Boone	29/45, 427 yards, 3 TD, 2 INT
Duke	Rushing	Josh Snead	17 rushes, 104 yards, TD
Duke	Receiving	Jamison Crowder	12 receptions, 163 yards, TD
Texas A&M	Passing	Johnny Manziel	30/38, 382 yards, 4 TD
Texas A&M	Rushing	Johnny Manziel	11 rushes, 73 yards, TD
Texas A&M	Receiving	Derel Walker	6 receptions, 113 yards, TD

== Notes ==
- December 22, 2013 – Texas A&M linebacker Darian Claiborne was suspended after he was arrested on suspicion on drug possession.
