= 2013 Chick-fil-A Bowl =

2013 Peach Bowl
- 46th Peach Bowl
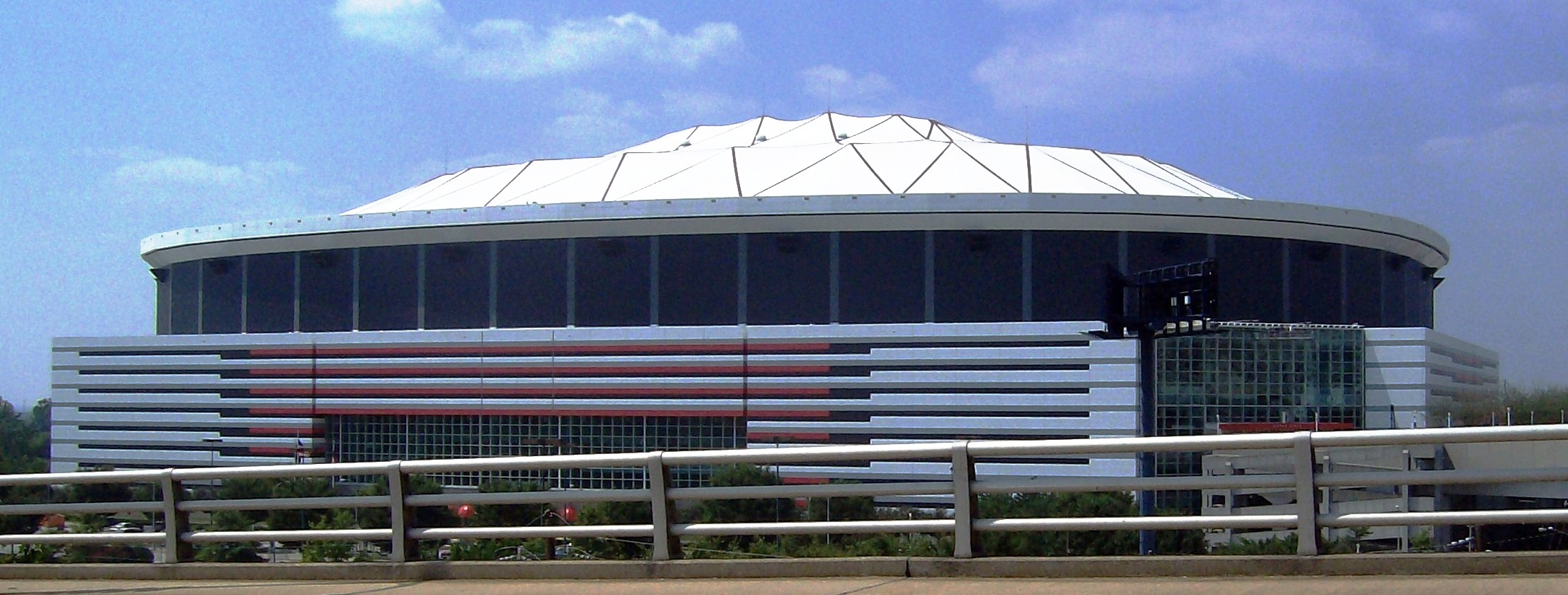
- The Georgia Dome in Atlanta, Georgia, hosted the Peach Bowl.
| Duke Blue Devils | Texas A&M Aggies |
| (10–3) | (8–4) |
| ACC | SEC |
| 48 | 52 |
| Head coach: David Cutcliffe | Head coach: Kevin Sumlin |
| AP / Coaches / BCS; 22 / T-21 / 24 | AP / Coaches / BCS; 20 / T-21 / 21 |
| | 1 | 2 | 3 | 4 | Total |
|---|---|---|---|---|---|
| Duke | 14 | 24 | 3 | 7 | 48 |
| Texas A&M | 3 | 14 | 14 | 21 | 52 |
- Date: December 31, 2013
- Season: 2013
- Stadium: Georgia Dome
- Location: Atlanta, Georgia
- MVP: Offensive: Johnny Manziel (QB – Texas A&M); Defensive: Toney Hurd Jr. (DB – Texas A&M)
- Favorite: Texas A&M by 12
- National anthem: Fightin’ Texas Aggie Band
- Referee: Jeff Maconaghy (American)
- Halftime show: Fightin’ Texas Aggie Band, Duke University Marching Band
- Attendance: 67,496
- Payout: US$$7.4 million (total)

United States TV coverage
- Network: ESPN
- Announcers: Rece Davis (play-by-play); Jesse Palmer (analyst); David Pollack (analyst); Samantha Ponder (sideline)
- Nielsen ratings: 8.69 million viewers

The 2013 Chick-fil-A Bowl, more commonly known as the 2013 Peach Bowl, was a college football bowl game played on December 31, 2013, at the Georgia Dome in Atlanta, Georgia. With sponsorship from Chick-fil-A, it was the 46th edition of the game known throughout most of its history as the Peach Bowl. The game featured the Duke Blue Devils from the Atlantic Coast Conference against the Texas A&M Aggies from the Southeastern Conference. It began at 8:00 p.m. EST and was aired on ESPN. It was one of the 2013–14 bowl games that concluded the 2013 FBS football season.

In a contest dominated by both teams' offensive units, Duke scored first and stayed ahead for most of the game. But with a little more than a minute left in regulation, Texas A&M returned an interception for a touchdown, and ended up winning by a score of 52–48. Although 67,496 tickets were distributed, the crowd was far less than capacity.

Duke finished the regular season with a record of 10–3 (6–2 ACC) and a BCS ranking of #24. Texas A&M had a record of 8–4 (4–4 SEC) and a BCS ranking of #21. The 2013 Chick-fil-A Bowl was the first-ever meeting of the two teams.

== Teams ==
The 2013 Chick-fil-A Bowl was the very first meeting between Duke and Texas A&M, as well as both programs' first appearance in the bowl. Both teams were ranked #21 in the Coaches' Poll coming into the game.

=== Scoring summary ===
Scoring summary

| Quarter | Time | Drive | | | Team | Scoring information | Score | |
| Quarter | Time | Plays | Yards | TOP | Team | Scoring information | Duke | Texas A&M |
|---|---|---|---|---|---|---|---|---|
| 1 | 8:50 | 8 | 63 | 3:41 | DUKE | Josh Snead 11-yard touchdown reception from Anthony Boone, Ross Martin kick good | 7 | 0 |
| 1 | 5:31 | 11 | 53 | 3:19 | TAMU | 45-yard field goal by Josh Lambo | 7 | 3 |
| 1 | 4:12 | 5 | 79 | 1:19 | DUKE | Brandon Connette 3-yard touchdown run, Martin kick good | 14 | 3 |
| 2 | 14:21 | 3 | 24 | 1:18 | DUKE | Boone 11-yard touchdown run, Martin kick good | 21 | 3 |
| 2 | 13:04 | 4 | 75 | 1:17 | TAMU | Travis Labhart 23-yard touchdown reception from Johnny Manziel, Lambo kick good | 21 | 10 |
| 2 | 11:49 | 3 | 75 | 1:15 | DUKE | Jamison Crowder 59-yard touchdown reception from Boone, Martin kick good | 28 | 10 |
| 2 | 6:45 | 13 | 75 | 5:04 | TAMU | Labhart 9-yard touchdown reception from Manziel, Lambo kick good | 28 | 17 |
| 2 | 2:31 | 11 | 75 | 4:14 | DUKE | Snead 25-yard touchdown run, Martin kick good | 35 | 17 |
| 2 | 0:00 | 7 | 49 | 2:31 | DUKE | 18-yard field goal by Martin | 38 | 17 |
| 3 | 9:55 | 6 | 64 | 2:03 | TAMU | Labhart 19-yard touchdown reception from Manziel, Lambo kick good | 38 | 24 |
| 3 | 5:05 | 6 | 70 | 2:03 | TAMU | Tra Carson 21-yard touchdown run, Lambo kick good | 38 | 31 |
| 3 | 0:43 | 9 | 73 | 4:22 | DUKE | 20-yard field goal by Martin | 41 | 31 |
| 4 | 12:48 | 3 | 67 | 1:02 | TAMU | Manziel 3-yard touchdown run, Lambo kick good | 41 | 38 |
| 4 | 6:46 | 14 | 75 | 6:02 | DUKE | David Reeves 21-yard touchdown reception from Boone, Martin kick good | 48 | 38 |
| 4 | 5:44 | 3 | 67 | 1:02 | TAMU | Derel Walker 44-yard touchdown reception from Manziel, Lambo kick good | 48 | 45 |
| 4 | 3:33 | | | | TAMU | Interception returned 55 yards for touchdown by Toney Hurd Jr., Lambo kick good | 48 | 52 |
| "TOP" = time of possession. For other American football terms, see Glossary of American football. | | | | | | | 48 | 52 |

=== Statistics ===
| Statistics | Duke | Texas A&M |
|---|---|---|
| First downs | 29 | 30 |
| Total offense, plays – yards | 82-661 | 68-541 |
| Rushes-yards (net) | 234 | 159 |
| Passing yards (net) | 427 | 382 |
| Passes, Comp-Att-Int | 29-45-2 | 30-38-0 |
| Time of Possession | 35:02 | 24:58 |

== Notes ==
- December 22, 2013 – Texas A&M linebacker Darian Claiborne was suspended after he was arrested on suspicion on drug possession.
