= Travis Labhart =

American football player (born 1991)

No. 19
- Position: Wide receiver

Personal information
- Born: January 20, 1991 (age 35); Whitesboro, Texas, U.S.
- Listed height: 5 ft 9 in (1.75 m)
- Listed weight: 182 lb (83 kg)

Career information
- High school: Whitesboro (TX)
- College: Texas A&M
- NFL draft: 2014: undrafted

Career history
- Houston Texans (2014)*
- * Offseason or practice squad member only
- Stats at Pro Football Reference

Travis Labhart (born January 20, 1991) is an American former football wide receiver.

== College career ==
Labhart played for the Texas A&M Aggies football team as a wide receiver. Labhart scored 3 touchdowns in Texas A&M's come from behind win against Duke in the 2013 Chick-fil-A Bowl.

== Professional career ==
Labhart was signed by the Houston Texans as an undrafted free agent on May 16, 2014. Labhart made his NFL debut in week four of the 2014 preseason and had three receptions, including a game-winning 2-point conversion. On August 30, 2014, Labhart was waived by the Texans, then signed to the Texans practice squad two days later. On September 16, 2014, Labhart was released by the Texans, before signing to the Texans practice squad again two weeks later.

Labhart was released by the Texans on September 1, 2015, his cut being featured on the HBO series Hard Knocks.

== Personal life ==
Labhart was featured on Dude Perfect's "NFL Draft Training" video special, released April 28, 2014 on Dude Perfect's YouTube channel. The video has gained over 28.1 million views and 151 thousand likes as of 2024.

In June 2015, Labhart married his college sweetheart, Carrie Woodard.
