= Ben Malena =

American gridiron football player (born 1992)

No. 34
- Position: Running back

Personal information
- Born: May 29, 1992 (age 34); Cedar Hill, Texas, U.S.
- Listed height: 5 ft 9 in (1.75 m)
- Listed weight: 195 lb (88 kg)

Career information
- High school: Cedar Hill
- College: Texas A&M
- NFL draft: 2014: undrafted

Career history
- Dallas Cowboys (2014)*; Houston Texans (2014–2015)*; Dallas Cowboys (2015–2016)*; Toronto Argonauts (2016–2017)
- * Offseason or practice squad member only
- Stats at Pro Football Reference

Ben Malena (born May 29, 1992) is an American former football running back. He was signed as an undrafted free agent by the Dallas Cowboys after the 2014 NFL draft. He played college football at Texas A&M.

== Professional career ==
=== Dallas Cowboys (first stint) ===
On May 12, 2014, Malena signed with the Dallas Cowboys. On August 9, 2014, he was waived.

=== Houston Texans ===
On August 29, 2014, Malena was signed to the Houston Texans' practice squad. On December 29, 2014, Malena signed a reserve/future contract with the Texans. On May 8, 2015, he was waived.

=== Dallas Cowboys (second stint) ===
On May 15, 2015, Malena signed with the Cowboys. On September 5, 2015, he was waived.

On December 2, 2015, Malena signed to the Cowboys' practice squad. On January 4, 2016, Malena signed a reserve/future contract with the Dallas Cowboys. On May 6, 2016, he was waived.

=== Toronto Argonauts ===
On September 14, 2016, Malena signed with the Toronto Argonauts.

== Personal life ==
At Texas A&M University, Malena majored in recreation, parks, and tourism science.
