= 2013 Music City Bowl =

2013 Franklin American Mortgage Music City Bowl
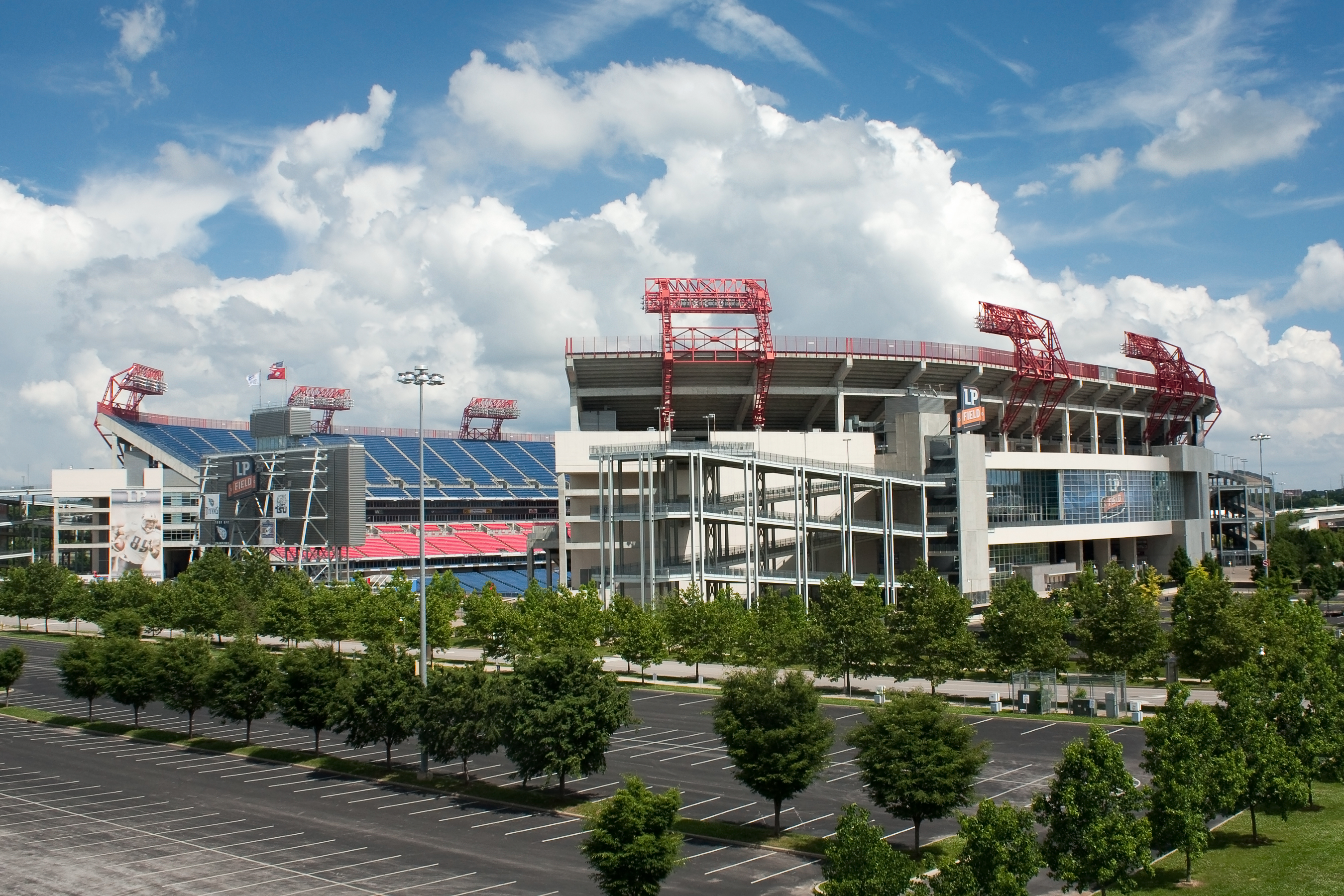
- LP Field in Nashville, Tennessee, hosted the Music City Bowl.
Ole Miss Rebels	Georgia Tech Yellow Jackets
(7–5)	(7–5)
SEC	ACC
25	17
Head coach: Hugh Freeze	Head coach: Paul Johnson
	1	2	3	4	Total
Ole Miss	7	6	10	2	25
Georgia Tech	7	0	0	10	17
- Date: December 30, 2013
- Season: 2013
- Stadium: LP Field
- Location: Nashville, Tennessee
- Favorite: Mississippi by 3
- Referee: Reggie Smith (Big XII)
- Attendance: 52,125

United States TV coverage
- Network: ESPN
- Announcers: Mark Jones (Play-by-Play); Brock Huard (Analyst); Jessica Mendoza (Sidelines)

The 2013 Music City Bowl was an American college football bowl game that was played on December 30, 2013, at LP Field in Nashville, Tennessee. The 16th edition of the Music City Bowl began at 2:15 p.m. CST and was broadcast on ESPN. It featured the Ole Miss Rebels from the Southeastern Conference against the Georgia Tech Yellow Jackets from the Atlantic Coast Conference. It was one of the 2013–14 bowl games that concluded the 2013 FBS football season. The game was sponsored by the Franklin American Mortgage Company and was officially known as the Franklin American Mortgage Music City Bowl. Ole Miss defeated Georgia Tech by a score of 25–17.

== Teams ==
The two teams had met three times previously, with Georgia Tech holding a 2–1 lead and with each team winning a bowl game. In total bowl appearances, Ole Miss had a 22–12 record and Georgia Tech was 23–18.

=== Ole Miss ===
This season, Ole Miss set a new school record for yards in a season. Leading the team has been junior quarterback Bo Wallace, who is ranked 26th nationally in total offense (279.9 ypg) and in passing (257.5 ypg).

=== Georgia Tech ===
The Yellow Jackets have the 6th leading rushing attack with 311.7 yards per game. The team has scored 36.6 points per game, third best in the conference and 22nd nationally, and second-best in the program's modern era. Senior DE Jeremiah Attaochu is leading the defense with a career 31 sacks, just shy of breaking the school's career record. Offensively, the leader is senior A-back Robert Godhigh, recipient of the ACC's 2013 Brian Piccolo Award, who has gained 1,114 yards from scrimmage (694 rush, 420 catch) and his average of 12.4 yards per play leads the FBS.

== Game summary ==
=== Scoring summary ===
Scoring summary

Quarter	Time	Drive			Team	Scoring information	Score	
Quarter	Time	Plays	Yards	TOP	Team	Scoring information	Ole Miss	Georgia Tech
1	10:15	15	75	4:45	MISS	Bo Wallace 17-yard touchdown run, Andrew Ritter kick good	7	0
1	4:27	14	74	5:48	GT	Robert Godhigh 8-yard touchdown run, Harrison Butker kick good	7	7
2	7:59	4	38	1:19	MISS	Donte Moncrief 28-yard touchdown reception from Wallace, Ritter kick no good (blocked)	13	7
3	8:13	5	44	1:29	MISS	Wallace 10-yard touchdown run, Ritter kick good	20	7
3	3:00	7	76	3:02	MISS	29-yard field goal by Ritter	23	7
4	14:43	10	64	3:17	GT	38-yard field goal by Butker	23	10
4	13:25	1	72	0:11	GT	Darren Waller 72-yard touchdown reception from Vad Lee, Butker kick good	23	17
4	4:22	1	-20	0:14	MISS	Corey Dennis fumbled, recovered by Ray Beno in the endzone for a SAFETY.	25	17
"TOP" = time of possession. For other American football terms, see Glossary of American football.							25	17

=== Statistics ===
Statistics	Ole Miss	Georgia Tech
First downs	28	18
Total offense, plays – yards	84–477	66–298
Rushes-yards (net)	48–221	49–151
Passing yards (net)	256	147
Passes, Comp-Att-Int	23–36–1	5–17–1
Time of Possession	32:50	27:10
