= History of Texas Tech Red Raiders football =

The history of Texas Tech Red Raiders football covers 95 seasons since the team began play as the "Matadors" in 1925.

== Overview ==
=== Early history (1925–1974) ===
Texas Tech played its first intercollegiate football game on October 3, 1925. The contest, against McMurry University, ended in a controversial scoreless tie during the Panhandle South Plains Fair. Tech's Elson Archibald seemed to have kicked a game-winning 20-yard field goal but the referee ruled that the clock had run out before the score. It was later reported that the referee made the call to get revenge because he wanted to be the team's first head coach but the job was instead given to Ewing Y. Freeland.

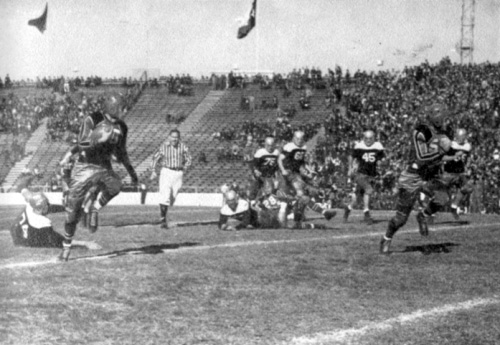
The 1939 Cotton Bowl Classic

Over his four years, Freeland coached the team, known at the time as the Matadors, to 21–10–6 before handing the reins to Grady Higginbotham. The freshman team was named the Picadors. Higgenbotham coached for one year, 1929, which saw only one win and two ties to seven losses. His winning percentage of .200 is the worst of any Texas Tech football coach. Pete W. Cawthon replaced Higginbotham in 1930 and led the team for the next eleven seasons. His winning percentage of .693 has not been surpassed at Texas Tech.

For its first seven years, the program was independent, not belonging to an athletic conference. It was during Cawthon's service—in 1932—that Tech first joined a conference, the Border Intercollegiate Athletic Association, which included five other schools at the time. Several other firsts occurred during Cawthon's tenure. In 1934, the team was first referred to as the "Red Raiders". Three years later, the 1937 squad became the first team in college football to fly to a game. Later that year, they received their first postseason invite—to the 1937 Sun Bowl, where they were defeated by West Virginia, 7–6. The following year, Cawthon led the team, which is the only one in the program's history to have an undefeated regular season, to the Cotton Bowl Classic where they lost to St. Mary's, 20–13. Cawthon's 1939 team set a still-unbroken NCAA record for most punts during a single game. Playing in a driving rainstorm, Texas Tech punted 39 times, while their opponent, Centenary punted 38 times. The combined punt total of 77 is also an unbroken NCAA record.

Texas Tech's acceptance into the Southwest Conference headlines the Lubbock Avalanche-Journal, 1956

The next two coaches after Cawthon each held the position for a decade. Dell Morgan started in 1941, garnering a 55–49–3 record which included three bowl appearances that ended in losses. In 1951, DeWitt T. Weaver started his run. At the end of it, he held a record of 49–51–5. During his time, Weaver coached the Red Raiders to their initial bowl victories. The first came against Pacific in 1952 Sun Bowl. The next came two years later in the Gator Bowl. The 1953 Gator Bowl, a 35–13 win over Auburn, is most memorable for the first official public appearance of The Masked Rider:

According to reports from those present at the 1954 Gator Bowl, the crowd sat in stunned silence as they watched [student Joe Kirk] Fulton and Blackie rush onto the football field, followed by the team. After a few moments of stunned disbelief, the silent crowd burst into cheers. Ed Danforth, a writer for the Atlanta Journal and a press box spectator later wrote, "No team in any bowl game ever made a more sensational entrance."

Texas Tech withdrew from the Border Intercollegiate Athletic Association in 1956 and was independent for the ensuing three years. The school had tried eight times to gain admittance to the Southwest Conference and had been denied. After the 1952 rejection, many Tech fans cut up their Neiman Marcus charge cards and mailed them back to the Dallas-based retailer. Legend holds that, in response, Stanley Marcus helped sway SMU's vote in Tech's favor.

J. T. King became the coach of the Red Raiders in 1961. In his nine years, he fared no better nor worse than the man he replaced. With 44 wins, 45 losses, and three ties, his winning percentage of .495 was very close to Weaver's .490. One of the wins under King was on September 18, 1965, when the Red Raiders beat Kansas, 26–7, in the first intercollegiate football game to use instant video replay. King led the team to two bowl games but they were both losses. The win column saw an upswing under coach Jim Carlen (1970–74) who finished his five years with a winning record of .644. The team's second postseason win came under Carlen when Tech beat Tennessee in the 1973 Gator Bowl.

=== Steve Sloan era (1975–1977) ===
The Texas Tech University athletic department offered Steve Sloan the head football coaching position in January 1975. Though Sloan originally declined, he took the job on January 2, 1975. Texas Tech was believed to have offered him a US$30,000 per year contract, as well as $11,000 from television show income. He took five of his assistant coaches with him to the Red Raiders program, including defensive coordinator Bill Parcells. In his three seasons with Texas Tech, Sloan compiled a 23–12 record.

The only bowl tie in the program's history came the following year in the Peach Bowl, 6–6 vs. Vanderbilt. The Red Raiders were not invited to a bowl in 1975 but returned to postseason play in 1976, losing to Nebraska by three in the Bluebonnet Bowl. Tech's appearance in 1977 Tangerine Bowl, where they lost 40–17 to Florida State, was to be the last time the team saw postseason play for nearly a decade.

=== Rex Dockery era (1978–1980) ===
Rex Dockery was promoted from offensive coordinator to head coach following Sloan's departure, the program would, for the second time in its history, enter into a period of two successive coaches who would return overall losing records. This led to Dockery's firing as Texas Tech's head coach. In three years, Dockery coached the Red Raiders to 15–16–2.

=== Jerry Moore era (1981–1985) ===
Jerry Moore took the position in 1981. During his five years, he posted the second-worst record of any Texas Tech football coach, only .309. The final tally, though, only tells part of the story since many of the losses came in close games. In 1982, #1 Washington, playing at home, beat the Red Raiders by only a single touchdown. Later in the season, #2 SMU was also only able to squeak by on a single touchdown. In Moore's final season, four of Tech's seven losses were by a combined six points.

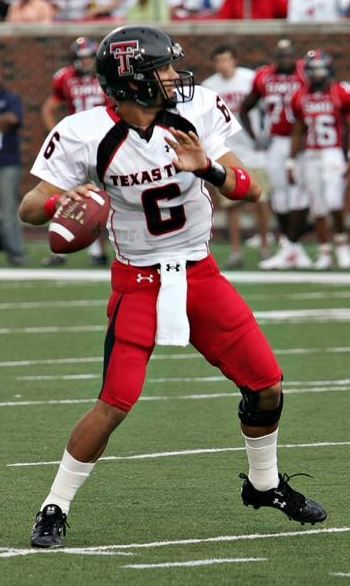
Graham Harrell

=== David McWilliams era (1986) ===
Upon Moore's release, the job was given to David McWilliams. In spite of not even staying an entire season, he was able to garner a record of .636 and return the team to postseason play. McWilliams departed to become the head coach at Texas.

=== Spike Dykes era (1987–1999) ===
Spike Dykes took over at Tech just before the 1986 Independence Bowl where the Red Raiders were edged out, 20–17, by Ole Miss. Dykes' bowl game and the 13 complete seasons that followed set a record as the longest stay for any Texas Tech football coach. Although tallying 67 losses and a tie, his 82 wins also set a record as the most victories for a single Tech football coach. It was in 1996, during Dykes's tenure, that Texas Tech joined the Big 12 Conference. The team had the distinction of being the only one in the Big 12 to have a winning season each year since the conference was created, suffering their first losing season in 2011.

=== Mike Leach era (2000–2009) ===
When Dykes departed in 2000, Texas Tech hired Mike Leach, who eventually became the winningest coach in school history. He is also the school's all-time winningest coach in postseason play, competing in a bowl game each year during his stay and garnering a 5–3 record. Behind only the Texas Longhorns, the Red Raiders are second in the Big 12 for postseason wins since 2000, having won six of their last ten bowl games. In the 2006 Insight Bowl, the team defeated the Minnesota Golden Gophers, overcoming a 31-point deficit in the third quarter to beat their opponent by three in overtime. This made NCAA Division I FBS (formerly I-A) history as the largest come-from-behind bowl victory ever recorded.

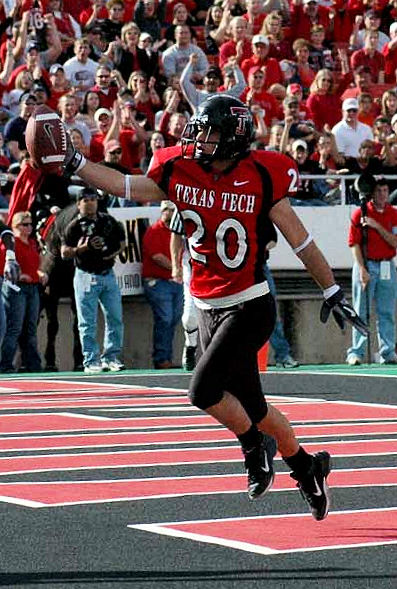
Danny Amendola

Each year since 2001, the American Football Coaches Association has recognized Texas Tech for having a team graduation rate of at least 70 percent. The Graduation Success Rate figures released by the NCAA in October 2008 showed that Tech graduated 79% of its players during the period from 1998 to 2001. This placed it third among the 25 teams ranked in the USA Today Coaches' Poll at the time the data was released. Only No. 23 Vanderbilt and No. 19 Wake Forest ranked higher. It also placed Texas Tech at the top of the Big 12, followed by Nebraska (78%), Baylor (78%), Colorado (75%), Kansas State (67%), Oklahoma State (62%), Missouri (59%), Texas A&M (56%), Iowa State (55%), Kansas (53%), Texas (50%), and Oklahoma (46%).

In July 2007, ESPN ranked all 119 FBS (formerly 1-A) football programs on performance from 1997 to 2006 and placed Texas Tech at number 32. Also, with 13, the Red Raiders rank fourth nationally in consecutive winning seasons, trailing only Florida State (30), Florida (19), and Virginia Tech (14). Described as a program on the rise, the Red Raiders earned 56 wins from the 2000 season through the 2006 season. During the same period, only three other Big 12 teams had more victories—Oklahoma, Texas, and Nebraska.

The Red Raiders, with returning quarterback Graham Harrell and redshirt freshman wide receiver Michael Crabtree opened the 2007 season in Dallas on September 3, 2007, with a televised game against SMU. Texas Tech defeated the Mustangs, 49–9. After a 45–49 loss to the Oklahoma State Cowboys in the fourth game of the season, defensive coordinator Lyle Setencich resigned and was replaced by Ruffin McNeill, who took the position on an interim basis. The season ended with a 34–27 upset of the #3 Oklahoma Sooners, an 8–4 record, and an invitation to the Gator Bowl, where Tech defeated the Virginia Cavaliers, 31–28, on an Alex Trlica field goal with seven seconds remaining.

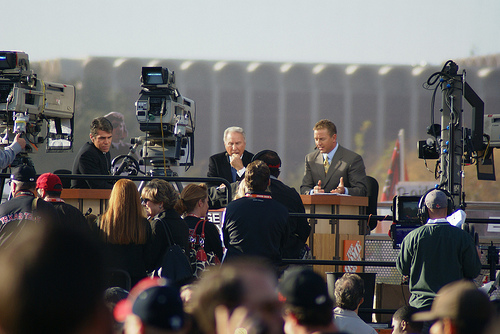
College GameDay broadcasting from Texas Tech on November 1, 2008

Prior to the 2008 season, Ruffin McNeill was made the Red Raider's full-time defensive coordinator. The team remained undefeated for the first 10 games of the season and, on November 1, 2008, the Red Raiders (ranked #5 in the Coaches' Poll, #6 in the AP Poll, and #7 in the BCS Rankings defeated the #1 (in all polls) Texas Longhorns. A pass from Graham Harrell to All-American wide receiver Michael Crabtree with 8 seconds remaining in the game led Tech to a 39–33 victory. This marked the 500th win in program history and the first win over a #1 ranked team. Billed as the most significant game in Texas Tech history, the game was broadcast nationwide on ABC. It was the fifth-most viewed telecast of any regular-season game in ABC history, drawing a 7.5 rating, meaning an average of 8.59 million households tuned into the contest during each measurable segment. It also attracted the largest home crowd in school history. The win also catapulted the Red Raiders to the number-two spot in both major polls, as well as the BCS rankings (and as high as number one in some computer rankings). They also became the second Red Raider team to win eleven games in the regular season. However, Tech would go on to lose two games—a conference matchup at Oklahoma and the Cotton Bowl Classic versus Ole Miss.

A March 2009 announcement stated that Texas Tech and Baylor would move their next two games to the Dallas metropolitan area. The schools played November 28, 2009, at Cowboys Stadium in Arlington and will play again on October 9, 2010, at the Cotton Bowl Stadium during the State Fair of Texas. There is also an option to extend the arrangement for an additional two years.

On December 30, 2009, Texas Tech fired head coach Mike Leach for allegedly mistreating Adam James, an injured player. Leach's record at Tech stands at 84–43. Following Leach's departure, Defensive Coordinator Ruffin McNeill was named the interim head coach and led the team to a 41–31 victory over the Michigan State Spartans at the 2010 Alamo Bowl. Texas Tech finished the 2009 season ranked #21 in the AP poll, and #23 in the USA Today poll.

=== Tommy Tuberville era (2010–2012) ===
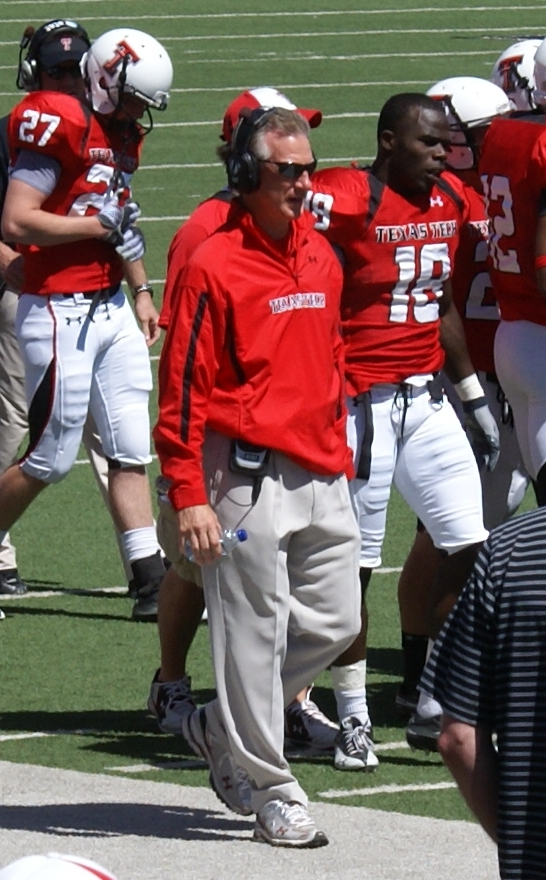
Tuberville during the 2011 Texas Tech Red Raiders Spring Game

On January 9, 2010, former Auburn head football coach Tommy Tuberville was named the new head coach for the Red Raiders. On January 12, 2010, Neal Brown, from Troy was selected as the new offensive coordinator.

On January 1, 2011, Tuberville became the second head coach in Texas Tech football history to win a bowl game in his first season—an accomplishment unmatched since DeWitt Weaver's first season in 1951–52. On January 18, 2011, Texas Tech announced that Tuberville received a one-year contract extension and a $500,000 per year raise. The extension and raise gave Tuberville a $2 million per-year salary through the 2015 season. At the beginning of Tuberville's first year at Texas Tech, season ticket sales increased from the previous record of 30,092 to 46,546. Additionally, Tuberville is responsible for the highest-rated recruiting class in Texas Tech history, securing the 18th-ranked recruiting class in 2011 according to Rivals.com and the 14th-ranked class in the country according to Scout.com.

On November 10, 2012, during a game against the Kansas Jayhawks, Tuberville became involved in a dispute with graduate assistant Kevin Oliver. Tuberville touched him and knocked off both Oliver's hat and his headset. After the game, Tuberville initially explained the incident by stating that he was aiming for Oliver's shirt in an attempt to pull him off the field. Two days later in his weekly press conference Tuberville apologized, citing his desire to set a better example for his two sons, one of whom was on the team.

Although Tuberville continued to run Leach's wide-open "Air Raid" spread offense, he was never really embraced by a fan base still smarting over the popular Leach's ouster. After 3 seasons and a 21–17 record, 9–17 in Big 12 play, Tuberville departed Tech to become head coach at Cincinnati Bearcats.

=== Kliff Kingsbury era (2013–2018) ===
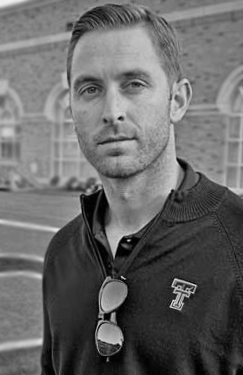
Kingsbury during open practice in 2013

Kliff Kingsbury, a former Texas Tech quarterback who was serving as the offensive coordinator at Texas A&M, was hired to replace Tuberville as Tech's next head coach.

Kingsbury completed his first season as Head Coach in 2013 with an 8–5 record and a Holiday Bowl Victory. Kingsbury became the first Big 12 Conference coach to begin his career with 7 straight wins. The season saw the departure of assistant coach/ Co-Offensive Coordinator and former Texas Tech quarterback Sonny Cumbie, as he would become the next Offensive Coordinator for the Horned Frogs at TCU. Tight end Jace Amaro was also named as a Consensus All-American, and the first Red Raider to be selected as such since Michael Crabtree in 2008. Kingsbury made his head coaching debut August 30, 2013 with a 41–23 victory over the SMU Mustangs. Kingsbury chose walk-on true freshman quarterback Baker Mayfield for the starting role at the position, and Mayfield was named Big 12 Offensive Player of the Week for his performance. Mayfield is believed to be the first walk-on true freshman to start a season opener for a BCS school. Baker Mayfield was later supplanted by Davis Webb, another true freshman quarterback, due to a knee injury during the Kansas game. Following Webb's first start against Iowa State, Webb was also named Big 12 Offensive Player of the Week. Texas Tech became the only school in the Big 12 Conference to have had three different freshman quarterbacks win the award, with the first being Kingsbury himself in 1999.

The Red Raiders made their first Associated Press Top 25 debut in the Kingsbury era following a win over TCU on September 12, 2013. It was the earliest a first year coach at Texas Tech achieved a spot in the rankings. Kingsbury also became the first coach in Texas Tech history to start the season 6–0 in their debut season after the Red Raiders defeated Iowa State on October 12, 2013. Following a victory against West Virginia on October 19, 2013, Kingsbury led the Red Raiders to a 7–0 start for only the fourth time in program history. The 10th-place ranking the team received in the BCS also marked the highest the program had been ranked since the 2008 season. With the win over West Virginia, Kingsbury became the first Big 12 coach to start his career 7–0. The Texas Tech Red Raiders finished Kliff Kingsbury's first year at Texas Tech by losing the last 5 games of the season, finishing the rookie coach's first regular season at 7–5. Tight end Jace Amaro was also named as a Consensus All-American, the first Red Raider to be selected as such since Michael Crabtree in 2008. Kingsbury and the Red Raiders capped off the season with a 37–23 upset over the #14 ranked Arizona State in the 2013 Holiday Bowl following an impressive performance by quarterback Davis Webb. Two of Kingsbury's players would be selected in the 2014 NFL draft, Amaro and Will Smith.

On August 29, 2014, Kingsbury received a $1 million raise to $3.5 million and a contract extension through 2020. The extension will see Kingsbury's salary rise by $200,000 a year to a maximum of $5.5 million in 2020. The extension was given following an announcement for a $185 million athletic fundraising campaign. Under Kingsbury's leadership Texas Tech sold out 2014 season tickets for the first time since Texas Tech's inaugural 1925 season. The 2014 team struggled with numerous injuries, finishing 4–8 on the season.

The Red Raiders made numerous changes heading into the 2015 season. Kingsbury added defensive coordinator David Gibbs hoping to bolster a defense that ranked amongst the worst in the country. The Red Raiders rebounded with a strong season as running back DeAndré Washington finished with 1,492 yards and 16 touchdowns and Patrick Mahomes finished with 4,653 yards and 36 passing touchdowns. Although the offense rebounded quite nicely and finished the season in the top 3 nationally, the defense finished 2nd to last only better than Kansas. Kingsbury finished his 3rd season with signature wins at Arkansas and at Texas showing promise heading into 2016. The 2015 season concluded at 7–6, 4–5 in Big 12 play good for a 5th-place finish. Tech lost in the Texas Bowl to LSU. Three of Kingsbury's players were selected in the 2016 NFL draft, Le'Raven Clark, DeAndré Washington, and Jakeem Grant.

The Red Raiders finished 2016 5–7, 3–6 in Big 12 play. The team disappointed with a conference wins against Kansas, TCU, and Baylor and finished in 8th place in the Big 12. The Red Raiders finished the 2016 season with a 55–34 victory over Baylor, snapping a 5-game losing streak they had against the Bears, that spanned from prior to Kingsbury's days in Lubbock. The 2016 team finished with the 6th best offense and the worst defense in Division I FBS. Patrick Mahomes was the lone Red Raider drafted after a disappointing campaign going in the first round #10 overall to the Kansas City Chiefs.

The Red Raiders entered a make or break season in 2017 for coach Kingsbury. The team responded positively finishing the 2017 season improved from the prior season finishing 6–7, 3–6 in Big 12 play. The team showed signs of improvement as the offense finishing #16 in the country overcoming the loss of first round pick Patrick Mahomes. The defense also showed signs of improvement jumping up to #59 overall, a vast improvement for a defense that was the worst in the NCAA the prior season. At the conclusion of the season Athletic Director Kirby Hocutt confirmed that Kingsbury would be returning for his 6th season as the Red Raiders coach.

However, after suffering a third straight losing season in 2018, Hocutt announced that Kingsbury would not be returning for a seventh season.

=== Matt Wells era (2019–2021) ===
Texas Tech named Matt Wells as the Head Football Coach of the Red Raiders beginning with the 2019 season. Wells came to Texas Tech from Utah State, where he had been Head Football Coach for six seasons (2013-2018), compiling a 44–34 record including two bowl wins, one division championship, and two 10-win seasons. In his inaugural game at the helm of the Red Raiders program on August 31, 2019, Wells led Texas Tech to a 45–10 victory over Montana State in the season opener at Jones AT&T Stadium.
