= 2013 Texas Tech Red Raiders football team =

American college football season

2013 Texas Tech Red Raiders football

Holiday Bowl champion

Holiday Bowl, W 37–23 vs. Arizona State
- Conference: Big 12 Conference
- Record: 8–5 (4–5 Big 12)
- Head coach: Kliff Kingsbury (1st season)
- Co-offensive coordinators: Sonny Cumbie (1st season); Eric Morris (1st season)
- Offensive scheme: Air raid
- Defensive coordinator: Matt Wallerstedt (1st season)
- Co-defensive coordinator: Mike Smith (1st season)
- Base defense: Multiple
- Home stadium: Jones AT&T Stadium

2013 Big 12 Conference football standings
	Conf.			Overall
Team	W		L	W		L
No. 13 Baylor $	8	–	1	11	–	2
No. 6 Oklahoma %	7	–	2	11	–	2
No. 17 Oklahoma State	7	–	2	10	–	3
Texas	7	–	2	8	–	5
Kansas State	5	–	4	8	–	5
Texas Tech	4	–	5	8	–	5
TCU	2	–	7	4	–	8
West Virginia	2	–	7	4	–	8
Iowa State	2	–	7	3	–	9
Kansas	1	–	8	3	–	9
$ – BCS representative as conference champion; % – BCS at-large representative; Rankings from AP Poll

The 2013 Texas Tech Red Raiders football team represented Texas Tech University in the 2013 NCAA Division I FBS football season as members of the Big 12 Conference. Kliff Kingsbury led the Red Raiders in his first season as the program's fifteenth head coach. The Red Raiders played home games on the university's campus in Lubbock, Texas at Jones AT&T Stadium.

At the end of the 2012 regular season, Head coach Tommy Tuberville resigned to take the same position with the Cincinnati Bearcats. Former Red Raider quarterback, Houston Cougars offensive coordinator, and Texas A&M Aggies offensive coordinator Kliff Kingsbury was hired as the new head coach prior to the 2013 season.

Following the conclusion of the regular season, the Associated Press named tight end Jace Amaro, offensive tackle Le'Raven Clark, and linebacker Will Smith to their first team selections. Defensive tackle Kerry Hyder and wide receiver Eric Ward were selected for the second team. Jace Amaro additionally earned Unanimous All-American honors from many organizations and broke the single season tight end receiving yards record in a 37–23 upset over #14 Arizona State in the 2013 Holiday Bowl. Despite having two true freshman quarterbacks start every game, the Red Raiders ended the season as the number-two-ranked passing offense in the NCAA Football Bowl Subdivision (FBS) with 392.8 yards per game, just behind Fresno State's 394.8 yards per game.

== Preseason ==
=== Award watch lists ===
- Outland Trophy – Kerry Hyder, Le'Raven Clark
- Bronko Nagurski Trophy – Kerry Hyder
- Lombardi Award – Kerry Hyder, Le'Raven Clark
- Fred Biletnikoff Award – Eric Ward, Jace Amaro
- Earl Campbell Tyler Rose Award – Eric Ward
- Ted Hendricks Award – Kerry Hyder

=== Preseason All-Big 12 ===
- TE Jace Amaro
- WR Eric Ward
- OL Le'Raven Clark
- DL Kerry Hyder

=== Coaching changes ===
- Head coach/OC: Kliff Kingsbury replaces Tommy Tuberville and offensive coordinator Neal Brown
- Defensive coordinator: Matt Wallerstedt replaces Art Kaufman
- Linebackers: Mike Smith (additionally Co-DC) replaces Robert Prunty
- Outside Receivers: Sonny Cumbie (additionally promoted to Co-OC) replaces Tommy Mainord
- Inside Receivers: Eric Morris (additionally Co-OC) replaces Sonny Cumbie
- Defensive line: John Scott Jr. replaces Fred Tate
- Offensive line: Lee Hays replaces Chris Thomsen
- Defensive backs/safeties: Trey Haverty and Kevin Curtis replace John Lovett and Robert Prunty
- Running backs: Mike Jinks replaces Chad Scott
- Special teams: Trey Haverty replaces Tommy Tuberville
- Strength and Conditioning: Chad Dennis replaces Joe Walker

== Schedule ==
Date	Time	Opponent	Rank	Site	TV	Result	Attendance
August 30	7:00 pm	at SMU*		Gerald J. Ford Stadium; University Park, TX	ESPN	W 41–23	34,790
September 7	6:00 pm	Stephen F. Austin*		Jones AT&T Stadium; Lubbock, TX	FSN (Note: Stephen F. Austin–Texas Tech game was shown live on the following Fox Sports Networks (FSN) affiliates: Fox College Sports Central; Fox Sports Detroit Plus; Fox Sports Midwest Plus; Fox Sports North Plus; Fox Sports Ohio Plus; Fox Sports Southwest Plus; Fox Sports Wisconsin; MASN2; MSG Plus; Prime Ticket)	W 61–13	54,086
September 12	6:30 pm	No. 24 TCU		Jones AT&T Stadium; Lubbock, TX (rivalry)	ESPN	W 20–10	58,701
September 21	6:00 pm	Texas State*	No. 25	Jones AT&T Stadium; Lubbock, TX	FSN (Note: Texas State–Texas Tech game is shown on the following Fox Sports Networks (FSN) affiliates: Fox Sports Detroit Plus; Fox Sports Florida; Fox Sports Kansas City; Fox Sports North; Fox Sports Southwest Plus; MASN2; MSG Plus; Prime Ticket; SportSouth; Sun Sports)	W 33–7	60,997
October 5	11:00 am	at Kansas	No. 20	Memorial Stadium; Lawrence, KS	FS1	W 54–16	25,648
October 12	11:00 am	Iowa State^{†}	No. 20	Jones AT&T Stadium; Lubbock, TX	FS1	W 42–35	57,367
October 19	11:00 am	at West Virginia	No. 16	Mountaineer Field; Morgantown, WV	FS1	W 37–27	54,084
October 26	2:30 pm	at No. 17 Oklahoma	No. 10	Gaylord Family Oklahoma Memorial Stadium; Norman, OK	FOX	L 30–38	84,734
November 2	6:00 pm	No. 18 Oklahoma State	No. 15	Jones AT&T Stadium; Lubbock, TX	FOX	L 34–52	61,836^{^A}
November 9	11:00 am	Kansas State	No. 25	Jones AT&T Stadium; Lubbock, TX	ABC	L 26–49	54,609
November 16	6:00 pm	vs. No. 4 Baylor		AT&T Stadium; Arlington, TX (rivalry)	FOX	L 34–63	69,188
November 28	6:30 pm	at Texas		Darrell K Royal–Texas Memorial Stadium; Austin, TX (rivalry)	FS1	L 16–41	100,668
December 30	9:15 pm	vs. No. 16 Arizona State*		Qualcomm Stadium; San Diego, CA (Holiday Bowl)	ESPN	W 37–23	52,930
*Non-conference game; ^{†}Homecoming; Rankings from AP Poll released prior to the game; All times are in Central time

- ^ADenotes the largest crowd to watch a football game at Jones AT&T Stadium

== Roster ==
2013 Texas Tech Red Raiders football team roster
Players
Coaches
Offense

Pos.	#	Name	Class
TE	23	Jace Amaro	Jr
WR	84	Zach Austin	Fr
QB	8	Collin Bowen	Fr
QB	16	Michael Brewer	So
OL	65	Baylen Brown	Fr
WR	14	Dylan Cantrell	Fr
OL	72	Beau Carpenter	Jr
OL	62	Le'Raven Clark	So
WR	9	Shawn Corker	Jr
WR	85	Jordan Davis	Jr
WR	2	Reginald Davis	Fr
WR	35	Brandon Defrance	Sr
WR	19	Derrick Edwards	So
WR	80	Grant Eubank	Fr
WR	87	Aaron Fisher	Sr
OL	71	Rashard Fortenberry	Sr
RB	8	Sadale Foster	Sr
WR	11	Jakeem Grant	So
RB	40	Rodney Hall	So
OL	70	Cody Hayes	Fr
WR	89	Jacob Hurla	Jr
OL	75	Jared Kaster	So
OL	77	Trey Keenan	Fr
WR	4	Bradley Marquez	Jr
QB	6	Baker Mayfield	Fr
OL	66	Ryan Messir	Fr
RB	24	Tyler Middleton	Jr
WR	82	Brent Mitcham	Jr
WR	5	Gary Moore	Fr
OL	56	Alfredo Morales	So
OL	51	Tony Morales	So
QB	15	Clayton Nicholas	Fr
FB	33	Omar Ontiveros	Sr
OL	58	Josh Outlaw	Fr
WR	83	Brad Pearson	So
WR	3	D. J. Polite-Bray	Fr
OL	63	James Polk	Jr
OL	61	Emiliano Renteria	Fr
OL	78	Blake Snider	So
RB	29	Josh Talbott	Sr
OL	79	Poet Thomas	Fr
WR	13	Carlos Thompson	Fr
WR	18	Eric Ward	Sr
RB	21	DeAndré Washington	So
QB	7	Davis Webb	Fr
RB	49	Armond Weh-Weh	Fr
WR	88	Hunter Weishuhn	Fr
WR	28	Dominique Wheeler	Fr
OL	74	Joey White	Jr
RB	37	Quinton White	Fr
RB	34	Kenny Williams	Jr
WR	86	Peyton Williams	Fr
OL	67	Matt Wilson	So

Defense

Pos.	#	Name	Class
DL	51	Demetrius Alston	So
LB	18	Micah Awe	So
DB	32	Brandon Bagley	Jr
DB	19	Jalen Barnes	Fr
LB	12	Zach Barnes	Fr
LB	1	Terrance Bullitt	Sr
DL	54	Dartwan Bush	Sr
DB	16	Dorian Crawford	Jr
LB	13	Sam Eguavoen	Jr
LB	37	Bobby Esiaba	So
DB	29	Olaoluwa Falemi	Sr
DB	3	J. J. Gaines	So
DB	28	Martin Hill	Jr
DB	38	Summitt Hogue	So
DL	91	Kerry Hyder	Sr
LB	9	Branden Jackson	So
DB	20	Tanner Jacobson	Fr
LB	41	Malik Jenkins	Fr
DB	24	Bruce Jones	Sr
DL	46	Chris Knighton	Sr
LB	11	Jacarthy Mack	Fr
DB	4	Derrick Mays	Sr
DB	31	Justis Nelson	Fr
DB	14	La'Darius Newbold	Fr
DB	36	Thierry Nguema	Fr
DL	92	Bennett Ofor	Jr
DB	17	Dee Paul	Fr
DL	94	Donte Phillips	So
DB	5	Tre' Porter	Sr
DB	23	Jeremy Reynolds	So
DL	43	Jackson Richards	Jr
LB	10	Pete Robertson	So
LB	2	Andre Ross	So
LB	50	Tyler Scalzi	Fr
DL	98	Anthony Smith	Fr
LB	7	Will Smith	Sr
DB	30	Austin Stewart	Jr
DB	15	Keenon Ward	Fr
DL	96	Dennell Wesley	Sr
DB	26	John White	So
LB	6	Kris Williams	Fr
LB	27	Zach Winbush	Jr
LB	39	Kahlee Woods	Fr
DB	45	Caleb Woodward	Fr

Special teams

Pos.	#	Name	Class
DS	52	Parker Bradham	Fr
DS	57	David Brenner	So
K	48	Ryan Bustin	Jr
P	26	Ryan Erxleben	Sr
K	45	Kramer Fyfe	Jr
K	42	Tyler Symmank	So

Head coach

- Kliff Kingsbury

Coordinators/assistant coaches

- Kliff Kingsbury Offensive coordinator
- Sonny Cumbie Co-offensive coordinator/Outside receivers
- Eric Morris Co-offensive coordinator
- Matt Wallerstedt Defensive coordinator
- Mike Smith Co-defensive coordinator/Outside linebackers
- Kevin Curtis Defensive backs
- Trey Haverty Outside linebackers
- Lee Hays Offensive line
- Mike Jinks Running backs
- John Scott Jr. Defensive line
- Chad Dennis Strength and conditioning
- Zach Kittley Student assistant

Legend

- (C) Team captain
- (S) Suspended
- (I) Ineligible
- Injured
- Redshirt

Roster

== Game summaries ==
=== At SMU ===
Texas Tech Red Raiders at SMU Mustangs – Game summary

Quarter	1	2	3	4	Total
Red Raiders	3	10	7	21	41
Mustangs	3	6	7	7	23

at Gerald J. Ford Stadium, University Park, Texas

- Date: August 30
- Game time: 7:00 p.m. CDT
- Game weather: Temperature: 101 °F (38 °C) • Weather: partly cloudy • Wind: SSE 5 MPH
- Game attendance: 34,790
- Referee: David Alvarez
- TV announcers (ESPN): Carter Blackburn (play-by-play), Danny Kanell (analyst) and Allison Williams (sideline)
- Box score, Recap

Game information

First quarter

- TTU – Ryan Bustin 43-yard field goal, 10:23. Red Raiders 3–0. Drive: 14 plays, 49 yards, 4:37.
- SMU – Chase Hover 27-yard field goal, 5:15. Tied 3–3. Drive: 14 plays, 72 yards, 5:08.

Second quarter

- TTU – Ryan Bustin 27-yard field goal, 13:34. Red Raiders 6–3. Drive: 10 plays, 64 yards, 3:16.
- SMU – Chase Hover 34-yard field goal, 5:24. Tied 6–6. Drive: 5 plays, 45 yards, 1:40.
- TTU – Jordan Davis 33-yard pass from Baker Mayfield (Ryan Bustin kick), 1:01. Red Raiders 13–6. Drive: 6 plays, 72 yards, 1:51.
- SMU – Chase Hover 51-yard field goal, 0:00. Red Raiders 13–9. Drive: 6 plays, 41 yards, 1:01.

Third quarter

- TTU – Bradley Marquez 10-yard pass from Baker Mayfield (Ryan Bustin kick), 7:53. Red Raiders 20–9. Drive: 13 plays, 80 yards, 3:23.
- SMU – Garrett Gilbert 23-yard run (Chase Hover kick), 5:38. Red Raiders 20–16. Drive: 8 plays, 81 yards, 2:15.

Fourth quarter

- TTU – Baker Mayfield 11-yard run (Ryan Bustin kick), 10:05. Red Raiders 27–16. Drive: 11 plays, 78 yards, 2:59.
- TTU – Jakeem Grant 3-yard pass from Baker Mayfield (Ryan Bustin kick), 5:40. Red Raiders 34–16. Drive: 7 plays, 70 yards, 2:28.
- TTU – Reginald Davis III 22-yard pass from Baker Mayfield (Ryan Bustin kick), 2:40. Red Raiders 41–16. Drive: 5 plays, 43 yards, 1:19.
- SMU – Prescott Line 2-yard run (Chase Hover kick), 1:05. Red Raiders 41–23. Drive: 6 plays, 75 yards, 1:35.

Top passers

- TTU – Baker Mayfield – 43/60, 413 yards, 4 TD
- SMU – Garrett Gilbert – 41/62, 388 yards

Top rushers

- TTU – Baker Mayfield – 12 rushes, 16 yards, TD
- SMU – Garrett Gilbert – 14 rushes, 53 yards, TD

Top receivers

- TTU – Eric Ward – 13 receptions, 150 yards
- SMU – Jeremy Johnson – 12 receptions, 131 yards

Texas Tech named walk-on true freshman quarterback Baker Mayfield as the starter at the position, marking the first season opening start by a true freshman in school history and the first walk-on freshman to start a season opener for a BCS team. In the victory, Mayfield completed 43 of 60 passes for 413 yards and four touchdowns (to Jordan Davis, Bradley Marquez, Jakeem Grant, and Reginald Davis), and he also ran for a touchdown in the second half. Mayfield's performance came close to breaking the Texas Tech single game freshman passing yard record set by Billy Joe Tolliver, and was only 4 completions away from the NCAA record for single game pass completions by a freshman. Mayfield was named Big 12 Offensive Player of the Week for his performance.

=== Stephen F. Austin ===
Stephen F. Austin Lumberjacks at Texas Tech Red Raiders – Game summary

Quarter	1	2	3	4	Total
Lumberjacks	7	0	0	6	13
Red Raiders	28	17	16	0	61

at Jones AT&T Stadium, Lubbock, Texas

- Date: September 7
- Game time: 6:00 p.m.
- Game weather: Temperature: 88 °F (31 °C) • Weather: Mostly cloudy • Wind: SE 19 MPH
- Game attendance: 54,086
- Referee: Greg Burks
- TV announcers (FSN): Brendan Burke (play-by-play), J. C. Pearson (analyst) and Lesley McCaslin (sideline)
- Box score, Recap

Game information

First quarter

- TTU – Jakeem Grant 42-yard pass from Baker Mayfield (Ryan Bustin kick), 14:08. Red Raiders 7–0. Drive: 3 plays, 63 yards, 0:52.
- TTU – Kenny Williams 1-yard run (Ryan Bustin kick), 9:08. Red Raiders 14–0. Drive: 8 plays, 59 yards, 2:36.
- SFA – Mike Brooks 75-yard pass from Tyler Boyd (Jordan Wiggs kick), 8:55. Red Raiders 14–7. Drive: 1 play, 75 yards, 0:13.
- TTU – Jace Amaro 25-yard pass from Baker Mayfield (Ryan Bustin kick), 4:27. Red Raiders 21–7. Drive: 12 plays, 77 yards, 4:28.
- TTU – Kenny Williams 18-yard run (Ryan Bustin kick), 3:44. Red Raiders 28–7. Drive: 2 plays, 26 yards, 0:29.

Second quarter

- TTU – Bradley Marquez 60-yard pass from Baker Mayfield (Ryan Bustin kick), 8:14. Red Raiders 35–7. Drive: 6 plays, 94 yards, 2:08.
- TTU – Ryan Bustin 28-yard field goal, 6:00. Red Raiders 38–7. Drive: 7 plays, 46 yards, 1:31.
- TTU – DeAndre Washington 2-yard run (Ryan Bustin kick), 0:27. Red Raiders 45–7. Drive: 12 plays, 96 yards, 3:45.

Third quarter

- TTU – Joe Minden sacked in end zone, 8:27. Red Raiders 47–7.
- TTU – Quinton White 5-yard run (Ryan Bustin kick), 8:08. Red Raiders 54–7. Drive 1 play, 5 yards, 0:19.
- TTU – Reginald Davis 23-yard pass from Davis Webb (Ryan Bustin kick), 2:05. Red Raiders 61–7. Drive: 3 plays, 66 yards, 0:44.

Fourth quarter

- SFA – Marquies Mosley 36-yard pass from Joe Minden (pass failed), 7:30. Red Raiders 61–13. Drive: 9 plays, 99 yards, 5:03.

Top passers

- SFA – Joe Minden – 13/17, 129 yards, TD, INT
- TTU – Baker Mayfield – 21/30, 367 yards, 3 TD

Top rushers

- SFA – Fred Ford – 6 rushes, 23 yards
- TTU – Quinton White – 5 rushes, 71 yards, TD

Top receivers

- SFA – Mike Brooks – 6 receptions, 100 yards, TD
- TTU – Jace Amaro – 8 receptions, 142 yards, TD

In the first home game under head coach Kliff Kingsbury, the Red Raiders dominated the FCS team from Stephen F. Austin. The start of the game was delayed by lightning in the Lubbock area. Texas Tech ended up with 731 yards of total offense as Baker Mayfield threw for 367 yards before being replaced by Davis Webb in the second half. Mayfield threw touchdown passes to Jakeem Grant, Jace Amaro, and Bradley Marquez, and Kenny Williams added a pair of first-quarter touchdown passes. DeAndre Washington and Quinton White added rushing touchdowns, and Webb threw a TD strike to Reginald Davis for the Red Raiders' final touchdown. Texas Tech broke the student attendance record with 14,915 students, almost half of the school's enrollment.

=== TCU ===
No. 24 TCU Horned Frogs at Texas Tech Red Raiders – Game summary

Quarter	1	2	3	4	Total
No. 24 Horned Frogs	0	0	3	7	10
Red Raiders	10	0	0	10	20

at Jones AT&T Stadium, Lubbock, Texas

- Date: September 12
- Game time: 6:30 p.m.
- Game weather: Temperature: 86 °F (30 °C) • Weather: Mostly cloudy • Wind: SE 12 MPH
- Game attendance: 58,701
- Referee: Reggie Smith
- TV: ESPN
- Box score, Recap

Game information

First quarter

- TTU – Kenny Williams 50-yard pass from Baker Mayfield (Ryan Bustin kick), 13:51. Red Raiders 7–0. Drive: 6 plays, 75 yards, 1:09.
- TTU – Ryan Bustin 39-yard field goal, 3:16. Red Raiders 10–0. Drive 6 plays, 28 yards, 2:26.

Second quarter

- No scoring plays

Third quarter

- TCU – Jaden Oberkrom 37-yard field goal, 6:11. Red Raiders 10–3. Drive: 10 plays, 48 yards, 3:40.
- TCU – B. J. Catalon 17-yard run (Jaden Oberkrom kick), 6:28. Tied 10–10. Drive: 9 plays, 69 yards, 4:52.
- TTU – Bradley Marquez 19-yard pass from Davis Webb (Ryan Bustin kick), 3:48. Red Raiders 17–10. Drive: 9 plays, 75 yards, 2:40.
- TTU – Ryan Bustin 37-yard field goal, 2:43. Red Raiders 20–10. Drive: 5 plays, 15 yards, 0:38.

Top passers

- TCU – Trevone Boykin – 23/36, 194 yards, 2 INT
- TTU – Baker Mayfield – 21/40, 216 yards, TD, 3 INT

Top rushers

- TCU – Trevone Boykin – 20 rushes, 101 yards
- TTU – DeAndre Washington – 8 rushes, 19 yards

Top receivers

- TCU – Brandon Carter – 5 receptions, 50 yards
- TTU – Jace Amaro – 9 receptions, 97 yards

In a Thursday night nationally televised game, the 2–0 Red Raiders faced the 1–1 Texas Christian University Horned Frogs in the opening Big 12 game for both schools. Lightning near Jones AT&T Stadium forced a delay in the kickoff for the second straight game. Texas Tech got in the scoring column first with a touchdown pass from Baker Mayfield to Kenny Williams, who took the ball 50 yards down the right sideline for the score. Texas Tech's Ryan Bustin added a 39-yard field goal to make the score 10–0 in the first quarter. Neither team scored in the second quarter. TCU got a field goal in the third quarter, and tied the score midway through the fourth quarter on a touchdown run by B.J. Catalon. An apparent punt return for a touchdown by TCU's Brandon Carter was taken away earlier in the fourth quarter after officials ruled that he had signaled a fair catch on the play. Mayfield suffered a leg injury in the second half, and Davis Webb came in at quarterback for the Red Raiders with the score tied late in the game. Webb threw what looked to be a go-ahead touchdown pass to DeAndre Washington, but officials ruled that Washington dropped the ball just short of the goal line and the touchdown was taken off the scoreboard. Webb then threw a perfect 19-yard touchdown pass to Bradley Marquez to give the Red Raiders a 17–10 lead with 3:48 remaining. Texas Tech's defense forced TCU to punt on their next possession, and the Red Raiders drove into scoring position for Ryan Bustin to add a 37-yard field goal to make the final score 20–10. Mayfield threw for 216 yards before his injury, but was intercepted three times. Jace Amaro caught 9 passes for 97 yards during the Texas Tech victory. A student attendance record of 16,092 was set during the TCU game, breaking the record of 14,915 set just one week earlier, with an overall attendance of 58,701 for the game. Texas Tech made its debut into the Associated Press Top 25 following the win over the Horned Frogs, who were playing with star defensive end Devonte Fields, who had been suspended for parts of the first two games.

=== Texas State ===
Texas State Bobcats at No. 25 Texas Tech Red Raiders – Game summary

Quarter	1	2	3	4	Total
Bobcats	0	0	7	0	7
No. 25 Red Raiders	3	10	10	10	33

at Jones AT&T Stadium, Lubbock, Texas

- Date: September 21
- Game time: 6:00 p.m.
- Game weather: Temperature: 80 °F (27 °C) • Weather: Clear • Wind: SE 5 MPH
- Game attendance: 60,997
- Referee: Charles Lewis
- TV announcers (FSN): Ron Thulin (play-by-play), Dave Lapham (analyst) and Gary Reasons (sideline)
- Box score, Recap

Game information

First quarter

- TTU – Ryan Bustin 29-yard field goal, 10:49. Red Raiders 3–0. Drive: 12 plays, 58 yards, 4:11.

Second quarter

- TTU – Will Smith 9-yard fumble return (Ryan Bustin kick), 14:28. Red Raiders 10–0.
- TTU – Ryan Bustin 21-yard field goal, 0:20. Red Raiders 13–0. Drive: 12 plays, 70 yards, 2:57.

Third quarter

- TXST – Robert Lowe 49-yard run (Will Johnson kick), 12:55. Red Raiders 13–7. Drive: 5 plays, 75 yards, 2:05.
- TTU – Eric Ward 4-yard pass from Davis Webb (Ryan Bustin kick), 11:38. Red Raiders 20–7. Drive: 5 plays, 44 yards, 1:17.
- TTU – Ryan Bustin 27-yard field goal, 6:42. Red Raiders 23–7. Drive: 9 plays, 75 yards, 2:12.

Fourth quarter

- TTU – Bradley Marquez 10-yard pass from Davis Webb (Ryan Bustin kick), 12:57. Red Raiders 30–7. Drive: 6 plays, 24 yards, 1:57.
- TTU – Ryan Bustin 36-yard field goal, 9:32. Red Raiders 33–7. Drive: 8 plays, 63 yards, 1:11.

Top passers

- TXST – Tyler Arndt – 12/23, 108 yards, INT
- TTU – Davis Webb – 19/43, 310 yards, 2 TD, 2 INT

Top rushers

- TXST – Robert Lowe – 7 rushes, 103 yards, TD
- TTU – DeAndre Washington – 10 rushes, 38 yards

Top receivers

- TXST – Isaiah Battle – 4 receptions, 52 yards
- TTU – Jace Amaro – 9 receptions, 86 yards

The Red Raiders brought a 3–0 record and #25 AP ranking into their home game against Texas State, but the Texas Tech offensive struggled early against the Bobcats. The Red Raiders got a pair of field goals by Ryan Bustin in the first half, along with a defensive touchdown from linebacker Will Smith, as they took a 13–0 halftime lead. Smith's touchdown came on a 9-yard fumble return, with the fumble caused by defensive lineman Kerry Hyder. Texas State pulled within 13–7 early in the third quarter, and the Bobcats came close to recovering an onside kick afterward. Davis Webb then threw a touchdown pass to Eric Ward to make the score 20–7. Texas Tech pulled away in the fourth quarter, with Webb throwing another touchdown pass to Bradley Marquez. Webb and Baker Mayfield both played at quarterback for the Red Raiders, with Mayfield starting the game before being replaced by Webb in the second quarter.

=== At Kansas ===
No. 20 Texas Tech Red Raiders at Kansas Jayhawks – Game summary

Quarter	1	2	3	4	Total
No. 20 Red Raiders	0	20	17	17	54
Jayhawks	10	0	0	6	16

at Memorial Stadium, Lawrence, Kansas

- Date: October 5
- Game time: 11:00 a.m.
- Game weather: Temperature: 55 °F (13 °C) • Weather: Mostly cloudy • Wind: W 11 MPH
- Game attendance: 25,648
- Referee: Alan Eck
- TV: FS1
- Box score, Recap

Game information

First quarter

- KU – Matthew Wyman 36-yard field goal, 12:13. Jayhawks 3–0. Drive: 5 plays, 25 yards, 1:46.
- KU – Jimmy Mundine 25-yard pass from Jake Heaps (Matthew Wyman kick), 7:18. Jayhawks 10–0. Drive: 9 plays, 79 yards, 4:03.

Second quarter

- TTU – Ryan Bustin 23-yard field goal, 11:20. Jayhawks 10–3. Drive: 14 plays, 71 yards, 3:30.
- TTU – Kenny Williams 1-yard run (Ryan Bustin kick), 7:46. Tied 10–10. Drive: 8 plays, 42 yards, 2:22.
- TTU – Baker Mayfield 19-yard run (Ryan Bustin kick), 5:13. Red Raiders 17–10. Drive: 2 plays, 16 yards, 0:42.
- TTU – Ryan Bustin 25-yard field goal, 0:00. Red Raiders 20–10. Drive: 9 plays, 68 yards, 3:08.

Third quarter

- TTU – DeAndre Washington 4-yard run (Ryan Bustin kick), 14:42. Red Raiders 27–10. Drive: 1 play, 4 yards, 0:04.
- TTU – Ryan Bustin 28-yard field goal, 11:46. Red Raiders 30–10. Drive: 9 plays, 51 yards, 1:53.
- TTU – DeAndre Washington 5-yard run (Ryan Bustin kick), 7:51. Red Raiders 37–10. Drive: 12 plays, 80 yards, 2:32.

Fourth quarter

- TTU – Eric Ward 25-yard pass from Davis Webb (Ryan Bustin kick), 14:49. Red Raiders 44–10. Drive: 5 plays, 50 yards, 1:15.
- TTU – Ryan Bustin 31-yard field goal, 12:16. Red Raiders 47–10. Drive: 4 plays, 7 yards, 0:40.
- TTU – Dylan Cantrell 4-yard pass from Davis Webb (Ryan Bustin kick), 10:30. Red Raiders 54–10. Drive: 3 plays, 6 yards, 1:00.
- KU – Andrew Turzilli 28-yard pass from Michael Cumming (kick failed), 7:43. Red Raiders 54–16. Drive: 6 plays, 77 yards, 2:40.

Top passers

- TTU – Baker Mayfield – 33/51, 368 yards, INT
- KU – Jake Heaps – 16/32, 189 yards, TD, INT

Top rushers

- TTU – Kenny Williams – 12 rushes, 42 yards, TD
- KU – Darrian Miller – 12 rushes, 67 yards

Top receivers

- TTU – Eric Ward – 7 receptions, 122 yards, TD
- KU – Tony Pierson – 6 receptions, 118 yards

The Texas Tech Red Raiders improved to 5–0 for the first time since 2008 with their rout of the Kansas Jayhawks, who lost their 22nd straight Big 12 game. The Jayhawks took a 10–0 lead after the first quarter, with the Red Raiders unable to get on the scoreboard until Ryan Bustin's 23-yard field goal early in the second quarter. The Red Raiders finally got rolling after that, however, scoring on a Kenny Williams touchdown run and a 19-yard touchdown run by Baker Mayfield, along with another field goal from Bustin, to make the halftime score 20–10. The Red Raiders got a pair of touchdown runs from DeAndre Washington in the third quarter, but starting quarterback Baker Mayfield was forced to leave the game in the third quarter with an injury. Backup quarterback Davis Webb tossed a pair of fourth quarter touchdown passes to senior Eric Ward and freshman Dylan Cantrell as the Red Raiders ended up posting 54 straight points, before the Jayhawks finally scored late in the game to break Texas Tech's scoring streak. Mayfield completed 33 of 51 passes for 368 yards before suffering the leg injury. With the win, the Red Raiders improved to 14–1 all time against the Jayhawks, and the Red Raiders moved up to No. 20 in the AP rankings.

=== Iowa State ===
Iowa State Cyclones at No. 20 Texas Tech Red Raiders – Game summary

Quarter	1	2	3	4	Total
Cyclones	7	14	0	14	35
No. 20 Red Raiders	14	7	7	14	42

at Jones AT&T Stadium, Lubbock, Texas

- Date: October 12
- Game time: 11:00 a.m.
- Game weather: Temperature: 60 °F (16 °C) • Weather: Clear • Wind: NNE 10 MPH
- Game attendance: 57,367
- Referee: Rick Lourniet
- TV announcers (FS1): Eric Collins (play-by-play), James Bates (analyst) and Brady Poppinga (sideline)
- Box score, Recap

Game information

First quarter

- TTU – Jakeem Grant 33-yard pass from Davis Webb (Ryan Bustin kick), 6:31. Red Raiders 7–0. Drive: 11 plays, 80 yards, 3:39.
- ISU – Jarvis West 95-yard kick return (Cole Netten kick), 6:17. Tied 7–7.
- TTU – Eric Ward 4-yard pass from Davis Webb (Ryan Bustin kick), 1:25. Red Raiders 14–7. Drive: 11 plays, 77 yards, 3:22.

Second quarter

- ISU – Aaron Wimberly 4-yard run (Cole Netten kick), 9:10. Tied 14–14. Drive: 5 plays, 33 yards, 1:56.
- TTU – Kenny Williams 1-yard run (Ryan Bustin kick), 6:26. Red Raiders 21–14. Drive: 11 plays, 86 yards, 2:44.
- ISU – Jeff Woody 3-yard run (Cole Netten kick), 2:57. Tied 21–21. Drive: 8 plays, 75 yards, 3:29.

Third quarter

- TTU – Bradley Marquez 12-yard pass from Davis Webb (Ryan Bustin kick), 7:01. Red Raiders 28–21. Drive: 11 plays, 77 yards, 2:58.

Fourth quarter

- TTU – DeAndre Washington 12-yard run (Ryan Bustin kick), 12:06. Red Raiders 35–21. Drive: 5 plays, 69 yards, 1:31.
- ISU – Shontrelle Johnson 3-yard run (Cole Netten kick), 10:40. Red Raiders 35–28. Drive: 2 plays, 20 yards, 0:16.
- TTU – Sadale Foster 38-yard run (Ryan Bustin kick), 5:30. Red Raiders 42–28. Drive: 6 plays, 80 yards, 1:44.
- ISU – E. J. Bibbs 16-yard pass from Sam Richardson (Cole Netten kick), 1:54. Red Raiders 42–35. Drive: 13 plays, 80 yards, 3:36.

Top passers

- ISU – Sam Richardson – 15/38, 168 yards, TD
- TTU – Davis Webb – 35/56, 415 yards, 3 TD, INT

Top rushers

- ISU – Aaron Wimberly – 19 rushes, 65 yards, TD
- TTU – DeAndre Washington – 13 rushes, 88 yards, TD

Top receivers

- ISU – Quenton Bundrage – 5 receptions, 52 yards
- TTU – Jace Amaro – 9 receptions, 143 yards

The 5–0 Red Raiders returned home for a Big 12 contest against the Iowa State Cyclones, which came into the game with a 1–3 record and an 0–1 record in conference play. Texas Tech freshman quarterback Davis Webb started his first game as a Red Raider, throwing for 415 yards and three touchdowns, with one interception. The game was close through the first three quarters, with Texas Tech opening the game with a touchdown pass from Webb to Jakeem Grant on the Red Raiders' first possession. However, the Cyclones scored on a 95-yard kickoff return to tie the score early in the first quarter. Webb threw a touchdown pass to Eric Ward, and Kenny Williams scored on a 1-yard touchdown run as Texas Tech and Iowa State went into halftime tied 21–21. Webb connected with Bradley Marquez on a 12-yard touchdown pass in the third quarter, which ended with Texas Tech leading 28–21. DeAndre Washington and SaDale Foster had touchdown runs in the fourth quarter as Texas Tech held on for the victory, although the Red Raiders had to recover an ISU onside kick attempt with just under two minutes remaining to secure the victory. In the game, the Red Raiders lost two fumbles and threw one interception, while failing to force any turnovers on defense. Texas Tech ended up with 666 yards of total offense to just 311 for Iowa State, with the turnovers helping Iowa State to keep the game close.

=== At West Virginia ===
No. 16 Texas Tech Red Raiders at West Virginia Mountaineers – Game summary

Quarter	1	2	3	4	Total
No. 16 Red Raiders	10	3	10	14	37
Mountaineers	0	13	14	0	27

at Mountaineer Field at Milan Puskar Stadium, Morgantown, West Virginia

- Date: October 19
- Game time: 11:00 a.m.
- Game weather: Temperature: 51 °F (11 °C) • Weather: Overcast • Wind: Calm
- Game attendance: 54,084
- Referee: Randy Christal
- TV: FS1
- Box score, Recap

Game information

First quarter

- TTU – Jace Amaro 10-yard pass from Davis Webb (Ryan Bustin kick), 11:00. Red Raiders 7–0. Drive: 4 plays, 47 yards, 1:25.
- TTU – Ryan Bustin 21-yard field goal, 6:09. Red Raiders 10–0. Drive: 11 plays, 64 yards, 2:44.

Second quarter

- TTU – Ryan Bustin 36-yard field goal, 12:30. Red Raiders 13–0. Drive: 9 plays, 55 yards, 3:16.
- WVU – Josh Lambert 33-yard field goal, 9:01. Red Raiders 13–3. Drive: 11 plays, 73 yards, 3:21.
- WVU – Dreamius Smith 38-yard run (Josh Lambert kick), 2:04. Red Raiders 13–10. Drive: 9 plays, 99 yards, 3:53.
- WVU – Josh Lambert 30-yard field goal, 0:23. Tied 13–13. Drive: 4 plays, 4 yards, 1:32.

Third quarter

- WVU – Charles Sims 4-yard pass from Clint Trickett (Josh Lambert kick), 9:27. Mountaineers 20–13. Drive: 13 plays, 74 yards, 5:28.
- TTU – Ryan Bustin 26-yard field goal, 7:24. Mountaineers 20–16. Drive: 6 plays, 38 yards, 1:49.
- WVU – Dreamius Smith 12-yard run (Josh Lambert kick), 4:36. Mountaineers 27–16. Drive: 7 plays, 72 yards, 2:40.
- TTU – Kenny Williams 1-yard run (Ryan Bustin kick), 2:26. Mountaineers 27–23. Drive: 8 plays, 80 yards, 2:05.

Fourth quarter

- TTU – Kenny Williams 1-yard run (Ryan Bustin kick), 9:30. Red Raiders 30–27. Drive: 7 plays, 84 yards, 2:08.
- TTU – Jace Amaro 10-yard pass from Davis Webb (Ryan Bustin kick), 1:01. Red Raiders 37–27. Drive: 10 plays, 69 yards, 3:29.

Top passers

- TTU – Davis Webb – 36/50, 462 yards, 2 TD
- WVU – Clint Trickett – 27/43, 254 yards, TD

Top rushers

- TTU – Kenny Williams – 16 rushes, 58 yards, 2 TD
- WVU – Dreamius Smith – 16 rushes, 89 yards, 2 TD

Top receivers

- TTU – Jace Amaro – 9 receptions, 136 yards, 2 TD
- WVU – Daikiel Shorts – 9 receptions, 78 yards

Undefeated and ranked No. 16 by the Associated Press, the Red Raiders traveled to Morgantown to face 3–3 West Virginia. The matchup was a reunion of sorts, as West Virginia head coach Dana Holgorsen was an assistant at Texas Tech from 2000 to 2007, during the quarterback tenure of Kliff Kingsbury (1999–2002). The Red Raiders got out to a quick 13–0 lead, with a pair of field goals by Ryan Bustin and a 10-yard touchdown pass from Davis Webb to Jace Amaro. The Mountaineers then went on a 27–3 scoring run, taking a 27–16 lead in the third quarter. Texas Tech faced a crucial third down play in the third quarter at the West Virginia 43-yard line, and Webb connected with Jace Amaro for a 32-yard gain to put Texas Tech deep in Mountaineer territory. Kenny Williams completed the drive with a touchdown run to pull Texas Tech to within 27–23. Texas Tech took the lead in the fourth quarter on another touchdown run by Kenny Williams, and the Red Raiders extended their lead to 37–27 on a touchdown pass from Webb to Amaro on their final possession to put the game away. Webb ended up breaking Texas Tech's freshman passing record for a single game with 462 yards, hitting 36 of 50 passes for two touchdowns and no interceptions. Texas Tech's defense totally shut down the Mountaineer offense in the fourth quarter, forcing the Mountaineers to punt on four straight possessions in the second half. After starting the season 7–0, this would be the last game the Red Raiders would win in the 2013 regular season. After their win, this would be the highest rank for Texas Tech in the 2013 season at No. 10 in both the AP and BCS overall standings and #9 in the USA Today coaches poll.

=== At Oklahoma ===
No. 10 Texas Tech Red Raiders at No. 17 Oklahoma Sooners – Game summary

Quarter	1	2	3	4	Total
No. 10 Red Raiders	7	0	17	6	30
No. 17 Sooners	0	14	14	10	38

at Gaylord Family Oklahoma Memorial Stadium, Norman, Oklahoma

- Date: October 26
- Game time: 2:30 p.m.
- Game weather: Temperature: 59 °F (15 °C) • Weather: Cloudy • Wind: S 5 MPH
- Game attendance: 84,734
- Referee: Mike Defee
- TV announcers (Fox): Gus Johnson (play-by-play), Charles Davis (analyst) and Kristina Pink (sideline)
- Box score, Recap

Game information

First quarter

- TTU – Eric Ward 3-yard pass from Kenny Williams (Ryan Bustin kick), 3:38. Red Raiders 7–0. Drive: 9 plays, 51 yards, 2:06.

Second quarter

- OKLA – Jalen Saunders 15-yard pass from Blake Bell (Michael Hunnicutt kick), 5:55. Tied 7–7. Drive: 16 plays, 97 yards, 7:36.
- OKLA – Jalen Saunders 76-yard pass from Blake Bell (Michael Hunnicutt kick), 3:55. Sooners 14–7. Drive: 1 play, 76 yards, 0:11.

Third quarter

- OKLA – Damien Williams 3-yard run (Michael Hunnicutt kick), 9:37. Sooners 21–7. Drive: 11 plays, 86 yards, 5:23.
- TTU – Eric Ward 23-yard pass from Davis Webb (Ryan Bustin kick), 8:37. Sooners 21–14. Drive: 4 plays, 75 yards, 1:00.
- TTU – Ryan Bustin 34-yard field goal, 3:59. Sooners 21–17. Drive: 6 plays, 26 yards, 3:06.
- TTU – Jakeem Grant 17-yard pass from Davis Webb (Ryan Bustin kick), 3:08. Red Raiders 24–21. Drive: 3 plays, 46 yards, 0:51.
- OKLA – Lacolton Bester 35-yard run (Michael Hunnicutt kick), 0:33. Sooners 28–24. Drive: 5 plays, 75 yards, 2:35.

Fourth quarter

- OKLA – Damien Williams 3-yard run (Michael Hunnicutt kick), 11:04. Sooners 35–24. Drive: 7 plays, 58 yards, 2:35.
- TTU – Kenny Williams 1-yard run (pass failed), 7:13. Sooners 35–30. Drive: 11 plays, 76 yards, 3:51.
- OKLA – Michael Hunnicutt 37-yard field goal, 1:17. Sooners 38–30. Drive: 12 plays, 53 yards, 5:56.

Top passers

- TTU – Davis Webb – 33/53, 385 yards, 2 TD, 2 INT
- OKLA – Blake Bell – 14/22, 249 yards, 2 TD

Top rushers

- TTU – DeAndre Washington – 10 rushes, 56 yards
- OKLA – Damien Williams – 19 rushes, 97 yards, 2 TD

Top receivers

- TTU – Jace Amaro – 8 receptions, 119 yards
- OKLA – Jalen Saunders – 6 receptions, 153 yards, 2 TD

This was the first ranked team Texas Tech played since facing the TCU Horned Frogs in week 3. The Red Raiders jumped out in front 7–0 on a trick play pass from Kenny Williams to Eric Ward, but Tech was denied another scoring chance in the first quarter on a controversial offensive pass interference call against Jakeem Grant. Tech fell behind 21–7, but stormed back to lead 24–21 late in through the third quarter. Davis Webb threw third-quarter touchdown passes to Eric Ward and Jakeem Grant as Tech took the lead with 3:08 left in the third quarter. However, the Sooners took advantage of three Tech turnovers to pull away for the win. Webb completed 33 of 53 passes for 385 yards, but with two interceptions. With the loss, the Red Raiders' season record fell to 7–1 and they dropped to No. 15 in the BCS rankings.

=== Oklahoma State ===
No. 18 Oklahoma State Cowboys at No. 15 Texas Tech Red Raiders – Game summary

Quarter	1	2	3	4	Total
No. 18 Cowboys	21	7	21	3	52
No. 15 Red Raiders	3	21	7	3	34

at Jones AT&T Stadium, Lubbock, Texas

- Date: November 2
- Game time: 6:00 p.m.
- Game weather: Temperature: 65 °F (18 °C) • Weather: Clear • Wind: SSW 11 MPH
- Game attendance: 61,836
- Referee: Reggie Smith
- TV: Fox
- Box score, Recap

Game information

First quarter

- OKST – Tracy Moore 6-yard pass from Clint Chelf (Ben Grogan kick), 7:17. Cowboys 7–0. Drive: 10 plays, 84 yards, 3:33.
- OKST – Desmond Roland 1-yard run (Ben Grogan kick), 6:04. Cowboys 14–0. Drive: 3 plays, 45 yards, 0:37.
- OKST – Desmond Roland 1-yard run (Ben Grogan kick), 4:09. Cowboys 21–0. Drive: 4 plays, 15 yards, 0:46.
- TTU – Ryan Bustin 32-yard field goal, 1:33. Cowboys 21–3. Drive: 9 plays, 60 yards, 2:36.

Second quarter

- TTU – Eric Ward 38-yard pass from Davis Webb (Ryan Bustin kick), 14:49. Cowboys 21–10. Drive: 2 plays, 51 yards, 0:26.
- OKST – Jeremy Seaton 1-yard pass from Clint Chelf (Ben Grogan kick), 10:22. Cowboys 28–10. Drive: 11 plays, 75 yards, 4:27.
- TTU – Pete Robertson 21-yard interception return (Ryan Bustin kick), 5:17. Cowboys 28–17.
- TTU – Kenny Williams 2-yard run (Ryan Bustin kick), 2:00. Cowboys 28–24. Drive: 5 plays, 63 yards, 2:10.

Third quarter

- OKST – Desmond Roland 3-yard run (Ben Grogan kick), 9:58. Cowboys 35–24. Drive: 4 plays, 11 yards, 1:58.
- OKST – Clint Chelf 67-yard run (Ben Grogan kick), 7:50. Cowboys 42–24. Drive: 3 plays, 68 yards, 0:46.
- TTU – Jace Amaro 1-yard pass from Davis Webb (Ryan Bustin kick), 4:31. Cowboys 42–31. Drive: 6 plays, 55 yards, 2:02.
- OKST – Clint Chelf 8-yard run (Ben Grogan kick), 1:44. Cowboys 49–31. Drive: 9 plays, 75 yards, 2:47.

Fourth quarter

- TTU – Ryan Bustin 26-yard field goal, 13:33. Cowboys 49–34. Drive: 9 plays, 60 yards, 3:11.
- OKST – Ben Grogan 41-yard field goal, 10:43. Cowboys 52–34. Drive: 7 plays, 32 yards, 2:50.

Top passers

- OKST – Clint Chelf – 18/34, 211 yards, 2 TD, 2 INT
- TTU – Davis Webb – 45/71, 425 yards, 2 TD, 2 INT

Top rushers

- OKST – Desmond Roland – 31 rushes, 96 yards, 3 TD
- TTU – DeAndre Washington – 10 rushes, 69 yards

Top receivers

- OKST – Jhajuan Seales – 3 receptions, 78 yards
- TTU – Jace Amaro – 15 receptions, 174 yards, TD

The Red Raiders were looking to bounce back after their first loss of the 2013 season in the previous week to OU. The Red Raiders hosted the OSU Cowboys and experienced a dismal first quarter, with OSU leading 21–3. The Red Raiders came back in the 2nd quarter to make the game close at halftime. Pete Robertson returned an interception 21 yards for a touchdown, and Eric Ward pulled in a 38-yard touchdown pass. The Raiders scored on a 2-yard touchdown run by Kenny Williams to trail 28–24 going into halftime. The Red Raiders experienced a dismal second half offensively and defensively, scoring only on a short touchdown pass from Davis Webb to Jace Amaro and on a Ryan Bustin field goal. With their second consecutive loss, the Red Raiders dropped to No. 25 in the AP polls.

=== Kansas State ===
Kansas State Wildcats at No. 25 Texas Tech Red Raiders – Game summary

Quarter	1	2	3	4	Total
Wildcats	14	21	0	14	49
No. 25 Red Raiders	10	0	9	7	26

at Jones AT&T Stadium, Lubbock, Texas

- Date: November 9
- Game time: 11:00 a.m.
- Game attendance: 54,609
- Referee: Scott Novak
- TV: ABC
- Box score, Recap

Game information

First quarter

- TTU – Ryan Bustin 23-yard field goal, 11:42. Red Raiders 3–0. Drive: 14 plays, 69 yards, 3:18.
- KSU – John Hubert 63-yard run (Jack Cantele kick), 10:55. Wildcats 7–3. Drive: 2 plays, 65 yards, 0:47.
- TTU – Eric Ward 2-yard pass from Davis Webb (Ryan Bustin kick), 6:49. Red Raiders 10–7. Drive: 15 plays, 75 yards, 4:06.
- KSU – Jake Waters 1-yard run (Jack Cantele kick), 1:26. Wildcats 14–10. Drive: 9 plays, 65 yards, 5:23.

Second quarter

- KSU – Daniel Sams 5-yard run (Jack Cantele kick), 10:22. Wildcats 21–10. Drive: 9 plays, 66 yards, 4:40.
- KSU – Jake Waters 13-yard run (Jack Cantele kick), 5:14. Wildcats 28–10. Drive: 7 plays, 73 yards, 3:41.
- KSU – Tramaine Thompson 20-yard pass from Jake Waters (Jack Cantele kick), 1:10. Wildcats 35–10. Drive: 5 plays, 32 yards, 2:24.

Third quarter

- TTU – Baker Mayfield 4-yard run (kick blocked), 9:34. Wildcats 35–16. Drive: 13 plays, 55 yards, 4:26.
- TTU – Ryan Bustin 31-yard field goal, 3:01. Wildcats 35–19. Drive: 11 plays, 73 yards, 4:01.

Fourth quarter

- KSU – Daniel Sams 1-yard run (Jack Cantele kick), 14:56. Wildcats 42–19. Drive: 11 plays, 73 yards, 4:01.
- KSU – Ty Zimmerman 43-yard interception return (Jack Cantele kick), 14:07. Wildcats 49–19.
- TTU – SaDale Foster 5-yard run (Ryan Bustin kick), 7:08. Wildcats 49–26. Drive: 8 plays, 57 yards, 2:45.

Top passers

- KSU – Jake Waters – 6/9, 65 yards, TD
- TTU – Baker Mayfield – 34/44, 276 yard, 2 INT

Top rushers

- KSU – John Hubert – 23 rushes, 157 yards, TD
- TTU – Kenny Williams – 15 rushes, 66 yards

Top receivers

- KSU – Tyler Lockett – 4 receptions, 44 yards
- TTU – Eric Ward – 11 receptions, 107 yards, TD

After losing to unranked Kansas State, Texas Tech fell out of the BCS rankings and dropped to 7–3.

=== vs. Baylor ===
Texas Tech Red Raiders vs. No. 4 Baylor Bears – Game summary

Quarter	1	2	3	4	Total
Red Raiders	20	7	7	0	34
No. 4 Bears	21	14	21	7	63

at AT&T Stadium, Arlington, Texas

- Date: November 16
- Game time: 6:00 p.m.
- Game weather: None (retractable roof closed)
- Game attendance: 69,188
- Referee: Alan Eck
- TV: Fox
- Box score, Recap

Game information

First quarter

- TTU – Jace Amaro 6-yard pass from Kenny Williams (Ryan Bustin kick), 11:02. Red Raiders 7–0. Drive: 15 plays, 75 yards, 3:58.
- TTU – Jace Amaro 20-yard pass from Baker Mayfield (Ryan Bustin kick), 6:57. Red Raiders 14–0. Drive: 8 plays, 89 yards, 2:46.
- BAY – Levi Norwood 40-yard pass from Bryce Petty (Aaron Jones kick), 6:05. Red Raiders 14–7. Drive: 3 plays, 57 yards, 0:52.
- TTU – Eric Ward 5-yard pass from Baker Mayfield (kick failed), 3:25. Red Raiders 20–7. Drive: 8 plays, 75 yards, 2:40.
- BAY – Levi Norwood 58-yard punt return (Aaron Jones kick), 1:39. Red Raiders 20–14.
- BAY – Antwan Goodley 31-yard pass from Bryce Petty (Aaron Jones kick), 0:04. Bears 21–20. Drive: 1 play, 31 yards, 0:06.

Second quarter

- BAY – Devin Chafin 3-yard run (Aaron Jones kick), 8:18. Bears 28–20. Drive: 5 plays, 44 yards, 1:01.
- TTU – Jakeem Grant 3-yard pass from Baker Mayfield (Ryan Bustin kick), 4:28. Bears 28–27. Drive: 4 plays, 23 yards, 1:41.
- BAY – Levi Norwood 58-yard pass from Bryce Petty (Aaron Jones kick), 3:12. Bears 35–27. Drive: 5 plays, 68 yards, 1:16.

Third quarter

- BAY – Bryce Petty 6-yard run (Aaron Jones kick), 12:33. Bears 42–27. Drive: 8 plays, 71 yards, 2:27.
- BAY – Devin Chafin 47-yard run (Aaron Jones kick), 8:35. Bears 49–27. Drive: 5 plays, 75 yards, 1:16.
- TTU – Reginald Davis 19-yard pass from Baker Mayfield (Ryan Bustin kick), 2:45. Bears 49–34. Drive: 5 plays, 63 yards, 2:45.
- BAY – Bryce Petty 1-yard run (Aaron Jones kick), 0:19. Bears 56–34. Drive: 9 plays, 72 yards, 2:26.

Fourth quarter

- BAY – Shock Linwood 10-yard run (Aaron Jones kick), 7:30. Bears 63–34. Drive: 8 plays, 75 yards, 3:38.

Top passers

- TTU – Baker Mayfield – 28/51, 314 yards, 4 TD, INT
- BAY – Bryce Petty – 17/31, 335 yards, 3 TD

Top rushers

- TTU – Kenny Williams – 8 rushes, 48 yards
- BAY – Shock Linwood – 29 rushes, 187 yards, TD

Top receivers

- TTU – Eric Ward – 7 receptions, 82 yards, TD
- BAY – Levi Norwood – 7 receptions, 156 yards, 2 TD

The Baylor Bears and the Texas Tech Red Raiders met at the mutual site of AT&T Stadium in Arlington, TX, home of the Dallas Cowboys.

=== Texas ===
Texas Tech Red Raiders at Texas Longhorns – Game summary

Quarter	1	2	3	4	Total
Red Raiders	7	3	0	6	16
Longhorns	10	10	7	14	41

at Darrell K Royal–Texas Memorial Stadium, Austin, Texas

- Date: November 28
- Game time: 6:30 p.m. CST
- Game weather: Temperature: 54 °F (12 °C) • Weather: mostly clear • Wind: calm
- Game attendance: 100,668
- Referee: Greg Burks
- TV announcers (FS1): Gus Johnson (play-by-play), Charles Davis (analyst) and Kristina Pink (sideline)
- Box score, Recap

Game information

First quarter

- TTU – Ryan Erxleben 51-yard run (Ryan Bustin kick), 9:44. Red Raiders 7–0. Drive: 7 plays, 72 yards, 3:00.
- TEX – Anthony Fera 37-yard field goal, 6:00. Red Raiders 7–3. Drive: 10 plays, 49 yards, 3:44.
- TEX – Mike Davis 47-yard pass from Case McCoy (Anthony Fera kick), 0:11. Longhorns 10–7. Drive: 3 plays, 77 yards, 0:51.

Second quarter

- TEX – Anthony Fera 49-yard field goal, 8:18. Longhorns 13–7. Drive: 7 plays, 27 yards, 2:10.
- TEX – Joe Bergeron 12-yard run (Athony Fera kick), 3:07. Longhorns 20–7. Drive: 7 plays, 80 yards, 2:59.
- TTU – Ryan Bustin 32-yard field goal, 0:00. Longhorns 20–10. Drive: 11 plays, 32 yards, 3:07.

Third quarter

- TEX – Case McCoy 1-yard run (Anthony Fera kick), 10:04. Longhorns 27–10. Drive: 8 plays, 51 yards, 3:28.

Fourth quarter

- TEX – Mike Davis 7-yard pass from Case McCoy (Anthony Fera kick), 14:56. Longhorns 34–10. Drive: 10 plays, 71 yards, 3:55.
- TTU – Jace Amaro 11-yard pass from Michael Brewer (kick failed), 11:04. Longhorns 34–16. Drive: 7 plays, 78 yards, 1:59.
- TEX – Tyrone Swoopes 1-yard run (Anthony Fera kick), 4:22. Longhorns 41–16. Drive: 4 plays, 4 yards, 1:49.

Top passers

- TTU – Baker Mayfield – 24/44, 237 yards, INT
- TEX – Case McCoy – 10/19, 139 yards, 2 TD

Top rushers

- TTU – Ryan Erxleben – 1 rush, 51 yards, TD
- TEX – Malcom Brown – 27 rushes, 128 yards

Top receivers

- TTU – Eric Ward – 8 receptions, 88 yards
- TEX – Mike Davis – 4 receptions, 112 yards, 2 TD

With the loss, the Red Raiders fell to 7–5, losing 5 in a row.

=== vs. Arizona State (Holiday Bowl) ===
No. 16 Arizona State Sun Devils vs. Texas Tech Red Raiders (2013 Holiday Bowl)

Quarter	1	2	3	4	Total
No. 16 Sun Devils	6	7	7	3	23
Red Raiders	13	14	10	0	37

at Qualcomm Stadium, San Diego, California

- Date: December 30
- Game time: 9:15 p.m. CST/7:15 p.m. PST
- Game weather: Temperature: 55 °F (13 °C) • Weather: sunny • Wind: E 10 MPH
- Game attendance: 52,930
- Referee: Matt Austin
- TV announcers (ESPN): Joe Tessitore (play-by-play), Matt Millen (analyst) and Maria Taylor (sideline)
- Box score, Recap

Game information

First quarter

- TTU – Rodney Hall 1-yard pass from Davis Webb (kick failed), 9:41. Red Raiders 6–0. Drive: 14 plays, 77 yards, 5:19.
- TTU – Jakeem Grant 18-yard pass from Davis Webb (Ryan Bustin kick), 6:27. Red Raiders 13–0. Drive: 6 plays, 68 yards, 1:42.
- ASU – Zane Gonzalez 44-yard field goal, 4:26. 'Red Raiders 13–3. Drive: 4 plays, 52 yards, 2:01.
- ASU – Zane Gonzalez 31-yard field goal, 2:22. Red Raiders 13–6. Drive: 4 plays, 13 yards, 2:04.

Second quarter

- TTU – Bradley Marquez 23-yard pass from Davis Webb (Ryan Bustin kick), 14:30. Red Raiders 20–6. Drive: 7 plays, 82 yards, 2:52.
- TTU – Jakeem Grant 21-yard pass from Davis Webb (Ryan Bustin kick), 10:08. Red Raiders 27–6. Drive: 7 plays, 81 yards, 2:41.
- ASU – D. J. Foster 20-yard run (Zane Gonzalez kick), 7:52. Red Raiders 27–13. Drive: 2 plays, 27 yards, 0:22.

Third quarter

- ASU – Taylor Kelly 44-yard run (Zane Gonzalez kick), 13:13. Red Raiders 27–20. Drive: 6 plays, 78 yards, 1:47.
- TTU – Reginald Davis III 90-yard kick return (Ryan Bustin kick), 13:02. Red Raiders 34–20.
- TTU – Ryan Bustin 23-yard field goal, 5:28. Red Raiders 37–20. Drive: 14 plays, 63 yards, 5:27.

Fourth quarter

- ASU – Zane Gonzalez 33-yard field goal, 13:39. Red Raiders 37–23. Drive: 14 plays, 69 yards, 4:24.

Top passers

- ASU – Taylor Kelly – 16/29, 125 yards, INT
- TTU – Davis Webb – 28/41, 403 yards, 4 TD

Top rushers

- ASU – Taylor Kelly – 25 rushes, 135 yards, TD
- TTU – DeAndre Washington – 14 rushes, 51 yards

Top receivers

- ASU – Kevin Ozier – 2 receptions, 31 yards
- TTU – Jace Amaro – 8 receptions, 112 yards

After losing their last five games of the regular season, the Red Raiders were expected to lose to the Sun Devils. ESPN broadcasts during 2013 bowl games included a prediction that Texas Tech would lose by 22 points, based on computer models. Las Vegas odds makers also favored an Arizona State victory by a line of up to 14 points. In an unexpected turn, Texas Tech got the upset and won their first game since October 19 against West Virginia. Davis Webb threw for 403 yards and tied the Holiday Bowl record with four touchdown passes.

The Red Raiders opened the scoring on a 1-yard touchdown pass from Webb to Rodney Hall on their first possession, capping a 77-yard drive. It was Hall's first catch of the year from his fullback position. Webb also threw two first-half touchdown passes to Jakeem Grant and a touchdown pass to Bradley Marquez as the Red Raiders opened a 27–13 halftime lead. The Sun Devils scored on their opening possession of the second half to pull within one touchdown at 27–20, but the Red Raiders struck back immediately when freshman Reginald Davis ran back the ensuing kickoff 90 yards for a touchdown. Ryan Bustin's 23-yard field goal late in the third quarter extended Texas Tech's lead to 37–20. Arizona State added a field goal in the fourth quarter to make it 37–23, but Texas Tech cornerback Justis Nelson intercepted a Sun Devil pass late in the quarter to end Arizona State's final scoring threat.

The Red Raiders finished their 2013 season with an 8–5 record.

== Rankings ==
Ranking movements Legend: ██ Increase in ranking ██ Decrease in ranking — = Not ranked RV = Received votes
	Week																
Poll	Pre	1	2	3	4	5	6	7	8	9	10	11	12	13	14	15	Final
AP	—	—	—	25	24	20	20	16	10	15	25	—	—	—	—	—	RV
Coaches	—	RV	RV	RV	25	22	21	15	9	15	23	RV	—	—	—	—	RV
Harris	Not released							15	9	14	23	RV	RV	—	—	—	Not released
BCS	Not released								10	15	25	—	—	—	—	—	Not released

== Depth chart ==
Defense

FS
Tre' Porter
Keenon Ward
⋅

BANDIT	ILB	ILB	SLB
Pete Robinson	Will Smith	Sam Eguavoen	⋅
Andre Ross	Zach Winbush	Micah Awe	⋅
⋅	⋅	⋅	⋅

SS
JJ Gaines
Dorian Crawford
⋅

CB
Bruce Jones
Derrick Mays
⋅

DE	NT	DE
Kerry Hyder	Dennell Wesley	Branden Jackson
Demetrius Alston	Jackson Richards	Dartwan Bush
Donte Phillips	Anthony Smith	Kindred Evans

CB
Olaoluwa Falemi
Jeremy Reynolds
⋅

Offense

WR
Eric Ward
Derreck Edwards
DJ Polite-Bray

WR
Jakeem Grant
Sadale Foster/ Carlos Thompson
Davin Lauderdale

LT	LG	C	RG	RT
Le'Raven Clark	Alfredo Morales	Jared Kaster	Beau Carpenter	Rashad Fortenberry
Trey Keenan	Tony Morales	Baylen Brown	James Polk	Matt Wilson
Cody Hayes	Josh Outlaw	⋅	⋅	⋅

WR
Jace Amaro
Dylan Cantrell
Gary Moore/ Jordan Davis

WR
Bradley Marquez
Reginald Davis
Dominique Wheeler

QB
Davis Webb
Baker Mayfield
Michael Brewer

RB
Kenny Williams
DeAndré Washington
Sadale Foster
