= Notre Dame High School (Riverside, California) =

Location
- 7085 Brockton Avenue; Riverside, California 92506; United States
- Coordinates: 33°56′42″N 117°23′48″W

Information
- Type: Catholic, Coeducational
- Motto: Cor Unum Et Anima Una (One Heart, One Spirit)
- Religious affiliation: Roman Catholic
- Patron saints: Mary, Mother of Jesus
- Established: 1956
- School district: Diocese of San Bernardino
- President: Chris Barrows
- Principal: Manuel Cardoza
- Grades: 9-12
- Average class size: 20
- Colors: Green and Gold
- Mascot: Titan
- Team name: Notre Dame Titans
- Rival: Aquinas High School
- Accreditation: Western Association of Schools and Colleges
- Newspaper: The Standard
- Feeder schools: St. Catherine of Alexandria, St. Francis de Sales, Our Lady of Perpetual Help, St. Thomas, St. Edward, St. James, Sacred Heart, St. George, St. Hyacinth Academy
- Website: notredameriverside.org

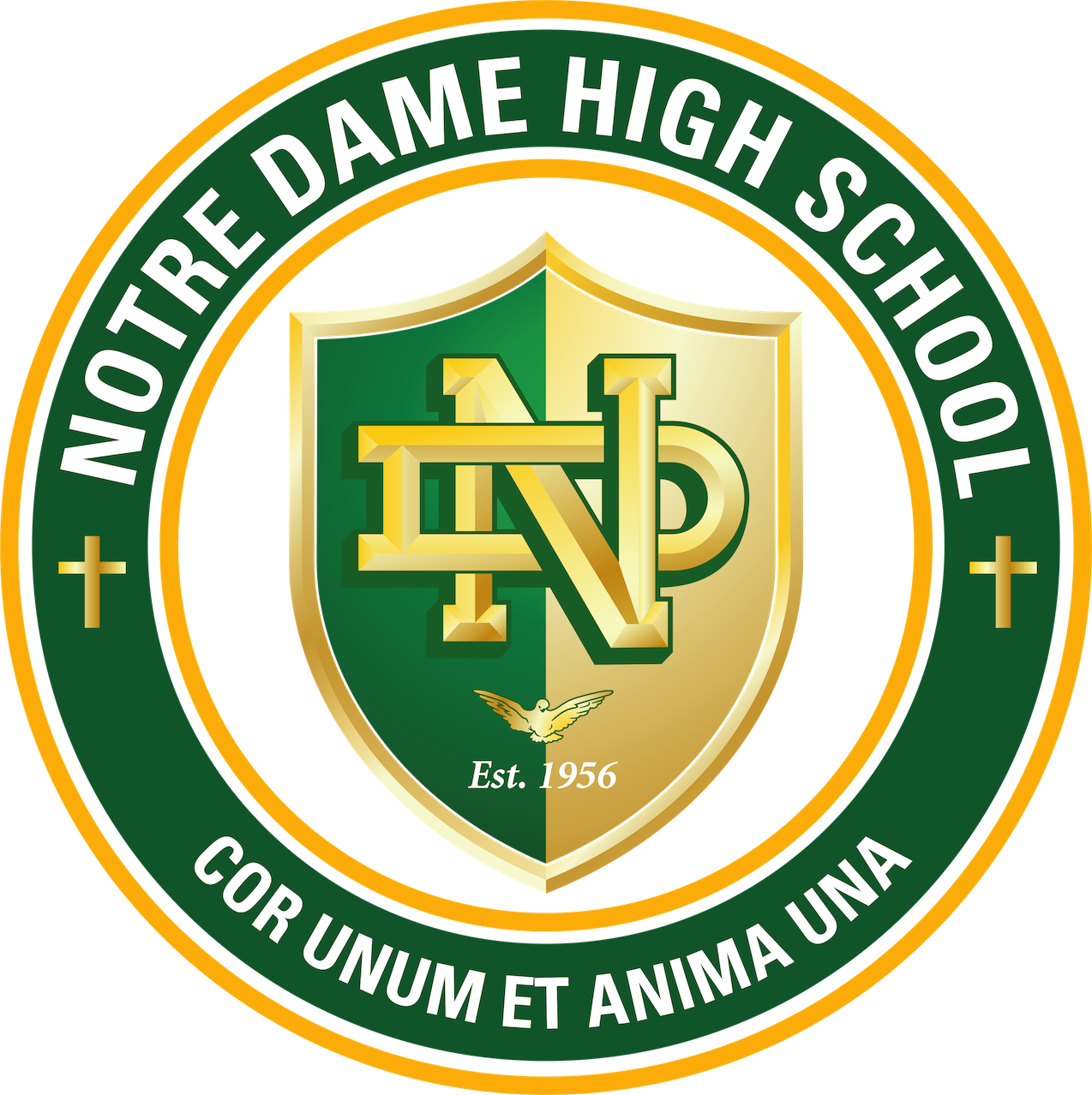

Notre Dame High School is a private, Roman Catholic high school in Riverside, California. It is located across the street from Saint Catherine of Alexandria Catholic Church at the corner of Brockton Avenue and Arlington Avenue. It is part of the Roman Catholic Diocese of San Bernardino.

== Background ==
Notre Dame is a secondary school founded in 1956 by the Most Reverend Charles F. Buddy, Bishop of the Diocese of San Diego, as a Diocesan secondary school for boys. The first principal was Reverend J.V. Sullivan, a Diocesan priest. In 1957, the administration of the school was taken over by the Holy Ghost Fathers, who staffed Notre Dame until 1970, at which time plans were drawn up to merge Notre Dame with St. Francis de Sales Girls High School. Notre Dame became a co-ed school at the start of the school year, in September 1972, under the direction of the Most Reverend Leo T. Maher, Bishop of the Diocese of San Diego.

In 1978, the Diocese of San Diego was divided and the new Diocese of San Bernardino was created with the Most Reverend Philip F. Straling as its first bishop.

== Notable alumni ==
- Kenjon Barner, running back for the Los Angeles Chargers, Philadelphia Eagles
- Will Smith, linebacker for the Dallas Cowboys
- Marvin Cobb, safety for the Cincinnati Bengals 1975-1979
- Michael Huerta, administrator of the Federal Aviation Agency since January 2013 for a 5-year term
- Patricia Lock Dawson, Mayor of Riverside, California
