= Jace Amaro =

American football player (born 1992)

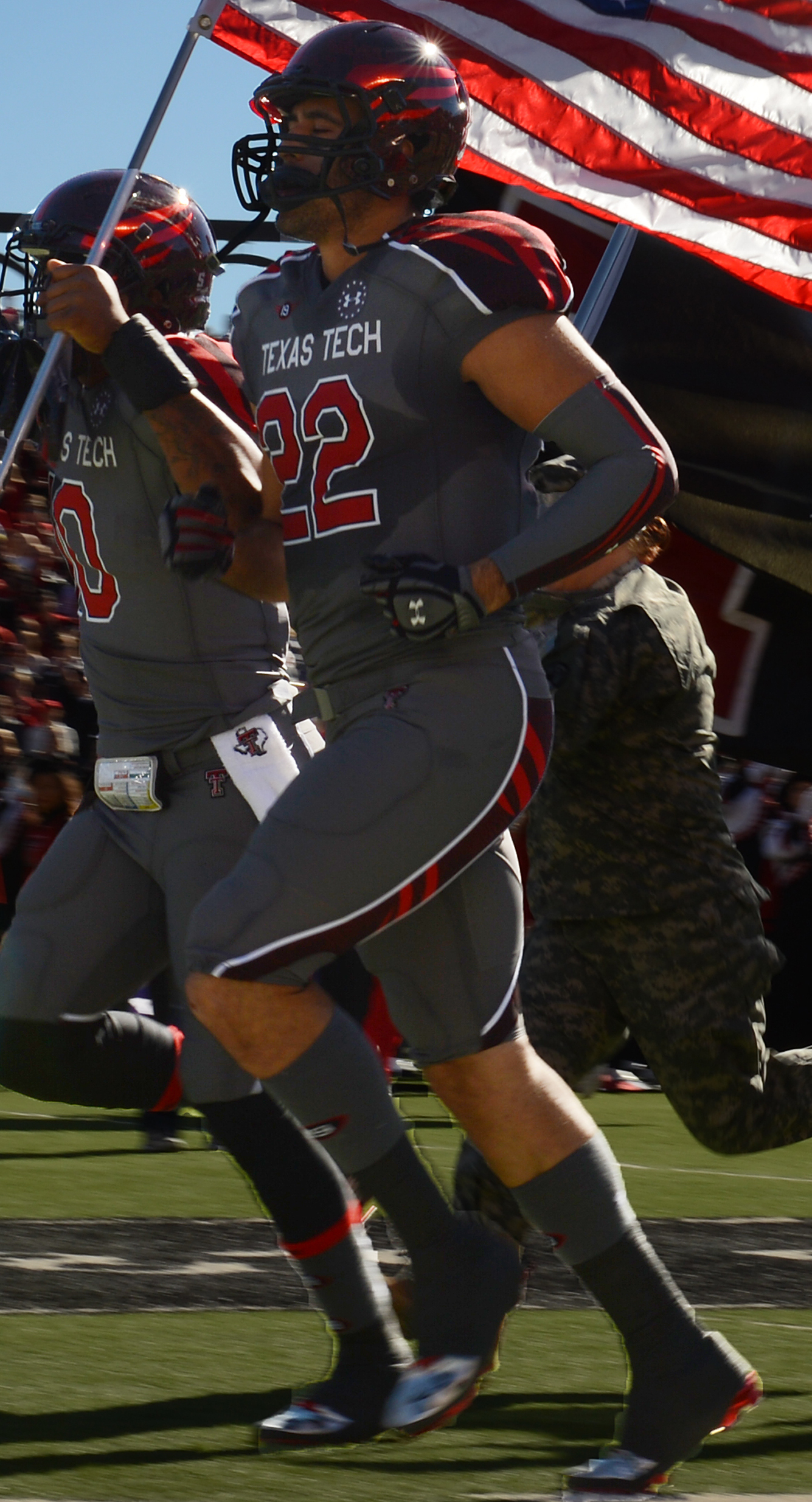
- Amaro with the Texas Tech Red Raiders in 2013

No. 88
- Position: Tight end

Personal information
- Born: June 26, 1992 (age 34); Plano, Texas, U.S.
- Listed height: 6 ft 5 in (1.96 m)
- Listed weight: 265 lb (120 kg)

Career information
- High school: Douglas MacArthur (San Antonio, Texas)
- College: Texas Tech
- NFL draft: 2014: 2nd round, 49th overall pick

Career history
- New York Jets (2014–2015); Tennessee Titans (2016); Kansas City Chiefs (2018)*
- * Offseason or practice squad member only

Awards and highlights
- PFWA All-Rookie Team (2014); Ozzie Newsome Award (2013); Unanimous All-American (2013); First-team All-Big 12 (2013); Second-team All-Big 12 (2012)

Career NFL statistics
- Receptions: 41
- Receiving yards: 404
- Receiving touchdowns: 2
- Stats at Pro Football Reference

Jace Jordan Amaro (born June 26, 1992) is an American former professional football player who was a tight end in the National Football League (NFL). He played college football for the Texas Tech Red Raiders, earning unanimous All-American honors in 2013. He was selected by the New York Jets in the second round of the 2014 NFL draft.

Amaro spent most of his rookie season with the Jets in 2014 as a backup before missing the entire 2015 season to injury, leading to his release prior to the 2016 season. He was then acquired by the Tennessee Titans, but only played in three games in 2016 before being released prior to the 2017 regular season. After an offseason stint with the Kansas City Chiefs in 2018, Amaro spent a year away from football before being drafted by the Seattle Dragons of the XFL in 2020, but never signed with the team.

== Early life ==
Born in New Fairfield, Connecticut, Amaro attended MacArthur High School in San Antonio, Texas, where he was a three-sport star in football, basketball and track. He played as a tight end for the MacArthur Brahmas football team, and was an honorable mention All-State selection, first-team All-Area and first-team District 26-5A. He suffered an Anterior cruciate ligament injury during his junior year. As a senior, he made 56 receptions for 887 yards with 11 touchdowns. He helped lead the basketball team to state quarterfinals appearance.

Also a standout track & field athlete, Amaro broke a 23-year-old District 26-5A shot put record with a throw of 18.88 meters (61 ft, 10 in). He also won the 2010 regional track meet and earned a silver medal with a second-place finish at the state meet. He got a top-throw of 50.75 meters (166 ft, 4 in) in the discus throw at the 2010 District 26-5A, where he took second.

Regarded as a four-star recruit by both Rivals.com and Scout.com, Amaro was ranked as the No. 3 tight end in his class and No. 52 in Rivals Top 100. He was named USA Today and PrepStar First-team All-America, and was ranked in the top five for tight ends in the Dave Campbell's Top 300.

== College career ==
Amaro attended Texas Tech University from 2011 to 2013. During his college career, he earned unanimous All-American honors and set the record for Division I (NCAA) single season receiving yards by a tight end in 2013.

=== Freshman ===
In his freshman year, Amaro had 7 catches for 57 yards and 2 touchdowns.

=== Sophomore ===
In his sophomore year, Amaro started off his first game against Northwestern State with 4 catches for 49 yards. The next week at Texas State, he was able to pull in 3 balls for 55 yards and a touchdown. Against New Mexico, he had 4 catches for 57 yards and two more scores. Against Iowa State, he had four catches for 48 yards and zero scores. Against Oklahoma, he had 3 catches for 29 yards. His best game of the season occurred when Texas Tech upset the then #3 West Virginia; he pulled in 5 catches for 156 yards and 1 touchdown.

During the West Virginia game, Amaro received an injury that sidelined him for the rest of the season after receiving a hard hit to his midsection jumping for a ball. He briefly returned to the game and made 2 receptions after halftime before being unable to continue. The injury was later revealed to be a Grade III (I-V) spleen laceration and a fractured rib. The injury caused internal bleeding, requiring hospitalization and 6.5 units of blood. Amaro was bedridden for three weeks.

Despite only playing 6 regular season games, Amaro was named a 1st Team All-Big 12 Conference player by ESPN. He finished his sophomore season with 25 catches for 409 yards and four touchdowns.

Amaro sufficiently recovered from his injury to appear in the 2012 Meineke Car Care Bowl of Texas against Minnesota, in which he was ejected for punching a defender. Due to his earlier injury, Amaro had been unable to practice until the week of the game.

=== Junior ===
Snubbed by the John Mackey Award in its pre and midseason watchlists, Amaro started the 2013 season strong, leading the country at his position in receptions and reception yards through 7 games as well as leading the country in reception yardage on third down. His performance garnered a midseason 1st team All-American listing from CBS Sports, Sports Illustrated, Athlon Sports, USA Today, and FOX Sports. Following a 136 receiving-yard and 2-touchdown performance over West Virginia, Amaro earned Big 12 Conference Offensive Player of the Week honors. Amaro accompanies former Texas Tech All-American wide receiver Michael Crabtree as the only Red Raiders to ever record eight or more receptions in six consecutive games.

Amaro broke the 1,000 receiving yards mark following a loss to Oklahoma State on November 2, 2013. Amaro exceeded his career receptions and reception yard highs with 15 and 174 respectively, and was two receptions shy of tying the NCAA single-game record for receptions by a tight end. In the following games against Kansas State and Baylor, Amaro received significant injuries. A hit during the Kansas State game forced him to be carted off the field, before later returning briefly. In the subsequent game against Baylor, Amaro received a high hit to the shoulder from safety Ahmad Dixon. The hit required Amaro to again return to the locker room with an injury.

Amaro completed the regular season 90 yards and 14 receptions short of setting NCAA FBS records for single season tight end receiving yards and receptions, with an opportunity to set the records in an appearance in the 2013 Holiday Bowl. Amaro broke the single season tight end receiving record during the game, and finished his Holiday Bowl performance with 8 receptions and 112 yards. With the completion of the season, Amaro's 104 receiving yards per game also set an NCAA single season record for the tight end position.

Amaro was named a semi-finalist for the John Mackey and Fred Biletnikoff Awards in November, becoming the first player to be listed for both awards since Missouri's Chase Coffman in 2008. Amaro was also named a finalist for the Earl Campbell Tyler Rose Award, given to the best offensive player with Texas ties. On November 25, 2013, it was announced that Amaro was not named a finalist for the Mackey Award, given to the best tight end in college football, leading several media personalities including CBS Sports writer Dennis Dodd to criticize the Award's validity. At the point at which the finalist list was announced, Amaro had only 16 fewer receptions than the three finalists combined.

The Associated Press (AP) and Big 12 Coaches named Amaro a unanimous 2013 All-Big 12 first-team selection on December 9, 2013. He was additionally named a 1st Team All-American at the tight end position by Bleacher Report, USA Today, CBS Sports, Sporting News, Athlon Sports, SB Nation, the AP, Sports Illustrated and the Walter Camp Foundation. Amaro became a Unanimous All-American with his 1st team selection by the American Football Coaches Association and the Football Writers Association of America on December 18, 2013, the first Red Raider to earn the honor since Michael Crabtree in 2008. Only 5 Red Raiders overall have earned unanimous All-American honors: Mark Bounds in 1991, Zach Thomas in 1995, Byron Hanspard in 1996, and Michael Crabtree in 2007-08.

Amaro announced his intention to declare for the draft following the Red Raiders upset victory over Arizona State in the Holiday Bowl.

== Professional career ==
=== Pre-draft ===
Pre-draft measurables
Height	Weight	Arm length	Hand span	40-yard dash	10-yard split	20-yard split	20-yard shuttle	Three-cone drill	Vertical jump	Broad jump	Bench press
6 ft 5 3/8 in (1.97 m)	265 lb (120 kg)	34 in (0.86 m)	9 in (0.23 m)	4.74 s	1.64 s	2.76 s	4.3 s	7.42 s	33 in (0.84 m)	9 ft 10 in (3.00 m)	28 reps
All values from NFL Combine

Amaro lowered his 40 time to a 4.60 at his pro day.

=== New York Jets ===
Amaro was selected 49th overall by the New York Jets in the 2014 NFL draft and was the third tight end selected after Eric Ebron and Austin Seferian-Jenkins. He was signed on May 16, 2014. In his 2014 rookie season, Amaro had 38 receptions for 345 receiving yards and two touchdowns in 14 games. He was named to the PFWA All-Rookie Team.

On September 1, 2015, it was revealed that Amaro had a torn labrum, an injury from landing awkwardly during the first preseason game against the Lions. The injury required surgery, prematurely ending his 2015 season.

The Jets waived Amaro on September 3, 2016 for final roster cuts before the start of the season. He is considered to be another on a long list of disappointing draft picks for the Jets.

=== Tennessee Titans ===
Amaro was claimed off waivers by the Tennessee Titans on September 4, 2016.

He started with the Titans as their third tight end on their depth chart, behind veterans Delanie Walker and Anthony Fasano. On September 25, 2016, Amaro made his debut with the Titans and made three receptions for 59 receiving yards in a 17–10 loss to the Oakland Raiders.

On September 2, 2017, Amaro was waived by the Titans for the final roster cuts.

=== Kansas City Chiefs ===
On January 9, 2018, Amaro signed a reserve/future contract with the Kansas City Chiefs. He was released on September 1, 2018 for the final roster cuts.

=== XFL ===
Amaro was selected by the Seattle Dragons of the XFL in the 4th round of the 2020 XFL draft. He was on their reserve list prior to the season and was never signed.

== NFL career statistics ==
=== Regular season ===
Year	Team	Games		Receiving				
Year	Team	GP	GS	Rec	Yds	Avg	Lng	TD
2014	NYJ	14	4	38	345	9.1	43	2
2015	NYJ	Did not play due to injury						
2016	TEN	3	0	3	59	19.7	26	0
Total		17	4	41	404	9.9	43	2
