= Kenjon Barner =

American football player (born 1989)

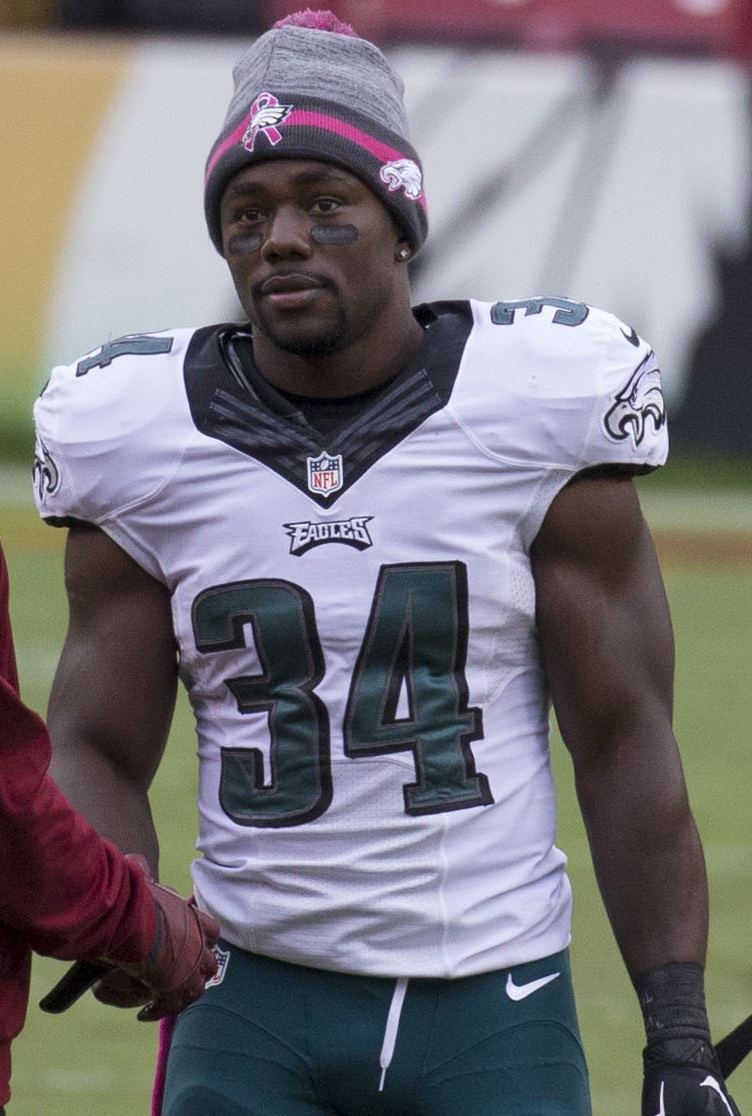
- Barner with the Philadelphia Eagles in 2015

No. 25, 34, 38, 23, 44
- Positions: Running back, return specialist

Personal information
- Born: April 28, 1989 (age 37); Lynwood, California, U.S.
- Listed height: 5 ft 9 in (1.75 m)
- Listed weight: 195 lb (88 kg)

Career information
- High school: Notre Dame (Riverside, California)
- College: Oregon (2009–2012)
- NFL draft: 2013: 6th round, 182nd overall pick

Career history
- Carolina Panthers (2013); Philadelphia Eagles (2014–2016); Los Angeles Chargers (2017)*; Philadelphia Eagles (2017); Carolina Panthers (2018)*; New England Patriots (2018); Carolina Panthers (2018); Atlanta Falcons (2019); Baltimore Ravens (2020)*; Tampa Bay Buccaneers (2020–2022)
- * Offseason or practice squad member only

Awards and highlights
- 3× Super Bowl champion (LII, LIII, LV); Consensus All-American (2012); First-team All-Pac-12 (2012)

Career NFL statistics
- Rushing yards: 416
- Receptions: 28
- Receiving yards: 152
- Return yards: 1,679
- Total touchdowns: 4
- Stats at Pro Football Reference

Kenjon Fa'terrel Barner (born April 28, 1989) is an American former professional football player who was a running back in the National Football League (NFL). He played college football for the Oregon Ducks, earning consensus All-American honors in 2012. Barner was selected by the Carolina Panthers in the sixth round of the 2013 NFL draft. He was also a member of the Los Angeles Chargers, Philadelphia Eagles, New England Patriots, Atlanta Falcons, Baltimore Ravens and Tampa Bay Buccaneers.

== Early life ==
Barner attended Notre Dame High School in Riverside, California, where he played for the Notre Dame Titans high school football team under head coach Patrick Thompson.

Considered a three-star recruit by Rivals.com, Barner was listed as the No. 38 running back in the nation in 2008.

== College career ==
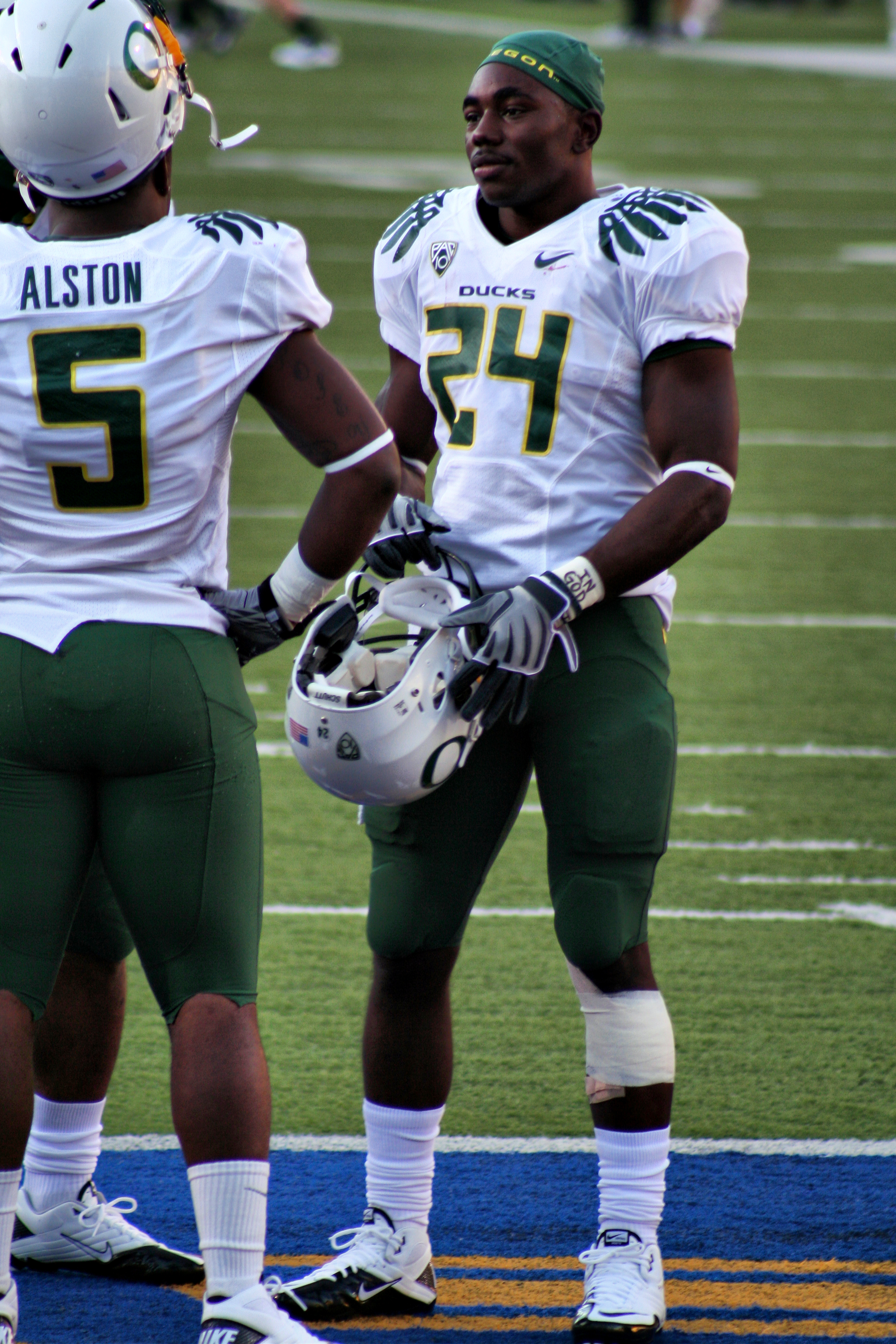
Barner with Oregon in 2010

A native of Southern California, Barner chose to attend the University of Oregon and play for head coach Chip Kelly's Ducks teams. He was ranked by Rivals as the 38th best running back prospect in the country, as well as the 86th overall prospect from the state of California Barner chose Oregon over scholarship offers from Arizona State and UTEP.

Barner is the first Oregon Duck since 1965 who has scored touchdowns rushing, receiving, and from punt and kickoff returns.

In the 2009 season, Barner had 61 carries for 366 yards and three rushing touchdowns to go along with 41 kick returns for 1,020 net yards and a 100-yard kick return touchdown, which came against the UCLA Bruins.

In the 2010 season, Barner's role on the offense expanded. In the season opener against New Mexico, he had 17 carries for 147 rushing yards and four rushing touchdowns to go along with a 60-yard touchdown reception. In the next game, a victory over Tennessee, he had a punt return touchdown. He suffered a career-threatening concussion after a helmet-to-helmet hit against Washington State on October 9. In the annual rivalry game against Oregon State, he had 15 carries for 133 rushing yards and a touchdown. Overall, he had 551 rushing yards, six rushing touchdowns, 121 receiving yards, two receiving touchdowns, 13 kick returns, 236 net kick return yards, 10 punt returns, 132 net punt return yards, and a punt return touchdown in the 2010 season.

In the 2011 season, Barner was the second leading rusher in the Ducks' backfield. On September 24, against Arizona, he had 72 rushing yards, two rushing touchdowns, and two receptions for six yards and a receiving touchdown. On October 15, against Arizona State, he had 31 carries for 171 rushing yards and a touchdown. He followed that up with 115 rushing yards and two rushing touchdowns in a victory over Colorado. On November 19, against Southern California, he had 123 rushing yards and two rushing touchdowns. Overall, in the 2011 season, he had 939 rushing yards, 11 rushing touchdowns, 17 receptions, 184 rushing yards, and three rushing touchdowns.

Barner was considered one of the top running back prospects for the 2012 NFL draft before announcing he would return to Oregon, where he succeeded LaMichael James as the team's main running back. He was named a top contender for the 2012 Heisman Trophy, eventually won by freshman sensation Johnny Manziel.

In the season opener against Arkansas State, Barner had 66 rushing yards and two rushing touchdowns. In the second game, he had 201 rushing yards and three rushing touchdowns in a victory over Fresno State. On September 29, against Washington State, he had 195 rushing yards and three rushing touchdowns to go along with three receptions for 37 yards and a receiving touchdown. On October 18, against Arizona State, he had 143 rushing yards and three rushing touchdowns. On November 3, he set a rushing record for Oregon and for USC Trojans football opponents, with 321 rushing yards; he also scored five touchdowns in the game. In the final game of the regular season, he had 198 rushing yards and two rushing touchdowns in a victory over Oregon State.

The Ducks won the 2013 Fiesta Bowl over Kansas State with Barner having 143 rushing yards and a 24-yard touchdown reception. Following his senior season, Barner was named to the AP All-American second-team and the All-Pac-12 Conference First-team. He finished in ninth place in the 2012 Heisman Trophy voting.

Barner joined the track team following the completion of football's spring drills and competed in two meets at 100 meters and on the 4 × 100 meter relay. He ran the third-leg on Oregon's fourth place 4 × 100 meter relay team at the Pac-10 Championships, where Oregon won its fourth-straight league title with a season-best time of 40.36 seconds. At the 2010 Pac-10 Conference Championships, he ran a career-best time of 10.71 seconds in the 100 meters, finishing 14th in the prelims. He placed 3rd in the 200 meters at the 2011 Oregon Relays, with a time of 22.29 seconds. He also placed 3rd in the 60 meters at the 2011 Washington Husky Invitational, at 7.09 seconds.

== Professional career ==
Pre-draft measurables
Height	Weight	Arm length	Hand span	40-yard dash	10-yard split	20-yard split	20-yard shuttle	Three-cone drill	Vertical jump	Broad jump	Bench press
5 ft 9 1/4 in (1.76 m)	196 lb (89 kg)	29 5/8 in (0.75 m)	9 1/8 in (0.23 m)	4.39 s	1.58 s	2.59 s	4.14 s	6.87 s	35.5 in (0.90 m)	10 ft 2 in (3.10 m)	20 reps
All values from NFL Combine/Oregon's Pro Day

=== Carolina Panthers (first stint) ===
On April 27, 2013, Barner was drafted by the Carolina Panthers in the sixth round (182nd overall) of the 2013 NFL draft. In his rookie year, Barner played a limited role on special teams. He had six carries for seven yards and two catches for seven yards.

=== Philadelphia Eagles (first stint) ===
On August 19, 2014, Barner was traded to the Philadelphia Eagles for a conditional seventh round pick in 2015. The trade reunited Barner with his former head coach at University of Oregon, Chip Kelly. He was released on August 30, 2014. On November 4, 2014, he was signed to the Philadelphia Eagles' practice squad.

During the 2015 preseason, Barner attempted to make the roster behind three former NFL starters, DeMarco Murray, Ryan Mathews and Darren Sproles. Looking to make an impact in the return game, Barner found near immediate success. In the first preseason game against the Indianapolis Colts he returned a punt 92 yards for a touchdown to end the second quarter. In the second preseason game against the Baltimore Ravens, he returned another punt for a 68-yard touchdown. He made the roster and ended up with 124 rushing yards and 22 receiving yards in the 2015 season.

Barner played in 13 games in 2016, rushing 27 times for 129 yards and two touchdowns and recorded five receptions for 42 yards while contributing on special teams as a returner. He was placed on injured reserve on December 20, 2016.

=== Los Angeles Chargers ===
On March 20, 2017, Barner signed a one-year contract with the Los Angeles Chargers. He was released on September 2, 2017.

=== Philadelphia Eagles (second stint) ===
On September 26, 2017, Barner signed a one-year deal with the Eagles after an injury to running back Darren Sproles. In Week 5, Barner averaged 36 yards on three punt returns, including a 76-yarder, in a 34–7 win over the Cardinals, earning him NFC Special Teams Player of the Week. He finished the regular season with 57 rushing yards, one rushing touchdown, 56 receiving yards, 10 kick returns for 194 net yards, and 27 punt returns for 240 net yards. The Eagles finished the season 13–3, clinching the NFC East division. The team reached Super Bowl LII, where they defeated the New England Patriots 41–33, winning their first Super Bowl. In the game, Barner had three kick returns for 73 net yards.

=== Carolina Panthers (second stint) ===
On May 11, 2018, Barner signed with the Panthers. He was released on August 31, 2018, as part of final roster cuts.

=== New England Patriots ===
On September 11, 2018, Barner signed with the New England Patriots. On September 19, 2018, the Patriots released Barner, but re-signed him a week later after Rex Burkhead was placed on injured reserve. He was released again on October 4, 2018, before Barner was re-signed four days later. On November 13, 2018, the Patriots released Barner. On June 13, 2019, the Patriots awarded Barner with a Super Bowl LIII ring.

=== Carolina Panthers (third stint) ===
On November 14, 2018, Barner was claimed off waivers by the Panthers. He was placed on injured reserve on December 28, 2018. He had 19 carries for 71 yards on the 2018 season.

=== Atlanta Falcons ===
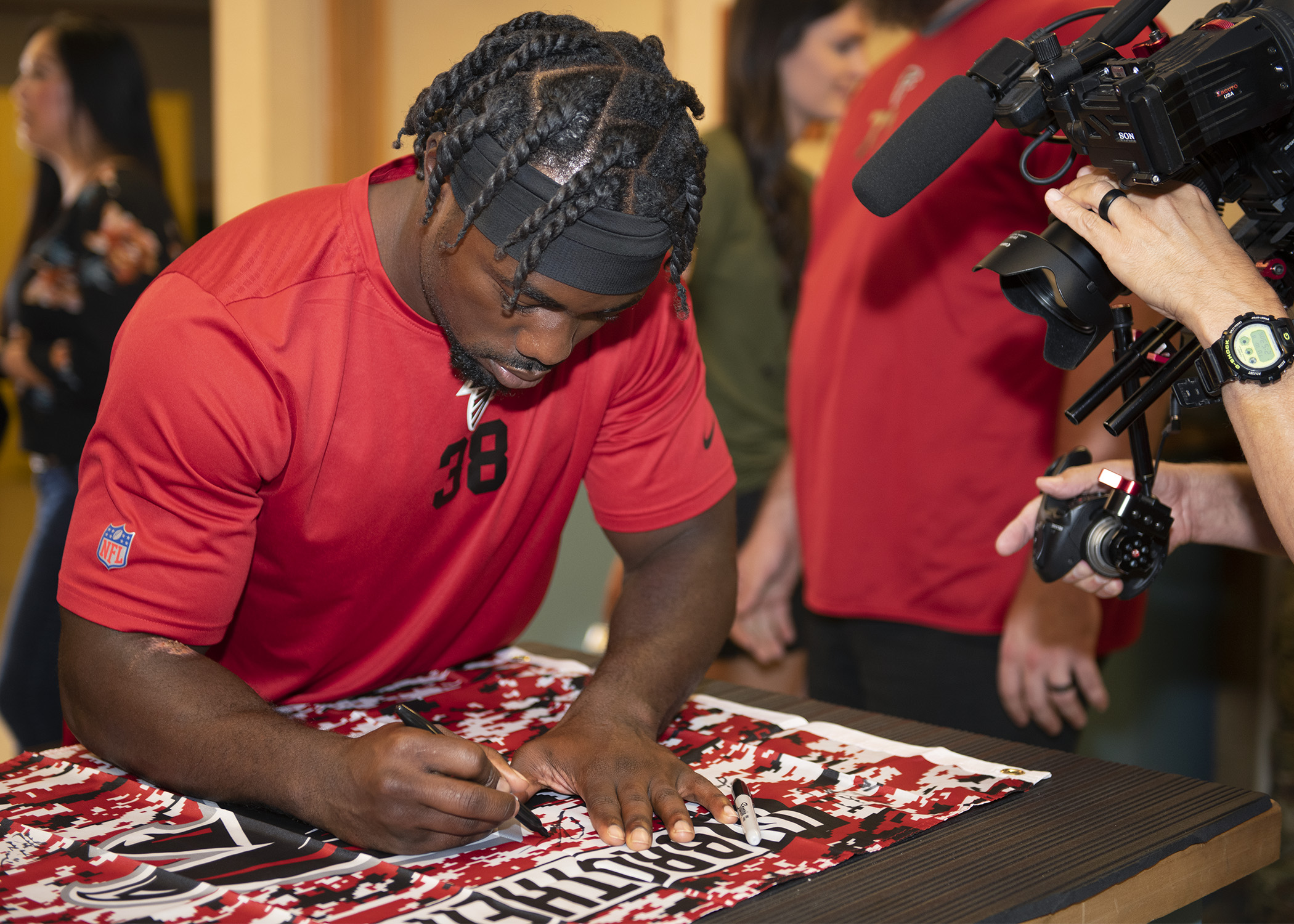
Barner with the Falcons in 2019

On March 14, 2019, Barner signed a one-year contract with the Atlanta Falcons. In Week 11 of the 2019 season, against the Carolina Panthers, he had a 78-yard punt return for a touchdown in the 29–3 victory, earning NFC Special Teams Player of the Week honors.

=== Baltimore Ravens ===
On August 12, 2020, Barner signed a one-year contract with the Baltimore Ravens. He was released during final roster cuts on September 5, 2020.

=== Tampa Bay Buccaneers ===
On September 10, 2020, Barner was signed to the Tampa Bay Buccaneers practice squad. He was elevated to the active roster for the team's weeks 3 and 4 games against the Denver Broncos and Los Angeles Chargers, respectively, and reverted to the practice squad after each game. He was suspended by the NFL for four games after violating the league's performance-enhancing drugs policy on October 6. He was reinstated from suspension and activated back to the practice squad on November 3. Barner was elevated to the active roster again on November 23 for the Week 11 game against the Los Angeles Rams, and reverted to the practice squad again following the game. He was signed to the active roster on December 7. On December 30, Barner was placed on injured reserve. He was designated to return from injured reserve on January 19, 2021, and began practicing with the team again, but the team did not activate him before the end of the postseason. Without Barner, the Buccaneers won Super Bowl LV 31–9 against the Kansas City Chiefs earning Barner a third championship ring.

On December 15, 2021, Barner was signed to the Buccaneers practice squad. After the Buccaneers were eliminated in the Divisional Round of the 2021 playoffs, he signed a reserve/future contract on January 24, 2022. He was placed on injured reserve on August 15, 2022. Barner was released on October 11.

== Career statistics ==
=== NFL ===
Year	Team	Games		Receiving					Rushing					Fumbles	
Year	Team	GP	GS	Rec	Yds	Avg	Lng	TD	Att	Yds	Avg	Lng	TD	Fum	Lost
2013	CAR	8	0	2	7	3.5	5	0	6	7	1.2	2	0	1	0
2015	PHI	10	0	9	22	2.4	12	0	28	124	4.4	19	0	1	1
2016	PHI	13	0	5	42	8.4	15	0	27	129	4.8	19	2	0	0
2017	PHI	13	1	5	56	11.2	22	0	16	57	3.6	18	1	3	0
2018	NE	5	0	0	0	0.0	0	0	19	71	3.7	11	0	0	0
2018	CAR	4	0	1	3	3.0	3	0	0	0	0.0	0	0	1	0
2019	ATL	14	0	6	22	3.7	13	0	4	28	7.0	12	0	4	1
2020	TB	6	0	0	0	0.0	0	0	0	0	0.0	0	0	0	0
Career		73	1	28	152	5.4	22	0	100	416	4.2	19	3	10	2

=== College ===
Year	Team	GP	Rushing					
Year	Team	GP	Att	Yds	Avg	Lng	TD	Y/G
2009	Oregon	13	61	366	6.0	48	3	28.2
2010	Oregon	11	91	551	6.1	41	6	50.1
2011	Oregon	12	152	939	6.2	84	11	78.2
2012	Oregon	13	278	1,767	6.4	80	21	135.9
Total		49	582	3,623	6.2	84	41	73.9

== Personal life ==
Barner was born in Lynwood, California, to parents Gary and Wilhelmenia Barner. He has five older brothers and one older sister. He graduated with a degree in criminology in spring 2012. Kenjon has two sons born in 2013 and 2017.

Barner’s cousin Melvin Carter was elected mayor of St. Paul, Minnesota in November 2017.
