= Dreamius Smith =

American football player (born 1992)

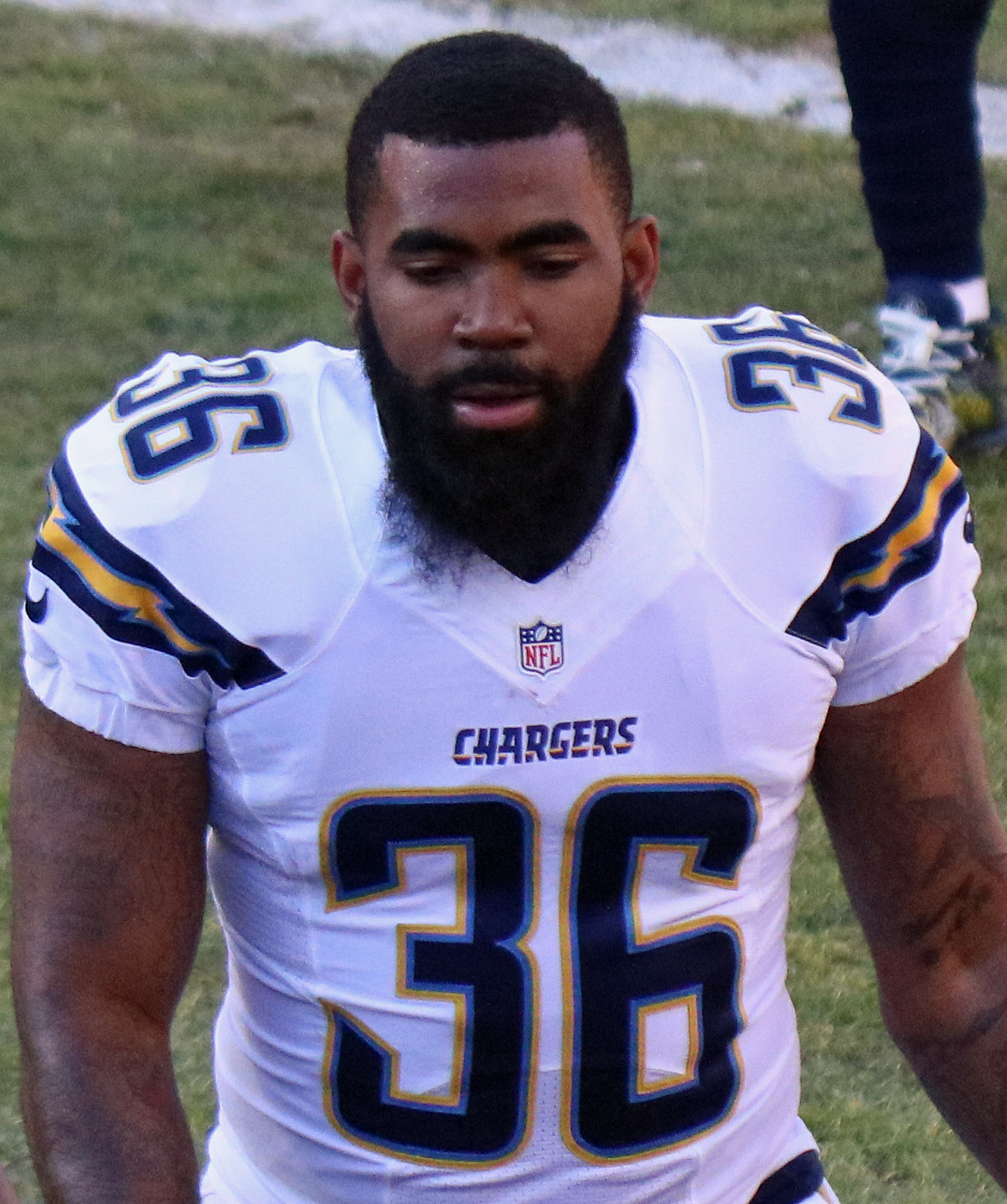
- Smith in 2015.

No. 36
- Position: Running back

Personal information
- Born: September 8, 1992 (age 34); Wichita, Kansas
- Listed height: 5 ft 11 in (1.80 m)
- Listed weight: 225 lb (102 kg)

Career information
- High school: Wichita Heights HS
- College: West Virginia
- NFL draft: 2015: undrafted

Career history
- San Diego Chargers (2015); Pittsburgh Steelers (2016–2017)*
- * Offseason or practice squad member only
- Stats at Pro Football Reference

Dreamius Smith is an American former football running back. He was signed by the San Diego Chargers after going undrafted in the 2015 NFL draft. He attended West Virginia University.

Smith has also played for the Pittsburgh Steelers.

== Professional career ==
=== San Diego Chargers ===
After going undrafted in the 2015 NFL draft, Smith signed with the San Diego Chargers on May 2, 2015. He was released as part of the final preseason cuts on September 5, 2015, and was signed to the Chargers' practice squad the following day. He was released from the practice squad on September 12, 2015. He was re-signed to the practice squad on November 5, 2015. He was promoted to the active roster on December 22, 2015.

On August 30, 2016, Smith was placed on injured reserve. He was released by the Chargers two days later.

=== Pittsburgh Steelers ===
On November 28, 2016, Smith was signed to the Steelers' practice squad. He signed a reserve/future contract with the Steelers on January 24, 2017. He was waived by the Steelers on May 12, 2017.
