= Will Smith (linebacker, born 1992) =

American gridiron football player (born 1992)

No. 58, 40, 37, 57
- Position: Linebacker

Personal information
- Born: January 13, 1992 (age 34); Riverside, California, U.S.
- Listed height: 6 ft 2 in (1.88 m)
- Listed weight: 231 lb (105 kg)

Career information
- High school: Notre Dame (Riverside)
- College: Texas Tech
- NFL draft: 2014: 7th round, 238th overall pick

Career history
- Dallas Cowboys (2014)*; Winnipeg Blue Bombers (2014); Dallas Cowboys (2015)*; Hamilton Tiger-Cats (2016); Winnipeg Blue Bombers (2017)*; Los Angeles Wildcats (2020)
- * Offseason or practice squad member only

Awards and highlights
- First-team All-Big 12 (2013); Holiday Bowl Defensive MVP (2013)
- Stats at Pro Football Reference
- Stats at CFL.ca

William Lamont Smith (born January 13, 1992) is an American former football linebacker. He was selected by the Dallas Cowboys in the seventh round of the 2014 NFL draft. He played college football at Texas Tech University.

== Early life ==
Smith attended Notre Dame High School, where he competed in football, basketball and ran track. He received honorable-mention All-county honors in both football and basketball.

== College career ==
He began his college career playing football at the NCAA Division II level at Northwood University. He appeared in 8 games in 2010 as a freshman, making 22 tackles (one for loss) and one forced fumble. After the season, he transferred to Riverside City College in his hometown

As a sophomore he started 11 games, registering 88 tackles (second on the team), 13 tackles for loss, 1.5 sacks, 4 fumble recoveries, 3 interceptions (one returned for a 75-yard touchdown), while helping the team to a perfect 11–0 record and a number 5 national ranking. At the end of the year, he announced his intention to transfer to NCAA Division I Texas Tech University in 2012.

As a junior, he played in all 13 games (11 starts), collecting 55 tackles (1.5 for loss), 34 solo tackles and 3 quarterback hurries. His performance would earn him a third-team All-Big 12 selection by Phil Steele and an honorable-mention by the AP.

Smith's senior season in 2013 earned him several accolades. He started 13 games, posting 120 tackles (third in the conference), 86 solo tackles (led the conference), 10.5 tackles for loss, 4.5 sacks, and a fumble return for a touchdown. He had 18 tackles against the University of Texas. His mark of 120 tackles was the most by a Red Raider since the NCAA record setting Lawrence Flugence's 193 in 2002.

For his performances throughout the season, Smith earned Holiday Bowl defensive MVP honors, as well as first-team All-Big 12 Conference selections by the Associated Press and the Big 12 Broadcasters.

== Professional career ==
Pre-draft measurables
Height	Weight	40-yard dash	10-yard split	20-yard split	20-yard shuttle	Three-cone drill	Vertical jump	Broad jump	Bench press
6 ft 2 in (1.88 m)	231 lb (105 kg)	4.59 s	1.62 s	2.73 s	4.53 s	7.04 s	37 1/2 in (0.95 m)	9 ft 5 in (2.87 m)	17 reps
All values from Texas Tech Pro Day

=== Dallas Cowboys (first stint) ===
Smith was selected by the Dallas Cowboys in the seventh round (238th overall) of the 2014 NFL draft. He was waived on August 29 and signed to the practice squad. He was released to make room for defensive end Michael Sam on September 3.

=== Winnipeg Blue Bombers (first stint) ===
On October 10, 2014, he was signed by the Winnipeg Blue Bombers of the Canadian Football League (CFL) to their practice roster. He was released on October 29 after playing in one game, so he could re-join the Dallas Cowboys.

=== Dallas Cowboys (second stint) ===
On October 29, 2014, Smith was re-signed to the practice squad. On May 14, 2015, he was cut after rookie minicamp, to make room for tryout linebacker Donnie Baggs. He was re-signed on August 1, taking the roster spot created by the holdout of defensive end Jeremy Mincey. He was released on August 25 with a groin injury.

=== Hamilton Tiger-Cats ===
On May 28, 2016, he was signed by the Hamilton Tiger-Cats of the CFL. He appeared in 11 games as a backup linebacker, posting 3 tackles (one for loss) and 9 special teams tackles.

=== Winnipeg Blue Bombers (second stint) ===
On February 16, 2017, he was signed by the Blue Bombers. He was released on May 1.

=== Los Angeles Wildcats ===
In October 2019, he was selected by the Los Angeles Wildcats in the 2020 XFL Supplemental Draft. In March, amid the COVID-19 pandemic, the league announced that it would be cancelling the rest of the season. Playing in all 5 games, he registered 28 tackles and one interception. He had his contract terminated when the league suspended operations on April 10, 2020.
