= Le'Raven Clark =

American football player (born 1993)

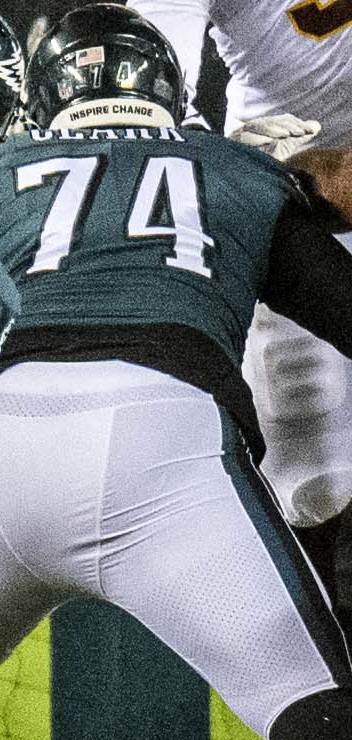
- Clark with the Philadelphia Eagles in 2021

Profile
- Position: Offensive tackle

Personal information
- Born: April 22, 1993 (age 33); Bryan, Texas, U.S.
- Listed height: 6 ft 5 in (1.96 m)
- Listed weight: 319 lb (145 kg)

Career information
- High school: Rockdale (Rockdale, Texas)
- College: Texas Tech (2011–2015)
- NFL draft: 2016: 3rd round, 82nd overall pick

Career history
- Indianapolis Colts (2016–2020); Philadelphia Eagles (2021–2022); Tennessee Titans (2022); Pittsburgh Steelers (2023)*; Philadelphia Eagles (2023–2024)*
- * Offseason or practice squad member only

Awards and highlights
- Super Bowl champion (LIX); Second-team All-American (2015); 3× First-team All-Big 12 (2013, 2014, 2015); Second-team All-Big 12 (2012); Freshman All-American (2012)

Career NFL statistics as of 2024
- Games played: 64
- Games started: 18
- Stats at Pro Football Reference

Le'Raven Clark (born April 22, 1993) is an American professional football offensive tackle. He played college football for the Texas Tech Red Raiders, and was selected by the Indianapolis Colts in the third round (82nd overall) of the 2016 NFL draft.

== Early life ==
Clark attended Rockdale High School in his hometown of Rockdale, Texas, where he was a letterman in football, basketball, and track. In football, he earned All-State honors and was selected as an Under Armour All-American.

In track & field, Clark was one of the states top performers in the throwing events. At the 2009 Brenham Regional Qualifier, he took bronze in both the shot put (15.94 m) and the discus (52.03 m). At the 3A Regional, got 3rd in the shot put and qualified for state in the discus by placing 2nd. His personal-bests are 16.58 meters in the shot put and 55.47 meters in the discus throw.

== College career ==
Coming in as a 4-star recruit out of high school, Clark was redshirted his freshman year in 2011. Clark started for the Red Raiders for the first time during his redshirt freshman year at the right guard position. He started all 13 games. For his performance during the season, Clark was named a Freshman All-American by the Football Writers Association of America and Scout.com. He earned All-Big 12 Conference honors from Phil Steele. Clark was also named an Academic All-Big 12 2nd team selection.

During his sophomore year in 2013, Clark was moved to left tackle to replace All-Big 12 and current New England Patriots player LaAdrian Waddle. Prior to the beginning of the season, Clark was named a pre-season All-Big 12 selection, and was placed on the watchlists for the Outland Trophy and the Lombardi Award. Following the conclusion of the season, Clark earned Associated Press All-Big 12 1st team honors.

Prior to the 2014 season, Clark was again named to the Outland Trophy and Lombardi Award watchlist. He also earned a 2nd Team All-American selection by USA Today. He was named to the Associated Press All-Big 12 1st team following the season.

Following the 2015 season, Clark earned his third 1st Team All-Big 12 Conference selection, and was selected as a 2nd Team All-American by CBS Sports.

== Professional career ==
Pre-draft measurables
Height	Weight	Arm length	Hand span	40-yard dash	10-yard split	20-yard split	Vertical jump	Broad jump	Bench press
6 ft 5 1/4 in (1.96 m)	316 lb (143 kg)	36 1/8 in (0.92 m)	11 7/8 in (0.30 m)	5.16 s	1.80 s	2.99 s	30 in (0.76 m)	9 ft 1 in (2.77 m)	20 reps
All values from NFL Combine and Pro Day

=== Indianapolis Colts ===
Clark was selected in the third round (82nd overall) of the 2016 NFL draft by the Indianapolis Colts. He signed with the Colts on May 25, 2016. He played in eight games with three starts as a rookie. In 2017, he played in 15 games, starting five at right guard.

On March 20, 2020, Clark re-signed with the Colts. He started three games in place of injuries before suffering a torn Achilles in Week 13. He was placed on injured reserve on December 9, 2020.

=== Philadelphia Eagles (first stint) ===
On May 19, 2021, Clark signed with the Philadelphia Eagles. He was released on August 31, 2021, and re-signed to the practice squad the next day. He was promoted to the active roster on December 8 and signed a contract extension that runs through the 2022 season. He was placed on the COVID-19 list on December 22 and removed on December 29.

On August 30, 2022, Clark was waived by the Eagles and signed to the practice squad the next day.

=== Tennessee Titans ===
On September 27, 2022, Clark was signed by the Tennessee Titans off the Eagles practice squad.

=== Pittsburgh Steelers ===
On March 24, 2023, Clark signed a one-year contract with the Pittsburgh Steelers. He was released on August 28, 2023.

=== Philadelphia Eagles (second stint) ===
On August 31, 2023, Clark was signed to the Eagles practice squad. He signed a reserve/future contract on January 18, 2024. He was placed on injured reserve on May 3, 2024. He won a Super Bowl championship when the Eagles defeated the Kansas City Chiefs 40–22 in Super Bowl LIX.
