= 2013 Holiday Bowl =

2013 National University Holiday Bowl
- 36th Holiday Bowl Game
Arizona State Sun Devils	Texas Tech Red Raiders
(10–3)	(7–5)
Pac-12	Big 12
23	37
Head coach: Todd Graham	Head coach: Kliff Kingsbury
AP / Coaches / BCS; 16 / 17 / 14
	1	2	3	4	Total
Arizona State	6	7	7	3	23
Texas Tech	13	14	10	0	37
- Date: December 30, 2013
- Season: 2013
- Stadium: Qualcomm Stadium
- Location: San Diego, California
- MVP: Offense:Davis Webb; Defense:Will Smith
- Favorite: Arizona St. by 14
- Referee: Matt Austin (SEC)
- Attendance: 52,930
- Payout: US$2.075 million per team

United States TV coverage
- Network: ESPN
- Announcers: Joe Tessitore (Play-by-play); Matt Millen (Analyst); Maria Taylor (Sideline)

The 2013 Holiday Bowl was an American college football bowl game that was played on December 30, 2013, at Qualcomm Stadium in San Diego, California. The 36th edition of the Holiday Bowl, it featured the Texas Tech Red Raiders of the Big 12 Conference and the Arizona State Sun Devils of the Pac-12 Conference. It was one of the 2013–14 bowl games that concluded the 2013 FBS football season. The game started at 7:15 p.m. PST and was telecast on ESPN. It was sponsored by National University and was officially known as the National University Holiday Bowl. Texas Tech defeated Arizona State by a score of 37–23.

This was only the second meeting of the teams. Although both the Red Raiders and Sun Devils were members of the Border Conference from 1932–1956, neither team faced the other until the 1999 season when both universities were members of their current athletic conferences. The Red Raiders lost to the Sun Devils 13–31, in both teams' season opener at Sun Devil Stadium in Tempe, Arizona.

== Teams ==
=== Arizona State ===
The Arizona State Sun Devils won the South Division Championship of the Pac-12 Conference after they defeated the UCLA Bruins on November 23, 2013. However, they lost the Pac-12 Championship Game to the Stanford Cardinal 38–14. Earlier in the season, the Sun Devils lost to the Cardinal 28–42, and the Notre Dame Fighting Irish 34–37.

=== Texas Tech ===
The Texas Tech Red Raiders won their first seven games this season, but lost their last five games, including the last game to Texas Longhorns, 16–41. Texas Tech, along with Arkansas, Auburn, Baylor, Missouri, Oklahoma, Oklahoma State, and Stanford, are the only teams to face four ranked opponents in AP Poll in the teams' final six games.

== Game summary ==
=== Scoring summary ===
Scoring summary

Quarter	Time	Drive			Team	Scoring information	Score	
Quarter	Time	Plays	Yards	TOP	Team	Scoring information	Arizona State	Texas Tech
1	9:41	14	77	5:19	TTU	Rodney Hall 1-yard touchdown reception from Davis Webb, Ryan Bustin kick no good	0	6
1	6:27	6	68	1:42	TTU	Jakeem Grant 18-yard touchdown reception from Webb, Bustin kick good	0	13
1	4:26	4	52	2:01	ASU	44-yard field goal by Zane Gonzalez	3	13
1	2:22	4	13	2:04	ASU	31-yard field goal by Gonzalez	6	13
2	14:30	7	82	2:52	TTU	Bradley Marquez 23-yard touchdown reception from Webb, Bustin kick good	6	20
2	10:08	7	81	2:41	TTU	Grant 21-yard touchdown reception from Webb, Bustin kick good	6	27
2	7:52	2	27	0:22	ASU	D. J. Foster 20-yard touchdown run, Gonzalez kick good	13	27
3	13:13	6	78	1:47	ASU	Taylor Kelly 44-yard touchdown run, Gonzalez kick good	20	27
3	13:02				TTU	Kickoff returned 90 yards for touchdown by Reginald Davis III, Bustin kick good	20	34
3	5:28	14	63	5:27	TTU	23-yard field goal by Bustin	20	37
4	13:39	14	69	4:24	ASU	33-yard field goal by Gonzalez	23	37
"TOP" = time of possession. For other American football terms, see Glossary of American football.							23	37

=== Statistics ===
Statistics	ASU	TTU
First downs	20	24
Total offense, plays – yards	78 – 412	75 – 484
Rushes-yards (net)	49 – 287 (5.9)	31 – 81 (2.4)
Passing yards (net)	125 (4.3)	403 (9.8)
Passes, Comp-Att-Int	16-29-1	28-41-0
Time of Possession	29:19	30:41
