= Bradley Marquez =

American football player (born 1992)

No. 12, 15
- Position: Wide receiver

Personal information
- Born: December 14, 1992 (age 33); Odessa, Texas, U.S.
- Listed height: 5 ft 10 in (1.78 m)
- Listed weight: 205 lb (93 kg)

Career information
- High school: Odessa
- College: Texas Tech (2011–2014)
- NFL draft: 2015: undrafted

Career history
- St. Louis / Los Angeles Rams (2015–2017); Detroit Lions (2017–2018)

Career NFL statistics
- Receptions: 16
- Receiving yards: 125
- Receiving touchdowns: 0
- Total tackles: 16
- Forced fumbles: 1
- Stats at Pro Football Reference

Bradley Jerrill Marquez (born December 14, 1992) is an American former professional football player who was a wide receiver in the National Football League (NFL). He played college football for the Texas Tech Red Raiders. He is also a member of the New York Mets organization where he played minor league baseball from 2012 to 2013 and again in 2019.

== Early life ==
Marquez played high school football, ran track, and played baseball at Odessa High School in Odessa, Texas. He played football at the running back position, and baseball at the shortstop position. Marquez was ranked as a 4-star prospect by Scout.com and an All-American prospect by PrepStar College Recruiting. His father, Brad Givens, also played for Odessa High. As a sophomore, Marquez rushed 203 times for 1,743 yards and 21 touchdowns, earning Associated Press All-State 2nd Team honors. As a junior, Marquez rushed 77 times for 492 yards before being sidelined by an elbow tendon tear. During his senior year, Marquez accrued 2,210 rushing yards and 29 touchdowns, becoming the school's new all-time leading rusher.

Marquez accepted a scholarship to play football collegiately for Texas Tech over several schools including the Oklahoma Sooners. Additionally, Marquez was selected by the New York Mets in the 16th round of the 2011 Major League Baseball draft. Marquez's first season in the minors was cut short by a quadriceps injury.

== College football and baseball ==
Selected in the 16th round of the 2011 Major League Draft, Marquez arranged a two-sport deal which allowed him to attend Texas Tech to play football while playing baseball for the Kingsport Mets in the spring. Marquez forfeited $250,000 of his $325,000 signing bonus by not choosing to play baseball full-time by September 15, 2013.

Marquez earned playing time in all 12 games, with 4 starts. In the season opening September 9, 2011 game against Texas State, Marquez caught his first receiving touchdown on a diving catch, becoming the first true freshman wide receiver to do so in a season opener for the school in 17 years. Marquez would finish the season contributing on special teams and at the receiver position, accruing 25 receptions for 240 yards with 1 receiving touchdown.

Marquez would play in 6 games during the 2012 season, before suffering a season ending knee injury in the October 13, 2012 upset against #5 West Virginia. Marquez earned Academic All-Big 12 Conference 1st Team honors following the season.

In 2013, Marquez started in all 13 games in his junior season. During the October 12, 2013 game against Iowa State, Marquez earned his first career 100-yard receiving game. Marquez would contribute in every game and ended the season with 49 receptions, 633 receiving yards, and six touchdowns. Marquez again earned Academic All-Big 12 Conference 1st Team honors, in addition to All-Big 12 honorable mention honors.

Prior to the start of the 2014 season during spring football practices, Marquez announced that he would forgo playing minor league baseball in the summer to concentrate on football for his senior season.

In March 2019, Marquez returned to the Mets at their minor league spring training camp. He was assigned to the Columbia Fireflies of the Class A South Atlantic League on April 8 and made his first appearance since July 28, 2013 that night.

== Professional career ==
Pre-draft measurables
Height	Weight	Arm length	Hand span	Wingspan	40-yard dash	10-yard split	20-yard split	20-yard shuttle	Three-cone drill	Vertical jump	Broad jump	Bench press
5 ft 10 1/2 in (1.79 m)	196 lb (89 kg)	30 1/2 in (0.77 m)	9 in (0.23 m)	6 ft 3 in (1.91 m)	4.54 s	1.63 s	2.59 s	4.04 s	6.80 s	38.0 in (0.97 m)	10 ft 3 in (3.12 m)	11 reps
All values from Pro Day

=== St. Louis / Los Angeles Rams ===
Marquez signed with the St. Louis Rams after going undrafted in the 2015 NFL draft. He played in all 16 games as a rookie with one start recording 13 receptions for 88 yards as well as contributing on special teams with 11 tackles.

In 2016, Marquez played in 14 games recording 3 receptions for 37 yards before being placed on injured reserve on December 23, 2016.

On August 7, 2017, Marquez was waived/injured by the Rams and placed on injured reserve. He was released by the Rams on November 6, 2017.

=== Detroit Lions ===
On November 10, 2017, Marquez was signed to the Detroit Lions' practice squad. He was promoted to the active roster on November 27, 2017.

On September 11, 2018, Marquez was waived by the Lions.

== Personal life ==
Marquez was born to Veronica Marquez and Brad Givens. He is an exercise and sports science major.
