= 2013 Southeastern Louisiana Lions football team =

American college football season

2013 Southeastern Louisiana Lions football
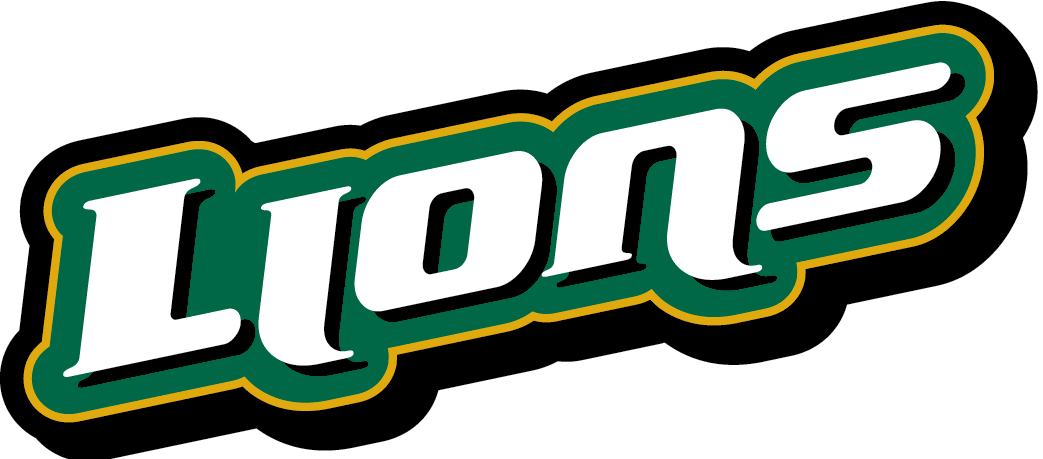

Southland champion

FCS Playoffs Quarterfinals, L 17–20 vs. New Hampshire
- Conference: Southland Conference

Ranking
- Sports Network: No. 6
- FCS Coaches: No. 6
- Record: 11–3 (7–0 Southland)
- Head coach: Ron Roberts (2nd season)
- Offensive coordinator: Greg Stevens (2nd season)
- Offensive scheme: Spread
- Defensive coordinator: Pete Golding (2nd season)
- Base defense: 4–2–5
- Home stadium: Strawberry Stadium

2013 Southland Conference football standings
	Conf.			Overall
Team	W		L	W		L
No. 6 Southeastern Louisiana $^	7	–	0	11	–	3
No. 11 McNeese State ^	6	–	1	10	–	3
No. 14 Sam Houston State ^	4	–	3	9	–	5
Central Arkansas	4	–	3	7	–	5
Northwestern State	3	–	4	6	–	6
Lamar	2	–	5	5	–	7
Nicholls State	1	–	6	4	–	8
Stephen F. Austin	1	–	6	3	–	9
$ – Conference champion; ^ – FCS playoff participant; Rankings from The Sports Network poll

The 2013 Southeastern Louisiana Lions football team represented Southeastern Louisiana University in the 2013 NCAA Division I FCS football season. The Lions were led by second-year head coach Ron Roberts and played their home games at Strawberry Stadium. They were a member of the Southland Conference. They finished the season 11–3, 7–0 in Southland play to win the Southland Conference championship. They received the conference's automatic bid to the FCS Playoffs where they defeated fellow Southland member Sam Houston State in the second round before losing in the quarterfinals to New Hampshire.

== Roster ==
2013 Southeastern Louisiana Lions football team roster
Players			Coaches
Offense: Pos. / # / Name / Class	Defense: Pos. / # / Name / Class	Special teams: Pos. / # / Name / Class	Head coach: Ron Roberts (Memphis); Coordinators/assistant coaches: E. K. Franks (Kansas State) Assoc. head coach/running backs; Pete Golding (Delta State) Defensive coordinator; Brandon Lacy (Kansas) Defensive line/recruiting coordinator; Travis Mikel (Delta State) Offensive line/director of football operations; Sean O'Sullivan (Mars Hill) Tight ends/video coordinator; Chet Pobolish (Emporia State) Wide receivers/special teams; Karl Scott (McMurry) Defensive backs/linebackers; Greg Stevens (Eastern Oregon) Offensive coordinator/quarterbacks; Legend: (C) Team captain; (S) Suspended; (I) Ineligible; Injured; Redshirt; Roster

== Schedule ==
Date	Time	Opponent	Rank	Site	TV	Result	Attendance
August 29	7:00 pm	Southeast Missouri State*		Strawberry Stadium; Hammond, LA	Southeastern Channel^	W 45–7	5,820
September 7	11:00 am	at No. 24 (FBS) TCU*		Amon G. Carter Stadium; Fort Worth, TX	FSSW	L 17–38	41,170
September 14	6:00 pm	at No. 6 South Dakota State*		Coughlin–Alumni Stadium; Brookings, SD		L 26–34	13,456
September 21	2:00 pm	at Samford*		Seibert Stadium; Homewood, AL	Samford Showcase	W 34–31	4,598
October 5	7:00 pm	Incarnate Word*		Strawberry Stadium; Hammond, LA	Southeastern Channel^	W 35–3	4,235
October 12	7:00 pm	Stephen F. Austin		Strawberry Stadium; Hammond, LA	ESPN3	W 56–14	5,080
October 19	6:00 pm	at Northwestern State		Harry Turpin Stadium; Natchitoches, LA (rivalry)	Demon TV	W 37–22	8,383
October 26	7:00 pm	Lamar^{†}		Strawberry Stadium; Hammond, LA	ESPN3	W 56–34	6,877
November 2	7:00 pm	at No. 4 McNeese State	No. 25	Cowboy Stadium; Lake Charles, LA		W 41–7	14,898
November 9	7:00 pm	at Central Arkansas	No. 16	Estes Stadium; Conway, AR	ESPN3	W 58–31	5,427
November 16	3:00 pm	No. 4 Sam Houston State	No. 14	Strawberry Stadium; Hammond, LA	SLCTV	W 34–21	7,302
November 21	6:00 pm	Nicholls State	No. 8	Strawberry Stadium; Hammond, LA (River Bell Classic)	ESPN3, WHNO^	W 52–27	6,821
December 7	7:00 pm	No. 14 Sam Houston State*	No. 7	Strawberry Stadium; Hammond, LA (NCAA Division I Second Round)	ESPN3	W 30–29	6,874
December 14	6:00 pm	No. 15 New Hampshire*	No. 7	Strawberry Stadium; Hammond, LA (NCAA Division I Quarterfinal)	ESPN3	L 17–20	5,886
*Non-conference game; ^{†}Homecoming; Rankings from The Sports Network Poll released prior to the game; All times are in Central time

^Games aired on tape delay.

== Game summaries ==
=== Southeast Missouri State ===
Southeast Missouri State at Southeastern Louisiana

Team	1	2	3	4	Total
Redhawks	7	0	0	0	7
• Lions	14	10	7	14	45

- Date: August 29
- Location: Strawberry Stadium
  Hammond, LA
- Game start: 7:00 PM CST
- Elapsed time: 2:48
- Game attendance: 5,820
- Referee: Stacey Hardin
- TV announcers (Southeastern Channel): Chris Coleman, Allen Waddell, and Robert Scarpoli

Scoring summary
1	13:30	SLU	Bryan Bennett 3-yard touchdown run, Seth Sebastian kick good	SLU 7–0
1	7:45	SLU	Xavier Roberson 2-yard touchdown run, Seth Sebastian kick good	SLU 14–0
1	2:27	SEMO	Lennies McFerren 6-yard touchdown run, Ryan McCrum kick good	SLU 14–7
2	13:03	SLU	Kod Sutton 4-yard touchdown run, Seth Sebastian kick good	SLU 21–7
2	9:31	SLU	Seth Sebastian 45-yard Field Goal	SLU 24–7
3	7:27	SLU	Bryan Bennett 30-yard touchdown run, Seth Sebastian kick good	SLU 31–7
4	14:30	SLU	Bryan Bennett 7-yard touchdown run, Seth Sebastian kick good	SLU 38–7
4	11:34	SLU	Jordan Barnett 1-yard touchdown run, Seth Sebastian kick good	SLU 45–7

=== TCU ===
Southeastern Louisiana at TCU

Team	1	2	3	4	Total
Lions	0	14	0	3	17
• #24 (FBS) Horned Frogs	7	10	14	7	38

- Date: September 7
- Location: Amon G. Carter Stadium
  Ft. Worth, TX
- Game start: 11:07 AM CST
- Elapsed time: 3:10
- Game attendance: 41,170
- Game weather: 92 °F (33 °C), Sunny, 48% Humidity, winds S 9mph
- Referee: Scott Novak
- TV announcers (FSN): Ron Thulin, Dave Lapham & Jim Knox

Scoring summary
1	2:32	TCU	Waymon James 1-yard touchdown run, Jaden Oberkrom kick good	TCU 7–0
2	5:25	SLU	Bryan Bennett 6-yard touchdown run, Seth Sebastian kick good	Tied 7–7
2	4:23	TCU	B.J. Catalon 15-yard touchdown run, Jaden Oberkom kick good	TCU 14–7
2	2:38	SLU	Jeff Smiley 66-yard touchdown pass from Bryan Bennett, Seth Sebastian kick good	Tied 14–14
2	0:00	TCU	Jaden Oberkrom 46-yard Field Goal	TCU 17–14
3	8:32	TCU	Brandon Carter 5-yard touchdown run, Jaden Oberkrom kick good	TCU 24–14
3	7:52	TCU	Josh Doctson 27-yard touchdown pass from Trevone Boykin, Jaden Oberkrom kick good	TCU 31–14
4	14:56	TCU	Aaron Greene 9-yard touchdown pass from Trevone Boykin, Jaden Oberkrom kick good	TCU 38–14
4	3:25	SLU	Seth Sebastian 31-yard Field Goal	TCU 38–17

=== South Dakota State ===
Southeastern Louisiana at South Dakota State

Team	1	2	3	4	Total
Lions	10	3	6	7	26
• #6 Jackrabbits	0	7	13	14	34

- Date: September 14
- Location: Coughlin–Alumni Stadium
  Brookings, SD
- Game start: 6:00 PM CST
- Elapsed time: 2:50
- Game attendance: 13,456
- Game weather: 68 °F (20 °C), Overcast, winds SSE 5-10mph
- Referee: Tim O'Dey

Scoring summary
1	11:25	SLU	Rasheed Harrell 1-yard touchdown run, Seth Sebastian kick good	SLU 7–0
1	4:03	SLU	Seth Sebastian 35-yard Field Goal	SLU 10–0
2	8:12	SDSU	Zach Zenner 2-yard touchdown run, Justin Syrovatka kick good	SLU 10–7
2	0:20	SLU	Seth Sebastian 36-yard Field Goal	SLU 13–7
3	11:38	SLU	Bryan Bennett 1-yard touchdown run, Jeremy Myers 2-point rush failed	SLU 19–7
3	11:25	SDSU	Zach Zenner 75-yard touchdown run, Justin Syrovatka kick good	SLU 19–14
3	0:20	SDSU	Austin Sumner 20-yard touchdown run, Austin Somner 2-point conversion pass failed	SDSU 20–19
4	4:28	SDSU	Zach Zenner 10-yard touchdown run, Justin Syrovatka kick good	SDSU 27–19
4	2:25	SDSU	Dallas Brown 52-yard Interception returned for a touchdown, Justin Syrovatka kick good	SDSU 34–19
4	2:14	SLU	Xavier Roberson 82-yard kickoff return for a touchdown, Seth Sebastian kick good	SDSU 34–26

=== Samford ===
Southeastern Louisiana at Samford

Team	1	2	3	4	Total
• Lions	10	14	3	7	34
Bulldogs	7	0	7	17	31

- Date: September 21
- Location: Seibert Stadium
  Homewood, AL
- Game start: 2:00 PM CST
- Elapsed time: 3:22
- Game attendance: 4,598
- Game weather: 68 °F (20 °C), Raining
- Referee: Rodney Burnette
- TV announcers (Samford Sports TV): Mike Grace, Scot Harrison, David McDaniel

Scoring summary
1	13:12	SAM	Jerry Mathis 4-yard touchdown pass from Andy Summerlin, Warren Handrahan kick good	SAM 7–0
1	7:39	SLU	Seth Sebastian 30-yard Field Goal	SAM 7–3
1	1:45	SLU	Kody Sutton 1-yard touchdown run, Seth Sebastian kick good	SLU 10–3
2	10:43	SLU	Xavier Roberson 1-yard touchdown run, Seth Sebastian kick good	SLU 17–3
2	4:27	SLU	Kody Sutton 3-yard touchdown run, Seth Sebastian kick good	SLU 24–3
3	8:29	SAM	Fabian Truss 43-yard touchdown pass from Kelsey Pope, Warren Handrahan kick good	SLU 24–14
3	4:37	SLU	Seth Sebastian 32-yard Field Goal	SLU 27–14
4	14:50	SLU	Isaiah Kepley 25-yard touchdown pass from Jordan Barnett, Seth Sebastian kick good	SLU 34–14
4	11:12	SAM	Warren Handrahan 32-yard Field Goal	SLU 34–17
4	7:17	SAM	Karel Hamilton 16-yard touchdown pass from Andy Summerlin, Warren Handrahan kick good	SLU 34–24
4	2:57	SAM	Javian Ramson 66-yard touchdown pass from Andy Summerlin, Warren Handrahan kick good	SLU 34–31

=== Incarnate Word ===
Incarnate Word at Southeastern Louisiana

Team	1	2	3	4	Total
Cardinals	0	3	0	0	3
• Lions	14	7	7	7	35

- Date: October 5
- Location: Strawberry Stadium
  Hammond, LA
- Game start: 7:00 PM CST
- Elapsed time: 2:49
- Game attendance: 4,235
- Referee: Ken Ray
- TV announcers (Southeastern Channel): Chris Coleman, Allen Waddell, &

Scoring summary
1	13:12	SLU	Marquis Hayes 41-yard touchdown pass from Bryan Bennett, Seth Sebastian kick good	SLU 7–0
1	0:57	SLU	Rasheed Harrell 5-yard touchdown run, Seth Sebastian kick good	SLU 14–0
2	8:30	UIW	Jake Wilcox 42-yard Field Goal	SLU 14–3
2	0:03	SLU	Marice Sutton 67-yard Interception returned for a touchdown, Seth Sebastian kick good	SLU 21–3
3	5:10	SLU	Bryan Bennett 1-yard touchdown run, Seth Sebastian kick good	SLU 28–3
4	7:38	SLU	Jeff Smiley 17-yard touchdown pass from Bryan Bennett, Seth Sebastian kick good	SLU 35–3

=== Stephen F. Austin ===
Stephen F. Austin at Southeastern Louisiana

Team	1	2	3	4	Total
Lumberjacks	7	0	7	0	14
• Lions	21	21	7	7	56

- Date: October 12
- Location: Strawberry Stadium
  Hammond, LA
- Game start: 7:05 PM CST
- Elapsed time: 3:10
- Game attendance: 5,080
- Game weather: 77 °F (25 °C), Cloudy
- Referee: Alan Eck
- TV announcers (ESPN3): Lincoln Rose and Rene Nadeau

Scoring summary
1	13:11	SLU	Bryan Bennett 53-yard touchdown run, Seth Sebastian kick good	SLU 7–0
1	11:10	SLU	Rasheed Harrell 4-yard touchdown run, Seth Sebastian kick good	SLU 14–0
1	6:30	SFA	Gus Johnson 3-yard touchdown run, Jordan Wiggs kick good	SLU 14–7
1	2:33	SLU	Marice Sutton 45-yard Interception returned for a touchdown, Seth Sebastian kick good	SLU 21–7
2	6:32	SLU	Jeff Smiley 15-yard touchdown pass from Bryan Bennett, Seth Sebastian kick good	SLU 28–7
2	3:21	SLU	Tony McCrea 82-yard touchdown pass from Bryan Bennett, Seth Sebastian kick good	SLU 35–7
2	0:34	SLU	Marquis Fruge' 77-yard touchdown pass from Bryan Bennett, Seth Sebastian kick good	SLU 42–7
3	13:02	SLU	Chris Malott 85-yard touchdown pass from Bryan Bennett, Seth Sebastian kick good	SLU 49–7
3	9:47	SFA	Braxton Bearden 3-yard touchdown pass from Brady Attaway, Jordan Wiggs kick good	SLU 49–14
4	2:58	SLU	Darius Guy 20-yard touchdown run, Seth Sebastian kick good	SLU 56–14

=== Northwestern State ===
Southeastern Louisiana at Northwestern State

Team	1	2	3	4	Total
Lions	0	0	0	0	0
Demons	0	0	0	0	0

- Date: October 19
- Location: Harry Turpin Stadium
  Natchitoches, LA

=== Lamar ===
Lamar at Southeastern Louisiana

Team	1	2	3	4	Total
Cardinals	0	0	0	0	0
Lions	0	0	0	0	0

- Date: October 26
- Location: Strawberry Stadium
  Hammond, LA
- Television network: ESPN3

=== McNeese State ===
Southeastern Louisiana at McNeese State

Team	1	2	3	4	Total
Lions	0	0	0	0	0
Cowboys	0	0	0	0	0

- Date: November 2
- Location: Cowboy Stadium
  Lake Charles, LA

=== Central Arkansas ===
Southeastern Louisiana at Central Arkansas

Team	1	2	3	4	Total
Lions	0	0	0	0	0
Bears	0	0	0	0	0

- Date: November 9
- Location: Estes Stadium
  Conway, AR
- Television network: ESPN3

=== Sam Houston State ===
Sam Houston State at Southeastern Louisiana

Team	1	2	3	4	Total
Bearkats	0	0	0	0	0
Lions	0	0	0	0	0

- Date: November 16
- Location: Strawberry Stadium
  Hammond, LA
- Television network: SLCTV

=== Nicholls State ===
Nicholls State at Southeastern Louisiana

Team	1	2	3	4	Total
Colonels	0	0	0	0	0
Lions	0	0	0	0	0

- Date: November 21
- Location: Strawberry Stadium
  Hammond, LA

== Ranking movements ==
Ranking movements Legend: ██ Increase in ranking ██ Decrease in ranking — = Not ranked RV = Received votes
	Week														
Poll	Pre	1	2	3	4	5	6	7	8	9	10	11	12	13	Final
Sports Network	RV	RV	RV	RV	RV	RV	RV	RV	RV	25	16	14	8	7	6
Coaches	—	—	—	—	—	—	—	RV	RV	25	17	14	10	7	6
