= 2013 Northwestern State Demons football team =

American college football season

2013 Northwestern State Demons football
- Conference: Southland Conference
- Record: 6–6 (3–4 Southland)
- Head coach: Jay Thomas (1st season)
- Offensive coordinator: Robby Brown (1st season)
- Defensive coordinator: Chris Boone (1st season)
- Home stadium: Harry Turpin Stadium

2013 Southland Conference football standings
	Conf.			Overall
Team	W		L	W		L
No. 6 Southeastern Louisiana $^	7	–	0	11	–	3
No. 11 McNeese State ^	6	–	1	10	–	3
No. 14 Sam Houston State ^	4	–	3	9	–	5
Central Arkansas	4	–	3	7	–	5
Northwestern State	3	–	4	6	–	6
Lamar	2	–	5	5	–	7
Nicholls State	1	–	6	4	–	8
Stephen F. Austin	1	–	6	3	–	9
$ – Conference champion; ^ – FCS playoff participant; Rankings from The Sports Network poll

The 2013 Northwestern State Demons football team represented Northwestern State University as a member of the Southland Conference during the 2013 NCAA Division I FCS football season. Led by first-year head coach Jay Thomas, the Demons compiled an overall record of 6–6 with a mark of 3–4 in conference play, placing fifth in the Southland. Northwestern State played home games at Harry Turpin Stadium in Natchitoches, Louisiana.

== Schedule ==
Date	Time	Opponent	Site	TV	Result	Attendance
August 29	6:00 pm	at Missouri State*	Plaster Sports Complex; Springfield, MO	Mediacom	W 23–17	10,147
September 7	6:00 pm	Southern*	Harry Turpin Stadium; Natchitoches, LA	DemonTV	W 55–14	14,873
September 14	6:00 pm	at Cincinnati*	Nippert Stadium; Cincinnati, OH	ESPN3	L 9–66	30,384
September 21	2:00 pm	at UAB*	Legion Field; Birmingham, AL		L 28–52	8,723
September 28	6:00 pm	Langston*	Harry Turpin Stadium; Natchitoches, LA	DSC	W 37–0	9,338
October 12	3:00 pm	at Nicholls State	John L. Guidry Stadium; Thibodaux, LA (NSU Challenge)	SLCTV	L 21–33	5,111
October 19	6:00 pm	Southeastern Louisiana	Harry Turpin Stadium; Natchitoches, LA (rivalry)	DSC	L 22–37	8,383
October 26	2:00 pm	at No. 7 Sam Houston State	Bowers Stadium; Huntsville, TX	DSC	L 10–44	5,527
November 2	7:00 pm	No. 18 Central Arkansas	Harry Turpin Stadium; Natchitoches, LA	ESPN3	W 31–28	5,872
November 9	3:00 pm	Lamar	Harry Turpin Stadium; Natchitoches, LA	SLCTV	W 37–28	3,357
November 16	7:00 pm	at No. 9 McNeese State	Cowboy Stadium; Lake Charles, LA (rivalry)	ESPN3	L 17–43	15,003
November 23	3:00 pm	Stephen F. Austin	Harry Turpin Stadium; Natchitoches, LA (Chief Caddo)	DSC	W 40–27	3,117
*Non-conference game; Rankings from The Sports Network Poll released prior to the game; All times are in Central time

== Game summaries ==
=== Missouri State ===
Northwestern State at Missouri State

Team	1	2	3	4	Total
• Demons	0	10	7	6	23
Bears	0	7	10	0	17

- Date: August 29
- Location: Plaster Sports Complex
  Springfield, MO
- Game start: 6:05 PM CST
- Elapsed time: 3:12
- Game attendance: 10,147
- Game weather: 92 °F (33 °C), partly cloudy, winds SW at 7mph
- Referee: Larry Smith
- TV announcers (Mediacom): Don West and Mike McClure

Scoring summary
2	14:20	NWLA	Daniel Taylor 30-yard touchdown run, Chris Moore kick good	NWLA 7–0
2	9:17	MSU	Kierra Harris 1-yard touchdown run, Austin Witmer kick good	Tie 7–7
2	0:00	NWLA	Chris Moore 44-yard Field Goal	NWLA 10–7
3	13:14	MSU	Kierra Harris 1-yard touchdown run, Austin Witmer kick good	MSU 1410
3	8:57	MSU	Austin Witmer 42-yard Field Goal	MSU 17–10
3	2:28	NWLA	Zach Adkins 4-yard touchdown run, Chris Moore kick good	Tie 17–17
4	14:36	NWLA	Shakeir Ryan 51-yard touchdown pass from Zach Adkins, Chris Moore kick blocked	NWLA 23–17

=== Southern ===
Southern at Northwestern State

Team	1	2	3	4	Total
Jaguars	0	0	0	0	0
• Demons	10	21	7	17	55

- Date: September 7
- Location: Harry Turpin Stadium
  Natchitoches, LA
- Game start: 6:00 PM CST
- Elapsed time: 3:07
- Game attendance: 14,873
- Game weather: 95 °F (35 °C), partly cloudy, winds ESE at 7mph
- Referee: Eddie Kelley

Scoring summary
1	9:40	NWLA	Chris Moore 21-yard Field Goal	NWLA 3–0
1	5:05	NWLA	Daniel Taylor 6-yard touchdown pass from Zach Adkins, Chris Moore kick good	NWLA 10–0
2	11:03	NWLA	Ed Eagan 8-yard touchdown pass from Zach Adkins, Chris Moore kick good	NWLA 17–0
2	8:53	NWLA	Robert Walker 26-yard touchdown run, Chris Moore kick good	NWLA 24–0
2	5:01	NWLA	Louis Hollier 31-yard touchdown pass from Zach Adkins, Chris Moore kick good	NWLA 31–0
2	1:56	SUBR	Willie Quinn 10-yard touchdown pass from Dray Joseph, Greg Pittman kick good	NWLA 31–7
3	12:59	NWLA	Rumeall Morris 3-yard touchdown run, Chris Moore kick good	NWLA 38–7
3	12:41	SUBR	Willie Quinn 98-yard kickoff return for a touchdown, Greg Pittman kick good	NWLA 38–14
3	9:45	NWLA	Robert Walker 2-yard touchdown run, Chris Moore kick good	NWLA 45–14
3	2:56	NWLA	Chris Moore kick 31-yard field goal	NWLA 48–14
4	10:04	NWLA	Matthew Morris 5-yard touchdown run, Chris Moore kick good	NWLA 55–14

=== Cincinnati ===
Northwestern State at Cincinnati

Team	1	2	3	4	Total
Demons	0	9	0	0	9
• Bearcats	14	21	10	21	66

- Date: September 14
- Location: Nippert Stadium
  Cincinnati, OH
- Game start: 7:04 PM EST
- Elapsed time: 2:59
- Game attendance: 30,384
- Game weather: 69 °F (21 °C), Sunny and clear, winds ESE at 3mph
- Referee: Todd LaPenta

Scoring summary
1	7:34	CIN	Chris Moore 10-yard touchdown pass from Brendon Kay, Tony Miliano kick good	CIN 7–0
1	2:02	CIN	Hosey Williams 4-yard touchdown run, Tony Miliano kick good	CIN 14–0
2	10:26	CIN	Mekale McKay 40-yard touchdown pass from Brendon Kay, Tony Miliano kick good	CIN 21–0
2	3:55	CIN	Tion Green 3-yard touchdown run, Tony Miliano kick good	CIN 28–0
2	2:44	NWLA	De'Mard Llorens 6-yard touchdown run, Brandon Monrose kick good	CIN 28–7
2	1:34	CIN	Anthony McClung 15-yard touchdown pass from Brendon Kay, Brandon Monrose 2-point rush failed kick good	CIN 35–6
2	0:08	NWLA	Chris Moore 47-yard Field Goal	CIN 35–9
3	10:56	CIN	Max Morrison 41-yard touchdown pass from Brendon Kay, Tony Miliano kick good	CIN 42–9
3	3:02	CIN	Tony Miliano 30-yard Field Goal	CIN 45–9
4	14:11	CIN	Hosey Williams 1-yard touchdown run, Tony Miliano kick good	CIN 52–9
4	11:02	CIN	Shakim Alonzo 44-yard touchdown pass from Bennie Coney, Tony Miliano kick good	CIN 59–9
4	2:43	CIN	Rob Rice 1-yard touchdown run, Tony Miliano kick good	NWLA 66–9

=== UAB ===
Northwestern State at UAB

Team	1	2	3	4	Total
Demons	7	7	14	0	28
• Blazers	17	14	14	7	52

- Date: September 21
- Location: Legion Field
  Birmingham, AL
- Game start: 2:00 PM CST
- Elapsed time: 2:59
- Game attendance: 8,723
- Game weather: 73 °F (23 °C), mostly cloudy w/ rain, winds NW at 10mph
- Referee: Joe Pester

Scoring summary
1	11:12	UAB	Kennard Backman 1-yard touchdown pass from Austin Brown, Ty Long kick good	UAB 7–0
1	10:09	UAB	Jamarcus Nelson 63-yard punt return for a touchdown, Ty Long kick good	UAB 14–0
1	4:11	NWLA	Gary Atzenweiler 1-yard touchdown run, Chris Moore kick good	UAB 14–7
1	1:15	UAB	Ty Long 27-yard Field Goal	UAB 17–7
2	12:08	UAB	Jamari Staples 23-yard touchdown pass from Jonathan Perry, Ty Long kick good	UAB 24–7
2	4:41	NWLA	Gary Atzenweiler 3-yard touchdown run, Chris Moore kick good	UAB 24–14
2	1:08	UAB	Darrin Reeves 8-yard touchdown run, Ty Long kick good	UAB 31–14
3	13:52	NWLA	Louis Hollier 34-yard touchdown pass from Zach Adkins, Chris Moore kick good	UAB 31–21
3	9:16	UAB	Jamarcus Nelson 41-yard touchdown pass from Austin Brown, Ty Long kick good	UAB 38–21
3	8:00	UAB	Darrin Reaves 50-yard touchdown run, Ty Long kick good	UAB 45–21
3	5:33	NWLA	Daniel Taylor 6-yard touchdown run, Chris Moore kick good	UAB 45–28
4	5:00	UAB	Jordan Howard 8-yard touchdown run, Ty Long kick good	UAB 52–28

=== Langston ===
Langston at Northwestern State

Team	1	2	3	4	Total
Lions	0	0	0	0	0
• Demons	7	14	16	0	37

- Date: September 28
- Location: Harry Turpin Stadium
  Natchitoches, LA
- Game attendance: 9,338

=== Nicholls State ===
Northwestern State at Nicholls State

Team	1	2	3	4	Total
Demons	0	0	7	14	21
• Colonels	6	21	6	0	33

- Date: October 12
- Location: John L. Guidry Stadium
  Thibodaux, LA
- Television network: SLC TV

=== Southeastern Louisiana ===
Southeastern Louisiana at Northwestern State

Team	1	2	3	4	Total
Lions	0	0	0	0	0
Demons	0	0	0	0	0

- Date: October 19
- Location: Harry Turpin Stadium
  Natchitoches, LA

=== Sam Houston State ===
Northwestern State at Sam Houston State

Team	1	2	3	4	Total
Demons	0	0	0	0	0
Bearkats	0	0	0	0	0

- Date: October 26
- Location: Bowers Stadium
  Huntsville, TX
- Television network: BSN

=== Central Arkansas ===
Central Arkansas at Northwestern State

Team	1	2	3	4	Total
Bears	0	0	0	0	0
Demons	0	0	0	0	0

- Date: November 2
- Location: Harry Turpin Stadium
  Natchitoches, LA
- Television network: ESPN3

=== Lamar ===
Lamar at Northwestern State

Team	1	2	3	4	Total
Cardinals	0	0	0	0	0
Demons	0	0	0	0	0

- Date: November 9
- Location: Harry Turpin Stadium
  Natchitoches, LA
- Television network: SLC TV

=== McNeese State ===
Northwestern State at McNeese State

Team	1	2	3	4	Total
Demons	0	0	0	0	0
Cowboys	0	0	0	0	0

- Date: November 16
- Location: Cowboy Stadium
  Lake Charles, LA
- Television network: ESPN3

=== Stephen F. Austin ===
Stephen F. Austin at Northwestern State

Team	1	2	3	4	Total
Lumberjacks	0	0	0	0	0
Demons	0	0	0	0	0

- Date: November 23
- Location: Harry Turpin Stadium
  Natchitoches, LA

== Media ==
All games aired on the radio via the Demon Sports Network, found on KNWD and online at nsudemons.com.
