= 2013 Lamar Cardinals football team =

American college football season

2013 Lamar Cardinals football
- Conference: Southland Conference
- Record: 5–7 (2–5 Southland)
- Head coach: Ray Woodard (4th season)
- Offensive coordinator: Larry Kueck (2nd season)
- Offensive scheme: Multiple
- Defensive coordinator: Bill Bradley (2nd season)
- Base defense: 3–4
- Home stadium: Provost Umphrey Stadium

2013 Southland Conference football standings
	Conf.			Overall
Team	W		L	W		L
No. 6 Southeastern Louisiana $^	7	–	0	11	–	3
No. 11 McNeese State ^	6	–	1	10	–	3
No. 14 Sam Houston State ^	4	–	3	9	–	5
Central Arkansas	4	–	3	7	–	5
Northwestern State	3	–	4	6	–	6
Lamar	2	–	5	5	–	7
Nicholls State	1	–	6	4	–	8
Stephen F. Austin	1	–	6	3	–	9
$ – Conference champion; ^ – FCS playoff participant; Rankings from The Sports Network poll

The 2013 Lamar Cardinals football team represented Lamar University in the 2013 NCAA Division I FCS football season. The Cardinals were led by fourth-year head coach Ray Woodard and played their home games at Provost Umphrey Stadium. They were a member of the Southland Conference. They finished the season 5–6, 2–4 in Southland play to finish in sixth place.

== Media ==
All Cardinals football games were broadcast on KLVI AM 560 as part of the Lamar Cardinals Radio Network. At least 3 games, including 2 road games, were broadcast on Fox 4 KBTV as the Cardinals completed the fourth year of a five-year deal granting exclusive broadcast rights to select Cardinals games to KBTV. SLC TV will cover 1 game (with a possible option for a 2nd game to end the season), CSN Houston will cover 1 game, and ESPN3 will cover 1 game in addition to the KBTV games. Cardinals SLC TV games will air locally on KUIL-LD.

== Before the season ==
=== 2013 recruits ===
Lamar signed 20 players on national letter of intent day. Recruits are listed here. Player profiles for each recruit are available at the signing day link below.

College recruiting information (2013)
Name	Hometown	School	Height	Weight	Commit date
Overall recruit ranking: Scout: Not Ranked Rivals: Not Ranked ESPN: Not Ranked
Note: In many cases, Scout, Rivals, 247Sports, On3, and ESPN may conflict in their listings of height and weight.; In these cases, the average was taken. ESPN grades are on a 100-point scale.; Sources: "2013 Player Commitments – Lamar". ESPN.; "2013 Team Ranking". Rivals.com.

=== 3rd Crawfish Bowl ===
The 3rd Annual Red-White Crayfish Bowl was held Saturday, April 16 at 7 PM. The team was divided into a red and white team, and 4 12-minute quarters were played.

2013 Crawfish Bowl

Team	1	2	3	4	OT	Total
• Red	3	0	0	3	6	12
White	0	0	3	3	0	6

- Date: April 16
- Location: Provost Umphrey Stadium
  Beaumont, TX
- Game start: 7:00 PM CST
- Elapsed time: 1:36

Scoring summary
1	2:56	Red	Alex Ball 35-yard Field Goal	Red 3–0
3	1:27	White	Justin Stout 21-yard Field Goal	3–3
4	6:43	Red	Alex Ball 47-yard Field Goal	Red 6–3
4	3:10	White	Justin Stout 39-yard Field Goal	6–6
OT	8:00	Red	Keith Wilson 80-yard Interception Return	Red 13–6

The Crawfish Bowl would need overtime to decide the winner. Just as in 2012, it was a Ryan Mossakowski pass that would determine the winner. In overtime, on 2nd and 10, a Mossakowski pass was picked off by Keith Wilson at the 20-yard line. He returned it 80-yards for the game-winning touchdown.

== Roster ==
2013 Lamar Cardinals football team roster
Players
Coaches
Offense

Pos.	#	Name	Class
QB	12	Caleb Berry	Jr
QB	5	Ryan Mossakowski	Sr
QB	17	Dillon Barrett	So

Defense

Pos.	#	Name	Class

Special teams

Pos.	#	Name	Class

Head coach

- Ray Woodard (Texas)

Coordinators/assistant coaches

- Allen Johnson (East Texas A&M)
  Asst. head coach/secondary
- Bill Bradley (Texas)
  Defensive coordinator
- Larry Kueck (Stephen F. Austin)
  Offensive coordinator
- Carey Bailey (Tennessee)
  Defensive line
- Kevin Barbay (Lamar)
  Wide receivers
- James Brown (Texas)
  Running backs
- Craig McGallion (Houston)
  Recruiting coordinator/linebackers
- Eric Hicks (Lamar)
  Graduate asst. coach/linebackers
- Jeremy Kirt (Lamar)
  Graduate asst. coach/Offense
- Brett Ramsey (Lamar)
  Director of football operations

Legend

- (C) Team captain
- (S) Suspended
- (I) Ineligible
- Injured
- Redshirt

Roster

== Schedule ==
Date	Time	Opponent	Site	TV	Result	Attendance
August 31	7:00 pm	Oklahoma Panhandle State*	Provost Umphrey Stadium; Beaumont, TX		W 75–0	8,433
September 7	6:00 pm	at Louisiana Tech*	Joe Aillet Stadium; Ruston, LA		L 14–27	16,372
September 14	6:30 pm	at No. 12 (FBS) Oklahoma State*	Boone Pickens Stadium; Stillwater, OK	FSSW	L 3–59	59,061
September 21	7:00 pm	Bacone*	Provost Umphrey Stadium; Beaumont, TX		W 53–0	8,056
September 28	6:00 pm	at Grambling State*	Eddie Robinson Stadium; Grambling, LA		W 27–16	6,497
October 12	2:00 pm	at No. 2 Sam Houston State	Bowers Stadium; Huntsville, TX	BSN	L 3–14	9,156
October 19	3:00 pm	No. 21 Central Arkansas^{†}	Provost Umphrey Stadium; Beaumont, TX	CSNH	L 24–26	10,738
October 26	7:00 pm	at Southeastern Louisiana	Strawberry Stadium; Hammond, LA	ESPN3	L 34–56	6,877
November 2	6:00 pm	Nicholls State	Provost Umphrey Stadium; Beaumont, TX		W 56–34	7,738
November 9	6:00 pm	at Northwestern State	Harry Turpin Stadium; Natchitoches, LA	SLC TV	L 28–37	3,357
November 16	6:00 pm	Stephen F. Austin	Provost Umphrey Stadium; Beaumont, TX		W 46–45	7,681
November 23	6:00 pm	No. 6 McNeese State	Provost Umphrey Stadium; Beaumont, TX (Battle of the Border)		L 38–42	7,627
*Non-conference game; ^{†}Homecoming; Rankings from The Sports Network Poll released prior to the game; All times are in Central time

== Game summaries ==
=== Oklahoma Panhandle State ===
Oklahoma Panhandle State at Lamar

Team	1	2	3	4	Total
Aggies	0	0	0	0	0
• Cardinals	28	28	9	10	75

- Date: August 31
- Location: Provost Umphrey Stadium
  Beaumont, TX
- Game start: 7:00 PM CST
- Elapsed time: 3:02
- Game attendance: 8,433
- Game weather: 87 °F (31 °C) • S 12 • Clear Skies
- Referee: Steve Baron
- TV announcers (Lamarcardinals.com): Harold Mann and Bo Brown

Scoring summary
1	12:39	Lamar	Kevin Johnson 13 yard pass from Caleb Berry (Justin Stout kick), Drive: 8 plays, 75 yards, 2:21	7–0
1	9:23	Lamar	Kade Harrington 13 yard run (Justin Stout kick), Drive: 5 plays, 36 yards, 1:05	14–0
1	9:00	Lamar	Payden McVery 21 yard pass from Caleb Berry (Justin Stout kick), Drive: 2 plays, 21 yards, 0:11	21–0
1	3:44	Lamar	Jordan Edwards 25 yard pass from Caleb Berry (Justin Stout kick), Drive: 3 plays, 44 yards, 0:57	28–0
2	7:43	Lamar	Reggie Begelton 22 yard pass from Caleb Berry (Justin Stout kick), Drive: 8 plays, 71 yards, 2:14	35–0
2	5:22	Lamar	Mark Roberts 72 yard pass from Caleb Berry (Justin Stout kick), Drive: 1 plays, 72 yards, 0:10	42–0
2	1:54	Lamar	Kade Harrington 2 yard run (Justin Stout kick), Drive: 6 plays, 63 yards, 1:37	49–0
2	1:43	Lamar	Jordan Edwards 20 yard pass from Caleb Berry (Justin Stout kick), Drive: 1 plays, 20 yards, 0:05	56–0
3	8:11	Lamar	Kevin Johnson 41 yard pass from Ryan Mossakowski (Justin Stout kick), Drive: 4 plays, 57 yards, 0:56	63–0
3	4:58	Lamar	Team safety	65–0
4	12:24	Lamar	Juan Carranco 21 yard field goal, Drive: 17 plays, 65 yards, 7:27	68–0
4	4:25	Lamar	Caleb Harmon 10 yard run (Juan Carranco kick), Drive: 6 plays, 42 yards, 3:43	75–0

=== Louisiana Tech ===
Lamar at Louisiana Tech

Team	1	2	3	4	Total
Cardinals	0	7	0	7	14
• Bulldogs	7	7	3	10	27

- Date: September 7
- Location: Joe Aillet Stadium
  Ruston, LA
- Game start: 6:07 PM CST
- Elapsed time: 3:08
- Game attendance: 16,372
- Game weather: 95 °F (35 °C)• N 5 • Mostly Sunny
- Referee: Steve LaMantia

Scoring summary
1	3:40	Louisiana Tech	Jacarri Jackson 3 yard pass from Scotty Young (Kyle Fischer kick), Drive: 12 plays, 75 yards, 4:59	0–7
2	5:23	Lamar	Payton Ploch 1 yard run (Justin Stout kick), Drive: 11 plays, 54 yards, 4:26	7–7
2	2:00	Louisiana Tech	Andrew Guillot 34 yard pass from Scotty Young (Kyle Fischer kick), Drive: 2 plays, 26 yards, 0:35	7–14
3	3:03	Louisiana Tech	Kyle Fischer 44 yard field goal, Drive: 5 plays, 72 yards, 1:31	7–17
4	10:56	Lamar	Jordan Edwards 62 yard pass from Caleb Berry (Justin Stout kick), Drive: 3 plays, 76 yards, 1:21	14–17
4	9:04	Louisiana Tech	Kyle Fischer 49 yard field goal, Drive: 7 plays, 44 yards, 1:52	14–20
4	1:51	Louisiana Tech	Andrew Guillot 19 yard touchdown run (Kyle Fischer kick), Drive: 9 plays, 65 yards, 4:15	14–27

=== Oklahoma State ===
Lamar at #12 (FBS) Oklahoma State

Team	1	2	3	4	Total
Cardinals	0	3	0	0	3
• #12 (FBS) Cowboys	21	10	21	7	59

- Date: September 14
- Location: Boone Pickens Stadium
  Stillwater, OK
- Game start: 6:35 PM CST
- Elapsed time: 3:08
- Game attendance: 59,061
- Game weather: 81 °F (27 °C)• SSE 10 • Partly cloudy
- Referee: Randy Christal
- TV announcers (FSN): Ron Thulin, Dave Lapham & Jim Knox

Scoring summary
1	9:09	Oklahoma State	Desmond Roland 2 yard touchdown run (Ben Grogan kick), Drive: 10 plays, 57 yards, 2:46	0–7
1	6:58	Oklahoma State	Jeremy Smith 4 yard run (Ben Grogan kick), Drive: 9 plays, 64 yards, 1:32	0–14
1	0:35	Oklahoma State	Jeremy Smith 1 yard run (Ben Grogan kick), Drive: 11 plays, 69 yards, 3:15	0–21
2	9:12	Oklahoma State	Ben Grogan 39 yard field goal, Drive: 8 plays, 31 yards, 1:59	0–24
2	3:34	Oklahoma State	Jeremy Smith 1 yard run (Ben Grogan kick), Drive: 3 plays, 16 yards, 0:39	0–31
2	0:00	Lamar	Justin Stout 44 yard field goal, Drive: 4 plays, 3 yards, 0:29	3–31
3	11:47	Oklahoma State	Josh Stewart 67 yard punt return (Ben Grogan kick)	3–38
3	8:23	Oklahoma State	Blake Jackson 2 yard pass from J. W. Walsh (Ben Grogan kick), Drive: 7 plays, 54 yards, 2:20	3–45
3	6:01	Oklahoma State	Clint Chelf 8 yard run (Ben Grogan kick), Drive: 3 plays, 22 yards, 1:18	3–52
4	7:34	Oklahoma State	Blake Webb 16 yard pass from Clint Chelf (Ben Grogan kick), Drive: 8 plays, 94 yards, 3:22	3–59

=== Bacone ===
Bacone at Lamar

Team	1	2	3	4	Total
Warriors	0	0	0	0	0
• Cardinals	13	23	10	7	53

- Date: September 21
- Location: Provost Umphrey Stadium
  Beaumont, TX
- Game start: 7:00 PM CST
- Elapsed time: 3:12
- Game attendance: 8,056
- Game weather: 75 °F (24 °C) • NNE 8 • Cloudy
- Referee: Ken Ray
- TV announcers (Lamarcardinals.com): Harold Mann & Bo Brown

Scoring summary
1	13:39	Lamar	Reggie Begelton 20 yard touchdown pass from Caleb Berry (Justin Stout kick failed), Drive: 6 plays, 68 yards, 1:21	6–0
1	0:58	Lamar	Mark Roberts 4 yard touchdown pass from Caleb Berry (Justin Stout kick), Drive: 9 plays, 62 yards, 2:54	13–0
2	10:55	Lamar	Reggie Begelton 2 yard touchdown pass from Caleb Berry (Justin Stout kick), Drive: 4 plays, 80 yards, 1:14	20–0
2	5:08	Lamar	Anthony Beard safety	22–0
2	4:58	Lamar	Kade Harrington 50 yard run (Justin Stout kick), Drive: 1 plays, 50 yards, 0:10	29–0
2	1:38	Lamar	Kade Harrington 17 yard pass from Caleb Berry (Justin Stout kick), Drive: 6 plays, 27 yards, 1:21	36–0
3	9:10	Lamar	Justin Stout 31 yard field goal, Drive: 4 plays, 6 yards, 1:41	39–0
3	3:40	Lamar	Ryan Mossakowski 11 yard run (Justin Stout kick), Drive: 12 plays, 64 yards, 3:45	46–0
4	3:36	Lamar	Emmitt Raleigh 12 yard run (Justin Stout kick), Drive: 5 plays, 40 yards, 2:32	53–0

=== Grambling State ===
Lamar at Grambling State

Team	1	2	3	4	Total
• Cardinals	0	10	14	3	27
Tigers	16	0	0	0	16

- Date: September 28
- Location: Eddie Robinson Stadium
  Grambling, LA
- Game start: 6:00 PM CST
- Elapsed time: 2:47
- Game attendance: 6,497
- Game weather: 84 °F (29 °C) • SE 6 • Partly sunny
- Referee: John Allmond

Scoring summary
1	9:57	Grambling State	Phillip McClain 1 yard safety	0–2
1	8:04	Grambling State	Chester Rogers 13 yard pass from D.J. Williams (Jonathan Wallace kick), Drive: 4 plays, 50 yards 1:45	0–9
1	5:04	Grambling State	Brandon Byrdsong 2 yard pass from D.J. Williams (Jonathan Wallace kick), Drive: 6 plays, 22 yards, 2:46	0–16
2	11:10	Lamar	Kevin Johnson 48 yard punt return (Justin Stout kick)	7–16
2	0:46	Lamar	Justin Stout 33 yard field goal, Drive: 10 plays, 63 yards, 3:27	10–16
3	12:09	Lamar	Reggi Begelton 32 yard pass from Caleb Berry (Justin Stout kick), Drive: 6 plays, 62 yards, 2:42	17–16
3	1:03	Lamar	Mark Roberts 17 yard pass from Caleb Berry (Justin Stout kick), Drive: 4 plays, 28 yards, 1:34	24–16
4	10:51	Lamar	Justin Stout 44 yard field goal, Drive: 8 plays, 29 yards, 1:39	27–16

=== Sam Houston State ===
Lamar at Sam Houston State

Team	1	2	3	4	Total
Cardinals	0	3	0	0	3
• #2 Bearkats	0	7	7	0	14

- Date: October 12
- Location: Bowers Stadium
  Huntsville, TX
- Game start: 2:00 PM CST
- Elapsed time: 5:18
- Game attendance: 9,156
- Referee: R. Christal
- Television network: BSN

Scoring summary
2	9:57	Sam Houston State	Brian Bell 45 yard run (Luc Swimberghe kick), Drive: 6 plays, 77 yards, 2:40	0–7
2	8:04	Lamar	Alex Ball 47 yard field goal, Drive: 14 plays, 69 yards, 3:12	3–7
3	10:51	Sam Houston State	Steph Williams 18 yard pass from Brian Bell (Luc Swimberghe kick) Drive: 5 plays, 56 yards, 2:19	3–14

=== Central Arkansas ===
Central Arkansas at Lamar

Team	1	2	3	4	Total
• #21 Bears	0	3	14	9	26
Cardinals	0	10	7	7	24

- Date: October 19
- Location: Provost Umphrey Stadium
  Beaumont, TX
- Game start: 6:00 PM CST
- Elapsed time: 3:14
- Game attendance: 10,738
- Game weather: 61 °F (16 °C) • 4 mph • Clear skies
- Referee: Brian Alos
- Television network: CSNH

Scoring summary
2	14:41	Lamar	Alex Ball 42 yard field goal, Drive: 4 plays, -14 yards, 0:35	3–0
2	3:07	Central Arkansas	Eddie Camara 35 yard field goal, Drive: 17 plays, 69 yards, 6:34	3–3
2	1:27	Lamar	Reggi Begelton 10 yard pass from Caleb Berry (Alex Ball kick), Drive: 6 plays, 79 yards, 1:34	10–3
3	12:31	Central Arkansas	Chase Dixon 19 yard pass from Ryan Howard (Eddie Camara kick), Drive: 6 plays, 61 yards, 2:24	10–10
3	7:10	Lamar	Payton Ploch 9 yard pass from Caleb Berry (Alex Ball kick), Drive: 4 plays, 42 yards, 1:05	17–10
3	3:22	Central Arkansas	Thomas Hart 3 yard pass from Ryan Howard (Eddie Camara kick), Drive: 14 plays, 69 yards, 3:12	17–17
4	12:04	Central Arkansas	Eddie Camara 31 yard field goal, Drive: 14 plays, 69 yards, 3:12	17–20
4	6:34	Lamar	Reggi Begelton 5 yard pass from Berry, Caleb (Ball, Alex kick), Drive: 16 plays, 90 yards, 5:25	24–20
4	2:53	Central Arkansas	Cour Whitehead 23 yard pass from Ryan Howard (Eddie Camara kick blocked), Drive: 12 plays, 75 yards, 3:41	24–26

=== Southeastern Louisiana ===
Lamar at Southeastern Louisiana

Team	1	2	3	4	Total
Cardinals	14	0	7	13	34
• Lions	7	21	14	14	56

- Date: October 26
- Location: Strawberry Stadium
  Hammond, LA
- Game start: 7:00 PM CST
- Elapsed time: 3:20
- Game attendance: 6,877
- Game weather: 67 °F (19 °C) • Calm • Clear
- Referee: Julian Alvarez
- Television network: ESPN3

Scoring summary
1	–
2	–
3	–
4	–

=== Nicholls State ===
Nicholls State at Lamar

Team	1	2	3	4	Total
Colonels	0	0	0	0	0
Cardinals	0	0	0	0	0

- Date: November 2
- Location: Provost Umphrey Stadium
  Beaumont, TX

=== Northwestern State ===
Lamar at Northwestern State

Team	1	2	3	4	Total
Cardinals	0	0	0	0	0
Demons	0	0	0	0	0

- Date: November 9
- Location: Harry Turpin Stadium
  Natchitoches, LA
- Television network: SLC TV

=== Stephen F. Austin ===
Stephen F. Austin at Lamar

Team	1	2	3	4	Total
Lumberjacks	0	0	0	0	0
Cardinals	0	0	0	0	0

- Date: November 16
- Location: Provost Umphrey Stadium
  Beaumont, TX

=== McNeese State ===
McNeese State at Lamar

Team	1	2	3	4	Total
Cowboys	0	0	0	0	0
Cardinals	0	0	0	0	0

- Date: November 23
- Location: Provost Umphrey Stadium
  Beaumont, TX

== Ranking movements ==
Ranking movements Legend: — = Not ranked
	Week														
Poll	Pre	1	2	3	4	5	6	7	8	9	10	11	12	13	Final
Sports Network	—	—	—	—	—	—	—	—	—	—	—	—	—	—	—
Coaches	—	—	—	—	—	—	—	—	—	—	—	—	—	—	—
