= 2013 Central Arkansas Bears football team =

American college football season

2013 Central Arkansas Bears football
- Conference: Southland Conference
- Record: 7–5 (4–3 Southland)
- Head coach: Clint Conque (14th season)
- Offensive coordinator: Brooks Hollingsworth (10th season)
- Defensive coordinator: Matt Williamson (4th season)
- Home stadium: Estes Stadium

2013 Southland Conference football standings
	Conf.			Overall
Team	W		L	W		L
No. 6 Southeastern Louisiana $^	7	–	0	11	–	3
No. 11 McNeese State ^	6	–	1	10	–	3
No. 14 Sam Houston State ^	4	–	3	9	–	5
Central Arkansas	4	–	3	7	–	5
Northwestern State	3	–	4	6	–	6
Lamar	2	–	5	5	–	7
Nicholls State	1	–	6	4	–	8
Stephen F. Austin	1	–	6	3	–	9
$ – Conference champion; ^ – FCS playoff participant; Rankings from The Sports Network poll

The 2013 Central Arkansas Bears football team represented the University of Central Arkansas in the 2013 NCAA Division I FCS football season. The Bears were led by 14th-year head coach Clint Conque and played their home games at Estes Stadium. They were a member of the Southland Conference.

== Schedule ==
Date	Time	Opponent	Rank	Site	TV	Result	Attendance
August 29	7:00 pm	Incarnate Word*	No. 7	Estes Stadium; Conway, AR		W 58–7	10,455
September 7	7:00 pm	at Colorado*	No. 7	Folsom Field; Boulder, CO	P12N	L 24–38	35,168
September 14	6:00 pm	at UT Martin*	No. 8	Graham Stadium; Martin, TN		L 23–24	5,061
September 21	7:00 pm	at Missouri State*	No. 13	Plaster Sports Complex; Springfield, MO		W 17–13	8,963
October 5	3:00 pm	No. 11 McNeese State	No. 14	Estes Stadium; Conway, AR (Red Beans and Rice Bowl)	SLCTV	L 28–59	10,247
October 12	4:00 pm	Nebraska–Kearney*	No. 20	Estes Stadium; Conway, AR		W 31–0	8,243
October 19	6:00 pm	at Lamar	No. 21	Provost Umphrey Stadium; Beaumont, TX	CSNH	W 26–24	10,738
October 26	3:00 pm	Stephen F. Austin^{†}	No. 23	Estes Stadium; Conway, AR	SLCTV	W 66–31	10,827
November 2	7:00 pm	at Northwestern State	No. 18	Harry Turpin Stadium; Natchitoches, LA	ESPN3	L 28–31	5,872
November 9	7:00 pm	No. 16 Southeastern Louisiana		Estes Stadium; Conway, AR	ESPN3	L 31–58	5,427
November 16	3:00 pm	at Nicholls State		John L. Guidry Stadium; Thibodaux, LA		W 17–10	5,119
November 23	3:00 pm	No. 9 Sam Houston State		Estes Stadium; Conway, AR		W 49–31	4,227
*Non-conference game; ^{†}Homecoming; Rankings from The Sports Network Poll released prior to the game; All times are in Central time

== Game summaries ==
=== Incarnate Word ===
Incarnate Word at Central Arkansas

Team	1	2	3	4	Total
Cardinals	0	0	0	7	7
• #7 Bears	16	14	14	14	58

- Date: August 29
- Location: Estes Stadium
  Conway, AR
- Game start: 7:00 PM CST
- Elapsed time: 3:05
- Game attendance: 10,455
- Game weather: 97 °F (36 °C) • Clear
- Referee: Ken Ray
- TV announcers (UCA Gameday): Steve Sullivan, Justin Acri, and Monty Powell
Sources:Box Score

Scoring summary
1	10:18	Incarnate Word	Blake Veasley 11 yard run (Eddie Camara kick failed), Drive: 10 plays, 70 yards, 4:42	6–0
1	7:21	Central Arkansas	Blake Veasley 18 yard run (Eddie Camra kick), Drive: 6 plays, 59 yards, 2:30	13–0
1	1:39	Central Arkansas	Eddie Camara 42 yard field goal, Drive: 9 plays, 34 yards, 2:59	16–0
2	7:36	Central Arkansas	Jatavio Wilson 29 yard pass from Wynri Smothers (Eddie Camara kick), Drive: 9 plays, 77 yards, 4:13	23–0
2	2:36	Central Arkansas	Danze Williams 1 yard run (Eddie Camara kick), Drive: 9 plays, 72 yards, 3:54	30–0
3	12:59	Central Arkansas	Desmond Smith recovers blocked punt in end zone (Eddie Camara kick), Drive: 3 plays 2 yards, 1:56	37–0
3	0:09	Central Arkansas	Danze Williams 3 yard run (Eddie Camara kick), Drive: 11 plays, 80 yards, 4:45	44–0
4	6:02	Central Arkansas	Jatavio Wilson 36 yard pass from Taylor Reed (Eddie Camara kick), Drive: 5 plays, 50 yards, 2:12	51–0
4	4:00	Incarnate Word	Trent Brittain 38 yard run (Jake Wilcox kick), Drive: 6 plays, 68 yards, 1:55	51–7
4	3:44	Central Arkansas	Jatavio Wilson 93 yard kickoff return (Eddie Camara kick), Drive: 0 plays 93 yards, 0:00	58–7

=== Colorado ===
Central Arkansas at Colorado

Team	1	2	3	4	Total
#7 Bears	0	14	3	7	24
• Buffaloes	7	7	3	21	38

- Date: September 7
- Location: Folsom Field
  Boulder, CO
- Game start: 6:07 PM MST
- Elapsed time: 3:25
- Game attendance: 35,168
- Game weather: 90 °F (32 °C) • N 9 • Partly cloudy, 18% humidity
- Referee: Jay Stricherz
- TV announcers (Pac-12 Mtn.): Kevin Calabro, Yogi Roth & Jill Savage
Sources:Box Score

Scoring summary
1	4:58	Colorado	Paul Richardson 55 yard pass from Connor Wood (Will Oliver kick), Drive: 2 plays, 57 yards, 0:33	0–7
2	11:55	Colorado	Greg Henderson 46 yard interception return (Will Oliver kick), Drive: 3 plays 6 yards, 1:20	0–14
2	4:37	Central Arkansas	Dezmin Lewis 23 yard pass from Wynri Smothers (Jace Denker kick), Drive: 6 plays 69 yards, 2:54	7–14
2	0:22	Central Arkansas	Chase Dixon 11 yard run (Jace Denker kick), Drive: 10 plays 76 yards, 2:34	14–14
3	13:54	Central Arkansas	Jace Denker 28 yard field goal, Drive: 4 plays 1 yard, 0:54	17–14
3	11:28	Colorado	Will Oliver 31 yard field goal, Drive: 7 plays 55 yards, 2:19	17–17
4	14:56	Central Arkansas	Wynri Smothers 1 yard touchdown run (Jace Denker kick), Drive: 7 plays 21 yards, 2:44	24–17
4	10:43	Colorado	Jered Bell 79 yard interception return (Will Oliver kick), Drive: 7 plays 32 yards, 2:54	24–24
4	9:16	Colorado	Paul Richardson 30 yard pass from Connor Wood (Will Oliver kick), Drive: 2 plays 30 yards, 0:37	24–31
4	4:24	Colorado	Nelson Spruce 39 yard pass from Connor Wood (Will Oliver kick), Drive: 10 plays 73 yards, 3:17	24–38

=== UT Martin ===
Central Arkansas at UT Martin

Team	1	2	3	4	Total
#8 Bears	0	0	7	16	23
• Skyhawks	7	7	3	7	24

- Date: September 14
- Location: Graham Stadium
  Martin, TN
- Game start: 6:00 PM CST
- Elapsed time: 3:19
- Game attendance: 5,061
- Game weather: 70 °F (21 °C) • NE 6 • Clear
- Referee: Jeremy Parker

Scoring summary
1	10:53	Tennessee–Martin	Dylan Davis 5 yard touchdown pass from Dylan Favre (Jackson Redditt kick), Drive: 10 plays 70 yards, 4:07	0–7
2	5:48	Tennessee–Martin	DJ McNeil 31 yard pass from Dylan Favre (Jackson Redditt kick), Drive: 9 plays 75 yards, 3:56	0–14
3	13:20	Central Arkansas	Willie Matthews 1 yard touchdown run (Jace Denker kick), Drive: 4 plays 55 yards, 1:40	7–14
3	3:31	Tennessee–Martin	Jackson Redditt 22 yard field goal, Drive: 7 plays 46 yards, 2:09	7–17
4	10:10	Central Arkansas	Chase Dixon 12 yard pass from Wynri Smothers (Jace Denker kick), Drive: 1 play 12 yards, 0:06	14–17
4	6:53	Tennessee–Martin	Jeremy Butler 24 yard pass from Dylan Favre (Jackson Redditt kick), Drive: 9 plays 68 yards, 3:11	14–24
4	5:33	Central Arkansas	Damien Watts 42 yard pass from Wynri Smothers (Jace Denker kick), Drive: 5 plays 52 yards, 1:11	21–24
4	0:35	Central Arkansas	Team Safety, Drive: 4 plays -4 yards, 1:03	23–24

=== Missouri State ===
Central Arkansas at Missouri State

Team	1	2	3	4	Total
• #13 Bears (UCA)	3	14	0	0	17
Bears (MSU)	7	7	0	0	14

- Date: September 21
- Location: Plaster Sports Complex
  Springfield, MO
- Game start: 6:05 PM CST
- Elapsed time: 2:59
- Game attendance: 8,963
- Game weather: 71 °F (22 °C) • N 12 • Sunny
- Referee: Tim O'Dey

Scoring summary
1	6:48	Missouri State	Dorian Buford 8 yard pass from Kierra Harris (Austin Witmer kick failed), Drive: 10 plays 66 yards, 3:24	0–6
1	6:05	Central Arkansas	Dezmin Lewis 75 yard pass from Wynri Smothers (Jace Denker kick), Drive: 2 plays 75 yards, 0:43	7–6
2	12:53	Central Arkansas	Jace Denker 27 yard field goal, Drive: 4 plays 9 yards, 1:57	10–6
2	9:18	Missouri State	Vernon Scott 3 yard run (Austin Witmer kick), Drive: 9 plays 71 yards, 3:28	10–13
2	2:30	Central Arkansas	Chase Dixon 8 yard pass from Wynri Smothers (Jace Denker kick), Drive: 8 plays 48 yards, 3:25	17–13

=== McNeese State ===
McNeese State at Central Arkansas

Team	1	2	3	4	Total
• #11 Cowboys	7	35	7	10	59
#14 Bears	7	14	7	0	28

- Date: October 5
- Location: Estes Stadium
  Conway, AR
- Television network: SLC TV

=== Nebraska–Kearney ===
Nebraska–Kearney at Central Arkansas

Team	1	2	3	4	Total
Lopers	0	0	0	0	0
• #20 Bears	10	0	14	7	31

- Date: October 12
- Location: Estes Stadium
  Conway, AR
- TV announcers (UCA Gameday): Steve Sullivan, Justin Acri, and Monty Powell

=== Lamar ===
Central Arkansas at Lamar

Team	1	2	3	4	Total
#21 Bears	0	0	0	0	0
Cardinals	0	0	0	0	0

- Date: October 19
- Location: Provost Umphrey Stadium
  Beaumont, TX
- Television network: CSNH

=== Stephen F. Austin ===
Stephen F. Austin at Central Arkansas

Team	1	2	3	4	Total
Lumberjacks	0	0	0	0	0
Bears	0	0	0	0	0

- Date: October 26
- Location: Estes Stadium
  Conway, AR
- Television network: SLC TV

=== Northwestern State ===
Central Arkansas at Northwestern State

Team	1	2	3	4	Total
Bears	0	0	0	0	0
Demons	0	0	0	0	0

- Date: November 2
- Location: Harry Turpin Stadium
  Natchitoches, LA
- Television network: ESPN3

=== Southeastern Louisiana ===
Southeastern Louisiana at Central Arkansas

Team	1	2	3	4	Total
Lions	0	0	0	0	0
Bears	0	0	0	0	0

- Date: November 9
- Location: Estes Stadium
  Conway, AR
- Television network: ESPN3

=== Nicholls State ===
Central Arkansas at Nicholls State

Team	1	2	3	4	Total
Bears	0	0	0	0	0
Colonels	0	0	0	0	0

- Date: November 16
- Location: John L. Guidry Stadium
  Thibodaux, LA

=== Sam Houston State ===
Sam Houston State at Central Arkansas

Team	1	2	3	4	Total
Bearkats	0	0	0	0	0
Bears	0	0	0	0	0

- Date: November 23
- Location: Estes Stadium
  Conway, AR

== Ranking movements ==
Ranking movements Legend: ██ Increase in ranking ██ Decrease in ranking RV = Received votes т = Tied with team above or below
	Week														
Poll	Pre	1	2	3	4	5	6	7	8	9	10	11	12	13	Final
Sports Network	7	7	8	13	13	14	20	21	23	18	RV	RV	RV	RV	RV
Coaches	6	5	7	14	13	11	20	20	20	15	24–T	RV	RV	RV	RV

== Media ==
All Central Arkansas were aired on KHLR 106.7 FM and streamed online through the station's website.
