= 2013 Stephen F. Austin Lumberjacks football team =

American college football season

2013 Stephen F. Austin Lumberjacks football
- Conference: Southland Conference
- Record: 3–9 (1–6 Southland)
- Head coach: J. C. Harper (7th season)
- Offensive coordinator: Chris Traux (1st season)
- Defensive coordinator: David Gibbs (6th season)
- Home stadium: Homer Bryce Stadium

2013 Southland Conference football standings
	Conf.			Overall
Team	W		L	W		L
No. 6 Southeastern Louisiana $^	7	–	0	11	–	3
No. 11 McNeese State ^	6	–	1	10	–	3
No. 14 Sam Houston State ^	4	–	3	9	–	5
Central Arkansas	4	–	3	7	–	5
Northwestern State	3	–	4	6	–	6
Lamar	2	–	5	5	–	7
Nicholls State	1	–	6	4	–	8
Stephen F. Austin	1	–	6	3	–	9
$ – Conference champion; ^ – FCS playoff participant; Rankings from The Sports Network poll

The 2013 Stephen F. Austin Lumberjacks football team represented Stephen F. Austin State University in the 2013 NCAA Division I FCS football season. The Lumberjacks were led by seventh-year head coach J. C. Harper and played their home games at Homer Bryce Stadium. They were a member of the Southland Conference. They finished the season 3–9, 1–6 in Southland play to finish in a tie for seventh place.

== Before the season ==
=== Coaching changes ===
On February 4, J. C. Harper announced his coaching staff would be altered for the 2013 season. Chris Traux was promoted to offensive coordinator after serving on the offensive side of the ball for seven seasons. Lance Guidry was brought in from Western Kentucky to become the new secondary coach. Arlington Nunn changed coaching positions to become the new running backs coach, Jeremy Moses became the quarterbacks coach, and Devin Ducote became the defensive backs coach.

=== 2013 recruits ===
23 athletes signed on to join Stephen F. Austin for the 2013 football season.

College recruiting information (2013)
Name	Hometown	School	Height	Weight	Commit date
Colton Bretton; QB	Glen Rose, TX	Glen Rose	6 ft 4 in (1.93 m)	190 lb (86 kg)	Feb 6, 2013
Colton Bretton; QB	Recruit ratings: ESPN:				
Patrick Brown; DB	Henderson, TX	Henderson	5 ft 11 in (1.80 m)	170 lb (77 kg)	Feb 4, 2013
Patrick Brown; DB	Recruit ratings: Rivals: ESPN:				
Aaron Doddy; QB	Hooks, TX	Hooks	6 ft 4 in (1.93 m)	190 lb (86 kg)	Feb 4, 2013
Aaron Doddy; QB	Recruit ratings: Rivals: ESPN:				
Juvon Gales; DL	Hahnville, LA	Hahnville	6 ft 3 in (1.91 m)	280 lb (130 kg)	Dec 19, 2012
Juvon Gales; DL	Recruit ratings: Rivals: ESPN:				
Hunter Harwell; LB	Mesquite, TX	Horn	6 ft 2 in (1.88 m)	205 lb (93 kg)	Feb 4, 2013
Hunter Harwell; LB	Recruit ratings: ESPN:				
Justice Liggins; WR	Tyler, TX	John Tyler	6 ft 1 in (1.85 m)	195 lb (88 kg)	Jan 21, 2013
Justice Liggins; WR	Recruit ratings: Rivals: ESPN:				
Trey McGahan; LB	Kennedale, TX	Kennedale	6 ft 2 in (1.88 m)	195 lb (88 kg)	Feb 4, 2013
Trey McGahan; LB	Recruit ratings: ESPN:				
Andrew McNew; OL	Waco, TX	Robinson	6 ft 4 in (1.93 m)	285 lb (129 kg)	Feb 4, 2013
Andrew McNew; OL	Recruit ratings: ESPN:				
Roman Mitchell; LB	Lake Dallas, TX	Lake Dallas	5 ft 11 in (1.80 m)	200 lb (91 kg)	Feb 4, 2013
Roman Mitchell; LB	Recruit ratings: ESPN:				
Anthony Pullins; OL	Cedar Hill, TX	Cedar Hill	6 ft 1 in (1.85 m)	290 lb (130 kg)	Feb 4, 2013
Anthony Pullins; OL	Recruit ratings: ESPN:				
Brett Rattan; K	Mesquite, TX	Poteet	6 ft 1 in (1.85 m)	215 lb (98 kg)	Feb 4, 2013
Brett Rattan; K	Recruit ratings: ESPN:				
Justin Reasons; OL	Groves, TX	Port Neches–Groves	6 ft 3 in (1.91 m)	280 lb (130 kg)	Feb 4, 2013
Justin Reasons; OL	Recruit ratings: ESPN:				
Shane Roberson; DT	Little Elm, TX	Frisco	6 ft 2 in (1.88 m)	285 lb (129 kg)	Feb 4, 2013
Shane Roberson; DT	Recruit ratings: ESPN:				
De'Quann Ruffin; WR	Humble, TX	Summer Creek	6 ft 2 in (1.88 m)	185 lb (84 kg)	Feb 4, 2013
De'Quann Ruffin; WR	Recruit ratings: ESPN:				
Dru Smith; QB	Sherman, TX	Sherman	6 ft 1 in (1.85 m)	195 lb (88 kg)	Feb 4, 2013
Dru Smith; QB	Recruit ratings: ESPN:				
Robert Sylvester; WR	Houston, TX	Cypress Lakes	6 ft 0 in (1.83 m)	176 lb (80 kg)	Feb 4, 2013
Robert Sylvester; WR	Recruit ratings: ESPN:				
Rodney Timmons; DT	Irving, TX	Irving	6 ft 0 in (1.83 m)	295 lb (134 kg)	Feb 4, 2013
Rodney Timmons; DT	Recruit ratings: ESPN:				
Brian Walker; WR	Sulphur, LA	Sulphur	5 ft 10 in (1.78 m)	170 lb (77 kg)	Feb 4, 2013
Brian Walker; WR	Recruit ratings: ESPN:				
Jalend Washom; OL	Houston, TX	Eisenhower	6 ft 4 in (1.93 m)	280 lb (130 kg)	Feb 4, 2013
Jalend Washom; OL	Recruit ratings: ESPN:				
Joshawa West; WR	Angleton, TX	Angleton	5 ft 10 in (1.78 m)	170 lb (77 kg)	Feb 4, 2013
Joshawa West; WR	Recruit ratings: ESPN:				
Eugene Wright; RB	Rosenberg, TX	B. F. Terry	5 ft 9 in (1.75 m)	165 lb (75 kg)	Feb 4, 2013
Eugene Wright; RB	Recruit ratings: ESPN:				
Mitchell Zimmerle; DE	Danbury, TX	Danbury	6 ft 3 in (1.91 m)	210 lb (95 kg)	Feb 4, 2013
Mitchell Zimmerle; DE	Recruit ratings: ESPN:				
Vedial Johnson; LB	Sugarland, TX	Kempner; Trinity Valley CC	6 ft 2 in (1.88 m)	225 lb (102 kg)	Feb 4, 2013
Vedial Johnson; LB	Recruit ratings: ESPN:				
Overall recruit ranking: Scout: Not Ranked Rivals: Not Ranked ESPN: Not Ranked
Note: In many cases, Scout, Rivals, 247Sports, On3, and ESPN may conflict in their listings of height and weight.; In these cases, the average was taken. ESPN grades are on a 100-point scale.; Sources: "2013 Player Commitments – Stephen F. Austin Lumberjacks". ESPN.; "2013 Team Ranking". Rivals.com.

== Schedule ==
Date	Time	Opponent	Site	TV	Result	Attendance
August 31	7:00 pm	at Weber State*	Stewart Stadium; Ogden, UT	Big Sky TV	L 40–50	6,181
September 7	6:00 pm	at Texas Tech*	Jones AT&T Stadium; Lubbock, TX	FSSW+	L 13–61	54,086
September 14	6:00 pm	McMurry*	Homer Bryce Stadium; Nacogdoches, TX	Lumberjack TV	W 50–13	8,254
September 21	6:00 pm	No. 3 Montana State*	Homer Bryce Stadium; Nacogdoches, TX	KCEB	W 52–38	9,433
September 28	6:00 pm	Prairie View A&M*	Homer Bryce Stadium; Nacogdoches, TX	Lumberjack TV	L 48–56	12,329
October 12	7:00 pm	at Southeastern Louisiana	Strawberry Stadium; Hammond, LA	ESPN3	L 14–56	5,080
October 19	3:00 pm	Nicholls State	Homer Bryce Stadium; Nacogdoches, TX	SLCTV	W 55–41	12,090
October 26	3:00 pm	at No. 23 Central Arkansas	Estes Stadium; Conway, AR	SLCTV	L 31–66	10,827
November 2	3:00 pm	vs. No. 8 Sam Houston State	Reliant Stadium; Houston, TX (Battle of the Piney Woods)	SLCTV	L 49–56	26,213
November 9	3:00 pm	No. 11 McNeese State	Homer Bryce Stadium; Nacogdoches, TX	Lumberjack TV	L 38–69	6,312
November 16	6:00 pm	at Lamar	Provost Umphrey Stadium; Beaumont, TX		L 45–46	7,681
November 23	3:00 pm	at Northwestern State	Harry Turpin Stadium; Natchitoches, LA (Chief Caddo)		L 27–40	3,117
*Non-conference game; Rankings from The Sports Network Poll released prior to the game; All times are in Central time

== Game summaries ==
=== At Weber State ===
Stephen F. Austin at Weber State

Team	1	2	3	4	Total
Lumberjacks	7	3	17	13	40
• Wildcats	23	0	20	7	50

- Date: August 31
- Location: Stewart Stadium
  Ogden, UT
- Game start: 6:05 PM MST
- Elapsed time: 3:30
- Game attendance: 6,181
- Game weather: 89 °F (32 °C), Sunny, winds calm
- Referee: Jim Crowley
- TV announcers (Big Sky TV): Carl Arky and Ty Sparrow

Scoring summary
1	13:21	Weber State	Erik Walker 39-yard touchdown run (Jordan Adamcyzk pass to Cordero Dixon for a two-point conv.)	0–8
1	9:35	Weber State	DJ Walker 70-yard interception returned for a touchdown (Kela Marciel rush for a two-point conv.)	0–16
1	5:17	Stephen F Austin	DJ Ward 36-yard touchdown pass from Brady Attaway (Fred Ford kick good)	7–16
1	5:03	Weber State	Bo Bolen 100-yard kickoff return for a touchdown (Carson Fackrell kick good)	7–23
2	0:18	Stephen F Austin	Jordan Wiggins 22-yard field goal	10–23
3	14:35	Stephen F Austin	Mike Brooks 14-yard touchdown pass from Brady Attaway (Jordan Wiggs kick good)	17–23
3	13:11	Weber State	Erik Walker 27-yard touchdown pass from Jordan Adamczyk (Carson Fackrell kick good)	17–30
3	11:37	Stephen F Austin	Aaron Thomas 34-yard touchdown pass from Brady Attaway (Jordan Wiggs kick good)	24–30
3	8:19	Weber State	Bo Bolen 1-yard touchdown rush (two-point conv. failed)	24–36
3	5:19	Stephen F Austin	Jordan Wiggs 40-yard field goal	27–36
3	0:52	Weber State	Bo Bolen 19-yard touchdown rush (Carson Fackrell kick good)	27–43
4	13:53	Stephen F Austin	Mike Brooks 21-yard touchdown pass from Brady Attaway (Jordan Wiggs kick good)	34–43
4	11:42	Stephen F Austin	Gus Johnson 2-yard touchdown rush (Jordan Wiggs PAT failed)	40–43
4	10:25	Weber State	Zach Smith 57-yard touchdown run (Carson Fackrell kick good)	40–50

=== At Texas Tech ===
Stephen F. Austin at Texas Tech

Team	1	2	3	4	Total
Lumberjacks	7	0	0	6	13
• Red Raiders	28	17	16	0	61

- Date: September 7
- Location: Jones AT&T Stadium
  Lubbock, TX
- Game start: 6:50 PM CST
- Elapsed time: 3:48
- Game attendance: 54,086
- Game weather: 88 °F (31 °C), Mostly Cloudy, winds SE 19mph
- Referee: Greg Burks
- TV announcers (FSN): Brendan Burke, JC Pearson & Lesley McCaslin

Scoring summary
1	14:08	Texas Tech	Jakeem Grant 42-yard touchdown pass from Baker Mayfield, Ryan Bustin kick good	0–7
1	9:08	Texas Tech	Kenny Williams 1-yard touchdown run (Ryan Bustin kick good)	0–14
1	8:55	Stephen F Austin	Mike Brooks 75-yard touchdown pass from Tyler Bond (Jordan Wiggins kick good)	7–14
1	4:27	Texas Tech	Jace Amaro 25-yard touchdown pass from Baker Mayfield (Ryan Bustin kick good)	7–21
1	3:44	Texas Tech	Kenny Williams 18-yard touchdown run (Ryan Bustin kick good)	7–28
2	8:14	Texas Tech	Bradley Marquez 60-yard touchdown pass from Baker Mayfield (Ryan Bustin kick good)	7–35
2	6:00	Texas Tech	Ryan Bustin 28-yard field goal	7–38
2	0:27	Texas Tech	De'Andre Washington 2-yard touchdown run (Ryan Bustin kick good)	7–45
3	8:27	Texas Tech	Team Safety	7–47
3	8:08	Texas Tech	Quinton White 5-yard touchdown run (Ryan Bustin kick good)	7–54
3	2:05	Texas Tech	Reginald Davis 23-yard touchdown pass from Davis Webb (Ryan Bustin kick good)	7–61
4	7:30	Stephen F Austin	Marquis Mosley 36-yard touchdown pass from Joe Minden (two-point conv. failed)	13–61

=== McMurry ===
McMurry at Stephen F. Austin

Team	1	2	3	4	Total
War Hawks	6	7	0	0	13
• Lumberjacks	10	24	2	14	50

- Date: September 14
- Location: Homer Bryce Stadium
  Nacogdoches, TX
- Game start: 6:00 PM CST
- Elapsed time: 3:23
- Game attendance: 8,254
- Referee: Kevin Hassell

Scoring summary
1	13:35	Stephen F Austin	Jordan Wiggs 30-yard field goal	3–0
1	4:26	Stephen F Austin	Gus Johnson 1-yard touchdown run (Jordan Wiggs kick good)	10–0
1	0:20	McMurry	Chris Simpson 1-yard touchdown run (two-point conv. failed)	10–7
2	14:13	McMurry	Chris Simpson 3-yard touchdown run (Ian McCarthy kick good)	10–13
2	5:15	Stephen F Austin	DJ Ward 5-yard touchdown pass from Brady Attaway (Jordan Wiggs kick good)	17–13
2	3:29	Stephen F Austin	Gus Johnson 12-yard touchdown run (Jordan Wiggs kick good)	24–13
2	1:20	Stephen F Austin	Jordan Wiggs 21-yard field goal	27–13
2	0:00	Stephen F Austin	Tyler Boyd 3-yard touchdown pass from Brady Attaway (Jordan Wiggs kick good)	34–13
3	5:12	Stephen F Austin	Brady Lambert sacked for a safety	36–13
4	12:54	Stephen F Austin	Keith Lawson 2-yard touchdown run (Jordan Wiggs kick good)	43–13
4	10:19	Stephen F Austin	Fred Ford 1-yard touchdown run (Jordan Wiggs kick good)	50–13

=== No. 3 Montana State ===
Montana State at Stephen F. Austin

Team	1	2	3	4	Total
No. 3 Bobcats	9	15	6	8	38
• Lumberjacks	17	14	0	21	52

- Date: September 21
- Location: Homer Bryce Stadium
  Nacogdoches, TX
- Game start: 6:00 PM CST
- Elapsed time: 3:40
- Game attendance: 9,433
- Game weather: 77 °F (25 °C) • Sunny
- Referee: Randy Christal
- TV announcers (KCEB): Chris Byers, Mike Callaghan & Jeff Eberle

Scoring summary
1	11:40	Stephen F Austin	Jordan Wiggs 24-yard field goal	3–0
1	7:35	Montana State	Rory Perez 37-yard field goal	3–3
1	4:11	Stephen F Austin	Mike Brooks 2-yard touchdown pass from Brady Attaway (Jordan Wiggs kick good)	10–3
1	2:52	Stephen F Austin	Gus Johnson 23-yard touchdown run (Jordan Wiggs kick good)	17–3
1	0:35	Montana State	Jon Ellis 42-yard touchdown pass from Jake Bleskin (Rory Perez kick failed)	17–9
2	11:29	Stephen F Austin	DJ Ward 2-yard touchdown pass from Brady Attaway (Jordan Wiggs kick good)	24–9
2	7:15	Montana State	Tanner Bleskin 6-yard touchdown pass from Jake Bleskin (Mitch Griebel two-point conv. run)	24–17
2	4:35	Stephen F Austin	Gus Johnson 1-yard touchdown run (Jordan Wiggs kick good)	31–17
2	1:51	Montana State	Jake Bleskin 19-yard touchdown run (Rory Perez kick good)	31–24
3	1:59	Montana State	Jon Ellis 10-yard touchdown rush (Mitch Griebel two-point conv. run failed)	31–30
4	11:34	Montana State	Cody Kirk 2-yard touchdown run (Cody Kirk two-point conv. pass from Jake Bleskin)	31–38
4	8:45	Stephen F Austin	Joshawa West 13-yard touchdown run (Jordan Wiggs kick good)	38–38
4	5:01	Stephen F Austin	Gus Johnson 5-yard touchdown run (Jordan Wiggs kick good)	45–38
4	0:26	Stephen F Austin	Oratavious Hypolite 25-yard interception return for a touchdown (Jordan Wiggs kick good)	52–38

=== Prairie View A&M ===
Prairie View A&M at Stephen F. Austin

Team	1	2	3	4	Total
• Panthers	21	14	14	7	56
Lumberjacks	14	17	3	14	48

- Date: September 21
- Location: Homer Bryce Stadium
  Nacogdoches, TX
- Game start: 6:00 PM CST
- Elapsed time: 3:24
- Game attendance: 12,329
- Game weather: 81 °F (27 °C) • Overcast
- Referee: Reggie Smith

Scoring summary
1	13:34	Stephen F Austin	Gus Johnson 1-yard touchdown run (Jordan Wiggs kick good)	7–0
1	10:53	Stephen F Austin	Joshawa West 1-yard touchdown run (Jordan Wiggs kick good)	14–0
1	8:44	Prairie View A&M	Gabe Dunlap 13-yard touchdown pass from Jerry Lovelock (Christopher Barrick kick good)	14–7
1	3:42	Prairie View A&M	Patrick Gant 3-yard touchdown pass from Jerry Lovelock, Christopher Barrick kick good	14–14
1	0:07	Prairie View A&M	Jerry Lovelock 4-yard touchdown run, Christopher Barrick kick good	14–21
2	11:06	Prairie View A&M	Deandre Cooper 39-yard touchdown pass from Jerry Lovelock (Christopher Barrick kick good)	14–28
2	5:32	Stephen F Austin	Marquis Mosley 7-yard touchdown pass from Brady Attaway (Jordan Wiggs kick good)	21–28
2	2:50	Stephen F Austin	Jordan Wiggs 28-yard field goal	24–28
2	1:25	Stephen F Austin	DJ Ward 80-yard touchdown pass from Brady Attaway (Jordan Wiggs kick good)	31–28
2	0:11	Prairie View A&M	Patrick Gant 6-yard touchdown pass from Jerry Lovelock (Christopher Barrick kick good)	31–35
3	9:56	Prairie View A&M	Jerry Lovelock 3-yard touchdown run (Christopher Barrick kick good)	31–42
3	6:51	Stephen F Austin	Jordan Wiggs 30-yard field goal	34–42
3	3:16	Prairie View A&M	Jerry Lovelock 4-yard touchdown run (Christopher Barrick kick good)	34–49
4	6:33	Stephen F Austin	Aaron Thomas 76-yard touchdown pass from Brady Attaway (Jordan Wiggs kick good)	41–49
4	2:52	Prairie View A&M	Courtney Brown 41-yard touchdown run (Christopher Barrick kick good)	41–56
4	1:43	Stephen F Austin	Mike Brooks 26-yard touchdown pass from Brady Attaway (Jordan Wiggs kick good)	48–56

=== At Southeastern Louisiana ===
Stephen F. Austin at Southeastern Louisiana

Team	1	2	3	4	Total
Lumberjacks	7	0	7	0	14
• Lions	21	21	7	7	56

- Date: October 12
- Location: Strawberry Stadium
  Hammond, LA
- Game start: 7:05 PM CST
- Elapsed time: 3:10
- Game attendance: 5,080
- Game weather: 77 °F (25 °C), Cloudy
- Referee: Alan Eck
- TV announcers (ESPN3): Lincoln Rose and Rene Nadeau

Scoring summary
1	13:11	Southeastern Louisiana	Bryan Bennett 53-yard touchdown run (Seth Sebastian kick good)	0–7
1	11:10	Southeastern Louisiana	Rasheed Harrell 4-yard touchdown run (Seth Sebastian kick good)	0–14
1	6:30	Stephen F Austin	Gus Johnson 3-yard touchdown run (Jordan Wiggs kick good)	7–14
1	2:33	Southeastern Louisiana	Marice Sutton 45-yard Interception returned for a touchdown (Seth Sebastian kick good)	7–21
2	6:32	Southeastern Louisiana	Jeff Smiley 15-yard touchdown pass from Bryan Bennett (Seth Sebastian kick good)	7–28
2	3:21	Southeastern Louisiana	Tony McCrea 82-yard touchdown pass from Bryan Bennett (Seth Sebastian kick good)	7–35
2	0:34	Southeastern Louisiana	Marquis Fruge 77-yard touchdown pass from Bryan Bennett (Seth Sebastian kick good)	7–42
3	13:02	Southeastern Louisiana	Chris Malott 85-yard touchdown pass from Bryan Bennett (Seth Sebastian kick good)	7–49
3	9:47	Stephen F Austin	Braxton Bearden 3-yard touchdown pass from Brady Attaway (Jordan Wiggs kick good)	14–49
4	2:58	Southeastern Louisiana	Darius Guy 20-yard touchdown run, Seth Sebastian kick good	14–56

=== Nicholls State ===
Nicholls State at Stephen F. Austin

Team	1	2	3	4	Total
Colonels	14	7	14	6	41
• Lumberjacks	14	28	3	10	55

- Date: October 19
- Location: Homer Bryce Stadium
  Nacogdoches, TX
- Television network: SLC TV

Scoring summary
1	9:48	SFA	Gus Johnson 2-yard touchdown run, Jordan Wiggs kick	7–0
1	7:38	NICH	Dalton Hilliard 5-yard touchdown run, Andrew Dolan kick good	Tied 7–7
1	5:12	SFA	D.J. Ward 9-yard touchdown pass from Brady Attaway, Jordan Wiggs kick good	SFA 14–7
1	1:35	NICH	Dalton Hilliard 2-yard touchdown run, Andrew Dolan kick good	Tied 14–14
2	14:55	SFA	Mike Brooks 5-yard touchdown pass from Brady Attaway, Jordan Wiggs kick good	SFA 21–14
2	9:20	SFA	Aaron Thomas 9-yard touchdown pass from Brady Attaway, Jordan Wiggs kick good	SFA 28–14
2	7:41	NICH	Erik Buchanon 61-yard touchdown pass from Tuskani Figaro, Andrew Dolan kick good	SFA 28–21
2	6:15	SFA	Mike Brooks 6-yard touchdown pass from Brady Attaway, Jordan Wigg kick good	SFA 35–21
2	2:08	SFA	D.J. Ward 6-yard touchdown pass from Brady Attaway, Jordan Wigg kick good	SFA 42–21
3	11:44	NICH	Tuskani Figaro 43-yard touchdown run, Andrew Dolan kick good	SFA 42–28
3	9:25	NICH	Tuskani Figaro 12-yard touchdown run, Andrew Dolan kick good	SFA 42–35
3	7:17	SFA	Jordan Wiggs 40-yard field goal	SFA 45–35
4	9:28	SFA	Jordan Wiggs 21-yard field goal	SFA 48–35
4	7:45	SFA	Andrew Thomas 5-yard touchdown pass from Brady Attaway, Jordan Wiggs kick good	SFA 55–35
4	3:55	NICH	Dalton Hilliard Jr. 11-yard touchdown pass from Kalen Henderson, Andrew Dolan kick good	SFA 55–41

=== At Central Arkansas ===
Stephen F. Austin at Central Arkansas

Team	1	2	3	4	Total
Lumberjacks	3	7	14	7	31
• #23 Bears	7	14	38	7	66

- Date: October 26
- Location: Estes Stadium
  Conway, AR
- Television network: SLC TV

Scoring summary
1	7:45	SFA	Jordan Wiggs 39-yard field goal	SFA 3–0
1	4:56	UCA	Courtney Whitehead 2-yard touchdown pass from Ryan Howard, Eddie Camara kick good	UCA 7–3
2	14:18	UCA	Taylor Reed 12-yard touchdown run, Eddie Camara kick good	UCA 14–3
2	13:38	SFA	D.J. Ward 73-yard touchdown pass from Tyler Boyd, Jordan Wiggs kick good	UCA 14–10
2	12:48	UCA	Dezmin Lewis 45-yard touchdown pass from Ryan Howard, Eddie Camara kick good	UCA 21–10
3	14:47	UCA	Jatavious Wilson 85-yard kickoff return, Eddie Camara kick good	UCA 28–10
3	12:28	SFA	Tyler Boyd 4-yard touchdown pass from Brady Attaway, Jordan Wiggs kick good	UCA 28–17
3	11:27	UCA	Dezmin Lewis 34-yard touchdown pass from Darius Reed, Eddie Camara kick good	UCA 35–17
3	7:45	SFA	Tyler Boyd 10-yard touchdown pass from Brady Attaway, Jordan Wiggs kick good	UCA 35–24
3	6:47	UCA	Jose Moore 64-yard touchdown pass from Ryan Howard, Jace Denker kick good	UCA 42–24
3	5:22	UCA	Damien Watts 41-yard touchdown pass from Ryan Howard, Jace Denker kick good	UCA 49–24
3	4:22	UCA	Marvin Mitchell 98-yard touchdown interception return, Jace Denker kick good	UCA 56–24
3	0:42	UCA	Jace Denker 29-yard field goal	UCA 59–24
4	8:07	UCA	Kelton Warren 81-yard touchdown run, Jace Denker kick good	UCA 66–24
4	0:36	SFA	Joe Minden 2-yard touchdown run, Jordan Wiggs kick good	UCA 66–31

=== Vs. No. 8 Sam Houston State ===
Sam Houston State vs. Stephen F. Austin

Team	1	2	3	4	Total
• No. 8 Bearkats	14	7	7	28	56
Lumberjacks	14	7	7	21	49

- Date: November 2
- Location: Reliant Stadium
  Houston, TX
- Television network: SLC TV

Scoring summary
1	9:58	SHSU	Keshawn Hill 13-yard run, Luc Swimberghe kick	SHSU 7–0
1	6:27	SFA	Braxton Beardon 26-yard pass from Brady Attaway, Jordan Wiggs kick	Tied 7–7
1	3:21	SFA	Gus Johnson 14-yard run, Jordan Wiggs kick	SFA 14–7
1	0:03	SHSU	Timothy Flanders 11-yard run, Luc Swimberge kick	Tied 14–14
2	10:15	SFA	Keith Lawson 20-yard run, Jordan Wiggs kick	SFA 21–14
2	0:19	SHSU	Stephen Williams 15-yard pass from Brian Bell, Luc Swimberghe kick	Tied 21–21
3	11:32	SHSU	Shane Young 4-yard pass from Brian Bell, Luc Swimberge kick	SHSU 28–21
3	8:49	SFA	Mike Brooks 39-yard pass from Brady Attaway, Jordan Wiggs kick	Tied 28–28
4	14:53	SHSU	Torrance Williams 38-yard pass from Brian Bell, Luc Swimberghe kick	SHSU 35–28
4	13:16	SHSU	Keyshawn Hill 31-yard run, Luc Swimberghe kick	SHSU 42–28
4	13:01	SHSU	Ragan Henderson 16-yard pass from Brian Bell, Luc Swimberghe kick	SHSU 49–28
4	12:27	SHSU	DeAnthony Lache 45-yard interception return, Luc Swimberghe kick	SHSU 56–28
4	8:25	SFA	Mike Brooks 59-yard pass from Brady Attaway, Jordan Wiggs kick	SHSU 56–35
4	5:18	SFA	Tyler Boyd 75-yard pass from Brady Attaway, Jordan Wiggs kick	SHSU 56–42
4	1:20	SFA	Mike Brook 2-yard pass from Brady Attaway, Jordan Wiggs kick	SHSU 56–49

=== No. 11 McNeese State ===
McNeese State at Stephen F. Austin

Team	1	2	3	4	Total
• No. 11 Cowboys	21	24	17	7	69
Lumberjacks	24	0	7	7	38

- Date: November 9
- Location: Homer Bryce Stadium
  Nacogdoches, TX

Scoring summary
1	9:37	SFA	Tyler Boyd 62-yard touchdown pass from Brady Attaway, Jordan Wiggs kick	SFA 7–0
1	9:25	MCNS	Diontae Spencer 93-yard kickoff return, Ryan Rome kick	Tied 7–7
1	7:16	SFA	Jordan Wiggs 20-yard field goal	SFA 10–7
1	5:07	SFA	Tyler Boyd 17-yard touchdown pass from Brady Attaway, Jordan Wiggs kick	SFA 17–7
1	4:53	MCNS	Diontae Spencer 85-yard kickoff return, Ryan Rome kick	SFA 17–14
1	4:39	SFA	Mike Brooks 100-yard kickoff return, Jordan Wiggs kick	SFA 24–14
1	2:09	MCNS	Marcus Wiltz 2-yard touchdown run, Ryan Rome kick	SFA 24–21
2	8:08	MCNS	Ernest Celestie 71-yard touchdown pass from Cody Stroud, Ryan Rome kick	MCNS 28–24
2	7:24	MCNS	Zack Hetrick 4-yard touchdown pass from Cody Stroud, Ryan Rome kick	MCNS 35–24
2	2:37	MCNS	Diontae Spencer 10-yard touchdown pass from Cody Stroud, Ryan Rome kick	MCNS 42–24
2	0:05	MCNS	Ryan Rome 22-yard field goal	MCNS 45–24
3	7:54	MCNS	Ryan Rome 23-yard field goal	MCNS 48–24
3	7:20	SFA	Marquis Mosley 51-yard touchdown pass from Tyler Boyd, Jordan Wiggs kick	MCNS 48–31
3	5:29	MCNS	Dylan Long 1-yard touchdown run, Ryan Rome kick	MCNS 55–31
3	3:29	MCNS	Diontae Spencer 9-yard touchdown pass from Cody Stroud, Ryan Rome kick	MCNS 62–31
4	8:36	MCNS	Diontae Spencer 35-yard punt return, Ryan Rome kick	MCNS 69–31
4	3:38	MCNS	Braxton Beardon 11-yard pass from Joe Minden, Jordan Wiggs kick	MCNS 69–38

=== At Lamar ===
Stephen F. Austin at Lamar

Team	1	2	3	4	Total
Lumberjacks	14	14	3	14	45
• Cardinals	14	10	9	13	46

- Date: November 16
- Location: Provost Umphrey Stadium
  Beaumont, TX

Scoring summary
1	13:52	SFA	Tyler Boyd 55-yard touchdown pass from Brady Attaway, Jordan Wiggs kick	SFA 7–0
1	7:45	LAM	Mark Roberts 11-yard touchdown pass from Caleb Barry, Ryan Rome kick	Tied 7–7
1	5:24	LAM	Kade Harrington 1-yard touchdown run, Alex Ball kick	LAM 14–7
1	0:21	SFA	Marquis Mosley 20-yard touchdown pass from Brady Attaway, Jordan Wiggs kick	Tied 14–14
2	11:16	LAM	Alex Ball 28-yard field goal	LAM 17–14
2	9:52	LAM	Nashon Davis 0-yard return of blocked punt, Alex Jones kick	LAM 24–14
2	7:19	SFA	Gus Johnson 4-yard touchdown run, Jordan Wiggs kick	LAM 24–21
2	1:00	SFA	Keith Lawson 1-yard touchdown run, Jordan Wiggs kick	SFA 28–24
3	10:05	LAM	Alex Ball 35-yard field goal	SFA 28–27
3	4:27	LAM	Reggie Begelton 6-yard touchdown pass from Caleb Berry, two-point conversion failed	LAM 33–28
3	1:30	SFA	Jordan Wiggs 34-yard field goal	LAM 33–31
4	11:08	LAM	Alex Ball 26-yard field goal	LAM 36–31
4	10:26	SFA	Tyler Boyd 71-yard touchdown pass from Brady Attaway, Jordan Wiggs kick	SFA 38–36
4	4:59	SFA	Joshawa West 1-yard touchdown run, Jordan Wiggs kick	SFA 45–36
4	2:46	LAM	Reggie Begelton 20-yard touchdown pass from Caleb Barry, Alex Ball kick	SFA 45–43
4	0:15	LAM	Alex Ball 41-yard field goal	LAM 46–45

=== At Northwestern State ===
Stephen F. Austin at Northwestern State

Team	1	2	3	4	Total
Lumberjacks	7	17	3	0	27
• Demons	16	21	3	0	40

- Date: November 23
- Location: Harry Turpin Stadium
  Natchitoches, LA

Scoring summary
1	13:26	NWST	Imoan Clairborn 48-yard interception return, Chris Moore kick	NWST 7–0
1	13:15	NWST	Team Safety	NWST 9–0
1	11:11	NWST	Bryant Mitchell 2-yard touchdown pass from Zach Adkins, Chris Moore kick	NWST 16–0
1	8:50	SFA	Keith Lawson 47-yard touchdown run, Jordan Wiggs kick	NWST 16–7
2	12:48	NWST	Garrett Atzenweiler 2-yard touchdown run, Chris Moore kick	NWST 23–7
2	9:16	SFA	Jordan Wiggs 22-yard field goal	NWST 23–10
2	7:40	NWST	Louis Hollier Jr. 23-yard touchdown pass from Zach Adkins, Chris Moore kick	NWST 30–10
2	5:05	SFA	Mike Brooks 4-yard touchdown pass from Brady Attaway, Jordan Wiggs kick	NWST 30–17
2	1:22	NWST	Louis Hollier Jr. 38-yard touchdown pass from Zach Adkins, Chris Moore kick	NWST 37–17
2	0:19	SFA	Keith Lawson 2-yard touchdown run, Jordan Wiggs kick	NWST 37–24
3	9:51	SFA	Jordan Wiggs 23-yard field goal	NWST 37–27
3	5:18	NWST	Chris Moore 36-yard field goal	NWST 40–27

== Roster ==
2013 Stephen F. Austin Lumberjacks football team roster
Players			Coaches
Offense: Pos. / # / Name / Class	Defense: Pos. / # / Name / Class	Special teams: Pos. / # / Name / Class	Head coach: J. C. Harper (Clemson); Coordinators/assistant coaches: David Gibbs (Stephen F. Austin) Defensive coordinator/linebackers; Arlington Nunn (Clemson) Asst. head coach/special teams/ running backs; Chris Truax (LSU) Offensive coordinator/offensive line; Kevin Carberry (Ohio) Defensive ends; Troy Rogers (Stephen F. Austin) Outside receivers; Devin Ducote (Stephen F. Austin) Linebackers; Dan Eason (Missouri State) Strength & conditioning; Jeremy Moses (Stephen F. Austin) Quarterbacks; Nathan Schneider (LSU) Recruiting coordinator/insider receivers/director of football operations; Travis Barton (Stephen F. Austin) Student manager; C. J. Bolton (Stephen F. Austin) Student manager; Jose Castaneda (Stephen F. Austin) Student manager; Forrest Cox (Stephen F. Austin) Student manager; Dale Griffith (Stephen F. Austin) Student manager; Jacob Jeffries (Stephen F. Austin) Student manager; Matt O'Brien (Stephen F. Austin) Student manager; Legend: (C) Team captain; (S) Suspended; (I) Ineligible; Injured; Redshirt; Roster

== Ranking movements ==
Ranking movements Legend: ██ Increase in ranking ██ Decrease in ranking — = Not ranked RV = Received votes
	Week														
Poll	Pre	1	2	3	4	5	6	7	8	9	10	11	12	13	Final
Sports Network	—	—	—	—	RV	—	—	—	—	—	—	—	—	—	—
Coaches	—	—	—	—	RV	—	—	—	—	—	—	—	—	—	—
