= 2013 McNeese State Cowboys football team =

American college football season

2013 McNeese State Cowboys football

NCAA Division I Second Round, L 10–31 vs. Jacksonville State
- Conference: Southland Conference

Ranking
- Sports Network: No. 11
- FCS Coaches: No. 9
- Record: 10–3 (6–1 Southland)
- Head coach: Matt Viator (8th season)
- Offensive coordinator: Tim Leger (7th season)
- Defensive coordinator: Lance Guidry (1st season)
- Home stadium: Cowboy Stadium

2013 Southland Conference football standings
	Conf.			Overall
Team	W		L	W		L
No. 6 Southeastern Louisiana $^	7	–	0	11	–	3
No. 11 McNeese State ^	6	–	1	10	–	3
No. 14 Sam Houston State ^	4	–	3	9	–	5
Central Arkansas	4	–	3	7	–	5
Northwestern State	3	–	4	6	–	6
Lamar	2	–	5	5	–	7
Nicholls State	1	–	6	4	–	8
Stephen F. Austin	1	–	6	3	–	9
$ – Conference champion; ^ – FCS playoff participant; Rankings from The Sports Network poll

The 2013 McNeese State Cowboys football team represented McNeese State University as a member of the Southland Conference during the 2013 NCAA Division I FCS football season. Led by eighth-year head coach Matt Viator, the Cowboys compiled an overall record of 10–3 with a mark of 6–1 in conference play, placing second in the Southland. McNeese State received an at-large bid to NCAA Division I Football Championship playoffs, where, after a first-round bye, the Cowboys lost in the second round to Jacksonville State. The team played home games at Cowboy Stadium in Lake Charles, Louisiana.

== Schedule ==
Date	Time	Opponent	Rank	Site	TV	Result	Attendance
August 31	6:00 pm	at South Florida*		Raymond James Stadium; Tampa, FL	ESPN3	W 53–21	35,470
September 7	7:30 pm	Arkansas-Pine Bluff*	No. 18	Cowboy Stadium; Lake Charles, LA	CSNH	W 58–14	15,217
September 14	7:00 pm	West Alabama*	No. 13	Cowboy Stadium; Lake Charles, LA		W 44–42	10,107
September 21	7:00 pm	Weber State*	No. 12	Cowboy Stadium; Lake Charles, LA		W 43–6	8,893
September 28	4:00 pm	at No. 5 Northern Iowa*	No. 9	UNI-Dome; Cedar Falls, IA		L 6–41	12,325
October 5	3:00 pm	at No. 14 Central Arkansas	No. 11	Estes Stadium; Conway, AR (Red Beans and Rice Bowl)	SLCTV	W 59–28	10,247
October 19	7:00 pm	No. 2 Sam Houston State	No. 9	Cowboy Stadium; Lake Charles, LA	ESPN3	W 31–23	15,352
October 26	3:00 pm	at Nicholls State	No. 4	John L. Guidry Stadium; Thobodaux, LA		W 55–30	5,988
November 2	7:00 pm	No. 25 Southeastern Louisiana	No. 4	Cowboy Stadium; Lake Charles, LA		L 7–41	14,898
November 9	3:00 pm	at Stephen F. Austin	No. 11	Homer Bryce Stadium; Nacogdoches, TX		W 69–38	6,312
November 16	7:00 pm	Northwestern State	No. 9	Cowboy Stadium; Lake Charles, LA (rivalry)	ESPN3	W 43–17	15,003
November 23	3:00 pm	at Lamar	No. 6	Provost Umphrey Stadium; Beaumont, TX (Battle of the Border)		W 42–38	7,627
December 7	6:00 pm	No. 20 Jacksonville State*	No. 6	Cowboy Stadium; Lake Charles, LA (NCAA Division I Second Round)	ESPN3	L 10–31	5,036
*Non-conference game; Rankings from The Sports Network Poll released prior to the game; All times are in Central time

== Game summaries ==
=== South Florida ===
McNeese State at South Florida

Team	1	2	3	4	Total
• Cowboys	2	31	10	10	53
Bulls	7	0	7	7	21

- Date: August 31
- Location: Raymond James Stadium
  Tampa, FL
- Game start: 7:00 PM EST
- Elapsed time: 3:15
- Game attendance: 35,470
- Game weather: 88 °F (31 °C), Cloudy
- Referee: Todd LaPenta
- TV announcers (ESPN3): Drew Fellios, Doug Graber, and Tiffany Greene

Scoring summary
1	12:47	USF	Marcus Shaw 80-yard touchdown run, Marvin Kloss kick good	USF 7–0
1	7:55	MCN	30-yard Team Safety	USF 7–2
2	11:02	MCN	Kelvin Bennett 7-yard touchdown run, Ryan Rome kick good	MCN 9–7
2	10:38	MCN	Dylan Long 7-yard touchdown run, Ryan Rome kick good	MCN 16–7
2	6:47	MCN	Nic Jacobs 22-yard touchdown pass from Cody Stroud, Ryan Rome kick good	MCN 23–7
2	3:13	MCN	Jean Breaux 47-yard Field Goal	MCN 26–7
2	0:12	MCN	Guy Morgan 76-yard Interception return for a touchdown, Ryan Rome kick good	MCN 33–7
3	12:46	MCN	Dylan Long 1-yard touchdown run, Ryan Rome kick good	MCN 40–7
3	11:23	USF	Stephen Bravo-Brown 59-yard touchdown pass from Bobby Eveld, Marvin Kloss kick good	MCN 40–14
3	4:23	MCN	Ryan Rome 32-yard Field Goal	MCN 43–14
4	13:57	USF	Andre Davis 7-yard touchdown pass from Bobby Eveld, Marvin Kloss kick good	MCN 43–21
4	12:59	MCN	Nic Jacobs 22-yard touchdown pass from Cody Stroud, Ryan Rome kick good	MCN 50–21
4	5:37	MCN	Ryan Rome 24-yard Field Goal	MCN 53–21

McNeese State received $400,000 to play the upper division (FBS) South Florida Bulls to open the 2013 season for both programs. The Bulls prior record as an FBS team playing against FCS teams was 23–0; USF was a 20.5 point favorite before the game. The Cowboys spoiled Willie Taggart's debut as the Bulls' head coach, winning 53–21. The 32-point margin was the largest margin of victory by any FCS team over an FBS team since Division I was split into FBS and FCS in 1978.

=== Arkansas-Pine Bluff ===
Arkansas–Pine Bluff at McNeese State

Team	1	2	3	4	Total
Golden Lions	7	7	0	0	14
• #18 Cowboys	14	23	14	7	58

- Date: September 7
- Location: Cowboy Stadium
  Lake Charles, LA
- Game start: 7:37 PM CST
- Elapsed time: 2:48
- Game attendance: 15,217
- Game weather: 82 °F (28 °C), Cloudy, Winds SSW @ 6mph
- Referee: Ken Ray
- TV announcers (CSNH): David Saltzman, ND Kalu & Bart Enis

Scoring summary
1	11:40	MCN	Marcus Wiltz 12-yard touchdown run, Ryan Rome kick good	MCN 7–0
1	6:00	UAPB	Jamie Smith 7-yard touchdown run, Tyler Strickland kick good	Tied 7–7
1	0:24	MCN	Dylan Long 1-yard touchdown run, Ryan Rome kick good	MCN 14–7
2	14:30	UAPB	Jeremiah Young 2-yard touchdown run, Tyler Strickland kick good	Tied 14–14
2	12:32	MCN	Tyler Bolfing 7-yard touchdown run, Ryan Rome kick good	MCN 21–14
2	11:42	MCN	1-yard Team Safety	MCN 23–14
2	10:11	MCN	Marcus Wiltz 22-yard touchdown run, Ryan Rome kick good	MCN 30–14
2	0:41	MCN	Marcus Wiltz 6-yard touchdown run, Ryan Rome kick good	MCN 37–14
3	14:12	MCN	Ernest Celestie 33-yard touchdown pass from Cody Stroud, Ryan Rome kick good	MCN 44–14
3	1:56	MCN	Dylan Long 12-yard touchdown pass from Cody Stroud, Ryan Rome kick good	MCN 51–14
4	9:58	MCN	Jontrey Tillman 9-yard touchdown run, Ryan Rome kick good	MCN 58–14

=== West Alabama ===
West Alabama at McNeese State

Team	1	2	3	4	Total
Tigers	14	7	14	7	42
• #13 Cowboys	14	10	7	13	44

- Date: September 14
- Location: Cowboy Stadium
  Lake Charles, LA
- Game start: 7:00 PM CST
- Elapsed time: 3:05
- Game attendance: 10,107
- Game weather: 80 °F (27 °C), Partly Cloudy, Winds E @ 6mph
- Referee: Ross Smith

Scoring summary
1	14:48	UWA	Chad Toocheck 75-yard touchdown pass from Kyle Caldwell, Mark Grant kick good	UWA 7–0
1	10:35	MCN	Zach Hetrick 3-yard touchdown pass from Cody Stroud, Ryan Rome kick good	Tied 7–7
1	7:40	UWA	Seth Roberts 26-yard touchdown pass from Kyle Caldwell, Mark Grant kick good	UWA 14–7
1	1:49	MCN	Wes Briscoe 16-yard touchdown pass from Cody Stroud, Ryan Rome kick good	Tied 14–14
2	13:11	UWA	Gary Johnston 1-yard touchdown run, Mark Grant kick good	UWA 21–14
2	10:39	MCN	Ryan Rome 31-yard Field Goal	UWA 21–17
2	4:17	MCN	Nic Jacobs 4-yard touchdown pass from Cody Stroud, Ryan Rome kick good	MCN 24–21
3	12:49	UWA	Ty Morgan 57-yard touchdown pass from Kyle Caldwell, Mark Grant kick good	UWA 28–24
3	6:34	MCN	Dylan Long 1-yard touchdown run, Ryan Rome kick good	MCN 31–28
3	0:22	UWA	Kedrick Rhodes 29-yard touchdown run, Mark Grant kick good	UWA 35–31
4	12:58	MCN	Jereon McGilvery 28-yard touchdown pass from Cody Stroud, Ryan Rome kick good	MCN 38–35
4	3:41	UWA	Gary Johnston 2-yard touchdown run, Mark Grant kick good	UWA 42–38
4	0:46	MCN	Diontae Spencer 20-yard touchdown pass from Cody Stroud, Ryan Rome kick blocked	MCN 44–42

=== Weber State ===
Weber State at McNeese State

Team	1	2	3	4	Total
Wildcats	6	0	0	0	6
• #12 Cowboys	7	10	13	13	43

- Date: September 21
- Location: Cowboy Stadium
  Lake Charles, LA
- Game start: 7:00 PM CST
- Elapsed time: 2:53
- Game attendance: 8,893
- Game weather: 73 °F (23 °C), Cloudy w/ 70% chance of rain, Winds NNE @ 12mph
- Referee: C. Castleberry

Scoring summary
1	9:41	WSU	Cam Livingston 48-yard touchdown pass from Austin Chipoletti, Austin Chipoletti rush failed	WSU 6–0
1	2:55	MCN	Wallace Scott 69-yard Interception returned for a touchdown, Ryan Rome kick good	MCN 7–6
2	14:45	MCN	Kelvin Bennett 48-yard touchdown run, Ryan Rome kick good	MCN 14–6
2	5:40	MCN	Ryan Rome 35-yard Field Goal	MCN 17–6
3	7:15	MCN	Ernest Celestie 43-yard touchdown pass from Cody Stroud, Ryan Rome kick good	MCN 24–6
3	1:36	MCN	Marcus Wiltz 11-yard touchdown run, Ryan Rome kick blocked	MCN 30–6
4	14:49	MCN	Ernest Celestie 60-yard touchdown run, Ryan Rome kick failed	MCN 36–6
4	9:55	MCN	Kelvin Bennett 50-yard touchdown run, Jean Breaux kick good	MCN 43–6

=== Northern Iowa ===
McNeese State at Northern Iowa

Team	1	2	3	4	Total
#9 Cowboys	0	0	6	0	6
• #5 Panthers	7	10	14	10	41

- Date: September 28
- Location: UNI-Dome
  Cedar Falls, IA
- Game attendance: 12,325

=== Central Arkansas ===
McNeese State at Central Arkansas

Team	1	2	3	4	Total
• #11 Cowboys	7	35	7	10	59
#14 Bears	7	14	7	0	28

- Date: October 5
- Location: Estes Stadium
  Conway, AR
- Television network: SLCTV

=== Sam Houston State ===
McNeese State at Sam Houston State

Team	1	2	3	4	Total
#9 Cowboys	0	0	0	0	0
#2 Bearkats	0	0	0	0	0

- Date: October 19
- Location: Bowers Stadium
  Huntsville, TX
- Television network: ESPN3

=== Nicholls State ===
McNeese State at Nicholls State

Team	1	2	3	4	Total
Cowboys	0	0	0	0	0
Colonels	0	0	0	0	0

- Date: October 26
- Location: John L. Guidry Stadium
  Thibodaux, LA

=== Southeastern Louisiana ===
Southeastern Louisiana at McNeese State

Team	1	2	3	4	Total
Lions	0	0	0	0	0
Cowboys	0	0	0	0	0

- Date: November 2
- Location: Cowboy Stadium
  Lake Charles, LA

=== Stephen F. Austin ===
McNeese State at Stephen F. Austin

Team	1	2	3	4	Total
• #11 Cowboys	21	24	17	7	69
Lumberjacks	24	0	7	7	38

- Date: November 9
- Location: Homer Bryce Stadium
  Nacogdoches, TX

Scoring summary
1	9:37	SFA	Tyler Boyd 62-yard touchdown pass from Brady Attaway, Jordan Wiggs kick	SFA 7–0
1	9:25	MCNS	Diontae Spencer 93-yard kickoff return, Ryan Rome kick	Tied 7–7
1	7:16	SFA	Jordan Wiggs 20-yard field goal	SFA 10–7
1	5:07	SFA	Tyler Boyd 17-yard touchdown pass from Brady Attaway, Jordan Wiggs kick	SFA 17–7
1	4:53	MCNS	Diontae Spencer 85-yard kickoff return, Ryan Rome kick	SFA 17–14
1	4:39	SFA	Mike Brooks 100-yard kickoff return, Jordan Wiggs kick	SFA 24–14
1	2:09	MCNS	Marcus Wiltz 2-yard touchdown run, Ryan Rome kick	SFA 24–21
2	8:08	MCNS	Ernest Celestie 71-yard touchdown pass from Cody Stroud, Ryan Rome kick	MCNS 28–24
2	7:24	MCNS	Zack Hetrick 4-yard touchdown pass from Cody Stroud, Ryan Rome kick	MCNS 35–24
2	2:37	MCNS	Diontae Spencer 10-yard touchdown pass from Cody Stroud, Ryan Rome kick	MCNS 42–24
2	0:05	MCNS	Ryan Rome 22-yard field goal	MCNS 45–24
3	7:54	MCNS	Ryan Rome 23-yard field goal	MCNS 48–24
3	7:20	SFA	Marquis Mosley 51-yard touchdown pass from Tyler Boyd, Jordan Wiggs kick	MCNS 48–31
3	5:29	MCNS	Dylan Long 1-yard touchdown run, Ryan Rome kick	MCNS 55–31
3	3:29	MCNS	Diontae Spencer 9-yard touchdown pass from Cody Stroud, Ryan Rome kick	MCNS 62–31
4	8:36	MCNS	Diontae Spencer 35-yard punt return, Ryan Rome kick	MCNS 69–31
4	3:38	MCNS	Braxton Beardon 11-yard pass from Joe Minden, Jordan Wiggs kick	MCNS 69–38

=== Northwestern State ===
Northwestern State at McNeese State

Team	1	2	3	4	Total
Demons	0	0	0	0	0
Cowboys	0	0	0	0	0

- Date: November 16
- Location: Cowboy Stadium
  Lake Charles, LA
- Television network: ESPN3

=== Lamar ===
McNeese State at Lamar

Team	1	2	3	4	Total
Demons	0	0	0	0	0
Cowboys	0	0	0	0	0

- Date: November 23
- Location: Provost Umphrey Stadium
  Beaumont, TX

== Ranking movements ==
Ranking movements Legend: ██ Increase in ranking ██ Decrease in ranking — = Not ranked
	Week														
Poll	Pre	1	2	3	4	5	6	7	8	9	10	11	12	13	Final
Sports Network	—	18	13	12	9	11	9	9	4	4	11	9	6	6	11
Coaches	—	20	18	13	9	14	11	10	7	7	13	11	8	6	9

== Media ==
All McNeese State games were broadcast on Gator 99.5 FM. KVHP 30.2 is the local affiliate for SLC TV and aired McNeese State games on SLC TV.
