= 2013 Nicholls State Colonels football team =

American college football season

2013 Nicholls State Colonels football
- Conference: Southland Conference
- Record: 4–8 (1–6 Southland)
- Head coach: Charlie Stubbs (4th season)
- Offensive scheme: Multiple pro-style
- Defensive coordinator: Jeremy Atwell (5th season)
- Base defense: 3–4
- Home stadium: John L. Guidry Stadium

2013 Southland Conference football standings
	Conf.			Overall
Team	W		L	W		L
No. 6 Southeastern Louisiana $^	7	–	0	11	–	3
No. 11 McNeese State ^	6	–	1	10	–	3
No. 14 Sam Houston State ^	4	–	3	9	–	5
Central Arkansas	4	–	3	7	–	5
Northwestern State	3	–	4	6	–	6
Lamar	2	–	5	5	–	7
Nicholls State	1	–	6	4	–	8
Stephen F. Austin	1	–	6	3	–	9
$ – Conference champion; ^ – FCS playoff participant; Rankings from The Sports Network poll

The 2013 Nicholls State Colonels football team represented Nicholls State University as a member of the Southland Conference during the 2013 NCAA Division I FCS football season. Led by fourth-year head coach Charlie Stubbs, the Colonels compiled an overall record of 4–6 with a mark of 1–6 in conference play, tying for seventh place in the Southland. Nicholls State played home games at John L. Guidry Stadium in Thibodaux, Louisiana.

== Schedule ==
Date	Time	Opponent	Site	TV	Result	Attendance
August 31	3:00 pm	at No. 3 (FBS) Oregon*	Autzen Stadium; Eugene, OR	FS1	L 3–66	57,769
September 7	6:00 pm	at Western Michigan (FBS)*	Waldo Stadium; Kalamazoo, MI	ESPN3	W 27–23	24,163
September 14	6:00 pm	at Louisiana–Lafayette*	Cajun Field; Lafayette, LA	ESPN3	L 7–70	28,871
September 21	6:00 pm	Langston*	John L. Guidry Stadium; Thibodaux, LA		W 42–22	5,011
September 28	6:00 pm	Arkansas Tech*^{†}	John L. Guidry Stadium; Thibodaux, LA		W 44–34	5,292
October 12	3:00 pm	Northwestern State	John L. Guidry Stadium; Thibodaux, LA (NSU Challenge)	SLCTV	W 33–21	5,111
October 19	3:00 pm	at Stephen F. Austin	Homer Bryce Stadium; Nacogdoches, TX	SLCTV	L 41–55	12,090
October 26	3:00 pm	No. 4 McNeese State	John L. Guidry Stadium; Thibodaux, LA		L 30–55	5,988
November 2	6:00 pm	at Lamar	Provost Umphrey Stadium; Beaumont, TX		L 34–56	7,738
November 9	2:00 pm	at No. 6 Sam Houston State	Bowers Stadium; Huntsville, TX		L 24–49	7,507
November 16	3:00 pm	Central Arkansas	John L. Guidry Stadium; Thibodaux, LA		L 10–17	5,119
November 21	6:00 pm	at No. 8 Southeastern Louisiana	Strawberry Stadium; Hammond, LA (River Bell Classic)	ESPN3/WSNO^	L 27–52	6,821
*Non-conference game; ^{†}Homecoming; Rankings from The Sports Network Poll released prior to the game; All times are in Central time

^Tape delayed airing

== Game summaries ==
=== Oregon ===
Nicholls State at #3 (FBS) Oregon

Team	1	2	3	4	Total
Colonels	0	3	0	0	3
• #3 (FBS) Ducks	24	14	7	21	66

- Date: August 31
- Location: Autzen Stadium
  Eugene, OR
- Game start: 1:05 PM PST
- Elapsed time: 3:39
- Game attendance: 57,769
- Game weather: 80 °F (27 °C), Sunny, winds calm
- Referee: Jack Wood
- TV announcers (FS1): Justin Kutcher, James Bates, and Brady Poppinga

Scoring summary
1	13:29	ORE	De'Anthony Thomas 4-yard touchdown run, Alejandro Maldonado kick good	ORE 7–0
1	10:29	ORE	Bralon Addison 27-yard touchdown pass from Marcus Mariota, Matt Wogan kick good	ORE 14–0
1	6:28	ORE	De'Anthony Thomas 22-yard touchdown run, Alejandro Maldonado kick good	ORE 21–0
1	5:04	ORE	Alejandro Maldonado 29-yard Field Goal	ORE 24–0
2	14:16	NICH	Andrew Dolan 35-yard Field Goal	ORE 24–3
2	12:58	ORE	Marcus Mariota 12-yard touchdown run, Matt Wogan kick good	ORE 31–3
2	6:20	ORE	Marcus Mariota 49-yard touchdown run, Alejandro Maldonado kick good	ORE 38–3
3	0:49	ORE	Byron Marshall 49-yard touchdown run, Alejandro Maldonado kick good	ORE 45–3
4	11:20	ORE	Colt Lyerla 3-yard touchdown run, Matt Wogan kick good	ORE 52–3
4	6:42	ORE	Jeff Lockie 8-yard touchdown run, Alejandro Maldonado kick good	ORE 59–3
4	3:45	ORE	Chance Allen 23-yard touchdown pass from Jake Rodrigues, Alejandro Maldonado Kick good	ORE 66–3

=== Western Michigan ===
Nicholls State at Western Michigan

Team	1	2	3	4	Total
• Colonels	14	7	0	6	27
Broncos	0	9	14	0	23

- Date: September 7
- Location: Waldo Stadium
  Kalamazoo, MI
- Game start: 7:05 PM CST
- Elapsed time: 3:38
- Game attendance: 24,163
- Game weather: 80 °F (27 °C), Overcast, winds W @ 6mph
- Referee: Jeff Servinski
- TV announcers (ESPN3): Dan Gutowsky & Forrest Connolly

Scoring summary
1	12:48	NICH	Marcus Washington 8-yard touchdown run, Andrew Dolan kick good	NICH 7–0
1	1:31	NICH	Kalen Henderson 1-yard touchdown run, Andrew Dolan kick good	NICH 14–0
2	13:41	WMU	Andrew Haldeman 42-yard Field Goal	NICH 14–3
2	6:53	WMU	Brian Fields 2-yard touchdown run, Desmond Bozeman 2-point pass failed	NICH 14–9
2	5:07	NICH	Marcus Washington 4-yard touchdown run, Andrew Dolan kick good	NICH 21–9
3	12:51	WMU	Brian Fields 13-yard touchdown run, Andrew Haldeman kick good	NICH 21–16
3	3:13	WMU	Brian Fields 9-yard touchdown run, Andrew Haldeman kick good	WMU 23–21
4	11:19	NICH	Andrew Dolan 29-yard Field Goal	NICH 24–23
4	1:44	NICH	Andrew Dolan 28-yard Field Goal	NICH 27–23

=== Louisiana-Lafayette ===
Nicholls State at Louisiana-Lafayette

Team	1	2	3	4	Total
Colonels	0	7	0	0	7
• Ragin' Cajuns	28	21	14	7	70

- Date: September 14
- Location: Cajun Field
  Lafayette, LA
- Game start: 6:04 PM CST
- Elapsed time: 3:24
- Game attendance: 28,871
- Game weather: 80 °F (27 °C), Fair, winds SSE @ 8mph
- Referee: Jason Autrey
- TV announcers (ESPN3): Roy Philpott & Stan Lewter

Scoring summary
1	13:41	ULL	Alonzo Harris 65-yard touchdown run, Steph Brauchle kick good	ULL 7–0
1	7:50	ULL	Terrance Broadway 24-yard touchdown run, Steph Brauchle kick good	ULL 14–0
1	1:47	ULL	Torrey Pierce 7-yard touchdown run, Steph Brauchle kick good	ULL 21–0
1	0:53	ULL	Justin Anderson 58-yard Interception returned for a touchdown, Steph Brauchle kick good	ULL 28–0
2	5:45	ULL	Torrey Pierce 2-yard touchdown run, Steph Brauchle kick good	ULL 35–0
2	3:23	ULL	Elijah McGuire 4-yard touchdown run, Steph Brauchle kick good	ULL 42–0
2	2:28	ULL	Elijah McGuire 11-yard touchdown run, Steph Brauchle kick good	ULL 49–0
2	1:25	NICH	Demon Bolt 36-yard touchdown pass from Tuskani Figaro, Andrew Dolan kick good	ULL 49–7
3	11:15	ULL	Jamal Robinson 25-yard touchdown pass from Terra Broadway, Steph Brauchle kick good	ULL 56–7
3	8:24	ULL	Elijah McGuire 42-yard touchdown run, Steph Brauchle kick good	ULL 63–7
4	14:03	ULL	Montrel Carter 1-yard touchdown run, Steph Brauchle kick good	ULL 70–7

=== Langston ===
Langston at Nicholls State

Team	1	2	3	4	Total
Lions	9	7	0	6	22
• Colonels	7	14	7	14	42

- Date: September 21
- Location: John L. Guidry Stadium
  Thibodaux, LA
- Game start: 6:00 PM CST
- Elapsed time: 3:00
- Game attendance: 5,011
- Game weather: 77 °F (25 °C), Overcast and Rainy
- Referee: Ross Smith

Scoring summary
1	11:02	NICH	Josh Hanberry 19-yard touchdown pass from Beaux Hebert, Andrew Dolan kick good	NICH 7–0
1	8:28	LU	Mark Wright, Jr. 1-yard touchdown run, Michael Ryan kick good	Tied 7–7
1	3:49	LU	Team Safety	LU 9–7
2	12:49	LU	Talibb Woods 47-yard fumble recovery for a touchdown, Michael Ryan kick good	LU 16–7
2	8:16	NICH	Josh Hanberry 11-yard touchdown pass from Beaux Hebert, Andrew Dolan kick good	LU 16–14
2	0:30	NICH	Marcus Washington 3-yard touchdown pass from Beaux Hebert, Andrew Dolan kick good	NICH 21–16
3	0:34	NICH	Marcus Washington 4-yard touchdown run, Andrew Dolan kick good	NICH 28–16
4	6:22	NICH	Carey Fortson 16-yard touchdown pass from Beaux Hebert, Andrew Dolan kick good	NICH 35–16
4	3:01	LU	Mark Thigpen 7-yard touchdown run, Mark Thigpen 2-point pass failed	NICH 35–22
4	0:36	NICH	Dalton Hilliard 16-yard Touchdown Run, Andrew Dolan kick good	NICH 42–22

=== Arkansas Tech ===
Arkansas Tech at Nicholls State

Team	1	2	3	4	Total
Wonderboys	0	21	3	10	34
• Colonels	14	13	7	10	44

- Date: September 28
- Location: John L. Guidry Stadium
  Thibodaux, LA
- Game attendance: 5,292

=== Northwestern State ===
Northwestern State at Nicholls State

Team	1	2	3	4	Total
Demons	0	0	7	14	21
• Colonels	6	21	6	0	33

- Date: October 12
- Location: John L. Guidry Stadium
  Thibodaux, LA
- Television network: SLC TV

=== Stephen F. Austin ===
Nicholls State at Stephen F. Austin

Team	1	2	3	4	Total
Colonels	14	7	14	6	41
• Lumberjacks	14	28	3	10	55

- Date: October 19
- Location: Homer Bryce Stadium
  Nacogdoches, TX
- Television network: SLC TV

Scoring summary
1	9:48	SFA	Gus Johnson 2-yard touchdown run, Jordan Wiggs kick	SFA 7–0
1	7:38	NICH	Dalton Hilliard 5-yard touchdown run, Andrew Dolan kick good	Tied 7–7
1	5:12	SFA	D.J. Ward 9-yard touchdown pass from Brady Attaway, Jordan Wiggs kick good	SFA 14–7
1	1:35	NICH	Dalton Hilliard 2-yard touchdown run, Andrew Dolan kick good	Tied 14–14
2	14:55	SFA	Mike Brooks 5-yard touchdown pass from Brady Attaway, Jordan Wiggs kick good	SFA 21–14
2	9:20	SFA	Aaron Thomas 9-yard touchdown pass from Brady Attaway, Jordan Wiggs kick good	SFA 28–14
2	7:41	NICH	Erik Buchanon 61-yard touchdown pass from Tuskani Figaro, Andrew Dolan kick good	SFA 28–21
2	6:15	SFA	Mike Brooks 6-yard touchdown pass from Brady Attaway, Jordan Wigg kick good	SFA 35–21
2	2:08	SFA	D.J. Ward 6-yard touchdown pass from Brady Attaway, Jordan Wigg kick good	SFA 42–21
3	11:44	NICH	Tuskani Figaro 43-yard touchdown run, Andrew Dolan kick good	SFA 42–28
3	9:25	NICH	Tuskani Figaro 12-yard touchdown run, Andrew Dolan kick good	SFA 42–35
3	7:17	SFA	Jordan Wiggs 40-yard field goal	SFA 45–35
4	9:28	SFA	Jordan Wiggs 21-yard field goal	SFA 48–35
4	7:45	SFA	Andrew Thomas 5-yard touchdown pass from Brady Attaway, Jordan Wiggs kick good	SFA 55–35
4	3:55	NICH	Dalton Hilliard Jr. 11-yard touchdown pass from Kalen Henderson, Andrew Dolan kick good	SFA 55–41

=== McNeese State ===
McNeese State at Nicholls State

Team	1	2	3	4	Total
• #4 Cowboys	14	13	21	7	55
Colonels	3	7	13	7	30

- Date: October 26
- Location: John L. Guidry Stadium
  Thibodaux, LA
- Game start: 3:00 CST
- Elapsed time: 3:06
- Game attendance: 5,988
- Game weather: 70° F, Perfect
- Referee: Randy Christal

Scoring summary
1	11:23	NICH	Andrew Dolan 48 yard field goal	NICH 3–0
1	6:02	MCN	Cody Stroud pass complete to Diontae Spencer for 5 yards for a touchdown, Ryan Rome kick	MCN 7–3
1	1:09	MCN	Dylan Long rush for 2 yards for a touchdown, Ryan Rome kick	MCN 14–3
2	12:43	MCN	Dylan Long rush for 4 yards for a touchdown, Ryan Rome kick	MCN 21–3
2	8:20	NICH	Kalen Henderson pass complete to Erik Buchanan for 42 yards for a touchdown, Andrew Dolan kick	MCN 21–10
2	4:45	MCN	Ryan Rome 30 yard field goal	MCN 24–10
2	0:30	MCN	Ryan Rome 43 yard field goal	MCN 27–10
3	11:59	MCN	Marcus Wiltz rush for 17 yards for a touchdown, Ryan Rome kick	MCN 34–10
3	11:19	NICH	Tuskani Figaro rush for 21 yards for a touchdown, Andrew Dolan kick	MCN 34–17
3	9:42	MCN	Marcus Wiltz 5 yd touchdown run, Ryan Rome kick	MCN 41–17
3	0:02	NICH	Erik Buchanon 4 yd touchdown pass from Kalen Henderson, Andrew Dolan kick failed	MCN 41–23
3	0:00	MCN	Khalil Thomas 94 yd kickoff return, Ryan Rome kick	MCN 48–23
4	11:23	MCN	Zach Hetrick 0 yd fumble return, Ryan Rome kick	MCN 55–23
4	7:46	NICH	Kalen Henderson 5–yard touchdown run, Andrew Dolan kick	MCN 55–30

=== Lamar ===
Nicholls State at Lamar

Team	1	2	3	4	Total
Colonels	0	17	10	7	34
• Cardinals	7	28	0	21	56

- Date: November 2
- Location: Provost Umphrey Stadium
  Beaumont, TX
- Game start: 6:00 CST
- Elapsed time: 3:27
- Game attendance: 7738
- Game weather: 66° F, Clear Skies, Wind: 21
- Referee: Ken Ray

=== Sam Houston State ===
Nicholls State at Sam Houston State

Team	1	2	3	4	Total
Colonels	3	0	0	21	24
• #6 Bearkats	7	14	28	0	49

- Date: November 9
- Location: Bowers Stadium
  Huntsville, TX
- Game start: 2:00 CST
- Elapsed time: 3:00
- Game attendance: 7507
- Referee: R. Smith
- Television network: BSN

=== Central Arkansas ===
Central Arkansas at Nicholls State

Team	1	2	3	4	Total
• Bears	7	10	0	0	17
Colonels	3	0	0	7	10

- Date: November 16
- Location: John L. Guidry Stadium
  Thibodaux, LA
- Game start: 3:05 CST
- Elapsed time: 2:52
- Game attendance: 5119
- Game weather: 74° F
- Referee: Grantis Bell

=== Southeastern Louisiana ===
Nicholls State at Southeastern Louisiana

Team	1	2	3	4	Total
Colonels	7	7	6	7	27
• #8 Lions	10	3	32	7	52

- Date: November 21
- Location: Strawberry Stadium
  Hammond, LA
- Game start: 6:05 CST
- Elapsed time: 3:16
- Game attendance: 6,821
- Game weather: 69° F, Cloudy, Wind: E 5
- Referee: Ross Smith

== Media ==
Nicholls State football games were broadcast live on the radio through KLRZ 100.3 FM, KLEB AM 1600, and KBZE 105.9 FM. KLRZ and KLEB also streamed the games online.
