= Harry Turpin Stadium =

Stadium in Natchitoches, Louisiana

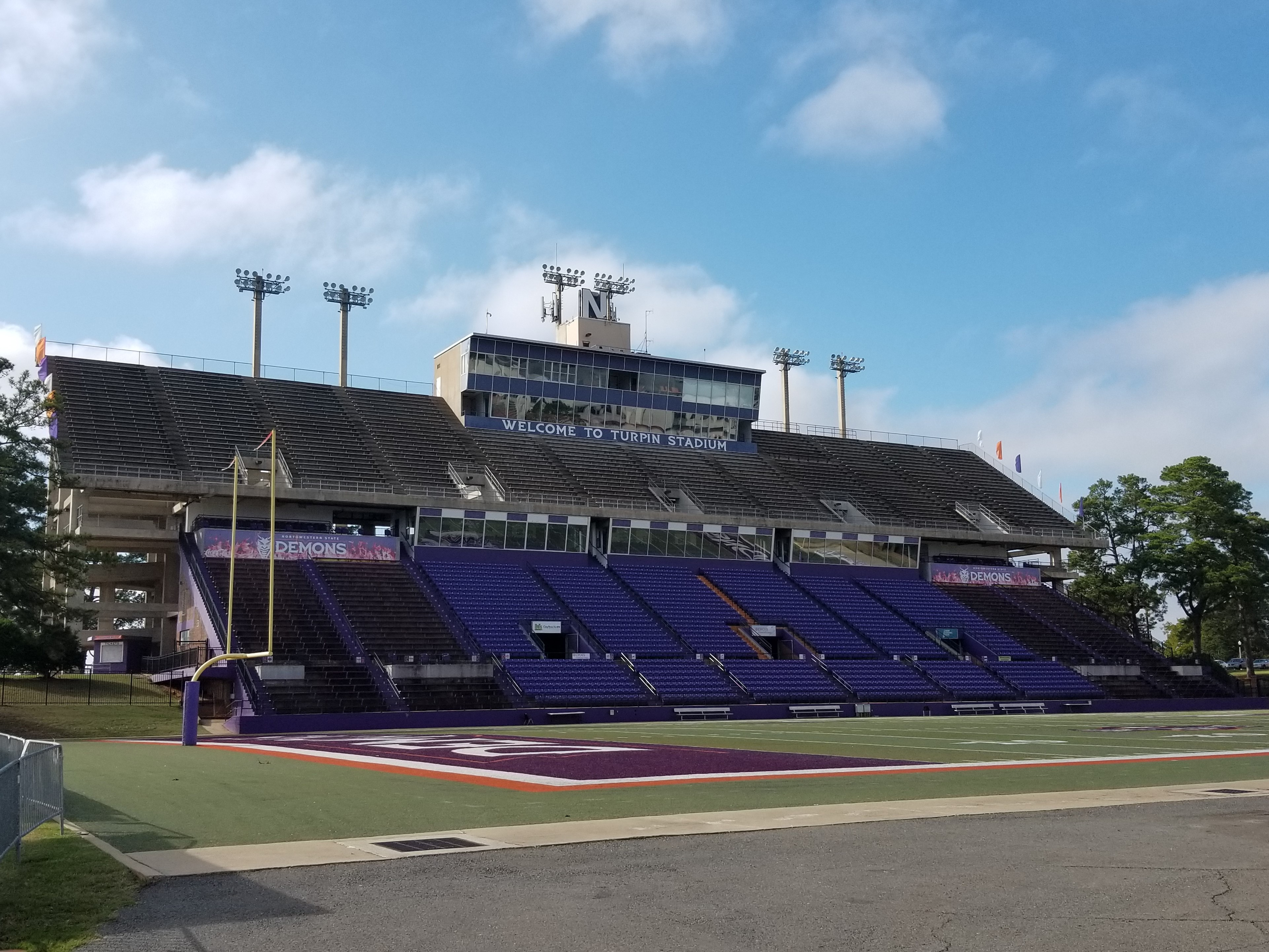
- Interactive map of Harry Turpin Stadium
- Location: Caspari Street; Natchitoches, LA 71457
- Coordinates: 31°44′50″N 93°5′46″W
- Owner: Northwestern State University
- Operator: Northwestern State University
- Capacity: 15,971
- Executive suites: 3 VIP suites, 8 seats per suite
- Surface: Fieldturf
- Record attendance: 17,528 on Sept. 9, 2000 vs Southern

Construction
- Opened: 1975
- Architects: Harold E. Pique & Associates
- General contractor: Tudor Construction Company

Tenant
- Northwestern State Demons football (NCAA)

Harry Turpin Stadium is a 15,971-seat multi-purpose stadium in Natchitoches, Louisiana. It opened in 1975 and is home to the Northwestern State University Demons football team.

== History ==
Donald Gray Horton (1945–2013), a Coushatta lawyer and philanthropist who served as the long-term president of the NSU Athletic Association, formulated the establishment in 2003 of the innovative Demon Alley tailgating zone south of Turpin Stadium. The zone is equipped with utility connections, including cable television.

== Top 10 crowds ==
1. 17,528 Southern Jaguars 09/02/00
2. 17,031 McNeese State Cowboys 11/16/02
3. 16,706 Southern Jaguars 09/05/98
4. 16,222 Southern Jaguars 09/07/96
5. 15,600 Southern Jaguars 09/03/93
6. 14,873 Southern Jaguars 09/07/13
7. 14,591 McNeese State Cowboys 10/16/04
8. 14,586 McNeese State Cowboys 10/22/00
9. 14,436 Tarleton State Texans 09/18/99
10. 14,247 McNeese State Cowboys 10/15/98

== Gallery ==
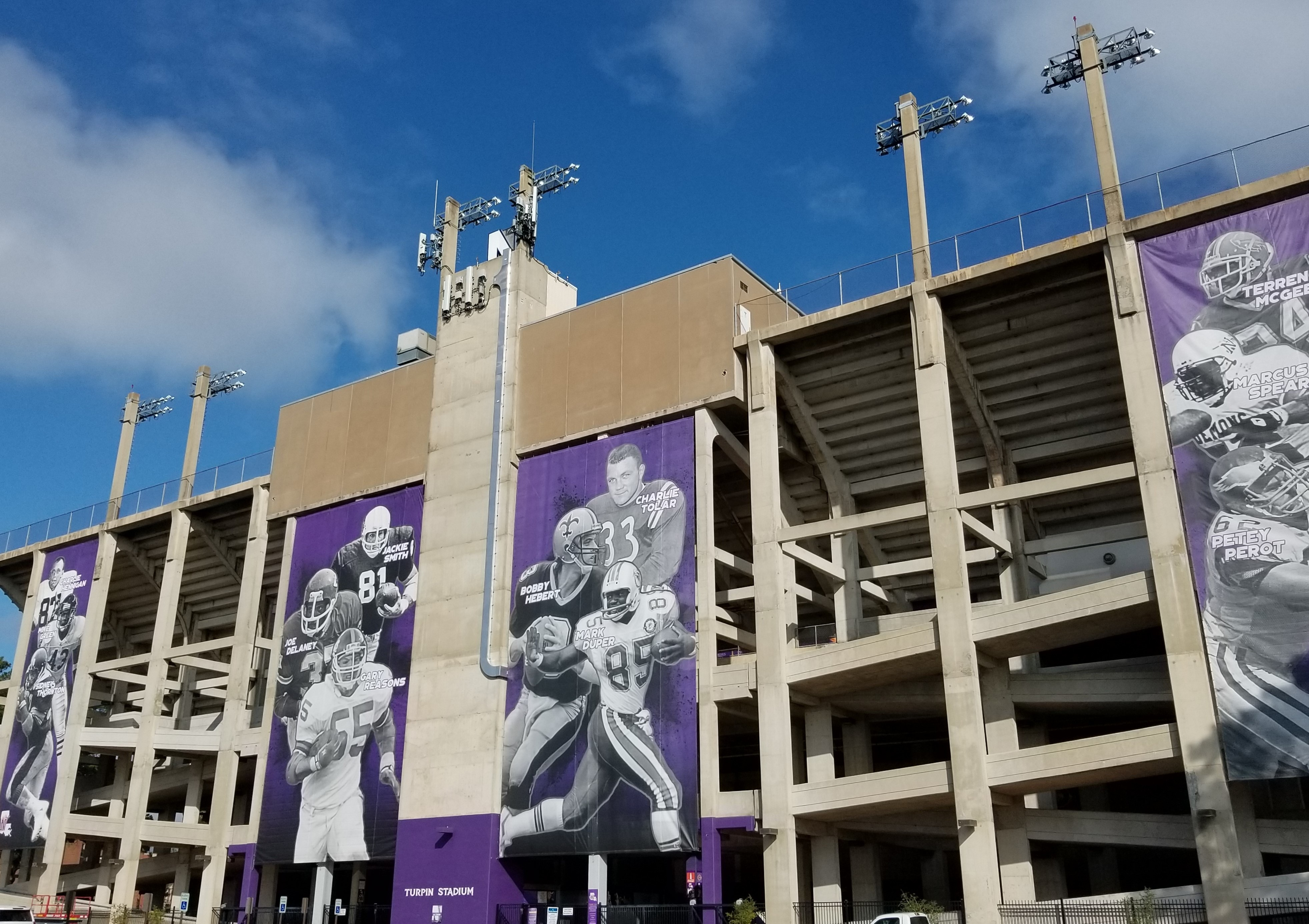
Turpin Stadium-exterior

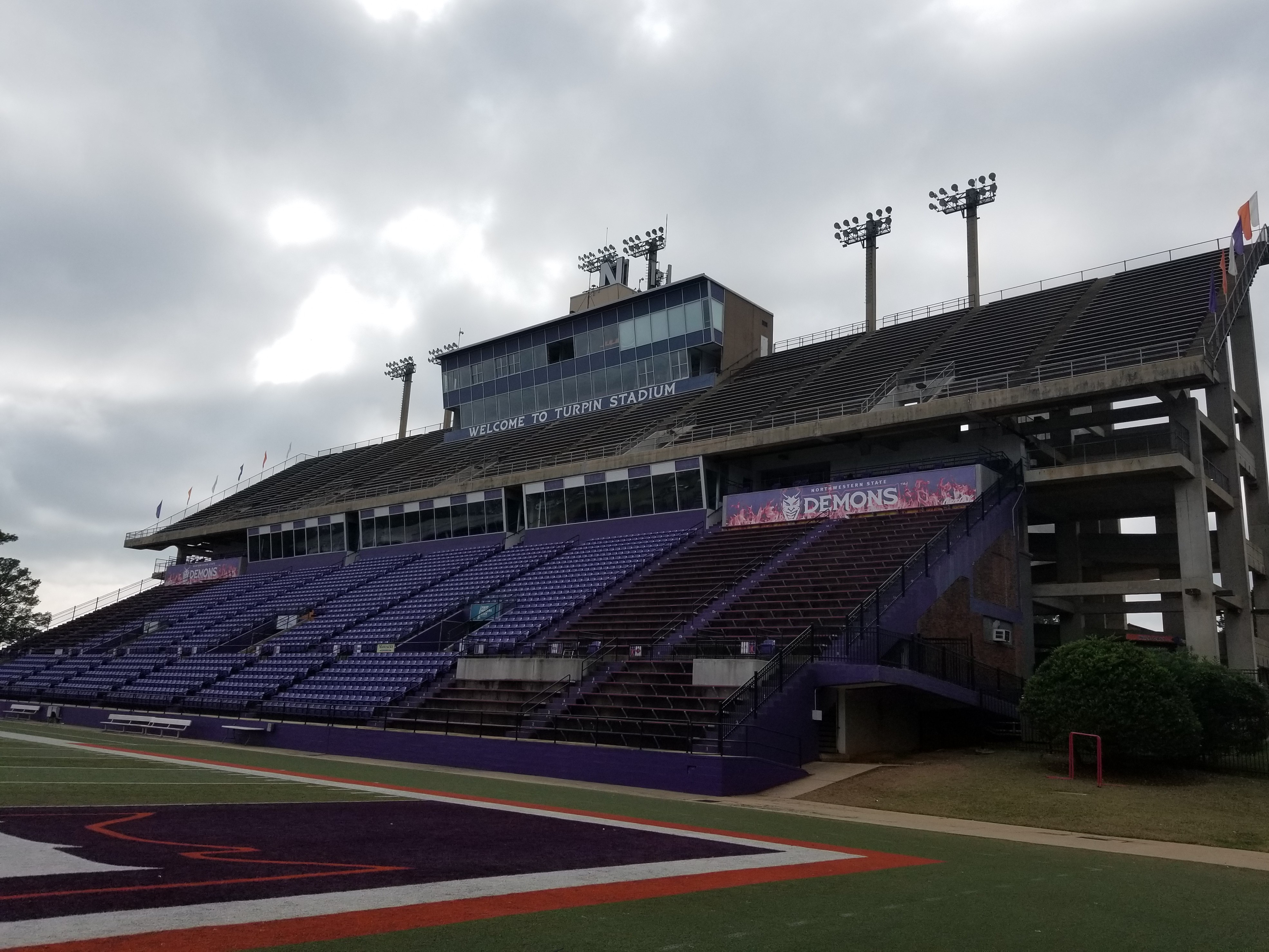
Turpin Stadium-home stands and press box

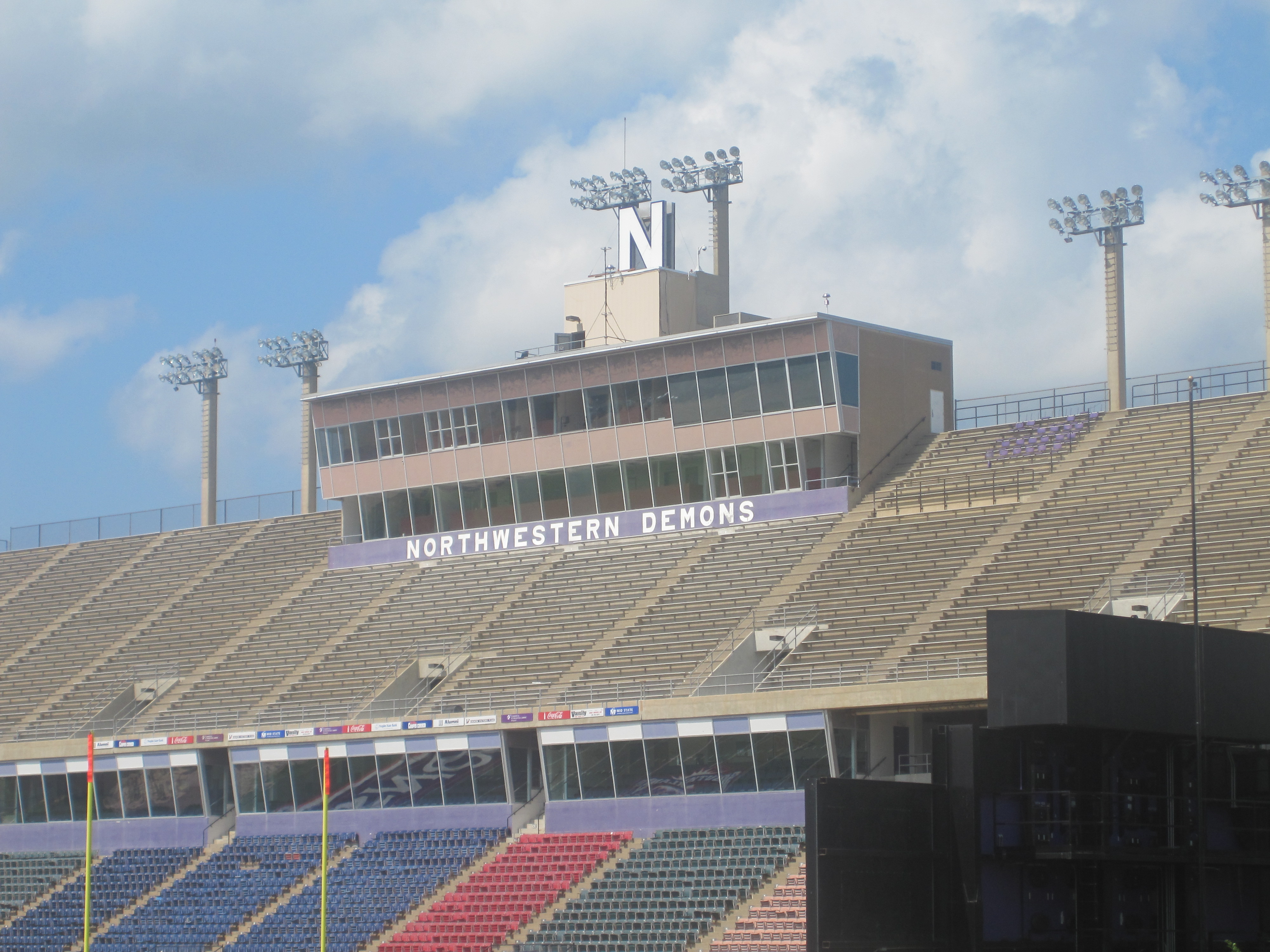
Turpin Stadium-home stands and press box with scoreboard

== See also ==
- List of NCAA Division I FCS football stadiums
