= 2012 Lamar Cardinals football team =

American college football season

2012 Lamar Cardinals football
- Conference: Southland Conference
- Record: 4–8 (1–6 Southland)
- Head coach: Ray Woodard (3rd season)
- Offensive coordinator: Larry Kueck (1st season)
- Offensive scheme: Multiple
- Defensive coordinator: Bill Bradley (1st season)
- Base defense: 3–4
- Home stadium: Provost Umphrey Stadium

2012 Southland Conference football standings
| | Conf. | | | Overall |
| Team | W | | L | W | | L |
|---|---|---|---|---|---|---|
| No. 10 Central Arkansas +^ | 6 | – | 1 | 9 | – | 3 |
| No. 2 Sam Houston State +^ | 6 | – | 1 | 11 | – | 4 |
| Southeastern Louisiana | 5 | – | 2 | 5 | – | 6 |
| McNeese State | 4 | – | 3 | 7 | – | 4 |
| Stephen F. Austin | 4 | – | 3 | 5 | – | 6 |
| Northwestern State | 2 | – | 5 | 4 | – | 7 |
| Lamar | 1 | – | 6 | 4 | – | 8 |
| Nicholls State | 0 | – | 7 | 1 | – | 10 |
+ – Conference co-champions; ^ – FCS playoff participant; Rankings from The Sports Network poll

The 2012 Lamar Cardinals football team represented Lamar University in the 2012 NCAA Division I FCS football season. The Cardinals were led by third-year head coach Ray Woodard and played their home games at Provost Umphrey Stadium. They were a member of the Southland Conference. They finished the season 4–8, 1–6 in Southland play to finish in seventh place.

== Media ==
All Cardinals football games will be broadcast on KLVI AM 560 as part of the Lamar Cardinals Radio Network. At least 3 games, including 2 road games, will be broadcast on Fox 4 KBTV as the Cardinals complete the third year of a five-year deal granting exclusive broadcast rights to select Cardinals games to KBTV. SLC TV could cover 1 or 2 games minimum in addition to the KBTV games. Cardinals SLC TV games will air locally on KUIL-LD.

== Before the season ==
=== 2012 recruits ===
Lamar signed 21 players on national letter of intent day. Four additional college recruits signed on previously, in December 2011, to bring the recruiting class to 25-members strong. On May 11, Lamar gained another player from Tyler Jr. College to bring the squad up to 26 new members. In June Lamar gained 4 transfers, 2 from Oklahoma State and 2 from various junior colleges. Because 3 of the 4 redshirted last season and the fourth was a JC transfer, all 4 will be eligible to play in the 2012 season. It brings the Lamar recruiting class up t 30 for 2012. Recruits are listed here. Player profiles for each recruit are available at the signing day link below.

College recruiting information (2012)
| Name | Hometown | School | Height | Weight | Commit date |
|---|---|---|---|---|---|
| Jacory Augustine; DB | Lake Charles, LA | LaGrange | 6 ft 3 in (1.91 m) | 190 lb (86 kg) | |
| Jacory Augustine; DB | Recruit ratings: No ratings found | | | | |
| Alex Ball; K | Westlake Village, CA | Westlake Village | 6 ft 3 in (1.91 m) | 210 lb (95 kg) | |
| Alex Ball; K | Recruit ratings: No ratings found | | | | |
| Garrett Baxley; OL | Kingwood, TX | Kingwood Park | 6 ft 5 in (1.96 m) | 245 lb (111 kg) | |
| Garrett Baxley; OL | Recruit ratings: No ratings found | | | | |
| Matthew Bergeron; QB | Mandeville, LA | Mandeville | 5 ft 11 in (1.80 m) | 175 lb (79 kg) | |
| Matthew Bergeron; QB | Recruit ratings: No ratings found | | | | |
| Xavier Bethany; DB | Burton, TX | Burton | 6 ft 1 in (1.85 m) | 185 lb (84 kg) | |
| Xavier Bethany; DB | Recruit ratings: No ratings found | | | | |
| Jermaine Bowman; OL | Beaumont, TX | West Brook | 6 ft 1 in (1.85 m) | 300 lb (140 kg) | |
| Jermaine Bowman; OL | Recruit ratings: No ratings found | | | | |
| Luke Campbell; OL | Rusk, TX | Rusk | 6 ft 5 in (1.96 m) | 285 lb (129 kg) | |
| Luke Campbell; OL | Recruit ratings: No ratings found | | | | |
| Corbin Carr; DL | Nederland, TX | Nederland | 6 ft 3 in (1.91 m) | 235 lb (107 kg) | |
| Corbin Carr; DL | Recruit ratings: No ratings found | | | | |
| Garrett Drake; WR | Silsbee, TX | Silsbee | 6 ft 2 in (1.88 m) | 185 lb (84 kg) | |
| Garrett Drake; WR | Recruit ratings: No ratings found | | | | |
| Gratlin Gladney; WR | Houston, TX | Cypress Falls | 5 ft 10 in (1.78 m) | 180 lb (82 kg) | |
| Gratlin Gladney; WR | Recruit ratings: No ratings found | | | | |
| Michael Handy; Ath | Conroe, TX | Oak Ridge | 5 ft 11 in (1.80 m) | 190 lb (86 kg) | |
| Michael Handy; Ath | Recruit ratings: No ratings found | | | | |
| Mike Hargis; DL | Austin, TX | Manor | 6 ft 3 in (1.91 m) | 220 lb (100 kg) | |
| Mike Hargis; DL | Recruit ratings: No ratings found | | | | |
| David Hollyfield; DL | Silsbee, TX | Silsbee | 6 ft 2 in (1.88 m) | 230 lb (100 kg) | |
| David Hollyfield; DL | Recruit ratings: No ratings found | | | | |
| Ronnie Jones, Jr. LB | Hempstead, TX | Hempstead | 5 ft 11 in (1.80 m) | 220 lb (100 kg) | |
| Ronnie Jones, Jr. LB | Recruit ratings: No ratings found | | | | |
| Jayce Nelson; WR | Port Neches, TX | Port Neches-Groves | 6 ft 2 in (1.88 m) | 170 lb (77 kg) | |
| Jayce Nelson; WR | Recruit ratings: No ratings found | | | | |
| Joe Persohn; OL | Sour Lake, TX | Hardin-Jefferson | 6 ft 3 in (1.91 m) | 220 lb (100 kg) | |
| Joe Persohn; OL | Recruit ratings: No ratings found | | | | |
| Desmond Richards; RB | Montgomery, TX | Magnolia West | 5 ft 10 in (1.78 m) | 180 lb (82 kg) | |
| Desmond Richards; RB | Recruit ratings: No ratings found | | | | |
| Courtlin Thompson; DB | Lancaster, CA | Antelope Valley Christian; Saddleback CC | 6 ft 1 in (1.85 m) | 225 lb (102 kg) | |
| Courtlin Thompson; DB | Recruit ratings: No ratings found | | | | |
| Bret Treadway; OL | Silsbee, TX | Silsbee | 6 ft 2 in (1.88 m) | 245 lb (111 kg) | |
| Bret Treadway; OL | Recruit ratings: No ratings found | | | | |
| Cam Washington; RB | Corsicana, TX | Corsicana | 5 ft 11 in (1.80 m) | 190 lb (86 kg) | |
| Cam Washington; RB | Recruit ratings: No ratings found | | | | |
| Darryl Waters; LB | Norfolk, VA | Maury; Hargrave Military Academy | 6 ft 3 in (1.91 m) | 230 lb (100 kg) | |
| Darryl Waters; LB | Recruit ratings: No ratings found | | | | |
| Nashon Davis; DB | Katy, TX | Morton Ranch; Blinn College | 6 ft 3 in (1.91 m) | 203 lb (92 kg) | |
| Nashon Davis; DB | Recruit ratings: No ratings found | | | | |
| Jermaine Longino; LB | Houston, TX | Hightower; Trinity Valley CC | 5 ft 10 in (1.78 m) | 220 lb (100 kg) | |
| Jermaine Longino; LB | Recruit ratings: No ratings found | | | | |
| Tyrus McGlothen; DB | Grand Prairie, TX | South Grand Prairie; Cisco CC | 5 ft 8 in (1.73 m) | 180 lb (82 kg) | |
| Tyrus McGlothen; DB | Recruit ratings: No ratings found | | | | |
| Ryan Mossakowski; QB | Frisco, TX | Centennial; Northwest Mississippi CC | 6 ft 4 in (1.93 m) | 225 lb (102 kg) | |
| Ryan Mossakowski; QB | Recruit ratings: No ratings found | | | | |
| Brock Wempa; OL | Royse City, TX | Royse City; Tyler | 6 ft 2 in (1.88 m) | 310 lb (140 kg) | |
| Brock Wempa; OL | Recruit ratings: No ratings found | | | | |
| Kevin Johnson; WR | Houston, TX | Cypress Ridge; Oklahoma State | 6 ft 1 in (1.85 m) | 195 lb (88 kg) | Jun 5, 2012 |
| Kevin Johnson; WR | Recruit ratings: Scout: Rivals: (TR) | | | | |
| Joe Okafor; DL | Bellaire, TX | Bellaire; Oklahoma State | 6 ft 6 in (1.98 m) | 295 lb (134 kg) | Jun 5, 2012 |
| Joe Okafor; DL | Recruit ratings: Scout: Rivals: (TR) | | | | |
| Oluwajimi (B.J.) Oyefeso; WR | Pasadena, CA | Roland; Citrus | 6 ft 3 in (1.91 m) | 205 lb (93 kg) | Jun 19, 2012 |
| Oluwajimi (B.J.) Oyefeso; WR | Recruit ratings: Scout: Rivals: (JC) | | | | |
| Dillon Barrett; QB | Dry Prong, LA | Grant; Fort Scott | 6 ft 5 in (1.96 m) | 220 lb (100 kg) | Jun 19, 2012 |
| Dillon Barrett; QB | Recruit ratings: Scout: Rivals: (JC) | | | | |
Overall recruit ranking: Scout: Not Ranked Rivals: Not Ranked ESPN: Not Ranked
Note: In many cases, Scout, Rivals, 247Sports, On3, and ESPN may conflict in their listings of height and weight.; In these cases, the average was taken. ESPN grades are on a 100-point scale.; Sources: "2012 Player Commitments - Lamar". ESPN.; "2012 Team Ranking". Rivals.com.

=== 2nd Crawfish Bowl ===
The 2nd Annual Red-White Crayfish Bowl was held Saturday, May 17 at 7 PM. The team was divided into a red and white team, and 4 12-minute quarters were played.

2012 Crawfish Bowl

| Team | 1 | 2 | 3 | 4 | OT | Total |
|---|---|---|---|---|---|---|
| Red | 0 | 0 | 0 | 0 | 0 | 0 |
| • White | 0 | 0 | 0 | 0 | 7 | 7 |

- Date: April 17
- Location: Provost Umphrey Stadium
  Beaumont, TX
- Game start: 7:00 PM CST
- Elapsed time: 2:20

Scoring summary
| OT | 0:00 | White | Zach Sonnier 6-yard touchdown pass from Ry Mossakowski (Justin Stout kick) | White 7-0 |

The Crawfish Bowl would need overtime to decide the winner. Both the red and white teams struggled to move the ball in different ways. The Red team only netted 6 yards rushing on 18 attempts. The white team pounded out 58-yards rushing with just one person, the returning medical redshirted DePauldrick Garrett. On the other hand, the white team owned the skies as they outgained the red team 155 to 79. Due to an imbalance in the number of quarterbacks, Caleb Berry would play for both teams. He would leave the game as the leading passer going 15-for-25 for 138 yards. Counterpart Jeremy Johnson would go 7-for-17 for 55 yards, but he also had 1 interception. Mossakowski had the fewest passing yards, with only 41 yards passing, but he also had the only touchdown.

The Red team had a chance to even the game up, but Mike Venson fumbled the ball on second down to secure the win for the white squad.

Defense dominated the game on both sides of the ball. Joe Viator, of the white team, led all players with 8 tackles. James Washington had five tackles and one sack for the white team, and Marcus Malbrough wasn't far behind with 4 tackles, 1 sack, 1.5 tackles for loss, and a quarterback hurry.

For the red squad Adren Dorsey led the team with two sacks. Keinon Peterson had six tackles, and Eric Arnold and Mark Murrill each had a sack.

There was only one scoring opportunity prior to the fourth quarter. Berry completed a pair of passes to Payton Ploch and one to Kyle hildreth to move the ball to the white teams 23-yard line. After the drive stalled Juventino Sanchez would try a 43-yard field goal which ended short. The red-team again drove deep into white territory on the final drive of regulation, but Sanchez missed a 42-yard field goal to end regulation.

Perhaps the highlight of the night came from Punter Kolin Kahler played for both teams and was on the field 13 times. He averaged 42.4 yards per punt for the white team and 40-yards per punt for the red-team. His longest punt came in at 56 yards, and 3 of the punts forced the opposing team to start inside the 20.

== Roster ==
2012 Lamar Cardinals football team roster
Players
Coaches
Offense

| Pos. | # | Name | Class |
|---|---|---|---|
| QB | 12 | Caleb Berry | So |
| QB | 5 | Ryan Mossakowski | Jr |
| QB | x | Dillon Barrett | Fr |
| QB | x | Matt Bergeron | Fr |
| RB | 8 | Mike Venson | Jr |
| RB | 14 | DePauldrick Garrett | Jr |
| RB | 22 | Desmond Richards | Fr |
| RB | 27 | Caleb Harmon | Jr |
| RB | x | Darrell Harris | Fr |
| TE | 24 | Jacob Hanna | Jr |
| TE | 47 | P. J. Henderson | Jr |
| TE | 80 | Cory Soto | Jr |
| TE | 88 | Payden McVea | So |
| WR | 82 | Reggie Begelton | Fr |
| WR | x | Garrett Drake | Fr |
| WR | 86 | Jordan Edwards | Jr |
| WR | x | Kelechi Ejekam | Fr |
| WR | 3 | Barry Ford | Jr |
| WR | 83 | VanLawrance Franks | Sr |
| WR | 25 | Gratian Gladney | Fr |
| WR | 20 | Michael Handy | Fr |
| WR | 13 | Kye Hildreth | Jr |
| WR | 11 | Kevin Johnson | So |
| WR | 84 | Jayce Nelson | Fr |
| WR | 15 | Oluwajimi Oyefoso | Jr |
| WR | x | Zach Sonnier | Fr |
| WR | 38 | Jesse Sparks | So |

Defense

| Pos. | # | Name | Class |
|---|---|---|---|
| DE | 5 | Marcus Malbrough | Sr |
| DE | 57 | Jeremy Kirt | Jr |
| DE | 93 | Jesse Dickson | Jr |

Special teams

| Pos. | # | Name | Class |
|---|---|---|---|
| PK | 31 | Juventino Sanchez | Sr |
| PK | 39 | Justin Stout | Jr |
| PK | 46 | Alex Ball | Fr |
| PK, P | 25 | Kollin Kahler | Jr |
| DS | 43 | Chris Maikranz | Jr |
| DS | 48 | Lawson Hartwick | So |

Head coach

- Ray Woodard (Texas)

Coordinators/assistant coaches

- Allen Johnson (East Texas A&M)
  Asst. head coach/secondary
- Bill Bradley (Texas)
  Defensive coordinator
- Larry Kueck (Stephen F. Austin)
  Offensive coordinator
- Carey Bailey (Tennessee)
  Defensive line
- Kevin Barbay (Lamar)
  Wide receivers
- James Brown (Texas)
  Running backs
- Craig McGallion (Houston)
  Recruiting coordinator/linebackers
- Dennis McKnight (Drake)
  Offensive line/special teams
- Marcus Carver (Army)
  Graduate asst. coach/defensive line
- Chuck Langston (Oklahoma)
  Director of football operations
- Brett Ramsey (Lamar)
  Graduate asst. coach/tight ends

Legend

- (C) Team captain
- (S) Suspended
- (I) Ineligible
- Injured
- Redshirt

Roster

== Schedule ==
| Date | Time | Opponent | Site | TV | Result | Attendance |
|---|---|---|---|---|---|---|
| September 1 | 6:00 pm | at Louisiana–Lafayette* | Cajun Field; Lafayette, LA (Sabine Shoe) | Rajun Cajuns Network/ESPN3 | L 0–40 | 25,803 |
| September 8 | 7:00 pm | Prairie View A&M* | Provost Umphrey Stadium; Beaumont, TX | | W 31–0 | 15,367 |
| September 15 | 11:00 pm | at Hawaiʻi* | Aloha Stadium; Honoloulu, HI | KBTV | L 2–54 | 31,442 |
| September 22 | 7:00 pm | Langston* | Provost Umphrey Stadium; Beaumont, TX | KBTV/ESPN3 | W 31–0 | 12,383 |
| September 29 | 3:00 pm | Southeastern Louisiana | Provost Umphrey Stadium; Beaumont, TX | SLC TV | L 21–31 | 8,426 |
| October 6 | 6:00 pm | at Northwestern State | Harry Turpin Stadium; Natchitoches, LA | KBTV/ESPN3 | L 23–30 | 8,357 |
| October 13 | 3:00 pm | McMurry*^{†} | Provost Umphrey Stadium; Beaumont, TX | | W 52–21 | 13,452 |
| October 20 | 6:00 pm | at No. 19 Central Arkansas | Estes Stadium; Conway, AR | | L 14–24 | 9,374 |
| October 27 | 3:00 pm | No. 5 Sam Houston State | Provost Umphrey Stadium; Beaumont, TX | SLC TV | L 7–56 | 9,042 |
| November 3 | 6:00 pm | at Stephen F. Austin | Homer Bryce Stadium; Nacogdoches, TX | | L 26–40 | 4,421 |
| November 10 | 3:00 pm | Nicholls State | Provost Umphrey Stadium; Beaumont, TX | | W 34–24 | 8,043 |
| November 17 | 7:00 pm | at McNeese State | Cowboy Stadium; Lake Charles, LA (Battle of the Border) | | L 0–35 | 11,235 |
*Non-conference game; ^{†}Homecoming; Rankings from The Sports Network Poll released prior to the game; All times are in Central time

== Game summaries ==
=== Louisiana-Lafayette ===
The Cardinals will open the season with an older rival in Louisiana as they meet the Ragin' Cajuns. The Rajin' Cajuns have dominated the series against the Cardinals 21-12 and are on a current 3 game winning streak against the Cardinals. The two schools compete for the Sabine Shoe trophy.

Lamar at Louisiana-Lafayette

| Team | 1 | 2 | 3 | 4 | Total |
|---|---|---|---|---|---|
| Cardinals | 0 | 0 | 0 | 0 | 0 |
| • Ragin' Cajuns | 13 | 27 | 0 | 0 | 40 |

- Date: September 1
- Location: Cajun Field
  Lafayette, LA
- Game start: 6:08 pm CST
- Elapsed time: 3:02
- Game attendance: 25,803
- Game weather: 83 °F (28 °C), Cloudy w/ Possible Rain, winds N at 1-3 mph
- Referee: Stan Sence
- TV announcers (ESPN3): Jeff Palermo, Scott Brazda, and Erin Cofiell

Scoring summary

| Quarter | Time | Drive | | | Team | Scoring information | Score | |
| Quarter | Time | Plays | Yards | TOP | Team | Scoring information | LAMAR | LA-LAFAYETTE |
|---|---|---|---|---|---|---|---|---|
| 1 | 13:04 | 5 | 23 | 1:56 | Louisiana-Lafayette | 53-yard field goal by Brett Baer | 0 | 3 |
| 1 | 9:29 | 6 | 29 | 3:35 | Louisiana-Lafayette | Jacob Maxwell 2-yard touchdown reception from Blaine Gautier, Brett Baer kick good | 0 | 10 |
| 1 | 6:05 | 4 | 2 | 1:02 | Louisiana-Lafayette | 40-yard field goal by Brett Baer | 0 | 13 |
| 2 | 14:56 | 7 | 28 | 3:37 | Louisiana-Lafayette | Alonzo Harris 1-yard touchdown run, Brett Baer kick good | 0 | 20 |
| 2 | 11:24 | 4 | 89 | 1:54 | Louisiana-Lafayette | Effrem Reed 2-yard touchdown run, Brett Baer kick good | 0 | 27 |
| 2 | 9:38 | 4 | 2 | 0:52 | Louisiana-Lafayette | 39-yard field goal by Brett Baer | 0 | 30 |
| 2 | 4:55 | 6 | 31 | 0:52 | Louisiana-Lafayette | 32-yard field goal by Brett Baer | 0 | 33 |
| 2 | 0:12 | 11 | 56 | 2:47 | Louisiana-Lafayette | Javone Lawson 2-yard touchdown reception from Blaine Gautier, Brett Baer kick good | 0 | 40 |
| "TOP" = time of possession. For other American football terms, see Glossary of American football. | | | | | | | | |

=== Prairie View A&M ===
The Cardinals open up their home slate with their first ever contest against fellow Texas University Prairie View A&M.

Prairie View A&M at Lamar

| Team | 1 | 2 | 3 | 4 | Total |
|---|---|---|---|---|---|
| Panthers | 0 | 0 | 0 | 0 | 0 |
| • Cardinals | 14 | 7 | 3 | 7 | 31 |

- Date: September 8
- Location: Provost Umphrey Stadium
  Beaumont, TX
- Game start: 7:00 pm CST
- Elapsed time: 2:46
- Game attendance: 15,367
- Game weather: 79 °F (26 °C), Overcast, winds NNW at 11mph
- Referee: Ross Smith
- TV announcers (Lamarcardinals.com): Harold Mann and Bo Brown

Scoring summary

| Quarter | Time | Drive | | | Team | Scoring information | Score | |
| Quarter | Time | Plays | Yards | TOP | Team | Scoring information | Prairie View A&M | LAMAR |
|---|---|---|---|---|---|---|---|---|
| 1 | 7:22 | 8 | 71 | 3:56 | Lamar | Kevin Johnson 11-yard touchdown reception from Ryan Mossakowski, Justin Stout kick good | 0 | 7 |
| 1 | 1:08 | 8 | 66 | 3:47 | Lamar | Kevin Johnson 8-yard touchdown reception from Ryan Mossakowski, Justin Stout kick good | 0 | 14 |
| 2 | 12:37 | 6 | 41 | 2:24 | Lamar | Kevin Johnson 12-yard touchdown run, Justin Stout kick good | 0 | 21 |
| 3 | 7:48 | 16 | 63 | 7:12 | Lamar | 29-yard field goal by Justin Stout | 0 | 24 |
| 4 | 5:29 | 7 | 74 | 3:27 | Lamar | Herschel Sims 4-yard touchdown run, Justin Stout kick good | 0 | 31 |
| "TOP" = time of possession. For other American football terms, see Glossary of American football. | | | | | | | 0 | 31 |

=== Hawaiʻi ===
The Cardinals return to FBS country for their first ever contest against the Warriors.

Lamar at Hawaiʻi

| Team | 1 | 2 | 3 | 4 | Total |
|---|---|---|---|---|---|
| Cardinals | 0 | 0 | 0 | 2 | 2 |
| • Warriors | 7 | 21 | 13 | 13 | 54 |

- Date: September 15
- Location: Aloha Stadium
  Honolulu, HI
- Game start: 11:08 pm CST
- Elapsed time: 3:00
- Game attendance: 31,442
- Game weather: 84 °F (29 °C), Mostly clear, winds E at 17mph
- Referee: David Alvarex
- TV announcers (KBTV): Robert Kekaula, Darnell Arceneaux, Lori Santi, and Dan Meisenzahl

Scoring summary

| Quarter | Time | Drive | | | Team | Scoring information | Score | |
| Quarter | Time | Plays | Yards | TOP | Team | Scoring information | LAMAR | HAWAIʻI |
|---|---|---|---|---|---|---|---|---|
| 1 | 9:25 | 1 | 16 | 0:04 | Hawaiʻi | Trevor Davis 16-yard touchdown reception from Sean Schroeder, Tyler Hadden kick good | 0 | 7 |
| 2 | 8:10 | 5 | 80 | 2:13 | Hawaiʻi | John Lister 7-yard touchdown run, Tyler Hadden kick good | 0 | 14 |
| 2 | 3:51 | 5 | 51 | 2:09 | Hawaiʻi | Darius Bright 8-yard touchdown reception from Sean Schroeder, Tyler Hadden kick good | 0 | 21 |
| 2 | 2:07 | | | | Hawaiʻi | Ne'Quan Phillips returns blocked punt 21 yards for a touchdown, Tyler Hadden kick good | 0 | 28 |
| 3 | 14:43 | | | | Hawaiʻi | Mike Edwards 95 yard kickoff return for a touchdown, Tyler Hadden kick good | 0 | 35 |
| 3 | 9:07 | 8 | 37 | 4:27 | Hawaiʻi | 32-yard field goal by Tyler Hadden | 0 | 38 |
| 3 | 8:10 | 4 | -1 | 0:49 | Hawaiʻi | 31-yard field goal by Tyler Hadden | 0 | 41 |
| 4 | 14:10 | 12 | 72 | 5:23 | Hawaiʻi | Chris Gant 9-yard touchdown reception from Sean Schroeder, Tyler Hadden kick good | 0 | 48 |
| 4 | 8:19 | 8 | 45 | 4:10 | Hawaiʻi and Lamar | John Lister 3-yard touchdown run, Tyler Hadden kick blocked, returned by Lamar's Adria Guillroy for 2 points | 2 | 54 |
| "TOP" = time of possession. For other American football terms, see Glossary of American football. | | | | | | | 2 | 54 |

=== Langston ===
The final tuneup before conference play will feature the first ever meeting between the Langston Lions and Lamar.

Langston at Lamar

| Team | 1 | 2 | 3 | 4 | Total |
|---|---|---|---|---|---|
| Lions | 0 | 0 | 0 | 0 | 0 |
| • Cardinals | 14 | 3 | 7 | 7 | 31 |

- Date: September 22
- Location: Provost Umphrey Stadium
  Beaumont, TX
- Game start: 7:00 pm CST
- Elapsed time: 2:53
- Game attendance: 12,383
- Game weather: 86 °F (30 °C), Clear, winds 2 mph
- Referee: Ross Smith
- TV announcers (KBTV/ESPN3): Charlie Jellin, Nick Canizales, and James Ware

Scoring summary

| Quarter | Time | Drive | | | Team | Scoring information | Score | |
| Quarter | Time | Plays | Yards | TOP | Team | Scoring information | LANGSTON | LAMAR |
|---|---|---|---|---|---|---|---|---|
| 1 | 14:24 | 2 | 23 | 0:36 | Lamar | Herschel Sims 4-yard touchdown run, Justin Stout kick good | 0 | 7 |
| 1 | 5:06 | 1 | 34 | 0:05 | Lamar | Kevin Johnson 34-yard touchdown reception from Ryan Mossakowski, Justin Stout kick good | 0 | 14 |
| 2 | 0:02 | 9 | 65 | 0:53 | Lamar | 37-yard field goal by Justin Stout | 0 | 17 |
| 3 | 10:07 | 6 | 51 | 3:07 | Lamar | Kevin Johnson 14-yard touchdown reception from Ryan Mossakowski, Justin Stout kick good | 0 | 24 |
| 4 | 11:00 | 9 | 71 | 5:07 | Lamar | Kevin Johnson 33-yard touchdown reception from Ryan Mossakowski, Justin Stout kick good | 0 | 31 |
| "TOP" = time of possession. For other American football terms, see Glossary of American football. | | | | | | | 0 | 31 |

=== Southeastern Louisiana ===
The Cardinals open conference play against the Lions. The Cardinals currently own a 3-1 advantage in the series

Southeastern Louisiana at Lamar

| Team | 1 | 2 | 3 | 4 | Total |
|---|---|---|---|---|---|
| • Lions | 7 | 7 | 10 | 7 | 31 |
| Cardinals | 0 | 7 | 7 | 7 | 21 |

- Date: September 29
- Location: Provost Umphrey Stadium
  Beaumont, TX
- Game start: 3:05 pm CST
- Elapsed time: 3:05
- Game attendance: 8,426
- Game weather: 76 °F (24 °C), Mostly Cloudy, winds E at 2 mph
- Referee: Buddy Gingras
- TV announcers (SLC TV): Randy McIlvoy, Shea Walker, and Brooke Bentley

Scoring summary

| Quarter | Time | Drive | | | Team | Scoring information | Score | |
| Quarter | Time | Plays | Yards | TOP | Team | Scoring information | SOUTHEASTERN LOUISIANA | LAMAR |
|---|---|---|---|---|---|---|---|---|
| 1 | 8:54 | 7 | 56 | 2:23 | Southeastern Louisiana | Michael Chaney 2-yard touchdown run, Seth Sebastian kick good | 7 | 0 |
| 2 | 13:44 | 7 | 51 | 3:11 | Southeastern Louisiana | Michael Chaney 4-yard touchdown run, Seth Sebastian kick good | 14 | 0 |
| 2 | 10:01 | 8 | 61 | 3:35 | Lamar | Payden McVey 8-yard touchdown reception from Ryan Mossakowski, Justin Stout kick good | 14 | 7 |
| 3 | 10:28 | 12 | 59 | 5:28 | Southeastern Louisiana | 26-yard field goal by Seth Sebastian | 17 | 7 |
| 3 | 7:40 | 6 | 75 | 2:43 | Lamar | Payden McVey 10-yard touchdown reception from Ryan Mossakowski, Justin Stout kick good | 17 | 14 |
| 3 | 5:27 | | | | Southeastern Louisiana | Robert Alford 75-yard punt return for a touchdown, Seth Sebastian kick good | 24 | 14 |
| 4 | 6:58 | 6 | 57 | 2:36 | Southeastern Louisiana | Blaine LeBlanc 3-yard touchdown reception from Nathan Stanley, Seth Sebastian kick good | 31 | 14 |
| 4 | 6:58 | | | | Lamar | Interception returned 96 yards for touchdown by Tyru McGlothen, Justin Stout kick good | 31 | 21 |
| "TOP" = time of possession. For other American football terms, see Glossary of American football. | | | | | | | 31 | 21 |

=== Northwestern State ===
Despite a 5-3 advantage in the overall series, the Cardinals will be seeking to prove they can compete with the Demons in this 2012 contest. The Demons won the revival game of this series in 2011 and have won 3 of the last 4.

Lamar at Northwestern State

| Team | 1 | 2 | 3 | 4 | Total |
|---|---|---|---|---|---|
| Cardinals | 0 | 7 | 10 | 6 | 23 |
| • Demons | 10 | 7 | 3 | 10 | 30 |

- Date: October 6
- Location: Harry Turpin Stadium
  Natchitoches, LA
- Game start: 6:00 pm CST
- Elapsed time: 3:21
- Game attendance: 8,357
- Referee: Ken Ray
- TV announcers (KBTV/ESPN3): Charlie Jellin, Nick Canizales, and James Ware

Scoring summary

| Quarter | Time | Drive | | | Team | Scoring information | Score | |
| Quarter | Time | Plays | Yards | TOP | Team | Scoring information | Lamar | Northwestern St. |
|---|---|---|---|---|---|---|---|---|
| 1 | 9:00 | 6 | 30 | 1:57 | Northwestern State | 40-yard field goal by John Shaughnessy | 0 | 3 |
| 1 | 4:01 | 2 | 28 | 0:40 | Northwestern State | Phillip Harvey 26-yard touchdown run, John Shaugnessy kick good | 0 | 10 |
| 2 | 4:45 | | | | Lamar | Fumble recovery returned 62 yards for touchdown by Jamaal Washington, Justin Stout kick good | 7 | 10 |
| 2 | 2:19 | 8 | 68 | 2:18 | Northwestern State | Tucker Nims 4-yard touchdown reception from Brad Henderson, John Shaugnessy kick good | 7 | 17 |
| 3 | 7:34 | 14 | 80 | 7:18 | Lamar | Kevin Johnson 27-yard touchdown reception from Caleb Berry, Justin Stout kick good | 14 | 17 |
| 3 | 4:45 | 7 | 39 | 2:43 | Northwestern State | 42-yard field goal by John Shaughnessy | 14 | 20 |
| 3 | 2:20 | 5 | 14 | 2:13 | Lamar | 28-yard field goal by Justin Stout | 17 | 20 |
| 4 | 6:46 | 2 | 5 | 0:42 | Northwestern State | Robert Walker 3-yard touchdown run, John Shaugnessy kick good | 17 | 27 |
| 4 | 3:00 | 6 | 10 | 2:00 | Northwestern State | 20-yard field goal by John Shaugnessy | 17 | 30 |
| 4 | 0:36 | 10 | 78 | 2:20 | Lamar | Jordan Edwards 8-yard touchdown reception from Caleb Berry, Justin Stout kick failed | 23 | 30 |
| "TOP" = time of possession. For other American football terms, see Glossary of American football. | | | | | | | 23 | 30 |

=== McMurry ===
The Cardinals return home for homecoming on October 20. It will be the final non-conference tilt of the year (not counting the playoffs) and they will celebrate homecoming in this contest against the War Hawks, who are celebrating their first year in the Division 2 level. It will be the third meeting between the Cardinals and War Hawks, with the previous two having come in 1953 and 1954. Currently the series is split 1-1.

McMurry at Lamar

| Team | 1 | 2 | 3 | 4 | Total |
|---|---|---|---|---|---|
| War Hawks | 3 | 0 | 3 | 15 | 21 |
| • Cardinals | 10 | 21 | 14 | 7 | 52 |

- Date: October 13
- Location: Homer Bryce Stadium
  Nacogdoches, TX
- Game start: 7:05 PM CST
- Elapsed time: 3:11
- Game attendance: 13,452
- Game weather: 76 °F (24 °C), Cloudy, winds SSE 12 mph
- Referee: Brian Alos
- TV announcers (Lamarcardinals.com): Harold Mann and Bo Brown

Scoring summary

| Quarter | Time | Drive | | | Team | Scoring information | Score | |
| Quarter | Time | Plays | Yards | TOP | Team | Scoring information | McMurry | Lamar |
|---|---|---|---|---|---|---|---|---|
| 1 | 11:30 | 9 | 53 | 3:30 | McMurry | 40-yard field goal by Josh King | 3 | 0 |
| 1 | 11:16 | | | | Lamar | Kevin Johnson 88-yard kickoff return, Justin Stout kick good | 3 | 7 |
| 1 | 2:36 | 12 | 44 | 5:35 | Lamar | 41-yard field goal by Justin Stout | 3 | 10 |
| 2 | 12:40 | 2 | 13 | 0:11 | Lamar | Kevin Johnson 11-yard touchdown reception from Caleb Berry, Justin Stout kick good | 3 | 17 |
| 2 | 4:07 | 8 | 65 | 3:47 | Lamar | Kevin Johnson 13-yard touchdown reception from Caleb Berry, Justin Stout kick good | 3 | 24 |
| 2 | 0:04 | 8 | 48 | 0:59 | Lamar | Kevin Johnson 9-yard touchdown reception from Caleb Berry, Justin Stout kick good | 3 | 31 |
| 3 | 8:19 | 12 | 45 | 3:48 | McMurry | 35-yard field goal by Josh King | 6 | 31 |
| 3 | 7:02 | 3 | 48 | 1:09 | Lamar | DePaul Garrett 35-yard touchdown run, Justin Stout kick good | 6 | 38 |
| 3 | 1:02 | 7 | 60 | 2:58 | Lamar | Darrell Harris 8-yard touchdown run, Justin Stout kick good | 6 | 45 |
| 4 | 7:26 | | | | Lamar | Interception returned 53 yards for touchdown by Branden Thomas, Justni Stout kick good | 6 | 52 |
| 4 | 3:18 | 11 | 90 | 4:02 | McMurry | Chris Simpson 8-yard touchdown run, Cory Foust kick good | 13 | 52 |
| 4 | 0:29 | 8 | 47 | 2:45 | McMurry | Barrett Cain 18-yard touchdown reception from Brady Lambert, 2-point Brady Lambert run good | 21 | 52 |
| "TOP" = time of possession. For other American football terms, see Glossary of American football. | | | | | | | 21 | 52 |

=== Central Arkansas ===
The Cardinals head to Conway, Arkansas for the second match against their SLC rival, the Bears. Currently Central Arkansas leads the series 1-0.

Lamar at #17 Central Arkansas

| Team | 1 | 2 | 3 | 4 | Total |
|---|---|---|---|---|---|
| Cardinals | 0 | 0 | 7 | 7 | 14 |
| • #17 Bears | 0 | 17 | 0 | 7 | 24 |

- Date: October 20
- Location: Estes Stadium
  Conway, AR
- Game start: 6:00 PM CST
- Elapsed time: 2:35
- Game attendance: 9,374
- Referee: Buddy Gingras
- TV announcers (UCA Gameday): Justin Acri

Scoring summary

| Quarter | Time | Drive | | | Team | Scoring information | Score | |
| Quarter | Time | Plays | Yards | TOP | Team | Scoring information | Lamar | C. Arkansas |
|---|---|---|---|---|---|---|---|---|
| 2 | 14:57 | 12 | 86 | 5:58 | Central Arkansas | Jacoby Walker 1-yard touchdown run, Eddie Camara kick good | 0 | 7 |
| 2 | 2:14 | 11 | 46 | 4:22 | Central Arkansas | 33-yard field goal by Eddie Camara | 0 | 10 |
| 2 | 0:38 | 8 | 48 | 1:00 | Central Arkansas | Dominique Croom 19-yard touchdown reception from Wynri Smothers, Eddie Camara kick good | 0 | 17 |
| 3 | 1:51 | 14 | 74 | 7:21 | Lamar | Caleb Berry 7-yard touchdown run, Justin Stout kick good | 7 | 17 |
| 4 | 10:00 | 2 | 76 | 0:47 | Central Arkansas | Jesse Grandy 75-yard touchdown reception from Wynri Smothers, Eddie Camara kick good | 7 | 24 |
| 4 | 1:18 | 16 | 67 | 8:35 | Lamar | DePaul Garrett 4-yard touchdown run, Justin Stout kick good | 14 | 24 |
| "TOP" = time of possession. For other American football terms, see Glossary of American football. | | | | | | | 14 | 24 |

=== Sam Houston State ===
The 19th meeting between the Cardinals and the Bearkats gives Sam Houston State back-to-back games in the state of Texas. The Bearkats own a 10-7-1 series advantage with most of the success having occurred in recent years, having won 7 of the last 8 meetings.

Sam Houston State at Lamar

| Team | 1 | 2 | Total |
|---|---|---|---|
| Bearkats | | | 0 |
| Cardinals | | | 0 |

- Date: October 27
- Location: Provost Umphrey Stadium
  Beaumont, TX
- TV announcers (SLC TV): Randy McIlvoy, Shea Walker, and Brooke Bentley

Scoring summary

| Quarter | Time | Drive | | | Team | Scoring information | Score | |
| Quarter | Time | Plays | Yards | TOP | Team | Scoring information | SHSU | LAMAR |
|---|---|---|---|---|---|---|---|---|
| "TOP" = time of possession. For other American football terms, see Glossary of American football. | | | | | | | | |

=== Stephen F. Austin ===
The Lumberjacks have won four consecutive against the Cardinals and five of the last six meetings, but overall the Cardinals lead the series 18-10-2.

Lamar at Stephen F. Austin

| Team | 1 | 2 | Total |
|---|---|---|---|
| Lumberjacks | | | 0 |
| Lions | | | 0 |

- Date: November 3
- Location: Homer Bryce Stadium
  Nacogdoches, TX

Scoring summary

| Quarter | Time | Drive | | | Team | Scoring information | Score | |
| Quarter | Time | Plays | Yards | TOP | Team | Scoring information | LAMAR | SFA |
|---|---|---|---|---|---|---|---|---|
| "TOP" = time of possession. For other American football terms, see Glossary of American football. | | | | | | | | |

=== Nicholls State ===
The Cardinals and the Colonels go head-to-head in their 5th contest for the Cardinals final home game of the season. Currently the Cardinals lead the Colonels 3-1.

Nicholls State at Lamar

| Team | 1 | 2 | Total |
|---|---|---|---|
| Demons | | | 0 |
| Lumberjacks | | | 0 |

- Date: November 10
- Location: Provost Umphrey Stadium
  Beaumont, TX
- TV announcers (Lamarcardinals.com): Harold Mann and Bo Brown

Scoring summary

| Quarter | Time | Drive | | | Team | Scoring information | Score | |
| Quarter | Time | Plays | Yards | TOP | Team | Scoring information | NSU | LAMAR |
|---|---|---|---|---|---|---|---|---|
| "TOP" = time of possession. For other American football terms, see Glossary of American football. | | | | | | | | |

=== McNeese State ===
This Cardinals end the 2012 regular season by returning to Lake Charles to face the Cowboys. Overall this will be the 27th meeting between the two schools. The Cowboys lead the overall series 18-7-1, and the Cowboys have won 8 of the last 9 matches.

Lamar at McNeese State

| Team | 1 | 2 | Total |
|---|---|---|---|
| Cardinals | | | 0 |
| Cowboys | | | 0 |

- Date: November 17
- Location: Cowboy Stadium
  Lake Charles, LA

Scoring summary

| Quarter | Time | Drive | | | Team | Scoring information | Score | |
| Quarter | Time | Plays | Yards | TOP | Team | Scoring information | LAMAR | MSU |
|---|---|---|---|---|---|---|---|---|
| "TOP" = time of possession. For other American football terms, see Glossary of American football. | | | | | | | | |
