= 2012 Northwestern State Demons football team =

American college football season

2012 Northwestern State Demons football
- Conference: Southland Conference
- Record: 4–7 (2–5 Southland)
- Head coach: Bradley Dale Peveto (4th season)
- Offensive coordinator: Todd Cooley (4th season)
- Defensive coordinator: Gary DeLoach (1st season)
- Home stadium: Harry Turpin Stadium

2012 Southland Conference football standings
	Conf.			Overall
Team	W		L	W		L
No. 10 Central Arkansas +^	6	–	1	9	–	3
No. 2 Sam Houston State +^	6	–	1	11	–	4
Southeastern Louisiana	5	–	2	5	–	6
McNeese State	4	–	3	7	–	4
Stephen F. Austin	4	–	3	5	–	6
Northwestern State	2	–	5	4	–	7
Lamar	1	–	6	4	–	8
Nicholls State	0	–	7	1	–	10
+ – Conference co-champions; ^ – FCS playoff participant; Rankings from The Sports Network poll

The 2012 Northwestern State Demons football team represented Northwestern State University as a member of the Southland Conference during the 2012 NCAA Division I FCS football season. Led by Bradley Dale Peveto in his fourth and final season as head coach, the Demons compiled an overall record of 4–7 with a mark of 2–5 in conference play, placing sixth in the Southland. Northwestern State played home games at Harry Turpin Stadium in Natchitoches, Louisiana.

== Schedule ==
Date	Time	Opponent	Site	TV	Result	Attendance
September 1	6:00 pm	at Texas Tech*	Jones AT&T Stadium; Lubbock, TX	FSSW+, FCSP	L 6–44	50,236
September 8	6:00 pm	Arkansas–Monticello*	Harry Turpin Stadium; Natchitoches, LA		W 31–24	10,189
September 15	5:00 pm	at Nevada*	Mackay Stadium; Reno, NV		L 34–45	19,399
September 22	6:00 pm	Mississippi Valley State*	Harry Turpin Stadium; Natchitoches, LA		W 45–14	8,245
September 29	7:00 pm	at No. 24 McNeese State	Cowboy Stadium; Lake Charles, LA (rivalry)		L 22–30	10,532
October 6	6:00 pm	Lamar	Harry Turpin Stadium; Natchitoches, LA	ESPN3	W 30–23	8,357
October 13	3:00 pm	at Southeastern Louisiana	Strawberry Stadium; Hammond, LA (rivalry)	SLC TV	L 22–27	4,284
October 27	6:00 pm	Nicholls State^{†}	Harry Turpin Stadium; Natchitoches, LA (NSU Challenge)		W 27–26	9,749
November 3	7:00 pm	at No. 13 Central Arkansas	Estes Stadium; Conway, AR	SLC TV	L 14–35	11,579
November 10	6:00 pm	No. 3 Sam Houston State	Harry Turpin Stadium; Natchitoches, LA		L 17–52	7,256
November 17	6:00 pm	at Stephen F. Austin	Homer Bryce Stadium; Nacogdoches, TX (Chief Caddo)		L 17–34	8,341
*Non-conference game; ^{†}Homecoming; Rankings from The Sports Network Poll released prior to the game; All times are in Central time

== Game summaries ==
=== Texas Tech ===
Northwestern State opens the season with their second match against the Red Raiders. The previous match was in 2007, and Tech walked away with a 75–7 win.

Northwestern State at Texas Tech

Team	1	2	3	4	Total
Northwestern State Demons	0	3	0	3	6
• Texas Tech Red Raiders	7	17	3	17	44

- Date: September 1
- Location: Jones AT&T Stadium
  Lubbock, TX
- Game start: 6:07 CST
- Elapsed time: 3:21
- Game attendance: 50,236
- Game weather: 94 °F (34 °C), partly cloudy, winds S at 14 mph
- Referee: Alan Eck
- TV announcers (FSSW+
  FCSP): Bill Land, Dave Lapham, and Emily Jones

=== Arkansas–Monticello ===
Northwestern State heads home for the second game of the year where they play the Boll Weevils for the second time in school history. In the previous meeting in 2006 the Demons won 20–6.

Arkansas-Monticello at Northwestern State

Team	1	2	3	4	Total
Arkansas-Monticello Boll Weevils	14	3	7	0	24
• Northwestern State Demons	17	0	7	7	31

- Date: September 8
- Location: Harry Turpin Stadium
  Natchitoches, LA
- Game start: 6:00 PM CST
- Elapsed time: 3:10
- Game attendance: 10,189
- Referee: Ken Ray

=== Nevada ===
Northwestern State at Nevada

Team	1	2	3	4	Total
Northwestern State Demons	3	10	7	14	34
• Nevada Wolf Pack	7	10	14	14	45

- Date: September 15
- Location: Mackay Stadium
  Reno, NV
- Game start: 5:05 PM CST
- Elapsed time: 3:31
- Game attendance: 19,399
- Game weather: 88 °F (31 °C), Sunny and hot, winds WSW at 17mph
- Referee: Tom Walker

=== Mississippi Valley State ===
Mississippi Valley State at Northwestern State

Team	1	2	3	4	Total
Mississippi Valley State Delta Devils	7	0	7	0	14
• Northwestern State Demons	21	7	3	14	45

- Date: September 22
- Location: Harry Turpin Stadium
  Natchitoches, LA
- Game start: 6:00 PM CST
- Elapsed time: 2:51
- Game attendance: 8,245
- Referee: Marvel July

=== McNeese State ===
Northwestern State at McNeese State

Team	1	2	3	4	Total
Northwestern State Demons	0	0	14	8	22
• McNeese State Cowboys	7	10	3	10	30

- Date: September 29
- Location: Cowboy Stadium
  Lake Charles, LA
- Game start: 7:00 PM CST
- Elapsed time: 3:03
- Game attendance: 10,532
- Game weather: 78 °F (26 °C), cloudy, winds ESE at 5mph
- Referee: Ross Smith

=== Lamar ===
Lamar at Northwestern State

Team	1	2	3	4	Total
Lamar Cardinals	0	7	10	6	23
• Northwestern State Demons	10	7	3	10	30

- Date: October 6
- Location: Harry Turpin Stadium
  Natchitoches, LA
- Game start: 6:00 PM CST
- Elapsed time: 3:21
- Game attendance: 8,357
- Referee: Ken Ray
- TV announcers (ESPN3): Charlie Jellin, Nick Canizales, and James Ware

=== Southeastern Louisiana ===
Northwestern State at Southeastern Louisiana

Team	1	2	3	4	Total
Northwestern State Demons	3	6	6	7	22
• Southeastern Louisiana Lions	7	10	10	0	27

- Date: October 13
- Location: Strawberry Stadium
  Hammond, LA
- Game start: 3:05 PM CST
- Elapsed time: 3:12
- Game attendance: 4,284
- Game weather: 84 °F (29 °C), partly cloudy, winds SSE at 11 mph
- Referee: Buddy Gingras
- TV announcers (SLC TV): Randy McIlvoy, Shea Walker, and Erin Cofiell

=== Nicholls State ===
Nicholls State at Northwestern State

Team	1	2	3	4	Total
Nicholls State Colonels	9	10	7	0	26
• Northwestern State Demons	14	7	0	6	27

- Date: October 27
- Location: Harry Turpin Stadium
  Natchitoches, LA

Scoring summary

Quarter	Time	Drive			Team	Scoring information	Score	
Quarter	Time	Plays	Yards	TOP	Team	Scoring information	NSU	NWST
"TOP" = time of possession. For other American football terms, see Glossary of American football.								

=== Central Arkansas ===
Northwestern State at Central Arkansas

Team	1	2	3	4	Total
Northwestern State Demons	7	7	0	0	14
• Central Arkansas Bears	14	14	7	0	35

- Date: November 3
- Location: Estes Stadium
  Conway, AR
- TV announcers (SLC TV): Randy McIlvoy, Shea Walker, and Brooke Bentley

Scoring summary

Quarter	Time	Drive			Team	Scoring information	Score	
Quarter	Time	Plays	Yards	TOP	Team	Scoring information	NWST	CAU
"TOP" = time of possession. For other American football terms, see Glossary of American football.								

=== Sam Houston State ===
Sam Houston State at Northwestern State

Team	1	2	3	4	Total
• Sam Houston State Bearkats	7	31	7	7	52
Northwestern State Demons	7	3	0	7	17

- Date: November 10
- Location: Harry Turpin Stadium
  Natchitoches, LA

Scoring summary

Quarter	Time	Drive			Team	Scoring information	Score	
Quarter	Time	Plays	Yards	TOP	Team	Scoring information	SHSU	NWST
"TOP" = time of possession. For other American football terms, see Glossary of American football.								

=== Stephen F. Austin ===
Northwestern State at Stephen F. Austin

Team	1	2	3	4	Total
Northwestern State Demons	3	7	7	0	17
• Stephen F. Austin Lumberjacks	10	0	7	17	34

- Date: November 17
- Location: Homer Bryce Stadium
  Nacogdoches, TX

Scoring summary

Quarter	Time	Drive			Team	Scoring information	Score	
Quarter	Time	Plays	Yards	TOP	Team	Scoring information	NWST	SFA
"TOP" = time of possession. For other American football terms, see Glossary of American football.								

== Media ==
All games aired on the radio via the Demon Sports Network, found on KNWD and online at nsudemons.com.
