= 2012 Central Arkansas Bears football team =

American college football season

2012 Central Arkansas Bears football

Southland co-champion

FCS Playoffs Second Round, L 16–24 vs. Georgia Southern
- Conference: Southland Conference

Ranking
- Sports Network: No. 10
- FCS Coaches: No. 10
- Record: 9–3 (6–1 Southland)
- Head coach: Clint Conque (13th season)
- Offensive coordinator: Brooks Hollingsworth (9th season)
- Defensive coordinator: Matt Williamson (3rd season)
- Home stadium: Estes Stadium

2012 Southland Conference football standings
	Conf.			Overall
Team	W		L	W		L
No. 10 Central Arkansas +^	6	–	1	9	–	3
No. 2 Sam Houston State +^	6	–	1	11	–	4
Southeastern Louisiana	5	–	2	5	–	6
McNeese State	4	–	3	7	–	4
Stephen F. Austin	4	–	3	5	–	6
Northwestern State	2	–	5	4	–	7
Lamar	1	–	6	4	–	8
Nicholls State	0	–	7	1	–	10
+ – Conference co-champions; ^ – FCS playoff participant; Rankings from The Sports Network poll

The 2012 Central Arkansas Bears football team represented the University of Central Arkansas in the 2012 NCAA Division I FCS football season. The Bears were led by 13th year head coach Clint Conque and played their home games at Estes Stadium. They were a member of the Southland Conference. They finished the season 9–3, 6–1 in Southland play to share the conference championship with Sam Houston State. Due to their victory over Sam Houston State, the Bears received the Southland's automatic bid into the FCS Playoffs where they lost in the second round to Georgia Southern.

== Schedule ==
Date	Time	Opponent	Rank	Site	TV	Result	Attendance
September 1	6:00 pm	at Ole Miss*	No. 24	Vaught–Hemingway Stadium; Oxford, MS	CSS PPV	L 27–49	50,544
September 8	6:00 pm	at Murray State*	No. 25	Roy Stewart Stadium; Murray, KY	OVCDN	W 42–20	9,848
September 15	6:00 pm	Bacone*		Estes Stadium; Conway, AR		W 70–3	9,079
September 22	3:00 pm	No. 3 Sam Houston State	No. 25	Estes Stadium; Conway, AR	SLC TV	W 24–21	10,157
September 29	6:00 pm	at Stephen F. Austin	No. 16	Homer Bryce Stadium; Nacogdoches, TX		L 37–42	7,324
October 6	6:00 pm	Nicholls State	No. 24	Estes Stadium; Conway, AR		W 34–14	4,357
October 13	7:00 pm	at No. 19 McNeese State	No. 21	Cowboy Stadium; Lake Charles, LA (Red Beans and Rice Bowl)		W 27–26	12,913
October 20	6:00 pm	Lamar	No. 19	Estes Stadium; Conway, AR		W 24–14	9,374
October 27	7:00 pm	at Southeastern Louisiana	No. 14	Strawberry Stadium; Hammond, LA	Southeastern Channel	W 34–14	6,795
November 3	7:00 pm	Northwestern State	No. 14	Estes Stadium; Conway, AR	SLC TV	W 35–14	11,579
November 17	5:00 pm	No. 24 Eastern Illinois*	No. 10	Estes Stadium; Conway, AR		W 48–30	6,754
December 1	1:00 pm	at No. 6 Georgia Southern*	No. 8	Paulson Stadium; Statesboro, GA (NCAA Division I Second Round)	ESPN3	L 16–24	8,888
*Non-conference game; Rankings from The Sports Network Poll released prior to the game; All times are in Central time

== Game summaries ==
=== Ole Miss ===
#24 Central Arkansas at Ole Miss

Team	1	2	3	4	Total
#24 Bears	7	13	0	7	27
• Rebels	14	0	14	21	49

- Date: September 1
- Location: Vaught–Hemingway Stadium
  Oxford, MS
- Game start: 6:06 pm CST
- Elapsed time: 3:12
- Game attendance: 50,544
- Game weather: 88 °F (31 °C), Fair, winds SW at 14 mph
- Referee: Matt Loeffler
- TV announcers (CSS PPV): Richard Cross and Brett Norsworthy

=== Murray State ===
#25 Central Arkansas at Murray State

Team	1	2	3	4	Total
• #25 Bears	14	14	7	7	42
Racers	0	13	7	0	20

- Date: September 8
- Location: Roy Stewart Stadium
  Murray, KY
- Game start: 6:00 pm CST
- Elapsed time: 3:07
- Game attendance: 9,848
- Game weather: 71 °F (22 °C), Mostly clear, winds 5-10mph
- Referee: Matt Young
- TV announcers (OVC Digital Network): Neal Bradley and Paul Bubb

=== Bacone College ===
Bacone College at Central Arkansas

Team	1	2	3	4	Total
Warriors	0	3	0	0	3
• Bears	21	21	21	7	70

- Date: September 15
- Location: Estes Stadium
  Conway, AR
- Game start: 6:00 pm CST
- Elapsed time: 2:53
- Game attendance: 9,079
- Referee: Buddy Gingras

=== #3 Sam Houston State ===
The 7th meeting between the Bearkats and the Bears will provide one team with the series lead. Currently the two are 3–3 in head-to-head matches with the Bears having won the first 3 matches and the Bearkats having won the past 3.

#3 Sam Houston State at #25 Central Arkansas

Team	1	2	3	4	Total
#3 Bearkats	10	0	0	10	20
• #25 Bears	0	7	3	14	24

- Date: September 22
- Location: Estes Stadium
  Conway, AR
- Game start: 3:05 pm CST
- Elapsed time: 3:10
- Game attendance: 10,157
- Referee: Mike Dean
- TV announcers (SLC TV): Randy McIlvoy, Shea Walker, & Erin Cofiell

=== Stephen F. Austin ===
The Bears look to build on last years win and build upon the 4–2 record they have against the Lumberjacks. However, the Lumberjacks have recent history on their side, having won the 2009 and 2010 matches.

#16 Central Arkansas at Stephen F. Austin

Team	1	2	3	4	Total
#16 Bears	21	0	7	9	37
• Lumberjacks	15	20	0	7	42

- Date: September 29
- Location: Homer Bryce Stadium
  Nacogdoches, TX
- Game start: 6:00 PM CST
- Elapsed time: 3:42
- Game attendance: 7,324
- Game weather: 73 °F (23 °C), Rainy
- Referee: Randy Christal
- TV announcers (Lumberjack TV): Rob Meyers and Max Holmes

=== Nicholls State ===
The Bears have never lost to the Colonels at home, owning a 3–0 record and a 4–2 series lead overall. The Bears have also won 3 straight in the series and 4 of the last 5 games.

Nicholls State at #24 Central Arkansas

Team	1	2	3	4	Total
Colonels	7	6	0	0	13
• #24 Bears	7	6	14	7	34

- Date: October 6
- Location: Estes Stadium
  Conway, AR
- Game start: 6:37 PM CST
- Elapsed time: 2:45
- Game attendance: 4,357
- Game weather: 52 °F (11 °C), Overcast and Rainy
- Referee: Buddy Gingras
- TV announcers (UCA Gameday): Justin Acri

=== McNeese State ===
The Bears own a 3–3 record against the Cowboys. However, they have won two games in a row and 3 of the last 4 to even the series.

#21 Central Arkansas at #19 McNeese State

Team	1	2	3	4	Total
• #21 Bears	7	3	0	17	27
#19 Cowboys	3	9	0	14	26

- Date: October 13
- Location: Cowboy Stadium
  Lake Charles, LA
- Game start: 7:00 PM CST
- Elapsed time: 2:50
- Game attendance: 12,913
- Game weather: 81 °F (27 °C), Partly Cloudy, winds SSE 17mph
- Referee: Alan Eck
- TV announcers (UCA Gameday): Justin Acri

=== Lamar ===
The Cardinals head to Conway, Arkansas for the second match against their SLC rival, the Bears. Currently Central Arkansas leads the series 1–0.

Lamar at #19 Central Arkansas

Team	1	2	3	4	Total
Cardinals	0	0	7	7	14
• #19 Bears	0	17	0	7	24

- Date: October 20
- Location: Estes Stadium
  Conway, AR
- Game start: 6:00 PM CST
- Elapsed time: 2:35
- Game attendance: 9,374
- Referee: Buddy Gingras
- TV announcers (UCA Gameday): Justin Acri

=== Southeastern Louisiana ===
The team the Bears have had the most success against in the SLC is the Lions. The Bears own a 4–1 series advantage and have won two straight as they head into this 2012 contest.

Central Arkansas at Southeastern Louisiana

Team	1	2	3	4	Total
• Bears	7	7	7	13	34
Lions	0	0	14	0	14

- Date: October 27
- Location: Strawberry Stadium
  Hammond, LA
- Game start: 7:00 PM CST
- Elapsed time: 2:56
- Game attendance: 6,795
- Referee: Alan Eck
- TV announcers (Southeastern Channel): Allen Waddell and Trey Willie

=== Northwestern State ===
SLC play ends with the match against the Demons. The rivalry has been unexpectedly close, with the Bears hold a 3–2 series advantage. After winning in 2011, the Bears hope to make it two consecutive wins.

Northwestern State at Central Arkansas

Team	1	2	3	4	Total
Demons	7	7	0	0	14
• Bears	14	14	7	0	35

- Date: November 3
- Location: Estes Stadium
  Conway, AR
- Game start: 7:00 PM CST
- Elapsed time: 3:20
- Game attendance: 11,579
- Game weather: 73 °F (23 °C)
- Referee: Ken Ray
- TV announcers (SLC TV): Randy McIlvoy, Shea Walker, and Brooke Bentley

=== Eastern Illinois ===
Eastern Illinois at Central Arkansas

Team	1	2	3	4	Total
Panthers	7	16	0	7	30
• Bears	10	14	10	14	48

- Date: November 17
- Location: Estes Stadium
  Conway, AR
- Game start: 5:00 PM CST
- Elapsed time: 3:07
- Game attendance: 6,754
- Referee: Buddy Gingras
- TV announcers (UCA Gameday): Justin Acri

== Ranking movements ==
Ranking movements Legend: ██ Increase in ranking ██ Decrease in ranking RV = Received votes
	Week													
Poll	Pre	1	2	3	4	5	6	7	8	9	10	11	12	Final
Sports Network	24	25	RV	25	16	24	21	19	14	13	14	10	8	8
Coaches	19	20	20	21	14	20	17	17	14	13	13	10	8	8

== Media ==
All Central Arkansas were aired on KHLR 106.7 FM and are streamed online through the station's website.
