= 2012 Nicholls State Colonels football team =

American college football season

2012 Nicholls State Colonels football
- Conference: Southland Conference
- Record: 1–10 (0–7 Southland)
- Head coach: Charlie Stubbs (3rd season)
- Offensive scheme: Multiple pro-style
- Defensive coordinator: Jeremy Atwell (4th season)
- Base defense: 3–4
- Home stadium: John L. Guidry Stadium

2012 Southland Conference football standings
	Conf.			Overall
Team	W		L	W		L
No. 10 Central Arkansas +^	6	–	1	9	–	3
No. 2 Sam Houston State +^	6	–	1	11	–	4
Southeastern Louisiana	5	–	2	5	–	6
McNeese State	4	–	3	7	–	4
Stephen F. Austin	4	–	3	5	–	6
Northwestern State	2	–	5	4	–	7
Lamar	1	–	6	4	–	8
Nicholls State	0	–	7	1	–	10
+ – Conference co-champions; ^ – FCS playoff participant; Rankings from The Sports Network poll

The 2012 Nicholls State Colonels football team represented Nicholls State University as a member of the Southland Conference during the 2012 NCAA Division I FCS football season. Led by third-year head coach Charlie Stubbs, the Colonels compiled an overall record of 1–10 with a mark of 0–7 in conference play, placing last out of six teams in the Southland. Nicholls State played home games at John L. Guidry Stadium in Thibodaux, Louisiana.

== Schedule ==
Date	Time	Opponent	Site	TV	Result	Attendance
September 8	4:00 pm	at South Alabama*	Ladd–Peebles Stadium; Mobile, AL	ESPN3	L 3–9	15,237
September 15	6:00 pm	at Tulsa*	H. A. Chapman Stadium; Tulsa, OK		L 16–66	19,139
September 22	6:00 pm	Evangel*	John L. Guidry Stadium; Thibodaux, LA		W 73–17	6,022
October 6	6:00 pm	at No. 24 Central Arkansas	Estes Stadium; Conway, AR		L 14–34	4,357
October 13	6:00 pm	No. 9 Sam Houston State^{†}	John L. Guidry Stadium; Thibodaux, LA		L 0–41	5,632
October 20	3:00 pm	at Stephen F. Austin	Homer Bryce Stadium; Nacogdoches, TX	SLCTV	L 10–44	12,310
October 27	6:00 pm	at Northwestern State	Harry Turpin Stadium; Natchitoches, LA (NSU Challenge)		L 26–27	9,749
November 3	3:00 pm	McNeese State	John L. Guidry Stadium; Thibodaux, LA	SLCTV	L 10–42	5,299
November 10	3:00 pm	at Lamar	Provost Umphrey Stadium; Beaumont, TX		L 24–34	8,043
November 15	6:00 pm	Southeastern Louisiana	John L. Guidry Stadium; Thibodaux, LA (River Bell Classic)	WHNO	L 16–35	5,110
December 1	1:30 pm	at No. 15 (FBS) Oregon State*	Reser Stadium; Corvallis, OR	Pac-12	L 3–77	32,427
*Non-conference game; ^{†}Homecoming; Rankings from The Sports Network Poll released prior to the game; All times are in Central time

== Game summaries ==
=== South Alabama ===
Nicholls State at South Alabama

Team	1	2	3	4	Total
Nicholls State Colonels	0	3	0	0	3
• South Alabama Jaguars	0	3	3	3	9

- Date: September 8
- Location: Ladd–Peebles Stadium
  Mobile, AL
- Game start: 4:00 PM CST
- Elapsed time: 3:17
- Game attendance: 15,237
- Game weather: 88 °F (31 °C), Sunny, winds N at 9mph
- Referee: Riley Johnson
- TV announcers (ESPN3): Jared Schwartz and Stan Lewter

=== Tulsa ===
Nicholls State at Tulsa

Team	1	2	3	4	Total
Nicholls State Colonels	6	3	0	7	16
• Tulsa Golden Hurricane	28	14	10	14	66

- Date: September 15
- Location: H. A. Chapman Stadium
  Tulsa, OK
- Game start: 6:05 PM CST
- Elapsed time: 3:02
- Game attendance: 19,139
- Game weather: 73 °F (23 °C), Cloudy, winds calm
- Referee: Chris Snead

=== Evangel ===
Evangel at Nicholls State

Team	1	2	3	4	Total
Evangel Crusaders	7	10	0	0	17
• Nicholls State Colonels	24	14	21	14	73

- Date: September 22
- Location: John L. Guidry Stadium
  Thibodaux, LA
- Game start: 6:00 PM CST
- Elapsed time: 3:04
- Game attendance: 6,022
- Game weather: 85 °F (29 °C), Partly Cloudy, winds NE at 9mph
- Referee: Ken Ray

=== Central Arkansas ===
Nicholls State at Central Arkansas

Team	1	2	3	4	Total
Nicholls State Colonels	7	6	0	0	13
• Central Arkansas Bears	7	6	14	7	34

- Date: October 6
- Location: Estes Stadium
  Conway, AR
- Game start: 6:37 PM CST
- Elapsed time: 2:45
- Game attendance: 4,357
- Game weather: 52 °F (11 °C), Overcast and Rainy
- Referee: Buddy Gingras
- TV announcers (UCA Gameday): Justin Acri

=== Sam Houston State ===
Sam Houston State at Nicholls State

Team	1	2	3	4	Total
• Sam Houston State Bearkats	0	14	20	7	41
Nicholls State Colonels	0	0	0	0	0

- Date: October 13
- Location: John L. Guidry Stadium
  Thibodaux, LA
- Game start: 6:00 PM CST
- Elapsed time: 2:54
- Game attendance: 5,632
- Game weather: 82 °F (28 °C), Scattered Clouds, Winds SE 14mph
- Referee: Ross Smith

=== Stephen F. Austin ===
Nicholls State at Stephen F. Austin

Team	1	2	3	4	Total
Nicholls State Colonels	0	0	3	7	10
• Stephen F. Austin Lumberjacks	10	21	3	10	44

- Date: October 20
- Location: Homer Bryce Stadium
  Nacogdoches, TX
- Game start: 3:00 PM CST
- Elapsed time: 3:22
- Game attendance: 12,310
- Game weather: 82 °F (28 °C), Clear & Sunny, Winds S at 9-12mph
- Referee: Ross Smith
- TV announcers (SLC TV): Randy McIlvoy, Shea Walker, and Brooke Bentley

=== Northwestern State ===
Nicholls State at Northwestern State

Team	1	2	3	4	Total
Nicholls State Colonels	9	10	7	0	26
• Northwestern State Demons	14	7	0	6	27

- Date: October 27
- Location: Harry Turpin Stadium
  Natchitoches, LA
- Game start: 6:00 PM CST
- Elapsed time: 2:23
- Game attendance: 9,749
- Game weather: 60 °F (16 °C), Sunny, windy, Winds N at 18mph
- Referee: Buddy Gingras

Scoring summary

Quarter	Time	Drive			Team	Scoring information	Score	
Quarter	Time	Plays	Yards	TOP	Team	Scoring information	NSU	NWST
"TOP" = time of possession. For other American football terms, see Glossary of American football.								

=== McNeese State ===
McNeese State at Nicholls State

Team	1	2	3	4	Total
• McNeese State Cowboys	7	14	7	14	42
Nicholls State Colonels	0	3	0	7	10

- Date: November 3
- Location: John L. Guidry Stadium
  Thibodaux, LA
- Game start: 3:00 PM CST
- Elapsed time: 3:00
- Game attendance: 5,299
- Game weather: 81 °F (27 °C), Sunny and clear
- Referee: Ross Smith
- TV announcers (SLC TV): Kevin Eschenfelder, Rene Nadeau, and Erin Cofiell

=== Lamar ===
Nicholls State at Lamar

Team	1	2	3	4	Total
Nicholls State Colonels	3	0	14	7	24
• Lamar Cardinals	7	13	0	14	34

- Date: November 10
- Location: Provost Umphrey Stadium
  Beaumont, TX
- Game start: 3:05 PM CST
- Elapsed time: 2:55
- Game attendance: 8,043
- Game weather: 79 °F (26 °C), Partly cloudy, Winds SE 18mph
- Referee: Buddy Gingras

Scoring summary

Quarter	Time	Drive			Team	Scoring information	Score	
Quarter	Time	Plays	Yards	TOP	Team	Scoring information	NSU	Lamar
"TOP" = time of possession. For other American football terms, see Glossary of American football.								

=== Southeastern Louisiana ===
Southeastern Louisiana at Nicholls State

Team	1	2	3	4	Total
• Southeastern Louisiana Lions	0	14	7	14	35
Nicholls State Colonels	0	3	0	13	16

- Date: November 17
- Location: John L. Guidry Stadium
  Thibodaux, LA
- Game start: 6:00 PM CST
- Elapsed time: 3:07
- Game attendance: 5,110
- Game weather: 60 °F (16 °C), Clear, Winds NE at 7mph
- Referee: Ross Smith
- Television network: WHNO

Scoring summary

Quarter	Time	Drive			Team	Scoring information	Score	
Quarter	Time	Plays	Yards	TOP	Team	Scoring information	SELA	NSU
"TOP" = time of possession. For other American football terms, see Glossary of American football.								

=== Oregon State ===
The 2012 season was scheduled to begin with Oregon State playing the Colonels. It was to be the first meeting between the two programs. However, Hurricane Isaac changed this. Since the Colonels hadn't practiced together since August 25 and the campus didn't reopen until September 3, the game was postponed. A December 1 make-up date occurred, when Nicholls State did not make the playoffs.

Nicholls State at Oregon State

Team	1	2	3	4	Total
Nicholls State Colonels	0	0	3	0	3
• #15 Oregon State Beavers	14	21	14	28	77

- Date: December 1
- Location: Reser Stadium
  Corvallis, OR
- Game start: 1:30 PM CST
- Elapsed time: 3:06
- Game attendance: 32,427
- Game weather: 50 °F (10 °C), Partly sunny, Winds SE at 15mph
- Referee: Jack Folliard
- Television network: Pac-12 Network

== Media ==
Nicholls State football games were broadcast live on the radio through KLRZ 100.3 FM, KLEB AM 1600, and KBZE 105.9 FM. KLRZ and KLEB also streamed the games online.
