= 2012 Stephen F. Austin Lumberjacks football team =

American college football season

2012 Stephen F. Austin Lumberjacks football
- Conference: Southland Conference
- Record: 5–6 (4–3 Southland)
- Head coach: J. C. Harper (6th season)
- Offensive coordinator: Richard Olin (1st season)
- Defensive coordinator: David Gibbs (5th season)
- Home stadium: Homer Bryce Stadium

2012 Southland Conference football standings
| | Conf. | | | Overall |
| Team | W | | L | W | | L |
|---|---|---|---|---|---|---|
| No. 10 Central Arkansas +^ | 6 | – | 1 | 9 | – | 3 |
| No. 2 Sam Houston State +^ | 6 | – | 1 | 11 | – | 4 |
| Southeastern Louisiana | 5 | – | 2 | 5 | – | 6 |
| McNeese State | 4 | – | 3 | 7 | – | 4 |
| Stephen F. Austin | 4 | – | 3 | 5 | – | 6 |
| Northwestern State | 2 | – | 5 | 4 | – | 7 |
| Lamar | 1 | – | 6 | 4 | – | 8 |
| Nicholls State | 0 | – | 7 | 1 | – | 10 |
+ – Conference co-champions; ^ – FCS playoff participant; Rankings from The Sports Network poll

The 2012 Stephen F. Austin Lumberjacks football team represented Stephen F. Austin State University in the 2012 NCAA Division I FCS football season. The Lumberjacks were led by sixth-year head coach J. C. Harper and played their home games at Homer Bryce Stadium. They were a member of the Southland Conference. They finished the season 5–6, 4–3 in Southland play to finish in a tie for fourth place.

== Before the season ==
=== CFPA nominees ===
Senior wide outs Gralyn Crawford and Cordell Roberson were both named to the 2012 College Football Performance Awards (CFPA) watch list. Senior quarterback Brady Attaway was also named to the watch list.

=== 2012 recruits ===
College recruiting information (2012)
| Name | Hometown | School | Height | Weight | Commit date |
|---|---|---|---|---|---|
| Marshall Williams; QB | Flower Mound, TX | Flower Mound | 6 ft 5 in (1.96 m) | 195 lb (88 kg) | |
| Marshall Williams; QB | Recruit ratings: No ratings found | | | | |
| Avery Henderson; S | Tyler, TX | Chapel Hill | 5 ft 11 in (1.80 m) | 190 lb (86 kg) | |
| Avery Henderson; S | Recruit ratings: No ratings found | | | | |
| Anthony Kincade; CB | Tyler, TX | Chapel Hill | 5 ft 11 in (1.80 m) | 160 lb (73 kg) | |
| Anthony Kincade; CB | Recruit ratings: No ratings found | | | | |
| Hunter Taylor; QB | Whitehouse, TX | Whitehouse | 6 ft 1 in (1.85 m) | 180 lb (82 kg) | |
| Hunter Taylor; QB | Recruit ratings: No ratings found | | | | |
| Artrez Price; DE | Killeen, TX | Killeen | 6 ft 3 in (1.91 m) | 225 lb (102 kg) | |
| Artrez Price; DE | Recruit ratings: No ratings found | | | | |
| Sam Schomp; OL | Lindale, TX | Lindale | 6 ft 4 in (1.93 m) | 295 lb (134 kg) | |
| Sam Schomp; OL | Recruit ratings: No ratings found | | | | |
| Demundre Freeman; CB | Cedar Hill, TX | Cedar Hill | 5 ft 11 in (1.80 m) | 175 lb (79 kg) | |
| Demundre Freeman; CB | Recruit ratings: No ratings found | | | | |
| J. C. Franklin; S | Cedar Hill, TX | Cedar Hill | 5 ft 11 in (1.80 m) | 260 lb (120 kg) | |
| J. C. Franklin; S | Recruit ratings: No ratings found | | | | |
| Travis Wiggins; OL | Grand Prairie, TX | South Grand Prairie | 6 ft 3 in (1.91 m) | 280 lb (130 kg) | |
| Travis Wiggins; OL | Recruit ratings: No ratings found | | | | |
| Jordan Burton; LB | Longview, TX | Longview | 6 ft 3 in (1.91 m) | 200 lb (91 kg) | |
| Jordan Burton; LB | Recruit ratings: No ratings found | | | | |
| Byron Williams; OL | Dickinson, TX | Dickinson | 6 ft 3 in (1.91 m) | 285 lb (129 kg) | |
| Byron Williams; OL | Recruit ratings: No ratings found | | | | |
| Corey Clark; DT | Lufkin, TX | Lufkin | 6 ft 2 in (1.88 m) | 250 lb (110 kg) | |
| Corey Clark; DT | Recruit ratings: No ratings found | | | | |
| Jamarcus Walker; RB | Lufkin, TX | Lufkin | 5 ft 8 in (1.73 m) | 170 lb (77 kg) | |
| Jamarcus Walker; RB | Recruit ratings: No ratings found | | | | |
| De'Vante Lacy; WR | Grand Prairie, TX | Grand Prairie | 5 ft 10 in (1.78 m) | 180 lb (82 kg) | |
| De'Vante Lacy; WR | Recruit ratings: No ratings found | | | | |
| Lamarcus Brown; WR | Henderson, TX | Henderson | 5 ft 10 in (1.78 m) | 170 lb (77 kg) | |
| Lamarcus Brown; WR | Recruit ratings: No ratings found | | | | |
| Trevor Holmes; LB | Newton, TX | Newton | 6 ft 1 in (1.85 m) | 215 lb (98 kg) | |
| Trevor Holmes; LB | Recruit ratings: No ratings found | | | | |
| Patrick Martin; CB | Spring, TX | Dekaney | 6 ft 10 in (2.08 m) | 170 lb (77 kg) | |
| Patrick Martin; CB | Recruit ratings: No ratings found | | | | |
| Garrett Muehlstein; ATH | Decatur, TX | Decatur | 6 ft 3 in (1.91 m) | 215 lb (98 kg) | |
| Garrett Muehlstein; ATH | Recruit ratings: No ratings found | | | | |
| Kedrick Harrison; DE | Coldspring, TX | Coldspring-Oakhurst | 6 ft 2 in (1.88 m) | 220 lb (100 kg) | |
| Kedrick Harrison; DE | Recruit ratings: No ratings found | | | | |
| Nick Bruno; PK/ P | Garland, TX | Rowlett | 5 ft 10 in (1.78 m) | 185 lb (84 kg) | |
| Nick Bruno; PK/ P | Recruit ratings: No ratings found | | | | |
| Terran Vaughn; OL | Beaumont, TX | Ozen | 6 ft 3 in (1.91 m) | 290 lb (130 kg) | |
| Terran Vaughn; OL | Recruit ratings: No ratings found | | | | |
Overall recruit ranking: Scout: Not Ranked Rivals: Not Ranked ESPN: Not Ranked
Note: In many cases, Scout, Rivals, 247Sports, On3, and ESPN may conflict in their listings of height and weight.; In these cases, the average was taken. ESPN grades are on a 100-point scale.; Sources: "2012 Player Commitments - Stephen F. Austin Lumberjacks". ESPN.; "2012 Team Ranking". Rivals.com.

== Schedule ==
| Date | Time | Opponent | Rank | Site | TV | Result | Attendance |
|---|---|---|---|---|---|---|---|
| August 31 | 6:00 pm | Southwestern Oklahoma State* | No. 20 | Homer Bryce Stadium; Nacogdoches, TX | Lumberjack TV | W 49–14 | 1,149 |
| September 8 | 2:30 pm | at SMU* | No. 19 | Gerald J. Ford Stadium; University Park, TX | TWC Texas | L 0–52 | 20,122 |
| September 15 | 2:30 pm | at No. 3 Montana State* | No. 23 | Bobcat Stadium; Bozeman, MT | KCEB | L 35–43 | 17,147 |
| September 22 | 6:00 pm | at Texas State* | | Bobcat Stadium; San Marcos, TX | | L 37–41 | 17,188 |
| September 29 | 6:00 pm | No. 16 Central Arkansas | | Homer Bryce Stadium; Nacogdoches, TX | Lumberjack TV | W 42–37 | 7,324 |
| October 6 | 3:00 pm | vs. No. 9 Sam Houston State | | Reliant Stadium; Houston, TX (Battle of the Piney Woods) | SLC TV | L 43–51 | 26,185 |
| October 20 | 3:00 pm | Nicholls State | | Homer Bryce Stadium; Nacogdoches, TX | SLC TV | W 44–10 | 12,310 |
| October 27 | 7:00 pm | at McNeese State | | Cowboy Stadium; Lake Charles, LA | SLC TV | L 24–35 | 12,213 |
| November 3 | 6:00 pm | Lamar | | Homer Bryce Stadium; Nacogdoches, TX | Lumberjack TV | W 40–26 | 4,421 |
| November 10 | 7:00 pm | at Southeastern Louisiana | | Strawberry Stadium; Hammond, LA | Southeastern Channel | L 27–42 | 4,183 |
| November 17 | 6:00 pm | Northwestern State | | Homer Bryce Stadium; Nacogdoches, TX (Chief Caddo) | | W 34–17 | 8,341 |
*Non-conference game; Rankings from The Sports Network Poll released prior to the game; All times are in Central time

== Game summaries ==
=== Southwestern Oklahoma State ===
Southwestern Oklahoma State at #20 Stephen F. Austin

| Team | 1 | 2 | 3 | 4 | Total |
|---|---|---|---|---|---|
| Bulldogs | 0 | 0 | 0 | 14 | 14 |
| • Lumberjacks | 14 | 14 | 14 | 7 | 49 |

- Date: August 31
- Location: Homer Bryce Stadium
  Nacogdoches, TX
- Game start: 6:00 CST
- Elapsed time: 3:08
- Game attendance: 1,149
- Game weather: 90 °F (32 °C), Cloudy and Muggy, Winds SSE 8-12mph
- Referee: Buddy Gingras
- TV announcers (Lumberjack TV): Rob Meyers and Max Holmes

The Lumberjacks open the season with their lone non-conference home game against the Division II Bulldogs. This will be the first ever meeting between Stephen F. Austin and Southwestern Oklahoma State.

=== SMU ===
The Mustangs and Lumberjacks meet each other for the second time in school history. In the previous match, in 2009, SMU managed to sneak away with a 31–23 win.

#19 Stephen F. Austin at SMU

| Team | 1 | 2 | 3 | 4 | Total |
|---|---|---|---|---|---|
| Lumberjacks | 0 | 0 | 0 | 0 | 0 |
| • Mustangs | 0 | 21 | 14 | 17 | 52 |

- Date: September 8
- Location: Gerald J. Ford Stadium
  University Park, TX
- Game start: 7:05 PM CST
- Elapsed time: 3:30
- Game attendance: 20,122
- Game weather: 84 °F (29 °C), Clear, winds NE at 10mph
- Referee: Steve Barth
- TV announcers (TWC Texas): John Nelson, Pete Stein, and Dave Michaels

=== Montana State ===
The only FCS tuneup before SLC play starts takes place between Montana State and the Lumberjacks. The 2012 meeting will be the fifth meeting between the two squads with Montana State holding a 3–1 advantage.

#23 Stephen F. Austin at #3 Montana State

| Team | 1 | 2 | 3 | 4 | Total |
|---|---|---|---|---|---|
| Lumberjacks | 10 | 10 | 3 | 12 | 35 |
| • Bobcats | 14 | 7 | 7 | 15 | 43 |

- Date: September 15
- Location: Bobcat Stadium
  Bozeman, MT
- Game start: 2:37 PM CST
- Elapsed time: 3:36
- Game attendance: 17,147
- Game weather: 74 °F (23 °C), Sunny and very smokey, winds WNW at 0-15mph
- Referee: Jim Crowley
- TV announcers (KCEB): Chris Byers, Mike Callaghan, and Jeff Ebrie

=== Texas State ===
The team that has typically handled the Lumberjacks the easiest is the Bobcats. Stephen F. Austin enters the 2012 contest with a 29-56-1 record against Texas State. The Bobcats have won 5 contests in a row and 7 of the last 8 against the Lumberjacks.

Stephen F. Austin at Texas State

| Team | 1 | 2 | 3 | 4 | Total |
|---|---|---|---|---|---|
| Lumberjacks | 10 | 7 | 14 | 6 | 37 |
| • Bobcats | 17 | 10 | 14 | 0 | 41 |

- Date: September 22
- Location: Bobcat Stadium
  San Marcos, TX
- Game start: 6:00 PM CST
- Game attendance: 17,188
- Game weather: 87 °F (31 °C), Sunny, winds ESE at 6mph
- Referee: Jim Farmer
- TV announcers (Txstatebobcats.com): Brent Freeman and Bill Culhane

=== Central Arkansas ===
The Bears and Lumberjacks open SLC play for the sixth consecutive year with the Bears holding a slim 4–2 advantage over the Lumberjacks. After losing in 2011, the Lumberjacks attempted to win their third game in 4 years against the Bears.

Central Arkansas at Stephen F. Austin

| Team | 1 | 2 | 3 | 4 | Total |
|---|---|---|---|---|---|
| Bears | 21 | 0 | 7 | 9 | 37 |
| • Lumberjacks | 15 | 20 | 0 | 7 | 42 |

- Date: September 29
- Location: Homer Bryce Stadium
  Nacogdoches, TX
- Game start: 6:00 PM CST
- Elapsed time: 3:42
- Game attendance: 7,324
- Game weather: 73 °F (23 °C), Raining
- Referee: Randy Christal
- TV announcers (Lumberjack TV): Rob Meyers and Max Holmes

=== Sam Houston State ===
The Battle of the Piney Woods returns to Reliant Stadium for a third consecutive season. The Lumberjacks will try to end a 1-game losing streak against the Bearkats and cut into the deficit record they have against the Bearkats of 35-49-2.

#9 Sam Houston State vs. Stephen F. Austin

| Team | 1 | 2 | 3 | 4 | Total |
|---|---|---|---|---|---|
| • Bearkats | 3 | 20 | 21 | 7 | 51 |
| Lumberjacks | 7 | 7 | 14 | 15 | 43 |

- Date: October 6
- Location: Reliant Stadium
  Houston, TX
- Game start: 3:00 PM CST
- Elapsed time: 3:44
- Game attendance: 26,185
- Game weather: Indoors
- Referee: Tom Walker
- TV announcers (SLC TV): Randy McIlvoy, Shea Walker, and Brooke Bentley

=== Nicholls State ===
The Lumberjacks have had their most success in the SLC against the Colonels. The 29th meeting finds the Lumberjacks 21–7 against the Colonels, having won 4 straight and 6 of the past 7. That lone set back was by 1 point in 2007 (17-16).

Nicholls State at Stephen F. Austin

| Team | 1 | 2 | 3 | 4 | Total |
|---|---|---|---|---|---|
| Colonels | 0 | 0 | 3 | 7 | 10 |
| • Lumberjacks | 10 | 21 | 3 | 10 | 44 |

- Date: October 20
- Location: Homer Bryce Stadium
  Nacogdoches, TX
- Game start: 3:00 PM CST
- Elapsed time: 3:22
- Game attendance: 12,310
- Game weather: 82 °F (28 °C), Clear & Sunny, Winds S at 9-12mph
- Referee: Ross Smith
- TV announcers (SLC TV): Randy McIlvoy, Shea Walker, and Brooke Bentley

=== McNeese State ===
This 2012 contest returns to Lake Charles where the Lumberjacks are 7–7 against the Cowboys. Overall this will be the 32nd meeting between the two schools. The Cowboys lead the overall series 16-13-2, but the Lumberjacks have won the past 3 meetings.

Stephen F. Austin at McNeese State

| Team | 1 | 2 | Total |
|---|---|---|---|
| Lumberjacks | | | 0 |
| Cowboys | | | 0 |

- Date: October 27
- Location: Cowboy Stadium
  Lake Charles, LA
- TV announcers (SLC TV): Lyn Rollins, Rene Nadeau, and Erin Cofiell

=== Lamar ===
The Lumberjacks have won four consecutive against the Cardinals and five of the last six meetings, but overall they trail the series 10-18-2.

Lamar at Stephen F. Austin

| Team | 1 | 2 | Total |
|---|---|---|---|
| Cardinals | | | 0 |
| Lumberjacks | | | 0 |

- Date: November 3
- Location: Homer Bryce Stadium
  Nacogdoches, TX

=== Southeastern Louisiana ===
The Lumberjacks final road game finds them trying to build on their recent dominance of the Lions. The Lumberjacks have won four in a row in the series and five of the past six. Overall, the Lumberjacks lead the series 9-5-1.

Stephen F. Austin at Southeastern Louisiana

| Team | 1 | 2 | Total |
|---|---|---|---|
| Lumberjacks | | | 0 |
| Lions | | | 0 |

- Date: November 10
- Location: Strawberry Stadium
  Hammond, LA

=== Northwestern State ===
The Lumberjacks end the regular season at home as they try for their fourth consecutive win over the Demons in the annual Battle for Chief Caddo. Overall, the Demons lead the series against the Lumberjacks 42-23-3.

Northwestern State at Stephen F. Austin

| Team | 1 | 2 | Total |
|---|---|---|---|
| Demons | | | 0 |
| Lumberjacks | | | 0 |

- Date: November 17
- Location: Homer Bryce Stadium
  Nacogdoches, TX

== Roster ==
2012 Stephen F. Austin Lumberjacks football team roster
Players
Coaches
Offense

| Pos. | # | Name | Class |
|---|---|---|---|
| C | 69 | Garrick Smitherman | Fr |
| QB, WR | 20 | Garrett Muehlstein | Fr |
| QB | 8 | Brady Attaway | Jr |
| QB | 10 | Joe Minden | Fr |
| QB | 5 | Colt Plaster | So |
| QB | 18 | Hunter Taylor | Fr |
| RB | 11 | Jeremy Barnes | Sr |
| RB | 12 | Fred Ford | So |
| RB | 6 | Gus Johnson | So |
| RB | 22 | Keith Lawson | Jr |
| RB | 25 | Jamarcus Walker | Fr |
| WR | 83 | Braxton Bearden | Fr |
| WR | 1 | Tyler Boyd | So |
| WR | 2 | Mike Brooks | Jr |
| WR | 87 | Lamarcus Brown | Fr |
| WR | 82 | Dominique Carroll | So |
| WR | 17 | Gralyn Crawford | Sr |
| WR | 86 | Steven Cunnigan | So |
| WR | 19 | Anthony Foster | Jr |
| WR | 84 | Ryan Gambel | Sr |
| WR | 85 | Calib Hadnot | So |
| WR | 88 | De'Vante Lacy | Fr |
| WR | 3 | Kris Lott | Jr |
| WR | 4 | Marquis Mosley | So |
| WR | 80 | Cordell Roberson | Sr |
| WR | 81 | Aaron Thomas | Fr |

Defense

| Pos. | # | Name | Class |

Special teams

| Pos. | # | Name | Class |
|---|---|---|---|
| DS | 59 | Bryan West | Jr |
| K | 42 | Jordan Wiggs | So |
| K, P | 45 | Nick Bruno | Fr |

Head coach

- J. C. Harper (Clemson)

Coordinators/assistant coaches

- David Gibbs (Stephen F. Austin)
  Defensive coordinator/safeties
- Arlington Nunn (Clemson)
  Asst. Head coach/cornerbacks
- Richard Olin (Northern Iowa)
  Offensive coordinator/quarterbacks
- Kevin Carberry (Ohio)
  Defensive ends
- Troy Rogers (Stephen F. Austin)
  Outside Receivers
- Jeremy Moses (Stephen F. Austin)
  Inside Receivers
- Nathan Schneider (LSU)
  Running backs/Director of Football Operations
- Devin Ducote (Stephen F. Austin)
  Linebackers
- Dan Eason (Missouri State)
  Strength & Conditioning
- Jake Morrison (McNeese State)
  Defensive tackles
- Chris Truax (LSU)
  Recruiting coordinator/offensive line
- C. J. Bolton (Stephen F. Austin)
  Student Manager
- Jose Castaneda (Stephen F. Austin)
  Student Manager
- Forrest Cox (Stephen F. Austin)
  Student Manager
- Dale Griffith (Stephen F. Austin)
  Student Manager
- Jacob Jeffries (Stephen F. Austin)
  Student Manager
- Sandy Miller (Nebraska)
  Head Athletic Trainer
- Matt O'Brien (Stephen F. Austin)
  Student Manager

Legend

- (C) Team captain
- (S) Suspended
- (I) Ineligible
- Injured
- Redshirt

Roster

== Ranking movements ==
Ranking movements Legend: ██ Increase in ranking ██ Decrease in ranking RV = Received votes
| | Week | | | | | | | | | | | | | | | | |
| Poll | Pre | 1 | 2 | 3 | 4 | 5 | 6 | 7 | 8 | 9 | 10 | 11 | 12 | 13 | 14 | 15 | Final |
|---|---|---|---|---|---|---|---|---|---|---|---|---|---|---|---|---|---|
| Sports Network | 20 | 19 | 23 | | | RV | | | | | | | | | | | |
| Coaches | 24 | 22 | | | | | | | | | | | | | | | |
