= 2012 McNeese State Cowboys football team =

American college football season

2012 McNeese State Cowboys football
- Conference: Southland Conference
- Record: 7–4 (4–3 Southland)
- Head coach: Matt Viator (7th season)
- Offensive coordinator: Tim Leger (6th season)
- Defensive coordinator: Mike Collins (2nd season)
- Home stadium: Cowboy Stadium

2012 Southland Conference football standings
	Conf.			Overall
Team	W		L	W		L
No. 10 Central Arkansas +^	6	–	1	9	–	3
No. 2 Sam Houston State +^	6	–	1	11	–	4
Southeastern Louisiana	5	–	2	5	–	6
McNeese State	4	–	3	7	–	4
Stephen F. Austin	4	–	3	5	–	6
Northwestern State	2	–	5	4	–	7
Lamar	1	–	6	4	–	8
Nicholls State	0	–	7	1	–	10
+ – Conference co-champions; ^ – FCS playoff participant; Rankings from The Sports Network poll

The 2012 McNeese State Cowboys football team represented McNeese State University as a member of the Southland Conference during the 2012 NCAA Division I FCS football season. Led by seventh-year head coach Matt Viator, the Cowboys compiled an overall record of 7–4 with a mark of 4–3 in conference play, tying for fourth place in the Southland. McNeese State played home games at Cowboy Stadium in Lake Charles, Louisiana.

== Schedule ==
Date	Time	Opponent	Rank	Site	TV	Result	Attendance
August 30	6:30 pm	at Middle Tennessee*		Johnny "Red" Floyd Stadium; Murfreesboro, TN	ESPN3	W 27–21	18,690
September 8	7:00 pm	McMurry*	No. 22	Cowboy Stadium; Lake Charles, LA	Cowboy Insider	W 69–7	13,291
September 15	7:00 pm	at Weber State*	No. 19	Stewart Stadium; Ogden, UT	Big Sky TV	W 35–21	9,617
September 22	7:00 pm	at Southeastern Louisiana	No. 19	Strawberry Stadium; Hammond, LA	The Southeastern Channel	L 24–25	4,791
September 29	7:00 pm	Northwestern State	No. 24	Cowboy Stadium; Lake Charles, LA (rivalry)	Cowboy Insider	W 30–22	10,532
October 13	7:00 pm	No. 21 Central Arkansas	No. 19	Cowboy Stadium; Lake Charles, LA (Red Beans and Rice Bowl)	Cowboy Insider	L 26–27	12,913
October 20	2:00 pm	at No. 6 Sam Houston State		Bowers Stadium; Huntsville, TX	CSNH	L 10–45	10,151
October 27	7:00 pm	Stephen F. Austin^{†}		Cowboy Stadium; Lake Charles, LA	SLC TV	W 35–24	12,213
November 3	3:00 pm	at Nicholls State		John L. Guidry Stadium; Thibodaux, LA	SLC TV	W 42–10	5,299
November 10	1:00 pm	at UTSA*		Alamodome; San Antonio, TX		L 24–31	25,784
November 17	7:00 pm	Lamar		Cowboy Stadium; Lake Charles, LA (Battle of the Border)	Cowboys Insider	W 35–0	11,235
*Non-conference game; ^{†}Homecoming; Rankings from The Sports Network Poll released prior to the game; All times are in Central time

== Game summaries ==
=== Middle Tennessee ===
McNeese State at Middle Tennessee State

Team	1	2	3	4	Total
• Cowboys	0	14	10	3	27
Blue Raiders	3	3	0	15	21

- Date: August 30
- Location: Johnny "Red" Floyd Stadium
  Murfreesboro, TN
- Game start: 6:32 CST
- Elapsed time: 3:03
- Game attendance: 18,690
- Game weather: 83 °F (28 °C), Clear and nice, winds SW at 10mph
- Referee: Jeff Hillyer
- TV announcers (ESPN3): Chip Walters and Kelly Holcomb

After Texas A&M bought out the 2012 game scheduled against McNeese State, the Cowboys were able to find a replacement to open the season in the form of the Blue Raiders. It will be the first ever meeting between the two schools.

Scoring summary

Quarter	Time	Drive			Team	Scoring information	Score	
Quarter	Time	Plays	Yards	TOP	Team	Scoring information	MSU	MTST
1	12:40	6	34	3:20	Middle Tennessee State	20-yard field goal by Carlos Lopez	0	3
2	14:53	11	55	3:53	Middle Tennessee State	28-yard field goal by Carlos Lopez	0	6
2	9:20	11	70	5:33	McNeese State	Josh Jordan 2-yard touchdown reception from Tyler Bolfing, Josh Lewis kick good	7	6
2	0:33	10	87	5:43	McNeese State	Champlain Babin 8-yard touchdown reception from Cody Stroud, Josh Lewis kick good	14	6
3	12:00	8	51	3:00	McNeese State	46-yard field goal by Josh Lewis	17	6
3	1:20	5	49	2:08	McNeese State	Cody Stroud 1-yard touchdown run, Josh Lewis kick good	24	6
4	6:58	17	97	4:17	Middle Tennessee State	Anthony Amos 6-yard touchdown reception from Logan Kilgore, 2-point pass to Jordan Parker from Logan Kilgore good	24	14
4	5:21	5	25	1:37	McNeese State	33-yard field goal by Josh Lewis	27	14
4	5:01	1	15	0:20	Middle Tennessee State	Kyle Griswould 15-yard touchdown reception from Logan Kilgore, Carlos Lopez kick good	27	21
"TOP" = time of possession. For other American football terms, see Glossary of American football.							27	21

=== McMurry ===
The Cowboys look to get rid of a goose egg when they meet the D2 Independent War Hawks. McMurry and McNeese State have met twice before, in 1957 and 1958, with the War Hawks owning a 2–0 record against the Cowboys.

McMurry at #21 McNeese State

Team	1	2	3	4	Total
War Hawks	0	0	7	0	7
• Cowboys	21	24	14	10	69

- Date: September 8
- Location: Cowboy Stadium
  Lake Charles, LA
- Game start: 7:00 PM CST
- Elapsed time: 2:50
- Game attendance: 13,291
- Game weather: 74 °F (23 °C), Cloudy, winds N at 13mph
- Referee: Buddy Gingras

Scoring summary

Quarter	Time	Drive			Team	Scoring information	Score	
Quarter	Time	Plays	Yards	TOP	Team	Scoring information	McMurry	McNeese St.
1	8:40	10	61	4:33	McNeese State	Cody Stroud 1-yard touchdown run, Josh Lewis kick good	0	7
1	3:01	7	62	3:11	McNeese State	Javaris Murray 1-yard touchdown run, Josh Lewis kick good	0	14
1	0:26	4	22	1:09	McNeese State	Damion Dixon 10-yard touchdown reception from Cody Stroud, Josh Lewis kick good	0	21
2	13:11	3	46	1:11	McNeese State	Darius Carey 13-yard touchdown reception from Cody Stroud, Josh Lewis kick good	0	28
2	11:40				McNeese State	Interception returned 41 yards for touchdown by Chris Raggett, Josh Lewis kick good	0	35
2	5:46	9	83	5:13	McNeese State	Darius Carey 52-yard touchdown reception from Tyler Bolfing, Josh Lewis kick good	0	42
2	1:28	4	8	1:39	McNeese State	23-yard field goal by Josh Lewis	0	45
3	11:21				McNeese State	Interception returned 30 yards for touchdown by Chris Raggett, James Bice kick good	0	52
3	3:49	9	95	4:45	McNeese State	Dillon Berlin 5-yard touchdown run, James Bice kick good	0	59
3	2:28	3	4	1:21	McMurry	Clinton McCoy 7-yard touchdown reception from Brady Lambert, Josh King kick good	7	59
4	12:11	9	37	5:27	McNeese State	27-yard field goal by James Bice	7	62
4	10:43	3	32	1:18	McNeese State	Kelvin Bennett 17-yard touchdown run, James Bice kick good	7	69
"TOP" = time of possession. For other American football terms, see Glossary of American football.							7	69

=== Weber State ===
The Cowboys and Wildcats meet for the third time in 2012 with the series even at 1–1, the last having taken place in 1990 with Weber prevailing 27–7. The Wildcats will head to Lake Charles in 2013 as part of this home-and-home series.

#19 McNeese State at Weber State

Team	1	2	3	4	Total
• #19 Cowboys	0	14	7	14	35
Wildcats	0	0	7	14	21

- Date: September 15
- Location: Stewart Stadium
  Ogden, UT
- Game start: 7:05 PM CST
- Elapsed time: 2:53
- Game attendance: 9,617
- Game weather: 81 °F (27 °C), Sunny, winds N at 3mph
- Referee: Bruce Palmer
- TV announcers (Big Sky TV): Carl Arky and Ty Sparrow

Scoring summary

Quarter	Time	Drive			Team	Scoring information	Score	
Quarter	Time	Plays	Yards	TOP	Team	Scoring information	McNeese St.	Weber St.
2	4:00	9	80	4:01	McNeese State	Darius Casey 3-yard touchdown run, Josh Lewis kick good	7	0
2	00:16	11	80	2:47	McNeese State	Cody Stroud 4-yard touchdown run, Josh Lewis kick good	14	0
3	11:25	7	33	1:59	Weber State	Shaydon Kehano 10-yard touchdown reception from Mike Hoke, Shaun McClain kick good	14	7
3	10:07	1	91	0:13	McNeese State	Dionate Spencer 91-yard touchdown run, Josh Lewis kick good	21	7
4	10:56	8	49	3:56	McNeese State	Jereon McGilvery 8-yard touchdown reception from Cody Stroud, Josh Lewis kick good	28	7
4	6:45	2	80	0:51	McNeese State	Javaris Murray 76-yard touchdown run, Josh Lewis kick good	35	7
4	3:50	10	66	2:49	Weber State	C. J. Tuckett 2-yard touchdown run, Shaun McClain kick good	35	14
4	00:20	7	63	1:01	Weber State	Jordan Adamczyk 3-yard touchdown run, Shaun McClain kick good	35	21
"TOP" = time of possession. For other American football terms, see Glossary of American football.							35	21

=== Southeastern Louisiana ===
SLC play begins with this match against the Lions. The Cowboys currently own a 22–15 record against the Lions.

McNeese State at Southeastern Louisiana

Team	1	2	3	4	Total
Cowboys	14	10	0	0	24
• Lions	3	7	7	8	25

- Date: September 22
- Location: Strawberry Stadium
  Hammond, LA
- Game start: 7:00 PM CST
- Elapsed time: 2:56
- Game attendance: 4,791
- Referee: Scott Novak
- TV announcers (Southeastern Channel): Allen Waddell and Trey Willie

Scoring summary

Quarter	Time	Drive			Team	Scoring information	Score	
Quarter	Time	Plays	Yards	TOP	Team	Scoring information	McNeese St.	SE Louisiana
1	7:39	9	63	4:48	McNeese State	Cody Stroud 1-yard touchdown run, Josh Lewis kick good	7	0
1	6:22	4	21	1:11	McNeese State	Kendale Thomas 8-yard touchdown reception from Cody Stroud, Josh Lewis kick good	14	0
1	0:04	15	49	6:10	Southeastern Louisiana	49-yard field goal by Seth Sebastian	14	3
2	10:01	2	41	0:26	Southeastern Louisiana	Nathan Stanley 2-yard touchdown run, Seth Sebastian kick good	14	10
2	8:41	3	72	1:15	McNeese State	Javaris Murray 26-yard touchdown reception from Cody Stroud, Josh Lewis kick good	21	10
2	0:03	17	60	4:06	McNeese State	30-yard field goal by Josh Lewis	24	10
3	3:26	15	86	7:03	Southeastern Louisiana	Michael Chaney 2-yard touchdown run, Seth Sebastian kick good	24	17
4	2:39	17	80	6:25	Southeastern Louisiana	Taylor Jenkins 2-yard touchdown reception from Nathan Stanley, 2-point run by Michael Chaney good	24	25
"TOP" = time of possession. For other American football terms, see Glossary of American football.							24	25

=== Northwestern State ===
SLC play continues when the Demons and Cowboys meet with the Cowboys owning a 40–20–1 record against Northwestern State.

Northwestern State at McNeese State

Team	1	2	3	4	Total
Demons	0	0	14	8	22
• Cowboys	7	10	3	10	30

- Date: September 29
- Location: Cowboy Stadium
  Lake Charles, LA
- Game start: 7:00 PM CST
- Elapsed time: 3:03
- Game attendance: 10,532
- Game weather: 78 °F (26 °C), Cloudy, winds ESE at 5mph
- Referee: Ross Smith
- TV announcers (Cowboy Insider): Tom Hoefer, Johnny Suydam, and Richard Dow

Scoring summary

Quarter	Time	Drive			Team	Scoring information	Score	
Quarter	Time	Plays	Yards	TOP	Team	Scoring information	Northwestern St.	McNeese St.
1	6:29	5	52	2:23	McNeese State	Josh Jordan 17-yard touchdown reception from Cody Stroud, Josh Lewis kick good	0	7
2	14:07	5	73	1:52	McNeese State	Diontae Spencer 43-yard touchdown reception from Cody Stroud, Josh Lewis kick good	0	14
2	0:00	14	64	2:48	McNeese State	17-yard field goal by Josh Lewis	0	17
3	13:56	3	34	1:04	Northwestern State	Clifton Brown 18-yard touchdown reception from Brad Henderson, John Shaughnessy kick good	7	17
3	4:33	18	64	9:23	McNeese State	21-yard field goal by Josh Lewis	7	20
3	2:44	6	74	1:49	Northwestern State	Phillip Harvey 41-yard touchdown reception from Brad Henderson, John Shaughnessy kick good	14	20
4	10:19	4	7	2:03	McNeese State	31-yard field goal by Josh Lewis	14	23
4	9:28	2	22	0:47	McNeese State	Javaris Murray 18-yard touchdown run, Josh Lewis kick good	14	30
4	5:58	11	98	3:30	Northwestern State	Jovhan Jilbert 58-yard touchdown reception from Brad Henderson, 2-point Jovhan Jilbert pass to Robert Walker good	22	30
"TOP" = time of possession. For other American football terms, see Glossary of American football.							22	30

=== Central Arkansas ===
Central Arkansas heads to Cowboy Stadium in 2012. The Cowboys are 3–3 against the Bears.

Central Arkansas at McNeese State

Team	1	2	3	4	Total
• Bears	7	3	0	17	27
Cowboys	3	9	0	14	26

- Date: October 13
- Location: Cowboy Stadium
  Lake Charles, LA
- Game start: 7:00 PM CST
- Elapsed time: 2:50
- Game attendance: 12,913
- Game weather: 81 °F (27 °C), Partly Cloudy, winds SSE 17mph
- Referee: Alan Eck
- TV announcers (UCA Gameday): Justin Acri

Scoring summary

Quarter	Time	Drive			Team	Scoring information	Score	
Quarter	Time	Plays	Yards	TOP	Team	Scoring information	C. Arkansas	McNeese St.
"TOP" = time of possession. For other American football terms, see Glossary of American football.							27	26

=== Sam Houston State ===
The defending conference champions appear near the end of November. The Cowboys own a 24–8–1 record against Sam Houston State, but the Bearkats have won the recent games.

McNeese State at Sam Houston State

Team	1	2	Total
Cowboys			0
Bearkats			0

- Date: October 20
- Location: Bowers Stadium
  Huntsville, TX
- TV announcers (CSN Houston): Dave Saltzman, Eddie Robinson Jr., and Bart Enis

Scoring summary

Quarter	Time	Drive			Team	Scoring information	Score	
Quarter	Time	Plays	Yards	TOP	Team	Scoring information	MSU	SHSU
"TOP" = time of possession. For other American football terms, see Glossary of American football.								

=== Stephen F. Austin ===
An attempt to pull further away from the Lumberjacks takes place in this 2012 contest. The Cowboys own a 16–13–2 record against the Lumberjacks.

Stephen F. Austin at McNeese State

Team	1	2	Total
Lumberjacks			0
Cowboys			0

- Date: October 27
- Location: Cowboy Stadium
  Lake Charles, LA
- TV announcers (SLC TV): Lyn Rollins, Rene Nadeau, and Erin Cofiell

Scoring summary

Quarter	Time	Drive			Team	Scoring information	Score	
Quarter	Time	Plays	Yards	TOP	Team	Scoring information	SFA	MSU
"TOP" = time of possession. For other American football terms, see Glossary of American football.								

=== Nicholls State ===
The Cowboys open November with the Colonels. It's the 37th meeting with the Cowboys owning a 25–11 advantage in the series.

McNeese State at Nicholls State

Team	1	2	Total
Cowboys			0
Colonels			0

- Date: November 3
- Location: John L. Guidry Stadium
  Thibodaux, LA
- TV announcers (SLC TV): Kevin Eschenfelder, Rene Nadeau, and Erin Cofiell

Scoring summary

Quarter	Time	Drive			Team	Scoring information	Score	
Quarter	Time	Plays	Yards	TOP	Team	Scoring information	MSU	NSU
"TOP" = time of possession. For other American football terms, see Glossary of American football.								

=== UTSA ===
The Roadrunners stand as the final non-conference team until playoff time comes for the Cowboys in 2012. It's the second meeting between the 2 with McNeese having won the 2011 match.

McNeese State at UTSA

Team	1	2	Total
Cowboys			0
Roadrunners			0

- Date: November 10
- Location: Alamodome
  San Antonio, TX

Scoring summary

Quarter	Time	Drive			Team	Scoring information	Score	
Quarter	Time	Plays	Yards	TOP	Team	Scoring information	MSU	UTSA
"TOP" = time of possession. For other American football terms, see Glossary of American football.								

=== Lamar ===
The 31st meeting between the Cardinals and Cowboys closes the 2012 SLC season. The Cowboys own a 21–8–1 record against the Cardinals.

Lamar at McNeese State

Team	1	2	Total
Cardinals			0
Cowboys			0

- Date: November 17
- Location: Cowboy Stadium
  Lake Charles, LA

Scoring summary

Quarter	Time	Drive			Team	Scoring information	Score	
Quarter	Time	Plays	Yards	TOP	Team	Scoring information	Lamar	MSU
"TOP" = time of possession. For other American football terms, see Glossary of American football.								

== Ranking movements ==
Ranking movements Legend: ██ Increase in ranking ██ Decrease in ranking RV = Received votes
	Week																
Poll	Pre	1	2	3	4	5	6	7	8	9	10	11	12	13	14	15	Final
Sports Network	RV	22	19	19	24	21	19	RV	RV	RV	RV	RV	RV	RV	RV	RV	RV
Coaches	RV	21	19	17	21	18	15	21	RV	RV	RV	RV	RV	RV	RV	RV	RV

== Media ==
All McNeese State games will be broadcast on Gator 99.5 FM. KVHP 30.2 is the local affiliate for SLC TV and will air McNeese State games on SLC TV.
