= Ron Roberts (American football) =

American football player and coach (born 1967)

- Roberts in 2026

Current position
- Title: Defensive coordinator
- Team: Arkansas
- Conference: SEC

Biographical details
- Born: October 9, 1967 (age 59); Visalia, California, U.S.

Playing career
- 1986–1987: Sequoias
- 1988–1989: Tennessee–Martin
- Position: Linebacker

Coaching career (HC unless noted)
- 1990–1993: Houston HS (TN) (DC)
- 1994–1996: Burroughs HS (CA)
- 1997: Greensboro (DC)
- 1998–2002: Tusculum (DC)
- 2003: Texas State (DC)
- 2004: Mt. Whitney HS (CA)
- 2005–2006: Delta State (DC)
- 2007–2011: Delta State
- 2012–2017: Southeastern Louisiana
- 2018–2019: Louisiana (DC)
- 2020–2022: Baylor (DC/ILB)
- 2023: Auburn (DC)
- 2024: Florida (EHC/co-DC/LB)
- 2025: Florida (EHC/DC/LB)
- 2026–present: Arkansas (DC)

Head coaching record
- Overall: 89–45 (college)

Accomplishments and honors

Championships
- 4 Gulf South (2007–2008, 2010–2011); 2 Southland (2013–2014)

Awards
- 2× Gulf South Coach of The Year (2007, 2008)

Ron Roberts (born October 9, 1967) is an American football coach. He is the defensive coordinator at the University of Arkansas, a position he has held since 2026. Roberts served as the head football coach at Delta State University in Cleveland, Mississippi from 2007 to 2011 and Southeastern Louisiana University from 2012 to 2017.

== Coaching career ==
=== Assistant coaching career ===
Roberts started his coaching career as the defensive coordinator at Houston High School in 1990. From Houston, Roberts served as head coach at Burroughs High School from 1994 to 1996 before taking his first college job at Greensboro in 1997. From Greensboro he served as defensive coordinator at both Tusculum (1998–2002) and Texas State (2003) before returning to the head coaching ranks at Mt. Whitney High School in 2004. In January 2005 Roberts resigned his position at Mt. Whitney to serve as defensive coordinator at Delta State University After the 2017 season at Southeastern, Coach Roberts accepted a defensive coordinator job with the Louisiana Ragin' Cajuns, his first coaching job at a Division I FBS level. Coach Roberts is the former defensive coordinator at Baylor University, where he led the #1 Scoring Defense in the Big 12 in 2021. At the conclusion of the 2022 season, Baylor head coach Dave Aranda announced that Roberts had been relieved of his duties. Less than 2 weeks later, new Auburn head coach Hugh Freeze named Roberts the program's defensive coordinator.

=== Head coaching career ===
After the resignation of Rick Rhoades on January 12, 2007, Roberts was promoted from his position of defensive coordinator to head coach. Through the 2011 season, Delta State has won four Gulf South Conference championships and played in the Division II playoffs in four of his five years as head coach reaching the 2010 NCAA Division II Championship Game where they lost to Minnesota–Duluth 20–17.

After a successful tenure at Delta State, Roberts became Southeastern Louisiana University's fifteenth head coach on December 19, 2011. He finished his first season with the Lions with an overall record of five wins and six losses (5–6). On November 7, 2013, Roberts signed a three-year contract extension with the Lions. With their victory over Sam Houston State on November 16, 2013, Southeastern Louisiana captured their first Southland Conference championship in program history.

== Head coaching record ==
=== College ===
Year	Team	Overall	Conference	Standing	Bowl/playoffs
Delta State Statesmen (Gulf South Conference) (2007–2011)
2007	Delta State	10–2	8–0	1st	L NCAA Division II Second Round
2008	Delta State	10–2	8–0	1st	L NCAA Division II Quarterfinal
2009	Delta State	5–5	4–4	T–5th	
2010	Delta State	11–4	6–2	T–1st	L NCAA Division II Championship
2011	Delta State	11–3	3–1	1st	L NCAA Division II Semifinal
Delta State:		47–16	29–7		
Southeastern Louisiana Lions (Southland Conference) (2012–2017)
2012	Southeastern Louisiana	5–6	5–2	3rd	
2013	Southeastern Louisiana	11–3	7–0	1st	L NCAA Division I Quarterfinal
2014	Southeastern Louisiana	9–4	7–1	T–1st	L NCAA Division I First Round
2015	Southeastern Louisiana	4–7	3–6	T–8th	
2016	Southeastern Louisiana	7–4	7–2	3rd	
2017	Southeastern Louisiana	6–5	6–3	5th	
Southeastern Louisiana:		42–29	35–14		
Total:		89–45			
National championship Conference title Conference division title or championship game berth
