= 2012 Southeastern Louisiana Lions football team =

American college football season

2012 Southeastern Louisiana Lions football
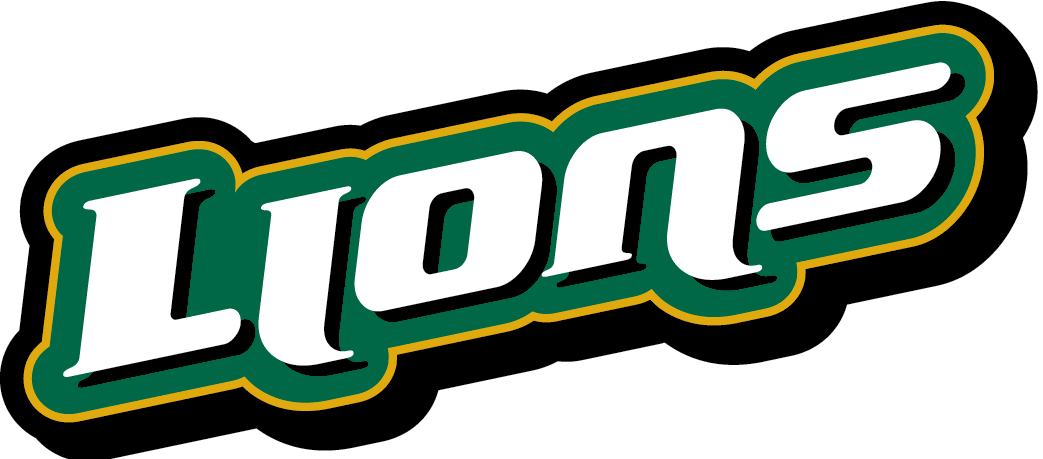
- Conference: Southland Conference
- Record: 5–6 (5–2 Southland)
- Head coach: Ron Roberts (1st season)
- Offensive coordinator: Greg Stevens (1st season)
- Offensive scheme: Spread
- Defensive coordinator: Pete Golding (1st season)
- Base defense: 4–2–5
- Home stadium: Strawberry Stadium

2012 Southland Conference football standings
	Conf.			Overall
Team	W		L	W		L
No. 10 Central Arkansas +^	6	–	1	9	–	3
No. 2 Sam Houston State +^	6	–	1	11	–	4
Southeastern Louisiana	5	–	2	5	–	6
McNeese State	4	–	3	7	–	4
Stephen F. Austin	4	–	3	5	–	6
Northwestern State	2	–	5	4	–	7
Lamar	1	–	6	4	–	8
Nicholls State	0	–	7	1	–	10
+ – Conference co-champions; ^ – FCS playoff participant; Rankings from The Sports Network poll

The 2012 Southeastern Louisiana Lions football team represented Southeastern Louisiana University in the 2012 NCAA Division I FCS football season. The Lions were led by new head coach Ron Roberts and played their home games at Strawberry Stadium. They are a member of the Southland Conference. They finished the season 5–6, 5–2 in Southland play to finish in third place.

== Roster ==
2012 Southeastern Louisiana Lions football team roster
Players			Coaches
Offense: Pos. / # / Name / Class	Defense: Pos. / # / Name / Class	Special teams: Pos. / # / Name / Class	Head coach: Ron Roberts (Memphis); Coordinators/assistant coaches: E. K. Franks (Kansas State) Assoc. head coach/running backs; Pete Golding (Delta State) Defensive coordinator; Brandon Lacy (Kansas) Defensive line/recruiting coordinator; Travis Mikel (Delta State) Offensive line/Director of Football Operations; Chet Pobolish (Emporia State) Special teams; Karl Scott (McMurry) Defensive backs/linebackers; Greg Stevens (Eastern Oregon) Offensive coordinator/quarterbacks; Tyronee Williams (Mars Hill) Wide receivers; Matt Powell (Temple) Director of sports performance; Legend: (C) Team captain; (S) Suspended; (I) Ineligible; Injured; Redshirt; Roster

== Schedule ==
Date	Time	Opponent	Site	TV	Result	Attendance
September 1	6:00 pm	at Missouri*	Faurot Field; Columbia, MO	FSN PPV	L 10–62	62,173
September 8	7:00 pm	South Dakota State*	Strawberry Stadium; Hammond, LA		L 14–31	6,278
September 13	6:00 pm	at UT Martin*	Graham Stadium; Martin, TN		L 6–23	4,012
September 22	7:00 pm	No. 19 McNeese State	Strawberry Stadium; Hammond, LA	Southeastern Channel	W 25–24	4,791
September 29	3:00 pm	at Lamar	Provost Umphrey Stadium; Beaumont, TX	SLC TV	W 31–21	8,426
October 6	2:00 pm	at UAB*	Legion Field; Birmingham, AL	Blazer Vision	L 3–52	16,212
October 13	3:00 pm	Northwestern State	Strawberry Stadium; Hammond, LA	SLC TV	W 27–22	4,284
October 27	7:00 pm	No. 14 Central Arkansas^{†}	Strawberry Stadium; Hammond, LA	Southeastern Channel	L 14–34	6,795
November 3	2:00 pm	at No. 4 Sam Houston State	Bowers Stadium; Huntsville, TX	BSN	L 0–70	6,844
November 10	7:00 pm	Stephen F. Austin	Strawberry Stadium; Hammond, LA	Southeastern Channel	W 42–27	4,183
November 15	6:00 pm	at Nicholls State	John L. Guidry Stadium; Thibodaux, LA (River Bell Classic)		W 35–16	5,110
*Non-conference game; ^{†}Homecoming; Rankings from The Sports Network Poll released prior to the game; All times are in Central time

== Game summaries ==
=== Missouri ===
The Lions open the season for Ron Roberts on the road against the Missouri Tigers. It will be the first ever meeting between the two schools.

Southeastern Louisiana at Missouri

Team	1	2	3	4	Total
Lions	0	3	0	7	10
• Tigers	28	0	20	14	62

- Date: September 1
- Location: Faurot Field
  Columbia, MO
- Game start: 6:07 PM CST
- Elapsed time: 3:21
- Game attendance: 62,173
- Game weather: 78 °F (26 °C), Cloudy w/ humidity at 81%, winds variable at 5 mph
- Referee: Ken Williamson
- TV announcers (FSN PPV): Dave Armstrong, Corby Jones, and Todd Donoho

Scoring summary

Quarter	Time	Drive			Team	Scoring information	Score	
Quarter	Time	Plays	Yards	TOP	Team	Scoring information	SE Louisiana	Missouri
1	11:08	11	75	3:52	Missouri	T. J. Moe 2-yard touchdown reception from James Franklin, Andrew Baggett kick good	0	7
1	10:26				Missouri	Interception returned 20 yards for touchdown by Zaviar Gooden, Andrew Baggett kick good	0	14
1	7:35	1	76	0:14	Missouri	Kendi Lawrence 76-yard touchdown run, Andrew Baggett kick good	0	21
1	7:19				Missouri	Fumble recovery returned 7 yards for touchdown by Michael Sam, Andrew Baggett kick good	0	28
2	0:00	9	62	2:50	Southeastern Louisiana	31-yard field goal by Seth Sebastian	3	28
3	14:16	3	25	0:39	Missouri	Kendi Lawrence 1-yard touchdown run, Andrew Baggett kick failed	3	34
3	4:41				Missouri	Marcus Murray 70-yard punt return for a touchdown, Andrew Baggett kick good	3	41
3	0:13	5	39	2:03	Missouri	Jimmie Hunt 10-yard touchdown reception from Corbin Berkstresser, Andrew Baggett kick good	3	48
4	11:38	6	50	2:27	Missouri	Corbin Berkstresser 1-yard touchdown run, Andrew Baggett kick good	3	55
4	9:45				Missouri	Marcus Murray 72-yard punt return for a touchdown, Andrew Baggett kick good	3	62
4	2:32	13	75	7:13	Southeastern Louisiana	Jeff Smiley 21-yard touchdown reception from Nathan Stanley, Seth Sebastian kick good	10	62
"TOP" = time of possession. For other American football terms, see Glossary of American football.							10	62

=== South Dakota State ===
The Lions first home game comes against South Dakota State. This is the first of a home-and-home series and is the first ever meeting between the two schools. The Lions will head to South Dakota in 2013 to continue this series.

South Dakota State at Southeastern Louisiana

Team	1	2	3	4	Total
• Jackrabbits	3	10	15	3	31
Lions	0	0	7	7	14

- Date: September 8
- Location: Strawberry Stadium
  Hammond, LA
- Game start: 7:00 PM CST
- Elapsed time: 2:54
- Game attendance: 6,278
- Game weather: 82 °F (28 °C), Cloudy, winds NNW at 10 mph
- Referee: David Alvarez

Scoring summary

Quarter	Time	Drive			Team	Scoring information	Score	
Quarter	Time	Plays	Yards	TOP	Team	Scoring information	S. Dakota St.	SE Louisiana
1	1:00	12	80	5:37	South Dakota State	23-yard field goal by Justin Syrovatka	3	0
2	13:39	3	25	1:21	South Dakota State	Seth Daughter 12-yard touchdown reception from Austin Sumner, Justin Syrovatka kick good	10	0
2	6:58	9	57	4:48	South Dakota State	22-yard field goal by Justin Syrovatka	13	0
3	10:12	13	75	4:48	Southeastern Louisiana	Michael Chaney 19-yard touchdown reception from Nathan Stanley, Seth Sebastian kick good	13	7
3	6:55	6	50	3:05	South Dakota State	Jason Schneider 46-yard touchdown reception from Austin Sumner, 2-point Vince Benedetto pass good	21	7
3	3:08	6	55	2:03	South Dakota State	Zach Zenner 35-yard touchdown run, Justin Syrovatka kick good	28	7
4	12:03	7	64	3:24	South Dakota State	26-yard field goal by Justin Syrovatka	31	7
4	1:40				Southeastern Louisiana	Fumble recovery returned 25 yards for touchdown by T'Darryl Grays, Seth Sebastian kick good	31	14
"TOP" = time of possession. For other American football terms, see Glossary of American football.							31	14

=== UT Martin ===
The Skyhawks and the Lions clash for the 6th time in school history with this 2012 contest. Currently the Lions lead the series 4–1.

Southeastern Louisiana at UT Martin

Team	1	2	3	4	Total
Lions	0	0	0	6	6
• Skyhawks	0	7	0	16	23

- Date: September 13
- Location: Graham Stadium
  Martin, TN
- Game start: 6:00 PM CST
- Elapsed time: 3:13
- Game attendance: 4,012
- Game weather: 80 °F (27 °C), Sunny and clear, winds SE at 5 mph
- Referee: Todd Dunaway

Scoring summary

Quarter	Time	Drive			Team	Scoring information	Score	
Quarter	Time	Plays	Yards	TOP	Team	Scoring information	SE Louisiana	UT Martin
2	2:55	9	73	3:36	UT Martin	DJ McNeil 3-yard touchdown run, Jackson Redditt kick good	0	7
4	14:08	13	64	6:16	UT Martin	33-yard field goal by Cody Sandlin	0	10
4	9:47	7	40	3:25	UT Martin	DJ McNeil 1-yard touchdown run, 2-point James Satterfield pass failed	0	16
4	2:29	3	42	1:11	UT Martin	Quentin Sims 5-yard touchdown reception from Derek Carr, Cody Sandlin kick good	0	23
4	0:37	9	62	1:46	Southeastern Louisiana	Jeff Smiley 8-yard touchdown reception from Brian Young, 2-point Brian Young run failed	6	23
"TOP" = time of possession. For other American football terms, see Glossary of American football.							6	23

=== McNeese State ===
The Lions try to end a long losing streak against McNeese in 2012. The series looks fairly lose with McNeese holding a 22–15 record against the Lions, but recent history has the Cowboys dominating the Lions as they have won 6 straight.

McNeese State at Southeastern Louisiana

Team	1	2	3	4	Total
Cowboys	14	10	0	0	24
• Lions	3	7	7	8	25

- Date: September 22
- Location: Strawberry Stadium
  Hammond, LA
- Game start: 7:00 PM CST
- Elapsed time: 2:56
- Game attendance: 4,791
- Referee: Scott Novak
- TV announcers (Southeastern Channel): Allen Waddell and Trey Willie

Scoring summary

Quarter	Time	Drive			Team	Scoring information	Score	
Quarter	Time	Plays	Yards	TOP	Team	Scoring information	McNeese St.	SE Louisiana
1	7:39	9	63	4:48	McNeese State	Cody Stroud 1-yard touchdown run, Josh Lewis kick good	7	0
1	6:22	4	21	1:11	McNeese State	Kendale Thomas 8-yard touchdown reception from Cody Stroud, Josh Lewis kick good	14	0
1	0:04	15	49	6:10	Southeastern Louisiana	49-yard field goal by Seth Sebastian	14	3
2	10:01	2	41	0:26	Southeastern Louisiana	Nathan Stanley 2-yard touchdown run, Seth Sebastian kick good	14	10
2	8:41	3	72	1:15	McNeese State	Javaris Murray 26-yard touchdown reception from Cody Stroud, Josh Lewis kick good	21	10
2	0:03	17	60	4:06	McNeese State	30-yard field goal by Josh Lewis	24	10
3	3:26	15	86	7:03	Southeastern Louisiana	Michael Chaney 2-yard touchdown run, Seth Sebastian kick good	24	17
4	2:39	17	80	6:25	Southeastern Louisiana	Taylor Jenkins 2-yard touchdown reception from Nathan Stanley, 2-point run by Michael Chaney good	24	25
"TOP" = time of possession. For other American football terms, see Glossary of American football.							24	25

=== Lamar ===
Lamar may be a fairly new rival for the Lions, but they have a 3–1 record overall against Southeastern Louisiana. The last win for Southeastern Louisiana over Lamar was back in 1969.

Southeastern Louisiana at Lamar

Team	1	2	3	4	Total
• Lions	7	7	10	7	31
Cardinals	0	7	7	7	21

- Date: September 29
- Location: Provost Umphrey Stadium
  Beaumont, TX
- Game start: 3:05 PM CST
- Elapsed time: 3:05
- Game attendance: 8,426
- Game weather: 76 °F (24 °C), Mostly Cloudy, winds E at 2 mph
- Referee: Buddy Gingras
- TV announcers (SLC TV): Randy McIlvoy, Shea Walker, and Brooke Bentley

Scoring summary

Quarter	Time	Drive			Team	Scoring information	Score	
Quarter	Time	Plays	Yards	TOP	Team	Scoring information	SE Louisiana	Lamar
1	8:54	7	56	2:23	Southeastern Louisiana	Michael Chaney 2-yard touchdown run, Seth Sebastian kick good	7	0
2	13:44	7	51	3:11	Southeastern Louisiana	Michael Chaney 4-yard touchdown run, Seth Sebastian kick good	14	0
2	10:01	8	61	3:35	Lamar	Payden McVey 8-yard touchdown reception from Ryan Mossakowski, Justin Stout kick good	14	7
3	10:28	12	59	5:28	Southeastern Louisiana	26-yard field goal by Seth Sebastian	17	7
3	7:40	6	75	2:43	Lamar	Payden McVey 10-yard touchdown reception from Ryan Mossakowski, Justin Stout kick good	17	14
3	5:27				Southeastern Louisiana	Robert Alford 75-yard punt return for a touchdown, Seth Sebastian kick good	24	14
4	6:58	6	57	2:36	Southeastern Louisiana	Blaine LeBlanc 3-yard touchdown reception from Nathan Stanley, Seth Sebastian kick good	31	14
4	6:58				Lamar	Interception returned 96 yards for touchdown by Tyru McGlothen, Justin Stout kick good	31	21
"TOP" = time of possession. For other American football terms, see Glossary of American football.							31	21

=== UAB ===
Non-conference play concludes to begin October as the Lions and Blazers face each other for the first time.

Southeastern Louisiana at UAB

Team	1	2	3	4	Total
Lions	0	3	0	0	3
• Blazers	21	10	7	14	52

- Date: October 6
- Location: Legion Field
  Birmingham, AL
- Game start: 2:00 PM CST
- Elapsed time: 2:47
- Game attendance: 16,212
- Game weather: 70 °F (21 °C), Partly Sunny, winds N at 8mph
- Referee: Steve LaMantia
- TV announcers (Blazer Vision): David Crane, Steve Irvine, and Sam Miller

Scoring summary

Quarter	Time	Drive			Team	Scoring information	Score	
Quarter	Time	Plays	Yards	TOP	Team	Scoring information	SE Louisiana	UAB
"TOP" = time of possession. For other American football terms, see Glossary of American football.							3	52

=== Northwestern State ===
The Lions and Demons have had a long and close series overall with this being the 44th meeting. The Demons own a slim 22–21 advantage in the overall series.

Northwestern State at Southeastern Louisiana

Team	1	2	3	4	Total
Demons	3	6	6	7	22
• Lions	7	10	10	0	27

- Date: October 13
- Location: Strawberry Stadium
  Hammond, LA
- Game start: 3:05 PM CST
- Elapsed time: 3:12
- Game attendance: 4,284
- Game weather: 84 °F (29 °C), Partly Cloudy, winds SSE at 11 mph
- Referee: Buddy Gingras
- TV announcers (SLC TV): Randy McIlvoy, Shea Walker, and Erin Coefill

Scoring summary

Quarter	Time	Drive			Team	Scoring information	Score	
Quarter	Time	Plays	Yards	TOP	Team	Scoring information	Northwestern St.	SE Louisiana
1	9:20	10	50	4:10	Northwestern State	22-yard field goal by John Shaughnessy	3	0
1	2:14	15	75	7:06	Southeastern Louisiana	Jerry Anderson 4-yard touchdown reception from Nathan Stanley, Seth Sebastian kick good	3	7
2	10:22	5	74	2:24	Southeastern Louisiana	Xavier Roberson 34-yard touchdown run, Seth Sebastian kick good	3	14
2	6:29	12	75	3:53	Northwestern State	Corey Simmons 4-yard touchdown reception from Brad Henderson, John Shaughnessy kick failed	9	14
2	0:55	12	51	5:26	Southeastern Louisiana	22-yard field goal by Seth Sebastian	9	17
3	10:14	6	47	2:38	Southeastern Louisiana	30-yard field goal by Seth Sebastian	9	20
3	5:49	9	92	4:19	Northwestern State	Daniel Taylor 30-yard touchdown reception from Brad Henderson, 2-point Brad Henderson pass failed	15	20
3	2:49	3	46	1:08	Southeastern Louisiana	Xavier Roberson 11-yard touchdown run, Seth Sebastian kick good	15	27
4	4:08	5	62	1:15	Northwestern State	Brad Henderson 8-yard touchdown run, John Shaughnessy kick good	22	27
"TOP" = time of possession. For other American football terms, see Glossary of American football.							22	27

=== Central Arkansas ===
The sixth contest between the Lions and Bears finds the Lions wanting to turn this series around. The Bears own a 4–1 advantage and have won two straight.

Central Arkansas at Southeastern Louisiana

Team	1	2	3	4	Total
• #14 Bears	7	7	7	13	34
Lions	0	0	14	0	14

- Date: October 27
- Location: Strawberry Stadium
  Hammond, LA
- Game start: 7:00 PM CST
- Elapsed time: 2:56
- Game attendance: 6,795
- Referee: Alan Eck
- TV announcers (Southeastern Channel): Chris Coleman, Allen Waddell, and Katie Morse

Scoring summary

Quarter	Time	Drive			Team	Scoring information	Score	
Quarter	Time	Plays	Yards	TOP	Team	Scoring information	C. Arkansas	SE Louisiana
"TOP" = time of possession. For other American football terms, see Glossary of American football.								

=== Sam Houston State ===
As conference play begins to wind down, the Lions and Bearkats meet for the 13th time with the Bearkats owning an 8–4 advantage.

Southeastern Louisiana at Sam Houston State

Team	1	2	3	4	Total
Lions	0	0	0	0	0
• Bearkats	14	28	14	14	70

- Date: November 3
- Location: Bowers Stadium
  Huntsville, TX
- Game start: 2:00 PM CST
- Elapsed time: 4:01
- Game attendance: 6,844
- Referee: Dan Romero
- Television network: BSN

Scoring summary

Quarter	Time	Drive			Team	Scoring information	Score	
Quarter	Time	Plays	Yards	TOP	Team	Scoring information	SE Louisiana	Sam Houston St.
"TOP" = time of possession. For other American football terms, see Glossary of American football.								

=== Stephen F. Austin ===
The final home game features the 15th meeting between the Lumberjacks and Lions. The Lumberjacks own a slim 8–5–1 advantage in the overall series.

Stephen F. Austin at Southeastern Louisiana

Team	1	2	3	4	Total
Lumberjacks	0	21	6	0	27
• Lions	14	6	15	7	42

- Date: November 10
- Location: Strawberry Stadium
  Hammond, LA
- Game start: 7:00 PM CST
- Elapsed time: 3:14
- Game attendance: 4,183
- Game weather: 67 °F (19 °C), Partly Cloudy, winds ESE at 10 mph
- Referee: Ken Ray
- TV announcers (Southeastern Channel): Chris Coleman, Allen Waddell, and Damon Cutno

Scoring summary

Quarter	Time	Drive			Team	Scoring information	Score	
Quarter	Time	Plays	Yards	TOP	Team	Scoring information	Stephen F. Austin	SE Louisiana
"TOP" = time of possession. For other American football terms, see Glossary of American football.								

=== Nicholls State ===
The River Bell Classic ends the regular season for the Lions as they meet their main rival- the Colonels. It's the 22nd meeting with the Colonels owning a 12–9 advantage in the series. The Lions will attempt to push their win streak over the Colonels to two straight.

Southeastern Louisiana at Nicholls State

Team	1	2	3	4	Total
• Lions	0	14	7	14	35
Colonels	0	3	0	13	16

- Date: November 15
- Location: John L. Guidry Stadium
  Thibodaux, LA
- Game start: 6:00 PM CST
- Elapsed time: 3:07
- Game attendance: 5,110
- Game weather: 60 °F (16 °C), Clear, winds NE at 7 mph
- Referee: Ross Smith

Scoring summary

Quarter	Time	Drive			Team	Scoring information	Score	
Quarter	Time	Plays	Yards	TOP	Team	Scoring information	SE Louisiana	Nicholls St.
"TOP" = time of possession. For other American football terms, see Glossary of American football.								
