= Estes Stadium =

Multi-purpose stadium in Conway, Arkansas

First Security Field at Estes Stadium
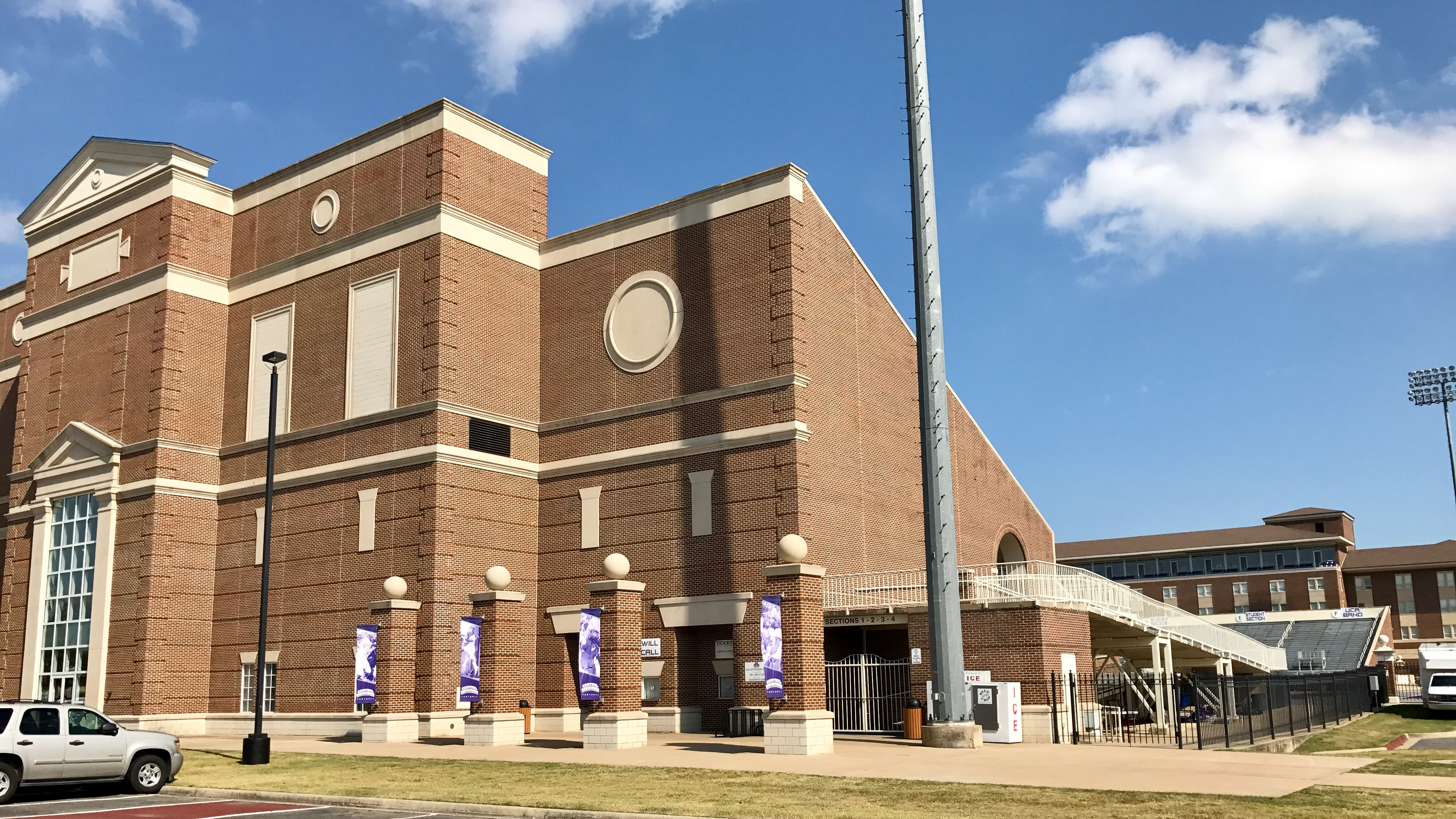
- Interactive map of First Security Field at Estes Stadium
- Location: 201 Donaghey Avenue; Conway, AR 72035
- Coordinates: 35°04′49″N 92°27′37″W
- Owner: University of Central Arkansas
- Operator: University of Central Arkansas
- Capacity: 10,000 (2013–present); 8,700 (2011–2012); 8,500 (1998–2010); 7,000 (1970–1997); 3,500 (1965–1969); 3,000 (1939–1964)
- Surface: Fieldturf

Construction
- Groundbreaking: 1939
- Opened: September 22, 1939
- Renovated: 1998, 2003, 2013
- Architect: Cromwell Architects Engineers (renovation)

Tenant
- Central Arkansas Bears (NCAA)

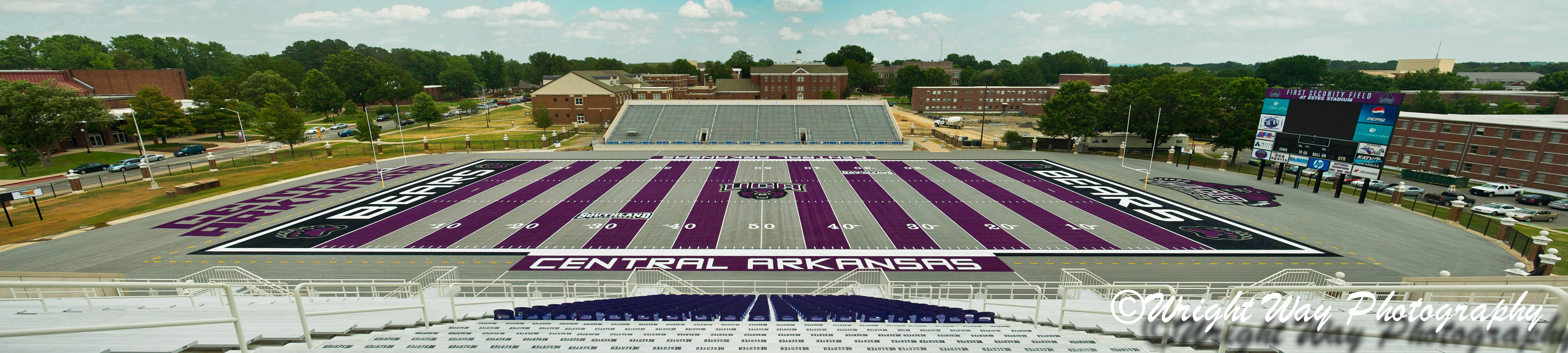
First Security Field at Estes Stadium

First Security Field at Estes Stadium is a 10,000-seat multi-purpose stadium in Conway, Arkansas. It is home to the Central Arkansas Bears football team, representing the University of Central Arkansas in the NCAA's United Athletic Conference. The facility opened in 1939. In 2007, university President Lu Hardin announced that corporate sponsorship had been secured for the stadium from a local bank. As a result, the formal title of the stadium is First Security Field at Estes Stadium. The stadium is named after Dan Estes, who coached the Bears from 1915 to 1932.

== History ==
=== Renovations ===
The west (home) side of the stadium was torn down and rebuilt from the ground up before the 1998 season. The $5 million facility houses the entire football program, including dressing room, weight room, meeting and film rooms, equipment room, coaches' offices and athletic training room.

On April 1, 2011, UCA announced plans to install a purple and gray striped football field for the 2011 season. Installation of the field began in late April, following the conclusion of spring practice, and finished in June.

== Attendance ==
The all-time attendance record, 12,755, was set on September 1, 2011, vs. Henderson State.

== See also ==
- List of NCAA Division I FCS football stadiums
- List of college football stadiums with non-traditional field colors
