= Homer Bryce Stadium =

Stadium in Nacogdoches, Texas

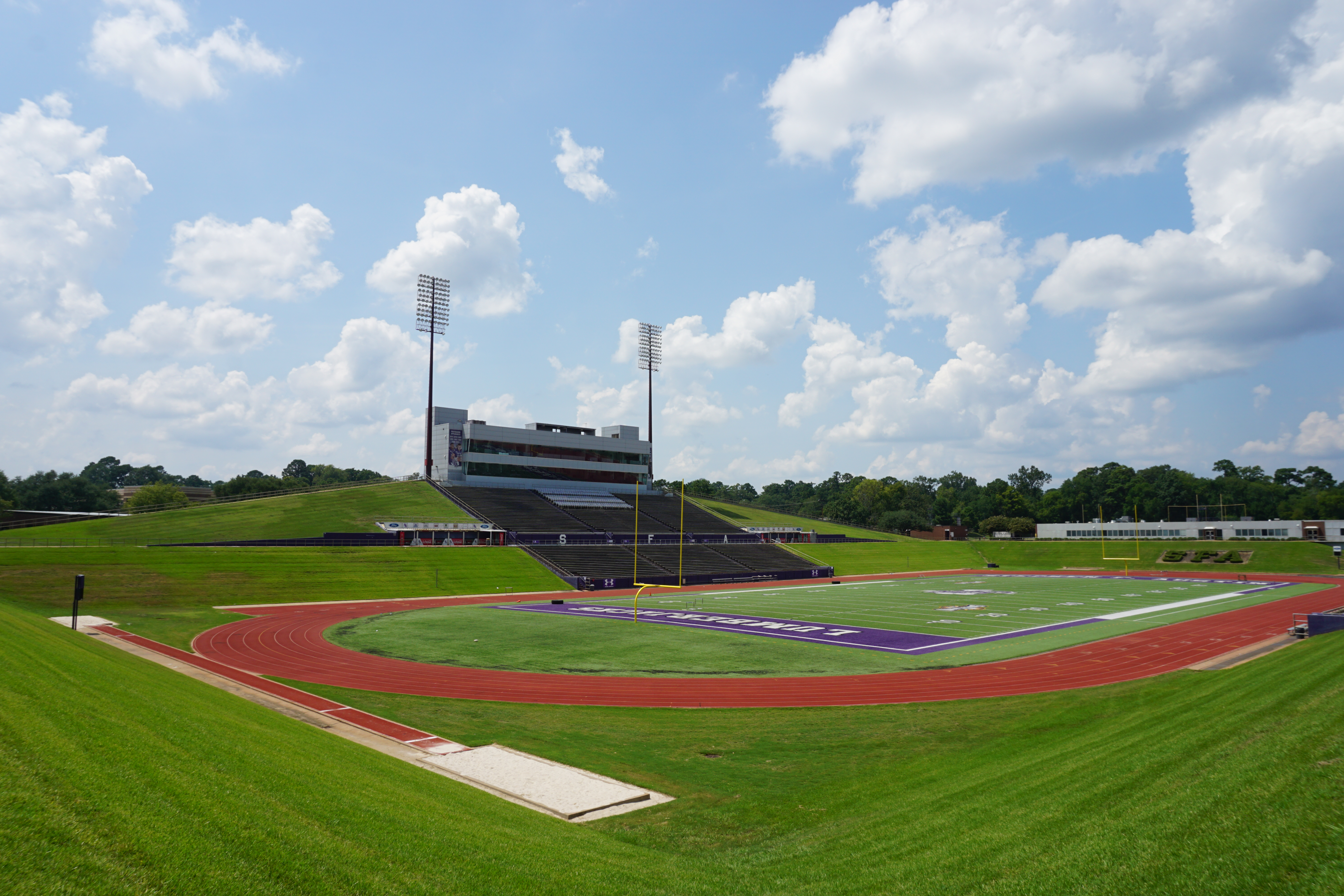
- Interactive map of Homer Bryce Stadium
- Former names: Lumberjack Stadium (1973–1986)
- Location: North University Drive; Nacogdoches, TX 75961
- Coordinates: 31°37′33″N 94°38′40″W
- Owner: Stephen F. Austin State University
- Operator: Stephen F. Austin State University
- Capacity: 14,575 (1989–present); 14,640 (1973–1988)
- Executive suites: Touchdown Club (90 seats) and five private suites (40 seats)
- Surface: Hellas Matrix® Turf
- Record attendance: 23,617; October 28, 1995 vs McNeese State

Construction
- Groundbreaking: 1973
- Opened: September 8, 1973

Tenant
- Stephen F. Austin Lumberjacks football (NCAA) (1973–present)

Homer Bryce Stadium, located in Nacogdoches, Texas, is the home of Stephen F. Austin State University's Lumberjack football and Ladyjack and Lumberjack track and field events. The stadium includes a walking and running track open to the public. After renovations to take place over the summer of 2021 the track will be closed to the public. Recent renovations to the area include a sports medicine and academic center addition to the field house that houses the new athletic training program and the installation of a new artificial turf surface provided by a donation from a former Lumberjack football letterman. A state of the art video board with replay screen was completed in September 2016, home to largest video board in the Southland Conference.

== History ==
Opened in 1973 as Lumberjack Stadium, the stadium seats 14,575 fans. Using the hill surrounding the playing field ups the capacity to nearly 25,000. Record attendance at the stadium was set on October 28, 1995, when 23,617 fans witnessed a game against the McNeese State Cowboys. Homer Bryce Stadium is also home to many premier high school football playoff matchups and track meets.

In 1986, the stadium was renamed Homer Bryce Stadium in honor of SFA benefactor Homer Bryce.

=== Renovations ===
The stadium underwent renovations in 2003 with the addition of five luxury suites and the Touchdown Club located in the remodeled press box. Total capacity is 130 including the 90 seats in the Touchdown Club. Prior to the start of the 2013 season, SFA replaced the surface at Homer Bryce Stadium. During the summer, a Hellas Matrix® Turf surface was installed.

Following the 2015 season the scoreboards at both ends were demolished to make way for a new 80-by-36-foot (24 m × 11 m) video scoreboard from Daktronics. The new board would be the largest in the Southland Conference and third largest in FCS Football behind only South Dakota State and Northern Iowa.

== See also ==
- List of NCAA Division I FCS football stadiums
