= 2013 Abilene Christian Wildcats football team =

American college football season

2013 Abilene Christian Wildcats football
- Conference: Independent
- Record: 6–5
- Head coach: Ken Collums (2nd season)
- Offensive coordinator: Nathan Young (1st season)
- Offensive scheme: Spread
- Defensive coordinator: Darian Dulin (2nd season)
- Base defense: 3–4
- Home stadium: Shotwell Stadium

2013 NCAA Division I FCS independents football standings
| | Conf. | | | Overall |
| Team | W | | L | W | | L |
|---|---|---|---|---|---|---|
| Old Dominion | | – | | 8 | – | 4 |
| Abilene Christian | | – | | 6 | – | 5 |
| Incarnate Word | | – | | 6 | – | 5 |
| Monmouth | | – | | 6 | – | 6 |
| Charlotte | | – | | 5 | – | 6 |
| Houston Baptist | | – | | 3 | – | 4 |
Abilene Christian and Incarnate Word ineligible for FCS playoffs as part of reclassification from Division II; Charlotte and Old Dominion ineligible for FCS playoffs as part of FBS transition; Houston Baptist ineligible for FCS playoffs due to playing only a partial exhibition schedule

The 2013 Abilene Christian Wildcats football team represented Abilene Christian University in the 2013 NCAA Division I FCS football season. Led by second-year head coach Ken Collums, the Wildcats compiled a record of 6–5. Abilene Christian played their home games at Shotwell Stadium in Abilene, Texas.

Abilene Christian played their first transition season at the FCS level in 2013, however, they were not considered a FCS team for scheduling purposes until 2014 and were ineligible for the NCAA Division I Football Championship playoffs and the NCAA Division II Football Championship playoffs. They played a mixed schedule of teams from the NCAA Division I Football Bowl Subdivision (FBS), the NCAA Division I Football Championship Subdivision (FCS), NCAA Division II, and the National Association of Intercollegiate Athletics (NAIA). The Wildcats joined the Southland Conference for football in the 2014 season, which counted as the second year in a four-year transition into NCAA Division I. They became eligible for the FCS playoffs in 2017.

== Schedule ==
| Date | Time | Opponent | Site | TV | Result | Attendance |
|---|---|---|---|---|---|---|
| August 31 | 7:00 pm | Concordia (AL) | Shotwell Stadium; Abilene, TX | KTES-LP* | W 84–6 | 6,031 |
| September 7 | 6:00 pm | McMurry | Shotwell Stadium; Abilene, TX | KTES-LP* | W 60–17 | 7,091 |
| September 14 | 6:00 pm | New Mexico Highlands | Shotwell Stadium; Abilene, TX | KTES-LP* | W 52–28 | 7,114 |
| September 21 | 6:00 pm | at Illinois State | Hancock Stadium; Normal, IL | RedbirdHD.tv | L 17–31 | 11,029 |
| September 28 | 4:00 pm | vs. No. 25 (Div. II) Tarleton State | Toyota Stadium; Frisco, TX | KTES-LP* | L 34–41 ^{2OT} | 5,500 |
| October 5 | 2:00 pm | at Pittsburg State | Carnie Smith Stadium; Pittsburg, KS | CAPSTV* | L 20–28 | 10,981 |
| October 12 | 7:30 pm | at Houston Baptist | BBVA Compass Stadium; Houston, TX | CSNH | W 69–12 | 3,935 |
| October 19 | 2:00 pm | Incarnate Word | Shotwell Stadium; Abilene, TX | KTES-LP* | W 40–6 | 8,119 |
| October 26 | 7:00 pm | at New Mexico State | Aggie Memorial Stadium; Las Cruces, NM | ESPN3 | L 29–34 | 15,628 |
| November 9 | 2:00 pm | at Incarnate Word | Gayle and Tom Benson Stadium; San Antonio, TX | UIWtv | L 31–34 | 3,517 |
| November 16 | 1:00 pm | at Prairie View A&M | Edward L. Blackshear Field; Prairie View, TX | Prairie View Showcas | W 65–45 | 3,156 |
Rankings from Coaches' Poll released prior to the game; All times are in Central time

* Games aired on tape delay

== Game summaries ==
=== Concordia (AL) ===
Concordia College at Abilene Christian

| Team | 1 | 2 | 3 | 4 | Total |
|---|---|---|---|---|---|
| Hornets | 0 | 0 | 6 | 0 | 6 |
| • Wildcats | 27 | 34 | 23 | 0 | 84 |

- Date: August 31
- Location: Shotwell Stadium
  Abilene, TX
- Game start: 7:00 PM CST
- Elapsed time: 3:05
- Game attendance: 6,031
- Game weather: 98 °F (37 °C), Sunny, winds SSE @ 7mph
- Referee: Kevin Hassell
- TV announcers (KTES-LP): Grant Boone, Lance Fleming, and Matt Sloan

Scoring summary
| 1 | 13:42 | ACU | Charcan West 22-yard touchdown run, Nik Grau kick good | ACU 7–0 |
| 1 | 6:53 | ACU | Jamie Walker 15-yard touchdown reception from John David Baker, Nik Grau kick good | ACU 14–0 |
| 1 | 4:37 | ACU | Drew Peters 30-yard touchdown reception from John David Baker, Nik Grau kick good | ACU 21–0 |
| 1 | 0:00 | ACU | Demarcus Thompson 4-yard touchdown reception from John David Baker, Nik Grau kick no good | ACU 27–0 |
| 2 | 12:13 | ACU | Darian Hogg 88-yard touchdown reception from John David Baker, Nik Grau kick good | ACU 34–0 |
| 2 | 8:09 | ACU | Jamie Walker 7-yard touchdown reception from John David Baker, Nik Grau kick good | ACU 41–0 |
| 2 | 4:29 | ACU | Demarcus Thompson 34-yard touchdown reception from John David Baker, Nik Grau kick good | ACU 48–0 |
| 2 | 1:26 | ACU | Darrell Cantu-Harkless 3-yard touchdown rush, Nik Grau kick no good | ACU 54–0 |
| 2 | 0:44 | ACU | Darrell Cantu-Harkless 54-yard touchdown rush, Nik Grau kick good | ACU 61–0 |
| 3 | 14:17 | ACU | Cameron Mayfield intercepted by Tyler Chapa, returned 31-yards for touchdown, Nik Grau kick good | ACU 68–0 |
| 3 | 11:30 | ACU | Darian Hogg 17-yard touchdown reception from John David Baker, Nik Grau kick good | ACU 75–0 |
| 3 | 8:26 | ACU | Jeremiah Williams 4-yard touchdown rush, Nick Grau kick good | ACU 82–0 |
| 3 | 5:43 | CONC | David Hampton 21-yard touchdown reception from Cameron Mayfield, William Sanders kick blocked | ACU 82–6 |
| 3 | 5:43 | ACU | Jesse Harper returns blocked PAT for 2-points | ACU 84–6 |

=== McMurry ===
McMurry at Abilene Christian

| Team | 1 | 2 | 3 | 4 | Total |
|---|---|---|---|---|---|
| War Hawks | 3 | 0 | 14 | 0 | 17 |
| • Wildcats | 7 | 25 | 21 | 7 | 60 |

- Date: September 7
- Location: Shotwell Stadium
  Abilene, TX
- Game start: 6:00 PM CST
- Elapsed time: 2:48
- Game attendance: 7,091
- Game weather: 92 °F (33 °C), Sunny, winds SE @ 11mph
- Referee: Ross Smith
- TV announcers (KTES-LP): Grant Boone, Lance Fleming, and Matt Sloan

Scoring summary
| 1 | 13:42 | ACU | Jamie Walker 3-yard touchdown pass from John David Baker, Nik Grau kick good | ACU 7–0 |
| 1 | 3:32 | MCM | Ian McCarthy 23-yard Field Goal | ACU 7–3 |
| 2 | 13:52 | ACU | Charcan West 14-yard touchdown run, Nik Grau kick good | ACU 14–3 |
| 2 | 8:50 | ACU | Charcan West 8-yard touchdown run, Thor Woerner run good | ACU 22–3 |
| 2 | 4:49 | ACU | Nik Grau 36-yard Field Goal | ACU 25–3 |
| 2 | 0:53 | ACU | Noah Cheshier 1-yard touchdown pass from John David Baker, Nik Grau kick good | ACU 32–3 |
| 3 | 12:46 | MCM | Paxton Grayer 29-yard touchdown run, Ian McCarthy kick good | ACU 32–10 |
| 3 | 12:42 | MCM | Jacob Perez fumble recovery for a touchdown, Ian McCarthy kick good | ACU 32–17 |
| 3 | 7:01 | ACU | Charcan West 34-yard touchdown run, Nik Grau kick good | ACU 39–17 |
| 3 | 4:15 | ACU | John David Baker 23-yard touchdown run, Nik Grau kick good | ACU 46–17 |
| 3 | 1:37 | ACU | Charcan West 7-yard touchdown run, Nik Grau kick good | ACU 53–17 |
| 4 | 8:45 | ACU | Noah Cheshier 6-yard touchdown pass from Malcolm Ruben, Nik Grau kick good | ACU 60–17 |

=== New Mexico Highlands ===
New Mexico Highlands at Abilene Christian

| Team | 1 | 2 | 3 | 4 | Total |
|---|---|---|---|---|---|
| Cowboys | 7 | 0 | 7 | 14 | 28 |
| • Wildcats | 10 | 14 | 28 | 0 | 52 |

- Date: September 14
- Location: Shotwell Stadium
  Abilene, TX
- Game start: 6:00 PM CST
- Elapsed time: 3:19
- Game attendance: 7,114
- Game weather: 89 °F (32 °C), Sunny, winds SE @ 11mph
- Referee: Steve Hardin
- TV announcers (KTES-LP): Grant Boone, Lance Fleming, and Matt Sloan

Scoring summary
| 1 | 12:47 | ACU | Nik Grau 35-yard Field Goal | ACU 3–0 |
| 1 | 6:36 | ACU | Darian Hogg 87-yard touchdown pass from John David Baker, Nik Grau kick good | ACU 10–0 |
| 1 | 0:00 | NMHU | Michael Harrison 14-yard touchdown pass from Emmanuel Lewis, Zach Tapia kick good | ACU 10–7 |
| 2 | 0:35 | ACU | Vincente Cantu-Harkless 8-yard touchdown pass from John David Baker, Nik Grau kick good | ACU 17–7 |
| 2 | 0:09 | ACU | Taylor Gabriel 6-yard touchdown pass from John David Baker, Nik Grau kick good | ACU 24–7 |
| 3 | 13:21 | ACU | Charcan West 1-yard touchdown run, Nik Grau kick good | ACU 31–7 |
| 3 | 12:37 | ACU | Nick Fenney 18-yard fumble return for a touchdown, Nik Grau kick good | ACU 38–7 |
| 3 | 6:34 | NMHU | Michael Harrison 18-yard touchdown pass from Emmanuel Lewis, Zach Tapia kick good | ACU 38–14 |
| 3 | 6:20 | ACU | Taylor Gabriel 75-yard touchdown pass from John David Baker, Nik Grau kick good | ACU 45–14 |
| 3 | 0:55 | ACU | Taylor Gabriel 8-yard touchdown pass from John David Baker, Nik Grau kick good | ACU 52–14 |
| 4 | 10:11 | NMHU | NaDerris Ward 14-yard fumble return for a touchdown, Zach Tapia kick good | ACU 52–21 |
| 4 | 1:16 | NMHU | Lajuantae Hicks 24-yard touchdown pass from Lance Orender, Zach Tapia kick good | ACU 52–28 |

=== Illinois State ===
Abilene Christian at Illinois State

| Team | 1 | 2 | 3 | 4 | Total |
|---|---|---|---|---|---|
| Wildcats | 0 | 10 | 7 | 0 | 17 |
| • Red Birds | 7 | 17 | 0 | 7 | 31 |

- Date: September 21
- Location: Hancock Stadium
  Normal, IL
- Game start: 6:00 PM CST
- Elapsed time: 2:54
- Game attendance: 11,029
- Game weather: 70 °F (21 °C), Sunny & clear, winds NW @ 11mph
- Referee: Kerry Ripley
- TV announcers (REDBIRDHD.TV): Dick Luedke, Ted Schmitz & Craig Bertsche

Scoring summary
| 1 | 11:26 | ILS | Collin Keoshian 10-yard touchdown run, Nick Aussieker kick good | ILS 7–0 |
| 2 | 14:01 | ILS | Nick Aussieker 35-yard Field Goal | ILS 10–0 |
| 2 | 10:38 | ACU | Darian Hogg 23-yard touchdown pass from John David Baker, Nik Grau kick good | ILS 10–7 |
| 2 | 3:52 | ACU | Nik Grau 27-yard Field Goal | Tied 10–10 |
| 2 | 1:48 | ILS | Camero Meredith 19-yard touchdown pass from Blake Winkler, Nick Aussieker kick good | ILS 17–10 |
| 2 | 0:00 | ILS | Anthony Warrum 62-yard punt return for a touchdown, Nick Aussieker kick good | ILS 24–10 |
| 3 | 3:26 | ACU | Darian Hogg 8-yard touchdown pass from John David Baker, Nik Grau kick good | ILS 24–17 |
| 4 | 7:37 | ILS | Collin Keoshian 3-yard touchdown run, Nick Aussieker kick good | ILS 31–17 |

=== Tarleton State ===
Abilene Christian vs. Tarleton State

| Team | 1 | 2 | 3 | 4 | OT | 2OT | Total |
|---|---|---|---|---|---|---|---|
| Wildcats | 0 | 10 | 7 | 14 | 3 | 0 | 34 |
| • Texans | 14 | 7 | 7 | 3 | 3 | 7 | 41 |

- Date: September 28
- Location: Toyota Stadium
  Frisco, TX
- Game start: 4:00 PM CST
- Elapsed time: 3:33
- Game attendance: 5,500
- Game weather: 82 °F (28 °C), Overcast, winds S @ 4mph
- Referee: C. Castleberry
- TV announcers (KTES-LP): Grant Boone, Lance Fleming & Matt Sloan

Scoring summary
| 1 | 2:21 | TSU | Bubba Tandy 26-yard touchdown pass from Jake Fensky, Blake Barnes kick good kick good | TSU 7–0 |
| 1 | 1:11 | TSU | Desmond Jackson 51-yard Interception returned for a touchdown, Blake Barnes kick good | TSU 14–0 |
| 2 | 10:55 | ACU | Nik Grau 36-yard Field Goal | TSU 14–3 |
| 2 | 4:25 | ACU | Jonathan Parker 3-yard touchdown pass from John David Baker, Nik Grau kick good | TSU 14–10 |
| 2 | 0:31 | TSU | Jerome Regal 6-yard touchdown run, Blake Barnes kick good | TSU 21–10 |
| 3 | 6:00 | ACU | Charcan West 1-yard touchdown run, Nik Grau kick good | TSU 21–17 |
| 3 | 1:49 | TSU | Jeken Frye 5-yard touchdown pass from Jake Fensky, Blake Barnes kick good | TSU 28–17 |
| 4 | 12:57 | ACU | John David Baker 10-yard touchdown run, Nik Grau kick good | TSU 28–24 |
| 4 | 11:39 | ACU | Charcan West 2-yard touchdown run, Nik Grau kick good | ACU 31–28 |
| 4 | 0:04 | TSU | Blake Barnes 29-yard Field Goal | Tied 31–31 |
| OT | | ACU | Nik Grau 17-yard Field Goal | ACU 34–31 |
| OT | | TSU | Blake Barnes 34-yard Field Goal | Tied 34–34 |
| 2OT | | TSU | Jerome Regal 10-yard touchdown run, Brandon Barnes kick good | TSU 41–34 |

=== Pittsburg State ===
Abilene Christian at Pittsburg State

| Team | 1 | 2 | 3 | 4 | Total |
|---|---|---|---|---|---|
| Wildcats | 7 | 7 | 0 | 6 | 20 |
| • Gorillas | 7 | 10 | 11 | 0 | 28 |

- Date: October 5
- Location: Carnie Smith Stadium
  Pittsburg, KS
- Game start: 2:00 PM CST
- Elapsed time: 2:52
- Game attendance: 10,981
- Game weather: 56 °F (13 °C), Overcast, winds NW @ 5mph
- Referee: Dwight Neibling
- TV announcers (CAPSTV): Eddie Lomshek, Aaron McConnell & Trent Johnson

Scoring summary
| 1 | 8:52 | ACU | Tyler Chapa 32-yard Interception returned for a touchdown, Nik Grau kick good kick good | ACU 7–0 |
| 1 | 3:51 | PSU | Jeff Seybold 3-yard touchdown run, Connor Frazell kick good | Tied 7–7 |
| 2 | 9:46 | PSU | Connor Frazell 28-yard Field Goal | PSU 10–7 |
| 2 | 4:21 | PSU | Jeff Seybold 7-yard touchdown run, Connor Frazell kick good | PSU 17–7 |
| 2 | 0:11 | ACU | Taylor Gabriel 3-yard touchdown pass from John David Baker, Nik Grau kick good | PSU 17–14 |
| 3 | 8:58 | PSU | Connor Frazell 29-yard Field Goal | PSU 20–14 |
| 3 | 6:35 | PSU | Jeff seybold 8-yard touchdown run, Anthony Abenoja run for 2 | PSU 28–14 |
| 4 | 2:31 | ACU | Darrell Cantu-Harkless 7-yard touchdown pass from John David Baker, John David Baker rush failed | PSU 28–20 |

=== Houston Baptist ===
Abilene Christian at Houston Baptist

| Team | 1 | 2 | 3 | 4 | Total |
|---|---|---|---|---|---|
| • Wildcats | 20 | 21 | 21 | 7 | 69 |
| Huskies | 5 | 7 | 0 | 0 | 12 |

- Date: October 12
- Location: BBVA Compass Stadium
  Houston, TX
- Game start: 7:37 PM CST
- Elapsed time: 2:59
- Game attendance: 3,935
- Game weather: 77 °F (25 °C), Overcast, winds S @ 4mph
- Referee: Ross Smith
- TV announcers (CSNH): Brett Dolan, ND Kalu & Bart Enis

Scoring summary
| 1 | 11:22 | ACU | Darrell Cantu-Harkless 14-yard touchdown run, Nik Grau kick good | ACU 7–0 |
| 1 | 7:59 | HBU | Travis Shinn 22-yard Field Goal | ACU 7–3 |
| 1 | 4:33 | ACU | Darrell Cantu-Harkless 1-yard touchdown run, Nik Grau kick good | ACU 14–3 |
| 1 | 0:21 | ACU | Taylor Gabriel 9-yard touchdown pass from John David Baker, Thor Woerner rush fumbled | ACU 20–3 |
| 1 | 0:21 | HBU | Cody Moncure PAT return | ACU 20–5 |
| 2 | 10:07 | ACU | John David Baker 7-yard touchdown run, Nik Grau kick good | ACU 27–5 |
| 2 | 5:00 | HBU | Craig Bell 32-yard touchdown run, Travis Shinn kick good | ACU 27–12 |
| 2 | 1:16 | ACU | Noah Cheshier 3-yard touchdown pass from John David Baker, Nik Grau kick good | ACU 34–12 |
| 2 | 0:37 | ACU | Taylor Gabriel 71-yard touchdown pass from John David Baker, Nik Grau kick good | ACU 41–12 |
| 3 | 12:45 | ACU | Cade Dtone 5-yard touchdown run, Nik Grau kick good | ACU 48–12 |
| 3 | 7:59 | ACU | Taylor Gabriel 20-yard touchdown pass from John David Baker, Nik Grau kick good | ACU 55–12 |
| 3 | 0:51 | ACU | Adrian Duncan 7-yard touchdown run, Ben Hynds kick good | ACU 62–12 |
| 4 | 8:15 | ACU | Adrian Duncan 2-yard touchdown run, Ben Hynds kick good | ACU 69–12 |

=== Incarnate Word ===
Incarnate Word at Abilene Christian

| Team | 1 | 2 | 3 | 4 | Total |
|---|---|---|---|---|---|
| Cardinals | 6 | 0 | 0 | 0 | 6 |
| • Wildcats | 13 | 17 | 3 | 7 | 40 |

- Date: October 19
- Location: Shotwell Stadium
  Abilene, TX
- Game attendance: 8,119
- TV announcers (KTES-LP): Grant Boone, Lance Fleming, and Matt Sloan

=== New Mexico State ===
Abilene Christian at New Mexico State

| Team | 1 | 2 | 3 | 4 | Total |
|---|---|---|---|---|---|
| Wildcats | 3 | 19 | 0 | 7 | 29 |
| • Aggies | 7 | 14 | 0 | 13 | 34 |

- Date: October 26
- Location: Aggie Memorial Stadium
  Las Cruces, NM
- Game start: 6:07 PM MDT
- Elapsed time: 3:22
- Game attendance: 15,628
- TV announcers (ESPN3): Jay Sanderson & Danny Knee

=== Incarnate Word ===
Abilene Christian at Incarnate Word

| Team | 1 | 2 | 3 | 4 | Total |
|---|---|---|---|---|---|
| Wildcats | 0 | 0 | 0 | 0 | 0 |
| Cardinals | 0 | 0 | 0 | 0 | 0 |

- Date: November 9
- Location: Gayle and Tom Benson Stadium
  San Antonio, TX

=== Prairie View A&M ===
Abilene Christian at Prairie View A&M

| Team | 1 | 2 | 3 | 4 | Total |
|---|---|---|---|---|---|
| • Wildcats | 21 | 14 | 10 | 20 | 65 |
| Panthers | 10 | 14 | 7 | 14 | 45 |

- Date: November 16
- Location: Edward L. Blackshear Field
  Prairie View, TX

== Coaching staff ==
| Name | Position | Alma mater |
|---|---|---|
| Ken Collums | Head coach | Central Arkansas |
| Darian Dulin | Defensive coordinator | Sam Houston State |
| Nathan Young | Offensive coordinator | Abilene Christian |
| Sam Collins | Offensive line | Abilene Christian |
| Kendrick Holloway | Wide receivers | Abilene Christian |
| Andrae Rowe | Defensive line | Kansas State |
| Mark Ribaudo | Linebackers | Arizona |
| Steven Thrash | Tight ends | Texas Lutheran |
| Nick Smith | Cornerbacks | Abilene Christian |

== Broadcasts ==
All Abilene Christian games were broadcast on KTLT, also known as Sports Radio 98.1 The Ticket, and in Dallas on KBXD as part of the Abilene Christian Wildcats Cumulus radio network.

Audio and video of all home games is being offered live through Stretch Internet via ACU TV. Audio of all road games is also available through ACU TV. Locally Wildcats home games are shown on KTES-LP This TV tape delayed Tuesday nights.
