= 2013 Sam Houston State Bearkats football team =

American college football season

2013 Sam Houston State Bearkats football

FCS Playoffs Second Round vs. Southeastern Louisiana, L 29–30
- Conference: Southland Conference

Ranking
- Sports Network: No. 14
- FCS Coaches: No. 13
- Record: 9–5 (4–3 Southland)
- Head coach: Willie Fritz (4th season)
- Offensive coordinator: Doug Ruse (2nd season)
- Offensive scheme: Spread option
- Defensive coordinator: Mike Collins (1st season)
- Base defense: 3–4
- Home stadium: Bowers Stadium

2013 Southland Conference football standings
	Conf.			Overall
Team	W		L	W		L
No. 6 Southeastern Louisiana $^	7	–	0	11	–	3
No. 11 McNeese State ^	6	–	1	10	–	3
No. 14 Sam Houston State ^	4	–	3	9	–	5
Central Arkansas	4	–	3	7	–	5
Northwestern State	3	–	4	6	–	6
Lamar	2	–	5	5	–	7
Nicholls State	1	–	6	4	–	8
Stephen F. Austin	1	–	6	3	–	9
$ – Conference champion; ^ – FCS playoff participant; Rankings from The Sports Network poll

The 2013 Sam Houston State Bearkats football team represented Sam Houston State University in the 2013 NCAA Division I FCS football season. The Bearkats were led by fourth-year head coach Willie Fritz and played their home games at Bowers Stadium. They were a member of the Southland Conference.

== Before the season ==
=== 2013 recruits ===
18 recruits committed to Sam Houston State during the 2013 Spring signing days.

College recruiting information (2013)
Name	Hometown	School	Height	Weight	Commit date
Luc Swimberghe; K	Lindale, TX	Lindale	6 ft 0 in (1.83 m)	175 lb (79 kg)	
Luc Swimberghe; K	Recruit ratings: ESPN:				
Darion Flowers; WR	Tyler, TX	Tyler	5 ft 11 in (1.80 m)	160 lb (73 kg)	
Darion Flowers; WR	Recruit ratings: Rivals:				
Parker Murry; OL	Plano, TX	Plano West	6 ft 2 in (1.88 m)	275 lb (125 kg)	
Parker Murry; OL	Recruit ratings: Rivals:				
Ryne Yost; OL	Lawton, OK	Lawton	6 ft 5 in (1.96 m)	275 lb (125 kg)	
Ryne Yost; OL	Recruit ratings: Rivals:				
Aaron Sowell; OL	Katy, TX	Katy	6 ft 1 in (1.85 m)	275 lb (125 kg)	
Aaron Sowell; OL	Recruit ratings: Rivals:				
Demontrai Lewis; DE	Lufkin, TX	Lufkin	6 ft 3 in (1.91 m)	230 lb (100 kg)	
Demontrai Lewis; DE	Recruit ratings: Rivals:				
Forrest Reedy; OL	Huntsville, TX	Huntsville	6 ft 4 in (1.93 m)	297 lb (135 kg)	
Forrest Reedy; OL	Recruit ratings: Rivals:				
Luis Carreno; OG	Coppell, TX	Coppell	6 ft 2 in (1.88 m)	241 lb (109 kg)	
Luis Carreno; OG	Recruit ratings: No ratings found				
Rey Baltazar; OT	Marble Falls, Texas	Marble Falls High School	6 ft 6 in (1.98 m)	270 lb (120 kg)	
Rey Baltazar; OT	Recruit ratings: No ratings found				
John Roderique; QB	Webb City, MO	Webb City	6 ft 4 in (1.93 m)	200 lb (91 kg)	
John Roderique; QB	Recruit ratings: No ratings found				
Ragan Henderson; ILB	Rice, TX	Rice	6 ft 0 in (1.83 m)	240 lb (110 kg)	
Ragan Henderson; ILB	Recruit ratings: No ratings found				
Patrick Hall Jr; DE	Seguin, TX	Seguin	6 ft 1 in (1.85 m)	250 lb (110 kg)	
Patrick Hall Jr; DE	Recruit ratings: No ratings found				
De'Chaar Greer; RB	Waco, TX	Midway	5 ft 10 in (1.78 m)	196 lb (89 kg)	
De'Chaar Greer; RB	Recruit ratings: No ratings found				
Shyon Motlagh; WR	Heath, TX	Rockwall-Heath	6 ft 2 in (1.88 m)	185 lb (84 kg)	
Shyon Motlagh; WR	Recruit ratings: No ratings found				
Sammy Webb IV; DB	Fort Worth, TX	Arlington Heights	5 ft 10 in (1.78 m)	170 lb (77 kg)	
Sammy Webb IV; DB	Recruit ratings: No ratings found				
Tre Goodwin; OL	Tyler, TX	Tyler JC	6 ft 1 in (1.85 m)	295 lb (134 kg)	
Tre Goodwin; OL	Recruit ratings: No ratings found				
Tyrel Stokes; DB	Harker Heights, TX	Harker Heights	6 ft 0 in (1.83 m)	175 lb (79 kg)	
Tyrel Stokes; DB	Recruit ratings: No ratings found				
Jacorey Washington; DE/LB	Houston, TX	Aldine	6 ft 0 in (1.83 m)	240 lb (110 kg)	
Jacorey Washington; DE/LB	Recruit ratings: No ratings found				
Overall recruit ranking: Scout: Not Ranked Rivals: Not Ranked ESPN: Not Ranked
Note: In many cases, Scout, Rivals, 247Sports, On3, and ESPN may conflict in their listings of height and weight.; In these cases, the average was taken. ESPN grades are on a 100-point scale.; Sources: "2013 Player Commitments – Sam Houston State". ESPN.; "2013 Team Ranking". Rivals.com.

=== Orange-White Classic ===
Sam Houston State returned to the birthplace of Bearkat football, Pritchett Field, for the annual Orange-White spring game. A presentation of the Liberty Mutual Coach of the Year Award to head coach Willie Fritz took place before the game.

Quarterbacks Brian Bell, Don King III, and Rubis Requeno ran the first and second team offenses, where running backs Timothy Flanders and Keyshawn Hill saw limited action, relinquishing most of the rushing duties to backups. The game also saw former backup quarterback Chris Grett play his new position at safety.

=== Coaching changes ===
Following the spring game, it was announced that Scott Stoker would no longer be the defensive coordinator of the Bearkats, having accepted the same position at University of Texas El Paso. On May 15, 2013, Sam Houston State announced Mike Collins, former DC and Assistant Head Coach of McNeese State, would become the defensive coordinator for Sam Houston State for the 2013 season.

=== Preseason All-Americans ===
Three Sam Houston football players were named The Sports Network All-America for the 2013 season. Timothy Flanders, running back and the back-to-back Southland Conference Player of the Year, earned first team honors. Richard Sincere, the 2011 Southland Conference Offensive Player of the Year, was placed on the second team. Bookie Sneed, cornerback, was named to the third team squad.

== Schedule ==
Date	Time	Opponent	Rank	Site	TV	Result	Attendance
August 31	6:00 pm	Houston Baptist*	No. 3	Bowers Stadium; Huntsville, TX	BSN	W 74–0	9,246
September 7	6:00 pm	at No. 7 (FBS) Texas A&M*	No. 4	Kyle Field; College Station, TX	FSSW PPV	L 28–65	86,800
September 14	2:00 pm	Texas Southern*	No. 5	Bowers Stadium; Huntsville, TX	CSNH	W 55–17	6,403
September 21	6:00 pm	Incarnate Word*	No. 5	Bowers Stadium; Huntsville, TX	BSN	W 52–21	5,789
September 28	2:00 pm	No. 2 Eastern Washington*	No. 4	Bowers Stadium; Huntsville, TX	CSNH	W 49–34	8,621
October 12	2:00 pm	Lamar^{†}	No. 2	Bowers Stadium; Huntsville, TX	BSN	W 14–3	9,156
October 19	7:00 pm	at No. 9 McNeese State	No. 2	Cowboy Stadium; Lake Charles, LA	ESPN3	L 23–31	15,352
October 26	2:00 pm	Northwestern State	No. 7	Bowers Stadium; Huntsville, TX	BSN	W 44–10	5,527
November 2	3:00 pm	vs. Stephen F. Austin	No. 8	Reliant Stadium; Houston, TX (Battle of the Piney Woods)	SLCTV	W 56–49	26,213
November 9	2:00 pm	Nicholls State	No. 6	Bowers Stadium; Huntsville, TX	BSN	W 49–24	7,507
November 16	3:00 pm	at No. 14 Southeastern Louisiana	No. 4	Strawberry Stadium; Hammond, LA	SLCTV	L 21–34	7,302
November 23	3:00 pm	at Central Arkansas	No. 9	Estes Stadium; Conway, AR		L 31–49	4,227
November 30	2:00 pm	No. 22 Southern Utah*	No. 14	Bowers Stadium; Huntsville, TX (NCAA Division I First Round)	ESPN3	W 51–20	4,069
December 7	7:00 pm	at No. 7 Southeastern Louisiana*	No. 14	Strawberry Stadium; Hammond, LA (NCAA Division I Second Round)	ESPN3	L 29–30	6,874
*Non-conference game; ^{†}Homecoming; Rankings from The Sports Network Poll released prior to the game; All times are in Central time

== Game summaries ==
=== Houston Baptist ===
Houston Baptist at Sam Houston State

Team	1	2	3	4	Total
Huskies	0	0	0	0	0
• #3 Bearkats	21	28	17	8	74

- Date: August 31
- Location: Bowers Stadium
  Huntsville, TX
- Game start: 6:00PM CST
- Elapsed time: 2:57
- Game attendance: 9,246
- Referee: R Smith
- TV announcers (BSN): Charlie Farris

Scoring summary
1	11:27	SHSU	Timot Flaunders 4-yard touchdown run, Luc Swimberghe kick good	SHSU 7–0
1	8:58	SHSU	Keshawn Hill 4-yard touchdown run, Luc Swimberghe kick good	SHSU 14–0
1	6:19	SHSU	Torra Williams 66-yard touchdown reception from Brian Bell, Luc Swimberghe kick good	SHSU 21–0
2	13:16	SHSU	Josh Lyons 8-yard touchdown pass from Brian Bell, Luc Swmiberghe kick good	SHSU 28–0
2	11:38	SHSU	Shelby Davis 48-yard interception returned for touchdown, Luc Swimberghe kick good	SHSU 35–0
2	6:28	SHSU	Brian Bell 2-yard touchdown run, Luc Swimberghe kick good	SHSU 42–0
2	2:46	SHSU	Steven Hicks 4-yard touchdown run, Luc Swimberghe kick good	SHSU 49–0
3	10:44	SHSU	Luc Swimberghe 41-yard field goal	SHSU 52–0
3	9:24	SHSU	Tristan Eche 32-yard interception returned for touchdown, Luc Swimberghe kick good	SHSU 59–0
3	4:03	SHSU	Don King III 3-yard touchdown run, Brad Dunavant kick good	SHSU 66–0
4	8:11	SHSU	Team Safety	SHSU 68–0
4	3:58	SHSU	Cory Idlebird 3-yard touchdown run, Brad Dunavant kick failed	SHSU 74–0

Sam Houston faced the HBU Huskies for the first time, with HBU fielding its first football team in school history.

SHSU struck on its first possession, ending with a four-yard run by running back Timothy Flanders with 11:27 remaining in the first quarter, followed by the extra point by kicker Luc Swimberghe for a 7–0 lead. On the Bearkats' next possession, running back Keshawn Hill made a four-yard run at the 8:58-minute mark and with the extra point the score was 14–0 Bearkats. This was followed with SHSU quarterback Brian Bell making a 66-yard scoring pass to wide receiver Torrance Williams with 6:19 remaining in the quarter, and the extra point brought the score to 21–0 Bearkats.

In the second quarter, Bell made an eight-yard touchdown pass to tight end Josh Lyons, and Swimberghe's extra point raised the score to 28–0 Bearkats. On the Huskies' next possession, a pass by HBU quarterback Ka'Darius Baker was intercepted by SHSU defensive back Shelby Davis who returned the ball 48 yards for a touchdown at the 11:38 mark, and with the extra point SHSU increased its lead to 35–0. SHSU scored again with two-yard quarterback keeper by Bell at the 6:28 mark, and the Bearkats made a final score in the quarter with a four-yard run by running back Steven Hicks, which, following the extra point, had SHSU going into halftime with a 49–0 lead.

In the third quarter, Schwimberghe completed a 41-yard field goal at the 10:44-minute mark extending SHSU's lead to 52–0. The Bearkats scored less than two minutes later with linebacker Tristan Eche intercepting a pass by HBU quarterback Jonathan Fleming and returning it 32-yards for a second defensive touchdown with 9:24 remaining in the quarter, the extra point raising the lead to 59–0 Bearkats. SHSU backup quarterback Don King III made the final score of the period, a three-yard quarterback keeper which, followed by an extra point by kicker Brad Dunavant brought the score to 66–0 Bearkats.

In the fourth quarter, an error during an HBU punt led to a safety at the 8:11 mark, raising SHSU's lead to 68–0. SHSU made the final score of the game with 3:58 remaining when wide receiver Cory Idlebird made a three-yard run. The extra point attempt by Dunavant failed, and the final score was 74–0.

Sam Houston quarterback Brian Bell completed five passes out of nine attempts for 90 yards, with fellow quarterbacks Don King III and Jared Johnson failing to complete their pass attempts. Sam Houston's Steve Hicks led rushing with 17 carries for 99 yards, followed by Richard Sincere running three times for 64 yards, Cory Idlebird carrying six times for 51 yards and Timothy Flanders carrying nine times for 51 yards.

With the win, Sam Houston improves to 1–0. Sam Houston leads the all-times series 1–0.

=== Texas A&M Aggies ===
Sam Houston State at Texas A&M

Team	1	2	3	4	Total
#4 Bearkats	7	7	14	0	28
• #7 (FBS) Aggies	14	16	35	0	65

- Date: September 7
- Location: Kyle Field
  College Station, TX
- Game start: 6:06PM CST
- Elapsed time: 3:24
- Game attendance: 86,800
- Game weather: 79 °F (26 °C), Cloudy, winds SE at 8mph
- Referee: Marc Curles
- TV announcers (FSSW PPV): Bill Land, Shea Walker, & Kayce Smith

Scoring summary
1	10:52	TAMU	Tra Carson 1-yard touchdown run, Taylor Bertolet kick good	TAMU 7–0
1	7:51	SHSU	Timothy Flanders 11-yard touchdown run, Luc Swimberghe kick good	Tied 7–7
1	2:43	TAMU	Sabian Holmes 27-yard touchdown pass from Johnny Manziel, Taylor Bertolet	TAMU 14–7
2	11:31	TAMU	Ben Malena 1-yard touchdown run, Taylor Bertolet kick failed	TAMU 20–7
2	4:23	TAMU	Ja'Quay Williams 20-yard touchdown pass from Johnny Manziel, Taylor Bertolet kick good	TAMU 27–7
2	1:59	SHSU	Timothy Sanders 33-yard touchdown pass from Brian Bell, Luc Swimberghe kick good	TAMU 27–14
2	0:00	TAMU	Taylor Bertolet 35-yard Field Goal	TAMU 30–14
3	14:04	SHSU	Timothy Flanders 68-yard touchdown run, Luc Swimberghe kick good	TAMU 30–21
3	10:27	TAMU	Tra Carson 1-yard touchdown run, Taylor Bertolet kick good	TAMU 37–21
3	6:27	TAMU	Brandon Williams 10-yard touchdown pass from Johnny Manziel, Taylor Bertolet kick good	TAMU 44–21
3	6:13	SHSU	Torrance Williams 77-yard touchdown pass from Brian Bell, Luc Swimberghe kick good	TAMU 44–28
3	5:24	TAMU	Johnny Manziel 6-yard touchdown run, Taylor Bertolet kick good	TAMU 51–28
3	3:42	TAMU	Nate Askew 30-yard interception return for a touchdown, Taylor Bertolet kick good	TAMU 58–28
3	1:14	TAMU	Travis Labhart 14-yard touchdown pass from Kenny Hill, Taylor Bertolet kick good	TAMU 65–28

Sam Houston faced Texas A&M for the second consecutive year, facing the FBS powerhouse for the twelfth time. The Aggies had won all previous meetings.

The Aggies drew first blood in the first quarter, with A&M running back Tra Carson finishing a drive with a one-yard scoring run with 10:52 remaining in the period, which followed with the extra point brought the score to 7–0 Aggies. The Bearkats struck back on their next possession, with running back Timothy Flanders scoring on an 11-yard run at the 7:51-minute marker, followed by the extra point tying the score 7–7. Aggies quarterback Johnny Manziel connected with a 27-yard pass to wide receiver Sabian Holmes with less than three minutes in the quarter, putting A&M back on top 14–7.

The Aggies scored again in the second quarter at the 11:31 mark with a one-yard run by running back Ben Malena, however the extra point attempt by kicker Taylor Bertolet failed, with the new score 20–7 Aggies. A&M was again on the board at 4:23 with a 20-yard pass by Manziel to wide receiver Ja'Quay Williams, and with the extra point the new score was 27–7 Aggies. The Bearkats finally answered with a 33-yard pass by quarterback Brian Bell to Flanders, and kicker Luc Swimberghe's extra point brought the score to 27–14 Aggies. The Aggies made the final score in the period with a 35-yard field goal by Bertolet in the closing seconds, with the Aggies leading at halftime 30–14.

The Bearkats struck quickly in the third quarter, with Flanders making a 68-yard scoring running at the 14:04 mark, and the extra point reduced the Aggies lead to 30–21. Not to be outdone, the Aggies made two consecutive scoring drives, culminating with a one-yard run by Carson at the 10:27-minute mark and a ten-yard pass by Manziel to running back Brandon Williams at the 6:27-mark, raising the Aggie's lead to 44–28. The Bearkats struck again a mere 14 seconds after the previous Aggies score with Bell connecting with Torrance Williams on a 75-yard pass, bringing the score to 44–28 Aggies. After that Texas A&M kept the Bearkats from the endzone, and Manziel made a six-yard quarterback keeper at the 5:24-minute mark, Aggies linebacker Nate Askew intercepted Bell for a pick-six with 3:42 remaining in the quarter and backup Aggies quarterback connected with wide receiver Travis Labhart at the 1:14-minute mark, all together raising the lead to 65–28 Aggies.

By the fourth quarter both teams had pulled their starters and the game was a defensive standoff, both teams keeping each other from scoring. The final score was 65–28 Aggies.

Sam Houston quarterback Brian Bell completed six of 15 pass attempts for 137 yards with two interception, with fellow quarterback Don King III completing one pass for 13 yards. Sam Houston's rushing game was anchored by Timothy Flanders who ran 19 times for 170 yards including two running touchdowns, followed by Keshawn Hill who carried the ball three times for 42 yards, Richard Sincere who ran six times for 11 yards and Ryan Wilson who rushed five times for ten yards.

With the loss, Sam Houston is tied 1–1. Texas A&M leads the all-times series 12–0.

=== Texas Southern ===
Texas Southern at Sam Houston State

Team	1	2	3	4	Total
Tigers	0	3	7	7	17
• #5 Bearkats	0	27	14	14	55

- Date: September 14
- Location: Bowers Stadium
  Huntsville, TX
- Game start: 2:07 PM CST
- Elapsed time: 3:07
- Game attendance: 6,403
- Referee: D Alvarez
- TV announcers (CSNH): Brett Dolan, Eddie Robinson Jr. & Bart Enis

Scoring summary
2	12:35	TXSO	Eric Medina 27-yard Field Goal	TXSO 3–0
2	5:52	SHSU	Timothy Flanders 2-yard touchdown run, Luc Swimberghe kick good	SHSU 7–3
2	4:35	SHSU	Torrance Williams 6-yard touchdown pass from Brian Bell, Luc Swimberghe kick good	SHSU 14–3
2	1:15	SHSU	Brian Bell 3-yard touchdown run, Luc Swimberghe kick good	SHSU 21–3
2	0:19	SHSU	Timothy Flanders 1-yard touchdown run, Luc Swimberghe kick failed	SHSU 27–3
3	10:11	SHSU	Shane Young 5-yard touchdown pass from Brian Bell, Luc Swimberghe kick good	SHSU 34–3
3	4:52	SHSU	Keshawn Hill 23-yard touchdown run, Luc Swimberghe kick good	SHSU 41–3
3	4:04	TXSO	Daveonn Porter 50-yard touchdown run, Eric Medina kick good	SHSU 41–10
4	14:55	SHSU	Ragan Henderson 5-yard touchdown pass from Don King III, Luc Swimberghe kick good	SHSU 48–10
4	11:12	TXSO	Homer Causey 10-yard touchdown run, Eric Medina kick good	SHSU 48–17
4	8:13	SHSU	Ryan Wilson 1-yard touchdown run, Luc Swimberghe kick good	SHSU 55–17

The Tigers and Bearkats played each other for the second consecutive year, with the 2012 meeting being the first match between the two schools since 1997. SHSU was looking to build on its 9–5 record they had against the Tigers. The Bearkats had won 5 of the last 6 meetings.

The first quarter was a stalemate with neither team scoring, and the Bearkats struggled with their drives including one that ended with a fumble that was recovered by Texas Southern. The second quarter also started bitter for the Bearkats, with SHSU quarterback Brian Bell being intercepted twice, with the first interception being the start of a Tigers drive that ended with a 27-yard field goal by Tigers kicker Eric Medina with 12:35 remaining in the quarter, with Texas Southern leading 3–0.

However, on Texas Southern's first play following the second interception off Bell, SHSU defensive back Desmond Fite forced a fumble off Tigers running back Edward Perkins-Loving and Sam Houston began to recover, beginning a drive that ended with a two-yard rushing touchdown by SHSU running back Timothy Flanders at the 5:52-minute mark, and kicker Luc Swimberghe's extra point brought the score to 7–3 Bearkats. On Texas Southern's next possession, Tigers quarterback Homer Causey fumbled due to pressure from SHSU defensive end Andrew Weaver and Sam Houston defensive back Michael Wade recovered the ball on the Tigers 9-yard line. Bell then completed a six-yard scoring pass to SHSU wide receiver Torrance Williams with 4:35 remaining and the extra point brought the score to 14–3 Bearkats. Bell ran in a three-yard quarterback keeper at the 1:15-minute mark, and another late fumble by the Tigers on their side of the field resulted in a SHSU drive that ended with Flanders running in a one-yard score with 19 seconds remaining, however Swimberghe missed the extra point and the second quarter came to a close with Sam Houston leading 27–3 at halftime.

SHSU started the third quarter with opening drive that ended with a five-yard scoring pass from Bell to SHSU tight end Shane Young at the 10:11 mark, and the extra point raised SHSU's lead to 34–7. On SHSU's next possession, Bearkats running back Keyshawn Hill ran in a 23-yard touchdown raising the score to 41–7 Bearkats. What followed was a trade-off in scoring as Tigers running back Daveonn Porter broke free and made a 50-yard scoring dash for Texas Southern's first touchdown, and Medina's extra point made the score 41–10 Bearkats, which was the final score of the third period.

The Bearkats spent the remainder of the third period working their way down the field. This culminated in a five-yard touchdown pass from backup quarterback Don King III to SHSU tight end Ragan Henderson in the opening seconds of the fourth quarter, with Swimberghe's point after raising SHSU's lead to 48–10. The Tigers retaliated less than four minutes later with a 10-yard quarterback keeper by Causey, and the score was now 48–17 Bearkats. SHSU made one final score with SHSU running back Ryan Wilson running in a one-yard touchdown with 8:13 remaining in the quarter, and the extra point made the final score 55–17 Bearkats.

Sam Houston quarterback Brian Bell completed nine of 17 passes for 121 yards and two interceptions, and Don King III had two successful passes out of two attempts for 13 yards. Sam Houston's Timothy Flanders rushed 19 times for 108 yards, Keyshawn Hill ran seven times for 65 yards, Ryan Wilson charged six times for 37 yards and Bell ran six times for 32 yards. On receiving, Richard Sincere made three catches for 53 yards, Shane Young caught three passes for 51 yards and Chance Nelson had one reception for 15 yards.

Win the win, Sam Houston improved to 2–1. Sam Houston leads the series 10–5.

=== Incarnate Word ===
Incarnate Word at Sam Houston State

Team	1	2	3	4	Total
Cardinals	7	7	7	0	21
• #5 Bearkats	10	21	14	7	52

- Date: September 21
- Location: Bowers Stadium
  Huntsville, TX
- Game start: 6:00 PM CST
- Elapsed time: 2:50
- Game attendance: 5,789
- Game weather: 81 °F (27 °C), Fair, winds calm
- Referee: K Mar
- TV announcers (BSN): Charlie Farris

Scoring summary
1	12:29	UIW	Casey Jennings 9-yard touchdown pass from Trent Brittain, Jake Wilcox kick good	UIW 7–0
1	7:49	SHSU	Luc Swimberghe 19-yard Field Goal	UIW 7–3
1	1:43	SHSU	Chance Nelson 39-yard touchdown pass from Brian Bell, Luc Swimberghe kick good	SHSU 10–7
2	13:59	UIW	Junior Sessions 1-yard touchdown run, Jake Wilcox kick good	UIW 14–10
2	8:52	SHSU	Timothy Flanders 7-yard touchdown run, Luc Swimberghe kick good	SHSU 17–14
2	5:29	SHSU	Richard Sincere 26-yard touchdown pass from Brian Bell, Luc Swimberghe kick good	SHSU 24–14
2	1:49	SHSU	Torrance Williams 3-yard touchdown pass from Brian Bell, Luc Swimberghe kick good	SHSU 31–14
3	13:07	SHSU	Torrance Williams 16-yard touchdown pass from Brian Bell, Luc Swimberghe kick good	SHSU 38–14
3	11:33	SHSU	Timothy Flanders 41-yard touchdown run, Luc Swimberghe kick good	SHSU 45–14
3	3:08	UIW	Cole Wick 19-yard touchdown pass from Trent Brittain, Jake Wilcox kick good	SHSU 45–21
4	10:26	SHSU	Brian Bell 1-yard touchdown run, Luc Swimberghe kick good	SHSU 52–21

The Bearkats met the Cardinals for the second time, with Incarnate Word in the process of transitioning to the Southland Conference. Sam Houston won in the previous match-up.

The Cardinals started strong, scoring on their opening drive with a nine-yard pass by Cardinals quarterback Trent Brittain to wide receiver Casey Jennings at the 12:29 mark, and the extra point by kicker Jack Wilcox brought the score to 7–0 Cardinals. Sam Houston fought down to the red zone on its following possession, but Incarnate Word's defense kept the Bearkats out of the end zone and Sam Houston had to settle for a 19-yard field goal by kicker Luc Schwimberge with 7:49 remaining in the quarter, bringing the score to 7–3 Cardinals. Sam Houston scored again at the 1:49-minute mark with a 39-yard pass from Bearkats quarterback Brian Bell to wide receiver Chance Nelson to put the Bearkats ahead 10–7 at the end of the quarter.

Incarnate Word struck again early in the second quarter with a one-yard scoring run from Cardinals running back Johnny Sessions, with Wilcox's extra point making the score 14–10 Cardinals. The Bearkats answered with a seven-yard rush by running back Timothy Flanders at the 8:52 marker and the Bearkats went ahead 17–14. Sam Houston scored again with 5:29 remaining in the half on a 26-yard pass from Bell to wide receiver Richard Sincere, and again in the closing minutes of the quarter with a 39-yard pass from Bell to wide receiver Torrance Williams, and the Bearkats went into halftime leading 31–14.

The Bearkats got on the scoreboard again early in the third quarter, with Bell completing a 16-yard pass to Williams at the 13:07 mark and the extra point raising the score to 38–10 Bearkats. An interception by Bearkats safety Johntel Franklin on the Cardinals next possession gave the Bearkats control in Cardinals territory , and Flanders ran in a 41-yard touchdown with 11:33 remaining in the quarter to raise the lead to 45–14. On this run Flanders became the all-time leading rusher for the Southland Conference, beating a record set in 1997 by Southwest Texas’ Claude Mathis. The Cardinals finally answered with a 19-yard pass from Brittain to tight end Cole Wick to narrow the lead to 45–21 Bearkats. Sam Houston made the lone score in fourth quarter with a one-yard quarterback keeper by Bell at the 10:26 mark, and the final score was 52–21 Bearkats.

Sam Houston quarterback Brian Bell completed 19 of 25 passes for 285 yards, including four passing touchdowns. Timothy Flanders again led the running game with 15 carries for 157 yards, Bell rushed seven times for 35 yards, Keyshawn Hill ran six times for 25 yards and Jared Johnson ran three times for 23 yards. Bearkats receiving was anchored by Torrance Williams with nine receptions for 122 yards, Chance Nelson caught three passes for 63 yards, Richard Sincere received two for 35 yards and Gerald Thomas had one 25-yard reception.

With the win, Sam Houston improves to 3–1. Sam Houston leads the all-time series 2–0.

=== Eastern Washington ===
Eastern Washington at Sam Houston State

Team	1	2	3	4	Total
#2 Eagles	13	7	7	7	34
• #4 Bearkats	7	21	14	7	49

- Date: September 28
- Location: Bowers Stadium
  Huntsville, TX
- Game start: 3:25 CST
- Elapsed time: 2:59
- Game attendance: 8,621
- Referee: M Defee
- Television network: CSNH

Scoring summary
1	13:59	SHSU	Richard Sincere 51-yard run, Luc Swimberghe kick	SHSU 7–0
1	12:42	EWU	Demetrius Bronson 2-yard run, PAT blocked	SHSU 7–6
1	1:38	EWU	Ashton Clark 33-yard pass from Vernon Adams, Kevin Miller kick	EWU 13–7
2	14:07	SHSU	Brian Bell 8-yard run, Luc Swimberghe kick	SHSU 14–13
2	12:47	SHSU	DeAntry Loche 42-yard interception return, Luc Swimberghe kick	SHSU 21–13
2	3:39	EWU	Cooper Kupp 59-yard pass from Vernon Adams, Kevin Miller kick	SHSU 21–20
2	0:21	SHSU	Torrance Williams 18-yard pass from Brian Bell, Luc Swimberghe kick	SHSU 28–20
3	12:38	SHSU	Timothy Flanders 60-yard run, Luc Swimberghe kick	SHSU 35–20
3	9:08	EWU	Demetrius Bronson 3-yard run, Kevin Miller kick	SHSU 35–27
3	7:00	SHSU	Torrance Williams 50-yard pass from Brian Bell, Luc Swimberghe kick	SHSU 42–27
4	6:10	SHSU	Timothy Flanders 12-yard run, Luc Swimberghe kick	SHSU 49–27
4	5:20	EWU	Quincy Forte 62-yard pass from Vernon Adams, Kevin Miller kick	SHSU 49–34

Sam Houston faced the Eastern Washington Eagles in a rematch of last season's semi-final game, where SHSU managed to hold off a second-half comeback attempt by the Eagles to advance to the FCS national championship.

The start of the game was delayed nearly 90 minutes due to a thunderstorm. Sam Houston made an early statement with SHSU wide receiver Richard Sincere scoring on a 51-yard run barely one minute into the game, and kicker Luc Swimberghe's extra point made the score 7–0 Bearkats. Not to be deterred, Eastern Washington scored on its first possession with a two-yard run by Eagles running back Demitrius Bronson at the 12:42-mark, however kicker Kevin Miller's point after was blocked, and the new score was 7–6 Bearkats. The Eagles struck again with 1:38 remaining in the period on a 33-yard pass from EWU quarterback Vernon Adams to wide receiver Ashton Clark, and the Eagles took the lead 13–7 at the end of the first quarter.

The Bearkats answered early in the second quarter with a drive ending on an eight-yard quarterback keeper by SHSU quarterback Brian Bell at the 14:07 mark, and SHSU retook the lead 14–13. Eastern Washington's next drive came to an abrupt end when SHSU cornerback DeAntrey Loche intercepted a pass by Adams and returned it 42 yards for a score with 12:47 remaining in the quarter, extending the lead to 21–13 Bearkats. The Eagles got on the scoreboard again with a 59-yard pass from Adams to wide receiver Cooper Kupp at the 3:39-minute mark, closing SHSU's lead to 21–20. The Bearkats scored again in the final seconds of the quarter on an 18-yard pass from Bell to wide receiver Torrance Williams, and the period ended with the Bearkats leading 28–20 at halftime.

The Eagles went three and out on their opening possession of the third quarter, and Sam Houston made good use of its subsequent drive, culminating in a 60-yard run by SHSU running back Timothy Flanders at the 12:38-mark, stretching the lead to 35–20 Bearkats. Eastern Washington worked their way down the field again, ending the possession with a three-yard scoring run by Bronson with 9:08 remaining in the quarter to again close the gap with a new score of 35–27 Bearkats. Sam Houston moved the ball to midfield on its next drive which led to a 50-yard touchdown pass from Bell to Williams for a new score of 42–27 Bearkats at the end of the period.

What followed was back and forth possessions without scores between the two teams, starting with the Eagles having to punt to the Bearkats. Bearkats running back Keyshawn Hill fumbled late in the third quarter on the Bearkats next possession and the Eagles recovered the ball on the EWU 40 yard line. The Eagles could not capitalize on the turnover, however, as two subsequent 15-yard penalties in the fourth quarter followed by a sack forced the team to punt to the Bearkats. SHSU ended this drive with a 12-yard rush by Flanders at the 6:10-mark, raising the lead to 49–27 Bearkats. The Eagles made a final scoring drive finishing with a 62-yard pass from Adams to EWU running back Quincy Forte with 5:20 remaining in the quarter, and the new score was 49–34 Bearkats. The Eagles attempted an onside kick but SHSU wide receiver Chance Nelson recovered the ball, and the Bearkats spent the remainder of the game running the ball and the clock, ending with Bell taking a knee on the EWU 9-yard line for a final score of 49–34 Bearkats.

Sam Houston quarterback Brian Bell completed four of eight passes for 106 yards, including two touchdowns. The running game was led by Timothy Flanders who rushed 32 times for 280 yards, Richard Sincere who ran eight times for 98 yards, Bell who scrambled eight times for 45 yards and Keyshawn Hill who carried the ball four times for 17 yards. Torrance Williams caught two scoring passes for 68 yards, Ragan Henderson caught one ball for 26 yards and Chance Nelson had one 12-yard reception.

With the win, Sam Houston improves to 4–1. Sam Houston leads the all-time series 3–0.

=== Lamar ===
Lamar at Sam Houston State

Team	1	2	3	4	Total
Cardinals	0	3	0	0	3
• #2 Bearkats	0	7	7	0	14

- Date: October 12
- Location: Bowers Stadium
  Huntsville, TX
- Game start: 2:00 PM CST
- Elapsed time: 5:18
- Game attendance: 9,156
- Game weather: 87 °F (31 °C), Fair, winds SSW at 7mph
- Referee: R Christal
- Television network: BSN

Scoring summary
2	7:53	SHSU	Brian Bell 45-yard run, Luc Swimberghe kick	SHSU 7–0
2	0:10	LAM	Alex Ball 47-yard field goal	SHSU 7–3
3	2:58	SHSU	Stephen Williams 18-yard pass from Brian Bell, Luc Swimberghe kick	SHSU 14–3

Coming off a bye week, Sam Houston faced its first conference opponent of the season, the Lamar Cardinals. Sam Houston led the all-time series 24–9–1.

A highly defensive game left both team with a combined score of 17 points. Sam Houston got on the board first with a 45-yard run by SHSU quarterback Brian Bell 7:53-minute mark in the second quarter, and Luc Swimberghe's extra point made the score 7–0 Bearkats. The Cardinal's got on the scoreboard in the closing seconds of the period with a 47-yard field goal by Cardinal kicker Alex Ball, and the score at halftime was 7–3 Bearkats.

Sam Houston made the lone score of the second half, with an 18-yard pass from Bell to wide receiver Stephen Williams with 2:58 remaining in the third quarter, Swimberghe's extra point raised the Bearkat lead to 14–3. The game was delayed by two hours late in the fourth quarter because of lightning strikes, before the game ended on an incomplete Lamar pass for a final score of 14–3 Bearkats. Lamar was able to hold Flanders to under 90 yards during the game, with majority of his carries in the fourth quarter. However, wide receiver Torrance Williams had 138 yards in punt returns and the SHSU defense kept the Cardinals to only 90 rushing yards. The Bearkats in comparison rushed for 255 yards, a notable decrease compared to 382 yards against Lamar in 2011 and 378 yards in 2012.

Sam Houston quarterback Brian Bell had eight completions out of 17 attempts of 88 passing yards. Timothy Flanders led the running game with 28 rushes for 83 yards, Bell had 11 runs for 75 yards, Keyshawn Hill carried the ball six times for 35 yards and Richard Sincere ran twice for 24 yards. Stephen Williams had three receptions for 44 yards, Torrance Williams caught the ball twice for 17 yards and Chance Nelson had one reception for 10 yards.

With the win, Sam Houston improves to 5–1.

=== McNeese State ===
Sam Houston State at McNeese State

Team	1	2	3	4	Total
#2 Bearkats	3	3	3	14	23
• #9 Cowboys	7	7	7	10	31

- Date: October 19
- Location: Cowboy Stadium
  Lake Charles, LA
- Game start: 7:10 PM CST
- Elapsed time: 3:10
- Game attendance: 15,352
- Game weather: 65 °F (18 °C), Partly cloudy, winds NNW at 9mph
- Referee: A. Eck
- Television network: ESPN3

Scoring summary
1	10:40	SHSU	Luc Swimberghe 38-yard field goal	SHSU 3–0
1	6:37	MCNS	Damon Gladney Jr. 17-yard pass from Cody Stroud, Ryan Rome kick	MCNS 7–3
2	4:45	SHSU	Luc Swimberghe 30-yard field goal	MCNS 7–6
2	0:59	MCNS	Ernest Celine 29-yard pass from Cody Stroud, Ryan Rome kick	MCNS 14–6
3	6:51	SHSU	Luc Swimberghe 21-yard field goal	MCNS 14–9
3	4:39	MCNS	Marcus Wiltz 4-yard run, Ryan Rome kick	MCNS 21–9
4	14:29	SHSU	Deon Hutchinson 3-yard pass from Brian Bell, Luc Swimberghe kick	MCNS 21–16
4	10:11	MCNS	Dinotae Spencer 15-yard pass from Cody Stroud, Ryan Rome kick	MCNS 28–16
4	3:18	MCNS	Ryan Rome 33-yard field goal	MCNS 31–16
4	1:00	SHSU	Stephen Williams 18-yard pass from Brian Bell, Luc Swimberghe kick	MCNS 31–23

Sam Houston faced the McNeese State Cowboys in its second conference match-up of the season. McNeese held a commanding lead in the series, with a 25–8–1 record against the Bearkats.

Sam Houston scored first, with a 38-yard field goal by kicker Luc Swimberghe at the 10:40 mark in the first quarter to bring the score to 3–0 SHSU. McNeese answered with a 17-yard touchdown pass from quarterback Cody Stroud to wide receiver Damon Gladney Jr. with 6:37 remaining in the quarter, and kicker Ryan Rome's extra point put the Cowboys ahead 7–3.

The second quarter was quiet until the 4:45 mark when Swimberghe made a 30-yard field goal, narrowing McNeese's lead to 7–6. However, McNeese answered in the closing minute of the quarter with a 29-yard scoring pass from Stroud to wide receiver Ernest Celestie, and with the extra point McNeese led at halftime 14–6.

Continuing the theme of the previous two quarters, the Bearkats scored first in the third quarter with another Swimberghe field goal, this one a 21-yarder at the 6:51 mark and the new score was 14–9 McNeese. And again, McNeese answered a SHSU field goal with a trip to the end zone due to four-yard scoring run by running back Marcus Wiltz with 4:39 remaining in the quarter, and with the point after McNeese extended its lead to 21–9.

Sam Houston finally found the end zone in the first minute of the fourth quarter on a three-yard pass from SHSU quarterback Brian Bell to tight end Deon Hutchinson, and the extra point by Swimberge brought the score to 21–15 McNeese. The Cowboys struck back the 10:11 mark with a 15-yard pass from Stroud to wide receiver Diontae Spencer, and the new score was 28–16. McNeese then turned an interception off of a bell into an eventual field goal with 3:18 remaining, extending their lead to 31–16. Sam Houston scored on an 18-yard pass from Bell to wide receiver Stephen Williams with 1 minute remaining to narrow the lead to 31–23, however an onside kick attempt failed and McNeese ran out the clock for a final score of 31–23.

With the loss, Sam Houston fell to 5–2.

=== Northwestern State ===
Northwestern State at Sam Houston State

Team	1	2	3	4	Total
Demons	0	3	7	0	10
• #7 Bearkats	0	17	20	7	44

- Date: October 26
- Location: Bowers Stadium
  Huntsville, TX
- Game start: 2:00 PM CST
- Elapsed time: 2:46
- Game attendance: 5,527
- Game weather: 78 °F (26 °C), Sunny, winds S at 6mph
- Referee: R. Smith
- Television network: BSN

Scoring summary
2	9:42	SHSU	Luc Swimberghe 27-yard field goal	SHSU 3–0
2	7:15	NWST	Chris Moore 42-yard field goal	Tied 3–3
2	6:58	SHSU	Timothy Flanders 7-yard run, Luc Swimberghe kick	SHSU 10–3
2	1:07	SHSU	Richard Sincere 17-yard pass from Brian Bell, Luc Swimberghe kick	SHSU 17–3
3	13:39	SHSU	Torrance Williams 44-yard pass from Brian Bell, Luc Swimberghe kick	SHSU 24–3
3	5:52	SHSU	Chance Nelson 9-yard pass from Brian Bell, Luc Swimberghe kick	SHSU 31–3
3	4:51	SHSU	Brian Bell 18-yard run, PAT failed	SHSU 37–3
3	0:56	NWST	De'Mard Llorens 9-yard pass from Zach Adkins, Chris Moore kick	SHSU 37-10
4	6:24	SHSU	Steven Hicks 2-yard run, Luc Swimberghe kick	SHSU 44–10

After losing to McNeese and falling to a #7 ranking in the FCS polls, SHSU looked to lick their wounds and turned their attention to their conference opponent Northwestern State Demons. The Demons held an all-time series lead of 19–16 over the Bearkats.

For the third time this season, the Bearkats failed to put points on the board in the first quarter, with both teams exiting the first period with a blank scoreboard. SHSU finally got on the board with 9:42 remaining in the second quarter on a 45-yard field goal from kicker Luc Swimberghe, which gave SHSU a 3–0 lead. The Demons tied the score on their next possession with a 42-yard field goal from kicker Chris Moore at the 7:15 mark for a new score 3–3. An impressive 93-yard kickoff return by SHSU running back Keyshawn Hill set up the Bearkats deep in Northwestern's red zone, and SHSU running back Timothy Flanders dotted the "i" with a seven-yard scoring running at the 6:58 mark, and the new score was 10–3 Bearkats. The Bearkats got on the board again with a little more than a minute left in the quarter on a 17-yard pass from SHSU quarterback Brian Bell to wide receiver Richard Sincere, and the extra point resulted in the Bearkats leading going into halftime at 17–3.

The Bearkats got possession of the ball first to start the third quarter and quickly took advantage of it, with a 44-yard scoring pass from Bell to wide receiver Torrance Williams at the 13:39-minute-mark, and Swimberghe's kick raised the score to 24–3 SHSU. Sam Houston found the end zone again on a nine-yard pass from Bell to wide receiver Chance Nelson with 5:52 remaining, extending the lead to 31–3 Bearkats. The Demons fumbled the ball on their subsequent kickoff return and SHSU recovered the ball deep in Northwestern territory. This led to Bell making an 18-yard quarterback keeper at the 4:51 mark, however the extra point failed and the new score was 37–3 Bearkats. The Demons finally found the end zone in the closing seconds of the quarter on a nine-yard pass from Northwestern quarterback Zack Adkins to running back De'Mard Llorens, and the extra point by Moore resulted in the third quarter ending 37–10 Bearkats.

Sam Houston made the lone score of the closing quarter with two-yard run by Bearkats running back Steven Hicks, and the final score was 44–10 Bearkats.

With the win, Sam Houston improved to 6–2.

=== Stephen F. Austin ===
Stephen F. Austin vs. Sam Houston State

Team	1	2	3	4	Total
Lumberjacks	14	7	7	21	49
• #8 Bearkats	14	7	7	28	56

- Date: November 2
- Location: Reliant Stadium
  Houston, TX
- Game start: 3:05 PM CST
- Elapsed time: 3:43
- Game attendance: 26,213
- Game weather: 72 °F (22 °C)
- Referee: R. Christal
- Television network: SLC TV

Scoring summary
1	9:58	SHSU	Keshawn Hill 13-yard run, Luc Swimberghe kick	SHSU 7–0
1	6:27	SFA	Braxton Beardon 26-yard pass from Brady Attaway, Jordan Wiggs kick	Tied 7–7
1	3:21	SFA	Gus Johnson 14-yard run, Jordan Wiggs kick	SFA 14–7
1	0:03	SHSU	Timothy Flanders 11-yard run, Luc Swimberge kick	Tied 14–14
2	10:15	SFA	Keith Lawson 20-yard run, Jordan Wiggs kick	SFA 21–14
2	0:19	SHSU	Stephen Williams 15-yard pass from Brian Bell, Luc Swimberghe kick	Tied 21–21
3	11:32	SHSU	Shane Young 4-yard pass from Brian Bell, Luc Swimberge kick	SHSU 28–21
3	8:49	SFA	Mike Brooks 39-yard pass from Brady Attaway, Jordan Wiggs kick	Tied 28–28
4	14:53	SHSU	Torrance Williams 38-yard pass from Brian Bell, Luc Swimberghe kick	SHSU 35–28
4	13:16	SHSU	Keyshawn Hill 31-yard run, Luc Swimberghe kick	SHSU 42–28
4	13:01	SHSU	Ragan Henderson 16-yard pass from Brian Bell, Luc Swimberghe kick	SHSU 49–28
4	12:27	SHSU	DeAnthony Lache 45-yard interception return, Luc Swimberghe kick	SHSU 56–28
4	8:25	SFA	Mike Brooks 59-yard pass from Brady Attaway, Jordan Wiggs kick	SHSU 56–35
4	5:18	SFA	Tyler Boyd 75-yard pass from Brady Attaway, Jordan Wiggs kick	SHSU 56–42
4	1:20	SFA	Mike Brook 2-yard pass from Brady Attaway, Jordan Wiggs kick	SHSU 56–49

Sam Houston met Stephen F. Austin in its 88th meeting on nearly the 90th anniversary of the original Battle of the Piney Woods. The Bearkats led the all-time series 50–35–2 going into the game.

The Bearkats scored on their first possession which ended with a 13-yard run by SHSU running back Keshawn Hill at the 9:58-mark, and with SHSU kicker Luc Swimberghe's extra point the Bearkats led 7–0. The Lumberjacks struck back on their next possession with a 26-yard pass from SFA quarterback Brady Attaway to wide receiver Braxton Bearden with 6:27 remaining in the quarter, and SFA kicker Jordan Wigg's point after tied the score 7–7. While the Bearkats went three and out on their next possession, the Lumberjacks took advantage of their subsequent series which resulted in a 14-yard scoring run by SFA running back Gus Johnson at 3:21, and the new score was 14–7 Lumberjacks. Not to be deterred, Sam Houston scored in the closing seconds of the quarter with an 11-yard run by SHSU running back Timothy Flanders, and the first quarter ended with score tied again 14–14.

The first few minutes of the second quarter featured possession-losing fumbles by first the Lumberjacks and then the Bearkats, and the Lumberjacks turned their recovery into a 20-yard scoring run by SFA running back Keith Lawson at the 10:15-minute mark with SFA retaking the lead 21–14. Stephen F. Austin missed a field goal on its next possession, and Sam Houston scored in the closing seconds of the quarter on a 15-yard pass from SHSU quarterback Brian Bell to wide receiver Stephen Williams, and the first half came to a close with the teams again tied 21–21.

The third quarter began with Sam Houston receiving the ball, which ultimately led to a four-yard scoring pass from Bell to SHSU tight end Shane Young at the 11:32-minute mark resulting in the Bearkats leading for the first time since the first quarter 28–21. Stephen F. Austin struck back at the 8:49-mark on a 39-yard pass from Attaway to wide receiver Mike Brooks, and the scores matched 28-28. The two teams exchanged possession without scores and the quarter ended 28–28.

Sam Houston, which had begun its latest possession in the final minutes of the third quarter, scored on the first play of the fourth period with a 38-yard pass from Bell to SHSU wide receiver Torrance Williams and the Bearkats regained the lead 35–28. This was the start of a Bearkat rout, with a Lumberjacks fumble setting up a 31-yard SHSU scoring run by Hill at the 13:16-minute mark, and the score was now 42–28. Stephen F. Austin fumbled again on its next possession, the Bearkats scored quickly on 16-yard pass from Bell to wide receiver Ragan Henderson with 13:01 remaining in the quarter and SHSU extending its lead 49–28 Bearkats. SHSU cornerback DeAntrey Loche intercepted a pass by Attaway on SFA's next possession and returned it 45 yards for a defensive touchdown, and SHSU's lead raised to 56–28. Stephen F. Austin began a comeback attempt starting with a 59-yard pass from Attaway to Brooks with 8:25 remaining in the quarter, narrowing the lead to 56–35 Bearkats. The Lumberjacks scored again on a 75-yard pass from Attaway to wide receiver Tyler Boyd at the 5:18-mark at the Bearkats lead was again reduced, now 56–42. Stephen F. Austin scored on a third pass from Attaway to Brooks with 1:20 remaining in the period and the Bearkats lead dwindled to 56–49. The Lumberjacks attempted an onside kick but SHSU wide receiver Chance Nelson recovered the ball and the Bearkats ran out the remainder of the game clock with a final score 56-49.

With the win, Sam Houston improves to 7–2. Sam Houston leads the all-time series 51–35–2.

=== Nicholls State ===
Nicholls State at Sam Houston State

Team	1	2	3	4	Total
Colonels	3	0	0	21	24
• #6 Bearkats	7	14	28	0	49

- Date: November 9
- Location: Bowers Stadium
  Huntsville, TX
- Game start: 2:00 PM CST
- Elapsed time: 3:00
- Game attendance: 7,507
- Game weather: 61 °F (16 °C), Mostly cloudy, winds calm
- Referee: R. Smith
- Television network: BSN

The Bearkats returned to Bowers for their final home game of the regular season, facing the Nicholls States Colonels on Senior Day. Sam Houston led the series 16–11–1 going into the game.

Nicholls scored on its opening drive with a 37-yard field goal by Colonels kicker Andrew Dolan with 9:49 remaining in the first quarter, taking the lead 3–0. The Bearkats responded on their subsequent possession with a 16-yard rush by SHSU running back Keshawn Hill at the 7:55 mark, and with kicker Luc Swimberghe's extra point the Bearkats led 7–3.

After a series of uneventful possession by both teams, the Bearkats worked their way down the field late in the first quarter, ultimately scoring on the first play of the second quarter with a 32-yard rush by SHSU wide receiver Richard Sincere to raise the lead to 14–3 Bearkats. Sam Houston got on the board again with its next possession when SHSU quarterback Brian Bell made a 45-yard run to the end zone at the 11:31-minute mark, and the Bearkats extended their lead to 21–3. Next, the Colonels worked their way down to the Bearkats red zone, however SHSU linebacker Tanner Brock forced a fumble and the Bearkats recovered the ball. One the Colonel's next possession, SHSU cornerback Tevin Creeks intercepted a pass by Nicholls quarterback Kalen Henderson and made it back to the Nicholls 23-yard line before being tackled after time had expired, and the Bearkats led 21–3 at halftime.

Sam Houston got possession first in the third quarter and capitalized on it with a one-yard scoring run by Hill with 12:10 remaining, and the extra point increased the score to 28–3 Bearkats. On Nicholls' subsequent possession, SHSU defensive back Michael Wade intercepted a pass by Henderson and ran it back 48 yards for a defensive score, widening the gap to 35–3 Bearkats. Sam Houston scored again on its next possession when Bell hit wide receiver Torrance Williams with a short pass who managed to slip a few tackles and take it 56 yards all the way to the house with 8:43 remaining in the quarter, and the Bearkats lead stretched to 42–3. Sam Houston put in their backups and got on the scoreboard one finale time when SHSU quarterback Don King III made a 10-yard touchdown run at the 1:31 mark to extend the lead to 49–3 Bearkats.

The Colonels finally found the end zone at the 10:28 mark in the fourth quarter on a two-yard run from Nicholls running back Mike Henry, and with Dolan's extra point the new score was 49–10 Bearkats. A Bearkats fumble and personal foul late in the period gave the ball back to the Colonels, which resulted in a 46-yard scoring pass from quarterback Beaux Hebert to wide receiver Xavier Marcus, closing the gap to 49–17 Bearkats. The referees made a BS targeting call against Bearkats linebacker Eric Fieilo during a Nicholls onside kick, giving the ball back to the Colonels who subsequently made a seven-yard scoring pass from Hebert to Colonels fullback Russ Gisclair in the final minute of the game, and the final score was 49–24 Bearkats.

With the win, Sam Houston improves to 8–1. Sam Houston leads the all-times series 17–11–1.

=== Southeastern Louisiana ===
Sam Houston State at Southeastern Louisiana

Team	1	2	3	4	Total
#4 Bearkats	7	14	0	0	21
• #14 Lions	0	17	14	3	34

- Date: November 16
- Location: Strawberry Stadium
  Hammond, LA
- Television network: SLC TV

=== Central Arkansas ===
Sam Houston State at Central Arkansas

Team	1	2	3	4	Total
#9 Bearkats	3	7	14	7	31
• Bears	21	21	0	7	49

- Date: November 23
- Location: Estes Stadium
  Conway, AR

== FCS Playoffs ==
=== Southern Utah ===
Southern Utah at Sam Houston State

Team	1	2	3	4	Total
#22 Thunderbirds	10	0	10	0	20
• #14 Bearkats	7	16	7	21	51

- Date: November 30
- Location: Bowers Stadium
  Huntsville, TX

=== Southeastern Louisiana ===
Sam Houston State at Southeastern Louisiana

Team	1	2	3	4	Total
#14 Bearkats	21	2	6	0	29
• #7 Lions	7	17	0	6	30

- Date: December 7
- Location: Strawberry Stadium
  Hammond, LA
- Television network: SLC TV

== Ranking movements ==
Ranking movements Legend: ██ Increase in ranking ██ Decrease in ranking т = Tied with team above or below
	Week														
Poll	Pre	1	2	3	4	5	6	7	8	9	10	11	12	13	Final
Sports Network	3	4	5	5	4	2	2	2	7	8	6	4	9	14	14
Coaches	4	4	5	5	4	3	3	3	8–T	9	7	4	9	14	13

== Season achievements ==
On September 14 during the Sam Houston-Texas Southern game, SHSU running back Timothy Flanders surpassed the Southland Conference all-time touchdown record of 59 set by Brent Grimes of Central Arkansas.

During the September 21 contest with Incarnate Word, Flanders broke the Southland Conference all-time rushing record of 4,691 set by Claude Mathis of Texas State University (formerly Southwest Texas State University) in 1997.

Also during the Incarnate Word game, SHSU wide receiver Richard Sincere became only the second Bearkat to record more than 1,000 yards in both rushing and receiving and the eighth to break 3,000 all-purpose yards.

Running back Timothy Flanders surpassed 5,000 yards with his 280-yard performance during the upset of then-No. 2 ranked Eastern Washington University on September 28, 2013. He became the first player in the Southland Conference and the 22nd in FCS to achieve the milestone. Flanders also won both conference and national player of the week honors for his monster game.

== Roster ==
2013 Sam Houston State Bearkats football team roster
Players
Coaches
Offense

Pos.	#	Name	Class
QB	11	Brian Bell	Sr
QB	5	Chris Grett	Jr
QB		Jared Johnson	So
QB		Don King III	So
QB		Matt Merkins	Jr
RB	20	Tim Flanders	Sr
RB	25	Ridgeway Frank	Sr
RB		Steven Hicks	So
RB	26	Keyshawn Hill	Jr
RB	4	Ryan Wilson	Sr
TE		Braden King	So
TE	84	Beau Smith	Jr
TE	89	Shane Young	Jr
WR	87	Brandon Ashcraft	Jr
WR	87	Keith Blanton	Sr
WR	85	Edward Herbert	Jr
WR		Greg Johnson	Jr
WR	1	Emory Miller	Jr
WR	86	Dustin Moehlig	Jr
WR	6	Richard Sincere	Sr
WR	81	Rickey Smith	Jr
WR	9	Brandon Wilkerson	Jr
WR	82	Stephen Williams	Jr
WR	10	Torrance Williams	Sr
OL	76	Matt Boyles	Sr
OL		Brandon DeWitt	So
OL		Roclan Drain	So
OL		R. J. Earls	So
OL	71	Scott Gonzales	Jr
OL	79	Justin Havard	Jr
OL		Donald Jackson III	So
OL		Richard LoLohea	So
OL	75	Jeremy Robinson	Jr
OL		Zachary Stevens	So
OL		Shane Weeks	So
OL	72	Joey White	Jr

Defense

Pos.	#	Name	Class
CB		Shelby Davis	So
CB	42	Benjamin Griffith	Jr
CB	38	DeAntrey Loche	Sr
CB	29	Andre Moseley	Jr
CB	28	Chuks Orabuchi	Jr
CB	17	Bookie Sneed	Sr
DB		Jarell Crenshaw	So
DB		Tristan Eche	Jr
DB		Quaylon Ewing-Burton	Sr
DB	16	Desmond Fite	Jr
DB	40	Cory Hamlett	Jr
DB	31	Michael Wade	Jr
DE	34	Casey Devries	Jr
DE	55	Emmanuel Omoegbele	Jr
DE	58	Ishmael Thorns	Jr
DT	91	Preston Sanders	Sr
DL	99	Forbes Baggett	Sr
DL	97	Jarrett Brown	Sr
DL		James DeLaRosa	So
DL		Sione Latu	So
DL	66	Gary Lorance	Sr
DL	54	Gavareon Marshall	Jr
DL	95	John Trotter	Jr
LB		Mouf Adebo	So
LB	60	Dalton Bynum	Jr
LB	50	Collin Callahan	Jr
LB	37	Jeremy Jackson	Jr
LB	53	Kevin Jackson	Jr
LB		Nigel Robertson	So

Special teams

Pos.	#	Name	Class
DS	63	Ken Jones	Sr

Head coach

- Willie Fritz (Pittsburg State)

Coordinators/assistant coaches

- Doug Ruse (Northwest Missouri State)
  Offensive coordinator
- Mike Collins (Louisiana–Monroe)
  Defensive coordinator
- Matt Barrett (NC State)
  Wide receivers
- Ben Beasley (McNeese State)
  Secondary
- Johnny Jernigan (Stephen F. Austin)
  Defensive line
- Anthony Johnson (Texas)
  Running backs
- Bart Tatum (Missouri)
  Offensive line

Legend

- (C) Team captain
- (S) Suspended
- (I) Ineligible
- Injured
- Redshirt

Roster

== Media ==
All Bearkats football games were broadcast by KSAM 101.7 FM. All non-televised Bearkats home games were streamed online by the Bearkats Sports Network at gobearkats.com or ESPN3.
