= 2013 Houston Baptist Huskies football team =

American college football season

2013 Houston Baptist Huskies football
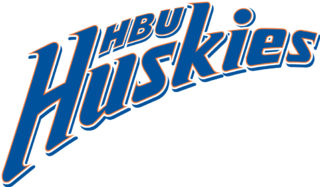
- Conference: Independent
- Record: 3–4
- Head coach: Vic Shealy (1st season)
- Offensive coordinator: Scott Smith (1st season)
- Offensive scheme: Multiple
- Co-defensive coordinators: Roger Hinshaw (1st season); Brent Vieselmeyer (1st season)
- Base defense: 4–3
- Home stadium: Crusader Stadium; BBVA Compass Stadium

2013 NCAA Division I FCS independents football standings
| | Conf. | | | Overall |
| Team | W | | L | W | | L |
|---|---|---|---|---|---|---|
| Old Dominion | | – | | 8 | – | 4 |
| Abilene Christian | | – | | 6 | – | 5 |
| Incarnate Word | | – | | 6 | – | 5 |
| Monmouth | | – | | 6 | – | 6 |
| Charlotte | | – | | 5 | – | 6 |
| Houston Baptist | | – | | 3 | – | 4 |
Abilene Christian and Incarnate Word ineligible for FCS playoffs as part of reclassification from Division II; Charlotte and Old Dominion ineligible for FCS playoffs as part of FBS transition; Houston Baptist ineligible for FCS playoffs due to playing only a partial exhibition schedule

The 2013 Houston Baptist Huskies football team represented Houston Baptist University—now known as Houston Christian University—as an independent in the 2013 NCAA Division I FCS football season. The Huskies, playing the program's first season, were led by first-year head coach Vic Shealy and compiled a record of 3–4. However, they were not considered a FCS team for scheduling purposes until 2014. They played three home games at Crusader Stadium and one home game at BBVA Compass Stadium. This was an exhibition season for the Huskies. The season did not count against the players academic eligibility, but they also were not eligible for the FCS playoffs. They played a mixed schedule of schools from the NCAA Division I Football Championship Subdivision (FCS), NCAA Division II, and the National Association of Intercollegiate Athletics (NAIA).

The Huskies joined the Southland Conference for the 2014 season and then became eligible for NCAA Division I Football Championship playoffs.

== Schedule ==
| Date | Time | Opponent | Site | TV | Result | Attendance |
|---|---|---|---|---|---|---|
| August 31 | 6:00 p.m. | at No. 3 Sam Houston State | Bowers Stadium; Huntsville, TX | | L 0–74 | 9,246 |
| September 14 | 6:00 p.m. | at Wayland Baptist | Greg Sherwood Memorial Bulldog Stadium; Plainview, TX | | W 52–28 | 4,000 |
| September 28 | 7:00 p.m. | Oklahoma Baptist | Crusader Stadium; Houston, TX | LSN | W 34–3 | 3,166 |
| October 12 | 7:30 p.m. | Abilene Christian | BBVA Compass Stadium; Houston, TX | CSNH | L 12–69 | 3,935 |
| October 26 | 7:00 p.m. | at Incarnate Word | Gayle and Tom Benson Stadium; San Antonio, TX | UIW TV | L 3–24 | 3,891 |
| November 2 | 7:00 p.m. | Texas College | Crusader Stadium; Houston, TX | | W 49–7 | 2,091 |
| November 9 | 3:00 p.m. | Texas A&M–Commerce^{†} | Crusader Stadium; Houston, TX | | L 21–55 | 2,752 |
^{†}Homecoming; Rankings from The Sports Network Poll released prior to the game; All times are in Central time

== Roster ==
2013 Houston Baptist Huskies football team roster
Players
Coaches
Offense

| Pos. | # | Name | Class |
|---|---|---|---|
| QB, WR | 2 | Darian Lazard | Jr |
| RB | 3 | Craig Bell | Fr |
| WR | 4 | Kwadre Wilson | Fr |
| RB | 5 | B. J. Kelly | Fr |
| WR | 7 | Ethan Fry | Fr |
| QB | 9 | Johnathan Fleming | So |
| TE | 10 | Maxwell Brown | So |
| WR | 11 | Zach Lazarine | Fr |
| QB | 12 | David Dunkin | Fr |
| QB | 15 | Ka'Darius Baker | Fr |
| QB | 17 | Adam Beck | Fr |
| WR | 19 | Trey Sudds | So |
| WR | 21 | Davis Iheanacho | So |
| RB | 25 | Jackie Robinson | Fr |
| RB | 28 | Jordan Charles | Fr |
| RB | 29 | Tanner Peavy | Fr |

Defense

| Pos. | # | Name | Class |
|---|---|---|---|
| CB | 6 | Ja'Halen Norris | So |
| S | 8 | Calvin Thomas | So |
| CB | 18 | Ore Bankole | So |
| S | 22 | Cody Moncure | Fr |
| CB | 23 | Prince Sam | So |
| DB | 24 | Taylor Thompson | Fr |
| S | 26 | Josh Erwin | So |
| CB | 27 | John Wesby | Jr |
| CB | 28 | Xavier Ezenagu | Fr |

Special teams

| Pos. | # | Name | Class |
|---|---|---|---|
| K | 37 | Travis Shinn | So |
| LS | 42 | Chance Talbott | So |
| LS | 51 | Danny Garza | Fr |
| P | 86 | Dylan Harriger | Fr |
| P | 89 | Christian Guzman | Fr |

Head coach

- Vic Shealy (Richmond)

Coordinators/assistant coaches

- Scott Smith (Baylor)
  Offensive coordinator, quarterbacks, assistant head coach
- Roger Henshaw (Appalachian State)
  Co-defensive coordinator, recruiting coordinator, safeties
- Brent Vieselmeyer (Concordia (WI))
  Co-defensive coordinator, linebackers
- Aaron Fletcher (East Texas A&M)
  Cornerbacks, nickels
- Burl Jordan (Texas A&M)
  Defensive line
- Shannon Kelley (Texas)
  Assistant head coach, running backs
- Jeff Love (Central Florida)
  Wide receivers
- Drew O'Daniel (Texas)
  Running game coordinator, offensive line, tight ends
- Paul Constantine (Campbell)
  Performance director

Legend

- (C) Team captain
- (S) Suspended
- (I) Ineligible
- Injured
- Redshirt

Roster

== Game summaries ==
=== At No. 3 Sam Houston State ===
Houston Baptist at Sam Houston State

| Team | 1 | 2 | 3 | 4 | Total |
|---|---|---|---|---|---|
| Huskies | 0 | 0 | 0 | 0 | 0 |
| • No. 3 Bearkats | 21 | 28 | 17 | 8 | 74 |

- Date: August 31
- Location: Bowers Stadium
  Huntsville, TX
- Game start: 6:00PM CST
- Elapsed time: 2:57
- Game attendance: 9,246
- Referee: R Smith

Scoring summary
| 1 | 11:27 | Sam Houston State | Timothy Flaunders 4 yard run (Luc Swimberghe kick), Drive: 6 plays, 46 yards, 1:43 | 0–7 |
| 1 | 8:58 | Sam Houston State | Keshawn Hill 4 yard run (Luc Swimberghe kick), Drive: 6 plays 48 yards, 2:04 | 0–14 |
| 1 | 6:19 | Sam Houston State | Torra Williams 66 yard touchdown pass from Brian Bell (Luc Swimberghe kick), Drive: 1 play, 66 yards, 0:10 | 0–21 |
| 2 | 13:16 | Sam Houston State | Josh Lyons 8 yard pass from Brian Bell (Luc Swmiberghe kick), Drive: 7 plays, 58 yards, 2:37 | 0–28 |
| 2 | 11:38 | Sam Houston State | Shelby Davis 48 yard interception returned for touchdown (Luc Swimberghe kick), Drive: 5 plays 15 yards, 1:34 | 0–35 |
| 2 | 6:28 | Sam Houston State | Brian Bell 2 yard touchdown run (Luc Swimberghe kick), Drive: 2 plays 11 yards, 0:37 | 0–42 |
| 2 | 2:46 | Sam Houston State | Steven Hicks 4 yard touchdown run (Luc Swimberghe kick), Drive: 4 plays 19 yards, 1:18 | 0–49 |
| 3 | 10:44 | Sam Houston State | Luc Swimberghe 41 yard field goal, Drive: 4 plays 3 yards, 0:39 | 0–52 |
| 3 | 9:24 | Sam Houston State | Tristan Eche 32 yard interception return (Luc Swimberghe kick), Drive: 3 plays 5 yards, 1:16 | 0–59 |
| 3 | 4:03 | Sam Houston State | Don King III 3 yard touchdown run (Brad Dunavant kick), Drive: 9 plays 58 yards, 4:24 | 0–66 |
| 4 | 8:11 | Sam Houston State | Team Safety, Drive: 4 plays -7 yards, 1:57 | 0–68 |
| 4 | 3:58 | Sam Houston State | Cory Idlebird 3 yard touchdown run (Brad Dunavant kick failed), Drive: 8 plays 50 yards, 4:13 | 0–74 |

| Statistics | HBU | SHSU |
|---|---|---|
| First downs | 7 | 23 |
| Total yards | 90 | 455 |
| Rushing yards | 45 | 365 |
| Passing yards | 45 | 90 |
| Turnovers | 3 | 1 |
| Time of possession | 31:06 | 28:54 |

| Team | Category | Player | Statistics |
|---|---|---|---|
| Houston Baptist | Passing | Ka'Darius Baker | 6/15, 33 yards, INT |
| Houston Baptist | Rushing | B. J. Kelly | 13 rushes, 45 yards |
| Houston Baptist | Receiving | Wesley Lewis | 2 receptions, 15 yards |
| Sam Houston State | Passing | Brian Bell | 5/9, 90 yards, 2 TD |
| Sam Houston State | Rushing | Steven Hicks | 17 rushes, 99 yards, TD |
| Sam Houston State | Receiving | Torra Williams | 2 receptions, 72 yards, TD |

Houston Baptist football began on the road at Division I FCS Sam Houston State. The Huskies would lose their inaugural game 74–0 to the no. 3 Bearkats.

=== At Wayland Baptist ===
Houston Baptist at Wayland Baptist

| Team | 1 | 2 | 3 | 4 | Total |
|---|---|---|---|---|---|
| • Huskies | 7 | 21 | 10 | 14 | 52 |
| Pioneers | 14 | 14 | 0 | 0 | 28 |

- Date: September 14
- Location: Greg Sherwood Memorial Bulldog Stadium
  Plainview, TX
- Game start: 6:00 PM CST
- Elapsed time: 2:50
- Game attendance: 4,000
Sources:Box score

Scoring summary
| 1 | 10:27 | Wayland Baptist | Kendall Roberson 13 yard run (Jake Higgs kick), Drive: 7 plays, 47 yards, 2:15 | 0–7 |
| 1 | 6:09 | Houston Baptist | Craig Bell 1 yard run (Travis Shinn kick), Drive: 8 plays, 43 yards, 4:08 | 7–7 |
| 1 | 0:01 | Wayland Baptist | Kendall Roberson 1 yard run (Jake Higgs kick), Drive: 11 plays, 90 yards, 3:44 | 7–14 |
| 2 | 13:18 | Houston Baptist | Terrance Hawkins 49 yard pass from Ka'Darius Baker (Travis Shinn kick), Drive: 5 plays, 68 yards, 1:43 | 14–14 |
| 2 | 11:39 | Wayland Baptist | Ashton Tillman 16 yard touchdown run (Jake Higgs kick), Drive: 6 plays, 64 yards, 1:33 | 14–21 |
| 2 | 3:44 | Houston Baptist | Craig Bell 3 yard touchdown run (Travis Shinn kick), Drive: 11 plays, 61 yards, 6:00 | 21–21 |
| 2 | 0:57 | Houston Baptist | Wesley Lewis 17 yard touchdown pass from Tanner Peavey (Travis Shinn kick), Drive: 5 plays, 66 yards, 1:59 | 28–21 |
| 2 | 0:21 | Wayland Baptist | Brendan Pegg 28yard touchdown pass from Braden Hudson (Jake Higgs kick), Drive: 5 plays, 60 yards, 0:36 | 28–28 |
| 3 | 9:54 | Houston Baptist | Travis Shinn 32 yard field goal, Drive: 9 plays, 60 yards, 5:06 | 31–28 |
| 3 | 2:00 | Houston Baptist | Darian Lazard 70 yard touchdown pass from Ka'Darius Baker (Travis Shinn kick), Drive: 2 plays, 70 yards, 0:50 | 38–28 |
| 4 | 13:37 | Houston Baptist | Craig Bell 4 yard touchdown run (Travis Shinn kick), Drive: 4 plays, 20 yards, 1:59 | 45–28 |
| 4 | 3:31 | Houston Baptist | B.J. Kelly 5 yard touchdown run (Travis Shinn kick), Drive: 14 plays, 97 yards, 8:09 | 52–28 |

| Statistics | HBU | WBU |
|---|---|---|
| First downs | 27 | 16 |
| Total yards | 648 | 274 |
| Rushing yards | 347 | 147 |
| Passing yards | 301 | 127 |
| Turnovers | 2 | 0 |
| Time of possession | 40:34 | 19:26 |

| Team | Category | Player | Statistics |
|---|---|---|---|
| Houston Baptist | Passing | Ka'Darius Baker | 17/24, 284 yards, 2 TD |
| Houston Baptist | Rushing | B. J. Kelly | 26 rushes, 178 yards, TD |
| Houston Baptist | Receiving | Darian Lazard | 7 receptions, 118 yards, TD |
| Wayland Baptist | Passing | Braden Hudson | 8/16, 61 yards, TD |
| Wayland Baptist | Rushing | Kendall Roberson | 21 rushes, 138 yards, 2 TD |
| Wayland Baptist | Receiving | Brendan Pegg | 4 receptions, 55 yards, TD |

For their second game, the Huskies traveled to NAIA Wayland Baptist. The game would be tied 28–28 at halftime, but Houston Baptist would shutout the Pioneers in the second half to win 52–28.

=== Oklahoma Baptist ===
Oklahoma Baptist at Houston Baptist

| Team | 1 | 2 | 3 | 4 | Total |
|---|---|---|---|---|---|
| Bison | 0 | 3 | 0 | 0 | 3 |
| • Huskies | 0 | 0 | 14 | 21 | 35 |

- Date: September 28
- Location: Crusader Stadium
  Houston, TX
- Game start: 7:00 PM CST
- Elapsed time: 2:45
- Game attendance: 3,166
- Game weather: 82 °F (28 °C) • Partly Cloudy • winds E @ 16mph
- Referee: Brandon Cruse
- TV announcers (LSN): Lonnie King & Jeff Power
Sources:Box score

Scoring summary
| 2 | 1:38 | Oklahoma Baptist | Austin Manger 22 yard field goal, Drive: 6 plays, 25 yards, 3:02 | 0–3 |
| 3 | 9:17 | Houston Baptist | Terrell Brown 26 yard interception return (Marty Scarberry kick) | 7–3 |
| 3 | 7:29 | Houston Baptist | B.J. Kelly 3 yard run (Marty Scarberry kick), Drive: 4 plays, 26 yards, 1:42 | 14–3 |
| 4 | 14:51 | Houston Baptist | Kameron Lecoq 25 yard fumble returned for a touchdown (Marty Scarberry kick) | 21–3 |
| 4 | 7:27 | Houston Baptist | B.J. Kelly 3 yard touchdown run (Marty Scarberry kick), Drive: 12 plays, 74 yards, 6:03 | 28–3 |
| 4 | 0:07 | Houston Baptist | Garrett Dolan 80 yard interception return (Marty Scarberry kick) | 35–3 |

| Statistics | OBU | HBU |
|---|---|---|
| First downs | 15 | 11 |
| Total yards | 249 | 367 |
| Rushing yards | 85 | 135 |
| Passing yards | 164 | 232 |
| Turnovers | 6 | 2 |
| Time of possession | 27:21 | 47:39 |

| Team | Category | Player | Statistics |
|---|---|---|---|
| Oklahoma Baptist | Passing | Cole Grauer | 16/37, 164 yards, 4 INT |
| Oklahoma Baptist | Rushing | Jordan Barnes | 12 rushes, 61 yards |
| Oklahoma Baptist | Receiving | Cody Miller | 3 receptions, 41 yards |
| Houston Baptist | Passing | Ka'Darius Baker | 16/26, 232 yards |
| Houston Baptist | Rushing | Craig Bell | 9 rushes, 58 yards |
| Houston Baptist | Receiving | Ethan Fry | 6 receptions, 75 yards |

For game 3, Houston Baptist hosted Division II Oklahoma Baptist for the program's first home game. The Huskies' defense held the Bison to just a field goal and forced six turnovers to win for the second week in-a-row.

=== Abilene Christian ===
Abilene Christian at Houston Baptist

| Team | 1 | 2 | 3 | 4 | Total |
|---|---|---|---|---|---|
| • Wildcats | 20 | 21 | 21 | 7 | 69 |
| Huskies | 5 | 7 | 0 | 0 | 12 |

- Date: October 12
- Location: BBVA Compass Stadium
  Houston, TX
- Game start: 7:37 PM CST
- Elapsed time: 2:59
- Game attendance: 3,935
- Game weather: 77 °F (25 °C) • Overcast • winds S @ 4mph
- Referee: Ross Smith
- TV announcers (CSNH): Brett Dolan, ND Kalu & Bart Enis
Sources:Box score

Scoring summary
| 1 | 11:22 | Abilene Christian | Darrell Cantu-Harkless 14 yard touchdown run (Nik Grau kick), Drive: 8 plays, 66 yards, 3:38 | 0–7 |
| 1 | 7:59 | Houston Baptist | Travis Shinn 22 yard field goal, Drive: 8 plays, 67 yards, 3:19 | 3–7 |
| 1 | 4:33 | Abilene Christian | Darrell Cantu-Harkless 1 yard touchdown run (Nik Grau kick), Drive: 7 plays, 61 yards, 3:19 | 3–14 |
| 1 | 0:21 | Abilene Christian | Taylor Gabriel 9 yard touchdown pass from John David Baker (Thor Woerner rush fumbled), Drive: 4 plays, 36 yards, 1:43 | 3–20 |
| 1 | 0:21 | Houston Baptist | Cody Moncure fumble return | 5–20 |
| 2 | 10:07 | Abilene Christian | John David Baker 7 yard touchdown run (Nik Grau kick), Drive: 4 plays, 33 yards, 1:15 | 5–27 |
| 2 | 5:00 | Houston Baptist | Craig Bell 32 yard touchdown run (Travis Shinn kick), Drive: 12 plays, 96 yards, 5:01 | 12–27 |
| 2 | 1:16 | Abilene Christian | Noah Cheshier 3 yard touchdown pass from John David Baker (Nik Grau kick), Drive: 8 plays, 85 yards, 3:36 | 12–34 |
| 2 | 0:37 | Abilene Christian | Taylor Gabriel 71 yard touchdown pass from John David Baker (Nik Grau kick), Drive: 1 play, 71 yards, 0:16 | 12–41 |
| 3 | 12:45 | Abilene Christian | Cade Dtone 5 yard touchdown run (Nik Grau kick), Drive: 5 plays, 34 yards, 2:00 | 12–48 |
| 3 | 7:59 | Abilene Christian | Taylor Gabriel 20 yard pass from John David Baker (Nik Grau kick), Drive: 7 plays, 54 yards, 2:52 | 12–55 |
| 3 | 0:51 | Abilene Christian | Adrian Duncan 7 yard run (Ben Hynds kick), Drive: 9 plays, 62 yards, 4:26 | 12–62 |
| 4 | 8:15 | Abilene Christian | Adrian Duncan 2 yard run (Ben Hynds kick), Drive: 5 plays, 50 yards, 2:15 | 12–69 |

| Statistics | ACU | HBU |
|---|---|---|
| First downs | 27 | 13 |
| Total yards | 589 | 220 |
| Rushing yards | 283 | 123 |
| Passing yards | 306 | 97 |
| Turnovers | 0 | 3 |
| Time of possession | 32:24 | 27:36 |

| Team | Category | Player | Statistics |
|---|---|---|---|
| Abilene Christian | Passing | John David Baker | 16/20, 273 yards, 4 TD |
| Abilene Christian | Rushing | Adrian Duncan | 13 rushes, 82 yards, 2 TD |
| Abilene Christian | Receiving | Taylor Gabriel | 7 receptions, 174 yards, 3 TD |
| Houston Baptist | Passing | Ka'Darius Baker | 15/22, 80 yards, INT |
| Houston Baptist | Rushing | Craig Bell | 12 rushes, 77 yards, TD |
| Houston Baptist | Receiving | Kenneth Bibbins | 6 receptions, 35 yards |

For game 4, Houston Baptist hosted the Abilene Christian Wildcats, who were in their first year of transitioning from Division II to Division I FCS.

=== At Incarnate Word ===
Houston Baptist at Incarnate Word

| Team | 1 | 2 | 3 | 4 | Total |
|---|---|---|---|---|---|
| Huskies | 0 | 0 | 3 | 0 | 3 |
| • Cardinals | 3 | 14 | 0 | 7 | 24 |

- Date: October 26
- Location: Gayle and Tom Benson Stadium
  San Antonio, TX
- Game start: 6:00 PM CST
- Elapsed time: 2:42
- Game attendance: 3,891
- Game weather: 70 °F (21 °C) • Partly cloudy • calm winds
- Referee: Kevin Hassell
Sources:Box score

Scoring summary
| 1 | 8:35 | Incarnate Word | Jake Wilcox 38 yard field goal, Drive: 9 plays, 12 yards, 4:21 | 0–3 |
| 2 | 8:55 | Incarnate Word | Clint Killough 31 yard pass from Trent Brittain (Jake Wilcox kick), Drive: 10 plays, 82 yards, 5:48 | 0-10 |
| 2 | 1:30 | Incarnate Word | John Olgesby 4 yard run (Jake Wilcox kick), Drive: 9 plays, 88 yards, 4:08 | 0–17 |
| 3 | 11:15 | Houston Baptist | Travis Shinn 19 yard field goal, Drive: 11 plays, 77 yards, 3:39 | 3–17 |
| 4 | 12:08 | Incarnate Word | Matt Bass 1 yard run (Jake Wilcox kick), Drive: 6 plays, 36 yards, 1:58 | 3–24 |

| Statistics | HBU | UIW |
|---|---|---|
| First downs | 12 | 21 |
| Total yards | 220 | 370 |
| Rushing yards | 45 | 195 |
| Passing yards | 175 | 175 |
| Turnovers | 3 | 0 |
| Time of possession | 22:56 | 37:04 |

| Team | Category | Player | Statistics |
|---|---|---|---|
| Houston Baptist | Passing | Ka'Darius Baker | 16/33, 175 yards, INT |
| Houston Baptist | Rushing | Darian Lazard | 4 rushes, 21 yards |
| Houston Baptist | Receiving | Darian Lazard | 5 receptions, 64 yards |
| Incarnate Word | Passing | Trent Brittain | 13/21, 164 yards, TD |
| Incarnate Word | Rushing | Junio Sessions | 18 rushes, 115 yards |
| Incarnate Word | Receiving | Clint Killough | 5 receptions, 67 yards, TD |

For the second week in a row, the Huskies played an opponent who was in the first year of transitioning from Division II to Division I FCS.

=== Texas College ===
Texas College at Houston Baptist

| Team | 1 | 2 | 3 | 4 | Total |
|---|---|---|---|---|---|
| Steers | 0 | 0 | 0 | 7 | 7 |
| • Huskies | 14 | 21 | 7 | 7 | 49 |

- Date: November 2
- Location: Crusader Stadium
  Houston, TX
- Game start: 6:00 PM CST
- Elapsed time: 2:42
- Game attendance: 2,091
- Game weather: 71 °F (22 °C) • Clear • 0 mph
- Referee: Eddy Shelton
Sources:Box score

Scoring summary
| 1 | 10:39 | Houston Baptist | Craig Bell Jr. 4 yard run (Travis Shinn kick), Drive: 10 plays, 75 yards, 4:21 | 7–0 |
| 1 | 9:12 | Houston Baptist | Taylor Thompson 46 yard interception return (Travis Shinn kick), Drive: 3 plays 8 yards, 1:17 | 14–0 |
| 2 | 3:56 | Houston Baptist | B.J. Kelly 9 yard run (Travis Shinn kick), Drive: 6 plays, 41 yards, 2:45 | 21–0 |
| 2 | 0:39 | Houston Baptist | Larry Day 1 yard run (Travis Shinn kick), Drive: 6 plays, 37 yards, 1:25 | 28–0 |
| 2 | 0:12 | Houston Baptist | Wesley Lewis 38 yard pass from Ka'Darius Baker (Traviss Shinn kick), Drive: 1 play, 38 yards, 0:07 | 35–0 |
| 3 | 0:25 | Houston Baptist | Larry Day 3 yard run (Travis Shinn kick), Drive: 10 plays, 49 yards, 4:34 | 42–0 |
| 4 | 11:39 | Houston Baptist | Jackie Robinson Jr. 45 yard run (Travis Shinn kick), Drive: 1 play, 45 yards, 0:10 | 49–0 |
| 4 | 4:26 | Texas College | Curtez Griffin 1 yard run (Erick Trigueros kick), Drive: 15 plays, 69 yards, 7:16 | 49–7 |

| Statistics | TC | HBU |
|---|---|---|
| First downs | | |
| Total yards | | |
| Rushing yards | | |
| Passing yards | | |
| Turnovers | | |
| Time of possession | | |

| Team | Category | Player | Statistics |
|---|---|---|---|
| Texas College | Passing | | |
| Texas College | Rushing | | |
| Texas College | Receiving | | |
| Houston Baptist | Passing | | |
| Houston Baptist | Rushing | | |
| Houston Baptist | Receiving | | |

=== Texas A&M–Commerce ===
Texas A&M-Commerce at Houston Baptist

| Team | 1 | 2 | 3 | 4 | Total |
|---|---|---|---|---|---|
| • Lions | 21 | 20 | 7 | 7 | 55 |
| Huskies | 14 | 0 | 7 | 0 | 21 |

- Date: November 9
- Location: Crusader Stadium
  Houston, TX
- Game start: 6:00 PM MST
- Elapsed time: 3:08
- Game attendance: 2,752
- Game weather: 70 °F (21 °C) • Cloudy • Calm
- Referee: Brandon Cruse
Sources:Box score

Scoring summary
| 1 | 14:04 | Texas A&M–Commerce | Seth Smith 45 yard pass from Harrison Stewart (Saul Martinez kick), Drive: 3 plays, 72 yards, 0:56 | 0–7 |
| 1 | 12:34 | Texas A&M–Commerce | Pablo Vasquez 84 yard fumble return (Saul Martinez kick) | 0–14 |
| 1 | 9:38 | Houston Baptist | Larry Day 6 yard run (Travis Shinn kick), Drive: 3 plays, 81 yards, 0:42 | 7–14 |
| 1 | 4:19 | Houston Baptist | Wesley Lewis 25 yard pass from Ka'Darius Baker (Travis Shinn kick), Drive: 7 plays, 49 yards, 3:27 | 14–14 |
| 1 | 0:56 | Texas A&M–Commerce | Hayden Marsh 12 yard pass from Harrison Stewart (Saul Martinez kick), Drive: 11 plays, 66 yards, 3:19 | 14–21 |
| 2 | 13:39 | Texas A&M–Commerce | Saul Martinez 26 yard field goal, Drive: 5 plays, 53 yards, 1:08 | 14–24 |
| 2 | 12:27 | Texas A&M–Commerce | Saul Martinez 35 yard field goal, Drive: 7 plays, 11 yards, 1:12 | 14–27 |
| 2 | 4:10 | Texas A&M–Commerce | Seth Smith 34 yard pass from Harrison Stewart (Saul Martinez kick), Drive: 5 plays, 97 yards, 1:37 | 14–34 |
| 2 | 0:36 | Texas A&M–Commerce | Jordon Jenkins 3 yard pass from Deric Davis (Saul Martinez kick), Drive: 7 plays, 49 yards, 2:02 | 14–41 |
| 3 | 4:20 | Houston Baptist | B.J. Kelly 1 yard run (Travis Shinn kick), Drive: 11 plays, 54 yards, 5:16 | 21–41 |
| 3 | 3:36 | Texas A&M–Commerce | Seth Smith 16 yard pass from Harrison Stewart (Saul Martinez kick), Drive: 3 plays, 69 yards, 0:44 | 21–48 |
| 4 | 13:56 | Texas A&M–Commerce | Stacy Howard 32 yard pass from Harrison Stewart (Saul Martinez kick), Drive: 4 plays, 65 yards, 1:25 | 21–55 |

| Statistics | TAMUC | HBU |
|---|---|---|
| First downs | | |
| Total yards | | |
| Rushing yards | | |
| Passing yards | | |
| Turnovers | | |
| Time of possession | | |

| Team | Category | Player | Statistics |
|---|---|---|---|
| Texas A&M–Commerce | Passing | | |
| Texas A&M–Commerce | Rushing | | |
| Texas A&M–Commerce | Receiving | | |
| Houston Baptist | Passing | | |
| Houston Baptist | Rushing | | |
| Houston Baptist | Receiving | | |

== Audio streaming ==
All Houston Baptist games were streamed online by the Legacy Sports Network.
