= 2013 Incarnate Word Cardinals football team =

American college football season

2013 Incarnate Word Cardinals football
- Conference: Independent
- Record: 6–5
- Head coach: Larry Kennan (2nd season)
- Offensive coordinator: Tony Marciano (4th season)
- Offensive scheme: Multiple
- Defensive coordinator: Brian Gamble (2nd season)
- Base defense: 3–4
- Home stadium: Gayle and Tom Benson Stadium

2013 NCAA Division I FCS independents football standings
	Conf.			Overall
Team	W		L	W		L
Old Dominion		–		8	–	4
Abilene Christian		–		6	–	5
Incarnate Word		–		6	–	5
Monmouth		–		6	–	6
Charlotte		–		5	–	6
Houston Baptist		–		3	–	4
Abilene Christian and Incarnate Word ineligible for FCS playoffs as part of reclassification from Division II; Charlotte and Old Dominion ineligible for FCS playoffs as part of FBS transition; Houston Baptist ineligible for FCS playoffs due to playing only a partial exhibition schedule

The 2013 Incarnate Word Cardinals football team represented the University of the Incarnate Word in the 2013 NCAA Division I FCS football season. The Cardinals played their first season of a transition to the FCS level. However, they were not considered a FCS team for scheduling purposes until 2014. They were led by second-year head coach Larry Kennan. Home games were played at Gayle and Tom Benson Stadium. This was a transition season for the Cardinals. As a transitioning school from D2 to D1, the Cardinals were ineligible for the FCS Playoffs and the D2 playoffs. They played a mixed schedule of schools from the FCS, NAIA, and D-II. The Cardinals joined the Southland Conference for football in the 2014 season, and it counted as the 2nd year in a 4-year transition into the D1 level that will make them eligible for the FCS Playoffs in 2017–18. They finished the season 6–5.

== Schedule ==
Date	Time	Opponent	Site	TV	Result	Attendance
August 29	7:00 pm	at No. 7 Central Arkansas	Estes Stadium; Conway, AR	UCA Showcase	L 7–58	10,455
September 7	6:00 pm	Texas College	Gayle and Tom Benson Stadium; San Antonio, TX	UIW TV	W 69–0	3,927
September 14	7:00 pm	Langston	Gayle and Tom Benson Stadium; San Antonio, TX	UIW TV	W 24–0	3,417
September 21	7:00 pm	at No. 5 Sam Houston State	Bowers Stadium; Huntsville, TX	BSN	L 21–52	5,789
September 28	6:00 pm	Eastern New Mexico	Gayle and Tom Benson Stadium; San Antonio, TX	UIW TV	W 33–26	3,752
October 5	7:00 pm	at Southeastern Louisiana	Strawberry Stadium; Hammond, LA	Southeastern Channel*	L 3–35	4,235
October 19	2:00 pm	at Abilene Christian	Shotwell Stadium; Abilene, TX	KTES-LP*	L 6–40	8,119
October 26	6:00 pm	Houston Baptist	Gayle and Tom Benson Stadium; San Antonio, TX	UIW TV	W 24–3	3,891
November 2	2:00 pm	at McMurry	Wilford Moore Stadium; Abilene, TX		W 47–43	1,713
November 9	2:00 pm	Abilene Christian	Gayle and Tom Benson Stadium; San Antonio, TX	UIW TV	W 34–31	3,517
November 16	2:00 pm	Angelo State	Gayle and Tom Benson Stadium; San Antonio, TX	UIW TV	L 0–7	4,122
Rankings from The Sports Network Poll released prior to the game; All times are in Central time

*Tape delayed broadcast

== Game summaries ==
=== At No. 7 Central Arkansas ===
Incarnate Word at Central Arkansas

Team	1	2	3	4	Total
Cardinals	0	0	0	7	7
• No. 7 Bears	16	14	14	14	58

- Date: August 29
- Location: Estes Stadium
  Conway, AR
- Game start: 7:00 p.m. CST
- Elapsed time: 3:05
- Game attendance: 10,455
- Game weather: 97 °F (36 °C) • Clear
- Referee: Ken Ray
- TV announcers (UCA Gameday): Steve Sullivan, Justin Acri, and Monty Powell
Sources: Box Score

Scoring summary
1	10:18	Central Arkansas	Blake Veasley 11 yard run (Eddie Camara kick failed), Drive: 10 plays, 70 yards, 4:42	0–6
1	7:21	Central Arkansas	Blake Veasley 18 yard run (Eddie Camara kick), Drive: 6 plays, 59 yards, 2:30	0–13
1	1:39	Central Arkansas	Eddie Camara 42 yard field goal, Drive: 9 plays, 34 yards, 2:59	0–16
2	7:36	Central Arkansas	Jatavio Wilson 29 yard pass from Wynri Smothers (Eddie Camara kick), Drive: 9 plays, 77 yards, 4:13	0–23
2	2:36	Central Arkansas	Danze Williams 1 yard run (Eddie Camara kick), Drive: 9 plays, 72 yards, 3:54	0–30
3	12:59	Central Arkansas	Desmond Smith 0 yard blocked punt return (Eddie Camara kick)	0–37
3	0:09	Central Arkansas	Danze Williams 3 yard run (Eddie Camara kick), Drive: 11 plays, 80 yards, 4:45	0–44
4	6:02	Central Arkansas	Jatavio Wilson 36 yard pass from Taylor Reed (Eddie Camara kick), Drive: 5 plays, 50 yards, 2:12	0–51
4	4:00	Incarnate Word	Trent Brittain 38 yard run (Jake Wilcox kick), Drive: 6 plays, 68 yards, 1:55	7–51
4	3:44	Central Arkansas	Jatavio Wilson 93 yard kickoff return (Eddie Camara kick)	7–58

=== Texas College ===
Texas College at Incarnate Word

Team	1	2	3	4	Total
Steers	0	0	0	0	0
• Cardinals	14	28	17	10	69

- Date: September 7
- Location: Gayle and Tom Benson Stadium
  San Antonio, TX
- Game start: 6:00 PM CST
- Elapsed time: 3:00
- Game attendance: 3,927
- Game weather: 93 °F (34 °C), Partly Cloudy
- Referee: Kevin Hassell
- Television network: UIW TV

Scoring summary
1	13:17	UIW	Matt Bass 1-yard touchdown run, Jake Wilcox kick good	UIW 7–0
1	8:18	UIW	Matt Bass 16-yard touchdown pass from Trent Brittain, Jake Wilcox kick good	UIW 14–0
2	14:28	UIW	Daryl Brooks 31-yard touchdown pass from Trent Brittain, Jake Wilcox kick good	UIW 21–0
2	11:29	UIW	Broderick Reeves 5-yard touchdown run, Jake Wilcox kick good	UIW 28–0
2	4:10	UIW	JR Sessions 6-yard touchdown run, Jake Wilcox kick good	UIW 35–0
2	0:08	UIW	Matt Bass 2-yard touchdown pass from Trent Brittain, Jake Wilcox kick good	UIW 42–0
3	11:50	UIW	Matt Bass 2-yard touchdown run, Jake Wilcox kick good	UIW 49–0
3	8:06	UIW	Broderick Reeves 22-yard touchdown run, Jake Wilcox kick good	UIW 56–0
3	1:38	UIW	Jake Wilcox 35-yard Field Goal	UIW 59–0
4	10:55	UIW	Jake Wilcox 39-yard Field Goal	UIW 62–0
4	8:25	UIW	John Oglesby 2-yard touchdown run, Jake Wilcox kick good	UIW 69–0

=== Langston ===
Langston at Incarnate Word

Team	1	2	3	4	Total
Lions	0	0	0	0	0
• Cardinals	15	6	3	0	24

- Date: September 14
- Location: Gayle and Tom Benson Stadium
  San Antonio, TX
- Game start: 6:00 PM CST
- Elapsed time: 2:41
- Game attendance: 3,417
- Game weather: 95 °F (35 °C), Partly Cloudy, winds ESE @ 14 mph (23 km/h)
- Referee: Brian Alos
- Television network: UIW TV

Scoring summary
1	13:25	UIW	Team Safety	UIW 2–0
1	8:22	UIW	Junior Sessions 2-yard touchdown run, Jake Wilcox kick good	UIW 9–0
1	5:39	UIW	Matt Bass 1-yard touchdown run, Jake Wilcox failed	UIW 15–0
2	4:17	UIW	Casey Jennings 35-yard touchdown pass from Trent Brittain, Jake Wilcox kick failed	UIW 21–0
3	12:21	UIW	Jake Wilcox 27-yard Field Goal	UIW 24–0

=== At No. 5 Sam Houston State ===
Incarnate Word at Sam Houston State

Team	1	2	3	4	Total
Cardinals	7	7	7	0	21
• No. 5 Bearkats	10	21	14	7	52

- Date: September 21
- Location: Bowers Stadium
  Huntsville, TX
- Game start: 6:00 PM CST
- Elapsed time: 2:50
- Game attendance: 5,789
- Referee: K Mar
- TV announcers (BSN): Charlie Farris

Scoring summary
1	12:29	Incarnate Word	Casey Jennings 9-yard touchdown pass from Trent Brittain, Jake Wilcox kick good	7–0
1	7:49	Sam Houston State	Luc Swimberghe 19-yard Field Goal	7–3
1	1:43	Sam Houston State	Chance Nelson 39-yard touchdown pass from Brian Bell, Luc Swimberghe kick good	7–10
2	13:59	Incarnate Word	Junior Sessions 1-yard touchdown run, Jake Wilcox kick good	14–10
2	8:52	Sam Houston State	Timothy Flanders 7-yard touchdown run, Luc Swimberghe kick good	14–17
2	5:29	Sam Houston State	Richard Sincere 26-yard touchdown pass from Brian Bell, Luc Swimberghe kick good	14–24
2	1:49	Sam Houston State	Torrance Williams 3-yard touchdown pass from Brian Bell, Luc Swimberghe kick good	14–31
3	13:07	Sam Houston State	Torrance Williams 16-yard touchdown pass from Brian Bell, Luc Swimberghe kick good	14–38
3	11:33	Sam Houston State	Timothy Flanders 41-yard touchdown run, Luc Swimberghe kick good	14–45
3	3:08	Incarnate Word	Cole Wick 19-yard touchdown pass from Trent Brittain, Jake Wilcox kick good	21–45
4	10:26	Sam Houston State	Brian Bell 1-yard touchdown run, Luc Swimberghe kick good	21–52

=== Eastern New Mexico ===
Eastern New Mexico at Incarnate Word

Team	1	2	3	4	Total
Greyhounds	7	2	7	10	26
• Cardinals	10	16	0	7	33

- Date: September 28
- Location: Gayle and Tom Benson Stadium
  San Antonio, TX
- Game start: 6:00 PM CST
- Elapsed time: 4:02
- Game attendance: 3,752
- Game weather: 84 °F (29 °C), Drizzly
- Referee: Ross Smith
- Television network: UIW TV

Scoring summary
1	12:29	UIW	Matt Bass 2-yard touchdown run, Jake Wilcox kick good	UIW 7–0
1	8:54	UIW	Jake Wilcox 25-yard Field Goal	UIW 10–0
1	4:11	ENMU	Myles Johnson 34-yard touchdown pass from Jeremy Buurma, Mitchell Cox kick good	UIW 10–7
2	11:25	UIW	Jake Wilcox 23-yard Field Goal	UIW 13–7
2	9:39	UIW	Junior Sessions 89-yard touchdown run, Jake Wilcox kick good	UIW 20–7
2	3:16	UIW	Clint Killough 90-yard touchdown pass from Trent Brittain, Jake Wilcox kick blocked	UIW 26–7
2	3:16	ENMU	David Strickland returns blocked PAT for 2	UIW 26–9
3	4:35	ENMU	Vaughn Johnson 1-yard touchdown run, Mitchell Cox kick good	UIW 26–16
4	8:55	ENMU	Christian long 1-yard touchdown run, Mitchell Cox kick good	UIW 26–23
4	3:17	UIW	Junior Sessions 1-yard touchdown run, Jake Wilcox kick good	UIW 33–23
4	1:50	ENMU	Mitchell Cox 48-yard Field Goal	UIW 33–26

=== At Southeastern Louisiana ===
Incarnate Word at Southeastern Louisiana

Team	1	2	3	4	Total
Cardinals	0	3	0	0	3
• Lions	14	7	7	7	35

- Date: October 5
- Location: Strawberry Stadium
  Hammond, LA
- Game start: 7:00 PM CST
- Elapsed time: 2:49
- Game attendance: 4,235
- Referee: Ken Ray
- TV announcers (Southeastern Channel): Chris Coleman, Allen Waddell, &

Scoring summary
1	13:12	SLU	Marquis Hayes 41-yard touchdown pass from Bryan Bennett, Seth Sebastian kick good	SLU 7–0
1	0:57	SLU	Rasheed Harrell 5-yard touchdown run, Seth Sebastian kick good	SLU 14–0
2	8:30	UIW	Jake Wilcox 42-yard Field Goal	SLU 14–3
2	0:03	SLU	Marice Sutton 67-yard Interception returned for a touchdown, Seth Sebastian kick good	SLU 21–3
3	5:10	SLU	Bryan Bennett 1-yard touchdown run, Seth Sebastian kick good	SLU 28–3
4	7:38	SLU	Jeff Smiley 17-yard touchdown pass from Bryan Bennett, Seth Sebastian kick good	SLU 35–3

=== At Abilene Christian ===
Incarnate Word at Abilene Christian

Team	1	2	3	4	Total
Cardinals	6	0	0	0	6
• Wildcats	13	17	3	7	40

- Date: October 19
- Location: Shotwell Stadium
  Abilene, TX
- Game attendance: 8,119
- TV announcers (KTES): Grant Boone, Lance Fleming, and Matt Sloan

=== Houston Baptist ===
Houston Baptist at Incarnate Word

Team	1	2	3	4	Total
Huskies	0	0	3	0	3
• Cardinals	3	14	0	7	24

- Date: October 26
- Location: Gayle and Tom Benson Stadium
  San Antonio, TX
- Game attendance: 3,891
- Television network: UIW TV

=== At McMurry ===
Incarnate Word at McMurry

Team	1	2	3	4	Total
• Cardinals	13	0	13	21	47
War Hawks	6	14	14	9	43

- Date: November 2
- Location: Wilford Moore Stadium
  Abilene, TX
- Game attendance: 1,713

=== Abilene Christian ===
Abilene Christian at Incarnate Word

Team	1	2	3	4	Total
Wildcats	7	7	17	0	31
• Cardinals	7	14	0	13	34

- Date: November 9
- Location: Gayle and Tom Benson Stadium
  San Antonio, TX
- Television network: UIW TV

=== Angelo State ===
Angelo State at Incarnate Word

Team	1	2	3	4	Total
• Rams	0	0	7	0	7
Cardinals	0	0	0	0	0

- Date: November 16
- Location: Gayle and Tom Benson Stadium
  San Antonio, TX
- Television network: UIW TV

== Audio streaming ==
All Incarnate Word games were broadcast on KKYX with the voices of Gabe Farias and Shawn Morris. KKYX's broadcasts were available at their website. KUIW Radio produced a student media broadcast every week, that is available online, and they provided streaming of all non-televised home games were shown via UIW TV.
