= 2013 Old Dominion Monarchs football team =

American college football season

2013 Old Dominion Monarchs football
- Conference: Independent
- Record: 8–4
- Head coach: Bobby Wilder (5th season)
- Offensive coordinator: Brian Scott (5th season)
- Offensive scheme: Hurry-up spread option
- Defensive coordinator: Rich Nagy (1st season)
- Base defense: 3–3–5
- Home stadium: Foreman Field at S. B. Ballard Stadium

2013 NCAA Division I FCS independents football standings
	Conf.			Overall
Team	W		L	W		L
Old Dominion		–		8	–	4
Abilene Christian		–		6	–	5
Incarnate Word		–		6	–	5
Monmouth		–		6	–	6
Charlotte		–		5	–	6
Houston Baptist		–		3	–	4
Abilene Christian and Incarnate Word ineligible for FCS playoffs as part of reclassification from Division II; Charlotte and Old Dominion ineligible for FCS playoffs as part of FBS transition; Houston Baptist ineligible for FCS playoffs due to playing only a partial exhibition schedule

The 2013 Old Dominion Monarchs football team represented Old Dominion University in the 2013 NCAA Division I FCS football season. They were led by fifth-year head coach Bobby Wilder and played their home games at Foreman Field at S. B. Ballard Stadium. This season was season one of a two-year transition to the NCAA Division I Football Bowl Subdivision (FBS), where the Monarchs became a member of Conference USA (C-USA) in 2014. As a result, the Monarchs competed as a FCS independent and were ineligible for the FCS playoffs.

== Schedule ==
Date	Time	Opponent	Site	TV	Result	Attendance
August 31	7:00 p.m.	at East Carolina	Dowdy–Ficklen Stadium; Greenville, NC	FCS	L 38–52	44,597
September 7	4:00 p.m.	at Maryland	Byrd Stadium; College Park, MD	ESPNews	L 10–47	38,377
September 14	6:00 p.m.	Howard	Foreman Field; Norfolk, VA		W 76–19	20,118
September 21	6:00 p.m.	The Citadel	Foreman Field; Norfolk, VA	COX	W 59–58	20,118
September 28	6:00 p.m.	Albany	Foreman Field; Norfolk, VA (Oyster Bowl)		W 66–10	20,118
October 5	6:00 p.m.	Liberty^{†}	Foreman Field; Norfolk, VA	COX	W 21–17	20,118
October 19	7:00 p.m.	at Pittsburgh	Heinz Field; Pittsburgh, PA	ACCRSN	L 24–35	38,462
October 26	1:00 p.m.	at Norfolk State	William "Dick" Price Stadium; Norfolk, VA (rivalry)		W 27–24	11,308
November 2	2:00 p.m.	Rhode Island	Foreman Field; Norfolk, VA		W 66–14	20,118
November 9	5:00 p.m.	at Idaho	Kibbie Dome; Moscow, ID		W 59–38	14,489
November 16	1:00 p.m.	Campbell	Foreman Field; Norfolk, VA		W 42–14	20,118
November 23	12:00 p.m.	at North Carolina	Kenan Memorial Stadium; Chapel Hill, NC	ACCRSN	L 20–80	41,500
^{†}Homecoming; All times are in Eastern time

== All Independent Team ==
- Coach of the Year - Bobby Wilder
- Offensive Player of the Year - Taylor Heinicke, QB
