= Ken Collums =

American football player and coach (born 1972)

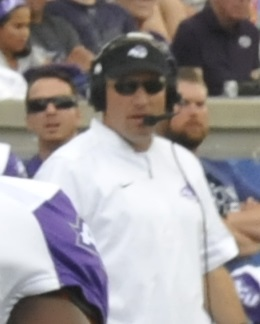
- Collums (wearing headset) in 2016 at Falcon Stadium

Current position
- Title: Assistant head coach & tight ends coach
- Team: Central Arkansas
- Conference: SLC

Biographical details
- Born: September 15, 1972 (age 54); Vernon, Texas, U.S.

Playing career
- 1991–1994: Central Arkansas
- Position: Quarterback

Coaching career (HC unless noted)
- 1996–1997: Central Arkansas (GA)
- 1998–1999: Abilene Christian (QB/WR)
- 2000–2001: Central Arkansas (QB)
- 2002–2004: Central Arkansas (OC/QB)
- 2005–2011: Abilene Christian (OC/QB)
- 2012–2016: Abilene Christian
- 2018–2024: Central Arkansas (OC/QB)
- 2025–present: Central Arkansas (AHC/TE)

Head coaching record
- Overall: 24–32

Kenneth Layne Collums (born September 15, 1972) is an American college football coach and former player. He is the assistant head coach & tight ends coach the University of Central Arkansas, positions he has held since 2025. Collums served as the head football coach at Abilene Christian University from 2012 to 2016, compiling a record of 24–32. Prior to his promotion to head coach, for seven seasons he was the Wildcats' offensive coordinator. As a student-athlete, Collums was a four-year starting quarterback for the Central Arkansas, leading the Bears to the NAIA Division I Football Championship in 1991.

== Head coaching record ==
Year	Team	Overall	Conference	Standing	Bowl/playoffs
Abilene Christian Wildcats (Lone Star Conference) (2012)
2012	Abilene Christian	7–4	4–4	T–5th	
Abilene Christian Wildcats (NCAA Division I FCS independent) (2013)
2013	Abilene Christian	6–5			
Abilene Christian Wildcats (Southland Conference) (2014–2016)
2014	Abilene Christian	6–6	4–4	T–6th	
2015	Abilene Christian	3–8	3–6	T–8th	
2016	Abilene Christian	2–9	2–7	10th	
Abilene Christian:		24–32	13–21		
Total:		24–32			
