= Brett Dolan =

American sportscaster

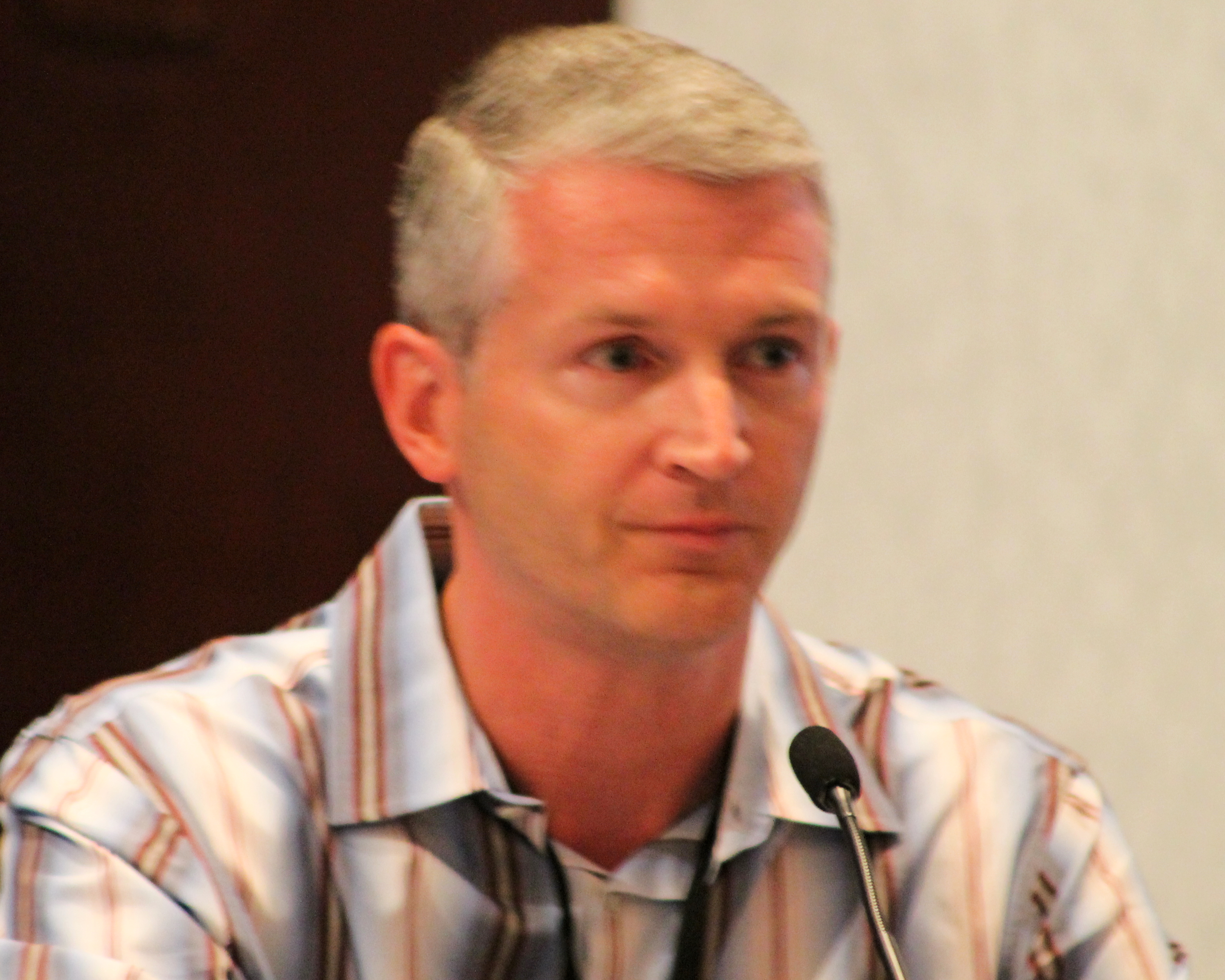
Dolan in 2014

Brett Dolan is an American radio sportscaster who is the voice of Touchdown Radio's game of the week. He previously served as the play-by-play announcer for the Houston Astros. Before joining the Astros, he served as the play-by-play announcer for the Triple A Tucson Sidewinders of the Pacific Coast League from 2000-2005, Iowa Cubs from 1998-99, and the Beloit Snappers of the Midwest League from 1994-1997.

He was chosen to fill in as a broadcaster for the Montreal Expos in 2003 and 2004 and during the 2004 and 2005 seasons he was the voice of the Arizona Fall League on MLB Radio. In 2004, he represented the Pacific Coast League in calling the Triple-A All-Star Game. He was Arizona Sportscaster of the Year in 2002 and 2003. In November 2005 he worked the Olympic baseball qualifying tournament in Phoenix.

A native of Casey, Iowa, he graduated from the University of Iowa in 1992.

Dolan previously worked as a sportscaster/news director at WTOQ/WKPL in Platteville, Wisconsin, in late 1992-early 1993, doing play-by-play of local high school sports.
