= 2013 Towson Tigers football team =

American college football season

2013 Towson Tigers football

Lambert Cup winner

NCAA Division I Football Championship Game, L 7–35 vs. North Dakota State
- Conference: Colonial Athletic Association

Ranking
- Sports Network: No. 2
- FCS Coaches: No. 2
- Record: 13–3 (6–2 CAA)
- Head coach: Rob Ambrose (5th season)
- Offensive coordinator: Jared Ambrose (2nd season)
- Defensive coordinator: Matt Hachmann (4th season)
- Home stadium: Johnny Unitas Stadium

2013 Colonial Athletic Association football standings
| | Conf. | | | Overall |
| Team | W | | L | W | | L |
|---|---|---|---|---|---|---|
| No. 12 Maine $^ | 7 | – | 1 | 10 | – | 3 |
| No. 2 Towson ^ | 6 | – | 2 | 13 | – | 3 |
| No. 5 New Hampshire ^ | 6 | – | 2 | 10 | – | 5 |
| Villanova | 5 | – | 3 | 6 | – | 5 |
| Delaware | 4 | – | 4 | 7 | – | 5 |
| William & Mary | 4 | – | 4 | 7 | – | 5 |
| Richmond | 4 | – | 4 | 6 | – | 6 |
| James Madison | 3 | – | 5 | 6 | – | 6 |
| Stony Brook | 3 | – | 5 | 5 | – | 6 |
| Rhode Island | 2 | – | 6 | 3 | – | 9 |
| Albany | 0 | – | 8 | 1 | – | 11 |
$ – Conference champion; ^ – FCS playoff participant; Rankings from The Sports Network poll

The 2013 Towson Tigers football team represented Towson University in the 2013 NCAA Division I FCS football season. They were led by fifth-year head coach Rob Ambrose and played their home games at Johnny Unitas Stadium. They were a member of the Colonial Athletic Association. They finished the season 13–3, 6–2 in CAA play to finish in a tie for second place. The season included the program's first win over a Football Bowl Subdivision opponent, UConn. The Tigers received an at-large bid to the FCS Playoffs, where they defeated Fordham, Eastern Illinois, and Eastern Washington to advance to the FCS National Championship game, where they lost to North Dakota State.

NFL draftee Terrance West ran for an NCAA season record 2509 yards.

== Schedule ==
Towson played a 12-game regular season schedule for only the fourth time in school history during the 2013 season.

| Date | Time | Opponent | Rank | Site | TV | Result | Attendance | Source |
|---|---|---|---|---|---|---|---|---|
| August 29 | 7:30 pm | at UConn* | No. 11 | Rentschler Field; East Hartford, CT | ESPN3 | W 33–18 | 30,689 | |
| September 7 | 1:00 pm | at Holy Cross* | No. 5 | Fitton Field; Worcester, MA | | W 49–7 | 6,281 | |
| September 14 | 7:30 pm | Delaware State* | No. 4 | Johnny Unitas Stadium; Towson, MD | TUSN | W 49–7 | 10,302 | |
| September 21 | 2:00 pm | at North Carolina Central* | No. 4 | O'Kelly-Riddick Stadium; Durham, NC | | W 35–17 | 4,037 | |
| September 28 | 6:00 pm | at Stony Brook | No. 3 | Kenneth P. LaValle Stadium; Stony Brook, NY | | W 35–21 | 7,859 | |
| October 5 | 12:00 pm | No. 19 New Hampshire | No. 3 | Johnny Unitas Stadium; Towson, MD | CSN | W 44–28 | 9,511 | |
| October 12 | 7:00 pm | No. 15 Villanova^{†} | No. 3 | Johnny Unitas Stadium; Towson, MD | NBCSN | L 35–45 | 10,234 | |
| October 19 | 3:30 pm | at Albany | No. 7 | Bob Ford Field; Albany, NY | | W 44–17 | 8,500 | |
| October 26 | 12:00 pm | at Richmond | No. 8 | E. Claiborne Robins Stadium; Richmond, VA | CSN | W 48–32 | 8,700 | |
| November 2 | 7:00 pm | No. 21 Delaware | No. 7 | Johnny Unitas Stadium; Towson, MD | TUSN | L 31–32 | 8,741 | |
| November 16 | 1:30 pm | at No. 16 William & Mary | No. 10 | Zable Stadium; Williamsburg, VA | | W 15–9 | 9,674 | |
| November 23 | 3:30 pm | James Madison | No. 7 | Johnny Unitas Stadium; Towson, MD | NBCSN | W 28–17 | 7,379 | |
| December 7 | 1:00 pm | No. 9 Fordham* | No. 5 | Johnny Unitas Stadium; Towson, MD (NCAA Division I Second Round) | ESPN3 | W 48–28 | 4,671 | |
| December 13 | 8:00 pm | at No. 2 Eastern Illinois* | No. 5 | O'Brien Stadium; Charleston, IL (NCAA Division I Quarterfinal) | ESPN2 | W 49–39 | 3,850 | |
| December 21 | 2:00 pm | at No. 3 Eastern Washington* | No. 5 | Roos Field; Cheney, WA (NCAA Division I Semifinal) | ESPNU | W 35–31 | 6,209 | |
| January 4, 2014 | 2:00 pm | vs. No. 1 North Dakota State* | No. 5 | Toyota Stadium; Frisco, TX (NCAA Division I Championship Game) | ESPN2 | L 7–35 | 19,802 | |
*Non-conference game; ^{†}Homecoming; Rankings from The Sports Network Poll released prior to the game; All times are in Eastern time

== Rankings ==
Ranking movements Legend: ██ Increase in ranking ██ Decrease in ranking
| | Week | | | | | | | | | | | | | | |
| Poll | Pre | 1 | 2 | 3 | 4 | 5 | 6 | 7 | 8 | 9 | 10 | 11 | 12 | 13 | Final |
|---|---|---|---|---|---|---|---|---|---|---|---|---|---|---|---|
| Sports Network | 11 | 5 | 4 | 4 | 3 | 3 | 3 | 7 | 8 | 7 | 13 | 10 | 7 | 5 | 2 |
| Coaches | 12 | 6 | 4 | 3 | 2 | 2 | 2 | 7 | 6 | 6 | 11 | 7 | 5 | 4 | 2 |
