= 2013 William & Mary Tribe football team =

American college football season

2013 William & Mary Tribe football
- Conference: Colonial Athletic Association
- Record: 7–5 (4–4 CAA)
- Head coach: Jimmye Laycock (34th season)
- Offensive coordinator: Kevin Rogers (1st season)
- Defensive coordinator: Scott Boone (3rd season)
- Captains: George Beerhalter; Jerome Couplin; Matt Crisafi
- Home stadium: Zable Stadium

2013 Colonial Athletic Association football standings
	Conf.			Overall
Team	W		L	W		L
No. 12 Maine $^	7	–	1	10	–	3
No. 2 Towson ^	6	–	2	13	–	3
No. 5 New Hampshire ^	6	–	2	10	–	5
Villanova	5	–	3	6	–	5
Delaware	4	–	4	7	–	5
William & Mary	4	–	4	7	–	5
Richmond	4	–	4	6	–	6
James Madison	3	–	5	6	–	6
Stony Brook	3	–	5	5	–	6
Rhode Island	2	–	6	3	–	9
Albany	0	–	8	1	–	11
$ – Conference champion; ^ – FCS playoff participant; Rankings from The Sports Network poll

The 2013 William & Mary Tribe football team represented The College of William & Mary in the 2013 NCAA Division I FCS football season. The Tribe were led by 34th year head coach Jimmye Laycock, and the team played their home games at Zable Stadium. They were a member of the Colonial Athletic Association. They finished the season 7–5, 4–4 in CAA play to finish in a three way tie for fifth place.

== Schedule ==
Date	Time	Opponent	Rank	Site	TV	Result	Attendance
August 31	12:00 pm	at West Virginia*		Mountaineer Field; Morgantown, WV	FS1	L 17–24	56,350
September 7	7:00 pm	Hampton*		Zable Stadium; Williamsburg, VA	TATV	W 31–7	9,802
September 14	6:00 pm	at Lafayette*		Fisher Stadium; Easton, PA		W 34–6	6,348
September 21	7:00 pm	Rhode Island		Zable Stadium; Williamsburg, VA	CSN	W 20–0	10,159
October 5	1:00 pm	at No. 20 Villanova		Villanova Stadium; Villanova, PA		L 16–20	6,219
October 12	3:30 pm	Penn*		Zable Stadium; Williamsburg, VA	TATV	W 27–14	7,921
October 19	12:30 pm	at No. 14 Maine		Alfond Stadium; Orono, ME		L 20–34	6,917
October 26	3:30 pm	No. 19 James Madison^{†}		Zable Stadium; Williamsburg, VA (rivalry)	TATV	W 17–7	12,259
November 2	1:30 pm	No. 16 New Hampshire		Zable Stadium; Williamsburg, VA	TATV	W 17–0	8,531
November 9	3:00 pm	at No. 15 Delaware	No. 23	Delaware Stadium; Newark, DE (rivalry)	CSN	W 24–10	21,010
November 16	1:30 pm	No. 10 Towson	No. 16	Zable Stadium; Williamsburg, VA	TATV	L 9–15	9,674
November 23	4:00 pm	Richmond	No. 19	E. Claiborne Robins Stadium; Richmond, VA (Capital Cup)		L 20–31	8,700
*Non-conference game; ^{†}Homecoming; Rankings from The Sports Network Poll released prior to the game; All times are in Eastern time

== Rankings ==
Ranking movements Legend: ██ Increase in ranking ██ Decrease in ranking — = Not ranked RV = Received votes т = Tied with team above or below
	Week														
Poll	Pre	1	2	3	4	5	6	7	8	9	10	11	12	13	Final
Sports Network	RV	RV	RV	RV	RV	RV	RV	RV	RV	RV	23	16	19	RV	RV
Coaches	—	RV	RV	RV	RV	RV	RV	RV	—	RV	24-T	20	20	RV	RV
