= 2013 Rhode Island Rams football team =

American college football season

2013 Rhode Island Rams football
- Conference: Colonial Athletic Association
- Record: 3–9 (2–6 CAA)
- Head coach: Joe Trainer (5th season)
- Offensive coordinator: Roy Istvan (3rd season)
- Defensive coordinator: Brian Vaganek (2nd season)
- Home stadium: Meade Stadium

2013 Colonial Athletic Association football standings
	Conf.			Overall
Team	W		L	W		L
No. 12 Maine $^	7	–	1	10	–	3
No. 2 Towson ^	6	–	2	13	–	3
No. 5 New Hampshire ^	6	–	2	10	–	5
Villanova	5	–	3	6	–	5
Delaware	4	–	4	7	–	5
William & Mary	4	–	4	7	–	5
Richmond	4	–	4	6	–	6
James Madison	3	–	5	6	–	6
Stony Brook	3	–	5	5	–	6
Rhode Island	2	–	6	3	–	9
Albany	0	–	8	1	–	11
$ – Conference champion; ^ – FCS playoff participant; Rankings from The Sports Network poll

The 2013 Rhode Island Rams football team represented the University of Rhode Island in the 2013 NCAA Division I FCS football season. They were led by fifth year head coach Joe Trainer and played their home games at Meade Stadium. They were a member of the Colonial Athletic Association. They finished the season 3–9, 2–6 in CAA play.

The Rams entered the season having lost a school-record 13 straight contests dating back to the final two games of the 2011 season. That record was extended to 15 after losing their opening two games of 2013 before finally ending the losing streak with a win over Albany on September 14.

== Schedule ==
Date	Time	Opponent	Site	TV	Result	Attendance
August 29	7:00 pm	at Fordham*	Jack Coffey Field; Bronx, NY		L 26–51	4,526
September 7	1:00 pm	No. 17 Stony Brook	Meade Stadium; Kingston, RI		L 0–24	4,302
September 14	7:00 pm	at Albany	Bob Ford Field; Albany, NY	CSN	W 19–13 ^{OT}	8,500
September 21	7:00 pm	at William & Mary	Zable Stadium; Williamsburg, VA	CSN	L 0–20	10,159
September 28	1:00 pm	Central Connecticut*	Meade Stadium; Kingston, RI		W 42–7	5,223
October 5	1:00 pm	at Brown*	Brown Stadium; Providence, RI (Battle for the Governor's Cup)		L 14–31	6,512
October 12	12:00 pm	at No. 25 New Hampshire	Cowell Stadium; Durham, NH		L 19–59	18,412
October 19	1:00 pm	Richmond	Meade Stadium; Kingston, RI		W 12–10	7,936
October 26	12:00 pm	Delaware^{†}	Meade Stadium; Kingston, RI		L 13–35	6,536
November 2	3:30 pm	at Old Dominion*	Foreman Field; Norfolk, VA		L 14–66	20,118
November 9	12:30 pm	Villanova	Meade Stadium; Kingston, RI		L 0–45	4,138
November 16	12:30 pm	at No. 6 Maine	Alfond Stadium; Orono, ME	FCS Pacific	L 0–41	5,067
*Non-conference game; ^{†}Homecoming; Rankings from The Sports Network Poll released prior to the game; All times are in Eastern time
