= 2013 Maine Black Bears football team =

American college football season

2013 Maine Black Bears football

CAA champion

FCS Playoffs Second Round, L 27–41 vs. New Hampshire
- Conference: Colonial Athletic Association

Ranking
- Sports Network: No. 12
- FCS Coaches: No. 11
- Record: 10–3 (7–2 CAA)
- Head coach: Jack Cosgrove (21st season)
- Offensive coordinator: Kevin Bourgoin
- Defensive coordinator: Paul Ferraro
- Home stadium: Alfond Stadium

2013 Colonial Athletic Association football standings
	Conf.			Overall
Team	W		L	W		L
No. 12 Maine $^	7	–	1	10	–	3
No. 2 Towson ^	6	–	2	13	–	3
No. 5 New Hampshire ^	6	–	2	10	–	5
Villanova	5	–	3	6	–	5
Delaware	4	–	4	7	–	5
William & Mary	4	–	4	7	–	5
Richmond	4	–	4	6	–	6
James Madison	3	–	5	6	–	6
Stony Brook	3	–	5	5	–	6
Rhode Island	2	–	6	3	–	9
Albany	0	–	8	1	–	11
$ – Conference champion; ^ – FCS playoff participant; Rankings from The Sports Network poll

The 2013 Maine Black Bears football team represented the University of Maine in the 2013 NCAA Division I FCS football season. They were led by 21st-year head coach Jack Cosgrove and played their home games at Alfond Stadium. They were a member of the Colonial Athletic Association (CAA). They finished the season 10–3, 7–1 in CAA play to be crowned CAA Champions. They received an automatic bid to the FCS Playoffs where they lost in the second round to fellow CAA member New Hampshire.

== Schedule ==
Date	Time	Opponent	Rank	Site	TV	Result	Attendance
August 31	6:00 pm	at Norfolk State*		William "Dick" Price Stadium; Norfolk, VA		W 23–6	8,881
September 7	2:00 pm	at Massachusetts*		Gillette Stadium; Foxborough, MA	ESPN3	W 24–14	15,624
September 14	3:30 pm	Bryant*		Alfond Stadium; Orono, ME	BBSN	W 35–22	5,863
September 21	3:30 pm	at No. 18 (FBS) Northwestern*		Ryan Field; Evanston, IL	BTN	L 21–35	32,726
September 28	4:00 pm	at No. 22 Richmond		E. Claiborne Robins Stadium; Richmond, VA	CSN	W 28–21	8,700
October 5	3:30 pm	No. 24 Delaware	No. 23	Alfond Stadium; Orono, ME	BBSN	W 62–28	6,304
October 19	12:30 pm	William & Mary	No. 14	Alfond Stadium; Orono, ME	WVII, FCS Atlantic	W 34–20	6,917
October 26	1:00 pm	at No. 18 Villanova	No. 11	Villanova Stadium; Villanova, PA		W 37–35	9,017
November 2	12:30 pm	Stony Brook	No. 10	Alfond Stadium; Orono, ME	WVII, FCS Pacific	W 19–14	4,068
November 9	3:30 pm	at Albany	No. 8	Bob Ford Field; Albany, NY		W 33–27	4,912
November 16	12:30 pm	Rhode Island	No. 6	Alfond Stadium; Orono, ME	WVII, FCS Pacific	W 41–0	5,067
November 23	12:30 pm	at No. 21 New Hampshire	No. 4	Cowell Stadium; Durham, NH (Battle for the Brice–Cowell Musket)	CSN	L 3–24	10,333
December 7	2:00 pm	No. 15 New Hampshire*	No. 10	Alfond Stadium; Orono, ME (NCAA Division I Second Round)	ESPN3	L 27–41	7,992
*Non-conference game; Rankings from The Sports Network Poll released prior to the game; All times are in Eastern time

== Ranking movements ==
Ranking movements Legend: ██ Increase in ranking ██ Decrease in ranking RV = Received votes
	Week														
Poll	Pre	1	2	3	4	5	6	7	8	9	10	11	12	13	Final
Sports Network	RV	RV	RV	RV	RV	23	14	14	11	10	8	6	4	10	12
Coaches	RV	RV	RV	25	RV	23	17	17	14	11	9	6	4	8	11

== After the season ==
The following Black Bear was selected in the 2014 NFL draft after the season.

Round	Pick	Player	Position	NFL club
6	148	Kendall James	Defensive back	Minnesota Vikings
