= 2013 Delaware Fightin' Blue Hens football team =

American college football season

2013 Delaware Fightin' Blue Hens football
- Conference: Colonial Athletic Association
- Record: 7–5 (4–4 CAA)
- Head coach: Dave Brock (1st season)
- Offensive coordinator: Sean Devine (1st season)
- Offensive scheme: Multiple
- Defensive coordinator: Tim Weaver (1st season)
- Base defense: 4–3
- Home stadium: Delaware Stadium

2013 Colonial Athletic Association football standings
	Conf.			Overall
Team	W		L	W		L
No. 12 Maine $^	7	–	1	10	–	3
No. 2 Towson ^	6	–	2	13	–	3
No. 5 New Hampshire ^	6	–	2	10	–	5
Villanova	5	–	3	6	–	5
Delaware	4	–	4	7	–	5
William & Mary	4	–	4	7	–	5
Richmond	4	–	4	6	–	6
James Madison	3	–	5	6	–	6
Stony Brook	3	–	5	5	–	6
Rhode Island	2	–	6	3	–	9
Albany	0	–	8	1	–	11
$ – Conference champion; ^ – FCS playoff participant; Rankings from The Sports Network poll

The 2013 Delaware Fightin' Blue Hens football team represented the University of Delaware as a member of the Colonial Athletic Association (CAA) during the 2013 NCAA Division I FCS football season. Led by first-year head coach Dave Brock, the Fightin' Blue Hens compiled an overall record of 7–5 with a mark of 4–4 in conference play, placing in a three-way tie for fifth in the CAA. The team played home games at Delaware Stadium in Newark, Delaware.

== Preseason ==
=== Recruiting class ===
The Blue Hens received 12 letters of intent on National Signing Day, February 6, 2013.

College recruiting information
Name	Hometown	School	Height	Weight	40^{‡}	Commit date
Diante Cherry; WR	Lancaster, PA	McCaskey HS	5 ft 9 in (1.75 m)	170 lb (77 kg)	–	Nov 5, 2012
Diante Cherry; WR	Recruit ratings: Scout: Rivals: (70)					
Wes Hills; RB/LB	Wildwood, NJ	Wildwood HS	6 ft 1 in (1.85 m)	195 lb (88 kg)	4.48	Jan 5, 2013
Wes Hills; RB/LB	Recruit ratings: (69)					
Luke Moore; QB	Wilmington, DE	St. Mark's High School	6 ft 2 in (1.88 m)	180 lb (82 kg)	4.75	
Luke Moore; QB	Recruit ratings: (99)					
Jalen Kindle; LB	Fleming Island, FL	Fleming Island HS	6 ft 1 in (1.85 m)	210 lb (95 kg)	–	
Jalen Kindle; LB	Recruit ratings: No ratings found					
Larry Spears; LB	Henrico, VA	Varina HS	5 ft 11 in (1.80 m)	215 lb (98 kg)	–	
Larry Spears; LB	Recruit ratings: No ratings found					
Roman Tatum; CB	Winter Garden, FL	West Orange HS	5 ft 11 in (1.80 m)	170 lb (77 kg)	–	
Roman Tatum; CB	Recruit ratings: No ratings found					
Ryan Torzsa; S	Waxhaw, NC	Cuthbertson HS	6 ft 2 in (1.88 m)	192 lb (87 kg)	–	
Ryan Torzsa; S	Recruit ratings: No ratings found					
Jacob Trump; OL	Mechanicsburg, PA	Mechanicsburg HS	6 ft 6 in (1.98 m)	270 lb (120 kg)	–	
Jacob Trump; OL	Recruit ratings: No ratings found					
Cedric Udegbe; DE	Minneola, FL	Montverde Academy	6 ft 3 in (1.91 m)	245 lb (111 kg)	–	
Cedric Udegbe; DE	Recruit ratings: No ratings found					
Justin Watson; S	Washington, D.C	Friendship Collegiate	5 ft 9 in (1.75 m)	165 lb (75 kg)	–	
Justin Watson; S	Recruit ratings: No ratings found					
Blaine Woodson; DL	East Stroudsburg, PA	Stroudsburg HS	6 ft 3 in (1.91 m)	260 lb (120 kg)	–	Nov 4, 2012
Blaine Woodson; DL	Recruit ratings: No ratings found					
Kyle Yocum; QB	Reading, PA	Exeter HS	6 ft 2 in (1.88 m)	220 lb (100 kg)	–	Jun 17, 2012
Kyle Yocum; QB	Recruit ratings: Rivals:					
Overall recruit ranking:
‡ Refers to 40-yard dash; Note: In many cases, Scout, Rivals, 247Sports, On3, and ESPN may conflict in their listings of height, weight and 40 time.; In these cases, the average was taken. ESPN grades are on a 100-point scale.; Sources: "Delaware Commit List for 2013". Rivals.; "RecruitTracker 2013: Delaware". ESPN.; "2013 Team Ranking". Rivals.com.

=== Transfers ===
On February 6, 2013, it was announced that Delaware added two transfers for the 2013 season: junior linebacker Kennedy Ogbonna from ASA The College For Excellence and junior running back Jordan Thomas from Rutgers University. Greyshirted linebacker Eric Patton was added to the roster for the 2013 season as well.

=== Preseason awards ===
- Sean Baner

CFPA Preseason Placekicker Watch List
The Sports Network Preseason All-American Second Team

- Michael Johnson

CFPA Kick Returners to Watch

- Bobby Kennedy

CAA Preseason All-Conference First Team

- Zach Kerr

The Sports Network Preseason All-American Second Team
Phil Steele Preseason All-American First Team
CAA Preseason All-Conference First Team
College Sports Journal FCS Preseason All-American First Team

- Andrew Pierce

The Sports Network Preseason All-American Third Team
Walter Payton National Player of the Year Watch List
College Sports Journal FCS Preseason All-American Second Team

- Jeff Williams

CFPA Preseason Linebacker Watch List
Phil Steele Preseason All-American Third Team
College Sports Journal FCS Preseason All-American Second Team

=== Conference predictions ===
Delaware was predicted to finish sixth in the CAA Preseason Poll.

CAA Preseason Poll:
1. Villanova (11 First Place Votes)
2. Towson (3)
3. New Hampshire (3)
4. Richmond (1)
5. James Madison (4)
6. Delaware
7. Stony Brook
8. Maine
9. William & Mary
10. Albany
11. Rhode Island

=== Preseason rankings ===
==== FCS Coaches Poll ====
Delaware received 47 points in the Preseason Coaches Poll, resulting in the 30th highest total. Four of Delaware's CAA opponents received a Top 25 ranking (#9 Villanova, #12 Towson, #14 Richmond, and #15 James Madison). Three additional opponents, two from the CAA, for the season received votes (Wagner, Maine, and Albany).

==== The Sports Network FCS Poll ====
Delaware received 130 points in the Preseason Sports Network FCS Poll, placing them in 32nd. Of the CAA opponents that the Hens will face in 2013, four received a Top 25 position: #5 Villanova, #11 Towson, #15 Richmond, and #19 James Madison. In addition, three opponents for 2013 received votes: Wagner, Albany, and William & Mary.

== Schedule ==
Date	Time	Opponent	Rank	Site	TV	Result	Attendance
August 29	7:30 pm	Jacksonville*		Delaware Stadium; Newark, DE	HAA	W 51–35	19,120
September 7	3:30 pm	Delaware State*		Delaware Stadium; Newark, DE (Route 1 Rivalry)	NBCSN	W 42–21	19,316
September 14	3:30 pm	at Navy*		Navy–Marine Corps Memorial Stadium; Annapolis, MD	CBSSN	L 7–51	36,208
September 21	6:00 pm	Wagner*		Delaware Stadium; Newark, DE	HAA	W 49–9	15,723
September 28	7:00 pm	No. 14 James Madison		Delaware Stadium; Newark, DE (rivalry)	CSN	W 29–22	18,405
October 5	3:30 pm	at No. 23 Maine	No. 24	Alfond Stadium; Orono, ME		L 28–62	6,304
October 12	12:00 pm	Albany^{†}		Delaware Stadium; Newark, DE	CSN	W 33–30	17,363
October 26	12:00 pm	at Rhode Island		Meade Stadium; Kingston, RI		W 35–13	6,536
November 2	7:00 pm	at No. 7 Towson	No. 21	Johnny Unitas Stadium; Towson, MD		W 32–31	8,741
November 9	3:00 pm	No. 23 William & Mary	No. 15	Delaware Stadium; Newark, DE (rivalry)	CSN	L 10–24	21,010
November 16	12:00 pm	Richmond	No. 21	Delaware Stadium; Newark, DE	HAA	L 43–46	15,817
November 23	3:30 pm	vs. Villanova		PPL Park; Chester, PA (Battle of the Blue)		L 34–35	10,117
*Non-conference game; ^{†}Homecoming; Rankings from The Sports Network Poll released prior to the game; All times are in Eastern time

== Opening depth chart ==
Defense

FS
⋅
⋅

WLB	MLB	SLB
⋅	⋅	⋅
⋅	⋅	⋅

SS
⋅
Blair Menefee

CB
Travis Hawkins
Mark Doe

DE	DT	DT	DE
⋅	⋅	⋅	Laith Wallschleger
⋅	⋅	Logan Shultz	Derrick Saulsberry

CB
Jordan Thomas
⋅

Offense

WR
⋅
⋅

WR
⋅
⋅

LT	LG	C	RG	RT
⋅	⋅	⋅	⋅	⋅
⋅	⋅	⋅	⋅	⋅

WR
⋅
⋅

WR
⋅
⋅

QB
⋅
⋅

RB
⋅
⋅

== Coaching staff ==
Name	Position	Year	Alma mater
Dave Brock	Head coach	2013	Salisbury (1994)
Sean Devine	Offensive coordinator/offensive line	2013	Colby (1994)
Tim Weaver	Defensive coordinator/linebackers	2013	Davidson (1990)
John Perry	Passing game coordinator/quarterbacks	2013	New Hampshire (1992)
Brian Ginn	Receivers	2000	Delaware (2000)
Devin Fitzsimmons	Tight Ends/special teams	2013	Bucknell (2005)
Dennis Dottin-Carter	Defensive line	2013	Maine (2002)
Tony Lucas	Running backs	2013	Columbia (2003)
Henry Baker	Cornerbacks	2011	Maryland (2003)
Tom McEntire	Safeties	2013	Thiel (2006)
Fritz Stueber	Offensive Quality Control	2011	Delaware (2012)
Michael Donovan	Defensive Quality Control	2013	Bentley University (2011)

== Game summaries ==
=== Jacksonville ===
Team	1	2	3	4	Total
Dolphins	14	7	0	14	35
• Blue Hens	0	21	10	20	51

- Location: Delaware Stadium
  Newark, Delaware
- Game start: 7:36 PM
- Elapsed time: 3:09
- Game attendance: 19,120
- Game weather: Temp: 80 • Wind: 5 ENE • Weather: Hot, Humid
- Referee: Tony Marcella

Scoring summary
1	4:09	Jacksonville	Andrew Robustelli 21 yard pass from Kade Bell (Dylan Lynch kick)	Jacksonville 7–0
1	3:54	Jacksonville	D'Andre Randle 13 yard pass from Kade Bell (Dylan Lynch kick)	Jacksonville 14–0
2	13:17	Delaware	Michael Johnson 6 yard run (Sean Baner kick)	Jacksonville 14–7
2	6:52	Delaware	Nick Boyle 1 yard pass from Trent Hurley (Sean Baner kick)	Tied 14–14
2	6:23	Jacksonville	Andrew Robustelli 57 yard pass from Kade Bell (Dylan Lynch kick)	Jacksonville 21–14
2	1:50	Delaware	Andrew Pierce 2 yard run (Sean Baner kick)	Tied 21–21
3	11:55	Delaware	Sean Baner 20 yard field goal	Delaware 24–21
3	3:04	Delaware	Jalen Randolph 1 yard run (Sean Baner kick)	Delaware 31–21
4	14:56	Delaware	Julian Laing 1 yard run (Sean Baner kick)	Delaware 38–21
4	12:00	Jacksonville	Antonio Mcrae 63 yard interception return (Dylan Lynch kick)	Delaware 38–28
4	6:04	Delaware	Julian Laing 10 yard run (kick failed)	Delaware 44–28
4	3:45	Jacksonville	Andy Jones 36 yard pass from Kade Bell (Dylan Lynch kick)	Delaware 44–35
4	3:31	Delaware	Jeff Williams 24 yard fumble recovery (Sean Baner kick)	Delaware 51–35

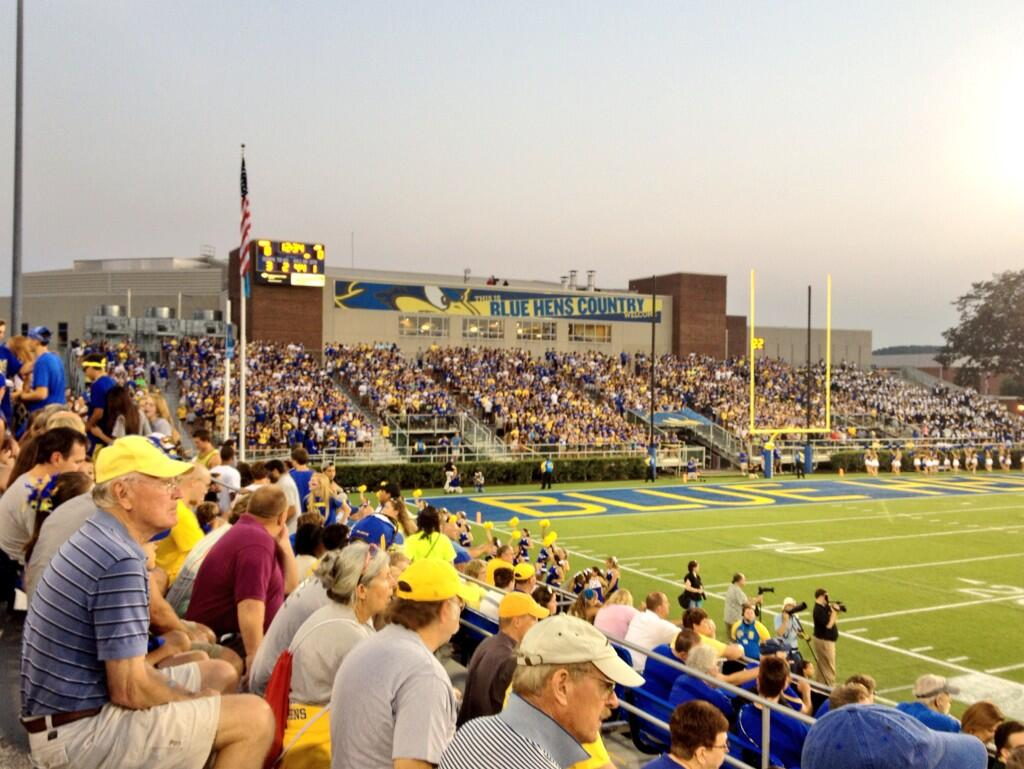
The student section of Delaware Stadium during the 2013 season opener against Jacksonville.

=== Delaware State ===
Route 1 Rivalry

Team	1	2	3	4	Total
Hornets	0	7	7	7	21
• Blue Hens	14	21	0	7	42

- Location: Delaware Stadium
  Newark, Delaware
- Game start: 3:36 PM
- Elapsed time: 3:05
- Game attendance: 19,316
- Game weather: Temp: 76 • Wind: 8 WSW • Weather: Sunny
- Referee: Kelvin Hudson
- Television network: NBC Sports Network

Scoring summary
1	9:18	Delaware	Michael Johnson 55 Yd Pass From Trent Hurley (Sean Baner Kick)	Delaware 7–0
1	2:00	Delaware	Rob Jones 5 Yd Pass From Trent Hurley (Sean Baner Kick)	Delaware 14–0
2	11:32	Delaware State	Malik Golson 4 Yd Pass From Cory Murphy (Mitchell Ward Kick)	Delaware 14–7
2	10:13	Delaware	Rob Jones 33 Yd Pass From Trent Hurley (Sean Baner Kick)	Delaware 21–7
2	9:03	Delaware	Rob Jones 62 Yd Punt Return (Sean Baner Kick)	Delaware 28–7
2	4:32	Delaware	Julian Laing 9 Yd Run (Sean Baner Kick)	Delaware 35–7
3	2:47	Delaware State	Malik Golson 7 Yd Pass From Cory Murphy (Mitchell Ward Kick)	Delaware 35–14
4	9:49	Delaware	Nick Boyle 25 Yd Pass From Trent Hurley (Sean Baner Kick)	Delaware 42–14
4	2:11	Delaware State	Esayah Obado 18 Yd Fumble Return (Mitchell Ward Kick)	Delaware 42–21

=== Navy ===
Team	1	2	3	4	Total
Blue Hens	0	7	0	0	7
• Midshipmen	10	13	14	14	51

- Location: Navy-Marine Corps Memorial Stadium
  Annapolis, Maryland
- Game start: 3:34 PM
- Elapsed time: 3:16
- Game attendance: 36,208
- Game weather: Temp:67 • Wind:N 10 • Weather:Sunny
- Referee: Jonah Monroe
- Television network: CBS Sports Network

Scoring summary
1	9:02	Navy	Darius Staten 10 yard run (Nick Sloan Kick)	Navy 7–0
1	0:40	Navy	Nick Sloan 24 yard FG	Navy 10–0
2	13:12	Navy	Geoffrey Whiteside 7 yard run (Nick Sloan Kick)	Navy 17–0
2	8:26	Navy	Keenan Reynolds 63 yard pass to DeBrandon Sanders (Kick Failed)	Navy 23–0
2	4:27	Delaware	Trent Hurley 17 yard pass to Ryan Cobb (Sean Baner Kick)	Navy 23–7
3	10:43	Navy	Keenan Reynolds 29 yard pass to Shawn Lynch (Nick Sloan Kick)	Navy 30–7
3	2:40	Navy	Geoffrey Whiteside 13 yard run (Nick Sloan Kick)	Navy 37–7
4	13:41	Navy	Chris Swain 2 yard run (Nick Sloan Kick)	Navy 44–7
4	9:00	Navy	John Hendrick 1 yard run (Nick Sloan Kick)	Navy 51–7

- Navy was coming off a loss to Arizona State in the Kraft Fight Hunger Bowl in 2012.
- Most lopsided Navy win in series all-time.
- Navy would go on to play in the Armed Forces Bowl, defeating Middle Tennessee.

=== Wagner ===
Team	1	2	3	4	Total
Seahawks	3	0	0	6	9
• Blue Hens	21	21	7	0	49

- Location: Delaware Stadium
  Newark, Delaware
- Game start: 6:06 PM
- Elapsed time: 2:45
- Game attendance: 15,723
- Game weather: Temp: 76 • Wind: Calm • Weather: Rain
- Referee: James R. Smith

Scoring summary
1	13:42	Delaware	Trent Hurley 19 yard pass to Nick Boyle (Sean Baner kick)	Delaware 7–0
1	9:54	Wagner	David Lopez 41 yard field goal	Delaware 7–3
1	9:30	Delaware	Trent Hurley 77 yard pass to Michael Johnson (Sean Baner kick)	Delaware 14–3
1	0:52	Delaware	Trent Hurley 21 yard pass to Michael Johnson (Sean Baner kick)	Delaware 21–3
2	12:26	Delaware	Jalen Randolph 14 yard run (Sean Baner kick)	Delaware 28–3
2	5:34	Delaware	Trent Hurley 31 yard pass to Michael Johnson (Sean Baner kick)	Delaware 35–3
2	3:48	Delaware	Andrew Pierce 7 yard run (Sean Baner kick)	Delaware 42–3
3	7:10	Delaware	Trevor Sasek 39 yard pass to Rob Jones (Sean Baner kick)	Delaware 49–3
4	2:55	Wagner	Brian Gehring 1 yard run (kick blocked)	Delaware 49–9

- Wagner was coming off a share of the NEC championship and a Second Round loss to Eastern Washington in 2012.

=== James Madison ===
Team	1	2	3	4	Total
#14 Dukes	13	6	0	3	22
• Blue Hens	0	7	15	7	29

- Location: Delaware Stadium
  Newark, Delaware
- Game start: 7:07 PM
- Elapsed time: 2:57
- Game attendance: 18,405
- Game weather: Temp: 66 • Wind: 6 ENE • Weather: Clear
- Referee: Henry Wimberg
- TV announcers (NBC Regional Networks): Scott Graham & Brad Jackson

Scoring summary
1	13:48	James Madison	Cameron Starke 42 yard Field Goal	James Madison 3–0
1	6:11	James Madison	Cameron Starke 31 yard Field Goal	James Madison 6–0
1	0:16	James Madison	Michael Birdsong 37 yard pass to Deane Cheatham (Cameron Starke kick)	James Madison 13–0
2	7:04	Delaware	Andrew Pierce 2 yard run (Sean Baner kick)	James Madison 13–7
2	0:06	James Madison	Michale Birdsong 33 yard pass to Dae'Quan Scott (kick failed)	James Madison 19–7
3	3:34	Delaware	Trent Hurley 1 yard pass to Malcolm Bush (Sean Baner kick)	James Madison 19–14
3	0:44	Delaware	Trent Hurley 8 yard pass to Nick Boyle (Trent Hurley pass to Nick Boyle)	Delaware 22–19
4	11:35	James Madison	Cameron Starke 28 yard Field Goal	Tied 22–22
4	6:40	Delaware	Trent Hurley 4 yard pass to Nick Boyle (Sean Baner kick)	Delaware 29–22

=== Maine ===
Team	1	2	3	4	Total
#24 Blue Hens	8	7	0	13	28
• #23 Black Bears	27	7	21	7	62

- Location: Alfond Stadium
  Orono, Maine
- Game start: 3:37 PM
- Elapsed time: 2:52
- Game attendance: 6,304
- Game weather: Temp: 60 • Wind: Calm • Weather: Overcast
- Referee: William Gosseli

Scoring summary
1	11:23	Maine	Marcus Wasilewski 24 yard pass to Damarr Aultman (Sean Decloux kick)	Maine 7–0
1	7:44	Maine	Nigel Jones 7 yard run (Sean Decloux kick)	Maine 14–0
1	7:35	Maine	Sherrod Baltimore 20 yard fumble recovery (kick blocked, returned for defensive 2-point conversion by Jordan Thomas)	Maine 20–2
1	4:54	Maine	Michael Mangiarelli 43 yard interception return (Sean Decloux kick)	Maine 27–2
1	2:14	Delaware	Trent Hurley 22 yard pass to Michael Johnson (kick blocked)	Maine 27–8
2	4:56	Maine	Marcus Wasilewski 33 yard pass to Nigel Jones (Sean Decloux kick)	Maine 34–8
2	1:02	Delaware	Trent Hurley 4 yard run (Sean Baner kick)	Maine 34–15
3	13:59	Maine	Nigel Jones 12 yard run (Sean Decloux kick)	Maine 41–15
3	6:02	Maine	Marcus Wasilewski 10 yard pass to Isaiah Jones (Sean Decloux kick)	Maine 48–15
3	2:55	Maine	John Ebeling 29 yard run (Sean Decloux kick)	Maine 55–15
4	12:58	Maine	John Ebeling 7 yard run (Sean Decloux kick)	Maine 62–15
4	10:01	Delaware	Jalen Randolph 1 yard run (kick blocked)	Maine 62–21
4	3:17	Delaware	Wes Hills 3 yard run (Sean Baner kick)	Maine 62–28

- Most lopsided Maine win in series all-time.
- First time Delaware allowed 60+ points in regulation since a September 24, 1921, loss to Pennsylvania (89–0).
- Maine would go on to win the CAA championship, and fall in the Second Round to New Hampshire.

=== Albany ===
Team	1	2	3	4	Total
Great Danes	3	7	7	13	30
• Blue Hens	0	16	6	11	33

- Location: Delaware Stadium
  Newark, Delaware
- Game start: 12:07 PM
- Elapsed time: 3:21
- Game attendance: 17,363
- Game weather: Temp: 66 • Wind: 15 NE • Weather: Cloudy
- Referee: Bill Broadhurst
- TV announcers (NBC Regional Networks): Scott Graham & Brad Jackson

Scoring summary
1	7:43	Albany	Tom O'Riordan 33 yard Field Goal	Albany 3–0
2	13:50	Delaware	Andrew Pierce 6 yard run (Sean Baner kick)	Delaware 7–3
2	11:10	Albany	Omar Osbourne 1 yard run (Tom O'Riordan kick)	Albany 10–7
2	7:17	Delaware	Sean Baner 23 yard Field Goal	Tied 10–10
2	1:35	Delaware	Andrew Pierce 4 yard run (Kick blocked)	Delaware 16–10
3	5:00	Albany	Omar Osbourne 4 yard run (Tom O'Riordan kick)	Albany 17–16
3	3:48	Delaware	Rob Jones 71 yard run (Two-point conversion failed)	Delaware 22–17
4	10:09	Albany	Will Fiacchi 12 yard pass to Nic Ketter (Two-point conversion failed)	Albany 23–22
4	3:18	Albany	Omar Osbourne 21 yard run (Tom O'Riordan kick)	Albany 30–22
4	1:42	Delaware	Trent Hurley 20 yard pass to Rob Jones (Trent Hurley pass to Michael Johnson)	Tied 30–30
4	0:00	Delaware	Sean Baner 42 yard Field Goal	Delaware 33–30

- Albany was coming off a share of the NEC championship in 2012.

=== Rhode Island ===
Team	1	2	3	4	Total
• Blue Hens	7	14	14	0	35
Rams	0	6	7	0	13

- Location: Meade Stadium
  Kingston, Rhode Island
- Game start: 12:00 PM
- Elapsed time: 2:50
- Game attendance: 6,536
- Game weather: Temp: 55 • Wind: 13 WSW • Weather: Partly Cloudy
- Referee: Tom Kichline

Scoring summary
1	8:39	Delaware	Andrew Pierce 2 yard run (Sean Baner kick)	Delaware 7–0
2	14:53	Rhode Island	Bob Bentsen 20 yard pass to Robbie Jackson (Two-point conversion failed)	Delaware 7–6
2	11:03	Delaware	Trent Hurley 19 yard pass to Nick Boyle (Sean Baner kick)	Delaware 14–6
2	5:56	Delaware	Andrew Pierce 4 yard run (Sean Baner kick)	Delaware 21–6
3	14:48	Delaware	Andrew Pierce 75 yard run (Sean Baner kick)	Delaware 28–6
3	5:24	Rhode Island	Robbie Delgado 3 yard run (Dylan Smith kick)	Delaware 28–13
3	0:17	Delaware	Michael Johnson 78 yard run (Sean Baner kick)	Delaware 35–13

=== Towson ===
Team	1	2	3	4	Total
• #21 Blue Hens	10	0	0	22	32
#7 Tigers	7	14	7	3	31

- Location: Johnny Unitas Stadium
  Towson, Maryland
- Game start: 7:05 PM
- Elapsed time: 3:07
- Game attendance: 8,741
- Game weather: Temp: 58 • Wind: 10 WNW • Weather: Clear
- Referee: C. Lamertana

Scoring summary
1	9:52	Delaware	Sean Baner 20 yard Field Goal	Delaware 3–0
1	6:52	Towson	Darius Victor 22 yard run (Drew Evangelista kick)	Towson 7–3
1	3:36	Delaware	Trevor Sasek 16 yard pass to Jerel Harrison (Sean Baner kick)	Delaware 10–7
2	5:24	Towson	Terrence West 1 yard run (Drew Evangelista kick)	Towson 14–10
2	0:26	Towson	Terrence West 1 yard run (Drew Evangelista kick)	Towson 21–10
3	13:32	Towson	Peter Athens 5 yard pass to Emmanuel Holder (Drew Evangelista kick)	Towson 28–10
4	14:31	Towson	Drew Evangelista 25 yard Field Goal	Towson 31–10
4	11:26	Delaware	Jalen Randolph 1 yard run (Sean Baner kick)	Towson 31–17
4	0:48	Delaware	Trevor Sasek 11 yard pass to Michael Johnson (Sean Baner kick)	Towson 31–24
4	0:19	Delaware	Trevor Sasek 3 yard pass to Rob Jones (Trevor Sasek pass to Rob Jones)	Delaware 32–31

- Towson was coming off a shared CAA championship in 2012.
- Towson would go on to play in the National Championship Game, falling to North Dakota State.

=== William & Mary ===
Team	1	2	3	4	Total
• #23 Tribe	10	7	7	0	24
#15 Blue Hens	7	0	3	0	10

- Location: Delaware Stadium
  Newark, Delaware
- Game start: 3:07 PM
- Elapsed time: 2:58
- Game attendance: 21,010
- Game weather: Temp: 51 • Wind: 10 S • Weather: Sunny, Cool
- TV announcers (NBC Regional Networks): Scott Graham & Brad Jackson

Scoring summary
1	14:45	Delaware	Travis Hawkins 97 yard kickoff return (Sean Baner kick)	Delaware 7–0
1	11:44	William & Mary	Jerome Couplin 51 yard fumble recovery return (John Carpenter kick)	Tied 7–7
1	0:28	William & Mary	John Carpenter 47 yard field goal	William & Mary 10–7
2	0:09	William & Mary	Brent Caprio 3 yard pass to Tre McBride (John Carpenter kick)	William & Mary 17–7
3	11:35	William & Mary	Brent Caprio 30 yard pass to Sean Ballard (John Carpenter kick)	William & Mary 24–7
3	0:06	Delaware	Sean Baner 36 yard field goal	William & Mary 24–10

=== Richmond ===
Team	1	2	3	4	Total
• Spiders	7	22	7	10	46
#21 Blue Hens	3	14	14	12	43

- Location: Delaware Stadium
  Newark, Delaware
- Game start: 12:07 PM
- Elapsed time: 3:15
- Game attendance: 15,817
- Game weather: Temp: 52 • Wind: Calm • Weather: Overcast
- Referee: Paul Zukis

Scoring summary
1	9:40	Richmond	Michael Strauss 4 yard pass to Ben Edwards (Brandon Jordi kick)	Richmond 7–0
1	8:05	Delaware	Sean Baner 42 yard Field Goal	Richmond 7–3
2	13:01	Richmond	Michael Strauss 21 yard pass to Stephen Barnette (Brandon Jordi kick)	Richmond 14–3
2	10:14	Richmond	David Broadus 3 yard run (Michael Strauss pass to David Broadus)	Richmond 22–3
2	3:44	Delaware	Trent Hurley 1 yard pass to Nick Boyle (Sean Baner kick)	Richmond 22–10
2	0:50	Delaware	Jalen Randolph 1 yard run (Sean Baner kick)	Richmond 22–17
2	0:09	Richmond	Michael Strauss 50 yard pass to Brian Brown (Brandon Jordi kick)	Richmond 29–17
3	7:18	Richmond	Michael Strauss 23 yard pass to Hunter Westfall (Brandon Jordi kick)	Richmond 36–17
3	5:47	Delaware	Trent Hurley 12 yard pass to Julian Laing (Sean Baner kick)	Richmond 36–24
3	1:47	Delaware	Trent Hurley 80 yard pass to Michael Johnson (Sean Baner kick)	Richmond 36–31
4	13:03	Richmond	Brandon Jordi 34 yard Field Goal	Richmond 39–31
4	9:13	Delaware	Trent Hurley 2 yard pass to Andrew Pierce (Two-point conversion failed)	Richmond 39–37
4	0:45	Delaware	Andrew Pierce 11 yard run (Two-point conversion failed)	Delaware 43–39
4	0:04	Richmond	Michael Strauss 3 yard pass to Reggie Diggs (Brandon Jordi kick)	Richmond 46–43

- Richmond was coming off a shared CAA championship in 2012.

=== Villanova ===
Battle of the Blue

Team	1	2	3	4	Total
Blue Hens	14	0	20	0	34
• Wildcats	3	6	3	23	35

- Location: PPL Park
  Chester, Pennsylvania
- Game start: 3:36 PM
- Elapsed time: 3:10
- Game attendance: 10,117
- Game weather: Temp: 48 • Wind: NW 12 • Weather: Partly Cloudy
- Referee: H. Wimberg

Scoring summary
1	12:11	Delaware	Trent Hurley 12 yard pass to Michael Johnson (Sean Baner kick)	Delaware 7–0
1	7:02	Delaware	Rob Jones 13 yard pass to Trent Hurley (Sean Baner kick)	Delaware 14–0
1	3:25	Villanova	Mark Hamilton 32 yard Field Goal	Delaware 14–3
2	12:13	Villanova	John Robertson 6 yard run (kick blocked)	Delaware 14–9
3	10:54	Delaware	Jerel Harrison 8 yard run (Sean Baner kick)	Delaware 21–9
3	7:36	Villanova	Mark Hamilton 28 yard Field Goal	Delaware 21–12
3	5:16	Delaware	Trent Hurley 22 yard pass to Michael Johnson (Sean Baner kick)	Delaware 28–12
3	1:24	Delaware	Andrew Pierce 10 yard run (kick blocked)	Delaware 34–12
4	8:01	Villanova	John Robertson 11 yard pass to Joe Price (Mark Hamilton kick)	Delaware 34–19
4	3:17	Villanova	John Robertson 21 yard pass to Joe Price (Mark Hamilton kick)	Delaware 34–26
4	1:45	Villanova	John Robertson 25 yard pass to Gary Underwood (Two-point try failed)	Delaware 34–32
4	0:01	Villanova	Mark Hamilton 24 yard Field Goal	Villanova 35–34

- Villanova was coming off a shared CAA championship, and a First Round loss to Stony Brook in 2012.

== Postseason ==
Following the losing streak to close the season, the Blue Hens failed to qualify for the playoffs.

=== Conference standings ===
Team (change from preseason prediction)
1. Maine (−7)
2. Towson (even)
3. New Hampshire (even)
4. Villanova (+3)
5. Richmond (+1)
6. William & Mary (−3)
7. Delaware (+1)
8. Stony Brook (even)
9. James Madison (+4)
10. Rhode Island (−1)
11. Albany (+1)

=== Postseason awards ===
- Nick Boyle

Second Team CAA All-Conference (Tight End)
First Team College Sports Madness All-Conference (Tight End)

- Pat Callaway

Second Team CAA All-Conference (Linebacker)
Third Team College Sports Madness All-Conference (Linebacker)

- Eric Enderson

Second Team CAA All-Conference (Punter)
First Team College Sports Madness All-Conference (Punter)

- Brandon Heath

Third Team CAA All-Conference (offensive line)
Second Team College Sports Madness All-Conference (offensive line)

- Michael Johnson

Second Team CAA All-Conference (wide receiver)
First Team College Sports Madness All-Conference (wide receiver)

- Rob Jones

First Team CAA All-Conference (Punt Returner)
First Team College Sports Madness All-Conference (Punt Returner)

- Bobby Kennedy

Second Team CAA All-Conference (offensive line)
Third Team College Sports Madness All-Conference (offensive line)

- Zach Kerr

First Team CAA All-Conference (defensive line)
Second Team College Sports Madness All-Conference (defensive line)
Third Team Beyond Sports Network All-American (defensive line)
Second Team The Sports Network All-American (defensive line)
2014 East-West Shrine Game invitee

- Andrew Pierce

Second Team CAA All-Conference (running back)
Third Team College Sports Madness All-Conference (running back)

== Ranking movements ==
Ranking movements Legend: ██ Increase in ranking ██ Decrease in ranking — = Not ranked RV = Received votes
	Week														
Poll	Pre	1	2	3	4	5	6	7	8	9	10	11	12	13	Final
Sports Network	RV	RV	RV	RV	RV	24	RV	RV	RV	21	15	21	RV	RV	—
Coaches	RV	RV	RV	RV	RV	25	RV	RV	RV	RV	21	22	RV	—	—
