= 2013 New Hampshire Wildcats football team =

American college football season

2013 New Hampshire Wildcats football

FCS Semifinals, L 14–52 vs. North Dakota State
- Conference: Colonial Athletic Association

Ranking
- Sports Network: No. 5
- FCS Coaches: No. 5
- Record: 10–5 (6–2 CAA)
- Head coach: Sean McDonnell (15th season)
- Offensive coordinator: Ryan Carty (7th season)
- Defensive coordinator: John Lyons (3rd season)
- Home stadium: Cowell Stadium

2013 Colonial Athletic Association football standings
	Conf.			Overall
Team	W		L	W		L
No. 12 Maine $^	7	–	1	10	–	3
No. 2 Towson ^	6	–	2	13	–	3
No. 5 New Hampshire ^	6	–	2	10	–	5
Villanova	5	–	3	6	–	5
Delaware	4	–	4	7	–	5
William & Mary	4	–	4	7	–	5
Richmond	4	–	4	6	–	6
James Madison	3	–	5	6	–	6
Stony Brook	3	–	5	5	–	6
Rhode Island	2	–	6	3	–	9
Albany	0	–	8	1	–	11
$ – Conference champion; ^ – FCS playoff participant; Rankings from The Sports Network poll

The 2013 New Hampshire Wildcats football team represented the University of New Hampshire in the 2013 NCAA Division I FCS football season. They were led by 15th-year head coach Sean McDonnell and played their home games at Cowell Stadium. They were a member of the Colonial Athletic Association. They finished the season 10–5, 6–2 in CAA play to finish in a tie for second place. They received an at-large bid to the FCS Playoffs where they defeated Lafayette, Maine, and Southeastern Louisiana to advance to the semifinals where they lost to North Dakota State.

== Schedule ==
Date	Time	Opponent	Rank	Site	TV	Result	Attendance
September 7	3:00 pm	at Central Michigan*	No. 11	Kelly/Shorts Stadium; Mt. Pleasant, MI	ESPN3	L 21–24	18,210
September 14	12:00 pm	Colgate*	No. 12	Cowell Stadium; Durham, NH	UNHTV	W 53–23	8,020
September 28	12:30 pm	at No. 21 Lehigh*	No. 10	Goodman Stadium; Bethlehem, PA		L 27–34	8,998
October 5	12:00 pm	at No. 3 Towson	No. 19	Johnny Unitas Stadium; Towson, MD	CSN	L 28–44	9,511
October 12	12:00 pm	Rhode Island^{†}	No. 25	Cowell Stadium; Durham, NH	UNHTV	W 59–19	18,412
October 19	12:00 pm	No. 12 Villanova	No. 25	Cowell Stadium; Durham, NH	CSN	W 29–28	6,332
October 26	4:00 pm	at Stony Brook	No. 20	Kenneth P. LaValle Stadium; Stony Brook, NY		W 31–13	5,420
November 2	1:00 pm	at William & Mary	No. 16	Zable Stadium; Williamsburg, VA		L 0–17	8,531
November 9	12:30 pm	No. 22 James Madison	No. 25	Cowell Stadium; Durham, NH	NBCSN	W 33–17	6,084
November 16	3:30 pm	at Albany	No. 23	Bob Ford Field; Albany, NY		W 37–20	6,044
November 23	12:00 pm	No. 4 Maine	No. 21	Cowell Stadium; Durham, NH (Battle for the Brice–Cowell Musket)	CSN	W 24–3	10,333
November 30	12:00 pm	Lafayette*	No. 15	Cowell Stadium; Durham, NH (NCAA Division I First Round)	ESPN3	W 45–7	3,286
December 7	2:00 pm	at No. 10 Maine*	No. 15	Alfond Stadium; Orono, ME (NCAA Division I Second Round)	ESPN3	W 41–27	7,992
December 14	7:00 pm	at No. 7 Southeastern Louisiana*	No. 15	Strawberry Stadium; Hammond, LA (NCAA Division I Quarterfinal)	ESPN3	W 20–17	5,886
December 20	8:00 pm	at No. 1 North Dakota State*	No. 15	Fargodome; Fargo, ND (NCAA Division I Semifinal)	ESPN2	L 14–52	18,694
*Non-conference game; ^{†}Homecoming; Rankings from The Sports Network Poll released prior to the game; All times are in Eastern time

== Ranking movements ==
Ranking movements Legend: ██ Increase in ranking ██ Decrease in ranking RV = Received votes
	Week														
Poll	Pre	1	2	3	4	5	6	7	8	9	10	11	12	13	Final
Sports Network	10	11	12	11	10	19	25	25	20	16	25	23	21	15	5
Coaches	8	8	9	9	7	18	22	23	22	17	RV	RV	24	15	5
