= 2013 Stony Brook Seawolves football team =

American college football season

2013 Stony Brook Seawolves football
- Conference: Colonial Athletic Association
- Record: 5–6 (3–5 CAA)
- Head coach: Chuck Priore (8th season)
- Offensive coordinator: Jeff Behrman (8th season)
- Defensive coordinator: Rob Nevaiser
- Home stadium: Kenneth P. LaValle Stadium

2013 Colonial Athletic Association football standings
	Conf.			Overall
Team	W		L	W		L
No. 12 Maine $^	7	–	1	10	–	3
No. 2 Towson ^	6	–	2	13	–	3
No. 5 New Hampshire ^	6	–	2	10	–	5
Villanova	5	–	3	6	–	5
Delaware	4	–	4	7	–	5
William & Mary	4	–	4	7	–	5
Richmond	4	–	4	6	–	6
James Madison	3	–	5	6	–	6
Stony Brook	3	–	5	5	–	6
Rhode Island	2	–	6	3	–	9
Albany	0	–	8	1	–	11
$ – Conference champion; ^ – FCS playoff participant; Rankings from The Sports Network poll

The 2013 Stony Brook Seawolves football team represented Stony Brook University in the sport of American football during the 2013 NCAA Division I FCS football season. The Seawolves competed in the Football Championship Subdivision (FCS) as first-year members of the Colonial Athletic Association (CAA). This was the team's eighth season under the helm of Chuck Priore. They played their home games at Kenneth P. LaValle Stadium in Stony Brook, New York and attempted to build on their second straight appearance in the FCS playoffs but missed the playoffs after a 3–5 CAA, 5–6 overall record.

== Before the season ==
=== Losses ===
RB Miguel Maysonet, QB Kyle Essington, WR Kevin Norrell, OL Michael Bamiro, DB Dominick Reyes and Cedrick Moore were among the major losses for the team. Bamiro being an unusual case in which he exhausted his collegiate eligibility but missed the NFL draft while being draft eligible. Maysonet, Norrell, Bamiro, and Moore were among those that signed free agent contracts with NFL teams. Maysonet played a crucial role in Stony Brook's running game being a finalist for the Walter Payton Award.

== Broadcasting ==
The 2013 season brought Stony Brook football to the ESPN Radio Network for the first time ever. ESPN Radio Network will broadcast all Seawolves football games in Long Island as it looks to expand its footprint in the region. Champions Radio Network (ESPN Network in Long Island) broadcast all Seawolves football games across the Island in two frequencies. Stony Brook will have one game displayed on ESPN3 and two games under the NBC network with the possibility of a third one being added on Rivalry week. Additional games streamed online in the Patriot League Sports Network (vs. Colgate) and Stony Brooks own streaming service.

== Schedule ==
Stony Brook joins the Colonial Athletic Association and will be facing eight conference opponents. The Seawolves will play a 12-game schedule, taking advantage of an NCAA rule that allows FBS teams to schedule 12 games in years when the period starting with the Thursday before Labor Day and ending with the final Saturday in November contains 14 Saturdays. Originally, Stony Brook scheduled Boston College for the first week of the season, however, due to a schedule conflict with the ACC, Boston College was forced to drop Stony Brook and picked up Villanova. As a result, Stony Brook scheduled Penn in an organized scrimmage with eleven regular season games.

Date	Time	Opponent	Rank	Site	TV	Result	Attendance
September 7	1:00 pm	at Rhode Island	No. 17	Meade Stadium; Kingston, RI		W 24–0	4,302
September 14	3:30 pm	at Buffalo*	No. 17	University at Buffalo Stadium; Amherst, NY	ESPN3	L 23–26 ^{5OT}	24,013
September 21	3:00 pm	at No. 20 Villanova	No. 16	Villanova Stadium; Villanova, PA	SNY/CSN	L 6–35	11,617
September 28	6:00 pm	No. 3 Towson		Kenneth P. LaValle Stadium; Stony Brook, NY	SWTV	L 21–35	7,859
October 5	6:00 pm	Bryant*^{†}		Kenneth P. LaValle Stadium; Stony Brook, NY	SWTV	W 21–13	11,224
October 12	6:00 pm	at Colgate*		Andy Kerr Stadium; Hamilton, NY		W 27–3	3,611
October 26	4:00 pm	No. 20 New Hampshire		Kenneth P. LaValle Stadium; Stony Brook, NY	SWTV	L 13–31	5,420
November 2	12:30 pm	at No. 10 Maine		Alfond Stadium; Orono, ME	FCS	L 14–19	4,068
November 9	1:00 pm	Richmond		Kenneth P. LaValle Stadium; Stony Brook, NY	SWTV	L 31–39	4,787
November 16	3:30 pm	at James Madison		Bridgeforth Stadium; Harrisonburg, VA	CSN/SNY	W 41–38	17,969
November 23	1:00 pm	Albany		Kanneth P. LaValle Stadium; Stony Brook, NY (Rivalry)	SWTV	W 24–3	4,512
*Non-conference game; ^{†}Homecoming; Rankings from The Sports Network Poll released prior to the game; All times are in Eastern time

== Game summaries ==
=== Rhode Island ===
Stony Brook at Rhode Island

Team	1	2	3	4	Total
• #17 Seawolves	3	7	0	14	24
Rams	0	0	0	0	0

- Date: September 7
- Location: Meade Stadium
  Kingston, RI
- Game start: 1:00 pm EDT
- Game attendance: 4,302
- Game weather: 70F, Broken Clouds

Stony Brook will travel to Kingston to open up their 2013 regular season against the Rams. Stony Brook looks to open up the season with a win for the second consecutive season while Rhode Island looks to earn their first victory since 2011 after a win less 2012 campaign. This will be the first ever meeting between both programs.

=== Buffalo ===
Stony Brook at Buffalo

Team	1	2	3	4	OT	Total
#17 Seawolves	0	0	0	10	13	23
• Bulls	3	0	7	0	16	26

- Date: September 14
- Location: University at Buffalo Stadium
  Amherst, NY
- Game start: 3:30 pm EDT
- Game attendance: 24,013
- Television network: ESPN3

Stony Brook will travel to Amherst to face off against the Buffalo Bulls for the second time in three years. After a 35–7 loss at Amherst back in 2011, the Seawolves will look to upset their in-state SUNY rivals and even the series. Buffalo leads the all-time series 1–0.

=== Villanova ===
Stony Brook at Villanova

Team	1	2	3	4	Total
#16 Seawolves	0	0	0	6	6
• #20 Wildcats	0	21	7	7	35

- Date: September 21
- Location: Villanova Stadium
  Villanova, PA
- Game start: TBA EDT
- Television network: NBC Regional

The Seawolves looked to win their second game in as many matches against Villanova. As first year members of the CAA, Stony Brook traveled to Villanova Stadium to face-off against the preseason top-picked Wildcats. Stony Brook led all-time series 1–0.

=== Towson ===
Towson at Stony Brook

Team	1	2	3	4	Total
• #3 Tigers	0	10	7	18	35
Seawolves	14	7	0	0	21

- Date: September 28
- Location: Kenneth P. LaValle Stadium
  Stony Brook, NY
- Game start: TBA EDT

=== Bryant ===
Bryant at Stony Brook

Team	1	2	3	4	Total
Bullodgs	7	0	0	6	13
• Seawolves	14	0	0	7	21

- Date: October 5
- Location: Kenneth P. LaValle Stadium
  Stony Brook, NY
- Game start: TBA EDT

=== Colgate ===
Stony Brook at Colgate

Team	1	2	3	4	Total
• Seawolves	10	14	0	3	27
Raiders	0	0	0	3	3

- Date: October 12
- Location: Andy Kerr Stadium
  Hamilton, NY
- Game start: TBA EDT

=== New Hampshire ===
New Hampshire at Stony Brook

Team	1	2	3	4	Total
• Wildcats	9	7	9	6	31
Seawolves	3	3	7	0	13

- Date: October 26
- Location: Kenneth P. LaValle Stadium
  Stony Brook, NY
- Game start: TBA EDT
- Game attendance: 5,420

=== Maine ===
Stony Brook at Maine

Team	1	2	3	4	Total
Seawolves	0	0	7	7	14
• #10 Black Bears	3	10	0	6	19

- Date: November 2
- Location: Alfond Stadium
  Orono, ME
- Game attendance: 4,068

=== Richmond ===
Richmond at Stony Brook

Team	1	2	Total
Spiders	-	-	0
Seawolves	-	-	0

- Date: November 9
- Location: Kenneth P. LaValle Stadium
  Stony Brook, NY
- Game start: TBA EST

=== James Madison ===
Stony Brook at James Madison

Team	1	2	Total
Seawolves	-	-	0
Dukes	-	-	0

- Date: November 16
- Location: Bridgeforth Stadium
  Harrisonburg, VA
- Game start: TBA EST
- Television network: NBC Regional

=== Albany ===
Albany at Stony Brook
(Albany–Stony Brook rivalry game)

Team	1	2	Total
Great Danes	-	-	0
Seawolves	-	-	0

- Date: November 23
- Location: Kenneth P. LaValle Stadium
  Stony Brook, NY
- Game start: TBA EST

Stony Brook will face Albany, on rivalry week, at Kenneth P. LaValle Stadium renewing a rivalry last played in 2011. Stony Brook and Albany previously played yearly as members of the Northeast Conference until 2007. Arguably the most heated rivalry between state universities in New York, Albany will look to continue its dominance of the series, while Stony Brook looks to extend their series streak after a 31–28 victory in the Football Championship Series playoffs in 2011. Albany leads the all-time series 9–5

== Ranking movements ==
Ranking movements Legend: ██ Increase in ranking ██ Decrease in ranking — = Not ranked RV = Received votes
	Week														
Poll	Pre	1	2	3	4	5	6	7	8	9	10	11	12	13	Final
Sports Network	16	17	17	16	RV	RV	RV	RV	RV	—	—	—	—	—	—
Coaches	13	13	13	12	23	RV	RV	RV	RV	—	—	—	—	—	—
