= 2013 Albany Great Danes football team =

American college football season

2013 Albany Great Danes football
- Conference: Colonial Athletic Association
- Record: 1–11 (0–8 CAA)
- Head coach: Bob Ford (44th season)
- Offensive coordinator: Ryan McCarthy (6th season)
- Defensive coordinator: Mike Simpson (27th season)
- Home stadium: Bob Ford Field

2013 Colonial Athletic Association football standings
	Conf.			Overall
Team	W		L	W		L
No. 12 Maine $^	7	–	1	10	–	3
No. 2 Towson ^	6	–	2	13	–	3
No. 5 New Hampshire ^	6	–	2	10	–	5
Villanova	5	–	3	6	–	5
Delaware	4	–	4	7	–	5
William & Mary	4	–	4	7	–	5
Richmond	4	–	4	6	–	6
James Madison	3	–	5	6	–	6
Stony Brook	3	–	5	5	–	6
Rhode Island	2	–	6	3	–	9
Albany	0	–	8	1	–	11
$ – Conference champion; ^ – FCS playoff participant; Rankings from The Sports Network poll

The 2013 Albany Great Danes football team represented the University at Albany, SUNY as a member of the Colonial Athletic Association (CAA) during the 2013 NCAA Division I FCS football season. Led by Bob Ford in his 44th and final season as head coach, the Great Danes compiled an overall record of 1–11 with a mark of 0–8 in conference play, placing last out of 11 teams in the CAA. The team played home games at the newly-opened Bob Ford Field in Albany, New York. 2013 was the first season of competition for Albany in the CAA, following 14 seasons as a member of the Northeast Conference (NEC).

== Schedule ==
Date	Time	Opponent	Site	TV	Result	Attendance
August 31	12:00 pm	at Duquesne*	Arthur J. Rooney Athletic Field; Pittsburgh, PA		L 24–35	2,001
September 7	6:00 pm	at Colgate*	Andy Kerr Stadium; Hamilton, NY	TWCSC	W 37–34	5,217
September 14	7:00 pm	Rhode Island	Bob Ford Field; Albany, NY	TWCSC	L 13–19 ^{OT}	8,500
September 21	7:00 pm	Central Connecticut*	Bob Ford Field; Albany, NY	TWCSC	L 17–20	6,412
September 28	6:00 pm	at Old Dominion*	Foreman Field; Norfolk, VA (Oyster Bowl)		L 10–66	20,118
October 5	1:30 pm	at James Madison	Bridgeforth Stadium; Harrisonburg, VA		L 13–40	25,201
October 12	12:00 pm	at Delaware	Delaware Stadium; Newark, DE	TWCSC	L 30–33	17,363
October 19	3:30 pm	No. 7 Towson^{†}	Bob Ford Field; Albany, NY	TWCSC	L 17–44	8,500
November 2	4:00 pm	at Richmond	E. Claiborne Robins Stadium; Richmond, VA		L 10–27	8,700
November 9	3:30 pm	No. 8 Maine	Bob Ford Field; Albany, NY	TWCSC	L 27–33	4,912
November 16	3:30 pm	No. 23 New Hampshire	Bob Ford Field; Albany, NY	TWCSC	L 20–37	6,044
November 23	1:00 pm	at Stony Brook	Kenneth P. LaValle Stadium; Stony Brook, NY (rivalry)		L 3–24	4,512
*Non-conference game; ^{†}Homecoming; Rankings from The Sports Network Poll released prior to the game; All times are in Eastern time

== Game summaries ==
=== At Duquesne ===
	1	2	3	4	Total
Great Danes	3	7	7	7	24
Dukes	9	7	16	3	35

=== At Colgate ===
	1	2	3	4	Total
Great Danes	10	14	6	7	37
Raiders	7	7	6	14	34

=== Rhode Island ===
	1	2	3	4	OT	Total
Rams	3	3	7	0	6	19
Great Danes	0	0	13	0	0	13

=== Central Conn St ===
	1	2	3	4	Total
Blue Devils	3	7	0	10	20
Great Danes	3	7	7	0	17

=== At Old Dominion ===
	1	2	3	4	Total
Great Danes	7	0	3	0	10
Monarchs	21	21	10	14	66

=== At James Madison ===
	1	2	3	4	Total
Great Danes	3	0	10	0	13
Dukes	12	14	0	14	40

=== At Delaware ===
	1	2	3	4	Total
Great Danes	3	7	7	13	30
Fightin' Blue Hens	0	16	6	11	33

=== Towson ===
	1	2	3	4	Total
#7 Tigers	3	21	14	6	44
Great Danes	7	3	7	0	17

=== At Richmond ===
	1	2	3	4	Total
Great Danes	7	3	0	0	10
Spiders	3	14	0	10	27

=== Maine ===
	1	2	3	4	Total
#8 Black Bears	7	7	13	6	33
Great Danes	7	7	6	7	27

=== New Hampshire ===
	1	2	3	4	Total
#23 Wildcats	10	10	0	17	37
Great Danes	0	7	7	6	20

=== At Stony Brook ===
	1	2	3	4	Total
Great Danes	0	0	3	0	3
Seawolves	14	7	0	3	24
