= 2014 NCAA Division I Football Championship Game =

Postseason college football game

2014 NCAA Division I Football Championship
- FCS National Championship Game
Towson Tigers	North Dakota State Bison
(13–2)	(14–0)
CAA	MVFC
7	35
Head coach: Rob Ambrose	Head coach: Craig Bohl
TSN / Seed; 5 / 7	TSN / Seed; 1 / 1
	1	2	3	4	Total
Towson	7	0	0	0	7
North Dakota State	7	14	7	7	35
- Date: January 4, 2014
- Season: 2013
- Stadium: Toyota Stadium
- Location: Frisco, Texas
- MVP: Brock Jensen (QB, North Dakota State)
- Favorite: North Dakota State by 16.5
- Referee: Jeff Flanagan (Big South)
- Attendance: 19,802

United States TV coverage
- Network: ESPN2
- Announcers: Anish Shroff (play-by-play), Kelly Stouffer (color), Cara Capuano (sideline)

The 2014 NCAA Division I Football Championship Game was a postseason college football game between the North Dakota State Bison and the Towson Tigers. It was played on January 4, 2014, at Toyota Stadium in Frisco, Texas. The culminating game of the 2013 NCAA Division I FCS football season, it was won by North Dakota State, 35–7.

With sponsorship by Northwestern Mutual, the game was officially known as the NCAA FCS Championship presented by Northwestern Mutual. This was the third consecutive championship for North Dakota State.

== Teams ==
The participants of the Championship Game were the finalists of the 2013 FCS Playoffs, which began with a 24-team bracket. This was the first tournament with 24 teams in the field; it had been 20 teams for the prior three postseasons.

=== North Dakota State Bison ===
North Dakota State finished their regular season with an 11–0 record (8–0 in conference), including a season-opening win over Kansas State of the FBS. As the first-seed in the tournament, the Bison defeated Furman, Coastal Carolina, and New Hampshire to reach the final. This was North Dakota State's third appearance in an FCS/Division I-AA title game, having won the prior two title games. This was the final game for Craig Bohl as head coach of the Bison, as he had accepted on offer to take the same role with Wyoming.

=== Towson Tigers ===
Towson finished their regular season with a 10–2 record (6–2 in conference), including a season-opening win over Connecticut of the FBS. As the seventh-seed in the tournament, the Tigers defeated Fordham, second-seed Eastern Illinois, and third-seed Eastern Washington to reach the final. This was Towson's first appearance in an FCS/Division I-AA championship game.

== Game summary ==
The teams traded touchdowns in the first quarter. In the second quarter, the Bison returned a blocked field goal 59 yards, then scored on the next play to go ahead, 14–7. The Tigers were held scoreless for the remainder of the game, as the Bison won by a 35–7 final score. The Bison became the second team in FCS/Division I-AA history to win three consecutive titles, joining Appalachian State (2005–2007).

=== Scoring summary ===
Scoring summary

Quarter	Time	Drive			Team	Scoring information	Score	
Quarter	Time	Plays	Yards	TOP	Team	Scoring information	TOWS	NDSU
1	5:34	5	54	2:49	NDSU	John Crockett 2-yard touchdown run, Adam Keller kick good	0	7
1	0:00	12	77	5:34	TOWS	Terrance West 2-yard touchdown run, Drew Evangelista kick good	7	7
2	4:43	1	5	0:05	NDSU	Ryan Smith 5-yard touchdown run, Keller kick good	7	14
2	1:05	5	43	1:30	NDSU	Zach Vraa 12-yard touchdown reception from Brock Jensen, Keller kick good	7	21
3	9:09	8	88	4:08	NDSU	Jensen 9-yard touchdown run, Keller kick good	7	28
4	13:09	7	31	3:04	NDSU	Sam Ojuri 1-yard touchdown run, Keller kick good	7	35
"TOP" = time of possession. For other American football terms, see Glossary of American football.							7	35

=== Game statistics ===
	1	2	3	4	Total
No. 7 Tigers	7	0	0	0	7
No. 1 Bison	7	14	7	7	35

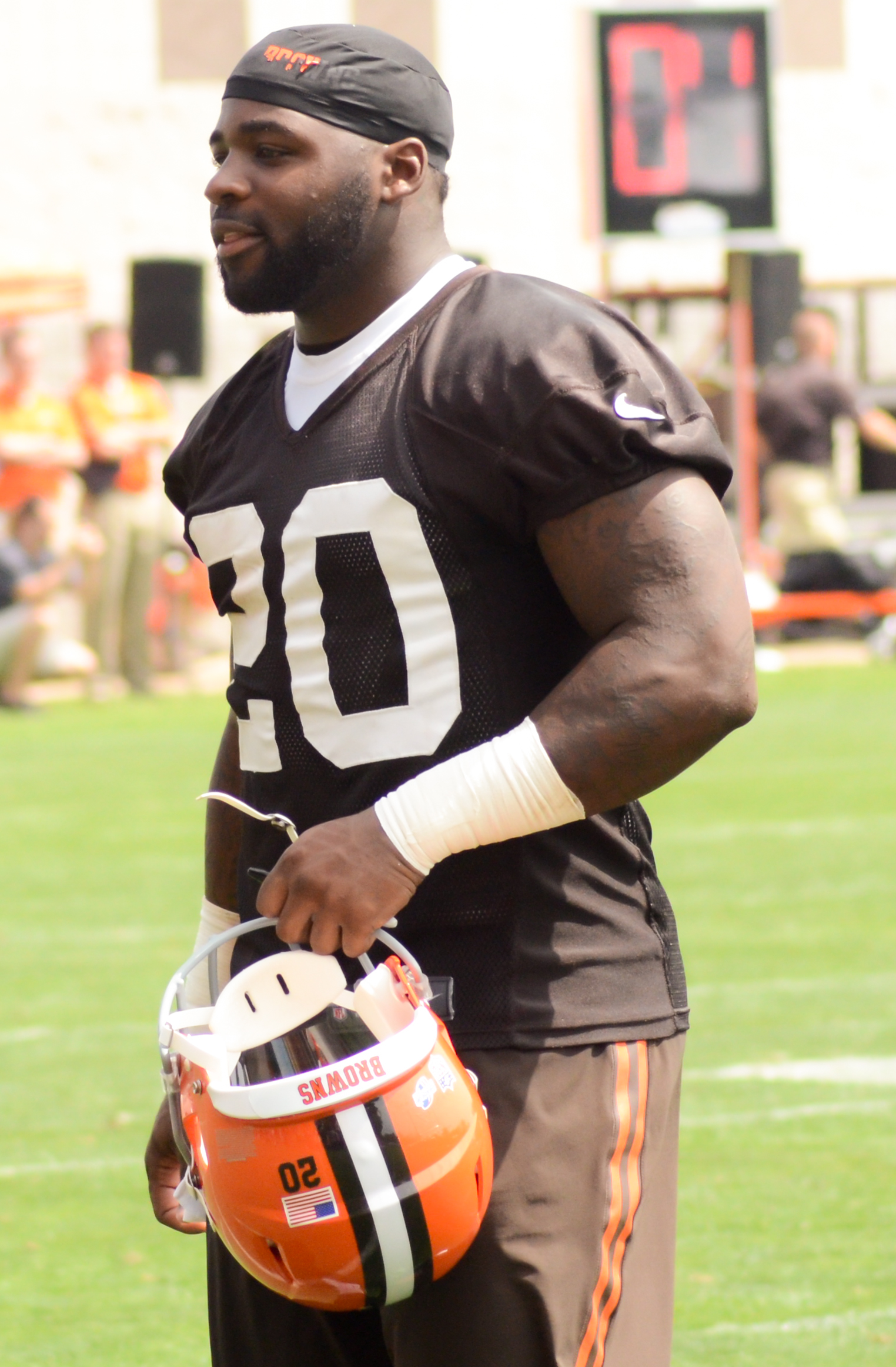
Towson running back Terrance West

Statistics	TOWS	NDSU
First downs	21	15
Plays–yards	79–373	48–345
Rushes–yards	35–106	30–210
Passing yards	28–44–1	13–18–1
Passing: comp–att–int	267	135
Time of possession	33:38	26:22

Team	Category	Player	Statistics
Towson	Passing	Peter Athens	28–44, 267 yds, 1 INT
Towson	Rushing	Terrance West	22 car, 99 yds, 1 TD
Towson	Receiving	Derrick Joseph	5 rec, 61 yds
North Dakota State	Passing	Brock Jensen	13–18, 135 yds, 1 TD
North Dakota State	Rushing	John Crockett	9 car, 86 yds, 1 TD
North Dakota State	Receiving	Zach Vraa	3 rec, 51 yds, 1 TD
