= 2013 Villanova Wildcats football team =

American college football season

2013 Villanova Wildcats football
- Conference: Colonial Athletic Association
- Record: 6–5 (5–3 CAA)
- Head coach: Andy Talley (29th season)
- Offensive coordinator: Sam Venuto (15th season)
- Offensive scheme: Multiple spread
- Defensive coordinator: Billy Crocker (2nd season)
- Base defense: 3–3–5
- Home stadium: Villanova Stadium

2013 Colonial Athletic Association football standings
	Conf.			Overall
Team	W		L	W		L
No. 12 Maine $^	7	–	1	10	–	3
No. 2 Towson ^	6	–	2	13	–	3
No. 5 New Hampshire ^	6	–	2	10	–	5
Villanova	5	–	3	6	–	5
Delaware	4	–	4	7	–	5
William & Mary	4	–	4	7	–	5
Richmond	4	–	4	6	–	6
James Madison	3	–	5	6	–	6
Stony Brook	3	–	5	5	–	6
Rhode Island	2	–	6	3	–	9
Albany	0	–	8	1	–	11
$ – Conference champion; ^ – FCS playoff participant; Rankings from The Sports Network poll

The 2013 Villanova Wildcats football team represented Villanova University in the 2013 NCAA Division I FCS football season. They were led by 29th year head coach Andy Talley and played their home games at Villanova Stadium. They were a member of the Colonial Athletic Association. They finished the season 6–5, 5–3 in CAA play to finish in fourth place.

== Schedule ==
Date	Time	Opponent	Rank	Site	TV	Result	Attendance
August 31	12:00 pm	at Boston College*	No. 5	Alumni Stadium; Chestnut Hill, MA	ESPNews	L 14–24	30,922
September 7	6:00 pm	at Fordham*	No. 8	Coffey Stadium; Bronx, NY		L 24–27	5,178
September 21	3:30 pm	No. 16 Stony Brook	No. 20	Villanova Stadium; Villanova, PA	CSN/SNY	W 35–6	11,617
September 28	5:00 pm	Penn*	No. 19	Villanova Stadium; Villanova, PA	NNAA	W 35–6	8,717
October 5	1:00 pm	William & Mary	No. 20	Villanova Stadium; Villanova, PA	NNAA	W 20–16	6,219
October 12	7:00 pm	at No. 3 Towson	No. 15	Johnny Unitas Stadium; Towson, MD	NBCSN	W 45–35	10,234
October 19	12:00 pm	at No. 25 New Hampshire	No. 12	Cowell Stadium; Durham, NH	CSN	L 28–29	6,332
October 26	1:00 pm	No. 11 Maine	No. 18	Villanova Stadium; Villanova, PA	NNAA	L 35–37	9,017
November 2	2:30 pm	at James Madison	No. 20	Bridgeforth Stadium; Harrisonburg, VA	CSN	L 21–31	21,758
November 9	12:30 pm	at Rhode Island		Meade Stadium; Kingston, RI		W 45–0	4,138
November 23	12:30 pm	vs. Delaware		PPL Park; Chester, PA (Battle of the Blue)		W 35–34	10,117
*Non-conference game; Rankings from The Sports Network Poll released prior to the game; All times are in Eastern time

== Ranking movements ==
Ranking movements Legend: ██ Increase in ranking ██ Decrease in ranking — = Not ranked RV = Received votes
	Week														
Poll	Pre	1	2	3	4	5	6	7	8	9	10	11	12	13	Final
Sports Network	5	8	19	20	19	20	15	12	18	20	RV	RV	RV	RV	RV
Coaches	9	11	20	22	21	20	15	11	17	22	RV	—	—	RV	RV
