= 2013 James Madison Dukes football team =

American college football season

2013 James Madison Dukes football
- Conference: Colonial Athletic Association
- Record: 6–6 (3–5 CAA)
- Head coach: Mickey Matthews (15th season)
- Offensive coordinator: Mike O'Cain (1st season)
- Defensive coordinator: Kyle Gillenwater (5th season)
- Home stadium: Bridgeforth Stadium

2013 Colonial Athletic Association football standings
	Conf.			Overall
Team	W		L	W		L
No. 12 Maine $^	7	–	1	10	–	3
No. 2 Towson ^	6	–	2	13	–	3
No. 5 New Hampshire ^	6	–	2	10	–	5
Villanova	5	–	3	6	–	5
Delaware	4	–	4	7	–	5
William & Mary	4	–	4	7	–	5
Richmond	4	–	4	6	–	6
James Madison	3	–	5	6	–	6
Stony Brook	3	–	5	5	–	6
Rhode Island	2	–	6	3	–	9
Albany	0	–	8	1	–	11
$ – Conference champion; ^ – FCS playoff participant; Rankings from The Sports Network poll

The 2013 James Madison Dukes football team represented James Madison University in the 2013 NCAA Division I FCS football season. They were led by 15th year head coach Mickey Matthews and play their home games at Bridgeforth Stadium and Zane Showker Field. They were a member of the Colonial Athletic Association. They finished the season 6–6, 3–5 in CAA play to finish in a tie for eighth place.

On November 25, head coach Mickey Matthews was fired. He had a record of 109–71 in 15 seasons and won the FCS National Championship in 2004.

== Schedule ==
Date	Time	Opponent	Rank	Site	TV	Result	Attendance
August 31	6:00 pm	Central Connecticut*	No. 19	Bridgeforth Stadium; Harrisonburg, VA	MZSN	W 38–14	23,541
September 7	6:00 pm	at Akron*	No. 20	InfoCision Stadium; Akron, OH	ESPN3	L 33–35	19,653
September 14	6:00 pm	Saint Francis (PA)*	No. 20	Bridgeforth Stadium; Harrisonburg, VA	MZSN	W 24–20	21,276
September 21	6:00 pm	Charlotte*	No. 17	Bridgeforth Stadium; Harrisonburg, VA		W 34–7	18,302
September 28	7:00 pm	at Delaware	No. 14	Delaware Stadium; Newark, DE (rivalry)	CSN	L 22–29	18,405
October 5	1:30 pm	Albany		Bridgeforth Stadium; Harrisonburg, VA		W 40–13	25,201
October 12	3:30 pm	Richmond	No. 21	Bridgeforth Stadium; Harrisonburg, VA (rivalry)	NBCSN	W 38–31	19,029
October 26	3:30 pm	at William & Mary	No. 19	Zable Stadium; Williamsburg, VA (rivalry)	MZSN	L 7–17	12,259
November 2	2:30 pm	No. 20 Villanova^{†}		Bridgeforth Stadium; Harrisonburg, VA	CSN	W 31–21	21,758
November 9	12:30 pm	at No. 25 New Hampshire	No. 22	Cowell Stadium; Durham, NH	NBCSN	L 17–33	6,084
November 16	3:30 pm	Stony Brook		Bridgeforth Stadium; Harrisonburg, VA	CSN	L 38–41	17,969
November 23	3:30 pm	at No. 7 Towson		Johnny Unitas Stadium; Towson, MD	NBCSN	L 17–28	7,379
*Non-conference game; ^{†}Homecoming; Rankings from The Sports Network FCS Poll released prior to game Poll released prior to the game; All times are in Eastern time

- Source: Schedule

== Ranking movements ==
Ranking movements Legend: ██ Increase in ranking ██ Decrease in ranking — = Not ranked RV = Received votes
	Week														
Poll	Pre	1	2	3	4	5	6	7	8	9	10	11	12	13	Final
Sports Network	19	20	20	17	14	RV	21	20	19	RV	22	RV	RV	RV	RV
Coaches	15	15	17	16	14	21	19	19	16	23	18	25	RV	—	—
