= Rob Ambrose =

American football player and coach (born 1970)

Current position
- Title: Defensive analyst
- Team: Maryland
- Conference: Big Ten

Biographical details
- Born: July 30, 1970 (age 56); Skokie, Illinois, U.S.

Playing career
- 1989–1991: Towson
- Position: Wide receiver

Coaching career (HC unless noted)
- 1993–1996: Towson (WR)
- 1997–1999: Towson (OC)
- 2000: Towson (AHC/OC)
- 2001: Catholic University
- 2002–2004: Connecticut (QB)
- 2005: Connecticut (QB/PGC)
- 2006–2008: Connecticut (OC/QB)
- 2009–2022: Towson
- 2023-present: Maryland (defensive analyst)

Head coaching record
- Overall: 79–83
- Tournaments: 3–3 (NCAA D-I playoffs)

Accomplishments and honors

Championships
- 2 CAA (2011, 2012*)

Awards
- Eddie Robinson Award (2011); CAA Coach of the Year (2011); AFCA District Coach of the Year (2011)

Rob Ambrose (born July 30, 1970) is an American college football coach. From 2009 to 2022, he was head coach of the Towson Tigers football team of Towson University. Ambrose was formerly the offensive coordinator of the UConn Huskies before being announced as Towson's head coach in December 2008. Ambrose played wide receiver for Towson in the early 1990s. Ambrose was selected as the Top FCS Coach for the 2011 season. In 2013, Towson advanced to the FCS National Championship Game for the first time in school history. Ambrose played his high school ball at Maryland's Middletown High School.

== Collegiate career ==
As a player at Towson, Ambrose started his career as a quarterback but moved to wide receiver as a sophomore. In 1990, he caught four passes for 20 yards. As a junior, he had four catches for 35 yards. Three of those receptions were touchdown passes from Dan Crowley. He caught an 11-yard TD pass at James Madison, a seven-yard TD toss at Liberty, and a 14-yard TD pass against Hofstra. An injury to his hip and pelvis in the spring prior to his senior year would force Ambrose to the sidelines.

== Coaching career ==
=== As a Towson assistant ===
In the nine years Ambrose spent as a Towson Tiger assistant, the team went 54–36 with only two losing seasons. Ambrose started as a student assistant before being promoted to wide receivers coach in 1993, offensive coordinator in 1997, and then to associate head coach in 2000.

He coached four All-Americans: running back Tony Vinson, quarterback Dan Crowley, and wide receivers Mark Orlando and Jamal White. Vinson led the nation in rushing yards (2,016), all-purpose yards (2,073), and points scored (138) in 1993. Vinson went on to be a fifth-round draft pick of the San Diego Chargers.

In 1999, Towson led the nation in passing yardage, averaging 381.2 passing yards per game.

=== At Catholic ===
Ambrose left Towson after the 2000 season to become the head coach at Catholic University, a Division III program in Washington, D.C. In one year at Catholic, Ambrose led the Cardinals to a 3–7 record.

=== At UConn ===
Ambrose joined the staff at UConn as the Huskies grew from an NCAA Division I-AA program into a major college contender. During his seven seasons in Storrs, CT, the Huskies were 49–36 with just two losing seasons. UConn made three bowl appearances in five years, debuted in the AP National rankings at 16th, and won a share of the Big East title in 2007.

Joining the staff as the quarterbacks coach, Ambrose played a major role in the development of Dan Orlovsky, the first UConn quarterback to play in the NFL. Orlovsky was a fifth-round draft pick by the Detroit Lions. In 2008 as the offensive coordinator, Ambrose coached Donald Brown, an All-American and the 2008 Big East Offensive Player of the Year. Brown led the nation with 2,083 yards on 367 carries and became the first UConn player to be selected in the first round of the NFL draft.

=== As Towson head coach ===
In December 2008, Ambrose was hired as the head coach of his alma mater, Towson University. Ambrose's Tigers did not find immediate success posting a 2–9 record in 2009 and a 1–10 record in 2010.

However, in 2011, just his third season as the Tigers' head coach, Ambrose guided Towson to a dramatic turnaround as the "Turnaround Tigers" went going 9–3. Their 9–2 regular season record included wins over six nationally ranked teams, the team's first outright CAA championship, and the team's first appearance in the NCAA Division I FCS Playoffs. Though they would lose in the first round to Lehigh, the playoff appearance would make Towson the first team to ever earn playoff berths at the Division III, Division II, and Division I-AA levels.

Following the season, Ambrose was honored as the 2011 CAA Coach of the Year, the AFCA District Coach of the Year, and was a finalist for the Liberty Mutual Coach of the Year. In January 2012, he was the recipient of the Eddie Robinson Award as the top coach in FCS football.

During the 2012 season, Ambrose led the Tigers to a 7–4 record against an extremely difficult schedule that included nationally ranked FBS programs in LSU and Kent State. Towson would finish the season with a 6–2 CAA record, good enough for a 4-way tie for second place in the CAA, along with New Hampshire, Villanova, and Richmond. Towson was awarded a share of the CAA Championship following a ruling by the CAA that Old Dominion, who finished at 7–1 in CAA play, was not eligible to win the league title as they had declared that they were leaving the league in 2013. ODU was eligible for the FCS Playoffs, and advanced with an at-large bid, while Towson was not invited to the playoffs, and stayed home.

The motivation for that disappointing end to 2012 was the spark that powered Towson's 2013 campaign, which would prove to be the most successful of Ambrose's coaching career. The Tigers would post a regular season record of 10–2 (6–2 CAA, 2nd place), earning their second playoff berth in three years. Included in those wins was the Tigers' first-ever win over an FBS program, as they defeated UConn, Ambrose's former employer, by a score of 33–18. Towson would reach the playoffs as an at-large bid and shocked the FCS world by reaching the FCS National Championship game with their wins over No. 9 Fordham, No. 2 Eastern Illinois, and No. 3 Eastern Washington in consecutive weeks. The Tigers would lose the championship game to undefeated North Dakota State, who won their third consecutive championship. The Tigers season would end with a record of 13–3 (a school record for wins), the number two ranking in the final FCS polls, with a Lambert/Meadowlands Award as the top FCS team in the East, and as the ECAC FCS Team of the Year. In addition, record-setting running back Terrance West would be drafted in the third round of the 2014 NFL draft by the Cleveland Browns.

Coming off of an NCAA FCS National Championship game appearance the year before, the Tigers battled a plethora of injuries during the 2014 season. Their disappointing season would end with a 4–8 record (2–6 CAA) and the team would miss the playoffs. However, for the second straight year, a Tiger was selected in the NFL draft as Tye Smith was selected in the fifth round by the Seattle Seahawks.

The 2015 season would see a return to Towson's recent success and winning tradition as the team posted a 7–4 (5–3 CAA) record. The team would, however, miss the playoffs for the second straight year and for the third time in four years.

The Tigers posted back-to-back losing seasons in 2016 (4–7) and 2017 (5–6) but returned to the playoffs in 2018, losing a first-round game against Duquesne.

Ambrose was relieved of duty after the 2022 season, in which the Tigers posted a 6–5 record, going 4–4 in conference play. He was the second head coach let go under the leadership of director of athletics Steve Eigenbrot, who assumed his role at Towson that March.

== Personal life ==
Ambrose's brother, Jared Ambrose, is the interim head football coach for the University at Albany, SUNY, a position he has held since 2025.

== Head coaching record ==
Year	Team	Overall	Conference	Standing	Bowl/playoffs	STATS/TSN^{#}	Coaches^{°}
Catholic University Cardinals (Old Dominion Athletic Conference) (2001)
2001	Catholic University	3–7	1–5	7th			
Catholic University:		3–7	1–5				
Towson Tigers (Colonial Athletic Association) (2009–2022)
2009	Towson	2–9	1–7	6th (South)			
2010	Towson	1–10	0–8	10th			
2011	Towson	9–3	7–1	1st	L NCAA Division I Second Round	8	9
2012	Towson	7–4	6–2	T–1st		15	14
2013	Towson	13–3	6–2	T–2nd	L NCAA Division I Championship Game	2	2
2014	Towson	4–8	2–6	10th			
2015	Towson	7–4	5–3	T–4th			
2016	Towson	4–7	3–5	T–8th			
2017	Towson	5–6	3–5	T–7th			
2018	Towson	7–5	5–3	T–3rd	L NCAA Division I First Round	20	22
2019	Towson	7–5	4–4	T–5th			
2020–21	No team—COVID-19						
2021	Towson	4–7	3–5	T–9th			
2022	Towson	6–5	4–4	T–6th			
Towson:		76–76	49–55				
Total:		79–83					
National championship Conference title Conference division title or championship game berth
