= 2013 Richmond Spiders football team =

American college football season

2013 Richmond Spiders football
- Conference: Colonial Athletic Association
- Record: 6–6 (4–4 CAA)
- Head coach: Danny Rocco (2nd season)
- Offensive coordinator: Brandon Streeter (2nd season)
- Defensive coordinator: Bob Trott (4th season)
- Home stadium: E. Claiborne Robins Stadium

2013 Colonial Athletic Association football standings
	Conf.			Overall
Team	W		L	W		L
No. 12 Maine $^	7	–	1	10	–	3
No. 2 Towson ^	6	–	2	13	–	3
No. 5 New Hampshire ^	6	–	2	10	–	5
Villanova	5	–	3	6	–	5
Delaware	4	–	4	7	–	5
William & Mary	4	–	4	7	–	5
Richmond	4	–	4	6	–	6
James Madison	3	–	5	6	–	6
Stony Brook	3	–	5	5	–	6
Rhode Island	2	–	6	3	–	9
Albany	0	–	8	1	–	11
$ – Conference champion; ^ – FCS playoff participant; Rankings from The Sports Network poll

The 2013 Richmond Spiders football team represented the University of Richmond in the 2013 NCAA Division I FCS football season. They were led by second-year head coach Danny Rocco and played their home games at E. Claiborne Robins Stadium. The Spiders played as a member of the Colonial Athletic Association. They finished the season 6–6, 4–4 in CAA play to finish in a three way tie for fifth place.

== Schedule ==
Date	Time	Opponent	Rank	Site	TV	Result	Attendance
August 31	6:00 pm	VMI*	No. 15	Robins Stadium; Richmond, VA (rivalry)	STV	W 34–0	8,700
September 7	6:00 pm	at NC State*	No. 15	Carter–Finley Stadium; Raleigh, NC	ESPN3	L 21–23	50,554
September 14	6:00 pm	at Gardner–Webb*	No. 15	Spangler Stadium; Boiling Springs, NC	ESPN3	L 10–12	5,590
September 21	6:00 pm	Liberty*	No. 23	Robins Stadium; Richmond, VA	STV	W 30–21	8,076
September 28	4:00 pm	Maine	No. 22	Robins Stadium; Richmond, VA	CSN	L 21–28	8,700
October 12	3:30 pm	at No. 21 James Madison		Bridgeforth Stadium; Harrisonburg, VA (rivalry)	NBCSN	L 31–38	19,029
October 19	1:00 pm	at Rhode Island		Meade Stadium; Kingston, RI		L 10–12	7,936
October 26	12:00 pm	No. 8 Towson		Robins Stadium; Richmond, VA	CSN	L 32–48	8,700
November 2	4:00 pm	Albany^{†}		Robins Stadium; Richmond, VA	STV	W 27–10	8,700
November 9	1:00 pm	at Stony Brook		LaValle Stadium; Stony Brook, NY		W 39–31	4,787
November 16	12:00 pm	at No. 21 Delaware		Delaware Stadium; Newark, DE		W 46–43	15,817
November 23	4:00 pm	No. 19 William & Mary		Robins Stadium; Richmond, VA (Capital Cup)	STV	W 31–20	8,700
*Non-conference game; ^{†}Homecoming; Rankings from The Sports Network Poll released prior to the game; All times are in Eastern time

== Ranking movements ==
Ranking movements Legend: ██ Increase in ranking ██ Decrease in ranking — = Not ranked RV = Received votes
	Week														
Poll	Pre	1	2	3	4	5	6	7	8	9	10	11	12	13	Final
Sports Network	15	15	15	23	22	RV	RV	—	—	—	—	—	RV	RV	RV
Coaches	14	12	11	20	20	RV	RV	—	—	—	—	—	—	—	—
