= Jared Ambrose =

American football coach (born 1981 or 1982)

Biographical details
- Born: c. 1981 or 1982 (age 43–44); Middletown, Maryland, U.S.
- Education: Shepherd University (2007); University of Delaware (2009)

Playing career
- c. early 2000s: Shepherd
- Position: Defensive back

Coaching career (HC unless noted)
- 2003–2006: Shepherd (SA)
- 2007–2008: Delaware (GA)
- 2009–2010: Towson (TE)
- 2011: Towson (QB)
- 2012–2018: Towson (OC/QB)
- 2019–2021: Delaware (OC/QB)
- 2022: Albany (co-OC/QB)
- 2023–2024: Albany (assoc. HC/OC/QB)
- 2025: Albany (interim HC)

Head coaching record
- Overall: 2–10

Jared R. Ambrose (born c. 1981 or 1982) is an American former college football coach. He was the interim head football coach for the University at Albany, SUNY, a position he held during the 2025 season. He also coached for Shepherd, Delaware, and Towson.

== Coaching career ==
Ambrose graduated from Middletown High School in Middletown, Maryland. He played high school football under his father, Tim, as a defensive back. During his senior year, he injured his knee, possibly tearing his anterior cruciate ligament (ACL). Ambrose played one season for Shepherd before transitioning to a student assistant role working with the quarterbacks, wide receivers, and tight ends. After graduating in 2007, he became an offensive graduate assistant for Delaware.

In 2009, Ambrose joined his brother, Rob Ambrose, as his tight ends coach. In 2011, he was promoted to quarterbacks coach. After one season he was promoted again, this time as the offensive coordinator. After multiple successful seasons, including a trip to the NCAA Division I Football Championship in 2013, he left his brother's staff for Delaware. He helped lead the Fightin' Blue Hens to a trip to the playoffs alongside coaching future NFL quarterback Nolan Henderson. Ambrose lasted three seasons alongside Danny Rocco before both were fired after a disappointing 5–6 2021 season.

In 2022, Ambrose was hired as the co-offensive coordinator and quarterbacks coach for Albany under head coach Greg Gattuso. After a 3–8 initial campaign, Ambrose was promoted to associate head coach and helped lead the team to a 11–4 season and a trip to the NCAA Division I semifinal. Following Gattuso's resignation after the 2024 season, Ambrose was promoted to interim head coach.

== Personal life ==
Ambrose and his wife have three children. Ambrose's brother, Rob Ambrose, was the head football coach for Catholic University of America in 2001 and Towson University from 2009 to 2022.

== Head coaching record ==
Year	Team	Overall	Conference	Standing	Bowl/playoffs
Albany Great Danes (Coastal Athletic Association Football Conference) (2025)
2025	Albany	2–10	1–7	T–12th	
Albany:		2–10	1–7		
Total:		2–10			
