= Jerome Couplin =

American football player (born 1991)

No. 24, 30, 21, 42, 41, 22
- Position: Safety

Personal information
- Born: August 31, 1991 (age 35); Washington, D.C., U.S.
- Listed height: 6 ft 2 in (1.88 m)
- Listed weight: 215 lb (98 kg)

Career information
- High school: Bishop McNamara (Forestville, Maryland)
- College: William & Mary (2009–2013)
- NFL draft: 2014: undrafted

Career history
- Detroit Lions (2014); Buffalo Bills (2014); Detroit Lions (2014)*; Philadelphia Eagles (2014–2015); Los Angeles Rams (2016–2017)*; Hamilton Tiger-Cats (2018); Orlando Apollos (2019); Los Angeles Wildcats (2020)
- * Offseason or practice squad member only

Awards and highlights
- Consensus FCS All-American (2013); First-team All-CAA (2013); Third-team All-CAA (2012)

Career NFL statistics
- Total tackles: 7
- Stats at Pro Football Reference

Jerome Ellsworth Couplin III (born August 31, 1991) is an American former professional football player who was a safety in the National Football League (NFL). He played college football for the William & Mary Tribe. He went undrafted in the 2014 NFL draft before signing with the Detroit Lions.

== Early life ==
Couplin grew up in Upper Marlboro, Maryland. He attended Bishop McNamara High School in Forestville, Maryland and played high school football for the Mustangs. He was a two-year letterwinner as a wide receiver and safety for head coach Bryce Bevill. Couplin registered 685 receiving yards and six touchdowns as a receiver while totaling 67 tackles, two sacks and an interception as a defensive back in 2008. He was named first-team All-WCAC, first-team All-County, first-team All-DCSportsfan, honorable mention Washington Post All-Met and honorable mention All-State accolades at wide receiver. Also was voted a team captain his senior year.

On February 4, 2009, Couplin signed a National Letter of Intent to play college football for the College of William & Mary.

He was also a standout track athlete at Bishop McNamara. He earned All-WCAC honors as a triple jumper. In addition, he was a member of the nationally ranked Bishop McNamara basketball team.

== College career ==
Couplin enrolled in the College of William & Mary, where he played for the William & Mary Tribe football team from 2009 to 2013. After redshirting in 2009, he worked his way to becoming a three-year starter at safety for the Tribe. He appeared in 45 games with 31 starts. His career stats at the College consisted of 257 tackles (158 solo), five interceptions, 21 passes defended, five forced fumbles, one fumble recovery and 2 touchdowns.

In 2010, he competed in 11 games as a reserve in the Tribe defensive backfield and a contributor on special teams, finishing the season with six tackles and one interception. He returned the interception 22 yards for a touchdown against VMI. Helped the Tribe win the CAA Championship and ranked as high as #1 in the FCS.

In 2011, he appeared in all 11 games and started 8 games with 47 tackles, one interception, six pass breakups, and one forced fumble. He had his best performance of the season against sixth-ranked New Hampshire with an interception and five solo tackles in the game.

In 2012, he had a breakout junior season emerging as one of the league's top safeties, earning third-team All-CAA honors. He ranked fifth in the CAA with 8.3 tackles per game while the average led the league among defensive backs. He started all 11 games and recorded a team-high 91 tackles with three interceptions, two tackles for a loss, two forced fumbles and four pass breakups. He opened the season with five tackles, including 1.5 tackles for loss, and a forced fumble at Maryland. He posted five double-digit tackle performances including a career-high 15 tackles at Towson.

In 2013, he was voted team captain during his redshirt senior year. Established himself as one of the nation's top defensive players as he was a finalist for the Buchanan Award. He was named consensus first-team All-America honors from the Associated Press, The Sports Network, the Walter Camp Football Foundation, the College Sporting News and Phil Steele. Also earned the accolades of first-team All-CAA selection first-team ECAC All-Star and first-team VaSID All-State honoree. He ranked third in the conference with 9.1 tackles per game, a figure that ranked first among defensive backs and ranked 11th nationally in solo tackles per game (5.8) which led all defensive backs in the Colonial Athletic Association (CAA). While starting all 11 games, led the team in tackling for the second consecutive season (113 tackles, 70 solo) while also totaling 2.5 tackles for a loss, six pass breakups, two forced fumble and one fumble recovery, which was returned 51 yards for a touchdown. Recorded double-digit tackle totals in six games, and was honored as the CAA Defensive Player of the Week following his performance against Delaware. At the conclusion of the season, he was voted the Tribe's Defensive Player of the Year.

Couplin was initiated as a member of Kappa Alpha Psi fraternity at William and Mary.

== Professional career ==
=== Pre-draft ===
Couplin did not manage to receive an invite to the NFL Combine. However, he showed excellent athleticism at his 2014 Pro Day. At his Pro Day on March 18, Couplin ran the 40-yard dash in 4.5 seconds, performed 18 reps on the 225-pound bench press, ran the short shuttle in 4.41 seconds and the three-cone drill in 6.94 seconds. He also had a vertical of 41.5 inches and a standing broad jump of 11 feet 2 inches, all accomplished outside in rainy, 32-degree conditions. Couplin's results in the standing broad jump are the best for a safety in the last 10 years at the combine and his vertical would have been first among safeties at this year's combine.

=== Detroit Lions ===
Couplin was not selected in the 2014 NFL draft. However, he was considered a high-priority free agent and received several contract offers right after the draft. Couplin signed with the Detroit Lions on May 12 as an undrafted free agent. He made the initial 53-man roster prior to the start of the 2014 NFL season. His first regular season playing time came in week 1 against the New York Giants, which was also a Monday Night Football game. He recorded two tackles in the game on defense as a reserve. After playing in the first seven games of the season for the Lions, he was waived on October 19. Once he cleared waivers, he was re-signed by the Lions as a practice squad member. After spending the week as a practice squad member, he was promoted back to the active roster the day before their game against the Atlanta Falcons in London. He managed to play in the game as well. He was released again on November 1.

=== Buffalo Bills ===
The Buffalo Bills claimed Couplin off waivers from the Lions on November 3. He was inactive for the only game he was on the roster for, and he was waived on November 11.

=== Second stint with Lions ===
The Lions re-signed Couplin to their practice squad on November 13 after clearing waivers and spent four weeks on the team's practice squad.

=== Philadelphia Eagles ===
The Philadelphia Eagles signed Couplin off of the Lions' practice squad on December 10, 2014. He was released on May 2, 2016.

=== Los Angeles Rams ===
On December 19, 2016, Couplin was signed to the Rams' practice squad. He signed a reserve/future contract with the Rams on January 3, 2017. On May 3, 2017, he was waived by the Rams.

=== Hamilton Tiger-Cats ===
The Hamilton Tiger-Cats signed Couplin as a free agent on April 20, 2018. He was released on August 28, 2018.

=== Orlando Apollos ===
On September 20, 2018, Couplin signed with the Orlando Apollos. The league ceased operations in April 2019. Couplin had 27 tackles and forced a fumble in 8 games.

=== Los Angeles Wildcats ===
Couplin was selected in the 8th round during phase four in the 2020 XFL draft by the Los Angeles Wildcats. He had his contract terminated when the league suspended operations on April 10, 2020.
