= 2013 NCAA Division I FCS football rankings =

The following weekly polls comprise the 2013 NCAA Division I FCS football rankings which determine the top 25 teams at the NCAA Division I Football Championship Subdivision level of college football for the 2013 season. The Sports Network poll is voted by media members while the Coaches' Poll is determined by coaches at the FCS level. Schools in transition to the NCAA Division I Football Bowl Subdivision level of college football (including Old Dominion, Appalachian State, and Georgia Southern) were ineligible for the Coaches' Poll.

== Legend ==
Legend
	Increase in ranking
	Decrease in ranking
	Not ranked previous week
Italics	Number of first place votes
(#–#)	Win–loss record
т	Tied with team above or below also with this symbol

== The Sports Network poll ==
	Preseason Aug 13	Week 1 Sep 2	Week 2 Sep 10	Week 3 Sep 16	Week 4 Sep 23	Week 5 Sep 30	Week 6 Oct 7	Week 7 Oct 14	Week 8 Oct 21	Week 9 Oct 28	Week 10 Nov 4	Week 11 Nov 11	Week 12 Nov 18	Week 13 Nov 24	Week 14 (Final) Jan 8	
1.	North Dakota State (127)	North Dakota State (145) (1–0)	North Dakota State (146) (2–0)	North Dakota State (154) (2–0)	North Dakota State (157) (3–0)	North Dakota State (157) (4–0)	North Dakota State (157) (5–0)	North Dakota State (161) (6–0)	North Dakota State (156) (7–0)	North Dakota State (159) (8–0)	North Dakota State (159) (8–0)	North Dakota State (156) (9–0)	North Dakota State (155) (10–0)	North Dakota State (143) (11–0)	North Dakota State (142) (15–0)	1.
2.	Montana State (1)	Eastern Washington (7) (1–0)	Eastern Washington (6) (2–0)	Eastern Washington (2) (2–1)	Eastern Washington (1) (2–1)	Sam Houston State (1) (4–1)	Sam Houston State (4–1)	Sam Houston State (5–1)	Eastern Illinois (6–1)	Eastern Illinois (7–1)	Eastern Illinois (8–1)	Eastern Illinois (9–1)	Eastern Illinois (10–1)	Eastern Illinois (11–1)	Towson (13–3)	2.
3.	Sam Houston State (5)	Montana State (1–0)	Montana State (1–1)	Montana State (2–1)	Towson (4–0)	Towson (5–0)	Towson (6–0)	Eastern Illinois (5–1)	Eastern Washington (5–2)	Eastern Washington (6–2)	Eastern Washington (7–2)	Eastern Washington (8–2)	Eastern Washington (9–2)	Eastern Washington (10–2)	Eastern Washington (13–3)	3.
4.	Eastern Washington	Sam Houston State (1–0)	Towson (2–0)	Towson (3–0)	Sam Houston State (3–1)	Northern Iowa (4–0)	Northern Iowa (4–1)	Eastern Washington (4–2)	McNeese State (6–1)	McNeese State (7–1)	Montana State (7–2)	Sam Houston State (8–2)	Maine (10–1)	Montana (10–2)	Eastern Illinois (12–2)	4.
5.	Villanova	Towson (1–0)	Sam Houston State (1–1)	Sam Houston State (2–1)	Northern Iowa (3–0)	Eastern Illinois (4–1)	Eastern Illinois (4–1)	Montana State (4–2)	Montana State (5–2)	Montana State (6–2)	Coastal Carolina (9–0)	Fordham (10–0)	Montana (9–2)	Towson (10–2)	New Hampshire (10–5)	5.
6.	South Dakota State	South Dakota State (1–0)	South Dakota State (2–0)	South Dakota State (3–0)	South Dakota State (3–1)	Eastern Washington (2–2)	Eastern Washington (3–2)	Coastal Carolina (6–0)	Coastal Carolina (7–0)	Coastal Carolina (8–0)	Sam Houston State (7–2)	Maine (9–1)	McNeese State (9–2)	McNeese State (10–2)	Southeastern Louisiana (11–3)	6.
7.	Central Arkansas	Central Arkansas (1–0)	Northern Iowa (2–0)	Northern Iowa (2–0)	Montana (3–0)	South Dakota State (3–2)	Montana State (4–2)	Towson (6–1)	Sam Houston State (5–2)	Towson (8–1)	Fordham (9–0)	Montana (8–2)	Towson (9–2)	Southeastern Louisiana (10–2)	Coastal Carolina (12–3)	7.
8.	Wofford	Villanova (0–1)	Central Arkansas (1–1)	Eastern Illinois (3–0)	Eastern Illinois (3–1)	Montana State (3–2)	Coastal Carolina (5–0)	Fordham (7–0)	Towson (7–1)	Sam Houston State (6–2)	Maine (8–1)	Montana State (7–3)	Southeastern Louisiana (9–2)	Northern Arizona (9–2)	Montana (10–3)	8.
9.	Georgia Southern (1)	Northern Iowa (1–0)	Eastern Illinois (2–0)	Montana (2–0)	McNeese State (4–0)	Coastal Carolina (5–0)	McNeese State (5–1)	McNeese State (5–1)	Fordham (8–0)	Fordham (8–0)	Youngstown State (8–1)	McNeese State (8–2)	Sam Houston State (8–3)	Fordham (11–1)	Fordham (12–2)	9.
10.	New Hampshire	Georgia Southern (1–0)	Georgia Southern (2–0)	Wofford (2–1)	New Hampshire (1–1)	Montana (3–1)	Fordham (6–0)	Montana (5–1)	Montana (6–1)	Maine (7–1)	Montana (7–2)	Towson (8–2)	Northern Arizona (8–2)	Maine (10–2)	Jacksonville State (11–4)	10.
11.	Towson	New Hampshire (0–0)	Montana (1–0)	New Hampshire (1–1)	Montana State (2–2)	McNeese State (4–1)	Montana (4–1)	Northern Iowa (4–2)	Maine (6–1)	Youngstown State (7–1)	McNeese State (7–2)	Coastal Carolina (9–1)	Coastal Carolina (10–1)	Coastal Carolina (10–2)	McNeese State (10–3)	11.
12.	Appalachian State	Cal Poly (1–0)	New Hampshire (0–1)	McNeese State (3–0)	Coastal Carolina (4–0)	Fordham (5–0)	Wofford (3–2)	Villanova (4–2)	Wofford (5–2)	Montana (6–2)	Bethune-Cookman (8–1)	Northern Arizona (7–2)	Fordham (10–1)	Bethune-Cookman (10–2)	Maine (10–3)	12.
13.	Illinois State	Montana (1–0)	McNeese State (2–0)	Central Arkansas (1–2)	Central Arkansas (2–2)	Lehigh (4–0)	South Dakota State (3–3)	Wofford (4–2)	Youngstown State (7–1)	Bethune-Cookman (7–1)	Towson (8–2)	Charleston Southern (10–1)	Montana State (7–4)	South Dakota State (8–4)	South Dakota State (9–5)	13.
14.	Cal Poly	Eastern Illinois (1–0)	Cal Poly (1–1)	Georgia Southern (2–1)	James Madison (3–1)	Central Arkansas (2–2)	Maine (5–1)	Maine (5–1)	Bethune-Cookman (6–1)	Northern Arizona (6–2)	Northern Arizona (7–2)	Southeastern Louisiana (8–2)	Bethune-Cookman (9–2)	Sam Houston State (8–4)	Sam Houston State (9–5)	14.
15.	Richmond	Richmond (1–0)	Richmond (1–1)	Coastal Carolina (3–0)	Georgia Southern (2–1)	Northern Arizona (3–1)	Villanova (3–2)	South Dakota State (4–3)	Lehigh (6–1)	Samford (6–2)	Delaware (7–2)	Youngstown State (8–2)	Youngstown State (8–3)	New Hampshire (7–4)	Northern Arizona (9–3)	15.
16.	Stony Brook	Wofford (0–1)	Wofford (1–1)	Stony Brook (1–1)	Fordham (4–0)	Georgia Southern (3–1)	Bethune-Cookman (4–1)	Youngstown State (6–1)	Northern Arizona (5–2)	New Hampshire (4–3)	Southeastern Louisiana (7–2)	William & Mary (7–3)	South Dakota State (7–4)	Montana State (7–5)	Bethune-Cookman (10–3)	16.
17.	Northern Iowa	Stony Brook (0–0)	Stony Brook (1–0)	James Madison (2–1)	Wofford (2–2)	Wofford (2–2)	Lehigh (4–1)	Bethune-Cookman (5–1)	Northern Iowa (4–3)	Wofford (5–3)	Wofford (5–3)	Chattanooga (8–2)	Lehigh (8–2)	Youngstown State (8–4)	Tennessee State (10–4)	17.
18.	Northern Arizona	McNeese State (1–0)	Illinois State (0–1)	Cal Poly (1–2)	Cal Poly (1–2)	Cal Poly (2–2)	Youngstown State (5–1)	Lehigh (5–1)	Villanova (4–3)	Central Arkansas (5–3)	Charleston Southern (9–1)	Bethune-Cookman (8–2)	Charleston Southern (10–2)	Samford (8–4)	Youngstown State (8–4)	18.
19.	James Madison	Illinois State (0–1)	Villanova (0–2)	Bethune-Cookman (3–0)	Villanova (1–2)	New Hampshire (1–2)	Northern Arizona (3–2)	Northern Arizona (4–2)	James Madison (5–2)	South Dakota State (5–4)	South Dakota State (5–4)	South Dakota State (6–4)	William & Mary (7–4)	Tennessee State (9–3)	Samford (8–5)	19.
20.	Montana	James Madison (1–0)	James Madison (1–1)	Villanova (0–2)	Bethune-Cookman (3–1)	Villanova (2–2)	Central Arkansas (2–3)	James Madison (5–2)	New Hampshire (3–3)	Villanova (4–4)	Samford (6–3)	Lehigh (7–2)	Southern Utah (8–3)	Jacksonville State (9–3)	Montana State (7–5)	20.
21.	Eastern Illinois	Appalachian State (0–1)	Coastal Carolina (2–0)	Fordham (3–0)	Lehigh (3–0)	Bethune-Cookman (3–1)	James Madison (4–2)	Central Arkansas (3–3)	Tennessee State (7–1)	Delaware (6–2)	Lehigh (6–2)	Delaware (7–3)	New Hampshire (6–4)	Chattanooga (8–4)	Southern Utah (8–5)	21.
22.	Lehigh	Northern Arizona (0–1)	Lehigh (1–0)	Lehigh (2–0)	Richmond (2–2)	UT Martin (3–1)	Georgia Southern (3–2)	Samford (5–2)	Samford (5–2)	Lehigh (6–2)	James Madison (6–3)	Jacksonville State (8–2)	Princeton (8–1)	Southern Utah (8–4)	Furman (8–6)	22.
23.	Bethune-Cookman	Lehigh (0–0)	Bethune-Cookman (2–0)	Richmond (1–2)	UT Martin (2–1)	Maine (4–1)	Samford (4–2)	Georgia Southern (4–2)	Central Arkansas (4–3)	Tennessee State (7–2)	William & Mary (6–3)	New Hampshire (5–4)	Chattanooga (8–3)	Charleston Southern (10–3)	Chattanooga (8–4)	23.
24.	Chattanooga	Coastal Carolina (1–0)	Youngstown State (2–0)	UT Martin (2–1)	Northern Arizona (2–1)	Delaware (4–1)	Jacksonville State (5–1)	Tennessee State (6–1)	Georgia Southern (4–2)	Charleston Southern (8–1)	Chattanooga (7–2)	Wofford (5–4)	Samford (7–4)	Lehigh (8–3)	Charleston Southern (10–3)	24.
25.	Coastal Carolina	Bethune-Cookman (1–0)	Northern Arizona (0–1)	Northern Arizona (1–1)	Gardner–Webb (3–1)	Gardner–Webb (4–1)	New Hampshire (1–3)	New Hampshire (2–3)	South Dakota State (4–4)	Southeastern Louisiana (6–2)	New Hampshire (4–4)	Princeton (7–1)	Tennessee State (9–3)	South Carolina State (9–3)	South Carolina State (9–4)	25.
	Preseason Aug 13	Week 1 Sep 2	Week 2 Sep 10	Week 3 Sep 16	Week 4 Sep 23	Week 5 Sep 30	Week 6 Oct 7	Week 7 Oct 14	Week 8 Oct 21	Week 9 Oct 28	Week 10 Nov 4	Week 11 Nov 11	Week 12 Nov 18	Week 13 Nov 24	Week 14 (Final) Jan 8	
		Dropped: 24. Chattanooga (0–1)	Dropped: 21. Appalachian State (0–2)	Dropped: 18. Illinois State (0–2); 24. Youngstown State (2–1)	Dropped: 16. Stony Brook (1–2)	Dropped: 14. James Madison (3–2); 22. Richmond (2–3)	Dropped: 18. Cal Poly (2–3); 22. UT Martin (3–2); 24. Delaware (4–2); 25. Gardner–Webb (4–2)	Dropped: 24. Jacksonville State (5–2)	None	Dropped: 17. Northern Iowa (4–4); 19. James Madison (5–3); 24. Georgia Southern (4–3)	Dropped: 17. Central Arkansas (5–4); 20. Villanova (4–5); 23. Tennessee State (7–3)	Dropped: 20. Samford (6–4); 22. James Madison (6–4)	Dropped: 21. Delaware (7–4); 22. Jacksonville State (8–3); 24. Wofford (5–5)	Dropped: 19. William & Mary (7–5); 22. Princeton (8–2)	Dropped: 24. Lehigh (8–3)	

== Coaches' Poll ==
	Preseason Aug 6	Week 1 Sep 2	Week 2 Sep 9	Week 3 Sep 16	Week 4 Sep 23	Week 5 Sep 30	Week 6 Oct 7	Week 7 Oct 14	Week 8 Oct 21	Week 9 Oct 28	Week 10 Nov 4	Week 11 Nov 11	Week 12 Nov 18	Week 13 Nov 25	Week 14 (Final) Jan 8	
1.	North Dakota State (23)	North Dakota State (26) (1–0)	North Dakota State (26) (2–0)	North Dakota State (26) (2–0)	North Dakota State (26) (3–0)	North Dakota State (26) (4–0)	North Dakota State (25) (5–0)	North Dakota State (26) (6–0)	North Dakota State (26) (7–0)	North Dakota State (26) (8–0)	North Dakota State (26) (8–0)	North Dakota State (26) (9–0)	North Dakota State (26) (10–0)	North Dakota State (25) (11–0)	North Dakota State (20) (15–0)	1.
2.	Montana State (1)	Eastern Washington (1–0)	Eastern Washington (2–0)	Montana State (2–1)	Towson (4–0)	Towson (5–0)	Towson (6–0)	Sam Houston State (5–1)	Eastern Illinois (6–1)	Eastern Illinois (7–1)	Eastern Illinois (9–1)	Eastern Illinois (9–1)	Eastern Illinois (10–1)	Eastern Illinois (11–1)	Towson (13–3)	2.
3.	Eastern Washington	Montana State (1–0)	Montana State (1–1)	Towson (3–0)	Eastern Washington (2–1)	Sam Houston State (4–1)	Sam Houston State (4–1)	Eastern Illinois (5–1)	Coastal Carolina (7–0)	Coastal Carolina (8–0)	Coastal Carolina (9–0)	Eastern Washington (8–2)	Eastern Washington (9–2)	Eastern Washington (10–2)	Eastern Washington (13–3)	3.
4.	Sam Houston State (1)	Sam Houston State (1–0)	Towson (2–0)	Eastern Washington (2–1)	Sam Houston State (3–1)	Northern Iowa (4–0)	Eastern Illinois (4–1)	Coastal Carolina (6–0)	Eastern Washington (5–2)	Eastern Washington (6–2)	Eastern Washington (7–2)	Sam Houston State (8–2)	Maine (10–1)	Towson (10–2)	Eastern Illinois (12–2)	4.
5.	Wofford	Central Arkansas (1–0)	Sam Houston State (1–1)	Sam Houston State (2–1)	Northern Iowa (3–0)	Eastern Illinois (4–1)	Northern Iowa (4–1)	Montana State (4–2)	Montana State (5–2)	Montana State (6–2)	Montana State (7–2)	Fordham (10–0)	Towson (9–2)	Montana (10–2)	New Hampshire (10–5)	5.
6.	Central Arkansas	Towson (1–0)	South Dakota State (2–0)	South Dakota State (3–0)	South Dakota State (3–1)	Coastal Carolina (5–0)	Coastal Carolina (5–0)	Eastern Washington (4–2)	Towson (7–1)	Towson (8–1)	Fordham (9–0)	Maine (9–1)	Montana (9–2)	McNeese State (10–2)	Southeastern Louisiana (11–3)	6.
7.	South Dakota State	South Dakota State (1–0)	Central Arkansas (1–1)	Northern Iowa (2–0)	New Hampshire (2–1) т	Montana State (3–2)	Montana State (4–2)	Towson (6–1)	McNeese State (6–1)	McNeese State (7–1)	Sam Houston State (7–2)	Towson (8–2)	Coastal Carolina (10–1)	Southeastern Louisiana (10–2)	Coastal Carolina (12–3)	7.
8.	New Hampshire	New Hampshire (0–0)	Northern Iowa (2–0)	Wofford (2–1)	Montana (3–0) т	Eastern Washington (2–2)	Eastern Washington (3–2)	Fordham (7–0)	Fordham (8–0) т	Fordham (8–0)	Youngstown State (8–1)	Montana (8–2)	McNeese State (9–2)	Maine (10–2)	Montana (10–3)	8.
9.	Villanova	Northern Iowa (1–0)	New Hampshire (0–1)	New Hampshire (1–1)	McNeese (4–0)	South Dakota State (3–2)	Fordham (6–0)	Montana (5–1)	Sam Houston State (5–2) т	Sam Houston State (6–2)	Maine (8–1)	Coastal Carolina (9–1)	Sam Houston State (8–3)	Northern Arizona (9–2)	McNeese State (10–3)	9.
10.	Illinois State	Cal Poly (1–0)	Wofford (1–1)	Eastern Illinois (3–0)	Montana State (2–2)	Lehigh (4–0)	Montana (4–1)	McNeese State (5–1)	Montana (6–1)	Youngstown State (7–1)	Bethune-Cookman (8–1)	Montana State (7–3)	Southeastern Louisiana (9–2)	Fordham (11–1)	Fordham (12–2)	10.
11.	Cal Poly	Villanova (0–1)	Richmond (1–1)	Montana (2–0)	Coastal Carolina (4–0)	Central Arkansas (2–2)	McNeese State (5–1)	Villanova (4–2)	Wofford (5–2)	Maine (7–1)	Towson (8–2)	McNeese State (8–2)	Fordham (10–1)	Coastal Carolina (10–2)	Maine (10–3)	11.
12.	Towson	Richmond (1–0)	Eastern Illinois (2–0)	Stony Brook (1–1)	Eastern Illinois (3–1)	Montana (3–1)	Wofford (3–2)	Wofford (4–2)	Youngstown State (7–1)	Bethune-Cookman (7–1)	Montana (7–2)	Charleston Southern (10–1)	Northern Arizona (8–2)	Bethune-Cookman (10–2)	Jacksonville State (12–2)	12.
13.	Stony Brook	Stony Brook (0–0)	Stony Brook (1–0)	McNeese State (3–0)	Central Arkansas (2–2)	Fordham (5–0)	Bethune-Cookman (4–1)	Northern Iowa (4–2)	Bethune-Cookman (6–1)	Montana (6–2)	McNeese State (7–2)	Northern Arizona (7–2)	Montana State (7–4)	South Dakota State (8–4)	Sam Houston State (9–5)	13.
14.	Richmond	Wofford (0–1)	Cal Poly (1–1)	Central Arkansas (1–2)	James Madison (3–1)	McNeese State (4–1)	Lehigh (4–1)	Bethune-Cookman (5–1)	Maine (6–1)	Northern Arizona (6–2)	Northern Arizona (7–2)	Southeastern Louisiana (8–2)	Bethune-Cookman (9–2)	Sam Houston State (8–4)	South Dakota State (9–5)	14.
15.	James Madison	James Madison (1–0)	Montana (1–0)	Coastal Carolina (3–0)	Wofford (2–2)	Wofford (2–2)	Villanova (3–2)	Youngstown State (6–1)	Lehigh (6–1)	Central Arkansas (5–3)	Wofford (5–3)	Youngstown State (8–2)	Lehigh (8–2)	New Hampshire (7–4)	Northern Arizona (9–3)	15.
16.	Northern Iowa	Eastern Illinois (1–0)	Illinois State (0–1)	James Madison (2–1)	Fordham (4–0)	Bethune-Cookman (3–1)	Youngstown State (5–1)	Lehigh (5–1)	James Madison (5–2)	Wofford (5–3)	Charleston Southern (9–1)	Bethune-Cookman (8–2)	Charleston Southern (10–2)	Samford (8–4)	Bethune-Cookman (10–3)	16.
17.	Lehigh	Illinois State (0–0)	James Madison (1–1)	Bethune-Cookman (3–0)	Lehigh (3–0)	Northern Arizona (3–1)	Maine (5–1)	Maine (5–1)	Villanova (4–3)	New Hampshire (4–3)	Southeastern Louisiana (7–2)	Lehigh (7–2)	South Dakota State (7–4)	Tennessee State (9–3)	Tennessee State (10–4)	17.
18.	Northern Arizona	Montana (1–0)	McNeese State (2–0)	Lehigh (2–0)	Bethune-Cookman (3–1)	New Hampshire (1–2)	South Dakota State (3–3)	South Dakota State (4–3)	Northern Iowa (4–3)	Charleston Southern (8–1)	James Madison (6–3)	Chattanooga (8–2)	Youngstown State (8–3)	Montana State (7–5)	Samford (8–5)	18.
19.	Eastern Kentucky (1)	Lehigh (0–0)	Lehigh (1–0)	Cal Poly (1–2)	Cal Poly (1–2)	Cal Poly (2–2)	James Madison (4–2)	James Madison (5–2)	Northern Arizona (5–2)	Samford (6–2)	Lehigh (6–2)	South Dakota State (6–4)	Princeton (8–1)	Youngstown State (8–4)	Youngstown State (8–4)	19.
20.	Bethune-Cookman	McNeese State (1–0)	Villanova (0–2)	Richmond (1–2)	Richmond (2–2)	Villanova (2–2)	Central Arkansas (2–3)	Central Arkansas (3–3)	Central Arkansas (4–3)	South Dakota State (5–4)	South Dakota State (5–4)	William & Mary (7–3)	William & Mary (7–4)	Charleston Southern (10–3)	Montana State (7–5)	20.
21.	Coastal Carolina	Eastern Kentucky (1–0)	Coastal Carolina (2–0)	Fordham (3–0)	Villanova (1–2)	James Madison (3–1)	Northern Arizona (3–2)	Northern Arizona (4–2)	Tennessee State (7–1)	Lehigh (6–2)	Delaware (7–2)	Wofford (5–4)	Chattanooga (8–3)	Jacksonville State (9–3)	Furman (8–6)	21.
22.	Montana	Coastal Carolina (1–0)	Bethune-Cookman (2–0)	Northern Arizona (1–1) т	Northern Arizona (2–1)	Youngstown State (4–1)	New Hampshire (1–3)	Tennessee State (6–1)	New Hampshire (3–3)	Villanova (4–4)	Samford (6–3)	Delaware (7–3)	Southern Utah (8–3)	Harvard (9–1)	Charleston Southern (10–3)	22.
23.	Eastern Illinois	Bethune-Cookman (1–0)	Youngstown State (2–0)	Villanova (0–2) т	Stony Brook (1–2)	Maine (4–1)	Tennessee State (5–1)	New Hampshire (2–3)	Harvard (5–0)	James Madison (5–3)	Chattanooga (7–2)	Jacksonville State (8–2)	Samford (7–4)	Chattanooga (8–4)	Harvard (9–1)	23.
24.	Youngstown State	Northern Arizona (0–1)	Northern Arizona (0–1)	Illinois State (0–2)	Illinois State (1–2)	Gardner–Webb (4–1)	Jacksonville State (5–1)	Charleston Southern (7–0)	Charleston Southern (7–1) т	Tennessee State (7–2)	William & Mary (6–3) т	Princeton (7–1)	New Hampshire (6–4)	Lehigh (8–3)	Southern Utah (8–5)	24.
25.	Chattanooga	Youngstown State (1–0)	Eastern Kentucky (1–1)	Maine (3–0)	Youngstown State (3–1)	Delaware (4–1)	Charleston Southern (6–0)	Harvard (4–0)	South Dakota State (4–4) т	Southeastern Louisiana (6–2)	Central Arkansas (5–4) т	James Madison (6–4)	Tennessee State (9–3)	Southern Utah (8–4)	Chattanooga (8–4)	25.
	Preseason Aug 6	Week 1 Sep 2	Week 2 Sep 9	Week 3 Sep 16	Week 4 Sep 23	Week 5 Sep 30	Week 6 Oct 7	Week 7 Oct 14	Week 8 Oct 21	Week 9 Oct 28	Week 10 Nov 4	Week 11 Nov 11	Week 12 Nov 18	Week 13 Nov 25	Week 14 (Final) Jan 8	
		Dropped: 25. Chattanooga (0–1)	None	Dropped: 23. Youngstown State (2–1); 25. Eastern Kentucky (1–2)	Dropped: 25. Maine (3–1)	Dropped: 20. Richmond (2–3); 23. Stony Brook (1–3); 24. Illinois State (1–3)	Dropped: 19. Cal Poly (2–3); 24. Gardner–Webb (4–2); 25. Delaware (4–2)	Dropped: 24. Jacksonville State (5–2)	None	Dropped: 18. Northern Iowa (4–4); 23. Harvard (5–1)	Dropped: 17. New Hampshire (4–4); 22. Villanova (4–5); 24. Tennessee State (7–3)	Dropped: 22. Samford (6–4); 24. Central Arkansas (5–5)	Dropped: 21. Wofford (5–5); 22. Delaware (7–4); 23. Jacksonville State (8–3); 25. James Madison (6–5)	Dropped: 19. Princeton (8–2); 20. William & Mary (7–5)	Dropped: 24. Lehigh (8–3)	
