= Bob Ford Field at Tom & Mary Casey Stadium =

Stadium in Albany, NY, USA

Coordinates: 42°40′59.9″N 73°49′37.7″W

Bob Ford Field

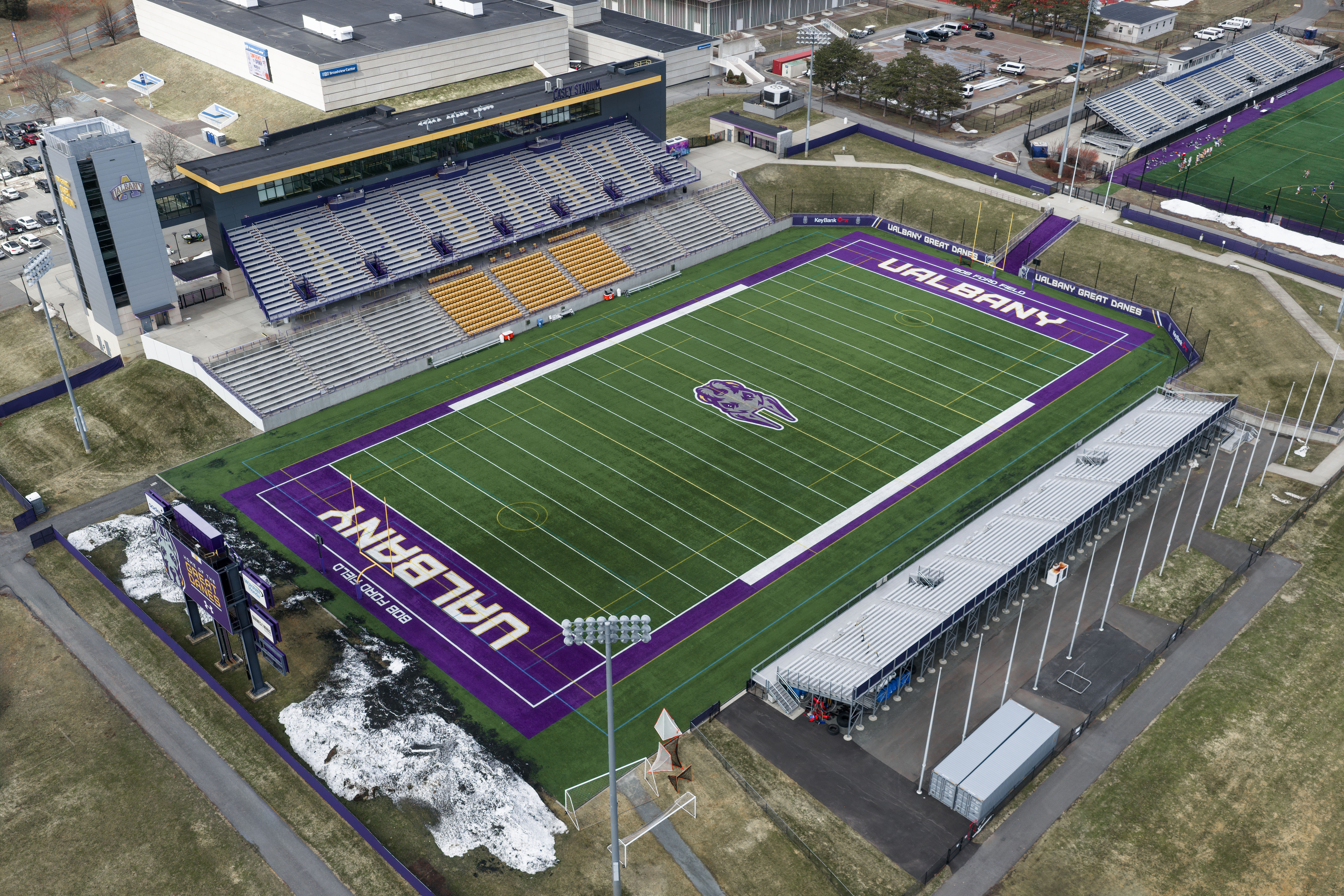
- Aerial view of the stadium in 2026
- Interactive map of Bob Ford Field
- Full name: Bob Ford Field at Tom & Mary Casey Stadium
- Former names: Bob Ford Field
- Address: Albany, NY; United States
- Owner: University at Albany, SUNY
- Operator: UAlbany Athletics
- Capacity: 8,500 (expandable to 24,000)
- Type: Stadium
- Surface: FieldTurf
- Current use: Football; Soccer; Field hockey

Construction
- Groundbreaking: April 17, 2012
- Opened: September 14, 2013
- Cost: $24 million
- Architect: Heery International Inc.
- Services engineer: Clough, Harbour & Associates
- General contractor: The Whiting-Turner Contracting Company

Tenants
- Albany Great Danes (NCAA) teams: football; men's and women's soccer; women's field hockey

Website
- ualbanysports.com/bob-ford-field

Bob Ford Field at Tom & Mary Casey Stadium is a stadium in Albany, New York, owned and operated by the University at Albany. The stadium serves as home venue to the school's football team, as well as their men's and women's soccer, and women's field hockey programs.

The stadium, with an initial seating capacity of 8,500 (originally called Bob Ford Field, named after Bob Ford, who was head coach at Albany from 1970 until retiring at the end of the 2013 season, with the playing field still called that) opened on September 14, 2013, when Albany made its debut in Colonial Athletic Association football against Rhode Island. It was renamed Bob Ford Field at Tom and Mary Casey Stadium in 2015 after Tom & Mary Casey gave a $10 million gift to the school. It replaced University Field as the school's current stadium.

== Features ==
- 8,500 seats, including 629 chair-backs, bleachers, and a natural grass berm.
- Daktronics scoreboard with a 39’ by 22’ HD video display and point-source sound system behind the south end zone.
- Press level with four luxury suites, print media area, and booths for radio, television, coaches, and replay.

== Attendance records ==
=== Football ===
Rank	Att.	Date	Result
1	9,052	October 8, 2016	16 Albany 30, 6 Richmond 36^{3OT}
2	8,919	October 21, 2017	Albany 10, Maine 12
3^{T}	8,500	August 26, 2023	Albany 34, Fordham 13
3^{T}	8,500	October 17, 2015	Albany 0, 25 Villanova 37
3^{T}	8,500	October 10, 2015	Albany 7, Maine 39
3^{T}	8,500	October 11, 2014	Albany 28, 22 Richmond 41
3^{T}	8,500	October 19, 2013	Albany 17, 7 Towson 44
3^{T}	8,500	September 14, 2013	Albany 13, Rhode Island 19^{OT}
3^{T}	8,500	October 3, 2026	Albany 28, Delaware State 3
10	8,212	October 15, 2022	Albany 37, Hampton 38^{OT}
11	8,144	September 11, 2021	Albany 14, Rhode Island 16
12	8,040	September 17, 2016	25 Albany 45, Holy Cross 28
13	8,019	September 28, 2024	21 Albany 20, Maine 34
14	7,763	October 19, 2019	Albany 35, Rhode Island 28
15	7,204	October 19, 2024	Albany 14, Elon 30
16	7,174	September 10, 2022	Albany 23, New Hampshire 28
17	7,071	September 30, 2023	Albany 31, 16 Villanova 10
18	7,029	October 20, 2018	Albany 28, 13 Towson 56
19	6,866	September 23, 2017	Albany 19, 7 Villanova 10^{OT}
20	6,748	August 30, 2014	Albany 14, Holy Cross 13

Due to growing popularity and national recognition of lacrosse, the first-ever Albany Great Danes men's lacrosse game was held at Bob Ford Field on April 18, 2015. It was the first time since March 10, 2007 that a top-10 matchup was held in the Capital District, with #4 UAlbany defeating #10 Delaware 13–7. Since then, multiple top-25 in the nation games have been held there. The official seating capacity for lacrosse at Casey Stadium is 6,394.

=== Lacrosse ===
Most home lacrosse games are played next door at John Fallon Field (Max-Capacity 2,500)

Rank.	Att.	Date	Result	Event
1	6,472	May 13, 2017	8 seed Albany 15, UNC 12	1st Round - NCAA Tournament
2	4,823	April 18, 2015	8 Albany 12, 7 Yale 11	Spring Stomp
3	4,800	May 2, 2018	2 seed Albany 15, Richmond 9	1st Round - NCAA Tournament
4	4,044	March 31, 2018	1 Albany 13, Stony Brook 7	
5	3,688	April 7, 2022	Albany 14, Syracuse 12	
6	3,553	April 20, 2018	2 Albany 18, Binghamton 7	
7	3,205	April 22, 2017	5 Albany 13, 12 Yale 12	Spring Stomp
8	3,093	April 12, 2017	6 Albany 11, 3 Maryland 12	
9	2,715	March 4, 2018	1 Albany 11, Cornell 9	
10	2,583	March 17, 2018	1 Albany 21, 14 Vermont 5	

== Non-UAlbany Events ==
Since 2021 Tom & Mary Casey Stadium has hosted the Premier Lacrosse League (PLL). In 2022 and 2023 the university has hosted the leagues training camp and opening weekend to the tour based schedule. In 2024 the league announced that teams would be given "home cities" and the New York Atlas (lacrosse) would be based out of Albany and Tom & Mary Casey Stadium. The addition of home cities and conferences brought slight changes to the schedule. Every team has one weekend where they are the home team and play a weekend doubleheader.

== See also ==
- List of NCAA Division I FCS football stadiums
