= Alfond Sports Stadium =

Football stadium in Orono, Maine

Harold Alfond Sports Stadium
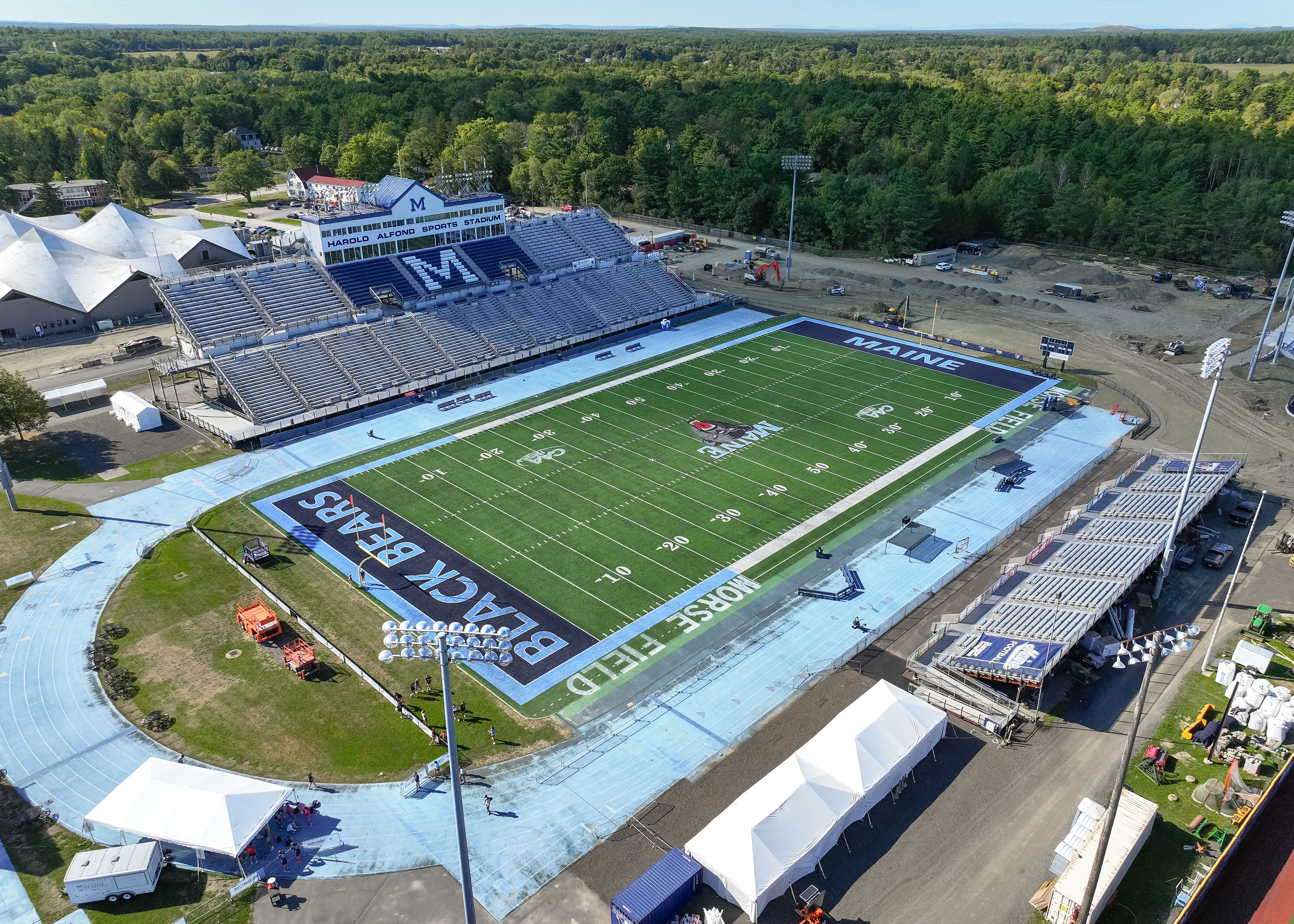
- Interactive map of Harold Alfond Sports Stadium
- Former names: Alumni Field (1947–1997)
- Location: Orono, Maine 04473
- Coordinates: 44°54′18″N 68°40′18″W
- Owner: University of Maine
- Operator: University of Maine
- Capacity: 10,000
- Surface: FieldTurf

Construction
- Opened: 1947
- Renovated: 1996–98
- Reopened: September 12, 1998
- Cost: $7.5 Million ($14.8 million in 2025 dollars)
- Architect: WBRC Architects

Tenant
- University of Maine Football (NCAA) (1946–present)

Harold Alfond Sports Stadium is a 10,000-seat multi-purpose stadium in Orono, Maine. The stadium hosts Morse Field, and the Beckett Family Track and Field Complex. It is the home of the University of Maine Black Bears football team.

== History ==
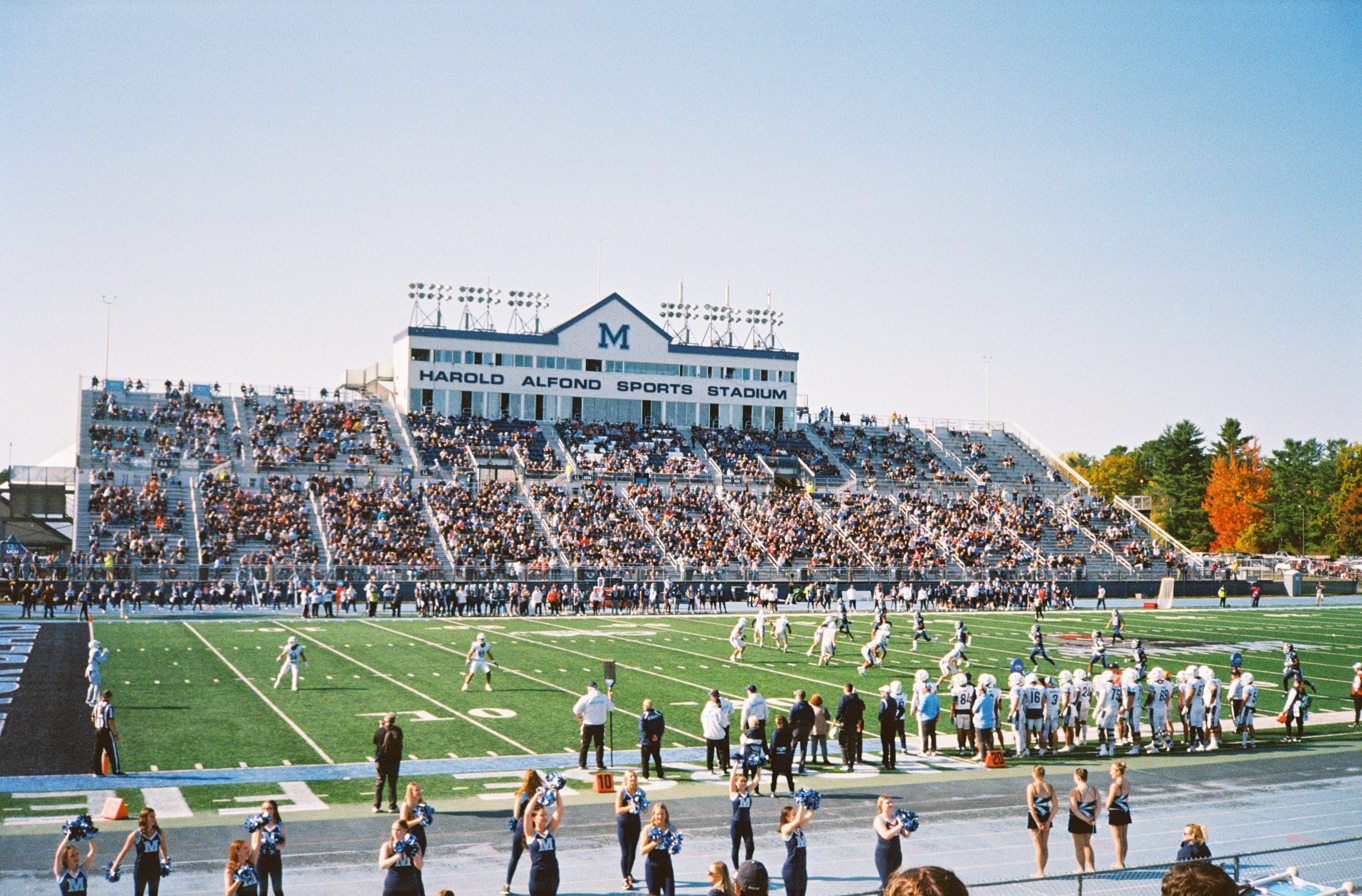
The stadium in 2024

The stadium opened as Alumni Field in 1947 and underwent extensive renovations from 1996 to 1998. The wood and steel grandstands, built in the 1940s, were condemned and demolished in 1996, replaced with the current east grandstand, along with a temporary structure on the west side, adjacent to Alfond Sports Arena. The current west grandstand, lights, press, and luxury levels, as well as concessions and restroom amenities, were completed prior to the 1998 season.

The stadium was rededicated to Harold Alfond, a longtime Maine booster, at Maine's first home night game on September 12, 1998, a 52-28 win over New Hampshire in the Battle for the Brice-Cowell Musket. The field is named for Phillip and Susan Morse, who donated the lights, original Astroturf and scoreboard. In the summer of 2008, new FieldTurf was installed to replace the old AstroTurf. In 2014, a 20-by-32-foot (6.1 m × 9.8 m) HD video-board replaced the matrix display installed in 1998, and a contemporary scoreboard was installed on the north end.

== See also ==
- List of NCAA Division I FCS football stadiums
