= Seth DeValve =

American football player (born 1993)

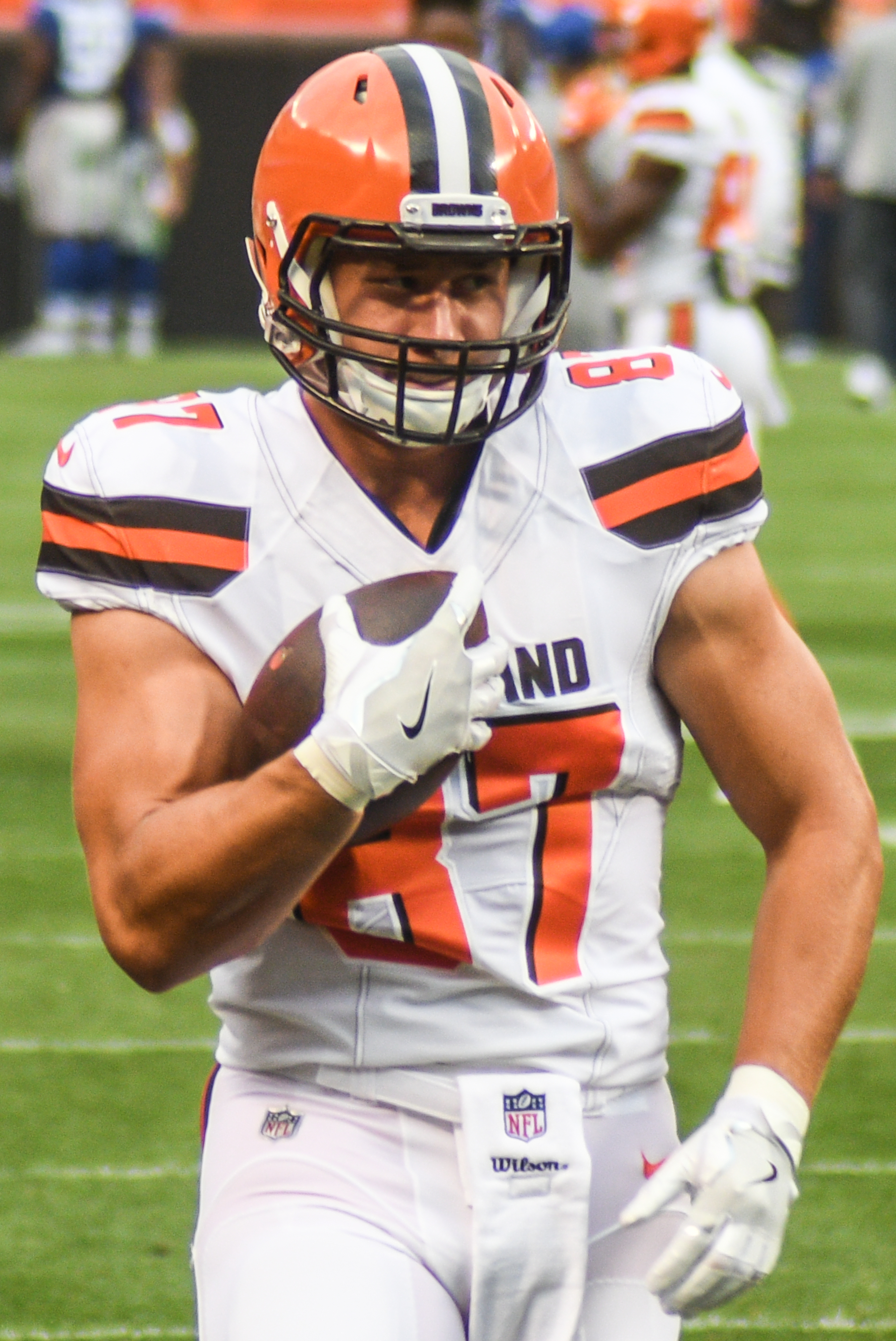
- DeValve with the Cleveland Browns in 2017

No. 87, 88, 86
- Position: Tight end

Personal information
- Born: January 29, 1993 (age 33); Manchester, Connecticut, U.S.
- Listed height: 6 ft 3 in (1.91 m)
- Listed weight: 245 lb (111 kg)

Career information
- High school: Manchester
- College: Princeton
- NFL draft: 2016: 4th round, 138th overall pick

Career history
- Cleveland Browns (2016–2018); Jacksonville Jaguars (2019); Carolina Panthers (2020)*; Arizona Cardinals (2020)
- * Offseason or practice squad member only

Career NFL statistics
- Receptions: 60
- Receiving yards: 736
- Receiving touchdowns: 4
- Stats at Pro Football Reference

Seth Nicolas DeValve (born January 29, 1993) is an American former professional football player who was a tight end in the National Football League (NFL). He was selected by the Cleveland Browns in the fourth round of the 2016 NFL draft. He played college football for the Princeton Tigers.

== Early life ==
DeValve was born on January 29, 1993, in Manchester, Connecticut, to Tim and Laurie DeValve. His father is an engineer and former long-distance runner at Connecticut. He has three older brothers: Caleb, Levi and Jacob. His brother Jacob ran the decathlon at Liberty University. DeValve started playing football in fourth grade. Through his elementary and middle school years, he played three sports — football in the fall, basketball in the winter, and track in the spring.

He went on to attend Manchester High School. While at Manchester, he played football as well as ran track & field. He was a two-time All-conference selection as a quarterback and an All-conference selection at free safety. In his career, he passed for 4,650 yards and 37 touchdowns. He rushed for nearly 2,000 yards and 24 touchdowns. On defense, he recorded nine interceptions. He was also a two-time captain of the football team and received the National Football Foundation and College Hall of Fame award.

While running track, DeValve was a state qualifier in the high jump and shot put and he competed in sprint and distance events. He was a National Guard Scholar-Athlete and Connecticut Interscholastic Athletic Conference (CIAC). As a junior, he was an All-state selection. As a senior he lettered and served as a team captain.

== College career ==
After graduation from Manchester High School, DeValve began attending Princeton University where he majored in mechanical engineering. As a freshman in 2011 he saw limited playing time as a wide receiver. He recorded one reception for 10-yards against Cornell. He also carried the ball three times and returned one punt. In 2012 he recorded 20 pass receptions for 219 yards while appearing in all 10 games. He recorded a 20-yard touchdown pass in a win over Harvard. The touchdown was the first in his career. He had a season-best four receptions against both Penn and Yale, as well as a season-high 70 yards against Yale.

In 2013 DeValve ranked in the Top 50 nationally in receptions (5.4), and the Top 100 in receiving yards (58.6). Both totals ranked among the Top 10 in the Ivy League. For the season, he recorded 49 receptions for 527 yards and four touchdowns. He caught touchdown passes in three straight wins, against Harvard, Cornell and Penn. He recorded career highs in both receptions (nine), and receiving yards (115), in the Tigers season finale against Dartmouth. He helped Princeton break Ivy League records in both scoring offense (43.7), and total offense (511.6). Princeton would go to win their 10th Ivy League championship in the school's history; their first since 2006. The Tigers would record five 50-point games during an eight-game win streak. The team had scored 50 points only four times in the previous 467 games. In 2014 he appeared in only two games due to injuries, those being open Epiphyseal plates in both his feet. He recorded nine receptions for 123 yards and a touchdown against San Diego, and 10 receptions for 120 yards against Brown. For the season, he averaged 121.5 yards per game and 12.8 yards per reception.

In 2015, DeValve, despite two injuries that cost him the better part of four games, still recorded 33 receptions for 337 yards and a touchdown. He suffered his first injury midway through week 2 against Lehigh. He missed the next three games and appeared in one series in week 6 against Harvard before another injury kept him out until week 8. In his final game as a Princeton Tiger, he recorded nine receptions for 110 yards against Dartmouth. For the season he recorded 33 receptions for 337 yards and one touchdown. At Princeton's 2015 banquet, he earned the Ronald A. Rogerson Award for Spirit and Inspiration.

DeValve finished his career ranked 10th all-time at Princeton in receptions (122) and 13th in receiving yards (1,336).

=== Statistics ===
Season				Receiving					Rushing					Fumbles	
Year	Team	GP	GS	Rec	Yards	Avg	TD	Long	Att	Yards	Avg	Long	TD	Fum	Lost
2011	Princeton	4	--	1	10	10.0	0	10	3	--	--	--	--	--	--
2012	Princeton	10	--	20	219	10.9	1	25	--	--	--	--	--	--	--
2013	Princeton	9	--	49	527	10.8	4	30	--	--	--	--	--	--	--
2014	Princeton	2	--	19	243	12.8	1	31	--	--	--	--	--	--	--
2015	Princeton	5	--	33	337	10.2	1	40	--	--	--	--	--	--	--
Career		30	--	122	1,336	11.0	7	31	3	--	--	--	--	--	--

== Professional career ==
Pre-draft measurables
Height	Weight	40-yard dash	10-yard split	20-yard split	20-yard shuttle	Three-cone drill	Vertical jump	Broad jump	Bench press
6 ft 2 3/8 in (1.89 m)	244 lb (111 kg)	4.68 s	1.54 s	2.75 s	4.18 s	6.96 s	40 in (1.02 m)	10 ft 5 in (3.18 m)	22 reps
All values from Princeton Pro Day

=== Cleveland Browns ===
DeValve was selected in the fourth round (138th overall) in the 2016 NFL draft by the Cleveland Browns. He is the highest-drafted Princeton football player in the modern-draft era. Although DeValve was listed as a wide receiver in college, the Browns list him as a tight end. On May 31, he signed a four-year contract, worth about $2.5 million, which included a signing bonus worth about $383,000. On July 25, he was placed on the active/physically unable to perform (PUP) list. He returned to active status on August 9. DeValve scored his first career touchdown on November 10 in a Thursday Night Football game against the Baltimore Ravens on a 25-yard pass from Cody Kessler.

DeValve was waived by the Browns on August 31, 2019.

=== Jacksonville Jaguars ===
On September 1, 2019, DeValve was claimed off waivers by the Jacksonville Jaguars.

=== Carolina Panthers ===
On March 26, 2020, DeValve was signed to the Carolina Panthers. He was released on June 3, with a non-football injury designation. DeValve was re-signed to Jacksonville's practice squad on November 4, and released on November 17.

=== Arizona Cardinals ===
On November 25, 2020, DeValve signed with the practice squad of the Arizona Cardinals. He was elevated to the active roster on December 5 and December 12 for the team's Weeks 13 and 14 games against the Los Angeles Rams and New York Giants, and reverted to the practice squad after each game. On December 25, DeValve was promoted to the active roster.

== Personal life ==
For one semester in college DeValve worked in risk management at NRG Energy. He is married to Erica Harris, whom he met while at Princeton University.

On August 21, 2017, DeValve became the first white NFL player to take a knee during the national anthem. The August 2017 demonstrations in Charlottesville, Virginia, had a lot to do with the decision, but DeValve said it was also more personal. His wife, Erica, is African-American. He said: "I myself will be raising children that don't look like me, and I want to do my part as well to do everything I can to raise them in a better environment than we have right now....So I wanted to take the opportunity with my teammates during the anthem to pray for our country and also to draw attention to the fact that we have work to do." Erica DeValve later stated that she did not want Seth viewed as a white savior.
