= 2013 Syracuse Orange football team =

American college football season

2013 Syracuse Orange football

Texas Bowl champion

Texas Bowl, W 21–17 vs. Minnesota
- Conference: Atlantic Coast Conference
- Atlantic Division
- Record: 7–6 (4–4 ACC)
- Head coach: Scott Shafer (1st season)
- Offensive coordinator: George McDonald (1st season)
- Offensive scheme: Pro-style
- Defensive coordinator: Chuck Bullough (1st season)
- Base defense: 4–3
- Home stadium: Carrier Dome

2013 Atlantic Coast Conference football standings
	Conf.			Overall
Team	W		L	W		L
Atlantic Division
No. 1 Florida State x$#	8	–	0	14	–	0
No. 8 Clemson %	7	–	1	11	–	2
Boston College	4	–	4	7	–	6
Syracuse	4	–	4	7	–	6
Maryland	3	–	5	7	–	6
Wake Forest	2	–	6	4	–	8
NC State	0	–	8	3	–	9
Coastal Division
No. 23 Duke x	6	–	2	10	–	4
Miami (FL)	5	–	3	9	–	4
Virginia Tech	5	–	3	8	–	5
Georgia Tech	5	–	3	7	–	6
North Carolina	4	–	4	7	–	6
Pittsburgh	3	–	5	7	–	6
Virginia	0	–	8	2	–	10
Championship: Florida State 45, Duke 7
# – BCS National Champion; $ – BCS representative as conference champion; % – BCS at-large representative; x – Division champion/co-champions; Rankings from AP Poll

The 2013 Syracuse Orange football team represented Syracuse University in the 2013 NCAA Division I FBS football season. The Orange were led by first year head coach Scott Shafer and played their home games at the Carrier Dome. The season marked their first as members of the Atlantic Coast Conference, after their final season in the Big East Conference in 2012. They finished the season 7–6, 4–4 in ACC play to finish in a tie for third place in the Atlantic Division. They were invited to the Texas Bowl where they defeated Minnesota.

== Previous season ==
The Orange's 2012 season was their last as members of the Big East Conference. They finished the year with an 8–5 record, and finished as conference co-champions, with a 5–2 record in Big East play. The Orange capped off their season with a win in the 2012 New Era Pinstripe Bowl over long-time rival West Virginia.

=== Preseason ===
After the conclusion of the season, head coach Doug Marrone was mentioned by several sportswriters as a possible candidate for a head coaching job in the National Football League. On January 6, 2013, Marrone was introduced as the head coach of the Buffalo Bills. Offensive coordinator Nathaniel Hackett departed for Buffalo as well, leaving a number of coaching positions open. On January 9, Syracuse announced the promotion of defensive coordinator Scott Shafer to head coach. Shortly thereafter, George McDonald was announced as the new offensive coordinator, and Chuck Bullough was announced as the new defensive coordinator.

== Personnel ==
=== Coaching staff ===
2012 Coaching staff
Head coach: Scott Shafer; Offensive coaches: Tim Lester – Quarterbacks; George McDonald – Offensive Coordinator; Rob Moore – Wide Receivers; Pat Perles – Offensive Line; DeAndre Smith – Running Backs; Defensive coaches: Chuck Bullough – Defensive Coordinator; Tim Daoust – Defensive Line; Donnie Henderson – Defensive Backs; Clark Lea – Linebackers; Support staff: Bob Brotzki – Assistant Athletics Director for Player Development; William Hicks – Assistant Athletics Director for Athletic Performance; Kevin Van Derzee – Director of Football Operations

== Schedule ==
Date	Time	Opponent	Site	TV	Result	Attendance
August 31	3:30 pm	vs. Penn State*	MetLife Stadium; East Rutherford, NJ (rivalry)	ABC/ESPN2	L 17–23	61,202
September 7	6:00 pm	at No. 20 Northwestern*	Ryan Field; Evanston, IL	BTN	L 27–48	38,033
September 14	4:00 pm	Wagner*	Carrier Dome; Syracuse, NY	ESPN3	W 54–0	33,299
September 21	12:30 pm	Tulane*	Carrier Dome; Syracuse, NY	ACCN	W 52–17	36,128
October 5	3:30 pm	No. 4 Clemson^{†}	Carrier Dome; Syracuse, NY	ABC/ESPN2	L 14–49	48,961
October 12	3:30 pm	at NC State	Carter–Finley Stadium; Raleigh, NC	ACCRSN	W 24–10	56,639
October 19	12:30 pm	at Georgia Tech	Bobby Dodd Stadium; Atlanta, GA	ACCN	L 0–56	45,704
November 2	12:30 pm	Wake Forest	Carrier Dome; Syracuse, NY	ACCRSN	W 13–0	38,550
November 9	3:30 pm	at Maryland	Byrd Stadium; College Park, MD	ACCRSN	W 20–3	37,213
November 16	3:30 pm	at No. 2 Florida State	Doak Campbell Stadium; Tallahassee, FL	ABC/ESPN2	L 3–59	74,491
November 23	12:30 pm	Pittsburgh	Carrier Dome; Syracuse, NY (rivalry)	ACCN	L 16–17	35,317
November 30	3:30 pm	Boston College	Carrier Dome; Syracuse, NY (rivalry)	ACCRSN	W 34–31	37,406
December 27	6:00 pm	vs. Minnesota*	Reliant Stadium; Houston, TX (Texas Bowl)	ESPN	W 21–17	32,327
*Non-conference game; ^{†}Homecoming; Rankings from Coaches' Poll released prior to the game; All times are in Eastern time

== Game summaries ==
=== Penn State ===
Syracuse vs. Penn State (New York's College Classic)

Team	1	2	3	4	Total
• Nittany Lions	0	6	7	10	23
Orange	0	3	7	7	17

- Date: August 31
- Location: MetLife Stadium
  East Rutherford, NJ
- Game start: 3:35 p.m. EDT
- Elapsed time: 3:34
- Game attendance: 61,202
- Game weather: Cloudy
- Referee: Mike Defee
- TV announcers (ABC/ESPN2): Mike Patrick, Ed Cunningham, Jeannine Edwards

Scoring summary
2	12:32	SU	Ross Krautman 32 yd field goal	SU 3–0
2	5:59	PSU	Sam Ficken 36 yd field goal	TIE 3–3
2	0:55	PSU	Sam Ficken 35 yd field goal	PSU 6–3
3	11:46	PSU	Allen Robinson 51 yd pass from Christian Hackenberg (Sam Ficken kick)	PSU 13–3
3	11:05	SU	Jerome Smith 10 yd run (Ross Krautman kick)	PSU 13–10
4	14:16	PSU	Sam Ficken 46 yd field goal	PSU 16–30
4	11:39	PSU	Geno Lewis 54 yd pass from Christian Hackenberg (Sam Fickmen kick)	PSU 23–10
4	6:58	SU	Jerome Smith 1 yd run (Ross Krautman kick)	PSU 23–17

Previous meeting	Previous winner
2009	Penn State, 28–7

Penn State Leads Series: 43–23–5

The Orange opened their season by traveling to MetLife Stadium in East Rutherford, NJ to renew their rivalry with the Penn State Nittany Lions. This was the 71st all-time meeting between the two schools.

Neither offense could get much going in the first half, and the score stood 6–3 in favor of Penn State at the break. The second half proved to be better for the Lions, as quarterback Christian Hackenberg lead the team to a 23–10 lead early in the 4th quarter. A Jerome Smith touchdown late in the game cut the deficit to 23–17, but the potential Orange comeback fell short when quarterback Drew Allen threw his second interception of the game late in the 4th.

=== Northwestern ===
Syracuse at Northwestern

Team	1	2	3	4	Total
Orange	0	7	6	14	27
• #20 Wildcats	10	24	0	14	48

- Date: September 7th
- Location: Ryan Field
  Evanston, IL
- Game start: 5:01 p.m. CDT
- Elapsed time: 3:25
- Game attendance: 38,033
- Game weather: 79 °F (26 °C); Wind: E 6 mph (9.7 km/h), Partly Cloudy
- Referee: Tom McCreesh
- TV announcers (Big Ten Network): Matt Devlin, Glen Mason, Lisa Byington

Scoring summary
1	14:09	NU	Treyvon Green 8 yd pass from Kain Colter (Jeff Budzien kick)	NU 7–0
1	3:15	NU	Jeff Budzien 32 yd field goal	NU 10–0
2	12:38	NU	Dan Vitale 20 yd pass from Trevor Siemian (Jeff Budzien kick)	NU 17–0
2	9:21	NU	Jeff Budzien 21 yd field goal	NU 20–0
2	6:29	SU	Jerome Smith 3 yd run (Ross Krautman kick)	NU 20–7
2	2:38	NU	Kain Colter 16 yd run (Jeff Budzien kick)	NU 27–7
2	0:02	NU	C. Jones 5 yd pass from Trevor Siemian (Jeff Budzien kick)	NU 34–7
3	12:32	SU	Kendall Moore 16 yd pass from Drew Allen (Ross Krautman kick failed)	NU 34–13
4	14:48	NU	Tony Jones 47 yd pass from Trevor Siemian (Jeff Budzien kick)	NU 41–13
4	10:22	SU	Prince-Tyson Gulley 9 yd run (Ross Krautman kick)	NU 41–20
4	5:18	NU	Treyvon Green 28 yd run (Jeff Budzien kick)	NU 48–20
4	2:49	SU	Terrel Hunt 15 yd run (Ryan Norton kick)	NU 48–27

Previous meeting	Previous winner
2012	Northwestern, 42–41

Series Tied: 5–5

For the second consecutive season, the Orange lost to the Northwestern Wildcats of the Big Ten Conference.

=== Wagner ===
Wagner at Syracuse

Team	1	2	3	4	Total
Seahawks	0	0	0	0	0
• Orange	9	28	17	0	54

- Date: September 14
- Location: Carrier Dome
  Syracuse, NY
- Game start: 4:00 p.m. EDT
- Elapsed time: 3:04
- Game attendance: 33,209
- Referee: David Epperley
- TV announcers (ESPN3): Shawn Kenney, John Bunting, Cat Whitehill

Scoring summary
1	12:17	SU	Ryan Norton 34 yd field goal	SU 3–0
1	2:23	SU	Jerome Smith 2 yd run (Ryan Norton kick failed)	SU 9–0
2	14:01	SU	Prince-Tyson Gulley 30 yd pass from Terrel Hunt (Ryan Norton kick)	SU 16–0
2	9:14	SU	Jerome Smith 8 yd run (Ryan Norton kick)	SU 23–0
2	5:34	SU	D. McFarlane 3 yd run (Ryan Norton kick)	SU 30–0
2	2:20	SU	Chris Clark 41 yd pass from Terrel Hunt (Ryan Norton kick)	SU 37–0
3	9:46	SU	Ryan Norton 32 yd field goal	SU 40–0
3	6:56	SU	Jarrod West 65 yd pass from Terrel Hunt (Ryan Norton kick)	SU 47–0
3	4:31	SU	Chris Clark 4 yd pass from Drew Allen (Ryan Norton kick)	SU 54–0

Syracuse Leads Series: 1–0

The Orange hosted Wagner in their home opener at the Carrier Dome in the first ever meeting between the two universities.

Syracuse's offense put on a dominating performance and rolled to a 54–0 win, their first of the season.

=== Tulane ===
Tulane at Syracuse

Team	1	2	3	4	Total
Green Wave	10	7	0	0	17
• Orange	21	21	7	3	52

- Date: September 21
- Location: Carrier Dome
  Syracuse, NY
- Game start: 12:30 p.m. EDT
- Elapsed time: 3:29
- Game attendance: 36,128
- Referee: Steve Barth
- TV announcers (ACCRSN): Wes Durham, Brian Stann, Jenn Hildreth

Scoring summary
{{{Time}}}	{{{Team}}}	{{{Event}}}	{{{Score}}}

Previous meeting	Previous winner
2011	Syracuse, 37–34

Syracuse Leads Series: 7–1

Tulane visits the Carrier Dome for the first time since the 1999 season. This is the second meeting in three years between the two teams.

=== Clemson ===
Clemson at Syracuse

Team	1	2	3	4	Total
• #3 Tigers	21	14	7	7	49
Orange	0	7	7	0	14

- Date: October 5
- Location: Carrier Dome
  Syracuse, NY
- Game start: 3:36 EST EDT
- Elapsed time: 3:24
- Game attendance: 48,961
- Referee: Pat Garvey
- TV announcers (ABC/ESPN2): Sean McDonough, Chris Spielman, Shannon Spake

Scoring summary
{{{Time}}}	{{{Team}}}	{{{Event}}}	{{{Score}}}

Previous meeting	Previous winner
1996	Syracuse, 41–0

Syracuse is Tied in Series: 1–1

The Orange's first conference game as members of the Atlantic Coast Conference was a matchup against the 3rd ranked Clemson Tigers. This was the second all-time meeting between Clemson and Syracuse, with the first ending in a 41–0 victory for the Orange in the 1996 Gator Bowl.

Clemson evened the overall series with a 49–14 victory behind a career night by Tajh Boyd who went 20 for 27 for 455 yards and 5 touchdowns.

=== NC State ===
Syracuse at NC State

Team	1	2	3	4	Total
• Orange	0	7	3	14	24
Wolfpack	0	7	0	3	10

- Date: October 12
- Location: Carter–Finley Stadium
  Raleigh, NC
- Game start: 3:30 p.m. EDT
- Elapsed time: 3:20
- Game attendance: 56,639
- Game weather: 69 °F (21 °C); Wind: NNW 6 mph (9.7 km/h), Overcast
- Referee: Ron Cherry
- TV announcers (ACCRSN): Wes Durham, Brian Stann, Jenn Hildreth

Scoring summary
2	11:11	SU	Jerome Smith 1 yd run (Ryan Norton kick)	SU 7–0
2	1:15	NCST	D. Grinnage 21 yd pass from P. Thomas (N. Sade kick)	TIE 7–7
3	4:13	SU	Ryan Norton 19 yd field goal	SU 10–7
4	10:12	NCST	N. Sade 27 yd field goal	TIE 10–10
4	6:13	SU	Prince-Tyson Gulley 18 yd run (Team kick failed)	SU 16–10
4	2:39	SU	Terrel Hunt 8 yd run (Ryan Norton rush)	SU 24–10

Previous meeting	Previous winner
1998	NC State, 38–17

NC State Leads Series: 6–1

Syracuse traveled to Raleigh, NC for a game against the NC State Wolfpack.

=== Georgia Tech ===
Syracuse at Georgia Tech

Team	1	2	3	4	Total
Orange	0	0	0	0	0
• Yellow Jackets	14	14	21	7	56

- Date: October 19
- Location: Bobby Dodd Stadium
  Atlanta, GA
- Game start: 12:30 p.m. EDT
- Elapsed time: 3:05
- Game attendance: 45,704
- Game weather: 65 °F (18 °C); Wind: SW 7 mph (11 km/h), Overcast
- Referee: J. Magallanes
- TV announcers (ACCN): Tim Brant, Dave Archer, Rachel Baribeau

Scoring summary
{{{Time}}}	{{{Team}}}	{{{Event}}}	{{{Score}}}

Previous meeting	Previous winner
2004	Georgia Tech, 51–14

Georgia Tech Leads Series: 2–0

Syracuse looked to avenge a 51–14 drubbing at the hands of Georgia Tech in their last meeting, which was the 2004 Champs Sports Bowl.

=== Wake Forest ===
Wake Forest at Syracuse

Team	1	2	3	4	Total
Demon Deacons	0	0	0	0	0
• Orange	0	0	13	0	13

- Date: November 2
- Location: Carrier Dome
  Syracuse, NY
- Game start: 12:30 p.m. EDT
- Elapsed time: 3:33
- Game attendance: 38,550
- Referee: Walt Davenport
- TV announcers (ACCRSN): Wes Durham, Brian Stann, Jenn Hildreth

Scoring summary
{{{Time}}}	{{{Team}}}	{{{Event}}}	{{{Score}}}

Previous meeting	Previous winner
2011	Syracuse, 36–29 ^{OT}

Series Tied: 1–1

The last meeting between the two schools occurred in the 2011 season, with the Orange winning in a thrilling overtime affair.

=== Maryland ===
Syracuse at Maryland

Team	1	2	3	4	Total
• Orange	7	3	3	7	20
Terrapins	0	0	3	0	3

- Date: November 9
- Location: Byrd Stadium
  College Park, MD
- Game start: 3:30 p.m. EST
- Elapsed time: 3:10
- Game attendance: 37,213
- Game weather: 57 °F (14 °C); Wind: SSW 11 mph (18 km/h), Clear
- Referee: Brad Allen
- TV announcers (ACCRSN): Wes Durham, Brian Stann, Jenn Hildreth

Scoring summary
{{{Time}}}	{{{Team}}}	{{{Event}}}	{{{Score}}}

Previous meeting	Previous winner
1994	Syracuse, 21–16

Syracuse Leads Series: 18–14–2

This was the only conference matchup between these two teams, as the Terrapins will be joining the Big Ten Conference for the 2014 season.

=== Florida State ===
Syracuse at Florida State

Team	1	2	3	4	Total
Orange	0	0	0	3	3
• Seminoles	28	10	21	0	59

- Date: November 16
- Location: Doak Campbell Stadium
  Tallahassee, FL
- Game start: 3:30 p.m. EST
- Elapsed time: 3:11
- Game attendance: 74,491
- Game weather: 74 °F (23 °C); Wind: SSE 5 mph (8.0 km/h), Mostly cloudy
- Referee: Jeff Flanigan
- TV announcers (ABC/ESPN2): Mike Patrick, Ed Cunningham, Jeannine Edwards

Scoring summary
{{{Time}}}	{{{Team}}}	{{{Event}}}	{{{Score}}}

Previous meeting	Previous winner
2005	Florida State, 38–14

Florida State Leads Series: 5–1

The Orange made their last road trip of the season to take on the Florida State Seminoles. This was their first game as conference opponents.

=== Pittsburgh ===
Pittsburgh at Syracuse

Team	1	2	3	4	Total
• Panthers	0	10	7	0	17
Orange	6	3	7	0	16

- Date: November 23
- Location: Carrier Dome
  Syracuse, NY
- Game start: 12:30 p.m. EST
- Elapsed time: 3:28
- Game attendance: 35,317
- Referee: Brad Allen
- TV announcers (ACCN): Tim Brant, Dave Archer, Rachel Baribeau

Scoring summary
{{{Time}}}	{{{Team}}}	{{{Event}}}	{{{Score}}}

Previous meeting	Previous winner
2012	Syracuse, 14–13

Pittsburgh Leads Series: 34–31–3

The Orange hosted familiar rival Pittsburgh in their first meeting as members of the Atlantic Coast Conference. This matchup was designated as a protected inter-division crossover game that will be played annually.

=== Boston College ===
Boston College at Syracuse (rivalry)

Team	1	2	3	4	Total
Eagles	7	7	7	10	31
• Orange	0	21	3	10	34

- Date: November 30
- Location: Carrier Dome
  Syracuse, NY
- Game start: 3:30 p.m. EST
- Elapsed time: 3:35
- Game attendance: 37,406
- Referee: David Epperley
- TV announcers (ACCRSN): Wes Durham, Brian Stann, Jenn Hildreth

Scoring summary
{{{Time}}}	{{{Team}}}	{{{Event}}}	{{{Score}}}

Previous meeting	Previous winner
2010	Boston College, 16–7

Syracuse Leads Series: 28–18

Formerly Big East Conference rivals, Syracuse and Boston College played their first game as conference opponents to close out the regular season. The 2013 edition was a must-win for the Orange in order to be bowl-eligible.
