= 2013 Lafayette Leopards football team =

American college football season

2013 Lafayette Leopards football

Patriot League champion

NCAA Division I First Round, L 7–45 at New Hampshire
- Conference: Patriot League
- Record: 5–7 (4–1 Patriot)
- Head coach: Frank Tavani (14th season)
- Offensive coordinator: Mickey Fein (5th season)
- Defensive coordinator: John Loose (14th season)
- Home stadium: Fisher Stadium

2013 Patriot League football standings
	Conf.			Overall
Team	W		L	W		L
Lafayette $^	4	–	1	5	–	7
Lehigh	3	–	2	8	–	3
Bucknell	3	–	2	6	–	5
Colgate	3	–	2	4	–	8
Holy Cross	1	–	4	3	–	9
Georgetown	1	–	4	2	–	9
No. 9 Fordham ^	0	–	0	12	–	2
$ – Conference champion; ^ – FCS playoff participant; Fordham was ineligible for conference title because they previously offered football scholarships while other Patriot League members did not.; Rankings from The Sports Network poll

The 2013 Lafayette Leopards football team represented Lafayette College as member of the Patriot League during the 2013 NCAA Division I FCS football season. Led by 14th-year head coach Frank Tavani, the Leopards compiled an overall record of 5–7 with a mark of 4–1 in conference play, winning the Patriot League title. Lafayette earned an automatic bid to the NCAA Division I Football Championship playoffs, where the Leopards lost in the first round to New Hampshire. Lafayette played home games at Fisher Field in Easton, Pennsylvania.

== Schedule ==
Date	Time	Opponent	Site	TV	Result	Attendance
September 7	6:00 pm	Sacred Heart*	Fisher Stadium; Easton, PA	LSN	L 24–26	6,238
September 14	6:00 pm	William & Mary*	Fisher Stadium; Easton, PA	LSN	L 6–34	6,348
September 21	6:00 pm	at Penn*	Franklin Field; Philadelphia, PA	LSN	L 21–27	8,103
October 5	3:30 pm	Bucknell^{†}	Fisher Stadium; Easton, PA	LSN	W 31–7	7,814
October 12	1:00 pm	at Princeton*	Powers Field at Princeton Stadium; Princeton, NJ	LSN	L 26–42	7,494
October 19	1:00 pm	at Harvard*	Harvard Stadium; Boston, MA	LSN	L 16–35	8,185
October 26	1:00 pm	at Holy Cross	Fitton Field; Worcester, MA	LSN	W 41–23	9,184
November 2	1:00 pm	at Georgetown	Multi-Sport Field; Washington, DC	LSN	W 45–27	1,789
November 9	3:30 pm	Colgate	Fisher Stadium; Easton, PA	LSN	L 24–28	8,763
November 16	3:30 pm	No. 5 Fordham	Fisher Stadium; Easton, PA	LSN	W 27–14	5,939
November 23	12:30 pm	at No. 17 Lehigh	Goodman Stadium; Bethlehem, PA (The Rivalry)	WFMZ	W 50–28	16,129
November 30	12:00 pm	at No. 15 New Hampshire*	Cowell Stadium; Durham, NH (NCAA Division I First Round)	ESPN3	L 7–45	3,286
*Non-conference game; ^{†}Homecoming; Rankings from The Sports Network Poll released prior to the game; All times are in Eastern time
