= 2013 Monmouth Hawks football team =

American college football season

2013 Monmouth Hawks football
- Conference: Independent
- Record: 6–6
- Head coach: Kevin Callahan (21st season)
- Offensive coordinator: Scott Van Zile (6th season)
- Offensive scheme: Multiple
- Defensive coordinator: Andy Bobik (20th season)
- Base defense: 4–3
- Home stadium: Kessler Field

2013 NCAA Division I FCS independents football standings
	Conf.			Overall
Team	W		L	W		L
Old Dominion		–		8	–	4
Abilene Christian		–		6	–	5
Incarnate Word		–		6	–	5
Monmouth		–		6	–	6
Charlotte		–		5	–	6
Houston Baptist		–		3	–	4
Abilene Christian and Incarnate Word ineligible for FCS playoffs as part of reclassification from Division II; Charlotte and Old Dominion ineligible for FCS playoffs as part of FBS transition; Houston Baptist ineligible for FCS playoffs due to playing only a partial exhibition schedule

The 2013 Monmouth Hawks football team represented Monmouth University in the 2013 NCAA Division I FCS football season. They were led by 21st-year head coach Kevin Callahan and played their home games at Kessler Field. After leaving in the Northeast Conference, they played 2013 as an FCS independent before joining the Big South Conference as a football only member in 2014.

== Schedule ==
Date	Time	Opponent	Site	TV	Result	Attendance	Source
August 29	9:00 p.m.	at No. 2 Montana State	Bobcat Stadium; Bozeman, MT		L 24–42	21,007	
September 7	7:00 p.m.	at Liberty	Williams Stadium; Lynchburg, VA		L 15–45	18,467	
September 14	1:00 p.m.	No. 22 Lehigh	Kessler Field; West Long Branch, NJ		L 25–28	3,813	
September 21	6:00 p.m.	at Holy Cross	Fitton Field; Worcester, MA		W 21–14	8,223	
September 28	12:30 p.m.	at Columbia	Robert K. Kraft Field at Lawrence A. Wien Stadium; Manhattan, NY		W 37–14	4,431	
October 5	1:00 p.m.	Robert Morris	Kessler Field; West Long Branch, NJ		W 35–9	3,210	
October 12	12:00 p.m.	at Saint Francis (PA)	DeGol Field; Loretto, PA	NECFR	L 10–28	1,016	
October 19	1:00 p.m.	Cornell	Kessler Field; West Long Branch, NJ		W 48–23	4,553	
November 2	1:00 p.m.	at Sacred Heart	Campus Field; Fairfield, CT		L 21–24	1,646	
November 9	12:00 p.m.	at Wagner	Wagner College Stadium; Staten Island, NY		W 23–6	2,167	
November 16	12:00 p.m.	at Bryant	Bulldog Stadium; Smithfield, RI		W 21–18	1,090	
November 23	12:00 p.m.	Duquesne	Kessler Field; West Long Branch, NJ		L 23–33	2,690	
Rankings from The Sports Network Poll released prior to the game; All times are in Eastern time
