= 2013 Colgate Raiders football team =

American college football season

2013 Colgate Raiders football
- Conference: Patriot League
- Record: 4–8 (3–2 Patriot)
- Head coach: Dick Biddle (18th season)
- Offensive coordinator: Dan Hunt (8th season)
- Co-defensive coordinators: Ryan Knowles (5th season); Paul Shaffner (1st season)
- Home stadium: Andy Kerr Stadium

2013 Patriot League football standings
| | Conf. | | | Overall |
| Team | W | | L | W | | L |
|---|---|---|---|---|---|---|
| Lafayette $^ | 4 | – | 1 | 5 | – | 7 |
| Lehigh | 3 | – | 2 | 8 | – | 3 |
| Bucknell | 3 | – | 2 | 6 | – | 5 |
| Colgate | 3 | – | 2 | 4 | – | 8 |
| Holy Cross | 1 | – | 4 | 3 | – | 9 |
| Georgetown | 1 | – | 4 | 2 | – | 9 |
| No. 9 Fordham ^ | 0 | – | 0 | 12 | – | 2 |
$ – Conference champion; ^ – FCS playoff participant; Fordham was ineligible for conference title because they previously offered football scholarships while other Patriot League members did not.; Rankings from The Sports Network poll

The 2013 Colgate Raiders football team represented Colgate University in the 2013 NCAA Division I FCS football season. They were led by 18th-year head coach Dick Biddle and played their home games at Andy Kerr Stadium. They were a member of the Patriot League. They finished the season 4–8, 3–2 in Patriot League play to finish in a two way tie for second place. Biddle retired at the end of the season.

== Schedule ==
| Date | Time | Opponent | Site | TV | Result | Attendance |
|---|---|---|---|---|---|---|
| August 31 | 3:00 pm | at Air Force* | Falcon Stadium; Colorado Springs, CO | RTRM | L 13–38 | 32,095 |
| September 7 | 6:00 pm | Albany* | Andy Kerr Stadium; Hamilton, NY | | L 34–37 | 5,217 |
| September 14 | 12:00 pm | at No. 12 New Hampshire* | Cowell Stadium; Durham, NH | | L 23–53 | 8,020 |
| September 21 | 1:00 pm | Yale*^{†} | Andy Kerr Stadium; Hamilton, NY | PLN | L 22–39 | 6,241 |
| October 5 | 12:30 pm | at Cornell* | Schoellkopf Field; Ithaca, NY (rivalry) | | W 41–20 | 4,973 |
| October 12 | 6:00 pm | Stony Brook* | Andy Kerr Stadium; Hamilton, NY | PLN | L 3–27 | 3,611 |
| October 19 | 12:00 pm | at Holy Cross | Fitton Field; Worcester, MA | CBSSN | W 28–24 | 6,882 |
| October 26 | 1:00 pm | at Georgetown | Multi-Sport Field; Washington, D.C. | | W 34–14 | 1,981 |
| November 2 | 1:00 pm | Bucknell | Andy Kerr Stadium; Hamilton, NY | PLN | L 7–28 | 4,379 |
| November 9 | 3:30 pm | at Lafayette | Fisher Stadium; Easton, PA | | W 28–24 | 8,763 |
| November 16 | 1:00 pm | No. 20 Lehigh | Andy Kerr Stadium; Hamilton, NY | PLN | L 14–31 | 5,190 |
| November 23 | 1:00 pm | No. 12 Fordham | Andy Kerr Stadium; Hamilton, NY | PLN | L 19–56 | 2,493 |
*Non-conference game; ^{†}Homecoming; Rankings from The Sports Network Poll released prior to the game; All times are in Eastern time
