= 2013 Robert Morris Colonials football team =

American college football season

2013 Robert Morris Colonials football
- Conference: Northeast Conference
- Record: 5–6 (3–3 NEC)
- Head coach: Joe Walton (20th season)
- Defensive coordinator: Scott Farison (6th season)
- Home stadium: Joe Walton Stadium

2013 Northeast Conference football standings
	Conf.			Overall
Team	W		L	W		L
Sacred Heart +^	4	–	2	10	–	3
Duquesne +	4	–	2	7	–	4
Robert Morris	3	–	3	5	–	6
Saint Francis (PA)	3	–	3	5	–	6
Bryant	3	–	3	5	–	7
Central Connecticut	2	–	4	4	–	8
Wagner	2	–	4	3	–	8
+ – Conference co-champions; ^ – FCS playoff participant

The 2013 Robert Morris Colonials football team represented Robert Morris University in the 2013 NCAA Division I FCS football season. They were led by 20th-year head coach Joe Walton and played their home games at Joe Walton Stadium. They were a member of the Northeast Conference. They finished the season 5–6, 3–3 in NEC play to finish in a three way tie for third place. Head coach Joe Walton retired at the end of the season.

== Schedule ==
Date	Time	Opponent	Site	TV	Result	Attendance	Source
August 29	7:00 p.m.	at Eastern Kentucky*	Roy Kidd Stadium; Richmond, KY		L 6–38	12,200	
September 7	12:00 p.m.	Morgan State*	Joe Walton Stadium; Moon Township, PA		W 31–14	1,485	
September 14	12:00 p.m.	Dayton*	Joe Walton Stadium; Moon Township, PA	NECFR	L 14–21	1,625	
September 28	1:30 p.m.	at VMI*	Alumni Memorial Field; Lexington, VA		W 37–31 ^{OT}	4,821	
October 5	1:00 p.m.	at Monmouth*	Kessler Field; West Long Branch, NJ		L 9–35	3,210	
October 19	6:00 p.m.	Duquesne	Joe Walton Stadium; Moon Township, PA	NECFR	L 20–21	2,893	
October 26	12:00 p.m.	at Wagner	Wagner College Stadium; Staten Island, NY	NECFR	W 17–13	2,115	
November 2	12:00 p.m.	Bryant	Joe Walton Stadium; Moon Township, PA	ESPN3	W 24–3	1,432	
November 9	12:00 p.m.	at Central Connecticut	Arute Field; New Britain, CT	NECFR	W 54–21	2,004	
November 16	12:00 p.m.	Sacred Heart	Joe Walton Stadium; Moon Township, PA	NECFR	L 25–42	1,214	
November 23	12:00 p.m.	at Saint Francis (PA)	DeGol Field; Loretto, PA	NECFR	L 3–23	1,211	
*Non-conference game; All times are in Eastern time
