= 2013 Sacred Heart Pioneers football team =

American college football season

2013 Sacred Heart Pioneers football

NEC co-champion

NCAA Division I First Round, L 27–37 at Fordham
- Conference: Northeast Conference
- Record: 10–3 (4–2 NEC)
- Head coach: Mark Nofri (2nd season)
- Offensive coordinator: Kevin Bolis (3rd season)
- Defensive coordinator: Dave Wissman (3rd season)
- Home stadium: Campus Field

2013 Northeast Conference football standings
	Conf.			Overall
Team	W		L	W		L
Sacred Heart +^	4	–	2	10	–	3
Duquesne +	4	–	2	7	–	4
Robert Morris	3	–	3	5	–	6
Saint Francis (PA)	3	–	3	5	–	6
Bryant	3	–	3	5	–	7
Central Connecticut	2	–	4	4	–	8
Wagner	2	–	4	3	–	8
+ – Conference co-champions; ^ – FCS playoff participant

The 2013 Sacred Heart Pioneers football team represented Sacred Heart University as a member of the Northeast Conference (NEC) during the 2013 NCAA Division I FCS football season. Led by second-year head coach Mark Nofri, the Pioneers compiled an overall record of 10–3 with a mark of 4–2 in conference play, sharing the NEC title with Duquesne. Due to a head-to-head win the Duquesne, Sacred Heart earned the conference's automatic bid to the NCAA Division I Football Championship playoffs. The Pioneers made the first playoff appearance in program history, losing in the first round to Fordham. The team played home games at Campus Field in Fairfield, Connecticut.

== Schedule ==
Date	Time	Opponent	Site	TV	Result	Attendance
August 31	6:00 p.m.	at Marist*	Tenney Stadium at Leonidoff Field; Poughkeepsie, NY		W 37–21	3,365
September 7	6:00 p.m.	at Lafayette*	Fisher Stadium; Easton, PA		W 26–24	6,238
September 14	6:00 p.m.	Lincoln (PA)*	Campus Field; Fairfield, CT		W 45–3	2,176
September 21	1:00 p.m.	Chowan*^{†}	Campus Field; Fairfield, CT	NECFR	W 78–35	2,884
September 28	6:00 p.m.	at Bucknell*	Christy Mathewson–Memorial Stadium; Lewisburg, PA		W 16–0	3,782
October 5	1:00 p.m.	Wagner	Campus Field; Fairfield, CT	NECFR	L 20–23	4,288
October 12	1:00 p.m.	Central Connecticut	Campus Field; Fairfield, CT	NECFR	W 59–36	1,190
October 19	1:00 p.m.	at Bryant	Bulldog Stadium; Smithfield, RI	NECFR	W 56–28	1,568
October 26	12:00 p.m.	at Saint Francis (PA)	DeGol Field; Loretto, PA	NECFR	L 10–24	1,723
November 2	1:00 p.m.	Monmouth*	Campus Field; Fairfield, CT	NECFR	W 24–21	1,646
November 9	12:00 p.m.	Duquesne	Campus Field; Fairfield, CT	ESPN3	W 10–0	1,466
November 16	12:00 p.m.	at Robert Morris	Joe Walton Stadium; Moon Township, PA	NECFR	W 42–25	1,133
November 30	1:00 p.m.	at No. 9 Fordham*	Coffey Field; Bronx, NY (NCAA Division I First Round)	ESPN3	L 27–37	4,787
*Non-conference game; ^{†}Homecoming; Rankings from The Sports Network Poll released prior to the game; All times are in Eastern time
