= 2013 Fordham Rams football team =

American college football season

2013 Fordham Rams football

NCAA Division I Second Round, L 28–48 at Towson
- Conference: Patriot League

Ranking
- Sports Network: No. 9
- FCS Coaches: No. 10
- Record: 12–2 (0–0 Patriot)
- Head coach: Joe Moorhead (2nd season)
- Offensive coordinator: Andrew Breiner (2nd season)
- Defensive coordinator: David Blackwell (2nd season)
- Home stadium: Coffey Field

2013 Patriot League football standings
| | Conf. | | | Overall |
| Team | W | | L | W | | L |
|---|---|---|---|---|---|---|
| Lafayette $^ | 4 | – | 1 | 5 | – | 7 |
| Lehigh | 3 | – | 2 | 8 | – | 3 |
| Bucknell | 3 | – | 2 | 6 | – | 5 |
| Colgate | 3 | – | 2 | 4 | – | 8 |
| Holy Cross | 1 | – | 4 | 3 | – | 9 |
| Georgetown | 1 | – | 4 | 2 | – | 9 |
| No. 9 Fordham ^ | 0 | – | 0 | 12 | – | 2 |
$ – Conference champion; ^ – FCS playoff participant; Fordham was ineligible for conference title because they previously offered football scholarships while other Patriot League members did not.; Rankings from The Sports Network poll

The 2013 Fordham Rams football team represented Fordham University as a member of the Patriot League during the 2013 NCAA Division I FCS football season. Led by second-year head coach Joe Moorhead, the Rams compiled an overall record of 12–2. Fordham was not eligible for the Patriot League championship because the program used scholarship players while the rest of the league's members did not. The team's official conference record was 0–0. Though ineligible for the conference title, Fordham finished the regular season at 11–1 and earned an at-large bid to the NCAA Division I Football Championship playoffs, where the Rams defeated Sacred Heart in the first round before losing to Towson in the second round. Fordham finished the season ranked ninth in the Sports Network Poll, the highest final ranking for the program at the NCAA Division I Football Championship Subdivision (FCS) level. The team played home games at Coffey Field in The Bronx.

== Schedule ==
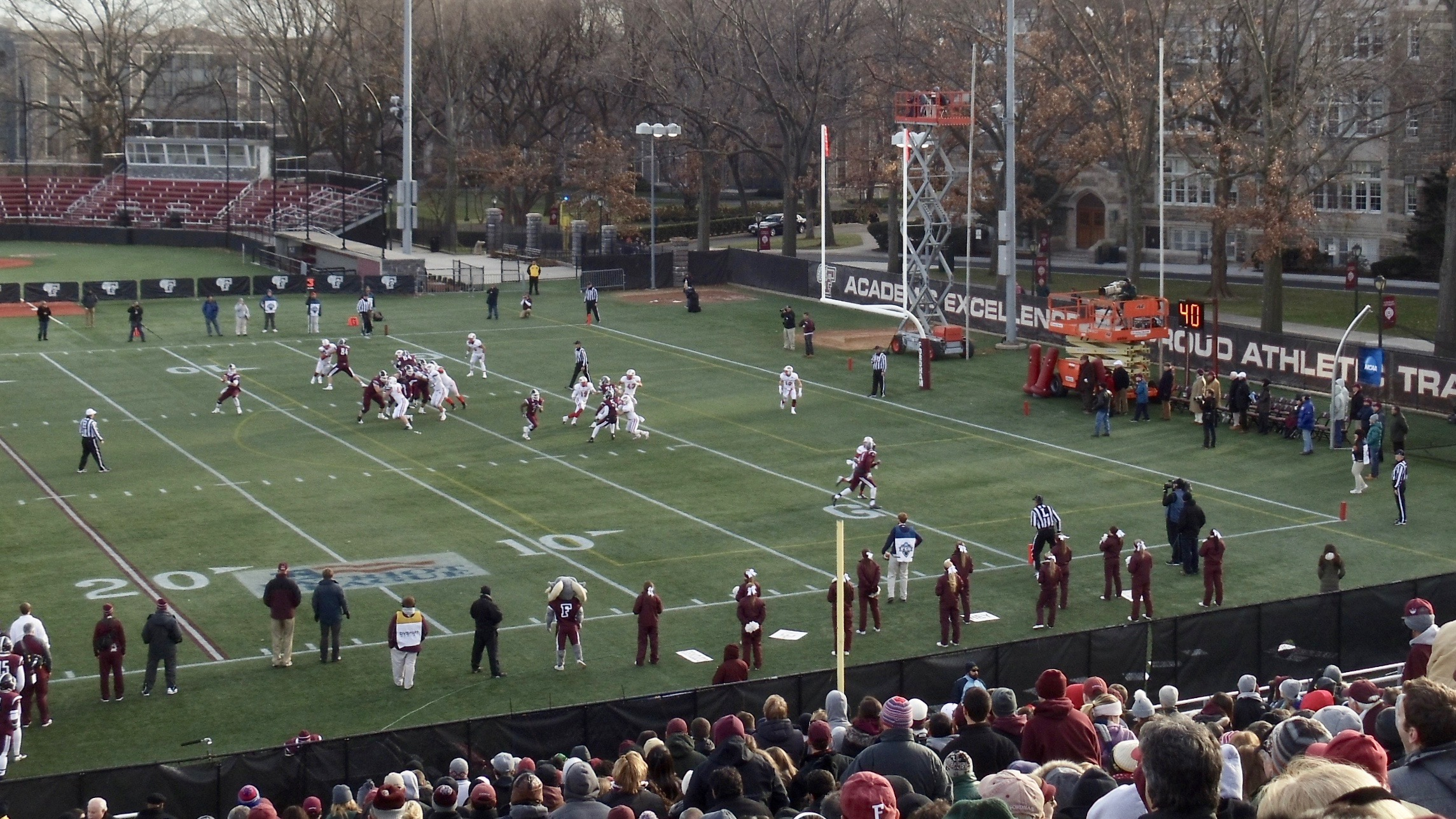
Fordham vs. Sacred Heart

| Date | Time | Opponent | Rank | Site | TV | Result | Attendance |
|---|---|---|---|---|---|---|---|
| August 29 | 7:00 pm | Rhode Island* | | Coffey Field; Bronx, NY | PLN | W 51–26 | 4,256 |
| September 7 | 6:00 pm | No. 8 Villanova* | | Coffey Field; Bronx, NY | PLN | W 27–24 | 5,178 |
| September 14 | 1:00 pm | at Temple* | | Lincoln Financial Field; Philadelphia, PA | TWCS | W 30–29 | 20,047 |
| September 21 | 1:00 pm | Columbia*^{†} | No. 21 | Coffey Field; Bronx, NY (Liberty Cup) | PLN | W 52–7 | 7,026 |
| September 28 | 12:00 pm | at Saint Francis (PA)* | No. 16 | DeGol Field; Loretto, PA | NECFR | W 38–20 | 1,831 |
| October 5 | 12:00 pm | No. 13 Lehigh | No. 12 | Coffey Field; Bronx, NY | CBSSN | W 52–34 | 7,751 |
| October 12 | 1:00 pm | at Georgetown | No. 10 | Multi-Sport Field; Washington, DC | | W 34–12 | 1,831 |
| October 19 | 12:00 pm | at Yale* | No. 8 | Yale Bowl; New Haven, CT | | W 52–31 | 13,691 |
| November 2 | 1:00 pm | Holy Cross | No. 8 | Coffey Field; Bronx, NY (Ram–Crusader Cup) | PLN | W 32–30 | 7,846 |
| November 9 | 1:00 pm | Bucknell | No. 7 | Coffey Field; Bronx, NY | PLN | W 23–21 | 6,826 |
| November 16 | 3:30 pm | at Lafayette | No. 5 | Fisher Stadium; Easton, PA | | L 14–27 | 5,939 |
| November 23 | 1:00 pm | at Colgate | No. 12 | Andy Kerr Stadium; Hamilton, NY | PLN | W 56–19 | 2,493 |
| November 30 | 1:00 pm | Sacred Heart* | No. 9 | Coffey Field; Bronx, NY (NCAA Division I First Round) | ESPN3 | W 37–27 | 4,787 |
| December 7 | 1:00 pm | at No. 5 Towson* | No. 9 | Johnny Unitas Stadium; Towson, MD (NCAA Division I Second Round) | ESPN3 | L 28–48 | 4,671 |
*Non-conference game; ^{†}Homecoming; Rankings from The Sports Network Poll released prior to the game; All times are in Eastern time

== Ranking movements ==
Ranking movements Legend: ██ Increase in ranking ██ Decrease in ranking — = Not ranked RV = Received votes т = Tied with team above or below
| | Week | | | | | | | | | | | | | | |
| Poll | Pre | 1 | 2 | 3 | 4 | 5 | 6 | 7 | 8 | 9 | 10 | 11 | 12 | 13 | Final |
|---|---|---|---|---|---|---|---|---|---|---|---|---|---|---|---|
| Sports Network | — | RV | RV | 21 | 16 | 12 | 10 | 8 | 8 | 8 | 7 | 5 | 12 | 9 | 9 |
| Coaches | — | RV | RV | 21 | 16 | 13 | 9 | 8 | 8–T | 8 | 6 | 5 | 11 | 10 | 10 |
