= 2013 Georgetown Hoyas football team =

American college football season

2013 Georgetown Hoyas football
- Conference: Patriot League
- Record: 2–9 (1–4 Patriot)
- Head coach: Kevin Kelly (8th season)
- Offensive coordinator: Vinny Marino (2nd season)
- Defensive coordinator: Rob Sgarlata (8th season)
- Home stadium: Multi-Sport Field

2013 Patriot League football standings
	Conf.			Overall
Team	W		L	W		L
Lafayette $^	4	–	1	5	–	7
Lehigh	3	–	2	8	–	3
Bucknell	3	–	2	6	–	5
Colgate	3	–	2	4	–	8
Holy Cross	1	–	4	3	–	9
Georgetown	1	–	4	2	–	9
No. 9 Fordham ^	0	–	0	12	–	2
$ – Conference champion; ^ – FCS playoff participant; Fordham was ineligible for conference title because they previously offered football scholarships while other Patriot League members did not.; Rankings from The Sports Network poll

The 2013 Georgetown Hoyas football team represented Georgetown University as a member of the Patriot League during the 2013 NCAA Division I FCS football season. Led by Kevin Kelly in his eighth and final season as head coach, the Hoyas compiled an overall record of 2–9 with a mark of 1–4 in conference play, tying for fifth place in the Patriot League. Georgetown played home games at Multi-Sport Field in Washington, D.C.

At the end of the season, Kelly resigned to become the defensive coordinator at Ball State.

== Schedule ==
Date	Time	Opponent	Site	TV	Result	Attendance
August 31	1:00 pm	at Wagner*	Wagner College Stadium; Staten Island, New York	NECFR	L 21–28	2,702
September 7	6:00 pm	Davidson*	Multi-Sport Field; Washington, DC		W 42–6	2,954
September 14	6:00 pm	Marist*	Multi-Sport Field; Washington, DC		L 23–43	1,813
September 21	12:30 pm	at Brown*	Brown Stadium; Providence, RI		L 7–45	3,093
September 28	2:00 pm	Princeton*^{†}	Multi-Sport Field; Washington, DC		L 22–50	2,981
October 12	1:00 pm	No. 10 Fordham	Multi-Sport Field; Washington, DC		L 12–34	1,831
October 19	12:30 pm	at No. 18 Lehigh	Goodman Stadium; Bethlehem, PA	PLN	L 24–45	9,866
October 26	1:00 pm	Colgate	Multi-Sport Field; Washington, DC		L 14–34	1,981
November 2	1:00 pm	Lafayette	Multi-Sport Field; Washington, DC		L 27–45	1,789
November 16	1:00 pm	at Bucknell	Christy Mathewson–Memorial Stadium; Lewisburg, PA	PLN	L 7–17	2,508
November 23	12:30 pm	at Holy Cross	Fitton Field; Worcester, MA	PLN	W 28–21	2,478
*Non-conference game; ^{†}Homecoming; Rankings from The Sports Network Poll released prior to the game; All times are in Eastern time
