= 2013 Saint Francis Red Flash football team =

American college football season

2013 Saint Francis Red Flash football
- Conference: Northeast Conference
- Record: 5–6 (3–3 NEC)
- Head coach: Chris Villarrial (4th season)
- Offensive coordinator: Eric Long
- Co-defensive coordinators: Scott Benzel; Jake Nulph
- Home stadium: DeGol Field

2013 Northeast Conference football standings
	Conf.			Overall
Team	W		L	W		L
Sacred Heart +^	4	–	2	10	–	3
Duquesne +	4	–	2	7	–	4
Robert Morris	3	–	3	5	–	6
Saint Francis (PA)	3	–	3	5	–	6
Bryant	3	–	3	5	–	7
Central Connecticut	2	–	4	4	–	8
Wagner	2	–	4	3	–	8
+ – Conference co-champions; ^ – FCS playoff participant

The 2013 Saint Francis Red Flash football team represented Saint Francis University in the 2013 NCAA Division I FCS football season. They were led by fourth year head coach Chris Villarrial and played their home games at DeGol Field. They were a member of the Northeast Conference. They finished the season 5–6, 3–3 in NEC play to finish in a three way tie for third place.

== Schedule ==
Date	Time	Opponent	Site	TV	Result	Attendance
September 7	6:00 p.m.	at No. 10 Georgia Southern*	Paulson Stadium; Statesboro, GA		L 17–59	13,758
September 14	6:00 p.m.	at No. 17 James Madison*	Bridgeforth Stadium; Harrisonburg, VA		L 20–24	21,276
September 21	2:00 p.m.	Lincoln (PA)*	DeGol Field; Loretto, PA	NECFR	W 38–7	1,226
September 28	12:00 p.m.	No. 16 Fordham*	DeGol Field; Loretto, PA	NECFR	L 20–38	1,831
October 5	1:00 p.m.	at Central Connecticut	Arute Field; New Britain, CT	ESPN3	L 29–38	4,119
October 12	12:00 p.m.	Monmouth*	DeGol Field; Loretto, PA	NECFR	W 28–10	1,016
October 26	12:00 p.m.	Sacred Heart^{†}	DeGol Field; Loretto, PA	NECFR	W 24–10	1,723
November 2	6:10 p.m.	at Duquesne	Arthur J. Rooney Athletic Field; Pittsburgh, PA		L 10–21	2,044
November 9	12:00 p.m.	at Bryant	Bulldog Stadium; Smithfield, RI	NECFR	W 23–20	773
November 16	12:00 p.m.	Wagner	DeGol Field; Loretto, PA	ESPN3	L 7–10	1,214
November 23	12:00 p.m.	Robert Morris	DeGol Field; Loretto, PA	NECFR	W 23–3	1,211
*Non-conference game; ^{†}Homecoming; Rankings from The Sports Network Poll released prior to the game; All times are in Eastern time
