= 2013 Duquesne Dukes football team =

American college football season

2013 Duquesne Dukes football

NEC co-champion
- Conference: Northeast Conference
- Record: 7–4 (4–2 NEC)
- Head coach: Jerry Schmitt (9th season)
- Offensive coordinator: Gary Dunn (5th season)
- Defensive coordinator: Dave Opfar (4th season)
- Home stadium: Arthur J. Rooney Field

2013 Northeast Conference football standings
	Conf.			Overall
Team	W		L	W		L
Sacred Heart +^	4	–	2	10	–	3
Duquesne +	4	–	2	7	–	4
Robert Morris	3	–	3	5	–	6
Saint Francis (PA)	3	–	3	5	–	6
Bryant	3	–	3	5	–	7
Central Connecticut	2	–	4	4	–	8
Wagner	2	–	4	3	–	8
+ – Conference co-champions; ^ – FCS playoff participant

The 2013 Duquesne Dukes football team represented Duquesne University in the 2013 NCAA Division I FCS football season. They were led by ninth year head coach Jerry Schmitt and played their home games at Arthur J. Rooney Athletic Field. They were a member of the Northeast Conference. They finished the season 7–4, 4–2 in NEC play to share the conference title with Sacred Heart. Due to their loss to Sacred Heart, they did not receive the conference's automatic playoff bid and did not receive an at-large bid.

== Schedule ==
Date	Time	Opponent	Site	TV	Result	Attendance
August 31	12:10 pm	Albany*	Arthur J. Rooney Athletic Field; Pittsburgh, PA		W 35–24	2,001
September 7	1:00 pm	at Dayton*	Welcome Stadium; Dayton, OH		L 20–23	3,478
September 21	4:00 pm	at Youngstown State*	Stambaugh Stadium; Youngstown, OH		L 17–59	16,958
October 5	12:10 pm	West Liberty*	Arthur J. Rooney Athletic Field; Pittsburgh, PA		W 27–14	1,816
October 12	1:10 pm	Wagner^{†}	Arthur J. Rooney Athletic Field; Pittsburgh, PA		W 34–7	2,781
October 19	6:00 pm	at Robert Morris	Joe Walton Stadium; Moon Township, PA	NECFR	W 21–20	2,893
October 26	1:00 pm	at Bryant	Bulldog Stadium; Smithfield, RI	NECFR	L 14–42	3,761
November 2	6:10 pm	Saint Francis (PA)	Arthur J. Rooney Athletic Field; Pittsburgh, PA		W 21–10	2,044
November 9	12:00 pm	at Sacred Heart	Campus Field; Fairfield, CT	ESPN3	L 0–10	1,466
November 16	12:10 pm	Central Connecticut	Arthur J. Rooney Athletic Field; Pittsburgh, PA		W 24–21	2,022
November 23	12:00 pm	at Monmouth*	Kessler Field; West Long Branch, NJ		W 33–23	2,690
*Non-conference game; ^{†}Homecoming; All times are in Eastern time
