= 2013 Columbia Lions football team =

American college football season

2013 Columbia Lions football
- Conference: Ivy League
- Record: 0–10 (0–7 Ivy)
- Head coach: Pete Mangurian (2nd season)
- Offensive coordinator: Jaime Elizondo (2nd season)
- Defensive coordinator: Chris Rippon (1st season)
- Home stadium: Robert K. Kraft Field at Lawrence A. Wien Stadium

2013 Ivy League football standings
	Conf.			Overall
Team	W		L	W		L
Harvard +	6	–	1	9	–	1
Princeton +	6	–	1	8	–	2
Dartmouth	5	–	2	6	–	4
Brown	3	–	4	6	–	4
Yale	3	–	4	5	–	5
Penn	3	–	4	4	–	6
Cornell	2	–	5	3	–	7
Columbia	0	–	7	0	–	10
+ – Conference co-champions

The 2013 Columbia Lions football team represented Columbia University in the 2013 NCAA Division I FCS football season. They were led by second year head coach Pete Mangurian and played their home games at Robert K. Kraft Field at Lawrence A. Wien Stadium. They were a member of the Ivy League. They finished with a record of 0–10 overall, 0–7 in Ivy League play for a last place finish. This was the sixth time in school history that the Columbia Lions went winless. Columbia averaged 5,610 fans per game.

== Schedule ==
Date	Time	Opponent	Site	TV	Result	Attendance
September 21	1:00 p.m.	at No. 21 Fordham*	Coffey Field; Bronx, NY (Liberty Cup)		L 7–52	7,026
September 28	12:30 p.m.	Monmouth*	Robert K. Kraft Field at Lawrence A. Wien Stadium; New York, NY		L 14–37	4,431
October 5	1:00 p.m.	at Princeton	Powers Field at Princeton Stadium; Princeton, NJ	ESPN3	L 7–53	5,689
October 12	12:00 p.m.	No. 17 Lehigh*	Robert K. Kraft Field at Lawrence A. Wien Stadium; New York, NY	NBCSN	L 10–24	3,890
October 19	1:30 p.m.	Penn	Robert K. Kraft Field at Lawrence A. Wien Stadium; New York, NY		L 7–21	10,820
October 26	1:30 p.m.	at Dartmouth	Memorial Stadium; Hanover, NH		L 0–56	3,142
November 2	12:00 p.m.	at Yale	Yale Bowl; New Haven, CT	YES	L 12–53	7,832
November 9	12:30 p.m.	Harvard	Robert K. Kraft Field at Lawrence A. Wien Stadium; New York, NY		L 0–34	4,622
November 16	12:30 p.m.	at Cornell	Schoellkopf Field; Ithaca, NY (rivalry)	FCS	L 9–24	3,073
November 23	12:30 p.m.	Brown	Robert K. Kraft Field at Lawrence A. Wien Stadium; New York, NY	FCS Atlantic	L 7–48	4,288
*Non-conference game; Rankings from The Sports Network Poll released prior to the game; All times are in Eastern time
