= Chuck Bullough =

American football player and coach (born 1968)

LSU Tigers football
- Title: Senior defensive analyst

Personal information
- Born: March 3, 1969 (age 57); East Lansing, Michigan, U.S.
- Listed height: 6 ft 1 in (1.85 m)
- Listed weight: 238 lb (108 kg)

Career information
- Position: Linebacker (No. 54)
- High school: Orchard Park (Orchard Park, New York)
- College: Michigan State
- NFL draft: 1992: 8th round, 214th overall pick

Career history

Playing
- Philadelphia Eagles (1992)*; Miami Dolphins (1993–1994); Indianapolis Colts (1996)*
- * Offseason or practice squad member only

Coaching
- Michigan State (1997) Defensive backs; Michigan State (1998) Offensive line; Chicago Bears (1999–2001) Linebackers; Chicago Bears (2002) Defensive line; Chicago Bears (2003) Defensive backs; Lake Forest (2004) Linebackers / Special teams; Western Michigan (2005) Linebackers; UCLA (2006–2008) Linebackers; UCLA (2009–2010) Defensive coordinator / Linebackers; Cleveland Browns (2011–2012) Linebackers; Syracuse (2013–2015) Defensive coordinator; Eastern Michigan (2016–2018) Defensive line; Michigan State (2019) Defensive Ends; LSU (2022-present) Senior defensive analyst

Awards and highlights
- First-team All-Big Ten (1991); Second-team All-Big Ten (1990)

Career NFL statistics
- Tackles: 4
- Stats at Pro Football Reference

Chuck Bullough (born March 3, 1969) is an American football coach and is currently a senior defensive analyst at LSU. He was previously the defensive ends coach at Michigan State University. He formerly coached at Eastern Michigan. He is also a former defensive coordinator with the Syracuse Orange of the Atlantic Coast Conference before being let go along with the rest of Scott Shafer's staff. He previously served as the defensive coordinator and linebackers coach for the UCLA Bruins under head coach Rick Neuheisel. Promoted from linebackers coach in January 2009, Bullough succeeded DeWayne Walker, who was hired as the head coach of the New Mexico State Aggies.

== Playing career ==
Born in East Lansing, Michigan, Bullough went on to hometown Michigan State University, where he played linebacker for the Spartans football team. He played for three bowl teams, including the 1988 Rose Bowl squad, and the Spartans won two Big Ten Conference titles during his career. He was selected to the All-Big Ten second-team in 1990, and the All-Big Ten first-team in 1991, along with being named a second-team All-American. Bullough set a Spartans single-season record with 175 tackles.

Bullough was selected in the eighth round of the 1992 NFL draft by the Philadelphia Eagles and had a five-year career in the National Football League, playing for the Miami Dolphins (1993–95) and attended camps with the Eagles (1992) and Indianapolis Colts (1996).

Bullough played his high school football at Orchard Park High School where he was an All-State Linebacker. His father is former Buffalo Bills head coach Hank Bullough

== Coaching career ==
Bullough was named a defensive assistant coach for the Cleveland Browns on February 14, 2011.
