= 2013 Brown Bears football team =

American college football season

2013 Brown Bears football
- Conference: Ivy League
- Record: 6–4 (3–4 Ivy)
- Head coach: Phil Estes (16th season)
- Offensive coordinator: Frank Sheehan (8th season)
- Offensive scheme: Pro-style
- Defensive coordinator: Michael Kelleher (13th season)
- Base defense: 4–3
- Home stadium: Brown Stadium

2013 Ivy League football standings
	Conf.			Overall
Team	W		L	W		L
Harvard +	6	–	1	9	–	1
Princeton +	6	–	1	8	–	2
Dartmouth	5	–	2	6	–	4
Brown	3	–	4	6	–	4
Yale	3	–	4	5	–	5
Penn	3	–	4	4	–	6
Cornell	2	–	5	3	–	7
Columbia	0	–	7	0	–	10
+ – Conference co-champions

The 2013 Brown Bears football team represented Brown University in the 2013 NCAA Division I FCS football season. They were led by 16th year head coach Phil Estes and played their home games at Brown Stadium. They were a member of the Ivy League. They finished with a record of 6–4 overall, and 3–4 in Ivy League play for a 3 way tie finish for 4th. Brown averaged 5,098 fans per game.

== Schedule ==
Date	Time	Opponent	Site	TV	Result	Attendance
September 21	12:30 p.m.	Georgetown*	Brown Stadium; Providence, RI		W 45–7	3,093
September 28	7:30 p.m.	at Harvard	Harvard Stadium; Boston, MA	NBCSN	L 23–41	17,256
October 5	6:00 p.m.	Rhode Island*	Brown Stadium; Providence, RI (rivalry)		W 31–14	6,512
October 12	1:00 p.m.	at Bryant*	Bulldog Stadium; Smithfield, RI	NECFR	W 41–14	4,288
October 19	6:00 p.m.	Princeton	Brown Stadium; Providence, RI	FCS Pacific	L 17–39	8,062
October 26	12:30 p.m.	at Cornell	Schoellkopf Field; Ithaca, NY		W 42–35	3,195
November 2	12:30 p.m.	Penn^{†}	Brown Stadium; Providence, RI	FCS Central	W 27–0	4,590
November 9	12:00 p.m.	at Yale	Yale Bowl; New Haven, CT		L 17–24	7,988
November 16	12:30 p.m.	Dartmouth	Brown Stadium; Providence, RI		L 20–24	3,234
November 23	12:30 p.m.	at Columbia	Robert K. Kraft Field at Lawrence A. Wien Stadium; New York, NY	FCS Atlantic	W 48–7	4,288
*Non-conference game; ^{†}Homecoming; All times are in Eastern time
