= 2013 Bucknell Bison football team =

American college football season

2013 Bucknell Bison football
- Conference: Patriot League
- Record: 6–5 (3–2 Patriot)
- Head coach: Joe Susan (4th season)
- Offensive coordinator: Bryan Bossard (4th season)
- Home stadium: Christy Mathewson–Memorial Stadium

2013 Patriot League football standings
	Conf.			Overall
Team	W		L	W		L
Lafayette $^	4	–	1	5	–	7
Lehigh	3	–	2	8	–	3
Bucknell	3	–	2	6	–	5
Colgate	3	–	2	4	–	8
Holy Cross	1	–	4	3	–	9
Georgetown	1	–	4	2	–	9
No. 9 Fordham ^	0	–	0	12	–	2
$ – Conference champion; ^ – FCS playoff participant; Fordham was ineligible for conference title because they previously offered football scholarships while other Patriot League members did not.; Rankings from The Sports Network poll

The 2013 Bucknell Bison football team represented Bucknell University as a member of the Patriot League during the 2013 NCAA Division I FCS football season. Led by fourth-year head coach Joe Susan, the Bison compiled an overall record of 6–5 with a mark of 3–2 in conference play, placing in a three-way tie for second in the Patriot League. Bucknell played home games at Christy Mathewson–Memorial Stadium in Lewisburg, Pennsylvania.

== Schedule ==
Date	Time	Opponent	Site	TV	Result	Attendance
September 7	6:00 pm	Marist*	Christy Mathewson–Memorial Stadium; Lewisburg, PA	PLN	W 27–14	4,509
September 21	3:00 pm	at Cornell*	Schoellkopf Field; Ithaca, NY		L 13–45	15,442
September 28	6:00 pm	Sacred Heart*	Christy Mathewson-Memorial Stadium; Lewisburg, PA	PLN	L 0–16	3,782
October 5	3:30 pm	at Lafayette	Fisher Stadium; Easton, PA		L 7–31	7,814
October 12	1:00 pm	Holy Cross	Christy Mathewson-Memorial Stadium; Lewisburg, PA	PLN	L 27–51	2,815
October 19	1:30 pm	at Dartmouth*	Memorial Stadium; Hanover, NH		W 17–14	3,629
October 26	1:00 pm	No. 15 Lehigh^{†}	Christy Mathewson-Memorial Stadium; Lewisburg, PA	PLN	W 48–10	4,018
November 2	1:00 pm	at Colgate	Andy Kerr Stadium; Hamilton, NY	PLN	W 28–7	4,379
November 9	1:00 pm	at No. 7 Fordham	Coffey Field; Bronx, NY	PLN	L 21–23	6,826
November 16	1:00 pm	Georgetown	Christy Mathewson-Memorial Stadium; Lewisburg, PA	PLN	W 17–7	2,508
November 23	1:30 pm	at VMI*	Alumni Memorial Field; Lexington, VA		W 35–23	4,913
*Non-conference game; ^{†}Homecoming; Rankings from The Sports Network Poll released prior to the game; All times are in Eastern time
