= 2013 Lehigh Mountain Hawks football team =

American college football season

2013 Lehigh Mountain Hawks football
- Conference: Patriot League
- Record: 8–3 (3–2 Patriot)
- Head coach: Andy Coen (8th season)
- Offensive coordinator: Dave Cecchini
- Co-defensive coordinators: Donnie Roberts; Gerard Wilcher (2nd season)
- Home stadium: Goodman Stadium

2013 Patriot League football standings
	Conf.			Overall
Team	W		L	W		L
Lafayette $^	4	–	1	5	–	7
Lehigh	3	–	2	8	–	3
Bucknell	3	–	2	6	–	5
Colgate	3	–	2	4	–	8
Holy Cross	1	–	4	3	–	9
Georgetown	1	–	4	2	–	9
No. 9 Fordham ^	0	–	0	12	–	2
$ – Conference champion; ^ – FCS playoff participant; Fordham was ineligible for conference title because they previously offered football scholarships while other Patriot League members did not.; Rankings from The Sports Network poll

The 2013 Lehigh Mountain Hawks football team represented Lehigh University in the 2013 NCAA Division I FCS football season. They were led by eighth-year head coach Andy Coen and played their home games at Goodman Stadium. They were a member of the Patriot League. They finished the season 8–3, 3–2 in Patriot League play to finish in a three-way tie for second place.

== Schedule ==
Date	Time	Opponent	Rank	Site	TV	Result	Attendance
September 7	12:30 pm	Central Connecticut*	No. 23	Goodman Stadium; Bethlehem, PA	SE2	W 51–44 ^{2OT}	6,386
September 14	1:00 pm	at Monmouth*	No. 22	Kessler Field; West Long Branch, NJ		W 28–25	3,813
September 21	6:00 pm	at Princeton*	No. 22	Powers Field at Princeton Stadium; Princeton, NJ	NBCSN	W 29–28	6,982
September 28	12:30 pm	No. 10 New Hampshire*^{†}	No. 21	Goodman Stadium; Bethlehem, PA	SE2	W 34–27	8,998
October 5	12:00 pm	at No. 12 Fordham*	No. 13	Coffey Field; Bronx, NY	CBSSN	L 34–52	7,751
October 12	12:00 pm	at Columbia*	No. 17	Robert K. Kraft Field at Lawrence A. Wien Stadium; Manhattan, NY	NBCSN	W 24–10	3,890
October 19	12:30 pm	Georgetown	No. 18	Goodman Stadium; Bethlehem, PA	SE2	W 45–24	9,866
October 26	1:00 pm	at Bucknell	No. 15	Christy Mathewson–Memorial Stadium; Lewisburg, PA	PLN	L 10–48	4,018
November 9	12:30 pm	Holy Cross	No. 21	Goodman Stadium; Bethlehem, PA	SE2	W 34–20	6,745
November 16	12:30 pm	at Colgate	No. 20	Andy Kerr Stadium; Hamilton, NY	PLN	W 31–14	5,190
November 23	12:30 pm	Lafayette	No. 17	Goodman Stadium; Bethlehem, PA (149th meeting of The Rivalry)	WFMZ	L 28–50	16,129
*Non-conference game; ^{†}Homecoming; Rankings from The Sports Network Poll released prior to the game; All times are in Eastern time

- Source: Schedule

== Ranking movements ==
Ranking movements Legend: ██ Increase in ranking ██ Decrease in ranking RV = Received votes
	Week														
Poll	Pre	1	2	3	4	5	6	7	8	9	10	11	12	13	Final
Sports Network	22	23	22	22	21	13	17	18	15	22	21	20	17	24	RV
Coaches	17	19	19	18	17	10	14	16	15	21	19	17	15	24	RV
