= 2013 Wagner Seahawks football team =

American college football season

2013 Wagner Seahawks football
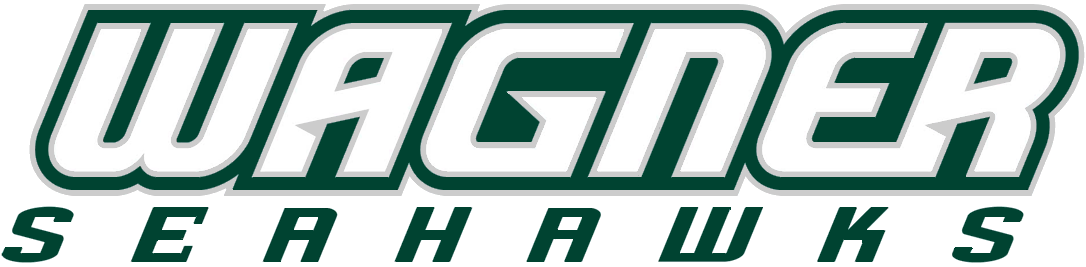
- Conference: Northeast Conference
- Record: 3–8 (2–4 NEC)
- Head coach: Walt Hameline (33rd season)
- Defensive coordinator: Malik Hall (2nd season)
- Home stadium: Wagner College Stadium

2013 Northeast Conference football standings
	Conf.			Overall
Team	W		L	W		L
Sacred Heart +^	4	–	2	10	–	3
Duquesne +	4	–	2	7	–	4
Robert Morris	3	–	3	5	–	6
Saint Francis (PA)	3	–	3	5	–	6
Bryant	3	–	3	5	–	7
Central Connecticut	2	–	4	4	–	8
Wagner	2	–	4	3	–	8
+ – Conference co-champions; ^ – FCS playoff participant

The 2013 Wagner Seahawks football team represented Wagner College in the 2013 NCAA Division I FCS football season as a member of the Northeast Conference (NEC). They were led by 33rd-year head coach Walt Hameline and played their home games at Wagner College Stadium. Wagner the season 3–8 overall and 2–4 in NEC play to tie for sixth place.

== Schedule ==
Date	Time	Opponent	Site	TV	Result	Attendance
August 31	1:00 p.m.	Georgetown*	Wagner College Stadium; Staten Island, NY	NECFR	W 28–21	2,702
September 6	6:00 p.m.	Merrimack*	Wagner College Stadium; Staten Island, NY	NECFR	L 41–42	2,634
September 14	4:00 p.m.	at Syracuse*	Carrier Dome; Syracuse, NY	ESPN3	L 0–54	38,033
September 21	6:00 p.m.	at Delaware*	Delaware Stadium; Newark, DE		L 9–49	15,723
September 28	1:00 p.m.	Bryant^{†}	Wagner College Stadium; Staten Island, NY	ESPN3	L 28–47	2,493
October 5	1:00 p.m.	at Sacred Heart	Campus Field; Fairfield, CT	NECFR	W 23–20	4,288
October 12	1:00 p.m.	at Duquesne	Arthur J. Rooney Athletic Field; Pittsburgh, PA		L 7–34	2,781
October 26	1:00 p.m.	Robert Morris	Wagner College Stadium; Staten Island, NY	NECFR	L 13–17	2,115
November 2	1:00 p.m.	Central Connecticut	Wagner College Stadium; Staten Island, NY	NECFR	L 17–52	1,656
November 9	1:00 p.m.	Monmouth*	Wagner College Stadium; Staten Island, NY	NECFR	L 6–23	2,167
November 16	1:00 p.m.	at Saint Francis (PA)	DeGol Field; Loretto, PA	ESPN3	W 10–7	1,214
*Non-conference game; ^{†}Homecoming; All times are in Eastern time
