= 2013 Texas Bowl =

Syracuse Orange	Minnesota Golden Gophers
(6–6)	(8–4)
ACC	Big Ten
21	17
Head coach: Scott Shafer	Head coach: Jerry Kill
	1	2	3	4	Total
Syracuse	0	7	7	7	21
Minnesota	0	3	0	14	17
- Date: December 27, 2013
- Season: 2013
- Stadium: Reliant Stadium
- Location: Houston, Texas
- MVP: Terrel Hunt (QB), Syracuse
- Favorite: Minnesota by 4½
- Referee: Matt Moore (SEC)
- Attendance: 32,327
- Payout: US$1,700,000

United States TV coverage
- Network: ESPN
- Announcers: Mark Jones (play-by-play); Brock Huard (analyst); Kaylee Hartung (sidelines)

The 2013 Texas Bowl is an American college football bowl game that was played on December 27, 2013 at Reliant Stadium in Houston, Texas. It was one of the 2013–14 bowl games that concluded the 2013 FBS football season. The eighth edition of the Texas Bowl, it featured the Minnesota Golden Gophers of the Big Ten Conference against the Syracuse Orange of the Atlantic Coast Conference. The game began at 5:00 p.m. CST and aired on ESPN.

Syracuse defeated Minnesota, 21–17. Syracuse quarterback Terrel Hunt, who completed 19 of his 29 passes for 188 yards and rushed for 2 touchdowns, was named the game's most valuable player.

== Teams ==
The Golden Gophers finished the regular season with a record of 8–4 (4–4 Big Ten). The Orange were 6–6 (4–4 ACC). Syracuse accepted their bid as an at large team after the Big 12 Conference was unable to fulfill their obligation. This was the second consecutive (and overall) Texas Bowl for Minnesota, and first for Syracuse. It was the fifth meeting between the two schools; Minnesota now leads the series 3–2.

== Pregame buildup ==
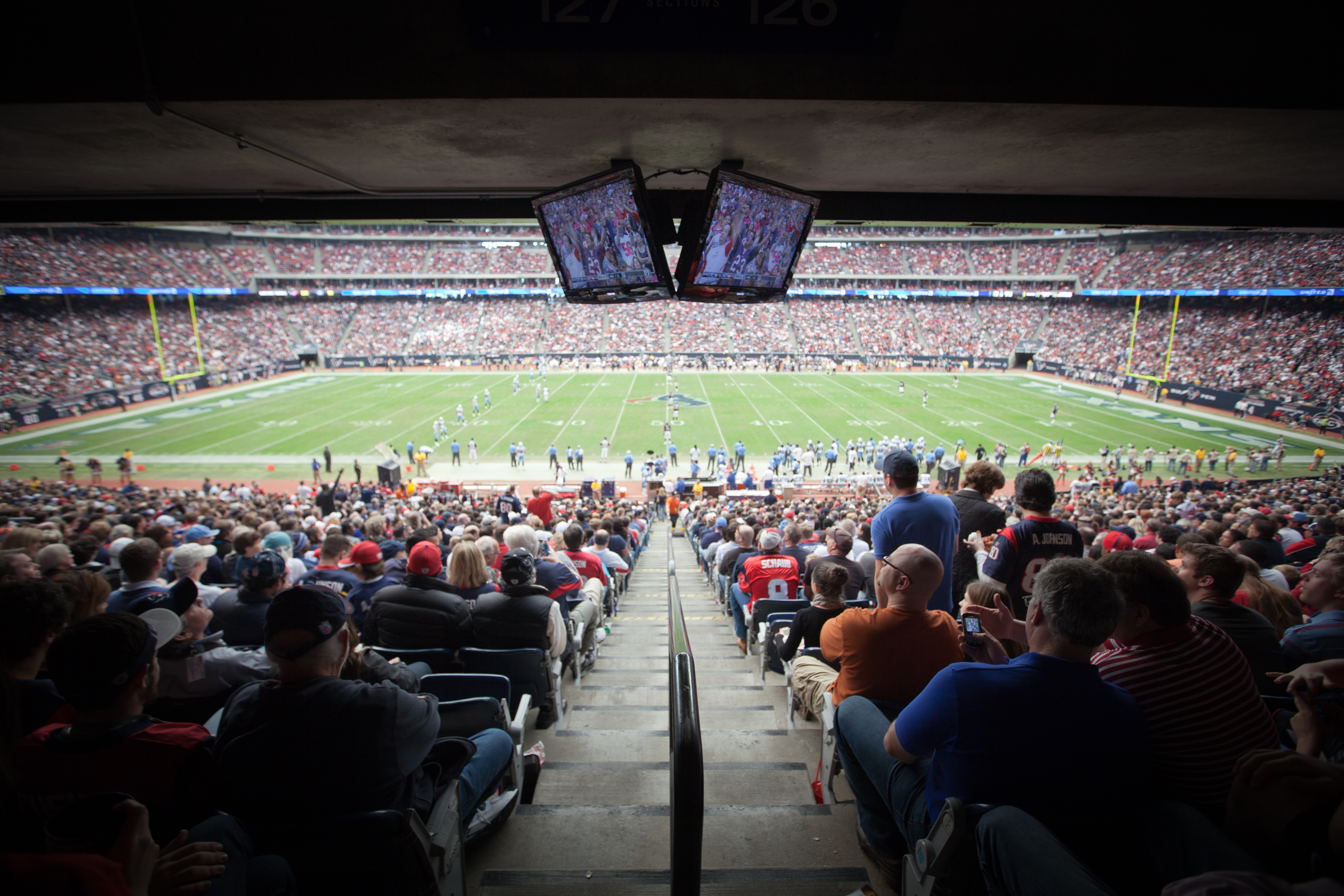
The 2013 Texas Bowl was played at Reliant Stadium.

=== Minnesota ===
Projected "universally" to finish last in their division of the Big Ten Conference, the Golden Gophers exceeded those expectations by winning eight games, and losing only four. After sweeping their non-conference schedule, they lost their first two conference matchups, including homecoming against Iowa. Subsequently, they won four consecutive games, including the Governor's Victory Bell against Penn State. They ended their season, however, on a two-game losing streak, losing to two top-20 ranked opponents – Wisconsin and Michigan State. On October 10, the university announced that coach Jerry Kill was taking a leave of absence to focus on treatment for epileptic seizures; defensive coordinator Tracy Claeys served as interim head coach.

=== Syracuse ===
Syracuse entered the season with a new head coach, offensive coordinator, and defensive coordinator after the departures of Doug Marrone and Nathaniel Hackett, and the subsequent promotion of Scott Shafer from defensive coordinator to head coach. After losing their first two games, both of which were against Big Ten opponents (Penn State and Northwestern), they won their next two games, and ultimately finished non conference play with two wins and two losses. In conference play, they lost their first game to Clemson, who at the time was ranked number four in the country, and then split their next two games before beginning a two-game winning streak, during which they defeated Wake Forest and Maryland. After that, they lost two of their final three games, including a loss to Florida State, who ultimately ended up in the 2014 BCS National Championship Game.

== Game summary ==
=== First half ===
After receiving the opening kickoff, Minnesota's opening drive stalled, forcing the Golden Gophers to punt. After Syracuse and Minnesota lost fumbles on back-to-back drives, Syracuse was able to drive deep inside Minnesota territory. Facing a 4th and 7 situation at Minnesota's 24-yard line, Syracuse attempted a fake field goal play, but holder Charley Loeb was stopped short of a first down. The game remained scoreless going into the second quarter.

Syracuse took a 7–0 lead early in the second quarter on a 1-yard touchdown run by Jerome Smith. In the next two drives, Minnesota and Syracuse exchanged punts. Minnesota finally got on board with a 41-yard field goal from Chris Hawthorne as time expired in the first half.

=== Second half ===
Syracuse received the second-half kickoff. The Orange drive stalled, however, and Syracuse was forced to punt. After forcing the Golden Gophers to punt, Syracuse went on an 86-yard, 15-play drive that was capped off with a 5-yard touchdown run from Terrel Hunt. Hunt's touchdown extended Syracuse's lead to 14–3 with 2:57 remaining in the third quarter. The game remained 14–3 going into the fourth quarter.

Minnesota opened the fourth quarter with a 20-yard touchdown pass from Mitch Leidner to Maxx Williams to make it a 14–9 game. The two-point conversion attempt failed, however, and the game remained 14–9. After forcing Syracuse to punt, Minnesota took its first lead of the game on a 55-yard touchdown pass from Mitch Leidner to Drew Wolitarsky. Minnesota's two-point conversion attempt was successful, making it a 17–14 game with 12:34 left in the game. On the next Syracuse drive, the Orange drove to Minnesota's 20-yard line. However, after a false start penalty on the Orange, quarterback Terrel Hunt was penalized for intentional grounding, forcing Syracuse to punt from Minnesota's 39-yard line. After Syracuse's defense forced a three and out, the Orange once again drove into Minnesota territory. However, Syracuse placekicker Ryan Norton missed a 45-yard field goal with 3:31 left in the game. On the ensuing drive, Minnesota was able to a get a first down on a 15-yard rush by David Cobb. However, the Golden Gophers were unable to get another first down to close out the game and were forced to punt with 2:03 remaining in the game. Syracuse's Brisly Estime proceeded to return the punt 70 yards to Minnesota's 14-yard line. The Orange then took a 21–17 lead after Terrel Hunt scrambled 12-yards for a touchdown with 1:14 remaining in the game. Syracuse then fought off two Hail Mary attempts by Minnesota to seal the victory.

== Scoring summary ==
Scoring summary

Quarter	Time	Drive			Team	Scoring information	Score	
Quarter	Time	Plays	Yards	TOP	Team	Scoring information	Syracuse	Minnesota
2	10:04	11	80	4:45	SYR	Jerome Smith 1-yard touchdown run, Ryan Norton kick good	7	0
2	0:00	11	44	4:20	MINN	41-yard field goal by Chris Hawthorne	7	3
3	2:57	15	86	5:49	SYR	Terrel Hunt 5-yard touchdown run, Norton kick good	14	3
4	14:55	8	72	3:02	MINN	Maxx Williams 20-yard touchdown reception from Mitch Leidner, 2-point pass failed	14	9
4	12:34	3	74	1:25	MINN	Drew Wolitarsky 55-yard touchdown reception from Leidner, 2-point pass good	14	17
4	1:14	3	14	0:30	SYR	Hunt 12-yard touchdown run, Norton kick good	21	17
"TOP" = time of possession. For other American football terms, see Glossary of American football.							21	17

== Statistics ==
Statistics	Syracuse	Minnesota
First downs	23	19
Total yards	396	350
Rushes-yards (net)	46–208	38–127
Passing yards (net)	188	223
Passes, Comp-Att-Int	19–29–0	13–30–0
Time of Possession	29:47	30:13

Syracuse quarterback Terrel Hunt was named the game's most valuable player. Hunt completed 19 of his 29 passes for 188 yards. Hunt also had 2 rushing touchdowns.

Syracuse outgained Minnesota 396–350 in total yards. Syracuse outgained Minnesota 208–127 in rushing yards, while Minnesota outgained Syracuse 223–188 in passing yards.

Syracuse's leading rushers were Terrel Hunt and running back Jerome Smith, who both had 74 rushing yards in the game. Syracuse's leading receiver was Brisly Estime, who had 5 catches for 47 yards. George Morris III was Syracuse's second leading rusher, who had 33 rushing yards on 8 carries.

Minnesota's leading rusher was David Cobb, who had 91 rushing yards on 18 carries. Drew Wolitarsky was Minnesota's leading receiver, with 94 receiving yards on 4 receptions. Mitch Leidner led the Golden Gophers in passing, completing 11 out of 22 passes for 205 yards and 2 touchdowns. Philip Nelson, who started the game at quarterback for the Golden Gophers, completed 2 out of 7 passes for 18 yards.
