= George McDonald (American football) =

American football player and coach (born 1976)

Current position
- Title: Wide receivers coach
- Team: LSU
- Conference: SEC

Biographical details
- Born: May 10, 1976 (age 50); Fort Wayne, Indiana, U.S.
- Education: Illinois

Playing career
- 1994–1998: Illinois
- Position: Wide receiver

Coaching career (HC unless noted)
- 2000: Ball State (GA)
- 2001–2003: Northern Illinois (WR)
- 2004: Stanford (TE)
- 2005–2006: Western Michigan (OC/WR)
- 2007–2008: Minnesota (WR)
- 2009–2010: Cleveland Browns (WR)
- 2011-2012: Miami (FL) (WR/PGC)
- 2013: Syracuse (AHC/OC)
- 2014: Syracuse (AHC/OC/WR)
- 2015–2018: NC State (WR)
- 2019–2020: NC State (co-OC/WR)
- 2021–2023: Illinois (AHC/WR)
- 2024–2025: Ole Miss (WR/PGC)
- 2026–present: LSU (WR/PGC)

George McDonald (born May 10, 1976) (also known as George McDonald-Ashford) is an American football coach. He is currently the wide receivers coach and passing game coordinator for LSU.

McDonald previously served as an assistant coach at Syracuse, Arkansas, Miami, Minnesota, Western Michigan, Stanford, Northern Illinois, Ball State, and with the Cleveland Browns of the National Football League (NFL).

McDonald is well-regarded for his ability to recruit South Florida and his native California.

== Family ==
McDonald is married to Heather [formerly Anderson] and they have a son Roman McDonald born April 2015 and Maverick born February 2020.

McDonald, the son of Juanita McDonald and George Ashford, used the hyphenated name of McDonald-Ashford during his playing career. His brother, Brian McDonald-Ashford, played running back for 2 seasons at BYU before a knee injury ended his career.

== Playing career ==
McDonald attended Buena Park High School in Buena Park, California. He played both quarterback and running back in high school while also competing in sprints on the track team. He was named the Freeway League's conference Player of the Year as a senior in 1993.

McDonald attended the University of Illinois, where he was a four-year letterman in football as a wide receiver and kickoff returner under head coaches Lou Tepper and Ron Turner. He completed his Illinois football career with 57 receptions for 589 yards and 4 touchdowns, and returned 57 kickoffs for 1,276 yards (22.4 avg).

McDonald also ran track his freshman and senior years, earning All-Big Ten honors his senior year, and set an Illinois record with a time of 6.75 in the 60 metres. McDonald earned his bachelor's degree in Health Administration and Planning from Illinois in 1999.

== Coaching career ==
McDonald began his coaching career as an assistant coach at Bucknell University, Ball State University, Northern Illinois University, and Stanford University from 1999 to 2004.

When Stanford's offensive coordinator Bill Cubit was hired as the head coach at Western Michigan Universityin 2005, he took McDonald with him. McDonald served as WMU's offensive coordinator and wide receivers coach from 2005 to 2006, and helped turn around a Broncos offense that was poorly ranked before his arrival. McDonald notably recruited WMU standouts Louis Delmas and E.J. Biggers, both from North Miami Beach High School in North Miami Beach, Florida.

McDonald departed WMU to coach wide receivers coach at the University of Minnesota in 2007, stating that it was in the best interest of his career to work at a BCS university. He served as an assistant under head coach and fellow Illinois alum Tim Brewster for the 2007 and 2008 seasons.

On February 11, 2009, the Cleveland Browns hired McDonald as offensive quality control coach under new head coach Eric Mangini. On May 8, 2009, the Cleveland Browns promoted McDonald from offensive quality control coach to wide receivers coach.

McDonald was hired by the University of Miami as the wide receivers coach under head coach Al Golden on January 11, 2011. The next season, McDonald picked up the additional title of passing game coordinator.

December 19, 2012, McDonald was named the receivers coach at Arkansas under new head Bret Bielema. However, McDonald resigned from Arkansas when the position of offensive coordinator opened at Syracuse. On January 15, 2013, MacDonald was officially named offensive coordinator under new head coach Scott Shafer. Shafer and McDonald had previously served on the same coaching staffs at Western Michigan and Northern Illinois. On October 6, 2014, McDonald was demoted from offensive coordinator and assistant head coach to wide receivers coach. He was replaced as offensive coordinator by quarterbacks coach Tim Lester.

On January 6, 2015, McDonald was named the wide receivers coach at NC State under head coach Dave Doeren.

On January 21, 2020, McDonald was named the wide receivers coach at Illinois under head coach Bret Bielema.

On January 27, 2024, McDonald was named the wide receivers coach at Ole Miss under head coach Lane Kiffin.

McDonald has also served as an NFL coaching intern during training camps with the New York Jets (2004, 2006), Chicago Bears (2005) and Tampa Bay Buccaneers (2007).
