= 2013 Yale Bulldogs football team =

American college football season

2013 Yale Bulldogs football
- Conference: Ivy League
- Record: 5-5 (3-4 Ivy)
- Head coach: Tony Reno (2nd season)
- Offensive coordinator: Kevin Morris (2nd season)
- Offensive scheme: Pro-style
- Defensive coordinator: Rick Flanders (2nd season)
- Base defense: 4–3
- Home stadium: Yale Bowl

2013 Ivy League football standings
	Conf.			Overall
Team	W		L	W		L
Harvard +	6	–	1	9	–	1
Princeton +	6	–	1	8	–	2
Dartmouth	5	–	2	6	–	4
Brown	3	–	4	6	–	4
Yale	3	–	4	5	–	5
Penn	3	–	4	4	–	6
Cornell	2	–	5	3	–	7
Columbia	0	–	7	0	–	10
+ – Conference co-champions

The 2013 Yale Bulldogs football team represented Yale University in the 2013 NCAA Division I FCS football season. They were led by second-year head coach Tony Reno and played their home games at the Yale Bowl. They were a member of the Ivy League. The finished with a record with of 5–5 overall and 3–4 in Ivy League play for a three-way tie for fourth place. Yale averaged 19,809 fans per game.

== Schedule ==
Date	Time	Opponent	Site	TV	Result	Attendance
September 21	1:00 p.m.	at Colgate*	Andy Kerr Stadium; Hamilton, NY		W 39–22	6,241
September 28	12:00 p.m.	Cornell	Yale Bowl; New Haven, CT		W 38–23	18,600
October 5	5:00 p.m.	at No. 18 Cal Poly*	Alex G. Spanos Stadium; San Luis Obisoo, CA		W 24–10	8,376
October 12	1:30 p.m.	at Dartmouth	Memorial Stadium; Hanover, NH	FCS Central	L 13–20	10,983
October 19	12:00 p.m.	No. 8 Fordham*	Yale Bowl; New Haven, CT		L 31–52	13,691
October 26	1:00 p.m.	at Penn	Franklin Field; Philadelphia, PA		L 17–28	11,289
November 2	12:00 p.m.	Columbia	Yale Bowl; New Haven, CT	YES	W 53–12	7,832
November 9	12:00 p.m.	Brown	Yale Bowl; New Haven, CT		W 24–17	7,988
November 16	1:00 p.m.	at No. 25 Princeton	Powers Field at Princeton Stadium; Princeton, NJ (rivalry)	ESPN3	L 23–59	14,824
November 23	12:00 p.m.	Harvard	Yale Bowl; New Haven, CT (rivalry)	NBCSN	L 7–34	50,934
*Non-conference game; Rankings from The Sports Network Poll released prior to the game; All times are in Eastern time
