= 2013 Central Connecticut Blue Devils football team =

American college football season

2013 Central Connecticut Blue Devils football
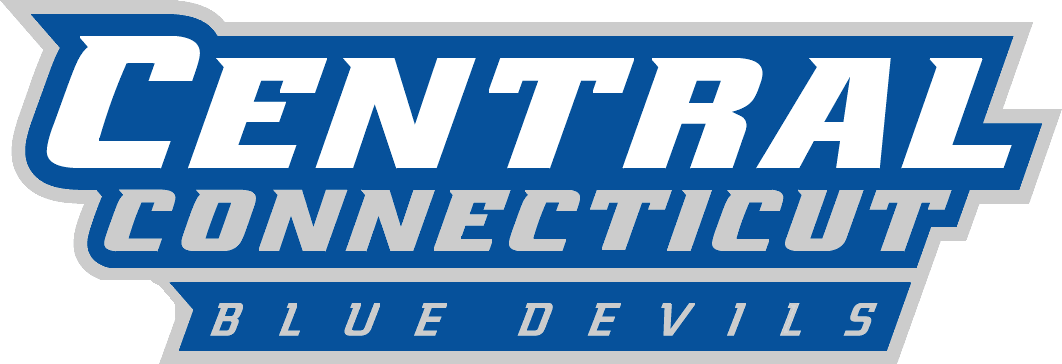
- Conference: Northeast Conference
- Record: 4–8 (2–4 NEC)
- Head coach: Jeff McInerney (8th season)
- Offensive coordinator: Tim Stowers
- Home stadium: Arute Field

2013 Northeast Conference football standings
| | Conf. | | | Overall |
| Team | W | | L | W | | L |
|---|---|---|---|---|---|---|
| Sacred Heart +^ | 4 | – | 2 | 10 | – | 3 |
| Duquesne + | 4 | – | 2 | 7 | – | 4 |
| Robert Morris | 3 | – | 3 | 5 | – | 6 |
| Saint Francis (PA) | 3 | – | 3 | 5 | – | 6 |
| Bryant | 3 | – | 3 | 5 | – | 7 |
| Central Connecticut | 2 | – | 4 | 4 | – | 8 |
| Wagner | 2 | – | 4 | 3 | – | 8 |
+ – Conference co-champions; ^ – FCS playoff participant

The 2013 Central Connecticut Blue Devils football team represented Central Connecticut State University in the 2013 NCAA Division I FCS football season. They were led by eighth year head coach Jeff McInerney and played their home games at Arute Field. They were a member of the Northeast Conference. They finished the season 4–8, 2–4 in NEC play to finish in a tie for sixth place.

== Schedule ==
| Date | Time | Opponent | Site | TV | Result | Attendance |
|---|---|---|---|---|---|---|
| August 31 | 6:00 p.m. | at No. 19 James Madison* | Bridgeforth Stadium; Harrisonburg, VA | | L 14–38 | 23,541 |
| September 7 | 12:30 p.m. | at No. 23 Lehigh* | Goodman Stadium; Bethlehem, PA | | L 44–51 ^{2OT} | 6,386 |
| September 14 | 6:00 p.m. | Holy Cross* | Arute Field; New Britain, CT | NECFR | L 21–52 | 5,122 |
| September 21 | 7:00 p.m. | at Albany* | Bob Ford Field; Albany, NY | | W 20–17 | 6,412 |
| September 28 | 1:00 p.m. | at Rhode Island* | Meade Stadium; Kingston, RI | | L 7–42 | 5,223 |
| October 5 | 1:00 p.m. | Saint Francis (PA) | Arute Field; New Britain, CT | ESPN3 | W 38–29 | 4,119 |
| October 12 | 1:00 p.m. | at Sacred Heart | Campus Field; Fairfield, CT | NECFR | L 36–59 | 1,190 |
| October 26 | 1:00 p.m. | Salve Regina* | Arute Field; New Britain, CT | NECFR | W 47–13 | 3,312 |
| November 2 | 1:00 p.m. | at Wagner | Wagner College Stadium; Staten Island, NY | NECFR | W 52–17 | 1,656 |
| November 9 | 12:00 p.m. | Robert Morris | Arute Field; New Britain, CT | NECFR | L 21–54 | 2,004 |
| November 16 | 12:10 p.m. | at Duquesne | Arthur J. Rooney Athletic Field; Pittsburgh, PA | | L 21–24 | 2,022 |
| November 23 | 1:00 p.m. | Bryant | Arute Field; New Britain, CT | NECFR | L 16–29 | 2,048 |
*Non-conference game; Rankings from The Sports Network Poll released prior to the game; All times are in Eastern time
