= 2013 Bryant Bulldogs football team =

American college football season

2013 Bryant Bulldogs football
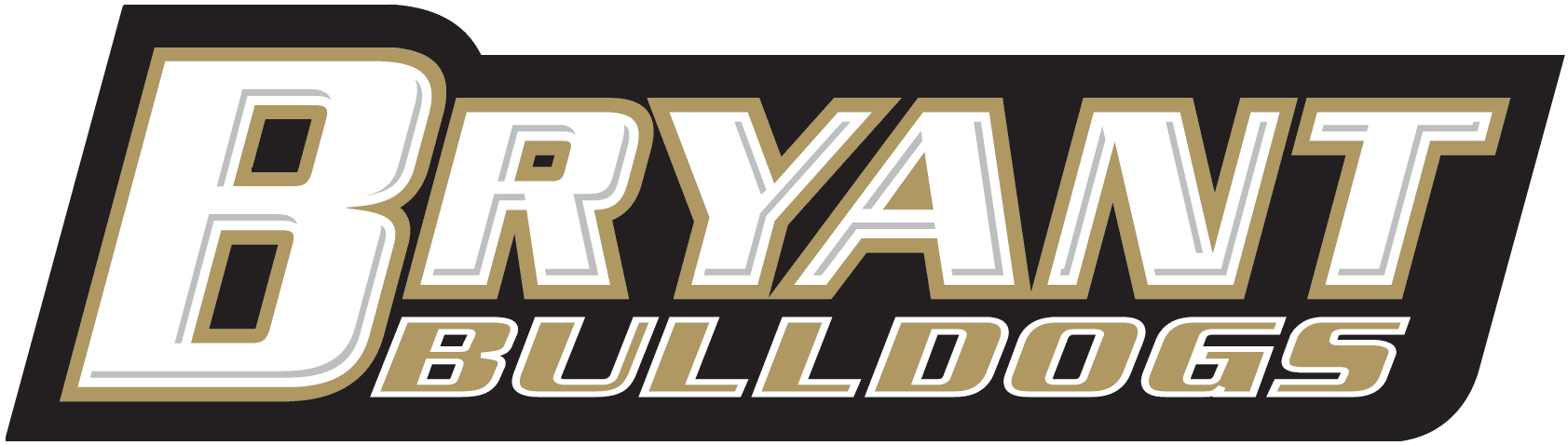
- Conference: Northeast Conference
- Record: 5–7 (3–3 NEC)
- Head coach: Marty Fine (10th season)
- Defensive coordinator: Greg Gigantino (7th season)
- Home stadium: Bulldog Stadium

2013 Northeast Conference football standings
	Conf.			Overall
Team	W		L	W		L
Sacred Heart +^	4	–	2	10	–	3
Duquesne +	4	–	2	7	–	4
Robert Morris	3	–	3	5	–	6
Saint Francis (PA)	3	–	3	5	–	6
Bryant	3	–	3	5	–	7
Central Connecticut	2	–	4	4	–	8
Wagner	2	–	4	3	–	8
+ – Conference co-champions; ^ – FCS playoff participant

The 2013 Bryant Bulldogs football team represented Bryant University as a member of the Northeast Conference (NEC) during the 2013 NCAA Division I FCS football season. Led by tenth-year head coach Marty Fine, the Bulldogs compiled an overall record of 5–7 with a mark of 3–3 in conference play, placing in a three-way tie for third in the NEC. Bryant played home games at Bulldog Stadium in Smithfield, Rhode Island.

== Schedule ==
Date	Time	Opponent	Site	TV	Result	Attendance	Source
August 31	3:00 p.m.	Holy Cross*	Bulldog Stadium; Smithfield, RI	NECFR	W 17–16	4,817	
September 7	1:00 p.m.	Assumption*	Bulldog Stadium; Smithfield, RI	NECFR	W 34–7	2,767	
September 14	3:30 p.m.	at Maine*	Alfond Stadium; Orono, ME		L 22–35	5,863	
September 28	1:00 p.m.	at Wagner	Wagner College Stadium; Staten Island, NY	ESPN3	W 47–28	2,493	
October 5	6:00 p.m.	at Stony Brook*	Kenneth P. LaValle Stadium; Stony Brook, NY		L 13–21	11,224	
October 12	1:00 p.m.	Brown*^{†}	Bulldog Stadium; Smithfield, RI	NECFR	L 14–41	4,288	
October 19	1:00 p.m.	Sacred Heart	Bulldog Stadium; Smithfield, RI	NECFR	L 28–56	1,568	
October 26	1:00 p.m.	Duquesne	Bulldog Stadium; Smithfield, RI	NECFR	W 42–14	3,761	
November 2	12:00 p.m.	at Robert Morris	Joe Walton Stadium; Moon Township, PA	ESPN3	L 3–24	1,432	
November 9	12:00 p.m.	Saint Francis (PA)	Bulldog Stadium; Smithfield, RI	NECFR	L 20–23	773	
November 16	12:00 p.m.	Monmouth*	Bulldog Stadium; Smithfield, RI	NECFR	L 18–21	1,090	
November 23	1:00 p.m.	at Central Connecticut	Arute Field; New Britain, CT	NECFR	W 29–16	2,048	
*Non-conference game; ^{†}Homecoming; All times are in Eastern time
