= 2013 Holy Cross Crusaders football team =

American college football season

2013 Holy Cross Crusaders football
- Conference: Patriot League
- Record: 3–9 (1–4 Patriot)
- Head coach: Tom Gilmore (10th season)
- Offensive coordinator: Andy McKenzie (6th season)
- Defensive coordinator: Andy Rondeau (2nd season)
- Home stadium: Fitton Field

2013 Patriot League football standings
	Conf.			Overall
Team	W		L	W		L
Lafayette $^	4	–	1	5	–	7
Lehigh	3	–	2	8	–	3
Bucknell	3	–	2	6	–	5
Colgate	3	–	2	4	–	8
Holy Cross	1	–	4	3	–	9
Georgetown	1	–	4	2	–	9
No. 9 Fordham ^	0	–	0	12	–	2
$ – Conference champion; ^ – FCS playoff participant; Fordham was ineligible for conference title because they previously offered football scholarships while other Patriot League members did not.; Rankings from The Sports Network poll

The 2013 Holy Cross Crusaders football team represented the College of the Holy Cross in the 2013 NCAA Division I FCS football season. They were led by tenth-year head coach Tom Gilmore and played their home games at Fitton Field. They were a member of the Patriot League. They finished the season 3–9, 1–4 in Patriot League play to finish in a tie for fifth place.

== Schedule ==
Date	Time	Opponent	Site	TV	Result	Attendance
August 31	3:00 pm	at Bryant*	Bulldog Stadium; Smithfield, RI		L 16–17	4,817
September 7	1:00 pm	No. 5 Towson*	Fitton Field; Worcester, MA	PLN	L 7–49	6,281
September 14	6:00 pm	at Central Connecticut*	Arute Field; New Britain, CT	NECFR	W 52–21	5,122
September 21	6:00 pm	Monmouth*	Fitton Field; Worcester, MA	PLN	L 14–21	8,223
September 28	7:00 pm	at Dartmouth*	Memorial Stadium; Hanover, NH	FCS Central	W 31–28	9,227
October 5	1:00 pm	Harvard*^{†}	Fitton Field; Worcester, MA	WCTR	L 35–41 ^{3OT}	8,276
October 12	1:00 pm	at Bucknell	Christy Mathewson–Memorial Stadium; Lewisburg, PA	PLN	W 51–27	2,815
October 19	12:00 pm	Colgate	Fitton Field; Worcester, MA	CBSSN	L 24–28	6,882
October 26	1:00 pm	Lafayette	Fitton Field; Worcester, MA	WCTR	L 23–41	9,184
November 2	1:00 pm	at No. 8 Fordham	Coffey Field; Bronx, NY (Ram–Crusader Cup)	PLN	L 30–32	7,846
November 9	12:30 pm	at No. 21 Lehigh	Goodman Stadium; Bethlehem, PA	PLN	L 20–34	6,745
November 23	12:30 pm	Georgetown	Fitton Field; Worcester, MA	PLN	L 21–28	2,478
*Non-conference game; ^{†}Homecoming; Rankings from The Sports Network Poll released prior to the game; All times are in Eastern time
