= 2013 Cornell Big Red football team =

American college football season

2013 Cornell Big Red football
- Conference: Ivy League
- Record: 3–7 (2–5 Ivy)
- Head coach: David Archer (1st season)
- Offensive coordinator: Jason Houghtaling (1st season)
- Defensive coordinator: Jared Backus (1st season)
- Captains: Brett Buehler; Grant Gellatly; Michael Hernandez; Jeff Mathews; Tre' Minor
- Home stadium: Schoellkopf Field

2013 Ivy League football standings
	Conf.			Overall
Team	W		L	W		L
Harvard +	6	–	1	9	–	1
Princeton +	6	–	1	8	–	2
Dartmouth	5	–	2	6	–	4
Brown	3	–	4	6	–	4
Yale	3	–	4	5	–	5
Penn	3	–	4	4	–	6
Cornell	2	–	5	3	–	7
Columbia	0	–	7	0	–	10
+ – Conference co-champions

The 2013 Cornell Big Red football team represented Cornell University in the 2013 NCAA Division I FCS football season as a member of the Ivy League. They were led by first-year head coach David Archer and played their home games at Schoellkopf Field. Cornell finished the season with a record of 3–7 overall and 2–5 in Ivy League play to place seventh. Cornell averaged 7,002 fans per game.

== Schedule ==
Date	Time	Opponent	Site	TV	Result	Attendance
September 21	3:00 p.m.	Bucknell*	Schoellkopf Field; Ithaca, NY		W 45–13	15,442
September 28	12:00 p.m.	at Yale	Yale Bowl; New Haven, CT		L 23–38	18,600
October 5	12:30 p.m.	Colgate*	Schoellkopf Field; Ithaca, NY (rivalry)		L 20–41	4,973
October 12	12:30 p.m.	Harvard	Schoellkopf Field; Ithaca, NY		L 24–34	8,329
October 19	1:00 p.m.	at Monmouth*	Kessler Field; West Long Branch, NJ		L 23–48	4,553
October 26	12:30 p.m.	Brown	Schoellkopf Field; Ithaca, NY		L 35–42	3,195
November 2	1:00 p.m.	at Princeton	Powers Field at Princeton Stadium; Princeton, NJ	ESPN3	L 20–53	7,206
November 9	4:00 p.m.	at Dartmouth	Memorial Stadium; Hanover, NH (rivalry)	NBCSN	L 6–34	3,477
November 16	12:30 p.m.	Columbia	Schoellkopf Field; Ithaca, NY (rivalry)	FCS	W 24–9	3,073
November 23	1:00 p.m.	at Penn	Franklin Field; Philadelphia, PA (rivalry)		W 42–41	7,057
*Non-conference game; All times are in Eastern time
