= 2013 Princeton Tigers football team =

American college football season

2013 Princeton Tigers football

Ivy League co-champion
- Conference: Ivy League
- Record: 8–2 (6–1 Ivy)
- Head coach: Bob Surace (4th season)
- Offensive coordinator: James Perry (4th season)
- Offensive scheme: Spread option
- Co-defensive coordinators: Steve Verbit (1st season); Jim Salgado (1st season)
- Base defense: 3–3–5 or 4–2–5
- Home stadium: Powers Field at Princeton Stadium

2013 Ivy League football standings
| | Conf. | | | Overall |
| Team | W | | L | W | | L |
|---|---|---|---|---|---|---|
| Harvard + | 6 | – | 1 | 9 | – | 1 |
| Princeton + | 6 | – | 1 | 8 | – | 2 |
| Dartmouth | 5 | – | 2 | 6 | – | 4 |
| Brown | 3 | – | 4 | 6 | – | 4 |
| Yale | 3 | – | 4 | 5 | – | 5 |
| Penn | 3 | – | 4 | 4 | – | 6 |
| Cornell | 2 | – | 5 | 3 | – | 7 |
| Columbia | 0 | – | 7 | 0 | – | 10 |
+ – Conference co-champions

The 2013 Princeton Tigers football team represented Princeton University in the 2013 NCAA Division I FCS football season. They were led by fourth-year head coach Bob Surace and played their home games at Powers Field at Princeton Stadium. Princeton was a member of the Ivy League. They finished with a record of 8–2 overall and 6–1 in Ivy League play to share the conference title with Harvard, their first title since 2006. Princeton averaged 7,042 fans per game.

On October 26, the Tigers defeated Harvard in their rivalry game by a score of 51–48 in triple overtime. It was their first win at Harvard Stadium since 2005.

== Schedule ==
| Date | Time | Opponent | Rank | Site | TV | Result | Attendance |
|---|---|---|---|---|---|---|---|
| September 21 | 6:00 p.m. | No. 22 Lehigh* | | Powers Field at Princeton Stadium; Princeton, NJ | NBCSN | L 28–29 | 6,982 |
| September 28 | 2:00 p.m. | at Georgetown* | | Multi-Sport Field; Washington, DC | | W 50–22 | 2,981 |
| October 5 | 1:00 p.m. | Columbia | | Powers Field at Princeton Stadium; Princeton, NJ | ESPN3 | W 53–7 | 5,689 |
| October 12 | 1:00 p.m. | Lafayette* | | Powers Field at Princeton Stadium; Princeton, NJ | ESPN3 | W 42–26 | 7,494 |
| October 19 | 6:00 p.m. | at Brown | | Brown Stadium; Providence, RI | FCS Pacific | W 39–17 | 8,062 |
| October 26 | 1:00 p.m. | at Harvard | | Harvard Stadium; Boston, MA (rivalry) | FCS Atlantic | W 51–48 ^{3OT} | 11,188 |
| November 2 | 1:00 p.m. | Cornell | | Powers Field at Princeton Stadium; Princeton, NJ | ESPN3 | W 53–20 | 7,206 |
| November 9 | 12:00 p.m. | at Penn | | Franklin Field; Philadelphia, PA (rivalry) | | W 38–26 | 21,214 |
| November 16 | 1:00 p.m. | Yale | No. 25 | Powers Field at Princeton Stadium; Princeton, NJ (rivalry) | ESPN3 | W 59–23 | 14,824 |
| November 23 | 1:30 p.m. | at Dartmouth | No. 22 | Memorial Stadium; Hanover, NH | | L 24–28 | 4,386 |
*Non-conference game; Rankings from The Sports Network Poll released prior to the game; All times are in Eastern time
