= 2013 Penn Quakers football team =

American college football season

2013 Penn Quakers football
- Conference: Ivy League
- Record: 4–6 (3–4 Ivy)
- Head coach: Al Bagnoli (22nd season)
- Offensive coordinator: Jon McLaughlin (5th season)
- Defensive coordinator: Ray Priore (16th season)
- Home stadium: Franklin Field

2013 Ivy League football standings
	Conf.			Overall
Team	W		L	W		L
Harvard +	6	–	1	9	–	1
Princeton +	6	–	1	8	–	2
Dartmouth	5	–	2	6	–	4
Brown	3	–	4	6	–	4
Yale	3	–	4	5	–	5
Penn	3	–	4	4	–	6
Cornell	2	–	5	3	–	7
Columbia	0	–	7	0	–	10
+ – Conference co-champions

The 2013 Penn Quakers football team represented the University of Pennsylvania in the 2013 NCAA Division I FCS football season. They were led by 22nd year head coach Al Bagnoli and played their home games at Franklin Field. They were a member of the Ivy League. They finished with a record of 4–6 overall and 3–4 in Ivy League play for three-way tie for fourth place. Penn averaged 11,936 fans per game.

== Schedule ==
Date	Time	Opponent	Site	TV	Result	Attendance
September 21	6:00 p.m.	Lafayette*	Franklin Field; Philadelphia, PA	ESPN3	W 27–21	8,103
September 28	5:00 p.m.	at No. 19 Villanova*	Villanova Stadium; Villanova, PA		L 6–35	8,717
October 5	1:00 p.m.	Dartmouth	Franklin Field; Philadelphia, PA		W 37–31 ^{4OT}	12,017
October 12	3:30 p.m.	at William & Mary*	Zable Stadium; Williamsburg, VA		L 14–27	7,921
October 19	1:30 p.m.	at Columbia	Robert K. Kraft Field at Lawrence A. Wien Stadium; New York, NY		W 21–7	10,820
October 26	1:00 p.m.	Yale	Franklin Field; Philadelphia, PA		W 28–17	11,289
November 2	12:30 p.m.	at Brown	Brown Stadium; Providence, RI	FCS Central	L 0–27	4,590
November 9	Noon	Princeton	Franklin Field; Philadelphia, PA (rivalry)		L 26–38	21,214
November 16	Noon	at Harvard	Harvard Stadium; Boston, MA (rivalry)	NBCSN	L 30–38	10,235
November 23	1:00 p.m.	Cornell	Franklin Field; Philadelphia, PA (rivalry)		L 41–42	7,057
*Non-conference game; Rankings from The Sports Network Poll released prior to the game; All times are in Eastern time

== Coaching staff ==
Name	Position	Seasons at Penn	Alma mater
Al Bagnoli	Head coach	21	Central Connecticut State
Steven Downs	Running backs coach	15	Central State University
Jon Dupont	Linebackers coach	7	St. Lawrence University
Mark Fabish	Wide receivers coach/passing game coordinator	4	Penn
Jon McLaughlin	Offensive coordinator/offensive line coach	8	Alfred University
Ray Priore	Associate head coach/defensive coordinator/ Defensive backs coach	27	Albany University
Jim Schaefer	Defensive line coach	22	St. Lawrence University
Rick Ulrich	Tight ends coach	8	West Chester University
Dave Wood	Defensive assistant	3	Widener University
Larry Woods	Quarterbacks coach	22	St. John's University

== Game summaries ==
=== September 21 vs. Lafayette ===
Lafayette vs. Penn – Game summary

Quarter	1	2	3	4	Total
Lafayette	0	7	0	14	21
Penn	10	3	14	0	27

at Franklin Field

- Date: September 21
- Game time: 6:00 p.m. EDT
- Game attendance: 8,103
- TV announcers (ESPN3 and ESPN GamePlan (simulcast of Lafayette Sports Network): Gary Laubach, Mike Joseph, John Leone
- ESPN Box Score

Game information

First quarter

- PENN – Ty Taylor 5 Yd Pass From Billy Ragone (Connor Loftus Kick), 9:15 (PENN 7–0)
- PENN – Connor Loftus 30 Yd field goal, 0:27 (PENN 10–0)

Second quarter

- LAF – Mark Ross 29 Yd Pass From Zach Zweizig (Ryan Gralish Kick), 12:40 (PENN 10–7)
- PENN – Connor Loftus 39 Yd field goal, 7:52 (PENN 13–7)

Third quarter

- PENN – Mitchell King 4 Yd Pass From Billy Ragone (Connor Loftus Kick), 11:30 (PENN 20–7)
- PENN – Spencer Kulcsar 7 Yd Run (Connor Loftus Kick), 6:11 (PENN 27–7)

Fourth quarter

- LAF – Ross Scheuerman 7 Yd Run (Ryan Gralish Kick), 10:51 (PENN 27–14)
- LAF – Ross Scheuerman 1 Yd Run (Ryan Gralish Kick), 5:31 (PENN 27–21)

Top passer

- Billy Ragone – 21/28, 218 yards, 2 TD, INT

Top rusher

- Brandon Colavita – 15 rushes, 56 yards

Top receiver

- Spencer Kulcsar – 5 receptions, 66 yards

Improving to 4–0 when wearing their alternate red jerseys, the Quakers defeated the Lafayette Leopards 27–21 for the program's 820th overall win, 10th in the NCAA.

=== September 28 vs. Villanova ===
Penn vs. Villanova – Game summary

Quarter	1	2	3	4	Total
Penn	0	0	6	0	6
Villanova	14	7	7	7	35

at Villanova Stadium

- Date: September 28
- Game time: 5:00 p.m. EDT
- Game attendance: 8,717
- TV: The Comcast Network
- ESPN Box Score

Game information

First quarter

- VILL – Joe Price 15 Yd Pass From John Robertson (Mark Hamilton Kick), 7:52 (VILL 7–0)
- VILL – Craig James 73 Yd Return Of Blocked Field Goal (Mark Hamilton Kick), 1:14 (VILL 14–0)

Second quarter

- VILL – Poppy Livers 50 Yd Pass From John Robertson (Mark Hamilton Kick), 11:08 (VILL 21–0)

Third quarter

- PENN – Spencer Kulcsar 9 Yd Pass From Billy Ragone (XP no good), 7:08 (VILL 21–6)
- VILL – John Robertson 36 Yd Run (Mark Hamilton Kick), 5:08 (VILL 28–6)

Fourth quarter

- VILL – Poppy Livers 6 Yd Pass From John Robertson (Mark Hamilton Kick), 14:18 (VILL 35–6)

Top passer

- Billy Ragone – 18/35, 192 yards, TD, INT

Top rusher

- Brandon Colavita – 11 rushes, 20 yards

Top receiver

- Conner Scott – 11 receptions, 129 yards

In their second game, Villanova trounced the Quakers at Villanova Stadium in a crosstown rivalry for the 12th consecutive season. Of the many shortcomings from Penn in the game, "all pale in comparison to what happened to Penn’s running game". They had a total of 21 carries for just 43 yards, averaging just over two yards per carry. Villanova's coach Andy Talley commented, "I just think our D-line played a little better than their O-line today." After the "reality check", the Quakers were set to begin their Ivy League slate.
