= 2013 Dartmouth Big Green football team =

American college football season

2013 Dartmouth Big Green football
- Conference: Ivy League
- Record: 6–4 (5–2 Ivy)
- Head coach: Buddy Teevens (14th season)
- Offensive coordinator: Keith Clark (4th season)
- Offensive scheme: Multiple
- Defensive coordinator: Don Dobes (4th season)
- Base defense: 4–3
- Home stadium: Memorial Field

2013 Ivy League football standings
	Conf.			Overall
Team	W		L	W		L
Harvard +	6	–	1	9	–	1
Princeton +	6	–	1	8	–	2
Dartmouth	5	–	2	6	–	4
Brown	3	–	4	6	–	4
Yale	3	–	4	5	–	5
Penn	3	–	4	4	–	6
Cornell	2	–	5	3	–	7
Columbia	0	–	7	0	–	10
+ – Conference co-champions

The 2013 Dartmouth Big Green football team represented Dartmouth College in the 2013 NCAA Division I FCS football season. The Big Green were led by head coach Buddy Teevens in his ninth straight year and 14th overall and played their home games at Memorial Field. They were a member of the Ivy League. Dartmouth averaged 6,243 fans per game. They finished with a record of 6–4 overall and 5–2 in Ivy League play to place third.

== Schedule ==
Date	Time	Opponent	Site	TV	Result	Attendance
September 21	6:00 p.m.	at Butler*	Butler Bowl; Indianapolis, IN		W 30–23	3,194
September 28	7:00 p.m.	Holy Cross*	Memorial Stadium; Hanover, NH	FCS Central	L 28–31	9,227
October 5	1:00 p.m.	at Penn	Franklin Field; Philadelphia, PA		L 31–37 ^{4OT}	12,017
October 12	1:30 p.m.	Yale^{†}	Memorial Stadium; Hanover, NH	FCS Central	W 20–13	10,983
October 19	1:30 p.m.	Bucknell*	Memorial Field; Hanover, NH		L 14–17	3,629
October 26	1:30 p.m.	Columbia	Memorial Stadium; Hanover, NH		W 56–0	3,142
November 2	5:00 p.m.	at Harvard	Harvard Stadium; Boston, MA (rivalry)		L 21–24	13,470
November 9	4:00 p.m.	Cornell	Memorial Stadium; Hanover, NH (rivalry)	NBCSN	W 34–6	3,477
November 16	12:30 p.m.	at Brown	Brown Stadium; Providence, RI		W 24–20	3,234
November 23	1:30 p.m.	No. 22 Princeton	Memorial Stadium; Hanover, NH		W 28–24	4,386
*Non-conference game; ^{†}Homecoming; Rankings from The Sports Network Poll released prior to the game; All times are in Eastern time
