= 2013 Harvard Crimson football team =

American college football season

2013 Harvard Crimson football

Ivy League co-champion
- Conference: Ivy League

Ranking
- FCS Coaches: No. 23
- Record: 9–1 (6–1 Ivy)
- Head coach: Tim Murphy (20th season)
- Offensive coordinator: Joel Lamb (8th season)
- Offensive scheme: Spread
- Defensive coordinator: Scott Larkee (5th season)
- Base defense: 4–3
- Captain: Joshua Boyd
- Home stadium: Harvard Stadium

2013 Ivy League football standings
	Conf.			Overall
Team	W		L	W		L
Harvard +	6	–	1	9	–	1
Princeton +	6	–	1	8	–	2
Dartmouth	5	–	2	6	–	4
Brown	3	–	4	6	–	4
Yale	3	–	4	5	–	5
Penn	3	–	4	4	–	6
Cornell	2	–	5	3	–	7
Columbia	0	–	7	0	–	10
+ – Conference co-champions

The 2013 Harvard Crimson football team represented Harvard University in the 2013 NCAA Division I FCS football season. They were led by 20th-year head coach Tim Murphy and played their home games at Harvard Stadium. They were a member of the Ivy League. They finish with a record of 9–1 overall and 6–1 in Ivy League play to share the Ivy League title with Princeton. Harvard averaged 12,066 fans per game.

== Schedule ==
Date	Time	Opponent	Site	TV	Result	Attendance
September 21	3:00 p.m.	at San Diego*	Torero Stadium; San Diego, CA		W 42–20	4,256
September 28	7:30 p.m.	Brown	Harvard Stadium; Boston, MA	NBCSN	W 41–23	17,256
October 5	1:00 p.m.	at Holy Cross*	Fitton Field; Worcester, MA		W 41–35 ^{3OT}	8,276
October 12	12:30 p.m.	at Cornell	Schoellkopf Field; Ithaca, NY		W 34–24	8,329
October 19	1:00 p.m.	Lafayette*	Harvard Stadium; Boston, MA	ESPN3	W 35–16	8,185
October 26	1:00 p.m.	Princeton	Harvard Stadium; Boston, MA (rivalry)	FCS Atlantic	L 48–51 ^{3OT}	11,188
November 2	5:00 p.m.	Dartmouth	Harvard Stadium; Boston, MA (rivalry)		W 24–21	13,470
November 9	12:30 p.m.	at Columbia	Robert K. Kraft Field at Lawrence A. Wien Stadium; New York, NY		W 34–0	4,622
November 16	12:00 p.m.	Penn	Harvard Stadium; Boston, MA (rivalry)	NBCSN	W 38–30	10,235
November 23	12:00 p.m.	at Yale	Yale Bowl; New Haven, CT (rivalry)	NBCSN	W 34–7	50,934
*Non-conference game; All times are in Eastern time

== Rankings ==
Ranking movements Legend: ██ Increase in ranking ██ Decrease in ranking RV = Received votes
	Week														
Poll	Pre	1	2	3	4	5	6	7	8	9	10	11	12	13	Final
Sports Network	RV	RV	RV	RV	RV	RV	RV	RV	RV	RV	RV	RV	RV	RV	RV
Coaches	RV	RV	RV	RV	RV	RV	RV	25	23	RV	RV	RV	RV	22	23
