= Scott Shafer =

American football player and coach (born 1967)

- Shafer coaching Syracuse in 2013

Biographical details
- Born: January 6, 1967 (age 59)

Playing career
- 1985: Ohio
- 1987–1989: Baldwin–Wallace
- Position: Quarterback

Coaching career (HC unless noted)
- 1991–1992: Indiana (GA)
- 1993–1995: Rhode Island (DB)
- 1996–1999: Northern Illinois (DB)
- 2000–2003: Northern Illinois (DC)
- 2004: Illinois (DB)
- 2005–2006: Western Michigan (DC)
- 2007: Stanford (AHC/DC)
- 2008: Michigan (DC)
- 2009–2010: Syracuse (DC)
- 2011: Syracuse (DC/DB)
- 2012: Syracuse (DC)
- 2013–2015: Syracuse
- 2017–2023: Middle Tennessee (DC/S)

Head coaching record
- Overall: 14–23
- Bowls: 1–0

Scott Shafer (born January 6, 1967) is an American football coach and former player. He served as the defensive coordinator for the Middle Tennessee State Blue Raiders until the 2023 season. Previously, he served as the head coach at Syracuse University from 2013-15.

He was a high school and college quarterback in Ohio at Riverside High School, Ohio University, and Baldwin-Wallace College. He has held various positions including defensive coordinator, assistant head coach, and secondary coach at major universities such as the Rhode Island, Northern Illinois, Illinois, Western Michigan, Stanford, Michigan, and Syracuse. He was named the head coach of Syracuse on January 9, 2013.

== Early life and education ==
Shafer's father, Ron, was a high school football and track coach at Riverside High School in Painesville, Ohio. His father died at age 53 after coaching 28 years at Riverside High. As an Ohio native, Shafer attended school in Painesville, Ohio where he received his high school diploma in 1985. He attended Baldwin-Wallace College in Berea, Ohio, where he received his bachelor's degree in education in 1990. He went on to study at Indiana University in Bloomington, Indiana, where he was awarded a master's degree in education in 1993.

== Playing career ==
Shafer played football for Riverside High School, Ohio University, and Baldwin–Wallace College. While at Riverside, he played quarterback and was the 1984 Northeastern Conference Most Valuable Player. He went on to play quarterback at Ohio University in the Mid-American Conference. During the 1985 season, he suffered a knee injury that required him to have surgery and miss the remainder of the season.

After the 1985 season, Shafer transferred to Baldwin–Wallace College, where he played quarterback for the Baldwin Wallace Yellow Jackets from 1987 to 1989. Playing in the Yellow Jackets' run and shoot offense, Shafer was ranked 17th in the nation in passing efficiency and earned team MVP honors. In 1989, he led the Yellow Jackets to a 5–2–1 record. In the final game of the 1989 season, Shafer was 16-for-31 passing for 237 yards and three touchdowns, throwing a 55-yard touchdown pass to Jerry Wrobel with 2:52 left to play for a 25–19 win over previously unbeaten John Carroll. He finished the 1989 season with a 139.39 passing efficiency rating, best in the Ohio Athletic Conference.

== Coaching career ==
Shafer has held numerous positions within Division I colleges, including the University of Rhode Island, Northern Illinois University, the University of Illinois, Western Michigan University, Stanford University, the University of Michigan, and Syracuse University.

=== Early career ===
Shafer began his coaching career as a graduate assistant to Bill Mallory at Indiana University from 1991 to 1992. For the 1991 season, the team finished with a 7 and 4 record with 1 tie. The team also graduated a first round pick in Vaughn Dunbar who was taken 21st overall by the New Orleans Saints in the 1992 NFL draft. Shafer also earned his master's degree from in Education from the university while coaching football. He next coached the secondary at the University of Rhode Island from 1993-1995.

=== Northern Illinois ===
Shafer spent eight years as an assistant coach at Northern Illinois University, the first four as secondary coach, before adding defensive coordinator duties to his resume in 2000. Throughout his career at Northern Illinois, Shafer's players earned 13 All-MAC selections. and the team was ranked among the top three teams in MAC scoring defense in 2002 and 2003. His 2002 unit led the MAC in interceptions, takeaways, scoring defense, run defense and pass sacks. During the 2003 season, Northern Illinois was ranked as high as No. 12 in the AP poll, recorded its first 10-win season in 20 years, and had three victories over BCS teams while holding them to an average of 15 points per game. The team started 7-0 with victories over Maryland, Alabama, and Iowa State. During his time with the Huskie Football Program, Shafer also spent time with the local community including speaking at numerous coaching clinics.

=== Illinois ===
Shafer was hired as the secondary coach at the University of Illinois in 2004, after four straight winning seasons with Northern Illinois. Working with Illinois head coach Ron Turner, Shafer coached cornerback Kelvin Hayden, who led the Big Ten Conference in interceptions and was selected by the Indianapolis Colts in the second round of the NFL Draft. While Shafer was coaching at Illinois, the team's defensive coordinator was former Michigan linebacker, Mike Mallory who also worked with Shafer at Northern Illinois. Mallory noted that Shafer's experience as a quarterback helped him as a defensive coach: "He knows how to get into quarterbacks' heads and what to do to throw them off their game."

=== Western Michigan ===
In December 2004, he was hired by Bill Cubit at Western Michigan University, where he was the defensive coordinator from 2005-2006. Western Michigan was 1-10 the year before Shafer arrived, then went 7-4 in 2005 and 8-5 in 2006. In 2006, the Broncos ranked first in the nation in interceptions (24) and sacks (46), sixth in run defense, seventh in turnover margin and 11th in total defense. The Broncos' rush defense (76.1 yards per game) in 2006 set a MAC record for fewest rushing yards allowed per game. Shafer was a nominee for the Broyles Award as the top assistant coach in the nation. He also coached two players who won the MAC West Division Player of the Week. Ammer Ismail and Dustin Duclo won the award twice in 2005 and Ismail was named to the First-Team All-MAC Defense. In 2005, his defense forced 13 fumbles and intercepted 15 passes.

=== Stanford ===
Jim Harbaugh was hired as the head coach of the Stanford Cardinal in December 2006. As part of his coaching staff, he hired Shafer as the defensive coordinator and assistant head coach. Harbaugh was quoted as saying Shafer being "one of the most creative and innovative defensive minds in college football." While at Stanford, he was part of the Cardinal's October 6, 2007, upset of USC. The Trojans were favored in the game by 41 points but the Cardinal scored a touchdown in the final minute to win the game 24-23. The upset was considered by some to be the greatest upset in the history of college football. Shafer's defense at Stanford ranked fifth in the nation with 37 sacks and posted 101 tackles for loss, which was good for 11th in the country. The numbers were the Cardinal's best since their Rose Bowl season of 1999.

=== Michigan ===
Shafer was hired as the defensive coordinator for the University of Michigan by new head coach Rich Rodriguez in 2008. In Shafer's only season as Michigan's defensive coordinator, the team was ranked 68th in total defense, 87th in pass defense and 80th in scoring defense among all Division I teams, allowing 28.9 points per game. Coach Rich Rodriguez announced on December 16, 2008, that Shafer had resigned after one season as defensive coordinator.

=== Syracuse ===
Shafer was hired by Syracuse University head football coach Doug Marrone in 2009. He was hired as the defensive coordinator for a team that allowed 32.7 points per game in the 2008 season. The defense went from being 101st in the country to the top 20 under Shafer. Under Shafer, Syracuse's defense ranked 7th in the nation in 2010 in total defense (from 37th), 12th in the nation in first downs allowed (from 27th), 10th in pass defense (from 85th), 14th in pass efficiency defense (from (113th), and 13th in scoring defense (from 81st). While at Syracuse, he coached 2012 1st round draft pick Chandler Jones, who was the highest draft pick from Syracuse since Dwight Freeney in 2002. Shafer was officially named the head coach of the Orange on January 9, 2013, after Doug Marrone left to become the head coach of the Buffalo Bills.

=== Middle Tennessee State ===
On January 20, 2017, Shafer was hired by Middle Tennessee State to serve as defensive coordinator under head coach Rick Stockstill.

== Coaching and defensive philosophy ==
Shafer said his father was his greatest coaching role model. He noted: "My dad always said a good coach can coach any position, and a good coach can coach any scheme. We'll come up with an excellent scheme that is simple enough to let the kids attack and play with great aggression." Shafer explained his defensive philosophy this way:

"Scheme is overrated, I've always believed that. What's not overrated is getting your kids to play with great effort, great attitude and great enthusiasm. Those are things we can control on a daily basis, and that will be my primary goal. . . . The philosophy of our defense is attack-oriented, attack and react. We want to be a defense that is multiple, that is always putting pressure and forcing the hand of the offense. We want to be a penetrating defense. If you're going to (ask) what our objectives are? The one thing we want to do is stop the run, force them to throw the ball on first down, create negative plays on first down . . . and get ourselves in position to force them to throw the ball. Get them one-dimensional. We don't want to be a defense that sits back. We want to be a defense that creates turnovers and scores touchdowns."

Similarly, he told the Detroit Free Press:

"We're an attack defense; scheme is overrated. All schemes can work if you tackle and keep the ball in front. We're an aggressive defense, force the offense's hand. We're going to stop the run on early downs and force the pass. We'll get situations where when we are forcing the pass, we hit the quarterback, forcing him to throw the ball into coverage."

Shafer's defense philosophy has also been published to DVD. He is the author of eight instructional videos that are distributed by Coaches Choice and teach lessons such as tackling, press coverage, and different defense packages.

== Family ==
Shafer and his wife Missy have a son, Wolfgang, and a daughter. Wolfgang was a quarterback for the Ithaca College Bombers, and is currently the Special Teams Coordinator/Safeties coach at University of Tennessee at Chattanooga. His brother John is an assistant football coach, and head track and field coach at Cuyahoga Heights High School.

== Head coaching record ==
Year	Team	Overall	Conference	Standing	Bowl/playoffs
Syracuse Orange (Atlantic Coast Conference) (2013–2015)
2013	Syracuse	7–6	4–4	T–3rd (Atlantic)	W Texas
2014	Syracuse	3–9	1–7	T–6th (Atlantic)	
2015	Syracuse	4–8	2–6	5th (Atlantic)	
Syracuse:		14–23	7–17		
Total:		14–23			
