= 2013 Indiana Hoosiers football team =

American college football season

2013 Indiana Hoosiers football
- Conference: Big Ten Conference
- Leaders Division
- Record: 5–7 (3–5 Big Ten)
- Head coach: Kevin Wilson (3rd season)
- Co-offensive coordinators: Kevin Johns (3rd season); Seth Littrell (2nd season)
- Offensive scheme: Multiple
- Co-defensive coordinators: William Inge (1st season); Doug Mallory (3rd season)
- Base defense: 4–3
- MVP: Cody Latimer
- Captains: Ted Bolser; Greg Heban; Kofi Hughes
- Home stadium: Memorial Stadium

2013 Big Ten Conference football standings
	Conf.			Overall
Team	W		L	W		L
Legends Division
No. 3 Michigan State x$	8	–	0	13	–	1
Iowa	5	–	3	8	–	5
Nebraska	5	–	3	9	–	4
Minnesota	4	–	4	8	–	5
Michigan	3	–	5	7	–	6
Northwestern	1	–	7	5	–	7
Leaders Division
No. 12 Ohio State x%	8	–	0	12	–	2
No. 22 Wisconsin	6	–	2	9	–	4
Penn State*	4	–	4	7	–	5
Indiana	3	–	5	5	–	7
Illinois	1	–	7	4	–	8
Purdue	0	–	8	1	–	11
Championship: Michigan State 34, Ohio State 24
$ – BCS representative as conference champion; % – BCS at-large representative; x – Division champion/co-champions; Penn State ineligible for conference championship game and post-season bowl games due to NCAA sanctions; Rankings from AP Poll

The 2013 Indiana Hoosiers football team represented the Indiana University during the 2013 NCAA Division I FBS football season. The Hoosiers played in the Leaders Division of the Big Ten Conference and played their home games at Memorial Stadium in Bloomington, Indiana. The team was led by head coach Kevin Wilson, who was in his third season. They finished the season 5–7, 3–5 in Big Ten play to finish in fourth place in the Leaders Division.

== Preseason ==
=== Recruits ===
College recruiting (2013)
Name	Hometown	School	Height	Weight	40^{‡}	Commit date
Antonio Allen; S	Indianapolis, Indiana	Ben Davis	5 ft 11 in (1.80 m)	195 lb (88 kg)	4.5	Aug 9, 2012
Antonio Allen; S	Recruit ratings: Scout: Rivals: (80)					
Daryl Chestnut; RB	Miami, Florida	Columbus	5 ft 9 in (1.75 m)	190 lb (86 kg)	–	Feb 6, 2013
Daryl Chestnut; RB	Recruit ratings: Scout: Rivals: (77)					
Chris Cormier; DT	Yuma, Arizona	Arizona Western CC	6 ft 2 in (1.88 m)	305 lb (138 kg)	–	Feb 3, 2013
Chris Cormier; DT	Recruit ratings: Scout: Rivals: (JC)					
Patrick Dougherty; DE	Aurora, Ohio	Aurora	6 ft 5 in (1.96 m)	255 lb (116 kg)	5.0	Jul 7, 2012
Patrick Dougherty; DE	Recruit ratings: Scout: Rivals: (69)					
Chase Dutra; ATH	Brownsburg, Indiana	Brownsburg	6 ft 1 in (1.85 m)	195 lb (88 kg)	4.5	Aug 12, 2012
Chase Dutra; ATH	Recruit ratings: Scout: Rivals: (63)					
Rashard Fant; ATH	Fairburn, Georgia	Our Lady of Mercy	5 ft 10 in (1.78 m)	163 lb (74 kg)	4.44	Oct 24, 2012
Rashard Fant; ATH	Recruit ratings: Scout: Rivals: (83)					
Danny Friend; TE	Morris, Illinois	Morris	6 ft 5 in (1.96 m)	238 lb (108 kg)	–	Jan 9, 2012
Danny Friend; TE	Recruit ratings: Scout: Rivals: (71)					
Steven Funderburk; ILB	Council Bluffs, Iowa	Iowa Western CC	6 ft 2 in (1.88 m)	225 lb (102 kg)	–	Dec 11, 2012
Steven Funderburk; ILB	Recruit ratings: Scout: Rivals: (JC)					
Myles Graham; RB	Hollywood, Florida	Chaminade Madonna	6 ft 0 in (1.83 m)	200 lb (91 kg)	–	Aug 8, 2012
Myles Graham; RB	Recruit ratings: Scout: Rivals: (67)					
Isaac Griffith; WR	Ft. Wayne, Indiana	Homestead	6 ft 0 in (1.83 m)	183 lb (83 kg)	4.5	Jun 11, 2012
Isaac Griffith; WR	Recruit ratings: Scout: Rivals: (77)					
Jordan Heiderman; DT	Council Bluffs, Iowa	Iowa Western CC	6 ft 3 in (1.91 m)	280 lb (130 kg)	–	Sep 11, 2012
Jordan Heiderman; DT	Recruit ratings: Scout: Rivals: (69)					
Evan Jansen; TE	Cincinnati, Ohio	Moeller	6 ft 5 in (1.96 m)	233 lb (106 kg)	–	Jul 3, 2012
Evan Jansen; TE	Recruit ratings: Scout: Rivals: (70)					
David Kenney; DE	Indianapolis, Indiana	Pike	6 ft 2 in (1.88 m)	253 lb (115 kg)	4.9	Oct 21, 2012
David Kenney; DE	Recruit ratings: Scout: Rivals: (80)					
Darius Latham; DT	Indianapolis, Indiana	North Central	6 ft 5 in (1.96 m)	288 lb (131 kg)	5.3	Nov 25, 2012
Darius Latham; DT	Recruit ratings: Scout: Rivals: (82)					
Clyde Newton; OLB	Punta Gorda, Florida	Charlotte	6 ft 1 in (1.85 m)	205 lb (93 kg)	4.6	Oct 24, 2012
Clyde Newton; OLB	Recruit ratings: Scout: Rivals: (75)					
Marcus Oliver; ILB	Hamilton, Ohio	Hamilton	6 ft 1 in (1.85 m)	220 lb (100 kg)	4.6	Dec 6, 2012
Marcus Oliver; ILB	Recruit ratings: Scout: Rivals: (71)					
Noel Padmore; CB	Flowery Branch, Georgia	Flowery Branch	5 ft 11 in (1.80 m)	170 lb (77 kg)	–	Dec 15, 2012
Noel Padmore; CB	Recruit ratings: Scout: Rivals: (78)					
T.J. Simmons; ILB	Lakeland, Florida	Lakeland	6 ft 0 in (1.83 m)	225 lb (102 kg)	–	Dec 2, 2012
T.J. Simmons; ILB	Recruit ratings: Scout: Rivals: (74)					
Kristopher Smith; OLB	Flowery Branch, Georgia	Flowery Branch	6 ft 3 in (1.91 m)	205 lb (93 kg)	4.55	Dec 10, 2012
Kristopher Smith; OLB	Recruit ratings: Scout: Rivals: (80)					
Laray Smith; RB	Brooklyn, New York	Xaverian	6 ft 1 in (1.85 m)	180 lb (82 kg)	4.5	Feb 6, 2013
Laray Smith; RB	Recruit ratings: Scout: Rivals: (75)					
Maurice Swain; OT	LaGrange, Georgia	Troup	6 ft 6 in (1.98 m)	298 lb (135 kg)	–	Feb 6, 2013
Maurice Swain; OT	Recruit ratings: Scout: Rivals: (77)					
Taj Williams; WR	Tallahassee, Florida	Lincoln	6 ft 4 in (1.93 m)	166 lb (75 kg)	4.4	Mar 4, 2013
Taj Williams; WR	Recruit ratings: Scout: Rivals: (83)					
Anthony Young; WR	Lakewood, Ohio	St. Edward	6 ft 0 in (1.83 m)	170 lb (77 kg)	–	Sep 22, 2012
Anthony Young; WR	Recruit ratings: Scout: Rivals: (71)					
Overall recruit ranking: Scout: 49 Rivals: 38 ESPN: 44
Note: In many cases, Scout, Rivals, 247Sports, On3, and ESPN may conflict in their listings of height and weight.; In these cases, the average was taken. ESPN grades are on a 100-point scale.; Sources: "Indiana Football Commitments". Rivals.; "2013 Indiana Football Commits". Scout.; "ESPN". ESPN.; "Scout.com Team Recruiting Rankings". Scout.; "2013 Team Ranking". Rivals.com.

== Schedule ==
Date	Time	Opponent	Site	TV	Result	Attendance
August 29	7:00 pm	Indiana State*	Memorial Stadium; Bloomington, IN	BTN	W 73–35	40,278
September 7	6:00 pm	Navy*	Memorial Stadium; Bloomington, IN	BTN	L 35–41	47,013
September 14	12:00 pm	Bowling Green*	Memorial Stadium; Bloomington, IN	ESPNU	W 42–10	41,869
September 21	8:00 pm	Missouri*	Memorial Stadium; Bloomington, IN	BTN	L 28–45	49,149
October 5	12:00 pm	Penn State	Memorial Stadium; Bloomington, IN	BTN	W 44–24	42,125
October 12	12:00 pm	at Michigan State	Spartan Stadium; East Lansing, MI (rivalry)	ESPN2	L 28–42	73,815
October 19	3:30 pm	at Michigan	Michigan Stadium; Ann Arbor, MI	BTN	L 47–63	109,503
November 2	3:30 pm	Minnesota^{†}	Memorial Stadium; Bloomington, IN	BTN	L 39–42	44,625
November 9	3:30 pm	Illinois	Memorial Stadium; Bloomington, IN (rivalry)	BTN	W 52–35	44,882
November 16	12:00 pm	at No. 17 Wisconsin	Camp Randall Stadium; Madison, WI	ESPN2	L 3–51	77,849
November 23	3:30 pm	at No. 4 Ohio State	Ohio Stadium; Columbus, OH	ABC/ESPN2	L 14–42	104,990
November 30	3:30 pm	Purdue	Memorial Stadium; Bloomington, IN (Old Oaken Bucket)	BTN	W 56–36	44,882
*Non-conference game; ^{†}Homecoming; Rankings from AP Poll released prior to the game; All times are in Eastern time

== Personnel ==
=== Coaching staff ===
Name	Position	Seasons at Indiana	Alma mater
Kevin Wilson	Head coach	3rd	North Carolina (1984)
Doug Mallory	Asst. Head Coach, Defensive coordinator, S	3rd	Michigan (1988)
William Inge	Co-Defensive coordinator, LB	1st	Iowa (1996, M.S. '99)
Seth Littrell	Offensive coordinator, TE & FB	2nd	Oklahoma (2000)
Jon Fabris	Defensive Line	2nd	Ole Miss (1980)
Greg Frey	Run Game Coordinator, OL	3rd	Florida State (1996)
James Patton	Recruiting & Special Teams Coordinator, Asst. DL	1st	Miami (OH) (1993, M.S. '95)
Kevin Johns	Co-Offensive Coordinator, QB & WR	3rd	Dayton (1998)
Deland McCullough	Running Backs	3rd	Miami (OH) (1996)
Brandon Shelby	Cornerbacks	3rd	Oklahoma (2004, M.S. '05)
Mark Hill	Head Strength & Conditioning Coach	3rd	UT-Chattanooga (1999)

=== Roster ===
2013 Indiana Hoosiers football team roster
Players
Coaches
Offense

Pos.	#	Name	Class
WR	1	Shane Wynn	Jr
QB	2	Cameron Coffman	Jr
WR	3	Cody Latimer	Jr
QB	5	Tre Roberson	So
RB	6	Tevin Coleman	So
QB	7	Nate Sudfeld	So
WR	8	Kevin Davis	Fr
QB	9	Nate Boudreau	Fr
WR	10	Ricky Jones	Fr
RB	12	Stephen Houston	Sr
WR	13	Kofi Hughes (C)	Sr
WR	14	Nick Stoner	Jr
WR	15	Isaiah Roundtree	Jr
QB	16	Tyler Brady	Fr
QB	17	Max Matthews	So
WR	17	Isaac Griffith	Fr
RB	20	D'Angelo Roberts	Jr
WR	21	Damon Graham	So
RB	23	Laray Smith	Fr
WR	23	Ty Smith	Fr
WR	26	Chandler Miller	Fr
WR	27	Andre Booker	So
RB	28	Anthony Davis	So
TE	29	Jordan Jackson	So
TE	33	Christian Englum	Fr
RB	35	Bobby Hess	Fr
RB	36	Myles Graham	Fr
RB	39	Nick Turner	Sr
FB	40	Matt Zakrzewski	Jr
RB	44	Andrew Wilson	So
C	50	Jake Reed	So
OT	57	Pete Bachman	Jr
OT	59	Peyton Eckert	Jr
OT	62	Ralston Evans	So
OL	63	Tyler Lukens	So
C	64	Collin Rahrig	Jr
OL	65	Wes Rogers	Fr
OL	67	Dan Feeney	So
OL	68	David Kaminiski	So
OL	70	Jacob Bailey	Fr
OT	71	Bill Ivan	Jr
OL	73	Bernard Taylor	Jr
OL	75	Chase Alexander	Fr
OL	76	Cody Evers	Jr
OT	77	Dimitric Camiel	Fr
OT	78	Jason Spriggs	So
WR	80	Anthony Young	Fr
WR	81	Duwyce Wilson	Sr
WR	82	Caleb Cornett	Fr
WR	87	Mitchell Paige	Fr
TE	80	Sean Damaska	Fr
TE	83	Ted Bolser (C)	Sr
TE	84	Danny Friend	Fr
TE	85	Evan Jansen	Fr
TE	86	Paul Phillips	Jr
TE	88	Anthony Corsaro	So

Defense

Pos.	#	Name	Class
LB	2	T.J. Simmons	Fr
CB	3	Arthur Jones	Fr
LB	4	Forisse Hardin	Jr
CB	5	Noel Padmore	Fr
CB	7	Brian Williams	Jr
CB	9	Greg Heban (C)	Sr
CB	16	Rashard Fant	Fr
CB	17	Michael Hunter	So
CB	18	Tregg Waters	Sr
CB	19	Ryan Thompson	Sr
S	21	Jake Zupancic	Jr
CB	24	Tim Bennett	Jr
DE	25	Ryan Phillis	Jr
S	26	Justin Nowak	Jr
LB	27	Steven Funderburk	Jr
CB	28	Antonio Marshall	Sr
S	29	Dawson Fletcher	So
S	30	Chase Dutra	Fr
LB	31	Jordan Wallace	Fr
DE	33	Zach Shaw	So
LB	34	Jacarri Alexander	Sr
LB	35	Kris Smith	Fr
S	37	Mark Murphy	Jr
S	38	Garrett Welch	Fr
S	40	Antonio Allen	Fr
LB	41	Clyde Newton	Fr
LB	42	David Cooper	Jr
S	43	Brandon Grubbe	Jr
LB	44	Marcus Oliver	Fr
LB	45	Tony Thomas	Fr
DE	46	Mike Replogle	Jr
LB	47	Chase Hoobler	Jr
LB	48	Simeon Ikudabo	So
LB	49	Griffen Dahlstrom	Sr
LB	51	Kyle Kennedy	So
LB	52	Tyler Burgett	Fr
DE	53	Shawn Heffern	Fr
LB	55	Jake Michalek	Jr
DE	56	Nick Mangieri	So
DT	58	Patrick Dougherty	Fr
LB	60	Liam Duddy	Fr
DT	69	Alex Todd	So
DE	71	Levik Salluom	Fr
DE	72	Ben Polk	Fr
DT	74	Nate Hoff	Fr
DE	82	Jordan Taylor	Fr
DT	87	Leneil Himes	Jr
DE	90	David Kenney	Fr
DT	92	Christopher Cormier	Jr
DT	93	Ralphael Green	Fr
DL	95	Bobby Richardson	Jr
DE	96	John Laihinen	Jr
DT	97	Jordan Heiderman	Jr
DT	98	Darius Latham	Fr
DT	99	Adarius Rayner	So

Special teams

Pos.	#	Name	Class
K	16	Mitch Ewald	Sr
P	36	Erich Toth	So
LS	66	Josh Pericht	Fr
K	90	Aaron Del Grosso	Fr
LS	91	Matt Dooley	Jr
K	92	Griffin Oakes	Fr
P	93	Nick Campos	Fr
K	99	Dong Kim	Fr

Head coach

- Kevin R. Wilson

Coordinators/assistant coaches

- Kevin Johns (Offensive Coordinator / Quarterbacks / Wide Receivers)
- Doug Mallory (Defensive coordinator / Defensive Ends / Outside Linebackers)
- Seth Litrell (Co-Offensive Coordinator / Offensive Line)
- William Inge (Co-Defensive coordinator / Linebackers)
- Deland McCullough (Running Backs)
- Jon Fabris (Defensive Line)
- Greg Frey (Run Game Coordinator, Offensive Line)
- James Patton (Recruiting & Special Teams Coordinator/Assistant DL)
- Brandon Shelby (Cornerbacks)
- Mark Hill (Head Strength and Conditioning Coach)
- Ryan Stanchek (Offensive Graduate Assistant)
- Carter Whitson (Offensive Graduate Assistant)
- Elliott Wratten (Defensive Graduate Assistant)
- Billy Ray Johnson (Assistant AD for Football Administration)
- Herb Haygood (Associate Director of Player Personnel)

Legend

- (C) Team captain
- (S) Suspended
- (I) Ineligible
- Injured
- Redshirt

== 2014 NFL draftees ==
Player	Round	Pick	Position	NFL club
Cody Latimer	2	24	Wide receiver	Denver Broncos
Ted Bolser	7	2	Tight end	Washington Redskins
