= Mike Sanford =

Mike Sanford may refer to:

- Mike Sanford Sr. (born 1955), American football coach
- Mike Sanford Jr. (born 1982), American football coach
- Mike Sanford (sprinter) (born 1960), American sprinter, winner of the 1980 4 × 100 meter relay at the NCAA Division I Outdoor Track and Field Championships
