= 2022 Colorado Buffaloes football team =

American college football season

2022 Colorado Buffaloes football
- Conference: Pac-12 Conference
- Record: 1–11 (1–8 Pac-12)
- Head coach: Karl Dorrell (3rd season; first five games); Mike Sanford Jr. (interim; remainder of season)
- Offensive coordinator: Mike Sanford Jr. (1st season; first five games); Clay Patterson (interim; remainder of season)
- Offensive scheme: Multiple
- Defensive coordinator: Chris Wilson (2nd season; first five games); Gerald Chatman (interim; remainder of season)
- Base defense: 4–3
- Home stadium: Folsom Field

Uniform
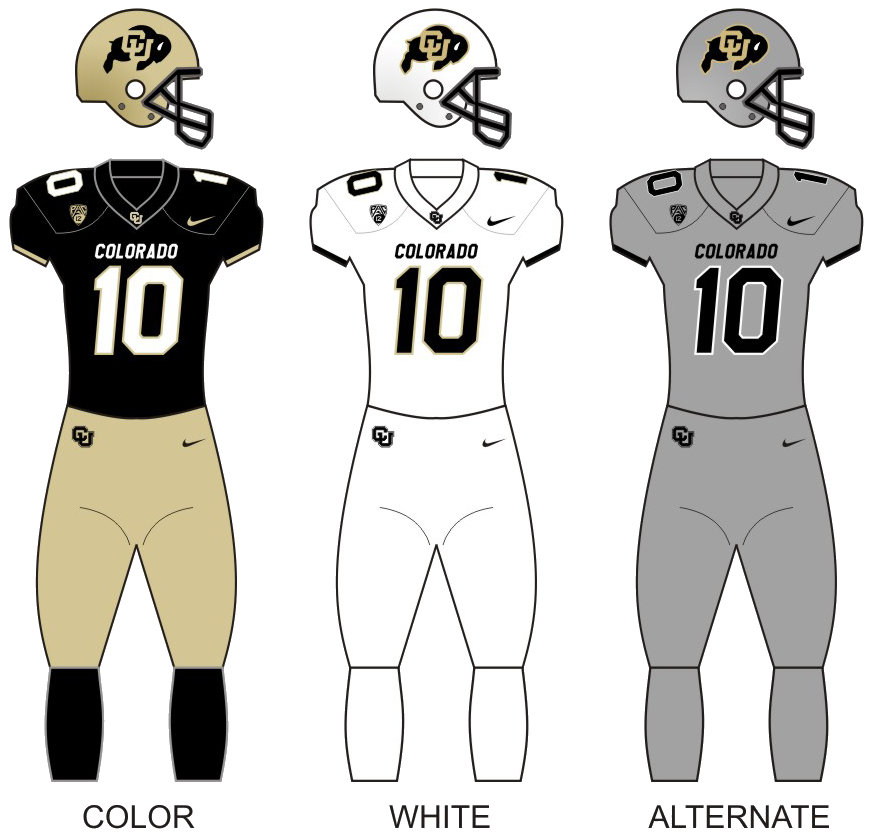

2022 Pac-12 Conference football standings
	Conf.			Overall
Team	W		L	W		L
No. 12 USC y	8	–	1	11	–	3
No. 10 Utah y$	7	–	2	10	–	4
No. 8 Washington	7	–	2	11	–	2
No. 15 Oregon	7	–	2	10	–	3
No. 17 Oregon State	6	–	3	10	–	3
No. 21 UCLA	6	–	3	9	–	4
Washington State	4	–	5	7	–	6
Arizona	3	–	6	5	–	7
California	2	–	7	4	–	8
Arizona State†	1	–	7	1	–	9
Stanford	1	–	8	3	–	9
Colorado	1	–	8	1	–	11
Championship: Utah 47, USC 24
$ – Conference champion; y – Championship game participant; Rankings from AP Poll

The 2022 Colorado Buffaloes football team represented the University of Colorado Boulder as a member of the Pac-12 Conference during the 2022 NCAA Division I FBS football season. The Buffaloes played their home games on campus at Folsom Field in Boulder, Colorado. After losing the first five games of the season, third-year head coach Karl Dorrell and defensive coordinator Chris Wilson were fired on October 2; offensive coordinator Mike Sanford Jr. was named the interim head coach of the Buffaloes for the remainder of the season, who named Clay Patterson as the offensive coordinator and Gerald Chatman as the defensive coordinator.

The Buffaloes finished the season with only one win over California in overtime, their first one-win season since 2012 and their fourth since 1917. This was one of the worst seasons in program history as Colorado lost all but three games by at least 25 points.

After the season on December 3, Deion Sanders was hired as the head coach for 2023. A Hall of Fame cornerback in the National Football League (NFL), he was previously the head coach for three years at Jackson State of the Southwestern Athletic Conference (SWAC).

== Schedule ==
The Colorado Buffaloes and the Pac-12 announced the 2022 football schedule on December 16, 2021.

Date	Time	Opponent	Site	TV	Result	Attendance
September 2	8:00 p.m.	TCU*	Folsom Field; Boulder, CO	ESPN	L 13–38	47,868
September 10	1:30 p.m.	at Air Force*	Falcon Stadium; Colorado Springs, CO	CBS	L 10–41	33,647
September 17	1:30 p.m.	at Minnesota*	Huntington Bank Stadium; Minneapolis, MN	ESPN2	L 7–49	42,101
September 24	12:00 p.m.	UCLA	Folsom Field; Boulder, CO	P12N	L 17–45	42,848
October 1	7:30 p.m.	at Arizona	Arizona Stadium; Tucson, AZ	P12N	L 20–43	36,591
October 15	12:00 p.m.	California	Folsom Field; Boulder, CO	P12N	W 20–13 ^{OT}	50,471
October 22	6:00 p.m.	at Oregon State	Reser Stadium; Corvallis, OR	P12N	L 9–42	27,679
October 29	5:30 p.m.	Arizona State^{†}	Folsom Field; Boulder, CO	ESPNU	L 34–42	40,334
November 5	1:30 p.m.	No. 8 Oregon	Folsom Field; Boulder, CO	ESPN	L 10–49	42,089
November 11	7:30 p.m.	at No. 8 USC	Los Angeles Memorial Coliseum; Los Angeles, CA	FS1	L 17–55	61,206
November 19	6:00 p.m.	at No. 17 Washington	Husky Stadium; Seattle, WA	P12N	L 7–54	67,969
November 26	2:00 p.m.	No. 14 Utah	Folsom Field; Boulder, CO (Rumble in the Rockies)	P12N	L 21–63	33,474
*Non-conference game; ^{†}Homecoming; Rankings from AP Poll (and CFP Rankings, after November 1) - Released prior to game; All times are in Mountain time

== Roster ==
2022 Colorado Buffaloes football team roster
Players
Coaches
Offense

Pos.	#	Name	Class
RB	0	Victor Venn	Fr
WR	1	Montana Lemonious-Craig	So
WR	2	R. J. Sneed II	GS
WR	3	Chase Penry	So
WR	4	Jordyn Tyson	Fr
QB	5	J. T. Shrout	So
WR	6	Daniel Arias	Sr
QB	7	Owen McCown	Fr
RB	8	Alex Fontenot	Sr
QB	8	Oakie Salave'a	Fr
QB	9	Drew Carter	So
WR	10	Jaylon Jackson	Sr
WR	13	Maurice Bell	Sr
QB	14	Maddox Kopp	Fr
WR	15	Chase Sowell	Fr
QB	16	Colton Allen	Fr
TE	18	Caleb Fauria	Fr
RB	20	Deion Smith	Jr
RB	21	Jayle Stacks	So
RB	22	Anthony Hankerson	Fr
WR	23	Grant Page	Fr
WR	25	Jack Hestera	Fr
RB	27	Dominick Mastro	So
RB	33	Christian Sarem	Fr
TE	38	Brady Russell	Sr
RB	44	Charlie Offerdahl	Fr
OL	51	Jack Seavall	So
OL	52	Luke Eckardt	Fr
OL	53	Noah Fenske	So
OL	55	Van Wells	Fr
OL	56	Jackson Anderson	Fr
OL	60	Jake Wiley	So
OL	64	Austin Johnson	So
OT	65	Alex Harkey	So
OL	68	Edgar Amaya	Fr
OL	69	Gerad Christian-Lichtenhan	So
OL	70	Casey Roddick	Jr
OT	72	Travis Gray	Fr
OL	73	Ben Reznik	Fr
OL	74	John Ramirez	Fr
OT	75	Tommy Brown	GS
OL	76	Frank Fillip	Jr
OT	77	Carter Edwards	Fr
OL	79	Camden Dempsey	Fr
WR	80	Ty Robinson	So
WR	81	Chernet Estes	Fr
TE	82	Austin Smith	Fr
WR	83	Michael Harrison	So
WR	84	Cole Boscia	Fr
TE	86	Zach Courtney	Fr
TE	87	Erik Olsen	Fr
TE	88	Brady Kopetz	Fr
TE	89	Louis Passarello	Fr

Defense

Pos.	#	Name	Class
CB	0	Kaylin Moore	So
OLB	1	Guy Thomas	Sr
S	2	Jaylen Striker	Jr
S	3	Jeremy Mack Jr.	So
OLB	4	Jamar Montgomery	Sr
S	5	Tyrin Taylor	So
CB	6	Nikko Reed	So
ILB	7	Marvin Ham II	So
ILB	8	Josh Chandler-Semedo	GS
S	9	Dylan Dixson	Fr
OLB	10	Eoghan Kerry	Fr
ILB	12	Quinn Perry	Sr
DL	13	Justin Jackson	Sr
CB	15	Simeon Harris	Fr
S	16	Jordan Woolverton	Fr
S	17	Xavier Smith	Fr
ILB	20	Robert Barnes	GS
CB	21	Joshua Wiggins	Fr
CB	22	Toren Pittman	So
S	23	Isaiah Lewis	Sr
CB	25	Keyshon Mills	Fr
CB	26	Jason Oliver	Fr
CB	27	Nigel Bethel Jr.	Jr
OLB	28	Ben Finneseth	Fr
ILB	29	Isaac Hurtado	So
CB	30	Braden Keith	Fr
LB	31	Caiden Robertson	So
ILB	32	Aubrey Smith	Fr
OLB	33	Joshka Gustav	So
DB	34	Dante Capolungo	Fr
ILB	35	Mister Williams	Fr
S	37	Trey Ortega III	So
CB	38	Mac Willis	So
S	39	Austin Dahlke	Fr
OLB	40	Shakaun Bowser	Fr
S	41	Anthony Lyle	Sr
CB	42	Liam McGannon	Fr
S	43	Trevor Woods	So
OLB	44	Devin Grant	Fr
OLB	47	Kaden Ludwick	Fr
OLB	48	Zion Magalei	Fr
ILB	51	Thomas Notarainni	Fr
LB	52	Jack Remington	Fr
DE	54	Terrance Lang	Sr
DL	56	Mason Maddox	Fr
DE	90	Chance Main	GS
DL	91	Na'im Rodman	Jr
DL	92	Aaron Austin	Fr
DL	93	Ryan Williams	Fr
DL	95	Tyas Martin	Fr
DL	97	Allan Baugh	Fr
DL	99	Jalen Sami	Jr

Special teams

Pos.	#	Name	Class
K	36	Cole Becker	So
P	45	Noah Hubbard	Fr
P	49	Trent Carrizosa	Fr
LS	57	Cameron Warchuk	Fr
LS	85	Derek Bedell	So
K	98	Cristiano Palazzo	Fr

Head coach

- Karl Dorrell
  3rd season as HC
  Dismissed on Oct. 2
- Mike Sanford Jr.
  1st season as interim HC

Coordinators/assistant coaches

- Mike Sanford Jr. – Offensive coordinator/quarterbacks (until Oct. 2)
- Phil McGeoghan – Assistant head coach/wide receivers (until Oct.2)
- Chris Wilson – Defensive coordinator/defensive line (until Oct. 2)
- Gerald Chatman – Defensive coordinator/defensive line (until Oct.2)
- Clay Patterson – Offensive coordinator/tight ends (until Oct.2)
- Chris Reinert – Special teams coordinator
- Kyle DeVan – Offensive line/run game coordinator
- Brett Maxie – Safeties/defensive pass game coordinator
- Mark Smith – Inside linebackers/recruiting coordinator
- Rod Chance – Cornerbacks
- Darian Hagan – Running backs
- Jeff Smart – Linebackers
- Shannon Turley – Director, strength and conditioning
- Connor Gorny – Assistant, strength and conditioning
- Darius Reese – Assistant, strength and conditioning
- Jacob Ricketts – Assistant, strength and conditioning
- Scott Sacuskie – Assistant, strength and conditioning
- Brandon Gibson – Quality control, offense
- Nicholas Gilbert – Quality control, offense
- Michael Downing – Quality control, defense
- Nate Dodson – Graduate assistant
- John Gardner – Graduate assistant
- Cordale Grundy – Graduate assistant
- Kolter Smith – Graduate assistant'
- Bryan McGinnis – Director, football operations
- Emily Funke – Assistant director of football operations
- Chandler Dorrell – Director, player personnel

Legend

- (C) Team captain
- (S) Suspended
- (I) Ineligible
- Injured
- Redshirt

Roster
Last update: 11/6/22

== Game summaries ==
=== vs TCU ===
TCU Horned Frogs (0–0) vs Colorado Buffaloes (0–0) – Game summary

Quarter	1	2	3	4	Total
Horned Frogs	0	7	10	21	38
Buffaloes	3	3	0	7	13

at Folsom Field • Boulder, CO

- Date: September 2, 2022
- Game time: 8:00 p.m.
- Game weather: Sunny, 73 °F (23 °C)
- Game attendance: 47,868
- Referee: Matt Richards
- TV announcers (ESPN): Brian Custer (play-by-play), Dustin Fox (analyst), Taylor McGregor (sideline)

Game information

First quarter

- (4:44) COL – Cole Becker 37-yard field goal (Drive: 9 plays, 43 yards, 4:37; Colorado 3–0)

Second quarter

- (14:36) TCU – Derius Davis 60-yard punt return, Griffin Kell kick (Drive: 6 plays, 11 yards, 3:16; TCU 7–3)
- (7:38) COL – Cole Becker 43-yard field goal (Drive: 12 plays, 50 yards, 6:58; TCU 7–6)

Third quarter

- (11:56) TCU – Emari Demercado 43-yard run, Griffin Kell kick (Drive: 5 plays, 75 yards, 3:04; TCU 14–6)
- (3:45) TCU – Griffin Kell 33-yard field goal (Drive: 12 plays, 55 yards, 6:35; TCU 17–6)

Fourth quarter

- (10:55) TCU – Kendre Miller 3-yard run, Griffin Kell kick (Drive: 10 plays, 80 yards, 4:23; TCU 24–6)
- (7:55) TCU – Derius Davis 27-yard run, Griffin Kell kick (Drive: 2 plays, 32 yards, 0:50; TCU 31–6)
- (3:15) TCU – Sam Jackson 7-yard run, Griffin Kell kick (Drive: 5 plays, 81 yards, 2:45; TCU 38–6)
- (1:13) COL – Jordyn Tyson 23-yard pass from J. T. Shrout, Cole Becker kick (Drive: 8 plays, 75 yards, 2:02; TCU 38–13)

Statistics	TCU	COL
First downs	17	20
Total yards	413	348
Rushes/yards	30–275	29–113
Passing yards	138	235
Passing: Comp–Att–Int	15–23–0	26–41–0
Time of possession	26:42	33:18

Team	Category	Player	Statistics
TCU	Passing	Chandler Morris	13/20, 111 yards
TCU	Rushing	Kendre Miller	8 carries, 52 yards, TD
TCU	Receiving	Savion Williams	3 receptions, 31 yards
Colorado	Passing	J. T. Shrout	13/21, 157 yards, TD
Colorado	Rushing	Brendon Lewis	8 carries, 42 yards
Colorado	Receiving	Daniel Arias	4 receptions, 66 yards

=== at Air Force ===
Colorado Buffaloes (0–1) at Air Force Falcons (1–0) – Game summary

Quarter	1	2	3	4	Total
Buffaloes	0	10	0	0	10
Falcons	13	7	7	14	41

at Falcon Stadium • Air Force Academy, CO

- Date: September 10, 2022
- Game time: 1:30 p.m.
- Game weather: Cloudy, 55 °F (13 °C)
- Game attendance: 33,647
- Referee: Mike McCabe
- TV announcers (CBS): Rich Waltz (play-by-play), Aaron Taylor (analyst), Sherree Burch (sideline)

Game information

First quarter

- (14:27) AFA – Brad Roberts 14-yard run, Matthew Dapore kick (Drive: 1 play, 14 yards, 0:04; Air Force 7–0)
- (9:42) AFA – Matthew Dapore 54-yard field goal (Drive: 7 plays, 29 yards, 3:41; Air Force 10–0)
- (0:17) AFA – Matthew Dapore 47-yard field goal (Drive: 7 plays, 33 yards, 3:04; Air Force 13–0)

Second quarter

- (12:55) AFA – Brad Roberts 20-yard run, Matthew Dapore kick (Drive: 4 plays, 35 yards, 1:55; Air Force 20–0)
- (10:55) COL – Deion Smith 25-yard run, Cole Becker kick (Drive: 4 plays, 71 yards, 2:00; Air Force 20–7)
- (0:41) COL – Cole Becker 41-yard field goal (Drive: 4 plays, 0 yards, 1:15; Air Force 20–10)

Third quarter

- (2:31) AFA – Haaziq Daniels 1-yard run, Anthony Rodriguez kick (Drive: 9 plays, 69 yards, 4:34; Air Force 27–10)

Fourth quarter

- (11:12) AFA – Brad Roberts 46-yard run, Anthony Rodriguez kick (Drive: 1 play, 46 yards, 0:12; Air Force 34–10)
- (3:03) AFA – John Lee Eldridge III 11-yard run, Anthony Rodriguez kick (Drive: 12 plays, 68 yards, 7:03; Air Force 41–10)

Statistics	COL	AFA
First downs	8	25
Total yards	162	443
Rushes/yards	32–111	70–435
Passing yards	51	8
Passing: Comp–Att–Int	5–21–1	1–5–0
Time of possession	21:38	38:22

Team	Category	Player	Statistics
Colorado	Passing	J. T. Shrout	5/21, 51 yards, INT
Colorado	Rushing	Deion Smith	11 carries, 59 yards, TD
Colorado	Receiving	Daniel Arias	2 receptions, 36 yards
Air Force	Passing	Haaziq Daniels	1/5, 8 yards
Air Force	Rushing	Brad Roberts	24 carries, 174 yards, 3 TD
Air Force	Receiving	Dane Kinamon	1 reception, 8 yards

=== at Minnesota ===
Colorado Buffaloes (0–2) at Minnesota Golden Gophers (2–0) – Game summary

Quarter	1	2	3	4	Total
Buffaloes	0	0	0	7	7
Golden Gophers	14	21	7	7	49

at Huntington Bank Stadium • Minneapolis, MN

- Date: September 17, 2022
- Game time: 2:30 p.m. CST
- Game weather: Partly cloudy, 77 °F (25 °C)
- Game attendance: 42,101
- Referee: Ron Snodgrass
- TV announcers (ESPN): Beth Mowins (play-by-play), Kirk Morrison (analyst), Stormy Buonantony (sideline)

Game information

First quarter

- (9:32) MINN – Mohamed Ibrahim 5-yard run, Matthew Trickett kick (Drive: 9 plays, 75 yards, 5:28; Minnesota 7–0)
- (8:44) MINN – Mohamed Ibrahim 2-yard run, Matthew Trickett kick (Drive: 2 plays, 11 yards, 0:42; Minnesota 14–0)

Second quarter

- (9:08) MINN – Mohamed Ibrahim 18-yard run, Matthew Trickett kick (Drive: 8 plays, 57 yards, 5:00; Minnesota 21–0)
- (1:37) MINN – Chris Autman-Bell 39-yard pass from Tanner Morgan, Matthew Trickett kick (Drive: 8 plays, 91 yards, 3:08; Minnesota 28–0)
- (0:08) MINN – Dylan Wright 16-yard pass from Tanner Morgan, Matthew Trickett kick (Drive: 8 plays, 53 yards, 0:57; Minnesota 35–0)

Third quarter

- (3:46) MINN – Clay Geary 8-yard pass from Tanner Morgan, Matthew Trickett kick (Drive: 10 plays, 60 yards, 6:29; Minnesota 42–0)

Fourth quarter

- (14:14) MINN – Bryce Williams 22-yard run, Matthew Trickett kick (Drive: 5 plays, 67 yards, 2:30; Minnesota 49–0)
- (8:55) COL – Austin Smith 4-yard pass from J. T. Shrout, Cole Becker kick (Drive: 10 plays, 75 yards, 5:19; Minnesota 49–7)

Statistics	COL	MINN
First downs	14	29
Total yards	226	500
Rushes/yards	34–136	52–334
Passing yards	90	166
Passing: Comp–Att–Int	10–24–0	12–20–1
Time of possession	23:53	36:07

Team	Category	Player	Statistics
Colorado	Passing	Owen McCown	4/7, 52 yards
Colorado	Rushing	Deion Smith	10 carries, 70 yards
Colorado	Receiving	Jaylon Jackson	1 reception, 28 yards
Minnesota	Passing	Tanner Morgan	11/16, 157 yards, 3 TD, INT
Minnesota	Rushing	Mohamed Ibrahim	23 carries, 202 yards, 3 TD
Minnesota	Receiving	Chris Autman-Bell	3 receptions, 58 yards, TD

=== vs UCLA ===
UCLA Bruins (3–0) vs Colorado Buffaloes (0–3) – Game summary

Quarter	1	2	3	4	Total
Bruins	14	7	17	7	45
Buffaloes	0	10	0	7	17

at Folsom Field • Boulder, CO

- Date: September 24, 2022
- Game time: 12:00 p.m.
- Game weather: Sunny, 72 °F (22 °C)
- Game attendance: 42,848
- Referee: Michael Mothershed
- TV announcers (Pac-12 Network): Roxy Bernstein (play-by-play), Lincoln Kennedy (analyst)

Game information

First quarter

- (6:18) UCLA – Matt Sykes 24-yard pass from Dorian Thompson-Robinson, Nicholas Barr-Mira kick (Drive: 6 plays, 64 yards, 2:37; UCLA 7–0)
- (0:46) UCLA – Zach Charbonnet 35-yard run, Nicholas Barr-Mira kick (Drive: 7 plays, 95 yards, 1:46; UCLA 14–0)

Second quarter

- (12:12) COL – Cole Becker 35-yard field goal (Drive: 10 plays, 58 yards, 3:34; UCLA 14–3)
- (9:00) UCLA – Zach Charbonnet 13-yard run, Nicholas Barr-Mira kick (Drive: 7 plays, 75 yards, 3:12; UCLA 21–3)
- (0:19) COL – Owen McCown 2-yard run, Cole Becker kick (Drive: 9 plays, 74 yards, 3:38; UCLA 21–10)

Third quarter

- (13:23) UCLA – Zach Charbonnet 46-yard run, Nicholas Barr-Mira kick (Drive: 4 plays, 75 yards, 1:37; UCLA 28–10)
- (7:48) UCLA – Nicholas Barr-Mira 44-yard field goal (Drive: 4 plays, 5 yards, 1:18; UCLA 31–10)
- (6:03) UCLA – Colson Yankoff 2-yard pass from Dorian Thompson-Robinson, Nicholas Barr-Mira kick (Drive: 2 plays, 30 yards, 0:48; UCLA 38–10)

Fourth quarter

- (14:56) UCLA – Colson Yankoff 3-yard pass from Ethan Garbers, Joseph Firebaugh Jr. kick (Drive: 5 plays, 39 yards, 1:06; UCLA 45–10)
- (2:59) COL – Jordyn Tyson 8-yard pass from Owen McCown, Cole Becker kick (Drive: 14 plays, 85 yards, 6:36; UCLA 45–17)

Statistics	UCLA	COL
First downs	25	19
Total yards	515	309
Rushes/yards	34–249	34–51
Passing yards	266	258
Passing: Comp–Att–Int	22–29–0	26–42–1
Time of possession	25:53	34:07

Team	Category	Player	Statistics
UCLA	Passing	Dorian Thompson-Robinson	19/23, 234 yards, 2 TD
UCLA	Rushing	Zach Charbonnet	9 carries, 104 yards, 3 TD
UCLA	Receiving	Jake Bobo	4 receptions, 53 yards
Colorado	Passing	Owen McCown	26/42, 258 yards, TD, INT
Colorado	Rushing	Charlie Offerdahl	14 carries, 47 yards
Colorado	Receiving	Daniel Arias	4 receptions, 82 yards

=== at Arizona ===
Colorado Buffaloes (0–4) at Arizona Wildcats (2–2) – Game summary

Quarter	1	2	3	4	Total
Buffaloes	7	6	7	0	20
Wildcats	13	13	10	7	43

at Arizona Stadium • Tucson, AZ

- Date: October 1, 2022
- Game time: 6:30 p.m. PST
- Game weather: Cloudy, 81 °F (27 °C)
- Game attendance: 36,591
- Referee: Steven Strimling
- TV announcers (Pac-12 Network): J. B. Long (play-by-play), Max Browne (analyst)

Game information

First quarter

- (9:58) ARIZ – Michael Wiley 8-yard pass from Jayden de Laura, Tyler Loop kick (Drive: 11 plays, 75 yards, 5:02; Arizona 7–0)
- (6:35) COL – Owen McCown 1-yard run, Cole Becker kick (Drive: 9 plays, 70 yards, 3:23; Tied 7–7)
- (1:19) ARIZ – Jacob Cowing 3-yard pass from Jayden de Laura (Drive: 14 plays, 75 yards, 5:16; Arizona 13–7)

Second quarter

- (8:16) ARIZ – Dorian Singer 5-yard pass from Jayden de Laura (Drive: 4 plays, 60 yards, 1:11; Arizona 19–7)
- (3:42) ARIZ – Tanner McLachlan 8-yard pass from Jayden de Laura, Tyler Loop kick (Drive: 6 plays, 65 yards, 2:48; Arizona 26–7)
- (1:05) COL – Daniel Arias 14-yard pass from Owen McCown (Drive: 5 plays, 65 yards, 0:50; Arizona 26–13)

Third quarter

- (8:10) ARIZ – Tetairoa McMillan 23-yard pass from Jayden de Laura, Tyler Loop kick (Drive: 6 plays, 80 yards, 2:52; Arizona 33–13)
- (4:57) COL – Anthony Hankerson 7-yard run, Cole Becker kick (Drive: 7 plays, 75 yards, 3:13; Arizona 33–20)
- (1:22) ARIZ – Tyler Loop 29-yard field goal (Drive: 10 plays, 75 yards, 3:35; Arizona 36–20)

Fourth quarter

- (8:57) ARIZ – Michael Wiley 5-yard pass from Jayden de Laura, Tyler Loop kick (Drive: 11 plays, 57 yards, 4:32; Arizona 43–20)

Statistics	COL	ARIZ
First downs	19	36
Total yards	340	673
Rushes/yards	31–154	34–178
Passing yards	186	495
Passing: Comp–Att–Int	14–30–0	34–49–0
Time of possession	24:43	35:17

Team	Category	Player	Statistics
Colorado	Passing	Owen McCown	14/30, 186 yards, TD
Colorado	Rushing	Anthony Hankerson	12 carries, 68 yards, TD
Colorado	Receiving	Jordyn Tyson	1 reception, 42 yards
Arizona	Passing	Jayden de Laura	33/46, 484 yards, 6 TD
Arizona	Rushing	Michael Wiley	16 carries, 77 yards
Arizona	Receiving	Jacob Cowing	12 receptions, 180 yards, TD

=== vs California ===
California Golden Bears (3–2) vs Colorado Buffaloes (0–5) – Game summary

Quarter	1	2	3	4	OT	Total
Golden Bears	0	0	7	6	0	13
Buffaloes	0	3	0	10	7	20

at Folsom Field • Boulder, CO

- Date: October 15, 2022
- Game time: 12:00 p.m.
- Game weather: Cloudy, 65 °F (18 °C)
- Game attendance: 50,471
- Referee: Matthew Richards
- TV announcers (Pac-12 Network): J. B. Long (play-by-play), Max Browne (analyst)

Game information

First quarter

None

Second quarter

- (4:11) COL – Cole Becker 31-yard field goal (Drive: 8 plays, 57 yards, 4:39; Colorado 3–0)

Third quarter

- (5:49) CAL – J. Michael Sturdivant 14-yard pass from Jack Plummer, Dario Longhetto kick (Drive: 7 plays, 47 yards, 3:04; California 7–3)

Fourth quarter

- (14:25) COL – Anthony Hankerson 1-yard run, Cole Becker kick (Drive: 6 plays, 58 yards, 1:42; Colorado 10–7)
- (10:20) CAL – Dario Longhetto 27-yard field goal (Drive: 5 plays, 36 yards, 2:04; Tied 10–10)
- (4:30) COL – Cole Becker 24-yard field goal (Drive: 14 plays, 69 yards, 5:50; Colorado 13–10)
- (0:00) CAL – Dario Longhetto 34-yard field goal (Drive: 12 plays, 59 yards, 4:30; Tied 13–13)

Overtime

- (0:00) COL – Montana Lemonious-Craig 22-yard pass from J. T. Shrout, Cole Becker kick (Drive: 3 plays, 35 yards; Colorado 20–13)

Statistics	COL	CAL
First downs	17	19
Total yards	328	297
Rushes/yards	35–118	22–35
Passing yards	210	262
Passing: Comp–Att–Int	22–34–1	29–52–1
Time of possession	29:54	30:06

Team	Category	Player	Statistics
Colorado	Passing	Owen McCown	13/21, 104 yards, INT
Colorado	Rushing	Deion Smith	12 carries, 48 yards
Colorado	Receiving	Montana Lemonious-Craig	8 receptions, 119 yards, TD
California	Passing	Jack Plummer	29/52, 262 yards, TD, INT
California	Rushing	Jaydn Ott	16 carries, 47 yards
California	Receiving	Mavin Anderson	6 receptions, 61 yards

=== at Oregon State ===
Colorado Buffaloes (1–5) at Oregon State Beavers (5–2) – Game summary

Quarter	1	2	3	4	Total
Buffaloes	0	3	6	0	9
Beavers	7	14	14	7	42

at Reser Stadium • Corvallis, OR

- Date: October 22, 2022
- Game time: 5:00 p.m. PST
- Game weather: Cloudy, 57 °F (14 °C)
- Game attendance: 27,679
- Referee: Chris Coyte
- TV announcers (Pac-12 Network): Roxy Bernstein (play-by-play), Lincoln Kennedy (analyst)

Game information

First quarter

- (8:09) OSU – Damien Martinez 4-yard run, Atticus Sappington kick (Drive 9 plays, 40 yards, 4:59; Oregon State 7–0)

Second quarter

- (13:30) OSU – Silas Bolden 16-yard pass from Ben Gulbranson, Atticus Sappington kick (Drive 11 plays, 82 yards, 6:07; Oregon State 14–0)
- (8:44) COL – Cole Becker 44-yard field goal (Drive 8 plays, 33 yards, 4:34; Oregon State 14–3)
- (1:45) OSU – Damien Martinez 3-yard run, Atticus Sappington kick (Drive 5 plays, 55 yards, 2:47; Oregon State 21–3)

Third quarter

- (12:30) OSU – Jack Velling 60-yard pass from Ben Gulbranson, Atticus Sappington kick (Drive 8 plays, 80 yards, 5:34; Oregon State 28–3)
- (12:19) OSU – Alex Austin 42-yard interception return, Atticus Sappington kick (1 play, 0 yards, 0:11; Oregon State 35–3)
- (2:38) COL – Jayle Stacks 1-yard run (Drive 9 plays, 80 yards, 4:42; Oregon State 35–9)

Fourth quarter

- (7:38) OSU – Jack Colletto 2-yard run, Atticus Sappington kick (Drive 11 plays, 87 yards, 5:17; Oregon State 42–9)

Statistics	COL	OSU
First downs	17	26
Total yards	290	427
Rushes/yards	28–84	44–270
Passing yards	206	202
Passing: Comp–Att–Int	13–29–2	14–22–0
Time of possession	25:39	34:21

Team	Category	Player	Statistics
Colorado	Passing	J. T. Shrout	13/29, 206 yards, 2 INT
Colorado	Rushing	Jayle Stacks	8 carries, 50 yards, TD
Colorado	Receiving	Jordyn Tyson	3 receptions, 92 yards
Oregon State	Passing	Ben Gulbranson	14/22, 202 yards, 2 TD
Oregon State	Rushing	Damien Martinez	22 carries, 178 yards, 3 TD
Oregon State	Receiving	Jack Velling	1 reception, 60 yards, TD

=== vs Arizona State ===
Arizona State Sun Devils (2–5) vs Colorado Buffaloes (1–6) – Game summary

Quarter	1	2	3	4	Total
Sun Devils	14	14	7	7	42
Buffaloes	3	14	3	14	34

at Folsom Field • Boulder, CO

- Date: October 29, 2022
- Game time: 5:30 p.m.
- Game weather: Sunny, 50 °F (10 °C)
- Game attendance: 54,949
- Referee: Steve Strimling
- TV announcers (ESPNU): Drew Carter (play-by-play), Rene Ingoglia (analyst)

Game information

First quarter

- (10:37) ASU – Xazavian Valladay 3-yard run, Carter Brown kick (Drive: 8 plays, 64 yards, 3:23; Arizona State 7–0)
- (5:51) COL – Cole Becker 49-yard field goal (Drive: 10 plays, 44 yards, 4:46; Arizona State 7–3)
- (2:39) ASU – Jalin Conyers 12-yard pass from Trenton Bourguet, Carter Brown kick (Drive: 7 plays, 75 yards, 3:12; Arizona State 14–3)

Second quarter

- (10:52) COL – Montana Lemonious-Craig 7-yard pass from J. T. Shrout, Cole Becker kick (Drive: 7 plays, 52 yards, 3:14; Arizona State 14–10)
- (7:59) ASU – Xazavian Valladay 42-yard run, Carter Brown kick (Drive: 7 plays, 75 yards, 2:43; Arizona State 21–10)
- (3:16) COL – Jordyn Tyson 58-yard pass from J. T. Shrout, Cole Becker kick (Drive: 4 plays, 67 yards, 1:57; Arizona State 21–17)
- (0:55) ASU – Xazavian Valladay 1-yard run, Carter Brown kick (Drive: 9 plays, 75 yards, 2:21; Arizona State 28–17)

Third quarter

- (8:11) ASU – Jalin Conyers 5-yard pass from Trenton Bourguet, Carter Brown kick (Drive: 9 plays, 53 yards, 3:51; Arizona State 35–17)
- (3:47) COL – Cole Becker 27-yard field goal (Drive: 7 plays, 35 yards, 1:56; Arizona State 35–20)

Fourth quarter

- (12:40) ASU – Jalin Conyers 20-yard pass from Trenton Bourguet, Carter Brown kick (Drive: 7 plays, 88 yards, 3:37; Arizona State 42–20)
- (8:12) COL – Deion Smith 1-yard run, Cole Becker kick (Drive: 14 plays, 71 yards, 4:21; Arizona State 42–27)
- (3:50) COL – Jordyn Tyson 88-yard punt return, Cole Becker kick (Drive: 5 plays, 23 yards, 4:22; Arizona State 42–34)

Statistics	ASU	COL
First downs	22	20
Total yards	557	359
Rushes/yards	33–122	35–137
Passing yards	435	222
Passing: Comp–Att–Int	32–43–1	13–34–1
Time of possession	33:21	26:39

Team	Category	Player	Statistics
Arizona State	Passing	Trenton Bourguet	32/43, 435 yards, 3 TD, INT
Arizona State	Rushing	Xazavian Valladay	23 carries, 118 yards, 3 TD
Arizona State	Receiving	Elijhah Badger	8 receptions, 137 yards
Colorado	Passing	J. T. Shrout	13/34, 222 yards, 2 TD, INT
Colorado	Rushing	Deion Smith	24 carries, 111 yards, TD
Colorado	Receiving	Jordyn Tyson	5 receptions, 115 yards, TD

=== vs No. 8 Oregon ===
No. 8 Oregon Ducks (7–1) vs Colorado Buffaloes (1–7) – Game summary

Quarter	1	2	3	4	Total
No. 8 Ducks	14	14	14	7	49
Buffaloes	0	7	3	0	10

at Folsom Field • Boulder, CO

- Date: November 5, 2022
- Game time: 1:30 p.m.
- Game weather: Partly cloudy, 55 °F (13 °C)
- Game attendance: 42,089
- Referee: Matt Richards
- TV announcers (ESPN): Mike Monaco (play-by-play), Rod Gilmore (analyst), Tiffany Blackmon (sideline)

Game information

First quarter

- (12:14) ORE – Josh Conerly Jr. 4-yard pass from Bo Nix, Camden Lewis kick (Drive: 6 plays, 75 yards, 2:46; Oregon 7–0)
- (2:25) ORE – Bo Nix 18-yard pass from Bucky Irving, Camden Lewis kick (Drive: 13 plays, 85 yards, 4:55; Oregon 14–0)

Second quarter

- (12:43) ORE – Noah Sewell 1-yard run, Camden Lewis kick (Drive: 8 plays, 70 yards, 3:30; Oregon 21–0)
- (12:14) COL – Jordyn Tyson 81-yard pass from J. T. Shrout, Cole Becker kick (Drive: 3 plays, 81 yards, 0:29; Oregon 21–7)
- (0:53) ORE – Moliki Matavao 16-yard pass from Bo Nix, Camden Lewis kick (Drive: 7 plays, 78 yards, 3:09; Oregon 28–7)

Third quarter

- (11:51) COL – Cole Becker 44-yard field goal (Drive: 7 plays, 49 yards, 3:09; Oregon 28–10)
- (8:17) ORE – Bo Nix 1-yard run, Camden Lewis kick (Drive: 2 plays, 2 yards, 0:31; Oregon 35–10)
- (3:25) ORE – Noah Whittington 9-yard run, Camden Lewis kick (Drive: 6 plays, 25 yards, 2:24; Oregon 42–10)

Fourth quarter

- (12:53) ORE – Bo Nix 1-yard run, Camden Lewis kick (Drive: 7 plays, 51 yards, 2:32; Oregon 49–10)

Statistics	COL	ORE
First downs	20	21
Total yards	367	479
Rushes/yards	36–120	39–195
Passing yards	247	284
Passing: Comp–Att–Int	17–34–2	22–27–0
Time of possession	31:24	28:36

Team	Category	Player	Statistics
Colorado	Passing	J. T. Shrout	17/34, 247 yards, TD, 2 INT
Colorado	Rushing	Anthony Hankerson	11 carries, 54 yards
Colorado	Receiving	Jordyn Tyson	5 receptions, 137 yards, TD
Oregon	Passing	Bo Nix	20/24, 274 yards, 2 TD
Oregon	Rushing	Bucky Irving	11 carries, 120 yards
Oregon	Receiving	Kris Hutson	4 receptions, 80 yards

=== at No. 8 USC ===
Colorado Buffaloes (1–8) at No. 8 USC Trojans (8–1) – Game summary

Quarter	1	2	3	4	Total
Buffaloes	3	0	7	7	17
No. 8 Trojans	2	24	15	14	55

at Los Angeles Memorial Coliseum • Los Angeles, CA

- Date: November 11, 2022
- Game time: 6:30 p.m. PST
- Game weather: Clear, 71 °F (22 °C)
- Game attendance: 61,206
- Referee: Mike McCabe
- TV announcers (FS1): Alex Faust (play-by-play), Petros Papadakis (analyst)

Game information

First quarter

- (7:18) USC – Team safety (Drive: 1 plays, −12 yards, 0:06; USC 2–0)
- (1:24) COL – Cole Becker 28-yard field goal (Drive: 9 plays, 58 yards, 3:58; Colorado 3–2)

Second quarter

- (10:09) USC – Caleb Williams 2-yard run, Denis Lynch kick (Drive: 12 plays, 72 yards, 6:07; USC 9–3)
- (7:55) USC – Caleb Williams 4-yard run, Denis Lynch kick (Drive: 2 plays, 8 yards, 0:49; USC 16–3)
- (1:58) USC – Brenden Rice 32-yard pass from Caleb Williams, Denis Lynch kick (Drive: 8 plays, 67 yards, 3:37; USC 23–3)
- (0:00) USC – Denis Lynch 34-yard field goal (Drive: 6 plays, 45 yards, 0:45; USC 26–3)

Third quarter

- (5:49) COL – Alex Fontenot 3-yard run, Cole Becker kick (Drive: 9 plays, 53 yards, 4:37; USC 26–10)
- (4:50) USC – Tahj Washington 61-yard pass from Caleb Williams, Will Rose two-point run (Drive: 2 plays, 60 yards, 0:50; USC 34–10)
- (0:27) USC – Austin Jones 12-yard pass from Caleb Williams, Denis Lynch kick (Drive: 8 plays, 71 yards, 4:09; USC 41–10)

Fourth quarter

- (11:34) USC – Raleek Brown 25-yard pass from Miller Moss, Denis Lynch kick (Drive: 5 plays, 63 yards, 2:32; USC 48–10)
- (7:22) COL – J. T. Shrout 8-yard run, Cole Becker kick (Drive: 9 plays, 71 yards, 4:12; USC 48–17)
- (0:36) USC – Darwin Barlow 3-yard run, Denis Lynch kick (Drive: 12 plays, 75 yards, 6:46; USC 55–17)

Statistics	COL	USC
First downs	14	27
Total yards	259	351
Rushes/yards	35–135	41–185
Passing yards	124	346
Passing: Comp–Att–Int	11–21–1	20–33–1
Time of possession	25:30	34:30

Team	Category	Player	Statistics
Colorado	Passing	J. T. Shrout	11/21, 124 yards, INT
Colorado	Rushing	Alex Fontenot	20 carries, 108 yards, TD
Colorado	Receiving	Jack Hestera	3 receptions, 39 yards
USC	Passing	Caleb Williams	14/26, 268 yards, 3 TD, INT
USC	Rushing	Austin Jones	11 carries, 74 yards
USC	Receiving	Kyle Ford	3 receptions, 73 yards

=== at No. 17 Washington ===
Colorado Buffaloes (1–9) at No. 17 Washington Huskies (8–2) – Game summary

Quarter	1	2	3	4	Total
Buffaloes	0	0	7	0	7
No. 17 Huskies	14	19	14	7	54

at Husky Stadium • Seattle, WA

- Date: November 19, 2022
- Game time: 6:00 p.m. PST
- Game weather: Clear, 38 °F (3 °C)
- Game attendance: 67,969
- Referee: Jim Wharrie
- TV announcers (Pac-12 Network): Ted Robinson (play-by-play), Yogi Roth (analyst)

Game information

First quarter

- (5:18) WASH – Wayne Taulapapa 8-yard run, Peyton Henry kick (Drive: 12 plays, 85 yards, 5:51; Washington 7–0)
- (2:19) WASH – Jalen McMillan 27-yard pass from Michael Penix Jr., Peyton Henry kick (Drive: 2 plays, 38 yards, 0:46; Washington 14–0)

Second quarter

- (10:33) WASH – Wayne Taulapapa 2-yard run, Peyton Henry kick (Drive: 12 plays, 57 yards, 4:46; Washington 21–0)
- (1:32) WASH – Team safety (Drive: 4 plays, -31 yards, 0:23; Washington 23–0)
- (0:15) WASH – Cameron Davis 4-yard run, Peyton Henry kick (Drive: 7 plays, 45 yards, 1:10; Washington 30–0)
- (0:00) WASH – Peyton Henry 33-yard field goal (Drive: 2 plays, 0 yards, 0:11; Washington 33–0)

Third quarter

- (8:51) WASH – Cameron Davis 6-yard run, Peyton Henry kick (Drive: 4 plays, 43 yards, 1:27; Washington 40–0)
- (2:11) WASH – Richard Newton 2-yard run, Peyton Henry kick (Drive: 9 plays, 59 yards, 3:48; Washington 47–0)
- (1:45) COL – Montana Lemonious-Craig 69-yard pass from J. T. Shrout, Cole Becker kick (Drive: 2 plays, 69 yards, 0:18; Washington 47–7)

Fourth quarter

- (8:10) WASH – Sam Adams II 15-yard pass from Dylan Morris, Addison Shrock kick (Drive: 12 plays, 87 yards, 5:57; Washington 54–7)

Statistics	COL	WASH
First downs	10	29
Total yards	202	575
Rushes/yards	33–79	43–280
Passing yards	123	295
Passing: Comp–Att–Int	7–22–1	23–38–1
Time of possession	27:13	32:47

Team	Category	Player	Statistics
Colorado	Passing	J. T. Shrout	6/18, 120 yards, TD, INT
Colorado	Rushing	Alex Fontenot	11 carries, 71 yards
Colorado	Receiving	Montana Lemonious-Craig	1 reception, 69 yards, TD
Washington	Passing	Michael Penix Jr.	19/31, 229 yards, TD
Washington	Rushing	Wayne Taulapapa	11 carries, 107 yards, 2 TD
Washington	Receiving	Jalen McMillan	8 receptions, 98 yards, TD

=== vs No. 14 Utah ===
No. 14 Utah Utes (8–3) vs Colorado Buffaloes (1–10) – Game summary

Quarter	1	2	3	4	Total
No. 14 Utes	14	28	14	7	63
Buffaloes	0	0	14	7	21

at Folsom Field • Boulder, CO

- Date: November 26, 2022
- Game time: 2:00 p.m.
- Game weather: Sunny, 58 °F (14 °C)
- Game attendance: 33,474
- Referee: Francisco Villar
- TV announcers (Pac-12 Network): Ted Robinson (play-by-play), Yogi Roth (analyst)

Game information

First quarter

- (6:35) UTAH – Micah Bernard 8-yard run, Jadon Redding kick (Drive: 8 plays, 59 yards, 4:02; Utah 7–0)
- (2:20) UTAH – Ja'Quinden Jackson 10-yard run, Jadon Redding kick (Drive: 4 plays, 53 yards, 1:51; Utah 14–0)

Second quarter

- (12:34) UTAH – Ja'Quinden Jackson 2-yard run, Jadon Redding kick (Drive: 7 plays, 80 yards, 3:04; Utah 21–0)
- (4:43) UTAH – Thomas Yassmin 41-yard pass from Cameron Rising, Jadon Redding kick (Drive: 2 plays, 54 yards, 0:55; Utah 28–0)
- (0:52) UTAH – Money Parks 9-yard pass from Cameron Rising, Jadon Redding kick (Drive: 7 plays, 67 yards, 3:04; Utah 35–0)
- (0:03) UTAH – Dalton Kincaid 29-yard pass from Cameron Rising, Jadon Redding kick (Drive: 3 plays, 70 yards, 0:25; Utah 42–0)

Third quarter

- (11:47) COL – Alex Fontenot 1-yard run, Cole Becker kick (Drive: 2 plays, 11 yards, 0:38; Utah 42–7)
- (10:49) UTAH – Ja'Quinden Jackson 66-yard run, Jadon Redding kick (Drive: 2 plays, 75 yards, 0:48; Utah 49–7)
- (5:37) UTAH – Makai Cope 21-yard pass from Bryson Barnes, Jadon Redding kick (Drive: 5 plays, 62 yards, 3:12; Utah 56–7)
- (2:59) COL – Anthony Hankerson 23-yard run, Cole Becker kick (Drive: 6 plays, 79 yards, 2:32; Utah 56–14)

Fourth quarter

- (8:34) UTAH – Jaylon Glover 5-yard run, Jadon Redding kick (Drive: 8 plays, 72 yards, 5:31; Utah 63–14)
- (2:46) COL – Frank Fillip 1-yard pass from Maddox Kopp, Cole Becker kick (Drive: 12 plays, 76 yards, 5:42; Utah 63–21)

Statistics	UTAH	COL
First downs	32	12
Total yards	662	185
Rushes/yards	43–383	25–62
Passing yards	279	123
Passing: Comp–Att–Int	21–24–1	15–28–0
Time of possession	35:20	24:40

Team	Category	Player	Statistics
Utah	Passing	Cameron Rising	17/19, 234 yards, 3 TD
Utah	Rushing	Ja'Quinden Jackson	10 carries, 117 yards, 3 TD
Utah	Receiving	Dalton Kincaid	5 receptions, 102 yards, TD
Colorado	Passing	Maddox Kopp	15/28, 123 yards, TD
Colorado	Rushing	Anthony Hankerson	8 carries, 46 yards, TD
Colorado	Receiving	Brady Russell	4 receptions, 39 yards
