= 2013 North Dakota State Bison football team =

In the 2013 NCAA Division I FCS football season

2013 North Dakota State Bison football

NCAA Division I champion MVFC champion

NCAA Division I Championship, W 35–7 vs. Towson
- Conference: Missouri Valley Football Conference

Ranking
- Sports Network: No. 1
- FCS Coaches: No. 1
- Record: 15–0 (8–0 MVFC)
- Head coach: Craig Bohl (11th season)
- Offensive coordinator: Brent Vigen (5th season)
- Offensive scheme: Pro-style
- Defensive coordinator: Chris Klieman (2nd season)
- Base defense: 4–3
- Home stadium: Fargodome

2013 Missouri Valley Football Conference standings
	Conf.			Overall
Team	W		L	W		L
No. 1 North Dakota State $^	8	–	0	15	–	0
No. 13 South Dakota State ^	5	–	3	9	–	5
No. 18 Youngstown State	5	–	3	8	–	4
Southern Illinois	5	–	3	7	–	5
Missouri State	5	–	3	5	–	7
Illinois State	4	–	4	5	–	6
South Dakota	3	–	5	4	–	8
Northern Iowa	3	–	5	7	–	5
Western Illinois	2	–	6	4	–	8
Indiana State	0	–	8	1	–	11
$ – Conference champion; ^ – FCS playoff participant; Rankings from The Sports Network poll

The 2013 North Dakota State Bison football team represented North Dakota State University in the 2013 NCAA Division I FCS football season. They were led by head coach Craig Bohl, in his 11th and ultimately final season. He left to become the head coach at Wyoming after the season. The team, which played their 21st season in the Fargodome, entered the season as the two-time defending national champions. The Bison have been members of the Missouri Valley Football Conference since the 2008 season.

The season started with a road win over defending Big 12 champion Kansas State 24–21, in front of the second-largest crowd in Wildcats history. According to ESPN.com, Kansas State paid the Bison $350,000 for the matchup. This was the Bison's fourth straight win against an FBS opponent and seventh overall.

The university hosted ESPN College GameDay on September 21, 2013, as the Bison faced Delaware State that afternoon and defeated the Hornets 51–0. This was the first time in the show's history that it was broadcast live from downtown Fargo, and was a rare feature of a non-FBS program. On October 12, in a home game against Missouri State, the Fargodome set a new single-game attendance record (19,108).

With a win at Youngstown State, the Bison won their third consecutive MVFC title, and clinched an automatic playoff spot. The Bison finished the regular season with a perfect overall record of 11–0, their first undefeated record since 1990. NDSU received 17 points in the final AP poll of the 2013 season, which would have ranked them 29th if that poll ranked teams beyond the top 25.

On December 9, 2013, Bohl was introduced as the next head coach at Wyoming effective at the end of the season. On December 15, Bison defensive coordinator Chris Klieman was selected as Bohl's successor as head coach for the 2014 season.

Their victory in the 2013 FCS title game, held on January 4, 2014, at Toyota Stadium in the Dallas suburb of Frisco, Texas, made the Bison only the second team to win three consecutive FCS national titles, following the run from 2005 to 2007 by Appalachian State. The Bison were also the first unbeaten FCS champions since Marshall in 1996.

== Schedule ==
Date	Time	Opponent	Rank	Site	TV	Result	Attendance
August 30	7:30 pm	at Kansas State*	No. 1	Bill Snyder Family Football Stadium; Manhattan, KS	FS1	W 24–21	53,351
September 7	4:00 pm	Ferris State*	No. 1	Fargodome; Fargo, ND	NBC ND/ESPN3	W 56–10	18,979
September 21	4:00 pm	Delaware State*	No. 1	Fargodome; Fargo, ND (College GameDay)	NBC ND, FCS	W 51–0	18,995
September 28	2:00 pm	at No. 6 South Dakota State	No. 1	Coughlin–Alumni Stadium; Brookings, SD (Dakota Marker)	NBC ND	W 20–0	16,498
October 5	2:30 pm	No. 4 Northern Iowa	No. 1	Fargodome; Fargo, ND	NBC ND/FCS	W 24–23	18,840
October 12	1:00 pm	Missouri State^{†}	No. 1	Fargodome; Fargo, ND	NBC ND/ESPN3	W 41–26	19,108‡
October 19	2:00 pm	at Southern Illinois	No. 1	Saluki Stadium; Carbondale, IL	NBC ND/ESPN3	W 31–10	11,121
October 26	2:00 pm	at Indiana State	No. 1	Memorial Stadium; Terre Haute, IN	ESPN3	W 56–10	5,009
November 9	2:30 pm	Illinois State	No. 1	Fargodome; Fargo, ND (Harvest Bowl)	NBC ND/FCS	W 28–10	18,076
November 16	2:00 pm	at No. 15 Youngstown State	No. 1	Stambaugh Stadium; Youngstown, OH	NBC ND/ESPN3	W 35–17	13,164
November 23	2:30 pm	South Dakota	No. 1	Fargodome; Fargo, ND	NBC ND	W 42–0	18,234
December 7	2:30 pm	Furman*	No. 1	Fargodome; Fargo, ND (NCAA Division I Second Round)	ESPN3	W 38–7	18,455
December 14	11:00 am	No. 11 Coastal Carolina*	No. 1	Fargodome; Fargo, ND (NCAA Division I Quarterfinal)	ESPN	W 48–14	18,219
December 20	7:00 pm	No. 15 New Hampshire*	No. 1	Fargodome; Fargo, ND (NCAA Division I Semifinal)	ESPN2	W 52–14	18,694
January 4, 2014	1:00 pm	vs. No. 5 Towson*	No. 1	Toyota Stadium; Frisco, TX (NCAA Division I Championship Game)	ESPN2	W 35–7	19,802
*Non-conference game; ^{†}Homecoming; Rankings from The Sports Network Poll released prior to the game; All times are in Central time

‡ Denotes single-game home attendance record.

== Rankings ==
AP poll

Ranking movements Legend: ██ Increase in ranking ██ Decrease in ranking — = Not ranked RV = Received votes
	Week																
Poll	Pre	1	2	3	4	5	6	7	8	9	10	11	12	13	14	15	Final
AP	—	—	—	—	—	—	—	—	—	—	—	—	—	RV	RV	RV	RV

FCS polls

Ranking movements
	Week														
Poll	Pre	1	2	3	4	5	6	7	8	9	10	11	12	13	Final
Sports Network	1	1	1	1	1	1	1	1	1	1	1	1	1	1	1

== Game summaries ==
=== At Kansas State ===
	1	2	3	4	Total
#1 Bison	7	0	10	7	24
Wildcats	0	7	14	0	21

Box Score. 2nd-largest crowd in Kansas State history (53,351).

=== Ferris State ===
	1	2	3	4	Total
Bulldogs	0	7	3	0	10
#1 Bison	21	14	7	14	56

Box Score

=== Delaware State ===
	1	2	3	4	Total
Hornets	0	0	0	0	0
#1 Bison	20	21	10	0	51

Box Score

=== At South Dakota State ===
	1	2	3	4	Total
#1 Bison	0	7	0	13	20
#6 Jackrabbits	0	0	0	0	0

Box Score. Set a new home attendance record for South Dakota State (16,498).

=== Northern Iowa ===
	1	2	3	4	Total
#4 Panthers	6	7	10	0	23
#1 Bison	0	7	3	14	24

Box Score

=== Missouri State ===
	1	2	3	4	Total
Bears	0	13	7	6	26
#1 Bison	10	14	14	3	41

Box Score. New home attendance record.

=== At Southern Illinois ===
	1	2	3	4	Total
#1 Bison	0	7	21	3	31
Salukis	7	3	0	0	10

Box Score

=== At Indiana State ===
	1	2	3	4	Total
#1 Bison	21	28	7	0	56
Sycamores	0	10	0	0	10

Box Score ‡NDSU's only loss in 2012.

=== Illinois State ===
	1	2	3	4	Total
Redbirds	0	7	3	0	10
#1 Bison	14	7	0	7	28

Box Score

=== At Youngstown State ===
	1	2	3	4	Total
#1 Bison	7	7	14	7	35
#15 Penguins	7	3	7	0	17

Box Score

=== South Dakota ===
	1	2	3	4	Total
Coyotes	0	0	0	0	0
#1 Bison	14	14	14	0	42

=== Furman—NCAA Division I Second Round ===
	1	2	3	4	Total
Paladins	0	7	0	0	7
#1 Bison	0	10	21	7	38

=== Coastal Carolina—NCAA Division I Quarterfinal ===
	1	2	3	4	Total
#11 Chanticleers	0	7	7	0	14
#1 Bison	17	17	0	14	48

=== New Hampshire—NCAA Division I Semifinal ===
	1	2	3	4	Total
#15 Wildcats	7	0	0	7	14
#1 Bison	7	24	14	7	52

=== Towson—NCAA Division I Championship Game ===
	1	2	3	4	Total
#5 Tigers	7	0	0	0	7
#1 Bison	7	14	7	7	35

== Coaching staff ==
Name	Position	Year at North Dakota State	Alma mater (year)
Craig Bohl	Head coach	11th	Nebraska (1982)
Brent Vigen	Offensive coordinator Quarterbacks	16th	North Dakota State (1998)
Chris Klieman	Defensive coordinator Defensive backs	3rd	Northern Iowa (1990)
Kenni Burns	Recruiting coordinator Wide receivers coach	4th	Indiana (2006)
A. J. Cooper	Defensive ends coach/special teams coordinator	8th	North Dakota State (2006)
Scott Fuchs	Offensive line	5th	North Dakota State (1995)
Nick Goeser	Defensive tackles coach	4th	Wisconsin–Eau Claire (2003)
Conor Riley	Tight ends Running backs	1st	Nebraska–Omaha (2002)
Steve Stanard	Linebackers	2nd	Nebraska (1989)
Gordie Haug	Offensive assistant	2nd	Bemidji State (2009)
John Richardson	Defensive assistant	3rd	North Dakota State (2010)
Jake Chapman	Video coordinator	1st	Ohio (2012)
