= Darius Latham =

American football player (born 1994)

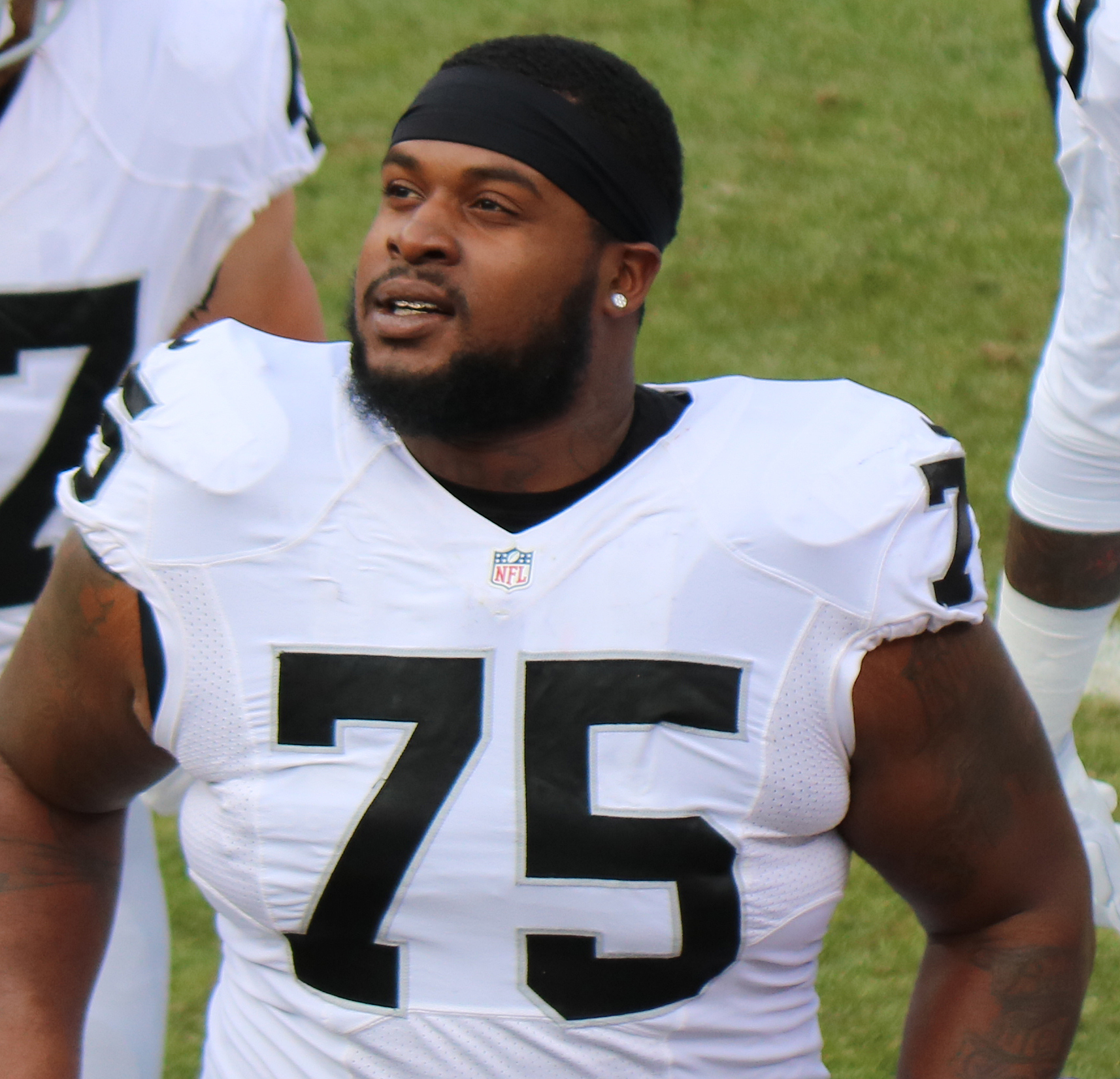
- Latham with the Oakland Raiders in 2016

No. 75
- Position: Defensive tackle

Personal information
- Born: November 9, 1994 (age 32); Indianapolis, Indiana, U.S.
- Listed height: 6 ft 5 in (1.96 m)
- Listed weight: 300 lb (136 kg)

Career information
- High school: North Central (Indianapolis)
- College: Indiana
- NFL draft: 2016: undrafted

Career history
- Oakland Raiders (2016–2017); Arizona Hotshots (2019)*
- * Offseason or practice squad member only

Career NFL statistics
- Total tackles: 24
- Sacks: 0.0
- Forced fumbles: 0
- Fumble recoveries: 0
- Stats at Pro Football Reference

Darius Latham (born November 9, 1994) is an American former professional football player who was a defensive tackle for the Oakland Raiders of the National Football League (NFL) from 2016 to 2017. He played college football for the Indiana Hoosiers.

== Early life ==
Latham was born to Cori Latham and David Turner on November 9, 1994. Graduating from North Central High School in Indianapolis, Latham lettered all four years in both basketball and football. During his high school football career, Latham received several accolades for his on the field achievements, including rated the Indiana Football Coaches Association Top 50 player and all-state as a junior and senior, Indiana Associated Press Class 5A All-State as a senior and honorable mention as a junior, selected to the 2012 Indianapolis Star Super Team, runner-up for the Indianapolis Star Position Award (defensive line), nominated for the 2013 U.S. Army All-American Bowl and two-time first-team all-conference and All-Marion County selection. Latham would make 62 tackles with eight sacks and 15.5 tackles for loss in 2012 and was voted team captain as a senior and the defensive lineman of the year his final two seasons. Latham was rated the Number 3 prospect in Indiana and the Number 160 prospect nationally by 247Sports, while achieving the rating of Number 14 defensive tackle nationally and the Number 239 prospect overall by Rivals.com.

== College career ==
Latham received offer letters from 17 NCAA Division I schools, including Ohio State, Michigan, Wisconsin, Notre Dame and Florida. On February 6, 2013, Latham signed his National Letter of Intent to play football for Indiana.

=== Freshman ===
Latham would start all 12 games as a freshman for the Hoosiers. He recorded his first sack of his collegiate career against Indiana State on August 29, 2013. Latham would finish the season making 22 tackles with two sacks (14 yards), three tackles for loss (16 yards), one fumble recovery and three pass breakups. Following the conclusion of the 2013 season, Latham would receive honorable mention for the All-Big Ten Freshman team from BTN.com.

=== Sophomore ===
Latham would start in 10 of 12 games his sophomore year. He would finish the season making 26 tackles with 1.5 sacks (6 yards), 5.5 tackles for loss (15 yards), one fumble recovery and three pass breakups. Against Iowa, Latham would post a career-high six stops.

=== Junior ===
During Latham's final year at Indiana, he played in 11 of 12 games. He would finish the 2015 season second on the team with four sacks (22 yards) and third on the team with 10 tackles for loss (35 yards). Additionally, he would record a total of 33 tackles, 16 solo, one interception, one pass breakup and two blocked kicks. Latham would finish the 2015 season receiving Honorable mention for the All-Big Ten team (coaches). On December 30, 2015, Latham declared his intention to enter the NFL draft.

== Professional career ==
Latham was predicted to be the second-best defensive tackle in the fifth round of the 2016 NFL draft by Mel Kiper.

Pre-draft measurables
Height	Weight	Arm length	Hand span	40-yard dash	20-yard shuttle	Three-cone drill	Vertical jump	Broad jump	Bench press
6 ft 4 in (1.93 m)	311 lb (141 kg)	34.75 in (0.88 m)	10 in (0.25 m)	5.32 s	4.73 s	7.60 s	27 1/2 in (0.70 m)	8 ft 8 in (2.64 m)	19 reps
All values from NFL Combine.

Latham was not drafted in the 2016 NFL draft; however, on April 30, 2016, he reached a deal with the Oakland Raiders and was signed as an undrafted free agent. Latham signed a three-year contract, worth $1.62 million.

On October 9, 2017, Latham was suspended four games for violating the league's substance abuse policy. On December 4, 2017, he was waived by the Raiders and re-signed to the practice squad. He was promoted to the active roster on December 13, 2017.

On April 26, 2018, Latham was waived by the Raiders.

Latham signed with the Arizona Hotshots of the Alliance of American Football (AAF) for the 2019 season, but was waived during final roster cuts on January 30, 2019.
