= 2013 Western Illinois Leathernecks football team =

American college football season

2013 Western Illinois Leathernecks football
- Conference: Missouri Valley Football Conference
- Record: 4–8 (2–6 MVFC)
- Head coach: Bob Nielson (1st season)
- Defensive coordinator: Brian Ward (2nd season)
- Home stadium: Hanson Field

2013 Missouri Valley Football Conference standings
	Conf.			Overall
Team	W		L	W		L
No. 1 North Dakota State $^	8	–	0	15	–	0
No. 13 South Dakota State ^	5	–	3	9	–	5
No. 18 Youngstown State	5	–	3	8	–	4
Southern Illinois	5	–	3	7	–	5
Missouri State	5	–	3	5	–	7
Illinois State	4	–	4	5	–	6
South Dakota	3	–	5	4	–	8
Northern Iowa	3	–	5	7	–	5
Western Illinois	2	–	6	4	–	8
Indiana State	0	–	8	1	–	11
$ – Conference champion; ^ – FCS playoff participant; Rankings from The Sports Network poll

The 2013 Western Illinois Leathernecks football team represented Western Illinois University as a member of the Missouri Valley Football Conference (MVFC) during the 2013 NCAA Division I FCS football season. Led by first-year head coach Bob Nielson, the Leathernecks compiled an overall record of 4–8 overall with mark of 2–6 in conference play, placing ninth in the MVFC. Western Illinois played home games at Hanson Field in Macomb, Illinois.

== Schedule ==
Date	Time	Opponent	Site	TV	Result	Attendance
August 29	6:00 pm	Hampton*	Hanson Field; Macomb, IL	WIUS^	W 42–9	6,437
September 7	1:00 pm	Quincy*	Hanson Field; Macomb, IL	WIUS^	W 34–6	4,021
September 14	11:00 am	at Minnesota*	TCF Bank Stadium; Minneapolis, MN	BTN	L 12–29	42,127
September 21	9:00 pm	at UNLV*	Sam Boyd Stadium; Whitney, NV		L 7–38	13,017
September 28	3:00 pm	South Dakota	Hanson Field; Macomb, IL	WIUS^	W 24–10	5,732
October 5	2:00 pm	at Illinois State	Hancock Stadium; Normal, IL		L 21–35	11,529
October 12	3:00 pm	No. 13 South Dakota State^{†}	Hanson Field; Macomb, IL	MVC TV	L 14–38	10,232
October 19	3:00 pm	at No. 16 Youngstown State	Stambaugh Stadium; Youngstown, OH	ESPN3	L 14–21	13,607
October 26	6:00 pm	Missouri State	Hanson Field; Macomb, IL	WIUS^	L 27–38	3,624
November 2	1:00 pm	Southern Illinois	Hanson Field; Macomb, IL	WIUS^	L 28–34	3,104
November 16	1:00 pm	at Indiana State	Memorial Stadium; Terre Haute, IN		W 21–14	4,109
November 23	4:00 pm	at Northern Iowa	UNI-Dome; Cedar Falls, IA		L 13–28	9,568
*Non-conference game; ^{†}Homecoming; Rankings from The Sports Network Poll released prior to the game; All times are in Central time

^Game aired on a tape delayed basis
