= 2013 Northern Iowa Panthers football team =

American college football season

2013 Northern Iowa Panthers football
- Conference: Missouri Valley Football Conference
- Record: 7–5 (3–5 MVFC)
- Head coach: Mark Farley (13th season)
- Co-offensive coordinators: Bill Salmon (13th season); Mario Verduzco (8th season)
- Offensive scheme: Multiple
- Defensive coordinator: Jeremiah Johnson (1st season)
- Base defense: 3–4
- Home stadium: UNI-Dome

2013 Missouri Valley Football Conference standings
	Conf.			Overall
Team	W		L	W		L
No. 1 North Dakota State $^	8	–	0	15	–	0
No. 13 South Dakota State ^	5	–	3	9	–	5
No. 18 Youngstown State	5	–	3	8	–	4
Southern Illinois	5	–	3	7	–	5
Missouri State	5	–	3	5	–	7
Illinois State	4	–	4	5	–	6
South Dakota	3	–	5	4	–	8
Northern Iowa	3	–	5	7	–	5
Western Illinois	2	–	6	4	–	8
Indiana State	0	–	8	1	–	11
$ – Conference champion; ^ – FCS playoff participant; Rankings from The Sports Network poll

The 2013 Northern Iowa Panthers football team represented the University of Northern Iowa as a member of the Missouri Valley Football Conference (MVFC) during the 2013 NCAA Division I FCS football season. Led by 13th-year head coach Mark Farley, the Panthers compiled an overall record of 7–5 with a mark of 3–5 in conference play, tying for seventh place in the MVFC. The team played home games at the UNI-Dome in Cedar Falls, Iowa.

== Schedule ==
Date	Time	Opponent	Rank	Site	TV	Result	Attendance	Source
August 31	7:00 pm	at Iowa State*	No. 17	Jack Trice Stadium; Ames, IA	MC 22	W 28–20	56,800	
September 7	4:00 pm	Drake*	No. 9	UNI-Dome; Cedar Falls, IA	KCRG 9.2	W 45–15	15,960	
September 21	2:30 pm	at Northern Colorado*	No. 7	Nottingham Field; Greeley, CO	BSTV	W 27–6	3,025	
September 28	4:00 pm	No. 9 McNeese State*	No. 5	UNI-Dome; Cedar Falls, IA		W 41–6	12,325	
October 5	2:30 pm	at No. 1 North Dakota State	No. 4	Fargodome; Fargo, ND	FCS	L 23–24	18,840	
October 12	4:00 pm	Southern Illinois^{†}	No. 4	UNI-Dome; Cedar Falls, IA		L 17–24 ^{OT}	16,423	
October 19	4:00 pm	South Dakota	No. 11	UNI-Dome; Cedar Falls, IA		L 31–38 ^{2OT}	11,121	
October 26	2:00 pm	at No. 25 South Dakota State	No. 17	Coughlin–Alumni Stadium; Brookings, SD	Midco SN	L 34–37 ^{2OT}	7,912	
November 2	1:00 pm	at Illinois State		Hancock Stadium; Normal, IL		L 3–13	8,006	
November 9	4:00 pm	No. 9 Youngstown State		UNI-Dome; Cedar Falls, IA	KCRG 9.2	W 22–20	10,034	
November 16	1:00 pm	at Missouri State		Plaster Sports Complex; Springfield, MO	ESPN3	W 17–10	5,621	
November 23	4:00 pm	Western Illinois		UNI-Dome; Cedar Falls, IA		W 28–13	9,568	
*Non-conference game; ^{†}Homecoming; Rankings from The Sports Network Poll released prior to the game; All times are in Central time

== Rankings ==
Ranking movements Legend: ██ Increase in ranking ██ Decrease in ranking — = Not ranked RV = Received votes
	Week														
Poll	Pre	1	2	3	4	5	6	7	8	9	10	11	12	13	Final
Sports Network	17	9	7	7	5	4	4	11	17	RV	RV	RV	RV	—	RV
Coaches	16	9	8	7	5	4	5	13	18	RV	RV	—	—	—	—

== Personnel ==
=== Coaching staff ===
Name	Position	Year at Northern Iowa	Alma mater (year)
Mark Farley	Head coach	13th	Northern Iowa (1987)
Rick Nelson	Offensive line	14th	Northern Iowa (1984)
Bill Salmon	Associate head coach Offensive coordinator	13th	Northern Iowa (1980)
Mario Verduzco	Co-offensive coordinator Quarterbacks	13th	San José State (1988)
Jeremiah Johnson	Linebackers	7th	Kansas (2000)
Daniel Bullocks	Defensive backs	2nd	Nebraska (2005)
Brandon Lynch	Defensive backs	1st	Middle Tennessee State (2006)
Ryan Mahaffey	Tight ends	1st	Northern Iowa (2011)
Bryce Paup	Defensive Line coach	1st	
Todd Blythe	Wide Receivers Coach	2nd	Iowa State (2008)
Garrett Scott	Graduate assistant	1st	Northern Iowa (2012)
D. J. Hord	Director of football operations	2nd	Notre Dame (2009)
