= 2013 Missouri State Bears football team =

American college football season

2013 Missouri State Bears football
- Conference: Missouri Valley Football Conference
- Record: 5–7 (5–3 MVFC)
- Head coach: Terry Allen (8th season)
- Offensive coordinator: Rob Christophel (8th season)
- Offensive scheme: Spread
- Defensive coordinator: D. J. Vokolek (8th season)
- Base defense: 3–4
- Captains: Zack Cooley; Tevan Ferguson; Caleb Schaffitzel; Matt Swan
- Home stadium: Plaster Sports Complex

2013 Missouri Valley Football Conference standings
	Conf.			Overall
Team	W		L	W		L
No. 1 North Dakota State $^	8	–	0	15	–	0
No. 13 South Dakota State ^	5	–	3	9	–	5
No. 18 Youngstown State	5	–	3	8	–	4
Southern Illinois	5	–	3	7	–	5
Missouri State	5	–	3	5	–	7
Illinois State	4	–	4	5	–	6
South Dakota	3	–	5	4	–	8
Northern Iowa	3	–	5	7	–	5
Western Illinois	2	–	6	4	–	8
Indiana State	0	–	8	1	–	11
$ – Conference champion; ^ – FCS playoff participant; Rankings from The Sports Network poll

The 2013 Missouri State Bears football team represented Missouri State University as a member of the Missouri Valley Football Conference (MVFC) during the 2013 NCAA Division I FCS football season. Led by eighth-year head coach Terry Allen, the Bears compiled an overall record of 5–7 with a mark of 5–3 in conference play, placing in a four-way tie for second in the MVFC. Missouri State played home games at Plaster Sports Complex in Springfield, Missouri.

== Schedule ==
Date	Time	Opponent	Site	TV	Result	Attendance
August 29	6:00 pm	Northwestern State*	Plaster Sports Complex; Springfield, MO	Mediacom	L 17–23	10,147
September 7	11:00 am	at Iowa*	Kinnick Stadium; Iowa City, IA	BTN	L 14–28	64,201
September 14	6:00 pm	at Murray State*	Roy Stewart Stadium; Murray, KY		L 38–41	10,132
September 21	6:00 pm	No. 13 Central Arkansas*	Plaster Sports Complex; Springfield, MO		L 13–17	8,963
September 28	1:00 pm	Illinois State	Plaster Sports Complex; Springfield, MO	Mediacom	W 37–10	8,507
October 5	2:00 pm	at South Dakota	DakotaDome; Vermillion, SD	Midco SN	L 14–17	9,758
October 12	1:00 pm	at No. 1 North Dakota State	Fargodome; Fargo, ND	ESPN3	L 26–41	19,108
October 19	1:00 pm	No. 15 South Dakota State^{†}	Plaster Sports Complex; Springfield, MO	Mediacom	W 35–21	12,312
October 26	6:00 pm	at Western Illinois	Hanson Field; Macomb, IL	WIUS^	W 38–27	3,624
November 2	1:00 pm	Indiana State	Plaster Sports Complex; Springfield, MO		W 49–7	6,648
November 9	2:00 pm	at Southern Illinois	Saluki Stadium; Carbondale, IL		W 37–27	5,642
November 16	1:00 pm	Northern Iowa	Plaster Sports Complex; Springfield, MO	ESPN3	L 10–17	5,621
*Non-conference game; ^{†}Homecoming; Rankings from The Sports Network Poll released prior to the game; All times are in Central time

^Game aired on a tape delayed basis
