= 2013 Illinois State Redbirds football team =

American college football season

2013 Illinois State Redbirds football
- Conference: Missouri Valley Football Conference
- Record: 5–6 (4–4 MVFC)
- Head coach: Brock Spack (5th season)
- Offensive coordinator: George Barnett (1st season)
- Defensive coordinator: Brock Spack (2nd season)
- MVPs: Marshaun Coprich; Colton Underwood
- Captains: Colton Underwood; Jordan Neukirch
- Home stadium: Hancock Stadium

2013 Missouri Valley Football Conference standings
	Conf.			Overall
Team	W		L	W		L
No. 1 North Dakota State $^	8	–	0	15	–	0
No. 13 South Dakota State ^	5	–	3	9	–	5
No. 18 Youngstown State	5	–	3	8	–	4
Southern Illinois	5	–	3	7	–	5
Missouri State	5	–	3	5	–	7
Illinois State	4	–	4	5	–	6
South Dakota	3	–	5	4	–	8
Northern Iowa	3	–	5	7	–	5
Western Illinois	2	–	6	4	–	8
Indiana State	0	–	8	1	–	11
$ – Conference champion; ^ – FCS playoff participant; Rankings from The Sports Network poll

The 2013 Illinois State Redbirds football team represented Illinois State University as a member of the Missouri Valley Football Conference (MVFC) during the 2013 NCAA Division I FCS football season. Led by fifth-year head coach Brock Spack, the Redbirds compiled an overall record of 5–6 with a mark of 4–4 in conference play, placing sixth in the MVFC. Illinois State played home games at Hancock Stadium in Normal, Illinois.

== Schedule ==
Date	Time	Opponent	Rank	Site	TV	Result	Attendance
August 29	6:00 pm	at Ball State*	No. 13	Scheumann Stadium; Muncie, IN	ESPN3	L 28–51	16,327
September 14	6:00 pm	at No. 9 Eastern Illinois*	No. 18	O'Brien Stadium; Charleston, IL (Mid-America Classic)		L 24–57	10,741
September 21	6:00 pm	Abilene Christian*		Hancock Stadium; Normal, IL		W 31–17	11,029
September 28	1:00 pm	at Missouri State		Plaster Sports Complex; Springfield, MO	Mediacom	L 10–37	8,507
October 5	2:00 pm	Western Illinois		Hancock Stadium; Normal, IL	CSNC	W 35–21	11,529
October 12	6:00 pm	at No. 18 Youngstown State		Stambaugh Stadium; Youngstown, OH	CSNC	L 21–59	16,593
October 19	1:00 pm	Indiana State		Hancock Stadium; Normal, IL	ESPN3	W 55–14	8,262
October 26	1:00 pm	South Dakota		Hancock Stadium; Normal, IL		W 28–14	11,868
November 2	1:00 pm	Northern Iowa		Hancock Stadium; Normal, IL	CSNC	W 13–3	8,006
November 9	2:30 pm	at No. 1 North Dakota State		Fargodome; Fargo, ND	FCS	L 10–28	18,076
November 16	2:00 pm	at Southern Illinois		Saluki Stadium; Carbondale, IL	CSNC	L 17–24	5,885
*Non-conference game; Rankings from The Sports Network Poll released prior to the game; All times are in Central time

== Ranking movements ==
Ranking movements Legend: ██ Increase in ranking ██ Decrease in ranking — = Not ranked RV = Received votes
	Week														
Poll	Pre	1	2	3	4	5	6	7	8	9	10	11	12	13	Final
Sports Network	13	19	18	RV	RV	RV	RV	RV	RV	RV	RV	RV	RV	RV	RV
Coaches	10	17	16	24	24	RV	—	—	—	—	—	—	—	—	RV

== Redbirds drafted ==
Draft Year	Player	Position	Round	Overall	NFL Team
2014	Shelby Harris	DE	7	235	Oakland Raiders
