= 2013 South Dakota Coyotes football team =

American college football season

2013 South Dakota Coyotes football
- Conference: Missouri Valley Football Conference
- Record: 4–8 (3–5 MVFC)
- Head coach: Joe Glenn (2nd season)
- Offensive coordinator: Wesley Beschorner (5th season)
- Offensive scheme: Spread
- Defensive coordinator: Jason Petrino (2nd season)
- Base defense: 4–3
- Home stadium: DakotaDome

2013 Missouri Valley Football Conference standings
	Conf.			Overall
Team	W		L	W		L
No. 1 North Dakota State $^	8	–	0	15	–	0
No. 13 South Dakota State ^	5	–	3	9	–	5
No. 18 Youngstown State	5	–	3	8	–	4
Southern Illinois	5	–	3	7	–	5
Missouri State	5	–	3	5	–	7
Illinois State	4	–	4	5	–	6
South Dakota	3	–	5	4	–	8
Northern Iowa	3	–	5	7	–	5
Western Illinois	2	–	6	4	–	8
Indiana State	0	–	8	1	–	11
$ – Conference champion; ^ – FCS playoff participant; Rankings from The Sports Network poll

The 2013 South Dakota Coyotes football team represented the University of South Dakota in the 2013 NCAA Division I FCS football season. They were led by second year head coach Joe Glenn and played their home games in the DakotaDome. They were a member of the Missouri Valley Football Conference. They finished the season 4–8, 3–5 in MFVC play to finish in a tie for seventh place.

== Schedule ==
Date	Time	Opponent	Site	TV	Result	Attendance
August 31	2:00 pm	UC Davis*	DakotaDome; Vermillion, SD	Midco SN	W 10–7	8,012
September 7	6:00 pm	at Kansas*	Memorial Stadium; Lawrence, KS	ESPN3	L 14–31	41,920
September 21	6:00 pm	at No. 25 Northern Arizona*	Walkup Skydome; Flagstaff, AZ	FSAZ+/NAU-TV	L 16–21	7,855
September 28	3:00 pm	at Western Illinois	Hanson Field; Macomb, IL	WIUS*	L 10–24	5,732
October 5	2:00 pm	Missouri State	DakotaDome; Vermillion, SD	Midco SN	W 17–14	9,758
October 12	1:00 pm	Indiana State	DakotaDome; Vermillion, SD		W 17–14	6,710
October 19	4:00 pm	at No. 11 Northern Iowa	UNI-Dome; Cedar Falls, IA		W 38–31 ^{2OT}	11,121
October 26	1:00 pm	at Illinois State	Hancock Stadium; Normal, IL		L 14–28	11,868
November 2	1:00 pm	No. 11 Youngstown State	DakotaDome; Vermillion, SD	ESPN3	L 34–38	6,676
November 9	1:00 pm	No. 10 Montana*	DakotaDome; Vermillion, SD	Midco SN	L 27–31	6,567
November 16	1:00 pm	No. 19 South Dakota State	DakotaDome; Vermillion, SD (rivalry)	Midco SN	L 12–27	10,845
November 23	2:30 pm	at No. 1 North Dakota State	Fargodome; Fargo, ND	Midco SN	L 0–42	18,234
*Non-conference game; Rankings from The Sports Network at time of game Poll released prior to the game; All times are in Central time

- Source: Schedule

*Game aired on a tape delayed basis
