= 2013 Southern Illinois Salukis football team =

American college football season

2013 Southern Illinois Salukis football
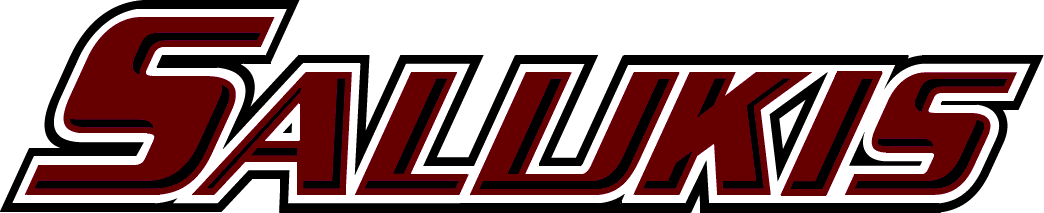
- Conference: Missouri Valley Football Conference
- Record: 7–5 (5–3 MVFC)
- Head coach: Dale Lennon (6th season)
- Offensive coordinator: Kalen DeBoer (4th season)
- Defensive coordinator: Bubba Schweigert (6th season)
- Home stadium: Saluki Stadium

2013 Missouri Valley Football Conference standings
	Conf.			Overall
Team	W		L	W		L
No. 1 North Dakota State $^	8	–	0	15	–	0
No. 13 South Dakota State ^	5	–	3	9	–	5
No. 18 Youngstown State	5	–	3	8	–	4
Southern Illinois	5	–	3	7	–	5
Missouri State	5	–	3	5	–	7
Illinois State	4	–	4	5	–	6
South Dakota	3	–	5	4	–	8
Northern Iowa	3	–	5	7	–	5
Western Illinois	2	–	6	4	–	8
Indiana State	0	–	8	1	–	11
$ – Conference champion; ^ – FCS playoff participant; Rankings from The Sports Network poll

The 2013 Southern Illinois Salukis football team represented Southern Illinois University Carbondale as a member of the Missouri Valley Football Conference (MVFC) during the 2013 NCAA Division I FCS football season. Led by sixth-year head coach Dale Lennon, the Salukis compiled an overall record of 7–5 with a mark of 5–3 in conference play, placing in a four-way tie for second in the MVFC. Southern Illinois played home games at Saluki Stadium in Carbondale, Illinois.

== Schedule ==
Date	Time	Opponent	Site	TV	Result	Attendance
August 31	11:00 am	at Illinois*	Memorial Stadium; Champaign, IL	BTN	L 34–42	42,175
September 7	6:00 pm	No. 14 Eastern Illinois*	Saluki Stadium; Carbondale, IL		L 37–40 ^{2OT}	10,038
September 14	2:00 pm	Charleston (WV)*	Saluki Stadium; Carbondale, IL		W 31–10	7,231
September 21	1:00 pm	vs. Southeast Missouri State*	Busch Stadium; St. Louis, MO		W 36–19	14,618
September 28	6:00 pm	Youngstown State	Saluki Stadium; Carbondale, IL	ESPN3	L 27–28	11,408
October 5	2:00 pm	at No. 7 South Dakota State	Coughlin–Alumni Stadium; Brookings, SD	ESPN3	W 27–24	11,250
October 12	4:00 pm	at No. 4 Northern Iowa	UNI-Dome; Cedar Falls, IA		W 24–17 ^{OT}	16,423
October 19	2:00 pm	No. 1 North Dakota State^{†}	Saluki Stadium; Carbondale, IL	ESPN3	L 10–31	11,121
November 2	1:00 pm	at Western Illinois	Hanson Field; Macomb, IL	WIUS^	W 34–28	3,104
November 9	2:00 pm	Missouri State	Saluki Stadium; Carbondale, IL		L 27–37	5,642
November 16	2:00 pm	Illinois State	Saluki Stadium; Carbondale, IL	CSNC	W 24–17	5,885
November 23	1:00 pm	at Indiana State	Memorial Stadium; Terre Haute, IN		W 31–9	2,988
*Non-conference game; ^{†}Homecoming; Rankings from The Sports Network Poll released prior to the game; All times are in Central time

^Game aired on a tape delayed basis
