= 2013 South Dakota State Jackrabbits football team =

American college football season

2013 South Dakota State Jackrabbits football

NCAA Division I Second Round, L 17–41 at Eastern Washington
- Conference: Missouri Valley Football Conference

Ranking
- Sports Network: No. 13
- FCS Coaches: No. 14
- Record: 9–5 (5–3 MVFC)
- Head coach: John Stiegelmeier (17th season)
- Offensive coordinator: Eric Eidsness (8th season)
- Defensive coordinator: Clint Brown (5th season)
- Home stadium: Coughlin–Alumni Stadium

2013 Missouri Valley Football Conference standings
	Conf.			Overall
Team	W		L	W		L
No. 1 North Dakota State $^	8	–	0	15	–	0
No. 13 South Dakota State ^	5	–	3	9	–	5
No. 18 Youngstown State	5	–	3	8	–	4
Southern Illinois	5	–	3	7	–	5
Missouri State	5	–	3	5	–	7
Illinois State	4	–	4	5	–	6
South Dakota	3	–	5	4	–	8
Northern Iowa	3	–	5	7	–	5
Western Illinois	2	–	6	4	–	8
Indiana State	0	–	8	1	–	11
$ – Conference champion; ^ – FCS playoff participant; Rankings from The Sports Network poll

The 2013 South Dakota State Jackrabbits football team represented South Dakota State University as a member of the Missouri Valley Football Conference (MVFC) during the 2013 NCAA Division I FCS football season. Led by 17th-year head coach John Stiegelmeier, the Jackrabbits compiled an overall record of 9–5 with a mark of 5–3 in conference play, placing in a four-way tie for second in the MVFC. South Dakota State received an at–large bid to the NCAA Division I Football Championship playoffs, where the Jackrabbits defeated Northern Arizona in the first round before falling to Eastern Washington in the second round. The team played home games at Coughlin–Alumni Stadium in Brookings, South Dakota.

== Schedule ==
Date	Time	Opponent	Rank	Site	TV	Result	Attendance
August 31	6:00 pm	Butler*	No. 6	Coughlin–Alumni Stadium; Brookings, SD	Midco SN	W 55–14	9,729
September 7	6:00 pm	at North Dakota*	No. 6	Alerus Center; Grand Forks, ND		W 35–28	10,038
September 14	6:00 pm	Southeastern Louisiana*	No. 6	Coughlin–Alumni Stadium; Brookings, SD		W 34–26	13,456
September 21	2:30 pm	at Nebraska*	No. 6	Memorial Stadium; Lincoln, NE	BTN	L 20–59	90,614
September 28	2:00 pm	No. 1 North Dakota State	No. 6	Coughlin–Alumni Stadium; Brookings, SD (Dakota Marker)	Midco SN	L 0–20	16,498
October 5	2:00 pm	Southern Illinois	No. 7	Coughlin–Alumni Stadium; Brookings, SD	ESPN3	L 24–27	11,250
October 12	3:00 pm	at Western Illinois	No. 13	Hanson Field; Macomb, IL	ESPN3	W 38–14	10,232
October 19	1:00 pm	at Missouri State	No. 15	Plaster Sports Complex; Springfield, MO	ESPN3	L 21–35	12,321
October 26	2:00 pm	No. 17 Northern Iowa	No. 25	Coughlin–Alumni Stadium; Brookings, SD	Midco SN	W 37–34 ^{2OT}	7,912
November 9	2:00 pm	Indiana State	No. 19	Coughlin–Alumni Stadium; Brookings, SD		W 29–0	5,317
November 16	1:00 pm	at South Dakota	No. 19	DakotaDome; Vermillion, SD	Midco SN	W 27–12	10,845
November 23	1:00 pm	at No. 15 Youngstown State	No. 16	Stambaugh Stadium; Youngstown, OH	ESPN3	W 42–13	8,973
November 30	7:00 pm	at No. 8 Northern Arizona*	No. 13	Walkup Skydome; Flagstaff, AZ (NCAA Division I First Round)	ESPN3	W 26–7	5,077
December 7	3:00 pm	at No. 3 Eastern Washington*	No. 13	Roos Field; Cheney, WA (NCAA Division I Second Round)	ESPN3	L 17–41	6,127
*Non-conference game; Rankings from The Sports Network Poll released prior to the game; All times are in Central time

The Dakota Marker matchup against North Dakota State set a new single-game home attendance record (16,498).

== Rankings ==
Ranking movements Legend: ██ Increase in ranking ██ Decrease in ranking т = Tied with team above or below
	Week														
Poll	Pre	1	2	3	4	5	6	7	8	9	10	11	12	13	Final
Sports Network	6	6	6	6	6	7	13	15	25	19	19	19	16	13	13
Coaches	7	7	6	6	6	9	18	18	24–T	20	20	19	17	13	14
