= 2013 Youngstown State Penguins football team =

American college football season

2013 Youngstown State Penguins football
- Conference: Missouri Valley Football Conference

Ranking
- Sports Network: No. 18
- FCS Coaches: No. 19
- Record: 8–4 (5–3 MVFC)
- Head coach: Eric Wolford (4th season)
- Offensive coordinator: Shane Montgomery (4th season)
- Defensive coordinator: Joe Tresey (2nd season)
- Home stadium: Stambaugh Stadium

2013 Missouri Valley Football Conference standings
	Conf.			Overall
Team	W		L	W		L
No. 1 North Dakota State $^	8	–	0	15	–	0
No. 13 South Dakota State ^	5	–	3	9	–	5
No. 18 Youngstown State	5	–	3	8	–	4
Southern Illinois	5	–	3	7	–	5
Missouri State	5	–	3	5	–	7
Illinois State	4	–	4	5	–	6
South Dakota	3	–	5	4	–	8
Northern Iowa	3	–	5	7	–	5
Western Illinois	2	–	6	4	–	8
Indiana State	0	–	8	1	–	11
$ – Conference champion; ^ – FCS playoff participant; Rankings from The Sports Network poll

The 2013 Youngstown State Penguins football team represented Youngstown State University as a member of the Missouri Valley Football Conference (MVFC) during the 2013 NCAA Division I FCS football season. Led by fourth-year head coach Eric Wolford, the Penguins compiled an overall record of 8–4 with a mark of 5–3 in conference play, placing in a four-way tie for second in the MVFC. Youngstown State played their home games at Stambaugh Stadium in Youngstown, Ohio.

== Schedule ==
Date	Time	Opponent	Rank	Site	TV	Result	Attendance
August 29	7:30 pm	Dayton*		Stambaugh Stadium; Youngstown, OH	My YTV^	W 28–10	12,018
September 7	4:00 pm	Morehead State*		Stambaugh Stadium; Youngstown, OH	My YTV^	W 67–13	13,226
September 14	2:00 pm	at Michigan State*	No. 24	Spartan Stadium; East Lansing, MI	BTN	L 17–55	71,626
September 21	4:00 pm	Duquesne*		Stambaugh Stadium; Youngstown, OH	My YTV^	W 59–17	16,958
September 28	7:00 pm	at Southern Illinois		Saluki Stadium; Carbondale, IL	WBCB, ESPN3	W 28–27	11,408
October 5	3:00 pm	at Indiana State		Memorial Stadium; Terre Haute, IN	WBCB	W 35–24	8,000
October 12	7:00 pm	Illinois State	No. 18	Stambaugh Stadium; Youngstown, OH	ESPN3, My YTV^	W 59–21	16,593
October 19	4:00 pm	Western Illinois	No. 16	Stambaugh Stadium; Youngstown, OH	ESPN3, My YTV^	W 24–14	13,607
November 2	2:00 pm	South Dakota	No. 11	DakotaDome; Vermillion, SD	ESPN3	W 38–34	6,676
November 9	5:00 pm	at Northern Iowa	No. 9	UNI-Dome; Cedar Falls, IA	PSN	L 20–22	10,034
November 16	2:00 pm	No. 1 North Dakota State	No. 15	Stambaugh Stadium; Youngstown, OH	NBCND, ESPN3	L 17–35	13,164
November 23	2:00 pm	No. 16 South Dakota State	No. 15	Stambaugh Stadium; Youngstown, OH	My YTV, ESPN3	L 13–42	8,973
*Non-conference game; Rankings from The Sports Network Poll released prior to the game; All times are in Eastern time

^Game aired on a tape delayed basis

== Rankings ==
Ranking movements Legend: ██ Increase in ranking ██ Decrease in ranking RV = Received votes
	Week														
Poll	Pre	1	2	3	4	5	6	7	8	9	10	11	12	13	Final
Sports Network	RV	RV	24	RV	RV	RV	18	16	13	11	9	15	15	17	18
Coaches	24	24	23	RV	RV	22	16	15	12	10	8	15	18	19	19
