= Clay Patterson =

American college football coach

Current position
- Title: Offensive coordinator & quarterbacks coach
- Team: Kent State
- Conference: MAC

Biographical details
- Born: Morris, Oklahoma, U.S.

Playing career
- 1999–2000: Northeastern Oklahoma A&M
- 2001–2003: Southeastern Oklahoma State
- Position: Wide receiver

Coaching career (HC unless noted)
- 2003–2005: Southeastern Oklahoma State (WR)
- 2006: Tarleton State (WR)
- 2007–2012: Texas A&M–Kingsville (OC/QB)
- 2013–2015: Trinity Valley (OC/QB)
- 2016–2017: Northeastern Oklahoma A&M
- 2018–2021: Minnesota (TE)
- 2022: Colorado (TE)
- 2022: Colorado (OC/TE)
- 2023: South Florida (TE)
- 2024: Kent State (co-OC/WR)
- 2025–present: Kent State (OC/QB)

Head coaching record
- Overall: 14–8
- Bowls: 0–1
- Tournaments: 2–1 (SWJCFC playoffs)

Accomplishments and honors

Championships
- 1 SWJCFC (2017)

Clay Patterson is an American college football coach. He is the co-offensive coordinator and wide receivers coach for Kent State University, positions he has held since 2024. Patterson served as the head football coach at Northeastern Oklahoma A&M College from 2016 to 2017.

== Playing career ==
Patterson first played college football as a wide receiver at Northeastern Oklahoma A&M College before transferring and finishing his career at Southeastern Oklahoma State University.

== Coaching career ==
Patterson began his coaching career as the wide receivers coach at his alma mater of Southeastern Oklahoma State. He had stints at Tarleton State, Texas A&M Kingsville and Trinity Valley Community College before being hired as the head coach at Northeastern Oklahoma A&M. In 2018 he was hired by P. J. Fleck to be the tight ends coach at the University of Minnesota. In 2022, Patterson was hired as the tight ends coach and pass game coordinator at Colorado. Following an 0–5 start to the 2022 season, Colorado fired head coach Karl Dorell and named offensive coordinator Mike Sanford Jr. the interim head coach, and Sanford promoted Patterson to the open offensive coordinator position.

== Head coaching record ==
| Year | Team | Overall | Conference | Standing | Bowl/playoffs |
|---|---|---|---|---|---|
Northeastern Oklahoma A&M Golden Norsemen (Southwest Junior College Football Conference) (2016–2017)
| 2016 | Northeastern Oklahoma A&M | 5–5 | 4–3 | T–2nd | L SWJCFC semifinal |
| 2017 | Northeastern Oklahoma A&M | 9–3 | 5–2 | T–1st | W SWJCFC championship, L Midwest Bowl Classic |
| Northeastern Oklahoma A&M: | | 14–8 | 9–5 | | |
| Total: | | 14–8 | | | |
National championship Conference title Conference division title or championship game berth
