= Ted Bolser =

American football player (born 1990)

No. 81, 83
- Position: Tight end

Personal information
- Born: October 22, 1990 (age 36); Cincinnati, Ohio, U.S.
- Listed height: 6 ft 5 in (1.96 m)
- Listed weight: 249 lb (113 kg)

Career information
- High school: Indian Hill (Indian Hill, Ohio)
- College: Indiana
- NFL draft: 2014: 7th round, 217th overall pick

Career history
- Washington Redskins (2014)*; Tampa Bay Buccaneers (2014)*; Arizona Cardinals (2014–2015)*
- * Offseason or practice squad member only
- Stats at Pro Football Reference

Theodore Richard Bolser (born October 22, 1990) is an American former football tight end. He was selected by the Washington Redskins in the seventh round of the 2014 NFL draft. He played college football at Indiana. He was also a member of the Arizona Cardinals and Tampa Bay Buccaneers.

== College career ==
Bolser was a four-year starter for the Indiana Hoosiers football team (2010-2013), first for head coach Bill Lynch and then for Kevin Wilson. In 47 games with the Hoosiers, he caught 117 passes for 1,337 yards and 15 touchdowns.

== Professional career ==
=== Washington Redskins ===
Bolser signed a four-year contract with the Redskins on May 16, 2014. The Redskins released Bolser on August 29, 2014. After clearing waivers, he was signed to the team's practice squad, two days later. He was waived from the practice squad on October 7.

=== Tampa Bay Buccaneers ===
The Tampa Bay Buccaneers signed Bolser to their practice squad on November 3, 2014, but was released on November 26, 2014.

=== Arizona Cardinals ===
The Arizona Cardinals signed Bolser to their practice squad on December 30, 2014. He signed a futures deal with the Cardinals on January 5, 2015. On August 6, 2015, he was released by the Cardinals due to injury. A few days later, Bolser took to Twitter to announce that his injuries had forced him to retire from playing football.
