= Mike Sanford Sr. =

American football player and coach (born 1955)

Mike Sanford
Current position
- Title: Head coach
- Team: Faith Lutheran HS (NV)
- Conference: Sunset 4A Region
- Record: 0–0

Biographical details
- Born: April 20, 1955 (age 71); Los Altos, California, U.S.

Playing career
- 1973–1976: USC
- Position: Quarterback

Coaching career (HC unless noted)
- 1977: USC (GA)
- 1978: San Diego City (DC)
- 1979–1980: Army (WR/TE)
- 1981–1982: VMI (QB/WR/TE)
- 1983–1984: Long Beach State (QB/WR)
- 1985–1986: Long Beach State (OC)
- 1987–1988: Purdue (QB)
- 1989–1996: USC (WR)
- 1997–1998: Notre Dame (QB)
- 1999–2001: San Diego Chargers (WR)
- 2002: Stanford (OC/QB)
- 2003–2004: Utah (OC/RB)
- 2005–2009: UNLV
- 2010–2011: Louisville (AHC/OC/TE)
- 2012: Utah State (AHC/RB/TE)
- 2013–2016: Indiana State
- 2017–2018: Western Kentucky (RB/ST)
- 2019: Utah State (consultant)
- 2020–present: Faith Lutheran HS (NV)

Head coaching record
- Overall: 34–73 (college); 0–0 (high school)

Accomplishments and honors

Awards
- AFCA Regional Coach Of The Year (2014)

Michael Charles Sanford (born April 20, 1955) is an American football coach and former player. He served as the head football coach at University of Nevada, Las Vegas (UNLV) from 2005 to 2009 and at Indiana State University from 2013 to 2016. He is a graduate of the University of Southern California (USC), where he played quarterback for the Trojans from 1973 through 1976. He is the father of former Western Kentucky head coach Mike Sanford Jr.

== Head coaching career ==
=== UNLV ===
On December 6, 2004, UNLV hired Sanford as the school's ninth head coach, taking over for John Robinson who went 2–9 his final year. Sanford inherited a program in decline. Some had blamed the program's problems on an inability to keep local talent at home. It was hoped that Sanford would reverse the fortunes of the long-suffering program with this new policy. His first two years at the helm produced just four total wins, on par with John Robinson's final season total.

Sanford's Rebels achieved one of the biggest victories in UNLV football history, a 23–20 overtime win at 15th-ranked Arizona State on September 13, 2008. Sanford said it was the biggest win of his coaching career.

At the end of the 2009 season, UNLV announced it had fired Sanford. He left the Rebels after five seasons with an overall mark of 16–43.

=== Indiana State ===
On December 14, 2012, Indiana State hired Sanford as the school's twenty-fourth head coach, taking over for Trent Miles who went 7–4 his final year.

The ensuing regime change for the Sycamores led to a season fraught with a struggle to adjust to the system implemented by Sanford and his new staff, multiple injuries to several key starters, and many off-field issues which led to Indiana State losing all but one game that season (a 70–7 victory over Quincy). Despite finishing the 2013 season with a disappointing 1–11 record, Sanford's Sycamores were more competitive than the overall record might indicate, with close losses to Purdue, Tennessee Tech, Youngstown State, South Dakota, and Western Illinois.

The 2014 season, however, showed a marked improvement by Indiana State in their second year under Sanford. After suffering an early defeat at the hands of Big Ten member Indiana University; the Sycamores followed a dominant performance against Tennessee Tech by completing an upset victory over the Division I FBS and historic rival Ball State Cardinals to reclaim the Victory Bell for the first time since 1987.

Sanford's leadership led to not only a record-setting senior season by quarterback Mike Perish, but a regular season record of 7–5 (4–4 in MVFC); as well as maintaining a Top 25 ranking since Week 4 (27 September). The Sycamores were 5–3 against ranked FCS teams and won their opening round NCAA playoffs game before falling to Chattanooga in the second round of the playoffs. The season concluded with an 8–6 record, the best for Indiana State in thirty years.

Indiana State took a step back in 2015 despite entering the season with high expectations following the successful 2014 campaign.

Following the graduation of starting quarterback Mike Perish, Sanford opted to start redshirt sophomore Matt Adam at quarterback. This ultimately forced ISU to alter the successful offensive game plan from the previous season and install a more rush-oriented offense tailored to Adam's skill set. Despite starting the season 4–2, the Sycamores suffered several devastating injuries that wore away at both the depth and consistency and led to ISU falling to North Dakota State, Illinois State, Northern Iowa, and Western Illinois in consecutive games. The Sycamores concluded their season with a 27–24 victory over Youngstown State to finish 5–6.

The 2016 season witnessed another disappointing regression. Starting quarterback Matt Adam was ruled academically ineligible to play and led to a competition that consisted of three inexperienced quarterbacks, which ultimately was won by Isaac Harker. Sparked by a potent passing game, the Sycamores started the season with a 3–1 record but ultimately faltered (blowing several leads) and lost six of their last seven games. Despite the poor 4–7 record the Sycamores notched their first victory over rival Illinois State for the first time in six years.

Sanford resigned as head coach of Indiana State December 16, 2016, citing a "special opportunity" following the appointment of his son, Mike Sanford Jr., as head coach of Western Kentucky. Sanford was 18–30 after four years at ISU.

== Assistant coaching career ==
Sanford began his coaching career as a graduate assistant at USC in 1977. Since then, he has served as an assistant coach for numerous teams in the collegiate and professional ranks, including San Diego City College, the United States Military Academy, Virginia Military Institute, Long Beach State, Purdue, USC, Notre Dame, the San Diego Chargers and Stanford. In 2003 Urban Meyer hired Sanford as his offensive coordinator at Utah. That year, the Utes won the Mountain West Conference Championship and won the Liberty Bowl. The next year, the Utes repeated as conference champs and finished the season 12–0, including a win over Pittsburgh in the Fiesta Bowl. Sanford's offense averaged 45.3 points a game, and quarterback Alex Smith was MWC Player of the Year as well as a finalist for the Heisman Trophy. The following spring, Smith was the first overall pick in the 2005 NFL draft, selected by the San Francisco 49ers.

=== Louisville ===
On December 22, 2009, Sanford was named offensive coordinator and assistant head coach at the University of Louisville.

After a lackluster offensive performance against Marshall on October 1, 2011, Sanford did not travel with the Cardinals for their next game, against North Carolina. He did not attend any of the practices in the week leading up to the game. Quarterbacks coach Shawn Watson served as offensive play-caller for that game. CBSSports.com's Brett McMurphy reported that Sanford had been fired and replaced by Watson. However, The Courier-Journal's Rick Bozich reported that Sanford was still with the team, but may be demoted to a position coach. Bozich later confirmed that Sanford was no longer offensive coordinator.

The following Monday, October 10, Strong announced that Watson would serve as offensive coordinator for the remainder of the season, but that Sanford would remain on the coaching staff in another capacity. He also denied rumors that there had been an altercation between them during the week.

On October 22, 2011, Strong announced that Sanford was no longer with the program.

=== Utah State (first stint) ===
Sanford joined the Utah State coaching staff in March 2012. He served as the assistant head coach and running backs/tight ends coach. Sanford previously worked with head coach Gary Andersen at the University of Utah.

=== Western Kentucky ===
Sanford joined the Western Kentucky coaching staff in December 2016. He served as the running backs coach and special teams coordinator under his son, Mike Sanford Jr.

=== Utah State (second stint) ===
Sanford joined the Utah State coaching staff for the 2019 season. He served as a consultant under head coach Gary Anderson and offensive coordinator Mike Sanford Jr., his son.

== Head coaching record ==
Year	Team	Overall	Conference	Standing	Bowl/playoffs	TSN^{#}	Coaches^{°}
UNLV Rebels (Mountain West Conference) (2005–2009)
2005	UNLV	2–9	1–7	9th			
2006	UNLV	2–10	1–7	T–8th			
2007	UNLV	2–10	1–7	9th			
2008	UNLV	5–7	2–6	T–6th			
2009	UNLV	5–7	3–5	6th			
UNLV:		16–43	8–32				
Indiana State Sycamores (Missouri Valley Football Conference) (2013–2016)
2013	Indiana State	1–11	0–8	9th			
2014	Indiana State	8–6	4–4	T–5th	NCAA Division I Second Round	18	19
2015	Indiana State	5–6	3–5	T–6th			
2016	Indiana State	4–7	2–6	T–8th			
Indiana State:		18–30	9–23				
Total:		34–73					
