= 2013 Indiana State Sycamores football team =

American college football season

2013 Indiana State Sycamores football
- Conference: Missouri Valley Football Conference
- Record: 1–11 (0–8 MVFC)
- Head coach: Mike Sanford Sr. (1st season)
- Offensive coordinator: Brian Shepperd (1st season)
- Defensive coordinator: Brian Cabral (1st season)
- Home stadium: Memorial Stadium

2013 Missouri Valley Football Conference standings
	Conf.			Overall
Team	W		L	W		L
No. 1 North Dakota State $^	8	–	0	15	–	0
No. 13 South Dakota State ^	5	–	3	9	–	5
No. 18 Youngstown State	5	–	3	8	–	4
Southern Illinois	5	–	3	7	–	5
Missouri State	5	–	3	5	–	7
Illinois State	4	–	4	5	–	6
South Dakota	3	–	5	4	–	8
Northern Iowa	3	–	5	7	–	5
Western Illinois	2	–	6	4	–	8
Indiana State	0	–	8	1	–	11
$ – Conference champion; ^ – FCS playoff participant; Rankings from The Sports Network poll

The 2013 Indiana State Sycamores football team represented Indiana State University as a member of the Missouri Valley Football Conference (MVFC) during the 2013 NCAA Division I FCS football season. Led by first-year head coach Mike Sanford Sr., the Sycamores compiled an overall record of 1–11 with a mark of 0–8 in conference play, placing last out of ten teams in the MVFC. Indiana State played home games at Memorial Stadium in Terre Haute, Indiana.

== Schedule ==
Date	Time	Opponent	Site	TV	Result	Attendance
August 29	7:00 pm	at Indiana*	Memorial Stadium; Bloomington, IN	BTN	L 35–73	40,278
September 7	12:00 pm	at Purdue*	Ross–Ade Stadium; West Lafayette, IN	BTN	L 14–20	50,165
September 14	3:00 pm	Quincy*	Memorial Stadium; Terre Haute, IN		W 70–7	7,002
September 28	8:00 pm	at Tennessee Tech*	Tucker Stadium; Cookeville, TN		L 37–38	8,970
October 5	3:00 pm	Youngstown State^{†}	Memorial Stadium; Terre Haute, IN	WBCB	L 24–35	8,000
October 12	2;00 PM	at South Dakota	DakotaDome; Vermillion, SD		L 14–17	6,710
October 19	2:00 pm	at Illinois State	Hancock Stadium; Normal, IL	ESPN3	L 14–55	8,262
October 26	3:00 pm	No. 1 North Dakota State	Memorial Stadium; Terre Haute, IN	ESPN3	L 10–56	5,009
November 2	2:00 pm	at Missouri State	Plaster Sports Complex; Springfield, MO		L 7–49	6,648
November 9	3:00 pm	at No. 19 South Dakota State	Coughlin–Alumni Stadium; Brookings, SD		L 0–29	5,317
November 16	2:00 pm	Western Illinois	Memorial Stadium; Terre Haute, IN		L 14–21	4,109
November 23	2:00 pm	Southern Illinois	Memorial Stadium; Terre Haute, IN		L 9–31	2,988
*Non-conference game; ^{†}Homecoming; Rankings from The Sports Network Poll released prior to the game; All times are in Eastern time
