= Conor Riley =

American football coach

Dallas Cowboys
- Title: Offensive line coach

Personal information
- Born: Omaha, Nebraska, U.S.
- Listed height: 6 ft 3 in (1.91 m)
- Listed weight: 311 lb (141 kg)

Career information
- College: Nebraska Omaha

Career history
- Nebraska Omaha (2003–2005) Graduate assistant; Concordia–St. Paul (2006) Offensive line coach; Nebraska Omaha (2007–2010) Offensive line coach; Sacramento State (2011–2012) Offensive line coach; North Dakota State (2013) Tight ends coach & fullbacks coach; North Dakota State (2014–2018) Offensive line coach; Kansas State (2019–2023) Offensive line coach; Kansas State (2024) Offensive coordinator & offensive line coach; Dallas Cowboys (2025–present) Offensive line coach

Awards and highlights
- 5× NCAA FCS national champion (2013, 2014, 2015, 2017, 2018)

Conor Riley is an American football coach who is currently the offensive line coach for the Dallas Cowboys of the National Football League (NFL). Riley previously served as the offensive coordinator and offensive line coach at Kansas State University, where he developed a reputation as one of the top offensive line coaches in college football.

== Playing career ==
Riley played offensive line at Nebraska Omaha from 1999 to 2002, after transferring from the United States Air Force Academy and the University of Kansas. He was twice named the North Central Conference’s outstanding lineman and earned All-America honors as a senior.

Pre-draft measurables
Height	Weight
6 ft 3 1/4 in (1.91 m)	311 lb (141 kg)
All values from Pro Day

== Coaching career ==
=== Early career ===
Riley began his collegiate coaching career at his alma mater, the University of Nebraska Omaha, where he served as a graduate assistant from 2003 to 2005. He later coached offensive lines at Concordia–St. Paul (2006), Nebraska Omaha (2007–2010), and Sacramento State (2011–2012).

=== North Dakota State ===
In 2013, Riley joined North Dakota State as tight ends and fullbacks coach, before taking over the offensive line in 2014. During his six seasons with the Bison, Riley helped lead the program to five FCS national championships. His offensive lines were consistently ranked among the best in the country in rushing yards and sacks allowed. In 2018, his line set school and Missouri Valley Football Conference records for total offense, rushing touchdowns, and points scored.

=== Kansas State ===
Riley was hired as the offensive line coach at Kansas State in 2019 and was promoted to offensive coordinator in 2024. Under his leadership, the Wildcats averaged over 34 points per game in his final two seasons, ranked in the top 20 nationally in scoring, and achieved over 200 rushing yards per game in consecutive seasons for the first time in two decades.

He coached 15 All-Big 12 offensive linemen during his tenure, including Cooper Beebe, who earned back-to-back Big 12 Offensive Lineman of the Year honors and became a Consensus All-American in 2023. Riley’s offensive line allowed fewer than 2.0 sacks per game in each of his five seasons, the longest such streak in Kansas State history.

Riley served as interim offensive coordinator during the Wildcats' win over NC State in the 2023 Pop-Tarts Bowl, where the offense tallied 257 rushing yards and 435 total yards against one of the top-ranked defenses in the nation.

=== Dallas Cowboys ===
In 2025, Riley was hired as the offensive line coach for the Dallas Cowboys.

== Personal life ==
Riley is a native of Omaha, Nebraska. He and his wife, Christy, have two daughters, Cate and Claire.
