= David Kenney (Canadian football) =

American gridiron football player (born 1995)

No. 49, 98
- Position: Defensive end

Personal information
- Born: February 6, 1995 (age 31)
- Listed height: 6 ft 2 in (1.88 m)
- Listed weight: 250 lb (113 kg)

Career information
- High school: Pike (Indianapolis, Indiana)
- College: Indiana (2013–2014); Illinois State (2015)

Career history
- Tampa Bay Buccaneers (2019)*; Winnipeg Blue Bombers (2019)*; Saskatchewan Roughriders (2022)
- * Offseason or practice squad member only

Awards and highlights
- Grey Cup champion (2019)

Career CFL statistics
- Games played: 1
- Tackles: 2
- Stats at CFL.ca

David Khristopher Kenney III (born February 6, 1995) is an American former professional football defensive end who played for the Winnipeg Blue Bombers and Saskatchewan Roughriders of the Canadian Football League (CFL). He played college football for the Indiana Hoosiers and Illinois State Redbirds.

== Early life ==
Kenney was born on February 6, 1995. He attended Pike High School in Indianapolis, Indiana. As a senior, Kenney had 76 tackles, including 19.5 for loss, nine sacks, four pass breakups and one forced fumble. A four-star recruit, he committed to play college football at Indiana University.

== College career ==
Kenney played college football for the Indiana Hoosiers from 2013 to 2014 and Illinois State Redbirds in 2015. As a true freshman, he had nine tackles and one pass deflection in seven games. The following year, Kenney left the school due to academic issues. In 2015, he transferred to Illinois State University. During the lone season at Illinois State, Kenney registered 11 tackles and one sack in seven games. In January 2016, head coach, Brock Spack, confirmed that he was dismissed from the team.

== Professional career ==
=== Tampa Bay Buccaneers ===
On May 13, 2019, Kenney signed with the Tampa Bay Buccaneers after last playing football in 2015 for Illinois State. On August 31, he was waived by the team.

=== Winnipeg Blue Bombers ===
On September 24, 2019, Kenney was signed to the practice roster of the Winnipeg Blue Bombers of the Canadian Football League (CFL). As he member of the practice roster the Blue Bombers won the 107th Grey Cup. On January 23, 2020, Kenney was re-signed by the team. On August 26, he was released. On January 29, 2021, Kenney was re-signed again. On July 20, he was released by the team.

=== Saskatchewan Roughriders ===
On February 28, 2022, Kenney was signed by the Saskatchewan Roughriders. He played in one game against the Toronto Argonauts, recording two tackles. On July 23, Kenney was placed on the injured list. On May 17, 2023, he was released by the team.
