= Mike Sanford Jr. =

American football player and coach (born 1982)

Mike Sanford
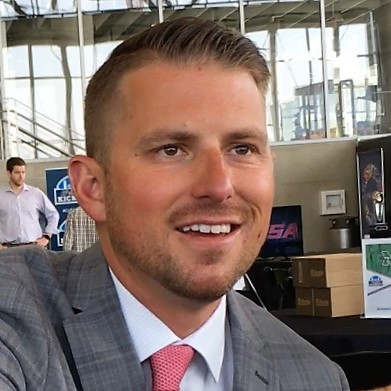
- Sanford at 2018 C-USA Kickoff

Current position
- Title: Head coach
- Team: Valor Christian HS (CO)
- Record: 0–0

Biographical details
- Born: February 4, 1982 (age 44); Lexington, Virginia, U.S.

Playing career
- 2000–2004: Boise State
- Position: Quarterback

Coaching career (HC unless noted)
- 2005–2006: UNLV (GA)
- 2007–2008: Stanford (OA)
- 2009: Yale (RC/TE/FB)
- 2010: Western Kentucky (QB)
- 2011: Stanford (RB)
- 2012: Stanford (RC/RB)
- 2013: Stanford (RC/QB/WR)
- 2014: Boise State (OC/QB)
- 2015–2016: Notre Dame (OC/QB)
- 2017–2018: Western Kentucky
- 2019: Utah State (OC/QB)
- 2020–2021: Minnesota (OC/QB)
- 2022: Colorado (OC/QB)
- 2022: Colorado (interim HC)
- 2025–present: Valor Christian HS (CO)

Head coaching record
- Overall: 10–16 (college)
- Bowls: 0–1

Michael Gunnar William Sanford (born February 4, 1982) is an American football coach and former quarterback. He is the current head coach of Valor Christian High School in Highlands Ranch, Colorado and was the former interim head coach for the Colorado Buffaloes. He played college football at Boise State from 2000 to 2004. He then served as the head coach of the Western Kentucky Hilltoppers (2017–2018).

He is the son of former UNLV and Indiana State head coach, Mike Sanford.

== Career ==
Previously, Sanford served as the head coach for Western Kentucky and offensive coordinator for Notre Dame. He was the offensive coordinator of his alma mater Boise State, where he played quarterback. Sanford also served numerous positions at Stanford.

On November 25, 2018, after completing his second season at the helm of the program, Western Kentucky fired Sanford. Sanford was hired by Utah State as their offensive coordinator after they rehired Gary Andersen following head coach Matt Wells' departure for Texas Tech.

In January 2020, Sanford was hired as the offensive coordinator and quarterbacks coach at the University of Minnesota.

In December 2021, Sanford was hired as the offensive coordinator at the University of Colorado Boulder. On October 2, 2022, Sanford became the interim head coach after head coach Karl Dorrell was fired following a 0–5 start to the season. He won his Colorado head coaching debut by defeating the California Golden Bears 20–13 in overtime. Sanford then proceeded to lose his next six games as the Buffaloes interim head coach.

Following his replacement at Colorado by Deion Sanders, Sanford took a volunteer coaching position at Mead High School in Longmont, Colorado, a Denver suburb, under Jason Klatt, the brother of television football analyst Joel Klatt.

On February 28, 2025, Sanford was hired as the head coach of Valor Christian High School.

== Head coaching record ==
=== College ===
Year	Team	Overall	Conference	Standing	Bowl/playoffs
Western Kentucky Hilltoppers (Conference USA) (2017–2018)
2017	Western Kentucky	6–7	4–4	T–3rd (East)	L Cure
2018	Western Kentucky	3–9	2–6	T–6th (East)	
Western Kentucky:		9–16	6–10		
Colorado Buffaloes (Pac-12 Conference) (2022)
2022	Colorado	1–6 (Note: Sanford took over after previous head coach Karl Dorrell was fired after five games.)	1–6	T–11th	
Colorado:		1–6	1–6		
Total:		10–22			
