= 2014 NFL draft =

Selection of American football players

General information
- Date: May 8–10
- Location: Radio City Music Hall in New York City
- Networks: ESPN, NFL Network

Overview
- 256 total selections in 7 rounds
- League: NFL
- First selection: Jadeveon Clowney, DE; Houston Texans
- Mr. Irrelevant: Lonnie Ballentine, S Houston Texans
- Most selections (12): New York Jets; San Francisco 49ers
- Fewest selections (5): Indianapolis Colts

The 2014 NFL draft was the 79th annual meeting of National Football League (NFL) franchises to select newly eligible football players to the league. The draft, officially the "Player Selection Meeting", was held at Radio City Music Hall in New York City on May 8 through May 10, 2014, this was also the first draft for Troy Vincent. The draft started on May 8, 2014, at 8 p.m. EDT. The draft was moved from its traditional time frame in late April due to a scheduling conflict at Radio City Music Hall.

There was early discussion and rumors leading up to the draft on the future of staying at the current location in New York City, where it had been held since 1965. Given the increased interest the draft had garnered over the past decade, there was belief that the event may have outgrown Radio City Music Hall, which had been the venue for the past eight drafts. The possibility of extending the draft to four days was also being discussed throughout the months leading up to the draft. The NFL decided in that summer that the 2015 NFL draft will take place at the Auditorium Theatre in Chicago, Illinois.

The Houston Texans opened the draft by selecting defensive end Jadeveon Clowney from the University of South Carolina. The last time a defensive player was taken with the first overall selection was in 2006, when the Texans selected Mario Williams. The Texans also closed the draft with the selection of safety Lonnie Ballentine of the University of Memphis as Mr. Irrelevant, which is the title given to the final player selected.

The 2014 draft made history when the St. Louis Rams selected Michael Sam in the seventh round. Sam, who became the first openly gay player to ever be drafted in the NFL, was selected 249th out of 256 picks in the draft. After this, Sam's jersey was the second best selling rookie jersey on the NFL's website. Sam came out publicly in the months leading up to the draft, but he never actually made the final roster of an NFL team and was out of the league the same year.

This is also the first year that Troy Vincent started to announces picks, starting with the 40th pick.

== Early entrants ==
A record 98 underclassmen announced their intention to forgo their remaining NCAA eligibility and declare themselves available to be selected in the draft. When including four players who received degrees but still had eligibility remaining, the number swells to 102. Fourteen underclassmen—plus Teddy Bridgewater who graduated with eligibility remaining—were selected in the draft's first round, including the first four and six of the first ten players selected.

== Overview ==
The following is the breakdown of the 256 players selected by position:

- 34 linebackers
- 33 wide receivers
- 33 cornerbacks
- 22 defensive ends
- 20 offensive tackles
- 20 defensive tackles
- 20 running backs
- 20 safeties
- 15 guards
- 14 quarterbacks
- 10 centers
- 10 tight ends
- 2 fullbacks
- 2 kickers
- 1 punter

== Determination of draft order ==
The draft order is based generally on each team's record from the previous season, with teams which qualified for the postseason selecting after those which failed to make the playoffs. The Houston Texans with a 2–14 record in 2013 held the first selection of each round. The Dallas Cowboys and Baltimore Ravens finished 2013 with identical 8–8 records and strength of schedule ratings, hence a coin flip was used to determine the selection order — the Cowboys won the flip and thus selected ahead of the Ravens.

== Player selections ==
*	compensatory selection
†	Pro Bowler (Note: Players are identified as a Pro Bowler if they were selected for the Pro Bowl at any time in their career.)

Positions key
Offense	Defense	Special teams
QB — Quarterback; RB — Running back; FB — Fullback; WR — Wide receiver; TE — Tight end; OL — Offensive lineman; T — Tackle; G — Guard; C — Center	DL — Defensive lineman; DT — Defensive tackle (Note: Includes nose tackle (NT)); DE — Defensive end; EDGE — Edge rusher; LB — Linebacker (Note: Includes middle linebacker (MLB/MIKE), weakside linebacker (WILL), strongside linebacker (SAM), off-ball linebacker, and outside linebacker (OLB)); DB — Defensive back; CB — Cornerback; S — Safety (Note: Includes free safety (FS) and strong safety (SS))	K — Kicker (Note: Also known as a placekicker (PK)); P — Punter; LS — Long snapper; RS — Return specialist (Note: Includes kickoff and punt returners)

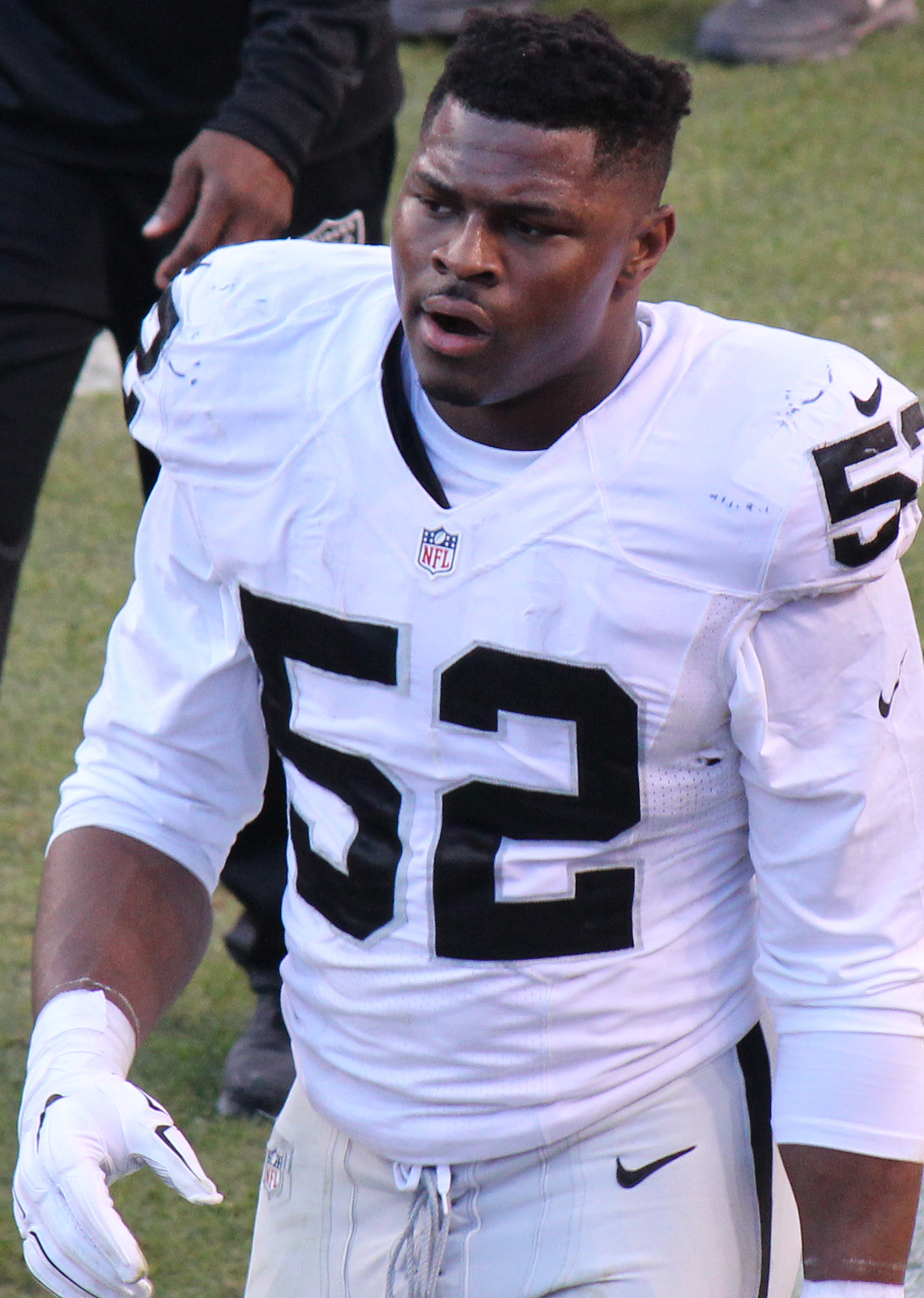
Linebacker Khalil Mack won Defensive Player of the Year in 2016

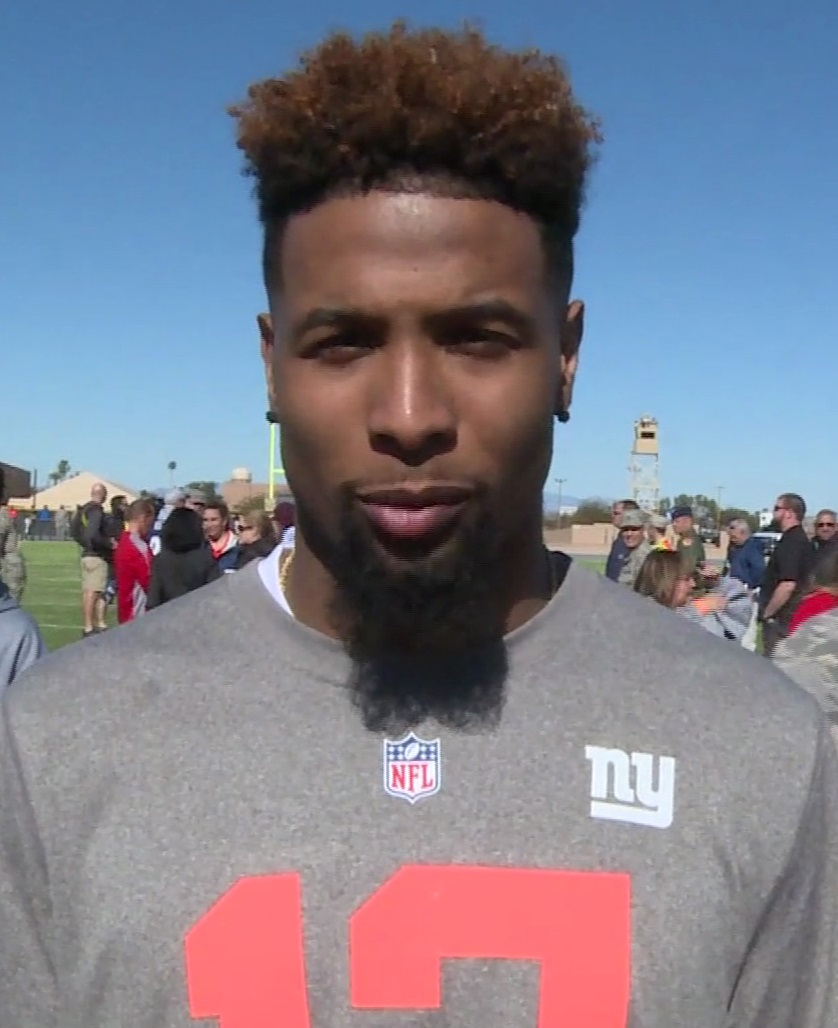
Wide receiver Odell Beckham Jr. became the quickest NFL player to obtain 4,000 career receiving yards

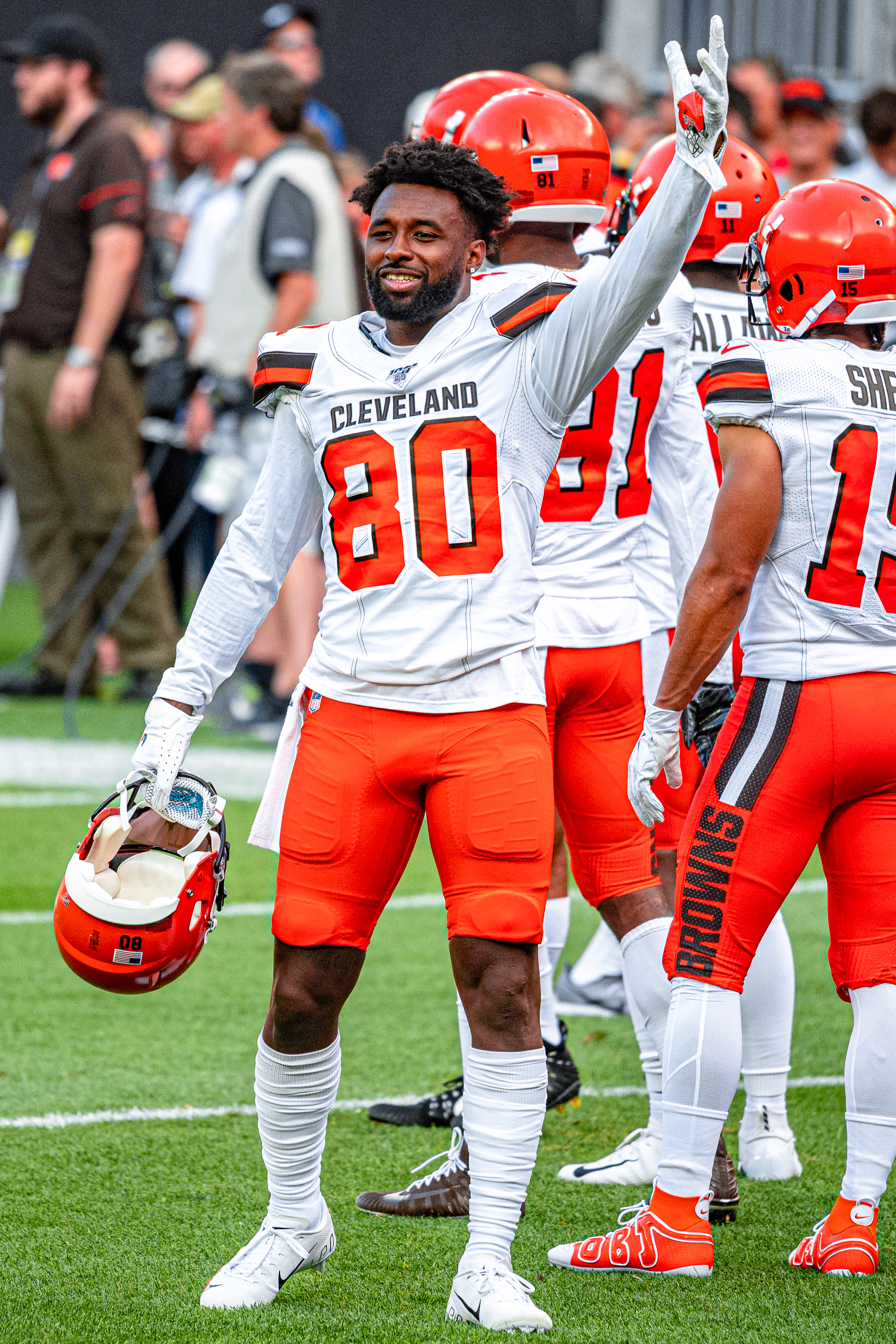
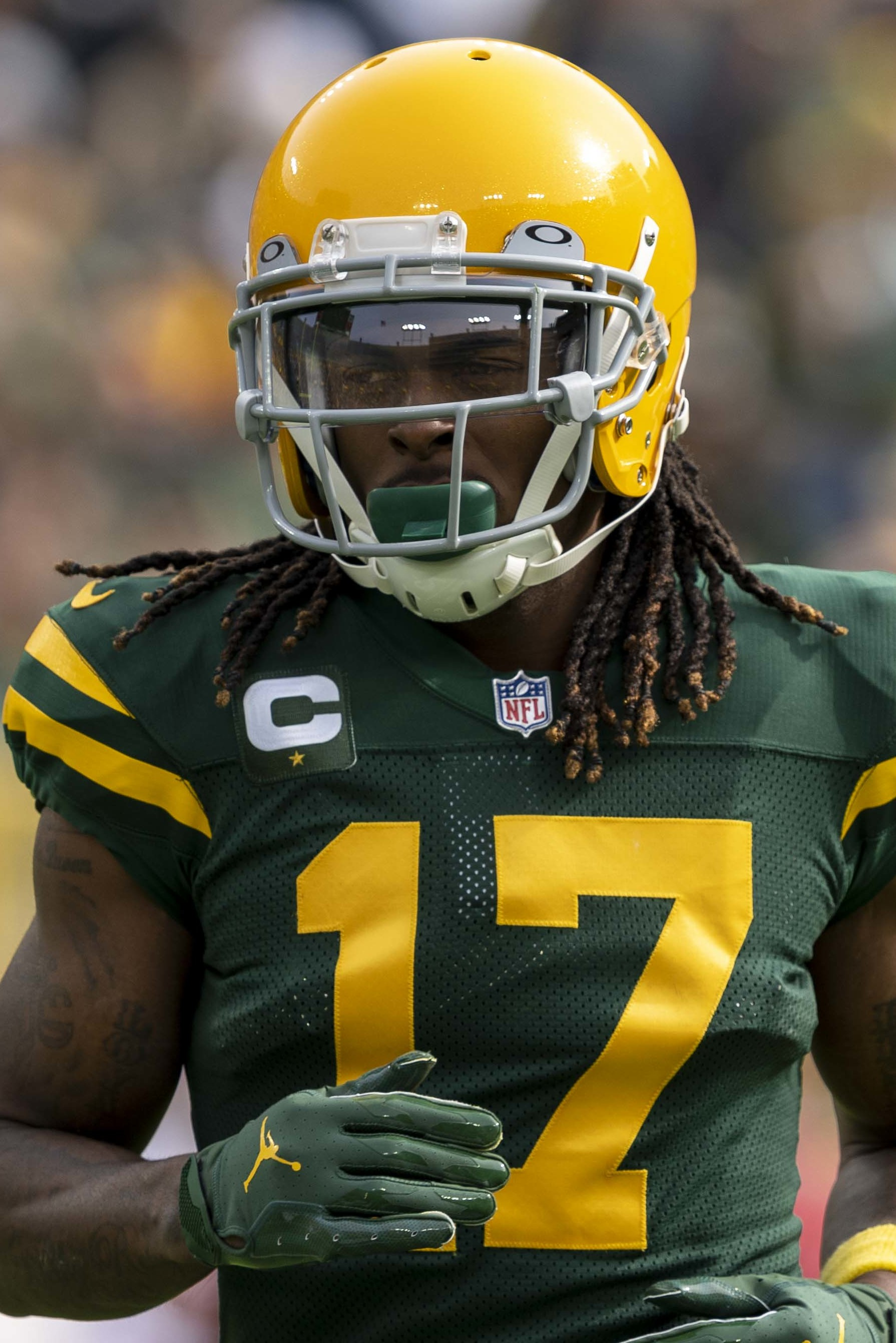
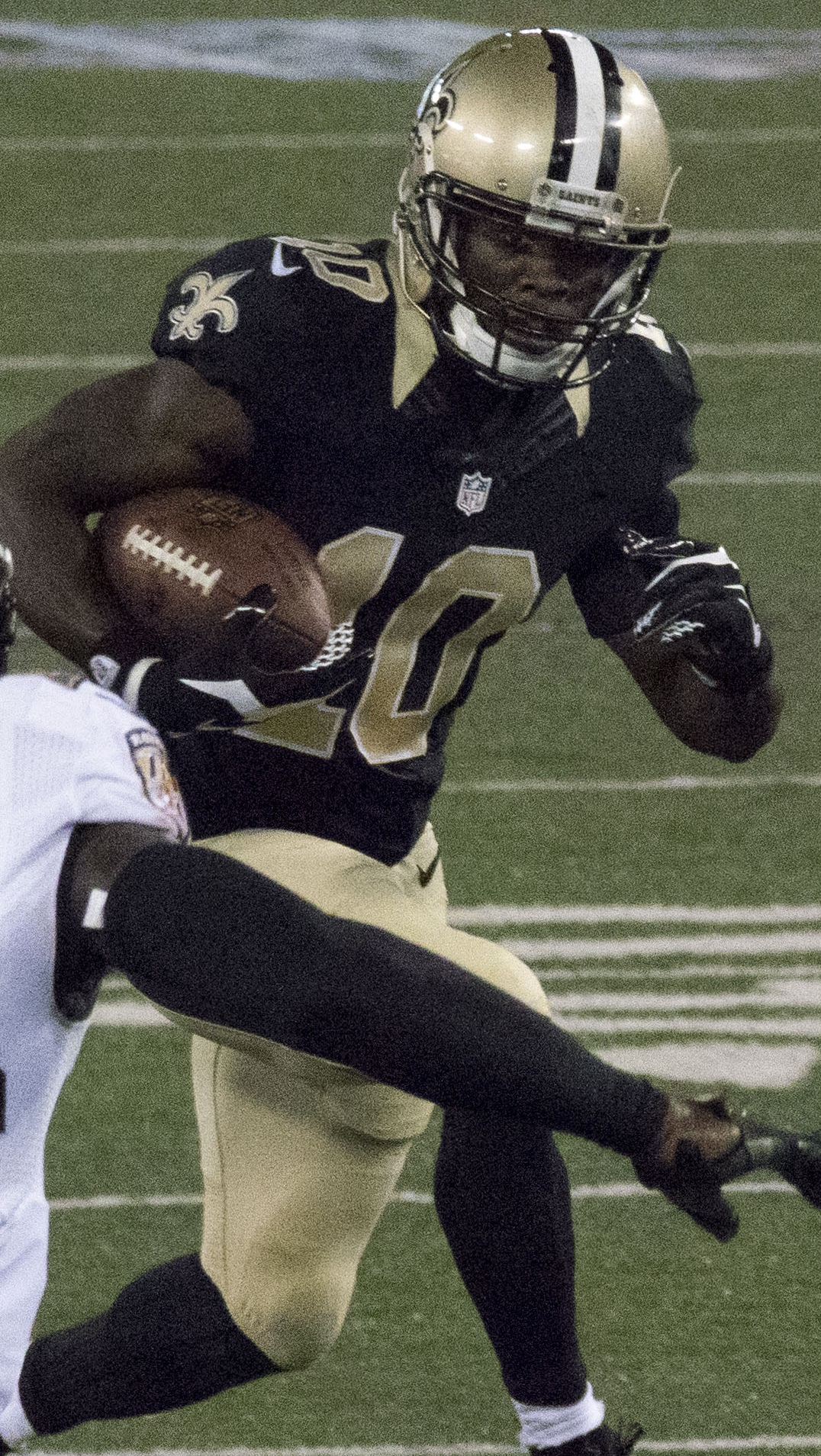
Other notable wide receivers include Mike Evans, Jarvis Landry, Davante Adams and Brandin Cooks.

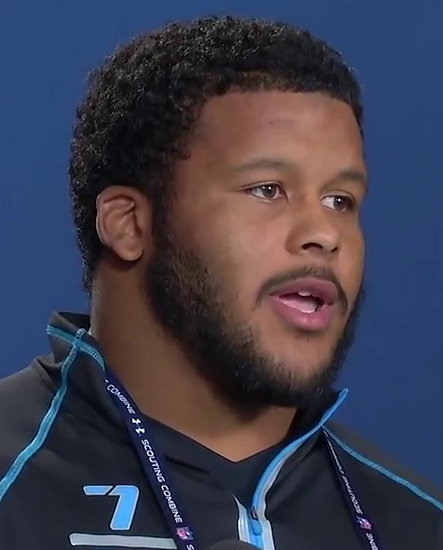
Defensive tackle Aaron Donald received a record three Defensive Player of the Year awards

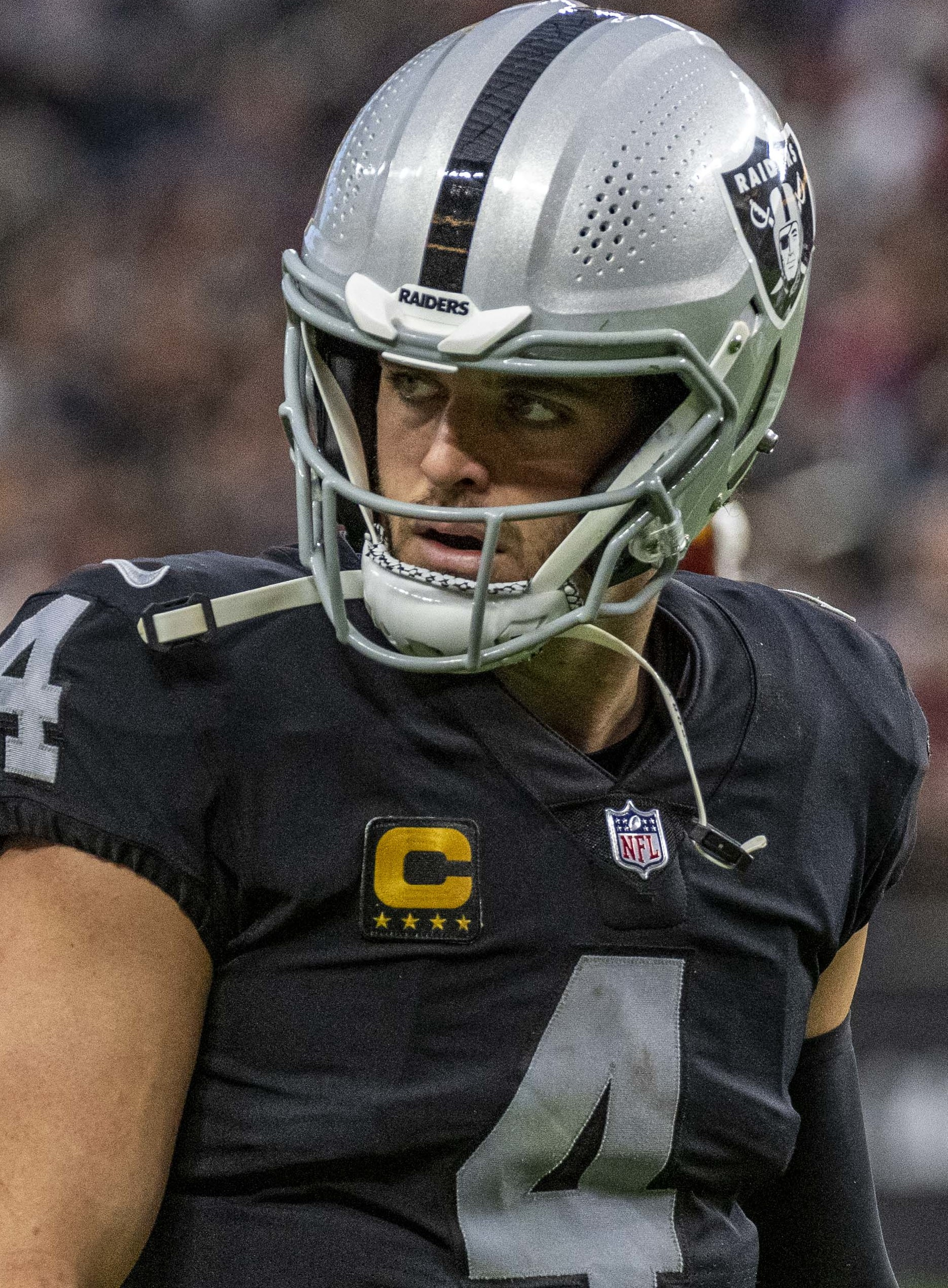
Quarterback Derek Carr ended a 12-year playoff drought for the Raiders franchise

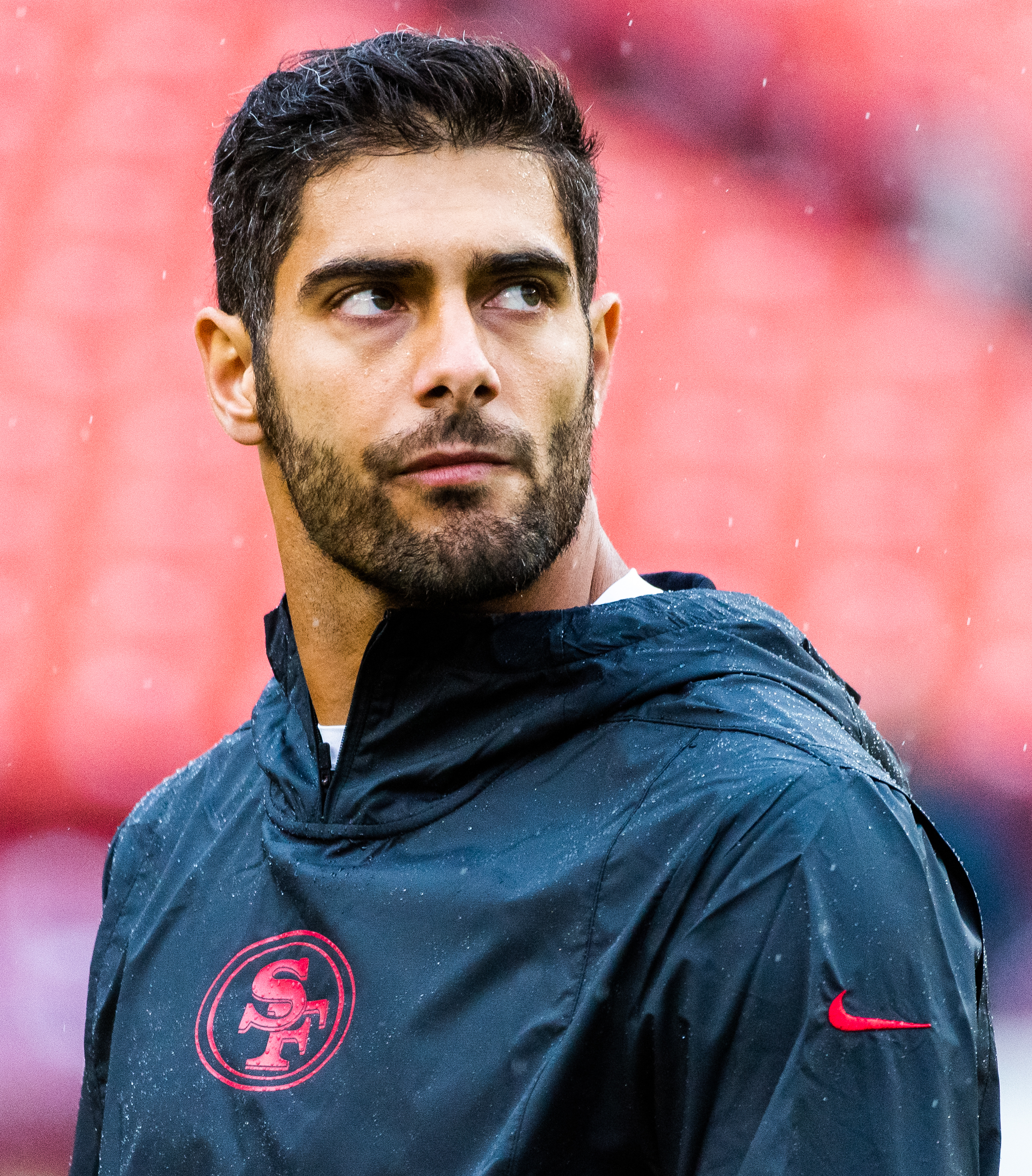
Quarterback Jimmy Garoppolo helped the San Francisco 49ers reach Super Bowl LIV

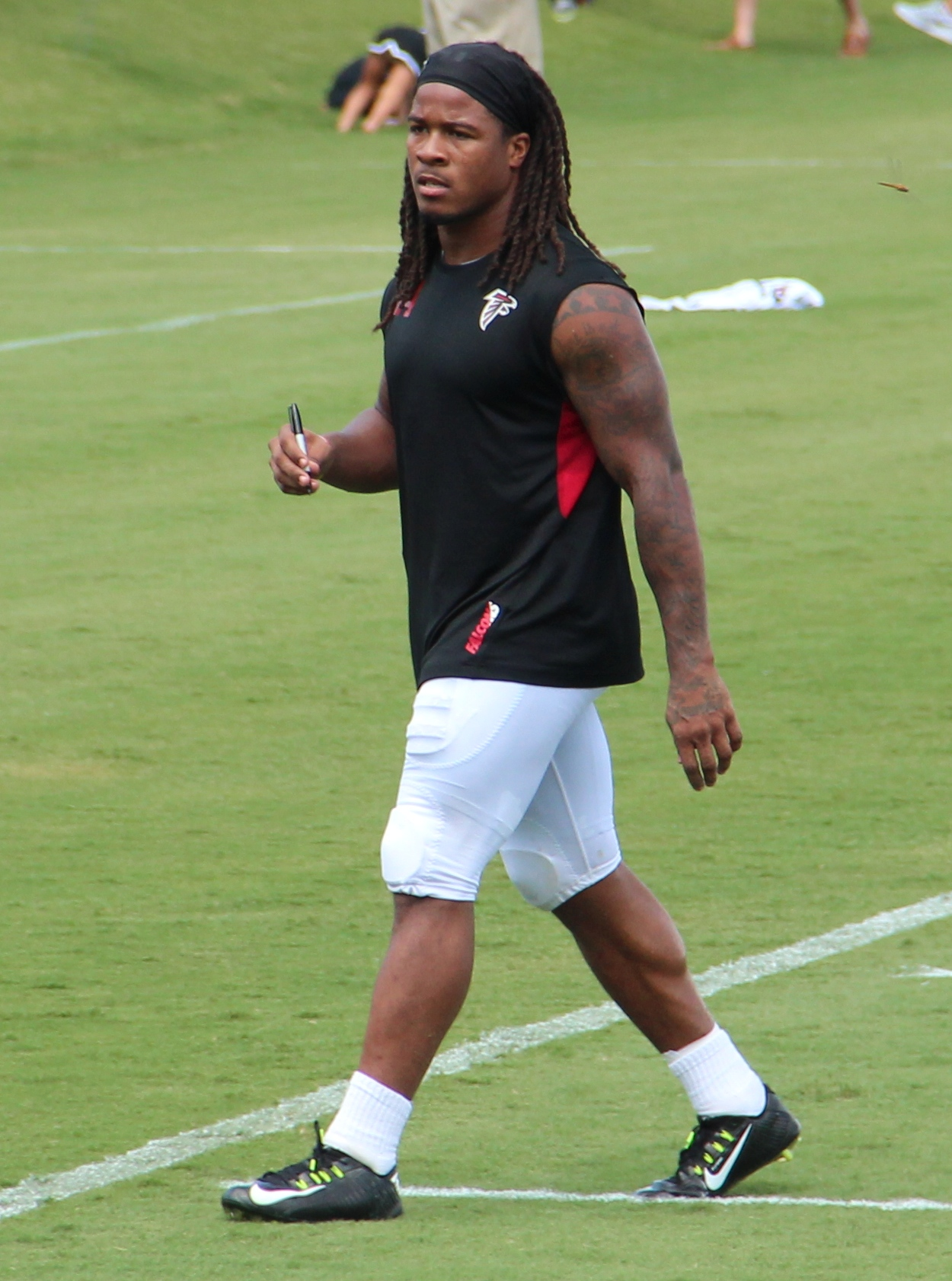
Running back Devonta Freeman led the league in rushing touchdowns during the 2015 season

Rnd.	Pick	Team	Player	Pos.	College	Notes
1	1	Houston Texans	Jadeveon Clowney ^{†}	DE	South Carolina	
1	2	St. Louis Rams	Greg Robinson	T	Auburn	from Washington (Note: No. 2: Washington → St. Louis (PD). Washington traded a first-round selection (2nd overall), 2012 first- and second-round selections, and a 2013 first-round selection to St. Louis in exchange for a 2012 first-round selection.)
1	3	Jacksonville Jaguars	Blake Bortles	QB	UCF	
1	4	Buffalo Bills	Sammy Watkins	WR	Clemson	from Cleveland (Note: No. 4: Cleveland → Buffalo (D). Cleveland traded a first-round selection (4th overall) to Buffalo in exchange for a first-round selection (9th overall), and 2015 first- and fourth-round selections.)
1	5	Oakland Raiders	Khalil Mack ^{†}	LB	Buffalo	
1	6	Atlanta Falcons	Jake Matthews ^{†}	T	Texas A&M	
1	7	Tampa Bay Buccaneers	Mike Evans ^{†}	WR	Texas A&M	
1	8	Cleveland Browns	Justin Gilbert	CB	Oklahoma State	from Minnesota (Note: No. 8: Minnesota → Cleveland (D). Minnesota traded a first-round selection (8th overall) to Cleveland in exchange for first- and fifth-round selections (9th and 145th overall).)
1	9	Minnesota Vikings	Anthony Barr ^{†}	LB	UCLA	from Buffalo via Cleveland (Note: No. 9: Buffalo → Cleveland → Minnesota. Multiple trades: Buffalo → Cleveland (D). See Round 1: No. 4: Cleveland → Buffalo. Cleveland → Minnesota (D). See Round 1: No. 8: Minnesota → Cleveland.)
1	10	Detroit Lions	Eric Ebron ^{†}	TE	North Carolina	
1	11	Tennessee Titans	Taylor Lewan ^{†}	T	Michigan	
1	12	New York Giants	Odell Beckham Jr. ^{†}	WR	LSU	
1	13	St. Louis Rams	Aaron Donald ^{†}	DT	Pittsburgh	
1	14	Chicago Bears	Kyle Fuller ^{†}	CB	Virginia Tech	
1	15	Pittsburgh Steelers	Ryan Shazier ^{†}	LB	Ohio State	
1	16	Dallas Cowboys	Zack Martin ^{†}	G	Notre Dame	
1	17	Baltimore Ravens	C. J. Mosley ^{†}	LB	Alabama	
1	18	New York Jets	Calvin Pryor	S	Louisville	
1	19	Miami Dolphins	Ja'Wuan James	T	Tennessee	
1	20	New Orleans Saints	Brandin Cooks	WR	Oregon State	from Arizona (Note: No. 20: Arizona → New Orleans (D). Arizona traded a first-round selection (20th overall) to New Orleans in exchange for first- and third-round selections (27th and 91st overall).)
1	21	Green Bay Packers	Ha Ha Clinton-Dix ^{†}	S	Alabama	
1	22	Cleveland Browns	Johnny Manziel	QB	Texas A&M	from Philadelphia; (Note: No. 22: Philadelphia → Cleveland (D). Philadelphia traded a first-round selection (22nd overall) to Cleveland in exchange for first- and third-round selections (26th and 83rd overall).); 2012 Heisman Trophy winner (Note: Manziel was the 2012 winner of the Heisman Trophy which is awarded annually to the player deemed the most outstanding player in collegiate football.)
1	23	Kansas City Chiefs	Dee Ford ^{†}	DE	Auburn	
1	24	Cincinnati Bengals	Darqueze Dennard	CB	Michigan State	
1	25	San Diego Chargers	Jason Verrett ^{†}	CB	TCU	
1	26	Philadelphia Eagles	Marcus Smith	LB	Louisville	from Indianapolis via Cleveland (Note: No. 26: Indianapolis → Cleveland → Philadelphia. Multiple trades: Indianapolis → Cleveland (PD). Indianapolis traded a first-round selection (26th overall) to Cleveland in exchange for RB Trent Richardson. Cleveland → Philadelphia (D). See Round 1: No. 22: Philadelphia → Cleveland.)
1	27	Arizona Cardinals	Deone Bucannon	S	Washington State	from New Orleans (Note: No. 27: New Orleans → Arizona (D). See Round 1: No. 20: Arizona → New Orleans.)
1	28	Carolina Panthers	Kelvin Benjamin	WR	Florida State	
1	29	New England Patriots	Dominique Easley	DT	Florida	
1	30	San Francisco 49ers	Jimmie Ward	S	Northern Illinois	
1	31	Denver Broncos	Bradley Roby	CB	Ohio State	
1	32	Minnesota Vikings	Teddy Bridgewater ^{†}	QB	Louisville	from Seattle (Note: No. 32: Seattle → Minnesota (D). Seattle traded a first-round selection (32nd overall) to Minnesota in exchange for second- and fourth-round selections (40th and 108th overall).)
2	33	Houston Texans	Xavier Su'a-Filo	G	UCLA	
2	34	Dallas Cowboys	DeMarcus Lawrence ^{†}	DE	Boise State	from Washington (Note: No. 34: Washington → Dallas (D). Washington traded a second-round selection (34th overall) to Dallas in exchange for second- and third-round selections (47th and 78th overall).)
2	35	Cleveland Browns	Joel Bitonio ^{†}	T	Nevada	
2	36	Oakland Raiders	Derek Carr ^{†}	QB	Fresno State	
2	37	Atlanta Falcons	Ra'Shede Hageman	DT	Minnesota	
2	38	Tampa Bay Buccaneers	Austin Seferian-Jenkins	TE	Washington	
2	39	Jacksonville Jaguars	Marqise Lee	WR	USC	
2	40	Detroit Lions	Kyle Van Noy ^{†}	LB	BYU	from Minnesota via Seattle (Note: No. 40: Minnesota → Seattle → Detroit. Multiple trades: Minnesota → Seattle (D). See Round 1: No. 32: Seattle → Minnesota. Seattle → Detroit (D). Seattle traded second- and fifth-round selections (40th and 146th overall) to Detroit in exchange for second-, fourth- and seventh- round selections (45th, 111th and 227th overall).)
2	41	St. Louis Rams	Lamarcus Joyner	S	Florida State	from Buffalo (Note: No. 41: Buffalo → St. Louis (D). Buffalo traded a second-round selection (41st overall) to St. Louis in exchange for second- and fifth-round selections (44th and 153rd overall).)
2	42	Philadelphia Eagles	Jordan Matthews	WR	Vanderbilt	from Tennessee (Note: No. 42: Tennessee → Philadelphia (D). Tennessee traded a second-round selection (42nd overall) to Philadelphia in exchange for second- and fourth-round selections (54th and 122nd overall).)
2	43	New York Giants	Weston Richburg	C	Colorado State	
2	44	Buffalo Bills	Cyrus Kouandjio	T	Alabama	from St. Louis (Note: No. 44: St. Louis → Buffalo (D). See Round 2: No. 41: Buffalo → St. Louis.)
2	45	Seattle Seahawks	Paul Richardson	WR	Colorado	from Detroit (Note: No. 45: Detroit → Seattle (D). See Round 2: No. 40: Seattle → Detroit.)
2	46	Pittsburgh Steelers	Stephon Tuitt	DE	Notre Dame	
2	47	Washington Redskins	Trent Murphy	LB	Stanford	from Dallas (Note: No. 47: Dallas → Washington (D). See Round 2: No. 34: Washington → Dallas.)
2	48	Baltimore Ravens	Timmy Jernigan	DT	Florida State	
2	49	New York Jets	Jace Amaro	TE	Texas Tech	
2	50	San Diego Chargers	Jeremiah Attaochu	LB	Georgia Tech	from Miami (Note: No. 50: Miami → San Diego (D). Miami traded a second-round selection (50th overall) to San Diego in exchange for second- and fourth-round selections (57th and 125th overall).)
2	51	Chicago Bears	Ego Ferguson	DT	LSU	
2	52	Arizona Cardinals	Troy Niklas	TE	Notre Dame	
2	53	Green Bay Packers	Davante Adams ^{†}	WR	Fresno State	
2	54	Tennessee Titans	Bishop Sankey	RB	Washington	from Philadelphia (Note: No. 54: Philadelphia → Tennessee (D). See Round 2: No. 42: Tennessee → Philadelphia.)
2	55	Cincinnati Bengals	Jeremy Hill	RB	LSU	
2	56	Denver Broncos	Cody Latimer	WR	Indiana	from Kansas City via San Francisco (Note: No. 56: Kansas City → San Francisco → Denver. Multiple trades: Kansas City → San Francisco (PD). Kansas City traded a conditional second-round selection (56th overall) and a 2013 second-round selection to San Francisco in exchange for QB Alex Smith. The second-round selection was upgraded from the third round after Kansas City won a minimum of eight games during the 2013 season. San Francisco → Denver (D). San Francisco traded second- and seventh-round selections (56th and 242nd overall) to Denver in exchange for second- and fifth-round selections (63rd and 171st overall), and a 2015 fourth-round selection.)
2	57	San Francisco 49ers	Carlos Hyde	RB	Ohio State	from San Diego via Miami (Note: No. 57: San Diego → Miami → San Francisco. Multiple trades: San Diego → Miami (D). See Round 2: No. 50: Miami → San Diego. Miami → San Francisco (D). Miami traded a second-round selection (57th overall) to San Francisco in exchange for second- and fifth-round selections (63rd and 171st overall).)
2	58	New Orleans Saints	Stanley Jean-Baptiste	CB	Nebraska	
2	59	Indianapolis Colts	Jack Mewhort	T	Ohio State	
2	60	Carolina Panthers	Kony Ealy	DE	Missouri	
2	61	Jacksonville Jaguars	Allen Robinson ^{†}	WR	Penn State	from San Francisco (Note: No. 61: San Francisco → Jacksonville (D). San Francisco traded a second-round selection (61st overall) to Jacksonville in exchange for third- and fifth-round selections (70th and 150th overall).)
2	62	New England Patriots	Jimmy Garoppolo	QB	Eastern Illinois	
2	63	Miami Dolphins	Jarvis Landry ^{†}	WR	LSU	from Denver via San Francisco (Note: No. 63: Denver → San Francisco → Miami. Multiple trades: Denver → San Francisco (D). See Round 2: No. 56: San Francisco → Denver. San Francisco → Miami (D). See Round 2: No. 57: Miami → San Francisco.)
2	64	Seattle Seahawks	Justin Britt	T	Missouri	
3	65	Houston Texans	C. J. Fiedorowicz	TE	Iowa	
3	66	Washington Redskins	Morgan Moses	T	Virginia	
3	67	Miami Dolphins	Billy Turner	T	North Dakota State	from Oakland (Note: No. 67: Oakland → Miami (D). Oakland traded a third-round selection (67th overall) to Miami in exchange for third- and fourth-round selections (81st and 116th overall).)
3	68	Atlanta Falcons	Dezmen Southward	S	Wisconsin	
3	69	Tampa Bay Buccaneers	Charles Sims	RB	West Virginia	
3	70	San Francisco 49ers	Marcus Martin	C	USC	from Jacksonville (Note: No. 70: Jacksonville → San Francisco (D). See Round 2: No. 61: San Francisco → Jacksonville.)
3	71	Cleveland Browns	Christian Kirksey	LB	Iowa	
3	72	Minnesota Vikings	Scott Crichton	DE	Oregon State	
3	73	Buffalo Bills	Preston Brown	LB	Louisville	
3	74	New York Giants	Jay Bromley	DT	Syracuse	
3	75	St. Louis Rams	Tre Mason	RB	Auburn	
3	76	Detroit Lions	Travis Swanson	C	Arkansas	
3	77	San Francisco 49ers	Chris Borland	LB	Wisconsin	from Tennessee (Note: No. 77: Tennessee → San Francisco (PD). Tennessee traded a third-round selection (77th overall), and 2013 second- and seventh-round selections to San Francisco in exchange for a 2013 second-round selection.)
3	78	Washington Redskins	Spencer Long	G	Nebraska	from Dallas (Note: No. 78: Dallas → Washington (D). See Round 2: No. 34: Washington → Dallas.)
3	79	Baltimore Ravens	Terrence Brooks	S	Florida State	
3	80	New York Jets	Dexter McDougle	CB	Maryland	
3	81	Oakland Raiders	Gabe Jackson	G	Mississippi State	from Miami (Note: No. 81: Miami → Oakland (D). See Round 3: No. 67: Oakland → Miami.)
3	82	Chicago Bears	Will Sutton	DT	Arizona State	
3	83	Houston Texans	Louis Nix	DT	Notre Dame	from Pittsburgh via Cleveland and Philadelphia (Note: No. 83: Pittsburgh → Cleveland → Philadelphia → Houston. Multiple trades: Pittsburgh → Cleveland (PD). Pittsburgh traded a third-round selection (83rd overall) to Cleveland in exchange for a 2013 fourth-round selection. Cleveland → Philadelphia (D). See Round 1: No. 22: Philadelphia → Cleveland. Philadelphia → Houston (D). Philadelphia traded a third-round selection (83rd overall) to Houston in exchange for fourth- and fifth-round selections (101st and 141st overall).)
3	84	Arizona Cardinals	Kareem Martin	DE	North Carolina	
3	85	Green Bay Packers	Khyri Thornton	DT	Southern Miss	
3	86	Philadelphia Eagles	Josh Huff	WR	Oregon	
3	87	Kansas City Chiefs	Phillip Gaines	CB	Rice	
3	88	Cincinnati Bengals	Will Clarke	DE	West Virginia	
3	89	San Diego Chargers	Chris Watt	G	Notre Dame	
3	90	Indianapolis Colts	Donte Moncrief	WR	Ole Miss	
3	91	Arizona Cardinals	John Brown	WR	Pittsburg State	from New Orleans (Note: No. 91: New Orleans → Arizona (D). See Round 1: No. 20: Arizona → New Orleans.)
3	92	Carolina Panthers	Trai Turner ^{†}	G	LSU	
3	93	Jacksonville Jaguars	Brandon Linder	G	Miami (FL)	from New England (Note: No. 93: New England → Jacksonville (D). New England traded a third-round selection (93rd overall) to Jacksonville in exchange for fourth- and sixth-round selections (105th and 179th overall).)
3	94	Cleveland Browns	Terrance West	RB	Towson	from San Francisco (Note: No. 94: San Francisco → Cleveland (D). San Francisco traded a third-round selection (94th overall) to Cleveland in exchange for fourth- and sixth-round selections (106th and 180th overall).)
3	95	Denver Broncos	Michael Schofield	T	Michigan	
3	96	Minnesota Vikings	Jerick McKinnon	RB	Georgia Southern	from Seattle (Note: No. 96: Seattle → Minnesota (PD). Seattle traded a third-round selection, and 2013 first- and seventh-round selections to Minnesota in exchange for WR Percy Harvin.)
3*	97	Pittsburgh Steelers	Dri Archer	RB	Kent State	
3*	98	Green Bay Packers	Richard Rodgers	TE	California	
3*	99	Baltimore Ravens	Crockett Gillmore	TE	Colorado State	
3*	100	San Francisco 49ers	Brandon Thomas	G	Clemson	
4	101	Philadelphia Eagles	Jaylen Watkins	CB	Florida	from Houston (Note: No. 101: Houston → Philadelphia (D). See Round 3: No. 83: Philadelphia → Houston.)
4	102	Washington Redskins	Bashaud Breeland	CB	Clemson	
4	103	Atlanta Falcons	Devonta Freeman ^{†}	RB	Florida State	
4	104	New York Jets	Jalen Saunders	WR	Oklahoma	from Tampa Bay (Note: No. 104: Tampa Bay → NY Jets (PD). Tampa Bay traded a conditional fourth-round selection (104th overall) and a 2013 first-round selection to the NY Jets in exchange for CB Darrelle Revis. The pick was downgraded from the third round to the fourth round when Tampa Bay released Revis prior to the start of the 2014 league year in March.)
4	105	New England Patriots	Bryan Stork	C	Florida State	from Jacksonville (Note: No. 105: Jacksonville → New England (D). See Round 3: No. 93: New England → Jacksonville.)
4	106	San Francisco 49ers	Bruce Ellington	WR	South Carolina	from Cleveland (Note: No. 106: Cleveland → San Francisco (D). See Round 3: No. 94: San Francisco → Cleveland.)
4	107	Oakland Raiders	Justin Ellis	DT	Louisiana Tech	
4	108	Seattle Seahawks	Cassius Marsh	DE	UCLA	from Minnesota (Note: No. 108: Minnesota → Seattle (D). See Round 1: No. 32: Seattle → Minnesota.)
4	109	Buffalo Bills	Ross Cockrell	CB	Duke	
4	110	St. Louis Rams	Maurice Alexander	S	Utah State	
4	111	Cincinnati Bengals	Russell Bodine	C	North Carolina	from Detroit via Seattle (Note: No. 111: Detroit → Seattle → Cincinnati. Multiple trades: Detroit → Seattle (D). See Round 2: No. 40: Seattle → Detroit. Seattle → Cincinnati (D). Seattle traded a fourth-round selection (111th overall) to Cincinnati in exchange for fourth- and sixth-round selections (123rd and 199th overall).)
4	112	Tennessee Titans	DaQuan Jones	DT	Penn State	
4	113	New York Giants	Andre Williams	RB	Boston College	
4	114	Jacksonville Jaguars	Aaron Colvin	CB	Oklahoma	from Baltimore (Note: No. 114: Baltimore → Jacksonville (PD). Baltimore traded fourth- and fifth-round selections (114th and 159th overall) to Jacksonville in exchange for OT Eugene Monroe.)
4	115	New York Jets	Shaq Evans	WR	UCLA	
4	116	Oakland Raiders	Keith McGill	CB	Utah	from Miami (Note: No. 116: Miami → Oakland (D). See Round 3: No. 67: Oakland → Miami.)
4	117	Chicago Bears	Ka'Deem Carey	RB	Arizona	
4	118	Pittsburgh Steelers	Martavis Bryant	WR	Clemson	
4	119	Dallas Cowboys	Anthony Hitchens	LB	Iowa	
4	120	Arizona Cardinals	Logan Thomas	QB	Virginia Tech	
4	121	Green Bay Packers	Carl Bradford	LB	Arizona State	
4	122	Tennessee Titans	Marqueston Huff	S	Wyoming	from Philadelphia (Note: No. 122: Philadelphia → Tennessee (D). See Round 2: No. 42: Tennessee → Philadelphia.)
4	123	Seattle Seahawks	Kevin Norwood	WR	Alabama	from Cincinnati (Note: No. 123: Cincinnati → Seattle (D). See Round 4: No. 111: Seattle → Cincinnati.)
4	124	Kansas City Chiefs	De'Anthony Thomas	RB	Oregon	
4	125	Miami Dolphins	Walt Aikens	CB	Liberty	from San Diego (Note: No. 125: San Diego → Miami (D). See Round 2: No. 50: Miami → San Diego.)
4	126	New Orleans Saints	Khairi Fortt	LB	California	
4	127	Cleveland Browns	Pierre Desir	CB	Lindenwood	from Indianapolis (Note: No. 127: Indianapolis → Cleveland (PD). Indianapolis traded a fourth-round selection (127th overall) to Cleveland in exchange for a 2013 fifth-round selection.)
4	128	Carolina Panthers	Tre Boston	S	North Carolina	
4	129	San Francisco 49ers	Dontae Johnson	CB	NC State	
4	130	New England Patriots	James White	RB	Wisconsin	
4	131	Chicago Bears	Brock Vereen	S	Minnesota	from Denver (Note: No. 131: Denver → Chicago (D). Denver traded fourth- and seventh-round selections (131st and 246th overall) to Chicago in exchange for a fifth-round selection (156th overall) and a 2015 fifth-round selection.)
4	132	Seattle Seahawks	Kevin Pierre-Louis	LB	Boston College	
4*	133	Detroit Lions	Nevin Lawson	CB	Utah State	
4*	134	Baltimore Ravens	Brent Urban	DT	Virginia	
4*	135	Houston Texans	Tom Savage	QB	Pittsburgh	
4*	136	Detroit Lions	Larry Webster III	DE	Bloomsburg	
4*	137	New York Jets	Dakota Dozier	G	Furman	
4*	138	Baltimore Ravens	Lorenzo Taliaferro	RB	Coastal Carolina	
4*	139	Atlanta Falcons	Prince Shembo	LB	Notre Dame	
4*	140	New England Patriots	Cameron Fleming	T	Stanford	
5	141	Philadelphia Eagles	Taylor Hart	DE	Oregon	from Houston (Note: No. 141: Houston → Philadelphia (D). See Round 3: No. 83: Philadelphia → Houston.)
5	142	Washington Redskins	Ryan Grant	WR	Tulane	
5	143	Tampa Bay Buccaneers	Kadeem Edwards	G	Tennessee State	
5	144	Jacksonville Jaguars	Telvin Smith ^{†}	LB	Florida State	
5	145	Minnesota Vikings	David Yankey	G	Stanford	from Cleveland (Note: No. 145: Cleveland → Minnesota (D). See Round 1: No. 8: Minnesota → Cleveland.)
5	146	Dallas Cowboys	Devin Street	WR	Pittsburgh	from Oakland via Seattle and Detroit (Note: No. 146: Oakland → Seattle → Detroit → Dallas. Multiple trades: Oakland → Seattle (PD). Oakland traded a fifth-round selection (146th overall) to Seattle in exchange for QB Matt Flynn. The trade also conditionally included the Raiders' 2015 fifth-round selection, but that condition was voided when the Raiders waived Flynn in October 2013. Seattle → Detroit (D). See Round 2: No. 40: Seattle → Detroit. Detroit → Dallas (D). Detroit traded a fifth-round selection (146th overall) to Dallas in exchange for fifth- and seventh-round selections (158th and 229th overall).)
5	147	Atlanta Falcons	Ricardo Allen	CB	Purdue	
5	148	Carolina Panthers	Bené Benwikere	CB	San Jose State	from Minnesota (Note: No. 148: Minnesota → Carolina (D). Minnesota traded a fifth-round selection (148th overall) to Carolina in exchange for fifth- and seventh-round selections (168th and 225th overall).)
5	149	Tampa Bay Buccaneers	Kevin Pamphile	T	Purdue	from Buffalo (Note: No. 149: Buffalo → Tampa Bay (D). Buffalo traded a fifth-round selection (149th overall) to Tampa Bay in exchange for a seventh-round selection (221st overall) and a 2015 fifth-round selection.)
5	150	San Francisco 49ers	Aaron Lynch	DE	South Florida	from Detroit via Jacksonville (Note: No. 150: Detroit → Jacksonville → San Francisco. Multiple trades: Detroit → Jacksonville (PD). Detroit traded a fifth-round selection (150th overall) to Jacksonville in exchange for WR Mike Thomas. Jacksonville → San Francisco (D). See Round 2: No. 61: San Francisco → Jacksonville.)
5	151	Tennessee Titans	Avery Williamson	LB	Kentucky	
5	152	New York Giants	Nat Berhe	S	San Diego State	
5	153	Buffalo Bills	Cyril Richardson	G	Baylor	from St. Louis (Note: No. 153: St. Louis → Buffalo (D). See Round 2: No. 41: Buffalo → St. Louis.)
5	154	New York Jets	Jeremiah George	LB	Iowa State	
5	155	Miami Dolphins	Arthur Lynch	TE	Georgia	
5	156	Denver Broncos	Lamin Barrow	LB	LSU	from Chicago (Note: No. 156: Chicago → Denver (D). See Round 4: No. 131: Denver → Chicago.)
5	157	Pittsburgh Steelers	Shaquille Richardson	CB	Arizona	
5	158	Detroit Lions	Caraun Reid	DT	Princeton	from Dallas (Note: No. 158: Dallas → Detroit (D). See Round 5: No. 146: Detroit → Dallas.)
5	159	Jacksonville Jaguars	Chris Smith	DE	Arkansas	from Baltimore (Note: No. 159: Baltimore → Jacksonville (PD). See Round 4: No. 114: Baltimore → Jacksonville.)
5	160	Arizona Cardinals	Ed Stinson	DE	Alabama	
5	161	Green Bay Packers	Corey Linsley ^{†}	C	Ohio State	
5	162	Philadelphia Eagles	Ed Reynolds	S	Stanford	
5	163	Kansas City Chiefs	Aaron Murray	QB	Georgia	
5	164	Cincinnati Bengals	A. J. McCarron	QB	Alabama	
5	165	San Diego Chargers	Ryan Carrethers	DT	Arkansas State	
5	166	Indianapolis Colts	Jonathan Newsome	DE	Ball State	
5	167	New Orleans Saints	Vinnie Sunseri	S	Alabama	
5	168	Atlanta Falcons	Marquis Spruill	LB	Syracuse	from Carolina via Minnesota (Note: No. 168: Carolina → Minnesota → Atlanta. Multiple trades: Carolina → Minnesota (D). See Round 5: No. 148: Minnesota → Carolina. Minnesota → Atlanta (D). Minnesota traded a fifth-round selection (168th overall) to Atlanta in exchange for sixth- and seventh-round selections (182nd and 220th overall).)
5	169	New Orleans Saints	Ronald Powell	OLB	Florida	from New England via Philadelphia (Note: No. 169: New England → Philadelphia → New Orleans. Multiple trades: New England → Philadelphia (PD). New England traded a fifth-round selection (169th overall) to Philadelphia in exchange for a sixth-round selection (198th overall) and DT Isaac Sopoaga. Philadelphia → New Orleans (PD). Philadelphia traded a fifth-round selection (169th overall) to New Orleans in exchange for RB Darren Sproles.)
5	170	San Francisco 49ers	Keith Reaser	CB	Florida Atlantic	
5	171	Miami Dolphins	Jordan Tripp	LB	Montana	from Denver via San Francisco (Note: No. 171: Denver → San Francisco → Miami. Multiple trades: Denver → San Francisco (D). See Round 2: No. 56: San Francisco → Denver. San Francisco → Miami (D). See Round 2: No. 57: Miami → San Francisco.)
5	172	Seattle Seahawks	Jimmy Staten	DT	Middle Tennessee	
5*	173	Pittsburgh Steelers	Wesley Johnson	C	Vanderbilt	
5*	174	New York Giants	Devon Kennard	OLB	USC	
5*	175	Baltimore Ravens	John Urschel	G	Penn State	
5*	176	Green Bay Packers	Jared Abbrederis	WR	Wisconsin	
6	177	Houston Texans	Jeoffrey Pagan	DE	Alabama	
6	178	Tennessee Titans	Zach Mettenberger	QB	LSU	from Washington (Note: No. 178: Washington → Tennessee (D). Washington traded a sixth-round selection (178th overall) to Tennessee in exchange for sixth- and seventh-round selections (186th and 228th overall).)
6	179	New England Patriots	Jon Halapio	G	Florida	from Jacksonville (Note: No. 179: Jacksonville → New England (D). See Round 3: No. 93: New England → Jacksonville.)
6	180	San Francisco 49ers	Kenneth Acker	CB	SMU	from Cleveland (Note: No. 180: Cleveland → San Francisco (D). See Round 3: No. 94: San Francisco → Cleveland.)
6	181	Houston Texans	Alfred Blue	RB	LSU	from Oakland (Note: No. 181: Oakland → Houston (PD). Oakland traded a sixth-round selection (181st overall) to Houston in exchange for QB Matt Schaub.)
6	182	Minnesota Vikings	Antone Exum	CB	Virginia Tech	from Atlanta (Note: No. 182: Atlanta → Minnesota (D). See Round 5: No. 168: Minnesota → Atlanta.)
6	183	Chicago Bears	David Fales	QB	San Jose State	from Tampa Bay (Note: No. 183: Tampa Bay → Chicago (PD). Tampa Bay traded a sixth-round selection (183rd overall) to Chicago in exchange for OT Gabe Carimi.)
6	184	Minnesota Vikings	Kendall James	CB	Maine	
6	185	Tampa Bay Buccaneers	Robert Herron	WR	Wyoming	from Buffalo (Note: No. 185: Buffalo → Tampa Bay (PD). Buffalo traded a sixth-round selection (185th overall) to Tampa Bay in exchange for WR Mike Williams.)
6	186	Washington Redskins	Lache Seastrunk	RB	Baylor	from Tennessee (Note: No. 186: Tennessee → Washington (D). See Round 6: No. 178: Washington → Tennessee.)
6	187	New York Giants	Bennett Jackson	CB	Notre Dame	
6	188	St. Louis Rams	E. J. Gaines	CB	Missouri	
6	189	Detroit Lions	T. J. Jones	WR	Notre Dame	
6	190	Miami Dolphins	Matt Hazel	WR	Coastal Carolina	
6	191	Chicago Bears	Pat O'Donnell	P	Miami (FL)	
6	192	Pittsburgh Steelers	Jordan Zumwalt	OLB	UCLA	
6	193	Kansas City Chiefs	Zach Fulton	G	Tennessee	from Dallas (Note: No. 193: Dallas → Kansas City (PD). Dallas traded a sixth-round selection (193rd overall) to Kansas City in exchange for a seventh-round selection (238th overall) and LB Edgar Jones.)
6	194	Baltimore Ravens	Keith Wenning	QB	Ball State	
6	195	New York Jets	Brandon Dixon	CB	Northwest Missouri State	
6	196	Arizona Cardinals	Walt Powell	WR	Murray State	
6	197	Green Bay Packers	Demetri Goodson	CB	Baylor	
6	198	New England Patriots	Zach Moore	DE	Concordia–St. Paul	from Philadelphia (Note: No. 198: Philadelphia → New England (PD). See Round 5: No. 169: New England → Philadelphia.)
6	199	Seattle Seahawks	Garrett Scott	T	Marshall	from Cincinnati (Note: No. 199: Cincinnati → Seattle (D). See Round 4: No. 111: Seattle → Cincinnati.)
6	200	Kansas City Chiefs	Laurent Duvernay-Tardif	T	McGill	
6	201	San Diego Chargers	Marion Grice	RB	Arizona State	
6	202	New Orleans Saints	Tavon Rooks	T	Kansas State	
6	203	Indianapolis Colts	Andrew Jackson	LB	Western Kentucky	
6	204	Carolina Panthers	Tyler Gaffney	RB	Stanford	
6	205	Jacksonville Jaguars	Luke Bowanko	C	Virginia	from San Francisco (Note: No. 205: San Francisco → Jacksonville (PD). San Francisco traded a sixth-round selection (205th overall) to Jacksonville in exchange for QB Blaine Gabbert.)
6	206	New England Patriots	Jemea Thomas	S	Georgia Tech	
6	207	Denver Broncos	Matt Paradis	C	Boise State	
6	208	Seattle Seahawks	Eric Pinkins	S	San Diego State	
6*	209	New York Jets	Quincy Enunwa	WR	Nebraska	
6*	210	New York Jets	IK Enemkpali	DE	Louisiana Tech	
6*	211	Houston Texans	Jay Prosch	FB	Auburn	
6*	212	Cincinnati Bengals	Marquis Flowers	LB	Arizona	
6*	213	New York Jets	Tajh Boyd	QB	Clemson	
6*	214	St. Louis Rams	Garrett Gilbert	QB	SMU	
6*	215	Pittsburgh Steelers	Daniel McCullers	DT	Tennessee	
7	216	Houston Texans	Andre Hal	CB	Vanderbilt	
7	217	Washington Redskins	Ted Bolser	TE	Indiana	
7	218	Baltimore Ravens	Michael Campanaro	WR	Wake Forest	from Cleveland (Note: No. 218: Cleveland → Baltimore (D). Cleveland traded a seventh-round selection (218th overall) to Baltimore in exchange for a 2015 sixth-round selection.)
7	219	Oakland Raiders	Travis Carrie	CB	Ohio	
7	220	Minnesota Vikings	Shamar Stephen	DT	UConn	from Atlanta (Note: No. 220: Atlanta → Minnesota (D). See Round 5: No. 168: Minnesota → Atlanta.)
7	221	Buffalo Bills	Randell Johnson	LB	Florida Atlantic	from Tampa Bay (Note: No. 221: Tampa Bay → Buffalo (D). See Round 5: No. 149: Buffalo → Tampa Bay.)
7	222	Jacksonville Jaguars	Storm Johnson	RB	UCF	
7	223	Minnesota Vikings	Brandon Watts	LB	Georgia Tech	
7	224	Philadelphia Eagles	Beau Allen	DT	Wisconsin	from Buffalo (Note: No. 224: Buffalo → Philadelphia (D). Buffalo traded a seventh-round selection (224th overall) and a conditional future mid-round selection to Philadelphia in exchange for a seventh-round selection (237th overall) and RB Bryce Brown. The conditional future pick would be Buffalo's 2016 third-round selection if Brown hit certain statistical rushing targets in 2014; otherwise it would be either San Francisco's 2015 fourth-rounder (if the Bills received that pick as part of their trade of WR Stevie Johnson to San Francisco, which would occur were Johnson to miss certain statistical thresholds in 2014) or Buffalo's 2016 fourth-round selection.)
7	225	Minnesota Vikings	Jabari Price	CB	North Carolina	from NY Giants via Carolina (Note: No. 225: NY Giants → Carolina → Minnesota. Multiple trades: NY Giants → Carolina (PD). The NY Giants traded a seventh-round selection (225th overall) to Carolina in exchange for LB Jon Beason. Carolina → Minnesota (D). See Round 5: No. 148: Minnesota → Carolina.)
7	226	St. Louis Rams	Mitchell Van Dyk	T	Portland State	
7	227	Seattle Seahawks	Kiero Small	RB	Arkansas	from Detroit (Note: No. 227: Detroit → Seattle (D). See Round 2: No. 40: Seattle → Detroit.)
7	228	Washington Redskins	Zach Hocker	K	Arkansas	from Tennessee (Note: No. 228: Tennessee → Washington (D). See Round 6: No. 178: Washington → Tennessee.)
7	229	Detroit Lions	Nate Freese	K	Boston College	from Chicago via Dallas (Note: No. 229: Chicago → Dallas → Detroit. Multiple trades: Chicago → Dallas (PD). Chicago traded a seventh-round selection (229th overall) to Dallas in exchange for TE Dante Rosario. Dallas → Detroit (D). See Round 5: No. 146: Detroit → Dallas.)
7	230	Pittsburgh Steelers	Rob Blanchflower	TE	UMass	
7	231	Dallas Cowboys	Ben Gardner	DE	Stanford	
7	232	Indianapolis Colts	Ulrick John	T	Georgia State	from Baltimore (Note: No. 232: Baltimore → Indianapolis (PD). Baltimore traded a seventh-round selection (232nd overall) to Indianapolis in exchange for C A. Q. Shipley.)
7	233	New York Jets	Trevor Reilly	LB	Utah	
7	234	Miami Dolphins	Terrence Fede	DE	Marist	
7	235	Oakland Raiders	Shelby Harris	DE	Illinois State	from Arizona (Note: No. 235: Arizona → Oakland (PD). Arizona traded a seventh-round selection (235th overall) and a 2013 sixth-round selection to Oakland in exchange for a conditional 2013 seventh-round selection and QB Carson Palmer. The 2013 seventh-round selection was contingent on Palmer starting at least 13 games for Arizona in the 2013 season; Palmer started all 16 of Arizona's games.)
7	236	Green Bay Packers	Jeff Janis	WR	Saginaw Valley State	
7	237	Buffalo Bills	Seantrel Henderson	T	Miami (FL)	from Philadelphia (Note: No. 237: Philadelphia → Buffalo (D). See Round 7: No. 224: Buffalo → Philadelphia.)
7	238	Dallas Cowboys	Will Smith	LB	Texas Tech	from Kansas City (Note: No. 238: Kansas City → Dallas (PD). See Round 6: No. 193: Dallas → Kansas City.)
7	239	Cincinnati Bengals	James Wright	WR	LSU	
7	240	San Diego Chargers	Tevin Reese	WR	Baylor	
7	241	St. Louis Rams	Christian Bryant	S	Ohio State	from Indianapolis (Note: No. 241: Indianapolis → St. Louis (PD). Indianapolis traded a seventh-round selection (241st overall) to St. Louis in exchange for CB Josh Gordy.)
7	242	Denver Broncos	Corey Nelson	LB	Oklahoma	from New Orleans via San Francisco (Note: No. 242: New Orleans → San Francisco → Denver. Multiple trades: New Orleans → San Francisco (PD). New Orleans traded a seventh-round selection (242nd overall) to San Francisco in exchange for LB Parys Haralson. San Francisco → Denver (D). See Round 2: No. 56: San Francisco → Denver.)
7	243	San Francisco 49ers	Kaleb Ramsey	DT	Boston College	from Carolina (Note: No. 243: Carolina → San Francisco (PD). Carolina traded a seventh-round selection (243rd overall) to San Francisco in exchange for S Colin Jones.)
7	244	New England Patriots	Jeremy Gallon	WR	Michigan	
7	245	San Francisco 49ers	Trey Millard	FB	Oklahoma	
7	246	Chicago Bears	Charles Leno ^{†}	T	Boise State	from Denver (Note: No. 246: Denver → Chicago (D). See Round 4: No. 131: Denver → Chicago.)
7	247	Oakland Raiders	Jonathan Dowling	S	Western Kentucky	from Seattle (Note: No. 247: Seattle → Oakland (PD). Seattle traded a seventh-round selection (247th overall) to Oakland in exchange for QB Terrelle Pryor.)
7*	248	Dallas Cowboys	Ahmad Dixon	S	Baylor	
7*	249	St. Louis Rams	Michael Sam	DE	Missouri	First openly gay player to be selected in the NFL draft
7*	250	St. Louis Rams	Demetrius Rhaney	C	Tennessee State	
7*	251	Dallas Cowboys	Ken Bishop	DT	Northern Illinois	
7*	252	Cincinnati Bengals	Lavelle Westbrooks	CB	Georgia Southern	
7*	253	Atlanta Falcons	Yawin Smallwood	LB	UConn	
7*	254	Dallas Cowboys	Terrance Mitchell	CB	Oregon	
7*	255	Atlanta Falcons	Tyler Starr	LB	South Dakota	
7*	256	Houston Texans	Lonnie Ballentine	S	Memphis	"Mr. Irrelevant"

== Notable undrafted players ==
†	Pro Bowler

Original NFL team	Player	Pos.	College	Notes
Arizona Cardinals	Chandler Catanzaro	K	Clemson	
Arizona Cardinals	Anthony Steen	C	Alabama	
Atlanta Falcons	Sergio Castillo	K	West Texas A&M	
Atlanta Falcons	Roosevelt Nix ^{†}	FB	Kent State	
Atlanta Falcons	James Stone	C	Tennessee	
Baltimore Ravens	James Hurst	T	North Carolina	
Baltimore Ravens	Jamie Meder	DT	Ashland	
Baltimore Ravens	Zach Orr	LB	North Texas	
Baltimore Ravens	Fitzgerald Toussaint	RB	Michigan	
Carolina Panthers	Corey Brown	WR	Ohio State	
Carolina Panthers	Andrew Norwell	G	Ohio State	
Carolina Panthers	Jeremiah Sirles	T	Nebraska	
Carolina Panthers	Adarius Taylor	LB	Florida Atlantic	
Chicago Bears	Ryan Groy	C	Wisconsin	
Chicago Bears	Christian Jones	LB	Florida State	
Cincinnati Bengals	Trey Hopkins	G	Texas	
Cleveland Browns	Isaiah Crowell	RB	Alabama State	
Cleveland Browns	Taylor Gabriel	WR	Abilene Christian	
Cleveland Browns	Connor Shaw	QB	South Carolina	
Cleveland Browns	Willie Snead IV	WR	Ball State	
Cleveland Browns	K'Waun Williams	CB	Pittsburgh	
Dallas Cowboys	Casey Kreiter ^{†}	LS	Iowa	
Dallas Cowboys	Tyler Patmon	CB	Oklahoma State	
Dallas Cowboys	Keith Smith	LB	San Jose State	
Denver Broncos	Shaquil Barrett ^{†}	LB	Colorado State	
Denver Broncos	Kapri Bibbs	WR	Colorado State	
Denver Broncos	Bennie Fowler	RB	Michigan State	
Denver Broncos	Juwan Thompson	RB	Duke	
Denver Broncos	Lou Young III	CB	Georgia Tech	
Detroit Lions	Cornelius Lucas	T	Kansas State	
Green Bay Packers	Joe Thomas	LB	South Carolina State	
Houston Texans	Chris Boswell ^{†}	K	Rice	
Houston Texans	Matt Feiler	G	Bloomsburg	
Houston Texans	James Ferentz	C	Iowa	
Houston Texans	Marcus Williams	CB	North Dakota State	
Houston Texans	Bryan Witzmann	G	South Dakota State	
Indianapolis Colts	Zach Kerr	DT	Delaware	
Indianapolis Colts	Cody Parkey ^{†}	K	Auburn	
Jacksonville Jaguars	Allen Hurns	WR	Miami (FL)	
Jacksonville Jaguars	Tyler Shatley	G	Clemson	
Kansas City Chiefs	Cairo Santos	K	Tulane	
Kansas City Chiefs	Daniel Sorensen	S	BYU	
Kansas City Chiefs	Charcandrick West	RB	Abilene Christian	
Kansas City Chiefs	Albert Wilson	WR	Georgia State	
Miami Dolphins	Orleans Darkwa	RB	Tulane	
Miami Dolphins	Tyler Larsen	C	Utah State	
Miami Dolphins	Damien Williams	RB	Oklahoma	
New England Patriots	Malcolm Butler ^{†}	CB	West Alabama	
New England Patriots	Shamiel Gary	S	Oklahoma State	
New England Patriots	Tyler Ott ^{†}	LS	Harvard	
New England Patriots	Deontae Skinner	LB	Mississippi State	
New Orleans Saints	Todd Davis	LB	Sacramento State	
New Orleans Saints	Pierre Warren	S	Jacksonville State	
New York Giants	Xavier Grimble	TE	USC	
New York Giants	Kerry Wynn	DE	Richmond	
New York Jets	Kerry Hyder	DE	Texas Tech	
Oakland Raiders	Denico Autry	DT	Mississippi State	
Oakland Raiders	Michael Palardy	P	Tennessee	
Philadelphia Eagles	Trey Burton	TE	Florida	
Pittsburgh Steelers	Jordan Berry	P	Eastern Kentucky	
Pittsburgh Steelers	C. J. Goodwin	CB	PennWest California	
Pittsburgh Steelers	Josh Mauro	DE	Stanford	
San Diego Chargers	Branden Oliver	RB	Buffalo	
San Diego Chargers	Adrian Phillips ^{†}	S	Texas	
Seattle Seahawks	Brock Coyle	LB	Montana	
Seattle Seahawks	Garry Gilliam	T	Penn State	
Tampa Bay Buccaneers	Cameron Brate	TE	Harvard	
Tennessee Titans	Justin McCray	G	UCF	

== Trades ==
In the explanations below, (D) denotes trades that took place during the 2014 draft, while (PD) indicates trades completed pre-draft.

Round 1

Round 2

Round 3

Round 4

Round 5

Round 6

Round 7

== Supplemental draft ==
The supplemental draft was held on July 10, 2014. For each player selected in the supplemental draft, the team forfeits its pick in that round in the draft of the following season. Four players were eligible, but for the second straight year no players were selected.

== Summary ==
The Southeastern Conference (SEC) led all college athletic conferences in terms of first round selections with eleven, including the first two picks of the draft. For the first time since the league's second draft in 1937, no player from the University of Texas was selected.

For the second year in succession—and only the second time since 1967—no running back was selected in the first round. The first player taken at the position was Bishop Sankey, who was selected in the second round with the 54th overall pick. This is the latest point in the history of the draft for the first running back to be selected.

=== Selections by college athletic conference ===
Conference	Round 1	Round 2	Round 3	Round 4	Round 5	Round 6	Round 7	Total
NCAA Division I FBS football conferences
The American	4	0	1	0	1	2	4	12
ACC	5	3	7	13	3	5	6	42
Big 12	2	1	2	2	2	3	5	17
Big Ten	4	6	6	4	5	1	4	30
C-USA	0	0	2	1	3	2	1	9
MAC	2	0	1	0	1	1	3	8
MWC	0	5	1	3	2	4	1	16
Pac-12	3	6	4	8	5	5	3	34
SEC	11	7	5	3	10	8	5	49
Sun Belt	0	0	0	0	1	1	2	4
Ind.	1	3	2	1	0	2	0	9
NCAA Division I FCS football conferences
Big Sky	0	0	0	0	1	0	1	2
Big South	0	0	0	2	0	1	0	3
CAA	0	0	1	0	0	1	0	2
Ivy	0	0	0	0	1	0	0	1
MVFC	0	0	1	0	0	0	2	3
OVC	0	1	0	0	1	1	1	4
PFL	0	0	0	0	0	0	1	1
SoCon	0	0	1	1	0	0	1	3
Non-Division I football conferences
GLIAC (DII)	0	0	0	0	0	0	1	1
MIAA (DII)	0	0	1	1	0	1	0	3
NSIC (DII)	0	0	0	0	0	1	0	1
PSAC (DII)	0	0	0	1	0	0	0	1
RSEQ (CIS)	0	0	0	0	0	1	0	1

=== Schools with multiple draft selections ===
Selections	Schools
9	LSU
8	Alabama, Notre Dame
7	Florida State
6	Ohio State, Stanford
5	Baylor, Clemson, North Carolina, UCLA, Wisconsin
4	Arkansas, Auburn, Boston College, Florida, Louisville, Missouri, Oklahoma, Oregon
3	Arizona, Arizona State, Boise State, Georgia Tech, Iowa, Miami, Michigan, Nebraska, Penn State, Pittsburgh, Tennessee, Texas A&M, USC, Vanderbilt, Virginia, Virginia Tech
2	Ball State, California, Coastal Carolina, Colorado State, Connecticut, Florida Atlantic, Fresno State, Georgia, Georgia Southern, Indiana, Louisiana Tech, Minnesota, Northern Illinois, Oregon State, Purdue, San Diego State, San Jose State, SMU, South Carolina, Syracuse, Tennessee State, Texas Tech, UCF, Utah, Utah State, Washington, West Virginia, Western Kentucky, Wyoming

=== Selections by position ===
Position	Round 1	Round 2	Round 3	Round 4	Round 5	Round 6	Round 7	Total
Center	0	1	2	2	2	2	1	10
Cornerback	5	1	2	9	4	7	5	33
Defensive end	2	3	3	2	5	3	2	22
Defensive tackle	2	3	4	3	3	1	4	20
Guard	0	1	6	1	4	2	0	14
Linebacker	5	3	3	5	8	3	7	34
Offensive tackle	5	4	3	1	1	3	4	21
Placekicker	0	0	0	0	0	0	2	2
Punter	0	0	0	0	0	1	0	1
Quarterback	3	2	0	2	2	5	2	16
Running back	0	3	5	5	0	4	2	19
Safety	4	1	2	4	3	2	4	20
Tight end	1	3	3	0	1	0	2	10
Wide receiver	5	7	3	6	3	5	5	34

Position	Round 1	Round 2	Round 3	Round 4	Round 5	Round 6	Round 7	Total
Offense	14	21	22	17	13	21	16	124
Defense	18	11	14	23	23	16	24	129
Special teams	0	0	0	0	0	1	2	3

== U.S. television coverage ==
The draft was broadcast live by the NFL Network and ESPN. This marks the 35th year of draft coverage on ESPN, while the NFL Network had covered the draft since its inception in 2004.

The two networks' combined first-round coverage drew a record 32 million viewers according to Nielsen ratings which was a 28 percent increase over the previous year. In total, 45.7 million viewers watched some part of the three-day event, topping the previous record of 45.4 million set in 2010.

== In popular culture ==
- The events of the 2014 film Draft Day, take place during the fictionalized 2014 NFL draft.
- The 2014 NFL draft was also featured in The League.
