= 2013 UT Martin Skyhawks football team =

American college football season

2013 UT Martin Skyhawks football
- Conference: Ohio Valley Conference
- Record: 7–5 (5–3 OVC)
- Head coach: Jason Simpson (8th season)
- Offensive coordinator: Carmen Felus (3rd season)
- Defensive coordinator: Jeff Byrd (2nd season)
- Home stadium: Graham Stadium

2013 Ohio Valley Conference football standings
	Conf.			Overall
Team	W		L	W		L
No. 4 Eastern Illinois $^	8	–	0	12	–	2
No. 17 Tennessee State ^	6	–	2	10	–	4
No. 10 Jacksonville State ^	5	–	3	11	–	4
UT Martin	5	–	3	7	–	5
Eastern Kentucky	4	–	4	6	–	6
Murray State	4	–	4	6	–	6
Tennessee Tech	2	–	6	5	–	7
Southeast Missouri State	2	–	6	3	–	9
Austin Peay	0	–	8	0	–	12
$ – Conference champion; ^ – FCS playoff participant; Rankings from The Sports Network poll

The 2013 UT Martin Skyhawks football team represented the University of Tennessee at Martin as a member of the Ohio Valley Conference (OVC) during the 2013 NCAA Division I FCS football season. Led by eighth-year head coach Jason Simpson, the Skyhawks compiled an overall record of 7–5 with a mark of 5–3 in conference play, tying for third place in the OVC. UT Martin played home games at Graham Stadium in Martin, Tennessee.

== Schedule ==
Date	Time	Opponent	Rank	Site	TV	Result	Attendance
August 29	6:00 pm	at No. 24 Chattanooga*		Finley Stadium; Chattanooga, TN		W 31–21	11,163
September 7	2:00 pm	at Boise State*		Bronco Stadium; Boise, ID	ESPN3	L 14–63	33,293
September 14	6:00 pm	No. 8 Central Arkansas*		Graham Stadium; Martin, TN	OVCDN	W 24–23	5,061
September 28	6:00 pm	at Southeast Missouri State	No. 23	Houck Stadium; Cape Girardeau, MO	OVCDN	W 17–7	8,074
October 5	2:00 pm	Jacksonville State^{†}	No. 22	Graham Stadium; Martin, TN	ESPN3	L 27–41	4,981
October 10	7:00 pm	at Tennessee Tech		Tucker Stadium; Cookeville, TN (Sgt. York Trophy)	OVCDN	W 28–17	7,222
October 19	1:00 pm	No. 24 Tennessee State		Graham Stadium; Martin, TN (Sgt. York Trophy])	OVCDN	L 15–29	4,166
October 26	4:00 pm	at Austin Peay		Governors Stadium; Clarksville, TN (Sgt. York Trophy)	OVCDN	W 38–14	6,014
November 2	1:00 pm	Murray State		Graham Stadium; Martin, TN	OVCDN	W 45–17	4,817
November 9	3:30 pm	at Memphis*		Liberty Bowl Memorial Stadium; Memphis, TN	ESPN3	L 6–21	24,487
November 16	12:00 pm	at Eastern Kentucky		Roy Kidd Stadium; Richmond, KY	OVCDN	W 16–7	5,100
November 23	1:00 pm	No. 2 Eastern Illinois		Graham Stadium; Martin, TN	ESPN3	L 22–70	3,167
*Non-conference game; ^{†}Homecoming; Rankings from The Sports Network Poll released prior to the game; All times are in Central time
