= 2013 Eastern Kentucky Colonels football team =

American college football season

2013 Eastern Kentucky Colonels football
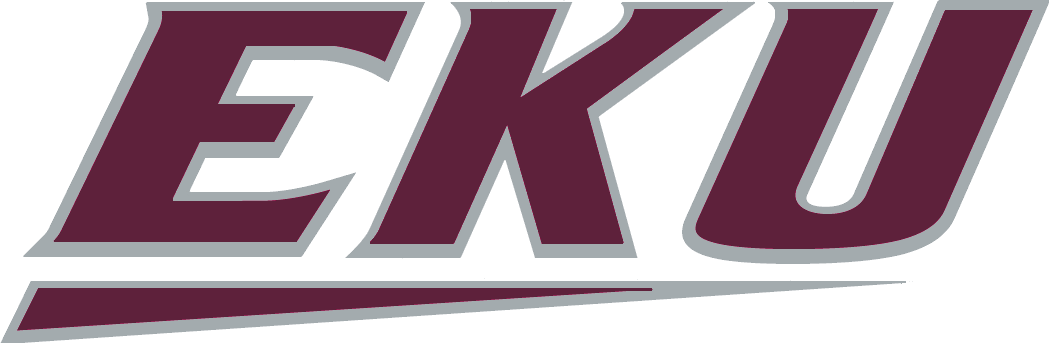
- Conference: Ohio Valley Conference
- Record: 6–6 (4–4 OVC)
- Head coach: Dean Hood (6th season)
- Offensive coordinator: Dane Damron (3rd season)
- Defensive coordinator: Tony Hatmaker (3rd season)
- Home stadium: Roy Kidd Stadium

2013 Ohio Valley Conference football standings
	Conf.			Overall
Team	W		L	W		L
No. 4 Eastern Illinois $^	8	–	0	12	–	2
No. 17 Tennessee State ^	6	–	2	10	–	4
No. 10 Jacksonville State ^	5	–	3	11	–	4
UT Martin	5	–	3	7	–	5
Eastern Kentucky	4	–	4	6	–	6
Murray State	4	–	4	6	–	6
Tennessee Tech	2	–	6	5	–	7
Southeast Missouri State	2	–	6	3	–	9
Austin Peay	0	–	8	0	–	12
$ – Conference champion; ^ – FCS playoff participant; Rankings from The Sports Network poll

The 2013 Eastern Kentucky Colonels football team represented Eastern Kentucky University during the 2013 NCAA Division I FCS football season. They were led by sixth year head coach Dean Hood and played their home games at Roy Kidd Stadium. They were a member of the Ohio Valley Conference (OVC). Eastern Kentucky had an overall record of 6–6 with a mark of 4–4 in OVC play to finish in a tie for fifth place.

== Schedule ==
Date	Time	Opponent	Site	TV	Result	Attendance
August 29	7:00 pm	Robert Morris*	Roy Kidd Stadium; Richmond, KY	OVCDN	W 38–6	12,200
September 7	12:00 pm	at No. 8 (FBS) Louisville*	Papa John's Cardinal Stadium; Louisville, KY	ESPN3	L 7–44	53,647
September 14	6:00 pm	No. 21 Coastal Carolina*	Roy Kidd Stadium; Richmond, KY	OVCDN	L 32–51	14,500
September 21	7:00 pm	at Morehead State*	Jayne Stadium; Morehead, KY	OVCDN	W 56–24	8,115
September 28	2:30 pm	at No. 8 Eastern Illinois	O'Brien Stadium; Charleston, IL	ESPN3	L 7–42	11,469
October 5	6:00 pm	Austin Peay	Roy Kidd Stadium; Richmond, KY	OVCDN	W 38–3	7,400
October 19	3:00 pm	Tennessee Tech^{†}	Roy Kidd Stadium; Richmond, KY	OVCDN	W 24–10	6,800
October 26	2:00 pm	at Southeast Missouri State	Houck Stadium; Cape Girardeau, MO	ESPN3	W 31–7	5,171
November 2	2:00 pm	No. 23 Tennessee State	Roy Kidd Stadium; Richmond, KY	ESPN3	W 44–0	5,700
November 9	4:00 pm	at Jacksonville State	JSU Stadium; Jacksonville, AL	OVCDN	L 10–68	16,876
November 16	1:00 pm	UT Martin	Roy Kidd Stadium; Richmond, KY	OVCDN	L 7–16	5,100
November 23	1:00 pm	at Murray State	Roy Stewart Stadium; Murray, KY	OVCDN	L 27–34 ^{OT}	2,299
*Non-conference game; ^{†}Homecoming; Rankings from The Sports Network Poll released prior to the game; All times are in Eastern time

- Source: Schedule

== Ranking movements ==
Ranking movements Legend: ██ Increase in ranking ██ Decrease in ranking — = Not ranked RV = Received votes
	Week														
Poll	Pre	1	2	3	4	5	6	7	8	9	10	11	12	13	Final
Sports Network	RV	RV	RV	RV	RV	—	—	—	—	RV	RV	RV	RV	RV	RV
Coaches	19	21	25	RV	—	—	—	—	—	—	RV	—	—	—	—
