= Shamiel Gary =

American football player (born 1990)

No. 27, 37
- Position: Safety

Personal information
- Born: May 31, 1990 (age 36); Tulsa, Oklahoma, U.S.
- Listed height: 6 ft 0 in (1.83 m)
- Listed weight: 205 lb (93 kg)

Career information
- High school: Booker T. Washington (Tulsa)
- College: Oklahoma State
- NFL draft: 2014: undrafted

Career history
- New England Patriots (2014)*; Chicago Bears (2014); Boston Brawlers (2014); Miami Dolphins (2015); Minnesota Vikings (2016)*; New England Patriots (2016)*; Buffalo Bills (2016)
- * Offseason or practice squad member only

Career NFL statistics
- Total tackles: 12
- Stats at Pro Football Reference

Shamiel Gary (born May 31, 1990) is an American former professional football player who was a safety in the National Football League (NFL). He played his first two college football seasons with the Wyoming Cowboys, earning Freshman All-American honors, before transferring to Oklahoma State Cowboys and redshirting in 2011. He was signed by the New England Patriots as an undrafted free agent in 2014. He also played for the Chicago Bears.

== Early life ==
Shamiel Gary was born in Tulsa, Oklahoma, on May 31, 1990, to Gwen Evans and Steven Gary. He attended Booker T. Washington High School in Tulsa (OK), where he played safety for head coach Antwain Jimmerson. As a senior, he helped lead the Hornets to a 13–1 record and an Oklahoma 5A State Championship, as he recorded 124 tackles and 8.0 sacks. In the same year he was named the 5A District 3 Defensive Player of the Year.

== College career ==
Out of high school, Gary was recruited by Air Force, Kansas State, and Wyoming. He chose to attend the latter, where he played strong safety for head coach Dave Christensen. On September 5, 2009, in the season opener versus Weber State, Gary recorded 7 tackles and three interceptions. As a true freshman, he started 12 of 13 games at strong safety, tied the team lead in interceptions (3) and ranked fifth on the team in tackles (98). In 2010, he recorded 94 tackles, 5 passes defended and one interception. At the end of his sophomore season he transferred to Oklahoma State to be closer to his family and his grandmother, who was battling Alzheimer's disease. He sat out the 2011 season due to the NCAA transfer rules. In 2012, he started every game for the Cowboys, recording 72 tackles, 6 passes defended, three interceptions and one forced fumble. As a senior, he recorded 47 tackles, 9 passes defended and three interceptions, as he helped lead the Oklahoma State Cowboys to a 10–3 record and a 2nd place in the Big 12 Conference. At the end of the season, the Cowboys were invited to the Cotton Bowl Classic, where they lost to Missouri by a score of 31–41. Gary recorded one tackle during the game.

== Professional career ==
=== New England Patriots ===
Gary was not drafted during the 2014 NFL draft. On May 12, 2014, he was signed by the New England Patriots as an undrafted free agent. On August 30, 2014, he was released by the Patriots in order to get down to the 53-man active roster limit.

=== Chicago Bears ===
On October 8, 2014, Gary was signed by the Chicago Bears to a one-year contract, following injuries to Bears' safeties Chris Conte and Ahmad Dixon. He was waived by the team on October 11, 2014, and then signed to the Bears' practice squad on October 13, 2014.

=== Miami Dolphins ===
On January 8, 2015, Gary signed a futures contract with the Miami Dolphins. On August 10, 2015, he was waived by the Dolphins. On November 3, 2015, he was again signed to the Dolphins' practice squad. On November 28, 2015, he was promoted to the active roster.

On September 3, 2016, Gary was released by the Dolphins.

=== Minnesota Vikings ===
On September 5, 2016, Gary was signed to the Vikings' practice squad. On September 13, he was released from their practice squad.

=== Second stint with Patriots ===
On October 25, 2016, Gary was signed to the Patriots' practice squad. On November 26, 2016, he was released from their practice squad.

=== Buffalo Bills ===
On December 1, 2016, Gary was signed to the Bills' practice squad. On December 13, 2016, he was promoted to the active roster. He was waived on September 2, 2017.

=== NFL statistics ===
Year	Team	GP	COMB	TOTAL	AST	SACK	FF	FR	FR YDS	INT	IR YDS	AVG IR	LNG	TD	PD
2015	MIA	6	11	8	3	0.0	0	0	0	0	0	0	0	0	0
Career		6	11	8	3	0.0	0	0	0	0	0	0	0	0	0
