= 2013 Austin Peay Governors football team =

American college football season

2013 Austin Peay Governors football
- Conference: Ohio Valley Conference
- Record: 0–12 (0–8 OVC)
- Head coach: Kirby Cannon (1st season)
- Defensive coordinator: Granville Eastman (9th season)
- Home stadium: Governors Stadium

2013 Ohio Valley Conference football standings
	Conf.			Overall
Team	W		L	W		L
No. 4 Eastern Illinois $^	8	–	0	12	–	2
No. 17 Tennessee State ^	6	–	2	10	–	4
No. 10 Jacksonville State ^	5	–	3	11	–	4
UT Martin	5	–	3	7	–	5
Eastern Kentucky	4	–	4	6	–	6
Murray State	4	–	4	6	–	6
Tennessee Tech	2	–	6	5	–	7
Southeast Missouri State	2	–	6	3	–	9
Austin Peay	0	–	8	0	–	12
$ – Conference champion; ^ – FCS playoff participant; Rankings from The Sports Network poll

The 2013 Austin Peay Governors football team represented Austin Peay State University during the 2013 NCAA Division I FCS football season. The Governors were led by first-year head coach Kirby Cannon, played their home games at Governors Stadium, and were a member of the Ohio Valley Conference. They finished the season 0–12, 0–8 in OVC play to finish in last place.

== Schedule ==
Date	Time	Opponent	Site	TV	Result	Attendance
August 31	5:00 pm	at Tennessee*	Neyland Stadium; Knoxville, TN	PPV	L 0–45	97,169
September 7	6:30 pm	at Vanderbilt*	Vanderbilt Stadium; Nashville, TN	CSS	L 3–38	33,162
September 14	5:00 pm	at Chattanooga*	Finley Stadium; Chattanooga, TN		L 10–42	9,189
September 21	1:00 pm	at Ohio*	Peden Stadium; Athens, OH		L 0–38	19,547
October 5	5:00 pm	at Eastern Kentucky	Roy Kidd Stadium; Richmond, KY	OVCDN	L 3–38	7,400
October 12	7:00 pm	No. 5 Eastern Illinois	Governors Stadium; Clarksville, TN	APSU-TV	L 7–63	5,501
October 19	3:00 pm	at Murray State	Roy Stewart Stadium; Murray, KY	ESPN3	L 3–31	6,847
October 26	4:00 pm	UT Martin^{†}	Governors Stadium; Clarksville, TN (Sgt. York Trophy)	APSU-TV	L 14–38	6,014
November 2	1:00 pm	Jacksonville State	Governors Stadium; Clarksville, TN	APSU-TV	L 10–42	4,010
November 9	2:00 pm	at Tennessee State	LP Field; Nashville, TN (Sgt. York Trophy)	OVCDN	L 6–31	5,258
November 16	1:00 pm	Southeast Missouri State	Governors Stadium; Clarksville, TN	APSU-TV	L 34–36	4,267
November 23	1:30 pm	at Tennessee Tech	Tucker Stadium; Cookeville, TN (Sgt. York Trophy)	OVCDN	L 0–34	4,110
*Non-conference game; ^{†}Homecoming; Rankings from The Sports Network Poll released prior to the game; All times are in Central time
