= Lonnie Ballentine =

American football player (born 1993)

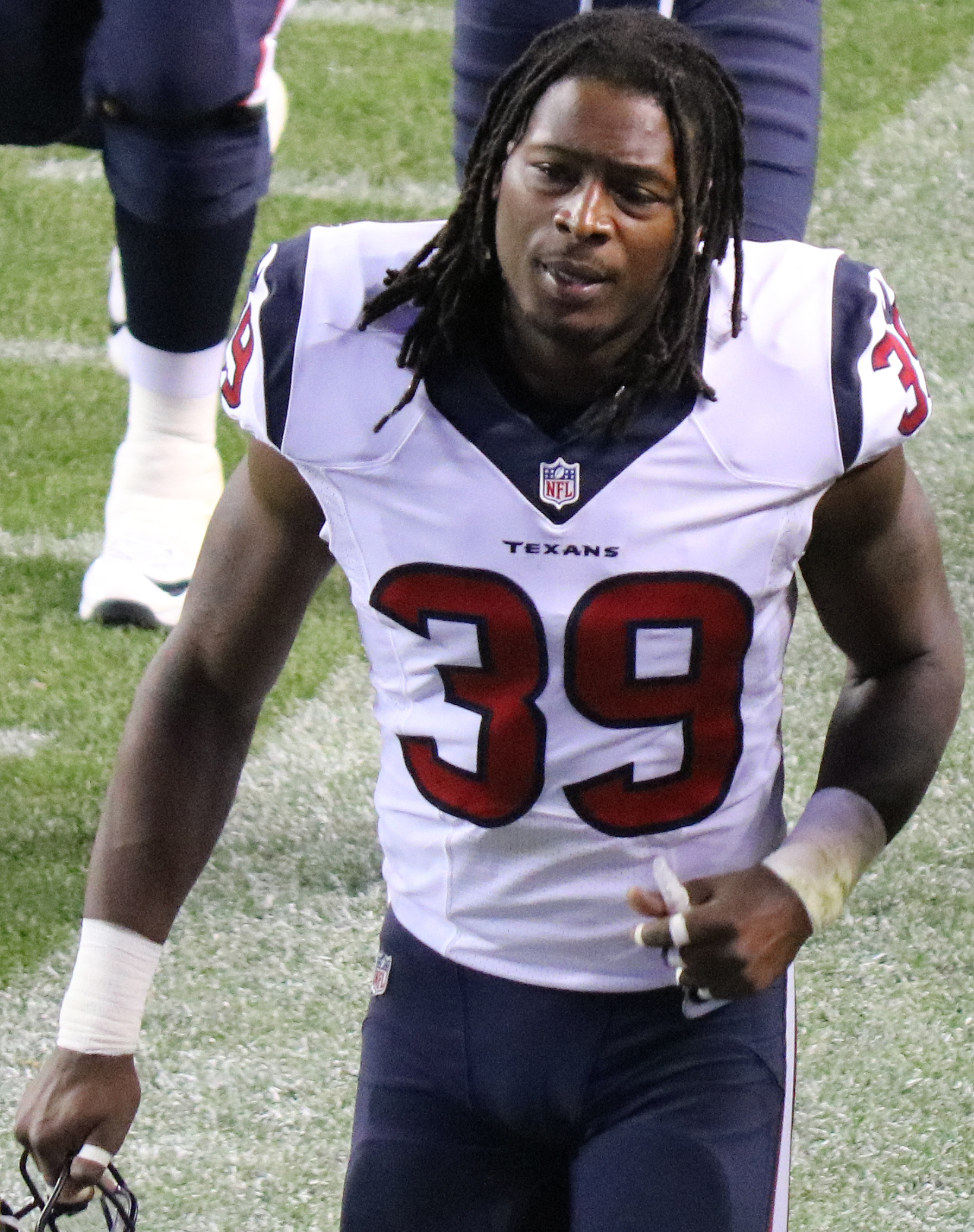
- Ballentine with the Houston Texans in 2016

No. 39
- Position: Safety

Personal information
- Born: April 23, 1993 (age 33); Memphis, Tennessee, U.S.
- Listed height: 6 ft 3 in (1.91 m)
- Listed weight: 225 lb (102 kg)

Career information
- High school: Southwind (Memphis, Tennessee)
- College: Memphis (2010–2013)
- NFL draft: 2014: 7th round, 256th overall pick

Career history
- Houston Texans (2014–2016)

Career NFL statistics
- Total tackles: 3
- Pass deflections: 1
- Stats at Pro Football Reference

Lonnie Ballentine (born April 23, 1993) is an American former professional football player who was a safety in the National Football League (NFL). He was selected by the Houston Texans with the final pick (256th overall) of the 2014 NFL draft, making him Mr. Irrelevant for 2014. He played college football at Memphis.

== Early life ==
Ballentine graduated from Southwind High School early as a junior. As a junior, he had 45 tackles, 6 interceptions and 12 pass breakups. He only played 1 year of varsity football. He also played basketball and ran track in high school.

== College career ==
In his freshman year in 2010, Ballentine had 13 tackles and 2 pass breakups while starting 1 game. His sophomore season he had 28 tackles and 1 pass breakup while starting several games and having 2 tackles for loss. His Junior season he had 3 interceptions and 66 total tackles to go with 5 pass breakups. He also was an All C-USA Honorable Mention that year as well. His Senior season, he was a preseason 4th team All C-USA selection and finished the year with 58 tackles and 5 pass breakups during the year while starting all 12 games.

== Professional career ==
Ballentine did not attend the NFL Combine but was selected with the final pick, 256th overall, of the 2014 NFL draft. He signed a 4-year, $2.27 million contract with the Texans.

On August 30, 2016, Ballentine was placed on reserve/PUP to start the 2016 season. He was activated to the active roster on October 22, 2016. On November 12, Ballentine was placed on injured reserve.

On September 2, 2017, Ballentine was waived/injured by the Texans and placed on injured reserve. He was released on September 8, 2017.
