= 2013 Tennessee Tech Golden Eagles football team =

American college football season

2013 Tennessee Tech Golden Eagles football
- Conference: Ohio Valley Conference
- Record: 5–7 (2–6 OVC)
- Head coach: Watson Brown (7th season)
- Offensive coordinator: Steven Brown (2nd season)
- Offensive scheme: Multiple spread
- Defensive coordinator: Donn Landholm (1st season)
- Base defense: Multiple 4–2–5
- Home stadium: Tucker Stadium

2013 Ohio Valley Conference football standings
	Conf.			Overall
Team	W		L	W		L
No. 4 Eastern Illinois $^	8	–	0	12	–	2
No. 17 Tennessee State ^	6	–	2	10	–	4
No. 10 Jacksonville State ^	5	–	3	11	–	4
UT Martin	5	–	3	7	–	5
Eastern Kentucky	4	–	4	6	–	6
Murray State	4	–	4	6	–	6
Tennessee Tech	2	–	6	5	–	7
Southeast Missouri State	2	–	6	3	–	9
Austin Peay	0	–	8	0	–	12
$ – Conference champion; ^ – FCS playoff participant; Rankings from The Sports Network poll

The 2013 Tennessee Tech Golden Eagles football team represented Tennessee Technological University as a member of Ohio Valley Conference (OVC) during the 2013 NCAA Division I FCS football season. Led by seventh-year head coach Watson Brown, the Golden Eagles compiled an overall record of 5–7 overall with a mark of 2–6 in conference play, tying for seventh place in the OVC. Tennessee Tech played home games at Tucker Stadium in Cookeville, Tennessee.

== Schedule ==
Date	Time	Opponent	Site	TV	Result	Attendance
August 29	7:00 pm	Cumberland (TN)*	Tucker Stadium; Cookeville, TN	WCTE	W 63–7	11,807
September 7	11:00 am	at No. 21 (FBS) Wisconsin*	Camp Randall Stadium; Madison, WI	BTN	L 0–48	77,785
September 14	5:00 pm	at Hampton*	Armstrong Stadium; Hampton, VA		W 30–27	2,709
September 21	7:00 pm	Tennessee State	Tucker Stadium; Cookeville, TN (Sgt. York Trophy)	ESPN3	L 21–41	10,044
September 28	7:00 pm	Indiana State*	Tucker Stadium; Cookeville, TN	WCTE	W 38–37	8,970
October 5	3:00 pm	at Murray State	Roy Stewart Stadium; Murray, KY	OVCDN	L 24–35	4,922
October 10	7:00 pm	UT Martin	Tucker Stadium; Cookeville, TN (Sgt. York Trophy)	WCTE	L 17–28	7,222
October 19	2:00 pm	at Eastern Kentucky	Roy Kidd Stadium; Richmond, KY	OVCDN	L 10–24	6,800
October 26	1:30 pm	Jacksonville State^{†}	Tucker Stadium; Cookeville, TN	WCTE	L 14–34	8,953
November 2	12:00 pm	at No. 2 Eastern Illinois	O'Brien Field; Charleston, IL	OVCDN	L 21–56	6,939
November 9	1:00 pm	at Southeast Missouri State	Houck Stadium; Cape Girardeau, MO	OVCDN	W 41–16	2,206
November 23	1:30 pm	Austin Peay	Tucker Stadium; Cookeville, TN (Sgt. York Trophy)	WCTE	W 34–0	4,110
*Non-conference game; ^{†}Homecoming; Rankings from The Sports Network Poll released prior to the game; All times are in Central time
