= 2013 Southeast Missouri State Redhawks football team =

American college football season

2013 Southeast Missouri State Redhawks football
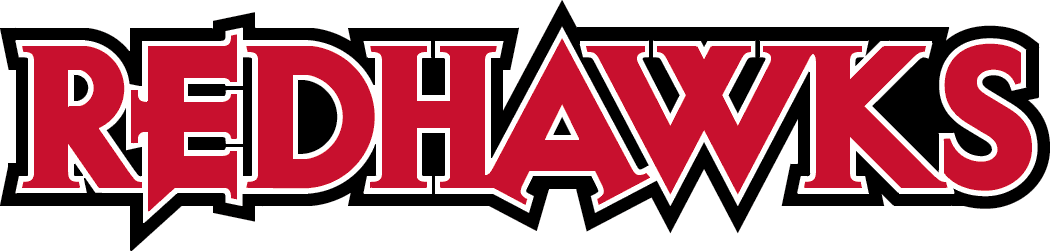
- Conference: Ohio Valley Conference
- Record: 3–9 (2–6 OVC)
- Head coach: Tony Samuel (8th season)
- Offensive coordinator: Tim McGuire (3rd season)
- Defensive coordinator: Brian Mohnsen (3rd season)
- Home stadium: Houck Stadium

2013 Ohio Valley Conference football standings
	Conf.			Overall
Team	W		L	W		L
No. 4 Eastern Illinois $^	8	–	0	12	–	2
No. 17 Tennessee State ^	6	–	2	10	–	4
No. 10 Jacksonville State ^	5	–	3	11	–	4
UT Martin	5	–	3	7	–	5
Eastern Kentucky	4	–	4	6	–	6
Murray State	4	–	4	6	–	6
Tennessee Tech	2	–	6	5	–	7
Southeast Missouri State	2	–	6	3	–	9
Austin Peay	0	–	8	0	–	12
$ – Conference champion; ^ – FCS playoff participant; Rankings from The Sports Network poll

The 2013 Southeast Missouri State Redhawks football team represented Southeast Missouri State University as a member of the Ohio Valley Conference (OVC) during the 2013 NCAA Division I FCS football season. Led by Tony Samuel in his eighth and final year as head coach, the Redhawks compiled an overall record of 3–9 with a mark of 2–6 in conference play, tying for seventh place in the OVC. Southeast Missouri State played home games at Houck Stadium in Cape Girardeau, Missouri.

== Schedule ==
Date	Time	Opponent	Site	TV	Result	Attendance
August 29	7:00 pm	at Southeastern Louisiana*	Strawberry Stadium; Hammond, LA	SELUC	L 7–45	5,820
September 7	6:00 pm	at Ole Miss*	Vaught–Hemingway Stadium; Oxford, MS	ESPN3	L 13–31	60,815
September 21	1:00 pm	vs. Southern Illinois*	Busch Stadium; St. Louis, MO (College Classic)		L 19–36	14,618
September 28	6:00 pm	No. 23 UT Martin	Houck Stadium; Cape Girardeau, MO	OVCDN	L 7–17	8,074
October 5	6:00 pm	at Tennessee State	LP Field; Nashville, TN	OVCDN	L 16–40	7,374
October 12	1:00 pm	Murray State	Houck Stadium; Cape Girardeau, MO	OVCDN	W 37–34 ^{3OT}	4,125
October 19	1:30 pm	at No. 3 Eastern Illinois	O'Brien Field; Charleston, IL	OVCDN	L 33–55	11,569
October 26	1:00 pm	Eastern Kentucky^{†}	Houck Stadium; Cape Girardeau, MO	ESPN3	L 7–31	5,171
November 2	1:00 pm	Urbana*	Houck Stadium; Cape Girardeau, MO	OVCDN	W 37–35	1,249
November 9	1:00 pm	Tennessee Tech	Houck Stadium; Cape Girardeau, MO	OVCDN	L 16–41	2,206
November 16	1:00 pm	at Austin Peay	Governors Stadium; Clarksville, TN	OVCDN	W 36–34	4,267
November 23	3:00 pm	at Jacksonville State	Burgess–Snow Field at JSU Stadium; Jacksonville, AL	OVCDN	L 34–42	12,927
*Non-conference game; ^{†}Homecoming; Rankings from The Sports Network Poll released prior to the game; All times are in Central time
