= 2013 Eastern Illinois Panthers football team =

American college football season

2013 Eastern Illinois Panthers football
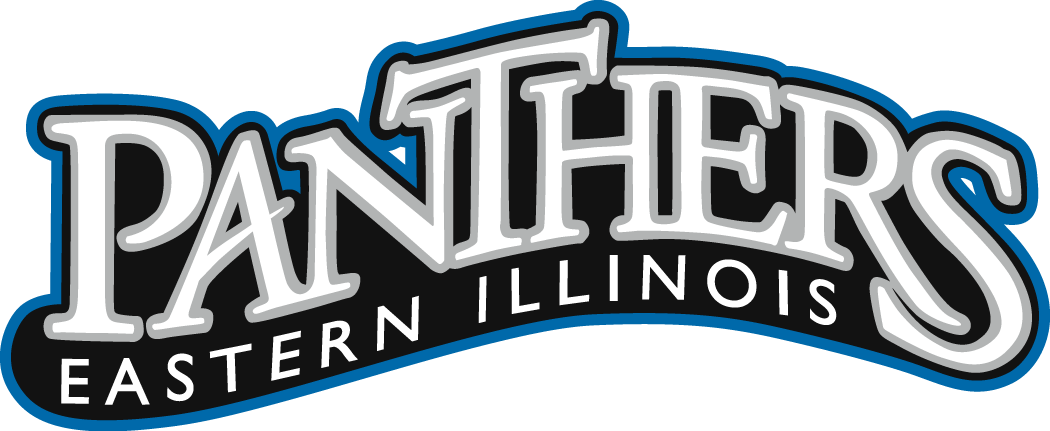

OVC champion

NCAA Division I Quarterfinal, L 39–49 vs. Towson
- Conference: Ohio Valley Conference

Ranking
- Sports Network: No. 4
- FCS Coaches: No. 4
- Record: 12–2 (8–0 OVC)
- Head coach: Dino Babers (2nd season)
- Offensive coordinator: Sterlin Gilbert (2nd season)
- Offensive scheme: Veer and shoot
- Defensive coordinator: Kim McCloud (2nd season)
- Base defense: 4–3
- Home stadium: O'Brien Field

2013 Ohio Valley Conference football standings
| | Conf. | | | Overall |
| Team | W | | L | W | | L |
|---|---|---|---|---|---|---|
| No. 4 Eastern Illinois $^ | 8 | – | 0 | 12 | – | 2 |
| No. 17 Tennessee State ^ | 6 | – | 2 | 10 | – | 4 |
| No. 10 Jacksonville State ^ | 5 | – | 3 | 11 | – | 4 |
| UT Martin | 5 | – | 3 | 7 | – | 5 |
| Eastern Kentucky | 4 | – | 4 | 6 | – | 6 |
| Murray State | 4 | – | 4 | 6 | – | 6 |
| Tennessee Tech | 2 | – | 6 | 5 | – | 7 |
| Southeast Missouri State | 2 | – | 6 | 3 | – | 9 |
| Austin Peay | 0 | – | 8 | 0 | – | 12 |
$ – Conference champion; ^ – FCS playoff participant; Rankings from The Sports Network poll

The 2013 Eastern Illinois Panthers football team represented Eastern Illinois University as a member of the Ohio Valley Conference (OVC) during the 2013 NCAA Division I FCS football season. Led by Dino Babers in his second and final season as head coach, the Panthers compiled an overall record of 12–2 overall with a mark of 8–0 in conference play, winning the OVC title for the second consecutive season. Eastern Illinois earned the conference's automatic bid into the NCAA Division I Football Championship playoffs, where the Panthers defeated Tennessee State in the second round before losing to Towson in the quarterfinals. The team played home games at O'Brien Field in Charleston, Illinois.

On December 18, Babers resigned to become the head football coach at Bowling Green State University.

== Schedule ==
| Date | Time | Opponent | Rank | Site | TV | Result | Attendance |
|---|---|---|---|---|---|---|---|
| August 31 | 7:00 pm | at San Diego State* | No. 21 | Qualcomm Stadium; San Diego, CA | MWN | W 40–19 | 42,978 |
| September 7 | 6:00 pm | at Southern Illinois* | No. 14 | Saluki Stadium; Carbondale, IL | | W 40–37 ^{2OT} | 10,038 |
| September 14 | 6:00 pm | No. 18 Illinois State* | No. 9 | O'Brien Field; Charleston, IL (Mid-America Classic) | WEIU | W 57–24 | 10,741 |
| September 21 | 7:00 pm | at Northern Illinois* | No. 8 | Huskie Stadium; DeKalb, IL | ESPN3 | L 39–43 | 23,595 |
| September 28 | 1:30 pm | Eastern Kentucky | No. 8 | O'Brien Field; Charleston, IL | ESPN3 | W 42–7 | 11,469 |
| October 12 | 6:00 pm | at Austin Peay | No. 5 | Governors Stadium; Clarksville, TN | OVCDN | W 63–7 | 5,501 |
| October 19 | 1:30 pm | Southeast Missouri State^{†} | No. 3 | O'Brien Field; Charleston, IL | WEIU | W 55–33 | 11,569 |
| October 26 | 4:00 pm | at No. 21 Tennessee State | No. 2 | LP Field; Nashville, TN | OVCDN | W 34–16 | 22,157 |
| November 2 | 12:00 pm | Tennessee Tech | No. 2 | O'Brien Field; Charleston, IL | WEIU | W 56–21 | 6,939 |
| November 9 | 12:00 pm | at Murray State | No. 2 | Roy Stewart Stadium; Murray, KY | OVCDN | W 37–17 | 3,119 |
| November 16 | 12:00 pm | No. 22 Jacksonville State | No. 2 | O'Brien Field; Charleston, IL | ESPN3 | W 52–14 | 6,693 |
| November 23 | 1:00 pm | at UT Martin | No. 2 | Graham Stadium; Martin, TN | ESPN3 | W 70–22 | 3,167 |
| December 7 | 1:00 pm | No. 19 Tennessee State* | No. 2 | O'Brien Field; Charleston, IL (NCAA Division I Second Round) | ESPN3 | W 51–10 | 4,825 |
| December 13 | 7:00 pm | No. 5 Towson* | No. 2 | O'Brien Field; Charleston, IL (NCAA Division I Quarterfinal) | ESPN2 | L 39–49 | 3,850 |
*Non-conference game; ^{†}Homecoming; Rankings from The Sports Network Poll released prior to the game; All times are in Central time

== Game summaries ==
=== San Diego State ===
| Team | 1 | 2 | 3 | 4 | Total |
|---|---|---|---|---|---|
| • #21 (FCS) Panthers | 7 | 12 | 7 | 14 | 40 |
| Aztecs | 13 | 3 | 3 | 0 | 19 |

- Date: August 31
- Location: Qualcomm Stadium
  San Diego, CA
- Game start: 7:00 PM CST
- Game attendance: 42,978

Scoring summary
| 1 | 12:57 | SDSU | 41-yard field goal by Wes Feer | SDSU 3–0 |
| 1 | 11:14 | EIU | Erik Lora 37-yard touchdown reception from Jimmy Garoppolo, Cameron Berra kick good | EIU 7–3 |
| 1 | 9:11 | SDSU | Colin Lockett 48-yard touchdown run, Feer kick good | SDSU 10–7 |
| 1 | 4:25 | SDSU | 35-yard field goal by Feer | SDSU 13–7 |
| 2 | 13:43 | EIU | Lora 4-yard touchdown reception from Garoppolo, Berra kick no good | Tied 13–13 |
| 2 | 3:22 | EIU | Keiondre Gober 62-yard touchdown reception from Garoppolo, Berra kick blocked | EIU 19–13 |
| 2 | :16 | SDSU | 22-yard field goal by Feer | EIU 19–16 |
| 3 | 10:57 | SDSU | 38-yard field goal by Feer | Tied 19–19 |
| 3 | 7:36 | EIU | Taylor Duncan 2-yard touchdown run, Berra kick good | EIU 26–19 |
| 4 | 13:43 | EIU | Punt returned 60 yards for touchdown by Shephard Little, Berra kick good | EIU 33–19 |
| 4 | 4:30 | EIU | Duncan 45-yard touchdown run, Berra kick good | EIU 40–19 |

== Ranking movements ==
Ranking movements Legend: ██ Increase in ranking ██ Decrease in ranking
| | Week | | | | | | | | | | | | | | |
| Poll | Pre | 1 | 2 | 3 | 4 | 5 | 6 | 7 | 8 | 9 | 10 | 11 | 12 | 13 | Final |
|---|---|---|---|---|---|---|---|---|---|---|---|---|---|---|---|
| Sports Network | 21 | 14 | 9 | 8 | 8 | 5 | 5 | 3 | 2 | 2 | 2 | 2 | 2 | 2 | 4 |
| Coaches | 23 | 16 | 12 | 10 | 12 | 5 | 4 | 3 | 2 | 2 | 2 | 2 | 2 | 2 | 4 |
