= 2013 Jacksonville State Gamecocks football team =

American college football season

2013 Jacksonville State Gamecocks football

NCAA Division I Quarterfinal, L 24–35 at Eastern Washington
- Conference: Ohio Valley Conference

Ranking
- Sports Network: No. 10
- FCS Coaches: No. 12
- Record: 11–4 (5–3 OVC)
- Head coach: Bill Clark (1st season)
- Offensive coordinator: John Grass (1st season)
- Defensive coordinator: Duwan Walker (1st season)
- Home stadium: Burgess–Snow Field at JSU Stadium

2013 Ohio Valley Conference football standings
	Conf.			Overall
Team	W		L	W		L
No. 4 Eastern Illinois $^	8	–	0	12	–	2
No. 17 Tennessee State ^	6	–	2	10	–	4
No. 10 Jacksonville State ^	5	–	3	11	–	4
UT Martin	5	–	3	7	–	5
Eastern Kentucky	4	–	4	6	–	6
Murray State	4	–	4	6	–	6
Tennessee Tech	2	–	6	5	–	7
Southeast Missouri State	2	–	6	3	–	9
Austin Peay	0	–	8	0	–	12
$ – Conference champion; ^ – FCS playoff participant; Rankings from The Sports Network poll

The 2013 Jacksonville State Gamecocks football team represented Jacksonville State University as a member of the Ohio Valley Conference (OVC) during the 2013 NCAA Division I FCS football season. Led by Bill Clark his first and only season as head coach, the Gamecocks compiled an overall record of 11–4 with a mark of 5–3 in conference play, tying for third place in the OVC. Jacksonville State received an at-large bid to NCAA Division I Football Championship playoffs, defeating Samford in the first round and McNeese State in the second round before losing to Eastern Washington in the quarterfinals. The team played home games at Burgess–Snow Field at JSU Stadium in Jacksonville, Alabama.

On January 21, 2014, Clark resigned to become the head football coach at the University of Alabama at Birmingham (UAB).

== Schedule ==
Date	Time	Opponent	Rank	Site	TV	Result	Attendance
August 31	5:00 pm	at Alabama State*		Cramton Bowl; Montgomery, AL	CSS	W 24–22	1,580
September 7	6:00 pm	Jacksonville*		Burgess–Snow Field at JSU Stadium; Jacksonville, AL	WJXS	W 48–13	17,592
September 14	7:00 pm	North Alabama*		JSU Stadium; Jacksonville, AL	WJXS	W 24–21 ^{2OT}	20,843
September 21	1:00 pm	at Georgia State*		Georgia Dome; Atlanta, GA	ESPN3	W 32–26 ^{OT}	15,425
September 28	3:00 pm	Murray State		JSU Stadium; Jacksonville, AL	WJXS	L 34–35 ^{OT}	14,382
October 5	3:00 pm	at No. 22 UT Martin		Graham Stadium; Martin, TN	ESPN3	W 41–27	4,981
October 12	3:00 pm	Tennessee State^{†}	No. 24	Burgess–Snow Field at JSU Stadium; Jacksonville, AL	WJXS	L 15–31	19,092
October 26	1:30 pm	at Tennessee Tech		Tucker Stadium; Cookeville, TN	OVCDN	W 34–14	8,953
November 2	1:00 pm	at Austin Peay		Governors Stadium; Clarksville, TN	OVCDN	W 42–10	4,010
November 9	3:00 pm	Eastern Kentucky		Burgess–Snow Field at JSU Stadium; Jacksonville, AL	WJXS	W 68–10	16,876
November 16	1:00 pm	at No. 2 Eastern Illinois	No. 22	O'Brien Stadium; Charleston, IL	ESPN3	L 14–52	6,693
November 23	3:00 pm	Southeast Missouri State		Burgess–Snow Field at JSU Stadium; Jacksonville, AL	WJXS	W 42–34	12,927
November 30	7:00 pm	No. 18 Samford*	No. 20	Burgess–Snow Field at JSU Stadium; Jacksonville, AL (NCAA Division I First Round)	ESPN3	W 55–14	8,992
December 7	6:00 pm	at No. 6 McNeese State*	No. 20	Cowboy Stadium; Lake Charles, LA (NCAA Division I Second Round)	ESPN3	W 31–10	5,036
December 14	3:00 pm	at No. 3 Eastern Washington*	No. 20	Roos Field; Cheney, WA (NCAA Division I Quarterfinal)	ESPN3	L 24–35	4,277
*Non-conference game; ^{†}Homecoming; Rankings from The Sports Network Poll released prior to the game; All times are in Central time

== Game summaries ==
=== @ Alabama State ===
Jacksonville State @ Alabama State

Team	1	2	3	4	Total
• Gamecocks	0	0	24	0	24
Hornets	0	6	3	13	22

- Date: August 31
- Location: Cramton Bowl
  Montgomery, AL
- Game start: 5:00 PM CDT
- Game attendance: 1,580
- Television network: CSS

=== Jacksonville ===
Jacksonville @ Jacksonville State

Team	1	2	3	4	Total
Dolphins	7	3	0	3	13
• Gamecocks	0	21	24	3	48

- Date: September 7
- Location: JSU Stadium
  Jacksonville, AL
- Game start: 6:00 PM CDT
- Game attendance: 17,592
- Television network: WJXS

=== North Alabama ===
North Alabama @ Jacksonville State

Team	1	2	3	4	OT	2OT	Total
Lions	0	2	3	13	3	0	21
• Gamecocks	10	3	0	5	3	3	24

- Date: September 14
- Location: JSU Stadium
  Jacksonville, AL
- Game start: 7:00 PM CDT
- Game attendance: 20,843
- Television network: WJXS

=== @ Georgia State ===
Jacksonville State @ Georgia State

Team	1	2	3	4	OT	Total
• Gamecocks	7	13	3	3	6	32
Panthers	9	0	0	17	0	26

- Date: September 21
- Location: Georgia Dome
  Atlanta, GA
- Game start: 1:00 PM CDT
- Game attendance: 15,425
- Television network: ESPN3

=== Murray State ===
Murray State @ Jacksonville State

Team	1	2	3	4	OT	Total
• Racers	10	10	0	7	8	35
Gamecocks	0	10	14	3	7	34

- Date: September 28
- Location: JSU Stadium
  Jacksonville, AL
- Game start: 3:00 PM CDT
- Television network: WJXS

=== @ UT Martin ===
Jacksonville State @ UT Martin

Team	1	2	3	4	Total
• Gamecocks	10	14	3	14	41
#22 Skyhawks	7	3	10	7	27

- Date: October 5
- Location: Graham Stadium
  Martin, TN
- Game start: 3:00 PM CDT
- Television network: ESPN3

=== Tennessee State ===
Tennessee State @ Jacksonville State

Team	1	2	3	4	Total
• Tigers	7	14	0	10	31
#24 Gamecocks	6	0	7	2	15

- Date: October 12
- Location: JSU Stadium
  Jacksonville, AL
- Game start: 3:00 PM CDT
- Television network: WJXS

=== @ Tennessee Tech ===
Jacksonville State @ Tennessee Tech

Team	1	2	3	4	Total
• Gamecocks	7	17	3	7	34
Golden Eagles	0	7	0	7	14

- Date: October 26
- Location: Tucker Stadium
  Cookeville, TN
- Game start: 1:30 PM CDT
- Television network: OVCDN

=== @ Austin Peay ===
Jacksonville State @ Austin Peay

Team	1	2	3	4	Total
• Gamecocks	7	21	14	0	42
Governors	0	3	7	0	10

- Date: November 2
- Location: Governors Stadium
  Clarksville, TN
- Game start: 1:00 PM CDT
- Television network: OVCDN

=== Eastern Kentucky ===
Eastern Kentucky @ Jacksonville State

Team	1	2	3	4	Total
Colonels	3	0	7	0	10
• Gamecocks	16	24	14	14	68

- Date: November 9
- Location: JSU Stadium
  Jacksonville, AL
- Game start: 3:00 PM CST
- Television network: WJXS

=== @ Eastern Illinois ===
Jacksonville State @ Eastern Illinois

Team	1	2	3	4	Total
#22 Gamecocks	0	7	0	7	14
• #2 Panthers	35	3	7	7	52

- Date: November 16
- Location: O'Brien Stadium
  Charleston, IL
- Game start: 1:00 PM CST
- Television network: ESPN3

=== Southeast Missouri State ===
Southeast Missouri State @ Jacksonville State

Team	1	2	3	4	Total
Redhawks	6	0	7	21	34
• Gamecocks	21	7	14	0	42

- Date: November 24
- Location: JSU Stadium
  Jacksonville, AL
- Game start: 3:00 PM CST
- Television network: WJXS

=== Samford ===
Samford @ Jacksonville State

Team	1	2	3	4	Total
#18 Bulldogs	0	0	7	7	14
• #20 Gamecocks	17	21	10	7	55

- Date: November 24
- Location: JSU Stadium
  Jacksonville, AL
- Game start: 7:00 PM CST
- Television network: ESPN3

=== McNeese State ===
Jacksonville State @ McNeese State

Team	1	2	3	4	Total
• #20 Gamecocks	7	14	3	7	31
#6 Cowboys	0	0	3	7	10

- Date: December 7
- Location: Cowboy Stadium
  Lake Charles, LA
- Game start: 6:00 PM CST
- Television network: ESPN3

== Ranking movements ==
Ranking movements Legend: ██ Increase in ranking ██ Decrease in ranking RV = Received votes
	Week														
Poll	Pre	1	2	3	4	5	6	7	8	9	10	11	12	13	Final
Sports Network	RV	RV	RV	RV	RV	RV	24	RV	RV	RV	RV	22	RV	20	10
Coaches	RV	RV	RV	RV	RV	RV	24	RV	RV	RV	RV	23	RV	21	12
