= 2013 Murray State Racers football team =

American college football season

2013 Murray State Racers football
- Conference: Ohio Valley Conference
- Record: 6–6 (4–4 OVC)
- Head coach: Chris Hatcher (4th season)
- Offensive coordinator: Mitch Stewart (3rd season)
- Offensive scheme: Air raid
- Defensive coordinator: Dennis Therrell (3rd season)
- Base defense: 4–3
- Home stadium: Roy Stewart Stadium

2013 Ohio Valley Conference football standings
	Conf.			Overall
Team	W		L	W		L
No. 4 Eastern Illinois $^	8	–	0	12	–	2
No. 17 Tennessee State ^	6	–	2	10	–	4
No. 10 Jacksonville State ^	5	–	3	11	–	4
UT Martin	5	–	3	7	–	5
Eastern Kentucky	4	–	4	6	–	6
Murray State	4	–	4	6	–	6
Tennessee Tech	2	–	6	5	–	7
Southeast Missouri State	2	–	6	3	–	9
Austin Peay	0	–	8	0	–	12
$ – Conference champion; ^ – FCS playoff participant; Rankings from The Sports Network poll

The 2013 Murray State Racers football team represented Murray State University in the 2013 NCAA Division I FCS football season. They were led by fourth-year head coach Chris Hatcher and played their home games at Roy Stewart Stadium. They were a member of the Ohio Valley Conference. They finished the season 6–6, 4–4 in OVC play to finish in a tie for fifth place.

== Schedule ==
Date	Time	Opponent	Site	TV	Result	Attendance
August 31	6:00 pm	at Missouri*	Faurot Field; Columbia, MO	PPV	L 14–58	58,038
September 7	6:00 pm	Campbellsville*	Roy Stewart Stadium; Murray, KY	OVCDN	W 83–14	5,350
September 14	6:00 pm	Missouri State*	Roy Stewart Stadium; Murray, KY	OVCDN	W 41–38	10,132
September 21	3:30 pm	at Bowling Green*	Doyt Perry Stadium; Bowling Green, OH	BCSN/ESPN3	L 7–48	16,094
September 28	3:00 pm	at Jacksonville State	JSU Stadium; Jacksonville, AL	OVCDN	W 35–34 ^{OT}	14,382
October 5	3:00 pm	Tennessee Tech	Roy Stewart Stadium; Murray, KY	OVCDN	W 35–24	4,922
October 12	1:00 pm	at Southeast Missouri State	Houck Stadium; Cape Girardeau, MO	RTVN/ESPN3	L 34–37 ^{3OT}	4,125
October 19	3:00 pm	Austin Peay^{†}	Roy Stewart Stadium; Murray, KY	ESPN3	W 31–3	6,847
November 2	1:00 pm	at UT Martin	Graham Stadium; Martin, TN	RTVN	L 17–45	4,817
November 9	12:00 pm	No. 2 Eastern Illinois	Roy Stewart Stadium; Murray, KY	OVCDN	L 17–37	3,119
November 16	2:00 pm	at Tennessee State	LP Field; Nashville, TN	OVCDN	L 10–17	6,412
November 23	12:00 pm	Eastern Kentucky	Roy Stewart Stadium; Murray, KY	OVCDN	W 34–27 ^{OT}	2,299
*Non-conference game; ^{†}Homecoming; Rankings from The Sports Network Poll released prior to the game; All times are in Central time

- Source: Schedule
