= 2013 Tennessee State Tigers football team =

American college football season

2013 Tennessee State Tigers football

Black college national champion

NCAA Division I Second Round, L 10–51 vs. Eastern Illinois
- Conference: Ohio Valley Conference

Ranking
- Sports Network: No. 17
- FCS Coaches: No. 17
- Record: 10–4 (6–2 OVC)
- Head coach: Rod Reed (4th season)
- Offensive coordinator: Mike Jones (4th season)
- Co-defensive coordinators: Osita Alaribe (3rd season); Justin Roberts (3rd season)
- Home stadium: LP Field; Hale Stadium

2013 Ohio Valley Conference football standings
	Conf.			Overall
Team	W		L	W		L
No. 4 Eastern Illinois $^	8	–	0	12	–	2
No. 17 Tennessee State ^	6	–	2	10	–	4
No. 10 Jacksonville State ^	5	–	3	11	–	4
UT Martin	5	–	3	7	–	5
Eastern Kentucky	4	–	4	6	–	6
Murray State	4	–	4	6	–	6
Tennessee Tech	2	–	6	5	–	7
Southeast Missouri State	2	–	6	3	–	9
Austin Peay	0	–	8	0	–	12
$ – Conference champion; ^ – FCS playoff participant; Rankings from The Sports Network poll

The 2013 Tennessee State Tigers football team represented Tennessee State University as a member of the Ohio Valley Conference (OVC) in the 2013 NCAA Division I FCS football season. They were led by fourth-year head coach Rod Reed and played their home games at LP Field and at Hale Stadium. Tennessee State finished the season 10–4 overall and 6–2 in OVC play to place second. They received an at-large bid to the NCAA Division I Football Championship playoffs, where they defeated Butler in the first round before losing to Eastern Illinois in the second round.

== Schedule ==
Date	Time	Opponent	Rank	Site	TV	Result	Attendance
September 1	7:00 pm	No. 23 Bethune–Cookman*		LP Field; Nashville, TN (John Merritt Classic)	ESPN3	L 9–12	16,108
September 7	2:00 pm	at Florida A&M*		Bragg Memorial Stadium; Tallahassee, FL		W 27–7	14,237
September 14	6:00 pm	vs. Jackson State*		Liberty Bowl Memorial Stadium; Memphis, TN (Southern Heritage Classic)	FSSO	W 26–16	42,400
September 21	7:00 pm	at Tennessee Tech		Tucker Stadium; Cookeville, TN (Sgt. York Trophy)	ESPN3	W 41–21	10,044
September 28	2:00 pm	vs. Central State (OH)*		Edward Jones Dome; St. Louis, MO		W 73–6	22,000
October 5	6:00 pm	Southeast Missouri State		LP Field; Nashville, TN	OVCDN	W 40–16	7,374
October 12	3:00 pm	at No. 24 Jacksonville State		JSU Stadium; Jacksonville, AL	OVCDN	W 31–15	19,092
October 19	1:00 pm	at UT Martin	No. 24	Graham Stadium; Martin, TN	OVCDN	W 29–15	4,166
October 26	4:00 pm	No. 3 Eastern Illinois^{†}	No. 21	LP Field; Nashville, TN	OVCDN	L 16–34	22,157
November 2	1:00 pm	at Eastern Kentucky	No. 23	Roy Kidd Stadium; Richmond, KY	ESPN3	L 0–44	5,700
November 9	2:00 pm	Austin Peay		Hale Stadium; Nashville, TN	OVCDN	W 31–6	5,258
November 16	2:00 pm	Murray State		LP Field; Nashville, TN	OVCDN	W 17–10	6,412
November 30	12:00 pm	at Butler*	No. 19	Butler Bowl; Indianapolis, IN (NCAA Division I First Round)	ESPN3	W 31–0	1,928
December 7	1:00 pm	at No. 2 Eastern Illinois*	No. 19	O'Brien Field; Charleston, IL (NCAA Division I Second Round)	ESPN3	L 10–51	4,825
*Non-conference game; ^{†}Homecoming; Rankings from The Sports Network Poll released prior to the game; All times are in Central time
