= 2021 Sam Houston Bearkats football team =

American college football season

2021 Sam Houston Bearkats football
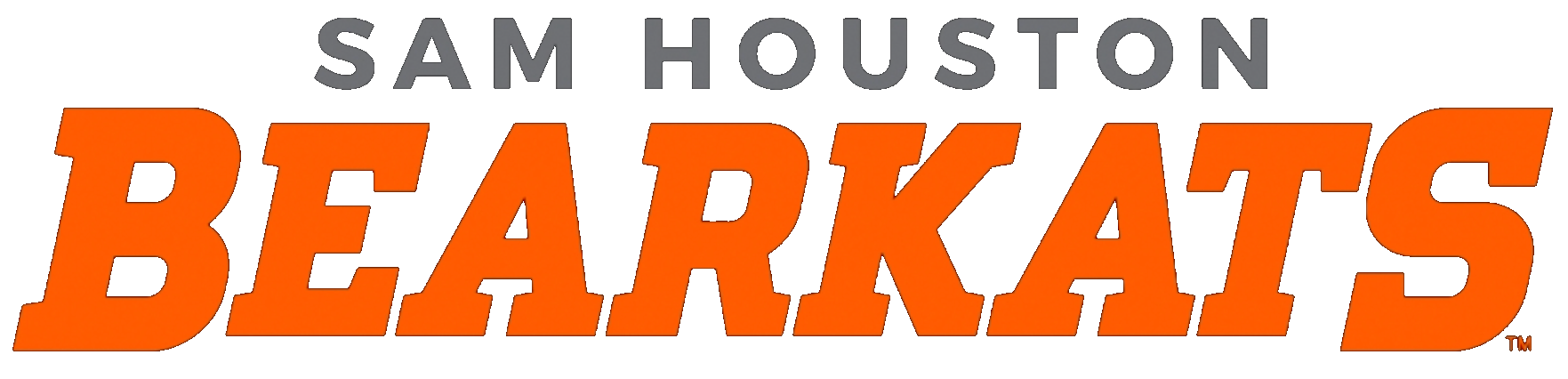

WAC champion WAC–ASUN Challenge champion

NCAA Division I Quarterfinal, L 19–42 vs. Montana State
- Conference: AQ7

Ranking
- STATS: No. 5
- FCS Coaches: No. 4
- Record: 11–1 (6–0 AQ7)
- Head coach: K. C. Keeler (8th season)
- Offensive coordinator: Ryan Carty (4th season)
- Offensive scheme: No-huddle spread option
- Defensive coordinator: Clayton Carlin (5th season)
- Base defense: 4–2–5
- Home stadium: Bowers Stadium

2021 Western Athletic Conference football standings
| | Conf. | | | Overall |
| Team | W | | L | W | | L |
|---|---|---|---|---|---|---|
| No. 5 Sam Houston $^ | 5 | – | 0 | 11 | – | 1 |
| No. 21 Stephen F. Austin ^ | 4 | – | 1 | 8 | – | 4 |
| Abilene Christian | 2 | – | 2 | 5 | – | 6 |
| Tarleton State * | 2 | – | 3 | 6 | – | 5 |
| Dixie State * | 0 | – | 3 | 1 | – | 10 |
| Lamar | 0 | – | 4 | 1 | – | 9 |
$ – Conference champion; ^ – FCS playoff participant; * – Ineligible for FCS playoffs due to transition from Division II; Rankings from STATS Poll

2021 WAC–ASUN Challenge football standings
| | Conf. | | | Overall |
| Team | W | | L | W | | L |
|---|---|---|---|---|---|---|
| No. 5 Sam Houston $^ | 6 | – | 0 | 11 | – | 1 |
| No. 21 Stephen F. Austin ^ | 4 | – | 2 | 8 | – | 4 |
| Eastern Kentucky | 4 | – | 2 | 7 | – | 4 |
| Central Arkansas | 3 | – | 3 | 5 | – | 6 |
| Jacksonville State | 3 | – | 3 | 5 | – | 6 |
| Abilene Christian | 1 | – | 5 | 5 | – | 6 |
| Lamar | 0 | – | 6 | 1 | – | 9 |
$ – Conference champion; ^ – FCS playoff participant; Rankings from STATS Poll

The 2021 Sam Houston Bearkats football team represented Sam Houston State University in the 2021 NCAA Division I FCS football season as a member of the Western Athletic Conference. The Bearkats were led by eighth-year head coach K. C. Keeler and played their home games at Bowers Stadium.

The Western Athletic Conference and ASUN Conference announced the formation of the WAC–ASUN Challenge (AQ7) for the 2021 season on February 23, 2021. The Challenge included the four fully qualified Division I (FCS) members of the WAC (Abilene Christian, Lamar, Sam Houston, and Stephen F. Austin) and Central Arkansas, Eastern Kentucky, and Jacksonville State of the ASUN Conference. The winner of the challenge received an auto-bid to the NCAA Division I FCS football playoffs.

== Preseason ==
=== Preseason polls ===
==== WAC Poll ====
The Western Athletic Conference coaches released their preseason poll on July 27, 2021. The Bearkats were picked to finish first in the conference. In addition, several Bearkats were selected to the preseason WAC Offense, Defense, and Special teams. Eric Schmid was selected preseason offensive player of the year. Jahari Kay was selected defensive player of the year.

| Predicted finish | Team | Votes (1st place) |
|---|---|---|
| 1 | Sam Houston | 20 (5) |
| 2 | Stephen F. Austin | 16 (1) |
| 3 | Tarleton State | 11 |
| 4 | Lamar | 8 |
| 5 | Abilene Christian | 5 |

- Note: Dixie State is not included since they are not playing a full WAC schedule due to previous non-conference game contracts. Dixie State players are eligible for individual rewards.

==== Preseason All–WAC Team ====
Offense

- Eric Schmid – Quarterback, JR
- Ramon Jefferson – Running back, JR
- Ramon Jefferson – Running back, JR
- Jequez Ezzard – Wide receiver, GR
- Isaac Schley – Tight end, GR
- Eleasah Anderson – Offensive lineman, JR
- Prince Pines – Offensive lineman, SO
- Colby Thomas – Offensive lineman, SR

Defense

- Jahari Kay – Defensive lineman, SR
- Trace Mascorro – Defensive lineman, SR
- Joseph Wallace – Defensive lineman, SR
- Quentin Brown – Linebacker, JR
- Trevor Williams – Linebacker, JR
- Zyon McCollum – Defensive back, SR
- Jalen Thomas – Defensive back, SR

Special teams

- Seth Morgan – Kicker, FR
- Matt McRobert – Punter, SR
- Jequez Ezzard – Kick Returner, GR

==== AQ7 Poll ====
The AQ7 coaches also released their preseason poll on July 27, 2021. The Bearkats were picked to finish first in the ASUN-WAC Challenge.

| Predicted finish | Team | Votes (1st place) |
|---|---|---|
| 1 | Sam Houston State | 49 (7) |
| 2 | Central Arkansas | 40 |
| 3 | Jacksonville State | 37 |
| 4 | Stephen F. Austin | 27 |
| 5 | Eastern Kentucky | 20 |
| 6 | Abilene Christian | 15 |
| 7 | Lamar | 8 |

== Roster ==
2021 Sam Houston Bearkats football team roster
Players
Coaches
Offense

| Pos. | # | Name | Class |
|---|---|---|---|
| WR | 2 | Ife Adeyi | So |
| QB | 3 | Eric Schmid | Jr |
| RB | 4 | Ramon Jefferson | Jr |
| QB | 5 | Keegan Shoemaker | So |
| RB | 6 | Noah Smith | So |
| WR | 7 | Brennon Tibbs | Sr |
| RB | 8 | Daryon Triche | Fr |
| WR | 9 | Cody Chrest | GS |
| QB | 10 | Trapper Pannell | Fr |
| QB | 11 | Gunner Capps | Fr |
| WR | 12 | Jequez Ezzard | GS |
| QB | 13 | Tristan Brady | Fr |
| WR | 14 | Ryan Humphries | So |
| WR | 15 | Tony Williams | Jr |
| TE | 16 | Isaac Schley | GS |
| QB | 17 | Matthew Southern | Fr |
| TE | 18 | Jacob Kainer | Jr |
| RB | 21 | Zach Hrbacek | Fr |
| WR | 22 | Jaxson Chrest | Fr |
| WR | 23 | Adrian Murdaugh | Fr |
| RB | 26 | Kyran Jackson | Sr |
| TE | 27 | Dalton Meyer | So |
| RB | 28 | Charles Crawford III | Fr |
| RB | 29 | Jacob Berry | Jr |
| RB | 32 | Weston Stephens | Fr |
| WR | 36 | Wyatt Huffman | So |
| TE | 44 | Braeden Howell | Fr |
| OL | 50 | Reece Jordan | GS |
| OL | 51 | Jalen North | Fr |
| OL | 52 | Colby Thomas | Sr |
| OL | 56 | Daniel Melendez | Jr |
| OL | 57 | Ethan Hagler | So |
| OL | 59 | Will Jones | Fr |
| OL | 60 | Seth Kohlscheen | Fr |
| OL | 61 | Noah Barboza | So |
| OL | 62 | Anthony Turrubiartes | Jr |
| OL | 64 | Ben Bankston | Jr |
| OL | 65 | Ylijaah Hall | So |
| OL | 70 | Ryder Wall | Fr |
| OL | 73 | Moses Johnson | Jr |
| OL | 74 | Trevor Jaks | Fr |
| OL | 75 | Eleasah Anderson | Jr |
| OL | 76 | Prince Pines | So |
| OL | 77 | Peyton Fifield | So |
| OL | 78 | CJ Marsh | Fr |
| OL | 79 | D'Ary Patton | Fr |
| WR | 80 | Shane Johnson | Fr |
| WR | 81 | Derrick Rose | Fr |
| WR | 82 | Michael Murray | Fr |
| WR | 83 | Red Jones | So |
| WR | 84 | Xavier McGriff | Fr |
| TE | 85 | Rowdy Godwin | Fr |
| TE | 86 | Jarvis Brooks | Sr |
| WR | 87 | KeSean Raven | Fr |
| WR | 88 | Chandler Harvin | So |
| TE | 89 | Marcus Collins | Fr |

Defense

| Pos. | # | Name | Class |
|---|---|---|---|
| DB | 0 | Taylen Blaylock | Fr |
| LB | 1 | Trevor Williams | Jr |
| DB | 2 | Kameryn Alexander | So |
| DB | 3 | Trey Smith | Jr |
| DB | 4 | Braiden Clopton | Fr |
| DB | 5 | Darrel Hawkins-Williams | So |
| LB | 6 | Trey Fields | Fr |
| LB | 7 | Ysidro Mascorro | Fr |
| LB | 8 | Quentin Brown | Jr |
| DB | 9 | Jaylen Thomas | Sr |
| LB | 10 | Jaylen Phillips | Fr |
| DB | 13 | Isaiah Downes | Jr |
| DB | 17 | Ke'Shon Murray | Jr |
| DB | 19 | Emon Allen | Fr |
| DB | 20 | David Fisher | Fr |
| DB | 21 | Nick Chrest | Fr |
| DB | 22 | Zyon McCollum | Sr |
| DB | 23 | Tristin McCollum | Sr |
| DB | 24 | Tobias Weaver | Fr |
| DB | 25 | Daniel North | Fr |
| DB | 26 | RJ Bendert | Fr |
| DB | 27 | Savien Arnett | Fr |
| LB | 28 | Rance McInnis | Fr |
| LB | 29 | Danzell Sims | Sr |
| DB | 30 | Donovan Adkins | Fr |
| DB | 31 | Immanuel Sutton | So |
| LB | 33 | Markel Perry | Jr |
| DB | 34 | Emmonte Davis | Fr |
| LB | 35 | Tim Hart | Sr |
| DB | 36 | Truman Bexley | Fr |
| DB | 37 | Christian Williams | Fr |
| DB | 38 | Jevin Murray | Fr |
| DB | 39 | Caleb Weaver | Fr |
| DB | 40 | Carson Horner | Fr |
| DB | 41 | Kobe Sterling | Fr |
| DB | 42 | Kavian Gaither | Fr |
| DL | 44 | Juan Henry | So |
| DB | 45 | Quan Williams | Fr |
| DB | 46 | Jalan Mayes | So |
| DL | 48 | Goodness Nwawuihe | Fr |
| DL | 49 | Matthew Aribisala | Fr |
| LB | 50 | Darien Flynn | Fr |
| LB | 51 | Trey Mappe | Fr |
| DL | 52 | Luke Horne | Fr |
| LB | 54 | Nick Abengowe | Fr |
| DL | 55 | Jahari Kay | Sr |
| DL | 56 | Cameron Plummer | Fr |
| DL | 58 | LJ Salazar | So |
| DL | 59 | Briceon Hayes | Fr |
| DL | 63 | Roscoe Jones | So |
| DL | 90 | Trace Mascorro | Sr |
| DL | 91 | Maize Washington | Fr |
| DL | 92 | Scean Mustin | Sr |
| DL | 93 | Richard Outland Jr. | Fr |
| DL | 94 | Jevon Leon | So |
| DL | 95 | Joseph Wallace | Sr |
| DL | 96 | Zach Loane | Jr |
| DL | 97 | Chris Scott | So |
| DL | 98 | John Mathis | Fr |
| DL | 99 | Kamren Washington | Fr |

Special teams

| Pos. | # | Name | Class |
|---|---|---|---|
| K | 1 | Seth Morgan | Fr |
| P | 37 | Cameron Hearn | Sr |
| K | 39 | Reed Honshtein | Fr |
| LS | 41 | Noah Caldwell | Jr |
| K, P | 43 | Jadon Cardell | Fr |
| LS | 45 | Zach Stricker | Fr |
| P | 47 | Matt McRobert | Sr |
| K, P | 49 | Christian Pavon | Fr |
| LS | 53 | Tanner Boston | So |

Head coach

- K. C. Keeler

Coordinators/assistant coaches

- Clayton Carlin – Defensive coordinator/safeties
- Ryan Carty – Offensive coordinator/quarterbacks
- Terence Archer – Passing game coordinator/wide receivers
- Gary McGraw – Cornerbacks/special teams coordinator/defensive pass game coordinator
- Chris Buckner – Running backs/offensive recruiting coordinator/NFL liaison
- Jared Hensley – Linebackers
- Matt Merkens – Tight ends
- Joe Morris – Defensive line
- Michael O'Guin – Defensive tackles/defensive recruiting coordinator
- Chris Rogers – Offensive line
- Clayton Barnes – Director of football operations & player personnel
- Ragan Henderson – Athletic equipment coordinator/assistant director of football operations
- Zach Milliet – Special teams analyst
- Mike Singletary – Offensive volunteer/high school relations
- Garrett Smith – Offensive quality control
- Michael Crow – Defensive quality control/assistant defensive recruiting coordinator
- Chandler Arbizzani – Video coordinator

Legend

- (C) Team captain
- (S) Suspended
- (I) Ineligible
- Injured
- Redshirt

Roster
Last update: July 16, 2021

== Schedule ==
| Date | Time | Opponent | Rank | Site | TV | Result | Attendance |
|---|---|---|---|---|---|---|---|
| September 2 | 8:00 p.m. | at Northern Arizona* | No. 1 | Walkup Skydome; Flagstaff, AZ | ESPN+ | W 42–16 | 8,564 |
| September 11 | 6:00 p.m. | Southeast Missouri State* | No. 1 | Bowers Stadium; Huntsville, TX | ESPN+ | W 52–14 | 7,728 |
| September 25 | 4:00 p.m. | at No. 25 Central Arkansas | No. 1 | Estes Stadium; Conway, AR (WAC/ASUN Challenge) | ESPN+ | W 45–35 | 9,475 |
| October 2 | 4:00 p.m. | vs. Stephen F. Austin | No. 1 | NRG Stadium; Houston, TX (Battle of the Piney Woods) | ESPN+ | W 21–20 | 25,007 |
| October 9 | 2:00 p.m. | Lamar | No. 1 | Bowers Stadium; Huntsville, TX | ESPN+ | W 41–7 | 9,836 |
| October 23 | 2:00 p.m. | Jacksonville State | No. 1 | Bowers Stadium; Huntsville, TX (WAC/ASUN Challenge) | ESPN+ | W 42–7 | 7,559 |
| October 30 | 6:00 p.m. | at Tarleton State | No. 1 | Memorial Stadium; Stephenville, TX | ESPN+ | W 45–27 | 8,245 |
| November 6 | 12:00 p.m. | Dixie State | No. 1 | Bowers Stadium; Huntsville, TX | ESPN+ | W 59–10 | 5,004 |
| November 13 | 12:00 p.m. | Eastern Kentucky | No. 1 | Bowers Stadium; Huntsville, TX (WAC/ASUN Challenge) | ESPN+ | W 42–28 | 6,570 |
| November 20 | 1:00 p.m. | at Abilene Christian | No. 1 | Wildcat Stadium; Abilene, TX | ESPN+ | W 35–9 | 4,421 |
| December 4 | 2:00 p.m. | No. 13 Incarnate Word* | No. 1 | Bowers Stadium; Huntsville, TX (NCAA Division I Second Round) | ESPN+ | W 49–42 | 6,722 |
| December 11 | 8:30 p.m. | No. 7 Montana State* | No. 1 | Bowers Stadium; Huntsville, TX (NCAA Division I Quarterfinal) | ESPN+ | L 19–42 | 7,565 |
*Non-conference game; Rankings from STATS Poll released prior to the game; All times are in Central time

== Game summaries ==
=== At Northern Arizona ===
| | 1 | 2 | 3 | 4 | Total |
|---|---|---|---|---|---|
| No. 1 Bearkats | 7 | 14 | 14 | 7 | 42 |
| Lumberjacks | 0 | 7 | 9 | 0 | 16 |

| Statistics | SHSU | NAU |
|---|---|---|
| First downs | 24 | 20 |
| Total yards | 562 | 383 |
| Rushing yards | 294 | 91 |
| Passing yards | 268 | 292 |
| Turnovers | 2 | 2 |
| Time of possession | 28:53 | 31:07 |

| Team | Category | Player | Statistics |
|---|---|---|---|
| Sam Houston | Passing | Eric Schmid | 21/37, 268 yards, 3 TD, INT |
| Sam Houston | Rushing | Ramon Jefferson | 11 rushes, 143 yards, TD |
| Sam Houston | Receiving | Cody Chrest | 7 receptions, 106 yards |
| Northern Arizona | Passing | Jeff Widener | 20/34, 275 yards, TD, 2 INT |
| Northern Arizona | Rushing | Jeff Widener | 9 rushes, 33 yards |
| Northern Arizona | Receiving | Stacy Chukwumezie | 6 receptions, 113 yards, TD |

=== Southeast Missouri State ===
| | 1 | 2 | 3 | 4 | Total |
|---|---|---|---|---|---|
| Redhawks | 7 | 7 | 0 | 0 | 14 |
| No. 1 Bearkats | 7 | 24 | 14 | 7 | 52 |

| Statistics | SEMO | SHSU |
|---|---|---|
| First downs | 13 | 26 |
| Total yards | 306 | 561 |
| Rushing yards | 103 | 297 |
| Passing yards | 203 | 264 |
| Turnovers | 1 | 2 |
| Time of possession | 30:14 | 29:46 |

| Team | Category | Player | Statistics |
|---|---|---|---|
| Southeast Missouri State | Passing | C. J. Ogbonna | 13/27, 168 yards, TD, INT |
| Southeast Missouri State | Rushing | Geno Hess | 15 rushes, 42 yards, TD |
| Southeast Missouri State | Receiving | Aaron Alston | 3 receptions, 63 yards, TD |
| Sam Houston | Passing | Eric Schmid | 16/28, 243 yards, 3 TD, INT |
| Sam Houston | Rushing | Ramon Jefferson | 11 rushes, 153 yards, 2 TD |
| Sam Houston | Receiving | Cody Chrest | 6 receptions, 72 yards, TD |

=== At No. 25 Central Arkansas ===
| | 1 | 2 | 3 | 4 | Total |
|---|---|---|---|---|---|
| No. 1 Bearkats | 14 | 17 | 0 | 14 | 45 |
| No. 25 Bears | 7 | 7 | 14 | 7 | 35 |

| Statistics | SHSU | CARK |
|---|---|---|
| First downs | 23 | 19 |
| Total yards | 478 | 326 |
| Rushing yards | 195 | 38 |
| Passing yards | 283 | 288 |
| Turnovers | 1 | 2 |
| Time of possession | 33:08 | 26:52 |

| Team | Category | Player | Statistics |
|---|---|---|---|
| Sam Houston | Passing | Eric Schmid | 19/37, 283 yards, 4 TD |
| Sam Houston | Rushing | Ramon Jefferson | 22 rushes, 104 yards, TD |
| Sam Houston | Receiving | Ife Adeyi | 4 receptions, 80 yards |
| Central Arkansas | Passing | Breylin Smith | 25/41, 288 yards, 4 TD, 2 INT |
| Central Arkansas | Rushing | Darius Hale | 10 rushes, 36 yards, TD |
| Central Arkansas | Receiving | Tyler Hudson | 11 receptions, 181 yards, 2 TD |

=== Vs. Stephen F. Austin ===
| | 1 | 2 | 3 | 4 | Total |
|---|---|---|---|---|---|
| No. 1 Bearkats | 0 | 6 | 0 | 15 | 21 |
| Lumberjacks | 10 | 3 | 7 | 0 | 20 |

| Statistics | SHSU | SFA |
|---|---|---|
| First downs | 17 | 16 |
| Total yards | 289 | 311 |
| Rushing yards | 67 | 96 |
| Passing yards | 222 | 215 |
| Turnovers | 2 | 1 |
| Time of possession | 29:31 | 30:29 |

| Team | Category | Player | Statistics |
|---|---|---|---|
| Sam Houston | Passing | Keegan Shoemaker | 16/29, 222 yards, 2 TD, INT |
| Sam Houston | Rushing | Ramon Jefferson | 19 rushes, 61 yards |
| Sam Houston | Receiving | Jequez Ezzard | 4 receptions, 74 yards, TD |
| Stephen F. Austin | Passing | Trae Self | 17/34, 215 yards, 2 TD, INT |
| Stephen F. Austin | Rushing | Miles Reed | 16 rushes, 47 yards |
| Stephen F. Austin | Receiving | Xavier Gipson | 9 receptions, 100 yards, TD |

=== Lamar ===
| | 1 | 2 | 3 | 4 | Total |
|---|---|---|---|---|---|
| Cardinals | 0 | 7 | 0 | 0 | 7 |
| No. 1 Bearkats | 14 | 6 | 7 | 14 | 41 |

| Statistics | LAM | SHSU |
|---|---|---|
| First downs | 10 | 24 |
| Total yards | 158 | 438 |
| Rushing yards | 23 | 267 |
| Passing yards | 135 | 171 |
| Turnovers | 0 | 1 |
| Time of possession | 31:39 | 28:21 |

| Team | Category | Player | Statistics |
|---|---|---|---|
| Lamar | Passing | Mike Chandler | 11/18, 135 yards |
| Lamar | Rushing | Chaz Ward | 11 rushes, 23 yards |
| Lamar | Receiving | Jeremy Davis | 2 receptions, 52 yards |
| Sam Houston | Passing | Eric Schmid | 13/31, 159 yards, 2 TD |
| Sam Houston | Rushing | Noah Smith | 14 rushes, 120 yards |
| Sam Houston | Receiving | Cody Chrest | 4 receptions, 81 yards |

=== Jacksonville State ===
| | 1 | 2 | 3 | 4 | Total |
|---|---|---|---|---|---|
| Gamecocks | 7 | 0 | 0 | 0 | 7 |
| No. 1 Bearkats | 7 | 14 | 21 | 0 | 42 |

| Statistics | JVST | SHSU |
|---|---|---|
| First downs | 15 | 25 |
| Total yards | 319 | 463 |
| Rushing yards | 123 | 228 |
| Passing yards | 196 | 235 |
| Turnovers | 3 | 1 |
| Time of possession | 28:03 | 31:57 |

| Team | Category | Player | Statistics |
|---|---|---|---|
| Jacksonville State | Passing | Zerrick Cooper | 15/33, 169 yards, INT |
| Jacksonville State | Rushing | Uriah West | 7 rushes, 69 yards |
| Jacksonville State | Receiving | Ahmad Edwards | 3 receptions, 69 yards |
| Sam Houston | Passing | Eric Schmid | 17/30, 227 yards, 2 TD, INT |
| Sam Houston | Rushing | Ramon Jefferson | 14 rushes, 110 yards, 2 TD |
| Sam Houston | Receiving | Ife Adeyi | 3 receptions, 88 yards, TD |

=== At Tarleton State ===
| | 1 | 2 | 3 | 4 | Total |
|---|---|---|---|---|---|
| No. 1 Bearkats | 14 | 14 | 17 | 0 | 45 |
| Texans | 14 | 0 | 0 | 13 | 27 |

| Statistics | SHSU | TAR |
|---|---|---|
| First downs | 30 | 22 |
| Total yards | 575 | 464 |
| Rushing yards | 268 | 61 |
| Passing yards | 307 | 403 |
| Turnovers | 1 | 0 |
| Time of possession | 33:15 | 26:45 |

| Team | Category | Player | Statistics |
|---|---|---|---|
| Sam Houston | Passing | Eric Schmid | 26/38, 307 yards, 5 TD, INT |
| Sam Houston | Rushing | Ramon Jefferson | 23 rushes, 173 yards |
| Sam Houston | Receiving | Cody Chrest | 9 receptions, 148 yards |
| Tarleton State | Passing | Steven Duncan | 25/43, 403 yards, 4 TD |
| Tarleton State | Rushing | Derrel Kelly III | 9 rushes, 19 yards |
| Tarleton State | Receiving | Tariq Bitson | 7 receptions, 130 yards, 2 TD |

=== Dixie State ===
| | 1 | 2 | 3 | 4 | Total |
|---|---|---|---|---|---|
| Trailblazers | 0 | 0 | 3 | 7 | 10 |
| No. 1 Bearkats | 28 | 17 | 7 | 7 | 59 |

| Statistics | DXST | SHSU |
|---|---|---|
| First downs | 18 | 22 |
| Total yards | 298 | 592 |
| Rushing yards | 58 | 403 |
| Passing yards | 240 | 189 |
| Turnovers | 3 | 1 |
| Time of possession | 29:52 | 30:08 |

| Team | Category | Player | Statistics |
|---|---|---|---|
| Dixie State | Passing | Kobe Tracy | 28/48, 240 yards, TD, 2 INT |
| Dixie State | Rushing | Drew Kannely-Robles | 10 rushes, 42 yards |
| Dixie State | Receiving | Michael Moten | 8 receptions, 93 yards |
| Sam Houston | Passing | Eric Schmid | 10/19, 124 yards, TD, INT |
| Sam Houston | Rushing | Weston Stephens | 7 rushes, 90 yards, TD |
| Sam Houston | Receiving | Derrick Rose | 3 receptions, 57 yards |

=== Eastern Kentucky ===
| | 1 | 2 | 3 | 4 | Total |
|---|---|---|---|---|---|
| Colonels | 0 | 0 | 14 | 14 | 28 |
| No. 1 Bearkats | 7 | 14 | 14 | 7 | 42 |

| Statistics | EKU | SHSU |
|---|---|---|
| First downs | 18 | 28 |
| Total yards | 368 | 521 |
| Rushing yards | 30 | 129 |
| Passing yards | 338 | 392 |
| Turnovers | 1 | 0 |
| Time of possession | 29:19 | 30:41 |

| Team | Category | Player | Statistics |
|---|---|---|---|
| Eastern Kentucky | Passing | Parker McKinney | 28/45, 338 yards, 2 TD, INT |
| Eastern Kentucky | Rushing | Kyeaure Magloire | 4 rushes, 10 yards |
| Eastern Kentucky | Receiving | Matt Wilcox Jr. | 9 receptions, 103 yards |
| Sam Houston | Passing | Eric Schmid | 27/44, 392 yards, 3 TD |
| Sam Houston | Rushing | Ramon Jefferson | 15 rushes, 55 yards, 2 TD |
| Sam Houston | Receiving | Ife Adeyi | 7 receptions, 138 yards, TD |

=== At Abilene Christian ===
| | 1 | 2 | 3 | 4 | Total |
|---|---|---|---|---|---|
| No. 1 Bearkats | 14 | 14 | 7 | 0 | 35 |
| Wildcats | 0 | 3 | 6 | 0 | 9 |

| Statistics | SHSU | ACU |
|---|---|---|
| First downs | 21 | 17 |
| Total yards | 424 | 265 |
| Rushing yards | 174 | 91 |
| Passing yards | 250 | 174 |
| Turnovers | 0 | 1 |
| Time of possession | 30:01 | 29:59 |

| Team | Category | Player | Statistics |
|---|---|---|---|
| Sam Houston | Passing | Eric Schmid | 18/32, 244 yards, 3 TD |
| Sam Houston | Rushing | Ramon Jefferson | 14 rushes, 86 yards, TD |
| Sam Houston | Receiving | Jequez Ezzard | 5 receptions, 106 yards |
| Abilene Christian | Passing | Peyton Mansell | 20/35, 130 yards, INT |
| Abilene Christian | Rushing | Davion Johnson | 3 rushes, 36 yards |
| Abilene Christian | Receiving | Anthony Smith | 6 receptions, 49 yards |

=== No. 13 Incarnate Word (NCAA Divisional I Second Round) ===
| | 1 | 2 | 3 | 4 | Total |
|---|---|---|---|---|---|
| No. 13 Cardinals | 7 | 14 | 7 | 14 | 42 |
| No. 1 Bearkats | 10 | 21 | 3 | 15 | 49 |

| Statistics | UIW | SHSU |
|---|---|---|
| First downs | 31 | 30 |
| Total yards | 600 | 556 |
| Rushing yards | 119 | 346 |
| Passing yards | 481 | 210 |
| Turnovers | 0 | 0 |
| Time of possession | 24:28 | 35:32 |

| Team | Category | Player | Statistics |
|---|---|---|---|
| Incarnate Word | Passing | Cam Ward | 39/61, 481 yards, 5 TD |
| Incarnate Word | Rushing | Kevin Brown | 12 rushes, 64 yards |
| Incarnate Word | Receiving | Darion Chafin | 11 receptions, 172 yards, 2 TD |
| Sam Houston | Passing | Eric Schmid | 21/32, 210 yards, TD |
| Sam Houston | Rushing | Ramon Jefferson | 22 rushes, 166 yards, 2 TD |
| Sam Houston | Receiving | Jequez Ezzard | 4 receptions, 60 yards, TD |

=== No. 7 Montana State (NCAA Division I Quarterfinal) ===
| | 1 | 2 | 3 | 4 | Total |
|---|---|---|---|---|---|
| No. 7 Bobcats | 14 | 14 | 7 | 7 | 42 |
| No. 1 Bearkats | 0 | 6 | 6 | 7 | 19 |

| Statistics | MTST | SHSU |
|---|---|---|
| First downs | 14 | 20 |
| Total yards | 359 | 433 |
| Rushing yards | 190 | 79 |
| Passing yards | 169 | 354 |
| Turnovers | 0 | 3 |
| Time of possession | 27:01 | 32:59 |

| Team | Category | Player | Statistics |
|---|---|---|---|
| Montana State | Passing | Tommy Mellott | 6/11, 165 yards, 2 TD |
| Montana State | Rushing | Isaiah Ifanse | 24 rushes, 105 yards, TD |
| Montana State | Receiving | Lance McCutcheon | 2 receptions, 98 yards, TD |
| Sam Houston | Passing | Eric Schmid | 27/39, 354 yards, 2 TD, 3 INT |
| Sam Houston | Rushing | Noah Smith | 6 rushes, 34 yards |
| Sam Houston | Receiving | Ife Adeyi | 9 receptions, 184 yards, 2 TD |

== Players drafted into the NFL ==
| Round | Pick | Player | Position | NFL team |
|---|---|---|---|---|
| 5 | 157 | Zyon McCollum | DB | Tampa Bay Buccaneers |
