= Maxwell Thurmond =

American football coach (born 1978)

Current position
- Title: Special teams coordinator & running backs coach
- Team: Jacksonville State
- Conference: CUSA

Biographical details
- Born: March 1, 1978 (age 48); Sylvester, Georgia, U.S.
- Education: Jacksonville State (2000)

Playing career
- 1996–2000: Jacksonville State
- Position: Cornerback

Coaching career (HC unless noted)
- 2001: Jacksonville State (GA)
- 2002–2003: Jacksonville State (OLB)
- 2004–2005: Jacksonville State (CB)
- 2006–2010: Jacksonville State (OLB)
- 2011–2012: Jacksonville State (ST/WR)
- 2013: Reinhardt (assistant)
- 2014–2015: West Alabama (ST/LB)
- 2016–2017: Austin Peay (ST/LB)
- 2018: Central Arkansas (DC/LB)
- 2019: Charlotte (ST/LB)
- 2020–2021: Jacksonville State (ST/LB)
- 2021: Jacksonville State (interim HC)
- 2022–2024: Tennessee (sr. off. assistant)
- 2025–present: Jacksonville State (ST/RB)

Head coaching record
- Overall: 1–1

Maxwell Thurmond (born March 1, 1978) is an American college football coach. He is the special teams coordinator & running backs coach for Jacksonville State University, a position he has held since 2025. He previously served as interim head football coach at Jacksonville State University after John Grass resigned with two games remaining in their 2021 season. Previous to serving as interim head coach for the Gamecocks, Thurmond served as an assistant coach for Reinhardt, West Alabama, Austin Peay, Central Arkansas, Charlotte, and Jacksonville State.

Thurmond also coached for Tennessee.

== Head coaching record ==
Year	Team	Overall	Conference	Standing	Bowl/playoffs
Jacksonville State Gamecocks (WAC–ASUN Challenge) (2021)
2021	Jacksonville State	1–1 (Note: John Grass served as Jacksonville State's head coach for the first nine games of the 2021 season before resigning. Thurmond was appointed interim head coach for the remainder of the season. The Gamecocks finished the year with an overall record of 5–6 and a mark of 3–3 in conference play.)	1–1	T–4th	
Jacksonville State:		1–1	1–1		
Total:		1–1			
