= Keegan Shoemaker =

American football player (born 2001)

Fishers Freight
- Position: Quarterback
- Roster status: Active

Personal information
- Born: February 26, 2001 (age 25)
- Listed height: 6 ft 3 in (1.91 m)
- Listed weight: 210 lb (95 kg)

Career information
- High school: Prosper (Prosper, Texas)
- College: Lafayette (2019); Sam Houston (2020–2023)
- NFL draft: 2024: undrafted

Career history

Playing
- Fishers Freight (2025–present)

Coaching
- McKinney Boyd HS (TX) (2024) Assistant quarterbacks coach

Keegan Shoemaker (born February 26, 2001) is an American professional indoor football quarterback for the Fishers Freight of the Indoor Football League (IFL). He played college football for the Lafayette Leopards before transferring to Sam Houston Bearkats.

== Early life ==
Shoemaker grew up in Prosper, Texas and attended Prosper High School. He was rated a two-star recruit and committed to play college football at Lafayette College over offers from Abilene Christian, Georgetown and Stephen F. Austin.

== College career ==
=== Lafayette ===
During Shoemaker's true freshman season in 2019, he played 12 games and started 11 of them. He finished the season with 216 out of 360 passing attempts for 2,545 yards, 14 touchdowns and 14 interceptions and he was named the Patriot League Rookie of the Year, the Patriot League Freshman of the Year and earned Hero Sports Freshman All-American Status and was named the team's offensive MVP.

On December 14, 2020, Shoemaker announced that he would be transferring to Sam Houston.

=== Sam Houston ===
Shoemaker sat out for the 2020-21 season due to NCAA transfer regulations. During the 2021 season, he played in eight games and started two of them, finishing the season with 23 out of 42 passing attempts for 294 yards, three touchdowns and an interception. During the Week 4 game against Stephen F. Austin, he led the team by completing 16 out of 29 passing attempts for 222 yards and two touchdowns to a comeback win of 21–20. Because of his performance, he was named as the WAC Offensive Player of the Week. During the 2022 season, he was named as the starting quarterback and played in seven games and started six of them, finishing the season with 95 out of 204 passing attempts for 1,122 yards, six touchdowns and five interceptions. During the 2023 season, he played in and started 11 games, finishing the season with completing 264 out of 419 passing attempts for 2,507 yards, 15 touchdowns and 11 interceptions.

=== College statistics ===
Year	Team	Games		Passing								Rushing			
Year	Team	GP	GS	Cmp	Att	Pct	Yds	Avg	TD	Int	Rtg	Att	Yds	Avg	TD
2019	Lafayette	12	11	216	360	60.0	2,540	7.1	14	14	124.3	141	347	2.46	3
2020	Sam Houston	0	0	0	0	0.0	0	0.0	0	0	0.0	0	0	0.0	0
2021	Sam Houston	8	2	23	42	54.8	294	7.0	3	1	132.4	16	46	2.88	0
2022	Sam Houston	7	6	95	204	46.6	1,122	5.5	6	5	97.6	48	254	5.29	2
2023	Sam Houston	11	10	264	419	63.0	2,507	6.0	15	11	119.8	93	254	2.73	1
Career		38	29	598	1,025	58.3	6,463	6.3	38	31	117.5	298	901	3.0	6

== Professional career ==
Pre-draft measurables
Height	Weight	Arm length	Hand span	40-yard dash	10-yard split	20-yard shuttle	Three-cone drill	Vertical jump	Broad jump
6 ft 1 3/4 in (1.87 m)	201 lb (91 kg)	30 3/4 in (0.78 m)	9 1/2 in (0.24 m)	4.93 s	1.80 s	5.00 s	7.51 s	30.5 in (0.77 m)	9 ft 8 in (2.95 m)
All values from Pro Day

On January 22, 2025, Shoemaker signed to play for the Fishers Freight of the Indoor Football League (IFL).

== Coaching career ==
On July 24, 2024, Shoemaker was hired as an offensive assistant at McKinney Boyd High School in McKinney, Texas.
