= Cory Carr =

American-born Israeli basketball player and coach

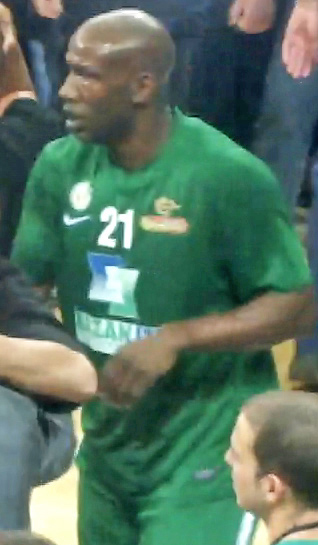

Personal information
- Born: December 5, 1975 (age 50) Fordyce, Arkansas, U.S.
- Listed height: 6 ft 4 in (1.93 m)
- Listed weight: 220 lb (100 kg)

Career information
- High school: Kingsland (Kingsland, Arkansas)
- College: Texas Tech (1994–1998)
- NBA draft: 1998: 2nd round, 49th overall pick
- Drafted by: Atlanta Hawks
- Playing career: 1999–2017
- Position: Small forward
- Number: 21

Career history
- 1999: Chicago Bulls
- 1999: Quad City Thunder
- 1999–2000: New Mexico Slam
- 2000: Pau-Orthez
- 2000–2002: Maccabi Raanana
- 2002: SLUC Nancy
- 2003: Hapoel Galil Elyon
- 2003–2004: Hapoel Haifa
- 2004: Maccabi Giv'at Shmuel
- 2004–2005: Elitzur Ashkelon
- 2005–2006: Ironi Nahariya
- 2006–2007: RB Montecatini Terme
- 2007–2008: Ironi Ashkelon
- 2008–2009: Maccabi Giv'at Shmuel
- 2009–2010: Ironi Ashkelon
- 2010–2011: Apollon Limassol
- 2011: Ironi Ashkelon
- 2011–2012: Hapoel Tel Aviv
- 2012–2013: Maccabi Haifa
- 2013–2014: Ironi Nes Ziona
- 2014–2015: A.S. Ramat HaSharon
- 2015–2016: Elitzur Ramla B.C.
- 2016–2017: Hapoel Acre

Career highlights
- Israeli League champion (2013); 2× First-team All-Big 12 (1997, 1998)
- Stats at NBA.com
- Stats at Basketball Reference

Cory Jermaine Carr (Hebrew: קורי ג'רמיין קאר; born December 5, 1975) is an American-born player development coach for Maccabi Tel Aviv B.C and an Israeli retired basketball player, former NBA and Israeli Basketball Premier League player, head coach of Israeli women's basketball team Israel Girls Basketball Academy. Carr played for the Chicago Bulls and the Texas Tech Red Raiders.

== Biography ==
After a successful high school basketball career in Kingsland, Arkansas, he went on to play at Texas Tech. In 1995–96 he led the Southwest Conference in three-point field goals, with 92. In 1996–97 he led the Big 12 in points per game (23.1). In 1997–98 he led the Big 12 in free throw percentage (.861) and points per game (23.3), and was 1997–98 All-Big 12 – 1st Team. During his college career, he scored 1,904 career points and grabbed 411 rebounds. He also made 262 three-point shots.

After being selected in the second round of the NBA draft in 1998 by the Atlanta Hawks, Carr would play that sole season (the lockout-shortened 1999 season) with the Chicago Bulls, averaging 4 points in 42 appearances.

In 2000, Carr arrived at Israel, beginning a long career in the country. He played in Ironi Nahariya, Elitzur Ashkelon, Maccabi Giv'at Shmuel, Ironi Ashkelon, Hapoel Tel Aviv, Maccabi Haifa B.C. During that period, he has also played overseas in France, Italy and Cyprus.

In the beginning of the 2009/2010 season Carr became an Israeli citizen.

In 2016/2017 he was the coach of the youth team of Maccabi Gedera.

Carr is currently a Player Development Coach For Maccabi Tel Aviv B.C

Carr is the father of current NFL players Tristin McCollum and Zyon McCollum, and he is a cousin of NBA player Cliff Levingston.
