= 2021 Eastern Kentucky Colonels football team =

American college football season

2021 Eastern Kentucky Colonels football

Opportunity Bowl champion
- Conference: AQ7
- Record: 7–4 (4–2 AQ7)
- Head coach: Walt Wells (2nd season)
- Offensive coordinator: Andy Richman (2nd season)
- Defensive coordinator: Jake Johnson (2nd season)
- Home stadium: Roy Kidd Stadium

2021 WAC–ASUN Challenge football standings
	Conf.			Overall
Team	W		L	W		L
No. 5 Sam Houston $^	6	–	0	11	–	1
No. 21 Stephen F. Austin ^	4	–	2	8	–	4
Eastern Kentucky	4	–	2	7	–	4
Central Arkansas	3	–	3	5	–	6
Jacksonville State	3	–	3	5	–	6
Abilene Christian	1	–	5	5	–	6
Lamar	0	–	6	1	–	9
$ – Conference champion; ^ – FCS playoff participant; Rankings from STATS Poll

The 2021 Eastern Kentucky Colonels football team represented Eastern Kentucky University during the 2021 NCAA Division I FCS football season. They were led by Walt Wells in his second season. The Colonels played their home games at Roy Kidd Stadium and competed as a member of the ASUN Conference.

The ASUN Conference and Western Athletic Conference announced the formation of the WAC-ASUN Challenge (AQ7) for the 2021 season on February 23, 2021. The Challenge included the four fully qualified Division I (FCS) members of the WAC (Abilene Christian, Lamar, Sam Houston, and Stephen F. Austin) and Central Arkansas, Eastern Kentucky, and Jacksonville State of the ASUN Conference. The winner of the challenge received an auto-bid to the NCAA Division I FCS football playoffs.

== Schedule ==
Date	Time	Opponent	Rank	Site	TV	Result	Attendance
September 4	6:00 p.m.	at Western Carolina*		Bob Waters Field at E. J. Whitmire Stadium; Cullowhee, NC	ESPN+	W 31–28	9,647
September 11	7:00 pm	at Louisville*		Cardinal Stadium; Louisville, KY	ACCNX	L 3–30	39,673
September 18	7:00 p.m.	Indiana State*		Roy Kidd Stadium; Richmond, KY	ESPN+	L 21–23	14,173
September 25	3:00 p.m.	No. 19 Austin Peay*		Roy Kidd Stadium; Richmond, KY	ESPN+	W 35–27	13,081
October 2	3:00 p.m.	Tarleton State^{†}		Roy Kidd Stadium; Richmond, KY	ESPN+	W 20–3	13,174
October 9	6:00 p.m.	Abilene Christian		Roy Kidd Stadium; Richmond, KY (ASUN/WAC Challenge)	ESPN+	W 30–15	8,659
October 16	5:00 p.m.	at Central Arkansas		Estes Stadium; Conway, AR	ESPN+	W 38–35	5,438
October 30	2:00 p.m.	Lamar	No. 25	Roy Kidd Stadium; Richmond, KY (ASUN/WAC Challenge)	ESPN+	W 42–10	8,462
November 6	5:00 p.m.	at Stephen F. Austin	No. 25	Homer Bryce Stadium; Nacogdoches, TX (ASUN/WAC Challenge)	ESPN+	L 17–31	7,637
November 13	1:00 p.m.	at No. 1 Sam Houston		Bowers Stadium; Huntsville, TX (ASUN/WAC Challenge)	ESPN+	L 28–42	6,570
November 20	2:00 p.m.	Jacksonville State		Roy Kidd Stadium; Richmond, KY (Opportunity Bowl)	ESPN+	W 39–31 ^{2OT}	11,682
*Non-conference game; ^{†}Homecoming; Rankings from STATS Poll released prior to the game; All times are in Eastern time
