= 2021 Central Arkansas Bears football team =

American college football season

2021 Central Arkansas Bears football
- Conference: AQ7
- Record: 5–6 (3–4 AQ7)
- Head coach: Nathan Brown (4th season)
- Offensive coordinator: Ken Collums (4th season)
- Offensive scheme: Spread
- Defensive coordinator: Matt Kitchens (1st season)
- Base defense: 4–3
- Home stadium: Estes Stadium

2021 WAC–ASUN Challenge football standings
	Conf.			Overall
Team	W		L	W		L
No. 5 Sam Houston $^	6	–	0	11	–	1
No. 21 Stephen F. Austin ^	4	–	2	8	–	4
Eastern Kentucky	4	–	2	7	–	4
Central Arkansas	3	–	3	5	–	6
Jacksonville State	3	–	3	5	–	6
Abilene Christian	1	–	5	5	–	6
Lamar	0	–	6	1	–	9
$ – Conference champion; ^ – FCS playoff participant; Rankings from STATS Poll

The 2021 Central Arkansas Bears football team represented the University of Central Arkansas in the 2021 NCAA Division I FCS football season as a member of the ASUN Conference. The Bears were led by fourth-year head coach Nathan Brown and played their home games at Estes Stadium.

The ASUN Conference and Western Athletic Conference announced the formation of the WAC-ASUN Challenge (AQ7) for the 2021 season on February 23, 2021. The Challenge included the four fully qualified Division I (FCS) members of the WAC (Abilene Christian, Lamar, Sam Houston, and Stephen F. Austin) and Central Arkansas, Eastern Kentucky, and Jacksonville State of the ASUN Conference. The winner of the challenge received an auto-bid to the NCAA Division I FCS football playoffs.

== Schedule ==
Date	Time	Opponent	Rank	Site	TV	Result	Attendance
September 4	6:00 p.m.	at Arkansas State*	No. 14	Centennial Bank Stadium; Jonesboro, AR	ESPN3	L 21–40	15,662
September 11	7:00 p.m.	at No. 23 Missouri State*	No. 19	Robert W. Plaster Stadium; Springfield, MO	ESPN+	L 34–43	11,247
September 18	6:00 p.m.	Arkansas–Pine Bluff*	No. 25	Estes Stadium; Conway, AR	ESPN+	W 45–23	11,527
September 25	4:00 p.m.	No. 1 Sam Houston	No. 25	Estes Stadium; Conway, AR (ASUN/WAC Challenge)		L 35–45	9,475
October 2	6:00 p.m.	at Abilene Christian		Wildcat Stadium; Abilene, TX (ASUN/WAC Challenge)	ESPN+	W 42–21	6,602
October 16	4:00 p.m.	Eastern Kentucky		Estes Stadium; Conway, AR		L 35–38	5,438
October 23	6:00 p.m.	at Lamar		Provost Umphrey Stadium; Beaumont, TX (ASUN/WAC Challenge)	ESPN+	W 49–38	5,228
October 30	1:00 p.m.	at Jacksonville State		Burgess–Snow Field at JSU Stadium; Jacksonville, AL	ESPN+	W 38–14	13,907
November 6	4:00 p.m.	Texas Wesleyan*^{†}		Estes Stadium; Conway, AR		W 63–3	7,246
November 13	4:00 p.m.	Stephen F. Austin		Estes Stadium; Conway, AR (ASUN/WAC Challenge)	ESPN+	L 14–27	4,115
November 20	6:00 p.m.	at Tarleton State		Memorial Stadium; Stephenville, TX	ESPN+	L 3–24	6,528
*Non-conference game; ^{†}Homecoming; Rankings from STATS Poll released prior to the game; All times are in Central time

== Game summaries ==
=== No. 1 Sam Houston ===
	1	2	3	4	Total
No. 1 Bearkats	14	17	0	14	45
No. 25 Bears	7	7	14	7	35

Statistics	SHSU	CARK
First downs	23	19
Total yards	478	326
Rushing yards	195	38
Passing yards	283	288
Turnovers	1	2
Time of possession	33:08	26:52

Team	Category	Player	Statistics
Sam Houston	Passing	Eric Schmid	19/37, 283 yards, 4 TD
Sam Houston	Rushing	Ramon Jefferson	22 rushes, 104 yards, TD
Sam Houston	Receiving	Ife Adeyi	4 receptions, 80 yards
Central Arkansas	Passing	Breylin Smith	25/41, 288 yards, 4 TD, 2 INT
Central Arkansas	Rushing	Darius Hale	10 rushes, 36 yards, TD
Central Arkansas	Receiving	Tyler Hudson	11 receptions, 181 yards, 2 TD
