= 2021 Lamar Cardinals football team =

American college football season

2021 Lamar Cardinals football
- Conference: AQ7
- Record: 1–9 (0–6 AQ7)
- Head coach: Blane Morgan (2nd season)
- Co-offensive coordinators: Patrick Covington (2nd season); Ron Antoine (2nd season)
- Offensive scheme: Multiple
- Defensive coordinator: Matt Weikert (2nd season)
- Base defense: 3–4
- Home stadium: Provost Umphrey Stadium

2021 Western Athletic Conference football standings
	Conf.			Overall
Team	W		L	W		L
No. 5 Sam Houston $^	5	–	0	11	–	1
No. 21 Stephen F. Austin ^	4	–	1	8	–	4
Abilene Christian	2	–	2	5	–	6
Tarleton State *	2	–	3	6	–	5
Dixie State *	0	–	3	1	–	10
Lamar	0	–	4	1	–	9
$ – Conference champion; ^ – FCS playoff participant; * – Ineligible for FCS playoffs due to transition from Division II; Rankings from STATS Poll

2021 WAC–ASUN Challenge football standings
	Conf.			Overall
Team	W		L	W		L
No. 5 Sam Houston $^	6	–	0	11	–	1
No. 21 Stephen F. Austin ^	4	–	2	8	–	4
Eastern Kentucky	4	–	2	7	–	4
Central Arkansas	3	–	3	5	–	6
Jacksonville State	3	–	3	5	–	6
Abilene Christian	1	–	5	5	–	6
Lamar	0	–	6	1	–	9
$ – Conference champion; ^ – FCS playoff participant; Rankings from STATS Poll

The 2021 Lamar Cardinals football team represented Lamar University in the 2021 NCAA Division I FCS football season as a member of the Western Athletic Conference. The Cardinals were led by second-year head coach Blane Morgan and played their home games at Provost Umphrey Stadium. The game against North American University is not included in the Western Athletic Conference or AQ7 standings because it was classed as an exhibition game and was not countable due to NCAA policies.

The Western Athletic Conference and ASUN Conference announced the formation of the WAC-ASUN Challenge (AQ7) for the 2021 season on February 23, 2021. The Challenge included the four fully qualified Division I (FCS) members of the WAC (Abilene Christian, Lamar, Sam Houston, and Stephen F. Austin) and Central Arkansas, Eastern Kentucky, and Jacksonville State of the ASUN Conference. The winner of the challenge received an auto-bid to the NCAA Division I FCS football playoffs.

The Cardinals finished the season with a 1–9 overall record. They were 0–6 in AQ7 Challenge play finishing in seventh place.

== Preseason ==
=== Recruiting ===
Back	B	Center	C	Cornerback	CB	Defensive back	DB
Defensive end	DE	Defensive lineman	DL	Defensive tackle	DT	End	E
Fullback	FB	Guard	G	Halfback	HB	Kicker	K
Kickoff returner	KR	Offensive tackle	OT	Offensive lineman	OL	Linebacker	LB
Long snapper	LS	Punter	P	Punt returner	PR	Quarterback	QB
Running back	RB	Safety	S	Tight end	TE	Wide receiver	WR

College recruiting information (2021)
Name	Hometown	School	Height	Weight	40^{‡}	Commit date
Damian Alexander; CB	New Orleans, LA	Booker T. Washington High School	6 ft 0 in (1.83 m)	180 lb (82 kg)	–	
Damian Alexander; CB	Recruit ratings: Rivals:					
Alex Auer; K/P	Shreveport, LA	Captain Shreve High School	6 ft 0 in (1.83 m)	170 lb (77 kg)	–	
Alex Auer; K/P	Recruit ratings: No ratings found					
Jacob Bayer; OL	Grandview, TX	Grandview	6 ft 4 in (1.93 m)	315 lb (143 kg)	–	
Jacob Bayer; OL	Recruit ratings: 247Sports:					
Ayden Bell; DL	Silsbee, TX	Silsbee High School	6 ft 3 in (1.91 m)	273 lb (124 kg)	–	
Ayden Bell; DL	Recruit ratings: No ratings found					
Reggie Brooks; DL	Wylie, TX	Wylie East High School	6 ft 3 in (1.91 m)	295 lb (134 kg)	–	
Reggie Brooks; DL	Recruit ratings: No ratings found					
RJ Carver; RB	McKinney, TX	McKinney High School	5 ft 10 in (1.78 m)	215 lb (98 kg)		
RJ Carver; RB	Recruit ratings: No ratings found					
James Collins; OL	Mesquite, TX	John Horn High School	6 ft 3 in (1.91 m)	270 lb (120 kg)	–	
James Collins; OL	Recruit ratings: No ratings found					
Antorius Hambric; CB	Forney, TX	North Forney High School	5 ft 11 in (1.80 m)	175 lb (79 kg)	–	
Antorius Hambric; CB	Recruit ratings: No ratings found					
Dozie Ifeadi; WR	Tyler, TX	Bishop Thomas K. Gorman Catholic School	6 ft 1 in (1.85 m)	185 lb (84 kg)	–	
Dozie Ifeadi; WR	Recruit ratings: No ratings found					
Dane Jentsch; QB/S	Grandview, TX	Grandview High School	5 ft 11 in (1.80 m)	198 lb (90 kg)	–	
Dane Jentsch; QB/S	Recruit ratings: No ratings found					
Caleb Leonard; OL	Pearland, TX	Shadow Creek High School	6 ft 4 in (1.93 m)	310 lb (140 kg)	–	
Caleb Leonard; OL	Recruit ratings: 247Sports:					
Kerry McMillion; S	River Ridge, LA	John Curtis Christian School	6 ft 4 in (1.93 m)	190 lb (86 kg)	–	
Kerry McMillion; S	Recruit ratings: No ratings found					
Drew Moss; OL	Richardson, TX	Richardson High School	6 ft 4 in (1.93 m)	270 lb (120 kg)	–	
Drew Moss; OL	Recruit ratings: No ratings found					
Darion Peace; ILB/QB	Malakoff, TX	Malakoff High School	6 ft 1 in (1.85 m)	210 lb (95 kg)	–	
Darion Peace; ILB/QB	Recruit ratings: No ratings found					
Demarco Roberts; CB	Aledo, TX	Aledo High School	5 ft 8 in (1.73 m)	170 lb (77 kg)	–	
Demarco Roberts; CB	Recruit ratings: 247Sports:					
Colby Sessums; K/P	Haslet, TX	V.R. Eaton High School	6 ft 1 in (1.85 m)	180 lb (82 kg)	–	
Colby Sessums; K/P	Recruit ratings: No ratings found					
Ramond Stevens; CB	New Orleans, LA	Warren Easton Charter High School	5 ft 10 in (1.78 m)	165 lb (75 kg)	–	
Ramond Stevens; CB	Recruit ratings: No ratings found					
Javonta Thomas; WR	Van, TX	Van High School	5 ft 11 in (1.80 m)	190 lb (86 kg)	–	
Javonta Thomas; WR	Recruit ratings: No ratings found					
James Williams; OL	DeRidder, LA	DeRidder High School	6 ft 3 in (1.91 m)	293 lb (133 kg)	–	
James Williams; OL	Recruit ratings: No ratings found					
Jase Williams; ILB	Slidell, LA	Slidell High School	6 ft 2 in (1.88 m)	210 lb (95 kg)	–	
Jase Williams; ILB	Recruit ratings: No ratings found					
Caleb Arnold; OLB	Texarkana, TX	Texas High School	6 ft 1 in (1.85 m)	185 lb (84 kg)	–	
Caleb Arnold; OLB	Recruit ratings: No ratings found					
Treviance Bronson; DT	Katy, TX	James E. Taylor High School	6 ft 3 in (1.91 m)	290 lb (130 kg)	–	
Treviance Bronson; DT	Recruit ratings: No ratings found					
Breylon Charles; DE	New Orleans, LA	Destrehan High School	6 ft 5 in (1.96 m)	250 lb (110 kg)	–	
Breylon Charles; DE	Recruit ratings: 247Sports:					
Canden Grogan; WR	Mont Belvieu, TX	Barbers Hill High School	6 ft 3 in (1.91 m)	165 lb (75 kg)	–	
Canden Grogan; WR	Recruit ratings: No ratings found					
Damashja Harris; RB	Killeen, TX	Ellison High School	6 ft 2 in (1.88 m)	200 lb (91 kg)	–	
Damashja Harris; RB	Recruit ratings: No ratings found					
Keshaun Lazard; WR	Opelousas, LA	Northwest High School	6 ft 0 in (1.83 m)	175 lb (79 kg)	–	
Keshaun Lazard; WR	Recruit ratings: No ratings found					
Jaymond Jackson; DE	Lindale, TX	Lindale High School	6 ft 3 in (1.91 m)	212 lb (96 kg)	–	
Jaymond Jackson; DE	Recruit ratings: 247Sports:					
Tonga Lolohea; DE	Euless, TX	Trinity High School	6 ft 3 in (1.91 m)	212 lb (96 kg)	–	
Tonga Lolohea; DE	Recruit ratings: 247Sports:					
Adrian Owens; LB	Houston, TX	Langham Creek High School	6 ft 2 in (1.88 m)	220 lb (100 kg)	–	
Adrian Owens; LB	Recruit ratings: No ratings found					
Daelyn Williams; QB	Houston, TX	Dekaney High School	5 ft 10 in (1.78 m)	160 lb (73 kg)	–	
Daelyn Williams; QB	Recruit ratings: Rivals:					
Overall recruit ranking: 247Sports: #13 FCS, #144 FBS and FCS combined
Note: In many cases, Scout, Rivals, 247Sports, On3, and ESPN may conflict in their listings of height and weight.; In these cases, the average was taken. ESPN grades are on a 100-point scale.; Sources: "2020 Team Ranking". Rivals.com.

=== Preseason polls ===
==== WAC Poll ====
The Western Athletic Conference coaches released their preseason poll on July 27, 2021. The Cardinals were picked to finish fifth in the conference. In addition, one Cardinal, Anthony Ruffin, was chosen to the Preseason All-WAC Defense Team.

Predicted finish	Team	Votes (1st place)
1	Sam Houston	20 (5)
2	Stephen F. Austin	16 (1)
3	Tarleton State	11
4	Lamar	8
5	Abilene Christian	5

- Note: Dixie State is not included since they are not playing a full WAC schedule due to previous non-conference game contracts. Dixie State players are eligible for individual rewards.

==== Preseason All–WAC Team ====
Defense

- Anthony Ruffin – Defensive Back, SO

==== AQ7 Poll ====
The AQ7 coaches also released their preseason poll on July 27, 2021. The Cardinals were picked to finish seventh in the ASUN-WAC Challenge.

Predicted finish	Team	Votes (1st place)
1	Sam Houston	49 (7)
2	Central Arkansas	40
3	Jacksonville State	37
4	Stephen F. Austin	27
5	Eastern Kentucky	20
6	Abilene Christian	15
7	Lamar	8

== Schedule ==
Date	Time	Opponent	Site	TV	Result	Attendance
September 2	7:00 pm	North American*	Provost Umphrey Stadium; Beaumont, TX	ESPN+	W 47–3 (exhibition)	5,844
September 11	5:00 pm	at UTSA*	Alamodome; San Antonio, TX	ESPN3	L 0–54	16,229
September 18	3:00 pm	at Northern Colorado*	Nottingham Field; Greeley, CO	ESPN+	W 17–10 ^{OT}	5,605
September 25	6:00 pm	Abilene Christian*	Provost Umphrey Stadium; Beaumont, TX	ESPN+	L 0–56	5,411
October 9	2:00 pm	at No. 1 Sam Houston	Bowers Stadium; Huntsville, TX	ESPN+	L 7–41	9,836
October 16	3:00 pm	at Abilene Christian	Wildcat Stadium; Abilene, TX	ESPN+	L 17–24	10,121
October 23	6:00 pm	Central Arkansas	Provost Umphrey Stadium; Beaumont, TX (WAC/ASUN Challenge)	ESPN+	L 38–49	5,228
October 30	1:00 pm	at No. 25 Eastern Kentucky	Roy Kidd Stadium; Richmond, KY (WAC/ASUN Challenge)	ESPN+	L 10–42	8,462
November 6	6:00 pm	at Tarleton State	Memorial Stadium; Stephenville, TX	ESPN+	L 21–42	8,048
November 13	4:00 pm	Jacksonville State^{†}	Provost Umphrey Stadium; Beaumont, TX (WAC/ASUN Challenge)	ESPN+	L 7–38	6,812
November 20	4:00 pm	No. 22 Stephen F. Austin	Provost Umphrey Stadium; Beaumont, TX	ESPN+	L 6–42	5,411
*Non-conference game; ^{†}Homecoming; Rankings from STATS Poll released prior to the game; All times are in Central time

== Game summaries ==
=== North American ===
	1	2	3	4	Total
North American	0	0	0	3	3
Cardinals	14	17	13	3	47

Statistics

Statistics	North American	Lamar
First downs	8	19
Total yards	138	437
Rushing yards	10	243
Passing yards	128	194
Turnovers	1	0
Time of possession	23:21	36:39

Team	Category	Player	Statistics
North American	Passing	Randall Moore	11/30, 128 yards, long 22 yards
North American	Rushing	Kierr Cazenave	7 carries, 36 yards, long 17 yards
North American	Receiving	Dee Spivey	3 receptions, 44 yards, long 22 yards
Lamar	Passing	Jalen Dummett	6/8, 124 yards, long 42 yards, 2 TDs
Lamar	Rushing	Chaz Ward	15 carries, 59 yards, long 11 yards, 1 TDs
Lamar	Receiving	Erik Pizarro	2 receptions, 63 yards, long 41 yards, 1 TDs

=== At UTSA ===
	1	2	3	4	Total
Lamar	0	0	0	0	0
UTSA	13	21	10	10	54

Statistics

Statistics	Lamar	UTSA
First downs	10	20
Total yards	122	427
Rushing yards	89	106
Passing yards	33	321
Turnovers	3	1
Time of possession	30:27	29:33

Team	Category	Player	Statistics
Lamar	Passing	Jalen Dummett	6/11, 33 yards, long 14 yards
Lamar	Rushing	James Jones	13 carries, 52 yards, long 11 yards
Lamar	Receiving	Jeremy Davis	2 catches, 19 yards, long 11 yards
UTSA	Passing	Josh Adkins	11/13; 134 yards, long 32 yards, 2 TDs
UTSA	Rushing	Sincere McCormick	7 carries, 46 yards, long 18 yards, 2 TDs
UTSA	Receiving	Cade Stoever	2 catches, 84 yards, long 60 yards

=== At Northern Colorado ===
	1	2	3	4	OT	Total
Lamar	0	7	0	3	7	17
Northern Colorado	0	7	0	3	0	10

Statistics

Statistics	Lamar	Northern Colorado
First downs	16	12
Total yards	301	236
Rushing yards	202	84
Passing yards	99	152
Turnovers	2, 1 lost	0
Time of possession	28:35	31:25

Team	Category	Player	Statistics
Lamar	Passing	Jalen Dummett	7/13, 86 yards, long 36 yards
Lamar	Rushing	Chaz Ward	20 carries, 80 yards, long 10 yards
Lamar	Receiving	Erik Pizarro	3 catches, 66 yards, long 36 yards
Northern Colorado	Passing	Conner Martin	19/31, 152 yards, long 29 yards, 1 TD
Northern Colorado	Rushing	Gene Sledge, Jr	15 carries, 100 yards, long 25 yards
Northern Colorado	Receiving	Kassidy Woods	5 catches, 44 yards, long 29 yards

=== Abilene Christian ===
	1	2	3	4	Total
Abilene Christian	14	14	21	7	56
Lamar	0	0	0	0	0

Statistics

Statistics	Abilene Christian	Lamar
First downs	22	10
Total yards	461	136
Rushing yards	274	98
Passing yards	187	38
Turnovers	0	2
Time of possession	29:13	30:47

Team	Category	Player	Statistics
Abilene Christian	Passing	Stone Earl	13/18, 187 yards, long 32 yards, 3 TDs
Abilene Christian	Rushing	Peyton Mansell	6 carries, 107 yards, long 62 yards, 1 TD
Abilene Christian	Receiving	Kobe Clark	4 catches, 50 yards, long 16 yards, 1 TD
Lamar	Passing	Jalen Dummett	4/7, 38 yards, long 14 yards
Lamar	Rushing	Hunter Batten	7 carries, 29 yards, long 11 yards
Lamar	Receiving	Kirkland Banks	2 catches, 15 yards, long 10 yards

=== At No. 1 Sam Houston ===
	1	2	3	4	Total
Lamar	0	7	0	0	7
Sam Houston	14	6	7	14	41

Statistics

Statistics	Lamar	Sam Houston
First downs	10	24
Total yards	158	438
Rushing yards	23	267
Passing yards	135	171
Turnovers	0	1
Time of possession	31:39	28:21

Team	Category	Player	Statistics
Lamar	Passing	Mike Chandler	11/18, 135 yards
Lamar	Rushing	Chaz Ward	11 carries, 23 yards, long 8 yards
Lamar	Receiving	Jeremy Davis	2 catches, 52 yard, long 28 yards
Sam Houston State	Passing	Eric Schmid	13/31, 159 yards, 2 TDS
Sam Houston State	Rushing	Noah Smith	14 carries 120 yards, long 49 yards
Sam Houston State	Receiving	Cody Chrest	4 catches, 81 yards, long 37 yards.

=== At Abilene Christian ===
	1	2	3	4	Total
Lamar	0	17	0	0	17
Abilene Christian	7	7	7	3	24

Statistics

Statistics	Lamar	Abilene Christian
First downs	14	21
Total yards	364	466
Rushing yards	158	208
Passing yards	206	258
Turnovers	0	1
Time of possession	29:35	30:25

Team	Category	Player	Statistics
Lamar	Passing	Mike Chandler	9/17, 206 yds, 1 TD
Lamar	Rushing	James Jones	9 carries, 81 yds, 1 TD
Lamar	Receiving	Nathan Gaskamp	1 reception, 80 yards, 1 TD
Abilene Christian	Passing	Peyton Mansell	10/18, 135 yds
Abilene Christian	Rushing	Peyton Mansell	18 carries, 106 yds, 2 TD
Abilene Christian	Receiving	Davion Johnson	6 receptions, 82 yds

=== Central Arkansas ===
	1	2	3	4	Total
Central Arkansas	21	14	14	0	49
Lamar	7	0	16	15	38

Statistics

Statistics	Central Arkansas	Lamar
First downs	22	22
Total yards	541	441
Rushing yards	350	251
Passing yards	191	190
Turnovers	0	2
Time of possession	30:24	29:36

Team	Category	Player	Statistics
Central Arkansas	Passing	Breylin Smith	17/30; 149 yards; long 16; 1 TD
Central Arkansas	Rushing	Darius Hale	22 carries; 254 total yards; long 69; 4 TDS
Central Arkansas	Receiving	Tyler Hudson	6 catches; 98 total yards; long 42; 1 TD
Lamar	Passing	Mike Chandler	9/16; 154 yards; long 59; 2 TDS
Lamar	Rushing	Jalen Dummitt	15 carries; 131 total yards; long 33; 1 TD
Lamar	Receiving	Kirkland Banks	2 catches; 70 total yards; long 59; 1 TD

=== At No. 25 Eastern Kentucky ===
	1	2	3	4	Total
Lamar	0	7	3	0	10
No. 25 Eastern Kentucky	21	21	0	0	42

Statistics

Statistics	Lamar	Eastern Kentucky
First downs	12	20
Total yards	193	440
Rushing yards	116	217
Passing yards	77	223
Turnovers	0	0
Time of possession	31:34	28:26

Team	Category	Player	Statistics
Lamar	Passing	Jalen Dummett	5/7 - 55 yards; long 22 yards
Lamar	Rushing	Jalen Jackson	11 carries; 49 total yards; long 14
Lamar	Receiving	Marcellus Johnson	2 catches; 33 total yards; long 28
Eastern Kentucky	Passing	Parker McKinney	15/20 - 218 yards; long 39 yards
Eastern Kentucky	Rushing	Da'Joun Hewitt	20 carries; 101 total yards; long 22 yards; 2 TDS
Eastern Kentucky	Receiving	Dakota Allen	4 catches; 76 total yards; long 26; 2 TDS

=== At Tarleton State ===
	1	2	3	4	Total
Lamar	7	7	0	7	21
Tarleton State	7	14	7	14	42

Statistics

Statistics	Lamar	Tarleton State
First downs	16	20
Total yards	277	453
Rushing yards	193	134
Passing yards	84	319
Turnovers	0	0
Time of possession	31:46	29:20

Team	Category	Player	Statistics
Lamar	Passing	Daelyn Williams	9/18 - 84 yards; long 28 yards; 1 TD
Lamar	Rushing	Jaylon Jackson	7 carries; 55 total yards; long 42; 1 TD
Lamar	Receiving	Kirkland Banks	2 catches; 55 total yards; long 28; 2 TDS
Tarleton State	Passing	Steven Duncan	21/32; long 58 yards; 2 TDS
Tarleton State	Rushing	Ryheem Skinner	7 carries; 34 total yards; long 12; 1 TD
Tarleton State	Receiving	Marvin Landy	3 catches; 91 total yards; long 58

=== Jacksonville State ===
	1	2	3	4	Total
Jacksonville State	0	10	7	21	38
Lamar	7	0	0	0	7

Statistics

Statistics	Jacksonville State	Lamar
First downs	26	12
Total yards	493	147
Rushing yards	237	94
Passing yards	256	53
Turnovers	0	1
Time of possession	33:28	26:32

Team	Category	Player	Statistics
Jacksonville State	Passing	Zerrick Cooper	16/26 - 244 yards; long 33 yards; 3 TDs
Jacksonville State	Rushing	Ron Wiggins	8 carries; 102 total yards; long 55; 2 TDs
Jacksonville State	Receiving	Ahmad Edwards	5 catches; 95 total yards; long 33; 1 TD
Lamar	Passing	Daelyn Williams	6/18 - 53 yards; long 24 yards
Lamar	Rushing	Jaylon Jackson	22 carries; 89 total yards; long 19; 1 TD
Lamar	Receiving	Marcel Johnson	2 catches; 31 total yards; long 24

=== No. 22 Stephen F. Austin ===
	1	2	3	4	Total
No. 22 Stephen F. Austin	14	14	7	7	42
Lamar	0	6	0	0	6

Statistics

Statistics	Stephen F. Austin	Lamar
First downs	18	13
Total yards	398	200
Rushing yards	100	83
Passing yards	298	117
Turnovers	0	1
Time of possession	25:31	34:29

Team	Category	Player	Statistics
Stephen F. Austin	Passing	Trae Self	15/23 - 262 yards; long 68 yards; 2 TDs
Stephen F. Austin	Rushing	Miles Reed	8 carries; 44 total yards; long 12
Stephen F. Austin	Receiving	Xavier Gipson	6 catches; 164 total yards; long 68
Lamar	Passing	Daelyn Williams	7/19 - 116 yards; long 27 yards
Lamar	Rushing	Jalen Dummett	7 carries; 26 total yards; long 11
Lamar	Receiving	Erik Pizarro	4 catches; 85 total yards; long 27

== Roster ==
2021 Lamar Cardinals football team roster
Players
Coaches
Offense

Pos.	#	Name	Class
WR	2	James Jones	So
TE	3	Jeremy Davis	Jr
WR	4	Jack Roe	So
QB	5	Jalen Dummett	Jr
WR	6	Erik Pizarro	So
RB	7	Chaz Ward	So
WR	8	Tyrique Carter	Fr
QB	9	Mike Chandler	Fr
WR	10	Dozie Ifeadi	Fr
WR	11	Ethan Newton	Fr
WR	12	Marcellus Johnson	So
WR	13	Jacoby Davis	So
QB	14	Cameron George	Fr
QB	15	Kameron Ladia	Fr
QB	16	Anthony Brown	Fr
WR	17	Keshaun Lazard	Fr
QB	18	Daelyn Williams	Fr
RB	20	Jaylon Jackson	Fr
WR	23	Kirkland Banks	Sr
RB	26	Damashja Harris	Fr
RB	27	Tyson King	Fr
WR	29	Alex Connell	Fr
RB	31	Jackson Frazier	Fr
RB	36	Hunter Batten	Jr
RB	37	RJ Carver	Jr
TE	42	Steve Johnson	Fr
TE	44	Nathan Gaskamp	Jr
OL	54	Bless Harris	So
OL	55	James Collins	Fr
OL	60	Ashton Janise	Fr
OL	61	Caleb Leonard	Fr
TE	62	Devin Fregia	Fr
OL	64	Carter Murray	Fr
OL	65	Jacob Dicharry	Fr
OL	68	Alex Acosta	Fr
OL	69	Ji'Darrius Winans	Fr
OL	71	Jevale Roberson	Fr
OL	72	Marques Mayo	Fr
OL	73	Jacob Bayer	Fr
OL	74	James Williams	Fr
OL	75	Alexander Fritiof	Fr
OL	76	Drew Moss	Fr
OL	78	Devon King	Fr
WR	80	Luke Ferguson	Fr
TE	81	Devyn Gibbs	Fr
WR	82	Canden Grogan	Fr
WR	83	Vernon Mosley III	Fr
TE	84	Sterling Herrington	Fr
TE	85	Dawud Shorts	Jr
WR	86	David Jefferson	Fr
TE	87	Cole Kelly	Fr
TE	88	Conner Venetis	Fr
WR	89	Jovanta Harris	Fr

Defense

Pos.	#	Name	Class
LB	2	Vencent Rockwell	Fr
LB	3	Caimen Layne	Fr
DB	4	Steven Jones	Jr
DB	5	Anthony Ruffin	So
LB	6	Darion Peace	Fr
LB	7	Tyler Jackson	So
LB	8	Desmond Veals	Sr
DB	9	Kyron Norwood	Sr
DB	10	Divine Buckrham	Sr
LB	11	Aaron Calcote	Jr
DB	12	Antorius Hambric, Jr.	Fr
DB	13	Austin Goffney	Jr
DB	14	Ramond Stevens	Fr
DB	15	Kimani Johnson	Fr
LB	16	Caleb Arnold	Fr
DB	17	Damian Alexander	Fr
DB	18	Demarco Roberts	Fr
DB	19	Rodney Higdon	Fr
LB	21	Greg Hoofkin	Fr
DB	22	Jaden Hardin	Fr
DB	24	Devin Thomas	Fr
DB	25	Alex Meeks	Fr
DB	28	Seth Johnson	Fr
LB	30	Adrian Owens	Fr
DB	32	Patrick Brinkley	Fr
LB	33	Jordan Patterson	Fr
LB	34	Ladarian Martin	Fr
LB	35	Breylon Charles	Fr
LB	40	Jalen Freeman	Fr
LB	41	Kendal Rowen	Fr
DB	43	Dane Jentsch	Fr
LB	45	Jase Williams	Fr
LB	46	Austin Kennedy	Fr
DE	49	Jaymond Jackson	Fr
LB	51	Joseph Trim	Fr
LB	52	Blake Gotcher	Fr
LB	53	Cade Danna	Fr
DL	56	Addison Shackleford	So
DE	57	Tonga Lolohea	Fr
DL	58	Zac Yassine	Fr
DL	59	Jaxon Richards	Fr
DL	90	Tylo Phillips	Jr
DL	91	Vincent Rollins	Jr
DL	92	Kirsten Williams	Jr
DL	93	Jared Byrd	Fr
DL	94	Jack McCarthy	Fr
DL	95	Caleb Williams	Fr
DL	96	Ayden Bell	Fr
DT	97	Treviance Bronson	Fr
DL	98	Chidera Umeh	Fr
DL	99	Reggie Brooks	Fr

Special teams

Pos.	#	Name	Class
K/P	38	Alex Auer	Fr
K/P	39	Colby Sessums	Fr
K	47	Bailey Giffen	Sr
DS	50	Luke Wallis	So
DS	61	John Farris	Fr

Head coach

Blane Morgan

Coordinators/assistant coaches

- Patrick Covington, Off Coord and OL
- Ron Antoine, Co-Off Coord and WRs
- Matt Weikert, Def Coord and interior LBs
- Coby Gipson, Recruiting coord and RBs
- Jackson Eskierka, QBs
- Austen Jacobs, TEs
- Scott Thiessen, Outside LBs
- Wayne Cordova, Defensive Backs
- Cameron Davis, DLs
- Morgan Ford, QC
- Marshall Mann, Football Operations
- David Mertens, Graduate Assistant
- Daniel Darcy, Strength and Conditioning Coord

Legend

- (C) Team captain
- (S) Suspended
- (I) Ineligible
- Injured
- Redshirt

Roster
Last update: September 1, 2021

== TV and radio media ==
All Lamar games were broadcast on KLVI radio, also known as News Talk 560. Per a 2021 Western Athletic Conference agreement with ESPN, all home games were televised on one of the ESPN outlets.
