= 2021 Abilene Christian Wildcats football team =

American college football season

2021 Abilene Christian Wildcats football
- Conference: AQ7
- Record: 5–6 (1–5 AQ7)
- Head coach: Adam Dorrel (5th season)
- Offensive coordinator: Josh Lamberson (5th season)
- Offensive scheme: Single set back
- Defensive coordinator: Clint Brown (3rd season)
- Base defense: 4–3
- Home stadium: Anthony Field at Wildcat Stadium

2021 Western Athletic Conference football standings
| | Conf. | | | Overall |
| Team | W | | L | W | | L |
|---|---|---|---|---|---|---|
| No. 5 Sam Houston $^ | 5 | – | 0 | 11 | – | 1 |
| No. 21 Stephen F. Austin ^ | 4 | – | 1 | 8 | – | 4 |
| Abilene Christian | 2 | – | 2 | 5 | – | 6 |
| Tarleton State * | 2 | – | 3 | 6 | – | 5 |
| Dixie State * | 0 | – | 3 | 1 | – | 10 |
| Lamar | 0 | – | 4 | 1 | – | 9 |
$ – Conference champion; ^ – FCS playoff participant; * – Ineligible for FCS playoffs due to transition from Division II; Rankings from STATS Poll

2021 WAC–ASUN Challenge football standings
| | Conf. | | | Overall |
| Team | W | | L | W | | L |
|---|---|---|---|---|---|---|
| No. 5 Sam Houston $^ | 6 | – | 0 | 11 | – | 1 |
| No. 21 Stephen F. Austin ^ | 4 | – | 2 | 8 | – | 4 |
| Eastern Kentucky | 4 | – | 2 | 7 | – | 4 |
| Central Arkansas | 3 | – | 3 | 5 | – | 6 |
| Jacksonville State | 3 | – | 3 | 5 | – | 6 |
| Abilene Christian | 1 | – | 5 | 5 | – | 6 |
| Lamar | 0 | – | 6 | 1 | – | 9 |
$ – Conference champion; ^ – FCS playoff participant; Rankings from STATS Poll

The 2021 Abilene Christian Wildcats football team represented Abilene Christian University in the 2021 NCAA Division I FCS football season as a member of the Western Athletic Conference. The Wildcats were led by fifth-year head coach Adam Dorrel and played their home games at Anthony Field at Wildcat Stadium, Abilene, Texas. The Wildcats played their 100th season in 2021.

The Western Athletic Conference and ASUN Conference announced the formation of the WAC-ASUN Challenge (AQ7) for the 2021 season on February 23, 2021. The Challenge included the four fully qualified Division I (FCS) members of the WAC (Abilene Christian, Lamar, Sam Houston, and Stephen F. Austin) and Central Arkansas, Eastern Kentucky, and Jacksonville State of the ASUN Conference. The winner of the challenge received an auto-bid to the NCAA Division I FCS football playoffs.

== Preseason ==
=== Preseason polls ===
==== WAC Poll ====
The Western Athletic Conference coaches released their preseason poll on July 27, 2021. The Wildcats were picked to finish fifth in the conference.

| Predicted finish | Team | Votes (1st place) |
|---|---|---|
| 1 | Sam Houston | 20 (5) |
| 2 | Stephen F. Austin | 16 (1) |
| 3 | Tarleton State | 11 |
| 4 | Lamar | 8 |
| 5 | Abilene Christian | 5 |

- Note: Dixie State is not included since they are not playing a full WAC schedule due to previous non-conference game contracts. Dixie State players are eligible for individual rewards.

==== AQ7 Poll ====
The AQ7 coaches also released their preseason poll on July 27, 2021. The Wildcats were picked to finish sixth in the ASUN-WAC Challenge.

| Predicted finish | Team | Votes (1st place) |
|---|---|---|
| 1 | Sam Houston | 49 (7) |
| 2 | Central Arkansas | 40 |
| 3 | Jacksonville State | 37 |
| 4 | Stephen F. Austin | 27 |
| 5 | Eastern Kentucky | 20 |
| 6 | Abilene Christian | 15 |
| 7 | Lamar | 8 |

=== Recruits ===
College recruiting information (2021)
| Name | Hometown | School | Height | Weight | 40^{‡} | Commit date |
|---|---|---|---|---|---|---|
| Hayden Anderson; QB | Keller, Texas | Keller High School | 6 ft 1 in (1.85 m) | 185 lb (84 kg) | - | Jul 24, 2020 |
| Hayden Anderson; QB | Recruit ratings: Rivals: | | | | | |
| Tyrin Bradley; DE | Lubbock, Texas | Monterey High School (Lubbock, Texas) | 6 ft 4 in (1.93 m) | 245 lb (111 kg) | - | Dec 11, 2020 |
| Tyrin Bradley; DE | Recruit ratings: Rivals: ESPN: (73) | | | | | |
| Cirby Coheley; LB | Iowa Park, Texas | Iowa Park High School | 6 ft 3 in (1.91 m) | 205 lb (93 kg) | - | Jul 13, 2020 |
| Cirby Coheley; LB | Recruit ratings: Rivals: | | | | | |
| Colt Cooper; TE | Quinlan, Texas | Ford High School | 6 ft 3 in (1.91 m) | 230 lb (100 kg) | - | Jun 30, 2020 |
| Colt Cooper; TE | Recruit ratings: Rivals: | | | | | |
| Luke Dillingham; S | Brock, Texas | Brock High School (Texas) | 6 ft 1 in (1.85 m) | 195 lb (88 kg) | - | |
| Luke Dillingham; S | Recruit ratings: No ratings found | | | | | |
| Kyle Pointer; LB | Queen Creek, Arizona | Queen Creek High School | 6 ft 3 in (1.91 m) | 215 lb (98 kg) | - | |
| Kyle Pointer; LB | Recruit ratings: No ratings found | | | | | |
| Jar'Quae Walton; RB | Waco, Texas | La Vega High School | 5 ft 9 in (1.75 m) | 175 lb (79 kg) | - | Dec 13, 2020 |
| Jar'Quae Walton; RB | Recruit ratings: Rivals: | | | | | |
| Jackson Andrews; OL | Schertz, Texas | Samuel Clemens High School (Schertz) | 6 ft 4 in (1.93 m) | 295 lb (134 kg) | - | |
| Jackson Andrews; OL | Recruit ratings: Rivals: | | | | | |
| Landon Eades; DT | Boerne, Texas | Samuel V. Champion High School | 6 ft 3 in (1.91 m) | 280 lb (130 kg) | - | |
| Landon Eades; DT | Recruit ratings: No ratings found | | | | | |
| Isaiah Pedack; DT | Dallas, Texas | Highland Park High School (University Park, Texas) | 6 ft 3 in (1.91 m) | 250 lb (110 kg) | - | |
| Isaiah Pedack; DT | Recruit ratings: No ratings found | | | | | |
| Ethan Taite; OLB | Frisco, Texas | Independence High School (Frisco, Texas) | 6 ft 2 in (1.88 m) | 195 lb (88 kg) | - | |
| Ethan Taite; OLB | Recruit ratings: No ratings found | | | | | |
Overall recruit ranking:
‡ Refers to 40-yard dash; Note: In many cases, Scout, Rivals, 247Sports, On3, and ESPN may conflict in their listings of height, weight and 40 time.; In these cases, the average was taken. ESPN grades are on a 100-point scale.; Sources: "2021 Team Ranking". Rivals.com.

=== Transfers ===
| Name | No. | Pos. | Height | Weight | Year | Hometown | Prev. school |
|---|---|---|---|---|---|---|---|
| Trey Adams | #5 | LB | 5 ft 10 in (1.78 m) | 190 pounds (86 kg) | Redshirt Sophomore | Corvallis, Oregon | Northern Colorado |
| Alex Spadone | #7 | WR | 6 ft 2 in (1.88 m) | 216 pounds (98 kg) | Redshirt Junior | Houston, Texas | San Diego |
| Triston Anderson | #12 | CB | 6 ft 2 in (1.88 m) | 195 pounds (88 kg) | Redshirt Freshman | Rockwall, Texas | Arkansas State |
| Roland Williams III | #15 | DB | 5 ft 11 in (1.80 m) | 180 pounds (82 kg) | Redshirt Junior | Arlington, Tennessee | Richmond |
| Anthony Smith | #20 | RB | 5 ft 11 in (1.80 m) | 195 pounds (88 kg) | Redshirt Sophomore | Fort Worth, Texas | Texas State |
| Mike Garrett Jr. | #29 | DB | 6 ft 1 in (1.85 m) | 187 pounds (85 kg) | Redshirt Junior | Magnolia, Texas | Tulsa |
| John Brannon | #43 | LB | 6 ft 2 in (1.88 m) | 233 pounds (106 kg) | Senior | Prosper, Texas | Texas State |
| Kaleb Chester | #58 | OL | 6 ft 0 in (1.83 m) | 271 pounds (123 kg) | Sophomore | Grayson, Georgia | Lenoir–Rhyne |
| Derek Simmons | #73 | OL | 6 ft 5 in (1.96 m) | 311 pounds (141 kg) | Redshirt Freshman | Jacksonville, Florida | Tusculum |
| Reese Moore | #74 | OL | 6 ft 6 in (1.98 m) | 273 pounds (124 kg) | Redshirt Freshman | Seminole, Texas | Texas |
| Derek Simmons | #99 | DL | 6 ft 6 in (1.98 m) | 245 pounds (111 kg) | Redshirt Freshman | Bakersfield, California | Fresno State |
| Tyran Calloway | # | DT | 5 ft 11 in (1.80 m) | 249 pounds (113 kg) | Junior | Fort Worth, Texas | Howard Payne |

== Personnel ==
=== Roster ===
2021 Abilene Christian Wildcats football
| Quarterback: 2 Peyton Mansell – (redshirt) sophomore (6'2, 213); 3 Stone Earle – (redshirt) freshman (6'2, 203); 4 Sema'J Davis – senior (6'1, 191); 12 Hayden Anderson – freshman (6'1, 173); Trevor Baker – freshman (6'3, 186); Carson Cross – freshman (6'2, 185); Jace Robinson – freshman (6'0, 190); Running backs: 14 Quae Walton – freshman (5'10, 166); 20 Anthony Smith – (redshirt) sophomore (5'11, 209); 21 Jermiah Dobbins – (redshirt) freshman (5'11, 195); 24 Tyrese White – senior (5'10, 202); 31 Robert McKnight – (redshirt) senior (5'10, 186); 34 Charlie Moore – freshman (5'11, 220) (FB+); 36 Rece Stafford – (redshirt) freshman (6'0, 231) (FB+); 43 Easton Myrick – (redshirt) freshman (5'11, 195) (FB+); Jailen Dixon – freshman (6'3, 202); Jamal Stephens – freshman (5'8, 185); Wide receiver: 5 Darius Lewis – (redshirt) freshman (5'8, 163); 6 Taelyn Williams – (redshirt) junior (6'2, 169); 7 Alex Spadone – (redshirt) junior (6'2, 216); 8 Kobe Clark – junior (5'11, 180); 9 Davion Johnson – (redshirt) sophomore (5'8, 163); 13 Jordan Brooks-Wess – (redshirt) sophomore (5'10, 164); 16 Denver Holman – (redshirt) freshman (5'10, 179); 19 Dax Neece – (redshirt) freshman (6'3, 206); 80 Jackson Young – freshman (5'11, 183); 82 Cooper McCasland – (redshirt) freshman (6'1, 188); 87 Andrew Edwards – freshman (6'0, 178); Tanner Bowman – (redshirt) freshman (6'3, 185); Matthew Bynum – freshman (5'11, 160); Solomon Cole – freshman (5'10, 165); Jack Frazier – freshman (6'2, 192); Kendall Jimerson – (redshirt) freshman (5'10, 185); Tight ends: 81 Noah Caldwell – (redshirt) freshman (6'6, 245); 83 Colt Cooper – freshman (6'4, 240); 84 Grant Miles – (redshirt) sophomore (6'5, 252); 85 Andrew Stripling – (redshirt) freshman (6'5, 219); 86 Remington Lutz – (redshirt) junior (6'6, 241); Long snappers: 46 Dustin Inness – (redshirt) sophomore (5'11, 189); 54 David Stone – (redshirt) senior (6'0, 213); 60 Cade Lippincott – (redshirt) freshman (6'0, 213) | Offensive lineman: 51 Collin James – (redshirt) freshman (6'4, 273); 55 Alan Hatten – (redshirt) freshman (6'3, 300); 56 Truett Knox – (redshirt) freshman (6'2, 287); 57 Jaron Marshall – (redshirt) junior (6'3, 291); 58 Kaleb Chester – sophomore (6'0, 271); 59 Jacob Thielen – (redshirt) freshman (6'4, 292); 61 Mitchell Melrose – junior (6'6, 286); 62 Jackson Andrews – freshman (6'2, 300); 63 Peyten Girty – (redshirt) freshman (6'3, 280); 65 CJ Zotz – (redshirt) freshman (6'4, 292); 66 Dylan Howerton – (redshirt) freshman (6'5, 273); 67 Wyatt Tate – (redshirt) freshman (6'6, 290); 69 Bronson Warner – (redshirt) freshman (6'3, 310); 73 Derek Simmons – (redshirt) freshman (6'5, 311); 74 Reese Moore – (redshirt) freshman (6'6, 273); 76 Zach Terry – senior (6'6, 280); 78 Ty Smith – (redshirt) freshman (6'6, 296); Cohen Carpenter – freshman (6'3, 290); Brad Robinson – freshman (6'2, 260); Tai Sewell – freshman (6'5, 305); Defensive lineman: 40 Dre Jones – (redshirt) sophomore (6'4, 277); 41 Tyrin Bradley – (redshirt) sophomore (6'4, 242); 45 Jordan Paup – (redshirt) freshman (6'5, 250); 49 Dennis Herrold – (redshirt) freshman (6'4, 235); 50 Damion Hart – (redshirt) freshman (6'3, 235); 89 Cameron Byrom – (redshirt) freshman (6'5, 249); 90 Kadron Johnson – (redshirt) sophomore (6'4, 249); 91 Garviea Freeny – (redshirt) junior (6'3, 235); 92 Quent Titre – (redshirt) junior (6'2, 286); 93 Landon Eades – freshman (6'3, 283); 94 Osaretin Obadeyi – (redshirt) sophomore (6'5, 239); 95 Jack Schultz – (redshirt) junior (6'0, 280); 96 Isaiah Pedack – freshman (6'3, 255); 97 William Morgan – (redshirt) sophomore (6'3, 292); 99 Colby Warkentin – (redshirt) freshman (6'6, 245); Tyran Calloway – junior (5'11, 249); Tanner Rambeau – freshman (6'4, 270) | Linebacker: 5 Trey Adams – (redshirt) sophomore (5'10, 190); 9 Chike Nwankwo – (redshirt) sophomore (6'2, 224); 30 Tory Hargrove – (redshirt) junior (5'11, 210); 32 Joshua James – (redshirt) junior (6'0, 228); 33 Greg Green – (redshirt) junior (5'10, 217); 35 Ethan Taite – freshman (6'3, 205); 42 Hunter Kier – (redshirt) senior (5'11, 217); 43 John Brannon – senior (6'2, 233); 46 Cirby Coheley – freshman (6'4, 206); 47 Derrick Parker – freshman (6'1, 206); 52 Abe Schwinn – (redshirt) freshman (6'3, 219); 53 Zeke Lott – (redshirt) freshman (6'1, 205); Diego Diaz – freshman (5'10, 208); Dilaver Ibrahimi – freshman (5'10, 206); Kyle Pointer – freshman (6'3, 213); Defensive backs: 1 Shelby Washington – (redshirt) junior (6'1, 190); 2 Christopher Satterfield – (redshirt) freshman (5'10, 190); 3 Ryan Stapp – (redshirt) sophomore (6'0, 170); 7 Elijah Moffett – (redshirt) freshman (6'2, 195); 12 Triston Anderson – (redshirt) freshman (6'2, 195); 15 Roland Williams III – (redshirt) junior (5'11, 180); 17 Dishon Hall II – sophomore (6'3, 195); 22 Koy Richardson – (redshirt) senior (5'11, 178); 23 Kameron Stokes – (redshirt) freshman (6'0, 203); 24 Luke Dillingham – Freshman (6'2, 198); 26 Brian Bullock – (redshirt) Junior (6'0, 198); 29 Mike Garrett Jr. – (redshirt) Junior (6'1, 187); 31 Keegan Tharp – (redshirt) Freshman (6'2, 198); 39 Anthony Egbo, Jr. – (redshirt) Sophomore (5'8, 180); Jeremy Gonzales – Freshman (5'7, 165); Jamal Marshall – Freshman (6'0, 186); Quintin Montgomery – Sophomore (5'11, 183); Casen Olsen – Freshman (6'1, 189); Landon Reynolds – (redshirt) Freshman (5'8, 185); Manny Ruiz – Freshman (5'8, 163); Placekickers: 37 Blair Zepeda – (redshirt) Sophomore (5'11, 205); 85 Oscar Hernandez – (redshirt) Sophomore (5'11, 197); Punter: 88 Will Fargason – (redshirt) Freshman (6'2, 204); 88 Brock Thompson – (redshirt) Freshman (5'11, 161) |

=== Coaching staff ===
| Name | Position | Alma mater | Joined Staff |
|---|---|---|---|
| Adam Dorrel | Head Coach | Northwest Missouri State (1998) | 2016 |
| Josh Lamberson | Offensive Coordinator / Quarterbacks | Northwest Missouri State (2005) | 2016 |
| Clint Brown | Defensive Coordinator | | |
| James Curlee | Wide Receivers | Hastings College (2016) | 2017 |
| Travis Dixon | Cornerbacks | UNLV (2010) | 2020 |
| Zach Williams | Safeties / Co-Recruiting Coordinator | | |
| Bryce Baccarini | Running Backs / Fullbacks / Co-Recruiting Coordinator | | |
| Travis Britz | Defensive Line | Kansas State (2017) | 2020 |
| Cody Scribner | Defensive Line | Central Missouri (2010) | 2020 |
| Drew Liddle | Offensive Line | Kansas State (2014) | 2021 |
| Dimitri Donald | Tight Ends | West Texas A&M (2015) | 2021 |

== Depth chart ==
Defense

FS
Bryan Bullock
Koy Richardson

| WLB | MLB | SLB |
|---|---|---|
| ⋅ | Hunter Kier | ⋅ |
| John Brannon | Chike Nwanko | ⋅ |

SS
Elijah Moffett
Koy Richardson

CB
Ryan Stapp
Ira Branch

| DE | DT | DT | DE |
|---|---|---|---|
| Garviea Freeny | Will Morgan | Quent Titre | Jordan Paup |
| Osaretin Obadeyi | Dre Jones | Jack Schultz | Kadron Johnson |

CB
Triston Anderson
Roland Williams III

Offense

WR
Alex Spadone
Dax Neece

WR
Kobe Clark
Jordan Brooks-Wess

| LT | LG | C | RG | RT |
|---|---|---|---|---|
| Reese Moore | Truett Knox | Collin James | Jacob Thielen | Derek Simmons |
| Dylan Howerton | Alan Hatten | Peyton Girty | Bronson Warner | Wyatt Tate |

TE
Remington Lutz
Grant Miles

WR
Darius Lewis
Davion Johnson

QB
Stone Earle
Peyton Mansell

Special teams
PK Blair Zepeda
PK Oscar Hernandez
P Logan Burke
P Will Fargason
KR Jordan Brooks-Wess
PR Jordan Brooks-Wess
LS David Stone
H Logan Burke

RB
Jermiah Dobbins
Tyrese White

== Schedule ==
| Date | Time | Opponent | Site | TV | Result | Attendance |
|---|---|---|---|---|---|---|
| September 4 | 6:00 p.m. | at SMU* | Gerald J. Ford Stadium; Dallas, TX | ESPN+ | L 9–56 | 23,373 |
| September 11 | 6:00 p.m. | Louisiana College* | Wildcat Stadium; Abilene, TX | ESPN+ | W 62–7 | 8,117 |
| September 18 | 6:00 p.m. | Texas–Permian Basin* | Wildcat Stadium; Abilene, TX | ESPN+ | W 34–9 | 9,018 |
| September 25 | 6:00 p.m. | at Lamar* | Provost Umphrey Stadium; Beaumont, TX | ESPN+ | W 56–0 | 5,411 |
| October 2 | 6:00 p.m. | Central Arkansas | Wildcat Stadium; Abilene, TX (WAC/ASUN Challenge) | ESPN+ | L 21–42 | 6,602 |
| October 9 | 5:00 p.m. | at Eastern Kentucky | Roy Kidd Stadium; Richmond, KY (WAC/ASUN Challenge) | ESPN+ | L 15–30 | 8,659 |
| October 16 | 3:00 p.m. | Lamar^{†} | Wildcat Stadium; Abilene, TX | ESPN+ | W 24–17 | 10,121 |
| October 30 | 4:00 p.m. | at Stephen F. Austin | Homer Bryce Stadium; Nacogdoches, TX | ESPN+ | L 27–41 | 9,817 |
| November 6 | 1:00 p.m. | at Jacksonville State | Burgess–Snow Field at JSU Stadium; Jacksonville, AL (WAC/ASUN Challenge) | ESPN+ | L 25–40 | 14,143 |
| November 13 | 1:00 p.m. | Tarleton State | Wildcat Stadium; Abilene, TX | ESPN+ | W 29–3 | 6,213 |
| November 20 | 1:00 p.m. | No. 1 Sam Houston | Wildcat Stadium; Abilene, TX | ESPN+ | L 9–35 | 4,421 |
*Non-conference game; ^{†}Homecoming; Rankings from STATS Poll released prior to the game; All times are in Central time

== Game summaries ==
=== at SMU ===
Abilene Christian at SMU

| Team | 1 | 2 | 3 | 4 | Total |
|---|---|---|---|---|---|
| Wildcats | 0 | 3 | 6 | 0 | 9 |
| • Mustangs | 7 | 28 | 14 | 7 | 56 |

- Date: September 4
- Location: Gerald J. Ford Stadium
  University Park, TX
- Game start: 6:06 p.m. CDT
- Elapsed time: 3 hours and 21 minutes
- Game attendance: 23,373
- Game weather: Temperature: 95 °F (35 °C) • Weather: Sunny • Wind: SE 7 MPH
- Referee: Tim Rich
- TV announcers (ESPN+): Ted Emrich (play–by–play), Stanford Routt (analyst) and Morgan Uber (sideline)

Scoring summary
| 1 | 11:19 | SMU | Grant Calcaterra 21–yard pass from Tanner Mordecai (Blake Mazza kick) (3 plays, 44 yards, 1:04) | SMU 7–0 |
| 2 | 10:55 | SMU | Grant Calcaterra 8–yard pass from Tanner Mordecai (Blake Mazza kick) (11 plays, 68 yards, 4:51) | SMU 14–0 |
| 2 | 07:41 | SMU | Danny Gray 30–yard pass from Tanner Mordecai (Blake Mazza kick) (5 plays, 64 yards, 1:47) | SMU 21–0 |
| 2 | 05:01 | SMU | Danny Gray 27–yard pass from Tanner Mordecai (Blake Mazza kick) (4 plays, 31 yards, 1:16) | SMU 28–0 |
| 2 | 03:06 | ACU | Blair Zepeda 47–yard field goal (5 plays, 60 yards, 1:50) | SMU 28–3 |
| 2 | 00:29 | SMU | Rashee Rice 30–yard pass from Tanner Mordecai (Blake Mazza kick) (8 plays, 75 yards, 2:37) | SMU 35–3 |
| 3 | 10:33 | SMU | Nolan Matthews 8–yard pass from Tanner Mordecai (Blake Mazza kick) (9 plays, 65 yards, 4:27) | SMU 42–3 |
| 3 | 04:38 | ACU | Kobe Clark 11–yard pass from Stone Earle (pass failed) (16 plays, 75 yards, 5:55) | SMU 42–9 |
| 3 | 00:46 | SMU | Nolan Matthews 31–yard pass from Tanner Mordecai (Blake Mazza kick) (9 plays, 75 yards, 3:52) | SMU 49–9 |
| 4 | 11:44 | SMU | Brandon Epton Jr. 2–yard run (Brendan Hall kick) (1 play, 2 yards, 0:04) | SMU 56–9 |

| Statistics | ACU | SMU |
|---|---|---|
| First downs | 14 | 27 |
| Total yards | 332 | 490 |
| Rushing yards | 119 | 171 |
| Passing yards | 213 | 319 |
| Turnovers | 4 | 1 |
| Time of possession | 28:22 | 31:38 |

| Team | Category | Player | Statistics |
|---|---|---|---|
| Abilene Christian | Passing | Stone Earle | 13/28, 160 yards, TD, 2 INT |
| Abilene Christian | Rushing | Peyton Mansell | 2 carries, 33 yards |
| Abilene Christian | Receiving | Kobe Clark | 6 receptions, 89 yards, TD |
| SMU | Passing | Tanner Mordecai | 24/30, 317 yards, 7 TD |
| SMU | Rushing | Ulysses Bentley IV | 10 carries, 48 yards |
| SMU | Receiving | Danny Gray | 4 receptions, 72 yards, 2 TD |

=== Louisiana College ===
| | 1 | 2 | 3 | 4 | Total |
|---|---|---|---|---|---|
| LC Wildcats | 0 | 7 | 0 | 0 | 7 |
| ACU Wildcats | 27 | 14 | 7 | 14 | 62 |

=== UT Permian Basin ===
| | 1 | 2 | 3 | 4 | Total |
|---|---|---|---|---|---|
| Falcons | 3 | 0 | 0 | 6 | 9 |
| Wildcats | 0 | 27 | 0 | 7 | 34 |

=== at Lamar ===
| | 1 | 2 | 3 | 4 | Total |
|---|---|---|---|---|---|
| Wildcats | 14 | 14 | 21 | 7 | 56 |
| Cardinals | 0 | 0 | 0 | 0 | 0 |

Statistics

| Statistics | Abilene Christian | Lamar |
|---|---|---|
| First downs | 22 | 10 |
| Total yards | 461 | 136 |
| Rushing yards | 274 | 98 |
| Passing yards | 187 | 38 |
| Turnovers | 0 | 2 |
| Time of possession | 29:13 | 30:47 |

| Team | Category | Player | Statistics |
|---|---|---|---|
| Abilene Christian | Passing | Stone Earl | 13/18, 187 yards, long 32 yards, 3 TDs |
| Abilene Christian | Rushing | Peyton Mansell | 6 carries, 107 yards, long 62 yards, 1 TD |
| Abilene Christian | Receiving | Kobe Clark | 4 catches, 50 yards, long 16 yards, 1 TD |
| Lamar | Passing | Jalen Dummett | 4/7, 38 yards, long 14 yards |
| Lamar | Rushing | Hunter Batten | 7 carries, 29 yards, long 11 yards |
| Lamar | Receiving | Kirkland Banks | 2 catches, 15 yards, long 10 yards |

=== Central Arkansas ===
| | 1 | 2 | 3 | 4 | Total |
|---|---|---|---|---|---|
| Bears | 0 | 14 | 14 | 14 | 42 |
| Wildcats | 7 | 14 | 0 | 0 | 21 |

=== at Eastern Kentucky ===
| | 1 | 2 | 3 | 4 | Total |
|---|---|---|---|---|---|
| Wildcats | 0 | 7 | 0 | 8 | 15 |
| Colonels | 10 | 17 | 3 | 0 | 30 |

=== Lamar ===
| | 1 | 2 | 3 | 4 | Total |
|---|---|---|---|---|---|
| Cardinals | 0 | 17 | 0 | 0 | 17 |
| Wildcats | 7 | 7 | 7 | 3 | 24 |

Statistics

| Statistics | Lamar | Abilene Christian |
|---|---|---|
| First downs | 14 | 21 |
| Total yards | 364 | 466 |
| Rushing yards | 158 | 208 |
| Passing yards | 206 | 258 |
| Turnovers | 0 | 1 |
| Time of possession | 29:35 | 30:25 |

| Team | Category | Player | Statistics |
|---|---|---|---|
| Lamar | Passing | Mike Chandler | 9/17, 206 yds, 1 TD |
| Lamar | Rushing | James Jones | 9 carries, 81 yds, 1 TD |
| Lamar | Receiving | Nathan Gaskamp | 1 reception, 80 yards, 1 TD |
| Abilene Christian | Passing | Peyton Mansell | 10/18, 135 yds |
| Abilene Christian | Rushing | Peyton Mansell | 18 carries, 106 yds, 2 TD |
| Abilene Christian | Receiving | Davion Johnson | 6 receptions, 82 yds |

=== at SFA ===
| | 1 | 2 | 3 | 4 | Total |
|---|---|---|---|---|---|
| Wildcats | 3 | 3 | 7 | 14 | 27 |
| Lumberjacks | 3 | 17 | 14 | 7 | 41 |

=== at Jacksonville State ===
| | 1 | 2 | 3 | 4 | Total |
|---|---|---|---|---|---|
| Wildcats | 0 | 10 | 7 | 8 | 25 |
| Gamecocks | 14 | 6 | 7 | 13 | 40 |

=== Tarleton ===
| | 1 | 2 | 3 | 4 | Total |
|---|---|---|---|---|---|
| Texans | 3 | 0 | 0 | 0 | 3 |
| Wildcats | 3 | 10 | 0 | 16 | 29 |

=== No. 1 Sam Houston ===
| | 1 | 2 | 3 | 4 | Total |
|---|---|---|---|---|---|
| No. 1 Bearkats | 14 | 14 | 7 | 0 | 35 |
| Wildcats | 0 | 3 | 6 | 0 | 9 |
