= 2021 Dixie State Trailblazers football team =

American college football season

2021 Dixie State Trailblazers football
- Conference: Western Athletic Conference
- Record: 1–10 (0–3 WAC)
- Head coach: Paul Peterson (3rd season)
- Offensive coordinator: Kelly Bills (2nd season)
- Defensive coordinator: Justin Ena (1st season)
- Home stadium: Greater Zion Stadium

2021 Western Athletic Conference football standings
	Conf.			Overall
Team	W		L	W		L
No. 5 Sam Houston $^	5	–	0	11	–	1
No. 21 Stephen F. Austin ^	4	–	1	8	–	4
Abilene Christian	2	–	2	5	–	6
Tarleton State *	2	–	3	6	–	5
Dixie State *	0	–	3	1	–	10
Lamar	0	–	4	1	–	9
$ – Conference champion; ^ – FCS playoff participant; * – Ineligible for FCS playoffs due to transition from Division II; Rankings from STATS Poll

The 2021 Dixie State Trailblazers football team represented Dixie State University—now known as Utah Tech University—as a member of the Western Athletic Conference (WAC) during the 2021 NCAA Division I FCS football season. They were led by third-year head coach Paul Peterson, and played their home games at Greater Zion Stadium in St. George, Utah. Due to the NCAA's transition rules, they were not eligible for the 2021 FCS Playoffs. Dixie State did not play a full WAC schedule in 2021 due to previous non-conference contracts.

This was Dixie State's final season under that name; the school changed its name to Utah Tech University effective as of the 2022–23 school year. The Trailblazers nickname was not affected.

== Preseason ==
=== WAC preseason teams ===
The Western Athletic Conference coaches released their preseason poll and teams on July 27, 2021. Dixie State was not included in the preseason poll since the Trailblazers were not playing a full WAC schedule due to previous non-conference game contracts. Dixie State players were eligible for individual rewards. Quali Conley was chosen to the Preseason All-WAC Offense Team.

==== Preseason All–WAC Team ====
Offense

- Quali Conley – running back, FR

== Schedule ==
Date	Time	Opponent	Site	TV	Result	Attendance
September 4	7:00 p.m.	Sacramento State*	Greater Zion Stadium; St. George, UT	ESPN+	L 7–19	6,656
September 11	8:00 p.m.	No. 10 Weber State*	Greater Zion Stadium; St. George, UT	ESPN+	L 3–41	8,280
September 18	8:00 p.m.	at No. 14 UC Davis*	UC Davis Health Stadium; Davis, CA	ESPN+	L 27–60	9,865
October 2	5:00 p.m.	at No. 2 South Dakota State*	Dana J. Dykhouse Stadium; Brookings, SD	ESPN+	L 7–55	14,427
October 9	1:00 p.m.	at No. 6 Montana*	Washington–Grizzly Stadium; Missoula, MT	ESPN+	L 14–31	23,434
October 16	7:00 p.m.	Tarleton State	Greater Zion Stadium; St. George, UT	ESPN+	L 20–41	3,406
October 23	7:00 p.m.	Stephen F. Austin^{†}	Greater Zion Stadium; St. George, UT	ESPN+	L 20–37	4,442
October 30	11:00 a.m.	at Delaware*	Delaware Stadium; Newark, DE	FloSports	L 10–17	8,391
November 6	11:00 a.m.	at No. 1 Sam Houston	Bowers Stadium; Huntsville, TX	ESPN+	L 10–59	5,004
November 13	7:00 p.m.	Fort Lewis*	Greater Zion Stadium; St. George, UT	ESPN+	W 62–21	2,789
November 20	7:00 p.m.	No. 14 Missouri State*	Greater Zion Stadium; St. George, UT	ESPN+	L 24–55	2,794
*Non-conference game; ^{†}Homecoming; Rankings from STATS Poll released prior to the game; All times are in Mountain time

== Game summaries ==
=== Sacramento State ===
	1	2	3	4	Total
Hornets	5	7	7	0	19
Trailblazers	0	7	0	0	7

=== No. 10 Weber State ===
	1	2	3	4	Total
No. 10 Wildcats	7	7	13	14	41
Trailblazers	3	0	0	0	3

=== At No. 14 UC Davis ===
	1	2	3	4	Total
Trailblazers	7	6	14	0	27
No. 14 Aggies	15	21	3	21	60

=== At No. 2 South Dakota State ===
	1	2	3	4	Total
Trailblazers	0	0	0	7	7
No. 2 Jackrabbits	0	35	7	13	55

=== At No. 6 Montana ===
	1	2	3	4	Total
Trailblazers	0	0	0	14	14
No. 6 Grizzlies	0	3	14	14	31

=== Tarleton State ===
	1	2	3	4	Total
Texans	14	17	0	10	41
Trailblazers	10	3	0	7	20

=== Stephen F. Austin ===
	1	2	3	4	Total
Lumberjacks	7	13	7	10	37
Trailblazers	0	3	7	10	20

=== At Delaware ===
	1	2	3	4	Total
Trailblazers	0	7	3	0	10
Blue Hens	7	10	0	0	17

=== At No. 1 Sam Houston ===
	1	2	3	4	Total
Trailblazers	0	0	3	7	10
No. 1 Bearkats	28	17	7	7	59

=== Fort Lewis ===
	1	2	3	4	Total
Skyhawks	7	0	7	7	21
Trailblazers	14	35	10	3	62

=== No. 14 Missouri State ===
Game Eleven: #14 Missouri State Bears (7–3) at Dixie State Trailblazers (1–9)

Quarter	1	2	3	4	Total
No. 14 Bears	3	24	14	14	55
Trailblazers	3	0	7	14	24

at Greater Zion Stadium • St. George, UT

- Date: Saturday, November 20, 2021
- Game time: 8:00 p.m. CDT
- Game weather: 57 °F (14 °C), breezy; clear, crisp
- Game attendance: 2,794
- Referee: Marcus Thorton • Umpire: Scott Johnson • Linesman: Jeremy Jolles • Line judge: Keith Laurant • Back judge: Joe Wise • Field judge: Tom Drzazgowski • Side judge: Patrick Herron
- TV announcers (ESPN+): Devin Dixon and Andy Thompson

Game information

First Quarter

- (13:01) MSU - Jose Pizano 39 yard field goal (Drive: 6 plays, 53 yards, 1:59; MSU 0-3)
- (08:18) DSU - Connor Brooksby 45 yard field goal (Drive: 12 plays, 47 yards, 4:43; TIED 3-3)

Second Quarter

- (12:38) MSU - Tobias Little 7 yard run, Jose Pizano kick (Drive: 13 plays, 70 yards, 5:03; MSU 3-10)
- (09:58) MSU - Jose Pizano 25 yard field goal (Drive: 5 plays, 63 yards, 1:20; MSU 3-13)
- (08:18) MSU - Kevon Latulas 68 yard run, Jose Pizano kick (Drive: 1 play, 68 yards, 0:14; MSU 3-20)
- (06:50) MSU - Kevon Latulas 7 yard run, Jose Pizano kick (Drive: 3 plays, 50 yards, 0:34; MSU 3-27)

Third Quarter

- (06:18) MSU - Jason Shelley 12 yard run, Jose Pizano kick (Drive: 9 plays, 68 yards, 4:57; MSU 3-34)
- (05:57) MSU - Lemondre Joe 38 yard interception return, Jose Pizano kick (MSU 3-41)
- (01:41) DSU - Kobe Tracy 4 yard run, Andrew Day kick (Drive: 9 plays, 75 yards, 4:16; MSU 10-41)

Fourth Quarter

- (06:32) DSU - Cade Veach 13 yard pass from Kobe Tracy, Andrew Day kick (Drive: 12 plays, 92 yards, 3:30; MSU 17-48)
- (03:19) DSU - Devyn Perkins 95 yard interception return, Andrew Day kick (MSU 24-48)
- (03:14) MSU - Steven Ward 57 yard kickoff return, Jose Pizano kick (MSU 24-55)

Statistics	MSU	DSU
First downs	26	21
Total yards	574	382
Rushes/yards	36/297	36/75
Passing yards	277	307
Passing: Comp–Att–Int	15-29-1	24-49-1
Time of possession	28:50	31:10

Team	Category	Player	Statistics
Missouri State	Passing	Jason Shelley	13/24, 251 yards, 1 TD
Missouri State	Rushing	Kevon Latulas	8 carries, 162 yards, 2 TD
Missouri State	Receiving	Ty Scott	8 catches, 174 yards
Dixie State	Passing	Kobe Tracy	24/49, 307 yards, 1 TD, 1 INT
Dixie State	Rushing	Drew Kannely-Robles	22 carries, 78 yards
Dixie State	Receiving	Keith Davis	7 catches, 146 yards
