= 2021 Jacksonville State Gamecocks football team =

American football team

2021 Jacksonville State Gamecocks football
- Conference: AQ7 (Western Athletic Conference + ASUN Conference)
- Record: 5–6 (3–3 AQ7)
- Head coach: John Grass (8th season; first 9 games); Maxwell Thurmond (interim; final 2 games)
- Offensive coordinator: Jimmy Ogle (22nd season)
- Offensive scheme: Spread
- Co-defensive coordinators: William Green (3rd season); Owen Kilgore (3rd season)
- Base defense: Multiple
- Home stadium: Burgess–Snow Field at JSU Stadium

2021 WAC–ASUN Challenge football standings
	Conf.			Overall
Team	W		L	W		L
No. 5 Sam Houston $^	6	–	0	11	–	1
No. 21 Stephen F. Austin ^	4	–	2	8	–	4
Eastern Kentucky	4	–	2	7	–	4
Central Arkansas	3	–	3	5	–	6
Jacksonville State	3	–	3	5	–	6
Abilene Christian	1	–	5	5	–	6
Lamar	0	–	6	1	–	9
$ – Conference champion; ^ – FCS playoff participant; Rankings from STATS Poll

The 2021 Jacksonville State Gamecocks football team represented Jacksonville State University in the 2021 NCAA Division I FCS football season. The Gamecocks competed in the AQ7, a football partnership between the Western Athletic Conference (WAC) and the ASUN Conference, until the ASUN began play as a football conference. Jacksonville State was led by eighth-year head coach John Grass for the first nine games of the season before Grass resigned. Maxwell Thurmond was appointed interim head coach for the final two games of the year. Jacksonville State finished the season with an overall record of 5–6 and a mark of 3–3 in conference play, tying for fourth place in the AQ7. The team played home games at Burgess–Snow Field at JSU Stadium in Jacksonville, Alabama.

== Schedule ==
Date	Time	Opponent	Rank	Site	TV	Result	Attendance
September 1	6:30 p.m.	vs. UAB*	No. 10	Cramton Bowl; Montgomery, AL	ESPN	L 0–31	9,122
September 11	7:00 p.m.	at Florida State*	No. 16	Doak Campbell Stadium; Tallahassee, FL	ACCN	W 20–17	60,198
September 18	6:00 p.m.	North Alabama*	No. 10	Burgess–Snow Field at JSU Stadium; Jacksonville, AL	ESPN+	W 27–24	20,992
September 25	3:00 p.m.	UT Martin*	No. 9	Burgess–Snow Field at JSU Stadium; Jacksonville, AL	ESPN+	L 31–34	18,648
October 2	2:00 p.m.	at No. 20 Kennesaw State*	No. 17	Fifth Third Bank Stadium; Kennesaw, GA	ESPN+	L 6–31	7,476
October 9	3:00 p.m.	No. 23 Stephen F. Austin^{†}	No. 24	Burgess–Snow Field at JSU Stadium; Jacksonville, AL	ESPN+	W 28–24	16,355
October 23	2:00 p.m.	at No. 1 Sam Houston		Bowers Stadium; Huntsville, TX	ESPN+	L 7–42	7,559
October 30	1:00 p.m.	Central Arkansas		Burgess–Snow Field at JSU Stadium; Jacksonville, AL	ESPN+	L 14–38	13,907
November 6	1:00 p.m.	Abilene Christian		Burgess–Snow Field at JSU Stadium; Jacksonville, AL	ESPN+	W 40–25	14,143
November 13	4:00 p.m.	at Lamar		Provost Umphrey Stadium; Beaumont, TX	ESPN+	W 38–7	6,812
November 20	1:00 p.m.	at Eastern Kentucky		Roy Kidd Stadium; Richmond, KY	ESPN+	L 31–39 ^{2OT}	11,682
*Non-conference game; ^{†}Homecoming; Rankings from STATS Poll released prior to the game; All times are in Central time
