= 2021 Tarleton State Texans football team =

American football team

2021 Tarleton State Texans football
- Conference: Western Athletic Conference
- Record: 6–5 (2–3 WAC)
- Head coach: Todd Whitten (12th season)
- Co-offensive coordinators: Jonathan Beasley (5th season); Scott Carey (4th season)
- Offensive scheme: Spread
- Defensive coordinator: Marcus Patton (6th season)
- Base defense: 4–3
- Home stadium: Memorial Stadium

2021 Western Athletic Conference football standings
	Conf.			Overall
Team	W		L	W		L
No. 5 Sam Houston $^	5	–	0	11	–	1
No. 21 Stephen F. Austin ^	4	–	1	8	–	4
Abilene Christian	2	–	2	5	–	6
Tarleton State *	2	–	3	6	–	5
Dixie State *	0	–	3	1	–	10
Lamar	0	–	4	1	–	9
$ – Conference champion; ^ – FCS playoff participant; * – Ineligible for FCS playoffs due to transition from Division II; Rankings from STATS Poll

The 2021 Tarleton State Texans football team represented Tarleton State University in the 2021 NCAA Division I FCS football season. The Texans played their home games at Memorial Stadium in Stephenville, Texas, and were coached by Todd Whitten. Due to the NCAA's transition rules, they were not eligible for the 2021 FCS Playoffs.

== Preseason ==
=== Preseason polls ===
==== WAC Poll ====
The Western Athletic Conference coaches released their preseason poll on July 27, 2021. The Texans were picked to finish third in the conference. In addition, several Texans were selected to both the preseason WAC Offense and Defense teams.

Predicted finish	Team	Votes (1st place)
1	Sam Houston	20 (5)
2	Stephen F. Austin	16 (1)
3	Tarleton State	11
4	Lamar	8
5	Abilene Christian	5

- Note: Dixie State is not included since they are not playing a full WAC schedule due to previous non-conference game contracts. Dixie State players are eligible for individual awards.

==== Preseason All–WAC Team ====
Offense

- Tariq Bitson – Wide Receiver, GR
- Zachery Perry – Offensive Lineman, SR

Defense

- Ronnell Wilson – Linebacker, SR
- Devin Hafford – Defensive Back, SR

== Schedule ==
Date	Time	Opponent	Site	TV	Result	Attendance
September 4	6:00 p.m.	at Stephen F. Austin	Homer Bryce Stadium; Nacogdoches, TX	ESPN+	L 10–20	8,910
September 11	6:00 p.m.	Fort Lewis*	Memorial Stadium; Stephenville, TX	ESPN+	W 54–7	12,078
September 18	6:00 p.m.	vs. Southern Utah*	Globe Life Park; Arlington, TX	ESPN+	L 35–40	8,346
September 25	6:00 p.m.	New Mexico Highlands*	Memorial Stadium; Stephenville, TX	ESPN+	W 40–21	4,110
October 2	2:00 p.m.	at Eastern Kentucky	Roy Kidd Stadium; Richmond, KY	ESPN+	L 3–20	13,174
October 16	8:00 p.m.	at Dixie State	Greater Zion Stadium; St. George, UT	ESPN+	W 41–20	3,406
October 23	6:00 p.m.	Midwestern State*^{†}	Memorial Stadium; Stephenville, TX	ESPN+	W 17–14	16,216
October 30	6:00 p.m.	No. 1 Sam Houston	Memorial Stadium; Stephenville, TX	ESPN+	L 27–45	8,245
November 6	6:00 p.m.	Lamar	Memorial Stadium; Stephenville, TX	ESPN+	W 42–21	8,048
November 13	1:00 p.m.	at Abilene Christian	Wildcat Stadium; Abilene, TX	ESPN+	L 3–29	6,213
November 20	6:00 p.m.	Central Arkansas	Memorial Stadium; Stephenville, TX	ESPN+	W 24–3	6,528
*Non-conference game; ^{†}Homecoming; Rankings from STATS Poll released prior to the game; All times are in Central time
