= Tristin McCollum =

American football player (born 1999)

No. 27 – Las Vegas Raiders
- Position: Safety
- Roster status: Active

Personal information
- Born: May 3, 1999 (age 27); Galveston, Texas, U.S.
- Listed height: 6 ft 3 in (1.91 m)
- Listed weight: 195 lb (88 kg)

Career information
- High school: Ball (Galveston, Texas)
- College: Sam Houston (2017–2021)
- NFL draft: 2022: undrafted

Career history
- Houston Texans (2022)*; Philadelphia Eagles (2023–2024); Las Vegas Raiders (2025–present)
- * Offseason or practice squad member only

Awards and highlights
- Super Bowl champion (LIX)

Career NFL statistics as of 2025
- Total tackles: 53
- Pass deflections: 3
- Stats at Pro Football Reference

Tristin McCollum (born May 3, 1999) is an American professional football safety for the Las Vegas Raiders of the National Football League (NFL). He played college football for the Sam Houston Bearkats and was signed by the Houston Texans as an undrafted free agent after the 2022 NFL draft.

== Early life ==
McCollum was born on May 3, 1999. His father Cory Carr had a stint with the Chicago Bulls basketball team and his twin brother, Zyon, also played defensive back with him through college. They both attended Ball High School in Galveston, Texas, with Tristin being ranked a two-star recruit by 247Sports and the 40th-best player at his position in state. They both initially committed to play college football for the Utah Utes, but later re-committed to Sam Houston.

== College career ==
As a true freshman at Sam Houston State University in 2017, McCollum appeared in 13 games, one as a starter, and totaled 30 tackles while being mostly a special teams player. He started all 11 games for the team in 2018 and posted 48 tackles, 6.0 tackles-for-loss, 2.0 sacks and four pass breakups, being sixth on the team in tackles. He played 12 games, five as a starter, in the 2019 season, tallying 49 tackles, a sack and an interception. McCollum was part of the national championship team in the 2020–21 season, being named second-team All-Southland Conference while having 50 tackles and two interceptions. He repeated as a second-team all-conference selection as a senior in 2021. He finished his collegiate career with 229 total tackles, 12.0 tackles-for-loss, 4.0 sacks and three interceptions.

== Professional career ==
Pre-draft measurables
Height	Weight	Arm length	Hand span	Wingspan	40-yard dash	10-yard split	20-yard split	20-yard shuttle	Three-cone drill	Vertical jump	Broad jump
6 ft 1 1/8 in (1.86 m)	198 lb (90 kg)	30 3/8 in (0.77 m)	9 1/4 in (0.23 m)	6 ft 2 1/2 in (1.89 m)	4.48 s	1.53 s	2.58 s	4.03 s	6.72 s	37.5 in (0.95 m)	10 ft 10 in (3.30 m)
All values from Pro Day

=== Houston Texans ===
After going unselected in the 2022 NFL draft, McCollum was signed by the Houston Texans as an undrafted free agent. He was released on August 30 and subsequently re-signed to the practice squad. He was released from the practice squad on January 16, 2023.

=== Philadelphia Eagles ===
Two days after being released by the Texans, McCollum was signed to a reserve/future contract by the Philadelphia Eagles. He had an "outstanding" training camp and preseason, according to the Tampa Bay Times, but was waived on August 29 and re-signed to the practice squad the next day. He remained on the practice squad as the Eagles played against his twin brother, Zyon, a member of the Tampa Bay Buccaneers, in Week 3. Due to several injuries, the Eagles elevated McCollum to the active roster for their Week 4 game against the Washington Commanders. He appeared on 20 special teams snaps against the Commanders in his NFL debut. He signed a reserve/future contract on January 18, 2024. He won a Super Bowl championship when the Eagles defeated the Kansas City Chiefs 40–22 in Super Bowl LIX.

On August 27, 2025, McCollum was waived by the Eagles.

=== Las Vegas Raiders ===
On August 28, 2025, McCollum was claimed off waivers by the Las Vegas Raiders. On October 5, 2025, during the week 5 game against the Indianapolis Colts, McCollum collided with kicker Spencer Shrader on an extra-point attempt in the second quarter, which resulted in Shrader leaving the game with a season ending knee injury.

== NFL career statistics ==
Legend
	Won the Super Bowl
**Bold**	Career high

=== Regular season ===
Year	Team	Games		Tackles					Interceptions						Fumbles				
Year	Team	GP	GS	Cmb	Solo	Ast	Sck	TFL	Int	Yds	Avg	Lng	TD	PD	FF	Fum	FR	Yds	TD
2023	PHI	3	0	6	4	2	0.0	0	0	0	0.0	0	0	0	0	0	0	0	0
2024	PHI	14	**2**	**33**	**18**	**15**	0.0	0	0	0	0.0	0	0	**2**	0	0	0	0	0
2025	LV	**16**	0	14	11	3	0.0	**2**	0	0	0.0	0	0	1	0	0	0	0	0
Career		33	2	53	33	20	0.0	2	0	0	0.0	0	0	3	0	0	0	0	0

=== Postseason ===
Year	Team	Games		Tackles					Interceptions						Fumbles				
Year	Team	GP	GS	Cmb	Solo	Ast	Sck	TFL	Int	Yds	Avg	Lng	TD	PD	FF	Fum	FR	Yds	TD
2023	PHI	1	0	0	0	0	0.0	0	0	0	0.0	0	0	0	0	0	0	0	0
2024	PHI	**4**	0	**3**	0	**3**	0.0	0	0	0	0.0	0	0	0	0	0	0	0	0
Career		5	0	3	0	3	0.0	0	0	0	0.0	0	0	0	0	0	0	0	0

== Personal life ==
McCollum is the identical twin brother of Tampa Bay Buccaneers cornerback Zyon McCollum. He is also the son of former NBA player Cory Carr.
