= John Grass (American football) =

American football coach (born 1968)

Current position
- Title: Head coach
- Team: Samford
- Conference: SoCon
- Record: 2–6

Biographical details
- Born: February 29, 1968 (age 58); Ashville, Alabama, U.S.
- Education: Jacksonville State (1990)

Coaching career (HC unless noted)
- 1990–1992: Ashville HS (AL) (OC)
- 1993–1994: Eufaula HS (AL) (DC)
- 1995–1999: Ashville HS (AL)
- 2000–2001: Hoover HS (AL) (OC)
- 2002: Albertville HS (AL)
- 2003–2005: Moody HS (AL)
- 2006–2007: Spain Park HS (AL)
- 2008–2012: Oxford HS (AL)
- 2013: Jacksonville State (AHC/OC)
- 2014–2021: Jacksonville State
- 2022–2025: Clemson (analyst)
- 2026–present: Samford

Head coaching record
- Overall: 74–32 (college); 123–60 (high school)
- Tournaments: 5–6 (NCAA D–I playoffs)

Accomplishments and honors

Championships
- 6 OVC (2014–2018, 2020)

Awards
- 3× OVC Coach of the Year (2014–2016)

John Clyde Grass (born February 29, 1968) is an American football coach who is the head football coach at Samford University. He is the former head football coach at the Jacksonville State University, a position he held from 2014 until 2021. Grass joined the coaching staff of the Jacksonville State Gamecocks in 2013 as assistant head coach and offensive coordinator under Bill Clark. He previously coached high school football in the state of Alabama for over two decades.On December 3, 2025, Grass was named head coach of the Samford Bulldogs football team.

Grass was born in Ashville, Alabama. Since he was born on February 29 (commonly known as a "leap year baby"), his date of birth is recognized as February 28.

== Coaching career ==
Grass was named head coach of the Jacksonville State Gamecocks in 2014 after Bill Clark left to fill a coaching vacancy at UAB. During the 2014 regular season, the Gamecocks went 10–1 and received the No. 3 seed in NCAA Division I Football Championship playoffs. They won the Ohio Valley Conference outright for the first time.

During the 2015 season, the Gamecocks again won the OVC Championship outright. They narrowly lost to Auburn in an overtime game, and went on to play North Dakota St. Bison in the FCS National Championship game, where they lost 37–10. JSU's record finished at 13–2.

The 2016 season was also a successful season for Jacksonville State, where they again won the OVC Championship outright, and were granted the No. 3 seed for the FCS playoffs. Grass' third season as head coach finished during the second round of the FCS Playoffs, where they were upset by the Youngstown St. Penguins 40–24 at home.

Grass resigned as head coach at Jacksonville State on November 8, 2021 with two regular season games left to play. No reason was given, but it was a mutual decision by Grass and the administration. The following month, it was announced that Grass was hired by Clemson in an off-field analyst role.

In December 2025, Grass was hired as head coach at Samford.

== Education and family ==
Grass graduated from Jacksonville State in 1990 with a bachelor's degree in physical education. He received a master's of physical education from Jacksonville State in 1997 and an Ed.S. in administration in 2010 from Lincoln Memorial University.

Grass married his wife, Jada (née Arnold) in 1995. They have three children: Jud, Jules, and Jace Cannon.

== Head coaching record ==
=== College ===
Year	Team	Overall	Conference	Standing	Bowl/playoffs	TSN/STATS^{#}	Coaches^{°}
Jacksonville State Gamecocks (Ohio Valley Conference) (2014–2020)
2014	Jacksonville State	10–2	8–0	1st	L NCAA Division I Second Round	9	9
2015	Jacksonville State	13–2	8–0	1st	L NCAA Division I Championship	2	2
2016	Jacksonville State	10–2	7–0	1st	L NCAA Division I Second Round	6	6
2017	Jacksonville State	10–2	8–0	1st	L NCAA Division I Second Round	9	10
2018	Jacksonville State	9–4	7–1	1st	L NCAA Division I Second Round	10	13
2019	Jacksonville State	6–6	3–5	T–5th			
2020–21	Jacksonville State	10–3	6–1	1st	L NCAA Division I Quarterfinal	9	9
Jacksonville State Gamecocks (Western Athletic Conference) (2021)
2021	Jacksonville State	4–5 (Note: Resigned with two games remaining)	2–2				
Jacksonville State:		72–26	49–9				
Samford Bulldogs (Southern Conference) (2026–present)
2026	Samford	2–6	2–3				
Samford:		2–6	2–3				
Total:		74–32					
National championship Conference title Conference division title or championship game berth
