= 2021 Stephen F. Austin Lumberjacks football team =

American college football season

2021 Stephen F. Austin Lumberjacks football

FCS Playoffs, L 28–35 ^{OT} vs. Incarnate Word
- Conference: AQ7

Ranking
- STATS: No. 21
- FCS Coaches: No. 18
- Record: 8–4 (4–2 AQ7)
- Head coach: Colby Carthel (3rd season)
- Offensive coordinator: Matt Storm (3rd season)
- Offensive scheme: Spread
- Defensive coordinator: Scott Power (3rd season)
- Base defense: 4–3
- Home stadium: Homer Bryce Stadium

2021 Western Athletic Conference football standings
	Conf.			Overall
Team	W		L	W		L
No. 5 Sam Houston $^	5	–	0	11	–	1
No. 21 Stephen F. Austin ^	4	–	1	8	–	4
Abilene Christian	2	–	2	5	–	6
Tarleton State *	2	–	3	6	–	5
Dixie State *	0	–	3	1	–	10
Lamar	0	–	4	1	–	9
$ – Conference champion; ^ – FCS playoff participant; * – Ineligible for FCS playoffs due to transition from Division II; Rankings from STATS Poll

2021 WAC–ASUN Challenge football standings
	Conf.			Overall
Team	W		L	W		L
No. 5 Sam Houston $^	6	–	0	11	–	1
No. 21 Stephen F. Austin ^	4	–	2	8	–	4
Eastern Kentucky	4	–	2	7	–	4
Central Arkansas	3	–	3	5	–	6
Jacksonville State	3	–	3	5	–	6
Abilene Christian	1	–	5	5	–	6
Lamar	0	–	6	1	–	9
$ – Conference champion; ^ – FCS playoff participant; Rankings from STATS Poll

The 2021 Stephen F. Austin Lumberjacks football team represented Stephen F. Austin State University in the 2021 NCAA Division I FCS football season as a member of the Western Athletic Conference (WAC). The Lumberjacks were led by third-year head coach Colby Carthel and played their home games at Homer Bryce Stadium.

The Western Athletic Conference and ASUN Conference announced the formation of the WAC-ASUN Challenge (AQ7) for the 2021 season on February 23, 2021. The Challenge included the four fully qualified Division I (FCS) members of the WAC (Abilene Christian, Lamar, Sam Houston, and Stephen F. Austin) and Central Arkansas, Eastern Kentucky, and Jacksonville State of the ASUN Conference. The winner of the challenge received an auto-bid to the NCAA Division I FCS football playoffs.

== Preseason ==
=== Preseason polls ===
==== WAC Poll ====
The Western Athletic Conference coaches released their preseason poll on July 27, 2021. The Lumberjacks were picked to finish second in the conference. In addition, several Lumberjacks were selected to both the preseason WAC Offense and Defense teams.

Predicted finish	Team	Votes (1st place)
1	Sam Houston	20 (5)
2	Stephen F. Austin	16 (1)
3	Tarleton State	11
4	Lamar	8
5	Abilene Christian	5

- Note: Dixie State is not included since they are not playing a full WAC schedule due to previous non-conference game contracts. Dixie State players are eligible for individual rewards.

==== Preseason All–WAC Team ====
Offense

- Xavier Gipson – Wide Receiver, SO
- Zach Ingram – Offensive Lineman, SR

Defense

- B. J. Thompson – Defensive Lineman, JR
- Brevin Randle – Linebacker, SO

==== AQ7 Poll ====
The AQ7 coaches also released their preseason poll on July 27, 2021. The Lumberjacks were picked to finish fourth in the ASUN-WAC Challenge.

Predicted finish	Team	Votes (1st place)
1	Sam Houston	49 (7)
2	Central Arkansas	40
3	Jacksonville State	37
4	Stephen F. Austin	27
5	Eastern Kentucky	20
6	Abilene Christian	15
7	Lamar	8

== Schedule ==
Date	Time	Opponent	Rank	Site	TV	Result	Attendance
September 4	6:00 p.m.	Tarleton State		Homer Bryce Stadium; Nacogdoches, TX	ESPN+	W 20–10	8,910
September 11	6:00 p.m.	at Texas Tech*		Jones AT&T Stadium; Lubbock, TX	ESPN+	L 22–28	55,271
September 18	6:00 p.m.	Mississippi Valley State*		Homer Bryce Stadium; Nacogdoches, TX	ESPN+	W 58–13	10,035
September 25	6:00 p.m.	Lincoln (CA)*		Homer Bryce Stadium; Nacogdoches, TX	ESPN+	W 61–13	5,346
October 2	4:00 p.m.	vs. No. 1 Sam Houston		NRG Stadium; Houston, TX (Battle of the Piney Woods)	ESPN+	L 20–21	25,007
October 9	3:00 p.m.	at No. 24 Jacksonville State	No. 23	Burgess–Snow Field at JSU Stadium; Jacksonville, AL (WAC/ASUN Challenge)	ESPN+	L 24–28	16,355
October 23	8:00 p.m.	at Dixie State		Greater Zion Stadium; St. George, UT	ESPN+	W 37–20	4,442
October 30	4:00 p.m.	Abilene Christian		Homer Bryce Stadium; Nacogdoches, TX	ESPN+	W 41–27	9,817
November 6	4:00 p.m.	No. 25 Eastern Kentucky		Homer Bryce Stadium; Nacogdoches, TX (WAC/ASUN Challenge)	ESPN+	W 31–17	7,637
November 13	4:00 p.m.	at Central Arkansas		Estes Stadium; Conway, AR (WAC/ASUN Challenge)	ESPN+	W 27–14	4,115
November 20	4:00 p.m.	at Lamar	No. 22	Provost Umphrey Stadium; Beaumont, TX	ESPN+	W 42–6	5,411
November 27	2:00 p.m.	at No. 13 Incarnate Word*	No. 20	Gayle and Tom Benson Stadium; San Antonio, TX (NCAA Division I First Round)	ESPN+	L 28–35 ^{OT}	3,448
*Non-conference game; Rankings from STATS Poll released prior to the game; All times are in Central time
