= Zyon McCollum =

American football player (born 1999)

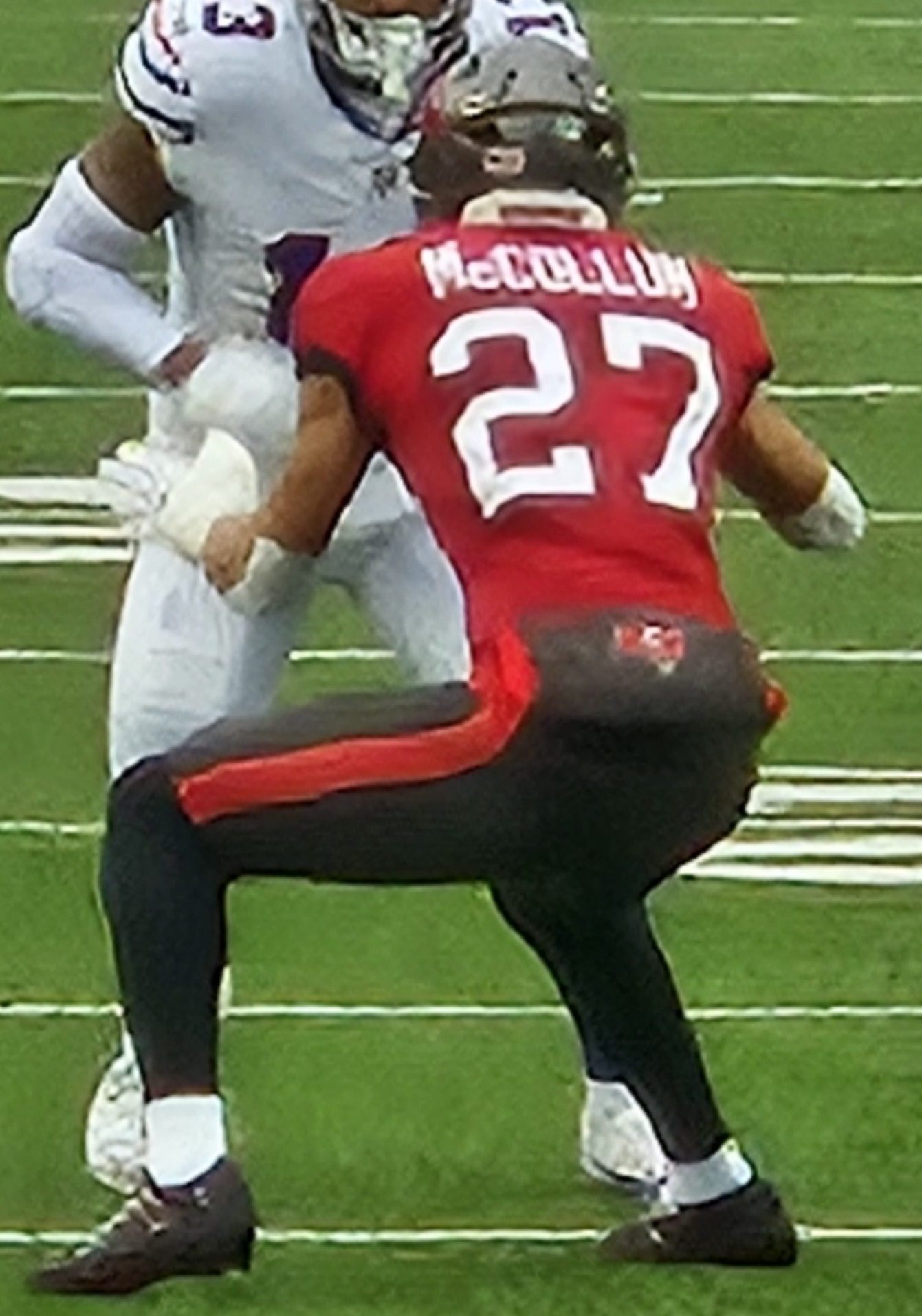
- McCollum in 2025

No. 27 – Tampa Bay Buccaneers
- Position: Cornerback
- Roster status: Active

Personal information
- Born: May 3, 1999 (age 27); Galveston, Texas, U.S.
- Listed height: 6 ft 2 in (1.88 m)
- Listed weight: 199 lb (90 kg)

Career information
- High school: Ball (Galveston)
- College: Sam Houston State (2017–2021)
- NFL draft: 2022: 5th round, 157th overall pick

Career history
- Tampa Bay Buccaneers (2022–present)

Awards and highlights
- FCS national champion (2020); First-team All-WAC (2021); 2× First-team All-Southland (2018, 2020); Second-team All-Southland (2019)

Career NFL statistics as of Week 7, 2026
- Total tackles: 268
- Forced fumbles: 2
- Fumble recoveries: 2
- Pass deflections: 41
- Interceptions: 4
- Stats at Pro Football Reference

Zyon McCollum (born May 3, 1999) is an American professional football cornerback for the Tampa Bay Buccaneers of the National Football League (NFL). He played college football for the Sam Houston State Bearkats before being selected by the Buccaneers in the fifth round of the 2022 NFL draft.

== Early life ==
McCollum grew up in Galveston, Texas and attended Ball High School. He initially committed to play college football at Utah alongside his twin brother, Tristin. However, citing a desire to play closer to home, he and his brother reneged on their commitment and signed papers of intent to play at Sam Houston State.

== College career ==
McCollum became a starter at cornerback during his freshman season. He was named first-team All-Southland Conference after recording 44 tackles with eight passes broken up and three interceptions in his sophomore season. McCollum was named second-team All-Conference as a junior after intercepting three passes and breaking up 11 despite missing the final three games of the season due injury. He had 46 tackles and was a first-team All-Southland during his senior season, which was shortened and played in the spring of 2021 due to the COVID-19 pandemic in the United States, as the Bearkats won the 2021 NCAA Division I Football Championship Game. McCollum decided to utilize the extra year of eligibility granted to college athletes who played in the 2020 season due to the coronavirus pandemic and return to Sam Houston State for a fifth season. In his final season, he had 50 tackles, two tackles for loss, three interceptions, and eight passes defended and was named first-team All-Western Athletic Conference.

== Professional career ==
=== Pre-draft ===
NFL.com media analyst Daniel Jeremiah had him ranked as the ninth best cornerback (78th overall) in the draft. Scouts Inc. listed McCollum as the 11th best cornerback prospect (88th overall) on their big board. NFL draft analyst Kevin Hanson of Sports Illustrated had McCollum ranked as the 14th best cornerback available in the draft. Josh Edwards of CBSSports.com had him ranked as the 15th best cornerback (107th overall) available in the draft. Cory Giddings of Bleacher Report ranked McCollum as the 21st best cornerback prospect (161st overall) in the draft. The majority of NFL draft analysts projected him to be selected in the third or fourth round of the 2022 NFL draft.

External videos
- Zyon McCollum runs 4.33s 40-yard dash

Pre-draft measurables
Height	Weight	Arm length	Hand span	Wingspan	40-yard dash	10-yard split	20-yard split	20-yard shuttle	Three-cone drill	Vertical jump	Broad jump	Bench press
6 ft 2 1/8 in (1.88 m)	199 lb (90 kg)	30 3/4 in (0.78 m)	9 in (0.23 m)	6 ft 1 3/4 in (1.87 m)	4.33 s	1.52 s	2.51 s	3.94 s	6.48 s	39.5 in (1.00 m)	11 ft 0 in (3.35 m)	15 reps
All values from NFL Combine/Pro Day

=== 2022 ===
The Tampa Bay Buccaneers selected McCollum in the fifth round (157th overall) of the 2022 NFL draft. The Buccaneers orchestrated a trade with the Jacksonville Jaguars in order to immediately draft McCollum, agreeing to trade a fourth-round pick (121st overall) in the 2023 NFL draft to the Jaguars in exchange for their fifth (157th overall) and seventh-round (235th overall) selections in the 2022 NFL draft. He was the 22nd cornerback selected in 2022.

External videos
- Bucs select Zyon McCollum No. 157
- Bucs call 5th round pick Zyon McCollum

On May 12, 2022, the Tampa Bay Buccaneers signed McCollum to a four–year, $3.98 million rookie contract that includes an initial signing bonus of $321,732.

Throughout training camp, he competed to earn a role as a backup cornerback against Ross Cockrell, Dee Delaney, and Rashard Robinson. On August 18, 2022, McCollum suffered a hamstring injury during practice and would be sidelined for the remaining two preseason games. Head coach Todd Bowles named him a backup and listed him as the fourth cornerback on the depth chart to begin the season, behind Jamel Dean, Carlton Davis, and Sean Murphy-Bunting.

He began his rookie season inactive for the first four games (weeks 1–4) due to a hamstring injury he suffered during practice in training camp. On October 9, 2022, McCollum made his professional regular season debut and recorded two solo tackles as the Buccaneers defeated the Atlanta Falcons 21–15. On October 23, 2022, McCollum earned his first career start after injuries to Carlton Davis and Sean Murphy-Bunting. He recorded four combined tackles (three solo) during a 3–21 loss at the Carolina Panthers. The following week, he earned his second start in-a-row and set a season-high with five combined tackles (four solo) and made the first pass deflection of his career as the Buccaneers lost 22–27 to the Baltimore Ravens. He finished his rookie season in 2022 with 24 combined tackles (18 solo) and one pass defended in 13 games and three starts. He received an overall grade of 46.3 from Pro Football Focus as a rookie in 2022.

=== 2023 ===
He entered training camp slated as a backup. Head coach Todd Bowles named him a backup and listed him as the third cornerback on the depth chart to begin the season, behind returning starters Carlton Davis and Jamel Dean.

In week 12, he set a new season-high with nine combined tackles (six solo) during a 20–27 loss at the Indianapolis Colts. In week 14, McCollum recorded nine combined tackles (six solo) and set a season-high with two pass deflections during a 29–25 victory at the Atlanta Falcons. He finished the season with a total of 68 combined tackles (49 solo), nine pass deflections, and two forced fumbles in 17 games and nine starts. He received an overall grade of 73.3 from Pro Football Focus in 2023.

The Tampa Bay Buccaneers finished the 2023 NFL season with a 9–8 record, claiming first in the NFC South to clinch a playoff berth. On January 21, 2024, McCollum recorded six combined tackles (five solo) as the Buccaneers lost 23–31 at the Detroit Lions in the divisional round.

=== 2024 ===
McCollum entered training camp as a possible candidate to replace Carlton Davis as a starting cornerback following his departure, but had to earn the role in a competition against Bryce Hall, Tavierre Thomas, Josh Hayes, and Keenan Isaac. Head coach Todd Bowles named him the No. 2 starting cornerback to begin the season and paired him with Jamel Dean.

On September 15, 2024, McCollum made six combined tackles (five solo), set a career-high with four pass deflections, and made his first career interception on a pass by Jared Goff to wide receiver Jameson Williams during a 20–16 victory at the Detroit Lions. In Week 5, he set a season-high with ten combined tackles (seven solo) and made two pass deflections as the Buccaneers lost in overtime 30–36 at the Atlanta Falcons. He started all 17 games throughout the 2024 NFL season and finished with a total of 82 combined tackles (55 solo), a career-high 17 pass deflections, two interceptions, and a fumble recovery. He received an overall grade of 69.5 from Pro Football Focus, which ranked 54th amongst 222 qualifying cornerbacks in 2024.

=== 2025 ===
On September 5, 2025, McCollum signed a three-year, $48 million contract extension with $35.4 million guaranteed. He made 13 starts for Tampa Bay during the year, recording one interception, six pass deflections, and 65 combined tackles. On December 15, McCollum was placed on season-ending injured reserve due to a hip injury suffered in Week 15 against the Atlanta Falcons.

== NFL career statistics ==
Legend
**Bold**	Career high

=== Regular season ===
Year	Team	Games		Tackles					Interceptions						Fumbles				
Year	Team	GP	GS	Cmb	Solo	Ast	Sck	TFL	Int	Yds	Avg	Lng	TD	PD	FF	Fum	FR	Yds	TD
2022	TB	13	3	24	18	6	0.0	0	0	0	0.0	0	0	1	0	0	0	0	0
2023	TB	17	9	68	49	19	0.0	**1**	0	0	0.0	0	0	9	**2**	0	0	0	0
2024	TB	17	17	**82**	**55**	**27**	0.0	**1**	**2**	4	2.0	4	0	**17**	0	0	**1**	0	0
2025	TB	13	13	65	45	20	0.0	**1**	1	**19**	**19.0**	**19**	0	6	0	0	0	0	0
Career		60	42	239	167	72	0.0	3	3	23	7.7	19	0	33	2	0	1	0	0

=== Postseason ===
Year	Team	Games		Tackles					Interceptions						Fumbles				
Year	Team	GP	GS	Cmb	Solo	Ast	Sck	TFL	Int	Yds	Avg	Lng	TD	PD	FF	Fum	FR	Yds	TD
2022	TB	1	0	1	1	0	0.0	0	0	0	0.0	0	0	0	0	0	0	0	0
2023	TB	2	0	**9**	**8**	**1**	0.0	0	0	0	0.0	0	0	0	0	0	0	0	0
2024	TB	1	1	3	2	**1**	0.0	**1**	0	0	0.0	0	0	**1**	0	0	0	0	0
Career		4	1	13	11	2	0.0	1	0	0	0.0	0	0	1	0	0	0	0	0

== Personal life ==
McCollum is the identical twin brother of NFL safety Tristin McCollum who currently plays for the Las Vegas Raiders. He is also the son of former NBA player Cory Carr.
