= 2021 Missouri Valley Football Conference season =

American college football conference season

- League: NCAA Division I Football Championship Subdivision
- Sport: Football
- Duration: September 1, 2022 through January 8, 2023
- Teams: 11

2022 NFL Draft
- Top draft pick: Trevor Penning, OT, Northern Iowa
- Picked by: New Orleans Saints (round 1, pick 19)

Regular season
- Champion Playoff Participants: North Dakota State Missouri State; Southern Illinois; South Dakota; South Dakota State; Northern Iowa

Football seasons
- 2020 2022

2021 Missouri Valley Football Conference standings
	Conf.			Overall
Team	W		L	W		L
No. 1 North Dakota State $^	7	–	1	14	–	1
No. 14 Missouri State ^	6	–	2	8	–	4
No. 16 Southern Illinois ^	5	–	3	8	–	5
No. 18 South Dakota ^	5	–	3	7	–	5
No. 4 South Dakota State ^	5	–	3	11	–	4
No. 23 Northern Iowa ^	4	–	4	6	–	6
Indiana State	3	–	5	5	–	6
North Dakota	3	–	5	5	–	6
Western Illinois	2	–	6	2	–	9
Illinois State	2	–	6	4	–	7
Youngstown State	2	–	6	3	–	7
$ – Conference champion; ^ – FCS playoff participant; Rankings from STATS Poll

The 2021 Missouri Valley Football Conference football season was the 36th season of college football play for the Missouri Valley Football Conference and part of the 2021 NCAA Division I FCS football season. This was the MVFC's 2nd straight season with 11 teams.
North Dakota State made it to the National Championship and won their 9th FCS title in program history. South Dakota State made the playoffs unseeded, and won their way into the semifinals where they lost to 8th seeded Montana State. Southern Illinois also made it to the playoffs, and beat fellow MVFC member South Dakota in the first round, but would fall to eventual champion North Dakota State in the second round. Northern Iowa also made it to the playoffs, but lost to Eastern Washington in the first round.

== Preseason ==
=== MVFC Media Day ===
==== Preseason Poll ====
The annual preseason poll; voted on by conference coaches, athletic directors, and media members.

Predicted finish	Team	Points (1st place votes)
1	South Dakota State	454 (24)
2	North Dakota State	435 (18)
3	North Dakota	357
4	Southern Illinois	345
5	Northern Iowa	311 (1)
6	Missouri State	256
7	Illinois State	196
8	South Dakota	163
9	Youngstown State	126
10	Indiana State	112
11	Western Illinois	83

=== Preseason Awards ===
==== Individual awards ====
Award	Player	School	Position	Year
First Team Offense	Tommy Schuster	North Dakota	QB	RS So.
First Team Offense	Pierre Strong Jr.	South Dakota State	RB	Jr.
First Team Offense	Otis Weah	North Dakota	RB	RS Jr.
First Team Offense	Hunter Luepke	North Dakota State	FB	Jr.
First Team Offense	Zach Heins	South Dakota State	TE	So.
First Team Offense	Avante Cox Jr.	Southern Illinois	WR	Jr.
First Team Offense	Dennis Houston	Western Illinois	WR	Sr.
First Team Offense	Christian Watson	North Dakota State	WR	Sr.
First Team Offense	ZeVeyon Furcron	Southern Illinois	OL	Sr.
First Team Offense	Garret Greenfield	South Dakota State	OL	So.
First Team Offense	Cody Mauch	North Dakota State	OL	Sr.
First Team Offense	Cordell Volson	North Dakota State	OL	Sr.
First Team Offense	Matt Waletzko	North Dakota	OL	Sr.
First Team Offense	Javon Williams Jr.	Southern Illinois	AP	So.
First Team Defense	Jordan Berner	Southern Illinois	DL	Sr.
First Team Defense	Jared Brinkman	Northern Iowa	DL	GS
First Team Defense	Caleb Sanders	South Dakota State	DL	Jr.
First Team Defense	Spencer Waege	North Dakota State	DL	Sr.
First Team Defense	Logan Backhaus	South Dakota State	LB	Sr.
First Team Defense	Spencer Cuvelier	Northern Iowa	LB	Sr.
First Team Defense	Grant Dixon	Youngstown State	LB	Sr.
First Team Defense	James Kaczor	North Dakota State	LB	Sr.
First Team Defense	Montrae Braswell	Missouri State	DB	So.
First Team Defense	Qua Brown	Southern Illinois	DB	Sr.
First Team Defense	James Caesar	Southern Illinois	DB	Sr.
First Team Defense	Don Gardner	South Dakota State	DB	Sr.
First Team Defense	Michael Tutsie	North Dakota State	DB	Sr.
First Team Special Teams	Brady Schutt	South Dakota	P	Sr.
First Team Special Teams	Matthew Cook	Northern Iowa	PK	Jr.
First Team Special Teams	Dalton Godfrey	South Dakota	LS	Jr.
First Team Special Teams	Christian Watson	North Dakota State	RS	Sr.

Award	Player	School	Position	Year
Second Team Offense	Stone Labanowitz	Southern Illinois	QB	Sr.
Second Team Offense	Isaiah Davis	South Dakota State	RB	Fr.
Second Team Offense	Jaleel McLaughlin	Youngstown State	RB	Sr.
Second Team Offense	Jacob Garrett	Southern Illinois	FB	Jr.
Second Team Offense	Noah Gindorff	North Dakota State	TE	Sr.
Second Team Offense	Jaxon Janke	South Dakota State	WR	So.
Second Team Offense	Tony Tate	Western Illinois	WR	Sr.
Second Team Offense	Caleb Vander Esch	South Dakota	WR	Sr.
Second Team Offense	Landon Bebee	Missouri State	OL	Jr.
Second Team Offense	Dan Becker	Youngstown State	OL	Sr.
Second Team Offense	Wes Genant	South Dakota State	OL	Sr.
Second Team Offense	Mason McCormick	South Dakota State	OL	So.
Second Team Offense	Trevor Penning	Northern Iowa	OL	Sr.
Second Team Offense	Deion McShane	Northern Iowa	AP	Sr.
Second Team Defense	Kevin Ellis	Missouri State	DL	Sr.
Second Team Defense	Eric Johnson	Missouri State	DL	Sr.
Second Team Defense	Anthony Knighton	Southern Illinois	DL	Sr.
Second Team Defense	Eli Mostaert	North Dakota State	DL	So.
Second Team Defense	Devon Krzanowski	North Dakota	LB	Sr.
Second Team Defense	Brock Mogensen	South Dakota	LB	So.
Second Team Defense	Bryson Strong Jr.	Southern Illinois	LB	Jr.
Second Team Defense	Tylar Wiltz	Missouri State	LB	Sr.
Second Team Defense	Omar Brown	Northern Iowa	DB	Jr.
Second Team Defense	Austin Evans	Northern Iowa	DB	GS
Second Team Defense	Evan Holm	North Dakota	DB	Sr.
Second Team Defense	Zaire Jones	Youngstown State	DB	Sr.
Second Team Defense	Kyriq McDonald	Missouri State	DB	Sr.
Second Team Special Teams	Jack Colquhoun	Southern Illinois	P	Sr.
Second Team Special Teams	Jose Pizano	Missouri State	PK	Jr.
Second Team Special Teams	Bradey Sorenson	South Dakota State	LS	Sr.
Second Team Special Teams	Tony Tate	Western Illinois	RS	Sr.

Award	Player	School	Position	Year
Honorable Mention Offense	Will McElvain	Northern Iowa	QB	Jr.
Honorable Mention Offense	Connor Sampson	Western Illinois	QB	Sr.
Honorable Mention Offense	Tyler Hoosman	Northern Iowa	RB	Sr.
Honorable Mention Offense	Tim McCloyn	Illinois State	FB	Sr.
Honorable Mention Offense	Josh Babicz	North Dakota State	TE	Sr.
Honorable Mention Offense	Dante Hendrix	Indiana State	WR	RS Jr.
Honorable Mention Offense	Isaiah Weston	Northern Iowa	WR	Sr.
Honorable Mention Offense	Isaiah Edwards	Indiana State	OL	RS Sr.
Honorable Mention Offense	Mason Scheidegger	South Dakota	OL	Sr.
Honorable Mention Offense	William Waddell	Western Illinois	OL	Sr.
Honorable Mention Offense	Christian Turner	Youngstown State	AP	Sr.
Honorable Mention Defense	James Jackson	Youngstown State	DL	Sr.
Honorable Mention Defense	Jacob Matthew	South Dakota	DL	Sr.
Honorable Mention Defense	Inoke Moala	Indiana State	DL	RS Sr.
Honorable Mention Defense	Reece Winkelman	South Dakota State	DL	Jr.
Honorable Mention Defense	Jack Cochrane	South Dakota	LB	Sr.
Honorable Mention Defense	Jaxson Turner	North Dakota	LB	Sr.
Honorable Mention Defense	Jordan Canady	North Dakota	DB	Sr.
Honorable Mention Defense	Myles Harden	South Dakota	DB	Fr.
Honorable Mention Defense	Benny Sapp III	Northern Iowa	DB	Sr.
Honorable Mention Special Teams	Adam Fellner	Western Illinois	P	Sr.
Honorable Mention Special Teams	Nico Gualdoni	Southern Illinois	PK	Sr.
Honorable Mention Special Teams	Dan Heilbron	Southern Illinois	LS	Jr.
Honorable Mention Special Teams	Luke Skokna	North Dakota	RS	Jr.

== Rankings ==
Legend
	Improvement in ranking
	Drop in ranking
	Not ranked previous week
	No change in ranking from previous week
RV	Received votes but were not ranked in Top 25 of poll
т	Tied with team above or below also with this symbol

		Pre	Wk 1	Wk 2	Wk 3	Wk 4	Wk 5	Wk 6	Wk 7	Wk 8	Wk 9	Wk 10	Wk 11	Wk 12	Final
Illinois State	STATS Perform	RV	RV												
Illinois State	AFCA Coaches		RV		RV	RV									
Indiana State	STATS Perform														
Indiana State	AFCA Coaches														
Missouri State	STATS Perform	24	23	17	18	16	15	20	17	17	17	16	14	12	14
Missouri State	AFCA Coaches	RV	25	19	18	16	16	23	18	20	20	14	14	10	14
North Dakota	STATS Perform	8	9	11	10	10	13	22	RV	RV			RV		
North Dakota	AFCA Coaches	7	7	14	13	11	15	24	RV	RV					
North Dakota State	STATS Perform	4	5	5	5	5	5	3	3	2	2	5	4	3	1
North Dakota State	AFCA Coaches	3	4	4	5	5	5	3	3	2	2	6	4	3	1
Northern Iowa	STATS Perform	21	21	18	17	15	16	16	20	16	13	20	RV	RV	23
Northern Iowa	AFCA Coaches	16	15	15	14	13	12	17	24	17	15	24	RV	25	25
South Dakota	STATS Perform				RV	RV	RV	21	15	21	23	19	16	17	18
South Dakota	AFCA Coaches		RV	RV	RV		RV								
South Dakota State	STATS Perform	3	2	2	2	2	2	7	6	10	9	4	12	11	4
South Dakota State	AFCA Coaches	4	3	3	3	3	3	8	7	13	12	7	13	11	5
Southern Illinois	STATS Perform	7	8	8	7	7	8	4	4	3	7	15	17	21	16
Southern Illinois	AFCA Coaches	10	9	9т	8	7	7	4	4	3	9	16	15	23	17
Western Illinois	STATS Perform														
Western Illinois	AFCA Coaches														
Youngstown State	STATS Perform							RV	RV						
Youngstown State	AFCA Coaches	RV	RV												

== Schedule ==
Index to colors and formatting
MVFC member won
MVFC member lost
MVFC teams in **bold**

All times Central time.

† denotes Homecoming game
^ denotes AP Poll ranking for FBS teams

=== Regular season schedule ===
==== Week 0 ====
Date	Time	Visiting team	Home team	Site	TV	Result	Attendance	Ref.
August 28	6:00 PM	Eastern Illinois	**Indiana State**	Memorial Stadium • Terre Haute, IN	ESPN+	**W** 26–21	5,540	
^{#}Rankings from Stats Perform. All times are in Central Time.

==== Week 1 ====
Date	Time	Visiting team	Home team	Site	TV	Result	Attendance	Ref.
September 2	6:30 PM	No. 7 **Southern Illinois**	Southeast Missouri State	Houck Stadium • Cape Girardeau, MO	ESPN+	**W** 47–21	4,075	
September 2	7:00 PM	**Western Illinois**	Ball State	Scheumann Stadium • Muncie, IN	ESPN+	**L** 21–31	13,149	
September 2	7:00 PM	Incarnate Word	**Youngstown State**	Stambaugh Stadium • Youngstown, OH	ESPN+	**W** 44–41^{OT}	8,637	
September 3	7:00 PM	**South Dakota**	Kansas	David Booth Kansas Memorial Stadium • Lawrence, KS	ESPN+	**L** 14–17	26,103	
September 3	8:00 PM	No. 3 **South Dakota State**	Colorado State	Canvas Stadium • Fort Collins, CO	FS1	**W** 42–23	32,327	
September 4	2:00 PM	No. 8 **North Dakota**	Idaho State	Holt Arena • Pocatello, ID	ESPN+	**W** 35–14	4,667	
September 4	2:30 PM	Albany	No. 4 **North Dakota State**	Fargodome • Fargo, ND	ESPN+	**W** 28–6	15,156	
September 4	3:30 PM	No. 21 **Northern Iowa**	No. 7^ Iowa State	Jack Trice Stadium • Ames, IA	ESPN+	**L** 10–16	61,500	
September 4	6:00 PM	No. 24 **Missouri State**	Oklahoma State	Boone Pickens Stadium • Stillwater, OK	ESPN+	**L** 16–23	50,807	
September 4	6:30 PM	Butler	**Illinois State**	Hancock Stadium • Normal, IL	ESPN3	**W** 49–7	8,148	
^{#}Rankings from Stats Perform. All times are in Central Time.

Date	Bye Week
September 4	Indiana State

==== Week 2 ====
Date	Time	Visiting team	Home team	Site	TV	Result	Attendance	Ref.
September 10	8:00 PM	No. 9 **North Dakota**	Utah State	Maverik Stadium • Logan, UT	CBSSN	**L** 24–48	18,124	
September 11	12:00 PM	**Indiana State**	Northwestern	Ryan Field • Evanston, IL	BTN	**L** 6–24	26,181	
September 11	11:00 AM	**Youngstown State**	Michigan State	Spartan Stadium • East Lancing, MI	BTN	**L** 14–42	70,103	
September 11	1:00 PM	Northern Arizona	**South Dakota**	DakotaDome • Vermillion, SD		**W** 34–7	5,247	
September 11	2:30 PM	Valparaiso	No. 5 **North Dakota State**	Fargodome • Fargo, ND	ESPN+	**W** 64–0	15,118	
September 11	4:00 PM	**Illinois State**	Western Michigan	Waldo Stadium • Kalamazoo, MI	ESPN3	**L** 0–28	18,122	
September 11	6:00 PM	No. 8 **Southern Illinois**	Kansas State	Bill Snyder Family Football Stadium • Manhattan, KS	ESPN+	**L** 23–31	47,628	
September 11	6:00 PM	Lindenwood	No. 2 **South Dakota State**	Dana J. Dykhouse Stadium • Brookings, SD	ESPN3	**W** 52–7	15,162	
September 11	7:00 PM	No. 19 Central Arkansas	No. 23 **Missouri State**	Robert W. Plaster Stadium • Springfield, MO	ESPN+	**W** 43–34	11,247	
September 11	7:00 PM	**Western Illinois**	No. 4 Montana	Washington-Grizzly Stadium • Missoula, MT	ESPN+	**L** 7–42	25,238	
September 11	8:00 PM	No. 21 **Northern Iowa**	Sacramento State	Hornet Stadium • Sacramento, CA	ESPN+	**W** 34–16	8,067	
^{#}Rankings from Stats Perform. All times are in Central Time.

==== Week 3 ====
Date	Time	Visiting team	Home team	Site	TV	Result	Attendance	Ref.
September 18	3:00 PM	No. 7 Eastern Washington	**Western Illinois**	Hanson Field • Macomb, IL	ESPN+	**L** 56–62	5,385	
September 18	4:00 PM	St. Thomas	No. 18 **Northern Iowa**	UNI-Dome • Cedar Falls, IA	ESPN3	**W** 44–3	5,124	
September 18	4:00 PM	Drake	No. 11 **North Dakota**	Alerus Center • Grand Forks, ND	ESPN+	**W** 38–0	10,143	
September 18	5:00 PM	No. 5 **North Dakota State**	Towson	Johnny Unitas Stadium • Towson, MD	FloSports	**W** 35–7	9,109	
September 18	6:00 PM	Dayton	No. 8 **Southern Illinois**	Saluki Stadium • Carbondale, IL	ESPN+	**W** 55–3	7,338	
September 18	6:00 PM	**Illinois State**	Eastern Illinois	O'Brien Field • Charleston, IL (Mid-America Classic)	ESPN+	**W** 31–24	6,424	
September 18	7:00 PM	**South Dakota**	Cal Poly	Alex G. Spanos Stadium • San Luis Obispo, CA		**W** 48–14	11,075	
September 18	7:00 PM	**Indiana State**	Eastern Kentucky	Roy Kidd Stadium • Richmond, KY	ESPN+	**W** 23–21	4,550	
^{#}Rankings from Stats Perform. All times are in Central Time.

Date	Bye Week	
September 18	No. 17 Missouri State	No. 2 South Dakota State

==== Week 4 ====
Date	Time	Visiting team	Home team	Site	TV	Result	Attendance	Ref.
September 25	12:00 PM	No. 2 **South Dakota State**	**Indiana State**	Memorial Stadium • Terre Haute, IN	ESPN+	**SDSU** 44–0	6,652	
September 25	2:00 PM	**Illinois State**	No. 7 **Southern Illinois**	Saluki Stadium • Carbondale, IL	ESPN+	**SIU** 35–17	8,618	
September 25	6:00 PM	**Western Illinois**	**Youngstown State**	Stambaugh Stadium • Youngstown, OH	ESPN3	**YSU** 38–35	13,751	
September 25	7:00 PM	**South Dakota**	No. 18 **Missouri State**	Robert W. Plaster Stadium • Springfield, MO	ESPN3	**MOST** 31–23	12,738	
^{#}Rankings from Stats Perform. All times are in Central Time.

Date	Bye Week		
September 25	No. 5 North Dakota State	No. 17 Northern Iowa	No. 10 North Dakota

==== Week 5 ====
Date	Time	Visiting team	Home team	Site	TV	Result	Attendance	Ref.
October 2	1:00 PM	No. 16 **Missouri State**	**Illinois State**	Hancock Stadium • Normal, IL	ESPN+	**MOST** 41–20	-	
October 2	2:00 PM	No. 5 **North Dakota State**	No. 10 **North Dakota**	Alerus Center • Grand Forks, ND	ESPN+	**NDSU** 16–10	12,846	
October 2	2:00 PM	**Indiana State**	**South Dakota**	DakotaDome • Vermillion, SD		**USD** 38–10	6,267	
October 2	3:00 PM	No. 7 **Southern Illinois**	**Western Illinois**	Hanson Field • Macomb, IL	ESPN+	**SIU** 31–30^{OT}	4,107	
October 2	4:00 PM	**Youngstown State**	No. 15 **Northern Iowa**	UNI-Dome • Cedar Falls, IA		**UNI** 34–7	8,771	
October 2	6:00 PM	Dixie State	No. 2 **South Dakota State**	Dana J. Dykhouse Stadium • Brookings, SD	ESPN+	**W** 55–7	14,427	
^{#}Rankings from Stats Perform. All times are in Central Time.

==== Week 6 ====
Date	Time	Visiting team	Home team	Site	TV	Result	Attendance	Ref.
October 9	1:00 PM	No. 16 **Northern Iowa**	No. 5 **North Dakota State**†	Fargodome • Fargo, ND	ESPN+	**NDSU** 34–20	18,536	
October 9	1:00 PM	No. 16 **Missouri State**	**Youngstown State**	Stambaugh Stadium • Youngstown, OH	ESPN+	**YSU** 41–33	12,444	
October 9	2:00 PM	No. 8 **Southern Illinois**	No. 2 **South Dakota State**	Dana J. Dykhouse Stadium • Brookings, SD	ESPN+	**SIU** 42–41^{OT}	12,216	
October 9	2:00 PM	No. 13 **North Dakota**	**South Dakota**	DakotaDome • Vermillion, SD (Sitting Bull Trophy)	ESPN+	**USD** 20–13	5,304	
October 9	1:00 PM	**Western Illinois**	**Indiana State**	Memorial Stadium • Terre Haute, IN	ESPN+	**INST** 37–27	3,943	
^{#}Rankings from Stats Perform. All times are in Central Time.

Date	Bye Week
October 9	Illinois State

==== Week 7 ====
Date	Time	Visiting team	Home team	Site	TV	Result	Attendance	Ref.
October 16	12:00 PM	No. 7 **South Dakota State**	**Western Illinois**	Hanson Field • Macomb, IL	ESPN+	**SDSU** 41–17	2,827	
October 16	2:00 PM	No. 3 **North Dakota State**	**Illinois State**†	Hancock Stadium • Normal, IL	ESPN+	**NDSU** 20–0	12,416	
October 16	2:00 PM	**Indiana State**	No. 20 **Missouri State**†	Robert W. Plaster Stadium • Springfield, MO	ESPN+	**MOST** 37–7	14,336	
October 16	2:00 PM	No. 22 **North Dakota**	No. 4 **Southern Illinois**	Saluki Stadium • Carbondale, IL	ESPN3	**SIU** 31–28	10,644	
October 16	4:00 PM	No. 21 **South Dakota**	No. 16 **Northern Iowa**	UNI-Dome • Cedar Falls, IA		**USD** 34–21	7,202	
^{#}Rankings from Stats Perform. All times are in Central Time.

Date	Bye Week
October 16	Youngstown State

==== Week 8 ====
Date	Time	Visiting team	Home team	Site	TV	Result	Attendance	Ref.
October 23	2:30 PM	No. 17 **Missouri State**	No. 3 **North Dakota State**	Fargodome • Fargo, ND	ESPN+	**NDSU** 27–20	15,559	
October 23	1:00 PM	**Illinois State**	No. 15 **South Dakota**	DakotaDome • Vermillion, SD	ESPN+	**ILST** 20–14	5,415	
October 23	2:00 PM	No. 20 **Northern Iowa**	No. 6 **South Dakota State**	Dana J. Dykhouse Stadium • Brookings, SD	ESPN3	**UNI** 26–17	16,889	
October 23	1:00 PM	**Youngstown State**	**Indiana State**	Memorial Stadium • Terre Haute, IN	ESPN+	**INST** 28–17	5,479	
October 23	2:00 PM	**Western Illinois**	No. RV **North Dakota**	Alerus Center • Grand Forks, ND	ESPN+	**UND** 34–10	8,807	
^{#}Rankings from Stats Perform. All times are in Central Time.

Date	Bye Week
October 23	No. 4 Southern Illinois

==== Week 9 ====
Date	Time	Visiting team	Home team	Site	TV	Result	Attendance	Ref.
October 30	1:00 PM	No. 10 **South Dakota State**	**Youngstown State**	Stambaugh Stadium • Youngstown, OH	ESPN+	**SDSU** 47–16	9,423	
October 30	2:30 PM	**Indiana State**	No. 2 **North Dakota State**	Fargodome • Fargo, ND	ESPN+	**NDSU** 44–2	14,383	
October 30	2:00 PM	No. RV **North Dakota**	No. 17 **Missouri State**	Robert W. Plaster Stadium • Springfield, MO	ESPN+	**MOST** 32–28	8,372	
October 30	4:00 PM	No. 3 **Southern Illinois**	No. 16 **Northern Iowa**	UNI-Dome • Cedar Falls, IA	ESPN+	**UNI** 23–16	5,902	
October 30	3:00 PM	**Illinois State**	**Western Illinois**	Hanson Field • Macomb, IL	ESPN3	**WIU** 38–31	2,118	
^{#}Rankings from Stats Perform. All times are in Central Time.

Date	Bye Week
October 30	No. 21 South Dakota

==== Week 10 ====
Date	Time	Visiting team	Home team	Site	TV	Result	Attendance	Ref.
November 6	2:00 PM	No. 2 **North Dakota State**	No. 9 **South Dakota State**	Dana J. Dykhouse Stadium • Brookings, SD (Dakota Marker)	ESPN+	**SDSU** 27–19	18,122	
November 6	12:00 PM	No. 17 **Missouri State**	No. 7 **Southern Illinois**	Saluki Stadium • Carbondale, IL	ESPN3	**MOST** 38–28	7,176	
November 6	12:00 PM	No. 23 **South Dakota**	**Western Illinois**	Hanson Field • Macomb, IL	ESPN+	**USD** 42–21	1,972	
November 6	12:00 PM	No. 13 **Northern Iowa**	**Illinois State**	Hancock Stadium • Normal, IL		**ILST** 17–10^{OT}	6,000	
November 6	12:00 PM	**Youngstown State**	**North Dakota**	Alerus Center • Grand Forks, ND	ESPN+	**UND** 24–21	8,441	
^{#}Rankings from Stats Perform. All times are in Central Time.

Date	Bye Week
November 6	Indiana State

==== Week 11 ====
Date	Time	Visiting team	Home team	Site	TV	Result	Attendance	Ref.
November 13	11:00 AM	No. 5 **North Dakota State**	**Youngstown State**	Stambaugh Stadium • Youngstown, OH	ESPN+	**NDSU** 49–17	8,307	
November 13	2:00 PM	No. 20 **Northern Iowa**	No. 16 **Missouri State**	Robert W. Plaster Stadium • Springfield, IL	ESPN+	**MOST** 34–27	9,173	
November 13	12:00 PM	No. 15 **Southern Illinois**	**Indiana State**	Memorial Stadium • Terre Haute, IN	ESPN3	**SIU** 47–21	3,265	
November 13	1:00 PM	No. 4 **South Dakota State**	No. 19 **South Dakota**	DakotaDome • Vermillion, SD		**USD** 23–20	9,068	
November 13	2:00 PM	**Illinois State**	**North Dakota**	Alerus Center • Grand Forks, ND	ESPN+	**UND** 14–7	6,141	
^{#}Rankings from Stats Perform. All times are in Central Time.

Date	Bye Week
November 13	Western Illinois

==== Week 12 ====
Date	Time	Visiting team	Home team	Site	TV	Result	Attendance	Ref.
November 20	12:00 PM	**Youngstown State**	No. 17 **Southern Illinois**	Saluki Stadium • Carbondale, IL	ESPN+	**YSU** 35–18	4,935	
November 20	1:00 PM	**Indiana State**	**Illinois State**	Hancock Stadium • Normal, IL		**INST** 15–10	2,890	
November 20	1:00 PM	**Western Illinois**	No. RV **Northern Iowa**	UNI-Dome • Cedar Falls, IA	ESPN3	**UNI** 41–3	6,785	
November 20	2:00 PM	**North Dakota**	No. 12 **South Dakota State**	Dana J. Dykhouse Stadium • Brookings, SD	ESPN+	**SDSU** 24–21	8,132	
November 20	2:30 PM	No. 16 **South Dakota**	No. 4 **North Dakota State**	Fargodome • Fargo, ND	ESPN+	**NDSU** 52–24	16,252	
November 20	8:00 PM	No. 14 **Missouri State**	Dixie State	Greater Zion Stadium • St. George, UT	ESPN+	**W** 55–24	2,794	
^{#}Rankings from Stats Perform. All times are in Central Time.

== Postseason ==
In 2021, six teams made the FCS playoffs. North Dakota State (No. 2) received a first bye. Missouri State, Southern Illinois, South Dakota, South Dakota State, and Northern Iowa were all unseeded and played in the first round. Below are the games in which they played.

Index to colors and formatting
MVFC member won
MVFC member lost
MVFC teams in **bold**

All times Central time. Tournament seedings in parentheses

=== First round ===
Date	Time	Visiting team	Home team	Site	TV	Result	Attendance	Ref.
November 27	2:00 PM	No. 14 UC Davis (Big Sky)	No. 11 **South Dakota State**	Dana J. Dykhouse Stadium • Brookings, SD	ESPN+	**W** 56–24	3,681	
November 27	3:00 PM	No. 16 UT Martin (OVC)	No. 12 **Missouri State**	Robert W. Plaster Stadium • Springfield, MO	ESPN+	**L** 31–32	5,072	
November 27	3:00 PM	No. RV **Northern Iowa**	No. 4 Eastern Washington (Big Sky)	Roos Field • Cheney, WA	ESPN+	**L** 9–19	3,845	
November 27	5:00 PM	No. 21 **Southern Illinois**	No. 17 **South Dakota**	DakotaDome • Vermillion, SD	ESPN+	**SIU** 22–10	3,597	
^{#}Rankings from Stats Perform. All times are in Central Time.

=== Second round ===
Date	Time	Visiting team	Home team	Site	TV	Result	Attendance	Ref.
December 4	2:30 PM	No. 21 **Southern Illinois**	No. 3 (2) **North Dakota State**	Fargodome • Fargo, ND	ESPN+	**NDSU** 38–7	12,557	
December 4	8:00 PM	No. 11 **South Dakota State**	No. 8 (4) Sacramento State	Hornet Stadium • Sacramento, CA	ESPN+	**W** 24–19	10,031	
^{#}Rankings from Stats Perform. All times are in Central Time.

=== Quarterfinals ===
Date	Time	Visiting team	Home team	Site	TV	Result	Attendance	Ref.
December 11	11:00 AM	No. 7 (7) East Tennessee State (SoCon)	No. 3 (2) **North Dakota State**	Fargodome • Fargo, ND	ESPN	**W** 27–3	11,794	
December 11	1:00 PM	No. 11 **South Dakota State**	No. 6 (5) Villanova (CAA)	Villanova Stadium • Villanova, PA	ESPN+	**W** 35–21	3,401	
^{#}Rankings from Stats Perform. All times are in Central Time.

=== Semifinals ===
Date	Time	Visiting team	Home team	Site	TV	Result	Attendance	Ref.
December 17	8:15 PM	No. 2 (3) James Madison (CAA)	No. 3 (2) **North Dakota State**	Fargodome • Fargo, ND	ESPN2	**W** 20–14	16,550	
December 18	1:00 PM	No. 11 **South Dakota State**	No. 7 (8) Montana State (Big Sky)	Bobcat Stadium • Bozeman, MT	ESPN2	**L** 17–31	20,457	
^{#}Rankings from Stats Perform. All times are in Central Time.

=== National Championship ===
Date	Time	Visiting team	Home team	Site	TV	Result	Attendance	Ref.
January 8	11:00 AM	No. 7 (8) Montana State (Big Sky)	No. 3 (2) **North Dakota State**	Toyota Stadium • Frisco, TX	ESPN2	**W** 38–10	18,942	
^{#}Rankings from Stats Perform. All times are in Central Time.

== MVFC records vs other conferences ==
2021-22 records against non-conference foes (through January 8, 2022):

FCS Power Conferences	Record
Big Sky	4–2
CAA	2–0
FCS Power Total	6–2
Other FCS Conferences	Record
ASUN	2–0
Big South	None
Ivy League	None
MEAC	None
Northeast	None
OVC	3–0
Patriot	None
PFL	5–0
SoCon	None
Southland	1–0
SWAC	None
WAC	2–0
Other FCS Total	13–0
FCS Total	19–2
FBS Opponents	Record
Football Bowl Subdivision	1–9
Other NCAA Divisions	Record
Division II	1–0
Total Non-Conference Record	21–11

Post Season

FCS Power Conferences	Record
Big Sky	3–2
CAA	2–0
FCS Power Total	5–2
Other FCS Conferences	Record
ASUN	None
Big South	None
Ivy League	None
MEAC	None
Northeast	None
OVC	0–1
Patriot	None
PFL	None
SoCon	1–0
Southland	None
SWAC	None
WAC	None
Other FCS Total	1–1
Total Postseason Record	6–3

== Awards and honors ==
=== Player of the week honors ===
Week	Offensive			Defensive			Special Teams			Freshman		
Week	Player	Position	Team	Player	Position	Team	Player	Position	Team	Player	Position	Team
Week 1 (Sept. 5)	Jaleel McLaughlin	RB	YSU	Michael Thomas	DB	INST	Colt McFadden	PK	YSU	Jason Shelley	QB	MOST
Week 1 (Sept. 5)	Nic Baker	QB	SIU	Michael Thomas	DB	INST	Colt McFadden	PK	YSU	Chris Oladokun	QB	SDSU
Week 2 (Sept. 12)	Xavier Lane	WR	MOST	Spencer Cuvelier	MLB	UNI	Montrae Braswell	CB	MOST	Xavier Lane	WR	MOST
Week 3 (Sept. 19)	Connor Sampson	QB	WIU	Braydon Deming	DE	ILST	Hunter Lunsford	DB	INST	Phazione McClurge	WR	INST
Week 4 (Sept. 26)	Pierre Strong Jr.	RB	SDSU	Darius Joiner	DB	WIU	Izaiah Hartrup	WR	SIU	Jason Shelley	QB	MOST
Week 5 (Oct. 3)	Tobias Little	RB	MOST	Spencer Cuvelier	LB	UNI	Jake Reinholz	K	NDSU	Nate Thomas	RB	USD
Week 6 (Oct. 10)	Nic Baker	QB	SIU	Inoke Moala	DE	INST	Jack Colquhoun	P	SIU	Demeatric Crenshaw	QB	YSU
Week 7 (Oct. 17)	Isaiah Smith	RB	UND	Jack Cochrane	LB	USD	Steven Ward	LB	MOST	Quincy Patterson	QB	NDSU
Week 8 (Oct. 24)	Cole Mueller	RB	ILST	JJ Henderson	DB	INST	Matthew Cook	PK	UNI	Cole Mueller	RB	ILST
Week 9 (Oct. 31)	Jason Shelley	QB	MOST	Ferrin Manuleleua	LB	MOST	Nate Murphy	P	UNI	Jason Shelley	QB	MOST
Week 10 (Nov. 7)	Pierre Strong Jr	RB	SDSU	Zeke Vandenburg	LB	ILST	JT Bohlken	P	ILST	Nate Thomas	RB	USD
Week 11 (Nov. 14)	Jason Shelley	QB	MOST	David Miller	CB	SIU	Cade Peterson	P	UND	Jeremiah Webb	WR	USD
Week 12 (Nov. 21)	Jaleel McLaughlin	RB	YSU	Riley Van Wyhe	LB	UNI	Jose Pizano	PK	MOST	Kevon Latulas	RB	MOST

=== Players of the Year ===
On November 29, 2021, the Missouri Valley Football Conference released their Players of the Year and All-Conference Honors.

==== Offensive Player of the Year ====
- Jason Shelley, QB (RS-Jr, Missouri State)

==== Defensive Player of the Year ====
- Jared Brinkman, DL (RS-Sr, Northern Iowa)

==== Newcomer of the Year ====
- Jason Shelley, QB (RS-Jr, Missouri State)

==== Freshman of the Year ====
- Demeatric Crenshaw, QB (RS-Fr, Youngstown State)

==== Coach of the Year ====
- Matt Entz (North Dakota State)

=== All-Conference Teams ===
Award	Player	School	Position	Year
First Team Offense	Jason Shelley	Missouri State	QB	RS-Jr.
First Team Offense	Jaleel McLaughlin	Youngstown State	RB	Sr.
First Team Offense	Pierre Strong Jr.	South Dakota State	RB	Sr.
First Team Offense	Hunter Luepke	North Dakota State	FB	Jr.
First Team Offense	Tucker Kraft	South Dakota State	TE	So.
First Team Offense	Dennis Houston	Western Illinois	WR	Sr.
First Team Offense	Tyrone Scott	Missouri State	WR	RS-So.
First Team Offense	Christian Watson	North Dakota State	WR	Sr.
First Team Offense	Zeveyon Furcron	Southern Illinois	OL	Sr.
First Team Offense	Cody Mauch	North Dakota State	OL	Sr.
First Team Offense	Trevor Penning	Northern Iowa	OL	RS-Jr.
First Team Offense	Cordell Volson	North Dakota State	OL	Sr.
First Team Offense	Matt Waletzko	North Dakota	OL	Sr.
First Team Offense	Christian Watson	North Dakota State	AP	Sr.
First Team Defense	Jared Brinkman	Northern Iowa	DL	RS-Sr.
First Team Defense	Kevin Ellis	Missouri State	DL	Jr.
First Team Defense	Inoke Moala	Indiana State	DL	RS-Sr.
First Team Defense	Brayden Thomas	North Dakota State	DL	Sr.
First Team Defense	Logan Backhaus	South Dakota State	LB	Sr.
First Team Defense	Adam Bock	South Dakota State	LB	So.
First Team Defense	Jack Cochrane	South Dakota	LB	Sr.
First Team Defense	Spencer Cuvelier	Northern Iowa	LB	RS-Jr.
First Team Defense	Montrae Braswell	Missouri State	DB	So.
First Team Defense	Qua Brown	Southern Illinois	DB	Sr.
First Team Defense	Darius Joiner	Western Illinois	DB	Sr.
First Team Defense	Benny Sapp III	Northern Iowa	DB	Jr.
First Team Defense	Michael Tutsie	North Dakota State	DB	Sr.
First Team Special Teams	Grant Burkett	Missouri State	P	RS-Fr.
First Team Special Teams	Matthew Cook	Northern Iowa	PK	So.
First Team Special Teams	Montrae Braswell	Missouri State	RS	So.
First Team Special Teams	Dalton Godfrey	South Dakota	DS	Jr.

Award	Player	School	Position	Year
Second Team Offense	Connor Sampson	Western Illinois	QB	Sr.
Second Team Offense	Otis Weah	North Dakota	RB	Jr.
Second Team Offense	Javon Williams Jr.	Southern Illinois	RB	So.
Second Team Offense	Tim McCloyn	Illinois State	FB	Sr.
Second Team Offense	Josh Babicz	North Dakota State	TE	Sr.
Second Team Offense	Jaxon Janke	South Dakota State	WR	Jr.
Second Team Offense	Landon Lenoir	Southern Illinois	WR	Sr.
Second Team Offense	Isaiah Weston	Northern Iowa	WR	RS-Jr.
Second Team Offense	Landon Bebee	Missouri State	OL	So.
Second Team Offense	Wes Genant	South Dakota State	OL	Sr.
Second Team Offense	Alex Jensen	South Dakota	OL	Jr.
Second Team Offense	Aron Johnson	South Dakota State	OL	Sr.
Second Team Offense	Mason McCormick	South Dakota State	OL	Jr.
Second Team Offense	Isaiah Weston	Northern Iowa	AP	RS-Jr.
Second Team Defense	Eric Johnson	Missouri State	DL	Sr.
Second Team Defense	Anthony Knighton	Southern Illinois	DL	Sr.
Second Team Defense	Caleb Sanders	South Dakota State	DL	Sr.
Second Team Defense	Reece Winkelman	South Dakota State	DL	Sr.
Second Team Defense	Jasir Cox	North Dakota State	LB	Sr.
Second Team Defense	Jackson Hankey	North Dakota State	LB	Sr.
Second Team Defense	Bryce Notree	Southern Illinois	LB	Sr.
Second Team Defense	Tylar Wiltz	Missouri State	LB	Jr.
Second Team Defense	Don Gardner	South Dakota State	DB	Sr.
Second Team Defense	Evan Holm	North Dakota	DB	Sr.
Second Team Defense	Clayton Isbell	Illinois State	DB	So.
Second Team Defense	Michael Lawson	Western Illinois	DB	Sr.
Second Team Defense	Elijah Reed	South Dakota	DB	Sr.
Second Team Special Teams	Brady Schutt	South Dakota	P	Sr.
Second Team Special Teams	Jose Pizano	Missouri State	PK	So.
Second Team Special Teams	Jayden Price	North Dakota State	RS	Jr.
Second Team Special Teams	Bradey Sorenson	South Dakota State	DS	Sr.

=== All-Newcomer Team ===
Award	Player	School	Position	Year
All-Newcomer Team Offense	Demeatric Crenshaw	Youngstown State	QB	RS-Fr.
All-Newcomer Team Offense	Theo Day	Northern Iowa	QB	RS-So.
All-Newcomer Team Offense	Bryson Deming	Illinois State	TE	Jr.
All-Newcomer Team Offense	Xavier Lane	Missouri State	WR	RS-Sr.
All-Newcomer Team Offense	Cole Mueller	Illinois State	RB	RS-Fr.
All-Newcomer Team Offense	Chris Oladokun	South Dakota State	QB	GS
All-Newcomer Team Offense	Quincy Patterson	North Dakota State	QB	Jr.
All-Newcomer Team Offense	Tyrone Scott	Missouri State	WR	RS-So.
All-Newcomer Team Offense	Jason Shelley	Missouri State	QB	RS-Jr.
All-Newcomer Team Offense	Isaiah Smith	North Dakota	RB	RS-Fr.
All-Newcomer Team Offense	Nate Thomas	South Dakota	RB	Fr.
All-Newcomer Team Offense	Tamerik Williams	North Dakota State	RB	Jr.
All-Newcomer Team Defense
All-Newcomer Team Defense	Geoffrey Brown	Indiana State	LB	Fr.
All-Newcomer Team Defense	Braydon Deming	Illinois State	DL	Jr.
All-Newcomer Team Defense	Nick Gaes	South Dakota	DT	RS-Fr.
All-Newcomer Team Defense	Josiah Ganues	South Dakota	DB	Fr.
All-Newcomer Team Defense	JJ Henderson	Indiana State	DB	GS
All-Newcomer Team Defense	Darius Joiner	Western Illinois	DB	Sr.
All-Newcomer Team Defense	Allen Love	Missouri State	DL	RS-So.
All-Newcomer Team Defense	Ben McNaboe	North Dakota	DL	So.
All-Newcomer Team Defense	David Miller	Southern Illinois	CB	Fr.
All-Newcomer Team Defense	Loshiaka Roques	North Dakota State	DE	RS-Fr.
All-Newcomer Team Defense	Marques Sigle	North Dakota State	CB	RS-Fr.
All-Newcomer Team Defense	Siale Suliafu	Missouri State	DL	Fr.

=== National Awards ===
On December 7, 2021, STATS Perform released their list of finalists for the Walter Payton Award, Buck Buchanan Award, and the Jerry Rice Award, respectively.

==== Walter Payton Award ====
The Walter Payton Award is given to the best FCS offensive player. Here are the MVFC finalists:

- Pierre Strong Jr. (RB - South Dakota State)
- Trevor Penning (OT - Northern Iowa)
- Jason Shelley (QB - Missouri State)

==== Buck Buchanan Award ====
The Buck Buchanan Award is given to the best FCS defensive player. Here are the MVFC finalists:

- Darius Joiner (S - Western Illinois)
- Adam Bock (LB - South Dakota State)

==== Jerry Rice Award ====
The Jerry Rice Award is given to the best FCS freshman player. Here are the MVFC finalists:

- Demeatric Crenshaw (QB - Youngstown State)

=== All-Americans ===
	AP 1st Team	AP 2nd Team	AP 3rd Team	AFCA 1st Team	AFCA 2nd Team	STATS 1st Team	STATS 2nd Team	STATS 3rd Team	ADA	HERO 1st Team	HERO 2nd Team	HERO 3rd Team
Adam Bock, LB, South Dakota State							✓			✓		
Brayden Thomas, DL, North Dakota State			✓					✓				✓
Cordell Volson, OL, North Dakota State	✓			✓		✓				✓		
Cody Mauch, OL, North Dakota State		✓										✓
Christian Watson, WR, North Dakota State		✓					✓			✓		
Darius Joiner, DB, Western Illinois	✓										✓	
Dennis Houston, WR, Western Illinois			✓					✓				✓
Grant Burkett, P, Missouri State			✓		✓			✓				
Hunter Luepke, FB, North Dakota State						✓				✓		
Jack Cochrane, LB, South Dakota							✓					✓
Jared Brinkman, DL, Northern Iowa	✓			✓		✓				✓		
Jaleel McLaughlin, RB, Youngstown State			✓					✓				✓
Jayden Price, PR, North Dakota State								✓				
Mason McCormick, OL, South Dakota State										✓		
Matt Waletzko, OL, North Dakota		✓			✓		✓				✓	
Matthew Cook, PK, Northern Iowa					✓		✓				✓	
Michael Tutsie, DB, North Dakota State								✓		✓		
Montrae Braswell, DB, Missouri State		✓					✓					
Noah Gindorff, TE, North Dakota State												✓
Pierre Strong Jr., RB, South Dakota State	✓			✓		✓				✓		
Qua Brown, DB, Missouri State							✓				✓	
Trevor Penning, OL, Northern Iowa	✓			✓		✓			✓	✓		
Tucker Kraft, TE, South Dakota State		✓				✓				✓		
ZeVeyon Furcron, OL, Southern Illinois		✓						✓				✓

== Home attendance ==
Team	Stadium	Capacity	Game 1	Game 2	Game 3	Game 4	Game 5	Game 6	Game 7	Game 8	Game 9	Total	Average	% of Capacity
Illinois State	Hancock Stadium	13,391	8,148	N/A	12,416†	6,000	2,890					29,454	7,363	55.0%
Indiana State	Memorial Stadium	12,764	5,540	6,652†	3,943	5,479	3,265					24,879	4,975	38.9%
Missouri State	Robert W. Plaster Stadium	17,500	11,247	12,738	14,336†	8,372	9,173	5,072‡				60,938	10,156	58.0%
North Dakota	Alerus Center	12,283	10,143	**12,846**†	8,807	8,441	8,068					48,305	9,661	78.7%
North Dakota State	Fargodome	18,700	15,156	15,118	18,536†	15,559	14,383	16,252	12,557‡	11,794‡	16,550‡	135,905	15,100	80.8%
Northern Iowa	UNI-Dome	16,324	5,124	8,771†	7,202	5,902	6,785					33,784	6,756	41.4%
South Dakota	DakotaDome	9,100	5,247	6,267	5,304	5,415	9,068†	3,597‡				34,898	5,816	63.9%
South Dakota State	Dana J. Dykhouse Stadium	19,340	15,162	14,473	12,216	16,889	18,122†	8,135	3,681‡			88,678	12,668	65.5%
Southern Illinois	Saluki Stadium	15,000	7,338	8,618	10,644†	7,176	4,935					38,711	7,742	51.6%
Western Illinois	Hanson Field	17,128	5,385†	4,107	2,827	2,118	1,972					16,409	3,281	19.2%
Youngstown State	Stambaugh Stadium	20,630	8,637	13,751†	12,444	9,423	8,307					52,562	10,512	51.0%

Bold - Exceed capacity
†Season High
‡FCS Playoff Game

== 2022 NFL draft ==
The following list includes all MVFC players who were drafted in the 2022 NFL draft.

Player	Position	School	Draft Round	Round Pick	Overall Pick	Team	Notes
Trevor Penning	OT	Northern Iowa	1	19	19	New Orleans Saints	from Philadelphia
Christian Watson	WR	North Dakota State	2	2	34	Green Bay Packers	from Detroit via Minnesota
Pierre Strong Jr.	RB	South Dakota State	4	22	127	New England Patriots	
Cordell Volson	OT	North Dakota State	4	31	136	Cincinnati Bengals	
Matt Waletzko	OT	North Dakota	5	12	155	Dallas Cowboys	from Cleveland
Eric Johnson	DT	Missouri State	5	16	159	Indianapolis Colts	
Andrew Ogletree	TE	Youngstown State	6	13	192	Indianapolis Colts	from Minnesota
Chris Oladokun	QB	South Dakota State	7	20	241	Pittsburgh Steelers	

=== Undrafted Free Agents ===
Player	Position	School	Team
Aron Johnson	OT	South Dakota State	Baltimore Ravens
Don Gardner	CB	South Dakota State	Tampa Bay Buccaneers
Michael Griffin	S	South Dakota State	Tennessee Titans
Josh Babicz	TE	North Dakota State	Carolina Panthers
Brayden Thomas	OLB	North Dakota State	Los Angeles Rams
Isaiah Weston	WR	Northern Iowa	Cleveland Browns
Jack Cochrane	LB	South Dakota	Kansas City Chiefs

== Head coaches ==
Through January 8, 2022

Team	Head coach	Years at school	Overall record	Record at school	MVFC record	MVFC titles	FCS Playoff appearances	FCS Playoff record	National Titles
Illinois State	Brock Spack	13	89–60 (.597)	89–60 (.597)	56–44 (.560)	2	5	7–5 (.583)	0
Indiana State	Curt Mallory	4	17–28 (.378)	17–28 (.378)	11–21 (.344)	0	0	0–0 (–)	0
Missouri State	Bobby Petrino (Note: Bobby Petrino coached in the FBS from 2003-06 and 2015-18 for Louisville, 2008-11 for Arkansas, as well as in 2013 for Western Kentucky.)	2	132–65 (.670)	13–9 (.591)	11–3 (.786)	1	2	0–2 (.000)	0
North Dakota	Bubba Schweigert (Note: Bubba Schweigert coached Minnesota Duluth of NCAA Division II from 2004-07. He also coached North Dakota while they were a part of the Big Sky Conference from 2014-17 and were independents in 2018 and 2019.)	8	69–61 (.531)	47–40 (.540)	7–6 (.538)	0	3	1–3 (.250)	0
North Dakota State	Matt Entz	3	35–4 (.897)	35–4 (.897)	20–3 (.870)	2	3	6–1 (.857)	2
Northern Iowa	Mark Farley	21	168–93 (.644)	168–93 (.644)	106–53 (.667)	7	13	16–13 (.552)	0
South Dakota	Bob Nielson (Note: Bob Nielson coached Western Illinois from 2013-15, which included a run in the playoffs that ended in the second round. Nielson also coached Minnesota-Duluth from 1999-2003 and 2008-12, that second stint included five consecutive NCAA Division II playoff appearances highlighted by 2 National Titles. In the first stint at MN-Duluth included his first Division II playoff appearance. Nielson also coached Wisconsin-Eau Claire from 1996-98 that included one NCAA Division III playoff run that ended in the semifinals. Before that, he coached Wartburg from 1991-95, which included two Division III playoff runs as well. His first head coaching job was at Ripon from 1989-90.)	6	215–114–1 (.653)	29–34 (.460)	20–24 (.455)	0	2	1–2 (.333)	2
South Dakota State	John Stiegelmeier (Note: John Stiegelmeier has coached South Dakota State since 1997, when the school was still part of NCAA Division II. While in Division II, the school did not achieve any playoff appearances.)	25	185–111 (.625)	185–111 (.625)	76–34 (.691)	2	11	14–11 (.560)	0
Southern Illinois	Nick Hill	6	31–37 (.456)	31–37 (.456)	18–28 (.391)	0	2	2–2 (.500)	0
Western Illinois	Jared Elliott	4	9–31 (.225)	9–31 (.225)	8–22 (.267)	0	0	0–0 (–)	0
Youngstown State	Doug Phillips	2	4–13 (.235)	4–13 (.235)	3–12 (.200)	0	0	0–0 (–)	0
