= 2021 Northern Iowa Panthers football team =

American college football season

2021 Northern Iowa Panthers football

NCAA Division I First Round, L 9–19 at Eastern Washington
- Conference: Missouri Valley Football Conference

Ranking
- STATS: No. 23
- FCS Coaches: No. 25
- Record: 6–6 (4–4 MVFC)
- Head coach: Mark Farley (21st season)
- Offensive coordinator: Shawn Watson (1st season)
- Defensive coordinator: Jeremiah Johnson (9th season)
- Home stadium: UNI-Dome

2021 Missouri Valley Football Conference standings
	Conf.			Overall
Team	W		L	W		L
No. 1 North Dakota State $^	7	–	1	14	–	1
No. 14 Missouri State ^	6	–	2	8	–	4
No. 16 Southern Illinois ^	5	–	3	8	–	5
No. 18 South Dakota ^	5	–	3	7	–	5
No. 4 South Dakota State ^	5	–	3	11	–	4
No. 23 Northern Iowa ^	4	–	4	6	–	6
Indiana State	3	–	5	5	–	6
North Dakota	3	–	5	5	–	6
Western Illinois	2	–	6	2	–	9
Illinois State	2	–	6	4	–	7
Youngstown State	2	–	6	3	–	7
$ – Conference champion; ^ – FCS playoff participant; Rankings from STATS Poll

The 2021 Northern Iowa Panthers football team represented the University of Northern Iowa as a member of the Missouri Valley Football Conference (MVFC) during the 2021 NCAA Division I FCS football season. Led by 21st-year head coach Mark Farley, the Panthers compiled an overall record of 6–6 with a mark of 4–4 in conference play, placing sixth in the MVFC. Northern Iowa received an at-large bid to NCAA Division I Football Championship playoffs, where the Panthers lost to Eastern Washington in the first round. The team played home games at the UNI-Dome in Cedar Falls, Iowa.

== Schedule ==
Date	Time	Opponent	Rank	Site	TV	Result	Attendance
September 4	3:30 p.m.	at No. 7 (FBS) Iowa State*	No. 21	Jack Trice Stadium; Ames, IA	ESPN+	L 10–16	61,500
September 11	8:00 p.m.	at Sacramento State*	No. 21	Hornet Stadium; Sacramento, CA	ESPN+	W 34–16	8,067
September 18	4:00 p.m.	St. Thomas (MN)*	No. 18	UNI-Dome; Cedar Falls, IA	ESPN3	W 44–3	5,124
October 2	4:00 p.m.	Youngstown State	No. 15	UNI-Dome; Cedar Falls, IA		W 34–7	8,771
October 9	1:00 p.m.	at No. 5 North Dakota State	No. 16	Fargodome; Fargo, ND	ESPN+	L 20–34	18,536
October 16	4:00 p.m.	No. 21 South Dakota	No. 16	UNI-Dome; Cedar Falls, IA		L 21–34	7,202
October 23	2:00 p.m.	at No. 6 South Dakota State	No. 20	Dana J. Dykhouse Stadium; Brookings, SD		W 26–17	16,889
October 30	4:00 p.m.	No. 3 Southern Illinois	No. 16	UNI-Dome; Cedar Falls, IA		W 23–16	5,902
November 6	12:00 p.m.	at Illinois State	No. 13	Hancock Stadium; Normal, IL		L 10–17 ^{OT}	6,000
November 13	2:00 p.m.	at No. 16 Missouri State	No. 20	Robert W. Plaster Stadium; Springfield, MO		L 27–34	9,173
November 20	1:00 p.m.	Western Illinois		UNI-Dome; Cedar Falls, IA	ESPN3	W 41–3	6,785
November 27	3:00 p.m.	at No. 4 Eastern Washington*		Roos Field; Cheney, WA (NCAA Division I First Round)	ESPN+	L 9–19	3,845
*Non-conference game; Rankings from STATS Poll released prior to the game; All times are in Central time

== Game summaries ==
=== At No. 7 (FBS) Iowa State ===
No. 21 Northern Iowa Panthers (0–0) vs. No. 7 (FBS) Iowa State Cyclones (0–0)

Quarter	1	2	3	4	Total
No. 21 Northern Iowa	7	3	0	0	10
No. 7 (FBS) Iowa State	3	10	0	3	16

at Jack Trice Stadium • Ames, IA

- Date: Saturday, September 4, 2021
- Game time: 3:30 p.m. CDT
- Game weather: sunny • Temperature: 73°F
- Game attendance: 61,500
- Referee: Kevin Hassell
- TV announcers (ESPN+): Shawn Kenney, Sage Rosenfels, Skubie Mageza

Game information

First Quarter

- (4:09) UNI – Quan Hampton 52 yard pass from Will McElvain, Matthew Cook kick (Drive: 5 plays, 87 yards, 3:24; UNI 7–0)
- (1:06) ISU – Connor Assalley 35 yard field goal (Drive: 6 plays, 57 yards, 3:03; UNI 7–3)

Second Quarter

- (7:25) ISU – Breece Hall 2 yard run, Connor Assalley kick (Drive: 14 plays, 59 yards, 7:19; ISU 10–7)
- (2:35) UNI – Matthew Cook 41 yard field goal (Drive: 10 plays, 51 yards, 4:50; 10–10)
- (0:00) ISU – Andrew Mevis 40 yard field goal (Drive 10 plays, 52 yards, 2:35; ISU 13–10)

Fourth Quarter

- (6:18) ISU – Connor Assalley 21 yard field goal (Drive: 10 plays, 57 yards, 5:20; ISU 16–10)

Statistics	UNI	ISU
First downs	13	17
Total yards	275	336
Rushes/yards	26/45	34/136
Passing yards	230	199
Passing: Comp–Att–Int	21–34–2	21–26–0
Time of possession	28:48	31:12

Team	Category	Player	Statistics
Northern Iowa	Passing	Will McElvain	21–34, 230 yards, 1 TD, 2 INT
Northern Iowa	Rushing	Dom Williams	12 carries, 43 yards
Northern Iowa	Receiving	Quan Hampton	8 receptions, 99 yards, 1 TD
Iowa State	Passing	Brock Purdy	21–26, 199 yards
Iowa State	Rushing	Breece Hall	23 carries, 69 yards, 1 TD
Iowa State	Receiving	Xavier Hutchinson	7 receptions, 88 yards

=== At Sacramento State ===
	1	2	3	4	Total
No. 21 Panthers	7	0	27	0	34
Hornets	3	6	0	7	16

=== At No. 5 North Dakota State ===
Northern Iowa Panthers (3-1) vs. North Dakota State Bison (4-0)

Quarter	1	2	3	4	Total
No. 12 Panthers	0	10	7	3	20
No. 5 Bison	10	3	14	7	34

at Fargodome, Fargo, ND

- Date: October 9, 2021
- Game time: 1:00 p.m. (CT)
- Game weather: Indoors; 70 °F (21 °C)
- Game attendance: 18,536
- TV: ESPN+

Statistics	Northern Iowa	North Dakota State
First downs	14	15
Plays–yards	63-381	64-363
Rushes–yards	32-124	43-181
Passing yards	257	182
Passing: comp–att–int	12-31-0	11-21-0
Time of possession	27:37	32:23

Team	Category	Player	Statistics
Northern Iowa	Passing	Theo Day	12/31, 257 yds, TD
Northern Iowa	Rushing	Bradrick Shaw	10 car, 44 yds
Northern Iowa	Receiving	Isaiah Weston	5 rec, 181 yds, TD
North Dakota State	Passing	Quincy Patterson	11/21, 182 yds, 2 TD
North Dakota State	Rushing	Quincy Patterson	12 car, 60 yds, 2 TD
North Dakota State	Receiving	Christian Watson	5 rec, 163 yds, TD

Scoring summary

Quarter	Time	Drive			Team	Scoring information	Score	
Quarter	Time	Plays	Yards	TOP	Team	Scoring information	UNI	NDSU
1st	7:37	1	85	0:11	NDSU	Christian Watson (#1) 85-yard touchdown reception from Quincy Patterson (#2), Jake Reinholz (#37) kick good	0	7
1st	3:37	6	40	2:11	NDSU		0	10
2nd	11:24	8	73	3:36	UNI	Isaiah Weston (#80) 44-yard touchdown reception from Theo Day (#12), Matthew Cook (#97) kick good	7	10
2nd	3:00	8	73	3:36	UNI	33-yard field goal by Matthew Cook (#97)	10	10
2nd	0:23	9	71	2:37	NDSU	22-yard field goal by Jake Reinholz (#37)	10	13
3rd	11:46	2	9	1:12	NDSU	Quincy Patterson (#2) 4-yard touchdown run, Jake Reinholz (#37) kick good	10	20
3rd	9:02	4	21	2:06	NDSU	Noah Gindorff (#87) 3-yard touchdown reception from Quincy Patterson (#2), Jake Reinholz (#37) kick good	10	27
3rd	7:39	3	75	1:23	UNI	Dom Williams (#7) 5-yard touchdown run, Matthew Cook (#98) kick good	17	27
4th	14:09	16	80	8:26	NDSU	Quincy Patterson (#2) 4-yard touchdown run, Jake Reinholz (#37) kick good	17	34
4th	9:08	11	48	5:01	UNI	44-yard field goal by Matthew Cook (#98)	20	34
"TOP" = time of possession. For other American football terms, see Glossary of American football.							20	34

=== At No. 16 Missouri State ===
Game Ten: #20 Northern Iowa Panthers (5–4) at #16 Missouri State Bears (6–3)

Quarter	1	2	3	4	Total
No. 20 Northern Iowa	3	3	7	14	27
No. 16 Missouri State	6	7	7	14	34

at Plaster Stadium • Springfield, MO

- Date: Saturday, November 13, 2021
- Game time: 2:05 p.m. CDT
- Game weather: 45 °F (7 °C), Winds W 7 mph; Sunny
- Game attendance: 9,173
- Referee: Aaron Adams • Umpire: Keith Wohlers • Linesman: Gordon Hanson • Line judge: Scott Lively • Back judge: Kurt Dingmann • Field judge: Brad Brunet • Side judge: Leanne Surmin
- TV announcers (ESPN+): Don West and Corey Riggs

Game information

First Quarter

- (10:14) MSU - Jose Pizano 30 yard field goal (Drive: 6 plays, 18 yards, 02:44; MSU 3-0)
- (04:55) UNI - Matthew Cook 27 yard field goal (Drive: 9 plays, 66 yards, 05:11; TIED 3-3)
- (01:03) MSU - Jose Pizano38 yard field goal (Drive: 9 plays, 35 yards, 03:44; MSU 6-3)

Second Quarter

- (12:54) UNI - Matthew Cook 47 yard field goal (Drive: 7 plays, 45 yards, 03:09; TIED 6-6)
- (05:21) MSU - Tobias Little 1 yard run, Jose Pizano kick (Drive: 13 plays, 75 yards, 07:33; MSU 13-6)

Third Quarter

- (12:44) MSU - Jason Shelley 3 yard run, Jose Pizano Kick (Drive: 4 plays, 75 yards, 0:10; MSU 20-6)
- (06:10) UNI - Tyler Hoosman 2 yard run, Matthew Cook kick (Drive: 12 plays, 73 yards, 06:25; MSU 20-13)

Fourth Quarter

- (13:01) MSU - Jason Shelley 8 yard run, Jose Pizano kick (Drive: 9 plays, 80 yards, 03:54; MSU 27-13)
- (05:11) UNI - Deion McShane 8 yard pass from Theo Day, Matthew Cook kick (Drive: 8 plays, 77 yards, 02:02; MSU 27-20)
- (02:14) UNI - Deion McShane 18 yard pass from Theo Day, Matthew Cook, kick (Drive: 5 plays, 32 yards, 01:41; TIED 27-27)
- (00:58) MSU - Naveon Mitchell 55 yard pass from Jason Shelley, Jose Pizano kick (Drive: 4 plays, 75 yards, 01:16; MSU 34-27)

Statistics	UNI	MSU
First downs	22	18
Total yards	360	379
Rushes/yards	33/122	32/59
Passing yards	238	320
Passing: Comp–Att–Int	17-30-2	22-30-0
Time of possession	29:28	30:32

Team	Category	Player	Statistics
Northern Iowa	Passing	Theo Day	17/30, 238 yards, 2 TD, 2 INT
Northern Iowa	Rushing	Dom Williams	16 carries, 83 yards
Northern Iowa	Receiving	Deion McShane	6 catches, 86 yards, 2 TD
Missouri State	Passing	Jason Shelley	22/33, 320 yards, 1 TD
Missouri State	Rushing	Tobias Little	10 carries, 34 yards
Missouri State	Receiving	Naveon Mitchell	3 catches, 74 yards, 1 TD

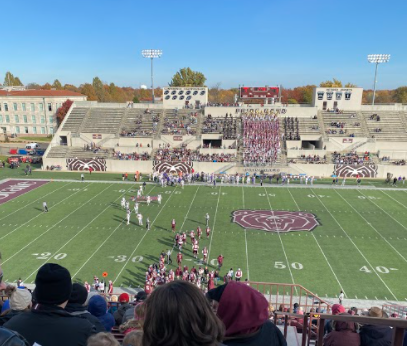
View from the West side during the game against Northern Iowa in 2021.

=== At No. 4 Eastern Washington—NCAA Division I First Round ===
	1	2	3	4	Total
Panthers	0	7	0	2	9
No. 4 Eagles	6	3	7	3	19

== Players drafted into the NFL ==
Round	Pick	Player	Position	NFL club
1	19	Trevor Penning	OT	New Orleans Saints
