= 2021 North Dakota Fighting Hawks football team =

American college football season

2021 North Dakota Fighting Hawks football
- Conference: Missouri Valley Football Conference
- Record: 5–6 (3–5 MVFC)
- Head coach: Bubba Schweigert (8th season)
- Offensive coordinator: Danny Freund (3rd season)
- Offensive scheme: Pistol
- Defensive coordinator: Brett Holinka (2nd season)
- Base defense: 3–4
- Home stadium: Alerus Center

2021 Missouri Valley Football Conference standings
	Conf.			Overall
Team	W		L	W		L
No. 1 North Dakota State $^	7	–	1	14	–	1
No. 14 Missouri State ^	6	–	2	8	–	4
No. 16 Southern Illinois ^	5	–	3	8	–	5
No. 18 South Dakota ^	5	–	3	7	–	5
No. 4 South Dakota State ^	5	–	3	11	–	4
No. 23 Northern Iowa ^	4	–	4	6	–	6
Indiana State	3	–	5	5	–	6
North Dakota	3	–	5	5	–	6
Western Illinois	2	–	6	2	–	9
Illinois State	2	–	6	4	–	7
Youngstown State	2	–	6	3	–	7
$ – Conference champion; ^ – FCS playoff participant; Rankings from STATS Poll

The 2021 North Dakota Fighting Hawks football team represented the University of North Dakota in the 2021 NCAA Division I FCS football season. The Fighting Hawks competed as members of the Missouri Valley Football Conference and were led by eight-year head coach Bubba Schweigert. They played their home games at Alerus Center in Grand Forks, North Dakota.

The Fighting Hawks finished the season 5–6, 3–5 in MVFC play to finish in eighth place.

== Schedule ==
Date	Time	Opponent	Rank	Site	TV	Result	Attendance
September 4	2:00 p.m.	at Idaho State*	No. 8	Holt Arena; Pocatello, ID	ESPN+	W 35–14	4,667
September 10	8:00 p.m.	at Utah State*	No. 9	Maverik Stadium; Logan, UT	CBSSN	L 24–48	18,124
September 18	4:00 p.m.	Drake*	No. 11	Alerus Center; Grand Forks, ND	ESPN+	W 38–0	10,143
October 2	2:00 p.m.	No. 5 North Dakota State	No. 10	Alerus Center; Grand Forks, ND (Nickel Trophy)	ESPN+	L 10–16	12,846
October 9	2:00 p.m.	at South Dakota	No. 13	DakotaDome; Vermillion, SD (Sitting Bull Trophy)	ESPN+	L 13–20	5,304
October 16	2:00 p.m.	at No. 4 Southern Illinois	No. 22	Saluki Stadium; Carbondale, IL	ESPN+	L 28–31	10,644
October 23	2:00 p.m.	Western Illinois^{†}		Alerus Center; Grand Forks, ND	ESPN+	W 34–10	8,807
October 30	2:00 p.m.	at No. 17 Missouri State		Robert W. Plaster Stadium; Springfield, MO	ESPN+	L 28–32	8,372
November 6	12:00 p.m.	Youngstown State		Alerus Center; Grand Forks, ND	ESPN+	W 24–21	8,441
November 13	2:00 p.m.	Illinois State		Alerus Center; Grand Forks, ND	ESPN+	W 14–7	6,141
November 20	2:00 p.m.	at No. 12 South Dakota State		Dana J. Dykhouse Stadium; Brookings, SD		L 21-24	8,132
*Non-conference game; ^{†}Homecoming; Rankings from STATS Poll released prior to the game; All times are in Central time
