= 2021 South Dakota State Jackrabbits football team =

American college football season

2021 South Dakota State Jackrabbits football

NCAA Division Semifinal, L 17–31 at Montana State
- Conference: Missouri Valley Football Conference

Ranking
- STATS: No. 4
- FCS Coaches: No. 5
- Record: 11–4 (5–3 MVFC)
- Head coach: John Stiegelmeier (25th season)
- Offensive coordinator: Jason Eck (3rd season)
- Co-defensive coordinators: Brian Bergstrom (3rd season); Jimmy Rogers (3rd season)
- MVP: Pierre Strong Jr.
- Home stadium: Dana J. Dykhouse Stadium

2021 Missouri Valley Football Conference standings
	Conf.			Overall
Team	W		L	W		L
No. 1 North Dakota State $^	7	–	1	14	–	1
No. 14 Missouri State ^	6	–	2	8	–	4
No. 16 Southern Illinois ^	5	–	3	8	–	5
No. 18 South Dakota ^	5	–	3	7	–	5
No. 4 South Dakota State ^	5	–	3	11	–	4
No. 23 Northern Iowa ^	4	–	4	6	–	6
Indiana State	3	–	5	5	–	6
North Dakota	3	–	5	5	–	6
Western Illinois	2	–	6	2	–	9
Illinois State	2	–	6	4	–	7
Youngstown State	2	–	6	3	–	7
$ – Conference champion; ^ – FCS playoff participant; Rankings from STATS Poll

The 2021 South Dakota State Jackrabbits football team represented South Dakota State University as a member of the Missouri Valley Football Conference (MVFC) during the 2021 NCAA Division I FCS football season. Led by 25th-year head coach John Stiegelmeier, the Jackrabbits compiled an overall record of 11–4 with a mark of 5–3 in conference play, placing in a three-way tie for third in the MVFC. South Dakota State received an at-large bid to the NCAA Division I Football Championship playoffs, where the Jackrabbits defeated UC Davis in the first round, Sacramento State in the second round, and Villanova in the quarterfinals before losing to Montana State in the semifinals. The team played home games on campus at Dana J. Dykhouse Stadium in Brookings, South Dakota.

After the season, offensive coordinator Jason Eck was hired as the head football coach at the University of Idaho.

== Schedule ==
Date	Time	Opponent	Rank	Site	TV	Result	Attendance
September 3	8:00 p.m.	at Colorado State*	No. 3	Canvas Stadium; Fort Collins, CO	FS1	W 42–23	32,327
September 11	6:00 p.m.	Lindenwood*	No. 2	Dana J. Dykhouse Stadium; Brookings, SD	ESPN3	W 52–7	15,162
September 25	12:00 p.m.	at Indiana State	No. 2	Memorial Stadium; Terre Haute, IN	ESPN+	W 44–0	6,652
October 2	6:00 p.m.	Dixie State*	No. 2	Dana J. Dykhouse Stadium; Brookings, SD	ESPN+/Midco	W 55–7	14,427
October 9	2:00 p.m.	No. 8 Southern Illinois	No. 2	Dana J. Dykhouse Stadium; Brookings, SD	ESPN+/Midco	L 41–42 ^{OT}	12,216
October 16	12:00 p.m.	at Western Illinois	No. 7	Hanson Field; Macomb, IL	ESPN+	W 41–17	2,827
October 23	2:00 p.m.	No. 20 Northern Iowa	No. 6	Dana J. Dykhouse Stadium; Brookings, SD	ESPN3	L 17–26	16,889
October 30	1:00 p.m.	at Youngstown State	No. 10	Stambaugh Stadium; Youngstown, OH	ESPN+	W 47–16	9,423
November 6	2:00 p.m.	No. 2 North Dakota State	No. 9	Dana J. Dykhouse Stadium; Brookings, SD (Dakota Marker)	ABC ND/ESPN+/Midco	W 27–19	18,122
November 13	2:00 p.m.	at No. 19 South Dakota	No. 4	DakotaDome; Vermillion, SD (rivalry)	ESPN+/Midco	L 20–23	9,068
November 20	2:00 p.m.	North Dakota	No. 12	Dana J. Dykhouse Stadium; Brookings, SD	ESPN+/Midco	W 24–21	8,132
November 27	2:00 p.m.	No. 14 UC Davis*	No. 11	Dana J. Dykhouse Stadium; Brookings, SD (NCAA Division I First Round)	ESPN+	W 56–24	3,681
December 4	8:00 p.m.	at No. 8 Sacramento State*	No. 11	Hornet Stadium; Sacramento, CA (NCAA Division I Second Round)	ESPN+	W 24–19	10,031
December 11	1:00 p.m.	at No. 6 Villanova*	No. 11	Villanova Stadium; Villanova, PA (NCAA Division I Quarterfinal)	ESPN+	W 35–21	3,401
December 18	1:00 p.m.	at No. 7 Montana State*	No. 11	Bobcat Stadium; Bozeman, MT (NCAA Division I Semifinal)	ESPN2	L 17–31	20,457
*Non-conference game; Rankings from STATS Poll released prior to the game; All times are in Central time

== Roster ==
2021 South Dakota State Jackrabbits football team roster
Players
Coaches
Offense

Pos.	#	Name	Class
QB	6	Chris Oladokun	Sr
RB	20	Pierre Strong Jr.	Sr
FB/TE	34	Michael Morgan	Jr
TE	85	Tucker Kraft	So
OL	60	Mason McCormick	Jr
OL	61	Evan Beerntsen	So
OL	74	Garret Greenfield	Jr
WR	10	Jaxon Janke	Jr

Defense

Pos.	#	Name	Class
LB	12	Logan Backhaus	Sr
LB	32	Adam Bock	So
DE	22	Tolu Ogunrinde	Sr
DE	48	Quinton Hicks	Jr
DE	50	Noah Jessup	Fr
DE	53	Caden Johnson	So
DE	54	Chandler Carter	Fr
DE	56	Levi Vanden Bos	Fr
DE	90	Randy Keumogne	So
DE	92	Kevin Brenner	So
DE	93	Max Baloun	Fr
DE	94	Cade Terveer	Jr
DE	95	Zac Wilson	So
DE	96	Mitch Eichacker	Fr
DE	97	Reece Winkelman	Sr
DT	2	Isaiah Stalbird	Jr
DT	52	Jarod DePriest	So
DT	55	Thomas Stacker	Sr
DT	65	Matthew Borowicz	Jr
DT	69	Krockett Krolikowski	Sr
DT	73	Coby Maeschen	Fr
DT	77	Aaron Wolfcale-Holsten	Fr
DT	88	Brandon Lane Jr.	Fr
DT	91	Xavier Ward	Sr
DT	98	Ryan Van Marel	Jr
DT	99	Caleb Sanders	Sr
CB	1	Malik Lofton	Sr
CB	5	DyShawn Gales	Jr
CB	7	Dalys Beanum	So
CB	13	Christopher Rhodes	Fr
CB	15	Timothy Croskey	Fr
CB	17	Abe Hoskins III	Fr
CB	20	Myles Taylor	Fr
CB	21	Don Gardner	Sr
CB	26	Steven Arrell	Fr
CB	39	Aydan Dautermann	Fr
S	6	Michael Griffin II	Sr

Special teams

Pos.	#	Name	Class
PK	97	Cole Frahm	Sr

Head coach

- John Stiegelmeier

Coordinators/assistant coaches

- Jimmy Rogers (assistant head coach/co-defensive coordinator/linebackers)
- Brian Bergstrom (co-defensive coordinator/safeties)
- Jason Eck (offensive coordinator/offensive line)
- Luke Schleusner (passing game coordinator/wide receivers)
- Rob Erickson (special teams coordinator/cornerbacks)
- Zach Lujan (quarterbacks/recruiting coordinator)
- Ryan Olson (tight ends)
- Andre Crenshaw (running backs)
- Christian Smith (defensive line)
- Spencer Erickson (assistant defensive line/director of player personnel)
- C. J. Butt (graduate assistant)
- Luke Munsterteiger (graduate assistant)
- Nate Moe (strength and conditioning)
- Derik Dillon (special teams assistant/video coordinator)
- Jonathan Shaeffer (director of football operations)

Legend

- (C) Team captain
- (S) Suspended
- (I) Ineligible
- Injured
- Redshirt

Roster
Last update: 2025-12-25

== Ranking movements ==
Ranking movements Legend: ██ Increase in ranking ██ Decrease in ranking ( ) = First-place votes
	Week													
Poll	Pre	1	2	3	4	5	6	7	8	9	10	11	12	Final
STATS FCS	3 (4)	2 (11)	2 (9)	2 (8)	2 (10)	2 (15)	7	6	10	9	4	12	11	4
Coaches	4 (1)	3 (3)	3 (2)	3 (1)	3 (1)	3 (1)	8	7	13	12	7	13	11	5

== Players drafted into the NFL ==
Round	Pick	Player	Position	NFL Club
4	127	Pierre Strong Jr.	RB	New England Patriots
7	241	Chris Oladokun	QB	Pittsburgh Steelers
