= 2021 South Dakota Coyotes football team =

American college football season

2021 South Dakota Coyotes football

FCS Playoffs First Round, L 10–22 vs. Southern Illinois
- Conference: Missouri Valley Football Conference

Ranking
- STATS: No. 18
- FCS Coaches: No. 20
- Record: 7–5 (5–3 MVFC)
- Head coach: Bob Nielson (6th season)
- Offensive coordinator: Ted Schlafke (4th season)
- Offensive scheme: Pro-style
- Defensive coordinator: Travis Johansen (3rd season)
- Base defense: Multiple
- Home stadium: DakotaDome

2021 Missouri Valley Football Conference standings
	Conf.			Overall
Team	W		L	W		L
No. 1 North Dakota State $^	7	–	1	14	–	1
No. 14 Missouri State ^	6	–	2	8	–	4
No. 16 Southern Illinois ^	5	–	3	8	–	5
No. 18 South Dakota ^	5	–	3	7	–	5
No. 4 South Dakota State ^	5	–	3	11	–	4
No. 23 Northern Iowa ^	4	–	4	6	–	6
Indiana State	3	–	5	5	–	6
North Dakota	3	–	5	5	–	6
Western Illinois	2	–	6	2	–	9
Illinois State	2	–	6	4	–	7
Youngstown State	2	–	6	3	–	7
$ – Conference champion; ^ – FCS playoff participant; Rankings from STATS Poll

The 2021 South Dakota Coyotes football team represented the University of South Dakota in the 2021 NCAA Division I FCS football season. The Coyotes competed as members of the Missouri Valley Football Conference and were led by sixth-year head coach Bob Nielson. They played their home games at the DakotaDome in Vermillion, South Dakota.

== Schedule ==
Date	Time	Opponent	Rank	Site	TV	Result	Attendance
September 3	7:00 p.m.	at Kansas*		David Booth Kansas Memorial Stadium; Lawrence, KS	ESPN+	L 14–17	26,103
September 11	1:00 p.m.	Northern Arizona*		DakotaDome; Vermillion, SD		W 34–7	5,247
September 18	7:00 p.m.	at Cal Poly*		Alex G. Spanos Stadium; San Luis Obispo, CA		W 48–14	11,075
September 25	7:00 p.m.	at No. 18 Missouri State		Robert W. Plaster Stadium; Springfield, MO		L 23–31	12,738
October 2	2:00 p.m.	Indiana State^{†}		DakotaDome; Vermillion, SD		W 38–10	6,267
October 9	2:00 p.m.	No. 13 North Dakota		DakotaDome; Vermillion, SD (Sitting Bull Trophy)	ESPN+	W 20–13	5,304
October 16	4:00 p.m.	at No. 16 Northern Iowa	No. 21	UNI-Dome; Cedar Falls, IA		W 34–21	7,202
October 23	1:00 p.m.	Illinois State	No. 15	DakotaDome; Vermillion, SD	ESPN+	L 14–20	5,415
November 6	12:00 p.m.	at Western Illinois	No. 23	Hanson Field; Macomb, IL	ESPN+	W 42–21	1,972
November 13	1:00 p.m.	No. 4 South Dakota State	No. 19	DakotaDome; Vermillion, SD (rivalry)		W 23–20	9,068
November 20	2:30 p.m.	at No. 4 North Dakota State	No. 16	Fargodome; Fargo, ND		L 24–52	16,252
November 27	5:00 p.m.	No. 21 Southern Illinois*	No. 17	DakotaDome; Vermillion, SD (NCAA Division I First Round)	ESPN+	L 10–22	3,597
*Non-conference game; ^{†}Homecoming; Rankings from STATS Poll released prior to the game; All times are in Central time

== Game summaries ==
=== At Kansas ===
South Dakota Coyotes (0–0) vs. Kansas Jayhawks (0–0)

Quarter	1	2	3	4	Total
South Dakota	0	0	7	7	14
Kansas	0	7	3	7	17

at David Booth Kansas Memorial Stadium • Lawrence, KS

- Date: Friday, September 3, 2021
- Game time: 7:00 p.m. CDT
- Game weather: sunny • Temperature: 80°F
- Game attendance: 26,103
- Referee: Derek Anderson
- TV announcers (ESPN+): Mark Neely, Barrett Brooks

Game information

Second Quarter

- (0:24) KAN – Lawrence Arnold 8 yard pass from Jason Bean, Jacob Borcila kick (Drive: 7 plays, 37 yards, 3:18; KAN 7–0)

Third Quarter

- (6:57) KAN – Jacob Borcila 30 yard field goal (Drive: 13 plays, 50 yards, 6:10; KAN 10–0)
- (3:31) SD – Shomari Lawrence 29 yard rush, Mason Lorber kick (Drive: 9 plays, 75 yards, 3:23, KAN 10–7)

Fourth Quarter

- (5:13) SD – Travis Theis 25 yard rush, Mason Lorber kick (Drive: 3 plays, 46 yards, 1:01; SD 14–10)
- (1:10) KAN – Lawrence Arnold 16 yard pass from Jason Bean, Jacob Borcila kick (Drive: 11 plays, 64 yards, 3:56; KAN 17–14)

Statistics	SD	KAN
First downs	14	12
Total yards	262	245
Rushes/yards	41/164	41/82
Passing yards	98	163
Passing: Comp–Att–Int	10–22–0	17–26–0
Time of possession	25:52	34:08

Team	Category	Player	Statistics
South Dakota	Passing	Carson Camp	10–22, 98 yards
South Dakota	Rushing	Travis Theis	18 carries, 96 yards
South Dakota	Receiving	Kody Case	2 receptions, 37 yards
Kansas	Passing	Jason Bean	17–26, 163 yards, 2 TD
Kansas	Rushing	Jason Bean	15 carries, 54 yards
Kansas	Receiving	Mason Fairchild	4 receptions, 58 yards

=== Northern Arizona ===
	1	2	3	4	Total
Lumberjacks	0	0	7	0	7
Coyotes	17	10	7	0	34

=== at Cal Poly ===
	1	2	3	4	Total
Coyotes	21	20	0	7	48
Mustangs	7	0	0	7	14

=== at No. 18 Missouri State ===
Game Four: South Dakota Coyotes (2–1) at #18 Missouri State Bears (1–1)

Quarter	1	2	3	4	Total
South Dakota	14	9	0	0	23
No. 18 Missouri State	7	7	3	14	31

at Plaster Stadium • Springfield, MO

- Date: Saturday, September 25, 2021
- Game time: 7:05 p.m. CDT
- Game weather: 71 °F (22 °C), Winds N NE 1 mph; Clear and Cool
- Game attendance: 12,738
- Referee: Aaron Adams • Umpire: Keith Wohlers • Linesman: John Winter • Line judge: Scott Landy • Back judge: Kurt Dingmann • Field judge: Brad Brunet • Side judge: Leanne Surmin
- TV announcers (ESPN3): Scott Warmann, Danan Hughes, Kelly Burke
- Box Score

Game information

First Quarter

- (12:19) USD - Travis Theis 8 yard run, Mason Lorber kick (Drive: 1 play, 21 yards, 00:08; USD 0-7)
- (09:28) USD - Kody Case 21 yard pass from Carson Camp, Mason Lorber kick (Drive: 1 play, 21 yards, 00:08; USD 0-14)
- (05:38) MSU - Jason Shelley 26 yard run, Jose Pizano kick (Drive: 7 plays, 75 yards, 03:50; MSU 7-14)

Second Quarter

- (01:52) MSU - Ty Scott 46 yard pass from Jason Shelley, Jose Pizano kick (Drive: 1 play, 46 yards, 00:08; TIED 14-14)
- (01:38) USD - Wesley Eliodor 99 yard kickoff return, Mason Lorber kick blocked (USD 20-14)
- (00:00) USD - Mason Lorber 27 yard field goal (Drive: 7 plays, 66 yards, 1:05; USD 23-14)

Third Quarter

- (10:21) MSU - Jose Pizano 42 yard field goal (Drive: 9 plays, 49 yards, 4:31; USD 23-17)

Fourth Quarter

- (13:02) MSU - Kevon Latulas 3 yard pass from Jason Shelley, Jose Pizano kick (Drive: 12 plays, 74 yards, 6:19; MSU 23-24)
- (04:42) MSU - Jason Shelley 12 yard run, Jose Pizano kick (Drive: 4 plays, 27 yards, 1:34; MSU 23-31)

Statistics	USD	MSU
First downs	14	22
Total yards	361	439
Rushes/yards	33/ 130	46/ 158
Passing yards	231	281
Passing: Comp–Att–Int	12-29-2	19-29-0
Time of possession	24:11	35:49

Team	Category	Player	Statistics
South Dakota	Passing	Carson Camp	12/29, 231 yards, 1 TD, 2 INT
South Dakota	Rushing	Nate Thomas	4 carries, 60 yards
South Dakota	Receiving	Carter Bell	3 catches, 102 yards
Missouri State	Passing	Jason Shelley	19/29, 281 yards, 2 TD
Missouri State	Rushing	Tobias Little	14 carries, 71 yards
Missouri State	Receiving	Ty Scott	7 catches, 111 yards, 1 TD

=== at No. 4 North Dakota State ===
South Dakota Coyotes (7-3) vs. North Dakota State Bison (9-1)

Quarter	1	2	3	4	Total
No. 16 Coyotes	0	3	14	7	24
No. 4 Bison	21	7	10	14	52

at Fargodome, Fargo, ND

- Date: November 20, 2021
- Game time: 2:30 p.m. (CT)
- Game weather: Indoors; 70 °F (21 °C)
- Game attendance: 16,252
- TV: ESPN+

Statistics	South Dakota	North Dakota State
First downs	15	27
Plays–yards	54-293	70-522
Rushes–yards	27-97	47-303
Passing yards	196	219
Passing: comp–att–int	21-27-1	19-23-0
Time of possession	24:01	35:59

Team	Category	Player	Statistics
South Dakota	Passing	Carson Camp	21/27, 196 yds, 2 TD, 1 INT
South Dakota	Rushing	Nate Thomas	12 car, 60 yds
South Dakota	Receiving	Jeremiah Webb	3 rec, 54 yds
North Dakota State	Passing	Cam Miller	19/23, 219 yds, TD
North Dakota State	Rushing	Jalen Bussey	5 car, 62 yds, TD
North Dakota State	Receiving	Phoenix Sproles	2 rec, 87 yds, TD

Scoring summary

Quarter	Time	Drive			Team	Scoring information	Score	
Quarter	Time	Plays	Yards	TOP	Team	Scoring information	USD	NDSU
1st	6:46	12	62	5:37	NDSU	TaMerik Williams (#22) 1-yard touchdown run, Jake Reinholz (#37) kick good	0	7
1st	5:17	1	75	0:12	NDSU	Phoenix Sproles (#11) 75-yard touchdown reception from Cam Miller (#7), Jake Reinholz (#37) kick good	0	14
1st	0:18	6	49	3:06	NDSU	Cam Miller (#7) 8-yard touchdown run, Jake Reinholz (#37) kick good	0	21
2nd	12:00	1	43	0:11	NDSU	Christian Watson (#1) 43-yard touchdown run, Jake Reinholz (#37) kick good	0	28
2nd	6:20	11	71	5:35	USD	25-yard field goal by Mason Lorber (#31)	3	28
3rd	12:42				USD	Punt returned 47 yards for touchdown by Carter Bell (#14), Mason Lorber (#31) kick good	10	28
3rd	10:01	7	36	2:34	NDSU	30-yard field goal by Jake Reinholz (#37)	10	31
3rd	4:05	9	55	4:08	NDSU	TaMerik Williams (#22) 8-yard touchdown run, Jake Reinholz (#37) kick good	10	38
3rd	3:15	4	75	0:50	USD	Mike Mansaray (#21) 40-yard touchdown reception from Carson Camp (#18), Mason Lorber (#31) kick good	17	38
4th	14:26	7	65	3:49	NDSU	Jalen Bussey (#21) 20-yard touchdown run, Jake Reinholz (#37) kick good	17	45
4th	10:48	7	31	3:32	NDSU	Kobe Johnson (#4) 2-yard touchdown run, Jake Reinholz (#37) kick good	17	52
4th	5:28	13	75	5:20	USD	JJ Galbreath (#82) 8-yard touchdown reception from Carson Camp (#18), Mason Lorber (#31) kick good	24	52
"TOP" = time of possession. For other American football terms, see Glossary of American football.							24	52
