= 2021 Youngstown State Penguins football team =

American college football season

2021 Youngstown State Penguins football
- Conference: Missouri Valley Football Conference
- Record: 3–7 (2–6 MVFC)
- Head coach: Doug Phillips (2nd season)
- Offensive coordinator: Troy Rothenbuhler (2nd season)
- Offensive scheme: Multiple
- Defensive coordinator: Joe Schaefer (2nd season)
- Base defense: 4–2–5
- Home stadium: Stambaugh Stadium

2021 Missouri Valley Football Conference standings
	Conf.			Overall
Team	W		L	W		L
No. 1 North Dakota State $^	7	–	1	14	–	1
No. 14 Missouri State ^	6	–	2	8	–	4
No. 16 Southern Illinois ^	5	–	3	8	–	5
No. 18 South Dakota ^	5	–	3	7	–	5
No. 4 South Dakota State ^	5	–	3	11	–	4
No. 23 Northern Iowa ^	4	–	4	6	–	6
Indiana State	3	–	5	5	–	6
North Dakota	3	–	5	5	–	6
Western Illinois	2	–	6	2	–	9
Illinois State	2	–	6	4	–	7
Youngstown State	2	–	6	3	–	7
$ – Conference champion; ^ – FCS playoff participant; Rankings from STATS Poll

The 2021 Youngstown State Penguins football team represented Youngstown State University as a member of the Missouri Valley Football Conference (MVFC) during the 2021 NCAA Division I FCS football season. Led by second-year head coach Doug Phillips, the Penguins compiled an overall record of 3–7 with a mark of 2–6 in conference play, tying for ninth place in the MVFC. Youngstown State played their home games at Stambaugh Stadium in Youngstown, Ohio.

== Schedule ==
Date	Time	Opponent	Site	TV	Result	Attendance
September 2	7:00 p.m.	Incarnate Word*	Stambaugh Stadium; Youngstown, OH	ESPN+	W 44–41 ^{OT}	8,637
September 11	12:00 p.m.	at Michigan State*	Spartan Stadium; East Lansing, MI	BTN	L 14–42	70,103
September 25	6:00 p.m.	Western Illinois	Stambaugh Stadium; Youngstown, OH	ESPN+	L 35–38	13,751
October 2	5:00 p.m.	at No. 15 Northern Iowa	UNI-Dome; Cedar Falls, IA	ESPN+	L 7–34	8,771
October 9	2:00 p.m.	No. 16 Missouri State^{†}	Stambaugh Stadium; Youngstown, OH	ESPN+	W 41–33	12,444
October 23	1:00 p.m.	at Indiana State	Memorial Stadium; Terre Haute, Indiana	ESPN+	L 17–28	5,479
October 30	2:00 p.m.	No. 10 South Dakota State	Stambaugh Stadium; Youngstown, OH	ESPN+	L 16–47	9,423
November 6	1:00 p.m.	at North Dakota	Alerus Center; Grand Forks, ND	ESPN+	L 21–24	8,441
November 13	12:00 p.m.	No. 5 North Dakota State	Stambaugh Stadium; Youngstown, OH	ESPN+	L 17–49	8,307
November 20	1:00 p.m.	at No. 17 Southern Illinois	Saluki Stadium; Carbondale, IL	ESPN+	W 35-18	4,935
*Non-conference game; ^{†}Homecoming; Rankings from STATS Poll released prior to the game; All times are in Eastern time

== Game summaries ==
=== vs Incarnate Word ===
Incarnate Word Cardinals at Youngstown State Penguins

Quarter	1	2	3	4	OT	Total
Cardinals	7	14	13	7	0	41
Penguins	14	10	7	10	3	44

at Stambaugh Stadium, Youngstown, OH

- Date: September 2
- Game time: 7:00 p.m. EDT
- Game weather: Temperature: 69 • Wind: E 7 mph • Weather: Sunny
- Game attendance: 8,637
- Referee: Art Brown
- TV announcers (ESPN+): Drae Smith (play-by-play), Chris Sammarone (analyst)

Game information

First Quarter

- YSU – 6:22 Bryce Oliver 5 yard pass from Demeatric Crenshaw, Colt McFadden kick
  YSU 7–0 Drive: 8 plays, 80 yards, 4:12
- YSU – 4:34 Demeatric Crenshaw 3 yard run, Colt McFadden kick
  YSU 14–0 Drive: 4 plays, 30 yards, 0:56
- UIW – 0:56 Kevin Brown 29 yard run, Carson Mohr kick
  YSU 14–7 Drive: 8 plays, 75 yards, 3:38

Second Quarter

- YSU – 10:21 Colt McFadden 27 yard field goal
  YSU 17–7 Drive: 11 plays, 40 yards, 5:26
- UIW – 8:56 Darion Chafin 38 yard pass from Cam Ward, Carson Mohr kick
  YSU 17–14 Drive: 4 plays, 75 yards, 1:25
- UIW – 4:18 Taylor Grimes 9 yard pass from Cameron Ward, Carson Mohr kick
  UIW 21–17 Drive: 7 plays, 60 yards, 2:27
- YSU – 2:20 Jaleel McLaughlin 72 yard run, Colt McFadden kick
  YSU 24–21 Drive: 4 plays, 82 yards, 1:54

Third Quarter

- YSU – 7:00 Jaleel McLaughlin 11 yard run, Colt McFadden kick
  YSU 31–21 Drive: 15 plays, 82 yards, 7:55
- UIW – 3:49 Kevin Brown 1 yard run, Carson Mohr kick failed
  YSU 31–27 Drive: 10 plays, 74 yards, 3:05
- UIW – 0:48 Darion Chafin 20 yard pass from Cameron Ward, John Scifers kick
  UIW 34–31 Drive: 5 plays, 34 yards, 0:54

Fourth Quarter

- YSU – 2:15 Demeatric Crenshaw 9 yard run, Colt McFadden kick
  YSU 38–34 Drive: 5 plays, 30 yards, 2:17
- UIW – 0:39 Trevor Begue 2 yard pass from Cameron Ward, John Scifers kick
  UIW 41–38 Drive: 8 plays, 75 yards, 1:36
- YSU – 0:00 Colt McFadden 41 yard field goal
  Tied 41–41 Drive: 4 plays, 75 yards, 1:25

Overtime

- YSU – 0:00 Colt McFadden 27 yard field goal
  YSU 44–41 Drive: 5 plays, 15 yards, 0:00

Passing

- UIW – Cam Ward 28/47, 352 YDS, 4 TD
- YSU – Demeatric Crenshaw 9/12, 112 YDS, 1 TD

Rushing

- UIW – Kevin Brown 19 ATT, 118 YDS, 2 TD
- YSU – Jaleel McLaughlin 29 ATT, 242 YDS, 2 TD

Receiving

- UIW – Trevor Begue 5 REC, 81 YDS, 1 TD
- YSU – Jaleel McLaughlin 2 REC, 46 YDS

=== at Michigan State ===
Youngstown State Penguins (1–0) at Michigan State Spartans (1–0) – Game summary

Quarter	1	2	3	4	Total
Penguins	0	7	7	0	14
Spartans	14	21	7	0	42

at Spartan Stadium • East Lansing, MI

- Date: September 11, 2021
- Game time: 12:01 p.m.
- Game weather: 75°F, Wind: 7 mph N, Sunny
- Game attendance: 70,103
- Referee: Kole Kunueppel
- TV announcers (BTN): Lisa Byington (play-by-play), Anthony Herron (analyst), Coley Harvey (sideline)
- Sources

Game information

First Quarter

- (14:50) MSU TD: Jayden Reed 75-yard pass from Payton Thorne (Matt Coghlin kick)
  MSU 7–0; 1 plays, 75 yards, 0:10
- (07:54) MSU TD: Payton Thorne 10-yard run (Matt Coghlin kick)
  MSU 14–0; 6 plays, 58 yard, 2:01

Second Quarter

- (12:52) MSU TD: Jayden Reed 85-yard pass from Payton Thorne (Matt Coghlin kick)
  MSU 21–0; 3 plays, 98 yards, 1:07
- (10:12) MSU TD: Elijah Collins 20-yard pass from Payton Thorne (Matt Coghlin kick)
  MSU 28–-0; 4 plays, 52 yards 1:51
- (04:10) YSU TD: Demeatric Crenshaw 6-yard run (Colt McFadden kick)
  MSU 28–7; 12 plays, 75 yards, 6:02
- (00:17) MSU TD: Kenneth Walker III 6-yard run (Matt Coghlin kick)
  MSU 35–7; 11 plays, 68 yards, 3:47

Third Quarter

- (10:54) YSU TD: Christian Turner 26-yard run (Colt McFadden kick)
  MSU 35–14; 10 plays, 75 yards, 4:06
- (04:32) MSU TD: Jalen Nailor 16-yard pass from Payton Thorne (Matt Coghlin kick)
  MSU 42–14; 6 plays, 45 yards, 2:07

Passing

- YSU – Demeatric Crenshaw: 10/23, 81 yards, 1 INT
- MSU – Payton Thorne: 15/21, 280 yards, 4 TD

Rushing

- YSU – Demeatric Crenshaw: 18 carries, 78 yards, 1 TD
- MSU – Jordon Simmons: 16 carries, 123 yards

Receiving

- YSU – Luke Hensley, 4 receptions, 35 yards
- MSU – Jayden Reed: 4 receptions, 181 yards, 2 TD

=== vs No. 16 Missouri State ===
Game Five: #16 Missouri State Bears (3–1) at Youngstown State Penguins (1–3)

Quarter	1	2	3	4	Total
No. 16 Missouri State	0	3	7	23	33
Youngstown State	6	11	3	21	41

at Stambaugh Stadium • Youngstown, OH

- Date: Saturday, October 9, 2021
- Game time: 2:00 p.m. EDT
- Game weather: 64 °F (18 °C), Winds W 10 mph; Sunny
- Game attendance: 12,444
- Referee: Art Brown • Umpire: Joel Schult • Linesman: Frank Spryszak • Line judge: Brett Carpenter • Back judge: Chris Curry • Field judge: Marcus Cameron • Side judge: Jared Flesch
- TV announcers (ESPN+): Drae Smith and Chris Sammarone

Game information

First Quarter

- (12:28) YSU - Samuel St. Surin 28 yard pass from Demeatric Crenshaw, PAT failed (Drive: 2 plays, 44 yards, 00:36; YSU 6-0)

Second Quarter

- (10:56) YSU - Colt McFadden 45 yard field goal (Drive: 13 plays, 72 yards, 05:47; YSU 9-0)
- (07:06) MSU - Jose Pizano 36 yard field goal (Drive: 9 plays, 56 yards, 03:50; YSU 9-3)
- (00:12) YSU - Jorge Portorreal 8 yard pass from Demeatric Crenshaw, 2pt conversion good (Drive: 11 plays, 66 yards, 03:53; YSU 17-3)

Third Quarter

- (11:47) MSU - Ty Scott 21 yard pass from Jason Shelley, Jose Pizano kick (Drive: 7 plays, 82 yards, 03:08; YSU 17-10)
- (03:16) YSU - Colt McFadden 28 yard field goal (Drive: 10 plays, 56 yards, 05:51; YSU 20-10)

Fourth Quarter

- (10:02) MSU - Jose Pizano 32 yard field goal (Drive: 8 plays, 65 yards, 02:43; YSU 20-13)
- (04:38) MSU - Ron Tiavaasue 7 yard pass from Jason Shelley, Jose Pizano kick (Drive: 11 plays, 71 yards, 03:58; TIED 20-20)
- (04:17) YSU - Jaleel McLaughlin 22 yard run, Colt McFadden kick (Drive: 1 play, 22 yards, 00:06; YSU 27-20)
- (02:08) YSU - Jaleel McLaughlin 60 yard run, Colt McFadden kick (Drive: 2 plays, 75 yards, 00:49; YSU 34-20)
- (01:06) MSU - Ty Scott 27 yard pass from Jason Shelley, Jose Pizano kick (Drives: 6 plays, 68 yards, 00:56 YSU 34-27)
- (00:40) YSU - Demeatric Crenshaw 73 yard run, Colt McFadden kick (Drive: 3 plays, 80 yards, 00:24; YSU 41-27)
- (00:00) MSU - Cairo Payne 12 yard pass from Jason Shelley, No PAT (Drive: 6 plays, 75 yards, 00:40; YSU 41-33)

Statistics	MSU	YSU
First downs	30	21
Total yards	503	476
Rushes/yards	27/131	50/377
Passing yards	372	99
Passing: Comp–Att–Int	27-49-2	10-19-0
Time of possession	26:47	33:13

Team	Category	Player	Statistics
Missouri State	Passing	Jason Shelley	27/48, 372 yards, 4 TD, 2 INT
Missouri State	Rushing	Jason Shelley	11 carries, 93 yards
Missouri State	Receiving	Ty Scott	8 catches, 121 yards, 2 TD
Youngstown State	Passing	Demeatric Crenshaw	10/19, 99 yards, 2 TD
Youngstown State	Rushing	Demeatric Crenshaw	22 carries, 202 yards, 1 TD
Youngstown State	Receiving	Samuel St. Surin	2 catches, 39 yards, 1 TD

=== vs No. 5 North Dakota State ===
North Dakota State Bison (8-1) vs. Youngstown State Penguins (2-6)

Quarter	1	2	3	4	Total
No. 5 Bison	7	14	14	14	49
Penguins	0	3	7	7	17

at Stambaugh Stadium, Youngstown, OH

- Date: November 13, 2021
- Game time: 12:00 p.m. (ET)
- Game weather: Cloudy; 39 °F (4 °C); NE 10 mph
- Game attendance: 8,307
- TV: ESPN+

Statistics	North Dakota State	Youngstown State
First downs	20	13
Plays–yards	59-623	65-288
Rushes–yards	45-454	32-59
Passing yards	169	229
Passing: comp–att–int	10-14-0	17-33-1
Turnovers		
Time of possession	29:14	30:46

Team	Category	Player	Statistics
North Dakota State	Passing	Cam Miller	10/14, 169 yds, 2 TD
North Dakota State	Rushing	TK Marshall	3 car, 146 yds, TD
North Dakota State	Receiving	Christian Watson	4 rec, 91 yds, TD
Youngstown State	Passing	Mitch Davidson	10/22, 166 yds, 2 TD, INT
Youngstown State	Rushing	Jaleel McLaughlin	11 car, 52 yds
Youngstown State	Receiving	Drew Ogletree	5 rec, 70 yds

Scoring summary

Quarter	Time	Drive			Team	Scoring information	Score	
Quarter	Time	Plays	Yards	TOP	Team	Scoring information	NDSU	YSU
1st	11:45	7	69	3:06	NDSU	Hunter Luepke (#44) 49-yard touchdown run, Jake Reinholz (#37) kick good	7	0
2nd	10:52	16	80	8:08	NDSU	TaMerik Williams (#22) 1-yard touchdown run, Jake Reinholz (#37) kick good	14	0
2nd	6::48	9	49	4:04	YSU	44-yard field goal by Colt McFadden (#19)	14	3
2nd	6:29	1	71	0:12	NDSU	Christian Watson (#1) 71-yard touchdown reception from Cam Miller (#7), Jake Reinholz (#37) kick good	21	3
3rd	13:16	1	50	0:11	NDSU	TaMerik Williams (#22) 50-yard touchdown run, Jake Reinholz (#37) kick good	28	3
3rd	4:07	8	70	4:07	NDSU	Noah Gindorff (#87) 1-yard touchdown reception from Cam Miller (#7), Jake Reinholz (#37) kick good	35	3
3rd	1:04	8	77	2:56	YSU	Bryce Oliver (#0) 2-yard touchdown reception from Mitch Davidson (#14), Colt McFadden (#19) kick good	35	10
4th	10:19	8	60	3:57	YSU	Bryce Oliver (#0) 2-yard touchdown reception from Mitch Davidson (#14), Colt McFadden (#19) kick good	35	17
4th	5:44	2	65	0:44	NDSU	Jalen Bussey (#21) 61-yard touchdown run, Jake Reinholz (#37) kick good	42	17
4th	1:21	2	86	0:58	NDSU	TK Marshall (#28) 84-yard touchdown run, Jake Reinholz (#37) kick good	49	17
"TOP" = time of possession. For other American football terms, see Glossary of American football.							49	17
