= 2021 Western Illinois Leathernecks football team =

American college football season

2021 Western Illinois Leathernecks football
- Conference: Missouri Valley Football Conference
- Record: 2–9 (2–6 MVFC)
- Head coach: Jared Elliott (4th season)
- Offensive coordinator: David Rocco (4th season)
- Defensive coordinator: Cam Clark (2nd season)
- Home stadium: Hanson Field

2021 Missouri Valley Football Conference standings
| | Conf. | | | Overall |
| Team | W | | L | W | | L |
|---|---|---|---|---|---|---|
| No. 1 North Dakota State $^ | 7 | – | 1 | 14 | – | 1 |
| No. 14 Missouri State ^ | 6 | – | 2 | 8 | – | 4 |
| No. 16 Southern Illinois ^ | 5 | – | 3 | 8 | – | 5 |
| No. 18 South Dakota ^ | 5 | – | 3 | 7 | – | 5 |
| No. 4 South Dakota State ^ | 5 | – | 3 | 11 | – | 4 |
| No. 23 Northern Iowa ^ | 4 | – | 4 | 6 | – | 6 |
| Indiana State | 3 | – | 5 | 5 | – | 6 |
| North Dakota | 3 | – | 5 | 5 | – | 6 |
| Western Illinois | 2 | – | 6 | 2 | – | 9 |
| Illinois State | 2 | – | 6 | 4 | – | 7 |
| Youngstown State | 2 | – | 6 | 3 | – | 7 |
$ – Conference champion; ^ – FCS playoff participant; Rankings from STATS Poll

The 2021 Western Illinois Leathernecks football team represented Western Illinois University as a member of the Missouri Valley Football Conference (MVFC) during the 2021 NCAA Division I FCS football season. Led by Jared Elliott in his fourth and final season as head coach, the Leathernecks compiled an overall record of 2–9 with a mark of 2–6 in conference play, placing in a three-way tie for ninth place at the bottom of the MVFC standings. Western Illinois played home games at Hanson Field in Macomb, Illinois.

== Schedule ==
| Date | Time | Opponent | Site | TV | Result | Attendance |
|---|---|---|---|---|---|---|
| September 2 | 7:00 p.m. | at Ball State* | Scheumann Stadium; Muncie, IN | ESPN+ | L 21–31 | 13,149 |
| September 11 | 7:00 p.m. | at No. 4 Montana* | Washington–Grizzly Stadium; Missoula, MT | ESPN+ | L 7–42 | 25,238 |
| September 18 | 3:00 p.m. | No. 7 Eastern Washington* | Hanson Field; Macomb, IL | ESPN+ | L 56–62 | 5,385 |
| September 25 | 6:00 p.m. | at Youngstown State | Stambaugh Stadium; Youngstown, OH | ESPN3 | W 38–35 | 13,751 |
| October 2 | 3:00 p.m. | No. 7 Southern Illinois | Hanson Field; Macomb, IL | ESPN+ | L 30–31 ^{OT} | 4,107 |
| October 9 | 1:00 p.m. | at Indiana State | Memorial Stadium; Terre Haute, IN | ESPN3 | L 27–37 | 3,943 |
| October 16 | 12:00 p.m. | No. 7 South Dakota State | Hanson Field; Macomb, IL | ESPN+ | L 17–41 | 2,827 |
| October 23 | 2:00 p.m. | at North Dakota | Alerus Center; Grand Forks, ND | ESPN+ | L 10–34 | 8,807 |
| October 30 | 3:00 p.m. | Illinois State | Hanson Field; Macomb, IL | ESPN3 | W 38–31 | 2,118 |
| November 6 | 12:00 p.m. | No. 23 South Dakota | Hanson Field; Macomb, IL | ESPN+ | L 21–42 | 1,972 |
| November 20 | 1:00 p.m. | at Northern Iowa | UNI-Dome; Cedar Falls, IA | ESPN3 | L 3-41 | 6,785 |
*Non-conference game; Rankings from STATS Poll released prior to the game
