= 2021 Indiana State Sycamores football team =

American college football season

2021 Indiana State Sycamores football
- Conference: Missouri Valley Football Conference
- Record: 5–6 (3–5 MVFC)
- Head coach: Curt Mallory (4th season)
- Offensive coordinator: Michael Switzer (2nd season)
- Defensive coordinator: Brad Wilson (4th season)
- Home stadium: Memorial Stadium

2021 Missouri Valley Football Conference standings
	Conf.			Overall
Team	W		L	W		L
No. 1 North Dakota State $^	7	–	1	14	–	1
No. 14 Missouri State ^	6	–	2	8	–	4
No. 16 Southern Illinois ^	5	–	3	8	–	5
No. 18 South Dakota ^	5	–	3	7	–	5
No. 4 South Dakota State ^	5	–	3	11	–	4
No. 23 Northern Iowa ^	4	–	4	6	–	6
Indiana State	3	–	5	5	–	6
North Dakota	3	–	5	5	–	6
Western Illinois	2	–	6	2	–	9
Illinois State	2	–	6	4	–	7
Youngstown State	2	–	6	3	–	7
$ – Conference champion; ^ – FCS playoff participant; Rankings from STATS Poll

The 2021 Indiana State Sycamores football team represented Indiana State University as a member of the Missouri Valley Football Conference (MVFC) for the 2021 NCAA Division I FCS football season. Led by fourth-year head coach Curt Mallory, the Sycamores compiled an overall record of 5–6 with a mark of 3–5 in conference play, tying for seventh place in the MVFC. Indiana State played home games at Memorial Stadium in Terre Haute, Indiana.

== Schedule ==
Date	Time	Opponent	Site	TV	Result	Attendance
August 28	6:00 p.m.	Eastern Illinois*	Memorial Stadium; Terre Haute, IN	ESPN+	W 26–21	5,540
September 11	12:00 p.m.	at Northwestern*	Ryan Field; Evanston, IL	BTN	L 6–24	26,181
September 18	7:00 p.m.	at Eastern Kentucky*	Roy Kidd Stadium; Richmond, KY	ESPN+	W 23–21	4,550
September 25	1:00 p.m.	No. 2 South Dakota State	Memorial Stadium; Terre Haute, IN		L 0–44	6,652
October 2	3:00 p.m.	at South Dakota	DakotaDome; Vermillion, SD		L 10–38	6,267
October 9	1:00 p.m.	Western Illinois	Memorial Stadium; Terre Haute, IN	ESPN+	W 37–27	3,943
October 16	3:00 p.m.	at No. 20 Missouri State	Robert W. Plaster Stadium; Springfield, MO	ESPN+	L 7–37	14,336
October 23	1:00 p.m.	Youngstown State^{†}	Memorial Stadium; Terre Haute, IN	ESPN+	W 28–17	5,479
October 30	3:30 p.m.	at No. 2 North Dakota State	Fargodome; Fargo, ND	ESPN+	L 2–44	14,383
November 13	1:00 p.m.	No. 15 Southern Illinois	Memorial Stadium; Terre Haute, IN	ESPN3	L 21-47	3,265
November 20	1:00 p.m.	at Illinois State	Hancock Stadium; Normal, IL	Marquee	W 15-10	2,890
*Non-conference game; ^{†}Homecoming; Rankings from STATS Poll released prior to the game; All times are in Eastern time
