= 2021 Illinois State Redbirds football team =

American college football season

2021 Illinois State Redbirds football
- Conference: Missouri Valley Football Conference
- Record: 4–7 (2–6 MVFC)
- Head coach: Brock Spack (13th season)
- Co-offensive coordinators: C. J. Irvin (2nd season); Ghaali Muhammad-Lankford (2nd season)
- Defensive coordinator: Travis Niekamp (4th season)
- MVPs: Cole Mueller; Jacob Powell
- Captains: Bryce Jefferson; Zeke Vandenburgh; JT Bohlken
- Home stadium: Hancock Stadium

2021 Missouri Valley Football Conference standings
	Conf.			Overall
Team	W		L	W		L
No. 1 North Dakota State $^	7	–	1	14	–	1
No. 14 Missouri State ^	6	–	2	8	–	4
No. 16 Southern Illinois ^	5	–	3	8	–	5
No. 18 South Dakota ^	5	–	3	7	–	5
No. 4 South Dakota State ^	5	–	3	11	–	4
No. 23 Northern Iowa ^	4	–	4	6	–	6
Indiana State	3	–	5	5	–	6
North Dakota	3	–	5	5	–	6
Western Illinois	2	–	6	2	–	9
Illinois State	2	–	6	4	–	7
Youngstown State	2	–	6	3	–	7
$ – Conference champion; ^ – FCS playoff participant; Rankings from STATS Poll

The 2021 Illinois State Redbirds football team represented Illinois State University as a member of the Missouri Valley Football Conference (MVFC) during the 2021 NCAA Division I FCS football season. Led by 13th-year head coach Brock Spack, the Redbirds compiled an overall record of 4–7 with a mark of 2–6 in conference play, placing in a three-way tie for ninth in the MVFC. Illinois State played home games at Hancock Stadium in Normal, Illinois.

== Schedule ==
Date	Time	Opponent	Site	TV	Result	Attendance
September 4	6:30 p.m.	Butler*	Hancock Stadium; Normal, IL	Marquee / ESPN3	W 49–7	8,148
September 11	4:00 p.m.	at Western Michigan*	Waldo Stadium; Kalamazoo, MI	ESPN3	L 0–28	18,122
September 18	6:00 p.m.	at Eastern Illinois*	O'Brien Field; Charleston, IL (Mid-America Classic)	ESPN+	W 31–24	6,424
September 25	2:00 pm	at No. 7 Southern Illinois	Saluki Stadium; Carbondale, IL	ESPN+	L 17–35	8,618
October 2	1:00 p.m.	No. 16 Missouri State	Hancock Stadium; Normal, IL	Marquee / ESPN+	L 20–41	0
October 16	2:00 p.m.	No. 3 North Dakota State^{†}	Hancock Stadium; Normal, IL	Marquee / ESPN+	L 0–20	12,416
October 23	1:00 p.m.	at No. 15 South Dakota	DakotaDome; Vermillion, SD	ESPN+	W 20–14	5,415
October 30	3:00 p.m.	at Western Illinois	Hanson Field; Macomb, IL	ESPN3	L 31–38	2,118
November 6	12:00 p.m.	No. 13 Northern Iowa	Hancock Stadium; Normal, IL	Marquee / ESPN+	W 17–10 ^{OT}	6,000
November 13	2:00 p.m.	at North Dakota	Alerus Center; Grand Forks, ND	ESPN+	L 7–14	6,141
November 20	12:00 p.m.	Indiana State	Hancock Stadium; Normal, IL	Marquee / ESPN+	L 10-15	2,890
*Non-conference game; ^{†}Homecoming; Rankings from STATS Poll released prior to the game; All times are in Central time
