= Jayden Price =

American football player (born 2000)

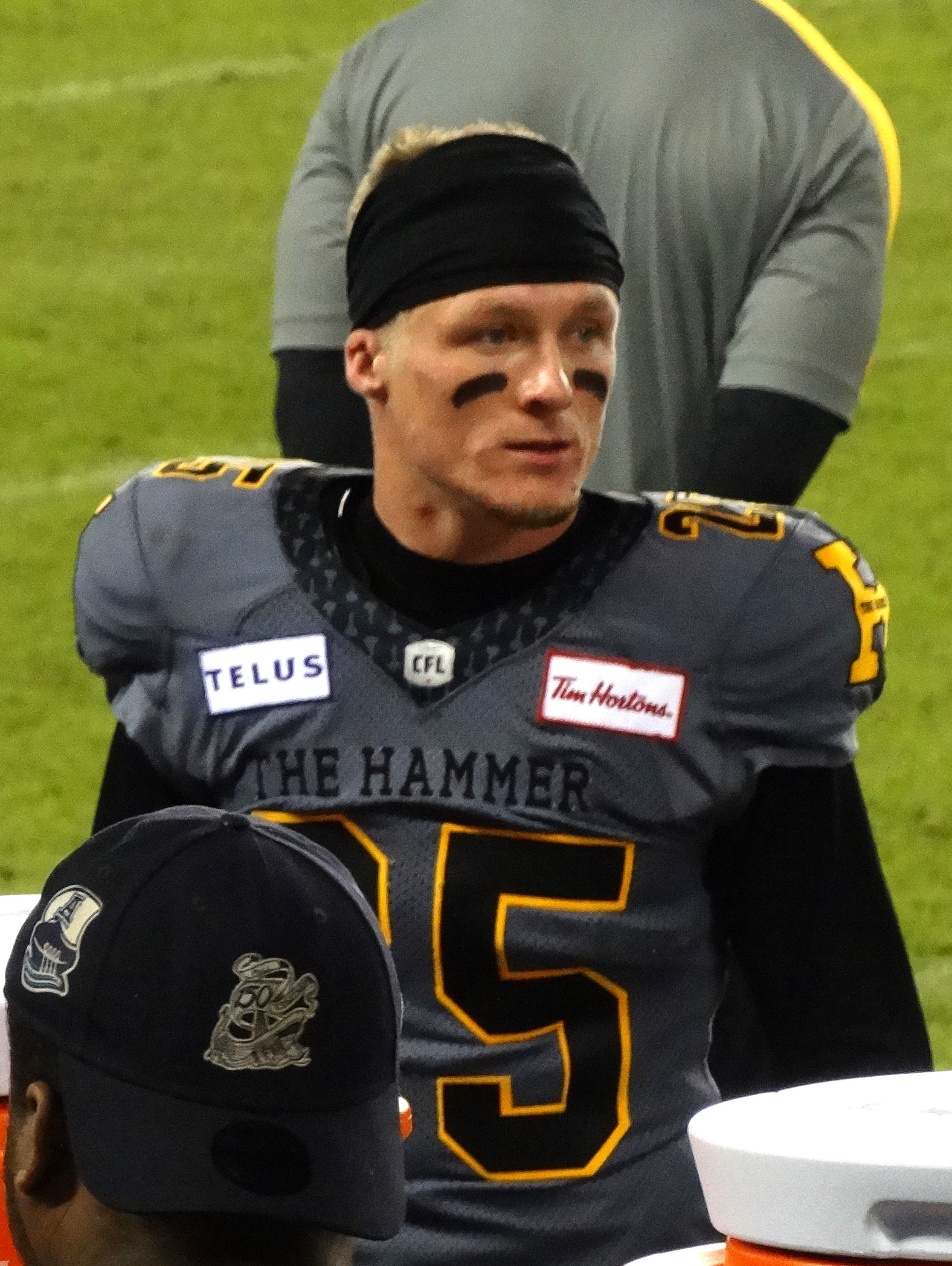
- Price with the Hamilton Tiger-Cats in 2024

No. 38 – New Orleans Saints
- Position: Cornerback
- Roster status: Practice squad

Personal information
- Born: April 5, 2000 (age 26); Derby, Kansas, U.S.
- Listed height: 5 ft 11 in (1.80 m)
- Listed weight: 185 lb (84 kg)

Career information
- High school: Mulvane (Mulvane, Kansas)
- College: North Dakota State (2018–2023)
- NFL draft: 2024: undrafted

Career history
- Atlanta Falcons (2024)*; Hamilton Tiger-Cats (2024); Birmingham Stallions (2025)*; Arlington Renegades (2025); New Orleans Saints (2025–present)
- * Offseason or practice squad member only

Awards and highlights
- 3× FCS national champion (2018, 2019, 2021); Second-team All-MVFC (2021)

Career NFL statistics as of Week 5, 2026
- Return yards: 228
- Stats at Pro Football Reference
- Stats at CFL.ca

Jayden Price (born April 5, 2000) is an American professional football cornerback for the New Orleans Saints of the National Football League (NFL). Price played college football for the North Dakota State Bison. He also had a stint with the Atlanta Falcons of the NFL, the Hamilton Tiger-Cats of the Canadian Football League (CFL) and the Arlington Renegades of the UFL.

== College career ==
Price played college football for the North Dakota State Bison from 2018 to 2023. He appeared in 71 games for the Bison, where he recorded 107 tackles, including four tackles for loss, 17 passes defended, three interceptions, three fumble recoveries, one sack and one forced fumble. Price returned 63 punts for 910 yards and five touchdowns. He earned second-team All-MVFC honors as a return specialist.

== Professional career ==
Pre-draft measurables
Height	Weight	Arm length	Hand span	Wingspan	40-yard dash	10-yard split	20-yard split	20-yard shuttle	Three-cone drill	Vertical jump	Broad jump	Bench press
5 ft 11 7/8 in (1.83 m)	185 lb (84 kg)	30 5/8 in (0.78 m)	9 1/4 in (0.23 m)	6 ft 1 3/4 in (1.87 m)	4.45 s	1.55 s	2.56 s	4.07 s	6.93 s	37.5 in (0.95 m)	9 ft 10 in (3.00 m)	13 reps
All values from Pro Day

=== Atlanta Falcons ===
After not being selected in the 2024 NFL draft, Price signed with the Atlanta Falcons as an undrafted free agent. On August 27, 2024, he was released from the team as part of roster cuts.

=== Hamilton Tiger-Cats ===
On September 8, 2024, the Hamilton Tiger-Cats signed Price to their practice roster. He appeared in one game for the Tiger-Cats against the Toronto Argonauts, where he returned a kickoff for 22 yards. On September 25, he reverted to the practice roster before being released on October 8.

=== Birmingham Stallions ===
On October 30, 2024, the Birmingham Stallions signed Price. He was later traded to the Arlington Renegades on November 4.

=== Arlington Renegades ===
Price played in ten games for the Renegades, registering 29 tackles, including two tackles for loss, 13 pass deflections and 0.5 sacks. He also returned 15 kickoffs for 321 yards and 20 punt returns for 194 yards, which placed him second in the UFL in punt return yards in 2025. On June 20, Price was released by the team.

=== New Orleans Saints ===
On June 20, 2025, Price signed with the New Orleans Saints. He was released from the team on August 26 as part of roster cut downs and signed to the practice squad the following day. Price signed a reserve/future contract with New Orleans on January 5, 2026.

On October 13, 2026, Price was waived by the Saints and re-signed to the practice squad three days later.
