= 2021 Southern Illinois Salukis football team =

American college football season

2021 Southern Illinois Salukis football

NCAA Division I Second Round, L 7–38 vs. North Dakota State
- Conference: Missouri Valley Football Conference

Ranking
- STATS: No. 16
- FCS Coaches: No. 17
- Record: 8–5 (5–3 MVFC)
- Head coach: Nick Hill (6th season)
- Offensive coordinator: Blake Rolan (3rd season)
- Defensive coordinator: Jason Petrino (3rd season)
- Home stadium: Saluki Stadium

2021 Missouri Valley Football Conference standings
| | Conf. | | | Overall |
| Team | W | | L | W | | L |
|---|---|---|---|---|---|---|
| No. 1 North Dakota State $^ | 7 | – | 1 | 14 | – | 1 |
| No. 14 Missouri State ^ | 6 | – | 2 | 8 | – | 4 |
| No. 16 Southern Illinois ^ | 5 | – | 3 | 8 | – | 5 |
| No. 18 South Dakota ^ | 5 | – | 3 | 7 | – | 5 |
| No. 4 South Dakota State ^ | 5 | – | 3 | 11 | – | 4 |
| No. 23 Northern Iowa ^ | 4 | – | 4 | 6 | – | 6 |
| Indiana State | 3 | – | 5 | 5 | – | 6 |
| North Dakota | 3 | – | 5 | 5 | – | 6 |
| Western Illinois | 2 | – | 6 | 2 | – | 9 |
| Illinois State | 2 | – | 6 | 4 | – | 7 |
| Youngstown State | 2 | – | 6 | 3 | – | 7 |
$ – Conference champion; ^ – FCS playoff participant; Rankings from STATS Poll

The 2021 Southern Illinois Salukis football team represented Southern Illinois University Carbondale as a member of the Missouri Valley Football Conference (MVFC) during the 2021 NCAA Division I FCS football season. Led by sixth-year head coach Nick Hill, the Salukis compiled an overall record of 8–5 with a mark of 5–3 in conference play, placing in a three-way tie for third in the MVFC. Southern Illinois received an at-large berth in the NCAA Division I Football Championship playoffs, where they beat South Dakota in the first round before losing to the eventual national champion, North Dakota State, in the second round. The team played home games at Saluki Stadium in Carbondale, Illinois.

== Schedule ==
| Date | Time | Opponent | Rank | Site | TV | Result | Attendance |
|---|---|---|---|---|---|---|---|
| September 2 | 6:30 p.m. | at Southeast Missouri State* | No. 7 | Houck Stadium; Cape Girardeau, MO | ESPN+ | W 47–21 | 4,075 |
| September 11 | 6:00 p.m. | at Kansas State* | No. 8 | Bill Snyder Family Football Stadium; Manhattan, KS | ESPN+ | L 23–31 | 47,628 |
| September 18 | 6:00 p.m. | Dayton* | No. 8 | Saluki Stadium; Carbondale, IL | ESPN+ | W 55–3 | 7,338 |
| September 25 | 2:00 pm | Illinois State | No. 7 | Saluki Stadium; Carbondale, IL | ESPN+ | W 35–17 | 8,618 |
| October 2 | 3:00 p.m. | at Western Illinois | No. 7 | Hanson Field; Macomb, IL | ESPN+ | W 31–30 ^{OT} | 4,107 |
| October 9 | 2:00 p.m. | at No. 2 South Dakota State | No. 8 | Dana J. Dykhouse Stadium; Brookings, SD | ESPN+ | W 42–41 ^{OT} | 12,216 |
| October 16 | 2:00 p.m. | No. 22 North Dakota | No. 4 | Saluki Stadium; Carbondale, IL | ESPN3 | W 31–28 | 10,644 |
| October 30 | 4:00 p.m. | at No. 16 Northern Iowa | No. 3 | UNI-Dome; Cedar Falls, IA | ESPN+ | L 16–23 | 5,902 |
| November 6 | 12:00 p.m. | No. 17 Missouri State | No. 7 | Saluki Stadium; Carbondale, IL | ESPN3 | L 28–38 | 7,176 |
| November 13 | 12:00 p.m. | at Indiana State | No. 15 | Memorial Stadium; Terre Haute, IN | ESPN3 | W 47–21 | 3,265 |
| November 20 | 12:00 p.m. | Youngstown State | No. 17 | Saluki Stadium; Carbondale, IL | ESPN+ | L 18–35 | 4,935 |
| November 27 | 5:00 p.m. | at No. 17 South Dakota* | No. 21 | DakotaDome; Vermillion, SD (NCAA Division I First Round) | ESPN+ | W 22–10 | 3,597 |
| December 4 | 2:30 p.m. | at No. 3 North Dakota State* | No. 21 | Fargodome; Fargo, ND (NCAA Division I Second Round) | ESPN+ | L 7–38 | 12,557 |
*Non-conference game; Rankings from STATS Poll released prior to the game; All times are in Central time
