= Curt Mallory =

American football player and coach (born 1969)

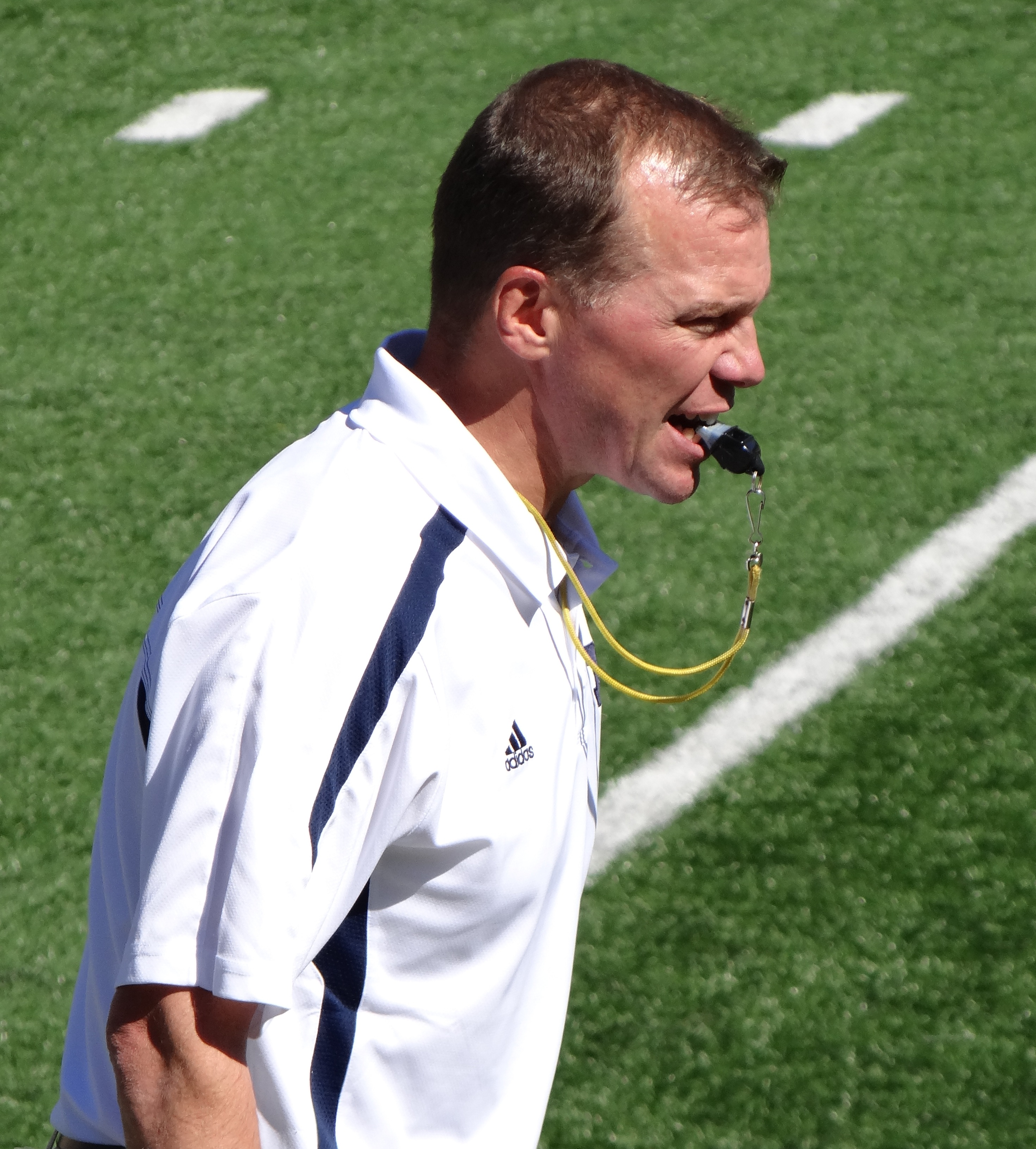
- Mallory at Michigan Stadium, September 2012

Current position
- Title: Head coach
- Team: Indiana State
- Conference: MVFC
- Record: 29–74

Biographical details
- Born: May 9, 1969 (age 57)
- Education: Michigan (1992); Indiana (1999)

Playing career
- 1988–1990: Michigan
- Position: Inside linebacker

Coaching career (HC unless noted)
- 1993–1994: Indiana (GA)
- 1995–1999: Ball State (LB)
- 2000: Ball State (DB)
- 2001: Central Michigan (DB)
- 2002–2004: Indiana (DB)
- 2005–2006: Illinois (DB)
- 2007–2009: Illinois (co-DC)
- 2010: Akron (DC)
- 2011–2014: Michigan (DB)
- 2015–2016: Wyoming (DB)
- 2017–present: Indiana State

Head coaching record
- Overall: 29–74

Accomplishments and honors

Awards
- MVFC Coach of the Year (2018); Phil Steele FCS Coach of The Year (2019)

Curt Mallory (born May 9, 1969) is an American college football coach and former player, currently the head coach at Indiana State. He has been a coach since 1995 and has held defensive coordinator positions at the University of Illinois and the University of Akron. Mallory played college football for the Michigan Wolverines as a linebacker from 1989 to 1990, and coached there from 2011 to 2014.

== Early years ==
Mallory is the youngest son of former Indiana Hoosiers football coach Bill Mallory. He played high school football at Bloomington South High School. He was a starter at linebacker starting with the last game of his freshman year at Bloomington South. Mallory's older brothers, Mike and Doug Mallory played college football at the University of Michigan. In February 1988, and despite having an offer to play for his father at Indiana, Mallory announced that, like his older brothers, he had committed to Michigan.

== Football player ==
Mallory played college football at Michigan under head coach Bo Schembechler in 1989 and under head coach Gary Moeller in 1990. The 1989 team compiled a 10–2 record, won the Big Ten championship, and lost to USC in the 1990 Rose Bowl. The 1990 team was the co-champion of the Big Ten. Mallory's final game for Michigan was the 1991 Gator Bowl, a 35–3 victory over Ole Miss in which Mallory had a key interception. Mallory graduated from Michigan in 1992 with a Bachelor of Science degree in sport management and communications.

== Coaching career ==
Mallory's coaching career began with a stint as a student assistant on Gary Moeller's Michigan football staff in 1992. He next served as a graduate assistant on his father's football coaching staff at Indiana University during the 1993 and 1994 seasons. Mallory received a master's degree in outdoor recreation from Indiana University in 1999.

In March 1995, Bill Lynch, the incoming coach at Ball State, hired Mallory as his linebacker's coach. Lynch had previously served as an assistant coach under Mallory's father at Indiana. From 1996 to 2000, Mallory was an assistant coach at Ball State under Lynch – he coached linebackers from 1996 to 1999 and the secondary in 2000.

In January 2001, Mallory resigned his position at Ball State to become the secondary coach at Central Michigan.

In February 2002, Mallory was hired as the secondary coach at Indiana University under head coach Gerry DiNardo. He remained in that position for three years through the 2004 season. He was the position coach to Herana-Daze Jones at Indiana, and the team's pass defense ranked 33rd nationally in 2002.

In December 2004, incoming head coach Ron Zook announced that he had rehired Mallory as his defensive secondary coach at the University of Illinois. While at Illinois, Mallory was the position coach for Vontae Davis and Thorpe Award finalist Kevin Mitchall. He became the team's co-defensive coordinator in 2007 and was demoted after the 2009 season.

In January 2010, Mallory was hired as the defensive coordinator and cornerbacks coach at the University of Akron.

In February 2011, Mallory was hired as the defensive secondary coach at Michigan. In Mallory's first year in the position, Michigan went from being ranked 112th nationally in pass defense during the 2010 season to being ranked 16th in the nation in 2011. Through the first ten games of the 2012 season, Mallory's second at Michigan, the team ranked first in the nation in pass defense, allowing only 149.2 yards per game (Nebraska ranked second nationally with 164.4 yards allowed per game).

In early 2014, Mallory was publicly acknowledged as a candidate for the head coaching position at Eastern Illinois University, a FCS program in Charleston, Illinois. The job eventually went to Louisiana Tech defensive coordinator Kim Dameron, a former EIU assistant. On January 7, 2015, Mallory joined the staff of Craig Bohl at Wyoming coaching the Cowboys defensive secondary.

=== Indiana State ===
On January 23, 2017, Mallory was named the 26th head coach of Indiana State.

=== 2017 ===
In 2017, his first season as head coach, the Sycamores finished winless at 0–11.

=== 2018 ===
The 2018 season featured the largest turnaround in all of the 2018 division I football season as Mallory led the Sycamores to a 7–4 regular season record, including a 5–3 conference record. Aided by a resurgence in the run-game, a solidified defense, and the emergence of Iowa transfer Ryan Boyle, Indiana State finished with a top 25 ranking by the end of the regular season. After beating Western Illinois (a team the Sycamores lost to 55–0 in 2017) 15–13 in the season finale, Mallory and Indiana State finished with their best record since the 2014 playoff run. However, the Sycamores were left out of the 2018 FCS playoffs, but finished in 3rd place in the MVFC standings.

=== 2019 ===
Mallory, in his 3rd season as Indiana State's head coach, led the sycamores’ to a 5–7 season (3–5 in MVC play).

== Personal ==
In addition to his father Bill, Mallory's older brothers are also involved in coaching. Older brother Doug Mallory coaches defensive backs for the Baltimore Ravens in the NFL. Curt's eldest brother, Mike Mallory, also coached in the NFL, and now currently serves as a special teams analyst with the Michigan Wolverines. He has an older sister, Barb.

He and his wife, Lori, have three children: James, Sammy, and Margo.

Curt's nephew Will Mallory is currently a TE for the Indianapolis Colts.

== Head coaching record ==
Year	Team	Overall	Conference	Standing	Bowl/playoffs	TSN/STATS^{#}	Coaches^{°}
Indiana State Sycamores (Missouri Valley Football Conference) (2017–present)
2017	Indiana State	0–11	0–8	10th			
2018	Indiana State	7–4	5–3	T–3rd		22	25
2019	Indiana State	5–7	3–5	T–7th			
2020–21	No team—COVID-19						
2021	Indiana State	5–6	3–5	T–7th			
2022	Indiana State	2–9	1–7	10th			
2023	Indiana State	1–10	1–7	T–10th			
2024	Indiana State	4–8	3–5	T–6th			
2025	Indiana State	3–9	1–7	T-8th			
2026	Indiana State	2–10	0–8	9th			
Indiana State:		29–74	17–55				
Total:		29–74					
