= Don Gardner (American football) =

American football player (born 1997)

No. 36
- Position: Cornerback

Personal information
- Born: December 9, 1997 (age 28); Chicago, Illinois, U.S.
- Listed height: 6 ft 1 in (1.85 m)
- Listed weight: 180 lb (82 kg)

Career information
- High school: Wendell Phillips Academy (Chicago)
- College: South Dakota State
- NFL draft: 2022: undrafted

Career history
- Tampa Bay Buccaneers (2022–2023)

Career NFL statistics
- Games played: 1
- Stats at Pro Football Reference

Don Gardner (born December 9, 1997) is an American former professional football player who was a cornerback in the National Football League (NFL). He played college football for the South Dakota State Jackrabbits.

== Professional career ==
Pre-draft measurables
Height	Weight	Arm length	Hand span	40-yard dash	10-yard split	20-yard split	20-yard shuttle	Three-cone drill	Vertical jump	Broad jump	Bench press
6 ft 0 1/2 in (1.84 m)	189 lb (86 kg)	31 1/8 in (0.79 m)	9 in (0.23 m)	4.48 s	1.55 s	2.61 s	4.25 s	6.93 s	36.5 in (0.93 m)	10 ft 7 in (3.23 m)	11 reps
All values from Pro Day

Gardner signed with the Tampa Bay Buccaneers on April 30 after the 2022 NFL draft as an undrafted free agent. On August 30, Gardner was waived by the Buccaneers but signed to the practice squad the next day. He was elevated from the practice squad on October 27 ahead of the Thursday night game against the Baltimore Ravens, that same day he made his NFL debut playing 14 snaps. He signed a reserve/future contract on January 17, 2023. He was waived on August 28, 2023. On November 8, Gardner was signed to the Buccaneers' practice squad. He was released on November 22.
