= Trevor Penning =

American football player (born 1999)

- Penning in 2023

No. 75 – Los Angeles Chargers
- Position: Offensive tackle
- Roster status: Injured reserve

Personal information
- Born: May 15, 1999 (age 27); Clear Lake, Iowa, U.S.
- Listed height: 6 ft 7 in (2.01 m)
- Listed weight: 325 lb (147 kg)

Career information
- High school: Newman Catholic (Mason City, Iowa)
- College: Northern Iowa (2017–2021)
- NFL draft: 2022: 1st round, 19th overall pick

Career history
- New Orleans Saints (2022–2025); Los Angeles Chargers (2025–present)

Awards and highlights
- First-team All-MVFC (2021)

Career NFL statistics as of Week 4, 2026
- Games played: 56
- Games started: 35
- Stats at Pro Football Reference

Trevor Penning (born May 15, 1999) is an American professional football offensive tackle for the Los Angeles Chargers of the National Football League (NFL). He played college football for the Northern Iowa Panthers and was selected by the New Orleans Saints in the first round of the 2022 NFL draft.

== Early life ==
Penning was born on May 15, 1999, in Clear Lake, Iowa. He attended Newman Catholic High School in Mason City, Iowa, where he played football, basketball, and threw discus and shot put on the track and field team. Penning committed to play college football at Northern Iowa shortly after receiving an offer from the team. Penning grew up as a Minnesota Vikings fan.

== College career ==
Penning redshirted his true freshman season at the University of Northern Iowa. As a redshirt sophomore, Penning started all 15 of UNI's games. He started five games at left tackle and one at right tackle during his redshirt junior season, which was played in the spring of 2021 due to the COVID-19 pandemic in the United States. Penning entered the 2021 fall season as one of the highest-rated offensive tackle and FCS prospects for the 2022 NFL draft. Penning's younger brother, Jared, has been the starter next to him on the Panthers' offensive line since his redshirt sophomore season.

== Professional career ==
Pre-draft measurables
Height	Weight	Arm length	Hand span	Wingspan	40-yard dash	10-yard split	20-yard split	20-yard shuttle	Three-cone drill	Vertical jump	Broad jump	Bench press
6 ft 7 1/8 in (2.01 m)	325 lb (147 kg)	34 1/4 in (0.87 m)	10 1/8 in (0.26 m)	6 ft 10 7/8 in (2.11 m)	4.89 s	1.70 s	2.82 s	4.62 s	7.25 s	28.0 in (0.71 m)	9 ft 3 in (2.82 m)	28 reps
All values from NFL Combine/Pro Day

=== New Orleans Saints ===
Penning was selected in the first round with the 19th overall pick by the New Orleans Saints in the 2022 NFL draft. He was placed on injured reserve with a torn ligament in his foot on September 1, 2022. He was activated on November 26. In Week 18 against the Carolina Panthers, Penning suffered a Lisfranc fracture. He appeared in six games as a rookie during the regular season.

=== Los Angeles Chargers ===
On November 4, 2025, Penning was traded to the Los Angeles Chargers in exchange for a 2027 sixth-round pick.

On March 10, 2026, Penning re-signed with the Chargers on a one-year, $4.5 million contract.

== Personal life ==
His brother, Jared, signed with the Baltimore Ravens as an undrafted free agent in 2025.

== NFL career statistics ==
Legend
	No type penalty
**Bold**	Career high

=== Regular season ===
Year	Team	Games		Offense					
Year	Team	GP	GS	Snaps	Pct	Holding	False Start	Decl/Pen	Acpt/Pen
2022	NO	6	1	124	35%	0	1	0	1
2023	NO	**17**	5	417	36%	3	**2**	1	5
2024	NO	**17**	**17**	**1,082**	99%	**5**	1	**2**	**11**
2025	NO	6	6	358	**100%**	3	2	0	5
2025	LAC	7	4	193	43%	2	1	0	3
2026	LAC	2	1	98	72%	0	0	0	0
Career		55	34	2,272	–	13	7	3	25
