= Sitting Bull Trophy =

American college football rivalry

- North Dakota Fighting Hawks South Dakota Coyotes
- Sport: Football
- First meeting: November 7, 1903; North Dakota 6, South Dakota 0
- Latest meeting: October 24, 2026; South Dakota 26, North Dakota 23 (OT)
- Next meeting: 2027
- Trophy: None (formerly the Sitting Bull Trophy)

Statistics
- Total meetings: 104
- All-time series: North Dakota leads, 64–35–5
- Largest victory: North Dakota, 55–0 (1963)
- Longest win streak: North Dakota, 12 (1928–1941)
- Current win streak: South Dakota, 4 (2023–present)

Locations of North Dakota and South Dakota

The Sitting Bull Trophy is the name of the rivalry trophy that was awarded to the winner of the annual football game between the University of North Dakota Fighting Hawks (formerly the North Dakota Fighting Sioux) and the University of South Dakota Coyotes. The rivalry stems from the time the two teams spent competing together in the North Central Conference (1922–2007) and later in the Great West Conference (2008–2011).

== The Trophy ==
The oak bust, displaying a picture of Sitting Bull, designed in 1953 after a suggestion by newspaperman Al Neuharth. The inspiration for the trophy was a minor 1953 dispute over which state was home to the final resting place of the famed chief, after it revealed that Sitting Bull's family members had exhumed and reinterred what they believed to be his remains, moving them from Fort Yates, North Dakota to Mobridge, South Dakota. In 2000, the Sitting Bull Trophy retired, amid the ongoing NCAA controversy over the use of Native American names and symbols by its member institutions.

== Future ==
Previously, the two teams were not currently competing in the same conference, with North Dakota joining the Big Sky Conference and South Dakota joining the Missouri Valley Football Conference following the demise of Great West Conference football in 2011. 2012 marked the first year the two teams did not play each other since the 1940s, when World War II interrupted the rivalry; however, they both played each other in 2016 and 2017 in non-conference play. The two teams have met 104 times on the football field, with North Dakota currently holding a 64–35–5 edge in the all-time series. North Dakota joined the Missouri Valley Football Conference in 2020, renewing the annual rivalry.

== Game results ==
North Dakota victories	South Dakota victories	Tie games

No.	Date	Location	Winner	Score
1	November 7, 1903	Grand Forks, ND	North Dakota	6–0
2	November 11, 1908	Vermillion, SD	South Dakota	10–4
3	November 10, 1912	Sioux Falls, SD	South Dakota	44–0
4	October 31, 1914	Grand Forks, ND	South Dakota	30–3
5	November 13, 1915	Sioux Falls, SD	Tie	0–0
6	October 28, 1916	Grand Forks, ND	North Dakota	20–0
7	October 13, 1917	Vermillion, SD	South Dakota	19–0
8	October 18, 1919	Grand Forks, ND	North Dakota	13–0
9	November 6, 1920	Vermillion, SD	Tie	7–7
10	October 22, 1921	Grand Forks, ND	North Dakota	21–0
11	October 14, 1922	Vermillion, SD	North Dakota	7–0
12	October 13, 1923	Grand Forks, ND	South Dakota	13–6
13	October 11, 1924	Vermillion, SD	South Dakota	6–0
14	October 17, 1925	Grand Forks, ND	North Dakota	3–0
15	October 16, 1926	Vermillion, SD	South Dakota	12–0
16	October 15, 1927	Grand Forks, ND	South Dakota	6–0
17	November 10, 1928	Vermillion, SD	North Dakota	6–0
18	October 11, 1929	Grand Forks, ND	North Dakota	13–7
19	November 15, 1930	Vermillion, SD	North Dakota	21–0
20	October 10, 1931	Aberdeen, SD	North Dakota	52–6
21	September 30, 1932	Grand Forks, ND	North Dakota	18–8
22	October 13, 1933	Grand Forks, ND	North Dakota	41–0
23	October 6, 1934	Vermillion, SD	North Dakota	21–0
24	October 11, 1935	Grand Forks, ND	North Dakota	25–0
25	November 13, 1936	Vermillion, SD	North Dakota	6–0
26	October 1, 1937	Grand Forks, ND	North Dakota	13–7
27	November 9, 1940	Vermillion, SD	North Dakota	13–0
28	October 11, 1941	Grand Forks, ND	North Dakota	14–7
29	November 13, 1942	Vermillion, SD	South Dakota	26–0
30	October 5, 1946	Grand Forks, ND	North Dakota	21–6
31	November 1, 1947	Vermillion, SD	South Dakota	20–7
32	October 16, 1948	Grand Forks, ND	North Dakota	13–7
33	October 1, 1949	Vermillion, SD	Tie	7–7
34	October 14, 1950	Grand Forks, ND	North Dakota	28–7
35	November 10, 1951	Vermillion, SD	South Dakota	35–13
36	October 4, 1952	Grand Forks, ND	South Dakota	21–14
37	November 14, 1953	Vermillion, SD	North Dakota	18–14
38	October 9, 1954	Grand Forks, ND	North Dakota	27–21
39	November 12, 1955	Vermillion, SD	North Dakota	18–14
40	October 6, 1956	Grand Forks, ND	South Dakota	32–14
41	October 5, 1957	Vermillion, SD	Tie	27–27
42	October 4, 1958	Grand Forks, ND	North Dakota	28–14
43	October 3, 1959	Vermillion, SD	South Dakota	31–14
44	October 1, 1960	Grand Forks, ND	North Dakota	27–7
45	October 7, 1961	Vermillion, SD	North Dakota	21–7
46	November 10, 1962	Grand Forks, ND	North Dakota	31–0
47	November 9, 1963	Grand Forks, ND	North Dakota	55–0
48	October 24, 1964	Grand Forks, ND	North Dakota	21–14
49	October 23, 1965	Vermillion, SD	North Dakota	33–7
50	October 8, 1966	Grand Forks, ND	North Dakota	31–17
51	October 7, 1967	Vermillion, SD	North Dakota	9–6
52	September 28, 1968	Grand Forks, ND	South Dakota	17–16
53	September 27, 1969	Vermillion, SD	North Dakota	35–26

No.	Date	Location	Winner	Score
54	September 19, 1970	Grand Forks, ND	Tie	14–14
55	November 6, 1971	Vermillion, SD	South Dakota	29–21
56	September 23, 1972	Grand Forks, ND	North Dakota	33–3
57	November 3, 1973	Vermillion, SD	North Dakota	54–21
58	October 26, 1974	Grand Forks, ND	South Dakota	27–24
59	October 25, 1975	Vermillion, SD	North Dakota	27–17
60	October 9, 1976	Grand Forks, ND	South Dakota	14–7
61	October 8, 1977	Vermillion, SD	North Dakota	20–0
62	October 28, 1978	Vermillion, SD	South Dakota	24–7
63	October 20, 1979	Grand Forks, ND	North Dakota	23–22
64	October 11, 1980	Vermillion, SD	South Dakota	32–24
65	October 3, 1981	Grand Forks, ND	North Dakota	27–0
66	September 25, 1982	Vermillion, SD	South Dakota	10–9
67	November 5, 1983	Vermillion, SD	South Dakota	26–16
68	November 3, 1984	Grand Forks, ND	South Dakota	16–14
69	September 21, 1985	Grand Forks, ND	South Dakota	45–3
70	September 20, 1986	Vermillion, SD	South Dakota	28–12
71	November 7, 1987	Grand Forks, ND	North Dakota	30–29
72	November 5, 1988	Vermillion, SD	North Dakota	24–9
73	September 23, 1989	Vermillion, SD	South Dakota	17–14
74	September 22, 1990	Grand Forks, ND	North Dakota	46–12
75	September 28, 1991	Vermillion, SD	North Dakota	21–6
76	September 26, 1992	Grand Forks, ND	North Dakota	52–3
77	November 6, 1993	Grand Forks, ND	North Dakota	42–7
78	November 5, 1994	Vermillion, SD	North Dakota	23–20
79	October 21, 1995	Vermillion, SD	South Dakota	35–0
80	October 26, 1996	Grand Forks, ND	North Dakota	29–6
81	November 1, 1997	Vermillion, SD	North Dakota	20–19
82	October 31, 1998	Grand Forks, ND	North Dakota	33–14
83	September 18, 1999	Vermillion, SD	North Dakota	17–10
84	September 16, 2000	Grand Forks, ND	North Dakota	42–14
85	November 10, 2001	Vermillion, SD	North Dakota	48–7
86	November 16, 2002	Grand Forks, ND	North Dakota	20–0
87	November 8, 2003	Vermillion, SD	North Dakota	37–3
88	November 6, 2004	Grand Forks, ND	North Dakota	41–21
89	November 5, 2005	Vermillion, SD	South Dakota	42–30
90	November 11, 2006	Grand Forks, ND	North Dakota	33–26
91	November 10, 2007	Vermillion, SD	North Dakota	31–27
92	November 22, 2008	Vermillion, SD	North Dakota	34–31
93	October 3, 2009	Grand Forks, ND	North Dakota	27–12
94	October 2, 2010	Vermillion, SD	South Dakota	27–17
95	November 19, 2011	Grand Forks, ND	North Dakota	38–37
96	September 17, 2016	Grand Forks, ND	North Dakota	47–44
97	September 16, 2017	Vermillion, SD	#23 South Dakota	45–7
98	March 4, 2021 (Note: Played in the 2020–21 school year. Due to COVID-19, the MVFC moved its conference season from fall 2020 to spring 2021.)	Grand Forks, ND	#4 North Dakota	21–10
99	October 9, 2021	Vermillion, SD	South Dakota	20–13
100	November 12, 2022	Grand Forks, ND	#19 North Dakota	28–19
101	November 11, 2023	Vermillion, SD	#6 South Dakota	14–10
102	November 16, 2024	Grand Forks, ND	#5 South Dakota	42–36
103	November 1, 2025	Vermillion, SD	South Dakota	26–21
104	October 24, 2026	Vermillion, SD	#8 South Dakota	26–23^{OT}
Series: North Dakota leads 64–35–5

== See also ==
- List of NCAA college football rivalry games
- List of most-played college football series in NCAA Division I
