= 2021 James Madison Dukes football team =

American college football season

2021 James Madison Dukes football

CAA co-champion Lambert Cup winner

NCAA Division I Semifinal, L 14–20 vs. North Dakota State
- Conference: Colonial Athletic Association

Ranking
- STATS: No. 3
- FCS Coaches: No. 3
- Record: 12–2 (7–1 CAA)
- Head coach: Curt Cignetti (3rd season)
- Offensive coordinator: Mike Shanahan (1st season)
- Offensive scheme: Spread
- Defensive coordinator: Corey Hetherman (3rd season)
- Base defense: 4–3
- Home stadium: Bridgeforth Stadium

2021 Colonial Athletic Association football standings
	Conf.			Overall
Team	W		L	W		L
No. 3 James Madison +^	7	–	1	12	–	2
No. 8 Villanova +^	7	–	1	10	–	3
Elon	5	–	3	6	–	5
Rhode Island	4	–	4	7	–	4
Maine	4	–	4	6	–	5
Richmond	4	–	4	6	–	5
William & Mary	4	–	4	6	–	5
Stony Brook	4	–	4	5	–	6
Delaware	3	–	5	5	–	6
Towson	3	–	5	4	–	7
New Hampshire	2	–	6	3	–	8
Albany	1	–	7	2	–	9
+ – Conference co-champions; ^ – FCS playoff participant; Rankings from STATS Poll

The 2021 James Madison Dukes football team represented James Madison University as a member of the Colonial Athletic Association (CAA) during the 2021 NCAA Division I FCS football season. They were led by third-year head coach Curt Cignetti and played their home games at Bridgeforth Stadium.

On November 6, 2021, James Madison announced that this will be the last season for the team in the CAA and join the Sun Belt Conference (FBS) on July 1, 2022.

== Schedule ==
Date	Time	Opponent	Rank	Site	TV	Result	Attendance
September 4	6:00 p.m.	Morehead State*	No. 2	Bridgeforth Stadium; Harrisonburg, VA	NBCSW	W 68–10	22,229
September 11	4:00 p.m.	Maine	No. 3	Bridgeforth Stadium; Harrisonburg, VA	NBCSW+	W 55–7	22,108
September 18	8:00 p.m.	at No. 9 Weber State*	No. 3	Stewart Stadium; Ogden, UT	ESPN+	W 37–24	11,222
October 2	3:30 p.m.	at No. 25 New Hampshire	No. 3	Wildcat Stadium; Durham, NH	FloSports	W 23–21	17,323
October 9	2:00 p.m.	No. 11 Villanova	No. 3	Bridgeforth Stadium; Harrisonburg, VA	FloSports	L 27–28	25,035
October 16	2:00 p.m.	at Richmond	No. 8	E. Claiborne Robins Stadium; Richmond, VA (rivalry)		W 19–3	7,809
October 23	3:00 p.m.	at No. 23 Delaware	No. 7	Delaware Stadium; Newark, DE (rivalry)	NBCSP/FloSports	W 22–10	15,783
October 30	2:00 p.m.	Elon	No. 5	Bridgeforth Stadium; Harrisonburg, VA		W 45–21	21,029
November 6	3:30 p.m.	Campbell*^{†}	No. 3	Bridgeforth Stadium; Harrisonburg, VA		W 51–14	23,571
November 13	3:30 p.m.	at No. 25 William & Mary	No. 2	Zable Stadium; Williamsburg, VA (rivalry)		W 32–22	10,555
November 20	2:00 p.m.	Towson	No. 2	Bridgeforth Stadium; Harrisonburg, VA		W 56–10	16,644
December 4	2:00 p.m.	No. 18 Southeastern Louisiana*	No. 3	Bridgeforth Stadium; Harrisonburg, VA (NCAA Division I Second Round)	ESPN+	W 59–20	11,743
December 10	7:00 p.m.	No. 5 Montana*	No. 3	Bridgeforth Stadium; Harrisonburg, VA (NCAA Division I Quarterfinal)	ESPN2	W 28–6	14,690
December 17	9:15 p.m.	at No. 2 North Dakota State*	No. 3	Fargodome; Fargo, ND (NCAA Division I Semifinal)	ESPN2	L 14–20	16,550
*Non-conference game; ^{†}Homecoming; Rankings from STATS Poll released prior to the game; All times are in Eastern time

== Roster ==
2021 James Madison Dukes football team roster
Players
Coaches
Offense

Pos.	#	Name	Class
WR	1	Scott Bracey	RSr
RB	2	Austin Douglas	RFr
RB	3	Solomon Vanhorse	RSo
RB	5	Latrele Palmer	RSo
RB	6	Kaelon Black	RFr
WR	7	Antwane Wells Jr.	RFr
WR	8	Kris Thornton	RJr
WR	9	Reggie Brown	RSo
QB	10	Kyle Adams	RFr
QB	11	Billy Atkins	Fr
QB	12	Cole Johnson	RSr
WR	13	Jamir Hudson	RJr
QB	14	Patrick Bentley	RJr
WR	15	Maxwell James	Fr
WR	16	Desmond Green	Fr
QB	16	Clay Vance	Fr
WR	17	Kyndel Dean	RJr
WR	19	Devin Ravenel	RJr
WR	22	Marion Haley	Fr
RB	26	Lorenzo Bryant Jr.	RSr
WR	28	Blake Barnes	RFr
RB	31	Percy Agyei-Obese	RSr
RB	32	Kalin Jean	Fr
TE	37	Clayton Cheatham	RSr
WR	39	Alex Miller	RJr
RB	40	Peyton Rutherford	RFr
RB	41	Anthony Eaton	RFr
TE	42	Matt Binkowski	Fr
TE	44	Zach Horton	Fr
WR	45	Holt Egan	RFr
OL	52	Tyshawn Wyatt	RFr
OL	55	Ronald Altman	RFr
OL	56	Nick Kidwell	RSo
OL	58	Tanner Morris	RFr
OL	61	Joe Worman	RFr
OL	62	Kyle Smith	RSo
OL	63	J.T. Timming	RSr
OL	66	Cole Potts	RFr
OL	70	Brett Davis	Fr
OL	71	Scott Hummel	Fr
OL	72	Josh Toner	Fr
OL	74	Tyler Stephens	RFr
OL	75	Jaelin Montgomery	Fr
OL	77	Liam Fornadel	RSr
WR	82	Kevin Curry Jr.	RFr
WR	83	Josh Sims	RJr
TE	84	Kelly Mitchell	RFr
TE	85	Noah Turner	RSr
TE	86	Hunter Bullock	RFr
WR	88	Dominic Wilson	Fr
TE	89	Drew Painter	RJr

Defense

Pos.	#	Name	Class
DL	0	Isaac Ukwu	RJr
S	1	Que Reid	RSo
LB	2	Diamonte Tucker-Dorsey	RJr
DL	3	Mike Greene	RSr
CB	5	Wesley McCormick	RSr
LB	6	Julio Ayamel	RFr
LB	7	Kelvin Azanama	RSr
S	8	Wayne Davis	RSr
CB	9	Greg Ross	RSr
DL	10	Jalen Green	RSo
CB	11	Antonio Webb	RFr
S	12	Josh Sarratt	RSo
CB	13	John Ransom	RFr
CB	14	Jamari Currence	RSo
DL	15	Bryce Carter	RSr
CB	17	Chase Lundy	RFr
LB	18	Skylar Martin	Fr
S	19	Jalen Phelps	RSr
CB	20	Xavier Cokley	RFr
CB	21	Jordan Swann	RJr
S	22	Jordan White	RFr
CB	23	Sammy Malignaggi	RFr
S	24	Jebril Murray	RFr
LB	25	Jailin Walker	Fr
CB	26	Jack Sroba	RJr
CB	27	Taurus Carroll	RSr
S	28	Kye Holmes	Fr
S	30	Messiah Russell	Fr
S	32	MJ Hampton	RSr
S	33	Sam Kidd	RJr
S	34	Chris Chukwuneke	RSo
S	35	Jahquil Batts	Fr
LB	37	Logan Ortt	Fr
DL	38	Mikail Kamara	RFr
DL	39	Payne Bauer	RFr
LB	41	Tate Beaver	RJr
LB	44	Taurus Jones	RFr
DL	45	Antonio Colclough	RSo
LB	46	Seth Naotala	RFr
DL	47	Mike Wilcox	RSo
S	49	Francis Meehan	RSo
LB	51	Mateo Jackson	RJr
DL	53	Zai Roberts	RFr
LB	54	Brandon Fique	Fr
DL	55	Jordan Funk	RFr
DL	56	Matei Fitz	Fr
DL	57	Zaid Hamdan	RSo
DL	58	Lance Blankenship	Fr
DL	90	Tony Thurston	RSo
DL	92	Tyler Negron	RFr
DL	94	Sean Johns	RFr
DL	97	Abi Nwabuoku-Okonji	RSo
DL	99	James Carpenter	RFr

Special teams

Pos.	#	Name	Class
K	36	Justin Ritter	RFr
K	40	Camden Wise	RSo
LS	46	Aaron Whear	RFr
LS	50	Kyle Davis	RJr
LS	51	Kaden Schickel	Fr
K	91	Ethan Ratke	RSr
K	96	Connor Madden	RSo
P	98	Harry O'Kelly	RSr

Head coach

- Curt Cignetti

Coordinators/assistant coaches

- Corey Hetherman – Defensive Coordinator/Associate Head Coach/Defensive Line
- Marcus Hall-Oliver – Defensive Backs - Safeties
- Matt Birkett – Defensive Backs - Cornerbacks
- Eddie Whitley Jr. – Defensive Backs - Rovers
- Bryant Haines – Linebackers/Co-Defensive Coordinator
- John Miller – Running Backs
- Mike Shanahan – Offensive Coordinator/Wide Receivers/Recruiting Coordinator
- Damian Wroblewski – Offensive Line/Associate Head Coach for Offense
- Grant Cain – Special Teams Coordinator/Tight Ends
- Tino Sunseri – Quarterbacks
- Derek Owings – Director of Strength & Conditioning
- James Ferguson – Director of Football Operations/Pro Scout Liaison
- Luke Wisner – Offensive Graduate Assistant
- Alex Higgins – Defensive Graduate Assistant
- Ben Harakel – Defensive Analyst

Legend

- (C) Team captain
- (S) Suspended
- (I) Ineligible
- Injured
- Redshirt

Roster
