= 2021 North Dakota State Bison football team =

American college football season

2021 North Dakota State Bison football

NCAA Division I champion MVFC champion

NCAA Division I Championship Game, W 38–10 vs. Montana State
- Conference: Missouri Valley Football Conference

Ranking
- STATS: No. 1
- FCS Coaches: No. 1
- Record: 14–1 (7–1 MVFC)
- Head coach: Matt Entz (3rd season)
- Offensive coordinator: Tyler Roehl (3rd season)
- Offensive scheme: Pro-style
- Defensive coordinator: David Braun (3rd season)
- Base defense: Multiple 4–3
- Home stadium: Fargodome

2021 Missouri Valley Football Conference standings
	Conf.			Overall
Team	W		L	W		L
No. 1 North Dakota State $^	7	–	1	14	–	1
No. 14 Missouri State ^	6	–	2	8	–	4
No. 16 Southern Illinois ^	5	–	3	8	–	5
No. 18 South Dakota ^	5	–	3	7	–	5
No. 4 South Dakota State ^	5	–	3	11	–	4
No. 23 Northern Iowa ^	4	–	4	6	–	6
Indiana State	3	–	5	5	–	6
North Dakota	3	–	5	5	–	6
Western Illinois	2	–	6	2	–	9
Illinois State	2	–	6	4	–	7
Youngstown State	2	–	6	3	–	7
$ – Conference champion; ^ – FCS playoff participant; Rankings from STATS Poll

The 2021 North Dakota State Bison football team represented the North Dakota State University in the 2021 NCAA Division I FCS football season. The Bison competed as members of the Missouri Valley Football Conference and were led by third-year head coach Matt Entz. They played their home games at Fargodome in Fargo, North Dakota.

The Bison finished their regular season with a 10–1 record (7–1 in conference), losing only to South Dakota State. They were seeded second in the FCS postseason tournament and received a first-round bye; they then defeated Southern Illinois, East Tennessee State, and James Madison to reach the championship game. The Bison completed their season by defeating Montana State on January 8 in Frisco, Texas, to capture the program's ninth FCS title in 11 seasons.

== Schedule ==
Date	Time	Opponent	Rank	Site	TV	Result	Attendance
September 4	2:30 p.m.	Albany*	No. 4	Fargodome; Fargo, ND	ABC ND/ESPN+	W 28–6	15,156
September 11	2:30 p.m.	Valparaiso*	No. 5	Fargodome; Fargo, ND	ABC ND/ESPN+	W 64–0	15,118
September 18	5:00 p.m.	at Towson*	No. 5	Johnny Unitas Stadium; Towson, MD	FloSports	W 35–7	9,109
October 2	2:00 p.m.	at No. 10 North Dakota	No. 5	Alerus Center; Grand Forks, ND (Nickel Trophy)	ABC ND/ESPN+/Midco	W 16–10	12,846
October 9	1:00 p.m.	No. 16 Northern Iowa	No. 5	Fargodome; Fargo, ND	ABC ND/ESPN+	W 34–20	18,536
October 16	2:00 p.m.	at Illinois State	No. 3	Hancock Stadium; Normal, IL	ABC ND/ESPN+	W 20–0	12,416
October 23	2:30 p.m.	No. 17 Missouri State	No. 3	Fargodome; Fargo, ND	ABC ND/ESPN+	W 27–20	15,559
October 30	2:30 p.m.	Indiana State	No. 2	Fargodome; Fargo, ND	ABC ND/ESPN+	W 44–2	14,383
November 6	2:00 p.m.	at No. 9 South Dakota State	No. 2	Dana J. Dykhouse Stadium; Brookings, SD (Dakota Marker)	ABC ND/ESPN+/Midco	L 19–27	18,122
November 13	11:00 a.m.	at Youngstown State	No. 5	Stambaugh Stadium; Youngstown, OH	ESPN+	W 49–17	8,307
November 20	2:30 p.m.	No. 16 South Dakota	No. 4	Fargodome; Fargo, ND	ABC ND/ESPN+/Midco	W 52–24	16,252
December 4	2:30 p.m.	No. 21 Southern Illinois*	No. 3	Fargodome; Fargo, ND (NCAA Division I Second Round)	ESPN+	W 38–7	12,557
December 11	11:00 a.m.	No. 7 East Tennessee State*	No. 3	Fargodome; Fargo, ND (NCAA Division I Quarterfinal)	ESPN	W 27–3	11,794
December 17	8:15 p.m.	No. 2 James Madison*	No. 3	Fargodome; Fargo, ND (NCAA Division I Semifinal)	ESPN2	W 20–14	16,550
January 8, 2022	11:00 a.m.	vs. No. 7 Montana State	No. 3	Toyota Stadium; Frisco, TX (NCAA Division I Championship Game)	ESPN2	W 38–10	18,942
*Non-conference game; Rankings from STATS Poll released prior to the game; All times are in Central time

== Game summaries ==
=== Regular season ===
==== Albany ====
Albany Great Danes (0-0) vs. North Dakota State Bison (0-0)

Quarter	1	2	3	4	Total
Great Danes	0	6	0	0	6
No. 4 Bison	7	7	7	7	28

at Fargodome, Fargo, ND

- Date: September 4, 2021
- Game time: 2:30 p.m. (CT)
- Game weather: Indoors; 70 °F (21 °C)
- Game attendance: 15,156
- TV: ESPN+

Statistics	Albany	North Dakota State
First downs	8	20
Plays–yards	47-205	62-387
Rushes–yards	19-22	43-259
Passing yards	183	128
Passing: comp–att–int	16-28-2	14-19-0
Time of possession	23:29	36:31

Team	Category	Player	Statistics
Albany	Passing	Jeff Undercuffer	16/28, 183 yds, TD, 2 INT
Albany	Rushing	Karl Mofor	11 car, 21 yds
Albany	Receiving	Roy Alexander	4 rec, 113 yds, TD
North Dakota State	Passing	Quincy Patterson	12/16, 115 yds, TD
North Dakota State	Rushing	Dominic Gonnella	13 car, 135 yds, 2 TD
North Dakota State	Receiving	Christian Watson	4 rec, 37 yds

Scoring summary

Quarter	Time	Drive			Team	Scoring information	Score	
Quarter	Time	Plays	Yards	TOP	Team	Scoring information	ALB	NDSU
1st	1:41	8	80	3:59	NDSU	Dominic Gonnella (#29) 3-yard touchdown run, Jake Reinholz (#37) kick good	0	7
2nd	0:20	5	39	1:45	NDSU	Josh Babicz (#81) 18-yard touchdown reception from Quincy Patterson (#2), Jake Reinholz (#37) kick good	0	14
2nd	0:04	1	67	0:11	ALB	Roy Alexander (#11) 67-yard touchdown reception from Jeff Undercuffer (#13), 2-point pass incomplete	6	14
3rd	14:47	1	75	0:13	NDSU	Dominic Gonnella (#29) 75-yard touchdown run, Jake Reinholz (#37) kick good	6	21
4th	7:10	5	28	2:09	NDSU	Hunter Luepke (#44) 7-yard touchdown run, Jake Reinholz (#37) kick good	6	28
"TOP" = time of possession. For other American football terms, see Glossary of American football.							6	28

==== Valparaiso ====
Valparaiso Beacons (0-1) vs. North Dakota State Bison (1-0)

Quarter	1	2	3	4	Total
Beacons	0	0	0	0	0
No. 5 Bison	22	21	14	7	64

at Fargodome, Fargo, ND

- Date: September 11, 2021
- Game time: 2:30 p.m. (CT)
- Game weather: Indoors; 70 °F (21 °C)
- Game attendance: 15,118
- TV: ESPN+

Statistics	Valparaiso	North Dakota State
First downs	15	22
Plays–yards	64-185	49-583
Rushes–yards	41-73	43-458
Passing yards	112	125
Passing: comp–att–int	14-23-1	5-6-0
Time of possession	35:03	24:57

Team	Category	Player	Statistics
Valparaiso	Passing	Ben Nimz	9/14, 63 yds
Valparaiso	Rushing	Ben Nimz	5 car, 20 yds
Valparaiso	Receiving	Jordan Bingham	4 rec, 34 yds
North Dakota State	Passing	Quincy Patterson	4/5, 102 yds, TD
North Dakota State	Rushing	Quincy Patterson	4 car, 94 yds, TD
North Dakota State	Receiving	Christian Watson	2 rec, 83 yds, TD

Scoring summary

Quarter	Time	Drive			Team	Scoring information	Score	
Quarter	Time	Plays	Yards	TOP	Team	Scoring information	VALPO	NDSU
1st	13:14				NDSU	Punt returned 45 yards for touchdown by Jayden Price (#23), 2-point rush good	0	8
1st	5:22	9	92	3:45	NDSU	Braylon Henderson (#12) 28-yard touchdown run, Jake Reinholz (#37) kick good	0	15
1st	0:10	4	67	2:15	NDSU	Hunter Luepke (#44) 20-yard touchdown run, Jake Reinholz (#37) kick good	0	22
2nd	12:32	1	65	0:10	NDSU	Christian Watson (#1) 65-yard touchdown reception from Quincy Patterson (#2), Jake Reinholz (#37) kick good	0	29
2nd	7:03	3	80	1:06	NDSU	Jalen Bussey (#21) 72-yard touchdown run, Jake Reinholz (#37) kick good	0	36
2nd	0:24	6	83	1:28	NDSU	Quincy Patterson (#2) 52-yard touchdown run, Jake Reinholz (#37) kick good	0	43
3rd	10:58	1	9	0:04	NDSU	TaMerik Williams (#22) 9-yard touchdown run, Will Cardinal (#38) kick good	0	50
3rd	1:57	10	91	5:59	NDSU	Jalen Bussey (#21) 23-yard touchdown reception from Cam Miller (#7), Will Cardinal (#38) kick good	0	57
4th	5:34	10	80	6:12	NDSU	Cole Payton (#15) 37-yard touchdown run, Will Cardinal (#38) kick good	0	64
"TOP" = time of possession. For other American football terms, see Glossary of American football.							0	64

==== Towson ====
North Dakota State Bison (2-0) vs. Towson Tigers (1-1)

Quarter	1	2	3	4	Total
No. 5 Bison	6	15	7	7	35
Tigers	0	0	0	7	7

at Johnny Unitas Stadium, Towson, MD

- Date: September 18, 2021
- Game time: 5:00 p.m. (CT)
- Game weather: Sunny; 80 °F (27 °C)
- Game attendance: 9,109
- TV: FloSports

Statistics	North Dakota State	Towson
First downs	21	12
Plays–yards	58-493	58-200
Rushes–yards	46-328	30-35
Passing yards	165	165
Passing: comp–att–int	6-12-1	19-28-0
Time of possession	30:14	29:43

Team	Category	Player	Statistics
North Dakota State	Passing	Quincy Patterson	6/11, 165 yds, TD, INT
North Dakota State	Rushing	Dominic Gonnella	13 car, 92 yds
North Dakota State	Receiving	Christian Watson	3 rec, 79 yds, TD
Towson	Passing	Chris Ferguson	19/28, 165 yds
Towson	Rushing	Jerry Howard	18 car, 45 yds, TD
Towson	Receiving	Caleb Smith	1 rec, 39 yds

Scoring summary

Quarter	Time	Drive			Team	Scoring information	Score	
Quarter	Time	Plays	Yards	TOP	Team	Scoring information	NDSU	TOW
1st	8:38	4	86	2:05	NDSU	Christian Watson (#1) 67-yard touchdown reception from Quincy Patterson (#2), 2-point rush no good	6	0
2nd	14:57	12	82	6:45	NDSU	Hunter Luepke (#44) 1-yard touchdown run, Jake Reinholz (#37) kick good	13	0
2nd	9:07	7	96	3:32	NDSU	Quincy Patterson (#2) 3-yard touchdown run, Jake Reinholz (#37) kick failed	19	0
2nd	2:15				NDSU	Chris Ferguson (#14) tackled in end zone for a safety by Brayden Thomas (#98)	21	0
3rd	11:02	7	73	3:58	NDSU	TaMerik Williams (#22) 3-yard touchdown run, Jake Reinholz (#37) kick good	28	0
4th	11:35	6	58	3:25	NDSU	Jalen Bussey (#21) 12-yard touchdown run, Jake Reinholz (#37) kick good	35	0
4th	2:20	14	83	5:33	TOW	Jerry Howard (#31) 1-yard touchdown run, Keegan Vaughan (#30) kick good	35	7
"TOP" = time of possession. For other American football terms, see Glossary of American football.							35	7

==== North Dakota ====
North Dakota State Bison (3-0) vs North Dakota Fighting Hawks (2-1)

Quarter	1	2	3	4	Total
No. 5 Bison	3	3	3	7	16
No. 10 Fighting Hawks	7	0	0	3	10

at Alerus Center, Grand Forks, ND

- Date: October 2, 2021
- Game time: 2:00 p.m. (CT)
- Game weather: Indoors; 72 °F (22 °C)
- Game attendance: 12,846
- TV: ESPN+

Statistics	North Dakota State	North Dakota
First downs	13	13
Plays–yards	58-280	61-289
Rushes–yards	47-223	29-113
Passing yards	57	176
Passing: comp–att–int	5-11-0	18-32-1
Time of possession	33:01	26:59

Team	Category	Player	Statistics
North Dakota State	Passing	Quincy Patterson	4/10, 48 yds
North Dakota State	Rushing	Quincy Patterson	19 car, 92 yds, TD
North Dakota State	Receiving	Noah Gindorff	4 rec, 58 yds
North Dakota	Passing	Tommy Schuster	18/30, 176 yds, TD, INT
North Dakota	Rushing	Otis Weah	19 car, 85 yds
North Dakota	Receiving	Luke Skokna	6 rec, 50 yds

Scoring summary

Quarter	Time	Drive			Team	Scoring information	Score	
Quarter	Time	Plays	Yards	TOP	Team	Scoring information	NDSU	UND
1st	4:55	10	38	4:07	NDSU	45-yard field goal by Jake Reinholz (#37)	3	0
1st	1:34	8	73	3:16	UND	Bo Belquist (#1) 30-yard touchdown reception from Tommy Schuster (#2), Adam Stage (#45) kick good	3	7
2nd	13:48	7	32	2:38	NDSU	34-yard field goal by Jake Reinholz (#37)	6	7
3rd	4:34	4	8	2:20	NDSU	30-yard field goal by Jake Reinholz (#37)	9	7
4th	1:13	8	58	4:34	NDSU	Quincy Patterson (#2) 3-yard touchdown run, Jake Reinholz (#37) kick good	16	7
4th	0:16	6	29	0:51	UND	46-yard field goal by Adam Stage (#45)	16	10
"TOP" = time of possession. For other American football terms, see Glossary of American football.							16	10

==== Northern Iowa ====
Northern Iowa Panthers (3-1) vs. North Dakota State Bison (4-0)

Quarter	1	2	3	4	Total
No. 12 Panthers	0	10	7	3	20
No. 5 Bison	10	3	14	7	34

at Fargodome, Fargo, ND

- Date: October 9, 2021
- Game time: 1:00 p.m. (CT)
- Game weather: Indoors; 70 °F (21 °C)
- Game attendance: 18,536
- TV: ESPN+

Statistics	Northern Iowa	North Dakota State
First downs	14	15
Plays–yards	63-381	64-363
Rushes–yards	32-124	43-181
Passing yards	257	182
Passing: comp–att–int	12-31-0	11-21-0
Time of possession	27:37	32:23

Team	Category	Player	Statistics
Northern Iowa	Passing	Theo Day	12/31, 257 yds, TD
Northern Iowa	Rushing	Bradrick Shaw	10 car, 44 yds
Northern Iowa	Receiving	Isaiah Weston	5 rec, 181 yds, TD
North Dakota State	Passing	Quincy Patterson	11/21, 182 yds, 2 TD
North Dakota State	Rushing	Quincy Patterson	12 car, 60 yds, 2 TD
North Dakota State	Receiving	Christian Watson	5 rec, 163 yds, TD

Scoring summary

Quarter	Time	Drive			Team	Scoring information	Score	
Quarter	Time	Plays	Yards	TOP	Team	Scoring information	UNI	NDSU
1st	7:37	1	85	0:11	NDSU	Christian Watson (#1) 85-yard touchdown reception from Quincy Patterson (#2), Jake Reinholz (#37) kick good	0	7
1st	3:37	6	40	2:11	NDSU	27-yard field goal by Jake Reinholz (#37)	0	10
2nd	11:24	8	73	3:36	UNI	Isaiah Weston (#80) 44-yard touchdown reception from Theo Day (#12), Matthew Cook (#97) kick good	7	10
2nd	3:00	8	73	3:36	UNI	33-yard field goal by Matthew Cook (#97)	10	10
2nd	0:23	9	71	2:37	NDSU	22-yard field goal by Jake Reinholz (#37)	10	13
3rd	11:46	2	9	1:12	NDSU	Quincy Patterson (#2) 4-yard touchdown run, Jake Reinholz (#37) kick good	10	20
3rd	9:02	4	21	2:06	NDSU	Noah Gindorff (#87) 3-yard touchdown reception from Quincy Patterson (#2), Jake Reinholz (#37) kick good	10	27
3rd	7:39	3	75	1:23	UNI	Dom Williams (#7) 5-yard touchdown run, Matthew Cook (#98) kick good	17	27
4th	14:09	16	80	8:26	NDSU	Quincy Patterson (#2) 4-yard touchdown run, Jake Reinholz (#37) kick good	17	34
4th	9:08	11	48	5:01	UNI	44-yard field goal by Matthew Cook (#98)	20	34
"TOP" = time of possession. For other American football terms, see Glossary of American football.							20	34

==== Illinois State ====
North Dakota State Bison (5-0) vs. Illinois State Redbirds (2-3)

Quarter	1	2	3	4	Total
No. 3 Bison	7	3	0	10	20
Redbirds	0	0	0	0	0

at Hancock Stadium, Normal, IL

- Date: October 16, 2021
- Game time: 2:00 p.m. (CT)
- Game weather: Sunny; 60 °F (16 °C); S 13 MPH
- Game attendance: 12,416
- TV: ESPN+

Statistics	North Dakota State	Illinois State
First downs	15	9
Plays–yards	70-325	50-99
Rushes–yards	48-201	30-59
Passing yards	124	40
Passing: comp–att–int	13-22-2	4-20-2
Time of possession	37:12	22:48

Team	Category	Player	Statistics
North Dakota State	Passing	Quincy Patterson	13/22, 124 yds, TD, 2 INT
North Dakota State	Rushing	Quincy Patterson	18 car, 100 yds
North Dakota State	Receiving	Phoenix Sproles	3 rec, 46 yds
Illinois State	Passing	Bryce Jefferson	4/18, 40 yds, 2 INT
Illinois State	Rushing	Cole Mueller	8 car, 27 yds
Illinois State	Receiving	Tristan Bailey	1 rec, 15 yds

Scoring summary

Quarter	Time	Drive			Team	Scoring information	Score	
Quarter	Time	Plays	Yards	TOP	Team	Scoring information	NDSU	ILL ST
1st	4:55	7	67	4:06	NDSU	Christian Watson (#1) 4-yard touchdown reception from Quincy Patterson (#2), Jake Reinholz (#37) kick good	7	0
2nd	0:00	6	34	0:42	NDSU	46-yard field goal by Jake Reinholz (#37)	10	0
4th	5:41	9	26	4:35	NDSU	24-yard field goal by Jake Reinholz (#37)	13	0
4th	2:37	5	33	2:23	NDSU	TaMerik Williams (#22) 7-yard touchdown run, Jake Reinholz (#37) kick good	20	0
"TOP" = time of possession. For other American football terms, see Glossary of American football.							20	0

==== Missouri State ====
Missouri State Bears (4-2) vs North Dakota State Bison (6-0)

Quarter	1	2	3	4	Total
No. 17 Bears	10	3	7	0	20
No. 3 Bison	0	10	3	14	27

at Fargodome, Fargo, ND

- Date: October 23, 2021
- Game time: 2:30 p.m. (CT)
- Game weather: Indoors; 70 °F (21 °C)
- Game attendance: 15,559
- Referee: Andrew Speciale
- TV announcers (ESPN+): Dom Izzo and Kyle Emanuel

Statistics	Missouri State	North Dakota State
First downs	15	16
Plays–yards	57-321	61-333
Rushes–yards	32-79	35-144
Passing yards	242	189
Passing: comp–att–int	16-25-1	12-26-1
Time of possession	30:57	29:03

Team	Category	Player	Statistics
Missouri State	Passing	Jason Shelley	16/25, 242 yds, INT
Missouri State	Rushing	Tobias Little	9 car, 41 yds, 2 TD
Missouri State	Receiving	Tyrone Scott	6 rec, 104 yds
North Dakota State	Passing	Cam Miller	7/9, 112 yds, 2 TD
North Dakota State	Rushing	Quincy Patterson	8 car, 56 yds, TD
North Dakota State	Receiving	Christian Watson	4 rec, 106 yds, TD

Scoring summary

Quarter	Time	Drive			Team	Scoring information	Score	
Quarter	Time	Plays	Yards	TOP	Team	Scoring information	MOST	NDSU
1st	12:56	4	7	1:55	MOST	47-yard field goal by Jose Pizano (#38)	3	0
1st	9:07	3	61	1:28	MOST	Tobias Little (#0) 11-yard touchdown run, Jose Pizano (#38) kick good	10	0
2nd	12:09	1	15	0:07	NDSU	Quincy Patterson (#2) 15-yard touchdown run, Jake Reinholz (#37) kick good	10	7
2nd	1:13	11	84	5:44	MOST	25-yard field goal by Jose Pizano (#38)	13	7
2nd	0:00	9	42	1:09	NDSU	46-yard field goal by Jake Reinholz (#37)	13	10
3rd	12:20	5	52	2:40	NDSU	41-yard field goal by Jake Reinholz	13	13
3rd	9:08	6	75	3:06	MOST	Tobias Little (#0) 5-yard touchdown run, Jose Pizano (#38) kick good	20	13
4th	13:40	4	59	1:37	NDSU	Phoenix Sproles (#11) 29-yard touchdown reception from Cam Miller (#7), Jake Reinholz (#37) kick good	20	20
4th	4:57	12	62	7:06	NDSU	Christian Watson (#1) 24-yard touchdown reception from Cam Miller (#7), Jake Reinholz (#37) kick good	20	27
"TOP" = time of possession. For other American football terms, see Glossary of American football.							20	27

==== Indiana State ====
Indiana State Sycamores (4-4) vs North Dakota State Bison (7-0)

Quarter	1	2	3	4	Total
Sycamores	0	0	0	2	2
No. 2 Bison	16	14	7	7	44

at Fargodome, Fargo, ND

- Date: October 30, 2021
- Game time: 2:30 p.m. (CT)
- Game weather: Indoors; 70 °F (21 °C)
- Game attendance: 14,383
- TV: ESPN+

Statistics	Indiana State	North Dakota State
First downs	17	14
Plays–yards	71-275	55-477
Rushes–yards	35-94	38-292
Passing yards	181	185
Passing: comp–att–int	30-36-1	11-17-1
Time of possession	31:37	28:23

Team	Category	Player	Statistics
Indiana State	Passing	Kurtis Wilderman	13/25, 121 yds, INT
Indiana State	Rushing	Peterson Kerlegrand	18 car, 89 yds
Indiana State	Receiving	Dante Hendrix	9 rec, 87 yds
North Dakota State	Passing	Cam Miller	10/14, 179 yds, 3 TD, INT
North Dakota State	Rushing	Kobe Johnson	5 car, 155 yds, TD
North Dakota State	Receiving	Josh Babicz	2 rec, 58 yds, TD

Scoring summary

Quarter	Time	Drive			Team	Scoring information	Score	
Quarter	Time	Plays	Yards	TOP	Team	Scoring information	IN ST	NDSU
1st	10:45	7	72	4:10	NDSU	Josh Babicz (#81) 3-yard touchdown reception from Cam Miller (#7), Jake Reinholz (#37) kick good	0	7
1st	8:24	4	3	1:24	NDSU	43-yard field goal by Jake Reinholz (#37)	0	10
1st	3:03	5	89	2:21	NDSU	TaMerik Williams (#22) 20-yard touchdown run, 2-point rush failed	0	16
2nd	10:01	2	99	0:58	NDSU	Kobe Johnson (#4) 97-yard touchdown run, Jake Reinholz (#37) kick good	0	23
2nd	4:05	6	88	3:36	NDSU	Christian Watson (#1) 8-yard touchdown reception from Cam Miller (#7), Jake Reinholz (#37) kick good	0	30
3rd	8:51	8	50	5:08	NDSU	Hunter Luepke (#44) 1-yard touchdown reception from Cam Miller (#7), Jake Reinholz (#37) kick good	0	37
4th	11:36	2	22	0:47	NDSU	Cole Payton (#15) 18-yard touchdown run, Jake Reinholz (#37) kick good	0	44
4th	6:51				IN ST	Cody Lindquist (#45) tackled in end zone for a safety by Team	2	44
"TOP" = time of possession. For other American football terms, see Glossary of American football.							2	44

==== South Dakota State ====
North Dakota State Bison (8-0) vs. South Dakota State Jackrabbits (6-2)

Quarter	1	2	3	4	Total
No. 2 Bison	7	0	7	5	19
No. 9 Jackrabbits	14	10	3	0	27

at Dana J. Dykhouse Stadium, Brookings, SD

- Date: November 6, 2021
- Game time: 2:00 p.m. (CT)
- Game weather: Sunny; 66 °F (19 °C); S 10 MPH
- Game attendance: 18,122
- TV: ESPN+

Statistics	North Dakota State	South Dakota State
First downs	20	16
Plays–yards	59-365	63-349
Rushes–yards	36-147	40-181
Passing yards	218	168
Passing: comp–att–int	15-23-1	14-23-0
Time of possession	29:55	30:05

Team	Category	Player	Statistics
North Dakota State	Passing	Cam Miller	15/23, 218 yds, 2 TD, INT
North Dakota State	Rushing	Cam Miller	13 car, 59 yds
North Dakota State	Receiving	Christian Watson	3 rec, 82 yds
South Dakota State	Passing	Chris Oladokun	13/22, 157 yds
South Dakota State	Rushing	Pierre Strong Jr.	23 car, 156 yds, 2 TD
South Dakota State	Receiving	Jaxon Janke	6 rec, 118 yds

Scoring summary

Quarter	Time	Drive			Team	Scoring information	Score	
Quarter	Time	Plays	Yards	TOP	Team	Scoring information	NDSU	SDSU
1st	14:44	2	75	0:16	SDSU	Pierre Strong (#20) 75-yard touchdown run, Cole Frahm (#97) kick good	0	7
1st	6:20	5	54	2:23	NDSU	Josh Babicz (#81) 22-yard touchdown reception from Cam Miller (#7), Jake Reinholz (#37) kick good	7	7
1st	0:18	12	75	6:02	SDSU	Pierre Strong (#20) 1-yard touchdown run, Cole Frahm (#97) kick good	7	14
2nd	2:17	16	80	9:24	SDSU	Tucker Kraft (#85) 11-yard touchdown reception from Pierre Strong (#20), Cole Frahm (#97) kick good	7	21
2nd	0:00	7	52	1:35	SDSU	32-yard field goal by Cole Frahm (#97)	7	27
3rd	0:42	12	75	6:53	NDSU	RaJa Nelson (#12) 14-yard touchdown reception from Cam Miller (#7), Jake Reinholz (#37) kick good	14	27
4th	4:21				NDSU	Team tackled in end zone for a safety by Dawson Weber (#2)	16	27
4th	1:09	9	56	3:03	NDSU	33-yard field goal by Jake Reinholz (#37)	19	27
"TOP" = time of possession. For other American football terms, see Glossary of American football.							19	27

==== Youngstown State ====
North Dakota State Bison (8-1) vs. Youngstown State Penguins (2-6)

Quarter	1	2	3	4	Total
No. 5 Bison	7	14	14	14	49
Penguins	0	3	7	7	17

at Stambaugh Stadium, Youngstown, OH

- Date: November 13, 2021
- Game time: 11:00 a.m. (CT)
- Game weather: Cloudy; 39 °F (4 °C); NE 10 mph
- Game attendance: 8,307
- TV: ESPN+

Statistics	North Dakota State	Youngstown State
First downs	20	13
Plays–yards	59-623	65-288
Rushes–yards	45-454	32-59
Passing yards	169	229
Passing: comp–att–int	10-14-0	17-33-1
Time of possession	29:14	30:46

Team	Category	Player	Statistics
North Dakota State	Passing	Cam Miller	10/14, 169 yds, 2 TD
North Dakota State	Rushing	TK Marshall	3 car, 146 yds, TD
North Dakota State	Receiving	Christian Watson	4 rec, 91 yds, TD
Youngstown State	Passing	Mitch Davidson	10/22, 166 yds, 2 TD, INT
Youngstown State	Rushing	Jaleel McLaughlin	11 car, 52 yds
Youngstown State	Receiving	Drew Ogletree	5 rec, 70 yds

Scoring summary

Quarter	Time	Drive			Team	Scoring information	Score	
Quarter	Time	Plays	Yards	TOP	Team	Scoring information	NDSU	YSU
1st	11:45	7	69	3:06	NDSU	Hunter Luepke (#44) 49-yard touchdown run, Jake Reinholz (#37) kick good	7	0
2nd	10:52	16	80	8:08	NDSU	TaMerik Williams (#22) 1-yard touchdown run, Jake Reinholz (#37) kick good	14	0
2nd	6::48	9	49	4:04	YSU	44-yard field goal by Colt McFadden (#19)	14	3
2nd	6:29	1	71	0:12	NDSU	Christian Watson (#1) 71-yard touchdown reception from Cam Miller (#7), Jake Reinholz (#37) kick good	21	3
3rd	13:16	1	50	0:11	NDSU	TaMerik Williams (#22) 50-yard touchdown run, Jake Reinholz (#37) kick good	28	3
3rd	4:07	8	70	4:07	NDSU	Noah Gindorff (#87) 1-yard touchdown reception from Cam Miller (#7), Jake Reinholz (#37) kick good	35	3
3rd	1:04	8	77	2:56	YSU	Bryce Oliver (#0) 2-yard touchdown reception from Mitch Davidson (#14), Colt McFadden (#19) kick good	35	10
4th	10:19	8	60	3:57	YSU	Bryce Oliver (#0) 2-yard touchdown reception from Mitch Davidson (#14), Colt McFadden (#19) kick good	35	17
4th	5:44	2	65	0:44	NDSU	Jalen Bussey (#21) 61-yard touchdown run, Jake Reinholz (#37) kick good	42	17
4th	1:21	2	86	0:58	NDSU	TK Marshall (#28) 84-yard touchdown run, Jake Reinholz (#37) kick good	49	17
"TOP" = time of possession. For other American football terms, see Glossary of American football.							49	17

==== South Dakota ====
South Dakota Coyotes (7-3) vs. North Dakota State Bison (9-1)

Quarter	1	2	3	4	Total
No. 16 Coyotes	0	3	14	7	24
No. 4 Bison	21	7	10	14	52

at Fargodome, Fargo, ND

- Date: November 20, 2021
- Game time: 2:30 p.m. (CT)
- Game weather: Indoors; 70 °F (21 °C)
- Game attendance: 16,252
- TV: ESPN+

Statistics	South Dakota	North Dakota State
First downs	15	27
Plays–yards	54-293	70-522
Rushes–yards	27-97	47-303
Passing yards	196	219
Passing: comp–att–int	21-27-1	19-23-0
Time of possession	24:01	35:59

Team	Category	Player	Statistics
South Dakota	Passing	Carson Camp	21/27, 196 yds, 2 TD, 1 INT
South Dakota	Rushing	Nate Thomas	12 car, 60 yds
South Dakota	Receiving	Jeremiah Webb	3 rec, 54 yds
North Dakota State	Passing	Cam Miller	19/23, 219 yds, TD
North Dakota State	Rushing	Jalen Bussey	5 car, 62 yds, TD
North Dakota State	Receiving	Phoenix Sproles	2 rec, 87 yds, TD

Scoring summary

Quarter	Time	Drive			Team	Scoring information	Score	
Quarter	Time	Plays	Yards	TOP	Team	Scoring information	USD	NDSU
1st	6:46	12	62	5:37	NDSU	TaMerik Williams (#22) 1-yard touchdown run, Jake Reinholz (#37) kick good	0	7
1st	5:17	1	75	0:12	NDSU	Phoenix Sproles (#11) 75-yard touchdown reception from Cam Miller (#7), Jake Reinholz (#37) kick good	0	14
1st	0:18	6	49	3:06	NDSU	Cam Miller (#7) 8-yard touchdown run, Jake Reinholz (#37) kick good	0	21
2nd	12:00	1	43	0:11	NDSU	Christian Watson (#1) 43-yard touchdown run, Jake Reinholz (#37) kick good	0	28
2nd	6:20	11	71	5:35	USD	25-yard field goal by Mason Lorber (#31)	3	28
3rd	12:42				USD	Punt returned 47 yards for touchdown by Carter Bell (#14), Mason Lorber (#31) kick good	10	28
3rd	10:01	7	36	2:34	NDSU	30-yard field goal by Jake Reinholz (#37)	10	31
3rd	4:05	9	55	4:08	NDSU	TaMerik Williams (#22) 8-yard touchdown run, Jake Reinholz (#37) kick good	10	38
3rd	3:15	4	75	0:50	USD	Mike Mansaray (#21) 40-yard touchdown reception from Carson Camp (#18), Mason Lorber (#31) kick good	17	38
4th	14:26	7	65	3:49	NDSU	Jalen Bussey (#21) 20-yard touchdown run, Jake Reinholz (#37) kick good	17	45
4th	10:48	7	31	3:32	NDSU	Kobe Johnson (#4) 2-yard touchdown run, Jake Reinholz (#37) kick good	17	52
4th	5:28	13	75	5:20	USD	JJ Galbreath (#82) 8-yard touchdown reception from Carson Camp (#18), Mason Lorber (#31) kick good	24	52
"TOP" = time of possession. For other American football terms, see Glossary of American football.							24	52

=== NCAA Division I Playoffs ===
==== Southern Illinois (second round) ====
Southern Illinois Salukis (8-4) vs. North Dakota State Bison (10-1)

Quarter	1	2	3	4	Total
No. 21 Salukis	0	7	0	0	7
No. 3 (2) Bison	10	14	7	7	38

at Fargodome, Fargo, ND

- Date: December 4, 2021
- Game time: 2:30 p.m. (CT)
- Game weather: Indoors; 70 °F (21 °C)
- Game attendance: 12,557
- TV announcers (ESPN+): Jason Ross, Tyoka Jackson

Statistics	Southern Illinois	North Dakota State
First downs	14	29
Plays–yards	59-281	76-477
Rushes–yards	26-61	62-389
Passing yards	220	88
Passing: comp–att–int	23-33-0	9-14-1
Time of possession	22:15	37:45

Team	Category	Player	Statistics
Southern Illinois	Passing	Nic Baker	23/32, 220 yds, TD
Southern Illinois	Rushing	Javon Williams Jr.	8 car, 42 yds
Southern Illinois	Receiving	Tyce Daniel	4 rec, 85 yds
North Dakota State	Passing	Cam Miller	9/14, 88 yds, INT
North Dakota State	Rushing	TaMerik Williams	17 car, 112 yds, 2 TD
North Dakota State	Receiving	Noah Gindorff	3 rec, 35 yds

Scoring summary

Quarter	Time	Drive			Team	Scoring information	Score	
Quarter	Time	Plays	Yards	TOP	Team	Scoring information	SIU	NDSU
1st	7:37	9	83	4:44	NDSU	Cam Miller (#7) 9-yard touchdown run, Jake Reinholz (#37) kick good	0	7
1st	1:58	9	65	3:51	NDSU	20-yard field goal by Jake Reinholz (#37)	0	10
2nd	14:54	5	75	2:04	SIU	Landon Lenoir (#17) 22-yard touchdown reception from Nic Baker (#8), Nico Gualdoni (#99) kick good	7	10
2nd	7:45	13	65	7:09	NDSU	TaMerik Williams (#22) 1-yard touchdown run, Jake Reinholz (#37) kick good	7	17
2nd	2:00	11	63	4:58	NDSU	Cam Miller (#7) 5-yard touchdown run, Jake Reinholz (#37) kick good	7	24
3rd	6:29	15	75	8:31	NDSU	TaMerik Williams (#22) 1-yard touchdown run, Jake Reinholz (#37) kick good	7	31
4th	2:38	5	61	2:52	NDSU	Quincy Patterson (#2) 32-yard touchdown run, Jake Reinholz (#37) kick good	7	38
"TOP" = time of possession. For other American football terms, see Glossary of American football.							7	38

==== East Tennessee State (quarterfinal) ====
East Tennessee State Buccaneers (11-1) vs. North Dakota State Bison (11-1)

Quarter	1	2	3	4	Total
No. 8 (7) Buccaneers	0	0	3	0	3
No. 3 (2) Bison	0	13	7	7	27

at Fargodome, Fargo, ND

- Date: December 11, 2021
- Game time: 11:00 a.m. (CT)
- Game weather: Indoors; 70 °F (21 °C)
- Game attendance: 11,794
- TV announcers (ESPN): Anish Shroff, Mike Golic Jr., Taylor McGregor

Statistics	East Tennessee State	North Dakota State
First downs	11	22
Plays–yards	58-165	66-401
Rushes–yards	25-66	49-278
Passing yards	99	128
Passing: comp–att–int	17-33-1	10-17-0
Time of possession	26:36	33:24

Team	Category	Player	Statistics
East Tennessee State	Passing	Tyler Riddell	16/32, 92 yds, INT
East Tennessee State	Rushing	Quay Holmes	14 car, 35 yds
East Tennessee State	Receiving	Malik Murray	6 rec, 40 yds
North Dakota State	Passing	Cam Miller	10/17, 123 yds
North Dakota State	Rushing	TaMerik Williams	15 car, 91 yds, 2 TD
North Dakota State	Receiving	Josh Babicz	3 rec, 49 yds

Scoring summary

Quarter	Time	Drive			Team	Scoring information	Score	
Quarter	Time	Plays	Yards	TOP	Team	Scoring information	ETSU	NDSU
2nd	7:04	8	62	4:31	NDSU	TaMerik Williams (#22) 3-yard touchdown run, 2-point rush failed	0	6
2nd	0:51	9	76	4:19	NDSU	TaMerik Williams (#22) 7-yard touchdown run, Jake Reinholz (#37) kick good	0	13
3rd	6:06	4	46	1:54	NDSU	Cam Miller (#7) 3-yard touchdown run, Jake Reinholz (#37) kick good	0	20
3rd	1:35	5	8	1:51	ETSU	40-yard field goal by Tyler Keltner (#82)	3	20
4th	6:18	12	82	6:13	NDSU	Hunter Luepke (#44) 11-yard touchdown run, Jake Reinholz (#37) kick good	3	27
"TOP" = time of possession. For other American football terms, see Glossary of American football.							3	27

==== James Madison (semifinal) ====
James Madison Dukes (12-1) vs. North Dakota State Bison (12-1)

Quarter	1	2	3	4	Total
No. 2 (3) Dukes	0	0	14	0	14
No. 3 (2) Bison	7	6	0	7	20

at Fargodome, Fargo, ND

- Date: December 18, 2021
- Game time: 8:15 p.m. (CT)
- Game weather: Indoors; 70 °F (21 °C)
- Game attendance: 16,550
- TV announcers (ESPN2): Wes Durham, Barrett Brooks, Lauren Sisler

Statistics	James Madison	North Dakota State
First downs	18	19
Plays–yards	61-308	62-339
Rushes–yards	27-95	43-174
Passing yards	210	165
Passing: comp–att–int	25-34-2	10-19-0
Time of possession	27:29	32:31

Team	Category	Player	Statistics
James Madison	Passing	Cole Johnson	25/34, 210 yds, 2 TD, 2 INT
James Madison	Rushing	Latrele Palmer	18 car, 89 yds
James Madison	Receiving	Solomon Vanhorse	8 rec, 57 yds
North Dakota State	Passing	Cam Miller	10/19, 165 yds, 2 TD
North Dakota State	Rushing	Hunter Luepke	19 car, 110 yds
North Dakota State	Receiving	Hunter Luepke	3 rec, 89 yds, 2 TD

Scoring summary

Quarter	Time	Drive			Team	Scoring information	Score	
Quarter	Time	Plays	Yards	TOP	Team	Scoring information	JMU	NDSU
1st	5:12	5	60	2:36	NDSU	Hunter Luepke (#44) 32-yard touchdown reception from Cam Miller (#7), Jake Reinholz (#37) kick good	0	7
2nd	13:03	8	47	4:03	NDSU	43-yard field goal by Jake Reinholz (#37)	0	10
2nd	0:02	15	74	6:13	NDSU	20-yard field goal by Jake Reinholz (#37)	0	13
3rd	8:51	13	80	6:01	JMU	Antwane Wells Jr. (#7) 13-yard touchdown reception from Cole Johnson (#12), Ethan Ratke (#91) kick good	7	13
3rd	1:26	6	41	2:10	JMU	Devin Ravenel (#19) 4-yard touchdown reception from Cole Johnson (#12), Ethan Ratke (#91) kick good	14	13
4th	13:44	6	73	2:34	NDSU	Hunter Luepke (#44) 22-yard touchdown reception from Cam Miller (#7), Jake Reinholz (#37) kick good	14	20
"TOP" = time of possession. For other American football terms, see Glossary of American football.							14	20

==== Montana State (National Championship) ====
Montana State Bobcats (12-2) vs. North Dakota State Bison (13-1)

Quarter	1	2	3	4	Total
No. 7 (8) Bobcats	0	0	3	7	10
No. 3 (2) Bison	7	21	10	0	38

at Toyota Stadium, Frisco, TX

- Date: January 8, 2022
- Game time: 11:00 a.m. (CT)
- Game weather: Cloudy; 48 °F (9 °C); SE 9 mph
- Game attendance: 18,942
- TV announcers (ESPN2): Dave Flemming, Jay Walker, Stormy Buonantony

Statistics	Montana State	North Dakota State
First downs	17	22
Plays–yards	65-335	66-504
Rushes–yards	34-156	53-378
Passing yards	179	126
Passing: comp–att–int	15-31-1	9-13-0
Time of possession	26:12	33:48

Team	Category	Player	Statistics
Montana State	Passing	Tucker Rovig	13/28, 156 yds, TD, INT
Montana State	Rushing	Isaiah Ifanse	18 car, 84 yds
Montana State	Receiving	Lance McCutcheon	5 rec, 106 yds, TD
North Dakota State	Passing	Cam Miller	9/13, 126 yds, TD
North Dakota State	Rushing	Kobe Johnson	4 car, 106 yds, TD
North Dakota State	Receiving	Christian Watson	4 rec, 61 yds

Scoring summary

Quarter	Time	Drive			Team	Scoring information	Score	
Quarter	Time	Plays	Yards	TOP	Team	Scoring information	MON ST	NDSU
1st	6:48	11	80	5:01	NDSU	Hunter Luepke (#44) 8-yard touchdown run, Jake Reinholz (#37) kick good	0	7
2nd	14:56	7	75	3:22	NDSU	Hunter Luepke (#44) 11-yard touchdown run, Jake Reinholz (#37) kick good	0	14
2nd	10:50	2	75	0:50	NDSU	Kobe Johnson (#4) 76-yard touchdown run, Jake Reinholz (#37) kick good	0	21
2nd	0:32	14	85	4:54	NDSU	Hunter Luepke (#44) 6-yard touchdown run, Jake Reinholz (#37) kick good	0	28
3rd	12:34	5	65	2:26	NDSU	Josh Babicz (#81) 35-yard touchdown reception from Cam Miller (#7), Jake Reinholz (#37) kick good	0	35
3rd	7:43	12	67	4:51	MON ST	26-yard field goal by Blake Glessner (#39)	3	35
3rd	0:38	7	28	3:35	NDSU	37-yard field goal by Jake Reinholz (#37)	3	38
4th	5:08	11	80	4:43	MON ST	Lance McCutcheon (#86) 28-yard touchdown reception from Tucker Rovig (#12), Blake Glessner (#39) kick good	10	38
"TOP" = time of possession. For other American football terms, see Glossary of American football.							10	38

== Roster ==
2021 North Dakota State Bison football team roster
Players
Coaches
Offense

Pos.	#	Name	Class
WR	0	Zach Mathis	Jr
WR	1	Christian Watson	Sr
QB	2	Quincy Patterson	Jr
RB	4	Kobe Johnson	Jr
WR	5	Bryce Lance	Fr
QB	7	Cam Miller	So
RB	8	Mitchell Kartes	Jr
WR	9	DJ Hart	So
WR	11	Phoenix Sproles	Sr
WR	12	Braylon Henderson	So
WR	13	Eli Green	Fr
QB	14	JJ Woodin	Fr
QB	15	Cole Payton	Fr
QB	16	Peter Anderson	Fr
WR	17	Raja Nelson	So
WR	19	Jake Lippe	So
RB	21	Jalen Bussey	So
RB	22	Tamerik Williams	Jr
RB	26	Nathan Goldade	Fr
WR	28	TK Marshall	So
RB	29	Dominic Gonnella	So
RB	30	Barika Kpeenu	Fr
FB	33	Logan Hofstedt	So
FB	34	Luke Waters	Jr
RB	36	Owen Johnson	Fr
TE	40	Travis Yohnke	So
FB	44	Hunter Luepke	Jr
FB	46	Truman Werremeyer	Fr
FB	49	Hunter Brozio	So
C	57	Braden Rucker	Fr
G	59	Hayden Johnston	Fr
OT	60	Seth Anderson	Fr
G	63	Jake Kubas	Jr
G	66	Nash Jensen	Sr
OT	67	Cordell Volson	Sr
OT	68	Sam Henry	Fr
OT	70	Cody Mauch	Sr
G	71	Luke Lacilento	Sr
C	72	Jalen Sundell	Jr
OT	73	Mason Miller	So
G	74	Grey Zabel	So
OT	75	Trevor Fiecko	Fr
OT	76	Hunter Poncius	So
C	77	Brandon Westberg	So
OT	78	Jake Rock	So
WR	80	Tyler Terhark	Fr
TE	81	Josh Babicz	Sr
TE	82	Joe Stoffel	So
WR	83	Giancarlo Volpentesta	So
WR	84	Adrian Adams	So
WR	84	Chris Harris	Fr
TE	85	Gabe Lloyd	Sr
TE	87	Noah Gindorff	Sr
TE	88	Andre Carrier	Fr
TE	89	Finn Diggins	Fr
RB	-	Seth Wilson	Sr

Defense

Pos.	#	Name	Class
CB	1	Britton Pascoe	Fr
S	2	Dawson Webber	Sr
LB	3	Jasir Cox	Sr
CB	5	Jerodd Vines	Jr
CB	6	Destin Talbert	Sr
S	10	Dom Jones	So
CB	13	Anthony Coleman	So
S	16	Tyson Gordon	Fr
CB	18	Courtney Eubanks	So
S	20	Julian Wlodarczyk	Jr
S	21	Ryan Jones	Fr
CB	22	Dalton Tieman	Fr
CB	23	Jayden Price	Jr
CB	24	Jenaro Ocama	So
S	25	Michael Tutsie	Sr
LB	26	James Kaczor	Sr
CB	27	Marques Sigle	Fr
S	29	Reggie King	Fr
S	30	Enock Sibomana	Fr
LB	31	Cole Wisniewski	So
S	32	Ty Satter	Fr
S	35	Sam Jung	So
LB	36	Nick Kubitz	So
LB	39	Cade Powers	So
CB	40	Alex Oechsner	Fr
LB	42	Oscar Benson	Fr
LB	43	Logan Kopp	Fr
LB	45	Nathan Kraft	So
LB	47	Luke Weerts	Jr
LB	49	Carter Borchardt	Fr
LB	50	Brayden Weber	Fr
LB	51	Mason Hofstedt	Sr
LB	52	Jackson Hankey	Sr
DT	53	Eli Mostaert	So
DE	54	Jake Kava	Jr
DE	55	Kole Menz	Fr
DE	56	Loshiaka Roques	Fr
DT	58	Javier Derritt	So
LB	59	Dylan Taves	So
DT	61	Kody Huisman	Fr
DT	64	Jaxon Duttenhefer	Fr
DT	65	Bryce Friday	Fr
DE	90	Tony Pierce	Jr
DE	91	Will Mostaert	So
DT	92	Lane Tucker	Sr
DE	93	Logan McCormick	Sr
DT	94	Costner Ching	Sr
DT	95	Michael Buetow	Sr
DE	96	Ryan Reed	So
DE	97	Bartholomew Ogbu	Sr
DE	98	Brayden Thomas	Sr
DE	99	Spencer Waege	Sr
LB	-	Dylan Hendricks	So

Special teams

Pos.	#	Name	Class
K	31	Nathan Whiting	Fr
K	37	Jake Reinholz	Sr
P	38	Will Cardinal	So
K	39	Griffin Crosa	Jr
P	41	Kaedin Steindorf	Fr
P	45	Cody Lindquist	Jr
LS	48	Mike Florentine	Fr

Head coach

- Matt Entz (head coach)

Coordinators/assistant coaches

- Randy Hedberg (Associate HC / passing game coordinator / quarterbacks)
- Tyler Roehl (offensive coordinator / tight ends / fullbacks)
- David Braun (defensive coordinator / safeties)
- Nick Goeser (special teams coordinator / Defensive tackles)
- Kody Morgan (cornerbacks)
- Joe Beschorner (running backs)
- Dan Larson (offensive line)
- Grant Olson (linebackers)
- Noah Pauley (wide receivers)
- Buddha Williams (defensive ends)
- Connor Senger (offensive quality control)
- Lee Pronschinske (defensive quality control)

Legend

- (C) Team captain
- (S) Suspended
- (I) Ineligible
- Injured
- Redshirt

Roster
Last update: July 1, 2021

== 2022 NFL draft ==
The following Bison players were selected in the 2022 NFL draft.

Player	Position	School	Draft Round	Round Pick	Overall Pick	Team	Notes
Christian Watson	WR	North Dakota State	2	2	34	Green Bay Packers	from Detroit via Minnesota
Cordell Volson	OT	North Dakota State	4	31	136	Cincinnati Bengals	
