= 2021 Delaware Fightin' Blue Hens football team =

American college football season

2021 Delaware Fightin' Blue Hens football
- Conference: Colonial Athletic Association
- Record: 5–6 (3–5 CAA)
- Head coach: Danny Rocco (5th season)
- Offensive coordinator: Jared Ambrose (3rd season)
- Offensive scheme: Spread
- Defensive coordinator: Manny Rojas (2nd season)
- Base defense: 3–3–5
- Home stadium: Delaware Stadium

2021 Colonial Athletic Association football standings
	Conf.			Overall
Team	W		L	W		L
No. 3 James Madison +^	7	–	1	12	–	2
No. 8 Villanova +^	7	–	1	10	–	3
Elon	5	–	3	6	–	5
Rhode Island	4	–	4	7	–	4
Maine	4	–	4	6	–	5
Richmond	4	–	4	6	–	5
William & Mary	4	–	4	6	–	5
Stony Brook	4	–	4	5	–	6
Delaware	3	–	5	5	–	6
Towson	3	–	5	4	–	7
New Hampshire	2	–	6	3	–	8
Albany	1	–	7	2	–	9
+ – Conference co-champions; ^ – FCS playoff participant; Rankings from STATS Poll

The 2021 Delaware Fightin' Blue Hens football team represented the University of Delaware as a member of the Colonial Athletic Association (CAA) during the 2021 NCAA Division I FCS football season. Led by Danny Rocco in his fifth and final season as head coach, the Fightin' Blue Hens compiled an overall record of 5–6 with a mark of 3–5 in conference play, tying for ninth place in the CAA. The team played home games at Delaware Stadium in Newark, Delaware. Rocco was fired at the end of the season.

== Schedule ==
Date	Time	Opponent	Rank	Site	TV	Result	Attendance
September 2	7:00 p.m.	at Maine	No. 5	Alfond Stadium; Orono, ME	FloSports	W 34–24	5,548
September 11	6:00 p.m.	Saint Francis (PA)*	No. 6	Delaware Stadium; Newark, DE	FloSports	W 27–10	13,351
September 18	3:30 p.m.	at Rutgers*	No. 6	SHI Stadium; Piscataway, NJ	BTN	L 13–45	40,129
October 2	3:00 p.m.	Albany	No. 9	Delaware Stadium; Newark, DE	NBCSPHI+/FloSports	W 20–15	18,080
October 9	1:00 p.m.	at No. 18 Rhode Island	No. 9	Meade Stadium; Kingston, RI	FloSports	L 15–22	4,917
October 16	3:30 p.m.	at Stony Brook	No. 14	Kenneth P. LaValle Stadium; Stony Brook, NY	FloSports	L 17–34	5,590
October 23	3:00 p.m.	No. 7 James Madison^{†}	No. 23	Delaware Stadium; Newark, DE (rivalry)	NBCSPHI/FloSports	L 10–22	15,783
October 30	1:00 p.m.	Dixie State*		Delaware Stadium; Newark, DE	FloSports	W 17–10	8,391
November 6	1:00 p.m.	No. T–20 William & Mary		Delaware Stadium; Newark, DE (rivalry)	FloSports	W 24–3	10,021
November 13	2:00 p.m.	at Richmond		E. Claiborne Robins Stadium; Richmond, VA	NBCSWA/FloSports	L 27–51	6,104
November 20	1:00 p.m.	No. 6 Villanova		Delaware Stadium; Newark, DE (Battle of the Blue)	NBCSPHI/FloSports	L 13–21	11,437
*Non-conference game; ^{†}Homecoming; Rankings from STATS Poll released prior to the game; All times are in Eastern time
