= 2021 New Hampshire Wildcats football team =

College of the Holy Cross in the 2021 NCAA Division I FCS football season

2021 New Hampshire Wildcats football
- Conference: Colonial Athletic Association
- Record: 3–8 (2–6 CAA)
- Head coach: Sean McDonnell (22nd season)
- Co-offensive coordinators: Michael Ferzoco (3rd season); Brian Scott (1st season)
- Defensive coordinator: John Lyons (11th season)
- Home stadium: Wildcat Stadium

2021 Colonial Athletic Association football standings
	Conf.			Overall
Team	W		L	W		L
No. 3 James Madison +^	7	–	1	12	–	2
No. 8 Villanova +^	7	–	1	10	–	3
Elon	5	–	3	6	–	5
Rhode Island	4	–	4	7	–	4
Maine	4	–	4	6	–	5
Richmond	4	–	4	6	–	5
William & Mary	4	–	4	6	–	5
Stony Brook	4	–	4	5	–	6
Delaware	3	–	5	5	–	6
Towson	3	–	5	4	–	7
New Hampshire	2	–	6	3	–	8
Albany	1	–	7	2	–	9
+ – Conference co-champions; ^ – FCS playoff participant; Rankings from STATS Poll

The 2021 New Hampshire Wildcats football team represented the University of New Hampshire as a member of the Colonial Athletic Association (CAA) in the 2021 NCAA Division I FCS football season. The Wildcats, led by 22nd-year head coach Sean McDonnell, played their home games at Wildcat Stadium.

== Schedule ==
Date	Time	Opponent	Rank	Site	TV	Result	Attendance	Source
September 2	6:00 p.m.	at Stony Brook		Kenneth P. LaValle Stadium; Stony Brook, NY	FloFootball	W 27–21	6,177	
September 11	6:00 p.m.	Towson		Wildcat Stadium; Durham, NH	FloFootball	W 26–14	10,247	
September 18	12:30 p.m.	at Lafayette*	No. 23	Fisher Stadium; Easton, PA	ESPN+	W 19–13	2,623	
September 25	12:00 p.m.	at Pittsburgh*	No. 21	Heinz Field; Pittsburgh, PA	ACCN+	L 7–77	41,048	
October 2	3:30 p.m.	No. 3 James Madison	No. 25	Wildcat Stadium; Durham, NH	FloFootball	L 21–23	17,323	
October 16	1:00 p.m.	Dartmouth*	No. 23	Wildcat Stadium; Durham, NH	FloFootball	L 21–38	15,394	
October 23	2:00 p.m.	at Elon		Rhodes Stadium; Elon, NC	FloFootball	L 10–24	6,124	
October 30	1:00 p.m.	Richmond		Wildcat Stadium; Durham, NH	FloFootball	L 21–35	6,341	
November 6	1:00 p.m.	at Albany		Bob Ford Field at Tom & Mary Casey Stadium; Albany, NY	FloFootball	L 7–20	2,988	
November 13	1:00 p.m.	at Rhode Island		Meade Stadium; Kingston, RI	FloFootball	L 3–28	4,661	
November 20	1:00 p.m.	Maine		Wildcat Stadium; Durham, NH (Battle for the Brice–Cowell Musket)	FloFootball	L 20–33	8,573	
*Non-conference game; Rankings from STATS Poll released prior to the game; All times are in Eastern time
