= 2021 Maine Black Bears football team =

American college football season

2021 Maine Black Bears football
- Conference: Colonial Athletic Association
- Record: 6–5 (4–4 CAA)
- Head coach: Nick Charlton (3rd season)
- Offensive coordinator: Andrew Dresner (3rd season)
- Defensive coordinator: Michael Ryan (3rd season)
- Home stadium: Alfond Stadium

2021 Colonial Athletic Association football standings
	Conf.			Overall
Team	W		L	W		L
No. 3 James Madison +^	7	–	1	12	–	2
No. 8 Villanova +^	7	–	1	10	–	3
Elon	5	–	3	6	–	5
Rhode Island	4	–	4	7	–	4
Maine	4	–	4	6	–	5
Richmond	4	–	4	6	–	5
William & Mary	4	–	4	6	–	5
Stony Brook	4	–	4	5	–	6
Delaware	3	–	5	5	–	6
Towson	3	–	5	4	–	7
New Hampshire	2	–	6	3	–	8
Albany	1	–	7	2	–	9
+ – Conference co-champions; ^ – FCS playoff participant; Rankings from STATS Poll

The 2021 Maine Black Bears football team represented the University of Maine as a member of the Colonial Athletic Association (CAA) in the 2021 NCAA Division I FCS football season. The Black Bears, led by third-year head coach Nick Charlton, played their home games at Alfond Stadium.

== Transfers ==
=== Outgoing ===
Over the off-season, Maine lost fourteen players through the transfer portal. Of this group, twelve players committed to new schools.

Name	Pos.	New school
Quincy Barber	S	Towson
John Benson	TE	Lafayette
Liam Dobson	OL	Texas State
George French	OT	Pitt
Donnell Henriquez	CB	Lackawanna C.C.
Mike-Lee Joseph	S	Sacred Heart
Ori Jean-Charles	LB	Albany
Sterling McDowell-Hagans	DB	Unknown
Curtis Murray	RB	Towson
Nnamdi Onyemelukwe	DT	Saint Francis
Shawn Page	OG	Merrimack
Deshawn Stevens	LB	West Virginia
Jordan Swann	CB	James Madison
Myles Taylor	LB	Merrimack
Rhakim Williams	LB	Unknown

=== Incoming ===
Over the off-season, Maine added nine players through the transfer portal.

Name	Pos.	Class	Previous school
PJ Barr	OL	GR	Bucknell
Harvey Clayton, Jr.	DB	GR	Duquesne
Jamond DuBose	S	GR	Northern Colorado
Tyrell Edwards	CB	FR	Dodge City C.C.
John Gay	RB	JR	Lafayette
Brian Lee, Jr.	LB	JR	Saint Francis
Ray Miller	LB	GR	Campbell
Xavier Mitchell	DL	GR	Arkansas-Pine Bluff
Vladimir Rivas	K/P	SR	Florida Atlantic

== Schedule ==
Date	Time	Opponent	Site	TV	Result	Attendance
September 2	7:00 p.m.	No. 5 Delaware	Alfond Stadium; Orono, ME	FloFootball	L 24–34	5,548
September 11	4:00 p.m.	at No. 3 James Madison	Bridgeforth Stadium; Harrisonburg, VA	NBCSW/FloFootball	L 7–55	22,108
September 18	12:00 p.m.	Merrimack*	Alfond Stadium; Orono, ME	FloFootball	W 31–26	5,041
September 25	2:30 p.m.	at Northern Illinois*	Huskie Stadium; DeKalb, IL	ESPN3	L 14–41	10,076
October 9	12:00 p.m.	Elon	Alfond Stadium; Orono, ME	FloFootball	L 23–33	4,174
October 16	12:00 p.m.	William & Mary	Alfond Stadium; Orono, ME	FloFootball	W 27–16	6,356
October 23	1:00 p.m.	at Albany	Bob Ford Field at Tom & Mary Casey Stadium; Albany, NY	FloFootball	W 19–16	3,089
October 30	1:00 p.m.	at No. 24 Rhode Island	Meade Stadium; Kingston, RI	FloFootball	W 45–34	3,368
November 6	12:00 p.m.	Stony Brook	Alfond Stadium; Orono, ME	FloFootball	L 17–22	4,137
November 13	3:30 p.m.	at UMass*	Warren McGuirk Alumni Stadium; Hadley, MA	FloFootball	W 35–10	5,331
November 20	1:00 p.m.	at New Hampshire	Wildcat Stadium; Durham, NH	FloFootball	W 33–20	8,573
*Non-conference game; Rankings from STATS Poll released prior to the game; All times are in Eastern time

== Roster ==
2021 Maine Black Bears football team roster
Players
Coaches
Offense

Pos.	#	Name	Class
QB	1	Joe Fagnano	Jr
WR	2	Devin Young	Sr
QB	5	Joey McCracken	Fr
WR	10	Andre Miller	Sr
TE	12	Daniel Rymer	Sr
QB	13	Derek Robertson	Fr
QB	14	Anthony Harris	Fr
WR	17	Zavier Scott	Sr
TE	18	Shawn Bowman	Jr
QB	18	Jack Kelley	Fr
RB	20	Elijah Barnwell	Jr
RB	25	Tavion Banks	So
RB	28	Freddie Brock	So
RB	33	Larry St. Pierre	Fr
WR	34	Logan Martin	Fr
RB	35	Jordan Rowell	Sr
TE	45	Eli Mahan	Fr
RB	46	John Gay	Jr
TE	48	Declan McKevitt	Fr
TE	49	Jack Corcoran	Fr
OL	54	Justice Olivares	Fr
OL	55	Darius Bell	Fr
OL	57	David Gross	Fr
OL	61	Justin Williford	So
OL	62	Michael Gerace	Sr
OL	63	Jack Webb	Sr
OL	65	Tim Burgartz	Fr
OL	66	Matthias Staalsoe	Jr
OL	67	Tyler Royal	Sr
OL	70	Marek Veal	Fr
OL	71	Gunnar Docos	Sr
OL	74	P.J. Barr	Sr
OL	76	Tyrie Francois	Jr
OL	77	Kevin Jones	Jr
OL	78	Zachary Reed	So
OL	79	Max Lövblad	So
WR	80	Jamie Lamson	So
WR	81	Montigo Moss	So
WR	83	Michael Monios	So
WR	84	Trevin Ewing	So
TE	85	Matt Toman	Fr
TE	86	Steve Petrick	Sr
TE	86	Antonio Corsi	Fr
WR	87	Jacob Hennie	Sr
WR	88	Jalen Jordan	Jr
WR	89	Garrison Burnett	Sr

Defense †

Pos.	#	Name	Class
CB	3	Richard Carr	Sr
CB	4	Katley Joseph	Sr
DT	5	Josh Lezin	Jr
LB	6	Ray Miller	Sr
LB	7	Xavier Nurse	So
CB	8	Shaquille St-Lot	Sr
DE	9	Jamehl Wiley	Sr
DE	11	Khairi Manns	So
CB	13	Tyrese Baptiste	Fr
S	14	Harvey Clayton Jr.	Sr
LB	15	Brian Lee Jr.	Jr
DE	16	Xavier Mitchell	Sr
S	21	Austin Ambush	So
CB	22	Benito Speight	Sr
LB	23	Adrian Otero	Sr
S	24	Fofie Bazzie	Sr
S	26	Jamond DuBose	Sr
CB	27	Tyrell Edwards	Fr
DT	29	Austin Chambers	Sr
CB	30	Kahzir Brown	Fr
S	31	Robby Riobe	So
LB	32	Vince Thomas	Fr
LB	33	Christian Thomas	Fr
CB	34	Kolubah Pewee Jr.	Fr
CB	36	Jabari Echols	Fr
DE	38	Bryce Henaire	Fr
DB	39	Darius Minor	Sr
LB	40	Tyshawn Stewart	Fr
S	41	Shakur Smalls	Fr
S	42	Abdul Stewart	Fr
DT	44	Raffaele Salamone	Sr
CB	45	Daniel Doegan	Fr
S	46	Jylun Spence	Fr
LB	47	Darius McKenzie	Fr
DB	49	Nassir Young	Fr
LB	50	Latrell Couchman	Fr
DT	52	John Costanza	So
LB	53	Isaac Ofielu	Fr
DE	56	Jacob Tuiasosopo	So
DT	58	Chris Glass	So
DE	90	Xavier Holmes	Fr
DT	91	Shymell Davis	Fr
DT	95	Justin Sambu	Jr
DE	96	Dorian Royal	Fr
DE	97	Garrett Graham	Jr

Special teams

Pos.	#	Name	Class
LS	0	Bryce Colee	Sr
P	19	David Gelb	Sr
K/P	20	Vladimir Rivas	Sr
K	37	Jonny Messina	Sr
LS/LB	43	Charles Eberle	Fr
K	92	Richie Pekmezian	Jr
K/P	93	Brian Cooey	Jr
LS	94	Clayton Ritter	Fr
K/P	98	Cole Baker	Fr

Head coach

- Nick Charlton (Boston College)

Coordinators/assistant coaches

- Andrew Dresner (Union)
  Offensive coordinator/quarterbacks
- Michael Ryan (Connecticut)
  Defensive coordinator/linebackers
- Jared Keyte (Utica)
  Special teams coordinator/safeties
- Pat Denecke (Washington & Jefferson)
  Assistant head coach/run game coordinator/offensive line
- Justin Flores (Maine)
  Wide receivers/recruiting coordinator
- Kurt Von Bargen (East Carolina)
  Defensive line
- Makana Garrigan (Nevada)
  Cornerbacks
- Mikal Myers (Connecticut)
  Defensive tackles
- Mikahael Waters (Nevada)
  Tight ends
- Kenney Tinsley (Central State)
  Running backs
- Kayon Whitaker (Maine)
  Defensive quality control/assistant operations
- Thomas Hanscom (Maine)
  Director of football operations
- Jon Lynch (Westfield State)
  Director of sports performance
- Matthew Mulligan (Maine)
  Volunteer assistant sports performance coach/coaching assistant
- Shelby Coker
  Assistant equipment manager
- Jessica Bishop
  Athletic academic counselor – tutor/mentor coordinator
- Kristin Gilmour
  Athletic academic counselor

Legend

- (C) Team captain
- (S) Suspended
- (I) Ineligible
- Injured
- Redshirt

Roster
Last update: July 9, 2021
