= 2021 Richmond Spiders football team =

American college football season

2021 Richmond Spiders football
- Conference: Colonial Athletic Association
- Record: 6–5 (4–4 CAA)
- Head coach: Russ Huesman (5th season)
- Offensive coordinator: Jeff Durden (4th season)
- Defensive coordinator: Justin Wood (2nd season)
- Home stadium: E. Claiborne Robins Stadium

2021 Colonial Athletic Association football standings
	Conf.			Overall
Team	W		L	W		L
No. 3 James Madison +^	7	–	1	12	–	2
No. 8 Villanova +^	7	–	1	10	–	3
Elon	5	–	3	6	–	5
Rhode Island	4	–	4	7	–	4
Maine	4	–	4	6	–	5
Richmond	4	–	4	6	–	5
William & Mary	4	–	4	6	–	5
Stony Brook	4	–	4	5	–	6
Delaware	3	–	5	5	–	6
Towson	3	–	5	4	–	7
New Hampshire	2	–	6	3	–	8
Albany	1	–	7	2	–	9
+ – Conference co-champions; ^ – FCS playoff participant; Rankings from STATS Poll

The 2021 Richmond Spiders football team represented the University of Richmond as a member of the Colonial Athletic Association (CAA) in the 2021 NCAA Division I FCS football season. The Spiders, led by fifth-year head coach Russ Huesman, played their home games at E. Claiborne Robins Stadium.

== Preseason ==
=== CAA poll ===
In the CAA preseason poll released on July 27, 2021, the Spiders were predicted to finish in fourth place and received two first-place votes.

Predicted finish	Team	Votes (1st place)
1	James Madison	231 (15)
2	Delaware	222 (7)
3	Villanova	194
4	Richmond	169 (2)
5	New Hampshire	135
6	Rhode Island	121
7	Towson	115
8	Albany	114
9	Maine	99
10	Stony Brook	73
11	William & Mary	61
12	Elon	50

=== Preseason All-CAA team ===
Graduate student tight end John Fitzgerald, senior offensive lineman Clayton McConnell, senior defensive lineman Kobie Turner, graduate student linebacker Tyler Dressler, and sophomore linebacker Tristan Wheeler were named to the CAA preseason all-conference team. Junior kick returner Aaron Dykes was named honorable mention for the all-conference team.

== Schedule ==
Date	Time	Opponent	Rank	Site	TV	Result	Attendance
September 4	2:00 p.m.	Howard*		E. Claiborne Robins Stadium; Richmond, VA	FloSports/NBCS WA	W 38–14	7,048
September 11	2:00 p.m.	Lehigh*	No. 25	E. Claiborne Robins Stadium; Richmond, VA	FloSports/NBCS WA	W 31–3	6,003
September 18	3:30 p.m.	at No. 12 Villanova	No. 21	Villanova Stadium; Villanova, PA	FloSports	L 27–34	12,001
September 25	12:00 p.m.	at Virginia Tech*	No. 24	Lane Stadium; Blacksburg, VA	ACCN	L 10–21	53,174
October 2	2:00 p.m.	Elon	No. 22	E. Claiborne Robins Stadium; Richmond, VA	FloSports/NBCS WA	L 7–20	8,217
October 16	2:00 p.m.	No. 8 James Madison		E. Claiborne Robins Stadium; Richmond, VA (rivalry)	FloSports/NBCS WA	L 3–19	7,809
October 23	3:30 p.m.	at Stony Brook		Kenneth P. LaValle Stadium; Stony Brook, NY	FloSports	L 14–27	10,250
October 30	1:00 p.m.	at New Hampshire		Wildcat Stadium; Durham, NH	FloSports	W 35–21	6,341
November 6	2:00 p.m.	Towson^{†}		E. Claiborne Robins Stadium; Richmond, VA	FloSports/NBCS WA	W 28–17	6,457
November 13	2:00 p.m.	Delaware		E. Claiborne Robins Stadium; Richmond, VA	FloSports/NBCS WA	W 51–27	6,104
November 20	3:30 p.m.	at William & Mary		Zable Stadium; Williamsburg, VA (Capital Cup)	FloSports	W 20–17	7,125
*Non-conference game; ^{†}Homecoming; Rankings from STATS Poll released prior to the game; All times are in Eastern time

== Ranking movements ==
Ranking movements Legend: ██ Increase in ranking ██ Decrease in ranking — = Not ranked RV = Received votes
	Week													
Poll	Pre	1	2	3	4	5	6	7	8	9	10	11	12	Final
STATS FCS	RV	25	21	24	22	—	—	—	—	—	—	—	RV	—
Coaches	22	22	18	21	21	RV	—	—	—	—	—	—	—	—
