= 2021 Rhode Island Rams football team =

American college football season

2021 Rhode Island Rams football
- Conference: Colonial Athletic Association
- Record: 7–4 (4–4 CAA)
- Head coach: Jim Fleming (8th season)
- Offensive coordinator: Patrick Murphy (2nd season)
- Defensive coordinator: Jack Cooper (2nd season)
- Home stadium: Meade Stadium

2021 Colonial Athletic Association football standings
	Conf.			Overall
Team	W		L	W		L
No. 3 James Madison +^	7	–	1	12	–	2
No. 8 Villanova +^	7	–	1	10	–	3
Elon	5	–	3	6	–	5
Rhode Island	4	–	4	7	–	4
Maine	4	–	4	6	–	5
Richmond	4	–	4	6	–	5
William & Mary	4	–	4	6	–	5
Stony Brook	4	–	4	5	–	6
Delaware	3	–	5	5	–	6
Towson	3	–	5	4	–	7
New Hampshire	2	–	6	3	–	8
Albany	1	–	7	2	–	9
+ – Conference co-champions; ^ – FCS playoff participant; Rankings from STATS Poll

The 2021 Rhode Island Rams football team represented the University of Rhode Island as a member of the Colonial Athletic Association (CAA) in the 2021 NCAA Division I FCS football season. The Rams, led by eighth-year head coach Jim Fleming, played their home games at Meade Stadium.

On October 11, the Rams were named 12th in national FCS polls, the highest they have been ranked in 20 years. Andre Bibeault was named the Special Teams Player of the Week by the CAA.

== Schedule ==
Date	Time	Opponent	Rank	Site	TV	Result	Attendance
September 4	6:00 p.m.	Bryant*		Meade Stadium; Kingston, RI	FloFootball	W 45–21	5,735
September 11	7:00 p.m.	at Albany		Bob Ford Field at Tom & Mary Casey Stadium; Albany, NY	FloFootball	W 16–14	8,144
September 18	12:30 p.m.	at Brown*		Richard Gouse Field at Brown Stadium; Providence, RI (rivalry)	ESPN+	W 45–24	5,243
October 2	12:00 p.m.	Stony Brook	No. 21	Meade Stadium; Kingston, RI	FloFootball	W 27–20 ^{OT}	5,778
October 9	1:00 p.m.	No. 9 Delaware	No. 18	Meade Stadium; Kingston, RI	FloFootball	W 22–15	4,917
October 16	4:00 p.m.	at Towson	No. 12	Johnny Unitas Stadium; Towson, MD	FloFootball	L 7–28	3,375
October 23	3:30 p.m.	at No. 5 Villanova	No. 18	Villanova Stadium; Villanova, PA	FloFootball	L 0–44	7,341
October 30	1:00 p.m.	Maine	No. 24	Meade Stadium; Kingston, RI	FloFootball	L 24–45	3,368
November 6	3:30 p.m.	at UMass*		Warren McGuirk Alumni Stadium; Hadley, MA	FloFootball/NESN	W 35–22	7,284
November 13	1:00 p.m.	New Hampshire		Meade Stadium; Kingston, RI	FloFootball	W 28–3	4,661
November 20	2:00 p.m.	at Elon	No. 25	Rhodes Stadium; Elon, NC	FloFootball	L 28–43	5,672
*Non-conference game; Rankings from STATS Poll released prior to the game; All times are in Eastern time

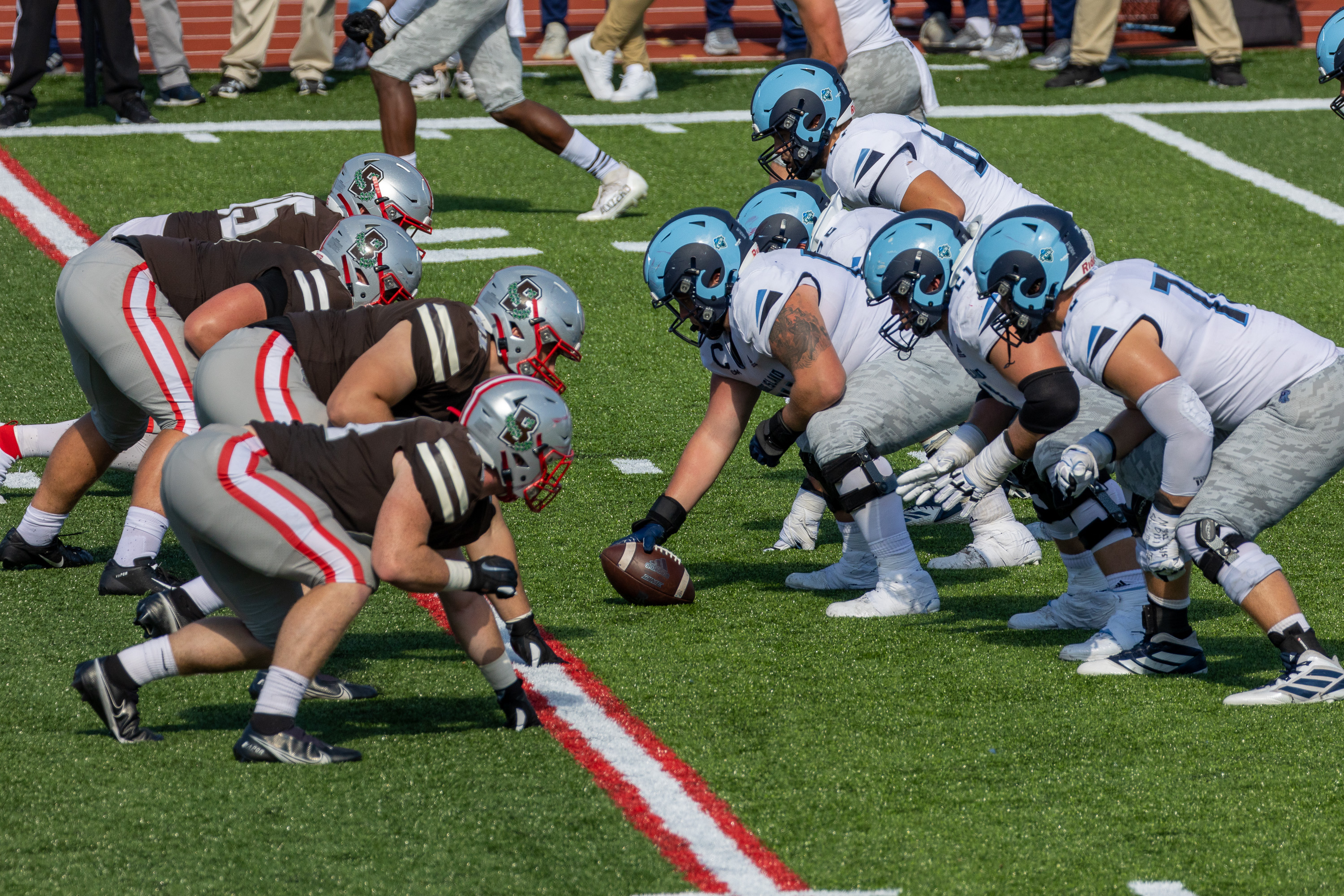
Rams defeated the Brown Bears, 45-24.

== Game summaries ==
=== Bryant ===
Game One – Rhode Island Rams (0–0) vs Bryant Bulldogs (0–0)

Quarter	1	2	3	4	Total
Bryant	7	7	7	0	21
Rhode Island	7	24	7	7	45

at Meade Stadium • Kingston, Rhode Island

- Date: Saturday, September 4, 2021
- Game time: 6:00 p.m. EST
- Game attendance: 5,735
- TV: FloSports

Game information

First quarter

- (11:03) URI – Justice Antrum 1 Yd Run, C.J. Carrick Kick (Rhode Island 7–0)
- (1:25) BRY – Daniel Adeboboye 1 Yd Run, Luke Samperi Kick (Tied 7–7)

Second quarter

- (8:48) URI – C.J. Carrick 33 Yd Field Goal (Rhode Island 10–7)
- (6:58) URI – Ivory Frimpong 17 Yd Pass, C.J. Carrick Kick (Rhode Island 17–7)
- (5:04) BRY – Landon Ruggieri 6 Yd Pass, Luke Samperi Kick (Rhode Island 17-14)
- (3:21) URI – Matt Pires 38 Yd Pass, C.J. Carrick Kick (Rhode Island 24–14)
- (0:32) URI – Justice Antrum 10 Yd Run, C.J. Carrick Kick (Rhode Island 31–14)

Third quarter

- (7:52) URI – Kasim Hill 1 Yd Run, C.J. Carrick Kick (Rhode Island 38–14)
- (1:22) BRY – Fabrice Mukendi 14 Yd Run, C.J. Carrick Kick (Rhode Island 38–21)

Fourth quarter

- (7:26) URI – Joey Kenny 20 Yd Pass, C.J. Carrick Kick (Rhode Island 45–21)

Statistics	BRY	URI
First downs	19	26
Plays–yards	63-262	68
Rushes–yards	115	235
Passing yards	147	273
Passing: comp–att–int	18-32-1	15-23-0
Time of possession	29:01	30:59

Team	Category	Player	Statistics
Bryant	Passing	Zevi Eckhaus	9/17, 55 yards
Bryant	Rushing	Daniel Adeboboye	17 carries, 68 yards, 1 TD
Bryant	Receiving	Gary Cooper	3 receptions, 39 yards
Rhode Island	Passing	Kasim Hill	12/18, 249 yards, 2 TD
Rhode Island	Rushing	Justice Antrum	18 carry, 96 yards, 2 TD
Rhode Island	Receiving	Paul Woods	2 receptions, 73 yards

=== At Albany ===
Game Two – Rhode Island Rams (1–0) vs Albany Great Danes (0–1)

Quarter	1	2	3	4	Total
Rhode Island	6	7	0	3	16
Albany	7	0	7	0	14

at Tom & Mary Casey Stadium • Albany, New York

- Date: Saturday, September 11, 2021
- Game time: 7:00 p.m. EST
- Game attendance: 8,144
- TV: FloSports

Game information

First quarter

- (10:14) ALB – Mike Gray 7 Yd Pass, Dylan Burns Kick (Albany 7–0)
- (6:35) URI – Justice Antrum 1 Yd Run, C.J. Carrick PAT Blocked (Albany 7–6)

Second quarter

- (14:05) URI – Coby Tippett 50 Yd Punt Return, C.J. Carrick Kick (Rhode Island 7–13)

Third quarter

- (3:36) ALB – Karl Mofor 2 Yd Run, Dylan Burns Kick (Albany 14–13)

Fourth quarter

- (13:25) URI – C.J. Carrick 22 YD Field Goal (Rhode Island 14–16)

Statistics	URI	ALB
First downs	16	16
Plays–yards	61-288	74-215
Rushes–yards	141	49
Passing yards	147	166
Passing: comp–att–int	15-30-1	19-36-1
Time of possession	26:39	33:21

Team	Category	Player	Statistics
Rhode Island	Passing	Kasim Hill	15/29, 147 yards, 1 INT
Rhode Island	Rushing	Justice Antrum	14 carries, 84 yards, 1 TD
Rhode Island	Receiving	Ivory Frimpong	8 receptions, 94 yards
Albany	Passing	Jeff Undercuffler Jr.	19/25, 166 yards, 1 TD
Albany	Rushing	Karl Mofor	26 carries, 75 yards, 1 TD
Albany	Receiving	Roy Alexander	4 receptions, 54 yards

=== At Brown ===
Game Three – Rhode Island Rams (2–0) vs Brown Bears (1–1)

Quarter	1	2	3	4	Total
Rhode Island	17	0	21	7	45
Brown	7	7	0	10	24

at Brown Stadium • Providence, Rhode Island

- Date: Saturday, September 18, 2021
- Game time: 12:30 p.m. EST
- Game attendance: 5,243
- TV: ESPN+

Game information

First quarter

- (9:10) BRWN – Hayes Sutton 14 Yd Pass, Christopher Maron Kick (Brown 7–0)
- (7:10) URI – Justice Antrum 35 Yd Pass, C.J. Carrick Kick (Tied 7–7)
- (4:58) URI – C.J. Carrick 33 Yd Field Goal (Rhode Island 7–10)
- (1:27) URI – Kasim Hill 1 Yd Run, C.J. Carrick Kick (Rhode Island 7–17)

Second quarter

- (4:04) BRWN – Allen Smith 3 Yd Run, Christopher Maron Kick (Rhode Island 14–17)

Third quarter

- (11:33) URI – Caleb Warren 7 Yd Pass, C.J. Carrick Kick (Rhode Island 14–24)
- (5:57) URI – Justice Antrum 1 Yd Run, C.J. Carrick Kick (Rhode Island 14–31)
- (5:57) URI – Matt Pires 80 Yd Pass, C.J. Carrick Kick (Rhode Island 14–38)

Fourth quarter

- (10:03) BRWN – Christopher Maron 16 Yd Field Goal (Rhode Island 17–38)
- (3:57) URI – Jordan Jones 0 Yd Interception Return, C.J. Carrick Kick (Rhode Island 17–45)
- (1:35) BRWN – Wes Rockett 6 Yd Pass, Christopher Maron Kick (Rhode Island 24–45)

Statistics	URI	BRWN
First downs	17	30
Plays–yards	55-435	100-535
Rushes–yards	111	190
Passing yards	324	345
Passing: comp–att–int	14-23-0	38-62-2
Time of possession	23:46	36:14

Team	Category	Player	Statistics
Rhode Island	Passing	Kasim Hill	13/19, 320 yards, 3 TD
Rhode Island	Rushing	Justice Antrum	13 carries, 47 yards, 1 TD
Rhode Island	Receiving	Caleb Warren	5 receptions, 105 yards, 1 TD
Brown	Passing	E.J. Perry	38/62, 345 yards, 2 TD, 2 INT
Brown	Rushing	Allen Smith	15 carries, 65 yards, 1 TD
Brown	Receiving	Hayes Sutton	7 receptions, 78 yards, 1 TD

=== Stony Brook ===
Game Four – No. 21 Rhode Island Rams (3–0) vs Stony Brook Seawolves (1–3)

Quarter	1	2	3	4	OT	Total
Stony Brook	7	0	6	7	0	20
Rhode Island	0	10	3	7	7	27

at Meade Stadium • Kingston, Rhode Island

- Date: Saturday, October 2, 2021
- Game time: 12:00 p.m. EST
- Game attendance: 5,778
- TV: FloSports

Game information

First quarter

- (4:10) STBK – Ty Son Lawton 30 Yd Run, Angelo Guglielmello Kick (Stony Brook 7–0)

Second quarter

- (4:53) URI – Justice Antrum 10 Yd Run, C.J. Carrick Kick (Tied 7–7)
- (0:15) URI – C.J. Carrick 42 Yd Field Goal (Rhode Island 7–10)

Third quarter

- (9:48) STBK – Tyquell Fields 9 Yd Run, Angelo Guglielmello PAT Failed (Stony Brook 13–10)
- (4:59) URI – C.J. Carrick 38 Yd Field Goal (Tied 13–13)

Fourth quarter

- (11:58) URI – Kasim Hill 8 Yd Run, C.J. Carrick Kick (Rhode Island 13–20)
- (7:40) STBK – Tyquell Fields 8 Yd Run, Mike Boyle Kick (Tied 20–20)

Overtime

- URI – Caleb Warren 27 Yd Pass, C.J. Carrick Kick (Rhode Island 20–27)

Statistics	STBK	URI
First downs	17	22
Plays–yards	62-293	79-414
Rushes–yards	192	188
Passing yards	101	226
Passing: comp–att–int	9-19-1	21-37-0
Time of possession	27:58	32:02

Team	Category	Player	Statistics
Stony Brook	Passing	Tyquell Fields	9/19, 101 yards, 1 INT
Stony Brook	Rushing	Ty Son Lawton	28 carries, 154 yards, 1 TD
Stony Brook	Receiving	Delante Hellams Jr.	4 receptions, 66 yards
Rhode Island	Passing	Kasim Hill	21/37, 226 yards, 1 TD
Rhode Island	Rushing	Justice Antrum	25 carries, 104 yards, 1 TD
Rhode Island	Receiving	Ivory Frimpong	6 receptions, 87 yards

=== No. 9 Delaware ===
Game Five – No. 18 Rhode Island Rams (4–0) vs No. 9 Delaware Fightin' Blue Hens (3–1)

Quarter	1	2	3	4	Total
Delaware	0	0	7	8	15
Rhode Island	3	9	0	10	22

at Meade Stadium • Kingston, Rhode Island

- Date: Saturday, October 9, 2021
- Game time: 1:00 p.m. EST
- Game attendance: 4,917
- TV: FloSports

Game information

First quarter

- (9:19) URI – C.J. Carrick 22 Yd Field Goal (Rhode Island 3–0)

Second quarter

- (1:01) URI – Kasim Hill 1 Yd Run, C.J. Carrick PAT Failed (Rhode Island 9–0)
- (0:05) URI – C.J. Carrick 25 Yd Field Goal (Rhode Island 12–0)

Third quarter

- (8:24) DEL – Thyrick Pitts 42 Yd Pass, Ryan Coe Kick (Rhode Island 12–7)

Fourth quarter

- (10:37) DEL – Quincy Watson 8 Yd Run, Quincy Watson Run for Two-Point Conversion (Delaware 12-15)
- (6:39) URI – C.J. Carrick 32 Yd Field Goal (Tied 12–12)
- (3:46) URI – L.B. Mack III 28 Yd Return of Blocked Punt, C.J. Carrick Kick (Rhode Island 22–15)

Statistics	DEL	URI
First downs	18	20
Plays–yards	63-303	71-340
Rushes–yards	186	185
Passing yards	117	155
Passing: comp–att–int	9-18-3	13-22-1
Time of possession	29:22	30:38

Team	Category	Player	Statistics
Delaware	Passing	Zach Gwynn	9/17, 117 yards, 1 TD, 3 INT
Delaware	Rushing	Dejoun Lee	19 carries, 115 yards
Delaware	Receiving	Thyrick Pitts	5 receptions, 61 yards, 1 TD
Rhode Island	Passing	Kasim Hill	13/22, 155 yards, 1 INT
Rhode Island	Rushing	Justice Antrum	30 carries, 122 yards
Rhode Island	Receiving	Caleb Warren	4 receptions, 88 yards

=== At Towson ===
Game Six – No. 12 Rhode Island Rams (5–0) vs Towson Tigers (2–3)

Quarter	1	2	3	4	Total
Rhode Island	7	0	0	0	7
Towson	14	0	7	7	28

at Johnny Unitas Stadium • Towson, Maryland

- Date: Saturday, October 16, 2021
- Game time: 4:00 p.m. EST
- Game attendance: 3,375
- TV: FloSports

Game information

First quarter

- (10:39) TOW – Devin Matthews 1 Yd Run, Keegan Vaughan Kick (Towson 7–0)
- (3:54) TOW – Devin Matthews 3 Yd Run, Keegan Vaughan Kick (Towson 14–0)
- (0:21) URI – Justice Antrum 18 Yd Run, C.J. Carrick Kick (Towson 14–7)

Second quarter

no scoring

Third quarter

- (2:04) TOW – Jabari Allen 5 Yd Pass, Keegan Vaughan Kick (Towson 21–7)

Fourth quarter

- (2:50) TOW – Jerry Howard Jr. 1 Yd Run, Keegan Vaughan Kick (Towson 28–7)

Statistics	URI	TOW
First downs	15	19
Plays–yards	59-162	73-338
Rushes–yards	72	147
Passing yards	90	191
Passing: comp–att–int	7-26-1	16-25-0
Time of possession	22:30	37:30

Team	Category	Player	Statistics
Rhode Island	Passing	Kasim Hill	7/26, 90 yards, 1 INT
Rhode Island	Rushing	Justice Antrum	15 carries, 62 yards, 1 TD
Rhode Island	Receiving	Caleb Warren	1 reception, 25 yards
Towson	Passing	Chris Ferguson	16/25, 191 yards, 1 TD
Towson	Rushing	Jerry Howard Jr.	27 carries, 106 yards, 1 TD
Towson	Receiving	Caleb Smith	4 receptions, 57 yards

=== At No. 5 Villanova ===
Game Seven – No. 18 Rhode Island Rams (5–1) vs No. 5 Villanova Wildcats (5–1)

Quarter	1	2	3	4	Total
Rhode Island	0	0	0	0	0
Villanova	14	10	7	13	44

at Villanova Stadium • Philadelphia, Pennsylvania

- Date: Saturday, October 23, 2021
- Game time: 3:30 p.m. EST
- Game attendance: 7,341
- TV: FloSports

Game information

First quarter

- (10:17) VILL – Jalen Jackson 3 Yd Run, Cole Bunce Kick (Villanova 7–0)
- (0:22) VILL – Todd Summers 3 Yd Pass, Cole Bunce Kick (Villanova 14–0)

Second quarter

- (9:02) VILL – Rayjoun Pringle 23 Yd Pass, Cole Bunce Kick (Villanova 21–0)
- (0:26) VILL – Cole Bunce 41 Yd Field Goal (Villanova 24–0)

Third quarter

- (4:23) VILL – Jalen Jackson 20 Yd Run, Cole Bunce Kick (Villanova 31–0)

Fourth quarter

- (14:52) VILL – Cole Bunce 36 Yd Field Goal (Villanova 34–0)
- (9:27) VILL – TD Ayo-Durojaiye 8 Yd Run, Cole Bunce Kick (Villanova 41–0)
- (6:41) VILL – Cole Bunce 43 Yd Field Goal (Villanova 44–0)

Statistics	URI	VILL
First downs	9	24
Plays–yards	57-165	70-511
Rushes–yards	107	297
Passing yards	58	214
Passing: comp–att–int	10-23-1	14-25-0
Time of possession	24:49	35:11

Team	Category	Player	Statistics
Rhode Island	Passing	Brandon Robinson	6/10, 36 yards
Rhode Island	Rushing	Justice Antrum	9 carries, 60 yards
Rhode Island	Receiving	Ed Lee	2 receptions, 14 yards
Villanova	Passing	Daniel Smith	14/24, 214 yards, 2 TD
Villanova	Rushing	Jalen Jackson	12 carries, 104 yards, 2 TD
Villanova	Receiving	Rayjoun Pringle	3 receptions, 91 yards, 1 TD

=== Maine ===
Game Eight – No. 24 Rhode Island Rams (5–2) vs Maine Black Bears (3–4)

Quarter	1	2	3	4	Total
Maine	14	10	7	14	45
Rhode Island	3	0	14	7	24

at Meade Stadium • Kingston, Rhode Island

- Date: Saturday, October 30, 2021
- Game time: 1:00 p.m. EST
- Game attendance: 3,368
- TV: FloSports

Game information

First quarter

- (10:20) ME – Zavier Scott 1 Yd Run, Cole Baker Kick (Maine 7–0)
- (5:24) ME – Devin Young 31 Yd Pass, Cole Baker Kick (Maine 14–0)
- (1:48) URI – C.J. Carrick 39 Yd Field Goal (Maine 14–3)

Second quarter

- (13:24) ME – Andre Miller 22 Yd Pass, Cole Baker Kick (Maine 21–3)
- (0:00) ME – Cole Baker 24 Yd Field Goal (Maine 24–3)

Third quarter

- (14:41) URI – Paul Woods 68 Yd Pass, C.J. Carrick Kick (Maine 24–10)
- (9:40) URI – Jaylen Smith 3 Yd Pass, C.J. Carrick Kick (Maine 24–17)
- (2:02) ME – Daniel Rymer 28 Yd Pass, Cole Baker Kick (Maine 31–17)

Fourth quarter

- (14:18) URI – Caleb Warren 5 Yd Pass, C.J. Carrick Kick (Maine 31–24)
- (7:01) ME – Shawn Bowman 13 Yd Pass, Cole Baker Kick (Maine 38–24)
- (4:58) ME – Freddie Brock 18 Yd Run, Cole Baker Kick (Maine 45–24)

Statistics	ME	URI
First downs	27	10
Plays–yards	81-528	51-298
Rushes–yards	264	68
Passing yards	264	230
Passing: comp–att–int	18-37-1	16-29-0
Time of possession	36:59	23:01

Team	Category	Player	Statistics
Maine	Passing	Derek Robertson	18/37, 264 yards, 4 TD, 1 INT
Maine	Rushing	Freddie Brock	20 carries, 140 yards, 1 TD
Maine	Receiving	Andre Miller	4 receptions, 90 yards, 1 TD
Rhode Island	Passing	Kasim Hill	11/22, 177 yards, 3 TD
Rhode Island	Rushing	Jaylen Smith	11 carries, 46 yards
Rhode Island	Receiving	Paul Woods	4 receptions, 102 yards, 1 TD

=== At UMass ===
Game Nine – Rhode Island Rams (5–3) vs UMass Minutemen (1-7)

Quarter	1	2	3	4	Total
Rhode Island	7	14	14	0	35
UMass	6	10	0	6	22

at Warren McGuirk Alumni Stadium • Amherst, Massachusetts

- Date: Saturday, November 6, 2021
- Game time: 3:30 p.m. EST
- Game attendance: 7,284
- TV: FloSports/NESN

Game information

First quarter

- (11:58) URI – Kasim Hill 2 Yd Run, C.J. Carrick Kick (Rhode Island 7–0)
- (6:06) MASS – Tyler Lytle 3 Yd Run, Cameron Carson PAT failed (Rhode Island 7–6)

Second quarter

- (12:49) MASS – Cameron Carson 39 Yd Field Goal (UMass 7–9)
- (9:33) URI – Ed Lee 5 Yd Pass, C.J. Carrick Kick (Rhode Island 14–9)
- (2:45) URI – Joey Kenny 3 Yd Pass, C.J. Carrick Kick (Rhode Island 21–9)
- (0:12) MASS – Josiah Johnson 3 Yd Pass, Cameron Carson Kick (Rhode Island 21–16)

Third quarter

- (2:50) URI – Kasim Hill 2 Yd Run, C.J. Carrick Kick (Rhode Island 28–16)
- (0:13) URI – Jaylen Smith 72 Yd Run, C.J. Carrick Kick (Rhode Island 35–16)

Fourth quarter

- (8:50) MASS – Ellis Merriweather 1 Yd Run, Two-Point Pass Conversion Failed (Rhode Island 35–22)

Statistics	URI	MASS
First downs	16	21
Plays–yards	56-337	64-335
Rushes–yards	168	108
Passing yards	169	227
Passing: comp–att–int	11-20-0	15-28-1
Time of possession	30:38	29:22

Team	Category	Player	Statistics
Rhode Island	Passing	Kasim Hill	11/20, 169 yards, 2 TD
Rhode Island	Rushing	Jaylen Smith	16 carries, 111 yards, 1 TD
Rhode Island	Receiving	Paul Woods	3 receptions, 55 yards
UMass	Passing	Tyler Lytle	15/28, 227 yards, 1 TD, 1 INT
UMass	Rushing	Ellis Merriweather	30 carries, 118 yards, 1 TD
UMass	Receiving	Rico Arnold	6 receptions, 99 yards

=== New Hampshire ===
Game Ten – Rhode Island Rams (6–3) vs New Hampshire Wildcats (3–6)

Quarter	1	2	3	4	Total
New Hampshire	3	0	0	0	3
Rhode Island	7	7	7	7	28

at Meade Stadium • Kingston, Rhode Island

- Date: Saturday, November 13, 2021
- Game time: 1:00 p.m. EST
- Game attendance: 4,661
- TV: FloSports

Game information

First quarter

- (14:07) URI – Jaylen Smith 81 Yd Pass, C.J. Carrick Kick (Rhode Island 7–0)
- (4:52) UNH – Sean Lehane 21 Yd Field Goal (Rhode Island 7–3)

Second quarter

- (1:38) URI – Matt Pires 6 Yd Pass, C.J. Carrick Kick (Rhode Island 14–3)

Third quarter

- (10:06) URI – Jaylen Smith 2 Yd Pass, C.J. Carrick Kick (Rhode Island 21–3)

Fourth quarter

- (5:41) URI – Ivory Frimpong 20 Yd Pass, C.J. Carrick Kick (Rhode Island 28–3)

Statistics	UNH	URI
First downs	10	20
Plays–yards	56-159	68-379
Rushes–yards	24	150
Passing yards	135	229
Passing: comp–att–int	15-31-1	13-24-0
Time of possession	27:42	32:18

Team	Category	Player	Statistics
New Hampshire	Passing	Bret Edwards	10/16, 85 yards
New Hampshire	Rushing	Dylan Laube	8 carries, 23 yards
New Hampshire	Receiving	Brian Espanet	6 receptions, 69 yards
Rhode Island	Passing	Kasim Hill	12/23, 221 yards, 4 TD
Rhode Island	Rushing	Jaylen Smith	18 carries, 117 yards
Rhode Island	Receiving	Jaylen Smith	3 receptions, 88 yards, 2 TD

=== At Elon ===
Game Eleven – No. 25 Rhode Island Rams (7–3) vs Elon Phoenix (5-5)

Quarter	1	2	3	4	Total
Rhode Island	7	3	7	11	28
Elon	14	13	3	13	43

at Rhodes Stadium • Elon, North Carolina

- Date: Saturday, November 20, 2021
- Game time: 2:00 p.m. EST
- Game attendance: 14,000
- TV: FloSports

Game information

First quarter

- (12:11) URI – Matt Pires 27 Yd Pass, C.J. Carrick Kick (Rhode Island 7–0)
- (8:33) ELON – Kortez Weeks 5 Yd Pass, Skyler Davis Kick (Tied 7–7)
- (2:15) ELON – Jaylan Thomas 15 Yd Run, Skyler Davis Kick (Elon 7–14)

Second quarter

- (13:08) ELON – Skyler Davis 44 Yd Field Goal (Elon 7–17)
- (10:21) ELON – Dylan Tucker 43 Yd Fumble Return, Skyler Davis Kick (Elon 7–24)
- (4:32) ELON – Skyler Davis 32 Yd Field Goal (Elon 7–27)
- (0:34) URI – C.J. Carrick 43 Yd Field Goal (Elon 10–27)

Third quarter

- (9:34) ELON – Skyler Davis 36 Yd Field Goal (Elon 10–30)
- (5:47) URI – Matt Pires 25 Yd Pass, C.J. Carrick Kick (Elon 17–30)

Fourth quarter

- (13:35) ELON – Skyler Davis 43 Yd Field Goal (Elon 17–33)
- (8:13) ELON – Skyler Davis 46 Yd Field Goal (Elon 17–36)
- (5:54) URI – Ed Lee 16 Yd Pass, Matt Pires Run for Two-Point Conversion (Elon 25–36)
- (5:00) URI – C.J. Carrick 36 Yd Field Goal (Elon 28–36)
- (2:35) ELON – Jaylan Thomas 19 Yd Run, Skyler Davis Kick (Elon 28–43)

Statistics	URI	ELON
First downs	24	20
Plays–yards	77-447	65
Rushes–yards	53	148
Passing yards	394	284
Passing: comp–att–int	31-56-2	23-32-0
Time of possession	28:04	31:56

Team	Category	Player	Statistics
Rhode Island	Passing	Kasim Hill	31/55, 394 yards, 3 TD, 2 INT
Rhode Island	Rushing	Jaylen Smith	9 carries, 36 yards
Rhode Island	Receiving	Matt Pires	8 receptions, 138 yards, 2 TD
Elon	Passing	Davis Cheek	23/32, 284 yards, 1 TD
Elon	Rushing	Jaylan Thomas	22 carries, 135 yards, 2 TD
Elon	Receiving	Jackson Parham	6 receptions, 91 yards

== Ranking ==
Ranking movements Legend: ██ Increase in ranking ██ Decrease in ranking — = Not ranked
	Week													
Poll	Pre	1	2	3	4	5	6	7	8	9	10	11	12	Final
STATS FCS	—	—	—	21	18	12	18	24	—	—	—	25	—	—
Coaches	—	—	—	—	24	20	14	19	25	—	—	—	—	—

== Personnel ==
=== Coaching staff ===
Name	Position
Jim Fleming	Head coach
Jack Cooper	Defensive coordinator/defensive back coach
Umberto Di Meo	Defensive line coach
Mike Flanagan	Associate head coach/Running backs coach/Recruiting coordinator
Connor Floden	Offensive quality control coach
Troy Gilmer	Outside linebackers coach/special teams coordinator
Tyler Loftus	Tight ends coach
Chris Lorenti	Inside linebackers coach
Clayton McGrath	Defensive quality control coach
Patrick Murphy	Offensive coordinator/quarterbacks coach
Chris Satoh	Assistant defensive backs coach/director of video & social media
Donovan Varner	Wide receivers coach/pro liaison
Stefon Wheeler	Offensive line coach
Matt Boyle	Director of football operations
Donnie Smith	Director of player development
Robert Izzi	Team chaplain

=== Roster ===
2022 Rhode Island Rams Football
Quarterbacks: 2 - Brandon Robinson – (redshirt) sophomore (6'4, 215); 8 - Kasim Hill – (redshirt) junior (6'2, 234); 13 - Nick Dionizio – (redshirt) sophomore (6'2, 185); 15 - Jackson Burkhalter – freshman (6'5, 225); Running backs: 4 - Ty Murphy – (redshirt) freshman (5'10, 215); 5 - Kevin Brown, Jr. – (redshirt) freshman (6'0, 215); 27 - Jaylen Smith – freshman (5'10, 205); 30 - Joey Kenny – (redshirt) senior (6'2, 253); 32 - Justice Antrum – senior (5'9, 190); 34 - Gabe Sloat – (redshirt) freshman (6'0, 185); 41 - Rocco Cillino – freshman (5'9, 185); Wide receivers: 3 - John Erby – (redshirt) sophomore (5'10, 185); 9 - Jig Williams – freshman (6'3, 185); 10 - Paul Woods – (redshirt) junior (6'3, 163); 11 - Jeremiah Fails – (redshirt) freshman (5'11, 195); 14 - Jelani Foster – (redshirt) freshman (6'1, 200); 17 - Jamall Mensah – freshman (5'11, 180); 19 - Matt Pires – senior (5'11, 185); 36 - J.T. Gibbons – junior (6'0, 225); 80 - Ed Lee – (redshirt) junior (5'9, 185); 83 - Justin Neary – (redshirt) sophomore (5'10, 170); 84 - Ivory Frimpong – senior (6'3, 195); 85 - Chris Thompson – freshman (5'10, 180); 86 - Robenson Antoine, Jr. – (redshirt) freshman (5'7, 150); 88 - Teddy Harper – (redshirt) freshman (5'9, 180)	Tight ends: 81 - Tommy Smith – (redshirt) freshman (6'2, 200); 82 - Caleb Warren – junior (6'3, 235); 87 - Trent LeDuc – freshman (6'4, 230); 89 - Brady Roark – (redshirt) freshman (6'2, 235); Offensive linemen: 61 - Evan Lovell – (redshirt) sophomore (6'4, 305); 62 - Richard King – freshman (6'3, 283); 63 - Omar Reyes – freshman (6'0, 265); 64 - Sebastian Delasoudas – (redshirt) sophomore (6'2, 290); 65 - Ajani Cornelius – freshman (6'4, 320); 66 - Jaizon Soehl-Zelaya – (redshirt) sophomore (6'2, 300); 67 - Jordan Riendeau – (redshirt) freshman (6'5, 250); 68 - Kai Rose – freshman (6'3, 300); 70 - Adam McKanna – freshman (6'5, 290); 72 - Jacob Otts – freshman (6'7, 285); 75 - Nick Correia – (redshirt) sophomore (6'6, 330); 78 - Lorenzo Thompson – (redshirt) sophomore (6'7, 285); 79 - Montaner Fresilli – (redshirt) freshman (6'2, 290)	Defensive linemen: 44 - James Makszin – (redshirt) sophomore (6'3, 290); 51 - Andre Bibeault – (redshirt) senior (6'3, 255); 52 - Malachi Burby – (redshirt) freshman (6'3, 290); 54 - Dylan Brown – (redshirt) sophomore (6'3, 310); 55 - Matt Thomas – sophomore (6'3, 271); 56 - KC Aghanenu – freshman (6'1, 250); 69 - Matthew Osinaga – freshman (6'2, 250); 77 - Robert Sanfilippo – (redshirt) sophomore (6'1, 285); 90 - Ryan McDonough – (redshirt) sophomore (6'4, 250); 92 - Emil La Marca – (redshirt) junior (6'2, 275); 98 - Jasyn Andrews – junior (6'3, 275); 99 - Westley Neal, Jr. – freshman (6'0, 315); Linebackers: 6 - Evan Stewart – (redshirt) freshman (6'0, 225); 7 - L.B. Mack III – (redshirt) senior (6'2, 230); 22 - Sebastian Sagar – freshman (6'4, 215); 31 - Andre Johnson – (redshirt) sophomore (6'0, 205); 33 - Mekhi Bethel – freshman (6'1, 215); 35 - Johnny Alvarado – (redshirt) freshman (6'1, 230); 38 - Andre Blackett – senior (6'0, 235); 39 - Cole Brockwell – (redshirt) freshman (6'0, 210); 47 - Jarrett Martin – (redshirt) sophomore (6'3, 220); 48 - Christian Arrington – (redshirt) sophomore (6'2, 225); 53 - Gabe Salomons – freshman (6'4, 235); 57 - Michael Strachan – freshman (6'2, 220); 58 - Jake Fire – (redshirt) junior (5'11, 225); 59 - Zach Pinault – (redshirt) sophomore (5'11, 215)	Defensive backs: 8 - Antonio Carter II – (redshirt) freshman (6'1, 187); 15 - Oneil Robinson – junior (6'2, 195); 18 - Coby Tippett – senior (5'11, 195); 21 - Josh Doyle – freshman (5'10, 185); 23 - Jordan Jones – (redshirt) junior (6'0, 170); 24 - Arthur White – freshman (6'1, 180); 25 - Fredrick Mallay – freshman (5'9, 175); 26 - Malik Hill – freshman (6'0, 180); 29 - Henry Yianakopolos – (redshirt) junior (6'1, 200); 40 - Malik Gavek – (redshirt) junior (5'10, 185); 43 - Seun Filaoye – (redshirt) freshman (5'10, 165); 49 - Emmanuel Gomes – (redshirt) freshman (6'0, 185); Placekickers: 45 - C.J. Carrick – senior (6'2, 190); 96 - Michael DeBolt – freshman (5'11, 190); Punters: 37 - Davey Schaum-Bartocci – (redshirt) junior (6'0, 170); 94 - Henry Westermann – (redshirt) freshman (6'3, 195); Long snapper: 95 - Donato Crisanti – freshman (6'4, 226)
Source and player details, 2021 Rhode Island Rams (10/18/2022):
