= 2021 Elon Phoenix football team =

American college football season

2021 Elon Phoenix football
- Conference: Colonial Athletic Association
- Record: 6–5 (5–3 CAA)
- Head coach: Tony Trisciani (3rd season)
- Offensive coordinator: Drew Folmar (5th season)
- Defensive coordinator: Billy Crocker (3rd season)
- Home stadium: Rhodes Stadium

2021 Colonial Athletic Association football standings
	Conf.			Overall
Team	W		L	W		L
No. 3 James Madison +^	7	–	1	12	–	2
No. 8 Villanova +^	7	–	1	10	–	3
Elon	5	–	3	6	–	5
Rhode Island	4	–	4	7	–	4
Maine	4	–	4	6	–	5
Richmond	4	–	4	6	–	5
William & Mary	4	–	4	6	–	5
Stony Brook	4	–	4	5	–	6
Delaware	3	–	5	5	–	6
Towson	3	–	5	4	–	7
New Hampshire	2	–	6	3	–	8
Albany	1	–	7	2	–	9
+ – Conference co-champions; ^ – FCS playoff participant; Rankings from STATS Poll

The 2021 Elon Phoenix football team represented Elon University as a member of the Colonial Athletic Association (CAA) in the 2021 NCAA Division I FCS football season. The Phoenix, led by third-year head coach Tony Trisciani, played their home games at Rhodes Stadium.

== Schedule ==
Date	Time	Opponent	Site	TV	Result	Attendance
September 4	2:00 p.m.	Wofford*	Rhodes Stadium; Elon, NC	WMYV/FloSports	L 22–24	8,712
September 11	6:00 p.m.	at Campbell*	Barker–Lane Stadium; Buies Creek, NC	ESPN+	W 24–23	5,032
September 18	3:30 p.m.	at Appalachian State*	Kidd Brewer Stadium; Boone, NC	ESPN+	L 10–44	30,224
September 25	2:00 p.m.	William & Mary	Rhodes Stadium; Elon, NC	WMYV/FloSports	L 31–34	11,897
October 2	2:00 p.m.	at No. 22 Richmond	E. Claiborne Robins Stadium; Richmond, VA	NBCSW/FloSports	W 20–7	8,217
October 9	12:00 p.m.	at Maine	Alfond Stadium; Orono, ME	FloSports	W 33–23	4,174
October 23	2:00 p.m.	New Hampshire	Rhodes Stadium; Elon, NC	WMYV/FloSports	W 24–10	6,124
October 30	2:00 p.m.	at No. 5 James Madison	Bridgeforth Stadium; Harrisonburg, VA	NBCSW/FloSports	L 21–45	21,029
November 6	2:00 p.m.	No. 10 Villanova	Rhodes Stadium; Elon, NC	WMYV/FloSports	L 0–35	8,865
November 13	2:00 p.m.	at Towson	Johnny Unitas Stadium; Towson, MD	FloSports	W 37–14	4,040
November 20	2:00 p.m.	No. 25 Rhode Island	Rhodes Stadium; Elon, NC	WMYV/FloSports	W 43–28	5,672
*Non-conference game; Rankings from STATS Poll released prior to the game; All times are in Eastern time
