= 2021 Towson Tigers football team =

American college football season

2021 Towson Tigers football
- Conference: Colonial Athletic Association
- Record: 4–7 (3–5 CAA)
- Head coach: Rob Ambrose (12th season)
- Defensive coordinator: Eric Daniels (2nd season)
- Home stadium: Johnny Unitas Stadium

2021 Colonial Athletic Association football standings
	Conf.			Overall
Team	W		L	W		L
No. 3 James Madison +^	7	–	1	12	–	2
No. 8 Villanova +^	7	–	1	10	–	3
Elon	5	–	3	6	–	5
Rhode Island	4	–	4	7	–	4
Maine	4	–	4	6	–	5
Richmond	4	–	4	6	–	5
William & Mary	4	–	4	6	–	5
Stony Brook	4	–	4	5	–	6
Delaware	3	–	5	5	–	6
Towson	3	–	5	4	–	7
New Hampshire	2	–	6	3	–	8
Albany	1	–	7	2	–	9
+ – Conference co-champions; ^ – FCS playoff participant; Rankings from STATS Poll

The 2021 Towson Tigers football team represented Towson University in the 2021 NCAA Division I FCS football season. They were led by 12th-year head coach Rob Ambrose, and played their home games at Johnny Unitas Stadium in Towson, Maryland. They played as members of the Colonial Athletic Association (CAA).

== Schedule ==
Date	Time	Opponent	Rank	Site	TV	Result	Attendance
September 4	4:00 p.m.	at Morgan State*		Hughes Stadium; Baltimore, MD	ESPN+	W 31–0	8,035
September 11	6:00 p.m.	at New Hampshire		Wildcat Stadium; Durham, NH	FloFootball	L 14–26	10,247
September 18	6:00 p.m.	No. 5 North Dakota State*		Johnny Unitas Stadium; Towson, MD	FloFootball	L 7–35	9,109
September 25	3:30 p.m.	at San Diego State*		Dignity Health Sports Park; Carson, CA	Stadium	L 21–48	7,619
October 9	4:00 p.m.	Stony Brook		Johnny Unitas Stadium; Towson, MD	FloFootball	W 21–14	7,209
October 16	4:00 p.m.	No. 12 Rhode Island		Johnny Unitas Stadium; Towson, MD	FloFootball	W 28–7	3,375
October 23	3:30 p.m.	at William & Mary		Zable Stadium; Williamsburg, VA	FloFootball	L 14–40	5,635
October 30	2:00 p.m.	Albany		Johnny Unitas Stadium; Towson, MD	FloFootball	W 38–24	4,072
November 6	2:00 p.m.	at Richmond		E. Claiborne Robins Stadium; Richmond, VA	FloFootball	L 17–28	6,457
November 13	2:00 p.m.	Elon		Johnny Unitas Stadium; Towson, MD	FloFootball	L 14–37	4,040
November 20	2:00 p.m.	at No. 2 James Madison		Bridgeforth Stadium; Harrisonburg, VA	FloFootball	L 10–56	16,644
*Non-conference game; Rankings from STATS Poll released prior to the game; All times are in Eastern time
