= 2021 Albany Great Danes football team =

University of Rhode Island in the 2021 NCAA Division I FCS football season

2021 Albany Great Danes football
- Conference: Colonial Athletic Association
- Record: 2–9 (1–7 CAA)
- Head coach: Greg Gattuso (8th season)
- Offensive coordinator: Joe Davis (4th season)
- Defensive coordinator: Joe Bernard (4th season)
- Home stadium: Bob Ford Field at Tom & Mary Casey Stadium

2021 Colonial Athletic Association football standings
	Conf.			Overall
Team	W		L	W		L
No. 3 James Madison +^	7	–	1	12	–	2
No. 8 Villanova +^	7	–	1	10	–	3
Elon	5	–	3	6	–	5
Rhode Island	4	–	4	7	–	4
Maine	4	–	4	6	–	5
Richmond	4	–	4	6	–	5
William & Mary	4	–	4	6	–	5
Stony Brook	4	–	4	5	–	6
Delaware	3	–	5	5	–	6
Towson	3	–	5	4	–	7
New Hampshire	2	–	6	3	–	8
Albany	1	–	7	2	–	9
+ – Conference co-champions; ^ – FCS playoff participant; Rankings from STATS Poll

The 2021 Albany Great Danes football team represented the University at Albany, SUNY as a member of the Colonial Athletic Association (CAA) during the 2021 NCAA Division I FCS football season. Led by eighth-year head coach Greg Gattuso, the Great Danes compiled an overall record of 2–9 with a mark of 1–7 in conference play, placing last out of 12 teams in the CAA. The team played home games at Bob Ford Field at Tom & Mary Casey Stadium in Albany, New York.

== Schedule ==
Date	Time	Opponent	Site	TV	Result	Attendance
September 4	3:30 p.m.	at No. 4 North Dakota State*	Fargodome; Fargo, ND	ESPN+	L 6–28	15,156
September 11	7:00 p.m.	Rhode Island	Bob Ford Field at Tom & Mary Casey Stadium; Albany, NY	FloSports	L 14–16	8,144
September 18	12:00 p.m.	at Syracuse*	Carrier Dome; Syracuse, NY	ACCN	L 24–62	30,156
October 2	3:00 p.m.	at No. 9 Delaware	Delaware Stadium; Newark, DE	FloSports	L 15–20	18,080
October 9	3:30 p.m.	at William & Mary	Zable Stadium; Williamsburg, VA	YurView, FloSports	L 24–31	8,080
October 16	3:30 p.m.	No. 6 Villanova	Bob Ford Field at Tom & Mary Casey Stadium; Albany, NY	FloSports	L 10–17	7,121
October 23	1:00 p.m.	Maine	Bob Ford Field at Tom & Mary Casey Stadium; Albany, NY	FloSports	L 16–19	3,089
October 30	2:00 p.m.	at Towson	Johnny Unitas Stadium; Towson, MD	FloSports	L 24–38	4,072
November 6	1:00 p.m.	New Hampshire	Bob Ford Field at Tom & Mary Casey Stadium; Albany, NY	FloSports	W 20–7	2,988
November 13	1:00 p.m.	Morgan State*	Bob Ford Field at Tom & Mary Casey Stadium; Albany, NY	FloSports	W 41–14	2,077
November 20	1:00 p.m.	at Stony Brook	Kenneth P. LaValle Stadium; Stony Brook, NY (rivalry)	FloSports	L 14–36	6,101
*Non-conference game; Rankings from STATS Poll released prior to the game; All times are in Eastern time
