= 2021 Stony Brook Seawolves football team =

American college football season

2021 Stony Brook Seawolves football
- Conference: Colonial Athletic Association
- Record: 5–6 (4–4 CAA)
- Head coach: Chuck Priore (16th season)
- Co-offensive coordinator: Chris Bache (7th season)
- Defensive coordinator: Rob Noel (2nd season)
- Home stadium: Kenneth P. LaValle Stadium

2021 Colonial Athletic Association football standings
	Conf.			Overall
Team	W		L	W		L
No. 3 James Madison +^	7	–	1	12	–	2
No. 8 Villanova +^	7	–	1	10	–	3
Elon	5	–	3	6	–	5
Rhode Island	4	–	4	7	–	4
Maine	4	–	4	6	–	5
Richmond	4	–	4	6	–	5
William & Mary	4	–	4	6	–	5
Stony Brook	4	–	4	5	–	6
Delaware	3	–	5	5	–	6
Towson	3	–	5	4	–	7
New Hampshire	2	–	6	3	–	8
Albany	1	–	7	2	–	9
+ – Conference co-champions; ^ – FCS playoff participant; Rankings from STATS Poll

The 2021 Stony Brook Seawolves football team represented the Stony Brook University as a member of the Colonial Athletic Association (CAA) in the 2021 NCAA Division I FCS football season. The Seawolves, led by 16th-year head coach Chuck Priore, played their home games at Kenneth P. LaValle Stadium.

== Schedule ==
Date	Time	Opponent	Site	TV	Result	Attendance
September 2	6:00 p.m.	New Hampshire	Kenneth P. LaValle Stadium; Stony Brook, NY	FloFootball	L 21–27	6,177
September 11	1:00 p.m.	at Colgate*	Crown Field at Andy Kerr Stadium; Hamilton, NY	ESPN+	W 24–3	3,544
September 18	7:30 p.m.	at No. 4 (FBS) Oregon*	Autzen Stadium; Eugene, OR	P12N	L 7–48	42,782
September 25	3:30 p.m.	Fordham*	Kenneth P. LaValle Stadium; Stony Brook, NY	FloFootball	L 14–31	5,765
October 2	12:00 p.m.	at No. 21 Rhode Island	Meade Stadium; Kingston, RI	FloFootball	L 20–27 ^{OT}	5,778
October 9	4:00 p.m.	at Towson	Johnny Unitas Stadium; Towson, MD	FloFootball	L 14–21	7,209
October 16	3:30 p.m.	No. 14 Delaware	Kenneth P. LaValle Stadium; Stony Brook, NY	FloFootball	W 34–17	5,590
October 23	3:30 p.m.	Richmond	Kenneth P. LaValle Stadium; Stony Brook, NY	FloFootball	W 27–14	10,250
November 6	12:00 p.m.	at Maine	Alfond Stadium; Orono, ME	FloFootball	W 22–17	4,137
November 13	1:00 p.m.	at No. 8 Villanova	Villanova Stadium; Villanova, PA	FloFootball	L 14–33	4,421
November 20	1:00 p.m.	Albany	Kenneth P. LaValle Stadium; Stony Brook, NY	FloFootball	W 36–14	6,101
*Non-conference game; Rankings from STATS Poll released prior to the game; All times are in Eastern time
