= 2021 William & Mary Tribe football team =

American college football season

2021 William & Mary Tribe football
- Conference: Colonial Athletic Association
- Record: 6–5 (4–4 CAA)
- Head coach: Mike London (3rd season)
- Offensive coordinator: Christian Taylor (2nd season)
- Defensive coordinator: Vincent Brown (3rd season)
- Home stadium: Zable Stadium

2021 Colonial Athletic Association football standings
	Conf.			Overall
Team	W		L	W		L
No. 3 James Madison +^	7	–	1	12	–	2
No. 8 Villanova +^	7	–	1	10	–	3
Elon	5	–	3	6	–	5
Rhode Island	4	–	4	7	–	4
Maine	4	–	4	6	–	5
Richmond	4	–	4	6	–	5
William & Mary	4	–	4	6	–	5
Stony Brook	4	–	4	5	–	6
Delaware	3	–	5	5	–	6
Towson	3	–	5	4	–	7
New Hampshire	2	–	6	3	–	8
Albany	1	–	7	2	–	9
+ – Conference co-champions; ^ – FCS playoff participant; Rankings from STATS Poll

The 2021 William & Mary Tribe football team represented the College of William & Mary as a member of the Colonial Athletic Association (CAA) in the 2021 NCAA Division I FCS football season. The Tribe, led by third-year head coach Mike London, played their home games at Zable Stadium.

== Preseason ==
=== CAA poll ===
In the CAA preseason poll released on July 27, 2021, the Tribe were predicted to finish in 11th place.

Predicted finish	Team	Votes (1st place)
1	James Madison	231 (15)
2	Delaware	222 (7)
3	Villanova	194
4	Richmond	169 (2)
5	New Hampshire	135
6	Rhode Island	121
7	Towson	115
8	Albany	114
9	Maine	99
10	Stony Brook	73
11	William & Mary	61
12	Elon	50

=== Preseason All-CAA team ===
Punt returner Bronson Yoder was selected to the preseason All-CAA Team, while Andrew Trainer (offensive line) and Will Kiely (defensive line) were selected as preseason honorable mention picks.

== Schedule ==
Date	Time	Opponent	Rank	Site	TV	Result	Attendance
September 4	7:30 p.m.	at Virginia*		Scott Stadium; Charlottesville, VA	ACCRSN	L 0–43	42,982
September 11	6:00 p.m.	Lafayette*		Zable Stadium; Williamsburg, VA	FloFootball	W 24–3	6,162
September 18	1:00 p.m.	at Colgate*		Crown Field at Andy Kerr Stadium; Hamilton, NY	ESPN+	W 27–7	1,165
September 25	2:00 p.m.	at Elon		Rhodes Stadium; Elon, NC	FloFootball	W 34–31	11,897
October 9	3:30 p.m.	Albany^{†}		Zable Stadium; Williamsburg, VA	FloFootball	W 31–24	8,080
October 16	12:00 p.m.	at Maine		Alfond Stadium; Orono, ME	FloFootball	L 16–27	6,356
October 23	3:30 p.m.	Towson		Zable Stadium; Williamsburg, VA	FloFootball	W 40–14	5,635
October 30	1:00 p.m.	at No. 4 Villanova		Villanova Stadium; Villanova, PA	FloFootball	W 31–18	5,101
November 6	1:00 p.m.	at Delaware	No. 20 т	Delaware Stadium; Newark, DE (rivalry)	FloFootball	L 3–24	10,021
November 13	3:30 p.m.	No. 2 James Madison	No. 25	Zable Stadium; Williamsburg, VA (rivalry)	FloFootball	L 22–32	10,555
November 20	3:30 p.m.	Richmond		Zable Stadium; Williamsburg, VA (Capital Cup)	FloFootball	L 17–20	7,125
*Non-conference game; ^{†}Homecoming; Rankings from STATS Poll released prior to the game; All times are in Eastern time
