= 2021 Villanova Wildcats football team =

American college football season

2021 Villanova Wildcats football

CAA co-champion

NCAA Division I Quarterfinal, L 21–35 vs. South Dakota State
- Conference: Colonial Athletic Association

Ranking
- STATS: No. 8
- FCS Coaches: No. 8
- Record: 10–3 (7–1 CAA)
- Head coach: Mark Ferrante (5th season)
- Offensive coordinator: Chris Boden (3rd season)
- Offensive scheme: Spread
- Defensive coordinator: Ola Adams (3rd season)
- Base defense: 3–3–5
- Home stadium: Villanova Stadium

2021 Colonial Athletic Association football standings
	Conf.			Overall
Team	W		L	W		L
No. 3 James Madison +^	7	–	1	12	–	2
No. 8 Villanova +^	7	–	1	10	–	3
Elon	5	–	3	6	–	5
Rhode Island	4	–	4	7	–	4
Maine	4	–	4	6	–	5
Richmond	4	–	4	6	–	5
William & Mary	4	–	4	6	–	5
Stony Brook	4	–	4	5	–	6
Delaware	3	–	5	5	–	6
Towson	3	–	5	4	–	7
New Hampshire	2	–	6	3	–	8
Albany	1	–	7	2	–	9
+ – Conference co-champions; ^ – FCS playoff participant; Rankings from STATS Poll

The 2021 Villanova Wildcats football team represented Villanova University in the 2021 NCAA Division I FCS football season. They were led by fifth-year head coach Mark Ferrante and played their home games at Villanova Stadium. They competed as a member of the Colonial Athletic Association.

== Schedule ==
Date	Time	Opponent	Rank	Site	TV	Result	Attendance
September 4	12:00 p.m.	at Lehigh*	No. 16	Goodman Stadium; Bethlehem, PA	ESPN+	W 47–3	4,101
September 11	6:00 p.m.	Bucknell*	No. 12	Villanova Stadium; Villanova, PA	FloFootball	W 55–3	8,219
September 18	3:30 p.m.	No. 21 Richmond	No. 12	Villanova Stadium; Villanova, PA	FloFootball	W 34–27	12,001
September 25	12:00 p.m.	at No. 6 (FBS) Penn State*	No. 11	Beaver Stadium; University Park, PA	BTN	L 17–38	105,790
October 9	2:00 p.m.	at No. 3 James Madison	No. 11	Bridgeforth Stadium; Harrisonburg, VA	FloFootball	W 28–27	25,035
October 16	3:30 p.m.	at Albany	No. 6	Bob Ford Field at Tom & Mary Casey Stadium; Albany, NY	FloFootball	W 17–10	7,121
October 23	3:30 p.m.	No. 18 Rhode Island	No. 5	Villanova Stadium; Villanova, PA	FloFootball	W 44–0	7,341
October 30	1:00 p.m.	William & Mary	No. 4	Villanova Stadium; Villanova, PA	FloFootball	L 18–31	5,101
November 6	2:00 p.m.	at Elon	No. 10	Rhodes Stadium; Elon, NC	FloFootball	W 35–0	8,865
November 13	1:00 p.m.	Stony Brook	No. 8	Villanova Stadium; Villanova, PA	FloFootball	W 33–14	4,421
November 20	1:00 p.m.	at Delaware	No. 6	Delaware Stadium; Newark, DE (Battle of the Blue)	FloFootball	W 21–13	11,437
December 3	7:00 p.m.	No. 24 Holy Cross*	No. 6	Villanova Stadium; Villanova, PA (NCAA Division Second Round)	ESPN+	W 21–16	5,109
December 11	2:00 p.m.	No. 11 South Dakota State*	No. 6	Villanova Stadium; Villanova, PA (NCAA Division Quarterfinal)	ESPN+	L 21–35	3,401
*Non-conference game; Rankings from STATS Poll released prior to the game; All times are in Eastern time

== Game summaries ==
=== at No. 6 (FBS) Penn State ===
No. 11 Villanova at No. 6 (FBS) Penn State – Game summary

Quarter	1	2	3	4	Total
No. 11 Villanova	3	0	0	14	17
No. 6 (FBS) Penn State	7	10	14	7	38

at Beaver Stadium, University Park, Pennsylvania

- Date: September 25
- Game time: 12:00 p.m. EDT
- Game weather: 70 °F (21 °C); sunny
- Game attendance: 105,790
- Referee: Jerry McGinn
- TV announcers (BTN): Mark Followill (play-by-play), Matt Millen (analyst), and Elise Menaker (sideline)

Game information

First quarter

- PSU – Jahan Dotson, 52-yard TD pass from Sean Clifford, Jordan Stout kick, 12:59 (PSU, 7–0)
- VU – Cole Bunce, 39-yard field goal, 1:21 (PSU, 7–3)

Second quarter

- PSU – Parker Washington, 52-yard TD pass from Clifford, Stout kick, 14:07 (PSU, 14–3)
- PSU – Stout, 29-yard field goal, 8:26 (PSU, 17–3)

Third quarter

- PSU – KeAndre Lambert-Smith, 83-yard TD pass from Clifford, Stout kick, 14:14 (PSU, 24–3)
- PSU – Washington, 23-yard TD pass from Clifford, Stout kick, 1:58 (PSU, 31–3)

Fourth quarter

- PSU – Tyler Warren, 3-yard TD run, Stout kick, 13:58 (PSU, 38–3)
- VU – Rayjoun Pringle, 57-yard TD pass from Daniel Smith, Bunce kick, 9:42 (PSU, 38–10)
- VU – Pringle, 17-yard TD pass from Smith, Bunce kick, 1:38 (PSU, 38–17)

Statistics	VU	PSU
First downs	15	20
Plays–yards	60–280	65–509
Rushes–yards	26–58	34–80
Passing yards	222	429
Passing: comp–att–int	20–34–1	22–31–1
Time of possession	31:15	28:45

Team	Category	Player	Statistics
Villanova	Passing	Daniel Smith	20/34, 222 yards, 2 TD, INT
Villanova	Rushing	Jalen Jackson	7 carries, 58 yards
Villanova	Receiving	Rayjoun Pringle	4 receptions, 107 yards, 2 TD
Penn State	Passing	Sean Clifford	19/26, 401 yards, 4 TD, INT
Penn State	Rushing	John Lovett	11 carries, 45 yards
Penn State	Receiving	Parker Washington	5 receptions, 148 yards, 2 TD
