= John Miller (American football coach) =

American football coach

Current position
- Title: Running backs coach
- Team: Indiana
- Conference: Big Ten

Playing career
- 2014–2017: James Madison
- Position: Running back/Wide receiver

Coaching career (HC unless noted)
- 2018: James Madison (GA)
- 2019–2020: Texas (OQC)
- 2021–2023: James Madison (RB)
- 2024–present: Indiana (RB)

John David Miller is an American football coach who is the running backs coach for the Indiana Hoosiers football team. He played college football for the James Madison Dukes.

== Playing career ==
Miller grew up in Columbia, South Carolina and attended Spring Valley High School. He played college football at James Madison (JMU). Miller originally played running back for the Dukes before moving to wide receiver He was part of JMU's 2016 FCS National championship team. As a senior, Miller was named the Colonial Athletic Association Special Teams Player of the Year after returning 18 punts for 210 yards and a touchdown.

== Coaching career ==
Miller began his coaching career as a graduate assistant at James Madison in 2018. After one year he was hired as an offensive quality control coach at Texas. Miller spent two years on the Longhorns' coaching staff before returning to JMU in 2021 as Dukes' the running backs coach under head coach Curt Cignetti. He followed Cignetti and took the running backs coach position at Indiana.
