= Mike Greene (American football) =

American football player (born 1999)

Profile
- Position: Defensive end

Personal information
- Born: May 3, 1999 (age 27); Richmond, Virginia, U.S.
- Listed height: 6 ft 3 in (1.91 m)
- Listed weight: 293 lb (133 kg)

Career information
- High school: Highland Springs (VA)
- College: James Madison (2017–2021)
- NFL draft: 2022: undrafted

Career history
- Tampa Bay Buccaneers (2022–2024)

Career NFL statistics
- Total tackles: 8
- Stats at Pro Football Reference

Mike Greene (born May 3, 1999) is an American professional football defensive end. He played college football for the James Madison Dukes.

== Early life ==
Greene was born on May 3, 1999, in Richmond, Virginia. He attended Highland Springs High School and helped them win consecutive class championships as a junior and senior. He was an important member of those teams, being named a first-team all-conference selection as a junior and a first-team all-state choice as a junior. He committed to play college football for the James Madison Dukes.

== College career ==
As a true freshman in 2017, Greene played nine games and helped the Dukes be the runner-up in the national championship. He became a starter the following year, starting all 13 games while totaling 41 tackles, 5.5 tackles-for-loss, 2.5 sacks, a forced fumble and fumble recovery. In 2019, Greene started all 16 games at defensive tackle while also seeing time on offense in some goal line situations, finishing the season with 53 tackles, 11 for a loss and 7.5 sacks. He helped James Madison reach another national championship and earned third-team all-conference honors after his 7.5 sacks led all defensive lineman of the Colonial Athletic Association (CAA); he was also selected James Madison's defensive lineman of the year.

In the spring 2021 season (postponed from fall 2020 due to COVID-19), Greene switched from defensive tackle to defensive end and started seven games, posting 25 tackles, 10.5 for a loss, and 3.9 sacks. He led the conference in tackles for loss and was named its co-defensive player of the year, additionally being a first-team All-CAA selection, a finalist for the Buck Buchanan Award as best FCS defensive player, and a first-team All-American by several selectors. Greene played his final season for James Madison in fall of 2021, starting 12 games at defensive tackle while having 56 tackles, 12.0 tackles-for-loss and 5.0 sacks on his way to being a first-team All-American selection by HERO Sports. He finished his time at the school having appeared in 58 games with 177 total tackles, 39 tackles-for-loss and 18 sacks.

== Professional career ==
Pre-draft measurables
| Height | Weight | Arm length | Hand span | Wingspan | 40-yard dash | 10-yard split | 20-yard split | 20-yard shuttle | Three-cone drill | Vertical jump | Broad jump | Bench press |
|---|---|---|---|---|---|---|---|---|---|---|---|---|
| 6 ft 2 3/8 in (1.89 m) | 281 lb (127 kg) | 30 in (0.76 m) | 9 1/4 in (0.23 m) | 6 ft 5 in (1.96 m) | 5.16 s | 1.81 s | 3.02 s | 4.60 s | 7.61 s | 30.5 in (0.77 m) | 9 ft 1 in (2.77 m) | 27 reps |
All values from Pro Day

After going unselected in the 2022 NFL draft, Greene signed with the Tampa Bay Buccaneers after a successful tryout. He was released at the final roster cuts and subsequently re-signed to the practice squad. He signed a reserve/future contract on January 17, 2023, after having spent his entire first season on the practice squad. Greene made the Buccaneers' final roster in 2023.

Greene was waived by the Buccaneers on August 27, 2024, and re-signed to the practice squad. He signed a reserve/future contract on January 14, 2025.

On August 26, 2025, Greene was waived by the Buccaneers as part of final roster cuts.
