= Brayden Thomas =

American football player (born 1998)

Profile
- Position: Linebacker

Personal information
- Born: March 20, 1998 (age 28); Bismarck, North Dakota, U.S.
- Listed height: 6 ft 3 in (1.91 m)
- Listed weight: 260 lb (118 kg)

Career information
- High school: Bismarck
- College: Mary (2016); Minnesota State (2017–2019); North Dakota State (2020–2021)
- NFL draft: 2022: undrafted

Career history
- Los Angeles Rams (2022); Saskatchewan Roughriders (2023)

Awards and highlights
- FCS national champion (2021); First-team All-MVFC (2021); Second-team All-NSIC (2019)

Career NFL statistics
- Games played: 1
- Stats at Pro Football Reference

Brayden Thomas (born March 20, 1998) is an American professional football linebacker. He played college football for the University of Mary, Minnesota State, and North Dakota State.

== Early life ==
Thomas grew up in Bismarck, North Dakota and attended Bismarck High School.

== College career ==
Thomas began his college football career at the University of Mary. He played one season for the Marauders before transferring to Minnesota State-Mankato. Thomas was named second team All-Northern Sun Intercollegiate Conference (NSIC) as a junior after he recorded 21 tackles for loss and 11.5 sacks. His senior was canceled due to COVID-19. After his senior season, Thomas transferred to North Dakota State (NDSU) as a graduate transfer. He decided to utilize the extra year of eligibility granted to college athletes who played in the 2020 season due to the coronavirus pandemic and return to NDSU for a sixth season. In the final season of his college career, Thomas had nine sacks and 14.5 tackles for loss and was named first-team All-Missouri Valley Football Conference.

== Professional career ==
=== Los Angeles Rams ===
Thomas was signed by the Los Angeles Rams as an undrafted free agent on April 30, 2022. He was waived during final roster cuts on August 30, 2022, but was signed to the team's practice squad the next day. Thomas was elevated to the active roster in December 2022, for the team's Week 16 game against the Denver Broncos and made his NFL debut in the game. He signed a reserve/futures contract on January 9, 2023, and was waived by the Rams on March 10, 2023.

=== Saskatchewan Roughriders ===
On September 12, 2023, Thomas signed with the Saskatchewan Roughriders of the Canadian Football League (CFL). He was released on April 25, 2024.
