= Missouri State Bears football statistical leaders =

The Missouri State Bears football statistical leaders are individual statistical leaders of the Missouri State Bears football program in various categories, including passing, rushing, receiving, total offense, defensive stats, and kicking. Within those areas, the lists identify single-game, single-season, and career leaders. The Bears represent Missouri State University in the NCAA Division I FBS Conference USA.

Although Missouri State began competing in intercollegiate football in 1909, the school's official record book considers the "modern era" to have begun in 1949. Records from before this year are often incomplete and inconsistent, and they are generally not included in these lists.

These lists are dominated by more recent players for several reasons:

- Since 1949, seasons have increased from 10 games to 11 and then 12 games in length.
- The NCAA didn't allow freshmen to play varsity football until 1972 (with the exception of the World War II years), allowing players to have four-year careers.
- Missouri State played in the second level of Division I football, known before 2006 as Division I-AA and since then as Division I FCS, from 1981 to 2024. While regular seasons at that level would not expand to the FBS limit of 12 games until the 2026 season, normally being restricted to 11, two aspects of FCS rules have allowed for more games.
  - The NCAA organizes an FCS championship tournament, currently called the NCAA Division I Football Championship. The Bears reached the FCS playoffs 4 times, playing 5 games, between 1981 and 2024. The NCAA did not count I-AA/FCS playoff games toward official season statistics until 2002 (the same season that it first counted FBS bowl games toward official season statistics), and most programs that played at this level follow this practice. Missouri State played in only two playoff games after 2001 (one each in the 2020 and 2021 seasons).
  - Additionally, pre-2026 NCAA rules allowed FCS teams to schedule 12 regular-season games in years when the period starting with the Thursday before Labor Day and ending with the final Saturday in November contains 14 Saturdays.
- Since 2018, players in both FBS and FCS have been allowed to participate in as many as four games in a redshirt season; previously, playing in even one game "burned" the redshirt. Since 2024, postseason games have not counted against the four-game limit. These changes to redshirt rules have given very recent players several extra games to accumulate statistics.
- Due to COVID-19 issues, the NCAA ruled that the 2020 season would not count against the athletic eligibility of any football player, giving everyone who played in that season the opportunity for five years of eligibility instead of the normal four.

These lists are updated through the end of the 2025 regular season. Players active for Missouri State in 2025 are in bold.

== Passing ==
=== Passing yards ===
Career
| Rk | Player | Yards | Years |
|---|---|---|---|
| 1 | Cody Kirby | 8,183 | 2007 2008 2009 2010 |
| 2 | **Jacob Clark** | 7,938 | 2022 2023 2024 2025 |
| 3 | Jeremy Hoog | 6,959 | 1994 1995 1996 1997 |
| 4 | Peyton Huslig | 6,405 | 2017 2018 2019 |
| 5 | Jason Shelley | 5,990 | 2021 2022 |
| 6 | Mitch Ware | 4,882 | 1976 1977 1978 1979 |
| 7 | Kierra Harris | 4,284 | 2011 2012 2013 2014 |
| 8 | DeAndre Smith | 4,080 | 1987 1988 1989 1990 |
| 9 | Austin Moherman | 3,964 | 2000 2001 |
| 10 | A.J. Porter | 3,927 | 2002 2003 2004 2005 |

Single season
| Rk | Player | Yards | Year |
|---|---|---|---|
| 1 | **Jacob Clark** | 3,604 | 2024 |
| 2 | Jason Shelley | 3,347 | 2021 |
| 3 | **Jacob Clark** | 3,244 | 2025 |
| 4 | Jay Rodgers | 2,741 | 1999 |
| 5 | Jason Shelley | 2,643 | 2022 |
| 6 | Derek Jensen | 2,554 | 1998 |
| 7 | Peyton Huslig | 2,311 | 2019 |
| 8 | Cody Kirby | 2,307 | 2010 |
| 9 | Jordan Pachot | 2,285 | 2023 |
| 10 | Jeremy Hoog | 2,196 | 1996 |

Single game
| Rk | Player | Yards | Year | Opponent |
|---|---|---|---|---|
| 1 | A.J. Porter | 460 | 2003 | Illinois State |
| 2 | **Jacob Clark** | 431 | 2024 | Murray State |
| 3 | **Jacob Clark** | 414 | 2023 | Utah Tech |
| 4 | DeAndre Smith | 405 | 1990 | Tulsa |
| 5 | Peyton Huslig | 404 | 2018 | Southern Illinois |
| 6 | Jay Rodgers | 395 | 1999 | Southern Illinois |
| 7 | **Jacob Clark** | 388 | 2024 | UT Martin |
| 8 | **Jacob Clark** | 379 | 2024 | Indiana State |
| 9 | Jeremy Hoog | 375 | 1994 | Liberty |
| 10 | Jason Shelley | 372 | 2021 | Youngstown State |

=== Passing touchdowns ===
Career
| Rk | Player | TDs | Years |
|---|---|---|---|
| 1 | **Jacob Clark** | 64 | 2022 2023 2024 2025 |
| 2 | Cody Kirby | 47 | 2007 2008 2009 2010 |
| 3 | Jason Shelley | 40 | 2021 2022 |
| 4 | Peyton Huslig | 38 | 2017 2018 2019 |
| 5 | Mitch Ware | 36 | 1976 1977 1978 1979 |
| | Jeremy Hoog | 36 | 1994 1995 1996 1997 |
| 7 | A.J. Porter | 33 | 2002 2003 2004 2005 |
| | Kierra Harris | 33 | 2011 2012 2013 2014 |
| 9 | Greg Arterburn | 24 | 1982 1983 1984 1985 |
| | Jay Rodgers | 24 | 1999 |

Single season
| Rk | Player | TDs | Year |
|---|---|---|---|
| 1 | **Jacob Clark** | 28 | 2025 |
| 2 | **Jacob Clark** | 26 | 2024 |
| 3 | Jay Rodgers | 24 | 1999 |
| 4 | Jason Shelley | 22 | 2021 |
| 5 | Kierra Harris | 19 | 2014 |
| | Jordan Pachot | 19 | 2023 |
| 7 | Brodie Lambert | 18 | 2016 |
| | Jason Shelley | 18 | 2022 |
| 9 | Trevor Wooden | 17 | 2011 |
| 10 | Derek Jensen | 16 | 1998 |
| | Peyton Huslig | 16 | 2019 |

Single game
| Rk | Player | TDs | Year | Opponent |
|---|---|---|---|---|
| 1 | Jay Rodgers | 5 | 1999 | Southern Illinois |
| | A.J. Porter | 5 | 2003 | Illinois State |
| | A.J. Porter | 5 | 2003 | Western Illinois |
| | Brodie Lambert | 5 | 2016 | Western Illinois |
| | Jason Shelley | 5 | 2022 | UT Martin |
| | **Jacob Clark** | 5 | 2023 | Utah Tech |
| 7 | 17 times by 13 players | 4 | Most recent: **Jacob Clark**, 2025 vs. Arkansas State | |

== Rushing ==
=== Rushing yards ===
Career
| Rk | Player | Yards | Years |
|---|---|---|---|
| 1 | John Gianini | 2,867 | 1976 1977 1978 1979 1980 |
| 2 | Keith Williams | 2,694 | 1982 1983 1984 1985 |
| 3 | Fred Tabron | 2,415 | 1970 1971 1972 1973 |
| 4 | Cornelius Perry | 2,381 | 1963 1964 1965 |
| 5 | Cody Pratt | 2,339 | 2003 2004 |
| 6 | Gino Travline | 2,286 | 1973 1974 1975 1976 |
| 7 | DeAndre Smith | 2,276 | 1987 1988 1989 1990 |
| 8 | Jacardia Wright | 2,231 | 2022 2023 2024 |
| 9 | Jason Ringena | 2,218 | 1998 1999 2000 2001 |
| 10 | Maurice Daniels | 2,040 | 1996 1997 1998 |

Single season
| Rk | Player | Yards | Year |
|---|---|---|---|
| 1 | Michael Cosey | 1,453 | 1996 |
| 2 | Cody Pratt | 1,223 | 2003 |
| 3 | Keith Williams | 1,201 | 1985 |
| 4 | Gino Travline | 1,181 | 1975 |
| 5 | Maurice Daniels | 1,120 | 1998 |
| 6 | Cody Pratt | 1,116 | 2004 |
| 7 | Chris Douglas | 1,051 | 2010 |
| 8 | Mark Daniels | 1,039 | 1979 |
| 9 | Eric Jenkins | 1,037 | 1990 |
| 10 | Shomari Lawrence | 1,021 | 2025 |

Single game
| Rk | Player | Yards | Year | Opponent |
|---|---|---|---|---|
| 1 | Maurice Daniels | 248 | 1998 | UC Northrdge |
| 2 | Mike Cosey | 240 | 1996 | Jacksonville St. |
| 3 | Cornelius Perry | 238 | 1964 | Mo. S&T |
| 4 | Keith Williams | 232 | 1985 | Eastern Ill. |
| 5 | Jason Ringena | 222 | 2000 | SE Mo. St. |
| 6 | Cody Pratt | 217 | 2004 | Drake |
| 7 | Greg Lawson | 214 | 1974 | Lincoln |
| 8 | Ardie McCoy | 213 | 1968 | NW Missouri |
| 9 | John Gianini | 211 | 1980 | Harding |
| 10 | John Batten | 210 | 1951 | Delta State |

=== Rushing touchdowns ===
Career
| Rk | Player | TDs | Years |
|---|---|---|---|
| 1 | DeAndre Smith | 40 | 1987 1988 1989 1990 |
| 2 | Cody Kirby | 33 | 2007 2008 2009 2010 |
| 3 | John Gianini | 30 | 1976 1977 1978 1979 1980 |
| 4 | Jacardia Wright | 29 | 2022 2023 2024 |
| 5 | Fred Tabron | 28 | 1970 1971 1972 1973 |
| 6 | Mark Daniels | 25 | 1977 1978 1979 1980 |
| 7 | Cornelius Perry | 24 | 1963 1964 1965 |
| | Jason Ringena | 24 | 1998 1999 2000 2001 |
| 9 | Cody Pratt | 23 | 2003 2004 |
| 10 | Johnny Longstreet | 21 | 1981 1982 1983 1984 |

Single season
| Rk | Player | TDs | Year |
|---|---|---|---|
| 1 | Gerald Davis | 19 | 2007 |
| 2 | DeAndre Smith | 18 | 1990 |
| 3 | Mark Daniels | 17 | 1979 |
| 4 | DeAndre Smith | 15 | 1989 |
| 5 | Jacardia Wright | 14 | 2024 |
| 6 | John Gianini | 13 | 1978 |
| | Michael Cosey | 13 | 1996 |
| | Cody Kirby | 13 | 2010 |
| 9 | Greg Lawson | 12 | 1974 |
| | Jason Ringena | 12 | 1999 |
| | Cody Pratt | 12 | 2004 |

Single game
| Rk | Player | TDs | Year | Opponent |
|---|---|---|---|---|
| 1 | Gerald Davis | 5 | 2007 | Indiana St. |
| 2 | Louis Stark | 4 | 1927 | SW Baptist |
| | Tommy Burns | 4 | 1955 | Emporia St. |
| | Cornelius Perry | 4 | 1964 | Mo. S&T |
| | Tom Herman | 4 | 1973 | Missouri S&T |
| | Greg Lawson | 4 | 1974 | Lincoln |
| | Bill Hedgepath | 4 | 1981 | Lincoln |
| | Derek Jensen | 4 | 1998 | Illinois State |
| | Zach Dechant | 4 | 2002 | SE Mo. St. |
| | Cody Pratt | 4 | 2003 | East Central |
| | Gerald Davis | 4 | 2007 | Missouri S&T |
| | Cody Kirby | 4 | 2010 | Murray State |

== Receiving ==
=== Receptions ===
Career
| Rk | Player | Rec | Years |
|---|---|---|---|
| 1 | Clay Harbor | 150 | 2006 2007 2008 2009 |
| 2 | Malik Earl | 147 | 2014 2015 2016 2017 |
| 3 | Julian Burton | 146 | 2010 2011 2012 2013 2014 |
| 4 | Jermaine Saffold | 139 | 2009 2010 2011 |
| 5 | Chance Thurman | 137 | 1996 1997 1998 1999 |
| 6 | Jason Cannon | 136 | 1995 1996 1997 |
| 7 | **Jmariyae Robinson** | 128 | 2022 2023 2024 2025 |
| 8 | Damoriea Vick | 119 | 2018 2019 2020 2021 |
| 9 | Cadarrius Dotson | 117 | 2009 2010 2011 2012 |
| 10 | Jeff Hewitt | 116 | 1998 1999 2000 |

Single season
| Rk | Player | Rec | Year |
|---|---|---|---|
| 1 | Raylen Sharpe | 73 | 2023 |
| 2 | Ty Scott | 66 | 2021 |
| 3 | Hunter Wood | 63 | 2024 |
| 4 | Michael Sparks | 62 | 2005 |
| 5 | Mark Marcos | 59 | 2001 |
| | Clay Harbor | 59 | 2009 |
| | Dorian Buford | 59 | 2012 |
| 8 | Jeff Hewitt | 57 | 2000 |
| 9 | Steve Rush | 56 | 2004 |
| | Malik Earl | 56 | 2017 |
| | Xavier Lane | 56 | 2021 |

Single game
| Rk | Player | Rec | Year | Opponent |
|---|---|---|---|---|
| 1 | Malik Earl | 14 | 2017 | Western Ill. |
| 2 | Jeff Hewitt | 13 | 2000 | Indiana St. |
| | Raylen Sharpe | 13 | 2023 | North Dakota St. |
| 4 | Jason Cannon | 11 | 1995 | Western Ill. |
| | Clay Harbor | 11 | 2009 | Southern Illinois |
| | Malik Earl | 11 | 2016 | Indiana St. |
| | Raylen Sharpe | 11 | 2023 | UNI |
| | Isaiah Myers | 11 | 2026 | Delaware |
| 9 | Tom McIntyre | 10 | 1971 | SE Missouri |
| | Glen Wiese | 10 | 1972 | Lincoln |
| | Dee Debro | 10 | 1995 | UNI |
| | Mark Marcos | 10 | 2001 | Youngstown St. |
| | Steve Rush | 10 | 2004 | Sam Houston |
| | Steve Rush | 10 | 2004 | Southern Ill. |
| | Steve Rush | 10 | 2004 | Western Ky. |
| | Tamarkus McElvane | 10 | 2007 | Central Ark. |
| | Julian Burton | 10 | 2014 | Central Ark. |
| | Xavier Lane | 10 | 2021 | Youngstown St. |
| | Ty Scott | 10 | 2021 | North Dakota |
| | Hunter Wood | 10 | 2024 | Lindenwood |
| | Hunter Wood | 10 | 2024 | Murray State |
| | Jmariyae Robinson | 10 | 2026 | Delaware |

=== Receiving yards ===
Career
| Rk | Player | Yards | Years |
|---|---|---|---|
| 1 | Jermaine Saffold | 2,221 | 2009 2010 2011 |
| 2 | Steve Newbold | 1,990 | 1977 1978 1979 1980 |
| 3 | Chance Thurman | 1,971 | 1996 1997 1998 1999 |
| 4 | Malik Earl | 1,962 | 2014 2015 2016 2017 |
| 5 | Julian Burton | 1,942 | 2010 2011 2012 2013 2014 |
| 6 | Jason Cannon | 1,913 | 1995 1996 1997 |
| 7 | Clay Harbor | 1,906 | 2006 2007 2008 2009 |
| 8 | Tom Hamilton | 1,803 | 1974 1975 1976 1977 |
| 9 | Ty Scott | 1,784 | 2021 2022 |
| 10 | Jeff Hewitt | 1,730 | 1998 1999 2000 |

Single season
| Rk | Player | Yards | Year |
|---|---|---|---|
| 1 | Ty Scott | 1,110 | 2021 |
| 2 | Raylen Sharpe | 991 | 2023 |
| 3 | Jermaine Saffold | 913 | 2011 |
| 4 | Mark Marcos | 905 | 2001 |
| 5 | Jermaine Saffold | 869 | 2010 |
| 6 | Jason Cannon | 842 | 1995 |
| 7 | Jeff Hewitt | 820 | 2000 |
| 8 | Lynn May | 809 | 1982 |
| 9 | Xavier Lane | 784 | 2021 |
| 10 | Malik Earl | 774 | 2017 |

Single game
| Rk | Player | Yards | Year | Opponent |
|---|---|---|---|---|
| 1 | Steven Rush | 249 | 2003 | Illinois St. |
| 2 | Isaiah Myers | 242 | 2026 | Delaware |
| 3 | Jason Cannon | 223 | 1995 | Western Ill. |
| 4 | Steve Newbold | 215 | 1979 | Pittsburg St. |
| 5 | Jermaine Saffold | 207 | 2011 | Illinois State |
| 6 | Pete Bybel | 206 | 1957 | Truman St. |
| 7 | Jeff Hewitt | 205 | 2000 | Indiana St. |
| 8 | Mark Marcos | 197 | 2001 | Illinois St. |
| 9 | Julian Burton | 194 | 2014 | Central Ark. |
| 10 | Phil Perkins | 183 | 1995 | Truman State |

=== Receiving touchdowns ===
Career
| Rk | Player | TDs | Years |
|---|---|---|---|
| 1 | Steve Newbold | 18 | 1977 1978 1979 1980 |
| | Jeff Hewitt | 18 | 1998 1999 2000 |
| 3 | Jason Cannon | 17 | 1995 1996 1997 |
| | Jermaine Saffold | 17 | 2009 2010 2011 |
| 5 | **Jmariyae Robinson** | 16 | 2022 2023 2024 2025 |
| 6 | Steven Rush | 15 | 2003 2004 |
| 7 | Ty Scott | 13 | 2021 2022 |
| 8 | Keith Williams | 12 | 1982 1983 1984 1985 |
| 9 | Bill Douglass | 11 | 1963 1964 1965 1966 |
| | Julian Burton | 11 | 2010 2011 2012 2013 2014 |
| | Jordan Murray | 11 | 2018 2019 2020 2021 |

Single season
| Rk | Player | TDs | Year |
|---|---|---|---|
| 1 | Jeff Hewitt | 8 | 1998 |
| | Steven Rush | 8 | 2004 |
| | Jermaine Saffold | 8 | 2011 |
| | Ty Scott | 8 | 2021 |
| 5 | Keith Williams | 7 | 1985 |
| | Jason Cannon | 7 | 1997 |
| | Steven Rush | 7 | 2003 |
| | Kaya Farris | 7 | 2003 |
| | Gannon Sinclair | 7 | 2014 |
| | Raylen Sharpe | 7 | 2023 |
| | **Jmariyae Robinson** | 7 | 2025 |

Single game
| Rk | Player | TDs | Year | Opponent |
|---|---|---|---|---|
| 1 | Steven Rush | 4 | 2003 | Illinois St. |
| | Kaya Farris | 4 | 2003 | Western Illinois |
| 3 | Jim Julian | 3 | 1950 | NW Missouri St. |
| | Pete Bybel | 3 | 1957 | Truman St. |
| | Jeff Hewitt | 3 | 1998 | Illinois St. |
| | Jason Randall | 3 | 2017 | Indiana St. |
| | Ty Scott | 3 | 2022 | UT Martin |

== Total offense ==
Total offense is the sum of passing and rushing statistics. It does not include receiving or returns.

Unlike most NCAA programs, Missouri State does not publish a leaderboard for "touchdowns responsible for", defined as combined passing and rushing touchdowns, over any time frame (career, season, single-game).

=== Total offense yards ===
Career
| Rk | Player | Yards | Years |
|---|---|---|---|
| 1 | Cody Kirby | 9,019 | 2007 2008 2009 2010 |
| 2 | **Jacob Clark** | 8,007 | 2022 2023 2024 2025 |
| 3 | Peyton Huslig | 7,465 | 2017 2018 2019 |
| 4 | Jeremy Hoog | 7,326 | 1994 1995 1996 1997 |
| 5 | Jason Shelley | 6,594 | 2021 2022 |
| 6 | DeAndre Smith | 6,356 | 1987 1988 1989 1990 |
| 7 | Mitch Ware | 5,602 | 1976 1977 1978 1979 |
| 8 | Kierra Harris | 5,245 | 2011 2012 2013 2014 |
| 9 | A.J. Porter | 4,058 | 2002 2003 2004 2005 |
| 10 | Greg Arterburn | 4,010 | 1982 1983 1984 1985 |

Single season
| Rk | Player | Yards | Year |
|---|---|---|---|
| 1 | Jason Shelley | 3,789 | 2021 |
| 2 | **Jacob Clark** | 3,612 | 2024 |
| 3 | **Jacob Clark** | 3,228 | 2025 |
| 4 | Jason Shelley | 2,805 | 2022 |
| 5 | Jay Rodgers | 2,768 | 1999 |
| 6 | Cody Kirby | 2,710 | 2010 |
| 7 | Derek Jensen | 2,697 | 1998 |
| 8 | DeAndre Smith | 2,635 | 1990 |
| 9 | Peyton Huslig | 2,602 | 2017 |
| 10 | DeAndre Smith | 2,530 | 1989 |

Single game
| Rk | Player | Yards | Year | Opponent |
|---|---|---|---|---|
| 1 | DeAndre Smith | 469 | 1990 | Tulsa |
| 2 | Jason Shelley | 443 | 2021 | Youngstown State |
| 3 | A.J. Porter | 426 | 2003 | Illinois State |
| 4 | Peyton Huslig | 419 | 2018 | Southern Illinois |
| 5 | **Jacob Clark** | 418 | 2024 | Murray State |
| 6 | Jeremy Hoog | 415 | 1995 | Western Illinois |
| 7 | **Jacob Clark** | 414 | 2023 | Utah Tech |
| 8 | Kierra Harris | 397 | 2014 | Central Arkansas |
| 9 | Jay Rodgers | 393 | 1999 | Southern Illinois |
| 10 | Brodie Lambert | 390 | 2016 | Southern Illinois |

== Defense ==
=== Interceptions ===
Career
| Rk | Player | Ints | Years |
|---|---|---|---|
| 1 | Adrion Smith | 24 | 1990 1991 1992 1993 |
| 2 | Mike Armentrout | 18 | 1981 1982 1983 1984 |
| 3 | Bill Beckett | 15 | 1975 1976 1977 1978 |
| 4 | Malcolm Hukriede | 14 | 1970 1971 |
| | Jon Castleman | 14 | 1978 1979 1980 1981 |
| 6 | Tim Ries | 13 | 1975 1976 1977 1978 |
| | Craig Phillips | 13 | 1986 1987 1988 1989 |
| 8 | Chris Waters | 12 | 1977 1978 1979 1980 |
| 9 | Mark Matheson | 11 | 1972 1973 1974 1975 |
| | Willie Parks | 11 | 1992 1993 1994 1995 |

Single season
| Rk | Player | Ints | Year |
|---|---|---|---|
| 1 | Mike Armentrout | 10 | 1983 |
| 2 | Larry Goddard | 9 | 1965 |
| 3 | Malcolm Hukriede | 8 | 1971 |
| 4 | Adrion Smith | 7 | 1991 |
| | Adrion Smith | 7 | 1992 |
| | Darren Barnett | 7 | 2004 |
| 7 | Malcolm Hukriede | 6 | 1970 |
| | Steve Jennings | 6 | 1970 |
| | Adrion Smith | 6 | 1993 |
| | Willie Parks | 6 | 1995 |

Single game
| Rk | Player | Ints | Year | Opponent |
|---|---|---|---|---|
| 1 | Chris Waters | 4 | 1979 | Truman St. |
| | Dennis Scott | 4 | 1964 | Missouri S&T |
| | Larry Goddard | 4 | 1965 | Pittsburg St. |
| 4 | Randy Wheeler | 3 | 1966 | Mo. S&T |
| | Adrion Smith | 3 | 1991 | Indiana St. |

=== Tackles ===
Career
| Rk | Player | Tackles | Years |
|---|---|---|---|
| 1 | P.J. Jones | 500 | 1998 1999 2000 2001 |
| 2 | Corky Martin | 487 | 1997 1998 1999 2000 |
| 3 | Dylan Cole | 457 | 2013 2014 2015 2016 |
| 4 | John Harvey | 452 | 1978 1979 1980 1981 |
| 5 | Dennis O'Hagan | 423 | 1976 1977 1978 1979 1980 |
| 6 | DeLaun Fowler | 420 | 1992 1993 1994 1995 |
| 7 | Caleb Schaffitzel | 386 | 2011 2012 2013 2014 |
| 8 | Bill Walter | 385 | 1988 1989 1990 1991 |
| 9 | James Houston | 378 | 1982 1983 1984 1985 |
| 10 | Cornelius Blow | 368 | 1981 1982 1983 1984 |

Single season
| Rk | Player | Tackles | Year |
|---|---|---|---|
| 1 | Dennis O'Hagan | 226 | 1980 |
| 2 | John Harvey | 186 | 1979 |
| 3 | Matt Soraghan | 183 | 1987 |
| 4 | P.J. Jones | 163 | 2001 |
| 5 | James Houston | 159 | 1985 |
| 6 | Mike Murphy | 158 | 1978 |
| 7 | Dylan Cole | 152 | 2015 |
| 8 | Bill Moriarty | 146 | 1982 |
| 9 | Dennis O'Hagan | 145 | 1979 |
| 10 | Dylan Cole | 142 | 2016 |

=== Sacks ===
Career
| Rk | Player | Sacks | Years |
|---|---|---|---|
| 1 | Dennis Heim | 41.0 | 1974 1975 1976 1977 |
| 2 | Bill Walter | 40.0 | 1988 1989 1990 1991 |
| 3 | Morgan Trokey | 29.0 | 1976 1977 1978 |
| 4 | Keith Odehnal | 27.0 | 1979 1980 1981 1982 |
| | Michael Fox | 27.0 | 1989 1990 |
| 6 | Darrin Newbold | 26.0 | 1980 1981 1982 |
| 7 | Dean Schuepbach | 24.0 | 1980 1981 1982 1983 1984 |
| | DeLaun Fowler | 24.0 | 1992 1993 1994 1995 |
| 9 | James Turnage | 23.0 | 1988 1989 |
| 10 | Kevin Ellis | 20.5 | 2018 2019 2020 2021 2022 |

Single season
| Rk | Player | Sacks | Year |
|---|---|---|---|
| 1 | Dennis Heim | 16.0 | 1976 |
| | Michael Fox | 16.0 | 1989 |
| 3 | Darrin Newbold | 15.0 | 1982 |
| | Dean Schuepbach | 15.0 | 1984 |

== Kicking ==
=== Field goals made ===
Career
| Rk | Player | FGs | Years |
|---|---|---|---|
| 1 | Wayne Boyer | 49 | 1993 1994 1995 1996 |
| 2 | Jose Pizano | 45 | 2020 2021 2022 |
| 3 | Jon Scifres | 39 | 2002 2003 2004 2005 |
| 4 | Chris Potthast | 38 | 1986 1987 1988 1989 |
| | Travis Brawner | 38 | 1997 1998 1999 |
| 6 | Brian Long | 29 | 2000 2001 2002 |
| 7 | Austin Witmer | 28 | 2010 2011 2012 2013 |
| 8 | Jan Stahle | 27 | 1976 1977 1978 |
| 9 | Richard Grote | 26 | 1990 1991 1992 |
| 10 | **Yousef Obeid** | 25 | 2024 2025 |

Single season
| Rk | Player | FGs | Year |
|---|---|---|---|
| 1 | Wayne Boyer | 25 | 1996 |
| 2 | Travis Brawner | 21 | 1997 |
| | Jose Pizano | 21 | 2021 |
| 4 | Jon Scifres | 15 | 2004 |
| 5 | Wayne Boyer | 14 | 1995 |
| | **Yousef Obeid** | 14 | 2025 |
| 7 | Chris Potthast | 13 | 1987 |
| 8 | Richard Grote | 12 | 1990 |
| | Richard Grote | 12 | 1992 |
| | Brian Long | 12 | 2001 |
| | Austin Witmer | 12 | 2012 |
| | Marcelo Bonani | 12 | 2014 |
| | Zach Drake | 12 | 2017 |
| | Jose Pizano | 12 | 2020 |
| | Jose Pizano | 12 | 2022 |

Single game
| Rk | Player | FGs | Year | Opponent |
|---|---|---|---|---|
| 1 | Richard Grote | 4 | 1990 | Indiana State |
| | Wayne Boyer | 4 | 1996 | McNeese |
| | Wayne Boyer | 4 | 1996 | UT Martin |
| | Yousef Obeid | 4 | 2026 | Florida International |
| 5 | 36 times by 17 players | 3 | Most recent: **Yousef Obeid**, 2026 vs. Kennesaw State | |
