= 2003 Northern Iowa Panthers football team =

American college football season

2003 Northern Iowa Panthers football

Gateway champion

NCAA Division I-AA Quarterfinal, L 7–37 at Delaware
- Conference: Gateway Football Conference

Ranking
- Sports Network: No. 5
- Record: 10–3 (6–1 Gateway)
- Head coach: Mark Farley (3rd season)
- Offensive coordinator: Bill Salmon (3rd season)
- Home stadium: UNI-Dome

2003 Gateway Football Conference standings
	Conf.			Overall
Team	W		L	W		L
No. 5 Northern Iowa +^	6	–	1	10	–	3
No. 9 Southern Illinois +^	6	–	1	10	–	2
No. 6 Western Illinois ^	5	–	2	9	–	4
No. 7 Western Kentucky ^	5	–	2	9	–	4
Illinois State	3	–	4	6	–	6
Youngstown State	2	–	5	5	–	7
Southwest Missouri State	1	–	6	4	–	7
Indiana State	0	–	7	3	–	9
+ – Conference co-champions; ^ – NCAA Division I-AA playoff participant; Rankings from The Sports Network poll

The 2003 Northern Iowa Panthers football team represented the University of Northern Iowa as a member of the Gateway Football Conference during the 2003 NCAA Division I-AA football season. Led by third-year head coach Mark Farley, the Panthers compiled an overall record of 10–3 with a mark of 6–1 in conference play, winning the Gateway title. Northern Iowa advanced to the NCAA Division I-AA Football Championship playoffs, where the Panthers beat Montana State in the first round before falling to eventual national champion Delaware in the quarterfinals. Northern Iowa played home games at the UNI-Dome in Cedar Falls, Iowa.

== Schedule ==
Date	Time	Opponent	Rank	Site	TV	Result	Attendance	Source
August 30	6:00 p.m.	at Iowa State*		Jack Trice Stadium; Ames, IA		L 10–17	48,088	
September 6		Northern Michigan*		UNI-Dome; Cedar Falls, IA		W 62–0		
September 18	6:30 p.m.	at Stephen F. Austin*		Homer Bryce Stadium; Nacogdoches, TX		W 38–24	7,841	
September 27	4:00 p.m.	No. 11 Northwestern State*		UNI-Dome; Cedar Falls, IA		W 43–10	13,102	
October 4		at Illinois State	No. 16	Hancock Stadium; Normal, IL		W 16–7	12,026	
October 11		Indiana State	No. 12	UNI-Dome; Cedar Falls, IA		W 22–14		
October 18		at Southwest Missouri State	No. 11	Plaster Sports Complex; Springfield, MO		W 26–20	14,911	
October 25		at No. 7 Western Illinois	No. 9	Hanson Field; Macomb, IL		W 38–30	8,302	
November 1		Youngstown State	No. 6	UNI-Dome; Cedar Falls, IA		W 47–9		
November 8		at No. 12 Western Kentucky	No. 6	L. T. Smith Stadium; Bowling Green, KY		L 3–24	7,518	
November 15		No. 2 Southern Illinois	No. 11	UNI-Dome; Cedar Falls, IA		W 43–40	15,088	
November 29		No. 24 Montana State*	No. 7	UNI-Dome; Cedar Falls, IA (NCAA Division I-AA First Round)		W 35–14	10,165	
December 6	11:00 a.m.	at No. 3 Delaware*	No. 7	Delaware Stadium; Newark, DE (NCAA Division I-AA Quarterfinal)	ESPN Plus	L 7–37	11,881	
*Non-conference game; Rankings from The Sports Network Poll released prior to the game; All times are in Central time
