= 2003 Southern Illinois Salukis football team =

American college football season

2003 Southern Illinois Salukis football

Gateway co-champion

NCAA Division I-AA First Round, L 7–48 vs. Delaware
- Conference: Gateway Football Conference

Ranking
- Sports Network: No. 9
- Record: 10–2 (6–1 Gateway)
- Head coach: Jerry Kill (3rd season)
- Offensive coordinator: Matt Limegrover (3rd season)
- Defensive coordinator: Tracy Claeys (3rd season)
- Home stadium: McAndrew Stadium

2003 Gateway Football Conference standings
	Conf.			Overall
Team	W		L	W		L
No. 5 Northern Iowa +^	6	–	1	10	–	3
No. 9 Southern Illinois +^	6	–	1	10	–	2
No. 6 Western Illinois ^	5	–	2	9	–	4
No. 7 Western Kentucky ^	5	–	2	9	–	4
Illinois State	3	–	4	6	–	6
Youngstown State	2	–	5	5	–	7
Southwest Missouri State	1	–	6	4	–	7
Indiana State	0	–	7	3	–	9
+ – Conference co-champions; ^ – NCAA Division I-AA playoff participant; Rankings from The Sports Network poll

The 2003 Southern Illinois Salukis football team represented Southern Illinois University as a member of the Gateway Football Conference during the 2003 NCAA Division I-AA football season. They were led by third-year head coach Jerry Kill and played their home games at McAndrew Stadium in Carbondale, Illinois. The Salukis finished the season with a 10–2 record overall and a 6–1 record in conference play, making them conference co-champions with Northern Iowa. The team received an at-large bid to the Division I-AA playoffs, where they lost to Delaware in the first round. Southern Illinois was ranked No. 9 in The Sports Network's postseason ranking of FCS teams.

== Schedule ==
Date	Opponent	Rank	Site	Result	Attendance	Source
August 28	Quincy*		McAndrew Stadium; Carbondale, IL	W 64–14	7,854	
September 6	at No. 22 Southeast Missouri State*		Houck Stadium; Cape Girardeau, MO	W 28–7	11,110	
September 13	Murray State*	No. 21	McAndrew Stadium; Carbondale, IL	W 32–7	10,167	
September 27	Saint Joseph's (IN)*	No. 13	McAndrew Stadium; Carbondale, IL	W 75–0	7,531	
October 4	at Indiana State	No. 11	Memorial Stadium; Terre Haute, IN	W 37–14	2,481	
October 11	Illinois State	No. 8	McAndrew Stadium; Carbondale, IL	W 45–17	13,247	
October 18	at No. 2 Western Illinois	No. 7	Hanson Field; Macomb, IL	W 37–32	19,287	
October 25	Southwest Missouri State	No. 4	McAndrew Stadium; Carbondale, IL	W 20–6	8,873	
November 1	at No. 8 Western Kentucky	No. 3	L. T. Smith Stadium; Bowling Green, KY	W 28–24	13,430	
November 8	Youngstown State	No. 3	McAndrew Stadium; Carbondale, IL	W 24–17	10,814	
November 15	at No. 11 Northern Iowa	No. 2	UNI-Dome; Cedar Falls, IA	L 40–43	15,088	
November 29	at No. 3 Delaware*	No. 4	Delaware Stadium; Newark, DE (NCAA Division I-AA First Round)	L 7–48	14,572	
*Non-conference game; Rankings from The Sports Network Poll released prior to the game
