= Randy Ball (American football) =

American football coach

Biographical details
- Born: c. 1951 (age 74–75); Muskogee, Oklahoma, U.S.

Playing career
- 1969–1972: Northeast Missouri State
- Position: Offensive lineman

Coaching career (HC unless noted)
- 1973: Hannibal HS (MO) (OL/DL)
- 1974–1976: Hazelwood West HS (MO) (JV/OL)
- 1977: Missouri Western (OL)
- 1978–1980: Illinois State (OL)
- 1981–1982: Northeast Missouri State (OC/OL)
- 1983–1989: Western Illinois (OC/OL)
- 1990–1998: Western Illinois
- 1999–2005: Southwest Missouri State / Missouri State
- 2007: Drake (DL)

Administrative career (AD unless noted)
- 2009–2012: Las Vegas Locomotives (DPP)
- 2013–2020: Kansas City Chiefs (scouting assistant)

Head coaching record
- Overall: 98–83–1
- Tournaments: 3–4 (NCAA I-AA playoffs)

Accomplishments and honors

Championships
- 2 Gateway Football (1997–1998)

Awards
- 2× All-MIAA (1971–1972); Gateway Football Coach of the Year (1997)

Randy Ball (born c. 1951) is an American former college football player and coach. He was the head coach at Western Illinois University from 1990 to 1998, and Missouri State University from 1999 through 2005, compiling a career college football coaching record of 98–83–1. Ball was a pro personnel scouting assistant for the Kansas City Chiefs of the National Football League (NFL), a position he held from 2013 to 2020. Enshrined in the Western Illinois University Hall of Fame and the Missouri Sports Hall of Fame.

== Coaching career ==
Ball began his coaching career with Hannibal High School and Hazelwood West High School before being hired as the offensive line coach for Missouri Western and Illinois State.

Ball was the head football coach at Western Illinois University from 1990 until 1998, compiling a record of 64–41–1. When his tenure ended, he finished first at in total wins and sixth in winning percentage.

After coaching at Western Illinois, Ball was the head football coach for seven seasons at Missouri State University with a record of 34 wins and 42 losses.

== Head coaching record ==
Year	Team	Overall	Conference	Standing	Bowl/playoffs	NCAA^{#}	TSN^{°}
Western Illinois Leathernecks (Gateway Football Conference) (1990–1998)
1990	Western Illinois	3–8	3–3	T–3rd			
1991	Western Illinois	7–4–1	4–2	T–2nd	L NCAA Division I-AA First Round	14	
1992	Western Illinois	7–4	4–2	T–2nd			
1993	Western Illinois	4–7	4–2	T–2nd			
1994	Western Illinois	8–3	4–2	T–2nd			24
1995	Western Illinois	4–7	2–4	T–5th			
1996	Western Illinois	9–3	3–2	2nd	L NCAA Division I-AA First Round		13
1997	Western Illinois	11–2	6–0	1st	L NCAA Division I-AA Quarterfinal		6
1998	Western Illinois	11–3	5–1	1st	L NCAA Division I-AA Semifinal		4
Western Illinois:		64–41–1	35–18				
Southwest Missouri State / Missouri State Bears (Gateway Football Conference) (1999–2005)
1999	Southwest Missouri State	5–6	2–4	T–4th			
2000	Southwest Missouri State	5–6	2–4	T–5th			
2001	Southwest Missouri State	6–5	3–4	5th			
2002	Southwest Missouri State	4–7	1–6	8th			
2003	Southwest Missouri State	4–7	1–6	7th			
2004	Southwest Missouri State	6–5	3–4	4th			
2005	Missouri State	4–6	2–5	7th			
Southwest / Missouri State:		34–42	14–33				
Total:		98–83–1					
National championship Conference title Conference division title or championship game berth
^{#}Rankings from final NCAA Division I-AA Football Committee poll.; ^{°}Rankings from final The Sports Network poll.
