= 2003 Western Kentucky Hilltoppers football team =

American college football season

2003 Western Kentucky Hilltoppers football

NCAA Division I-AA Quarterfinal, L 17–34 at Wofford
- Conference: Gateway Football Conference

Ranking
- Sports Network: No. 7
- Record: 9–4 (5–2 Gateway)
- Head coach: David Elson (1st season)
- Offensive coordinator: T. J. Weist (1st season)
- Offensive scheme: Multiple
- Defensive coordinator: Don Martindale (1st season)
- Base defense: 3–4
- Home stadium: L. T. Smith Stadium

2003 Gateway Football Conference standings
	Conf.			Overall
Team	W		L	W		L
No. 5 Northern Iowa +^	6	–	1	10	–	3
No. 9 Southern Illinois +^	6	–	1	10	–	2
No. 6 Western Illinois ^	5	–	2	9	–	4
No. 7 Western Kentucky ^	5	–	2	9	–	4
Illinois State	3	–	4	6	–	6
Youngstown State	2	–	5	5	–	7
Southwest Missouri State	1	–	6	4	–	7
Indiana State	0	–	7	3	–	9
+ – Conference co-champions; ^ – NCAA Division I-AA playoff participant; Rankings from The Sports Network poll

The 2003 Western Kentucky Hilltoppers football team represented Western Kentucky University in the 2003 NCAA Division I-AA football season and were led by first-year head coach David Elson. Coming off winning the NCAA Division I-AA Championship the previous year, this team contended for Gateway Football Conference championship but ended up finishing tied for 3rd. They made the school's fourth straight appearance in the NCAA Division I-AA playoffs, beating Jacksonville State in the first round before losing to Wofford in the quarterfinals. The Hilltoppers finished the season ranked number 7 in final 1AA postseason national poll.

This team included future NFL players Anthony Oakley and Brian Claybourn. Matt Lange and Buster Ashley were named to the AP All American team and Justin Haddix was Gateway Conference Freshman of The Year. The All-Conference team included Ashley, Jeremy Chandler, Claybourn, Erik Dandy, Lange, Karl Maslowski, Casey Rooney, Antonio Veals, Daniel Withrow, Chad Kincaid, Oakley, and Charles Thompson.

== Schedule ==
Date	Opponent	Rank	Site	Result	Attendance	Source
August 28	Union (KY)*	No. 5	L. T. Smith Stadium; Bowling Green, KY	W 51–3	9,325	
September 6	West Virginia Tech*	No. 5	L. T. Smith Stadium; Bowling Green, KY	W 67–3	10,325	
September 20	Eastern Kentucky*	No. 3	L. T. Smith Stadium; Bowling Green, KY (Battle of the Bluegrass)	W 36–3	18,317	
September 27	at Auburn*	No. 3	Jordan–Hare Stadium; Auburn, AL	L 3–48	85,046	
October 4	at No. 2 Western Illinois	No. 6	Hanson Field; Macomb, IL	L 28–33	18,263	
October 11	Southwest Missouri State	No. 9	L. T. Smith Stadium; Bowling Green, KY	W 9–6	8,383	
October 18	at Illinois State	No. 9	Hancock Stadium; Normal, IL	W 27–24	8,945	
October 25	at Indiana State	No. 8	Memorial Stadium; Terre Haute, IN	W 59–14	3,708	
November 1	No. 3 Southern Illinois^{†}	No. 8	L. T. Smith Stadium; Bowling Green, KY	L 24–28	13,430	
November 8	No. 6 Northern Iowa	No. 12	L. T. Smith Stadium; Bowling Green, KY	W 24–3	7,518	
November 15	at Youngstown State	No. 9	Stambaugh Stadium; Youngstown, OH	W 37–13	12,858	
November 29	No. 17 Jacksonville State*	No. 9	L. T. Smith Stadium; Bowling Green, KY (NCAA Division I-AA First Round)	W 45–7	3,573	
December 6	at No. 2 Wofford*	No. 9	Gibbs Stadium; Spartanburg, SC (NCAA Division I-AA Quarterfinal)	L 17–34	7,500	
*Non-conference game; ^{†}Homecoming; Rankings from The Sports Network Poll released prior to the game
