= Jeff Rodgers =

American football coach (born 1978)

Buffalo Bills
- Title: Special teams coordinator

Personal information
- Born: January 12, 1978 (age 48); St. Paul, Minnesota, U.S.

Career information
- Position: Linebacker
- High school: Westlake (Austin, Texas)
- College: University of North Texas

Career history
- University of Arizona (2001–2002) Graduate assistant; San Francisco 49ers (2003–2007); Special teams quality control coach (2003–2004); Assistant special teams coach (2005–2007); Kansas State (2008) Special teams coordinator; Carolina Panthers (2009–2010); Special teams assistant (2009); Special teams coordinator (2010); Denver Broncos (2011–2014) Special teams coordinator; Chicago Bears (2015–2017) Special teams coordinator; Arizona Cardinals (2018–2025); Special teams coordinator (2018); Assistant head coach & special teams coordinator (2019–2025); Buffalo Bills (2026–present) Special teams coordinator

Head coaching record
- Regular season: 1–0 (1.000)

Jeff Rodgers (born January 12, 1978) is an American professional football coach who is the special teams coordinator for the Buffalo Bills of the National Football League (NFL). He previously served as assistant coach for the Arizona Cardinals, Chicago Bears, Denver Broncos, Carolina Panthers, and San Francisco 49ers.

== Early life ==
Born in St. Paul, Minnesota, Rodgers moved to Austin, Texas, with his family when his father accepted a coaching position at the University of Texas. He attended Westlake High School in Austin, the same high school attended by NFL quarterbacks Drew Brees and Nick Foles, and was schoolmates with the former. Jeff's brother, Jay, is currently the defensive line coach with the Atlanta Falcons. Rodgers played linebacker at North Texas from 1996 to 1999. It was there that he earned a degree in business, specializing in entrepreneurship and strategic management.

== Coaching career ==
=== University of Arizona ===
Rodgers started his coaching career as a graduate assistant at University of Arizona.

=== San Francisco 49ers ===
Rodgers was a special teams quality control coach from 2003–2004, before becoming assistant special teams coach in 2005, a position he held through the 2007 season.

=== Kansas State ===
In 2008, Rodgers was named the special teams coordinator at Kansas State.

=== Carolina Panthers ===
In 2009, Rodgers was hired by the Carolina Panthers as a special teams assistant. He was promoted to special teams coordinator in 2010.

=== Denver Broncos ===
Rodgers was hired by the Denver Broncos as the special teams coordinator in 2011. During his tenure with Denver, the Broncos ranked 10th in the NFL in gross punting average (45.6 yards per punt), and 11th in net punting average (39.6 yards per punt). Denver's also had six total kick return TDs (four punt/two kickoff) which was tied for the second most in the NFL during Rodgers time with the Broncos.

Additionally, under Rodgers, Broncos K Matt Prater was named to the Pro Bowl following the 2013 season after setting franchise records in field goal percentage (96.2%, 25-of-26) and points scored (150). His 64-yard field goal on December 8, 2013, was the longest FG in NFL history. In 2014, K Connor Barth's 93.8 field goal percentage (15-of-16) was second highest in Broncos single-season history.

During the Divisional Playoffs that season, Trindon Holliday became the first player in NFL history to record a punt return TD (90 yards) and kick return TD (104 yards) in a single playoff game. In 2011, Denver was third in the NFL in punt return average (12.7 ypr) and one of just three teams in the league with multiple punt return TDs: Arizona (4), Denver (2), Chicago (2). P Britton Colquitt set single-season franchise records for gross (47.4) and net punting (40.2) averages and broke his own team record the following year with a 42.1-yard net average. He worked for the Denver Broncos through the 2014 season.

=== Chicago Bears ===
On January 19, 2015, the Chicago Bears announced Rodgers as their special teams coordinator. Rodgers coached the Bears from 2015 to 2017.

The Bears had three special teams TDs in 2017 (two punt return, one fake punt), tied with the Rams for the most in the NFL. Rookie PR Tarik Cohen averaged 9.4 yards per punt return in 2017 (ninth in the NFL) and had a 61-yard return for a TD while KR Deonte Thompson ranked second in the NFL in 2016 in kick return yards (804). Sherrick McManis led the Bears in special teams tackles in each of the past three seasons (2015–17) while P Pat O'Donnell allowed just 22 punt returns in 2016, tied for the third fewest in the NFL among punters who appeared in 16 games. He was not retained after the firing of John Fox.

=== Arizona Cardinals ===
On January 26, 2018, Rodgers was hired by the Arizona Cardinals to be their special teams coordinator under head coach Steve Wilks. In 2019, Rodgers was retained by the new head coach of the Cardinals, Kliff Kingsbury. In 2020, Rodgers was promoted to assistant head coach.

On October 15, 2021, Kingsbury and several other coaching staff members tested positive for COVID-19. This resulted in Rodgers and defensive coordinator Vance Joseph taking over as co-interim head coaches for the Cardinals' week 6 game against the Cleveland Browns on October 17, 2021, and they led the Cardinals' to a 37–14 win.

=== Buffalo Bills ===
After the 2025 season, Rodgers was hired as the special teams coordinator for the Buffalo Bills on January 30, 2026.
