= 2021 Missouri State Bears football team =

American college football season

2021 Missouri State Bears football

NCAA Division I First Round, L 31–32 vs. UT Martin
- Conference: Missouri Valley Football Conference

Ranking
- STATS: No. 14
- FCS Coaches: No. 14
- Record: 8–4 (6–2 MVFC)
- Head coach: Bobby Petrino (2nd season)
- Offensive coordinator: Nick Petrino (2nd season)
- Offensive scheme: Multiple
- Defensive coordinator: Ryan Beard (2nd season)
- Base defense: 3–4
- Captains: Landon Bebee; Kevin Ellis; Titus Wall
- Home stadium: Robert W. Plaster Stadium

2021 Missouri Valley Football Conference standings
| | Conf. | | | Overall |
| Team | W | | L | W | | L |
|---|---|---|---|---|---|---|
| No. 1 North Dakota State $^ | 7 | – | 1 | 14 | – | 1 |
| No. 14 Missouri State ^ | 6 | – | 2 | 8 | – | 4 |
| No. 16 Southern Illinois ^ | 5 | – | 3 | 8 | – | 5 |
| No. 18 South Dakota ^ | 5 | – | 3 | 7 | – | 5 |
| No. 4 South Dakota State ^ | 5 | – | 3 | 11 | – | 4 |
| No. 23 Northern Iowa ^ | 4 | – | 4 | 6 | – | 6 |
| Indiana State | 3 | – | 5 | 5 | – | 6 |
| North Dakota | 3 | – | 5 | 5 | – | 6 |
| Western Illinois | 2 | – | 6 | 2 | – | 9 |
| Illinois State | 2 | – | 6 | 4 | – | 7 |
| Youngstown State | 2 | – | 6 | 3 | – | 7 |
$ – Conference champion; ^ – FCS playoff participant; Rankings from STATS Poll

The 2021 Missouri State Bears football team represented Missouri State University as a member of the Missouri Valley Football Conference (MVFC) during the 2021 NCAA Division I FCS football season. They were led by second-year head coach Bobby Petrino, the Bears compiled an overall record of 8–4 with a mark of 6–2 in conference playing, placing second in the MVFC. For the second consecutive season, Missouri State advanced to the NCAA Division I Football Championship playoffs, where the Bears lost in the first round to UT Martin. The team played home games at Robert W. Plaster Stadium in Springfield, Missouri.

The 2021 team set and matched numerous school records. Quarterback Jason Shelley broke several school records in total offense and passing yards. He broke the single season passing record, total offense in a game, total offense in a season, games with more than 200 passing yards and matched the record for passes completed in a game. Wide receiver Ty Scott set school records in receiving yards in a season, matched touchdown receptions in a season, and 100 yard receiving games in a season. Scott was also the first receiver in school history to eclipse a thousand receiving yards in a season. P Grant Burkett set school records in punting average in a game and punting average in a season.

== Schedule ==
| Date | Time | Opponent | Rank | Site | TV | Result | Attendance |
|---|---|---|---|---|---|---|---|
| September 4 | 6:00 p.m. | at Oklahoma State* | No. 24 | Boone Pickens Stadium; Stillwater, OK | ESPN+ | L 16–23 | 50,807 |
| September 11 | 7:00 p.m. | No. 19 Central Arkansas* | No. 23 | Robert W. Plaster Stadium; Springfield, MO | ESPN+ | W 43–34 | 11,247 |
| September 25 | 7:00 p.m. | South Dakota | No. 18 | Robert W. Plaster Stadium; Springfield, MO | ESPN3 | W 31–23 | 12,738 |
| October 2 | 1:00 pm | at Illinois State | No. 16 | Hancock Stadium; Normal, IL | ESPN+ | W 41–20 | N/A |
| October 9 | 1:00 p.m. | at Youngstown State | No. 16 | Stambaugh Stadium; Youngstown, OH | ESPN+ | L 33–41 | 12,444 |
| October 16 | 2:00 p.m. | Indiana State^{†} | No. 20 | Robert W. Plaster Stadium; Springfield, MO | ESPN+ | W 37–7 | 14,336 |
| October 23 | 2:30 p.m. | at No. 3 North Dakota State | No. 17 | Fargodome; Fargo, ND | ESPN+ | L 20–27 | 15,559 |
| October 30 | 2:00 p.m. | North Dakota | No. 17 | Robert W. Plaster Stadium; Springfield, MO | ESPN+ | W 32–28 | 8,372 |
| November 6 | 12:00 p.m. | at No. 7 Southern Illinois | No. 17 | Saluki Stadium; Carbondale, IL | ESPN3 | W 38–28 | 7,176 |
| November 13 | 2:00 p.m. | No. 20 Northern Iowa | No. 16 | Robert W. Plaster Stadium; Springfield, MO | ESPN+ | W 34–27 | 9,173 |
| November 20 | 8:00 p.m. | at Dixie State* | No. 14 | Greater Zion Stadium; St. George, UT | ESPN+ | W 55–24 | 2,794 |
| November 27 | 3:00 p.m. | No. 16 UT Martin* | No. 12 | Robert W. Plaster Stadium; Springfield, MO (NCAA Division I First Round) | ESPN+ | L 31–32 | 5,072 |
*Non-conference game; ^{†}Homecoming; Rankings from STATS Poll released prior to the game; All times are in Central time

== Rankings ==
Ranking movements Legend: ██ Increase in ranking ██ Decrease in ranking RV = Received votes
| | Week | | | | | | | | | | | | | |
| Poll | Pre | 1 | 2 | 3 | 4 | 5 | 6 | 7 | 8 | 9 | 10 | 11 | 12 | Final |
|---|---|---|---|---|---|---|---|---|---|---|---|---|---|---|
| STATS FCS | 24 | 23 | 17 | 18 | 16 | 16 | 20 | 17 | 17 | 17 | 16 | 14 | 12 | 14 |
| Coaches | RV | 25 | 19 | 18 | 16 | 16 | 23 | 18 | 20 | 20 | 14 | 14 | 10 | 14 |
| Athlon Power Poll | 25 | 22 | 16 | 16 | 14 | 14 | 19 | 11 | 18 | 17 | 13 | 10 | 10 | |

== Preseason ==
=== MVFC media poll ===
The Media picked the Bears to finish in sixth place.

== Game summaries ==
=== At Oklahoma State ===
Game One: No. 24 Missouri State Bears (0–0) at Oklahoma State Cowboys (0–0)

| Quarter | 1 | 2 | 3 | 4 | Total |
|---|---|---|---|---|---|
| No. 24 Missouri State | 0 | 3 | 6 | 7 | 16 |
| Oklahoma State | 6 | 14 | 0 | 3 | 23 |

at Boone Pickens Stadium • Stillwater, OK

- Date: September 4
- Game time: 6:00 p.m. CDT
- Game weather: 87 °F (31 °C), Winds N 16 mph; Sunny
- Game attendance: 50,807
- Referee: Dan Scanlan • Umpire: Rod Tucker • Linesman: George Shoup • Line judge: Steve Hoslett • Back judge: Dion Spenard • Field judge: Patrick Herron • Side judge: Joseph Martinez
- TV announcers (ESPN+): Courtney Lyle (play-by-play), Brandon Weeden (analyst) & Shane Sparks (sideline)
- Box Score

Game information

First Quarter

- (9:47) OKST – Tay Martin 5-yard pass from Shane Illingworth, PAT Failed (Drive: 9 plays, 72 yards, 3:05; OKST 6–0)

Second Quarter

- (11:38) OKST – Jaylen Warren 1-yard run, Alex Hale kick (Drive: 9 plays, 66 yards, 3:28; OKST 13–0)
- (10:57) OKST – L.D. Brown 1-yard run, Alex Hale kick (Drive: 2 plays, 25 yards, 0:29; OKST 20–0)
- (1:51) MSU – Jose Pizano 30-yard field goal (Drive: 10 plays, 51 yards, 4:23; OKST 20–3)

Third Quarter

- (7:27) MSU – Jose Pizano 48-yard field goal (Drive: 6 plays, 12 yards, 1:30; OKST 20–6)
- (1:15) MSU – Jose Pizano 33-yard field goal (Drive: 10 plays, 45 yards, 4:11; OKST 20–9)

Fourth Quarter

- (13:05) OKST – Alex Hale 35-yard field goal (Drive: 4 plays, -7 yards, 0:49; OKST 23–9)
- (3:06) MSU – Ty Scott 8-yard pass from Jason Shelly, Jose Pizano kick (Drive: 11 plays, 84 yards, 4:06; OKST 23–16)

| Statistics | MSU | OSU |
|---|---|---|
| First downs | 23 | 16 |
| Total yards | 336 | 369 |
| Rushes/yards | 37/102 | 28/54 |
| Passing yards | 234 | 315 |
| Passing: Comp–Att–Int | 24-46-0 | 22-40-1 |
| Time of possession | 35:30 | 24:30 |

| Team | Category | Player | Statistics |
|---|---|---|---|
| Missouri State | Passing | Jason Shelley | 23/44, 235 yards, 1 TD |
| Missouri State | Rushing | Kevon Latulas | 6 carries, 45 yards |
| Missouri State | Receiving | Xavier Lane | 8 receptions, 78 yards |
| Oklahoma State | Passing | Shane Illingworth | 22/40, 315 yards, 1 TD, 1 INT |
| Oklahoma State | Rushing | L.D. Brown | 15 carries, 30 yards, 1 TD |
| Oklahoma State | Receiving | Tay Martin | 6 receptions, 107 yards, 1 TD |

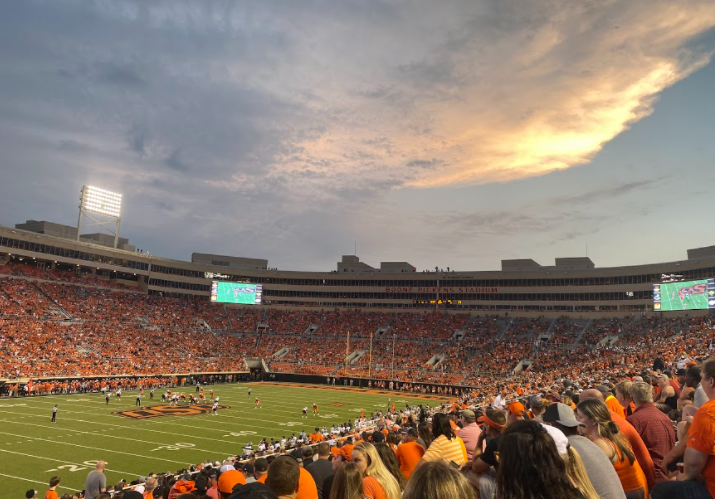
Missouri State at Oklahoma State in 2021

Oklahoma State

Missouri State

Game One Uniforms

=== No. 19 Central Arkansas ===
Game Two: No. 19 Central Arkansas Bears (0–1) at No. 23 Missouri State Bears (0–1)

| Quarter | 1 | 2 | 3 | 4 | Total |
|---|---|---|---|---|---|
| No. 19 Central Arkansas | 0 | 14 | 0 | 20 | 34 |
| No. 23 Missouri State | 7 | 10 | 6 | 20 | 43 |

at Robert W. Plaster Stadium • Springfield, MO

- Date: Saturday, September 11, 2021
- Game time: 7:05 p.m. CDT
- Game weather: 88 °F (31 °C), Winds S 10 mph; Sunny
- Game attendance: 11,247
- Referee: Rick Warne • Umpire: Steve Flanagan • Linesman: Matthew Banks • Line judge: Grant Henderson • Back judge: Devin Aller • Field judge: Austin Hills • Side judge: Harlan Bizzell
- TV announcers (ESPN+): Don West, Correy Riggs
- Box Score

Game information

First Quarter

- (04:13) MSU - Tobias Little 2 yard run, Jose Pizano kick (Drive: 8 plays, 85 yards, 3:42; MSU 0-7)

Second Quarter

- (09:51) UCA - Sam Camargo 4 yard pass from Breylin Smith, Hayden Ray kick (Drive: 12 plays, 56 yards, 5:09; TIED 7-7)
- (07:23) MSU - Jason Shelley 16 yard run, Jose Pizano kick (Drive: 5 plays, 60 yards, 2:28; MSU 7-14)
- (04:32) UCA - Darius Hale 1 yard run, Hayden Ray kick (Drive: 7 plays, 61 yards, 2:46; TIED 14-14)
- (00:20) MSU - Jose Pizano 39 yard field goal (Drive: 10 plays, 53 yards, 4:12; MSU 14-17)

Third Quarter

- (07:34) MSU - Jose Pizano 35 yard field gold (Drive: 15 plays, 57 yards, 7:26; MSU 14-20)
- (01:10) MSU - Jose Pizano 36 yard field goal (Drive: 9 plays, 49 yards, 3:47; MSU 14-23)

Fourth Quarter

- (13:04) UCA - Darius Hale 3 yard run, Hayden Ray kick (Drive: 7 plays, 30 yards, 2:55; MSU 21-23)
- (03:17) UCA - Trysten Smith 3 yard run, 2 pt. conversion failed (Drive: 3 plays, 97 yards, 0:58; UCA 27-23)
- (03:05) MSU - Montrae Braswell 96 yard kickoff return, Jose Pizano kick (MSU 27-30)
- (02:15) UCA - Tyler Hudson 71 yard pass from Breylin Smith, Hayden Ray kick (Drive: 2 plays, 75 yards, 0:51; UCA 34-30)
- (00:29) MSU - Xavier Lane 26 yard pass from Jason Shelley, Jose Pizano kick (Drive: 7 plays, 69 yards, 1:37; MSU 34-37)
- (00:00) MSU - Tylar Wiltz 45 yard interception return (MSU 34-43)

| Statistics | UCA | MSU |
|---|---|---|
| First downs | 22 | 24 |
| Total yards | 453 | 378 |
| Rushes/yards | 29/ 121 | 34/ 147 |
| Passing yards | 332 | 231 |
| Passing: Comp–Att–Int | 25-38-2 | 18-36-0 |
| Time of possession | 27:43 | 32:17 |

| Team | Category | Player | Statistics |
|---|---|---|---|
| Central Arkansas | Passing | Breylin Smith | 25/38, 332 yards, 2 TD, 2 INT |
| Central Arkansas | Rushing | Trysten Smith | 8 carries, 79 yards, 1 TD |
| Central Arkansas | Receiving | Lujuan Winningham | 10 catches, 144 yards |
| Missouri State | Passing | Jason Shelley | 18/36, 231 yards, 1 TD |
| Missouri State | Rushing | Kevon Latulas | 10 carries, 98 yards |
| Missouri State | Receiving | Xavier Lane | 9 catches, 148 yards, 1 TD |

Missouri State

Central Arkansas

Game Two Uniforms

=== South Dakota ===
Game Three: South Dakota Coyotes (2–1) at No. 18 Missouri State Bears (1–1)

| Quarter | 1 | 2 | 3 | 4 | Total |
|---|---|---|---|---|---|
| South Dakota | 14 | 9 | 0 | 0 | 23 |
| No. 18 Missouri State | 7 | 7 | 3 | 14 | 31 |

at Robert W. Plaster Stadium • Springfield, MO

- Date: Saturday, September 25, 2021
- Game time: 7:05 p.m. CDT
- Game weather: 71 °F (22 °C), Winds N NE 1 mph; Clear and Cool
- Game attendance: 12738
- Referee: Aaron Adams • Umpire: Keith Wohlers • Linesman: John Winter • Line judge: Scott Landy • Back judge: Kurt Dingmann • Field judge: Brad Brunet • Side judge: Leanne Surmin
- TV announcers (ESPN3): Scott Warmann, Danan Hughes, Kelly Burke
- Box Score

Game information

First Quarter

- (12:19) USD - Travis Theis 8 yard run, Mason Lorber kick (Drive: 1 play, 21 yards, 00:08; USD 0-7)
- (09:28) USD - Kody Case 21 yard pass from Carson Camp, Mason Lorber kick (Drive: 1 play, 21 yards, 00:08; USD 0-14)
- (05:38) MSU - Jason Shelley 26 yard run, Jose Pizano kick (Drive: 7 plays, 75 yards, 03:50; MSU 7-14)

Second Quarter

- (01:52) MSU - Ty Scott 46 yard pass from Jason Shelley, Jose Pizano kick (Drive: 1 play, 46 yards, 00:08; TIED 14-14)
- (01:38) USD - Wesley Eliodor 99 yard kickoff return, Mason Lorber kick blocked (USD 20-14)
- (00:00) USD - Mason Lorber 27 yard field goal (Drive: 7 plays, 66 yards, 1:05; USD 23-14)

Third Quarter

- (10:21) MSU - Jose Pizano 42 yard field goal (Drive: 9 plays, 49 yards, 4:31; USD 23-17)

Fourth Quarter

- (13:02) MSU - Kevon Latulas 3 yard pass from Jason Shelley, Jose Pizano kick (Drive: 12 plays, 74 yards, 6:19; MSU 23-24)
- (04:42) MSU - Jason Shelley 12 yard run, Jose Pizano kick (Drive: 4 plays, 27 yards, 1:34; MSU 23-31)

| Statistics | USD | MSU |
|---|---|---|
| First downs | 14 | 22 |
| Total yards | 361 | 439 |
| Rushes/yards | 33/ 130 | 46/ 158 |
| Passing yards | 231 | 281 |
| Passing: Comp–Att–Int | 12-29-2 | 19-29-0 |
| Time of possession | 24:11 | 35:49 |

| Team | Category | Player | Statistics |
|---|---|---|---|
| South Dakota | Passing | Carson Camp | 12/29, 231 yards, 1 TD, 2 INT |
| South Dakota | Rushing | Nate Thomas | 4 carries, 60 yards |
| South Dakota | Receiving | Carter Bell | 3 catches, 102 yards |
| Missouri State | Passing | Jason Shelley | 19/29, 281 yards, 2 TD |
| Missouri State | Rushing | Tobias Little | 14 carries, 71 yards |
| Missouri State | Receiving | Ty Scott | 7 catches, 111 yards, 1 TD |

Missouri State

South Dakota

Game Three Uniforms

=== At Illinois State ===
Game Four: No. 16 Missouri State Bears (2–1) at Illinois State Redbirds (2–2)

| Quarter | 1 | 2 | 3 | 4 | Total |
|---|---|---|---|---|---|
| No. 16 Missouri State | 7 | 14 | 13 | 7 | 41 |
| Illinois State | 13 | 7 | 0 | 0 | 20 |

at Hancock Stadium • Normal, IL

- Date: Saturday, October 2, 2021
- Game time: 1:05 p.m. CDT
- Game weather: 74 °F (23 °C), Winds SW 9 mph; Cloudy
- Game attendance: N/A
- Referee: Matt Packowski • Umpire: Adam McClurg • Linesman: Kevin Moss • Line judge: AJ Haduch • Back judge: Cleo Miller • Field judge: Marcus Cameron • Side judge: Jen Berke
- TV announcers (ESPN+): Kurt Pegler, and Chris Highland
- Box score

Game information

First Quarter

- (11:09) MSU - Jordan Murray 22 yard pass from Jason Shelley, Jose Pizano kick (Drive: 8 plays, 75 yards, 03:51; MSU 0-7)
- (07:26) ISU - Mitchell Lewis 7 yard pass from Jackson Waring, PAT Failed (Drive: 7 plays, 81 yards, 03:36; MSU 6-7)
- (02:26) ISU - Bryson Deming 23 yard pass from Jackson Waring, Aidan Bresnahan kick (Drive: 5 plays, 82 yards, 02:48; ISU 13-7)

Second Quarter

- (08:57) MSU - Tobias Little 2 yard run, Jose Pizano kick (Drive: 9 plays, 77 yards, 04:12; MSU 13-14)
- (08:43) ISU - Jabari Khepera 75 yard pass from Jackson Waring, Aidan Bresnahan kick (Drive: 1 play, 75 yards, 00:14; ISU 20-14)
- (03:16) MSU - Tobias Little 2 yard run, Jose Pizano kick (Drive: 10 plays, 58 yards, 05:22; MSU 20-21)

Third Quarter

- (08:43) MSU - Tobias Little 5 yard run, PAT Failed (Drive: 5 plays, 40 yards, 02:20; MSU 20-27)
- (07:11) MSU - Montrae Braswell 46 yard interception return, Jose Pizano kick (MSU 20-34')

Fourth Quarter

- (05:06) MSU - Kevon Latulas 69 yard pass from Jason Shelley, Jose Pizano kick (Drive: 6 plays, 94yards, 03:00; MSU 20-41)

| Statistics | MSU | ISU |
|---|---|---|
| First downs | 26 | 17 |
| Total yards | 513 | 358 |
| Rushes/yards | 38/194 | 31/40 |
| Passing yards | 319 | 318 |
| Passing: Comp–Att–Int | 19-27-1 | 19-30-3 |
| Time of possession | 30:50 | 28:26 |

| Team | Category | Player | Statistics |
|---|---|---|---|
| Missouri State | Passing | Jason Shelley | 19/27, 319 yards, 2 TD, 1 INT |
| Missouri State | Rushing | Tobias Little | 14 carries, 91 yards, 3 TD |
| Missouri State | Receiving | Jordan Murray | 5 catches, 85 yards, 1 TD |
| Illinois State | Passing | Jackson Waring | 19/30, 318 yards, 3 TD, 3 INT |
| Illinois State | Rushing | Pha'leak Brown | 7 carries, 27 yards |
| Illinois State | Receiving | Jabari Khepera | 5 catches, 107 yards, 1 TD |

Illinois State

Missouri State

Game Four Uniforms

=== At Youngstown State ===
Game Five: #16 Missouri State Bears (3–1) at Youngstown State Penguins (1–3)

| Quarter | 1 | 2 | 3 | 4 | Total |
|---|---|---|---|---|---|
| No. 16 Missouri State | 0 | 3 | 7 | 23 | 33 |
| Youngstown State | 6 | 11 | 3 | 21 | 41 |

at Stambaugh Stadium • Youngstown, OH

- Date: Saturday, October 9, 2021
- Game time: 1:00 p.m. CDT
- Game weather: 64 °F (18 °C), Winds W 10 mph; Sunny
- Game attendance: 12,444
- Referee: Art Brown • Umpire: Joel Schult • Linesman: Frank Spryszak • Line judge: Brett Carpenter • Back judge: Chris Curry • Field judge: Marcus Cameron • Side judge: Jared Flesch
- TV announcers (ESPN+): Drae Smith and Chris Sammarone
- Box Score

Game information

First Quarter

- (12:28) YSU - Samuel St. Surin 28 yard pass from Demeatric Crenshaw, PAT failed (Drive: 2 plays, 44 yards, 00:36; YSU 6-0)

Second Quarter

- (10:56) YSU - Colt McFadden 45 yard field goal (Drive: 13 plays, 72 yards, 05:47; YSU 9-0)
- (07:06) MSU - Jose Pizano 36 yard field goal (Drive: 9 plays, 56 yards, 03:50; YSU 9-3)
- (00:12) YSU - Jorge Portorreal 8 yard pass from Demeatric Crenshaw, 2pt conversion good (Drive: 11 plays, 66 yards, 03:53; YSU 17-3)

Third Quarter

- (11:47) MSU - Ty Scott 21 yard pass from Jason Shelley, Jose Pizano kick (Drive: 7 plays, 82 yards, 03:08; YSU 17-10)
- (03:16) YSU - Colt McFadden 28 yard field goal (Drive: 10 plays, 56 yards, 05:51; YSU 20-10)

Fourth Quarter

- (10:02) MSU - Jose Pizano 32 yard field goal (Drive: 8 plays, 65 yards, 02:43; YSU 20-13)
- (04:38) MSU - Ron Tiavaasue 7 yard pass from Jason Shelley, Jose Pizano kick (Drive: 11 plays, 71 yards, 03:58; TIED 20-20)
- (04:17) YSU - Jaleel McLaughlin 22 yard run, Colt McFadden kick (Drive: 1 play, 22 yards, 00:06; YSU 27-20)
- (02:08) YSU - Jaleel McLaughlin 60 yard run, Colt McFadden kick (Drive: 2 plays, 75 yards, 00:49; YSU 34-20)
- (01:06) MSU - Ty Scott 27 yard pass from Jason Shelley, Jose Pizano kick (Drives: 6 plays, 68 yards, 00:56 YSU 34-27)
- (00:40) YSU - Demeatric Crenshaw 73 yard run, Colt McFadden kick (Drive: 3 plays, 80 yards, 00:24; YSU 41-27)
- (00:00) MSU - Cairo Payne 12 yard pass from Jason Shelley, No PAT (Drive: 6 plays, 75 yards, 00:40; YSU 41-33)

| Statistics | MSU | YSU |
|---|---|---|
| First downs | 30 | 21 |
| Total yards | 503 | 476 |
| Rushes/yards | 27/131 | 50/377 |
| Passing yards | 372 | 99 |
| Passing: Comp–Att–Int | 27-49-2 | 10-19-0 |
| Time of possession | 26:47 | 33:13 |

| Team | Category | Player | Statistics |
|---|---|---|---|
| Missouri State | Passing | Jason Shelley | 27/48, 372 yards, 4 TD, 2 INT |
| Missouri State | Rushing | Jason Shelley | 11 carries, 93 yards |
| Missouri State | Receiving | Ty Scott | 8 catches, 121 yards, 2 TD |
| Youngstown State | Passing | Demeatric Crenshaw | 10/19, 99 yards, 2 TD |
| Youngstown State | Rushing | Demeatric Crenshaw | 22 carries, 202 yards, 1 TD |
| Youngstown State | Receiving | Samuel St. Surin | 2 catches, 39 yards, 1 TD |

Youngstown State

Missouri State

Game Five Uniforms

=== Indiana State ===
Game Six: Indiana State Sycamores (3–3) at No. 20 Missouri State Bears (3–2)

| Quarter | 1 | 2 | 3 | 4 | Total |
|---|---|---|---|---|---|
| Indiana State | 0 | 0 | 0 | 7 | 7 |
| No. 20 Missouri State | 3 | 21 | 10 | 3 | 37 |

at Robert W. Plaster Stadium • Springfield, MO

- Date: Saturday, October 16, 2021
- Game time: 2:05 p.m. CDT
- Game weather: 63 °F (17 °C), Winds NW 14 mph; Sunny
- Game attendance: 14336
- Referee: Rick Warne • Umpire: Steve Flanagan • Linesman: Matthew Banks • Line judge: Grant Henderson • Back judge: Devin Aller • Field judge: Phil Ayeni • Side judge: Harlan Bizzell
- TV announcers (ESPN+): Don West and Corey Riggs
- Box Score

Game information

First Quarter

- (06:16) MSU - Jose Pizano 38 yard field goal (Drive: 12 plays, 59 yards, 6:08; MSU 3-0)

Second Quarter

- (02:19) MSU - Xavier Lane 45 yard pass from Jason Shelley, Jose Pizano kick (Drive: 6 plays, 68 yards, 03:17; MSU 10-0)
- (01:18) MSU - Jason Shelley 3 yard run, Jose Pizano kick (Drive: 3 plays, 24 yards, 00:52; MSU 17-0)
- (00:40) MSU - Ty Scott 26 yard pass from Jason Shelley, Jose Pizano kick (Drive: 2 plays, 35 yards, 00:31; MSU 24-0)

Third Quarter

- (09:18) MSU - Ty Scott 59 yard pass from Jason Shelley, Jose Pizano kick (Drive: 4 plays, 80 yards, 02:03; MSU 31-0)
- (04:02) MSU - Jose Pizano 33 yard field goal (Drive: 7 plays, 57 yards, 02:58; MSU 34-0)

Fourth Quarter

- (11:31) MSU - Jose Pizano 35 yard field goal (Drive: 12 plays, 67 yards, 05:44; MSU 37-0)
- (06:08) ISU - Dante Hendrix 19 yard pass from Anthony Thompson, Alan Selzer kick (Drive: 12 plays, 75 yards, 05:23; MSU 37-7)

| Statistics | ISU | MSU |
|---|---|---|
| First downs | 15 | 21 |
| Total yards | 177 | 442 |
| Rushes/yards | 24/84 | 45/190 |
| Passing yards | 177 | 252 |
| Passing: Comp–Att–Int | 18-33-1 | 13-25-1 |
| Time of possession | 24:56 | 35:04 |

| Team | Category | Player | Statistics |
|---|---|---|---|
| Indiana State | Passing | Anthony Thompson | 18/31, 177 yards, 1 TD, 1 INT |
| Indiana State | Rushing | Peterson Kerlegrand | 16 carries, 73 yards |
| Indiana State | Receiving | Dante Hendrix | 10 catches, 121 yards, 1 TD |
| Missouri State | Passing | Jason Shelley | 11/21, 225 yards, 3 TD |
| Missouri State | Rushing | Tobias Little | 9 carries, 55 yards |
| Missouri State | Receiving | Ty Scott | 3 catches, 106 yards, 2 TD |

Missouri State

Indiana State

Game Six Uniforms

=== At No. 3 North Dakota State ===
Game Seven: No. 17 Missouri State Bears (4–2) at No. 3 North Dakota State Bison (6–0)

| Quarter | 1 | 2 | 3 | 4 | Total |
|---|---|---|---|---|---|
| No. 17 Missouri State | 10 | 3 | 7 | 0 | 20 |
| No. 3 North Dakota State | 0 | 10 | 3 | 14 | 27 |

at Fargodome • Fargo, ND

- Date: Saturday, October 23, 2021
- Game time: 2:30 p.m. CDT
- Game weather: 70 °F (21 °C), Winds none; Indoor
- Game attendance: 15,559
- Referee: Andrew Speciale • Umpire: Scott Jones • Linesman: Frank Bullock • Line judge: Mike Lowenberg • Back judge: Damon Wilcox • Field judge: Paul Winglewich • Side judge: Ken Cloud
- TV announcers (ESPN+): Dom Izzo and Kyle Emanuel
- Box score

Game information

First Quarter

- (12:56) MSU - Jose Pizano 47 yard field goal (Drive: 4 plays, 7 yards, 1:55; MSU 0-3)
- (09:07) MSU - Tobias Little 11 yard run, Jose Pizano kick (Drive: 3 plays, 61 yards, 1:28; MSU 0-10)

Second Quarter

- (12:09) NDSU - Quincy Patterson 15 yard run, Jake Reinholz kick (Drive: 1 play, 15 yards, 0:07; NDSU 7-10)
- (01:13) MSU - Jose Pizano 25 yard field goal (Drive: 11 plays, 84 yards, 5:44; MSU 7-13)
- (00:00) NDSU - Jake Reinholz 46 yard field goal (Drive: 9 plays, 42 yards, 1:09; MSU 10-13)

Third Quarter

- (12:20) NDSU - Jake Reinholz 41 yard field goal (Drive: 5 plays, 52 yards, 2:40; TIED 13-13)
- (09:08) MSU - Tobias Little 5 yard run, Jose Pizano kick (Drive: 6 plays, 75 yards, 3:06; MSU 13-20)

Fourth Quarter

- (13:40) NDSU - Phoenix Sproles 29 yard pass from Cam Miller, Jake Reinholz kick (Drive: 4 plays, 59 yards, 1:37; TIED 20-20)
- (04:57) NDSU - Christian Watson 24 yard pass from Cam Miller, Jake Reinholz kick (Drive: 12 plays, 62 yards, 7:06; NDSU 27-20)

| Statistics | MSU | NDSU |
|---|---|---|
| First downs | 15 | 16 |
| Total yards | 321 | 333 |
| Rushes/yards | 32/79 | 35/144 |
| Passing yards | 242 | 189 |
| Passing: Comp–Att–Int | 16-25-1 | 12-26-1 |
| Time of possession | 30:57 | 29:03 |

| Team | Category | Player | Statistics |
|---|---|---|---|
| Missouri State | Passing | Jason Shelley | 16/25, 242 yards, 1 INT |
| Missouri State | Rushing | Tobias Little | 9 carries, 41 yards, 2 TD |
| Missouri State | Receiving | Ty Scott | 6 catches, 104 yards |
| North Dakota State | Passing | Cam Miller | 7/9, 112 yards, 2 TD |
| North Dakota State | Rushing | Quincy Patterson | 6 carries, 57 yards, 1 TD |
| North Dakota State | Receiving | Christian Watson | 4 catches, 106 yards, 1 TD |

North Dakota State

Missouri State

Game Seven Uniforms

=== North Dakota ===
Game Eight: North Dakota Fighting Hawks (3–4) at No. 17 Missouri State Bears (4–3)

| Quarter | 1 | 2 | 3 | 4 | Total |
|---|---|---|---|---|---|
| North Dakota | 0 | 7 | 14 | 7 | 28 |
| No. 17 Missouri State | 7 | 3 | 7 | 15 | 32 |

at Robert W. Plaster Stadium • Springfield, MO

- Date: Saturday, October 30, 2021
- Game time: 2:00 p.m. CDT
- Game weather: 57 °F (14 °C), Winds NW 7 mph; Sunny
- Game attendance: 8,372
- Referee: Matt Packowski • Umpire: Adam McClurg • Linesman: Todd Skaggs • Line judge: AJ Haduch • Back judge: Martin Birr • Field judge: Phil Ayeni • Side judge: Travis Evans
- TV announcers (ESPN+): Don West and Dan Lucy
- Box Score

Game information

First Quarter

- (08:25) MSU - Tyrone Scott 6 yard pass from Jason Shelley, Jose Pizano kick (Drive: 13 plays, 75 yards, 06:35; MSU 7-0)

Second Quarter

- (02:21) UND - Adam Zavalney 21 yard pass from Quincy Vaughn, Brady Stevens kick (Drive: 11 plays, 63 yards, 05:22; TIED 7-7)
- (00:36) MSU - Jose Pizano 27 yard field goal (Drive: 10 plays, 55 yards, 01:45; MSU 10-7)

Third Quarter

- (11:12) UND - Otis Weah 3 yard run, Brady Stevens kick (Drive: 8 plays, 73 yards, 03:41; UND 10-14)
- (08:46) MSU - Jordan Murray 20 yard pass from Jason Shelley, Jose Pizano kick (Drive: 6 plays, 75 yards, 02:26; MSU 17-14)
- (06:26) UND - Otis Weah 1 yard run, Brady Stevens kick (Drive: 5 plays, 65 yards, 02:20 UND 17-21)

Fourth Quarter

- (13:16) UND - Otis Weah 11 yard run, Brady Stevens kick (Drive: 8 plays, 78 yards, 03:50; UND 17-28)
- (04:33) MSU - Jason Shelley 12 yard run, 2 PT Conversion good Xavier Lane pass (Drive: 6 plays, 63 yards, 02:03; UND 25-28)
- (00:15) MSU - Isaac Smith 2 yard pass from Jason Shelley, Jose Pizano kick (Drive: 8 plays, 76 yards, 01:24; MSU 32-28)

| Statistics | UND | MSU |
|---|---|---|
| First downs | 23 | 26 |
| Total yards | 441 | 468 |
| Rushes/yards | 41/256 | 25/119 |
| Passing yards | 185 | 349 |
| Passing: Comp–Att–Int | 14-23-1 | 29-42-1 |
| Time of possession | 32:48 | 27:12 |

| Team | Category | Player | Statistics |
|---|---|---|---|
| North Dakota | Passing | Tommy Schuster | 13/21, 164 yards, 1 INT |
| North Dakota | Rushing | Otis Weah | 21 carries, 165 yards, 3 TD |
| North Dakota | Receiving | Adam Zavainey | 2 catches, 54 yards, 1 TD |
| Missouri State | Passing | Jason Shelley | 29/42, 349 yards, 3 TD, 1 INT |
| Missouri State | Rushing | Tobias Little | 15 carries, 112 yards |
| Missouri State | Receiving | Tyrone Scott | 10 catches, 147 yards, 1 TD |

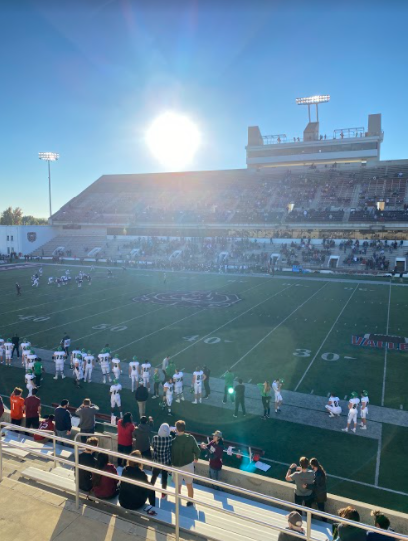
View of the Plaster Stadium West side during the 2021 North Dakota game.

Missouri State

North Dakota

Game Eight Uniforms

=== At No. 7 Southern Illinois ===
Game Nine: No. 17 Missouri State Bears (5–3) at No. 7 Southern Illinois Salukis (6–2)

| Quarter | 1 | 2 | 3 | 4 | Total |
|---|---|---|---|---|---|
| No. 17 Missouri State | 10 | 0 | 7 | 21 | 38 |
| No. 7 Southern Illinois | 7 | 6 | 0 | 15 | 28 |

at Saluki Stadium • Carbondale, IL

- Date: Saturday, November 6, 2021
- Game time: 12:00 p.m. CDT
- Game weather: 65 °F (18 °C); Sunny
- Game attendance: 7,176
- Referee: Art Brown • Umpire: Joel Schult • Linesman: Frank Spryszak • Line judge: Brett Carpenter • Back judge: Cleo Miller • Field judge: Marcus Cameron • Side judge: Jared Flesch
- TV announcers (ESPN+): Scott Warmann and Danan Hughes
- Box Score

Game information

First Quarter

- (09:48) MSU - Jason Shelley 20 yard run, Jose Pizano kick (Drive: 10 plays, 82 yards, 05:09; MSU 0-7)
- (08:37) SIU - Nic Baker 17 yard run, Nico Gualdoni kick (Drive: 1 play, 17 yards, 00:05; TIED 7-7)
- (00:45) MSU - Jose Pizano 51 yard field goal (Drive: 10 plays, 35 yards, 05:37; MSU 7-10)

Second Quarter

- (12:24) SIU - Nico Gualdoni 50 yard field goal (Drive: 9 plays, 42 yards, 02:36; TIED 10-10)
- (00:01) SIU - Nico Gualdoni 55 yard field goal (Drive: 4 plays, 21 yards, 00:17; SIU 13-7)

Third Quarter

- (03:14) MSU - Jason Shelley 14 yard run, Jose Pizano kick (Drive: 11 plays, 58 yards, 04:37; MSU 13-17)

Fourth Quarter

- (14:27) MSU - Tobias Little 1 yard run, Jose Pizano kick (Drive: 8 plays, 65 yards, 02:12; MSU 13-24)
- (12:03) MSU - Kevon Latulas 87 yard run, Jose Pizano kick (Drive: 2 plays, 96 yards,00:47; MSU 13-31)
- (10:26) SIU - Izaiah Hartrup 19 yard pass from Nic Baker, Nico Gualdoni kick (Drive: 8 plays, 75 yards, 01:37; MSU 20-31)
- (06:37) MSU - Ty Scott, 31 yard pass from Jason Shelley, Jose Pizano kick (Drive: 4 plays, 35 yards, 01:39; MSU 20-38)
- (04:06) SIU - Tyce Daniel 11 yard pass from Nic Baker, 2 PT Conversion Good, Izaiah Hartrup rush (Drive: 8 plays, 76 yards, 02:24; MSU 28-38)

| Statistics | MSU | SIU |
|---|---|---|
| First downs | 26 | 18 |
| Total yards | 480 | 298 |
| Rushes/yards | 53/237 | 31/36 |
| Passing yards | 243 | 262 |
| Passing: Comp–Att–Int | 16-29-1 | 21-39-0 |
| Time of possession | 37:00 | 27:14 |

| Team | Category | Player | Statistics |
|---|---|---|---|
| Missouri State | Passing | Jason Shelley | 16/29, 243 yards, 1 TD, 1 INT |
| Missouri State | Rushing | Kevon Latulas | 7 carries, 105 yards, 1 TD |
| Missouri State | Receiving | Ty Scott | 5 catches, 83 yards, 1 TD |
| Southern Illinois | Passing | Nic Baker | 21/38, 262 yards, 3 TD |
| Southern Illinois | Rushing | Donovan Spencer | 11/19, 15 yards |
| Southern Illinois | Receiving | Landon Lenoir | 7 catches, 100 yards |

Southern Illinois

Missouri State

Game Nine Uniforms

=== No. 20 Northern Iowa ===
Game Ten: No. 20 Northern Iowa Panthers (5–4) at No. 16 Missouri State Bears (6–3)

| Quarter | 1 | 2 | 3 | 4 | Total |
|---|---|---|---|---|---|
| No. 20 Northern Iowa | 3 | 3 | 7 | 14 | 27 |
| No. 16 Missouri State | 6 | 7 | 7 | 14 | 34 |

at Robert W. Plaster Stadium • Springfield, MO

- Date: Saturday, November 13, 2021
- Game time: 2:05 p.m. CDT
- Game weather: 45 °F (7 °C), Winds W 7 mph; Sunny
- Game attendance: 9,173
- Referee: Aaron Adams • Umpire: Keith Wohlers • Linesman: Gordon Hanson • Line judge: Scott Lively • Back judge: Kurt Dingmann • Field judge: Brad Brunet • Side judge: Leanne Surmin
- TV announcers (ESPN+): Don West and Corey Riggs
- Box Score

Game information

First Quarter

- (10:14) MSU - Jose Pizano 30 yard field goal (Drive: 6 plays, 18 yards, 02:44; MSU 3-0)
- (04:55) UNI - Matthew Cook 27 yard field goal (Drive: 9 plays, 66 yards, 05:11; TIED 3-3)
- (01:03) MSU - Jose Pizano38 yard field goal (Drive: 9 plays, 35 yards, 03:44; MSU 6-3)

Second Quarter

- (12:54) UNI - Matthew Cook 47 yard field goal (Drive: 7 plays, 45 yards, 03:09; TIED 6-6)
- (05:21) MSU - Tobias Little 1 yard run, Jose Pizano kick (Drive: 13 plays, 75 yards, 07:33; MSU 13-6)

Third Quarter

- (12:44) MSU - Jason Shelley 3 yard run, Jose Pizano Kick (Drive: 4 plays, 75 yards, 0:10; MSU 20-6)
- (06:10) UNI - Tyler Hoosman 2 yard run, Matthew Cook kick (Drive: 12 plays, 73 yards, 06:25; MSU 20-13)

Fourth Quarter

- (13:01) MSU - Jason Shelley 8 yard run, Jose Pizano kick (Drive: 9 plays, 80 yards, 03:54; MSU 27-13)
- (05:11) UNI - Deion McShane 8 yard pass from Theo Day, Matthew Cook kick (Drive: 8 plays, 77 yards, 02:02; MSU 27-20)
- (02:14) UNI - Deion McShane 18 yard pass from Theo Day, Matthew Cook, kick (Drive: 5 plays, 32 yards, 01:41; TIED 27-27)
- (00:58) MSU - Naveon Mitchell 55 yard pass from Jason Shelley, Jose Pizano kick (Drive: 4 plays, 75 yards, 01:16; MSU 34-27)

| Statistics | UNI | MSU |
|---|---|---|
| First downs | 22 | 18 |
| Total yards | 360 | 379 |
| Rushes/yards | 33/122 | 32/59 |
| Passing yards | 238 | 320 |
| Passing: Comp–Att–Int | 17-30-2 | 22-30-0 |
| Time of possession | 29:28 | 30:32 |

| Team | Category | Player | Statistics |
|---|---|---|---|
| Northern Iowa | Passing | Theo Day | 17/30, 238 yards, 2 TD, 2 INT |
| Northern Iowa | Rushing | Dom Williams | 16 carries, 83 yards |
| Northern Iowa | Receiving | Deion McShane | 6 catches, 86 yards, 2 TD |
| Missouri State | Passing | Jason Shelley | 22/33, 320 yards, 1 TD |
| Missouri State | Rushing | Tobias Little | 10 carries, 34 yards |
| Missouri State | Receiving | Naveon Mitchell | 3 catches, 74 yards, 1 TD |

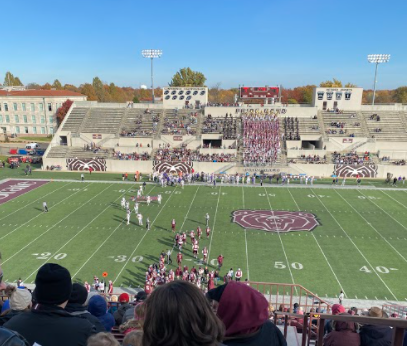
View from the West side during the game against Northern Iowa in 2021.

Missouri State

Northern Iowa

Game Ten Uniforms

=== At Dixie State ===
Game Eleven: No. 14 Missouri State Bears (7–3) at Dixie State Trailblazers (1–9)

| Quarter | 1 | 2 | 3 | 4 | Total |
|---|---|---|---|---|---|
| No. 14 Missouri State | 3 | 24 | 14 | 14 | 55 |
| Dixie State | 3 | 0 | 7 | 14 | 24 |

at Greater Zion Stadium • St. George, UT

- Date: Saturday, November 20, 2021
- Game time: 8:00 p.m. CDT
- Game weather: 57 °F (14 °C), Breezy; Clear, crisp
- Game attendance: 2,794
- Referee: Marcus Thorton • Umpire: Scott Johnson • Linesman: Jeremy Jolles • Line judge: Keith Laurant • Back judge: Joe Wise • Field judge: Tom Drzazgowski • Side judge: Patrick Herron
- TV announcers (ESPN+): Devin Dixon and Andy Thompson
- Box Score

Game information

First Quarter

- (13:01) MSU - Jose Pizano 39 yard field goal (Drive: 6 plays, 53 yards, 1:59; MSU 0-3)
- (08:18) DSU - Connor Brooksby 45 yard field goal (Drive: 12 plays, 47 yards, 4:43; TIED 3-3)

Second Quarter

- (12:38) MSU - Tobias Little 7 yard run, Jose Pizano kick (Drive: 13 plays, 70 yards, 5:03; MSU 3-10)
- (09:58) MSU - Jose Pizano 25 yard field goal (Drive: 5 plays, 63 yards, 1:20; MSU 3-13)
- (08:18) MSU - Kevon Latulas 68 yard run, Jose Pizano kick (Drive: 1 play, 68 yards, 0:14; MSU 3-20)
- (06:50) MSU - Kevon Latulas 7 yard run, Jose Pizano kick (Drive: 3 plays, 50 yards, 0:34; MSU 3-27)

Third Quarter

- (06:18) MSU - Jason Shelley 12 yard run, Jose Pizano kick (Drive: 9 plays, 68 yards, 4:57; MSU 3-34)
- (05:57) MSU - Lemondre Joe 38 yard interception return, Jose Pizano kick (MSU 3-41)
- (01:41) DSU - Kobe Tracy 4 yard run, Andrew Day kick (Drive: 9 plays, 75 yards, 4:16; MSU 10-41)

Fourth Quarter

- (06:32) DSU - Cade Veach 13 yard pass from Kobe Tracy, Andrew Day kick (Drive: 12 plays, 92 yards, 3:30; MSU 17-48)
- (03:19) DSU - Devyn Perkins 95 yard interception return, Andrew Day kick (MSU 24-48)
- (03:14) MSU - Steven Ward 57 yard kickoff return, Jose Pizano kick (MSU 24-55)

| Statistics | MSU | DSU |
|---|---|---|
| First downs | 26 | 21 |
| Total yards | 574 | 382 |
| Rushes/yards | 36/297 | 36/75 |
| Passing yards | 277 | 307 |
| Passing: Comp–Att–Int | 15-29-1 | 24-49-1 |
| Time of possession | 28:50 | 31:10 |

| Team | Category | Player | Statistics |
|---|---|---|---|
| Missouri State | Passing | Jason Shelley | 13/24, 251 yards, 1 TD |
| Missouri State | Rushing | Kevon Latulas | 8 carries, 162 yards, 2 TD |
| Missouri State | Receiving | Ty Scott | 8 catches, 174 yards |
| Dixie State | Passing | Kobe Tracy | 24/49, 307 yards, 1 TD, 1 INT |
| Dixie State | Rushing | Drew Kannely-Robles | 22 carries, 78 yards |
| Dixie State | Receiving | Keith Davis | 7 catches, 146 yards |

Dixie State

Missouri State

Game Eleven Uniforms

=== No. 16 UT Martin—NCAA Division I First Round ===
Game Twelve: No. 16 UT Martin Skyhawks (10–1) at No. 12 Missouri State Bears (8–3)

| Quarter | 1 | 2 | 3 | 4 | Total |
|---|---|---|---|---|---|
| No. 16 UT Martin | 3 | 16 | 7 | 6 | 32 |
| No. 12 Missouri State | 7 | 10 | 14 | 0 | 31 |

at Robert W. Plaster Stadium • Springfield, MO

- Date: Saturday, November 27, 2021
- Game time: 3:00 p.m. CDT
- Game weather: 63 °F (17 °C), Winds W 11mph, Sunny
- Game attendance: 5,072
- Referee: Todd Boyd
- TV announcers (ESPN+): Connor Onion and Barrett Brooks

Game information

First Quarter

- (4:15) UTM - Tyler Larco 33 yard field goal (Drive: 9 plays, 58 yards, 3:53; UTM 0-3)
- (2:17) MSU - Ron Tiavaasue 4 yard pass from Jason Shelley, Jose Pizano kick (Drive: 4 plays, 75 yards, 1:58; MSU 7-3)

Second Quarter

- (14:48) UTM - Zoe Roberts 6 yard pass from Dresser Winn, PAT FAILED (Drive: 3 plays, 5 yards, 1:02; UTM 7-9)
- (07:14) MSU - Tobias Little 2 yard run, Jose Pizano kick (Drive: 10 plays, 40 yards, 4:06; MSU 14-9)
- (01:52) UTM - Peyton Logan 14 yard run, Tyler Larco kick (Drive: 6 plays, 61 yards, 3:04; UTM 14-16)
- (00:55) UTM - Tyler Larco 26 yard field goal (Drive: 5 plays, 27 yards, 0:51; UTM 14-19)
- (00:00) MSU - Jose Pizano 47 yard field goal (Drive: 5 plays, 16 yards, 0:28; UTM 17-19)

Third Quarter

- (05:48) MSU - Kevon Latulas 4 yard pass from Jason Shelley, Jose Pizano kick (Drive: 6 plays, 75 yards, 2:45; MSU 24-19)
- (03:15) UTM - Zak Wallace, 14 yard run, Tyler Larco kick (Drive: 6 plays, 88 yards, 2:27; UTM 24-26)
- (00:18) MSU - Xavier Lane 29 yard pass from Jason Shelley, Jose Pizano kick (Drive: 7 plays, 67 yards, 2:55; MSU 31-26)

Fourth Quarter

- (03:36) UTM - Donnel Williams 37 yard pass from Dresser Winn, 2 Pt. Conversion FAILED (Drive: 1 plays, 37 yards, 0:08; UTM 31-32)

| Statistics | UTM | MSU |
|---|---|---|
| First downs | 19 | 17 |
| Total yards | 361 | 398 |
| Rushes/yards | 35/89 | 30/119 |
| Passing yards | 272 | 279 |
| Passing: Comp–Att–Int | 22-43-1 | 22-42-3 |
| Time of possession | 31:44 | 28:16 |

| Team | Category | Player | Statistics |
|---|---|---|---|
| UT Martin | Passing | Dresser Winn | 23/43, 272 yards, 2 TD, INT |
| UT Martin | Rushing | Peyton Logan | 12 carries, 68 yards, TD |
| UT Martin | Receiving | Donnel Williams | 7 receptions, 178 yards, TD |
| Missouri State | Passing | Jason Shelley | 22/42, 279 yards, 3 TD, 3 INT |
| Missouri State | Rushing | Jason Shelley | 13 carries, 93 yards |
| Missouri State | Receiving | Xavier Lane | 7 receptions, 110 yards, TD |

Missouri State

UT Martin

Game Ten Uniforms

== Awards and honors ==
=== Regular season ===
Missouri Valley weekly awards

In 2021, the Bears broke the program record of 11 conference weekly awards with 14 honors. QB Jason Shelley paced the team with 5 awards across "Valley Offensive Player of the Week" (2) and "Valley Newcomer of the Week" (3). WR Xavier Lane was the other Bears player to receive multiple awards; winning 1 as the "Valley Offensive Player of the Week" and 1 as the "Valley Newcomer of the Week". OT Landon Bebee was the lone selection as "Valley Offensive Lineman of the Week" while LB Ferrin Manulelua was the only player to be selected as "Valley Defensive Player of the Week". Missouri State had had 3 players chosen as "Special Teams Players of the Week" LB Steven Ward, CB Montrae Braswell, and K Jose Pizano. RB Tobias Little was the other "Valley Offensive Player of the Week", and RB Kevon Latulas won his award as "Newcomer of the Week".

Defensive Player of the Week
| Player | Position | Date | Ref. |
|---|---|---|---|
| Ferrin Manulelelua | LB | October 31, 2021 | |

Newcomer of the Week
| Player | Position | Date | Ref. |
|---|---|---|---|
| Jason Shelley | QB | September 5, 2021 | |
| Xavier Lane | WR | September 12, 2021 | |
| Jason Shelley | QB | September 26, 2021 | |
| Jason Shelley | QB | October 31, 2021 | |
| Kevon Latulas | RB | November 1, 2021 | |

Offensive Player of the Week
| Player | Position | Date | Ref. |
|---|---|---|---|
| Xavier Lane | WR | September 12, 2021 | |
| Tobias Little | RB | October 3, 2021 | |
| Jason Shelley | QB | October 31, 2021 | |
| Jason Shelley | QB | November 14, 2021 | |

Offensive Lineman of the Week
| Player | Position | Date | Ref. |
|---|---|---|---|
| Landon Bebee | OT | October 4, 2021 | |

Special Teams Player of the Week
| Player | Position | Date | Ref. |
|---|---|---|---|
| Montrae Braswell | CB | September 12, 2021 | |
| Steven Ward | LB | October 17, 2021 | |
| Jose Pizano | K | November 1, 2021 | |

=== Postseason ===
Missouri Valley Football Conference

Newcomer of the Year
| Player | Position | Date | Ref. |
|---|---|---|---|
| Jason Shelley | QB | November 24, 2021 | |

Offensive Player of the Year
| Player | Position | Date | Ref. |
|---|---|---|---|
| Jason Shelley | QB | November 24, 2021 | |

== Personnel ==
=== Coaching staff ===
Bobby Petrino's coaching staff remained the same from 2020. Ryan Beard remained with the Bears as the defensive coordinator and Nick Petrino stayed on as the offensive coordinator and quarterbacks coach. Petrino received a pay raise following the successful 2020 season. Other members of the coaching staff such as Beard, Nick Petrino, defensive line coach L. D. Scott, and running backs coach Ronnie Fouch.

| Name | Position | Alma mater | Joined staff |
|---|---|---|---|
| Bobby Petrino | Head coach | Carroll College (1983) | 2020 |
| Ryan Beard | Defensive coordinator/ Safeties | Western Kentucky (2012) | 2020 |
| Nick Petrino | Offense coordinator / quarterbacks coach | Western Kentucky (2014) | 2020 |
| Austin Appleby | Wide receivers coach | Purdue (2015) | 2020 |
| Skyler Cassity | Inside linebackers coach | Auburn (2016) | 2020 |
| Nelson Fishback | Tight ends coach/ co-special teams coordinator | Western Kentucky (2015) | 2020 |
| Ronnie Fouch | Running backs coach/ recruiting coordinator/ co-special teams coordinator | Indiana State (2004) | 2020 |
| Max Halpin | Offensive line coach | Western Kentucky (2016) | 2020 |
| Reggie Johnson | Inside Linebackers | Louisville (1996) | 2020 |
| L.D. Scott | Defensive line coach/ run game coordinator | Louisville (2009) | 2020 |
| Tramain Thomas | Defensive backs coach | Arkansas (2013) | 2020 |
| Lynn Mentzer | Director of football operations | Coastal Carolina (2005) | 2018 |

=== Roster ===
2021 Missouri State Bears Football Roster
| Quarterback: 3 Jason Shelley – junior (5'11, 197); 8 Jaden Johnson – (redshirt) Sophomore (6'2, 216); 10 Jake Van Dyne – (redshirt) Freshman (6'3, 193); 11 Hess Horne – freshman (6'2, 183); Running back: 0 Tobias Little – senior (6'0, 230); 4 Andrew Cunningham – sophomore (6'1, 200); 5 Kevon Latulas – junior (6'0, 200); 14 Myron Mason – junior (5'8, 200); 23 Tywuan Lee – freshman (6'2, 200); 31 Celdon Manning – freshman (5'10, 180); 32 Brandon Benjamin – freshman (5'9, 200); Wide receiver: 1 Xavier Lane – senior (6'4, 210); 6 Cairo Payne – sophomore (5'11, 175); 9 Jordan Murray – junior (6'4, 233); 15 Jahod Booker – junior (5'11, 185); 16 Damoriea Vick – junior (6'3, 213); 18 Terique Owens – junior (6'3, 193); 19 Ty Scott – junior (6'3, 200); 28 Myles Shaw – (redshirt) freshman (5'9, 178); 80 Isaiah Allred – senior (6'3, 214); 81 Jakael Jackson – (redshirt) freshman (6'1, 191); 82 Davin Simms – freshman (6'0, 195); 83 Michael Alphin – freshman (5'10, 175); 84 DVontae Key – sophomore (5'10, 175); 86 Marquis Yarbrough – (redshirt) junior (5'11, 185); 88 Hunter Wood – sophomore (6'1, 205); Tight end: 2 Ron Tiavaasue – senior (6'3, 270); 49 Carson Buddemeyer – sophomore (6'2, 241); 87 Gary Clinton – freshman (6'2, 241); 89 Isaac Smith – senior (6'7, 259); Punter: 31 Grant Burkett – sophomore (6'1, 180) | Offensive lineman: 50 Paul Sogialofa – junior (6'5, 342); 53 Jeremiah Carter – junior (6'6, 315); 56 Ryan Suliafu – sophomore (6'2, 340); 57 Naveli Dixson − Freshman (6'3, 314); 60 Sean Fitzgerald – senior (6'2, 301); 62 Ethan Barnett – sophomore (6'7, 300); 63 Stingray Miller – junior (6'7, 290); 65 Ian Fitzgerald – sophomore (6'5, 291); 66 Grant Goodson – (redshirt) freshman (6'6, 288); 67 Remy Bilodeau – junior (6'3, 295); 72 Mark Hutchinson – (redshirt) freshman (6'2, 302); 73 Landon Bebee – junior (6'3, 297); 74 Mike Fangman – (redshirt) freshman (6'2, 288); 75 Kendrick Davis – senior (6'3, 310); 76 Jake Swope – sophomore (6'7, 284); 77 Clayton Ingram – sophomore (6'6, 308); 79 Brett Harris – freshman (6'6, 295); Defensive lineman: 15 Kevin Ellis – DE – senior (6'4, 244); 33 Anthony Payne – DE – senior (6'2, 282); 43 Caleb Dietlin – DE – freshman (6'3, 241); 44 Siale Suliafu – DL – freshman (6'0, 295); 47 Devin Goree – DE – sophomore (6'3, 243); 90 Sterling Smithson – DL – freshman (6'3, 314); 91 Ja'Veo Toliver – DE – (redshirt) freshman (6'5, 290); 93 Eric Johnson – DL – senior (6'5, 298); 94 Ikenna Ahumibe – DT – junior (6'0, 299); 95 Jalen Williams – DE – sophomore (6'4, 242); 96 Armon Wallace – DL – freshman (6'0, 289); 98 Arian Bhat – DL – junior (6'2, 290); 99 Allen Love – DL – junior (6'2, 295); Long snapper: 61 Caden Bolz – sophomore (6'0, 240) | Linebacker: 3 Dimitri Moore – senior (6'3, 232); 5 Ferrin Manuleleua – senior (6'1, 230); 10 Tylar Wiltz – senior (6'1, 219); 21 Steven Ward – freshman (6'0, 215); 24 Trae Thompson – junior (6'1, 250); 26 Tahj Chambers – sophomore (6'2, 198); 27 Udoka Ezeani – freshman (6'2, 203); 36 Jordan Hoskins – freshman (6'0, 215); 46 Ethan Mackowski – (redshirt) freshman (6'3, 225); 48 Tyler Lovelace – senior (6'2, 213); 52 Bryan Ulrich – (redshirt) freshman (6'0, 211); 54 Von Young – sophomore (6'0, 226); 58 Logan Decker – (redshirt) sophomore (6'1, 218); 59 Lucas Eastman – sophomore (6'3, 234); Cornerback: 0 Kaunor Ashley – sophomore (5'10, 185); 1 Zack Sanders – senior (6'0, 196); 4 Montrae Braswell – junior (6'0, 190); 11 Javian Smith – junior (6'3, 189); 17 Nick Hessefort – junior (6'2, 196); 20 Donovan Clark – (redshirt) freshman (6'2, 193); 22 Lemondre Joe – freshman (6'0, 172); 41 Cole Bowen – (redshirt) freshman (5'10, 178); Safety: 6 Kyriq McDonald – senior (6'0, 209); 7 Titus Wall – senior (6'0, 202); 9 Mikey Miles – sophomore (6'2, 192); 12 P.J. Hall – (redshirt) freshman (6'3, 200); 13 Todric McGee – freshman (6'1, 196); 29 Dwight Jacobs Jr. – sophomore (5'10, 193); 39 Brock Carter – junior (5'11, 191); Placekicker: 37 Spencer Grosz – sophomore (5'11, 173); 38 Jose Pizano – junior (5'7, 218) |

=== Recruiting ===
The Bears signed 11 freshman for the 2021 class. They added four players from the state including late addition Kaden McMullen who was the best QB in Missouri and number 5 in the 2021 class according to ESPN. Other highlights include TE Gary Clinton who was 29 overall and the 3rd best TE in Missouri, 3 star QB Hess Horne from Alabama, 3 star OL Brett Harris from Kansas City, and 2 star DL Sterling Smithson from Kansas.

College recruiting
| Name | Hometown | School | Height | Weight | Commit date |
|---|---|---|---|---|---|
| Kaden McMullen; QB | O'Fallon, MO | Christian High School | 6 ft 3 in (1.91 m) | 190 lb (86 kg) | Jul 29, 2021 |
| Kaden McMullen; QB | Recruit ratings: Scout: 247Sports: ESPN: (80) | | | | |
| Gary Clinton; TE | Webb City, MO | Webb City High School | 6 ft 4 in (1.93 m) | 220 lb (100 kg) | Feb 4, 2021 |
| Gary Clinton; TE | Recruit ratings: Scout: Rivals: 247Sports: ESPN: (71) | | | | |
| Hess Horne; QB | Eufaula, AL | Eufaula High School | 6 ft 2 in (1.88 m) | 165 lb (75 kg) | Jan 12, 2021 |
| Hess Horne; QB | Recruit ratings: 247Sports: | | | | |
| Brett Harris; OL | Kansas City, MO | Rockhurst High School | 6 ft 6 in (1.98 m) | 285 lb (129 kg) | Dec 5, 2020 |
| Brett Harris; OL | Recruit ratings: 247Sports: | | | | |
| Sterling Smithson; DL | Stilwell, KS | Blue Valley High School | 6 ft 4 in (1.93 m) | 305 lb (138 kg) | Feb 4, 2021 |
| Sterling Smithson; DL | Recruit ratings: 247Sports: | | | | |
| Naveli Dixson; OL | Lakeland, FL | Lakeland High School | 6 ft 4 in (1.93 m) | 310 lb (140 kg) | Dec 17, 2021 |
| Naveli Dixson; OL | Recruit ratings: No ratings found | | | | |
| Udoka Ezeani; LB | Richmond, TX | Foster High School | 6 ft 2 in (1.88 m) | 207 lb (94 kg) | Dec 16, 2020 |
| Udoka Ezeani; LB | Recruit ratings: No ratings found | | | | |
| Jordan Hoskins; LB | Detroit, MI | West Bloomfield High School | 6 ft 0 in (1.83 m) | 205 lb (93 kg) | Dec 16, 2021 |
| Jordan Hoskins; LB | Recruit ratings: No ratings found | | | | |
| Mark Hutchinson; OL | Hayward, CA | Pittsburg High School | 6 ft 2 in (1.88 m) | 280 lb (130 kg) | Dec 16, 2021 |
| Mark Hutchinson; OL | Recruit ratings: No ratings found | | | | |
| Tywuan Lee; RB | Hillirard, FL | Hilliard High School | 6 ft 2 in (1.88 m) | 200 lb (91 kg) | Dec 16, 2021 |
| Tywuan Lee; RB | Recruit ratings: No ratings found | | | | |
| Todric McGee; DB | Wichita, KS | Wichita Northwest High School | 6 ft 1 in (1.85 m) | 195 lb (88 kg) | Dec 16, 2021 |
| Todric McGee; DB | Recruit ratings: No ratings found | | | | |
| Davin Simms; WR | Wichita, KS | Andover Central High School | 6 ft 0 in (1.83 m) | 180 lb (82 kg) | Dec 16, 2021 |
| Davin Simms; WR | Recruit ratings: No ratings found | | | | |
| Siale Suliafu; DL | Riverside, CA | St. Bernard High School | 6 ft 0 in (1.83 m) | 279 lb (127 kg) | Dec 16, 2021 |
| Siale Suliafu; DL | Recruit ratings: No ratings found | | | | |
| Steven Ward; LB | Nixa, MO | Nixa High School | 6 ft 1 in (1.85 m) | 205 lb (93 kg) | Dec 12, 2021 |
| Steven Ward; LB | Recruit ratings: No ratings found | | | | |
Overall recruit ranking:
Note: In many cases, Scout, Rivals, 247Sports, On3, and ESPN may conflict in their listings of height and weight.; In these cases, the average was taken. ESPN grades are on a 100-point scale.; Sources: "ESPN commits". ESPN.; "2021 Team Ranking". Rivals.com.

=== Transfers ===
Incoming

Missouri State brought in 18 transfers in the 2021 class, who were eligible to play right away. Several players have started right away on offense like Junior QB Jason Shelley from Utah State, Senior OL Sean Fitzgerald from Coastal Carolina, Sophomore WR Ty Scott from Central Michigan, and RS Senior WR Xavier Lane from Western Kentucky. Defensively, Senior LB Dimitri Moore from Vanderbilt, Freshman DB Donovan Clark from Boise State, and Junior CB Javian Smith have all made impacts.

| Name | No. | Pos. | Height | Weight | Year | Hometown | Prev. school |
|---|---|---|---|---|---|---|---|
| Andrew Cunningham | TBA | RB | 6'1 | 215 | Sophomore | Tampa, Florida | Iowa Central CC |
| Kendrick Davis | TBA | OL | 6'4 | 300 | Senior | West Bend, Wisconsin | Fort Hays State |
| Sean Fitzgerald | TBA | OL | 6'2 | 290 | Senior | Mount Pleasant, Michigan | Coastal Carolina |
| Nick Gallo | TBA | OG | 6'3 | 285 | Sophomore | Lewisville, Texas | Independence CC |
| Ryan Suliafu | TBA | OL | 6'0 | 279 | Sophomore | Riverside, California | Riverside CC |
| Jason Shelley | TBA | QB | 5'11 | 190 | Junior | Frisco, Texas | Utah State |
| Ty Scott | TBA | WR | 6'3 | 194 | Sophomore | Estill, South Carolina | Central Michigan |
| Dimitri Moore | TBA | LB | 6'3 | 234 | Senior | Cedar Hill, Texas | Vanderbilt |
| Terique Owens | TBA | WR | 6'3 | 180 | RS Sophomore | Pleasanton, California | Florida Atlantic |
| Xavier Lane | TBA | WR | 6'4 | 205 | RS Senior | Montgomery, Alabama | Western Kentucky |
| Naveon Mitchell | TBA | RB | 5'10 | 175 | RS Freshman | Richmond, Texas | New Mexico State |
| Donovan Clark | TBA | DB | 6'2 | 194 | Freshman | Tacoma, Washington | Boise State |
| Javian Smith | TBA | CB | 6'3 | 193 | Junior | Richmond, Texas | Houston |
| Jahod Booker | TBA | WR | 5'11 | 182 | RS Junior | Montgomery, Alabama | Alabama State |
| Clayton Ingram | TBA | OL | 6'0 | 270 | RS Freshman | Concord, California | Northern Arizona |
| Trae Thompson | TBA | LB | 6'1 | 235 | Sophomore | Tulsa, Oklahoma | Northeastern Oklahoma CC |
| Jaylen Stewart | TBA | DB | 6'3 | 190 | Somphomore | Texarkana, Texas | El Camino College |
| Jeremiah Carter | TBA | OL | 6'6 | 313 | Sophomore | Bear, Delaware | Lackawanna College |
