= 2003 Western Illinois Leathernecks football team =

American college football season

2003 Western Illinois Leathernecks football

NCAA Division I-AA Quarterfinal, L 27–28 at Colgate
- Conference: Gateway Football Conference

Ranking
- Sports Network: No. 6
- Record: 9–4 (5–2 Gateway)
- Head coach: Don Patterson (5th season)
- Offensive coordinator: Mark Hendrickson (5th season)
- Home stadium: Hanson Field

2003 Gateway Football Conference standings
	Conf.			Overall
Team	W		L	W		L
No. 5 Northern Iowa +^	6	–	1	10	–	3
No. 9 Southern Illinois +^	6	–	1	10	–	2
No. 6 Western Illinois ^	5	–	2	9	–	4
No. 7 Western Kentucky ^	5	–	2	9	–	4
Illinois State	3	–	4	6	–	6
Youngstown State	2	–	5	5	–	7
Southwest Missouri State	1	–	6	4	–	7
Indiana State	0	–	7	3	–	9
+ – Conference co-champions; ^ – NCAA Division I-AA playoff participant; Rankings from The Sports Network poll

The 2003 Western Illinois Leathernecks football team represented Western Illinois University as a member of the Gateway Football Conference during the 2003 NCAA Division I-AA football season. They were led by fifth-year head coach Don Patterson and played their home games at Hanson Field. The Leathernecks finished the season with an 9–4 record overall and a 5–2 record in conference play. The team received an at-large bid to the NCAA Division I-AA Football Championship playoffs, where they defeated Montana in the first round and lost to Colgate in the second round. The team was ranked No. 6 in The Sports Network's postseason ranking of Division I-AA.

== Schedule ==
Date	Opponent	Rank	Site	Result	Attendance	Source
August 28	Wayne State*	No. 3	Hanson Field; Macomb, IL	W 35–3	12,174	
September 4	at Eastern Michigan*	No. 4	Rynearson Stadium; Ypsilanti, MI	W 34–12	11,123	
September 13	at LSU*	No. 1	Tiger Stadium; Baton Rouge, LA	L 7–35	87,164	
September 20	Tennessee–Martin*	No. 2	Hanson Field; Macomb, IL	W 56–0	11,887	
October 4	No. 5 Western Kentucky	No. 2	Hanson Field; Macomb, IL	W 33–28	18,263	
October 11	at Youngstown State	No. 2	Stambaugh Stadium; Youngstown, OH	W 54–20	14,218	
October 18	No. 7 Southern Illinois	No. 2	Hanson Field; Macomb, IL	L 32–37	19,287	
October 25	No. 9 Northern Iowa	No. 7	Hanson Field; Macomb, IL	L 30–38	8,302	
November 1	at Illinois State	No. 13	Hancock Stadium; Normal, IL	W 24–20	8,415	
November 8	at Indiana State	No. 11	Memorial Stadium; Terre Haute, IN	W 34–28	2,001	
November 15	Southwest Missouri State	No. 10	Hanson Field; Macomb, IL	W 63–42	7,513	
November 29	at Montana*	No. 10	Washington–Grizzly Stadium; Missoula, MT (NCAA Division I-AA First Round)	W 43–40 ^{2OT}	16,222	
December 6	at Colgate*	No. 10	Andy Kerr Stadium; Hamilton, NY (NCAA Division I-AA Quarterfinal)	L 27–28	5,287	
*Non-conference game; Rankings from The Sports Network Poll released prior to the game
