= 2003 Illinois State Redbirds football team =

American college football season

2003 Illinois State Redbirds football
- Conference: Gateway Football Conference
- Record: 6–6 (3–4 Gateway)
- Head coach: Denver Johnson (4th season)
- MVPs: Sha-Ron Edwards; Boomer Grigsby
- Captains: Jim Ferguson; Boomer Grigsby; Andrew Papoccia; Ray Robinson; Mike Souza
- Home stadium: Hancock Stadium

2003 Gateway Football Conference standings
	Conf.			Overall
Team	W		L	W		L
No. 5 Northern Iowa +^	6	–	1	10	–	3
No. 9 Southern Illinois +^	6	–	1	10	–	2
No. 6 Western Illinois ^	5	–	2	9	–	4
No. 7 Western Kentucky ^	5	–	2	9	–	4
Illinois State	3	–	4	6	–	6
Youngstown State	2	–	5	5	–	7
Southwest Missouri State	1	–	6	4	–	7
Indiana State	0	–	7	3	–	9
+ – Conference co-champions; ^ – NCAA Division I-AA playoff participant; Rankings from The Sports Network poll

The 2003 Illinois State Redbirds football team represented Illinois State University as a member of the Gateway Football Conference during the 2003 NCAA Division I-AA football season. Led by fourth-year head coach Denver Johnson, the Redbirds compiled an overall record of 4–7 with a mark of 2–5 in conference play, placing sixth in the Gateway. Illinois State played home games at Hancock Stadium in Normal, Illinois.

== Schedule ==
Date	Opponent	Rank	Site	Result	Attendance	Source
August 28	Drake*		Hancock Stadium; Normal, IL	W 27–13	7,157	
September 6	at Illinois*		Memorial Stadium; Champaign, IL	L 22–49	56,304	
September 13	Truman State*		Hancock Stadium; Normal, IL	W 49–6	7,339	
September 20	at No. 19 Eastern Illinois*		O'Brien Stadium; Charleston, IL (rivalry)	W 21–14	6,318	
September 27	Florida Atlantic*	No. 23	Hancock Stadium; Normal, IL	L 10–28	6,837	
October 4	No. 16 Northern Iowa		Hancock Stadium; Normal, IL	L 7–16	12,026	
October 11	at No. 8 Southern Illinois		McAndrew Stadium; Carbondale, IL	L 17–45	13,247	
October 18	No. 9 Western Kentucky^{†}		Hancock Stadium; Normal, IL	L 24–27	8,945	
October 25	at Youngstown State		Stambaugh Stadium; Youngstown, OH	W 35–25	17,179	
November 1	No. 13 Western Illinois		Hancock Stadium; Normal, IL	L 20–24	8,415	
November 8	at Southwest Missouri State		Plaster Sports Complex; Springfield, MO	W 48–43	2,898	
November 15	Indiana State		Hancock Stadium; Normal, IL	W 38–3	5,491	
*Non-conference game; ^{†}Homecoming; Rankings from The Sports Network Poll released prior to the game
