= 2003 Southwest Missouri State Bears football team =

American college football season

2003 Southwest Missouri State Bears football
- Conference: Gateway Football Conference
- Record: 4–7 (1–6 GFC)
- Head coach: Randy Ball (5th season)
- Offensive coordinator: Donny Simmons (1st season)
- Defensive coordinator: Deion Melvin (5th season)
- Captains: Darryl Robinson; Kailan Williams; Brad Durham; Nate Schurman
- Home stadium: Plaster Sports Complex

2003 Gateway Football Conference standings
	Conf.			Overall
Team	W		L	W		L
No. 5 Northern Iowa +^	6	–	1	10	–	3
No. 9 Southern Illinois +^	6	–	1	10	–	2
No. 6 Western Illinois ^	5	–	2	9	–	4
No. 7 Western Kentucky ^	5	–	2	9	–	4
Illinois State	3	–	4	6	–	6
Youngstown State	2	–	5	5	–	7
Southwest Missouri State	1	–	6	4	–	7
Indiana State	0	–	7	3	–	9
+ – Conference co-champions; ^ – NCAA Division I-AA playoff participant; Rankings from The Sports Network poll

The 2003 Southwest Missouri State Bears football team represented Southwest Missouri State University (now known as Missouri State University) as a member of the Gateway Football Conference (GFC) during the 2003 NCAA Division I-AA football season. Led by fifth-year head coach Randy Ball, the Bears compiled an overall record of 4–7, with a mark of 1–6 in conference play, and finished seventh in the GFC.

== Schedule ==
Date	Opponent	Site	Result	Attendance	Source
August 28	East Central*	Plaster Sports Complex; Springfield, MO	W 48–0	11,362	
September 13	at Oklahoma State*	Boone Pickens Stadium; Stillwater, OK	L 3–42	42,152	
September 20	at Southeast Missouri State*	Houck Stadium; Cape Girardeau, MO	W 17–10		
September 27	Bacone*	Plaster Sports Complex; Springfield, MO	W 51–14	12,607	
October 4	at Youngstown State	Stambaugh Stadium; Youngstown, OH	L 7–34		
October 11	at No. 9 Western Kentucky	L. T. Smith Stadium; Bowling Green, KY	L 6–9	8,383	
October 18	No. 11 Northern Iowa	Plaster Sports Complex; Springfield, MO	L 20–26	14,911	
October 25	at No. 4 Southern Illinois	McAndrew Stadium; Carbondale, IL	L 6–20	8,873	
November 1	Indiana State	Plaster Sports Complex; Springfield, MO	W 45–10	5,017	
November 8	Illinois State	Plaster Sports Complex; Springfield, MO	L 43–48	2,898	
November 15	at No. 10 Western Illinois	Hanson Field; Macomb, IL	L 42–63	7,513	
*Non-conference game; Rankings from The Sports Network Poll released prior to the game
