= Jay Rodgers =

American football player and coach (born 1976)

New Orleans Saints
- Title: Edges coach

Personal information
- Born: August 29, 1976 (age 50); Saint Paul, Minnesota, U.S.

Career information
- Position: Quarterback
- High school: Austin (TX) Westlake
- College: Indiana (1996–1998); Missouri State (1999)

Career history
- Ohio State (2000) Recruiting assistant; LSU (2001–2002) Graduate assistant; Dodge City (2003) Passing game coordinator & quarterbacks coach; Missouri State (2004) Quarterbacks coach; Stephen F. Austin (2005–2006) Quarterbacks coach; Iowa State (2007–2008) Wide receivers coach; Denver Broncos (2009–2014); Coaches assistant (2009-2010); Defensive quality control coach (2011); Defensive line coach (2012-2014); Chicago Bears (2015–2020) Defensive line coach; Los Angeles Chargers (2021–2023); Outside linebackers coach & run game coordinator (2021); Defensive line coach & run game coordinator (2022-2023); Atlanta Falcons (2024) Defensive line coach; New Orleans Saints (2025–present) Edges coach

Awards and highlights
- John Teerlinck Award (2018)

Jay Rodgers (born August 29, 1976) is an American football coach and former quarterback who currently serves as the edges coach for the New Orleans Saints of the National Football League (NFL) . He also served as the defensive line coach and run game coordinator for the Los Angeles Chargers and defensive line coach of the Chicago Bears from 2015 to 2020 and the Denver Broncos from 2012 to 2014.

== Playing career ==
Rodgers attended Indiana University Bloomington, where he played quarterback for the Indiana Hoosiers football team from 1996 to 1998. He started 15 games in total for the Hoosiers. In 1999, he transferred to Missouri State. He was named the team MVP for Missouri State after setting several single-season passing records during the 1999 season.

== Coaching career ==
=== Denver Broncos ===
After spending 2009–2011 as an assistant coach, Rodgers was promoted to defensive line coach following former coach Wayne Nunnely's retirement after three years with the Broncos. In 2012, the Broncos went 13–3 and won the AFC West for the second year in a row. They would go on to lose in the Divisional round to the Baltimore Ravens 38–35. Under Rodgers' coaching, defensive end Elvis Dumervil made the Pro Bowl.

During the 2013 offseason, the Broncos drafted defensive lineman Sylvester Williams and Quanterus Smith in the 1st (28th pick) and 5th (146th pick) rounds of the 2013 NFL draft. In 2013 the Broncos went 13–3 again and won the AFC West for the third consecutive year. They would go on to Super Bowl XLVIII and lost to the Seattle Seahawks 43–8.

Prior to the 2014 season, the Broncos signed defensive end DeMarcus Ware. That year, the Broncos went 12–4 and won the AFC West for the fourth time. They would go on to lose in the Divisional Round against the Indianapolis Colts 24–13. Ware would make the Pro Bowl under Rodgers' tutelage. After this season, head coach John Fox was fired and his staff was laid off.

=== Chicago Bears ===
On January 25, 2015, the Chicago Bears named Rodgers the defensive line coach, reuniting with Fox who had been named their head coach. In his first season with the Bears, they went 6–10 and missed the playoffs, though nose tackle Eddie Goldman made the 2015 All-Rookie team.

During the 2016 offseason, the Bears drafted defensive end Jonathan Bullard in the third round (72nd pick) of the 2016 NFL draft and added Roy Robertson-Harris as an undrafted free agent. They also re-signed Mitch Unrein and added Akiem Hicks, but let Jarvis Jenkins go to the New York Jets. During the 2016 season, the Bears went 3–13, the franchise's worst record since the NFL expanded to 16 games.

During the 2017 season, the Bears went 5–11, missed the playoffs, and Fox was fired. After Matt Nagy was named the new head coach of the Bears, he elected to keep defensive coordinator Vic Fangio and his staff. In the 2018 NFL draft, the Bears drafted defensive lineman Bilal Nichols and Kylie Fitts in the 5th (145th pick) and 6th (181st pick) respectively. In 2018, the Bears went 12–4, the first winning season since 2012 and playoff appearance since 2010. Under Rodgers, defensive end Akiem Hicks made the 2019 Pro Bowl, the first defensive end from the Bears to do so since Julius Peppers in 2012. Rodgers received the John Teerlinck Award as the best defensive line coach in the NFL; the 2018 Bears line helped the defense lead the league in categories like rushing yards allowed per game (80) and points allowed per game (17.7).

During the 2019 offseason, Fangio left the Bears to become the head coach of the Denver Broncos and he was replaced by former Indianapolis head coach Chuck Pagano. Robertson-Harris was also re-signed.

=== Los Angeles Chargers ===
On January 20, 2021, Rodgers was hired by the Los Angeles Chargers to serve as the outside linebackers coach, as well as the run game coordinator. On December 15, 2023, after the firings of head coach Brandon Staley and general manager Tom Telesco, Rodgers was also fired by the Chargers.

=== Atlanta Falcons ===
He served as the defensive line coach for the Atlanta Falcons for the 2024 season. On January 11, 2025, Rodgers was fired by the Atlanta Falcons after spending one season as the team's defensive line coach.

== Personal life ==
His brother Jeff is also an NFL coach; the two worked together on the Bears with Jeff as special teams coordinator until 2017. Their father Randy Rodgers was a college coach and recruiting coordinator for the Texas Longhorns and Illinois Fighting Illini.
