= Jordan Murray (American football) =

American football player (born 2000)

Profile
- Position: Tight end

Personal information
- Born: April 20, 2000 (age 26); Kansas City, Missouri, U.S.
- Listed height: 6 ft 4 in (1.93 m)
- Listed weight: 255 lb (116 kg)

Career information
- High school: Lee's Summit North (Lee's Summit, Missouri)
- College: Missouri State (2018–2021); Hawaii (2022)
- NFL draft: 2023: undrafted

Career history
- Houston Texans (2023)*; Indianapolis Colts (2023)*; Arizona Cardinals (2024)*; New York Giants (2024)*; Chicago Bears (2025)*
- * Offseason or practice squad member only

Awards and highlights
- First-team FCS All-American (2018)
- Stats at Pro Football Reference

Jordan Murray (born April 20, 2000) is an American professional football tight end. He played college football for the Missouri State Bears and Hawaii Rainbow Warriors.

== Early life ==
Murray has an older brother and sister. He played his freshman and sophomore years at Summit Christian High where he was an all-conference pick at wide receiver and defensive back.

Murray then attended Lee's Summit North High School, where he played both football and basketball. In football, he started at tight end and defensive end for two years and was a two-time all-conference selection.

He earned Suburban Big Seven all-conference honorable mention status at tight end and defensive end and was all-conference at tight end his junior season.

== College career ==
Murray initially attended Missouri State near home. He played college football for Missouri State and Hawai'i.

He performed well in his freshman season with Missouri State. He was named to Division I FCS Freshman All-America first team by Phil Steele, and was a All-MVFC honorable mention selection and MVFC All-Newcomer Team honoree. He averaged 11.5 yards per reception as a true freshman. He broke the MSU rookie reception record with 33 catches for 378 yards and 4 touchdowns. His 378 receiving yards ranks third in program history by a freshman.

He later transferred to University of Hawai'i where he played for one season.

=== College statistics ===
Season	Team	GP	Receiving			
Season	Team	GP	Rec	Yds	Avg	TD
2018	MSU	11	33	378	11.5	4
2019	MSU	10	24	222	11.7	5
2020	MSU	9	16	212	11.7	0
2021	MSU	12	26	351	13.5	2
2022	HRW	6	10	70	7.0	0
Total		42	109	1266	12.1	11

== Professional career ==
Pre-draft measurables
Height	Weight	Arm length	Hand span	40-yard dash	10-yard split	20-yard split	20-yard shuttle	Three-cone drill	Vertical jump	Broad jump	Bench press
6 ft 3 5/8 in (1.92 m)	242 lb (110 kg)	33 1/8 in (0.84 m)	10 3/8 in (0.26 m)	4.73 s	1.69 s	2.71 s	4.31 s	7.19 s	34.5 in (0.88 m)	10 ft 0 in (3.05 m)	16 reps
All values from Pro Day

=== Houston Texans ===
Murray went undrafted in the 2023 NFL draft and was later signed by the Houston Texans on May 17, 2023. He was waived on August 29, 2023.

=== Indianapolis Colts ===
On September 12, 2023, Murray signed with the Indianapolis Colts practice squad. He signed a reserve/future contract on January 8, 2024. He was waived on August 27.

=== Arizona Cardinals ===
On August 29, 2024, Murray was signed to the Arizona Cardinals practice squad. He was released on October 15.

=== New York Giants ===
On November 20, 2024, Murray signed with the New York Giants practice squad.

=== Chicago Bears ===
On January 7, 2025, Murray signed a reserve/future contract with the Chicago Bears. He was waived/injured on August 6, and placed on injured reserve. On August 16, Murray was waived by the Bears.
