= Ty Scott =

American football player (born 1999)

No. 19 – DC Defenders
- Position: Wide receiver
- Roster status: Active

Personal information
- Born: March 27, 1999 (age 27); Estill, South Carolina, U.S.
- Listed height: 6 ft 1 in (1.85 m)
- Listed weight: 198 lb (90 kg)

Career information
- High school: Jenkins (Savannah, Georgia)
- College: Central Michigan (2018–2020); Missouri State (2021–2022)
- NFL draft: 2023: undrafted

Career history
- Kansas City Chiefs (2023)*; DC Defenders (2024); Seattle Seahawks (2024)*; DC Defenders (2025–present)
- * Offseason or practice squad member only

Awards and highlights
- UFL champion (2025); First-team All-MVFC (2021)

Career UFL statistics as of 2024
- Receptions: 25
- Receiving yards: 418
- Receiving touchdowns: 3
- Stats at Pro Football Reference

Tyrone Javar Scott (born March 27, 1999) is an American professional football wide receiver for the DC Defenders of the United Football League (UFL). He played college football at Central Michigan and Missouri State.

== Early life ==
Scott attended Jenkins High School in Savannah, Georgia. With Jenkins, Scott recorded 106 receptions for 2,165 yards and a school record 22 touchdowns. Scott would be named to the all-region team, and would commit to Central Michigan University to play college football over offers from Georgia Southern, Boston College, and Appalachian State.

== College career ==
=== Central Michigan ===
Scott red-shirted in 2018. The following season, Scott received significant playing time, starting ten games, while tallying 37 receptions, 650 yards, and five touchdowns. In the 2020 season, Scott would only appear in two games catching four passes for 33 yards. In March 2021, Scott announced his decision to transfer.

=== Missouri State ===
In April 2021, Scott announced he would be transferring to Missouri State University. Scott would make an immediate impact with the Bears, as he would set school records for receptions, receiving yards, and touchdowns. Scott's final stats for the season included 66 receptions, 1,110 yards receiving, and eight touchdowns. Scott would record a career high ten receptions against North Dakota and 174 receiving yards against Dixie State. Scott was named to the First-team All-Missouri Valley Conference at the season's end. Entering the 2022 season, Scott had high expectations from the media. In week two, Scott would haul in a career high three touchdowns.

== Professional career ==
Pre-draft measurables
Height	Weight	Arm length	Hand span	Wingspan	40-yard dash	10-yard split	20-yard split	20-yard shuttle	Three-cone drill	Vertical jump	Broad jump	Bench press
6 ft 1 1/4 in (1.86 m)	199 lb (90 kg)	32 7/8 in (0.84 m)	9 1/2 in (0.24 m)	6 ft 7 1/4 in (2.01 m)	4.59 s	1.60 s	2.62 s	4.41 s	7.04 s	33.5 in (0.85 m)	10 ft 2 in (3.10 m)	13 reps
All values from Pro Day

=== Kansas City Chiefs ===
Scott was signed by the Kansas City Chiefs as an undrafted free agent in 2023. He was waived on May 15, 2023. He re-signed with the Chiefs on July 28. He was waived on August 29, 2023.

=== DC Defenders (first stint) ===
On October 20, 2023, Scott signed with the DC Defenders of the United Football League (UFL). During the 2024 season, he recorded 25 receptions for 418 yards and three touchdowns.

=== Seattle Seahawks ===
On July 25, 2024, Scott signed with the Seattle Seahawks. He was waived on August 27 but later signed to the practice squad on September 10, only to be released three days later.

=== DC Defenders (second stint) ===
On December 14, 2024, Scott re-signed with the Defenders. He was placed on injured reserve on April 14, 2025, and activated on June 4.
