= 2026 Valparaiso Beacons football team =

American college football season

2026 Valparaiso Beacons football
- Conference: Pioneer Football League
- Record: 5–6 (4–4 PFL)
- Head coach: Andy Waddle (2nd season)
- Offensive coordinator: Reed Florence (2nd season)
- Defensive coordinator: Zach Feltrop (2nd season)
- Home stadium: Brown Field

2026 Pioneer Football League standings
	Conf.			Overall
Team	W		L	W		L
No. 24 Dayton +^	7	–	1	10	–	1
Butler +	7	–	1	10	–	2
St. Thomas (MN)	6	–	2	9	–	3
Marist	5	–	3	6	–	6
San Diego	4	–	3	5	–	5
Valparaiso	4	–	4	5	–	6
Presbyterian	3	–	5	4	–	7
Drake	3	–	5	3	–	8
Davidson	2	–	6	4	–	8
Morehead State	2	–	6	3	–	9
Stetson	0	–	7	1	–	10
+ – Conference co-champions; ^ – FCS playoff participant; As of November 22, 2026; Rankings from STATS Poll

The 2026 Valparaiso Beacons football team represents Valparaiso University as a member of the Pioneer Football League (PFL) during the 2026 NCAA Division I FCS football season. The Beacons are led by second-year head coach Andy Waddle, who is assisted by second-year offensive coordinator Reed Florence and second-year defensive coordinator Zach Feltrop. Home games are played at Brown Field in Valparaiso, Indiana.

== Schedule ==
Date	Time	Opponent	Site	TV	Result	Attendance
August 29	1:00 p.m.	Lawrence Tech*	Brown Field; Valparaiso, IN	ESPN+	W 59–13	1,534
September 12	6:00 p.m.	at Murray State*	Roy Stewart Stadium; Murray, KY	ESPN+	L 18–27	11,122
September 19	12:00 p.m.	at Indiana State*	Memorial Stadium; Terre Haute, IN	ESPN+	L 16–39	3,497
September 26	1:00 p.m.	Butler^{†}	Brown Field; Valparaiso, IN (Hoosier Helmet Trophy)	ESPN+	L 28–33	2,888
October 3	12:00 p.m.	at Morehead State	Phil Simms Stadium; Morehead, KY	ESPN+	W 37–3	4,128
October 10	1:00 p.m.	Drake	Brown Field; Valparaiso, IN	ESPN+	W 21–13	1,512
October 17	1:00 p.m.	at San Diego	Torero Stadium; San Diego, CA	ESPN+	L 13–38	3,817
October 24	12:00 p.m.	Presbyterian	Brown Field; Valparaiso, IN	ESPN+	W 24–7	1,299
November 7	11:00 a.m.	at Dayton	Welcome Stadium; Dayton, OH	YouTube	L 20–31	3,845
November 14	12:00 p.m.	at Stetson	Spec Martin Stadium; DeLand, FL	YouTube	W 34–31	1,877
November 21	1:00 p.m.	St. Thomas (MN)	Brown Field; Valparaiso, IN	ESPN+	L 7–13	1,592
*Non-conference game; ^{†}Homecoming; All times are in Central time

== Game summaries ==
=== Lawrence Tech (NAIA) ===
Lawrence Tech Blue Devils (0–0) at Valparaiso Beacons (0–0) – Game summary

Quarter	1	2	3	4	Total
Blue Devils (NAIA)	0	13	0	0	13
Beacons	21	17	14	7	59

at Brown Field • Valparaiso, Indiana

- Date: August 29
- Game time: 1:00 p.m.
- Game attendance: 1,534
- Referee: Tyler Downs, Jeff Engelmann, Samuel Banks, Steve Flanagan, Joe Abro, Bradley Mutnick, Mario Tobar, Leanne Surmin
- TV announcers (ESPN+): Todd Ickow and Tom Byrne

Game information

First quarter

- VAL – Marty O'Keeffe 4-yard pass from Rowan Keefe (Luke Scoma kick), 3:55. Beacons 7–0. Drive: 9 plays, 43 yards, 4:41.
- VAL – Cedric Benning III 1-yard run (Luke Scoma kick), 1:38. Beacons 14–0. Drive: 4 play, 21 yards, 1:59.
- VAL – Betrand Berry II 0-yard blocked punt return (Luke Scoma kick), 0:38. Beacons 21–0.

Second quarter

- VAL – Chris Gundy 59-yard punt return (Luke Scoma kick), 13:54. Beacons 28–0.
- LTU – Tyler Garrett 48-yard pass from Ryan Schuster (kick failed), 11:32. Beacons 28–6. Drive: 5 plays, 75 yards, 2:22.
- VAL – Michael Rumoro 3-yard run (Luke Scoma kick), 5:48. Beacons 35–6. Drive: 11 play, 75 yards, 5:44.
- LTU – Buddy Banks-Williams 33-yard run (Franco Bella kick), 2:43. Beacons 35–13. Drive: 6 play, 75 yards, 3:05.
- VAL – Luke Scoma 27-yard field goal, 0:07. Beacons 38–13. Drive: 8 plays, 41 yards, 2:26.

Third quarter

- VAL – Bryson Winbush 56-yard pass from Rowan Keefe (Luke Scoma kick), 9:46. Beacons 45–13. Drive: 5 plays, 72 yards, 3:05.
- VAL – Chris Gundy 41-yard punt return (Luke Scoma kick), 3:17. Beacons 52–13.

Fourth quarter

- VAL – Noah Ehrlich 2-yard run (Ryan Pimentel kick), 8:48. Beacons 59–13. Drive: 1 play, 2 yards, 0:03.

Statistics	LTU	VAL
First downs	12	19
Plays–yards	56–230	62–362
Rushes–yards	30–147	40–202
Passing yards	83	160
Passing: comp–att–int	7–26–1	14–22–0
Turnovers	1	0
Time of possession	26:47	33:13

Team	Category	Player	Statistics
Lawrence Tech	Passing	Ryan Schuster	6/20, 80 yards, TD, INT
Lawrence Tech	Rushing	Jaylen Flowers	10 carries, 91 yards
Lawrence Tech	Receiving	Tyler Garrett	2 receptions, 54 yards, TD
Valparaiso	Passing	Rowan Keefe	10/16, 133 yards, 2 TD
Valparaiso	Rushing	Michael Rumoro	15 carries, 41 yards, TD
Valparaiso	Receiving	Bryson Winbush	2 receptions, 58 yards, TD

=== at Murray State ===
Valparaiso Beacons (1–0) at Murray State Racers (0–2) – Game summary

Quarter	1	2	3	4	Total
Beacons	0	7	3	8	18
Racers	7	7	0	13	27

at Roy Stewart Stadium • Murray, Kentucky

- Date: September 12
- Game time: 6:00 p.m.
- Game weather: Sunny • Temperature: 85 °F (29 °C)
- Game attendance: 11,122
- Referee: Grant Henderson
- TV announcers (ESPN+): Casey Roehl (play-by-play) and Drayton Charlton-Perrin (analyst)

Game information

First quarter

- (3:51) MURR – Jawaun Northington 2-yard run, Rocco Devita kick (Drive: 13 plays, 59 yards, 5:55; Murray State 7–0)

Second quarter

- (11:41) VAL – Rowan Keefe 4-yard run, Luke Scoma kick (Drive: 8 plays, 72 yards, 4:22; Tied 7–7)
- (9:23) MURR – Mykel Allen 12-yard run, Rocco Devita kick (Drive: 4 plays, 62 yards, 2:11; Murray State 14–7)

Third quarter

- (2:27) VAL – Luke Scoma 37-yard field goal (Drive: 7 plays, 53 yards, 2:45; Murray State 14–10)

Fourth quarter

- (8:06) MURR – Baxter Wright 1-yard run, Rocco Devita kick (Drive: 9 plays, 56 yards, 3:49; Murray State 21–10)
- (4:57) VAL – Isaac Tran 23-yard pass from Rowan Keefe, Colin Hayes pass (Drive: 7 plays, 75 yards, 3:04; Murray State 21–18)
- (0:19) MURR – Mykel Allen 5-yard pass from Jim Ogle (Drive: 8 plays, 75 yards, 4:38; Murray State 27–18)

Statistics	VAL	MURR
First downs	14	19
Plays–yards	58–327	70–388
Rushes–yards	23–78	40–194
Passing yards	249	194
Passing: comp–att–int	20–35–1	18–30–1
Turnovers	1	1
Time of possession	27:35	32:25

Team	Category	Player	Statistics
Valparaiso	Passing	Rowan Keefe	20/35, 249 yards, TD, INT
Valparaiso	Rushing	Rowan Keefe	6 carries, 29 yards, TD
Valparaiso	Receiving	Chris Gundy	5 receptions, 107 yards
Murray State	Passing	Collin Shannon	11/17, 121 yards
Murray State	Rushing	Tyrell Campbell	14 carries, 117 yards
Murray State	Receiving	Trey Firestone	3 receptions, 62 yards

=== at Indiana State ===
Valparaiso Beacons (1–1) at Indiana State Sycamores (1–2) – Game summary

Quarter	1	2	3	4	Total
Beacons	3	0	7	6	16
Sycamores	5	17	14	3	39

at Memorial Stadium • Terre Haute, Indiana

- Date: September 19
- Game time: 12:00 p.m.
- Game weather: Sunny • Temperature: 90 °F (32 °C)
- Game attendance: 3,497
- Referee: Jason Berg
- TV announcers (ESPN+): Brian Jennings (play-by-play) and Austin Osborn (analyst)

Game information

First quarter

- INST – Sebastian Lopez 36-yard field goal, 11:23. Sycamores 3–0. Drive: 6 plays, 35 yards, 1:47.
- VAL – Luke Scoma 30-yard field goal, 5:31. Tied 3–3. Drive: 10 plays, 62 yards, 5:52.
- INST – 0-yard safety, 2:52. Sycamores 5–3.

Second quarter

- INST – Sebastian Lopez 28-yard field goal, 11:54. Sycamores 8–3. Drive: 6 plays, 71 yards, 2:14.
- INST – Jaylan Johnson 19-yard pass from Elijah Owens (Sebastian Lopez kick), 5:45. Sycamores 15–3. Drive: 10 plays, 50 yards, 3:52.
- INST – Aaron Ball 59-yard run (Sebastian Lopez kick), 3:56. Sycamores 22–3. Drive: 1 play, 59 yards, 0:13.

Third quarter

- INST – Aaron Ball 58-yard run (Sebastian Lopez kick), 10:35. Sycamores 29–3. Drive: 1 play, 58 yards, 0:11.
- VAL – Chris Gundy 11-yard pass from Rowan Keefe (Luke Scoma kick), 7:01. Sycamores 29–10. Drive: 9 plays, 68 yards, 3:27.
- INST – Keshon Singleton 16-yard pass from Brady Allen (Sebastian Lopez kick), 4:06. Sycamores 36–10. Drive: 6 plays, 75 yards, 2:55.

Fourth quarter

- INST – Sebastian Lopez 46-yard field goal, 13:22. Sycamores 39–10. Drive: 10 plays, 28 yards, 3:51.
- VAL – Daniel White 34-yard pass from Noah Ehrlich, 5:17. Sycamores 39–16. Drive: 5 plays, 52 yards, 1:15.

Statistics	VAL	INST
First downs	12	23
Plays–yards	62–211	75–568
Rushes–yards	24–−7	42–313
Passing yards	218	255
Passing: comp–att–int	24–38–1	19–33–1
Turnovers	1	1
Time of possession	30:06	29:54

Team	Category	Player	Statistics
Valparaiso	Passing	Rowan Keefe	21/30, 162 yards, TD
Valparaiso	Rushing	Ashton Allen	4 carries, 19 yards
Valparaiso	Receiving	Marty O'Keeffe	4 receptions, 56 yards
Indiana State	Passing	Elijah Owens	7/15, 115 yards, TD
Indiana State	Rushing	Aaron Ball	11 carries, 182 yards, 2 TD
Indiana State	Receiving	Manny Ellis	1 reception, 63 yards

=== Butler (Hoosier Helmet Trophy) ===
Butler Bulldogs (3–1) at Valparaiso Beacons (1–2) – Game summary

Quarter	1	2	3	4	Total
Bulldogs	3	7	7	16	33
Beacons	7	7	7	7	28

at Brown Field • Valparaiso, Indiana

- Date: September 26
- Game time: 1:00 p.m.
- Game weather: Sunny • Temperature: 69 °F (21 °C) • Wind: E at 4 miles per hour (6.4 km/h)
- Game attendance: 2,888
- Referee: Michael Hoffman
- TV announcers (ESPN+): Todd Ickow (play-by-play) and Tom Byrne (analyst)
- Box Score

Game information

First quarter

- (12:30) BUT – Beck Janki 41-yard field goal (Drive: 4 plays, 2 yards, 0:50; Butler 3–0)
- (4:22) VAL – Rowan Keefe 3-yard run, Luke Scoma kick (Drive: 10 plays, 58 yards, 6:02; Valparaiso 7–3)

Second quarter

- (14:50) VAL – Michael Rumoro 78-yard run, Luke Scoma kick (Drive: 3 plays, 85 yards, 1:28; Valparaiso 14–3)
- (3:07) BUT – Nick Munson 35-yard pass from Gabe Passini, Beck Janki kick (Drive: 6 plays, 63 yards, 3:19; Valparaiso 14–10)

Third quarter

- (11:03) BUT – Nick Munson 40-yard pass from Gabe Passini, Beck Janki kick (Drive: 8 plays, 75 yards, 3:57; Butler 17–14)
- (3:44) VAL – Devin Yeats 7-yard pass from Rowan Keefe, Luke Scoma kick (Drive: 13 plays, 75 yards, 7:19; Valparaiso 21–17)

Fourth quarter

- (14:46) BUT – Nick Munson 14-yard pass from Gabe Passini, Beck Janki kick (Drive: 7 plays, 75 yards, 3:58; Butler 24–21)
- (6:14) BUT – Beck Janki 40-yard field goal (Drive: 9 plays, 44 yards, 4:57; Butler 27–21)
- (2:44) BUT – Desmin Jackson 17-yard run, two-point conversion failed (Drive: 4 plays, 40 yards, 2:31; Butler 33–21)
- (1:56) VAL – Micah Mackay 15-yard pass from Rowan Keefe, Luke Scoma kick (Drive: 2 plays, 14 yards, 0:34; Butler 33–28)

Statistics	BUT	VAL
First downs	19	18
Plays–yards	59–371	61–331
Rushes–yards	42–216	26–144
Passing yards	155	187
Passing: comp–att–int	9–17–0	24–35–1
Turnovers	0	1
Time of possession	31:47	28:13

Team	Category	Player	Statistics
Butler	Passing	Gabe Passini	9/17, 155 yards, 3 TD
Butler	Rushing	Gabe Passini	20 carries, 104 yards
Butler	Receiving	Nick Munson	5 receptions, 114 yards, 3 TD
Valparaiso	Passing	Rowan Keefe	24/35, 187 yards, 2 TD, INT
Valparaiso	Rushing	Michael Rumoro	8 carries, 100 yards, TD
Valparaiso	Receiving	Chris Gundy	6 receptions, 59 yards

=== at Morehead State ===
Valparaiso Beacons (1–3) at Morehead State Eagles (1–3) – Game summary

Quarter	1	2	3	4	Total
Beacons	7	6	14	10	37
Eagles	3	0	0	0	3

at Phil Simms Stadium • Morehead, Kentucky

- Date: October 3
- Game time: 12:00 p.m.
- Game weather: Cloudy • Temperature: 69 °F (21 °C) • Wind: NW at 10 miles per hour (16 km/h)
- Game attendance: 4,128
- Referee: Gabriel Tomlin
- TV announcers (ESPN+): Jared Stacy (play-by-play) and Mark Ledford (analyst)
- Box Score

Game information

First quarter

- MOR – Jordan Price 28-yard field goal, 10:35. Eagles 3–0. Drive: 9 plays, 72 yards, 0:07.
- VAL – Chris Gundy 95-yard punt return (Luke Scoma kick), 5:53. Beacons 7–3.

Second quarter

- VAL – Luke Scoma 25-yard field goal, 8:41. Beacons 10–3. Drive: 7 plays, 16 yards, 3:09.
- VAL – Luke Scoma 21-yard field goal, 0:03. Beacons 13–3. Drive: 13 plays, 62 yards, 6:17.

Third quarter

- VAL – Daniel White 19-yard pass from Rowan Keefe (Luke Scoma kick), 7:46. Beacons 20–3. Drive: 6 plays, 27 yards, 3:11.
- VAL – Colin Hayes 7-yard pass from Rowan Keefe (Luke Scoma kick), 2:48. Beacons 27–3. Drive: 7 plays, 61 yards, 4:14.

Fourth quarter

- VAL – Cedric Benning III 1-yard run (Luke Scoma kick), 12:41. Beacons 34–3. Drive: 7 play, 53 yards, 3:20.
- VAL – Talan Samosky 26-yard field goal, 1:55. Beacons 37–3. Drive: 16 plays, 41 yards, 9:09.

Statistics	VAL	MORE
First downs	20	13
Plays–yards	74–389	53–251
Rushes–yards	46–161	23–137
Passing yards	228	114
Passing: comp–att–int	19–28–0	8–30–3
Turnovers	1	4
Time of possession	40:46	19:14

Team	Category	Player	Statistics
Valparaiso	Passing	Rowan Keefe	14/21, 174 yards, 2 TD
Valparaiso	Rushing	Cedric Benning III	19 carries, 91 yards, TD
Valparaiso	Receiving	Marty O'Keeffe	3 receptions, 90 yards
Morehead State	Passing	David Parsons	5/16, 83 yards, 2 INT
Morehead State	Rushing	Bryce Patterson	3 carries, 56 yards
Morehead State	Receiving	Cannon Dinger	3 receptions, 52 yards

=== Drake ===
Drake Bulldogs (2–3) at Valparaiso Beacons (2–3) – Game summary

Quarter	1	2	3	4	Total
Bulldogs	0	0	0	0	0
Beacons	0	0	0	0	0

at Brown Field • Valparaiso, Indiana

- Date: October 10
- Game time: 1:00 p.m.

Game information

First quarter
Second quarter
Third quarter
Fourth quarter

Statistics	DRKE	VAL
First downs		
Plays–yards		
Rushes–yards		
Passing yards		
Passing: comp–att–int		
Turnovers		
Time of possession		

Team	Category	Player	Statistics
Drake	Passing		
Drake	Rushing		
Drake	Receiving		
Valparaiso	Passing		
Valparaiso	Rushing		
Valparaiso	Receiving		

=== at San Diego ===
Valparaiso Beacons (3–3) at San Diego Toreros (2–4) – Game summary

Quarter	1	2	3	4	Total
Beacons	0	0	0	0	0
Toreros	0	0	0	0	0

at Torero Stadium • San Diego, California

- Date: October 17
- Game time: 1:00 p.m.

Game information

First quarter
Second quarter
Third quarter
Fourth quarter

Statistics	VAL	USD
First downs		
Plays–yards		
Rushes–yards		
Passing yards		
Passing: comp–att–int		
Turnovers		
Time of possession		

Team	Category	Player	Statistics
Valparaiso	Passing		
Valparaiso	Rushing		
Valparaiso	Receiving		
San Diego	Passing		
San Diego	Rushing		
San Diego	Receiving		

=== Presbyterian ===
Presbyterian Blue Hose (4–3) at Valparaiso Beacons (3–4) – Game summary

Quarter	1	2	3	4	Total
Blue Hose	0	0	0	0	0
Beacons	0	0	0	0	0

at Brown Field • Valparaiso, Indiana

- Date: October 24
- Game time: 12:00 p.m.

Game information

First quarter
Second quarter
Third quarter
Fourth quarter

Statistics	PRES	VAL
First downs		
Plays–yards		
Rushes–yards		
Passing yards		
Passing: comp–att–int		
Turnovers		
Time of possession		

Team	Category	Player	Statistics
Presbyterian	Passing		
Presbyterian	Rushing		
Presbyterian	Receiving		
Valparaiso	Passing		
Valparaiso	Rushing		
Valparaiso	Receiving		

=== at Dayton ===
Valparaiso Beacons (4–4) at Dayton Flyers (7–1) – Game summary

Quarter	1	2	3	4	Total
Beacons	0	0	0	0	0
Flyers	0	0	0	0	0

at Welcome Stadium • Dayton, Ohio

- Date: November 7
- Game time: 11:00 a.m.

Game information

First quarter
Second quarter
Third quarter
Fourth quarter

Statistics	VAL	DAY
First downs		
Plays–yards		
Rushes–yards		
Passing yards		
Passing: comp–att–int		
Turnovers		
Time of possession		

Team	Category	Player	Statistics
Valparaiso	Passing		
Valparaiso	Rushing		
Valparaiso	Receiving		
Dayton	Passing		
Dayton	Rushing		
Dayton	Receiving		

=== at Stetson ===
Valparaiso Beacons (4–5) at Stetson Hatters (1–9) – Game summary

Quarter	1	2	3	4	Total
Beacons	0	0	0	0	0
Hatters	0	0	0	0	0

at Spec Martin Stadium • DeLand, Florida

- Date: November 14
- Game time: 12:00 p.m.

Game information

First quarter
Second quarter
Third quarter
Fourth quarter

Statistics	VAL	STET
First downs		
Plays–yards		
Rushes–yards		
Passing yards		
Passing: comp–att–int		
Turnovers		
Time of possession		

Team	Category	Player	Statistics
Valparaiso	Passing		
Valparaiso	Rushing		
Valparaiso	Receiving		
Stetson	Passing		
Stetson	Rushing		
Stetson	Receiving		

=== St. Thomas (MN) ===
St. Thomas Tommies (8–3) at Valparaiso Beacons (5–5) – Game summary

Quarter	1	2	3	4	Total
Tommies	0	0	0	0	0
Beacons	0	0	0	0	0

at Brown Field • Valparaiso, Indiana

- Date: November 21
- Game time: 1:00 p.m.

Game information

First quarter
Second quarter
Third quarter
Fourth quarter

Statistics	STMN	VAL
First downs		
Plays–yards		
Rushes–yards		
Passing yards		
Passing: comp–att–int		
Turnovers		
Time of possession		

Team	Category	Player	Statistics
St. Thomas (MN)	Passing		
St. Thomas (MN)	Rushing		
St. Thomas (MN)	Receiving		
Valparaiso	Passing		
Valparaiso	Rushing		
Valparaiso	Receiving		

== Rankings ==
Ranking movements Legend: ██ Increase in ranking ██ Decrease in ranking — = Not ranked RV = Received votes
	Week														
Poll	Pre	1	2	3	4	5	6	7	8	9	10	11	12	13	Final
STATS FCS	—	—	—	—	—	—	—								
Coaches	RV	—	—	—	—	—	—								
