= 2026 Drake Bulldogs football team =

American college football season

2026 Drake Bulldogs football
- Conference: Pioneer Football League
- Record: 3–8 (3–5 PFL)
- Head coach: Matt Walker (1st season)
- Offensive coordinator: Joe Matheson (1st season)
- Defensive coordinator: Mark Sipple (1st season)
- Home stadium: Drake Stadium

2026 Pioneer Football League standings
	Conf.			Overall
Team	W		L	W		L
Dayton	6	–	1	9	–	1
Butler	6	–	1	9	–	2
St. Thomas (MN)	5	–	2	8	–	3
San Diego	4	–	3	5	–	5
Valparaiso	4	–	3	5	–	5
Marist	4	–	3	5	–	6
Presbyterian	3	–	4	4	–	6
Drake	3	–	5	3	–	8
Davidson	2	–	5	4	–	7
Morehead State	2	–	5	3	–	8
Stetson	0	–	7	1	–	10
As of November 15, 2026; Rankings from STATS Poll

The 2026 Drake Bulldogs football team represented Drake University as a member of the Pioneer Football League (PFL) during the 2026 NCAA Division I FCS football season. The Bulldogs were led by first-year head coach Matt Walker, who took over for former coach Joe Woodley who left the program to become the linebaackers coach at Rutgers. Walker was assisted by first-year offensive coordinator Joe Matheson and first-year defensive coordinator Mark Sipple. The Bulldogs played their home games at Drake Stadium in Des Moines, Iowa.

== Schedule ==
Date	Time	Opponent	Site	TV	Result	Attendance
August 27	6:30 p.m.	South Dakota Mines*	Drake Stadium; Des Moines, IA	ESPN+	L 35–38	3,350
September 5	2:00 p.m.	at No. 3 Montana*	Washington-Grizzly Stadium; Missoula, MT	ESPN+	L 10–45	25,915
September 12	1:00 p.m.	at Northern Iowa*	UNI Dome; Cedar Falls, IA (rivalry)	ESPN+	L 14–56	9,170
September 26	12:00 p.m.	at Davidson	Davidson College Stadium; Davidson, NC	ESPN+	W 51–32	1,954
October 3	12:00 p.m.	Dayton^{†}	Drake Stadium; Des Moines, IA	ESPN+	W 30–22	3,127
October 10	1:00 p.m.	at Valparaiso	Brown Field; Valparaiso, IN	ESPN+	L 13–21	1,512
October 17	12:00 p.m.	Marist	Drake Stadium; Des Moines, IA	ESPN+	L 22–27	2,639
October 24	12:00 p.m.	Butler	Drake Stadium; Des Moines, IA	ESPN+	L 21–33	2,560
October 31	12:00 p.m.	at Morehead State	Phil Simms Stadium; Morehead, KY	ESPN+	W 45–35	4,202
November 7	12:00 p.m.	San Diego	Drake Stadium; Des Moines, IA	ESPN+	L 17–40	2,574
November 14	1:00 p.m.	at St. Thomas (MN)	O'Shaughnessy Stadium; Saint Paul, MN	ESPN+	L 35–55	2,466
*Non-conference game; ^{†}Homecoming; Rankings from STATS Poll released prior to the game; All times are in Central time

== Game summaries ==
=== South Dakota Mines (DII) ===
South Dakota Mines Hardrockers (DII) (0–0) at Drake Bulldogs (0–0) – Game summary

Quarter	1	2	3	4	Total
Hardrockers (DII)	0	17	14	7	38
Bulldogs	10	3	0	22	35

at Drake Stadium • Des Moines, Iowa

- Date: August 27
- Game time: 6:30 p.m.
- Game weather: Sunny • Temperature: 78 °F (26 °C) • Wind: NW at 5 miles per hour (8.0 km/h)
- Game attendance: 3,350
- Referee: Jason Berg
- TV: ESPN+

Game information

First quarter

- DRKE – Griffin Kollhoff 36-yard field goal, 11:26. Bulldogs 3–0. Drive: 11 plays, 56 yards, 3:34.
- DRKE – Lincoln DeLaere 30-yard pass from Riley Warzynski (Griffin Kollhoff kick), 7:55. Bulldogs 10–0. Drive: 8 plays, 82 yards, 2:34.

Second quarter

- SDM – Dawson Dunbar 58-yard pass from Gage Baker (Sam Eccles kick), 9:01. Bulldogs 10–7. Drive: 2 plays, 51 yards, 1:00.
- SDM – Dawson Dunbar 49-yard run (Sam Eccles kick), 7:35. Hardrockers 14–10. Drive: 5 plays, 70 yards, 0:22.
- DRKE – Griffin Kollhoff 27-yard field goal, 2:16. Hardrockers 14–13. Drive: 11 plays, 55 yards, 3:05.
- SDM – Sam Eccles 13-yard field goal, 0:00. Hardrockers 17–13. Drive: 9 plays, 62 yards, 2:16.

Third quarter

- SDM – Joshua Morales 44-yard pass from Gage Baker (Sam Eccles kick), 13:37. Hardrockers 24–13. Drive: 3 plays, 75 yards, 1:15.
- SDM – Blake Borchers 36-yard pass from Gage Baker (Sam Eccles kick), 6:27. Hardrockers 31–13. Drive: 9 plays, 91 yards, 5:09.

Fourth quarter

- DRKE – Willis Nofsinger 80-yard pass from Riley Warzynski (Griffin Kollhoff kick), 12:13. Hardrockers 31–20. Drive: 1 play, 80 yards, 0:11.
- DRKE – Hank Foley 73-yard pass from Riley Warzynski (Riley Warzynski–Kobe Lewis pass), 9:18. Hardrockers 31–28. Drive: 4 plays, 80 yards, 0:36.
- DRKE – Karson Kindred 2-yard blocked punt return (Griffin Kollhoff kick), 7:52. Bulldogs 35–31.
- SDM – Dawson Dunbar 3-yard run (Sam Eccles kick), 1:56. Hardrockers 38–35. Drive: 16 plays, 79 yards, 5:49.

Statistics	SDM	DRKE
First downs	29	26
Plays–yards	79–547	73–559
Rushes–yards	48–241	17–24
Passing yards	306	535
Passing: comp–att–int	19–31–0	38–56–1
Turnovers	1	2
Time of possession	35:55	24:05

Team	Category	Player	Statistics
South Dakota Mines	Passing	Gage Baker	19/31, 306 yards, 3 TD
South Dakota Mines	Rushing	Dawson Dunbar	17 carries, 120 yards, 2 TD
South Dakota Mines	Receiving	Dawson Dunbar	3 receptions, 94 yards, TD
Drake	Passing	Riley Warzynski	38/56, 535 yards, 3 TD, INT
Drake	Rushing	Cody Blicharz	5 carries, 8 yards
Drake	Receiving	Willis Nofsinger	10 receptions, 168 yards, TD

=== at No. 3 Montana ===
Drake Bulldogs (0–1) at No. 3 Montana Grizzlies (1–0) – Game summary

Quarter	1	2	3	4	Total
Bulldogs	3	0	0	7	10
No. 3 Grizzlies	14	7	14	10	45

at Washington–Grizzly Stadium • Missoula, Montana

- Date: September 5
- Game time: 2:00 p.m.
- Game weather: Sunny • Temperature: 68 °F (20 °C) • Wind: E at 10 miles per hour (16 km/h)
- Game attendance: 25,915
- Referee: Mike Bezner
- TV: ESPN+

Game information

First quarter

- DRKE – Griffin Kollhoff 22-yard field goal, 12:09. Bulldogs 3–0. Drive: 7 plays, 65 yards, 1:37.
- MONT – Eli Gillman 3-yard run (Jo Silver kick), 7:00. Grizzlies 7–3. Drive: 13 plays, 75 yards, 5:09.
- MONT – Eli Gillman 3-yard run (Jo Silver kick), 2:11. Grizzlies 14–3. Drive: 6 plays, 39 yards, 2:50.

Second quarter

- MONT – Eli Gillman 1-yard run (Jo Silver kick), 7:19. Grizzlies 21–3. Drive: 10 plays, 81 yards, 4:08.

Third quarter

- MONT – Eli Gillman 1-yard pass from Keali'i Ah Yat (Jo Silver kick), 4:01. Grizzlies 28—3. Drive: 7 plays, 39 yards, 3:06.
- MONT – Brooks Davis 26-yard pass from Keali'i Ah Yat (Jo Silver kick), 0:53. Grizzlies 35–3. Drive: 3 plays, 36 yards, 1:12.

Fourth quarter

- DRKE – Kavaughn Clark 10-yard pass from Riley Warzynski (Griffin Kollhoff kick), 9:30. Grizzlies 35–10. Drive: 7 plays, 63 yards, 2:03.
- MONT – Jo Silver 50-yard field goal, 4:05. Grizzlies 38–10. Drive: 10 plays, 37 yards, 5:23.
- MONT – Dylan Paine 1-yard run (Jo Silver kick), 1:27. Grizzlies 45–10. Drive: 5 plays, 30 yards, 2:02.

Statistics	DRKE	MONT
First downs	24	26
Plays–yards	85–297	83–488
Rushes–yards	21–45	42–206
Passing yards	252	282
Passing: comp–att–int	31–64–0	27–41–0
Turnovers	2	0
Time of possession	27:00	33:00

Team	Category	Player	Statistics
Drake	Passing	Riley Warzynski	31/60, 252 yards, TD
Drake	Rushing	Chase Spellman	5 carries, 20 yards
Drake	Receiving	Willis Nofsinger	6 receptions, 89 yards
Montana	Passing	Keali'i Ah Yat	27/40, 282 yards, 2 TD
Montana	Rushing	Eli Gillman	19 carries, 105 yards, 3 TD
Montana	Receiving	Landon Ransom-Goelz	5 receptions, 101 yards

=== at Northern Iowa (rivalry) ===
Drake Bulldogs (0–2) at Northern Iowa Panthers (0–1) – Game summary

Quarter	1	2	3	4	Total
Bulldogs	7	7	0	0	14
Panthers	21	7	21	7	56

at UNI-Dome • Cedar Falls, Iowa

- Date: September 12
- Game time: 1:00 p.m.
- Game weather: Indoors
- Game attendance: 9,170
- Referee: Tyler Downs
- TV announcers (ESPN+): Brad Wells (play-by-play) and Justin Surrency (analyst)

Game information

First quarter

- (12:15) UNI – Ben Gordon 12-yard run, Max Bartachek kick (Drive: 5 plays, 47 yards, 2:22; Northern Iowa 7–0)
- (7:56) UNI – Brady McCullough 14-yard pass from Jaxon Dailey, Max Bartachek kick (Drive: 6 plays, 79 yards, 2:49; Northern Iowa 14–0)
- (3:55) DRKE – Mitchell January 43-yard pass from Riley Warzynski, Griffin Kollhoff kick (Drive: 7 plays, 80 yards, 1:52; Northern Iowa 14–7)
- (0:28) UNI – Brady McCullough 17-yard pass from Jaxon Dailey, Max Bartachek kick (Drive: 8 plays, 70 yards, 3:22; Northern Iowa 21–7)

Second quarter

- (11:04) DRKE – Lincoln DeLaere 6-yard pass from Riley Warzynski, Griffin Kollhoff kick (Drive: 14 plays, 71 yards, 4:18; Northern Iowa 21–14)
- (0:41) UNI – Brady McCullough 13-yard pass from Jaxon Dailey, Max Bartachek kick (Drive: 5 plays, 27 yards, 1:59; Northern Iowa 28–14)

Third quarter

- (11:41) UNI – Christian Collins 7-yard run, Max Bartachek kick (Drive: 6 plays, 69 yards, 3:12; Northern Iowa 35–14)
- (8:50) UNI – Calvin Jaworski 80-yard interception, Max Bartachek kick (Northern Iowa 42–14)
- (2:48) UNI – Michael Bormann 2-yard run, Max Bartachek kick (Drive: 9 plays, 62 yards, 4:32; Northern Iowa 49–14)

Fourth quarter

- (6:42) UNI – Caleb Kamara 28-yard run, Rico Alvarenga-Servellon kick (Drive: 2 plays, 31 yards, 0:48; Northern Iowa 56–14)

Statistics	DRKE	UNI
First downs	21	25
Plays–yards	79–325	66–443
Rushes–yards	27–29	43–201
Passing yards	296	242
Passing: comp–att–int	31–52–3	16–23–0
Turnovers	5	0
Time of possession	25:24	34:36

Team	Category	Player	Statistics
Drake	Passing	Riley Warzynski	27/47, 241 yards, 2 TD, 3 INT
Drake	Rushing	Braylon Wilson	6 carries, 19 yards
Drake	Receiving	Mitchell January	5 receptions, 75 yards, TD
Northern Iowa	Passing	Jaxon Dailey	16/23, 242 yards, 3 TD
Northern Iowa	Rushing	Caleb Kamara	4 carries, 49 yards, TD
Northern Iowa	Receiving	Brady McCullough	4 receptions, 69 yards, 3 TD

=== at Davidson ===
Drake Bulldogs (0–3) at Davidson Wildcats (2–2) – Game summary

Quarter	1	2	3	4	Total
Bulldogs	0	0	0	0	0
Wildcats	0	0	0	0	0

at Davidson College Stadium • Davidson, North Carolina

- Date: September 26
- Game time: 12:00 p.m.
- Game attendance: 1,954
- TV: ESPN+

Game information

First quarter
Second quarter
Third quarter
Fourth quarter

Statistics	DRKE	DAV
First downs		
Plays–yards		
Rushes–yards		
Passing yards		
Passing: comp–att–int		
Turnovers		
Time of possession		

Team	Category	Player	Statistics
Drake	Passing		
Drake	Rushing		
Drake	Receiving		
Davidson	Passing		
Davidson	Rushing		
Davidson	Receiving		

=== Dayton ===
Dayton Flyers (3–0) at Drake Bulldogs (1–3) – Game summary

Quarter	1	2	3	4	Total
Flyers	0	0	0	0	0
Bulldogs	0	0	0	0	0

at Drake Stadium • Des Moines, Iowa

- Date: October 3
- Game time: 12:00 p.m. CDT
- Game attendance: 3,127
- TV: ESPN+

Game information

First quarter
Second quarter
Third quarter
Fourth quarter

Statistics	DAY	DRKE
First downs		
Plays–yards		
Rushes–yards		
Passing yards		
Passing: comp–att–int		
Turnovers		
Time of possession		

Team	Category	Player	Statistics
Dayton	Passing		
Dayton	Rushing		
Dayton	Receiving		
Drake	Passing		
Drake	Rushing		
Drake	Receiving		

=== at Valparaiso ===
Drake Bulldogs (2–3) at Valparaiso Beacons (2–3) – Game summary

Quarter	1	2	3	4	Total
Bulldogs	0	0	0	0	0
Beacons	0	0	0	0	0

at Brown Field • Valparaiso, Indiana

- Date: October 10
- Game time: 1:00 p.m.
- Game attendance: 1,512
- TV: ESPN+

Game information

First quarter
Second quarter
Third quarter
Fourth quarter

Statistics	DRKE	VAL
First downs		
Plays–yards		
Rushes–yards		
Passing yards		
Passing: comp–att–int		
Turnovers		
Time of possession		

Team	Category	Player	Statistics
Drake	Passing		
Drake	Rushing		
Drake	Receiving		
Valparaiso	Passing		
Valparaiso	Rushing		
Valparaiso	Receiving		

=== Marist ===
Marist Red Foxes (3–3) at Drake Bulldogs (2–4) – Game summary

Quarter	1	2	3	4	Total
Red Foxes	0	0	0	0	0
Bulldogs	0	0	0	0	0

at Drake Stadium • Des Moines, Iowa

- Date: October 17
- Game time: 12:00 p.m. CDT
- Game attendance: 2,639
- TV: ESPN+

Game information

First quarter
Second quarter
Third quarter
Fourth quarter

Statistics	MRST	DRKE
First downs		
Plays–yards		
Rushes–yards		
Passing yards		
Passing: comp–att–int		
Turnovers		
Time of possession		

Team	Category	Player	Statistics
Marist	Passing		
Marist	Rushing		
Marist	Receiving		
Drake	Passing		
Drake	Rushing		
Drake	Receiving		

=== Butler ===
Butler Bulldogs (5–2) at Drake Bulldogs (2–5) – Game summary

Quarter	1	2	3	4	Total
Butler	10	7	3	13	33
Drake	14	7	0	0	21

at Drake Stadium • Des Moines, Iowa

- Date: October 24
- Game time: 12:00 p.m.
- Game weather: Sunny • Temperature: 72 °F (22 °C) • Wind: S at 9 miles per hour (14 km/h)
- Game attendance: 2,560
- Referee: Grant Henderson
- TV announcers (ESPN+): Michael Admire (play-by-play) and Justin Surrency (analyst)

Game information

First quarter

- (12:27) DRKE – Lincoln DeLaere 32-yard pass from Riley Warzynski, Griffin Kollhoff kick (Drive: 9 plays, 75 yards, 2:33; Drake 7–0)
- (7:14) BUT – Beck Janki 37-yard field goal (Drive: 10 plays, 45 yards, 5:13; Drake 7–3)
- (4:04) DRKE – Kavaughn Clark 7-yard run, Griffin Kollhoff kick (Drive: 8 plays, 75 yards, 3:10; Drake 14–3)
- (0:05) BUT – Luke Snyder 2-yard pass from Gabe Passini, Beck Janki kick (Drive: 7 plays, 65 yards, 3:53; Drake 14–10)

Second quarter

- (8:14) BUT – Michael Dellumo 2-yard run, Beck Janki kick (Drive: 8 plays, 80 yards, 4:36; Butler 17–14)
- (0:07) DRKE – Lucci Fidone 11-yard pass from Riley Warzynski, Griffin Kollhoff kick (Drive: 10 plays, 66 yards, 1:27; Drake 21–17)

Third quarter

- (3:34) BUT – Beck Janki 27-yard field goal (Drive: 4 plays, 4 yards, 1:37; Drake 21–20)

Fourth quarter

- (8:23) BUT – Desmin Jackson 2-yard run, two-point conversion failed (Drive: 3 plays, 35 yards, 1:33; Butler 26–21)
- (7:16) BUT – Gabe Passini 3-yard run, Beck Janki kick (Drive: 2 plays, 2 yards, 0:51; Butler 33–21)

Statistics	BUT	DRKE
First downs	19	16
Plays–yards	69–393	67–312
Rushes–yards	52–244	29–73
Passing yards	149	239
Passing: comp–att–int	7–17–1	25–38–1
Turnovers	1	2
Time of possession	38:22	21:38

Team	Category	Player	Statistics
Butler	Passing	Gabe Passini	6/16, 118 yards, TD, INT
Butler	Rushing	Desmin Jackson	17 carries, 91 yards, TD
Butler	Receiving	Nick Munson	3 receptions, 44 yards
Drake	Passing	Riley Warzynski	21/27, 200 yards, 2 TD
Drake	Rushing	Kavaughn Clark	9 carries, 39 yards, TD
Drake	Receiving	Willis Nofsinger	3 receptions, 51 yards

=== at Morehead State ===
Drake Bulldogs (2–6) at Morehead State Eagles (2–6) – Game summary

Quarter	1	2	3	4	Total
Bulldogs	0	0	0	0	0
Eagles	0	0	0	0	0

at Phil Simms Stadium • Morehead, Kentucky

- Date: October 31
- Game time: 12:00 p.m.
- TV: ESPN+

Game information

First quarter
Second quarter
Third quarter
Fourth quarter

Statistics	DRKE	MORE
First downs		
Plays–yards		
Rushes–yards		
Passing yards		
Passing: comp–att–int		
Turnovers		
Time of possession		

Team	Category	Player	Statistics
Drake	Passing		
Drake	Rushing		
Drake	Receiving		
Morehead State	Passing		
Morehead State	Rushing		
Morehead State	Receiving		

=== San Diego ===
San Diego Toreros (4–5) at Drake Bulldogs (3–6) – Game summary

Quarter	1	2	3	4	Total
Toreros	0	0	0	0	0
Bulldogs	0	0	0	0	0

at Drake Stadium • Des Moines, Iowa

- Date: November 7
- Game time: 12:00 p.m.
- TV: ESPN+

Game information

First quarter
Second quarter
Third quarter
Fourth quarter

Statistics	USD	DRKE
First downs		
Plays–yards		
Rushes–yards		
Passing yards		
Passing: comp–att–int		
Turnovers		
Time of possession		

Team	Category	Player	Statistics
San Diego	Passing		
San Diego	Rushing		
San Diego	Receiving		
Drake	Passing		
Drake	Rushing		
Drake	Receiving		

=== at St. Thomas (MN) ===
Drake Bulldogs (3–7) at St. Thomas Tommies (7–3) – Game summary

Quarter	1	2	3	4	Total
Bulldogs	0	0	0	0	0
Tommies	0	0	0	0	0

at O'Shaughnessy Stadium • Saint Paul, Minnesota

- Date: November 14
- Game time: 1:00 p.m.
- TV: ESPN+

Game information

First quarter
Second quarter
Third quarter
Fourth quarter

Statistics	DRKE	STMN
First downs		
Plays–yards		
Rushes–yards		
Passing yards		
Passing: comp–att–int		
Turnovers		
Time of possession		

Team	Category	Player	Statistics
Drake	Passing		
Drake	Rushing		
Drake	Receiving		
St. Thomas (MN)	Passing		
St. Thomas (MN)	Rushing		
St. Thomas (MN)	Receiving		

== Rankings ==
Ranking movements Legend: ██ Increase in ranking ██ Decrease in ranking — = Not ranked RV = Received votes
	Week														
Poll	Pre	1	2	3	4	5	6	7	8	9	10	11	12	13	Final
STATS	RV	—													
Coaches	—	—													
