= 2026 Presbyterian Blue Hose football team =

American college football season

2026 Presbyterian Blue Hose football
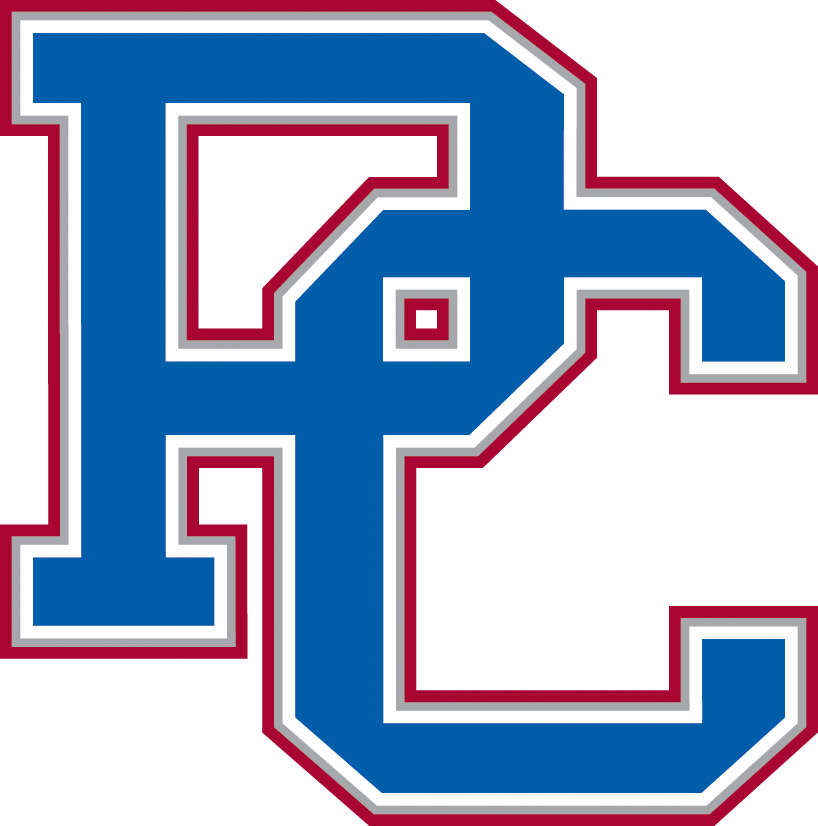
- Conference: Pioneer Football League
- Record: 4–7 (3–5 PFL)
- Head coach: Matt Rahl (1st season)
- Offensive coordinator: Mike Babcock (1st season)
- Defensive coordinator: Michael Bruno (1st season)
- Home stadium: Bailey Memorial Stadium

2026 Pioneer Football League standings
	Conf.			Overall
Team	W		L	W		L
No. 24 Dayton +^	7	–	1	10	–	1
Butler +	7	–	1	10	–	2
St. Thomas (MN)	6	–	2	9	–	3
Marist	5	–	3	6	–	6
San Diego	4	–	3	5	–	5
Valparaiso	4	–	4	5	–	6
Presbyterian	3	–	5	4	–	7
Drake	3	–	5	3	–	8
Davidson	2	–	6	4	–	8
Morehead State	2	–	6	3	–	9
Stetson	0	–	7	1	–	10
+ – Conference co-champions; ^ – FCS playoff participant; As of November 22, 2026; Rankings from STATS Poll

The 2026 Presbyterian Blue Hose football team represent Presbyterian College as a member of the Pioneer Football League (PFL) during the 2026 NCAA Division I FCS football season. The Blue Hose are led by first-year head coach Matt Rahl and play home games at Bailey Memorial Stadium located in Clinton, South Carolina.

== Schedule ==
Date	Time	Opponent	Site	TV	Result	Attendance
August 27	7:00 p.m.	UVA Wise*	Bailey Memorial Stadium; Clinton, SC	ESPN+	W 47–37	2,766
September 5	6:00 p.m.	at No. 19 Mercer*	Five Star Stadium; Macon, GA	ESPN+	L 3–62	4,013
September 19	2:30 p.m.	at Western Carolina*	E.J. Whitmire Stadium; Cullowhee, NC	ESPN+	L 14–54	11,811
September 26	12:00 p.m.	at Marist	Leonidoff Field; Poughkeepsie, NY	ESPN+	L 7–42	1,120
October 3	1:00 p.m.	St. Thomas (MN)	Bailey Memorial Stadium; Clinton, SC	ESPN+	W 55–21	1,741
October 10	5:30 p.m.	Davidson	Bailey Memorial Stadium; Clinton, SC	ESPN+	W 38–21	1,341
October 17	2:00 p.m.	at Stetson	Spec Martin Stadium; DeLand, FL	YouTube	W 47–43	2,253
October 24	1:00 p.m.	at Valparaiso	Brown Field; Valparaiso, IN	ESPN+	L 7–24	1,299
October 31	1:00 p.m.	Butler^{†}	Bailey Memorial Stadium; Clinton, SC	ESPN+	L 10–27	2,435
November 14	12:00 p.m.	at Morehead State	Phil Simms Stadium; Morehead, KY	ESPN+	L 28–25	3,303
November 21	1:00 p.m.	No. 24 Dayton	Bailey Memorial Stadium; Clinton, SC	ESPN+	L 11–27	1,778
*Non-conference game; ^{†}Homecoming; Rankings from STATS Poll released prior to the game; All times are in Eastern time

== Game summaries ==
=== UVA Wise (DII) ===
UVA Wise Cavaliers (DII) (0–0) at Presbyterian Blue Hose (0–0) – Game summary

Quarter	1	2	3	4	Total
Cavaliers (DII)	7	9	14	7	37
Blue Hose	7	10	21	9	47

at Bailey Memorial Stadium • Clinton, South Carolina

- Date: August 27
- Game time: 7:00 p.m.
- Game weather: Cloudy • Temperature: 80 °F (27 °C) • Wind: N 3 miles per hour (4.8 km/h)
- Game attendance: 2,766
- Referee: Brian Hilpisch
- TV announcers (ESPN+): Gabriel Schray (play-by-play) and Tim Webb (analyst)

Game information

First quarter

- UVAW – Thomas McCoy 17-yard pass from McCalan Beason (Ryder Lawson kick), 12:50. Cavaliers 7–0. Drive: 6 plays, 34 yards, 1:56.
- PRES – Damion Moate 1-yard run (Kade Bailey kick), 9:02. Tied 7–7. Drive: 10 plays, 75 yards, 3:48.

Second quarter

- PRES – Kade Bailey 34-yard field goal, 11:38. Blue Hose 10–7. Drive: 12 plays, 59 yards, 3:22.
- UVAW – Ryder Lawson 35-yard field goal, 7:10. Tied 10–10. Drive: 12 plays, 52 yards, 4:22.
- PRES – Jackson Burleson 2-yard run (Kade Bailey kick), 5:52. Blue Hose 17–10. Drive: 4 plays, 65 yards, 1:18.
- UVAW – Tre'mell Washington 56-yard pass from McCalan Beason (run failed), 0:35. Blue Hose 17–16. Drive: 4 plays, 77 yards, 0:38.

Third quarter

- PRES – Jalen Patrick 17-yard pass from Landon Sharpe (Kade Bailey kick), 14:48. Blue Hose 24–16. Drive: 1 play, 17 yards, 0:06.
- UVAW – McCalan Beason 62-yard run (Ryder Lawson kick), 13:40. Blue Hose 24–23. Drive: 3 plays, 71 yards, 1:02.
- PRES – Jackson Burleson 22-yard pass from Landon Sharpe (Kade Bailey kick), 11:23. Blue Hose 31–23. Drive: 7 plays, 71 yards, 2:02.
- UVAW – Hunter Purdue 42-yard pass from McCalan Beason (Ryder Lawson kick), 10:04. Blue Hose 31–30. Drive: 3 plays, 60 yards, 1:12.
- PRES – Landon Sharpe 4-yard run (Kade Bailey kick), 5:07. Blue Hose 38–30. Drive: 11 plays, 70 yards, 4:49.

Fourth quarter

- PRES – Kade Bailey 23-yard field goal, 10:38. Blue Hose 41–30. Drive: 6 plays, 21 yards, 1:43.
- PRES – Caleb Johnson 16-yard pass from Landon Sharpe (Kade Bailey PAT blocked), 8:17. Blue Hose 47–30. Drive: 4 plays, 30 yards, 1:36.
- UVAW – McCalan Beason 1-yard run (Ryder Lawson kick), 0:55. Blue Hose 47–37. Drive: 8 plays, 99 yards, 1:49.

Statistics	UVAW	PRES
First downs	19	31
Plays–yards	71–489	93–571
Rushes–yards	29–151	45–164
Passing yards	338	407
Passing: comp–att–int	20–42–1	34–48–1
Turnovers	3	3
Time of possession	25:57	34:03

Team	Category	Player	Statistics
UVA Wise	Passing	McCalan Beason	20/42, 338 yards, 3 TD, INT
UVA Wise	Rushing	McCalan Beason	16 carries, 99 yards, 2 TD
UVA Wise	Receiving	Hunter Purdue	6 receptions, 163 yards, TD
Presbyterian	Passing	Landon Sharpe	30/43, 367 yards, 3 TD, INT
Presbyterian	Rushing	Landon Sharpe	17 carries, 88 yards, TD
Presbyterian	Receiving	Anton Smith	6 receptions, 105 yards

=== at No. 19 Mercer ===
Presbyterian Blue Hose (1–0) at No. 19 Mercer Bears (1–0) – Game summary

Quarter	1	2	3	4	Total
Blue Hose	0	3	0	0	3
No. 19 Bears	20	21	7	14	62

at Five Star Stadium • Macon, Georgia

- Date: September 5
- Game time: 6:00 p.m.
- Game weather: Cloudy • Temperature: 94 °F (34 °C) • Wind: N at 2 miles per hour (3.2 km/h)
- Game attendance: 4,013
- Referee: Jake Grombach
- TV announcers (ESPN+): Frank Malloy (play-by-play) and Phil Cox (analyst)

Game information

First quarter

- MER – Jaylen King 16-yard run (Simon Zeidan kick), 12:00. Bears 7–0. Drive: 5 plays, 50 yards, 2:01.
- MER – Brayden Smith 51-yard pass from Jaylen King (pass failed), 9:50. Bears 13–0. Drive: 3 plays, 57 yards, 1:04.
- MER – Eric Rasheed 32-yard pass from Jaylen King (Simon Zeidan kick), 6:13. Bears 20–0. Drive: 5 plays, 86 yards, 1:47.

Second quarter

- MER – Samuel Albee 6-yard pass from Jaylen King (Simon Zeidan kick), 6:07. Bears 27–0. Drive: 10 plays, 80 yards, 4:48.
- MER – Jaylen King 12-yard run (Simon Zeidan kick), 2:10. Bears 34–0. Drive: 2 plays, 14 yards, 0:29.
- PRES – Kade Bailey 38-yard field goal, 0:43. Bears 34–3. Drive: 9 plays, 54 yards, 1:27.
- MER – Travion Solomon 14-yard pass from Jaylen King (Simon Zeidan kick), 0:01. Bears 41–3. Drive: 4 plays, 56 yards, 0:33.

Third quarter

- MER – JP Pickles 26-yard run (Simon Zeidan kick), 0:54. Bears 48–3. Drive: 6 plays, 80 yards, 2:40.

Fourth quarter

- MER – Kel Calixte 12-yard pass from JP Pickles (Simon Zeidan kick), 11:09. Bears 55–3. Drive: 3 plays, 15 yards, 0:39.
- MER – Devon Caldwell 83-yard run (Sully Croker kick), 7:38. Bears 62–3. Drive: 1 play, 83 yards, 0:16.

Statistics	PRES	MER
First downs	19	24
Total yards	74–321	53–600
Rushing yards	39–105	33–329
Passing yards	216	271
Passing: Comp–Att–Int	21–35–0	15–20–0
Turnovers	1	0
Time of possession	31:51	23:43

Team	Category	Player	Statistics
Presbyterian	Passing	Landon Sharpe	17/29, 184 yards
Presbyterian	Rushing	Landon Sharpe	13 carries, 55 yards
Presbyterian	Receiving	Brice Johnson	7 receptions, 83 yards
Mercer	Passing	Jaylen King	12/15, 236 yards, 4 TD
Mercer	Rushing	Devon Caldwell	11 carries, 152 yards, TD
Mercer	Receiving	Brayden Smith	5 receptions, 132 yards, TD

=== at Western Carolina ===
Presbyterian Blue Hose (1–1) at Western Carolina Catamounts (1–2) – Game summary

Quarter	1	2	3	4	Total
Blue Hose	0	0	0	0	0
Catamounts	0	0	0	0	0

at E. J. Whitmire Stadium • Cullowhee, North Carolina

- Date: September 19
- Game time: 2:30 p.m.
- TV: ESPN+

Game information

First quarter
Second quarter
Third quarter
Fourth quarter

Statistics	PRES	WCU
First downs		
Plays–yards		
Rushes–yards		
Passing yards		
Passing: comp–att–int		
Turnovers		
Time of possession		

Team	Category	Player	Statistics
Presbyterian	Passing		
Presbyterian	Rushing		
Presbyterian	Receiving		
Western Carolina	Passing		
Western Carolina	Rushing		
Western Carolina	Receiving		

=== at Marist ===
Presbyterian Blue Hose (1–2) at Marist Red Foxes (1–2) – Game summary

Quarter	1	2	3	4	Total
Blue Hose	0	0	0	0	0
Red Foxes	0	0	0	0	0

at Leonidoff Field • Poughkeepsie, New York

- Date: September 26
- Game time: 12:00 p.m.
- TV announcers (ESPN+): Geoff Brault (play-by-play), Steve Eggink (analyst) and William Rosen (sideline)

Game information

First quarter
Second quarter
Third quarter
Fourth quarter

Statistics	PRES	MRST
First downs		
Plays–yards		
Rushes–yards		
Passing yards		
Passing: comp–att–int		
Turnovers		
Time of possession		

Team	Category	Player	Statistics
Presbyterian	Passing		
Presbyterian	Rushing		
Presbyterian	Receiving		
Marist	Passing		
Marist	Rushing		
Marist	Receiving		

=== St. Thomas (MN) ===
St. Thomas Tommies (4–1) at Presbyterian Blue Hose (1–3) – Game summary

Quarter	1	2	3	4	Total
Tommies	0	0	0	0	0
Blue Hose	0	0	0	0	0

at Bailey Memorial Stadium • Clinton, South Carolina

- Date: October 3
- Game time: 1:00 p.m.
- TV: ESPN+

Game information

First quarter
Second quarter
Third quarter
Fourth quarter

Statistics	STMN	PRES
First downs		
Plays–yards		
Rushes–yards		
Passing yards		
Passing: comp–att–int		
Turnovers		
Time of possession		

Team	Category	Player	Statistics
St. Thomas (MN)	Passing		
St. Thomas (MN)	Rushing		
St. Thomas (MN)	Receiving		
Presbyterian	Passing		
Presbyterian	Rushing		
Presbyterian	Receiving		

=== Davidson ===
Davidson Wildcats (2–4) at Presbyterian Blue Hose (2–3) – Game summary

Quarter	1	2	3	4	Total
Wildcats	0	0	0	0	0
Blue Hose	0	0	0	0	0

at Bailey Memorial Stadium • Clinton, South Carolina

- Date: October 10
- Game time: 5:30 p.m.
- TV: ESPN+

Game information

First quarter
Second quarter
Third quarter
Fourth quarter

Statistics	DAV	PRES
First downs		
Plays–yards		
Rushes–yards		
Passing yards		
Passing: comp–att–int		
Turnovers		
Time of possession		

Team	Category	Player	Statistics
Davidson	Passing		
Davidson	Rushing		
Davidson	Receiving		
Presbyterian	Passing		
Presbyterian	Rushing		
Presbyterian	Receiving		

=== at Stetson ===
Presbyterian Blue Hose (3–3) at Stetson Hatters (1–5) – Game summary

Quarter	1	2	3	4	Total
Blue Hose	0	0	0	0	0
Hatters	0	0	0	0	0

at Spec Martin Stadium • DeLand, Florida

- Date: October 17
- Game time: 2:00 p.m.
- TV: YouTube

Game information

First quarter
Second quarter
Third quarter
Fourth quarter

Statistics	PRES	STET
First downs		
Plays–yards		
Rushes–yards		
Passing yards		
Passing: comp–att–int		
Turnovers		
Time of possession		

Team	Category	Player	Statistics
Presbyterian	Passing		
Presbyterian	Rushing		
Presbyterian	Receiving		
Stetson	Passing		
Stetson	Rushing		
Stetson	Receiving		

=== at Valparaiso ===
Presbyterian Blue Hose (4–3) at Valparaiso Beacons (3–4) – Game summary

Quarter	1	2	3	4	Total
Blue Hose	0	0	0	0	0
Beacons	0	0	0	0	0

at Brown Field • Valparaiso, Indiana

- Date: October 24
- Game time: 1:00 p.m.
- TV: ESPN+

Game information

First quarter
Second quarter
Third quarter
Fourth quarter

Statistics	PRES	VAL
First downs		
Plays–yards		
Rushes–yards		
Passing yards		
Passing: comp–att–int		
Turnovers		
Time of possession		

Team	Category	Player	Statistics
Presbyterian	Passing		
Presbyterian	Rushing		
Presbyterian	Receiving		
Valparaiso	Passing		
Valparaiso	Rushing		
Valparaiso	Receiving		

=== Butler ===
Butler Bulldogs (6–2) at Presbyterian Blue Hose (4–4) – Game summary

Quarter	1	2	3	4	Total
Bulldogs	14	3	7	3	27
Blue Hose	0	3	7	0	10

at Bailey Memorial Stadium • Clinton, South Carolina

- Date: October 31
- Game time: 1:00 p.m.
- Game weather: Sunny • Temperature: 64 °F (18 °C) • Wind: NE at 9 miles per hour (14 km/h)
- Game attendance: 2,435
- Referee: Jeff Page
- TV announcers (ESPN+): Gabriel Schray (play-by-play) and Tim Webb (analyst)

Game information

First quarter

- (7:53) BUT – Desmin Jackson 4-yard run, Beck Janki kick (Drive: 11 plays, 82 yards, 7:02; Butler 7–0)
- (2:20) BUT – Drew Sullivan 21-yard pass from Gabe Passini, Beck Janki kick (Drive: 6 plays, 47 yards, 4:27; Butler 14–0)

Second quarter

- (2:35) PRES – Kade Bailey 28-yard field goal (Drive: 7 plays, 44 yards, 2:58; Butler 14–3)
- (0:00) BUT – Evan Windley 45-yard field goal (Drive: 11 plays, 50 yards, 2:30; Butler 17–3)

Third quarter

- (4:45) BUT – Gabe Passini 19-yard run, Beck Janki kick (Drive: 12 plays, 80 yards, 7:20; Butler 24–3)
- (2:45) PRES – Eric Nelson 66-yard pass from Noah Perrin, Kade Bailey kick (Drive: 7 plays, 83 yards, 1:56; Butler 24–10)

Fourth quarter

- (3:37) BUT – Beck Janki 22-yard field goal (Drive: 11 plays, 51 yards, 5:13; Butler 27–10)

Statistics	BUT	PRES
First downs	25	14
Plays–yards	73–394	50–207
Rushes–yards	47–249	28–87
Passing yards	145	120
Passing: comp–att–int	16–26–0	10–22–0
Turnovers	0	0
Time of possession	41:30	18:30

Team	Category	Player	Statistics
Butler	Passing	Gabe Passini	16/25, 145 yards, TD
Butler	Rushing	Gabe Passini	18 carries, 162 yards, TD
Butler	Receiving	Nick Munson	7 receptions, 50 yards
Presbyterian	Passing	Noah Perrin	1/1, 66 yards, TD
Presbyterian	Rushing	Damion Moate	8 carries, 34 yards
Presbyterian	Receiving	Eric Nelson	1 reception, 66 yards, TD

=== at Morehead State ===
Presbyterian Blue Hose (4–5) at Morehead State Eagles (2–8) – Game summary

Quarter	1	2	3	4	Total
Blue Hose	0	0	0	0	0
Eagles	0	0	0	0	0

at Phil Simms Stadium • Morehead, Kentucky

- Date: November 14
- Game time: 12:00 p.m.
- TV: ESPN+

Game information

First quarter
Second quarter
Third quarter
Fourth quarter

Statistics	PRES	MORE
First downs		
Plays–yards		
Rushes–yards		
Passing yards		
Passing: comp–att–int		
Turnovers		
Time of possession		

Team	Category	Player	Statistics
Presbyterian	Passing		
Presbyterian	Rushing		
Presbyterian	Receiving		
Morehead State	Passing		
Morehead State	Rushing		
Morehead State	Receiving		

=== No. 24 Dayton ===
No. 24 Dayton Flyers (9–1) at Presbyterian Blue Hose (4–6) – Game summary

Quarter	1	2	3	4	Total
No. 24 Flyers	0	0	0	0	0
Blue Hose	0	0	0	0	0

at Bailey Memorial Stadium • Clinton, South Carolina

- Date: November 21
- Game time: 1:00 p.m.
- TV: ESPN+

Game information

First quarter
Second quarter
Third quarter
Fourth quarter

Statistics	DAY	PRES
First downs		
Plays–yards		
Rushes–yards		
Passing yards		
Passing: comp–att–int		
Turnovers		
Time of possession		

Team	Category	Player	Statistics
Dayton	Passing		
Dayton	Rushing		
Dayton	Receiving		
Presbyterian	Passing		
Presbyterian	Rushing		
Presbyterian	Receiving		
