= 2026 Morehead State Eagles football team =

American college football season

2026 Morehead State Eagles football
- Conference: Pioneer Football League
- Record: 3–9 (2–6 PFL)
- Head coach: Jason Woodman (3rd season)
- Defensive coordinator: Wil Truelove (3rd season)
- Home stadium: Phil Simms Stadium

2026 Pioneer Football League standings
	Conf.			Overall
Team	W		L	W		L
No. 24 Dayton +^	7	–	1	10	–	1
Butler +	7	–	1	10	–	2
St. Thomas (MN)	6	–	2	9	–	3
San Diego	5	–	3	6	–	5
Marist	5	–	3	6	–	6
Valparaiso	4	–	4	5	–	6
Presbyterian	3	–	5	4	–	7
Drake	3	–	5	3	–	8
Davidson	2	–	6	4	–	8
Morehead State	2	–	6	3	–	9
Stetson	0	–	8	1	–	11
+ – Conference co-champions; ^ – FCS playoff participant; As of November 22, 2026; Rankings from STATS Poll

The 2026 Morehead State Eagles football team will represent Morehead State University as a member of the Pioneer Football League (PFL) during the 2026 NCAA Division I FCS football season. The Eagles are led by third-year head coach Jason Woodman and will play their home games at Phil Simms Stadium in Morehead, Kentucky.

== Schedule ==
Date	Time	Opponent	Site	TV	Result	Attendance
August 27	6:00 p.m.	Ohio Dominican*	Phil Simms Stadium; Morehead, KY	ESPN+	L 40–42 ^{3OT}	7,376
September 3	6:00 p.m.	Kentucky Christian*	Phil Simms Stadium; Morehead, KY	ESPN+	W 75–24	7,182
September 12	5:00 p.m.	at No. 15 Austin Peay*	Fortera Stadium; Clarksville, TN	ESPN+	L 7–63	6,657
September 19	7:00 p.m.	at Western Illinois*	Hanson Field; Macomb, IL	ESPN+	L 2–59	3,151
October 3	1:00 p.m.	Valparaiso	Phil Simms Stadium; Morehead, KY	ESPN+	L 3–37	4,128
October 10	12:00 p.m.	at Dayton	Welcome Stadium; Dayton, OH	ESPN+	L 28–56	3,084
October 17	1:00 p.m.	at Davidson	Davidson College Stadium; Davidson, NC	ESPN+	L 31–34 ^{OT}	
October 24	2:00 p.m.	Stetson^{†}	Phil Simms Stadium; Morehead, KY	ESPN+	W 38–31	7,317
October 31	1:00 p.m.	Drake	Phil Simms Stadium; Morehead, KY	ESPN+	L 35–45	4,202
November 7	12:00 p.m.	at Marist	Leonidoff Field; Poughkeepsie, NY	ESPN+	L 13–14	1,837
November 14	12:00 p.m.	Presbyterian	Phil Simms Stadium; Morehead, KY	ESPN+	W 28–25	3,303
November 21	1:00 p.m.	at Butler	Bud and Jackie Sellick Bowl; Indianapolis, IN	ESPN+	L 7–24	3,187
*Non-conference game; ^{†}Homecoming; Rankings from STATS Poll released prior to the game; All times are in Eastern time

== Game summaries ==
=== Ohio Dominican (DII) ===
Ohio Dominican Panthers (DII) (0–0) at Morehead State Eagles (0–0) – Game summary

Quarter	1	2	3	4	OT	2OT	3OT	Total
Panthers (DII)	7	7	14	6	0	6	2	42
Eagles	3	9	0	22	0	6	0	40

at Phil Simms Stadium • Morehead, Kentucky

- Date: August 27
- Game time: 6:00 p.m. EDT
- Game weather: Sunny • Temperature: 75 °F (24 °C) • Wind: NE at 10 miles per hour (16 km/h)
- Game attendance: 7,376
- Referee: Lance Mathis
- TV announcers (ESPN+): Jared Stacy and Mark Ledford

Game information

First quarter

- ODHM – Zack Stevens 17-yard pass from Carson Parker (Cameron Lytle kick), 9:14. Panthers 7–0. Drive: 10 plays, 95 yards, 4:02.
- MORE – Jordan Price 33-yard field goal, 2:22. Panthers 7–3. Drive: 12 plays, 49 yards, 6:52.

Second quarter

- ODHM – Mekhi Jenkins 12-yard run (Cameron Lytle kick), 12:55. Panthers 14–3. Drive: 5 plays, 48 yards, 1:53.
- MORE – David Parsons 4-yard run (two-point pass failed), 5:45. Panthers 14–9. Drive: 5 plays, 74 yards, 2:52.
- MORE – Jordan Price 35-yard field goal, 0:19. Panthers 14–12. Drive: 6 plays, 62 yards, 0:27.

Third quarter

- OHDM – Carson Parker 52-yard run (Cameron Lytle kick), 9:00. Panthers 21–12. Drive: 4 plays, 64 yards, 1:40.
- OHDM – Luke Hess 66-yard pass from Carson Parker (Cameron Lytle kick), 6:05. Panthers 28–12. Drive: 2 plays, 67 yards, 0:39.

Fourth quarter

- OHDM – Roderick Love 14-yard pass from Carson Parker (Cameron Lytle PAT failed), 14:51. Panthers 35–12. Drive: 11 plays, 77 yards, 3:07.
- MORE – Cannon Dinger 17-yard pass from David Parsons (Cannon Dinger–Riley Purcell pass), 13:33. Panthers 34–20. Drive: 5 plays, 75 yards, 1:18.
- MORE – Sam Harkness 18-yard pass from David Parsons (Jordan Price kick), 3:40. Panthers 34–27. Drive: 4 plays, 48 yards, 1:13.
- MORE – Anthony Ice 9-yard pass from David Parsons (Jordan Price kick), 1:07. Tied 34–34. Drive: 3 plays, 29 yards, 0:32.

Overtime

- No scoring plays.

Second overtime

- MORE – Anthony Ice 10-yard pass from Drew Parsons (two-point pass failed). Eagles 40–34. Drive: 3 plays, 25 yards.
- OHDM – Conner Campbell 27-yard pass from Carson Parker (two-point pass failed). Tied 40–40. Drive: 4 plays, 25 yards.

Third overtime

- OHDM – Carson Parker run for two-point conversion. Panthers 42–40.

Statistics	OHDM	MORE
First downs	23	29
Plays–yards	87–506	86–589
Rushes–yards	39–229	29–126
Passing yards	277	463
Passing: comp–att–int	23–48–0	30–57–3
Turnovers	1	4
Time of possession	27:43	32:17

Team	Category	Player	Statistics
Ohio Dominican	Passing	Carson Parker	23/48, 277 yards, 4 TD
Ohio Dominican	Rushing	Mekhi Jenkins	21 carries, 101 yards, TD
Ohio Dominican	Receiving	Luke Hess	4 receptions, 87 yards, TD
Morehead State	Passing	David Parsons	30/56, 463 yards, 4 TD, 3 INT
Morehead State	Rushing	Craig Cunningham	19 carries, 89 yards
Morehead State	Receiving	Anthony Ice	8 receptions, 156 yards, 2 TD

=== Kentucky Christian (NAIA) ===
Kentucky Christian Knights (NAIA) (1–0) at Morehead State Eagles (0–1) – Game summary

Quarter	1	2	3	4	Total
Knights (NAIA)	7	10	0	7	24
Eagles	27	41	0	7	75

at Phil Simms Stadium • Morehead, Kentucky

- Date: September 3
- Game time: 6:00 p.m. EDT
- Game weather: Clear • Temperature: 92 °F (33 °C) • Wind: S at 5 miles per hour (8.0 km/h)
- Game attendance: 7,182
- Referee: Bradley Eiras
- TV announcers (ESPN+): Jared Stacy and Mark Ledford

Game information

First quarter

- MORE – Cross Watson 60-yard pass from David Parsons (Jordan Price kick), 13:13. Eagles 7–0. Drive: 5 plays, 72 yards, 1:43.
- MORE – Cannon Dinger 27-yard pass from David Parsons (Jordan Price kick), 11:29. Eagles 14–0. Drive: 4 plays, 50 yards, 1:38.
- KCHR – Anthony Harris 100-yard kickoff return (Evan McGlothin kick), 11:10. Eagles 14–7.
- MORE – Cross Watson 60-yard pass from David Parsons (two-point pass failed), 7:01. Eagles 20–7. Drive: 7 plays, 62 yards, 4:01.
- MORE – Craig Cunningham 1-yard run (Jordan Price kick), 2:49. Eagles 27–7. Drive: 3 plays, 40 yards, 1:40.

Second quarter

- MORE – Craig Cunningham 1-yard run (Jordan Price kick), 14:50. Eagles 34–7. Drive: 3 plays, 33 yards, 1:19.
- KCHR – Evan McGlothin 25-yard field goal, 11:57. Eagles 34–10. Drive: 6 plays, 70 yards, 2:46.
- MORE – Cannon Dinger 8-yard pass from David Parsons (two-point run failed), 9:42. Eagles 40–10. Drive: 5 plays, 22 yards, 2:00.
- KCHR – Javion Martin 51-yard pass from Xavier Phillips (Evan McGlothin kick), 7:40. Eagles 40–17. Drive: 5 plays, 80 yards, 1:53.
- MORE – Anthony Ice 72-yard pass from David Parsons (Jordan Price kick), 7:03. Eagles 47–17. Drive: 2 plays, 75 yards, 0:37.
- MORE – Sidney Webb 39-yard interception return (Jordan Price kick), 5:52. Eagles 54–17.
- MORE – Isaiah Watts 47-yard interception return (Jordan Price kick), 2:49. Eagles 61–17.
- MORE – Cross Watson 40-yard pass from David Parsons (Jordan Price kick), 1:00. Eagles 68–17. Drive: 5 plays, 61 yards, 0:42.

Third quarter

- No scoring plays.

Fourth quarter

- MORE – Gabe Linkous 17-yard pass from Allen Fernett (Jordan Price kick), 10:47. Eagles 75–17. Drive: 5 plays, 35 yards, 1:57.
- KCHR – Sheldon Graham 67-yard interception return (Evan McGlothin kick), 3:21. Eagles 75–24.

Statistics	KCHR	MORE
First downs	13	24
Plays–yards	57–326	66–604
Rushes–yards	24–82	40–198
Passing yards	326	604
Passing: comp–att–int	20–33–3	18–26–1
Turnovers	3	1
Time of possession	28:22	31:38

Team	Category	Player	Statistics
Kentucky Christian	Passing	Xavier Phillips	20/33, 244 yards, TD, 3 INT
Kentucky Christian	Rushing	Amarion Grant	6 carries, 21 yards
Kentucky Christian	Receiving	Jakari Blackman	4 receptions, 94 yards
Morehead State	Passing	David Parsons	10/14, 304 yards, 5 TD
Morehead State	Rushing	David Parsons	2 carries, 36 yards
Morehead State	Receiving	Anthony Ice	5 receptions, 163 yards, TD

=== at No. 15 Austin Peay ===
Morehead State Eagles (1–1) at No. 15 Austin Peay Governors (1–1) – Game summary

Quarter	1	2	3	4	Total
Eagles	7	0	0	0	7
No. 15 Governors	14	35	7	7	63

at Fortera Stadium • Clarksville, Tennessee

- Date: September 12
- Game time: 5:00 p.m. EDT
- Game attendance: 6,657
- TV: ESPN+

Game information

First quarter
Second quarter
Third quarter
Fourth quarter

Statistics	MORE	APSU
First downs		
Plays–yards		
Rushes–yards		
Passing yards		
Passing: comp–att–int		
Turnovers		
Time of possession		

Team	Category	Player	Statistics
Morehead State	Passing		
Morehead State	Rushing		
Morehead State	Receiving		
Austin Peay	Passing		
Austin Peay	Rushing		
Austin Peay	Receiving		

=== at Western Illinois ===
Morehead State Eagles (1–2) at Western Illinois Leathernecks (1–2) – Game summary

Quarter	1	2	3	4	Total
Eagles	0	0	2	0	2
Leathernecks	14	17	14	14	59

at Hanson Field • Macomb, Illinois

- Date: September 19
- Game time: 7:00 p.m. EDT
- Game attendance: 3,151
- TV: ESPN+

Game information

First quarter
Second quarter
Third quarter
Fourth quarter

Statistics	MORE	WIU
First downs		
Plays–yards		
Rushes–yards		
Passing yards		
Passing: comp–att–int		
Turnovers		
Time of possession		

Team	Category	Player	Statistics
Morehead State	Passing		
Morehead State	Rushing		
Morehead State	Receiving		
Western Illinois	Passing		
Western Illinois	Rushing		
Western Illinois	Receiving		

=== Valparaiso ===
Valparaiso Beacons (1–3) at Morehead State Eagles (1–3) – Game summary

Quarter	1	2	3	4	Total
Beacons	7	6	14	10	37
Eagles	3	0	0	0	3

at Phil Simms Stadium • Morehead, Kentucky

- Date: October 3
- Game time: 1:00 p.m. EDT
- Game weather: Cloudy • Temperature: 69 °F (21 °C) • Wind: NW at 10 miles per hour (16 km/h)
- Game attendance: 4,128
- Referee: Gabriel Tomlin
- TV announcers (ESPN+): Jared Stacy (play-by-play) and Mark Ledford (analyst)

Game information

First quarter

- MOR – Jordan Price 28-yard field goal, 10:35. Eagles 3–0. Drive: 9 plays, 72 yards, 0:07.
- VAL – Chris Gundy 95-yard punt return (Luke Scoma kick), 5:53. Beacons 7–3.

Second quarter

- VAL – Luke Scoma 25-yard field goal, 8:41. Beacons 10–3. Drive: 7 plays, 16 yards, 3:09.
- VAL – Luke Scoma 21-yard field goal, 0:03. Beacons 13–3. Drive: 13 plays, 62 yards, 6:17.

Third quarter

- VAL – Daniel White 19-yard pass from Rowan Keefe (Luke Scoma kick), 7:46. Beacons 20–3. Drive: 6 plays, 27 yards, 3:11.
- VAL – Colin Hayes 7-yard pass from Rowan Keefe (Luke Scoma kick), 2:48. Beacons 27–3. Drive: 7 plays, 61 yards, 4:14.

Fourth quarter

- VAL – Cedric Benning III 1-yard run (Luke Scoma kick), 12:41. Beacons 34–3. Drive: 7 play, 53 yards, 3:20.
- VAL – Talan Samosky 26-yard field goal, 1:55. Beacons 37–3. Drive: 16 plays, 41 yards, 9:09.

Statistics	VAL	MORE
First downs	20	13
Plays–yards	74–389	53–251
Rushes–yards	46–161	23–137
Passing yards	228	114
Passing: comp–att–int	19–28–0	8–30–3
Turnovers	1	4
Time of possession	40:46	19:14

Team	Category	Player	Statistics
Valparaiso	Passing	Rowan Keefe	14/21, 174 yards, 2 TD
Valparaiso	Rushing	Cedric Benning III	19 carries, 91 yards, TD
Valparaiso	Receiving	Marty O'Keeffe	3 receptions, 90 yards
Morehead State	Passing	David Parsons	5/16, 83 yards, 2 INT
Morehead State	Rushing	Bryce Patterson	3 carries, 56 yards
Morehead State	Receiving	Cannon Dinger	3 receptions, 52 yards

=== at Dayton ===
Morehead State Eagles (1–4) at Dayton Flyers (3–1) – Game summary

Quarter	1	2	3	4	Total
Eagles	7	14	7	0	28
Flyers	14	7	14	21	56

at Welcome Stadium • Dayton, Ohio

- Date: October 10
- Game time: 12:00 p.m.
- Game attendance: 3,084
- TV: ESPN+

Game information

First quarter
Second quarter
Third quarter
Fourth quarter

Statistics	MORE	DAY
First downs		
Plays–yards		
Rushes–yards		
Passing yards		
Passing: comp–att–int		
Turnovers		
Time of possession		

Team	Category	Player	Statistics
Morehead State	Passing		
Morehead State	Rushing		
Morehead State	Receiving		
Dayton	Passing		
Dayton	Rushing		
Dayton	Receiving		

=== at Davidson ===
Morehead State Eagles (1–5) at Davidson Wildcats (2–5) – Game summary

Quarter	1	2	3	4	OT	Total
Eagles	7	10	7	7	0	31
Wildcats	14	0	7	10	3	34

at Davidson College Stadium • Davidson, North Carolina

- Date: October 17
- Game time: 1:00 p.m.
- TV: ESPN+

Game information

First quarter
Second quarter
Third quarter
Fourth quarter

Statistics	MORE	DAV
First downs		
Plays–yards		
Rushes–yards		
Passing yards		
Passing: comp–att–int		
Turnovers		
Time of possession		

Team	Category	Player	Statistics
Morehead State	Passing		
Morehead State	Rushing		
Morehead State	Receiving		
Davidson	Passing		
Davidson	Rushing		
Davidson	Receiving		

=== Stetson ===
Stetson Hatters (1–6) at Morehead State Eagles (1–6) – Game summary

Quarter	1	2	3	4	Total
Bulldogs	7	14	3	7	31
Eagles	14	0	10	14	38

at Phil Simms Stadium • Morehead, Kentucky

- Date: October 24
- Game time: 2:00 p.m. EDT
- Game attendance: 7,317
- TV: ESPN+

Game information

First quarter
Second quarter
Third quarter
Fourth quarter

Statistics	STET	MORE
First downs		
Plays–yards		
Rushes–yards		
Passing yards		
Passing: comp–att–int		
Turnovers		
Time of possession		

Team	Category	Player	Statistics
Stetson	Passing		
Stetson	Rushing		
Stetson	Receiving		
Morehead State	Passing		
Morehead State	Rushing		
Morehead State	Receiving		

=== Drake ===
Drake Bulldogs (2–6) at Morehead State Eagles (2–6) – Game summary

Quarter	1	2	3	4	Total
Bulldogs	7	10	0	28	45
Eagles	7	0	14	14	35

at Phil Simms Stadium • Morehead, Kentucky

- Date: October 31
- Game time: 1:00 p.m. EDT
- Game attendance: 4,202
- TV: ESPN+

Game information

First quarter
Second quarter
Third quarter
Fourth quarter

Statistics	DRKE	MORE
First downs		
Plays–yards		
Rushes–yards		
Passing yards		
Passing: comp–att–int		
Turnovers		
Time of possession		

Team	Category	Player	Statistics
Drake	Passing		
Drake	Rushing		
Drake	Receiving		
Morehead State	Passing		
Morehead State	Rushing		
Morehead State	Receiving		

=== at Marist ===
Morehead State Eagles (2–7) at Marist Red Foxes (4–5) – Game summary

Quarter	1	2	3	4	Total
Eagles	3	10	0	0	13
Red Foxes	0	0	0	14	14

at Leonidoff Field • Poughkeepsie, New York

- Date: November 7
- Game time: 12:00 p.m. EST
- Game attendance: 1,837
- TV: ESPN+

Statistics	MORE	MRST
First downs		
Plays–yards		
Rushes–yards		
Passing yards		
Passing: comp–att–int		
Time of possession		

Team	Category	Player	Statistics
Morehead State	Passing		
Morehead State	Rushing		
Morehead State	Receiving		
Marist	Passing		
Marist	Rushing		
Marist	Receiving		

=== Presbyterian ===
Presbyterian Blue Hose (4–5) at Morehead State Eagles (2–8) – Game summary

Quarter	1	2	3	4	Total
Blue Hose	7	3	0	15	25
Eagles	14	14	0	0	28

at Phil Simms Stadium • Morehead, Kentucky

- Date: November 14
- Game time: 12:00 p.m.
- Game attendance: 3,303
- TV: ESPN+

Game information

First quarter
Second quarter
Third quarter
Fourth quarter

Statistics	PRES	MORE
First downs		
Plays–yards		
Rushes–yards		
Passing yards		
Passing: comp–att–int		
Turnovers		
Time of possession		

Team	Category	Player	Statistics
Presbyterian	Passing		
Presbyterian	Rushing		
Presbyterian	Receiving		
Morehead State	Passing		
Morehead State	Rushing		
Morehead State	Receiving		

=== at Butler ===
Morehead State Eagles (3–8) at Butler Bulldogs (9–2) – Game summary

Quarter	1	2	3	4	Total
Eagles	0	0	7	0	7
Bulldogs	7	0	10	7	24

at Bud and Jackie Sellick Bowl • Indianapolis, Indiana

- Date: November 21
- Game time: 1:00 p.m.
- Game weather: Sunny • Temperature: 67 °F (19 °C)
- Game attendance: 3,167
- Referee: Carl Chapman
- TV announcers (ESPN+): Greg Rakestraw (play-by-play) and Will Hicks (analyst)

Game information

First quarter

- (4:05) BUT – Michael Dellumo 35-yard pass from Gabe Passini, Beck Janki kick (Drive: 8 plays, 70 yards, 4:46; Butler 7–0)

Second quarter

No scoring plays

Third quarter

- (12:03) BUT – Michael Dellumo 7-yard run, Beck Janki kick (Drive: 7 plays, 66 yards, 2:54; Butler 14–0)
- (3:58) BUT – Evan Windley 48-yard field goal (Drive: 7 plays, 15 yards, 3:17; Butler 17–0)
- (1:23) MORE – Riley Purcell 43-yard pass from David Parsons, Jordan Price kick (Drive: 5 plays, 75 yards, 2:35; Butler 17–7)

Fourth quarter

- (13:47) BUT – Desmin Jackson 20-yard run, Beck Janki kick (Drive: 6 plays, 64 yards, 2:32; Butler 24–7)

Statistics	MORE	BUT
First downs	16	19
Plays–yards	58–250	63–343
Rushes–yards	21–12	45–239
Passing yards	238	104
Passing: comp–att–int	22–37–2	6–18–0
Turnovers	2	0
Time of possession	26:39	33:21

Team	Category	Player	Statistics
Morehead State	Passing	David Parsons	22/37, 238 yards, TD, 2 INT
Morehead State	Rushing	Blake Fisher	10 carries, 12 yards
Morehead State	Receiving	Riley Purcell	3 receptions, 66 yards, TD
Butler	Passing	Gabe Passini	5/15, 87 yards, TD
Butler	Rushing	Desmin Jackson	20 carries, 121 yards, TD
Butler	Receiving	Michael Dellumo	1 reception, 35 yards, TD
