= 2025 Valparaiso Beacons football team =

American college football season

2025 Valparaiso Beacons football
- Conference: Pioneer Football League
- Record: 2–10 (1–7 PFL)
- Head coach: Andy Waddle (1st season)
- Offensive coordinator: Reed Florence (1st season)
- Defensive coordinator: Zach Feltrop (1st season)
- Home stadium: Brown Field

2025 Pioneer Football League standings
	Conf.			Overall
Team	W		L	W		L
Drake $^	7	–	1	8	–	4
Presbyterian	6	–	2	10	–	2
San Diego	6	–	2	8	–	4
St. Thomas	5	–	3	7	–	5
Dayton	5	–	3	7	–	4
Morehead State	4	–	4	6	–	6
Butler	4	–	4	6	–	6
Marist	3	–	5	5	–	7
Stetson	2	–	6	3	–	9
Davidson	1	–	7	2	–	10
Valparaiso	1	–	7	2	–	10
$ – Conference champion; ^ – FCS playoff participant; Rankings from STATS Poll

The 2025 Valparaiso Beacons football team represented Valparaiso University as a member of the Pioneer Football League (PFL) during the 2025 NCAA Division I FCS football season. The Beacons were led by first-year head coach Andy Waddle, who was assisted by first-year offensive coordinator Reed Florence and first-year defensive coordinator Zach Feltrop. Home games were played at Brown Field in Valparaiso, Indiana.

== Schedule ==
Date	Time	Opponent	Site	TV	Result	Attendance
August 30	1:00 p.m.	VUL*	Brown Field; Valparaiso, IN	ESPN+	W 67–10	1,640
September 6	6:00 p.m.	Adrian*	Brown Field; Valparaiso, IN	ESPN+	L 7–10	1,941
September 13	6:00 p.m.	at Western Illinois*	Hanson Field; Macomb, IL	ESPN+	L 30–51	572
September 20	3:00 p.m.	at No. 16 North Dakota*	Alerus Center; Grand Forks, ND	ESPN+	L 7–58	11,424
October 4	12:00 p.m.	at Drake	Drake Stadium; Des Moines, IA	ESPN+	L 0–41	4,007
October 11	1:00 p.m.	Dayton	Brown Field; Valparaiso, IN	ESPN+	L 10–41	1,405
October 18	1:00 p.m.	at St. Thomas	O'Shaughnessy Stadium; Saint Paul, MN	Midco Sports+	L 17–55	3,623
October 25	12:00 p.m.	Morehead State^{†}	Brown Field; Valparaiso, IN	ESPN+	L 13–17	1,897
November 1	12:00 p.m.	at No. 25 Presbyterian	Bailey Memorial Stadium; Clinton, SC	ESPN+	L 14–43	2,239
November 8	12:00 p.m.	San Diego	Brown Field; Valparaiso, IN	ESPN+	L 27–43	1,114
November 15	12:00 p.m.	Stetson	Brown Field; Valparaiso, IN	ESPN+	W 32–31 ^{OT}	1,356
November 22	12:00 p.m.	at Butler	Bud and Jackie Sellick Bowl; Indianapolis, IN (Hoosier Helmet Trophy)	FloFootball	L 20–27	1,938
*Non-conference game; ^{†}Homecoming; Rankings from STATS Poll released prior to the game; All times are in Central time

== Game summaries ==
=== VUL (NCCAA) ===
VUL Dragons (NCCAA) (0-0) vs. Valparaiso Beacons (0-0) – Game summary

Quarter	1	2	3	4	Total
Dragons (NCCAA)	0	10	0	0	10
Beacons	13	13	35	6	67

at Brown Field • Valparaiso, IN

- Date: August 30
- Game time: 1:00 PM CDT
- Game attendance: 1,640
- Referee: Timothy Duffy
- TV announcers (ESPN+): Todd Ickow (play-by-play) and Tom Byrne (analyst)
- Box Score

Game information

First Quarter

- VAL – Michael Mansaray 49 Yd Run (Two-Point Run Conversion Failed). Valparaiso 0–6 Drive: 1 play, 49 yards, 0:12
- VAL – Ryan Ricketti 10 Yd pass from Caron Tyler (Luke Scoma Kick). Valparaiso 0–13 Drive: 7 plays, 78 yards, 2:43

Second Quarter

- VUL – Jacob Briggeman 36 Yd Field Goal. Valparaiso 3–13 Drive: 18 plays, 56 yards, 7:34
- VAL – Luke Scoma 43 Yd Field Goal. Valparaiso 3–16 Drive: 4 plays, -1 yard, 0:54
- VAL – Michael Mansaray 5 Yd Run (Luke Scoma Kick). Valparaiso 3–23 Drive: 1 play, 5 yards, 0:05
- VUL – Kevon Gregory 40 Yd Interception Return (Jacob Briggeman Kick). Valparaiso 10–23 Drive: 2 plays, 3 yards, 0:51
- VAL – Luke Scoma 31 Yd Field Goal. Valparaiso 10–26 Drive: 8 plays, 45 yards, 3:41

Third Quarter

- VAL – Colin Hayes 17 Yd pass from Rowan Keefe (Luke Scoma Kick). Valparaiso 10–33 Drive: 8 plays, 68 yards, 4:48
- VAL – Frank Bartell 0 Yd Return of Blocked Punt (Luke Scoma Kick). Valparaiso 10–40 Drive: 3 plays, 0 yards, 1:37
- VAL – Anthony Feltrinelli 10 Yd Fumble Return (Luke Scoma Kick). Valparaiso 10–47 Drive: 1 play, 4 yards, 0:07
- VAL – Dawaiian McNeely 17 Yd Run (Luke Scoma Kick). Valparaiso 10–54 Drive: 4 plays, 38 yards, 2:22
- VAL – Rowan Keefe 13 Yd Run (Liam Shepherd Kick). Valparaiso 10-61 Drive: 2 plays, 22 yards, 0:47

Fourth Quarter

- VAL – Noah Long 26 Yd Run (Two-Point Pass Conversion Failed). Valparaiso 10–67 Drive: 5 plays, 60 yards, 3:21

Statistics	VUL	VAL
First downs	10	20
Total yards	161	411
Rushing yards	25	298
Passing yards	136	113
Passing: Comp–Att–Int	16–29–2	10–16–1
Time of possession	29:55	30:05

Team	Category	Player	Statistics
VUL	Passing	Max Zavala	12/22, 68 yards, 2 INT
VUL	Rushing	Jacob Newman	13 carries, 40 yards
VUL	Receiving	Montell Wright	4 receptions, 75 yards
Valparaiso	Passing	Caron Tyler	5/7, 57 yards, TD
Valparaiso	Rushing	Michael Mansaray	15 carries, 134 yards, 2 TD
Valparaiso	Receiving	Jay Melchiori	3 receptions, 41 yards

=== Adrian (DIII) ===
Adrian Bulldogs (DIII) (0-0) vs. Valparaiso Beacons (1-0) – Game summary

Quarter	1	2	3	4	Total
Bulldogs (DIII)	0	3	0	7	10
Beacons	0	0	0	7	7

at Brown Field • Valparaiso, IN

- Date: September 6
- Game time: 6:00 PM CDT
- Game attendance: 1,941
- Referee: Michael Hoffman
- TV announcers (ESPN+): Todd Ickow (play-by-play) and Brett Jennings (analyst)

Game information

First Quarter

No scoring plays.

Second Quarter

ADR – Jack Boike 33 Yd Field Goal. Adrian 3–0. Drive: 17 plays, 60 yards, 6:22

Third Quarter

No scoring plays.

Fourth Quarter

VAL – Dawaiian McNeely 3 Yd Run (Luke Scoma Kick). Valparaiso 3–7. Drive: 11 plays, 80 yards, 5:35

ADR – Ethan Abberger 26 Yd pass from Noah Beaudrie (Jack Boike Kick). Adrian 10–7. Drive: 4 plays, 83 yards, 0:54

Statistics	ADR	VAL
First downs	16	15
Total yards	283	254
Rushing yards	109	101
Passing yards	174	153
Passing: Comp–Att–Int	17–24–0	15–19–3
Time of possession	30:25	29:35

Team	Category	Player	Statistics
Adrian	Passing	Noah Beaudrie	16/23, 183 yards, TD
Adrian	Rushing	Trey Brueggemann	22 carries, 79 yards
Adrian	Receiving	Ethan Abberger	6 receptions, 79 yards
Valparaiso	Passing	Rowan Keefe	15/19, 153 yards, 3 INT
Valparaiso	Rushing	Noah Long	11 carries, 57 yards
Valparaiso	Receiving	Jay Melchiori	4 receptions, 66 yards

=== at Western Illinois ===
Valparaiso Beacons (1-1) vs. Western Illinois Leathernecks (0-2) – Game summary

Quarter	1	2	3	4	Total
Beacons	0	3	7	20	30
Leathernecks	7	21	16	7	51

at Hanson Field • Macomb, IL

- Date: September 13
- Game time: 6:00 PM CDT
- Game attendance: 572
- TV announcers (ESPN+): Russ Eisenstein (play-by-play), Aiden Dersien (analyst) and Caiden Strenz (sideline)

Statistics	VAL	WIU
First downs	15	29
Total yards	316	570
Rushing yards	124	306
Passing yards	192	264
Passing: Comp–Att–Int	15-26-0	14-22-2
Time of possession	30:26	29:34

Team	Category	Player	Statistics
Valparaiso	Passing	Caron Tyler	10/16, 137 yards, 1 TD
Valparaiso	Rushing	Caron Tyler	12 carries, 79 yards
Valparaiso	Receiving	Chris Gundy	5 receptions, 86 yards, 1 TD
Western Illinois	Passing	Chris Irvin	13/19, 250 yards, 3 TD, 1 INT
Western Illinois	Rushing	Markell Holman	19 carries, 139 yards, 1 TD
Western Illinois	Receiving	Demari Davis	4 receptions, 99 yards, 1 TD

=== at No. 16 North Dakota ===
Valparaiso Beacons (1-2) vs. No. 16 North Dakota Fighting Hawks (1-2) – Game summary

Quarter	1	2	3	4	Total
Beacons	0	0	7	0	7
No. 16 Fighting Hawks	7	17	14	10	48

at Alerus Center, Grand Forks, ND

- Date: September 20
- Game time: 3:00 PM CDT
- Game weather: Indoors • Temperature: 70 °F (21 °C)
- Game attendance: 11,424
- Referee: John Shay
- TV announcers (ESPN+): Brian Shawn (play-by-play) and Ryan Kasowski (analyst)

Game information
First quarter
- (7:45) UND – Sawyer Seidl 7-yard run, C.J. Elrichs kick (Drive: 10 plays, 85 yards, 5:07; North Dakota 7–0)

Second quarter

- (9:40) UND – Deng Deng 2-yard pass from Jerry Kaminski, C.J. Elrichs kick (Drive: 8 plays, 59 yards, 4:21; North Dakota 14–0)
- (0:55) UND – Sawyer Seidl 20-yard pass from Jerry Kaminski, C.J. Elrichs kick (Drive: 6 plays, 57 yards, 1:22; North Dakota 21–0)
- (0:00) C.J. Elrichs 38-yard field goal (Drive: 4 plays, 30 yards, 0:21; North Dakota 24–0)

Third quarter

- (11:59) VAL – Micah Mackay 67-yard pass from Rowan Keefe, Luke Scoma kick (Drive: 3 plays, 80 yards, 0:56; North Dakota 24–7)
- (11:47) UND – Sawyer Seidl 92-yard kickoff return, C.J. Elrichs kick (North Dakota 31–7)
- (7:40) UND – Simon Romfo 5-yard run, C.J. Elrichs kick (Drive: 5 plays, 44 yards, 2:26; North Dakota 38–7)
- (6:56) UND – Xavier Leigh 23-yard run, C.J. Elrichs kick (Drive: 2 plays, 27 yards, 0:35; North Dakota 45–7)
- (4:10) UND – C.J. Elrichs 38-yard field goal (Drive: 4 plays, 0 yards, 0:49; North Dakota 48–7)

Fourth quarter

- (13:27) UND – C.J. Elrichs 32-yard field goal (Drive: 9 plays, 48 yards, 3:20; North Dakota 51–7)
- (12:07) Javance Tupou'ata-Johnson 5-yard run, C.J. Elrichs kick (Drive: 1 play, 5 yards, 0:05; North Dakota 58–7)

Statistics	VAL	UND
First downs	6	24
Total yards	159	448
Rushing yards	48	228
Passing yards	111	220
Passing: Comp–Att–Int	8–19–1	18–30–0
Time of possession	30:16	29:44

Team	Category	Player	Statistics
Valparaiso	Passing	Rowan Keefe	8/15, 111 yards, TD, INT
Valparaiso	Rushing	Dawaiian McNeely	7 carries, 17 yards
Valparaiso	Receiving	Micah Mackay	1 reception, 67 yards, TD
North Dakota	Passing	Jerry Kaminski	13/19, 172 yards, 2 TD
North Dakota	Rushing	Xavier Leigh	8 carries, 64 yards, TD
North Dakota	Receiving	Nate DeMontagnac	4 receptions, 50 yards

=== at Drake ===
Valparaiso Beacons (1-3) vs. Drake Bulldogs (1-2) – Game summary

Quarter	1	2	3	4	Total
Beacons	0	0	0	0	0
Bulldogs	3	10	21	7	41

at Drake Stadium • Des Moines, IA

- Date: October 4
- Game time: 12:00 p.m. CDT
- TV announcers (ESPN+): Michael Admire (play-by-play) and Sage Rosenfels (analyst)

Game information

First Quarter

- (9:17) DRKE – Harry Balke 34-yard Field Goal (Drive: 7 plays, 70 yards, 2:46; Drake 0–3)

Second Quarter

- (10:39) DRKE – Luke Woodson 2-yard Run, Harry Balke Kick (Drive: 5 plays, 31 yards, 2:47; Drake 0–10)
- (1:39) DRKE – Harry Balke 38-yard Field Goal (Drive: 14 plays, 39 yards, 4:27; Drake 0–13)

Third Quarter

- (3:36) DRKE – Nick Herman 1-yard Run, Harry Balke Kick (Drive: 10 plays, 72 yards, 4:51; Drake 0–27)
- (0:52) DRKE – Nick Herman 27-yard Run, Harry Balke Kick (Drive: 2 plays, 37 yards, 0:43; Drake 0–34)

Fourth Quarter

- (3:32) DRKE – Hank Foley 25-yard pass from Logan Inagawa, Harry Balke Kick (Drive: 4 plays, 34 yards, 2:50; Drake 0–41)

Statistics	VAL	DRKE
First downs	11	19
Total yards	105	334
Rushing yards	32	150
Passing yards	73	184
Passing: Comp–Att–Int	10–23–3	16–26–1
Time of possession	28:52	31:08

Team	Category	Player	Statistics
Valparaiso	Passing	Tyler Caron	5/9, 42 yards
Valparaiso	Rushing	Dawaiian McNeeley	12 carries, 23 yards
Valparaiso	Receiving	Devin Yeats	4 catches, 34 yards
Drake	Passing	Chase Spellman	10/19, 128 yards, 1 INT
Drake	Rushing	Nick Herman	7 carries, 53 yards, 2 TD
Drake	Receiving	Taj Hughes	3 catches, 74 yards

=== Dayton ===
Dayton Flyers (4-2) vs. Valparaiso Beacons (1-4) – Game summary

Quarter	1	2	3	4	Total
Flyers	14	27	0	0	41
Beacons	0	0	0	10	10

at Brown Field • Valparaiso, IN

- Date: October 11
- Game time: 1:00 PM CDT
- TV announcers (ESPN+): Todd Ickow (play-by-play) and Tom Byrne (analyst)

Statistics	DAY	VAL
First downs		
Total yards		
Rushing yards		
Passing yards		
Passing: Comp–Att–Int		
Time of possession		

Team	Category	Player	Statistics
Dayton	Passing		
Dayton	Rushing		
Dayton	Receiving		
Valparaiso	Passing		
Valparaiso	Rushing		
Valparaiso	Receiving		

=== at St. Thomas (MN) ===
Valparaiso Beacons (1-5) vs. St. Thomas Tommies (3-3) – Game summary

Quarter	1	2	3	4	Total
Beacons	-	-	-	-	0
Tommies	-	-	-	-	0

at O'Shaughnessy Stadium • Saint Paul, MN

- Date: October 18
- Game time: 1:00 PM CDT

Statistics	VAL	STMN
First downs		
Total yards		
Rushing yards		
Passing yards		
Passing: Comp–Att–Int		
Time of possession		

Team	Category	Player	Statistics
Valparaiso	Passing		
Valparaiso	Rushing		
Valparaiso	Receiving		
St. Thomas (MN)	Passing		
St. Thomas (MN)	Rushing		
St. Thomas (MN)	Receiving		

=== Morehead State ===
Morehead State Eagles (3-5) vs. Valparaiso Beacons (1-6) – Game summary

Quarter	1	2	3	4	Total
Eagles	-	-	-	-	0
Beacons	-	-	-	-	0

at Brown Field • Valparaiso, IN

- Date: October 25
- Game time: 12:00 PM CDT

Statistics	MORE	VAL
First downs		
Total yards		
Rushing yards		
Passing yards		
Passing: Comp–Att–Int		
Time of possession		

Team	Category	Player	Statistics
Morehead State	Passing		
Morehead State	Rushing		
Morehead State	Receiving		
Valparaiso	Passing		
Valparaiso	Rushing		
Valparaiso	Receiving		

=== at No. 25 Presbyterian ===
Valparaiso Beacons (1-7) vs. No. 25 Presbyterian Blue Hose (7-1) – Game summary

Quarter	1	2	3	4	Total
Beacons	-	-	-	-	0
No. 25 Blue Hose	-	-	-	-	0

at Bailey Memorial Stadium • Clinton, SC

- Date: November 1
- Game time: 1:00 PM EDT

Statistics	VAL	PRES
First downs		
Total yards		
Rushing yards		
Passing yards		
Passing: Comp–Att–Int		
Time of possession		

Team	Category	Player	Statistics
Valparaiso	Passing		
Valparaiso	Rushing		
Valparaiso	Receiving		
Presbyterian	Passing		
Presbyterian	Rushing		
Presbyterian	Receiving		

=== San Diego ===
San Diego Toreros (5-4) vs. Valparaiso Beacons (1-8) – Game summary

Quarter	1	2	3	4	Total
Toreros	-	-	-	-	0
Beacons	-	-	-	-	0

at Brown Field • Valparaiso, IN

- Date: November 8
- Game time: 3:00 PM CST

Statistics	USD	VAL
First downs		
Total yards		
Rushing yards		
Passing yards		
Passing: Comp–Att–Int		
Time of possession		

Team	Category	Player	Statistics
San Diego	Passing		
San Diego	Rushing		
San Diego	Receiving		
Valparaiso	Passing		
Valparaiso	Rushing		
Valparaiso	Receiving		

=== Stetson ===
Stetson Hatters (0-0) vs. Valparaiso Beacons (0-0) – Game summary

Quarter	1	2	3	4	Total
Hatters	-	-	-	-	0
Beacons	-	-	-	-	0

at Brown Field • Valparaiso, IN

- Date: November 15
- Game time: 12:00 PM CST

Statistics	STET	VAL
First downs		
Total yards		
Rushing yards		
Passing yards		
Passing: Comp–Att–Int		
Time of possession		

Team	Category	Player	Statistics
Stetson	Passing		
Stetson	Rushing		
Stetson	Receiving		
Valparaiso	Passing		
Valparaiso	Rushing		
Valparaiso	Receiving		

=== Butler (Hoosier Helmet Trophy) ===
Valparaiso Beacons (2-9) vs. Butler Bulldogs (5-6) – Game summary

Quarter	1	2	3	4	Total
Beacons	7	0	0	13	20
Bulldogs	7	20	0	0	27

at Bud and Jackie Sellick Bowl • Indianapolis, IN

- Date: November 22
- Game time: 1:00 PM EST
- Game weather: Sunny • Temperature: 50 °F (10 °C)
- Game attendance: 1,938
- Referee: Gregory Gompf
- TV announcers (FloCollege): Jack Barry (play-by-play) and Drew Pieschalski (analyst)
- Box Score

Game information

First Quarter

- (10:56) BUT – Griffin Caldwell 8-yard pass from Reagan Andrew, Ryan Short kick (Drive: 7 plays, 65 yards, 4:04; Butler 7–0)
- (7:29) VAL – Ryan Ricketti 4-yard pass from Rowan Keefe, Luke Scoma kick (Drive: 5 plays, 97 yards, 3:07; Tied 7–7)

Second Quarter

- (9:16) BUT – Gabe Passini 4-yard run, Ryan Short kick (Drive: 4 plays, 35 yards, 1:58; Butler 14–7)
- (7:35) BUT – Ryan Short 25-yard field goal (Drive: 4 plays, 3 yards, 1:28; Butler 17–7)
- (3:43) BUT – Ershod Jasey II 49-yard pass from Gabe Passini, Ryan Short kick (Drive: 3 plays, 97 yards, 1:38; Butler 24–7)
- (0:18) BUT – Ryan Short 32-yard field goal (Drive: 10 plays, 46 yards, 2:08; Butler 27–7)

Third Quarter

No scoring plays

Fourth Quarter

- (12:01) VAL – Devin Yeats 13-yard pass from Rowan Keefe, Liam Shepherd kick blocked (Drive: 12 plays, 99 yards, 5:09; Butler 27–13)
- (3:07) VAL – Colin Hayes 7-yard pass from Rowan Keefe, Liam Shepherd kick (Drive: 8 plays, 68 yards, 3:44; Butler 27–20)

Statistics	VAL	BUT
First downs	18	24
Total yards	326	431
Rushing yards	142	275
Passing yards	184	156
Passing: Comp–Att–Int	18–28–0	12–19–2
Time of possession	26:19	33:41

Team	Category	Player	Statistics
Valparaiso	Passing	Rowan Keefe	18/28, 184 yards, 3 TD
Valparaiso	Rushing	Rowan Keefe	10 carries, 78 yards
Valparaiso	Receiving	Devin Yeats	6 receptions, 73 yards, TD
Butler	Passing	Gabe Passini	10/17, 140 yards, TD, 2 INT
Butler	Rushing	Gabe Passini	19 carries, 106 yards, TD
Butler	Receiving	Ershod Jasey II	1 reception, 49 yards, TD
