= 2026 Stetson Hatters football team =

American college football season

2026 Stetson Hatters football
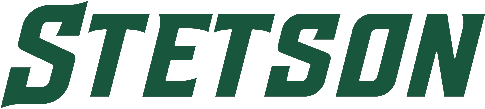
- Conference: Pioneer Football League
- Record: 1–11 (0–8 PFL)
- Head coach: Michael Jasper (2nd season)
- Offensive coordinator: Jarod Dodson (2nd season)
- Defensive coordinator: Dustin Kincaid (2nd season)
- Home stadium: Spec Martin Stadium

2026 Pioneer Football League standings
	Conf.			Overall
Team	W		L	W		L
No. 24 Dayton +^	7	–	1	10	–	1
Butler +	7	–	1	10	–	2
St. Thomas (MN)	6	–	2	9	–	3
San Diego	5	–	3	6	–	5
Marist	5	–	3	6	–	6
Valparaiso	4	–	4	5	–	6
Presbyterian	3	–	5	4	–	7
Drake	3	–	5	3	–	8
Davidson	2	–	6	4	–	8
Morehead State	2	–	6	3	–	9
Stetson	0	–	8	1	–	11
+ – Conference co-champions; ^ – FCS playoff participant; As of November 22, 2026; Rankings from STATS Poll

The 2026 Stetson Hatters football team represented Stetson University as a member of the Pioneer Football League (PFL) during the 2026 NCAA Division I FCS football season. They were led by second-year head coach Michael Jasper. The Hatters played their home games at Spec Martin Stadium in DeLand, Florida.

== Schedule ==
Date	Time	Opponent	Site	TV	Result	Attendance
August 29	7:00 p.m.	at No. 3 South Dakota State*	Dana J. Dykhouse Stadium; Brookings, SD	ESPN+	L 7–70	19,192
September 5	11:00 a.m.	Webber International*	Spec Martin Stadium; DeLand, FL	YouTube	W 45–10	2,064
September 12	4:00 p.m.	at Bethune–Cookman*	Daytona Stadium; Daytona Beach, FL	SWAC TV	L 18–43	3,921
September 19	10:00 p.m.	at No. 11 UC Davis*	UC Davis Health Stadium; Davis, CA	ESPN+	L 7–45	15,270
October 3	1:00 p.m.	Marist	Spec Martin Stadium; DeLand, FL	YouTube	L 14–28	2,177
October 10	2:00 p.m.	at St. Thomas (MN)	O'Shaughnessy Stadium; Saint Paul, MN	MidCoSports+	L 21–64	3,840
October 17	2:00 p.m.	Presbyterian	Spec Martin Stadium; DeLand, FL	YouTube	L 43–47	2,253
October 24	2:00 p.m.	at Morehead State	Phil Simms Stadium; Morehead, KY	ESPN+	L 31–38	7,317
October 31	1:00 p.m.	Dayton	Spec Martin Stadium; DeLand, FL	YouTube	L 34–44	1,568
November 7	1:00 p.m.	at Davidson	Davidson College Stadium; Davidson, NC	ESPN+	L 14–33	2,268
November 14	1:00 p.m.	Valparaiso	Spec Martin Stadium; DeLand, FL	YouTube	L 31–34	1,877
November 21	8:00 p.m.	at San Diego	Torero Stadium; San Diego, CA	ESPN+	L 21–59	
*Non-conference game; Rankings from STATS Poll released prior to the game; All times are in Eastern time

== Game summaries ==
=== at No. 3 South Dakota State ===
Stetson Hatters (0–0) at No. 3 South Dakota State Jackrabbits (0–0) – Game summary

Quarter	1	2	3	4	Total
Hatters	0	0	7	0	7
No. 3 Jackrabbits	21	21	28	0	70

at Dana J. Dykhouse Stadium • Brookings, South Dakota

- Date: August 29, 2026
- Game time: 7:00 p.m. EDT
- Game weather: Clear • Temperature: 83 °F (28 °C) • Wind: N at 5 miles per hour (8.0 km/h)
- Game attendance: 19,192
- Referee: Carl Chapman
- TV announcers (ESPN+): Tyler Merriam and Kurtiss Riggs

Game information

First quarter

- SDST – Jack Smith 73-yard pass from Chase Mason (Tristan Alvano kick), 13:32. Jackrabbits 7–0. Drive: 1 play, 73 yards, 0:10.
- SDST – Corey Blair Jr. 10-yard run (Tristan Alvano kick), 12:04. Jackrabbits 14–0. Drive: 4 plays, 27 yards, 1:20.
- SDST – Josiah Johnson 20-yard run (Tristan Alvano kick), 0:28. Jackrabbits 21–0. Drive: 5 plays, 53 yards, 2:34.

Second quarter

- SDST – Alex Uchtman 65-yard punt return (Tristan Alvano kick), 13:30. Jackrabbits 28–0.
- SDST – Josiah Johnson 6-yard run (Tristan Alvano kick), 12:34. Jackrabbits 35–0. Drive: 2 plays, 8 yards, 0:44.
- SDST – Ramon McKinney Jr. 27-yard run (Tristan Alvano kick), 2:16. Jackrabbits 42–0. Drive: 11 plays, 92 yards, 5:24.

Third quarter

- SDST – Corey Blair Jr. 52-yard run (Tristan Alvano kick), 14:42. Jackrabbits 49–0. Drive: 1 play, 52 yards, 0:10.
- SDST – Landon Dulaney 78-yard pass from Josh Holst (Tristan Alvano kick), 13:29. Jackrabbits 56–0. Drive: 1 play, 78 yards, 0:12.
- SDST – James Basinger 6-yard run (Tristan Alvano kick), 8:22. Jackrabbits 63–0. Drive: 5 plays, 69 yards, 2:59.
- STET – Chris Stephenson 3-yard run (Paul DeSousa kick), 3:37. Jackrabbits 63–7. Drive: 8 plays, 75 yards, 4:45.
- SDST – Josh Myers 27-yard run (Tristan Alvano kick), 0:15. Jackrabbits 70–7. Drive: 5 plays, 70 yards, 3:18.

Fourth quarter

- No scoring plays.

Statistics	STET	SDST
First downs	15	25
Plays–yards	66–265	56–628
Rushes–yards	34–108	45–393
Passing yards	157	235
Passing: comp–att–int	21–32–0	6–11–0
Turnovers	2	0
Time of possession	30:34	29:26

Team	Category	Player	Statistics
Stetson	Passing	Thomas von Grote	17/26, 95 yards
Stetson	Rushing	Chris Stephenson	13 carries, 69 yards, TD
Stetson	Receiving	Malachi Townsend	5 receptions, 44 yards
South Dakota State	Passing	Chase Mason	5/10, 157 yards, TD
South Dakota State	Rushing	James Basinger	8 carries, 110 yards, TD
South Dakota State	Receiving	Landon Dulaney	2 receptions, 89 yards, TD

=== Webber International (NAIA) ===
Webber International Warriors (NAIA) (0–0) at Stetson Hatters (0–0) – Game summary

Quarter	1	2	3	4	Total
Warriors (NAIA)	0	0	0	10	10
Hatters	14	10	7	14	45

at Spec Martin Stadium • DeLand, Florida

- Date: September 5
- Game time: 11:00 a.m.
- Game weather: Sunny • Temperature: 90 °F (32 °C) • Wind: W at 6 miles per hour (9.7 km/h)
- Game attendance: 2,064
- Referee: Michael Lennie
- TV: YouTube

Game information

First quarter

- STET – Troy Flowers 81-yard pass from Thomas von Grote (Daniel Holbrook kick), 13:34. Hatters 7–0. Drive: 3 plays, 84 yards, 1:26.
- STET – Michael Dempsey 2-yard run (Paul DeSousa kick), 7:05. Hatters 14–0. Drive: 8 plays, 62 yards, 3:28.

Second quarter

- STET – Wyatt Rogers 46-yard pass from Thomas von Grote (Paul DeSousa kick), 10:23. Hatters 21–0. Drive: 8 plays, 71 yards, 4:20.
- STET – Paul DeSousa 49-yard field goal, 0:26. Hatters 24–0. Drive: 17 plays, 59 yards, 7:30.

Third quarter

- STET – Shawne Jones 22-yard pass from Thomas von Grote (Paul DeSousa kick), 8:42. Hatters 31–0. Drive: 7 plays, 50 yards, 3:00.

Fourth quarter

- WEBB – Tyler Sapp 38-yard field goal, 10:24. Hatters 31–3. Drive: 15 plays, 59 yards, 10:27.
- STET – Chris Stephenson 57-yard run (Paul DeSousa kick), 9:09. Hatters 38–3. Drive: 3 plays, 65 yards, 1:15.
- STET – Chris Stephenson 57-yard run (Paul DeSousa kick), 5:26. Hatters 45–3. Drive: 3 plays, 60 yards, 1:07.
- WEBB – Zachariah Ray 5-yard run (Tyler Sapp kick), 1:45. Hatters 45–10. Drive: 8 plays, 65 yards, 3:41.

Statistics	WEBB	STET
First downs	13	18
Plays–yards	55–185	60–500
Rushes–yards	40–139	36–180
Passing yards	46	320
Passing: comp–att–int	4–15–1	19–24–0
Turnovers	1	0
Time of possession	32:16	27:44

Team	Category	Player	Statistics
Webber International	Passing	Trent Grotjan	4/14, 46 yards, INT
Webber International	Rushing	D'Markus Mathis	14 carries, 51 yards
Webber International	Receiving	Kendall Johnson	1 reception, 17 yards
Stetson	Passing	Thomas von Grote	19/24, 320 yards, 3 TD
Stetson	Rushing	Chris Stephenson	3 carries, 113 yards, 2 TD
Stetson	Receiving	Wyatt Rogers	5 receptions, 123 yards, TD

=== at Bethune-Cookman ===
Stetson Hatters (1–1) at Bethune-Cookman Wildcats (0–1) – Game summary

Quarter	1	2	3	4	Total
Hatters	0	0	0	0	0
Wildcats	0	0	0	0	0

at Daytona Stadium • Daytona Beach, Florida

- Date: September 12
- Game time: 4:00 p.m.
- TV: SWAC TV

Game information

First quarter
Second quarter
Third quarter
Fourth quarter

Statistics	STET	BCU
First downs		
Plays–yards		
Rushes–yards		
Passing yards		
Passing: comp–att–int		
Turnovers		
Time of possession		

Team	Category	Player	Statistics
Stetson	Passing		
Stetson	Rushing		
Stetson	Receiving		
Bethune–Cookman	Passing		
Bethune–Cookman	Rushing		
Bethune–Cookman	Receiving		

=== at No. 11 UC Davis ===
Stetson Hatters (1–2) at No. 11 UC Davis Aggies (2–1) – Game summary

Quarter	1	2	3	4	Total
Hatters	0	0	0	0	0
No. 11 Aggies	0	0	0	0	0

at UC Davis Health Stadium • Davis, California

- Date: September 19
- Game time: 10:00 p.m. EDT
- TV: ESPN+

Game information

First quarter
Second quarter
Third quarter
Fourth quarter

Statistics	STET	UCD
First downs		
Plays–yards		
Rushes–yards		
Passing yards		
Passing: comp–att–int		
Turnovers		
Time of possession		

Team	Category	Player	Statistics
Stetson	Passing		
Stetson	Rushing		
Stetson	Receiving		
UC Davis	Passing		
UC Davis	Rushing		
UC Davis	Receiving		

=== Marist ===
Marist Red Foxes (2–2) at Stetson Hatters (1–3) – Game summary

Quarter	1	2	3	4	Total
Red Foxes	0	0	0	0	0
Hatters	0	0	0	0	0

at Spec Martin Stadium • DeLand, Florida

- Date: October 3
- Game time: 1:00 p.m.

Game information

First quarter
Second quarter
Third quarter
Fourth quarter

Statistics	MRST	STET
First downs		
Plays–yards		
Rushes–yards		
Passing yards		
Passing: comp–att–int		
Turnovers		
Time of possession		

Team	Category	Player	Statistics
Marist	Passing		
Marist	Rushing		
Marist	Receiving		
Stetson	Passing		
Stetson	Rushing		
Stetson	Receiving		

=== at St. Thomas (MN) ===
Stetson Hatters (1–4) at St. Thomas Tommies (4–2) – Game summary

Quarter	1	2	3	4	Total
Hatters	0	0	0	0	0
Tommies	0	0	0	0	0

at O'Shaughnessy Stadium • St. Thomas, Minnesota

- Date: October 10
- Game time: 2:00 p.m. EDT

Game information

First quarter
Second quarter
Third quarter
Fourth quarter

Statistics	STET	STMN
First downs		
Plays–yards		
Rushes–yards		
Passing yards		
Passing: comp–att–int		
Turnovers		
Time of possession		

Team	Category	Player	Statistics
Stetson	Passing		
Stetson	Rushing		
Stetson	Receiving		
St. Thomas (MN)	Passing		
St. Thomas (MN)	Rushing		
St. Thomas (MN)	Receiving		

=== Presbyterian ===
Presbyterian Blue Hose (3–3) at Stetson Hatters (1–5) – Game summary

Quarter	1	2	3	4	Total
Blue Hose	0	0	0	0	0
Hatters	0	0	0	0	0

at Spec Martin Stadium • DeLand, Florida

- Date: October 17
- Game time: 2:00 p.m.

Game information

First quarter
Second quarter
Third quarter
Fourth quarter

Statistics	PRES	STET
First downs		
Plays–yards		
Rushes–yards		
Passing yards		
Passing: comp–att–int		
Turnovers		
Time of possession		

Team	Category	Player	Statistics
Presbyterian	Passing		
Presbyterian	Rushing		
Presbyterian	Receiving		
Stetson	Passing		
Stetson	Rushing		
Stetson	Receiving		

=== at Morehead State ===
Stetson Hatters (1–6) at Morehead State Eagles (1–6) – Game summary

Quarter	1	2	3	4	Total
Bulldogs	7	14	3	7	31
Eagles	14	0	10	14	38

at Phil Simms Stadium • Morehead, Kentucky

- Date: October 24
- Game time: 2:00 p.m.
- Game attendance: 7,317
- TV: ESPN+

Game information

First quarter
Second quarter
Third quarter
Fourth quarter

Statistics	STET	MORE
First downs		
Plays–yards		
Rushes–yards		
Passing yards		
Passing: comp–att–int		
Turnovers		
Time of possession		

Team	Category	Player	Statistics
Stetson	Passing		
Stetson	Rushing		
Stetson	Receiving		
Morehead State	Passing		
Morehead State	Rushing		
Morehead State	Receiving		

=== Dayton ===
Dayton Flyers (6–1) at Stetson Hatters (1–7) – Game summary

Quarter	1	2	3	4	Total
Flyers	0	0	0	0	0
Hatters	0	0	0	0	0

at Spec Martin Stadium • DeLand, Florida

- Date: October 31
- Game time: 1:00 p.m.

Game information

First quarter
Second quarter
Third quarter
Fourth quarter

Statistics	DAY	STET
First downs		
Plays–yards		
Rushes–yards		
Passing yards		
Passing: comp–att–int		
Turnovers		
Time of possession		

Team	Category	Player	Statistics
Dayton	Passing		
Dayton	Rushing		
Dayton	Receiving		
Stetson	Passing		
Stetson	Rushing		
Stetson	Receiving		

=== at Davidson ===
Stetson Hatters (1–8) at Davidson Wildcats (3–6) – Game summary

Quarter	1	2	3	4	Total
Hatters	0	0	0	0	0
Wildcats	0	0	0	0	0

at Davidson College Stadium • Davidson, North Carolina

- Date: November 7
- Game time: 1:00 p.m.

Game information

First quarter
Second quarter
Third quarter
Fourth quarter

Statistics	STET	DAV
First downs		
Plays–yards		
Rushes–yards		
Passing yards		
Passing: comp–att–int		
Turnovers		
Time of possession		

Team	Category	Player	Statistics
Stetson	Passing		
Stetson	Rushing		
Stetson	Receiving		
Davidson	Passing		
Davidson	Rushing		
Davidson	Receiving		

=== Valparaiso ===
Valparaiso Beacons (4–5) at Stetson Hatters (1–9) – Game summary

Quarter	1	2	3	4	Total
Beacons	0	0	0	0	0
Hatters	0	0	0	0	0

at Spec Martin Stadium • DeLand, Florida

- Date: November 14
- Game time: 1:00 p.m. EST

Game information

First quarter
Second quarter
Third quarter
Fourth quarter

Statistics	VAL	STET
First downs		
Plays–yards		
Rushes–yards		
Passing yards		
Passing: comp–att–int		
Turnovers		
Time of possession		

Team	Category	Player	Statistics
Valparaiso	Passing		
Valparaiso	Rushing		
Valparaiso	Receiving		
Stetson	Passing		
Stetson	Rushing		
Stetson	Receiving		

=== at San Diego ===
Stetson Hatters (1–10) at San Diego Toreros (5–5) – Game summary

Quarter	1	2	3	4	Total
Hatters	0	0	0	0	0
Toreros	0	0	0	0	0

at Torero Stadium • San Diego, California

- Date: November 21
- Game time: 8:00 p.m. EST

Game information

First quarter
Second quarter
Third quarter
Fourth quarter

Statistics	STET	USD
First downs		
Plays–yards		
Rushes–yards		
Passing yards		
Passing: comp–att–int		
Turnovers		
Time of possession		

Team	Category	Player	Statistics
Stetson	Passing		
Stetson	Rushing		
Stetson	Receiving		
San Diego	Passing		
San Diego	Rushing		
San Diego	Receiving		
