= Valparaiso Beacons football =

US football team and program

2026 Valparaiso Beacons football team
- First season: 1919; 107 years ago
- Athletic director: Laurel Hosmer
- Head coach: Andy Waddle; 2nd season, 2–10 (.167)
- Location: Valparaiso, Indiana
- Stadium: Brown Field (capacity: 5,000)
- NCAA division: Division I FCS
- Conference: Pioneer Football League
- Colors: Brown and gold
- All-time record: 407–552–27 (.426)
- Bowl record: 0–1 (.000)

Conference championships
- IIC: 1945, 1951, 1952, 1954, 1964, 1968, 1969 PFL: 2000, 2003

Division championships
- PFL North: 2003
- Rivalries: Butler (rivalry)
- Mascot: Beacons
- Website: ValpoAthletics.com

The Valparaiso Beacons football program is the intercollegiate American football team for Valparaiso University located in the U.S. state of Indiana. The team competes in the NCAA Division I Football Championship Subdivision (FCS) as a member of the Pioneer Football League (PFL). Valparaiso's first football team was fielded in 1919. The team plays its home games at the 5,000-seat Brown Field in Valparaiso, Indiana. Andy Waddle has served as the team's head coach since 2025. Valparaiso was known as the Crusaders until the 2019 season.

== History ==
=== Classifications ===
- 1941–1972: NCAA College Division
- 1973–1978: NCAA Division III
- 1979–1992: NCAA Division II
- 1993–present: NCAA Division I–AA/FCS

=== Conference memberships ===
- 1919–1923: Independent
- 1924–1925: Western Interstate Conference
- 1926–1933: Independent
- 1934–1947: Indiana Intercollegiate Conference
- 1948–1950: Independent
- 1951–1977: Indiana Collegiate Conference
- 1978–1989: Heartland Collegiate Conference
- 1990–1992: Midwest Intercollegiate Football Conference
- 1993–present: Pioneer Football League

== Year-by-year results ==
Head coach George Keogan:
1919	5–3
1920	5–3
Head coach Earl Goheen:
1921	2–2–1
1922	3–2–2
Head coach William Shadoan:
1923	5–2–1
1924	4–3–2
Head coach Millard Anderson:
1925	1–6
Head coach Conrad Moll:
1926	1–4–1
Head coach Earl Scott:
1927	1–5
1928	1–6
Head coach J.M. Christianson:
1929	1–7
1930	5–4
1931	8–1
1932	7–0
1933	7–1
1934	6–2
1935	4–4–1
1936	1–6–1
1937	4–4
1938	2–4–1
1939	2–6
1940	3–3–1
Head coach Victor Dauer:
1941	0–7–1
Head coach Loren Ellis:
1942	4–4
1943	No Football due to WWII
1944	No Football due to WWII
1945	6–1
Head coach Emery Bauer:
1946	1–7
1947	2–5–1
1948	4–5
1949	7–2–1
1950	9–1
1951	9–0
1952	5–3–1
1953	5–2–1
1954	6–2–1
1955	6–3
1956	6–4
(Walt Reiner joins as a Co-Head Coach):
1957	4–2–2
1958	6–3
1959	5–4
1960	3–6
1961	7–2
1962	6–3
1963	3–6
1964	6–3
(Walt Reiner leaves program as Emery Bauer returns full responsibilities):
1965	3–6
1966	3–6
1967	3–6

Head coach Norm Amundsen:
1968	4–5
1969	7–2
1970	5–3–2
1971	8–2
1972	6–4
1973	6–5
1974	3–6
1975	3–6
1976	2–7–1
Head coach Bill Koch:
1977	3–6–1
1978	5–4
1979	5–4
1980	4–5–1
1981	1–9
1982	3–7
1983	4–6
1984	6–4
1985	6–4
1986	3–7
1987	3–6
1988	0–9–1
Head coach Tom Horne:
1989	0–10
1990	1–9
1991	1–8–1
1992	3–8
1993	5–5
1994	7–3
1995	5–5
1996	4–6
1997	3–8
1998	5–6
1999	9–2
2000	7–4
2001	3–8
2002	1–10
2003	8–4
2004	5–6
Head coach Stacey Adams:
2005	3–8
2006	3–8
2007	5–6
2008	3–8
2009	1–10
Head coach Dale Carlson:
2010	0–11
2011	1–10
2012	1–10
2013	1–10
Head coach Dave Cecchini:
2014	4–8
2015	1–9
2016	4–7
2017	6–5
2018	2–9
Head coach Landon Fox:
2019	1–11
2020	4–2
2021	4–7
2022	5–7
2023	3–8
2024	4–7
Head coach Andy Waddle:
2025	2–10

=== Bowl game appearances ===
Season	Date	Bowl	W/L	Opponent	PF	PA	Coach	Notes
1950	January 1, 1951	Cigar Bowl	L	La Crosse State	14	47	Emery Bauer	notes
Total		1 bowl game	0–1		14	47		

== Championships ==
=== Conference championships ===
Year	Conference	Coach	Overall Record	Conference Record
1945	Indiana Intercollegiate Conference	Loren Ellis	6–1	4–0
1951	Indiana Intercollegiate Conference	Emory Bauer	9–0	4–0
1952†	Indiana Intercollegiate Conference	Emory Bauer	5–3–1	3–1–1
1954	Indiana Intercollegiate Conference	Emory Bauer	6–2–1	5–1
1964†	Indiana Intercollegiate Conference	Emory Bauer	6–3	4–2
1968	Indiana Intercollegiate Conference	Norm Amundsen	4–5	4–0
1969†	Indiana Intercollegiate Conference	Norm Amundsen	7–2	3–1
2000†	Pioneer Football League	Tom Horne	7–4	3–1
2003	Pioneer Football League	Tom Horne	8–4	3–1
Total conference championships				9

† Co-champions

=== Divisional championships ===
From 2001 to 2005, the Pioneer Football League (PFL) was divided into North and South Divisions. As winners of the PFL's North Division, Valparaiso has made one appearance in the Pioneer Football League Championship Game, in 2003. Valparaiso shared the Division title with San Diego in 2003, but the tie-breaker allowed the Crusaders to represent the division in the championship game.

Year	Division championship	Opponent	CG result
2003†	PFL North	Morehead State	W 54–42

† Co-champions

== Future non-conference opponents ==
Announced schedules as of July 20, 2026.

2026	2027	2028
Lawrence Tech	at North Dakota	at Youngstown State
at Murray State	at Illinois State	at Northern Iowa
at Indiana State		
