= Andy Waddle =

American football coach (born 1978 or 1979)

Current position
- Title: Head coach
- Team: Valparaiso
- Conference: PFL
- Record: 3–10

Biographical details
- Born: 1978 or 1979 (age 46–47)

Playing career
- 1997–1999: Findlay
- 2000–2002: Wittenberg
- Position: Defensive back

Coaching career (HC unless noted)
- 2003: Mansfield (DB)
- 2004: Maryville (TN) (DB)
- 2005: Wittenberg (DB)
- 2006–2012: Wittenberg (DC/DB)
- 2013–2024: Marietta
- 2025–present: Valparaiso

Head coaching record
- Overall: 57–71
- Bowls: 0–1

Accomplishments and honors

Awards
- OAC Coach of the Year (2017, 2023)

Andy Waddle (born 1978 or 1979) is an American college football coach and former player. He is the head football coach for Valparaiso University, a position he has held since 2025. He was the head football coach for Marietta College from 2013 to 2024. He also coached for Mansfield, Maryville (TN), and Wittenberg. He played college football for Findlay and Wittenberg as a defensive back.

== Early life ==
Waddle is from Enon, Ohio, and attended Greenon High School there. He graduated from Greenon in 1997. He then played college football for the Findlay Oilers before later transferring to the Wittenberg Tigers. He was a redshirt on the 1997 Findlay team that won the National Association of Intercollegiate Athletics (NAIA) national championship, then was a starting defensive back in 1998.

Waddle played his first season with Wittenberg in 2000, and in his first game, he blocked three punts, one shy of the national record at any level and tied for the NCAA Division III record. He ended up playing three seasons at Wittenberg, being named All-North Coast Athletic Conference (NCAC) and helping the team reach the NCAA playoffs each year while winning the NCAC championship twice. He graduated from Wittenberg in 2003 with a Bachelor of Arts degree and later earned a master's degree from Liberty University in 2014.

== Coaching career ==
Waddle began his coaching career in 2003, being the defensive backs coach for the Mansfield Mountaineers. He then served as the defensive secondary coach for the Maryville Scots in 2004. In 2005, he returned to Wittenberg as defensive backs coach. He was promoted to defensive coordinator in 2006 and served in the position through 2012, helping the team lead the NCAC in total defense from 2008 to 2010 while being the best in the NCAA Division III in total defense and scoring defense in 2009. Waddle helped the Tigers win two NCAC championships while sharing two additional NCAC titles in his eight-year stint there.

In December 2012, Waddle was announced as the new head coach for the Marietta Pioneers. Marietta had lost all 10 of its games the prior season and had not previously won more than three games in a season since 2006. Waddle ended up coaching the team for 12 seasons and led a major turnaround. They won one game in 2013, two in 2014 and 2015, three in 2016, and then went 6–4 in 2017 which was the program's first winning season since 2006. For the 2017 season, Waddle was named the Ohio Athletic Conference (OAC) Coach of the Year. In 2018, Marietta started off with a record of 6–0, for the first time since 1920, eventually finishing with a record of 7–3, the school's best since 1996. He led the team to an 8–2 record in 2023, just the third time Marietta had ever won that many games in a season, and won the OAC Coach of the Year award for a second time. The Pioneers had a 13-game win streak from 2023 to 2024, which included an 8–0 start and a national ranking in 2024 for the first time ever. They reached the postseason in 2024 for the first time since 1973. Waddle finished his tenure at Marietta with an overall record of 55–61, which included seven winning records in his last eight seasons.

In December 2024, Waddle was announced as the new head coach for the Valparaiso Beacons. He went 2–10 in the 2025 season.

== Personal life ==
Waddle is married and has two children.

== Head coaching record ==
| Year | Team | Overall | Conference | Standing | Bowl/playoffs |
|---|---|---|---|---|---|
Marietta Pioneers (Ohio Athletic Conference) (2013–2024)
| 2013 | Marietta | 1–9 | 1–8 | 9th | |
| 2014 | Marietta | 2–8 | 1–8 | 9th | |
| 2015 | Marietta | 2–8 | 2–7 | 8th | |
| 2016 | Marietta | 3–7 | 3–6 | T–7th | |
| 2017 | Marietta | 6–4 | 5–4 | T–5th | |
| 2018 | Marietta | 7–3 | 6–3 | 4th | |
| 2019 | Marietta | 5–5 | 4–5 | 6th | |
| 2020–21 | Marietta | 3–2 | 3–2 | 5th | |
| 2021 | Marietta | 4–6 | 4–5 | T–5th | |
| 2022 | Marietta | 6–4 | 5–4 | 5th | |
| 2023 | Marietta | 8–2 | 7–2 | 3rd | |
| 2024 | Marietta | 8–3 | 7–2 | 3rd | L Extra Points |
| Marietta: | | 55–61 | 48–56 | | |
Valparaiso Beacons (Pioneer Football League) (2025–present)
| 2025 | Valparaiso | 2–10 | 1–7 | T-10th | |
| 2026 | Valparaiso | 1–0 | 0–0 | | |
| Valparaiso: | | 3–10 | 1–7 | | |
| Total: | | 58–71 | | | |
