= Jason Woodman =

American football coach (born c. 1979)

Current position
- Title: Head coach
- Team: Morehead State
- Conference: PFL
- Record: 14–14

Biographical details
- Born: c. 1979 (age 46–47); Farmington, West Virginia, U.S.
- Education: Fairmont State University (2002); Louisiana State University

Coaching career (HC unless noted)
- 1999–2003: North Marion HS (WV) (QB/WR/DB)
- 2004–2006: LSU (GA)
- 2007: Florida State (GA)
- 2008: California (PA) (RB)
- 2009–2010: Concord (ST/WR)
- 2011–2012: Bowie State (OC)
- 2013–2023: Fairmont State
- 2024–present: Morehead State

Head coaching record
- Overall: 74–61
- Tournaments: 0–1 (NCAA D-II playoffs)

Jason Woodman (born c. 1979) is an American college football coach. He is the head football coach for Morehead State University; a position he has held since 2024. He was the head football coach for Fairmont State University from 2013 to 2023. He previously coached for North Marion High School, LSU, Florida State, California (PA), Concord, and Bowie State.

== Head coaching record ==
Year	Team	Overall	Conference	Standing	Bowl/playoffs	AFCA^{#}
Fairmont State Fighting Falcons (Mountain East Conference) (2013–2023)
2013	Fairmont State	3–7	2–7	T–9th		
2014	Fairmont State	3–7	3–7	8th		
2015	Fairmont State	6–4	6–4	T–3rd		
2016	Fairmont State	10–2	9–1	2nd	L NCAA Division II First Round	23
2017	Fairmont State	8–3	8–2	T–2nd		
2018	Fairmont State	9–2	8–2	2nd		
2019	Fairmont State	5–5	5–5	7th		
2020–21	No team—COVID-19					
2021	Fairmont State	5–6	5–5	T–6th		
2022	Fairmont State	3–8	3–7	T–9th		
2023	Fairmont State	8–3	6–3	T–2nd		
Fairmont State:		60–47	55–43			
Morehead State Eagles (Pioneer Football League) (2024–present)
2024	Morehead State	7–5	5–3	T–3rd		
2025	Morehead State	6–6	4–4	T-5th		
2026	Morehead State	1–3	0–0			
Morehead State:		14–14	9–7			
Total:		74–61				
