= Brown Field (Valparaiso University) =

Stadium at Valparaiso University, Indiana, US

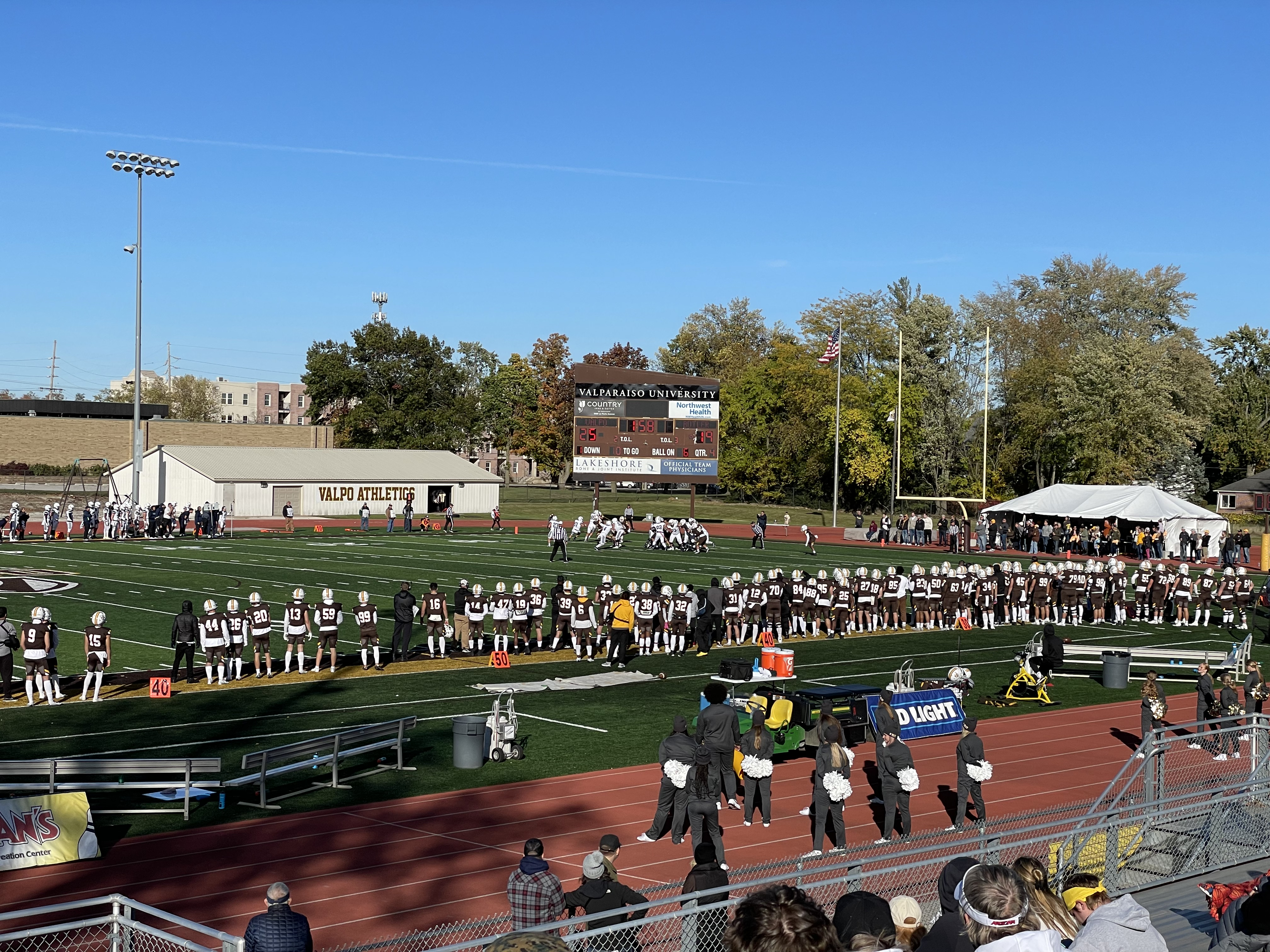
- Interactive map of Brown Field
- Location: Valparaiso University, Valparaiso, IN 46383
- Coordinates: 41°27′56″N 87°2′53″W
- Owner: Valparaiso University
- Operator: Valparaiso University
- Capacity: 5,000
- Surface: FieldTurf

Construction
- Opened: 1919

Tenant
- Valparaiso Beacons football (NCAA) (1919–present)

Brown Field is a 5,000-seat multi-purpose stadium in Valparaiso, Indiana. It is home to the Valparaiso University football and women's soccer teams. It also hosts track meets. It previously hosted the men's soccer and baseball teams. The facility opened in 1919. It has hosted 9 Conference Championship Teams (1945, 1951, 1952, 1954, 1964, 1968, 1969, 2000 and 2003).

== See also ==
- List of NCAA Division I FCS football stadiums
