= Phil Simms Stadium =

Stadium in Kentucky, USA

Coordinates: 38.191924°N 83.425338°W

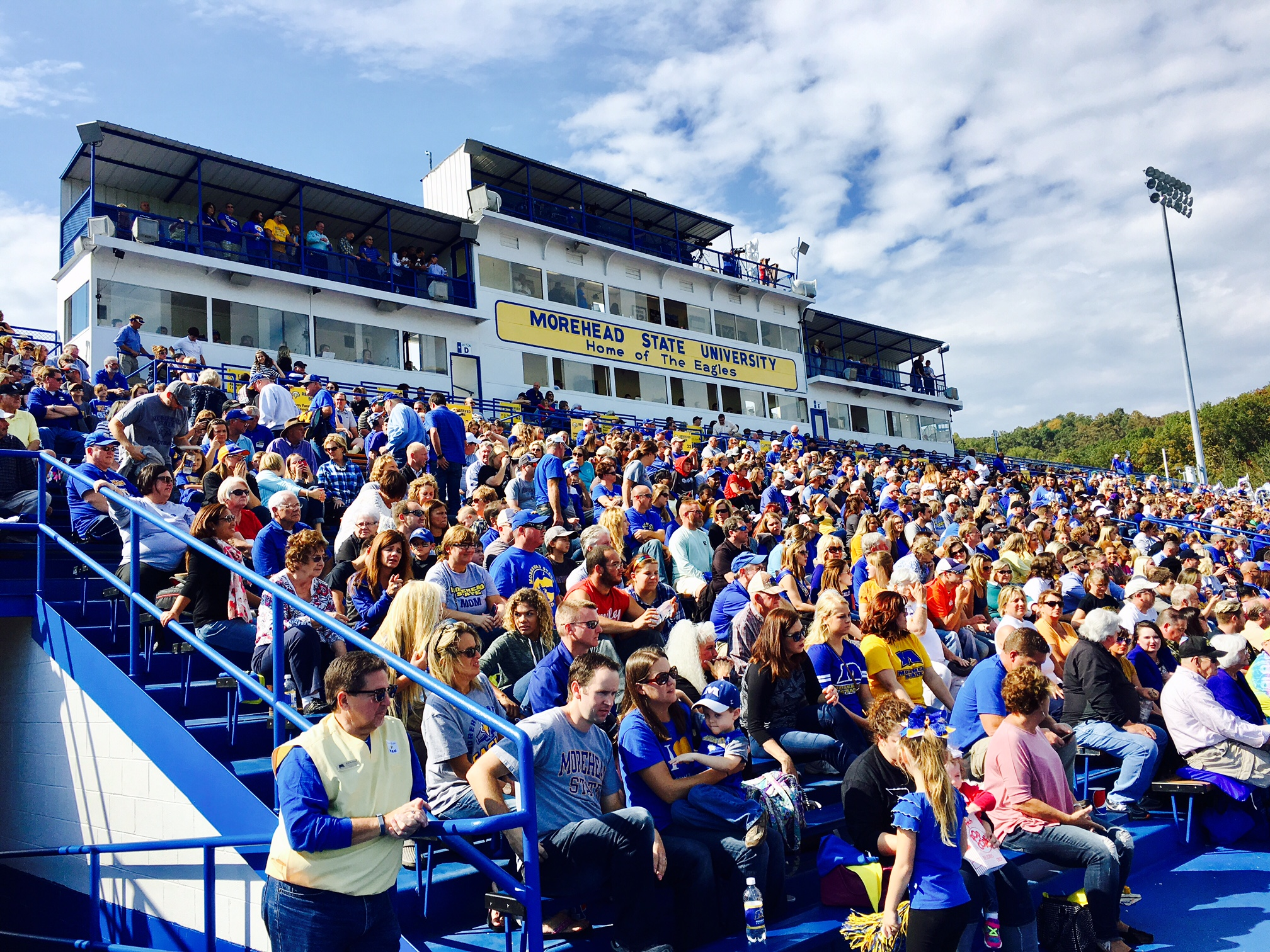
- Interactive map of Phil Simms Stadium
- Former names: Jayne Stadium (1964–2025)
- Location: 150 University Boulevard; Morehead, KY 40351
- Owner: Morehead State University
- Operator: Morehead State University
- Capacity: 10,000
- Surface: Astroturf GameDay Grass

Construction
- Opened: 1964

Tenant
- Morehead State Eagles (NCAA) (1964–present)

Phil Simms Stadium, formerly Jayne Stadium, is a 10,000-seat multi-purpose stadium in Morehead, Kentucky, United States. It opened in 1964 and is home to the Morehead State University Eagles football team. Surrounding Terry & Susan Jacobs Field, the stadium hosts press and VIP facilities, box seats and home and visiting stands. The stadium, opened in 1964, also has locker room facilities, MSU's primary sports medicine facilities and the football offices.

The football offices have been remodeled and upgraded, and the football locker room on the north end of the facility was recently renovated and now features hardwood lockers for all players and an upgraded equipment room/storage area.

Atop the stadium, the press box can accommodate 20 working media/game day staff, and there are booths for home and visiting radio and coaches. The president's box on the second level can accommodate 50 of his guests on game day. The third floor features an open-air film deck.

== Renaming ==
On June 23, 2025, the university announced that the stadium would be renamed for Phil Simms, a former NFL quarterback who went on to win two Super Bowls with the New York Giants and later had a long career as an NFL broadcast analyst for CBS Sports, ESPN, and NBC Sports. The renaming ceremony took place during MSU's homecoming festivities on October 18, 2025. The original name, honoring late Morehead State professor William LeGrande Jayne, is now memorialized by a plaque at the main stadium entrance.

== Gallery ==
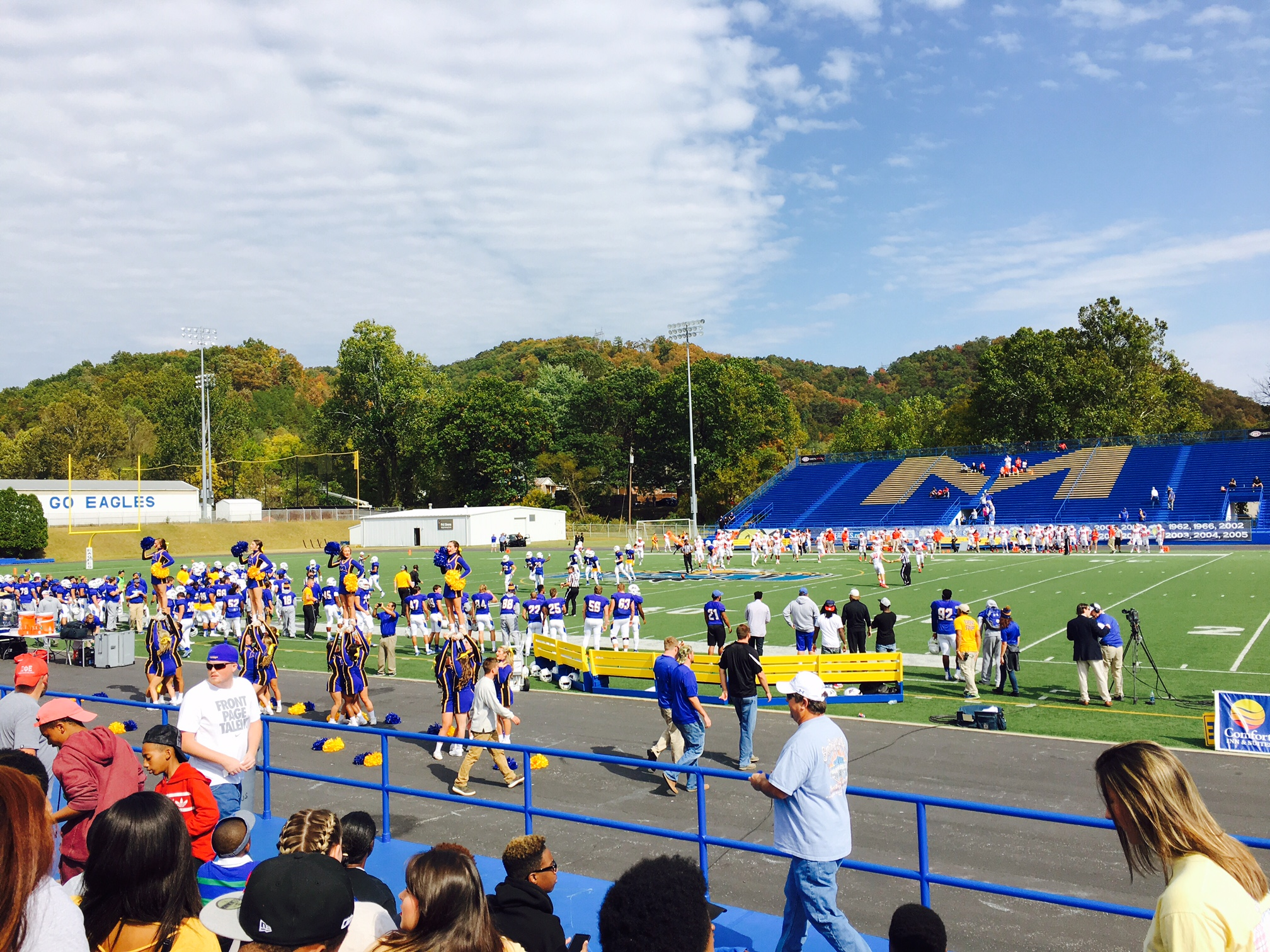
Visitors section

== See also ==
- List of NCAA Division I FCS football stadiums
