= 2022 Stetson Hatters football team =

American college football season

2022 Stetson Hatters football
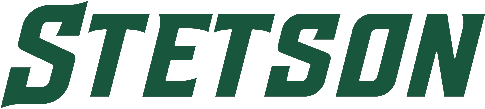
- Conference: Pioneer Football League
- Record: 4–6 (2–5 PFL)
- Head coach: Brian Young (2nd season)
- Offensive coordinator: Brian Sheppard (1st season)
- Defensive coordinator: Jonathan Johnson (1st season)
- Home stadium: Spec Martin Stadium

2022 Pioneer Football League standings
	Conf.			Overall
Team	W		L	W		L
St. Thomas (MN) * $	8	–	0	10	–	1
Dayton	6	–	2	8	–	3
Davidson ^	6	–	2	8	–	4
Butler	5	–	3	7	–	4
San Diego	4	–	3	5	–	5
Valparaiso	4	–	4	5	–	7
Marist	4	–	4	4	–	7
Drake	3	–	5	3	–	8
Stetson	2	–	5	4	–	6
Morehead State	1	–	7	2	–	9
Presbyterian	0	–	8	1	–	10
$ – Conference champion; ^ – FCS playoff participant; * – St. Thomas (MN) ineligible for FCS postseason play due to transition from NCAA Division III; Rankings from STATS Poll

The 2022 Stetson Hatters football team represented Stetson University as a member of the Pioneer Football League (PFL) during the 2022 NCAA Division I FCS football season. Led by second-year head coach Brian Young, the Hatters compiled an overall record of 4–6 with a mark of 2–5 in conference play, placing ninth in the PFL. Stetson played home games at Spec Martin Stadium in DeLand, Florida.

== Schedule ==
Date	Time	Opponent	Site	TV	Result	Attendance
September 3	6:00 p.m.	Concordia (MI)*	Spec Martin Stadium; DeLand, FL	ESPN+	W 24–14	1,715
September 10	6:00 p.m.	Louisiana Christian*	Spec Martin Stadium; DeLand, FL	ESPN+	W 45–14	782
September 17	1:00 p.m.	Princeton*	Spec Martin Stadium; DeLand, FL	ESPN+	L 14–39	1,692
September 24	1:00 p.m.	Morehead State	Spec Martin Stadium; DeLand, FL	ESPN+	W 38–26	932
October 8	1:00 p.m.	Marist	Spec Martin Stadium; DeLand, FL	ESPN+	L 31–45	1,015
October 22	1:00 p.m.	at Dayton	Welcome Stadium; Dayton, OH	Facebook Live	L 20–23	2,587
October 29	1:00 p.m.	Drake^{†}	Spec Martin Stadium; DeLand, FL	ESPN+	L 17–24	2,022
November 5	1:00 p.m.	at Davidson	Richardson Stadium; Davidson, NC		L 48–56 ^{2OT}	4,294
November 12	2:00 p.m.	at St. Thomas (MN)	O'Shaughnessy Stadium; Saint Paul, MN		L 0–23	4,625
November 19	1:00 p.m.	Presbyterian	Spec Martin Stadium; DeLand, FL	ESPN+	W 42–21	1,600
*Non-conference game; ^{†}Homecoming; All times are in Eastern time

- Stetson had a game schedule against San Diego, slated for October 1. The game was later canceled days before the game due to Hurricane Ian.

== Game summaries ==
=== Concordia (MI) ===
	1	2	3	4	Total
Cardinals	7	0	0	7	14
Hatters	3	14	7	0	24

=== Louisiana Christian ===
	1	2	3	4	Total
Wildcats	0	14	0	0	14
Hatters	14	0	14	17	45

=== Princeton ===
	1	2	3	4	Total
Tigers	7	15	10	7	39
Hatters	7	7	0	0	14

=== Morehead State ===
	1	2	3	4	Total
Eagles	6	14	0	6	26
Hatters	7	21	3	7	38

=== Marist ===
	1	2	3	4	Total
Red Foxes	7	10	7	21	45
Hatters	7	7	3	14	31

=== At Dayton ===
	1	2	3	4	Total
Hatters	0	10	10	0	20
Flyers	0	10	3	10	23

=== Drake ===
	1	2	3	4	Total
Drake Bulldogs	7	3	6	8	24
Hatters	10	0	0	7	17

=== At Davidson ===
	1	2	3	4	OT	2OT	Total
Hatters	7	13	14	7	7	0	48
Wildcats	10	7	14	10	7	8	56

=== At St. Thomas (MN) ===
	1	2	3	4	Total
Hatters	0	0	0	0	0
Tommies	7	10	6	0	23

=== Presbyterian ===
	1	2	3	4	Total
Blue Hose	0	7	7	7	21
Hatters	7	7	14	14	42
