= List of Minnesota Intercollegiate Athletic Conference football standings (1920–1955) =

This is a list of yearly Minnesota Intercollegiate Athletic Conference football standings.

== Minnesota Intercollegiate Athletic Conference football standings ==
1920 Minnesota Intercollegiate Athletic Conference football standings
	Conf.					Overall
Team	W		L		T	W		L		T
Carleton	3	–	1	–	0	4	–	1	–	2
Hamline $	2	–	1	–	1	4	–	3	–	1
Macalester	2	–	1	–	1	3	–	2	–	2
St. Olaf	3	–	2	–	0	5	–	2	–	0
St. Thomas (MN)	1	–	3	–	0	2	–	5	–	1
Gustavus Adolphus	0	–	3	–	0	1	–	3	–	0
$ – Conference champion

1921 Minnesota Intercollegiate Athletic Conference football standings
	Conf.					Overall
Team	W		L		T	W		L		T
Hamline $	5	–	0	–	0	7	–	0	–	0
Carleton	3	–	1	–	0	6	–	1	–	0
St. Olaf	3	–	2	–	0	4	–	2	–	0
St. Thomas (MN)	2	–	2	–	0	4	–	2	–	0
Macalester	2	–	2	–	0	2	–	2	–	1
Concordia (MN)	0	–	2	–	0	2	–	3	–	1
Saint John's (MN)	0	–	2	–	0	1	–	4	–	0
Gustavus Adolphus	0	–	4	–	0	2	–	4	–	0
$ – Conference champion

1922 Minnesota Intercollegiate Athletic Conference football standings
	Conf.					Overall
Team	W		L		T	W		L		T
St. Olaf +	4	–	0	–	1	5	–	0	–	1
St. Thomas (MN) +	4	–	0	–	0	8	–	1	–	0
Hamline	3	–	1	–	0	4	–	2	–	1
Carleton	2	–	2	–	0	6	–	1	–	0
Macalester	2	–	3	–	1	2	–	3	–	1
Concordia (MN)	0	–	1	–	0	1	–	4	–	0
Saint John's (MN)	0	–	4	–	0	1	–	5	–	0
Gustavus Adolphus	0	–	4	–	0	0	–	4	–	1
+ – Conference co-champions

1923 Minnesota Intercollegiate Athletic Conference football standings
	Conf.					Overall
Team	W		L		T	W		L		T
St. Olaf $	4	–	1	–	0	6	–	1	–	1
Carleton	3	–	1	–	0	5	–	2	–	0
Hamline	3	–	1	–	0	4	–	3	–	0
St. Thomas (MN)	1	–	0	–	0	5	–	0	–	0
Macalester	2	–	3	–	0	3	–	3	–	1
Concordia (MN)	1	–	3	–	0	2	–	3	–	1
Saint John's (MN)	1	–	3	–	0	2	–	3	–	0
Gustavus Adolphus	1	–	4	–	0	2	–	5	–	0
$ – Conference champion

1924 Minnesota Intercollegiate Athletic Conference football standings
	Conf.					Overall
Team	W		L		T	W		L		T
Carleton $	4	–	0	–	0	5	–	2	–	0
St. Thomas (MN)	3	–	0	–	0	5	–	2	–	0
St. Olaf	3	–	2	–	0	4	–	2	–	1
Gustavus Adolphus	2	–	2	–	1	2	–	4	–	1
Concordia (MN)	1	–	2	–	0	2	–	3	–	1
Macalester	1	–	2	–	2	1	–	3	–	2
Hamline	1	–	3	–	0	1	–	5	–	0
Saint John's (MN)	0	–	4	–	1	1	–	4	–	1
$ – Conference champion

1925 Minnesota Intercollegiate Athletic Conference football standings
	Conf.					Overall
Team	W		L		T	W		L		T
Macalester $	4	–	0	–	0	4	–	2	–	1
Gustavus Adolphus	3	–	1	–	0	5	–	1	–	0
St. Olaf	3	–	2	–	0	4	–	5	–	0
Concordia (MN)	1	–	2	–	0	2	–	2	–	1
Hamline	1	–	2	–	0	2	–	6	–	0
Saint John's (MN)	0	–	5	–	0	0	–	6	–	0
$ – Conference champion

1926 Minnesota Intercollegiate Athletic Conference football standings
	Conf.					Overall
Team	W		L		T	W		L		T
Gustavus Adolphus $	6	–	0	–	0	7	–	0	–	0
Macalester	3	–	1	–	0	5	–	3	–	0
Hamline	3	–	2	–	0	4	–	4	–	0
St. Olaf	2	–	3	–	0	2	–	5	–	0
Saint John's (MN)	1	–	3	–	1	2	–	4	–	1
Augsburg	1	–	3	–	1	1	–	3	–	1
Concordia (MN)	0	–	4	–	0	0	–	7	–	0
$ – Conference champion

1927 Minnesota Intercollegiate Athletic Conference football standings
	Conf.					Overall
Team	W		L		T	W		L		T
Gustavus Adolphus $	5	–	0	–	0	7	–	1	–	0
Augsburg	3	–	2	–	0	4	–	2	–	0
Macalester	3	–	2	–	0	3	–	4	–	0
Concordia (MN)	2	–	2	–	0	4	–	2	–	0
Hamline	1	–	2	–	1	2	–	4	–	1
St. Olaf	1	–	3	–	0	2	–	5	–	0
Saint John's (MN)	0	–	4	–	1	2	–	4	–	1
$ – Conference champion

1928 Minnesota Intercollegiate Athletic Conference football standings
	Conf.					Overall
Team	W		L		T	W		L		T
Saint Mary's (MN) +	3	–	1	–	0	5	–	2	–	0
Augsburg +	3	–	1	–	2	4	–	1	–	2
Concordia (MN)	2	–	1	–	2	3	–	1	–	2
Hamline	3	–	2	–	1	4	–	3	–	1
Gustavus Adolphus	4	–	3	–	0	4	–	3	–	0
Saint John's (MN)	1	–	2	–	1	3	–	2	–	1
Macalester	2	–	4	–	0	3	–	4	–	0
St. Thomas (MN)	1	–	3	–	1	2	–	5	–	1
St. Olaf	1	–	3	–	1	1	–	5	–	1
+ – Conference co-champions

1930 Minnesota Intercollegiate Athletic Conference football standings
	Conf.					Overall
Team	W		L		T	W		L		T
St. Olaf +	5	–	0	–	0	8	–	0	–	0
St. Thomas (MN) +	4	–	0	–	0	6	–	2	–	0
Gustavus Adolphus	3	–	2	–	0	6	–	2	–	0
Macalester	3	–	2	–	0	5	–	2	–	0
Concordia (MN)	2	–	2	–	0	4	–	3	–	1
Saint John's (MN)	0	–	3	–	1	1	–	4	–	1
Augsburg	0	–	4	–	0	1	–	4	–	1
Hamline	0	–	4	–	1	0	–	6	–	1
+ – Conference co-champions

1931 Minnesota Intercollegiate Athletic Conference football standings
	Conf.					Overall
Team	W		L		T	W		L		T
Concordia (MN) $	4	–	1	–	0	5	–	2	–	1
St. Olaf	3	–	1	–	0	6	–	2	–	0
St. Thomas (MN)	3	–	1	–	0	4	–	3	–	1
Saint John's (MN)	3	–	2	–	0	4	–	2	–	1
Macalester	2	–	2	–	1	4	–	2	–	1
Gustavus Adolphus	2	–	3	–	0	2	–	5	–	0
Hamline	1	–	3	–	1	2	–	5	–	1
Augsburg	0	–	5	–	0	0	–	5	–	0
$ – Conference champion

1933 Minnesota Intercollegiate Athletic Conference football standings
	Conf.					Overall
Team	W		L		T	W		L		T
Saint John's (MN) $	4	–	0	–	1	6	–	0	–	1
Gustavus Adolphus	3	–	1	–	1	3	–	1	–	1
St. Thomas (MN)	3	–	1	–	0	5	–	2	–	1
Concordia (MN)	1	–	1	–	3	2	–	2	–	3
St. Olaf	2	–	2	–	0	2	–	5	–	0
Hamline	2	–	3	–	0	3	–	3	–	0
Macalester	1	–	3	–	1	1	–	4	–	1
Augsburg	0	–	5	–	0	0	–	5	–	0
$ – Conference champion

1933 Minnesota Intercollegiate Athletic Conference football standings
	Conf.					Overall
Team	W		L		T	W		L		T
Gustavus Adolphus $	4	–	0	–	1	5	–	0	–	2
St. Thomas (MN)	4	–	1	–	0	5	–	2	–	2
St. Olaf	3	–	1	–	0	4	–	3	–	0
Saint Mary's (MN)	2	–	2	–	1	3	–	3	–	1
Concordia (MN)	2	–	2	–	1	2	–	3	–	3
Hamline	2	–	2	–	1	2	–	3	–	1
Saint John's (MN)	1	–	2	–	2	3	–	3	–	2
Macalester	1	–	4	–	0	1	–	5	–	0
Augsburg	0	–	5	–	0	0	–	5	–	0
$ – Conference champion

1934 Minnesota Intercollegiate Athletic Conference football standings
	Conf.					Overall
Team	W		L		T	W		L		T
Concordia (MN) $	4	–	0	–	0	7	–	1	–	1
St. Thomas (MN)	4	–	1	–	0	6	–	2	–	1
Hamline	3	–	1	–	0	3	–	2	–	0
Saint John's (MN)	2	–	1	–	1	5	–	1	–	1
St. Olaf	2	–	1	–	1	3	–	2	–	2
Saint Mary's (MN)	2	–	2	–	1	4	–	3	–	2
Macalester	1	–	3	–	1	1	–	5	–	1
Gustavus Adolphus	0	–	4	–	0	0	–	4	–	1
Augsburg	0	–	5	–	0	0	–	5	–	0
$ – Conference champion

1935 Minnesota Intercollegiate Athletic Conference football standings
	Conf.					Overall
Team	W		L		T	W		L		T
Saint John's (MN) +	3	–	0	–	1	5	–	0	–	1
Gustavus Adolphus +	3	–	0	–	1	5	–	0	–	2
St. Olaf +	3	–	0	–	0	3	–	4	–	0
St. Thomas (MN)	3	–	1	–	2	4	–	2	–	2
Hamline	2	–	2	–	0	2	–	3	–	0
Macalester	0	–	3	–	1	1	–	5	–	1
Concordia (MN)	0	–	3	–	1	1	–	6	–	1
Saint Mary's (MN)	0	–	5	–	0	2	–	6	–	0
+ – Conference co-champions

1936 Minnesota Intercollegiate Athletic Conference football standings
	Conf.					Overall
Team	W		L		T	W		L		T
Gustavus Adolphus +	5	–	0	–	0	5	–	1	–	0
Saint John's (MN) +	4	–	0	–	0	5	–	2	–	0
Concordia (MN)	3	–	2	–	0	3	–	5	–	0
St. Olaf	2	–	2	–	0	3	–	3	–	1
Hamline	1	–	3	–	0	1	–	6	–	0
Saint Mary's (MN)	1	–	3	–	0	1	–	8	–	0
Macalester	1	–	4	–	0	1	–	6	–	0
St. Thomas (MN)	1	–	4	–	0	1	–	7	–	0
+ – Conference co-champions

1937 Minnesota Intercollegiate Athletic Conference football standings
	Conf.					Overall
Team	W		L		T	W		L		T
Gustavus Adolphus $	5	–	0	–	0	6	–	0	–	0
Concordia (MN)	3	–	1	–	0	3	–	3	–	0
Saint John's (MN)	2	–	2	–	0	5	–	3	–	0
St. Thomas (MN)	1	–	1	–	2	2	–	3	–	2
Hamline	1	–	2	–	1	3	–	2	–	2
Saint Mary's (MN)	1	–	2	–	1	1	–	4	–	2
Macalester	1	–	4	–	0	1	–	5	–	1
St. Olaf	0	–	2	–	2	1	–	4	–	2
$ – Conference champion

1938 Minnesota Intercollegiate Athletic Conference football standings
	Conf.					Overall
Team	W		L		T	W		L		T
Saint John's (MN) $	5	–	0	–	0	6	–	2	–	0
Gustavus Adolphus	4	–	1	–	0	5	–	1	–	0
St. Thomas (MN)	4	–	1	–	0	6	–	2	–	0
St. Olaf	3	–	2	–	0	5	–	2	–	0
Hamline	2	–	3	–	0	2	–	4	–	0
Macalester	2	–	3	–	0	4	–	3	–	0
Concordia (MN)	0	–	5	–	0	2	–	6	–	1
Saint Mary's (MN)	0	–	5	–	0	0	–	7	–	0
$ – Conference champion

1939 Minnesota Intercollegiate Athletic Conference football standings
	Conf.					Overall
Team	W		L		T	W		L		T
St. Thomas (MN) $	4	–	0	–	1	6	–	1	–	1
Saint Mary's (MN)	4	–	1	–	0	5	–	2	–	0
Macalester	2	–	1	–	3	4	–	1	–	3
Gustavus Adolphus	3	–	2	–	0	6	–	2	–	0
Saint John's (MN)	3	–	2	–	0	5	–	2	–	0
St. Olaf	1	–	3	–	1	2	–	4	–	1
Concordia (MN)	0	–	3	–	2	2	–	4	–	2
Hamline	0	–	5	–	1	1	–	5	–	1
$ – Conference champion

1940 Minnesota Intercollegiate Athletic Conference football standings
	Conf.					Overall
Team	W		L		T	W		L		T
Gustavus Adolphus $	5	–	0	–	0	7	–	1	–	0
St. Thomas (MN)	4	–	1	–	0	5	–	3	–	0
Macalester	4	–	1	–	1	5	–	1	–	1
Saint Mary's (MN)	4	–	2	–	0	5	–	3	–	0
Saint John's (MN)	2	–	3	–	1	4	–	3	–	1
Concordia (MN)	2	–	3	–	0	4	–	4	–	1
Hamline	2	–	4	–	0	2	–	4	–	0
Augsburg	0	–	4	–	0	1	–	5	–	0
St. Olaf	0	–	5	–	0	0	–	7	–	0
$ – Conference champion

1941 Minnesota Intercollegiate Athletic Conference football standings
	Conf.					Overall
Team	W		L		T	W		L		T
St. Thomas (MN) $	5	–	0	–	0	7	–	1	–	0
Macalester	4	–	2	–	0	5	–	3	–	0
Concordia (MN)	3	–	2	–	0	5	–	2	–	0
Saint Mary's (MN)	3	–	2	–	0	4	–	3	–	0
Hamline	2	–	3	–	0	4	–	3	–	0
St. Olaf	2	–	3	–	0	2	–	4	–	1
Saint John's (MN)	1	–	3	–	0	3	–	4	–	0
Augsburg	0	–	5	–	0	1	–	6	–	0
$ – Conference champion

1942 Minnesota Intercollegiate Athletic Conference football standings
	Conf.					Overall
Team	W		L		T	W		L		T
St. Thomas (MN) +	5	–	0	–	0	8	–	0	–	0
Concordia (MN) +	3	–	0	–	1	6	–	0	–	1
Saint John's (MN)	4	–	1	–	1	4	–	1	–	1
Hamline	3	–	2	–	0	3	–	2	–	0
Gustavus Adolphus	2	–	2	–	0	4	–	4	–	0
Macalester	2	–	3	–	0	4	–	4	–	0
St. Olaf	2	–	3	–	0	2	–	4	–	1
Saint Mary's (MN)	0	–	5	–	0	1	–	7	–	0
Augsburg	0	–	5	–	0	0	–	6	–	0
+ – Conference co-champions

1945 Minnesota Intercollegiate Athletic Conference football standings
	Conf.					Overall
Team	W		L		T	W		L		T
Gustavus Adolphus $	4	–	0	–	0	6	–	0	–	0
St. Thomas (MN)	3	–	1	–	0	5	–	1	–	0
Macalester	2	–	1	–	0	3	–	1	–	0
St. Olaf	1	–	2	–	0	2	–	3	–	0
Saint John's (MN)	1	–	4	–	0	1	–	6	–	0
Concordia (MN)	0	–	1	–	0	2	–	2	–	2
Augsburg	0	–	1	–	0	0	–	3	–	0
Saint Mary's (MN)	0	–	1	–	0	0	–	5	–	0
$ – Conference champion

1946 Minnesota Intercollegiate Athletic Conference football standings
	Conf.					Overall
Team	W		L		T	W		L		T
Gustavus Adolphus $	6	–	0	–	0	7	–	0	–	1
St. Olaf	3	–	1	–	0	6	–	2	–	0
St. Thomas (MN)	3	–	1	–	0	4	–	3	–	0
Concordia (MN)	2	–	2	–	0	3	–	3	–	1
Saint John's (MN)	2	–	3	–	0	5	–	3	–	0
Saint Mary's (MN)	1	–	2	–	1	4	–	3	–	1
Augsburg	1	–	5	–	0	1	–	6	–	0
Macalester	0	–	4	–	1	1	–	6	–	1
$ – Conference champion

1947 Minnesota Intercollegiate Athletic Conference football standings
	Conf.					Overall
Team	W		L		T	W		L		T
Macalester +	4	–	0	–	0	5	–	0	–	1
St. Thomas (MN) +	4	–	0	–	0	4	–	3	–	0
Gustavus Adolphus	4	–	1	–	0	7	–	1	–	1
St. Olaf	3	–	2	–	0	5	–	3	–	0
Saint John's (MN)	3	–	2	–	0	3	–	2	–	0
Hamline	2	–	3	–	0	3	–	5	–	0
Concordia (MN)	1	–	4	–	0	3	–	4	–	0
Saint Mary's (MN)	0	–	4	–	0	1	–	6	–	0
Augsburg	0	–	5	–	0	0	–	7	–	0
+ – Conference co-champions

1948 Minnesota Intercollegiate Athletic Conference football standings
	Conf.					Overall
Team	W		L		T	W		L		T
St. Thomas (MN) $	5	–	0	–	0	7	–	1	–	1
Gustavus Adolphus	4	–	1	–	0	7	–	1	–	1
Macalester	4	–	1	–	0	6	–	2	–	0
Saint John's (MN)	3	–	2	–	0	6	–	2	–	0
Hamline	2	–	2	–	2	3	–	2	–	2
St. Olaf	2	–	2	–	1	3	–	4	–	1
Augsburg	0	–	3	–	2	1	–	3	–	2
Concordia (MN)	0	–	4	–	1	3	–	4	–	1
Saint Mary's (MN)	0	–	5	–	0	0	–	8	–	0
$ – Conference champion

1949 Minnesota Intercollegiate Athletic Conference football standings
	Conf.					Overall
Team	W		L		T	W		L		T
St. Thomas (MN) $	6	–	0	–	0	6	–	2	–	0
Gustavus Adolphus	5	–	1	–	0	8	–	1	–	0
Saint John's (MN)	4	–	2	–	0	6	–	2	–	0
Hamline	3	–	3	–	0	4	–	3	–	0
Macalester	2	–	3	–	1	3	–	4	–	1
Concordia (MN)	2	–	3	–	0	4	–	5	–	0
St. Olaf	2	–	4	–	0	5	–	4	–	0
Augsburg	1	–	3	–	1	2	–	3	–	2
Saint Mary's (MN)	0	–	6	–	0	0	–	7	–	0
$ – Conference champion

1950 Minnesota Intercollegiate Athletic Conference football standings
	Conf.					Overall
Team	W		L		T	W		L		T
Gustavus Adolphus $	6	–	0	–	0	9	–	2	–	0
St. Thomas (MN)	5	–	1	–	0	5	–	3	–	0
Hamline	4	–	2	–	0	5	–	2	–	0
Macalester	3	–	2	–	1	5	–	3	–	1
Saint John's (MN)	3	–	3	–	0	4	–	3	–	0
Minnesota–Duluth	3	–	3	–	0	4	–	3	–	0
Concordia (MN)	2	–	4	–	0	3	–	4	–	0
St. Olaf	2	–	4	–	0	2	–	6	–	0
Augsburg	1	–	5	–	0	1	–	5	–	1
Saint Mary's (MN)	0	–	5	–	1	1	–	5	–	1
$ – Conference champion

1951 Minnesota Intercollegiate Athletic Conference football standings
	Conf.					Overall
Team	W		L		T	W		L		T
Gustavus Adolphus $	6	–	0	–	0	8	–	0	–	1
Minnesota–Duluth	5	–	1	–	0	5	–	2	–	1
St. Thomas (MN)	5	–	1	–	0	6	–	2	–	0
Saint John's (MN)	4	–	1	–	0	4	–	3	–	0
St. Olaf	3	–	2	–	0	3	–	4	–	0
Hamline	3	–	3	–	0	3	–	3	–	0
Concordia (MN)	2	–	4	–	0	4	–	4	–	0
Saint Mary's (MN)	1	–	5	–	0	1	–	6	–	0
Macalester	0	–	6	–	0	2	–	7	–	0
Augsburg	0	–	6	–	0	0	–	7	–	0
$ – Conference champion

1952 Minnesota Intercollegiate Athletic Conference football standings
	Conf.					Overall
Team	W		L		T	W		L		T
Gustavus Adolphus +	6	–	0	–	0	7	–	1	–	0
Concordia (MN) +	6	–	0	–	0	7	–	2	–	0
Hamline	4	–	2	–	0	6	–	2	–	0
Saint John's (MN)	3	–	3	–	0	5	–	3	–	0
St. Thomas (MN)	3	–	3	–	0	3	–	5	–	0
Macalester	2	–	2	–	1	2	–	4	–	1
Augsburg	2	–	4	–	0	3	–	5	–	0
Saint Mary's (MN)	0	–	5	–	1	1	–	5	–	1
Minnesota–Duluth	0	–	6	–	0	0	–	7	–	1
+ – Conference co-champions

1953 Minnesota Intercollegiate Athletic Conference football standings
	Conf.					Overall
Team	W		L		T	W		L		T
Gustavus Adolphus +	5	–	1	–	0	6	–	2	–	0
Saint John's (MN) +	5	–	1	–	0	6	–	2	–	0
Concordia (MN)	4	–	2	–	0	5	–	3	–	0
Macalester	4	–	2	–	0	5	–	3	–	0
Minnesota–Duluth	3	–	3	–	0	3	–	4	–	0
Hamline	3	–	3	–	0	4	–	3	–	0
St. Thomas (MN)	2	–	4	–	0	3	–	5	–	0
Augsburg	1	–	5	–	0	2	–	6	–	0
Saint Mary's (MN)	0	–	6	–	0	0	–	7	–	0
+ – Conference co-champions

1954 Minnesota Intercollegiate Athletic Conference football standings
	Conf.					Overall
Team	W		L		T	W		L		T
Gustavus Adolphus $	6	–	0	–	0	7	–	2	–	0
Concordia (MN)	5	–	1	–	0	6	–	1	–	1
Saint John's (MN)	4	–	2	–	0	6	–	2	–	0
Minnesota–Duluth	4	–	2	–	0	5	–	3	–	0
St. Thomas (MN)	4	–	2	–	0	5	–	3	–	0
Hamline	3	–	3	–	0	4	–	3	–	0
Macalester	1	–	5	–	0	2	–	6	–	0
Augsburg	0	–	6	–	0	1	–	7	–	0
Saint Mary's (MN)	0	–	6	–	0	0	–	8	–	0
$ – Conference champion

1955 Minnesota Intercollegiate Athletic Conference football standings
	Conf.					Overall
Team	W		L		T	W		L		T
Gustavus Adolphus $	5	–	1	–	0	5	–	3	–	0
Saint John's (MN)	4	–	2	–	0	7	–	2	–	0
Concordia (MN)	4	–	2	–	0	6	–	2	–	0
Macalester	4	–	2	–	0	4	–	3	–	1
Augsburg	3	–	3	–	0	4	–	4	–	0
St. Thomas (MN)	3	–	3	–	0	4	–	4	–	0
Minnesota–Duluth	1	–	5	–	0	3	–	5	–	0
Hamline	0	–	6	–	0	0	–	7	–	0
$ – Conference champion
