= 2022 Drake Bulldogs football team =

American college football season

2022 Drake Bulldogs football
- Conference: Pioneer Football League
- Record: 3–8 (3–5 PFL)
- Head coach: Todd Stepsis (4th season)
- Defensive coordinator: Allen Smith (4th season)
- Home stadium: Drake Stadium

2022 Pioneer Football League standings
	Conf.			Overall
Team	W		L	W		L
St. Thomas (MN) * $	8	–	0	10	–	1
Dayton	6	–	2	8	–	3
Davidson ^	6	–	2	8	–	4
Butler	5	–	3	7	–	4
San Diego	4	–	3	5	–	5
Valparaiso	4	–	4	5	–	7
Marist	4	–	4	4	–	7
Drake	3	–	5	3	–	8
Stetson	2	–	5	4	–	6
Morehead State	1	–	7	2	–	9
Presbyterian	0	–	8	1	–	10
$ – Conference champion; ^ – FCS playoff participant; * – St. Thomas (MN) ineligible for FCS postseason play due to transition from NCAA Division III; Rankings from STATS Poll

The 2022 Drake Bulldogs football team represented Drake University as a member of the Pioneer Football League (PFL) during the 2022 NCAA Division I FCS football season. The Bulldogs were led by fourth-year head coach Todd Stepsis and played their home games at Drake Stadium in Des Moines, Iowa.

== Preseason ==
=== Preseason coaches' poll ===
Predicted finish	Team	Votes (1st place)
1	Davidson (8)	98
2	San Diego (3)	91
3	St. Thomas	78
4	Dayton	72
5	Morehead State	58
6	Marist	52
7	Drake	42
8	Valparaiso	34
9	Stetson	33
10	Butler	30
11	Presbyterian	17

== Schedule ==
Date	Time	Opponent	Site	TV	Result	Attendance
September 3	2:30 p.m.	at No. 1 North Dakota State*	Fargodome; Fargo, ND	ESPN+	L 14–56	15,951
September 10	1:00 p.m.	Missouri S&T*	Drake Stadium; Des Moines, IA	ESPN3	L 14–17 ^{OT}	1,827
September 17	2:00 p.m.	at Idaho*	Kibbie Dome; Moscow, ID	ESPN+	L 14–42	5,804
September 24	1:00 p.m.	Marist	Drake Stadium; Des Moines, IA	ESPN3	L 25–30	2,249
October 1	12:00 p.m.	at Dayton	Welcome Stadium; Dayton, OH (rivalry)	Facebook	L 14–27	4,600
October 8	1:00 p.m.	San Diego	Drake Stadium; Des Moines, IA	ESPN3	L 10–22	2,964
October 15	1:00 p.m.	at St. Thomas (MN)	O'Shaughnessy Stadium; Saint Paul, MN		L 14–26	6,588
October 22	1:00 p.m.	Davidson	Drake Stadium; Des Moines, IA	ESPN3	L 14–48	1,826
October 29	12:00 p.m.	at Stetson	Spec Martin Stadium; DeLand, FL	ESPN+	W 24–17	2,022
November 12	1:00 p.m.	Butler	Drake Stadium; Des Moines, IA	ESPN3	W 27–24	1,764
November 19	12:00 p.m.	at Valparaiso	Brown Field; Valparaiso, IN	ESPN+	W 24–0	419
*Non-conference game; Rankings from STATS Poll released prior to the game; All times are in Central time

== Game summaries ==
=== At No. 1 North Dakota State ===
	1	2	3	4	Total
Bulldogs	7	0	7	0	14
No. 1 Bison	14	28	7	7	56

=== Missouri S&T ===
	1	2	3	4	OT	Total
Miners	0	7	7	0	3	17
Bulldogs	0	0	7	7	0	14

=== At Idaho ===
	1	2	3	4	Total
Bulldogs	7	7	0	0	14
Vandals	7	13	14	8	42

=== Marist ===
	1	2	3	4	Total
Red Foxes	7	14	3	6	30
Bulldogs	10	0	3	12	25

=== At Dayton ===
	1	2	3	4	Total
Bulldogs	0	7	0	7	14
Flyers	7	3	14	3	27

=== San Diego ===
	1	2	3	4	Total
Toreros	7	2	6	7	22
Bulldogs	0	3	0	7	10

=== At St. Thomas (MN) ===
	1	2	3	4	Total
Bulldogs	7	7	0	0	14
Tommies	7	13	0	6	26

=== Davidson ===
	1	2	3	4	Total
Wildcats	7	14	7	20	48
Bulldogs	7	7	0	0	14

=== At Stetson ===
	1	2	3	4	Total
Bulldogs	7	3	6	8	24
Hatters	10	0	0	7	17

=== Butler ===
	1	2	3	4	Total
Butler Bulldogs	7	7	7	3	24
Drake Bulldogs	17	7	0	3	27

=== At Valparaiso ===
	1	2	3	4	Total
Bulldogs	7	10	0	7	24
Beacons	0	0	0	0	0
