= 2022 San Diego Toreros football team =

American college football season

2022 San Diego Toreros football
- Conference: Pioneer Football League
- Record: 5–5 (4–3 PFL)
- Head coach: Dale Lindsey (10th season)
- Offensive coordinator: Corey White (1st season)
- Defensive coordinator: Bobby Jay (5th season)
- Home stadium: Torero Stadium

2022 Pioneer Football League standings
	Conf.			Overall
Team	W		L	W		L
St. Thomas (MN) * $	8	–	0	10	–	1
Dayton	6	–	2	8	–	3
Davidson ^	6	–	2	8	–	4
Butler	5	–	3	7	–	4
San Diego	4	–	3	5	–	5
Valparaiso	4	–	4	5	–	7
Marist	4	–	4	4	–	7
Drake	3	–	5	3	–	8
Stetson	2	–	5	4	–	6
Morehead State	1	–	7	2	–	9
Presbyterian	0	–	8	1	–	10
$ – Conference champion; ^ – FCS playoff participant; * – St. Thomas (MN) ineligible for FCS postseason play due to transition from NCAA Division III; Rankings from STATS Poll

The 2022 San Diego Toreros football team represented the University of San Diego as a member of the Pioneer Football League (PFL) during the 2022 NCAA Division I FCS football season. Led by Dale Lindsey in his tenth and final season as head coach, the Toreros compiled an overall record of 5–5 with a mark of 4–3 conference play, placing fifth in the PFL. The team played home games at Torero Stadium in San Diego.

== Schedule ==
Date	Time	Opponent	Site	TV	Result	Attendance
September 3	6:00 p.m.	La Verne*	Torero Stadium; San Diego, CA	WCC	W 58–0	2,901
September 10	2:00 p.m.	at Cal Poly*	Alex G. Spanos Stadium; San Luis Obispo, CA	ESPN+	L 27–28	6,782
September 17	7:00 p.m.	at UC Davis*	UC Davis Health Stadium; Davis, CA	ESPN+	L 13–43	14,394
September 24	10:00 a.m.	at Valparaiso	Brown Field; Valparaiso, IN	ESPN3	L 21–28	3,485
October 8	11:00 a.m.	at Drake	Drake Stadium; Des Moines, IA	ESPN3	W 22–10	2,964
October 15	2:00 p.m.	Presbyterian	Torero Stadium; San Diego, CA	WCC	W 28–3	1,563
October 29	11:00 a.m.	at St. Thomas (MN)	O'Shaughnessy Stadium; Saint Paul, MN		L 42–49	4,849
November 5	1:00 p.m.	Butler	Torero Stadium; San Diego, CA		L 23–26	811
November 12	1:00 p.m.	Davidson	Torero Stadium; San Diego, CA		W 31–14	2,518
November 19	11:00 a.m.	at Morehead State	Jayne Stadium; Morehead, KY	ESPN3	W 14–9	2,878
*Non-conference game; All times are in Eastern time

- San Diego had a game schedule against Stetson, slated for October 1. The game was later canceled days before the game due to Hurricane Ian.

== Game summaries ==
=== La Verne ===
	1	2	3	4	Total
Leopards	0	0	0	0	0
Toreros	7	20	17	14	58

=== At Cal Poly ===
	1	2	3	4	Total
Toreros	7	10	7	3	27
Mustangs	0	7	7	14	28

=== At UC Davis ===
	1	2	3	4	Total
Toreros	0	7	6	0	13
Aggies	14	21	8	0	43

=== At Valparaiso ===
	1	2	3	4	Total
Toreros	7	7	0	7	21
Beacons	0	13	7	8	28

=== At Drake ===
	1	2	3	4	Total
Toreros	7	2	6	7	22
Drake Bulldogs	0	3	0	7	10

=== Presbyterian ===
	1	2	3	4	Total
Blue Hose	0	0	3	0	3
Toreros	7	7	7	7	28

=== At St. Thomas (MN) ===
	1	2	3	4	Total
Toreros	7	14	14	7	42
Tommies	7	14	14	14	49

=== Butler ===
	1	2	3	4	Total
Butler Bulldogs	3	10	0	13	26
Toreros	14	6	0	3	23

=== Davidson ===
	1	2	3	4	Total
Wildcats	7	0	0	7	14
Toreros	14	10	7	0	31

=== At Morehead State ===
	1	2	3	4	Total
Toreros	7	7	0	0	14
Eagles	0	0	9	0	9
