= 2022 Marist Red Foxes football team =

American college football season

2022 Marist Red Foxes football
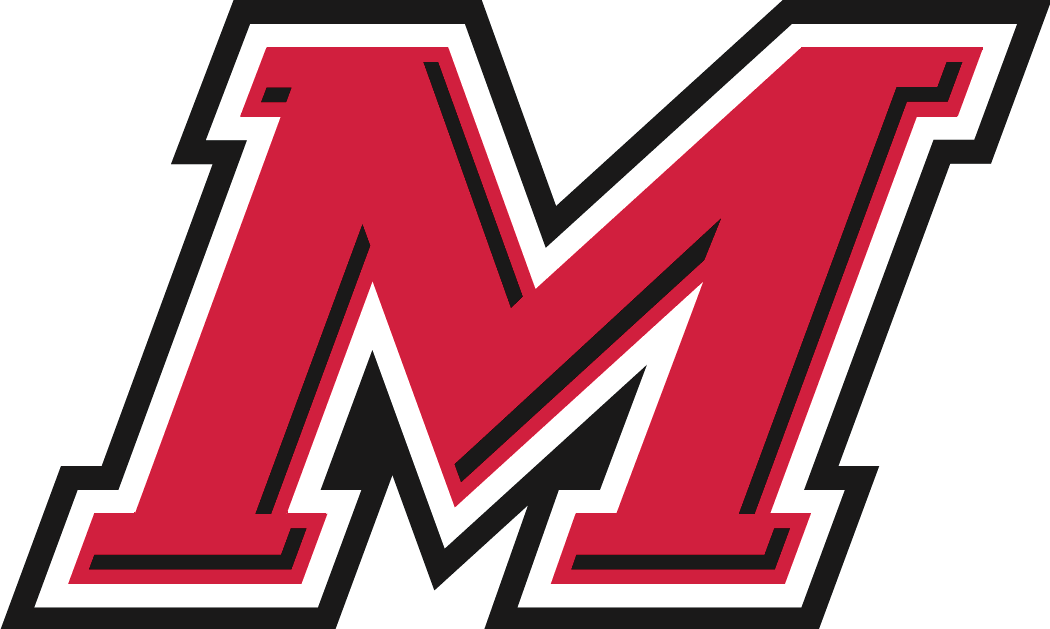
- Conference: Pioneer Football League
- Record: 4–7 (4–4 PFL)
- Head coach: Jim Parady (30th season)
- Offensive coordinator: Jake Dembow (3rd season)
- Defensive coordinator: Scott Rumsey (23rd season)
- Home stadium: Tenney Stadium at Leonidoff Field

2022 Pioneer Football League standings
	Conf.			Overall
Team	W		L	W		L
St. Thomas (MN) * $	8	–	0	10	–	1
Dayton	6	–	2	8	–	3
Davidson ^	6	–	2	8	–	4
Butler	5	–	3	7	–	4
San Diego	4	–	3	5	–	5
Valparaiso	4	–	4	5	–	7
Marist	4	–	4	4	–	7
Drake	3	–	5	3	–	8
Stetson	2	–	5	4	–	6
Morehead State	1	–	7	2	–	9
Presbyterian	0	–	8	1	–	10
$ – Conference champion; ^ – FCS playoff participant; * – St. Thomas (MN) ineligible for FCS postseason play due to transition from NCAA Division III; Rankings from STATS Poll

The 2022 Marist Red Foxes football team represented Marist College as a member of the Pioneer Football League (PFL) during the 2022 NCAA Division I FCS football season. Led by 30th-year head coach Jim Parady, the Red Foxes compiled an overall record of 4–7 with a mark of 4–4 in conference play, tying for sixth place in the PFL. Marist played home games at Tenney Stadium at Leonidoff Field in Poughkeepsie, New York.

== Schedule ==
Date	Time	Opponent	Site	TV	Result	Attendance
September 3	12:00 p.m.	Georgetown*	Tenney Stadium at Leonidoff Field; Poughkeepsie, NY	ESPN3	L 12–43	2,453
September 17	6:00 p.m.	Columbia*	Tenney Stadium at Leonidoff Field; Poughkeepsie, NY	ESPN3	L 3–38	1,643
September 24	2:00 p.m.	at Drake	Drake Stadium; Des Moines, IA	ESPN3	W 30–25	2,249
October 1	12:00 p.m.	St. Thomas (MN)	Tenney Stadium at Leonidoff Field; Poughkeepsie, NY	ESPN3	L 24–38	4,632
October 8	1:00 p.m.	at Stetson	Spec Martin Stadium; DeLand, FL	ESPN+	W 45–31	1,015
October 15	12:00 p.m.	Dayton	Tenney Stadium at Leonidoff Field; Poughkeepsie, NY	ESPN3	L 7–24	718
October 22	1:00 p.m.	at Butler	Bud and Jackie Sellick Bowl; Indianapolis, IN	FloSports	L 10–31	4,739
October 29	12:00 p.m.	Presbyterian^{†}	Tenney Stadium at Leonidoff Field; Poughkeepsie, NY	ESPN3	W 37–7	1,923
November 5	1:00 p.m.	at Morehead State	Jayne Stadium; Morehead, KY	ESPN3	W 31–21	3,245
November 12	12:00 p.m.	Valparaiso	Tenney Stadium at Leonidoff Field; Poughkeepsie, NY	ESPN+	L 24–45	1,469
November 19	1:00 p.m.	at Bucknell*	Christy Mathewson–Memorial Stadium; Lewisburg, PA	ESPN+	L 13–24	809
*Non-conference game; ^{†}Homecoming; All times are in Eastern time

== Game summaries ==
=== Georgetown ===
	1	2	3	4	Total
Hoyas	0	20	7	16	43
Red Foxes	3	3	6	0	12

=== Columbia ===
	1	2	3	4	Total
Lions	21	10	7	0	38
Red Foxes	0	0	0	3	3

=== At Drake ===
	1	2	3	4	Total
Red Foxes	7	14	3	6	30
Drake Bulldogs	10	0	3	12	25

=== St. Thomas (MN) ===
	1	2	3	4	Total
Tommies	7	14	7	10	38
Red Foxes	3	0	14	7	24

=== At Stetson ===
	1	2	3	4	Total
Red Foxes	7	10	7	21	45
Hatters	7	7	3	14	31

=== Dayton ===
	1	2	3	4	Total
Flyers	0	7	3	14	24
Red Foxes	0	0	0	7	7

=== At Butler ===
	1	2	3	4	Total
Red Foxes	7	3	0	0	10
Bulldogs	0	10	7	14	31

=== Presbyterian ===
	1	2	3	4	Total
Blue Hose	0	0	0	7	7
Red Foxes	7	13	10	7	37

=== At Morehead State ===
	1	2	3	4	Total
Red Foxes	0	14	7	10	31
Eagles	0	14	0	7	21

=== Valparaiso ===
	1	2	3	4	Total
Beacons	7	17	7	14	45
Red Foxes	0	3	7	14	24

=== At Bucknell ===
	1	2	3	4	Total
Red Foxes	7	6	0	0	13
Bison	3	0	7	14	24
