= 2022 Valparaiso Beacons football team =

American college football season

2022 Valparaiso Beacons football
- Conference: Pioneer Football League
- Record: 5–7 (4–4 PFL)
- Head coach: Landon Fox (4th season)
- Offensive coordinator: Will Fleming (1st season)
- Defensive coordinator: Brian Dougherty (4th season)
- Home stadium: Brown Field

2022 Pioneer Football League standings
	Conf.			Overall
Team	W		L	W		L
St. Thomas (MN) * $	8	–	0	10	–	1
Dayton	6	–	2	8	–	3
Davidson ^	6	–	2	8	–	4
Butler	5	–	3	7	–	4
San Diego	4	–	3	5	–	5
Valparaiso	4	–	4	5	–	7
Marist	4	–	4	4	–	7
Drake	3	–	5	3	–	8
Stetson	2	–	5	4	–	6
Morehead State	1	–	7	2	–	9
Presbyterian	0	–	8	1	–	10
$ – Conference champion; ^ – FCS playoff participant; * – St. Thomas (MN) ineligible for FCS postseason play due to transition from NCAA Division III; Rankings from STATS Poll

The 2022 Valparaiso Beacons football team represented Valparaiso University as a member of the Pioneer Football League (PFL) during the 2022 NCAA Division I FCS football season. They were led by fourth-year head coach Landon Fox and played their home games at Brown Field in Valparaiso, Indiana.

== Schedule ==
Date	Time	Opponent	Site	TV	Result	Attendance
September 3	6:00 p.m.	Indiana Wesleyan*	Brown Field; Valparaiso, IN	ESPN3	W 20–17	3,260
September 10	6:30 p.m.	at Illinois State*	Hancock Stadium; Normal, IL	Marquee/ESPN+	L 21–28	6,937
September 17	1:30 p.m.	at Dartmouth*	Memorial Field; Hanover, NH	ESPN+	L 13–35	3,562
September 24	12:00 p.m.	San Diego^{†}	Brown Field; Valparaiso, IN	ESPN3	W 28–21	3,485
October 8	12:00 p.m.	at Presbyterian	Bailey Memorial Stadium; Clinton, SC	ESPN+	W 41–21	894
October 15	1:00 p.m.	Butler	Brown Field; Valparaiso, IN (Hoosier Helmet Trophy)	ESPN3	L 25–26	2,156
October 22	2:00 p.m.	at Morehead State	Jayne Stadium; Morehead, KY	ESPN3	W 40–35	8,055
October 29	12:00 p.m.	at Dayton	Welcome Stadium; Dayton, OH	Facebook Live	L 24–31	2,566
November 5	1:00 p.m.	St. Thomas (MN)	Brown Field; Valparaiso, IN	ESPN3	L 7–34	1,416
November 12	11:00 a.m.	at Marist	Tenney Stadium at Leonidoff Field; Poughkeepsie, NY	ESPN+	W 45–24	1,469
November 19	12:00 p.m.	Drake	Brown Field; Valparaiso, IN	ESPN+	L 0–24	419
December 3	3:00 p.m.	at New Mexico State*	Aggie Memorial Stadium; Las Cruces, NM	FloSports	L 3–65	14,784
*Non-conference game; ^{†}Homecoming; All times are in Eastern time

The December 3 game was a late addition to the schedule, as a replacement for New Mexico State's cancelled game against San Jose State (see 2022 New Mexico State Aggies football team). The NCAA had to approve a waiver to allow Valparaiso to play a 12th game.

== Game summaries ==
=== Indiana Wesleyan ===
	1	2	3	4	Total
Wildcats	3	0	7	7	17
Beacons	3	14	0	3	20

=== At Illinois State ===
	1	2	3	4	Total
Beacons	7	7	0	7	21
Redbirds	7	14	7	0	28

=== At Dartmouth ===
	1	2	3	4	Total
Beacons	3	7	3	0	13
Big Green	7	14	7	7	35

=== San Diego ===
	1	2	3	4	Total
Toreros	7	7	0	7	21
Beacons	0	13	7	8	28

=== At Presbyterian ===
	1	2	3	4	Total
Beacons	7	7	7	20	41
Blue Hose	7	14	0	0	21

=== Butler ===
	1	2	3	4	Total
Butler Bulldogs	0	0	6	20	26
Beacons	13	0	6	6	25

=== At Morehead State ===
	1	2	3	4	Total
Beacons	14	7	7	12	40
Eagles	7	14	7	7	35

=== At Dayton ===
	1	2	3	4	Total
Beacons	14	0	7	3	24
Flyers	14	3	7	7	31

=== St. Thomas (MN) ===
	1	2	3	4	Total
Tommies	7	7	13	7	34
Beacons	0	0	7	0	7

=== At Marist ===
	1	2	3	4	Total
Beacons	7	17	7	14	45
Red Foxes	0	3	7	14	24

=== Drake ===
	1	2	3	4	Total
Drake Bulldogs	7	10	0	7	24
Beacons	0	0	0	0	0

=== At New Mexico State ===
Valparaiso Beacons at New Mexico State Aggies – Game summary

Quarter	1	2	3	4	Total
Beacons	0	3	0	0	3
Aggies	21	14	17	13	65

at Aggie Memorial Stadium, Las Cruces, New Mexico

- Date: December 3
- Game time: 1:00 p.m. MST
- Game weather: Cloudy • Temperature: 66 °F (19 °C) • Wind: N 7 MPH
- Game attendance: 14,784
- TV announcers (FloSports): Adam Young, Danny Knee, and Andy Morgan
- Box score, Recap

Game information
First quarter
- NMSU – Jonathan Brady 50-yard pass from Diego Pavia (Ethan Albertson kick), 9:25. Aggies 7–0. Drive: 3 plays, 84 yards, 1:22.
- NMSU – Justice Powers 69-yard pass from Diego Pavia (Ethan Albertson kick), 4:33. Aggies 14–0. Drive: 4 plays, 81 yards, 1:45.
- NMSU – Kordell David 70-yard pass from Diego Pavia (Ethan Albertson kick), 2:44. Aggies 21–0. Drive: 1 play, 70 yards, 0:11.

Second quarter

- VAL – Brian Bartholomew 49-yard field goal, 13:59. Aggies 21–3. Drive: 10 plays, 53 yards, 3:40.
- NMSU – Bryce Childress 72-yard pass from Diego Pavia (Ethan Albertson kick), 13:02. Aggies 28–3. Drive: 2 plays, 74 yards, 0:50.
- NMSU – Diego Pavia 13-yard run (Ethan Albertson kick), 6:23. Aggies 35–3. Drive: 7 plays, 75 yards, 3:11.

Third quarter

- NMSU – Jamoni Jones 2-yard run (Ethan Albertson kick), 10:52. Aggies 42–3. Drive: 1 play, 2 yards, 0:03.
- NMSU – Star Thomas 1-yard run (Ethan Albertson kick), 6:39. Aggies 49–3. Drive: 7 plays, 60 yards, 2:46.
- NMSU – Ethan Albertson 42-yard field goal, 5:03. Aggies 52–3. Drive: 4 plays, 7 yards, 0:34.

Fourth quarter

- NMSU – Ahmonte Watkins 78-yard run (Ethan Albertson kick), 14:33. Aggies 59–3. Drive: 1 play, 78 yards, 0:00.
- NMSU – Jonathan Brady 8-yard pass from Weston Eget (run failed), 10:18. Aggies 65–3. Drive: 4 plays, 44 yards, 1:58.

Statistics

Statistics	VAL	NMSU
First downs	15	20
Total yards	188	621
Rushing yards	28	232
Passing yards	160	389
Turnovers	0	1
Time of possession	40:09	19:51

Team	Category	Player	Statistics
Valparaiso	Passing	Michael Appel Jr.	16/31, 106 yards
Valparaiso	Rushing	Aaron Dawson	13 rushes, 17 yards
Valparaiso	Receiving	Braden Contreras	4 receptions, 40 yards
New Mexico State	Passing	Diego Pavia	9/13, 323 yards, 4 TD
New Mexico State	Rushing	Ahmonte Watkins	1 rush, 78 yards, TD
New Mexico State	Receiving	Kordell David	3 receptions, 95 yards, TD
