= 2022 Butler Bulldogs football team =

American college football season

2022 Butler Bulldogs football
- Conference: Pioneer Football League
- Record: 7–4 (5–3 PFL)
- Head coach: Mike Uremovich (1st season)
- Defensive coordinator: Jeff Knowles (1st season)
- Home stadium: Bud and Jackie Sellick Bowl

2022 Pioneer Football League standings
	Conf.			Overall
Team	W		L	W		L
St. Thomas (MN) * $	8	–	0	10	–	1
Dayton	6	–	2	8	–	3
Davidson ^	6	–	2	8	–	4
Butler	5	–	3	7	–	4
San Diego	4	–	3	5	–	5
Valparaiso	4	–	4	5	–	7
Marist	4	–	4	4	–	7
Drake	3	–	5	3	–	8
Stetson	2	–	5	4	–	6
Morehead State	1	–	7	2	–	9
Presbyterian	0	–	8	1	–	10
$ – Conference champion; ^ – FCS playoff participant; * – St. Thomas (MN) ineligible for FCS postseason play due to transition from NCAA Division III; Rankings from STATS Poll

The 2022 Butler Bulldogs football team represented Butler University as a member of the Pioneer Football League (PFL) during the 2022 NCAA Division I FCS football season. Led by first-year head coach Mike Uremovich, Bulldogs compiled an overall record of 7–4 with a mark of 5–3 in conference play, placing fourth in the PFL. Butler played home games at the Bud and Jackie Sellick Bowl in Indianapolis.

== Schedule ==
Date	Time	Opponent	Site	TV	Result	Attendance
September 3	1:00 p.m.	St. Thomas (FL)*	Bud and Jackie Sellick Bowl; Indianapolis, IN	FloSports	W 31–26	2,194
September 10	6:00 p.m.	Taylor*	Bud and Jackie Sellick Bowl; Indianapolis, IN	FloSports	W 45–10	3,281
September 17	7:00 p.m.	at No. 2 South Dakota State*	Dana J. Dykhouse Stadium; Brookings, SD		L 17–45	16,414
October 1	1:00 p.m.	at Davidson	Richardson Stadium; Davidson, NC		L 0–31	2,114
October 8	1:00 p.m.	Dayton	Bud and Jackie Sellick Bowl; Indianapolis, IN	FloSports	W 31–0	2,733
October 15	2:00 p.m.	at Valparaiso	Brown Field; Valparaiso, IN (Hoosier Helmet Trophy)	ESPN3	W 26–25	2,156
October 22	1:00 p.m.	Marist^{†}	Bud and Jackie Sellick Bowl; Indianapolis, IN	FloSports	W 31–10	4,739
October 29	12:00 p.m.	Morehead State	Bud and Jackie Sellick Bowl; Indianapolis, IN	FloSports	W 56–20	2,529
November 5	4:00 p.m.	at San Diego	Torero Stadium; San Diego, CA		W 26–23	811
November 12	2:00 p.m.	at Drake	Drake Stadium; Des Moines, IA	ESPN3	L 24–27	1,764
November 19	12:00 p.m.	St. Thomas (MN)	Bud and Jackie Sellick Bowl; Indianapolis, IN	FloSports	L 13–27	2,023
*Non-conference game; ^{†}Homecoming; Rankings from STATS Poll released prior to the game; All times are in Eastern time

== Game summaries ==
=== St. Thomas (FL) ===
	1	2	3	4	Total
Bobcats	7	7	6	6	26
Bulldogs	0	3	14	14	31

=== Taylor ===
	1	2	3	4	Total
Trojans	7	0	0	3	10
Bulldogs	7	14	14	10	45

=== At No. 2 South Dakota State ===
	1	2	3	4	Total
Bulldogs	7	0	0	10	17
No. 2 Jackrabbits	14	14	3	14	45

=== At Davidson ===
	1	2	3	4	Total
Bulldogs	0	0	0	0	0
Wildcats	3	0	14	14	31

=== Dayton ===
	1	2	3	4	Total
Flyers	0	0	0	0	0
Bulldogs	3	7	14	7	31

=== At Valparaiso ===
	1	2	3	4	Total
Bulldogs	0	0	6	20	26
Beacons	13	0	6	6	25

=== Marist ===
	1	2	3	4	Total
Red Foxes	7	3	0	0	10
Bulldogs	0	10	7	14	31

=== Morehead State ===
	1	2	3	4	Total
Eagles	7	0	7	6	20
Bulldogs	21	21	14	0	56

=== At San Diego ===
	1	2	3	4	Total
Bulldogs	3	10	0	13	26
Toreros	14	6	0	3	23

=== At Drake ===
	1	2	3	4	Total
Butler Bulldogs	7	7	7	3	24
Drake Bulldogs	17	7	0	3	27

=== St. Thomas (MN) ===
	1	2	3	4	Total
Tommies	14	0	3	10	27
Bulldogs	0	0	7	6	13
