= 2022 St. Thomas Tommies football team =

American college football season

2022 St. Thomas Tommies football

PFL champion
- Conference: Pioneer Football League

Ranking
- FCS Coaches: No. 20
- Record: 10–1 (8–0 PFL)
- Head coach: Glenn Caruso (14th season)
- Offensive coordinator: Jake Landry (1st season)
- Defensive coordinator: Wallie Kuchinski (14th season)
- Home stadium: O'Shaughnessy Stadium

2022 Pioneer Football League standings
| | Conf. | | | Overall |
| Team | W | | L | W | | L |
|---|---|---|---|---|---|---|
| St. Thomas (MN) * $ | 8 | – | 0 | 10 | – | 1 |
| Dayton | 6 | – | 2 | 8 | – | 3 |
| Davidson ^ | 6 | – | 2 | 8 | – | 4 |
| Butler | 5 | – | 3 | 7 | – | 4 |
| San Diego | 4 | – | 3 | 5 | – | 5 |
| Valparaiso | 4 | – | 4 | 5 | – | 7 |
| Marist | 4 | – | 4 | 4 | – | 7 |
| Drake | 3 | – | 5 | 3 | – | 8 |
| Stetson | 2 | – | 5 | 4 | – | 6 |
| Morehead State | 1 | – | 7 | 2 | – | 9 |
| Presbyterian | 0 | – | 8 | 1 | – | 10 |
$ – Conference champion; ^ – FCS playoff participant; * – St. Thomas (MN) ineligible for FCS postseason play due to transition from NCAA Division III; Rankings from STATS Poll

The 2022 St. Thomas Tommies football team represented the University of St. Thomas in Saint Paul, Minnesota as a member of the Pioneer Football League (PFL) during the 2022 NCAA Division I FCS football season. Led by 14th-year head coach Glenn Caruso, the Tommies compiled an overall record of 10–1 with a mark of 8–0 in conference play, winning the PFL title. St. Thomas was ineligible for the NCAA Division I Football Championship playoffs due to the program's transition from NCAA Division III. Davidson received the PFL's automatic bid to the playoffs. The Tommies played home games at O'Shaughnessy Stadium in Saint Paul, Minnesota.

== Schedule ==
| Date | Time | Opponent | Site | TV | Result | Attendance |
|---|---|---|---|---|---|---|
| September 1 | 7:00 p.m. | at Southern Utah* | Eccles Coliseum; Cedar City, UT | ESPN+ | L 13–44 | 5,000 |
| September 10 | 1:00 p.m. | Michigan Tech* | O'Shaughnessy Stadium; Saint Paul, MN | | W 32–6 | 4,768 |
| September 24 | 1:00 p.m. | Lincoln (CA)* | O'Shaughnessy Stadium; Saint Paul, MN | | W 43–6 | 4,359 |
| October 1 | 11:00 a.m. | at Marist | Tenney Stadium at Leonidoff Field; Poughkeepsie, NY | ESPN3 | W 38–24 | 4,632 |
| October 8 | 1:00 p.m. | Davidson | O'Shaughnessy Stadium; Saint Paul, MN | | W 27–16 | 6,177 |
| October 15 | 1:00 p.m. | Drake^{†} | O'Shaughnessy Stadium; Saint Paul, MN | | W 26–14 | 6,588 |
| October 22 | 12:00 p.m. | at Presbyterian | Bailey Memorial Stadium; Clinton, SC | ESPN+ | W 46–17 | 1,346 |
| October 29 | 1:00 p.m. | San Diego | O'Shaughnessy Stadium; Saint Paul, MN | | W 49–42 | 4,849 |
| November 5 | 1:00 p.m. | at Valparaiso | Brown Field; Valparaiso, IN | ESPN3 | W 34–7 | 1,416 |
| November 12 | 1:00 p.m. | Stetson | O'Shaughnessy Stadium; Saint Paul, MN | | W 23–0 | 4,625 |
| November 19 | 11:00 a.m. | at Butler | Bud and Jackie Sellick Bowl; Indianapolis, IN | | W 27–13 | 2,023 |
*Non-conference game; ^{†}Homecoming; All times are in Central time

== Game summaries ==
=== At Southern Utah ===
| | 1 | 2 | 3 | 4 | Total |
|---|---|---|---|---|---|
| Tommies | 7 | 0 | 6 | 0 | 13 |
| Thunderbirds | 10 | 10 | 11 | 13 | 44 |

=== Michigan Tech ===
| | 1 | 2 | 3 | 4 | Total |
|---|---|---|---|---|---|
| Huskies | 3 | 0 | 0 | 3 | 6 |
| Tommies | 6 | 20 | 6 | 0 | 32 |

=== Lincoln (CA) ===
| | 1 | 2 | 3 | 4 | Total |
|---|---|---|---|---|---|
| Oaklanders | 3 | 0 | 3 | 0 | 6 |
| Tommies | 15 | 0 | 22 | 6 | 43 |

=== At Marist ===
| | 1 | 2 | 3 | 4 | Total |
|---|---|---|---|---|---|
| Tommies | 7 | 14 | 7 | 10 | 38 |
| Red Foxes | 3 | 0 | 14 | 7 | 24 |

=== Davidson ===
| | 1 | 2 | 3 | 4 | Total |
|---|---|---|---|---|---|
| Wildcats | 0 | 3 | 7 | 6 | 16 |
| Tommies | 7 | 14 | 6 | 0 | 27 |

=== Drake ===
| | 1 | 2 | 3 | 4 | Total |
|---|---|---|---|---|---|
| Drake Bulldogs | 7 | 7 | 0 | 0 | 14 |
| Tommies | 7 | 13 | 0 | 6 | 26 |

=== At Presbyterian ===
| | 1 | 2 | 3 | 4 | Total |
|---|---|---|---|---|---|
| Tommies | 0 | 14 | 22 | 10 | 46 |
| Blue Hose | 10 | 7 | 0 | 0 | 17 |

=== San Diego ===
| | 1 | 2 | 3 | 4 | Total |
|---|---|---|---|---|---|
| Toreros | 7 | 14 | 14 | 7 | 42 |
| Tommies | 7 | 14 | 14 | 14 | 49 |

=== At Valparaiso ===
| | 1 | 2 | 3 | 4 | Total |
|---|---|---|---|---|---|
| Tommies | 7 | 7 | 13 | 7 | 34 |
| Beacons | 0 | 0 | 7 | 0 | 7 |

=== Stetson ===
| | 1 | 2 | 3 | 4 | Total |
|---|---|---|---|---|---|
| Hatters | 0 | 0 | 0 | 0 | 0 |
| Tommies | 7 | 10 | 6 | 0 | 23 |

=== At Butler ===
| | 1 | 2 | 3 | 4 | Total |
|---|---|---|---|---|---|
| Tommies | 14 | 0 | 3 | 10 | 27 |
| Butler Bulldogs | 0 | 0 | 7 | 6 | 13 |
