= 2022 Dayton Flyers football team =

American college football season

2022 Dayton Flyers football
- Conference: Pioneer Football League
- Record: 8–3 (6–2 PFL)
- Head coach: Rick Chamberlin (14th season)
- Offensive coordinator: Josh Hendershot (1st season)
- Defensive coordinator: Tee Overman (3rd season)
- Home stadium: Welcome Stadium

2022 Pioneer Football League standings
	Conf.			Overall
Team	W		L	W		L
St. Thomas (MN) * $	8	–	0	10	–	1
Dayton	6	–	2	8	–	3
Davidson ^	6	–	2	8	–	4
Butler	5	–	3	7	–	4
San Diego	4	–	3	5	–	5
Valparaiso	4	–	4	5	–	7
Marist	4	–	4	4	–	7
Drake	3	–	5	3	–	8
Stetson	2	–	5	4	–	6
Morehead State	1	–	7	2	–	9
Presbyterian	0	–	8	1	–	10
$ – Conference champion; ^ – FCS playoff participant; * – St. Thomas (MN) ineligible for FCS postseason play due to transition from NCAA Division III; Rankings from STATS Poll

The 2022 Dayton Flyers football team represented the University of Dayton as a member of the Pioneer Football League (PFL) during the 2022 NCAA Division I FCS football season. Led by Rick Chamberlin in his 14th and final season as head coach, the Flyers compiled an overall record of 8–3 with a mark of 6–2 in conference play, tying for second place in the PFL with Davidson. The St. Thomas Tommies won the conference title, but were ineligible for the postseason because of the program's five-year transition from NCAA Division III competition to the NCAA Division I Football Championship Subdivision (FCS). Davidson, by virtue of a head-to-head win over Dayton in the final week of the regular season, earned the PFL's automatic bid to the NCAA Division I Football Championship playoffs. Dayton played their home games at Welcome Stadium in Dayton, Ohio.

== Preseason ==
=== Preseason coaches' poll ===
The Pioneer League released its preseason coaches' poll on August 1, 2022. The Flyers were picked to finish in fourth place.

== Schedule ==
Date	Time	Opponent	Site	TV	Result	Attendance
September 3	12:00 p.m.	at Robert Morris*	Joe Walton Stadium; Moon Township, PA	ESPN+	W 22–20	3,207
September 10	2:00 p.m.	at Youngstown State*	Stambaugh Stadium; Youngstown, OH	ESPN+	L 16–49	13,597
September 17	1:00 p.m.	Kentucky State*	Welcome Stadium; Dayton, OH	Facebook	W 46–3	2,682
October 1	1:00 p.m.	Drake	Welcome Stadium; Dayton, OH (rivalry)	Facebook	W 27–14	4,600
October 8	1:00 p.m.	at Butler	Bud and Jackie Sellick Bowl; Indianapolis, IN	FloSports	L 0–31	2,733
October 15	12:00 p.m.	at Marist	Tenney Stadium at Leonidoff Field; Poughkeepsie, NY	ESPN3	W 24–7	718
October 22	1:00 p.m.	Stetson	Welcome Stadium; Dayton, OH	Facebook	W 23–20	2,587
October 29	1:00 p.m.	Valparaiso	Welcome Stadium; Dayton, OH	Facebook	W 31–24	2,566
November 5	1:00 p.m.	at Presbyterian	Bailey Memorial Stadium; Clinton, SC	ESPN+	W 52–28	1,366
November 12	1:00 p.m.	Morehead State	Welcome Stadium; Dayton, OH	Facebook	W 49–27	2,549
November 19	1:00 p.m.	at Davidson	Richardson Stadium; Davidson, NC		L 23–24	4,103
*Non-conference game; All times are in Eastern time

== Game summaries ==
=== at Robert Morris ===
	1	2	3	4	Total
Flyers	3	3	16	0	22
Colonials	0	14	0	6	20

=== at Youngstown State ===
	1	2	3	4	Total
Flyers	0	10	0	6	16
Penguins	21	7	7	14	49

=== Kentucky State ===
	1	2	3	4	Total
Thorobreds	0	3	0	0	3
Flyers	7	3	22	14	46

=== Drake ===
	1	2	3	4	Total
Drake Bulldogs	0	7	0	7	14
Flyers	7	3	14	3	27

=== at Butler ===
	1	2	3	4	Total
Flyers	0	0	0	0	0
Butler Bulldogs	3	7	14	7	31

=== at Marist ===
	1	2	3	4	Total
Flyers	0	7	3	14	24
Red Foxes	0	0	0	7	7

=== Stetson ===
	1	2	3	4	Total
Hatters	0	10	10	0	20
Flyers	0	10	3	10	23

=== Valparaiso ===
	1	2	3	4	Total
Beacons	14	0	7	3	24
Flyers	14	3	7	7	31

=== at Presbyterian ===
	1	2	3	4	Total
Flyers	21	14	10	7	52
Blue Hose	7	7	7	7	28

=== Morehead State ===
	1	2	3	4	Total
Eagles	7	10	3	7	27
Flyers	12	9	7	21	49

=== at Davidson ===
	1	2	3	4	Total
Flyers	7	3	7	6	23
Wildcats	7	3	14	0	24

== Coaching staff ==
Dayton Flyers
Name	Position	Consecutive season at Dayton in current position	Previous position	UD profile
Rick Chamberlin	Head coach	14th	Dayton – Defensive coordinator (?–2007)	
Josh Hendershot	Offensive coordinator	1st	Dayton – Tight end / offensive line (2020–2021)	
Tee Overman	Defensive coordinator	3rd	Washington State – Quality control (2017–2019)	
Jake Velluci	Special teams coordinator / defensive ends	1st	Concordia (IL) – Defensive backs (2020–2021)	
Braden Layer	Quarterbacks	1st	Bowdoin – Offensive coordinator / quarterbacks (2019–2021)	
Sam Costantino	Wide receivers	1st	Eastern Illinois – Assistant wide receivers / offensive quality control (2020–2021)	
Ted Flaherty	Secondary	1st	Minnesota – Defensive intern (2021)	
Mark Ewald	Running backs	9th	Wittenberg – Running backs (2006–2014)	
Andy Aracri	Defensive tackles	4th	Fairmont HS (OH) – Head coach (2012–2017)	
Scott Horcher	Cornerbacks	4th	Springboro HS (OH) – Co-defensive coordinator (2016–2018)	
Jay Minton	Tight ends	4th	Wayne HS (OH) – Head coach (1999–2018)	
