= 2022 Davidson Wildcats football team =

American college football season

2022 Davidson Wildcats football

NCAA Division I First Round, L 0–41 at Richmond
- Conference: Pioneer Football League
- Record: 8–4 (6–2 PFL)
- Head coach: Scott Abell (5th season)
- Defensive coordinator: Jon Berlin (5th season)
- Home stadium: Richardson Stadium

2022 Pioneer Football League standings
	Conf.			Overall
Team	W		L	W		L
St. Thomas (MN) * $	8	–	0	10	–	1
Dayton	6	–	2	8	–	3
Davidson ^	6	–	2	8	–	4
Butler	5	–	3	7	–	4
San Diego	4	–	3	5	–	5
Valparaiso	4	–	4	5	–	7
Marist	4	–	4	4	–	7
Drake	3	–	5	3	–	8
Stetson	2	–	5	4	–	6
Morehead State	1	–	7	2	–	9
Presbyterian	0	–	8	1	–	10
$ – Conference champion; ^ – FCS playoff participant; * – St. Thomas (MN) ineligible for FCS postseason play due to transition from NCAA Division III; Rankings from STATS Poll

The 2022 Davidson Wildcats football team represented Davidson College as a member of the Pioneer Football League (PFL) during the 2022 NCAA Division I FCS football season. They were led by fifth-year head coach Scott Abell and played their home games at Richardson Stadium. Although the Wildcats finished in a second place tie in the conference with a 6–2 conference record, they claimed the PFL's automatic bid in the FCS Playoffs (due to St. Thomas (MN) being ineligible due to their 5-year transition from Division III to Division I) after narrowly defeating Dayton 24–23 in the final week of the regular season.

== Schedule ==
Date	Time	Opponent	Site	TV	Result	Attendance
September 3	2:00 p.m.	at Jacksonville State*	Burgess–Snow Field at JSU Stadium; Jacksonville, AL	ESPN+	L 17–35	18,462
September 10	7:00 p.m.	Barton*	Richardson Stadium; Davidson, NC		W 37–17	3,971
September 17	7:00 p.m.	St. Andrews*	Richardson Stadium; Davidson, NC		W 56–6	4,317
September 24	7:00 p.m.	at Presbyterian	Bailey Memorial Stadium; Clinton, SC	ESPN+	W 56–24	1,626
October 1	1:00 p.m.	Butler	Richardson Stadium; Davidson, NC		W 31–0	2,114
October 8	2:00 p.m.	at St. Thomas (MN)	O'Shaughnessy Stadium; Saint Paul, MN		L 16–27	6,177
October 15	1:00 p.m.	Morehead State	Richardson Stadium; Davidson, NC		W 28–26	3,822
October 22	2:00 p.m.	at Drake	Drake Stadium; Des Moines, IA	ESPN3	W 48–14	1,826
November 5	1:00 p.m.	Stetson	Richardson Stadium; Davidson, NC		W 56–48 ^{2OT}	4,294
November 12	4:00 p.m.	at San Diego	Torero Stadium; San Diego, CA	WCC	L 14–31	2,518
November 19	1:00 p.m.	Dayton	Richardson Stadium; Davidson, NC		W 24–23	4,103
November 26	2:00 p.m.	at No. 13 Richmond*	E. Claiborne Robins Stadium; Richmond, VA (NCAA Division I First Round)	ESPN+	L 0–41	3,000
*Non-conference game; Rankings from STATS Poll released prior to the game; All times are in Eastern time

== Game summaries ==
=== At Jacksonville State ===
	1	2	3	4	Total
Wildcats	7	3	7	0	17
Gamecocks	7	21	0	7	35

=== Barton ===
	1	2	3	4	Total
Barton Bulldogs	7	7	3	0	17
Wildcats	14	13	0	10	37

=== St. Andrews ===
	1	2	3	4	Total
Knights	0	6	0	0	6
Wildcats	28	14	14	0	56

=== At Presbyterian ===
	1	2	3	4	Total
Wildcats	14	21	0	21	56
Blue Hose	3	7	7	7	24

=== Butler ===
	1	2	3	4	Total
Butler Bulldogs	0	0	0	0	0
Wildcats	3	0	14	14	31

=== At St. Thomas (MN) ===
	1	2	3	4	Total
Wildcats	0	3	7	6	16
Tommies	7	14	6	0	27

=== Morehead State ===
	1	2	3	4	Total
Eagles	7	10	3	6	26
Wildcats	7	21	0	0	28

=== At Drake ===
	1	2	3	4	Total
Wildcats	7	14	7	20	48
Drake Bulldogs	7	7	0	0	14

=== Stetson ===
	1	2	3	4	OT	2OT	Total
Hatters	7	13	14	7	7	0	48
Wildcats	10	7	14	10	7	8	56

=== At San Diego ===
	1	2	3	4	Total
Wildcats	7	0	0	7	14
Toreros	14	10	7	0	31

=== Dayton ===
	1	2	3	4	Total
Flyers	7	3	7	6	23
Wildcats	7	3	14	0	24

=== At Richmond ===
	1	2	3	4	Total
Wildcats	0	0	0	0	0
Spiders	10	17	7	7	41
