= DuWayne =

DuWayne may refer to:

- DuWayne Bridges (born 1946), American politician
- Duwayne Brooks (born 1974), English politician
- DuWayne Deitz (1930–2018), American football player and coach
- Duwayne Dunham (born 1952), American film director
- Duwayne Ewart (born 1998), Canadian soccer player
- DuWayne Johnsrud (born 1943), American politician
- Duwayne Kerr (born 1987), Jamaican footballer
- Dial D. Ryder (Dial Duwayne Ryder; 1938–2011), American gunsmith
