= Rick Chamberlin =

American football player and coach (born 1957)

Biographical details
- Born: April 2, 1957 (age 69); Springfield, Ohio, U.S.

Playing career
- 1975–1978: Dayton
- Position: Linebacker

Coaching career (HC unless noted)
- 1980–?: Dayton (LB)
- ?–2007: Dayton (DC/LB)
- 2008–2022: Dayton

Head coaching record
- Overall: 107–48
- Tournaments: 0–1 (NCAA D-I playoffs)

Accomplishments and honors

Championships
- 3 PFL (2009–2010, 2015)

Rick Chamberlin (born April 2, 1957) is an American college football coach and former player. He is the former head football coach at University of Dayton, a position he held from January 2008 until his retirement in November 2022.

== Head coaching record ==
Year	Team	Overall	Conference	Standing	Bowl/playoffs
Dayton Flyers (Pioneer Football League) (2008–2022)
2008	Dayton	9–3	6–2	T–2nd	
2009	Dayton	9–2	7–1	T–1st	
2010	Dayton	10–1	8–0	T–1st	
2011	Dayton	6–5	4–4	5th	
2012	Dayton	6–5	5–3	T–4th	
2013	Dayton	7–4	5–3	T–4th	
2014	Dayton	8–3	6–2	T–3rd	
2015	Dayton	10–2	7–1	T–1st	L NCAA Division I First Round
2016	Dayton	9–2	7–1	2nd	
2017	Dayton	5–6	4–4	T–6th	
2018	Dayton	6–5	5–3	T–4th	
2019	Dayton	8–3	6–2	T–2nd	
2020–21	No team—COVID-19				
2021	Dayton	6–4	5–3	T–5th	
2022	Dayton	8–3	6–2	T–2nd	
Dayton:		107–48	81–31		
Total:		107–48			
