= 2022 Morehead State Eagles football team =

American college football season

2022 Morehead State Eagles football
- Conference: Pioneer Football League
- Record: 2–9 (1–7 PFL)
- Head coach: Rob Tenyer (10th season)
- Defensive coordinator: Andrew Strobel (2nd season)
- Home stadium: Jayne Stadium

2022 Pioneer Football League standings
	Conf.			Overall
Team	W		L	W		L
St. Thomas (MN) * $	8	–	0	10	–	1
Dayton	6	–	2	8	–	3
Davidson ^	6	–	2	8	–	4
Butler	5	–	3	7	–	4
San Diego	4	–	3	5	–	5
Valparaiso	4	–	4	5	–	7
Marist	4	–	4	4	–	7
Drake	3	–	5	3	–	8
Stetson	2	–	5	4	–	6
Morehead State	1	–	7	2	–	9
Presbyterian	0	–	8	1	–	10
$ – Conference champion; ^ – FCS playoff participant; * – St. Thomas (MN) ineligible for FCS postseason play due to transition from NCAA Division III; Rankings from STATS Poll

The 2022 Morehead State Eagles football team represented Morehead State University as a member of the Pioneer Football League (PFL) during the 2022 NCAA Division I FCS football season. The Eagles were led by tenth-year head coach Rob Tenyer and played their home games at Jayne Stadium.

== Schedule ==
Date	Time	Opponent	Site	TV	Result	Attendance
August 27	7:00 p.m.	at No. 23 Mercer*	Five Star Stadium; Macon, GA	ESPN+	L 13–63	9,027
September 10	3:00 p.m.	at No. 4 Montana State*	Bobcat Stadium; Bozeman, MT	ESPN+	L 13–63	19,927
September 17	6:00 p.m.	Kentucky Christian*	Jayne Stadium; Morehead, KY	ESPN+	W 49–14	7,643
September 24	1:00 p.m.	at Stetson	Spec Martin Stadium; DeLand, FL	ESPN3	L 26–38	932
October 1	1:00 p.m.	Presbyterian	Jayne Stadium; Morehead, KY	ESPN3	W 14–10	2,885
October 15	1:00 p.m.	at Davidson	Richardson Stadium; Davidson, NC		L 26–28	3,822
October 22	3:00 p.m.	Valparaiso^{†}	Jayne Stadium; Morehead, KY	ESPN+	L 35–40	8,055
October 29	12:00 p.m.	at Butler	Bud and Jackie Sellick Bowl; Indianapolis, IN		L 20–56	2,529
November 5	1:00 p.m.	Marist	Jayne Stadium; Morehead, KY	ESPN3	L 21–31	3,245
November 12	1:00 p.m.	at Dayton	Welcome Stadium; Dayton, OH	Facebook	L 27–49	
November 19	1:00 p.m.	San Diego	Jayne Stadium; Morehead, KY	ESPN3	L 9–14	2,878
*Non-conference game; ^{†}Homecoming; Rankings from STATS Poll released prior to the game; All times are in Eastern time

== Game summaries ==
=== At No. 23 Mercer ===
	1	2	3	4	Total
Eagles	0	10	3	0	13
No. 23 Bears	14	28	14	7	63

=== At No. 4 Montana State ===
	1	2	3	4	Total
Eagles	0	3	3	7	13
No. 4 Bobcats	28	7	14	14	63

=== Kentucky Christian ===
	1	2	3	4	Total
Knights	7	7	0	0	14
Eagles	28	0	7	14	49

=== At Stetson ===
	1	2	3	4	Total
Eagles	6	14	0	6	26
Hatters	7	21	3	7	38

=== Presbyterian ===
	1	2	3	4	Total
Blue Hose	0	0	0	10	10
Eagles	7	7	0	0	14

=== At Davidson ===
	1	2	3	4	Total
Eagles	7	10	3	6	26
Wildcats	7	21	0	0	28

=== Valparaiso ===
	1	2	3	4	Total
Beacons	14	7	7	12	40
Eagles	7	7	14	7	35

=== At Butler ===
	1	2	3	4	Total
Eagles	7	0	7	6	20
Butler Bulldogs	21	21	14	0	56

=== Marist ===
	1	2	3	4	Total
Red Foxes	0	14	7	10	31
Eagles	0	14	0	7	21

=== At Dayton ===
	1	2	3	4	Total
Eagles	7	10	3	7	27
Flyers	12	9	7	21	49

=== San Diego ===
	1	2	3	4	Total
Toreros	7	7	0	0	14
Eagles	0	0	9	0	9
