= 2022 Presbyterian Blue Hose football team =

American college football season

2022 Presbyterian Blue Hose football
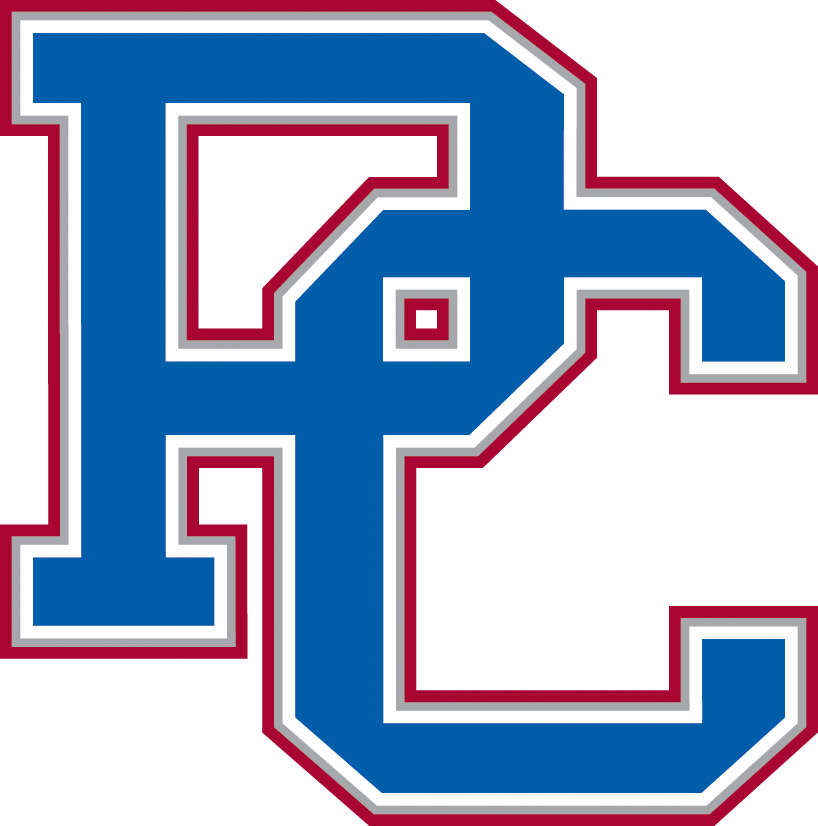
- Conference: Pioneer Football League
- Record: 1–10 (0–8 PFL)
- Head coach: Steve Englehart (1st season)
- Defensive coordinator: Daniel Owen (1st season)
- Home stadium: Bailey Memorial Stadium

2022 Pioneer Football League standings
	Conf.			Overall
Team	W		L	W		L
St. Thomas (MN) * $	8	–	0	10	–	1
Dayton	6	–	2	8	–	3
Davidson ^	6	–	2	8	–	4
Butler	5	–	3	7	–	4
San Diego	4	–	3	5	–	5
Valparaiso	4	–	4	5	–	7
Marist	4	–	4	4	–	7
Drake	3	–	5	3	–	8
Stetson	2	–	5	4	–	6
Morehead State	1	–	7	2	–	9
Presbyterian	0	–	8	1	–	10
$ – Conference champion; ^ – FCS playoff participant; * – St. Thomas (MN) ineligible for FCS postseason play due to transition from NCAA Division III; Rankings from STATS Poll

The 2022 Presbyterian Blue Hose football team represented Presbyterian College as a member of the Pioneer Football League (PFL) during the 2022 NCAA Division I FCS football season. Led by first-year head coach Steve Englehart, the Blue Hose played home games at Bailey Memorial Stadium in Clinton, South Carolina.

== Schedule ==
Date	Time	Opponent	Site	TV	Result	Attendance
September 3	2:00 p.m.	at Austin Peay*	Fortera Stadium; Clarksville, TN	ESPN+	L 0–63	4,211
September 10	1:00 p.m.	Virginia–Lynchburg*	Bailey Memorial Stadium; Clinton, SC	ESPN+	W 21–13	932
September 17	3:30 p.m.	at Western Carolina*	Bob Waters Field at E. J. Whitmire Stadium; Cullowhee, NC	ESPN+	L 21–77	11,776
September 24	7:00 p.m.	Davidson	Bailey Memorial Stadium; Clinton, SC	ESPN+	L 24–56	1,626
October 1	1:00 p.m.	at Morehead State	Jayne Stadium; Morehead, KY	ESPN+	L 10–14	2,885
October 8	1:00 p.m.	Valparaiso	Bailey Memorial Stadium; Clinton, SC	ESPN+	L 21–41	894
October 15	5:00 p.m.	at San Diego	Torero Stadium; San Diego, CA	WCC	L 3–28	1,563
October 22	1:00 p.m.	St. Thomas (MN)^{†}	Bailey Memorial Stadium; Clinton, SC	ESPN+	L 17–46	1,346
October 29	12:00 p.m.	at Marist	Tenney Stadium at Leonidoff Field; Poughkeepsie, NY	ESPN3	L 7–27	1,923
November 5	1:00 p.m.	Dayton	Bailey Memorial Stadium; Clinton, SC	ESPN+	L 28–52	1366
November 19	1:00 p.m.	at Stetson	Spec Martin Stadium; DeLand, FL	ESPN+	L 21–42	1600
*Non-conference game; ^{†}Homecoming; All times are in Eastern time

== Game summaries ==
=== At Austin Peay ===
	1	2	3	4	Total
Blue Hose	0	0	0	0	0
Governors	21	21	14	7	63

=== Virginia–Lynchburg ===
	1	2	3	4	Total
Dragons	7	0	0	6	13
Blue Hose	0	7	7	7	21

=== At Western Carolina ===
	1	2	3	4	Total
Blue Hose	0	7	7	7	21
Catamounts	7	21	28	21	77

=== Davidson ===
	1	2	3	4	Total
Wildcats	14	21	0	21	56
Blue Hose	3	7	7	7	24

=== At Morehead State ===
	1	2	3	4	Total
Blue Hose	0	0	0	10	10
Eagles	7	7	0	0	14

According to ESPN+ commentary, the deciding factor in the game was "the touchdown that wasn't called" for Presbyterian. A completed pass into the end zone was not awarded as a touchdown by the official, probably because he mistook the goal-line of the soccer pitch as the back of the end zone.

=== Valparaiso ===
	1	2	3	4	Total
Beacons	7	7	7	20	41
Blue Hose	7	14	0	0	21

=== At San Diego ===
	1	2	3	4	Total
Blue Hose	0	0	3	0	3
Toreros	7	7	7	7	28

=== St. Thomas (MN) ===
	1	2	3	4	Total
Tommies	0	14	22	10	46
Blue Hose	10	7	0	0	17

=== At Marist ===
	1	2	3	4	Total
Blue Hose	0	0	0	7	7
Red Foxes	7	13	10	7	37

=== Dayton ===
	1	2	3	4	Total
Flyers	21	14	10	7	52
Blue Hose	7	7	7	7	28

Blue Hose freshman Dominic Kibby caught 7 passes for 212 yards, including 3 touchdowns. This places him third for single-game receiving yards (second for games against D1 opposition) and ties him at second for most touchdown receptions in a single game for Presbyterian College, or outright second in games against D1 opponents.

=== At Stetson ===
	1	2	3	4	Total
Blue Hose	0	7	7	7	21
Hatters	7	7	14	14	42
