= DuWayne Deitz =

American football player and coach

Biographical details
- Born: December 7, 1930
- Died: August 22, 2018 (aged 87)

Playing career

Football
- 1952–1954: St. Thomas

Track and field
- 1952–1955: St. Thomas
- Position: Offensive tackle

Coaching career (HC unless noted)

Football
- 1956–1957: Minneapolis Marshall High School (asst.)
- 1958–1961: Minneapolis Marshall HS
- 1962–1969: White Bear Lake Area High School
- 1970–1980: St. Thomas

Track and field
- 1956–1962: Minneapolis Marshall High School
- 1970–after 1980: St. Thomas (asst.)

Wrestling
- 1956–1962: Minneapolis Marshall High School

Head coaching record
- Overall: 52–52–2 (college)

Accomplishments and honors

Championships
- Football; 2 MIAC (1973, 1979)

Awards
- 2× MIAC Coach of the Year (1973, 1979)

DuWayne Richard Deitz (December 7, 1930 – August 22, 2018) was an American football coach and offensive tackle. He served as the head coach at the University of St. Thomas from 1970 to 1980, compiling a record of 52–52–2.

== Early life and education ==
Deitz was born on December 7, 1930. He attended Minneapolis Southwest High School and was named conference MVP for football in 1948. After graduating from there, Deitz served with the United States Marines in the Korean Conflict, being awarded the Purple Heart and a Presidential Unit Citation.

In 1952, Deitz joined the University of St. Thomas, where he was team captain in football and track. Deitz was named Catholic All-American in 1954 and also was a MIAC champion in shot put. He played offensive tackle. Deitz graduated with a Bachelor of Science degree and a Master of Education degree.

== Coaching career ==
In 1956, Deitz was hired by Minneapolis Marshall High School as an assistant football coach, wrestling coach, and track and field coach. He was promoted to head football coach in 1958, after the resignation of Norm Kragseth. He was named Minneapolis City Coach of the Year in 1961.

On April 12, 1962, Deitz resigned from Minneapolis Marshall to accept a position as head football coach at White Bear Lake High School. "Marshall's enrollment is down and it will be down more by next fall. I just feel in the long run I can do better coaching at a school like White Bear," he said. Deitz ended up coaching eight seasons at White Bear Lake, compiling an overall record of 50–18–4. His final game with the team was the 1969 Suburban Conference football championship game, a 25–20 win over Kellogg High School.

In January 1970, Deitz, one of 30 applicants, was chosen to be the next head football coach at the University of St. Thomas. In his first year, the St. Thomas Tommies compiled a record of 1–9. They improved to 3–7 in 1971, 6–4 in 1972, and by his fourth season the Tommies went 9–1 for their first conference championship since 1956. For this, he was named the 1973 Minnesota Intercollegiate Athletic Conference (MIAC) Coach of the Year. In the subsequent years, St. Thomas compiled records of 5–4 (1974), 3–6 (1975), 7–3 (1976), 4–5–1 (1977), and 5–4 (1978). In 1979, he was awarded for the second time MIAC Coach of the Year, after stunning 7–1 St. John's in the season finale, 30–0, to force a four-way tie for the conference championship between St. Thomas, St. John's, Concordia, and St. Olaf.

Deitz later stated that the 1979 season "was probably the most frustrating but also most rewarding" in his career as a coach. The Tommies started the season dealing with several starters who decided not to return, multiple injuries, and one player's death. They started the season 1–2, but had a 4–0 home record and closed the year with four consecutive wins. "We lacked depth, yet we had some freshmen that came through for us," Deitz said. Among the players on the roster that year was wide receiver Jim Gustafson, who caught the game-winning touchdown pass against Concordia and later made it to the National Football League (NFL).

Following the 1980 season, in which the Tommies went 3–6–1, Deitz resigned. His career record at the school was 52–52–2. "I've been thinking about giving up football for some time," he said. "It's time I turned over the job to somebody else. I'd like to start spending more time with my wife and family."

While at St. Thomas, Deitz coached each of his three sons: Dan, a defensive back; Doug, a quarterback; and Dave, a center. Doug Deitz was later inducted into the St. Thomas Athletic Hall of Fame.

== Later life and death ==
Deitz later served as a member of the St. Thomas physical education faculty. From 1981 to 1984, he served as a member of the White Bear Lake school board. He was inducted into the White Bear Lake High Athletic Hall of Fame and the Minnesota Old Timers Football Coaches Association Hall of Fame.

Deitz died on August 22, 2018, at the age of 87.

== Head coaching record ==
=== College football ===
Year	Team	Overall	Conference	Standing	Bowl/playoffs
St. Thomas Tommies (Minnesota Intercollegiate Athletic Conference) (1970–1980)
1970	St. Thomas	1–9	1–6	8th	
1971	St. Thomas	3–7	2–5	6th	
1972	St. Thomas	6–4	3–4	5th	
1973	St. Thomas	9–1	6–1	1st	
1974	St. Thomas	5–4	4–3	5th	
1975	St. Thomas	3–6	3–4	7th	
1976	St. Thomas	7–3	5–2	T–2nd	
1977	St. Thomas	4–5–1	3–3–1	4th	
1978	St. Thomas	5–4	4–4	5th	
1979	St. Thomas	6–3	6–2	T–1st	
1980	St. Thomas	3–6–1	2–5–1	7th	
St. Thomas:		52–52–2	39–39–2		
Total:		52–52–2			
National championship Conference title Conference division title or championship game berth
