= Vic Wallace =

American football and wrestling coach

Biographical details
- Born: c. 1942
- Education: Northern Iowa; Cornell (IA)

Coaching career (HC unless noted)

Football
- 1974–1976: Carroll (WI) (assistant)
- 1977–1979: Morningside (OC)
- 1980: Texas Tech (OC)
- 1981–1986: William Jewell
- 1987–1992: St. Thomas (MN)
- 1993–2007: Lambuth
- 2011–2014: Rockford

Wrestling
- 1974–1977: Carroll (WI)
- 1977–1978: Morningside

Head coaching record
- Overall: 180–145–1 (football)
- Tournaments: Football; 9–6 (NAIA D-II playoffs); 1–1 (NCAA D-III playoffs); 1–3 (NAIA playoffs)

Accomplishments and honors

Championships
- Football; 3 HAAC (1981–1982, 1985); 1 MIAC (1990); 4 MSC (1994–1996, 2003)

Vic Wallace (born c. 1942) is an American former football and wrestling coach. He served as the head football coach at William Jewell College in Liberty, Missouri from 1981 to 1986, St. Thomas University in St. Paul, Minnesota from 1987 to 1992, Lambuth University in Jackson, Tennessee from 1993 to 2007, and Rockford University in Rockford, Illinois from 2011 to 2014, compiling a career college football coaching record of 180–145–1. Wallace was also the head wrestling coach at Carroll College—now known as Carroll University—in Waukesha, Wisconsin from 1974 to 1977 and Morningside College in Sioux City, Iowa from 1977 to 1978. He spent the 1980 football season as the offensive coordinator at Texas Tech University.

== Head coaching record ==
=== Football ===
Year	Team	Overall	Conference	Standing	Bowl/playoffs	NAIA^{#}
William Jewell Cardinals (Heart of America Athletic Conference) (1981–1980)
1981	William Jewell	11–1	8–0	1st	L NAIA Division II Semifinal	
1982	William Jewell	10–2	7–0	T–1st	L NAIA Division II Championship	
1983	William Jewell	9–2–1	5–1–1	2nd	L NAIA Division II Semifinal	
1984	William Jewell	7–2–1	5–2	T–2nd		
1985	William Jewell	7–3	6–1	T–1st		
1986	William Jewell	4–6	4–3	T–2nd		
William Jewell:		48–16–2	35–7–1			
St. Thomas Tommies (Minnesota Intercollegiate Athletic Conference) (1987–1992)
1987	St. Thomas	5–5	5–4	T–4th		
1988	St. Thomas	3–7	3–6	T–6th		
1989	St. Thomas	4–5–1	4–4–1	7th		
1990	St. Thomas	8–3–1	7–2	T–1st	L NCAA Division III Quarterfinal	
1991	St. Thomas	6–3	5–3	T–3rd		
1992	St. Thomas	4–7	3–6	8th		
St. Thomas:		30–30–2	27–25–1			
Lambuth Eagles (Mid-South Conference) (1993–2007)
1993	Lambuth	6–4	3–2	2nd		
1994	Lambuth	10–3	4–1	1st	L NAIA Division II Semifinal	
1995	Lambuth	10–1–1	7–0–1	1st	L NAIA Division II Semifinal	
1996	Lambuth	9–2	7–0	1st	L NAIA Division II Quarterfinal	
1997	Lambuth	4–6	2–4	T–5th		
1998	Lambuth	7–3	5–2	3rd		
1999	Lambuth	8–4	6–1	2nd	L NAIA Quarterfinal	14
2000	Lambuth	7–4	6–1	2nd	L NAIA First Round	11
2001	Lambuth	3–6	3–4	T–4th		
2002	Lambuth	6–4	5–3	3rd		
2003	Lambuth	9–3	8–1	T–1st	L NAIA First Round	10
2004	Lambuth	6–4	6–4	4th		
2005	Lambuth	5–6	3–3	T–2nd (West)		
2006	Lambuth	4–7	1–4	T–4th (West)		
2007	Lambuth	3–8	2–3	T–4th (West)		
Lambuth:		97–65–1	68–33–1			
Rockford Regents (Northern Athletics Conference / Northern Athletics Collegiate Conference) (2011–2014)
2011	Rockford	0–10	0–7	8th		
2012	Rockford	2–8	1–6	7th		
2013	Rockford	1–9	0–6	7th		
2014	Rockford	2–8	1–5	T–5th		
Rockford:		5–35	2–24			
Total:		180–145–1				
National championship Conference title Conference division title or championship game berth
