= 1956 St. Thomas Tommies football team =

American college football season

1956 St. Thomas Tommies football

MIAC champion
- Conference: Minnesota Intercollegiate Athletic Conference
- Record: 8–0 (7–0 MIAC)
- Head coach: Frank Deig (11th season)
- Captain: Tom Turk
- Home stadium: O'Shaughnessy Stadium

1956 Minnesota Intercollegiate Athletic Conference football standings
	Conf.					Overall
Team	W		L		T	W		L		T
St. Thomas (MN) $	7	–	0	–	0	8	–	0	–	0
Concordia (MN)	5	–	2	–	0	6	–	3	–	0
Macalester	4	–	3	–	0	5	–	3	–	0
Gustavus Adolphus	4	–	3	–	0	4	–	5	–	0
Minnesota–Duluth	3	–	4	–	0	3	–	4	–	0
Saint John's (MN)	2	–	4	–	1	3	–	4	–	1
Augsburg	2	–	4	–	1	2	–	5	–	1
Hamline	0	–	7	–	0	1	–	7	–	0
$ – Conference champion

The 1956 St. Thomas Tommies football team represented the University of St. Thomas of Saint Paul, Minnesota, as a member of the Minnesota Intercollegiate Athletic Conference (MIAC) during the 1956 NAIA football season. In their eleventh year under head coach Frank Deig, the Tommies compiled a perfect 8–0 record (7–0 against MIAC opponents), won the MIAC championship, and outscored opponents by a total of 212 to 77. St. Thomas had prior perfect seasons in 1910, 1913, 1923, 1942, and 1944; they have not had another since 1956.

Three St. Thomas players were selected by the Minneapolis Sunday Tribune as first-team players on the 1956 All-MIAC football team: quarterback Bernie Raetz; end Dick Trafas; and tackle John Heller. Tom Turk and Dick Sappo were named to the second team as guards.

The team played its home games on O'Shaughnessy Stadium in Saint Paul, Minnesota.

== Schedule ==
Date	Opponent	Site	Result	Attendance	Source
September 21	Augsburg	O'Shaughnessy Stadium; Saint Paul, MN	W 34–12	4,342	
September 28	Macalester	O'Shaughnessy Stadium; Saint Paul, MN	W 12–7	6,347	
October 6	at Minnesota Duluth	Duluth, MN	W 34–14		
October 13	at Concordia (MN)	Moorhead, MN	W 18–13		
October 19	Gustavus Adolphus	O'Shaughnessy Stadium; Saint Paul, MN	W 14–0	9,245	
October 26	Hamline	O'Shaughnessy Stadium; Saint Paul, MN	W 33–6	3,756	
November 3	at Saint John's (MN)	Collegeville, MN	W 33–25		
November 11	at Loras*	Dubuque, IA	W 34–0		
*Non-conference game

== Players ==
The following players are listed in the coverage cited above:

- John Amelse, end
- Jim Andresick, right halfback
- John Benedict, guard
- Jerry Castle, fullback
- Doc Dolan, left halfback
- Walter Dziedzic, tackle
- Pat Gorman, right halfback
- John Heller, tackle
- Roger Ilstrup, T-quarterback
- Earl Mergens, substitute end
- Bernie Raetz, quarterback
- Dick Sappa, center/guard
- Dick Trafas, end
- Tom Turk, guard and captain, senior, 175 pounds
- Jerry Wright, fullback
