= Nic Musty =

American athlete and coach (1906–1996)

Biographical details
- Born: December 5, 1906; Bellechester, Minnesota, U.S.
- Died: November 17, 1996 (aged 89); Crow Wing County, Minnesota, U.S.

Playing career

Basketball
- 1925–1929: Saint Mary's

Football
- 1925–1928: Saint Mary's

Baseball
- 1925–1928: Saint Mary's
- Positions: Guard, center (basketball); End (football); Third baseman (baseball)

Coaching career (HC unless noted)

Football
- 1929–1932: Saint Mary's (asst.)
- 1933: Saint Mary's
- 1934–1935: St. Thomas (asst.)
- 1936: St. Thomas Military
- 1937–1940: St. Thomas

Basketball
- 1929–1934: Saint Mary's
- 1937–1940: St. Thomas

Administrative career (AD unless noted)
- 1929–1933: Saint Mary's (director of intramural sports)
- 1936: St. Thomas (director of prep athletics)
- 1937–1940: St. Thomas

Nicholas John Musty Sr. (December 5, 1906 – November 17, 1996) was an American athlete and sports coach.

== Early life and education ==
Musty was born on December 5, 1906, in Bellechester, Minnesota, and attended Red Wing High School. After graduating in 1925, Musty enrolled at Saint Mary's University of Minnesota, where he played football, baseball, and basketball. His position in football was end; his position in baseball was third baseman; and in basketball he played as a guard and center. As a junior, Musty was named team captain in both basketball and baseball. He was described as a "sturdy running guard" and "one of the best ball handlers on the squad." An article from The Minneapolis Star called Musty "one of the best football ends ever turned out at St. Mary's."

== Coaching career ==
After graduating from Saint Mary's in 1929, Musty accepted a position as assistant football coach, head basketball coach, and director of intramural sports at the school. In 1932, he was promoted to head football coach for the 1933 season. He was the youngest head coach in the conference, being only 26 in his first year. After compiling a 3–3–1 football record in 1933, Musty resigned to study medicine at Saint Mary's.

While studying at Saint Mary's in 1934, Musty accepted a position as assistant football coach at the University of St. Thomas.

In 1936, Musty was appointed head football coach at St. Thomas Military Academy.

After one year at the military academy, Musty was named athletic director, head football coach and head basketball coach at the University of St. Thomas. St. Thomas compiled a 2–3–2 record in their first year under Musty. In his third season as football coach, 1939, Musty led St. Thomas to the conference championship with a 6–1–1 record. Following the 1940 season, he resigned to enter the medical profession. He was succeeded by Frank Deig as basketball coach and athletic director. Willie Walsh succeeded him as football coach.

== Later life and death ==
Musty later practiced medicine in Minneapolis for many years, retiring in 1972.

Musty served as a flight surgeon in World War II and was awarded the Bronze Star Medal.

In 1995, Musty was inducted into the St. Thomas Athletic Hall of Fame.

Musty died on November 17, 1996, at the age of 89.

== Head coaching record ==
=== College football ===
Year	Team	Overall	Conference	Standing	Bowl/playoffs
Saint Mary's Redmen (Minnesota Intercollegiate Athletic Conference) (1933)
1933	Saint Mary's	3–3–1	2–2–1	4th	
Saint Mary's:		3–3–1	2–2–1		
St. Thomas Tommies (Minnesota Intercollegiate Athletic Conference) (1937–1940)
1937	St. Thomas	2–3–2	1–1–2	4th	
1938	St. Thomas	6–2	4–1	T–2nd	
1939	St. Thomas	6–1–1	4–0–1	1st	
1940	St. Thomas	5–3	4–1	2nd	
St. Thomas:		19–9–3	13–3–3		
Total:		22–12–4			
National championship Conference title Conference division title or championship game berth
