= Frank Deig =

American football player and coach (1909–1960)

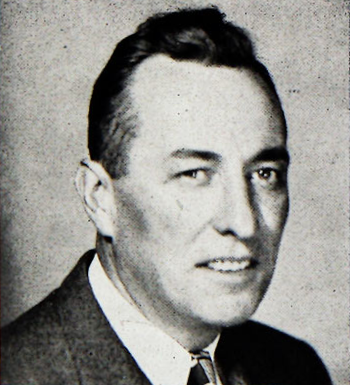
- Deig in 1948

Biographical details
- Born: c. 1909; Black Township, Indiana, U.S.
- Died: October 28, 1960 (aged 50); Mower County, Minnesota, U.S.

Playing career

Football
- 1928–1930: Marquette
- Position: Fullback

Coaching career (HC unless noted)

Football
- 1934–1936: St. Augustine HS (MN)
- 1937–1945: Saint Thomas Academy (MN)
- 1946–1957: St. Thomas (MN)

Basketball
- 1934–1937: St. Augustine (MN)
- 1937–1940: Saint Thomas Academy (MN)
- 1940–1946: St. Thomas (MN)

Administrative career (AD unless noted)
- 1941–1958: St. Thomas (MN)

Head coaching record
- Overall: 57–36–2 (college football)
- Bowls: 0–0–1

Accomplishments and honors

Championships
- Football; 4 MIAC (1947–1949, 1956)

Francis J. Deig (c. 1909 – October 28, 1960) was an American athlete and sports coach. He served as the head football coach at the University of St. Thomas from 1946 to 1957, the head basketball coach at St. Thomas from 1940 to 1946, and the athletic director of St. Thomas from 1941 to 1958. He played college football at Marquette University.

== Early life and education ==
Francis J. Deig was born in c. 1909 and grew up in the Mount Vernon, Indiana, area. He first attended St. Matthew Parochial School before transferring to Mount Vernon High School. He later transferred a second time to Jasper Academy, where he starred in football, basketball, and baseball. He had a batting average of .484 as a senior at Jasper Academy, a record that was still standing by 1949. After graduating from there, Deig enrolled at Marquette University. He played football at Marquette and reportedly earned All-American honors as well as All-Western honors. At Marquette, he played from 1928 to 1930 as a fullback, gaining a reputation as a hard-hitter. As a senior in 1930, he scored five touchdowns and placed second on the team in scoring with 30 points. At the conclusion of his collegiate career, he was selected for the Dixie Classic all-star game.

According to The Minneapolis Star, Deig was considered one of Marquette's greatest fullbacks. His fame at Marquette led to him receiving a position at a Milwaukee restaurant. According to the Star, there,

His duties were to visit the cafe each day, sit at a center table, order, and eat. It was also stipulated that Deig had to eat with relish and with gusto, including polite smacking of the lips and long, contented sighs ... And – emblazoned all over the glittering restaurant front was this sign: "DEIG EATS HERE."

== Coaching career ==
Deig joined St. Augustine High School in 1934, coaching their football and basketball teams. The 1935 football team went undefeated and scored 275 points, the highest among state high schools. A 1936 article in the Star Tribune wrote "Down at Austin they are mighty proud of the St. Augustine high school team ... The team is coached by Francis Deig, former Marquette university end [sic] (Note: Deig was a fullback at Marquette.) who won All-American mention four years ago. All of the townspeople are talking about it. The team is big and experienced. Deig has been working on his present squad for three years and many say it is one of the best coached they have ever seen."

In 1937, Deig became a coach and physical education faculty at Saint Thomas Academy. Through October 1937, he had won 24 straight games as a coach, including his time at St. Augustine. He served as head basketball coach at Saint Thomas until 1940 and as head football coach through 1945. His football team compiled a record of 52–11–7, winning six conference championships.

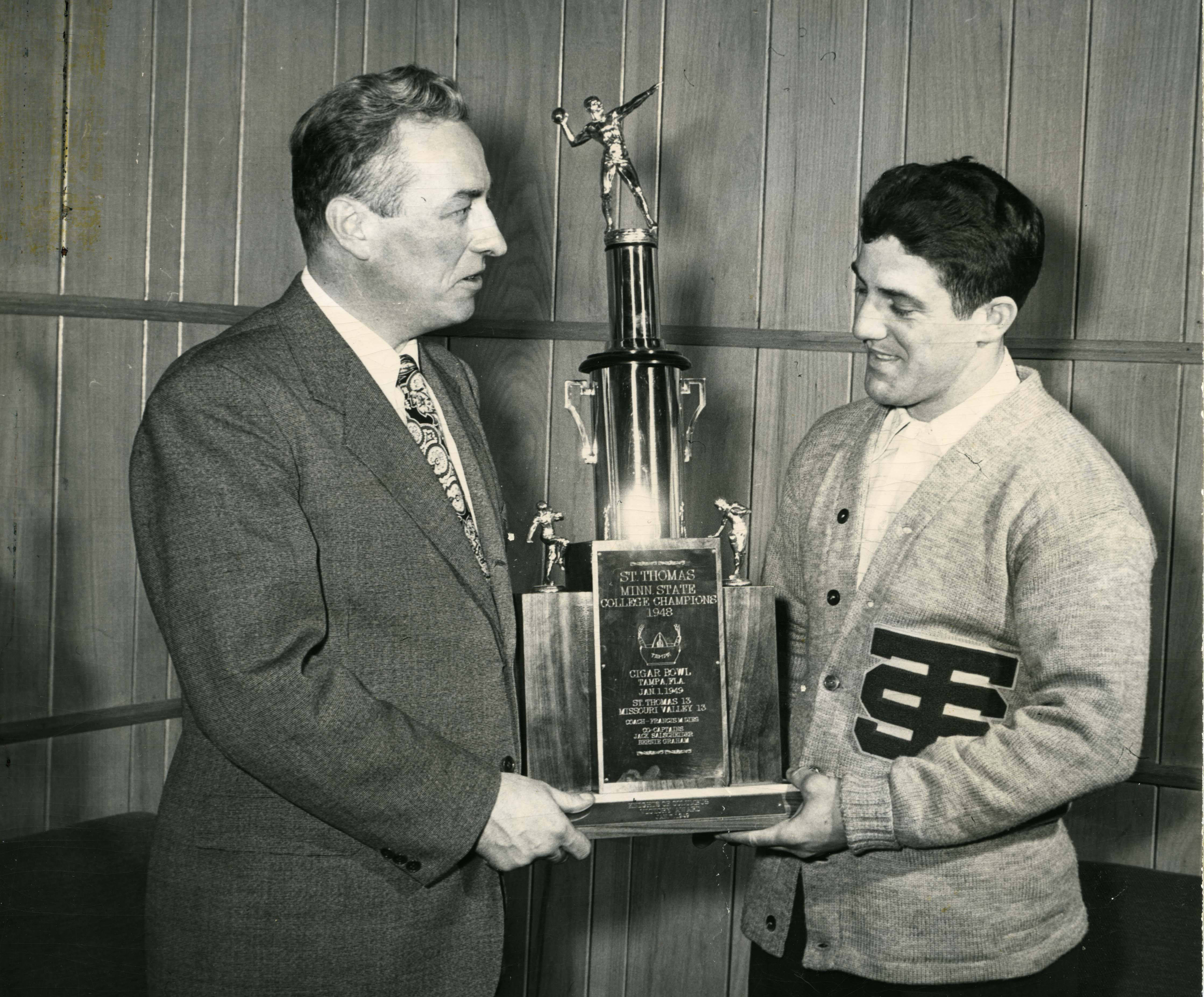
Deig and Jack Salscheider with the Cigar Bowl trophy in 1949

In 1940, Deig was appointed the athletic director and head basketball coach at the University of St. Thomas, replacing Nic Musty, whose resignation went into effect at the start of 1941. By the start of 1946, his record as head basketball coach was 71–28. In January 1946, he was named head football coach as well. The 1946 St. Thomas football team went 4–3, placing second in the Minnesota Intercollegiate Athletic Conference (MIAC). In just his second year with the football team, Deig led them to the conference championship. He led them to the championship again in 1948 and for a third consecutive year in 1949, also helping them achieve a Cigar Bowl berth in 1949. The Cigar Bowl invitation was the first bowl invite ever for a team in the MIAC. In 1956, he led St. Thomas to a fourth MIAC championship with an undefeated 8–0 record. He resigned in 1958.

Deig received a Bachelor of Arts from St. Thomas in 1941. By the end of his coaching career, he held the school wins record and was the only coach in team history to have won four MIAC championships. His undefeated 1956 season earned him National Catholic Small College Coach of the Year honors. Deig was inducted into the University of St. Thomas Athletics Hall of Fame in 1983.

== Later life and death ==
After his coaching career, Deig worked for a St. Paul investment firm as a salesman. Two years after his retirement, he died on October 28, 1960, aged 50, in Mower County, Minnesota, from a heart attack.

== Head coaching record ==
=== College football ===
Year	Team	Overall	Conference	Standing	Bowl/playoffs
St. Thomas Tommies (Minnesota Intercollegiate Athletic Conference) (1946–1957)
1946	St. Thomas	4–3	3–1	T–2nd	
1947	St. Thomas	4–3	4–0	T–1st	
1948	St. Thomas	7–1–1	5–0	1st	T Cigar Bowl
1949	St. Thomas	6–2	6–0	1st	
1950	St. Thomas	5–3	5–1	2nd	
1951	St. Thomas	6–2	5–1	T–2nd	
1952	St. Thomas	3–5	3–3	T–4th	
1953	St. Thomas	3–5	2–4	7th	
1954	St. Thomas	5–3	4–2	T–3rd	
1955	St. Thomas	4–4	3–3	T–5th	
1956	St. Thomas	8–0	7–0	1st	
1957	St. Thomas	2–5–1	1–5–1	7th	
St. Thomas:		57–36–2	48–20–1		
Total:		57–36–2			
National championship Conference title Conference division title or championship game berth
