= 1945 Gustavus Adolphus Golden Gusties football team =

College football season

1945 Gustavus Adolphus Golden Gusties football

MIAC champion
- Conference: Minnesota Intercollegiate Athletic Conference
- Record: 6–0 (4–0 MIAC)
- Head coach: Tuddie Lindenberg (2nd season)

1945 Minnesota Intercollegiate Athletic Conference football standings
	Conf.					Overall
Team	W		L		T	W		L		T
Gustavus Adolphus $	4	–	0	–	0	6	–	0	–	0
St. Thomas (MN)	3	–	1	–	0	5	–	1	–	0
Macalester	2	–	1	–	0	3	–	1	–	0
St. Olaf	1	–	2	–	0	2	–	3	–	0
Saint John's (MN)	1	–	4	–	0	1	–	6	–	0
Concordia (MN)	0	–	1	–	0	2	–	2	–	2
Augsburg	0	–	1	–	0	0	–	3	–	0
Saint Mary's (MN)	0	–	1	–	0	0	–	5	–	0
$ – Conference champion

The 1945 Gustavus Adolphus Golden Gusties football team represented Gustavus Adolphus College of St. Peter, Minnesota, as a member of the Minnesota Intercollegiate Athletic Conference (MIAC) during the 1945 college football season. In their second year under head coach Tuddie Lindenberg, the Gusties compiled a 6–0 record (4–0 against MIAC opponents), won the MIAC championship, and outscored opponents by a total of 140 to 19.

== Schedule ==
Date	Opponent	Site	Result	Source
September 8	at Saint Mary's (MN)	Maxwell Field; Winona, MN	W 21–0	
September 21	St. Olaf	Saint Peter, MN	W 8–6	
September 28	Saint John's (MN)	Saint Peter, MN	W 38–0	
October 13	St. Thomas (MN)	Saint Peter, MN	W 20–13	
October 19	at Augustana (SD)*	Sioux Falls, SD	W 20–0	
November 3	Augustana (SD)*	Saint Peter, MN	W 33–0	
*Non-conference game
