= 1942 St. Thomas Tommies football team =

American college football season

1942 St. Thomas Tommies football

MIAC champion
- Conference: Minnesota Intercollegiate Athletic Conference
- Record: 8–0 (5–0 MIAC)
- Head coach: Willie Walsh (2nd season)
- Home stadium: O'Shaughnessy Field

1942 Minnesota Intercollegiate Athletic Conference football standings
	Conf.					Overall
Team	W		L		T	W		L		T
St. Thomas (MN) +	5	–	0	–	0	8	–	0	–	0
Concordia (MN) +	3	–	0	–	1	6	–	0	–	1
Saint John's (MN)	4	–	1	–	1	4	–	1	–	1
Hamline	3	–	2	–	0	3	–	2	–	0
Gustavus Adolphus	2	–	2	–	0	4	–	4	–	0
Macalester	2	–	3	–	0	4	–	4	–	0
St. Olaf	2	–	3	–	0	2	–	4	–	1
Saint Mary's (MN)	0	–	5	–	0	1	–	7	–	0
Augsburg	0	–	5	–	0	0	–	6	–	0
+ – Conference co-champions

The 1942 St. Thomas Tommies football team was an American football team that represented the University of St. Thomas of Saint Paul, Minnesota, as a member of the Minnesota Intercollegiate Athletic Conference (MIAC) during the 1942 college football season. In their second year under head coach Willie Walsh, the Tommies compiled a perfect 8–0 record (5–0 against MIAC opponents), won the MIAC championship, and outscored all opponents by a total of 153 to 22. On defense, they shut out four of eight opponents and gave up an average of only 2.75 points per game. St. Thomas had additional perfect seasons in 1910, 1913, 1923, 1944, and 1956.

St. Thomas took six of the eleven first-team spots on the 1942 All-MIAC football teams selected by both the United Press and the conference coaches. First-team honors went to the following St. Thomas players: halfback Gene Neitge (UP-1, Coaches-1), fullback Bob Pates (UP-1, Coaches-1), end Dick Jewett (UP-1, Coaches-1), tackle Frank Wambach (UP-1, Coaches-1), guard John Knox (UP-1, Coaches-1), center Gene O'Brien (UP-1, Coaches-1).

The team played its home games at O'Shaugnessy Field in Saint Paul, Minnesota.

== Schedule ==
Date	Opponent	Site	Result	Attendance	Source
September 18	Bemidji State*	O'Shaugnessy Field; Saint Paul, MN	W 6–0		
September 25	Macalester	O'Shaugnessy Field; Saint Paul, MN	W 12–0		
October 2	Saint Mary's (MN)	O'Shaugnessy Field; Saint Paul, MN	W 20–6		
October 9	Gustavus Adolphus	O'Shaugnessy Field; Saint Paul, MN	W 27–2		
October 16	at St. Ambrose*	Municipal Stadium; Davenport, IA	W 35–7	5,000	
October 23	at St. Olaf	Northfield, MN	W 28–0		
October 30	Saint John's (MN)	O'Shaugnessy Field; Saint Paul, MN	W 18–0		
November 8	at Loras*	Dubuque, IA	W 14–7		
*Non-conference game
