= Jonathan Johnson (American football) =

American football coach (born c. 1990)

Current position
- Title: Head coach
- Team: Doane
- Conference: GPAC
- Record: 5–16

Biographical details
- Born: c. 1990 (age 35–36)
- Education: Belhaven University (2013)

Playing career
- 2009–2011: Belhaven
- Position: Defensive end

Coaching career (HC unless noted)
- 2012–2013: Belhaven (GA)
- 2014–2015: Mississippi Gulf Coast (FB/TE/OL)
- 2016–2017: Stetson (DL)
- 2018: Pearl River (ST/DL)
- 2019: Pearl River (DC/DL)
- 2020 (spring): UNC Pembroke (DL)
- 2020: Hocking (AHC/DC)
- 2021: Stetson (LB)
- 2022: Stetson (DC/LB)
- 2023: Hilbert (AHC/DC)
- 2024–present: Doane

Head coaching record
- Overall: 5–16

Jonathan "J. J." Johnson (born c. 1990) is an American college football coach. He is the head football coach for Doane University, a position he has held since 2024. He also coached for Belhaven, Mississippi Gulf Coast Community College, Stetson, Pearl River Community College, UNC Pembroke, Hocking College, and Hilbert. He played college football for Belhaven as a defensive end.

== Head coaching record ==
Year	Team	Overall	Conference	Standing	Bowl/playoffs
Doane Tigers (Great Plains Athletic Conference) (2024–present)
2024	Doane	3–8	3–7	8th	
2025	Doane	2–8	2–8	10th	
2026	Doane	0–0	0–0		
Doane:		5–16	5–15		
Total:		5–16			
