= Jim Gustafson =

American football player (born 1961)

No. 80
- Position: Wide receiver

Personal information
- Born: March 16, 1961 (age 65); Minneapolis, Minnesota, U.S.
- Listed height: 6 ft 1 in (1.85 m)
- Listed weight: 177 lb (80 kg)

Career information
- High school: Lincoln (Bloomington, Minnesota)
- College: St. Thomas
- NFL draft: 1983: undrafted

Career history
- Cincinnati Bengals (1983)*; Minnesota Vikings (1986–1990)
- * Offseason or practice squad member only

Career NFL statistics
- Receptions: 38
- Receiving yards: 491
- Receiving touchdowns: 5
- Stats at Pro Football Reference

James Joel Gustafson (born March 16, 1961) is an American former professional football player who was a wide receiver for the Minnesota Vikings of the National Football League (NFL). He played college football for the St. Thomas Tommies.
