= St. Thomas Tommies (Minnesota) football =

American college football team

2026 St. Thomas Tommies football team
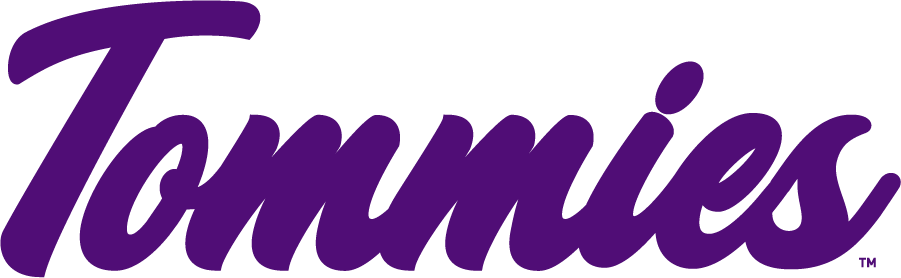
- First season: 1904; 122 years ago
- Athletic director: Phil Esten
- Head coach: Glenn Caruso; 17th season, 164–39 (.808)
- Location: Saint Paul, Minnesota
- Stadium: O'Shaughnessy Stadium (capacity: 5,025)
- NCAA division: Division I FCS
- Conference: Pioneer Football League
- Colors: Purple and gray
- All-time record: 661–338–32 (.657)

Conference championships
- MIAC: 1922, 1929, 1930, 1941, 1942, 1946, 1947, 1948, 1949, 1956, 1973, 1979, 1983, 1990, 2010, 2011, 2012, 2015, 2016, 2017, 2019 PFL: 2022
- Rivalries: Drake; Saint John's (MN) (former)
- Mascot: Tommies
- Website: tommiesports.com

The St. Thomas Tommies football program represents University of St. Thomas in Saint Paul, Minnesota. Football began at the university in the late 1890s and the first official varsity intercollegiate games were played in 1904. St. Thomas was a charter member of the Minnesota Intercollegiate Athletic Conference, formed in 1920. The Tommies also appeared at the 1949 Cigar Bowl. In 2019, the MIAC announced that St. Thomas would be "involuntarily removed" from the conference at the end of the spring 2021 athletic season citing "athletic competitive parity" concerns. St. Thomas received approval from the NCAA to begin competing at the NCAA Division I FCS level as a member of the Pioneer Football League starting with the 2021 season and became the first program to jump from NCAA Division III directly to Division I FCS.

== Conference championships ==
Year	Conference	Coach	Overall record	Conference record
1922†	Minnesota Intercollegiate Athletic Conference (D-III)	Joe Brandy	8–1	4–0
1929	Minnesota Intercollegiate Athletic Conference (D-III)	Joe Boland	7–2	4–2
1930†	Minnesota Intercollegiate Athletic Conference (D-III)	Joe Boland	7–2	5–0
1939	Minnesota Intercollegiate Athletic Conference (D-III)	Nic Musty	5–3	4–1
1941	Minnesota Intercollegiate Athletic Conference (D-III)	Willie Walsh	7–1	5–0
1942†	Minnesota Intercollegiate Athletic Conference (D-III)	Willie Walsh	8–0	5–0
1946†	Minnesota Intercollegiate Athletic Conference (D-III)	Frank Deig	4–3	3–1
1947†	Minnesota Intercollegiate Athletic Conference (D-III)	Frank Deig	4–3	4–0
1948†	Minnesota Intercollegiate Athletic Conference (D-III)	Frank Deig	7–1–1	5–0
1949	Minnesota Intercollegiate Athletic Conference (D-III)	Frank Deig	6–2	6–0
1956	Minnesota Intercollegiate Athletic Conference (D-III)	Frank Deig	8–0	7–0
1973†	Minnesota Intercollegiate Athletic Conference (D-III)	DuWayne Deitz	9–1	6–1
1979†	Minnesota Intercollegiate Athletic Conference (D-III)	DuWayne Deitz	6–3	6–2
1983	Minnesota Intercollegiate Athletic Conference (D-III)	Mark Dienhart	9–2	9–0
1990†	Minnesota Intercollegiate Athletic Conference (D-III)	Vic Wallace	8–3–1	7–2
2010	Minnesota Intercollegiate Athletic Conference (D-III)	Glenn Caruso	12–1	8–0
2011	Minnesota Intercollegiate Athletic Conference (D-III)	Glenn Caruso	13–1	8–0
2012	Minnesota Intercollegiate Athletic Conference (D-III)	Glenn Caruso	14–1	8–0
2015	Minnesota Intercollegiate Athletic Conference (D-III)	Glenn Caruso	14–1	8–0
2016	Minnesota Intercollegiate Athletic Conference (D-III)	Glenn Caruso	12–1	8–0
2017	Minnesota Intercollegiate Athletic Conference (D-III)	Glenn Caruso	11–2	8–0
2019†	Minnesota Intercollegiate Athletic Conference (D-III)	Glenn Caruso	8–2	7–1
2022*	Pioneer Football League (D-I FCS)	Glenn Caruso	10–1	8–0

† Co-champions
* Ineligible for FCS postseason play due to transition from NCAA Division III

== Postseason appearances ==
=== NCAA Division III ===
The Tommies made nine appearances in the NCAA Division III football playoffs, with a combined record of 20–9.

Year	Round	Opponent	Result
1990	First round	UW–Whitewater	W, 24–23
1990	Quarterfinals	Central (IA)	L, 32–33
2009	First round	Monmouth (IL)	W, 43–21
2009	Second round	Coe	W, 34–7
2009	Quarterfinals	Linfield	L, 20–31
2010	First round	Benedictine (IL)	W, 57–10
2010	Second round	Linfield	W, 24–17 ^{2OT}
2010	Quarterfinals	Bethel (MN)	L, 7–12
2011	First round	St. Scholastica	W, 48–2
2011	Second round	Monmouth (IL)	W, 38–10
2011	Quarterfinals	St. John Fisher	W, 45–10
2011	Semifinals	UW–Whitewater	L, 0–20
2012	First round	St. Norbert	W, 48–17
2012	Second round	Elmhurst	W, 24–17
2012	Quarterfinals	Hobart	W, 47–7
2012	Semifinals	UW–Oshkosh	W, 28–14
2012	Stagg Bowl	Mount Union	L, 10–28
2014	First round	Wartburg	L, 31–37
2015	First round	La Verne	W, 57–14
2015	Second round	St. John's (MN)	W, 38–19
2015	Quarterfinals	Wabash	W, 38–7
2015	Semifinals	Linfield	W, 38–17
2015	Stagg Bowl	Mount Union	L, 35–49
2016	First round	Northwestern (MN)	W, 43–0
2016	Second round	Coe	W, 55–6
2016	Quarterfinals	UW–Oshkosh	L, 31–34
2017	First Round	Eureka	W, 47–8
2017	Second Round	Berry (GA)	W, 29–13
2017	Quarterfinals	Mary Hardin–Baylor	L, 10–24

=== NAIA ===
The Tommies made one appearance in the NAIA playoffs, with a record of 0–1.

Year	Round	Opponent	Result
1983	Quarterfinals	Northwestern (IA)	L, 10–17

== Notable former players ==
- Brady Beeson
- Al Culver
- Bud Daugherty
- DuWayne Deitz
- Jim Gustafson
- Walt Kiesling (Pro Football Hall of Fame inductee)

== Future non-conference opponents ==
Future non-conference opponents announced as of October 2, 2026.

2027	2028	2029
at South Dakota State	at Montana State	
