= O'Shaughnessy Stadium =

Multi-purpose stadium in St. Paul, Minnesota, United States

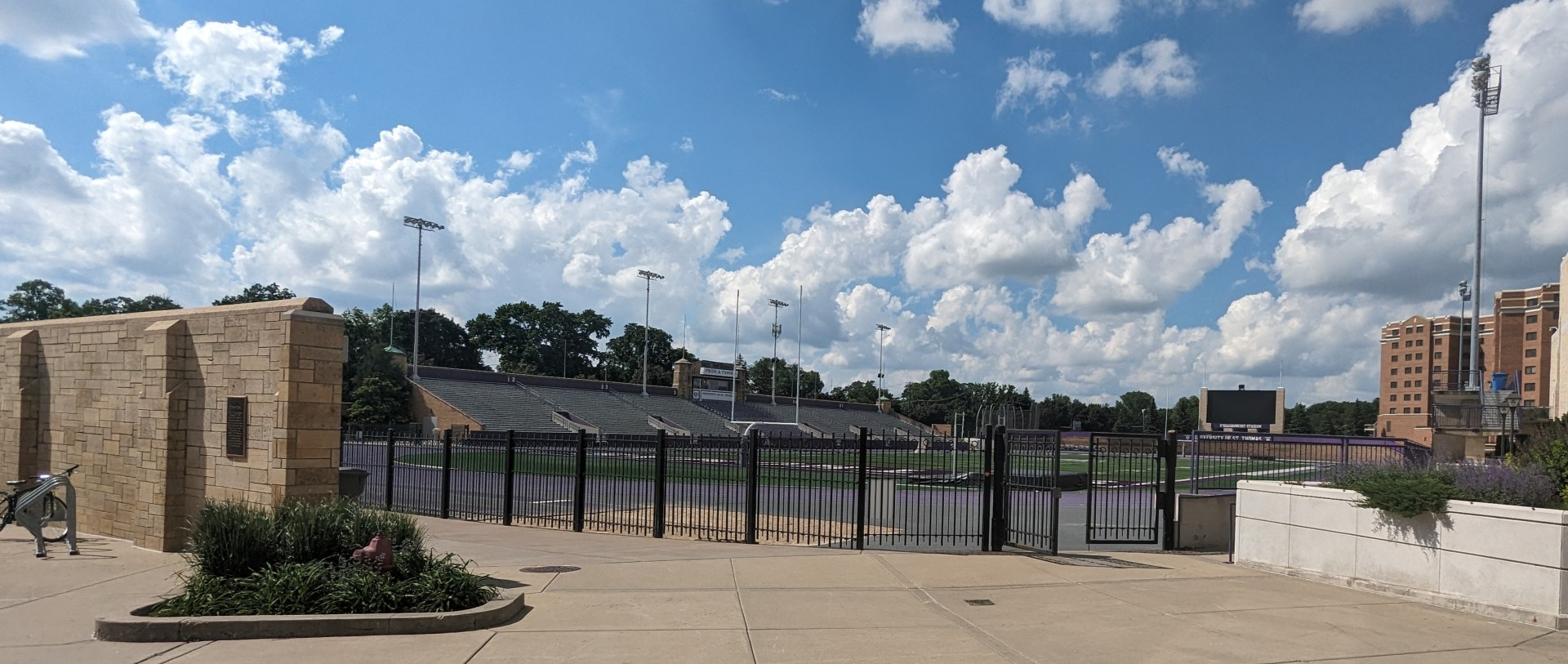
- Interactive map of O'Shaughnessy Stadium
- Address: 2115 Summit Avenue; Saint Paul; United States
- Location: St. Paul, Minnesota
- Coordinates: 44.943556°N 93.191631°W
- Owner: University of St. Thomas
- Operator: University of St. Thomas
- Capacity: 5,025
- Surface: Synthetic turf
- Record attendance: 12,483 on September 14, 2014

Construction
- Opened: 1948
- Architect: Ellerbe & Co.
- General contractor: Edward Dunningan Co.

Tenant
- St. Thomas Tommies (NCAA) (1948–present)

Website
- https://tommiesports.com/sports/2020/7/23/facilities-O-Shaughnessy-Stadium.aspx

O'Shaughnessy Stadium is a multi-purpose stadium in St. Paul, Minnesota. It is the home of the St. Thomas Tommies football and track and field teams, in addition to various intramural sports. Construction began on the stadium in 1940, with the completion of the south wall. However, the stadium was not finished until after 1947, following the end of WWII. Opened in 1948, the stadium was designed by architecture firm Ellerbe & Co. and built by Edward Dunningan Co. O'Shaughnessy Stadium is named for Ignatius O'Shaughnessy, an alumnus of St. Thomas and a donor to the school.

The stadium was renovated in 2017 with the addition of a new field turf surface and track surface. The seating capacity of the stadium is 5,025, though its record attendance was 12,483, achieved on September 14, 2014, during a football game against Saint John's. The most recent addition to the stadium is a new, larger, video board installed in 2023.
