= Pioneer Football League =

Football-only athletic conference

- Association: NCAA
- Founded: 1991; 35 years ago
- Commissioner: Greg Walter (since 2023)
- Sports fielded: 1 (football); men's: 1; women's: 0
- Division: Division I
- Subdivision: FCS
- No. of teams: 11
- Headquarters: St. Louis, Missouri
- Region: Nationwide
- Website: pioneer-football.org

Locations
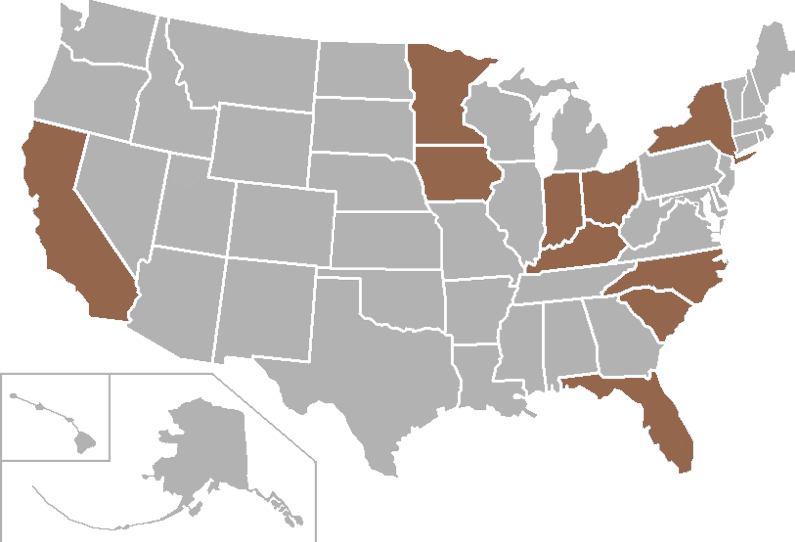

The Pioneer Football League (PFL) is an intercollegiate athletic conference formed in 1991 for the sport of football. Its members compete in the NCAA Division I Football Championship Subdivision (FCS). It has member schools that range from New York, North Carolina, and Florida in the east to California in the west. It is headquartered in St. Louis, Missouri, in the same complex that also contains the offices of the Missouri Valley Conference and Missouri Valley Football Conference. Unlike most other Division I FCS conferences, the Pioneer League consists of institutions that choose not to award athletic scholarships ("grants-in-aid") to football players.

Most of the PFL's members are private schools. Morehead State University is the only public school in the conference.

== History ==
=== 1990s ===
The PFL was created as a direct result of an NCAA rule change passed in January 1991, which required Division I schools to sponsor all of their sports at the Division I level by 1993. Charter members included Butler University, the University of Dayton, Drake University, the University of Evansville, and Valparaiso University. The University of San Diego joined in 1992, and the league played its first season in 1993.

The founding schools came from a variety of football backgrounds. For decades, Drake played the sport at the Division I level in the Missouri Valley Conference before dropping to Division III for the most recent seven seasons (1986 through 1992). Dayton had made the same move much earlier, in 1977, and appeared in the Division III championship game five times, winning the title in 1980 and 1989. San Diego had played Division III football the longest, since the creation of the division in 1973. Evansville's program competed in the National Association for Intercollegiate Athletics (NAIA) from 1988 through 1992 after several years in Division II. Butler and Valparaiso came to the league from the Midwest Intercollegiate Football Conference in Division II. The three Indiana schools had longstanding football rivalries, having played each other annually for decades in the Indiana Collegiate Conference and Heartland Collegiate Conference.

In 1997, the league was reduced to five members when Evansville downgraded football to club status.

=== 2000s ===
In 2001, the conference expanded to nine members and was reorganized into two divisions, with the five existing members forming the North Division and newcomers Austin Peay State University, Davidson College, Jacksonville University and Morehead State University forming the South Division. Austin Peay and Morehead State had been playing scholarship football at the FCS level in the Ohio Valley Conference, which continued to be their all-sports home. Davidson, for decades a member of the Southern Conference, had competed for the past several years as a non-scholarship FCS independent. Jacksonville, a relatively new program, likewise had competed as a non-scholarship FCS independent since its inaugural season in 1998. The reorganization of the PFL brought a new championship system in which the best record holders from each division met in a title game for the conference championship.

On April 8, 2005, Austin Peay announced its departure from the league effective after the 2005 season, to return to scholarship football competition in the Ohio Valley Conference. As a result, the conference reverted to a single table with the champion determined via regular season round-robin play. On April 7, 2006, Campbell University announced the revival of a football program dormant since 1950, and on December 5, 2007, accepted an invitation to the PFL for its inaugural season in 2008. In February 2008, Marist College announced that it would join the PFL for the 2009 season, after its all-sports home, the Metro Atlantic Athletic Conference, stopped sponsoring football. Although Campbell moved in 2011 from the Atlantic Sun Conference to the Big South Conference, which sponsored football, it did not join the Big South in football and remained in the PFL through the 2017 season.

=== 2010s ===
On June 13, 2011, new programs Mercer University and Stetson University were announced as league members effective 2013, expanding the PFL lineup to 12 schools.

Starting in 2013, the league champion received an automatic bid to the FCS playoffs. Soon after its PFL membership was announced, Mercer accepted an invitation to join the Southern Conference effective July 1, 2014. During its one season in the league, Mercer set an FCS record for start-up programs by finishing the 2013 campaign with an overall record of 10–2 including an undefeated 8–0 at home.

The next change in conference membership was announced on November 14, 2016, when Campbell revealed it would transition to scholarship football and add that sport to its existing Big South membership effective with the 2018 season, temporarily reducing the PFL membership to 10. The PFL soon recruited a replacement, as revealed in the November 20, 2017 announcement that Presbyterian College would be joining from the Big South, but not until the 2021 season.

Before Presbyterian began play in the PFL, the league lost a member when Jacksonville, on December 3, 2019, announced that it was discontinuing its football program, effective immediately.

=== 2020s ===
The departure of Jacksonville left the PFL with just nine teams for the 2020 season, which was rescheduled to spring 2021 due to the COVID-19 pandemic. After two PFL members chose not to play football at all during the 2020–21 academic year, the conference entered into a scheduling agreement with Presbyterian that included it in the spring 2021 schedule, in advance of its formal entry into the league in the fall of 2021. While PC was not eligible for the PFL title in that season, it was eligible for the league's individual awards and honors.

Presbyterian was joined as a new PFL member in 2021 by the University of St. Thomas, a Twin Cities school that had been expelled from its longtime Division III home, the Minnesota Intercollegiate Athletic Conference (MIAC), effective in 2021–22. Shortly after the MIAC announced St. Thomas' expulsion, the Summit League, a non-football Division I conference, offered the Tommies membership for the rest of their sports. The NCAA announced on July 15, 2020, that it had granted a waiver to allow St. Thomas to make the jump from D-III to D-I on a five-year schedule, instead of the four years used for moves from Division II. After the NCAA reduced the transition period to four years in January 2025, the Tommies completed the transition that July, making them eligible for the FCS playoffs for the first time in the 2025 season.

== Member schools ==
=== Current members ===
Institution	Location	Founded	Joined	Type	Enrollment	Nickname	Colors	Primary conference when joining the PFL	Current primary conference
Butler University	Indianapolis, Indiana	1855	1991	Private	5,554	Bulldogs		Horizon	Big East
Davidson College	Davidson, North Carolina	1837	2001	Private	1,950	Wildcats		SoCon	Atlantic 10
University of Dayton	Dayton, Ohio	1850	1991	Private	8,353	Flyers		Horizon	Atlantic 10
Drake University	Des Moines, Iowa	1881	1991	Private	3,164	Bulldogs		Missouri Valley	
Marist University	Poughkeepsie, New York	1929	2009	Private	6,200	Red Foxes		Metro	
Morehead State University	Morehead, Kentucky	1922	2001	Public	8,218	Eagles		OVC	
Presbyterian College	Clinton, South Carolina	1880	2021	Private	1,172	Blue Hose		Big South	
University of St. Thomas	St. Paul, Minnesota	1885	2021	Private	6,534	Tommies		Summit	
University of San Diego	San Diego, California	1949	1992	Private	4,904	Toreros		WCC	
Stetson University	DeLand, Florida	1883	2013	Private	4,330	Hatters		ASUN	
Valparaiso University	Valparaiso, Indiana	1859	1991	Private	2,917	Beacons		Summit	Missouri Valley

=== Former members ===
Institution	Location	Founded	Joined	Left	Type	Nickname	Colors	Primary conference when joining the PFL	Current primary conference
Austin Peay State University	Clarksville, Tennessee	1927	2001	2006	Public	Governors		OVC	UAC
Campbell University	Buies Creek, North Carolina	1887	2008	2018	Private	Fighting Camels		ASUN	CAA (Note: Campbell football plays in CAA Football, which the multi-sports CAA administers as a separate entity.)
University of Evansville	Evansville, Indiana	1854	1991	1998 (Note: Evansville dropped football following the 1997–98 school year.)	Private	Purple Aces		Missouri Valley	
Jacksonville University	Jacksonville, Florida	1934	2001	2020 (Note: Jacksonville dropped football following the 2019–20 school year.)	Private	Dolphins		ASUN	
Mercer University	Macon, Georgia	1833	2013	2014	Private	Bears		ASUN	SoCon

=== Membership timeline ===
Full members Other Conference Other Conference

== Rivalries ==
One in-state rivalry currently exists in the PFL. A second had existed before Jacksonville discontinued its football program.

Butler and Valparaiso first met in 1927, and have played every year since 1951. Since 2006, the schools have played for the Hoosier Helmet Trophy. Butler leads the all-time series 56–30. The rivalry extended to all sports when both schools were in the Horizon League from 2007 to 2012.

Jacksonville and Stetson had a football rivalry that ran from 2013, when Stetson began PFL play, to 2019, after which Jacksonville dropped football. The schools have been conference rivals in other sports since 1998, when Jacksonville joined the ASUN Conference, home to Stetson since 1985.

Butler and Dayton also have a rivalry based on proximity to each other. The teams have met every year since 1977 with the exception of 1991, 1992 and 2020. Dayton leads 35–15–1.

== Conference championships ==
Locations of Pioneer Football League schools

=== PFL champions ===
Season	Champion	Record
1993	Dayton	5–0–0
1994	Butler; Dayton	4–1–0
1995	Drake	5–0–0
1996	Dayton	5–0–0
1997	Dayton	5–0–0
1998	Drake	4–0
1999	Dayton	4–0
2000	Dayton; Drake; Valparaiso	3–1
2001	Dayton	Championship Game
2002	Dayton	Championship Game
2003	Valparaiso	Championship Game
2004	Drake	Championship Game
2005	San Diego	Championship Game
2006	San Diego	7–0
2007	Dayton; San Diego	6–1
2008	Jacksonville	7–1
2009	Butler; Dayton	7–1
2010	Jacksonville; Dayton	8–0
2011	San Diego; Drake	7–1
2012	Butler; Drake; San Diego	7–1
2013	Butler; Marist	7–1
2014	San Diego	7–1
2015	Dayton; San Diego	7–1
2016	San Diego	8–0
2017	San Diego	8–0
2018	San Diego	8–0
2019	San Diego	8–0
2020/21*	Davidson	4–1
2021	Davidson; San Diego	7–1
2022	St. Thomas	8–0
2023	Drake	8–0
2024	Drake	7–1
2025	Drake	7–1
2026	Butler; Dayton	7–1

(*) Due to COVID-19, the Pioneer Football League suspended the fall 2020 football season. Dayton and Marist opted out of the spring season. Presbyterian played a full PFL schedule, but was ineligible for the conference title, and its games were not counted in PFL standings.

== League titles by school ==
School	Championships	Championship years
Dayton	13	1993, 1994, 1996, 1997, 1999, 2000, 2001^{*}, 2002^{*}, 2007, 2009, 2010, 2015, 2026
San Diego	12	2005^{*}, 2006, 2007, 2011, 2012, 2014, 2015, 2016, 2017, 2018, 2019, 2021
Drake	9	1995, 1998, 2000, 2004^{*}, 2011, 2012, 2023, 2024, 2025
Butler	5	1994, 2009, 2012, 2013, 2026
Jacksonville	2	2008, 2010
Valparaiso	2	2000, 2003^{*}
Davidson	2	2020×, 2021
Marist	1	2013
St. Thomas	1	2022
Campbell	0	–
Morehead State	0	–
Evansville	0	–
Austin Peay	0	–
Stetson	0	–
Presbyterian	0	–

^{*} – Won in PFL Championship Game
× – played in spring 2021
Italics – Co-champions

== PFL Championship Game ==
Season	North Division	Score	South Division	Location
2001	Dayton	46–14	Jacksonville	Dayton, Ohio
2002	Dayton	28–0	Morehead State	Morehead, Kentucky
2003	Valparaiso	54–42	Morehead State	Valparaiso, Indiana
2004	Drake	20–17	Morehead State	Morehead, Kentucky
2005	San Diego	47–40	Morehead State	San Diego, California

== Postseason games ==
The Pioneer Football League has had alliances with the Gridiron Classic and the Sports Network Cup. In addition, league members are allowed to accept at-large invitations to other college bowl games and teams are eligible to compete in the FCS playoffs.

Through the 2012 season, the NCAA did not offer the league an automatic invite to the FCS playoffs and never offered an at-large bid to any of its teams, effectively barring the league from the tournament. Starting in 2013, the Pioneer League received an automatic bid to compete in the Division I Football Championship as the playoffs expanded from 20 teams to 24. The PFL won its first playoff game in 2016, as San Diego advanced past the first round of the playoffs.

The PFL was a participant in the NCAA Division I FCS Consensus Mid-Major Football National Championship, along with the Northeast Conference and Metro Atlantic Athletic Conference, two other conferences without automatic playoff bids. The Consensus championship has since been discontinued; the NEC first earned an automatic postseason bid in 2010, while the MAAC no longer sponsors football.

=== Members pre-PFL postseason results ===
Below are postseason accomplishments by past and current members prior to the formation of the Pioneer Football League.

Season	Champion		Runner-up		Bowl
1945	Drake	13	Fresno State	12	Raisin Bowl
1946	Evansville	19	Northern Illinois	7	Turkey Bowl
1947	Evansville	20	Northern Illinois	0	Hoosier Bowl
1948	Drake	14	Arizona	13	Salad Bowl
1948	Evansville	13	Missouri Valley	7	Refrigerator Bowl
1949	Evansville	22	Hillsdale	7	Refrigerator Bowl
1950	Wisconsin–La Crosse	47	Valparaiso	14	Cigar Bowl
1951	Houston	26	Dayton	21	Salad Bowl
1957	Louisville	34	Drake	20	Sun Bowl
1960	Middle Tennessee State	21	Presbyterian	12	Tangerine Bowl
1969	Arkansas State	29	Drake	21	Pecan Bowl
1969	Toledo	56	Davidson	33	Tangerine Bowl
1972	Tennessee State	29	Drake	7	Pioneer Bowl
1973	Wittenberg	21	San Diego	14	Division III Playoffs
1974	Central (IA)	31	Evansville	14	Division III Playoffs
1980	Dayton	63	Ithaca	0	Stagg Bowl
1981	Widener	17	Dayton	10	Stagg Bowl
1983	Cal Davis	25	Butler	3	Division II Playoffs
1987	Wagner	19	Dayton	3	Stagg Bowl
1988	Tennessee–Martin	23	Butler	3	Division II Playoffs
1989	Dayton	17	Union (NY)	7	Stagg Bowl
1991	Ithaca	34	Dayton	20	Stagg Bowl
1991	Pittsburg State	26	Butler	16	Division II Playoffs

=== PFL Sports Network Cup results ===
- See Sports Network Cup

=== PFL Gridiron Classic results ===
From 2006 through 2009, the PFL and Northeast Conference (NEC) staged the Gridiron Classic, an exempted postseason football game that matched the champions of the two conferences which were members of Division I FCS, but which were not the recipients of automatic invitations to the football championship playoff at the time.

Season	Champion		Runner-up	
2006	San Diego	27	Monmouth	7
2007	Dayton	42	Albany	21
2008	Albany	28	Jacksonville	0
2009	Butler	28	Central Connecticut	23

=== NCAA Division I Football Championship results ===
Since 2013, the PFL champion has received an invite to the FCS playoffs; previously, PFL teams had to receive an at-large bid, which no team ever received.

Season	PFL Champion	Round	Opponent(s)	Result(s)
2013	Butler	First Round	Tennessee State	L, 0–31
2014	San Diego	First Round	Montana	L, 14–52
2015	Dayton	First Round	Western Illinois	L, 7–24
2016	San Diego	First Round; Second Round	Cal Poly; North Dakota State	W, 35–21; L, 7–45
2017	San Diego	First Round; Second Round	Northern Arizona; North Dakota State	W, 41–10; L, 3–38
2018	San Diego	First Round	Nicholls	L, 30–49
2019	San Diego	First Round	Northern Iowa	L, 3–17
2020–21	Davidson	First Round	Jacksonville State	L, 14–49
2021	Davidson	First Round	Kennesaw State	L, 21–48
2022	Davidson*	First Round	Richmond	L, 0–41
2023	Drake	First Round	North Dakota State	L, 3–66
2024	Drake	First Round	Tarleton State	L, 29–43
2025	Drake	First Round	South Dakota	L, 17–38

* - St. Thomas was the PFL champion in 2022; however, they were ineligible for postseason play due to still being in transition from Division III. Davidson, the runner-up, was awarded the auto-bid in their place.

== Conference facilities ==
School	Football Stadium	Capacity
Butler	Bud and Jackie Sellick Bowl	7,500
Davidson	Davidson College Stadium	5,000
Dayton	Welcome Stadium	11,000
Drake	Drake Stadium	14,557
Marist	Leonidoff Field	5,000
Morehead State	Phil Simms Stadium	10,000
Presbyterian	Bailey Memorial Stadium	6,500
St. Thomas	O'Shaughnessy Stadium	5,025
San Diego	Torero Stadium	6,000
Stetson	Spec Martin Memorial Stadium	6,000
Valparaiso	Brown Field	5,000
