= 2026 Marist Red Foxes football team =

American college football season

2026 Marist Red Foxes football
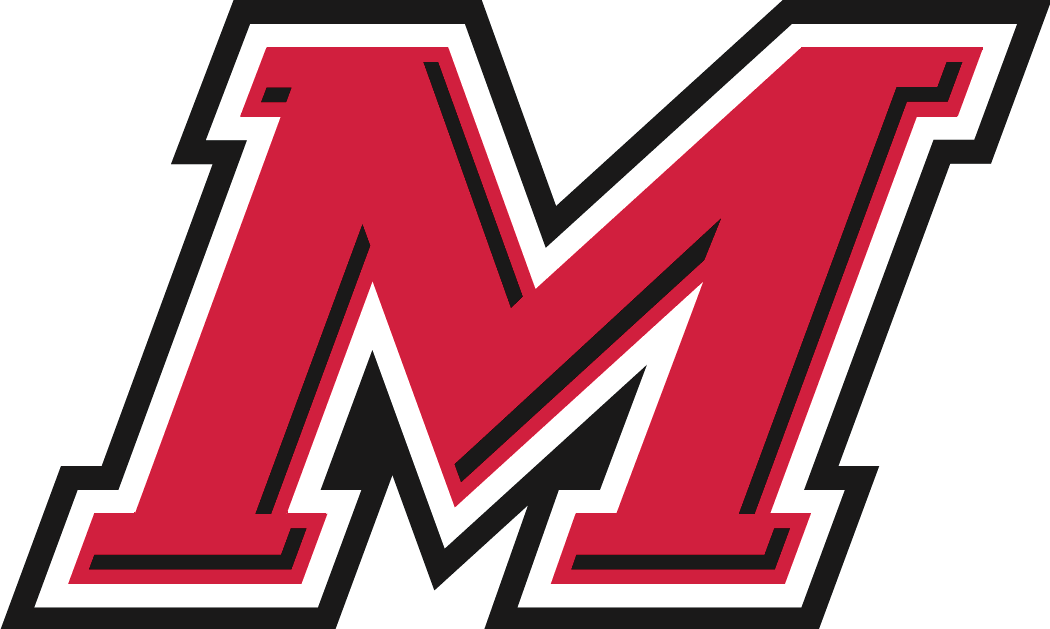
- Conference: Pioneer Football League
- Record: 6–6 (5–3 PFL)
- Head coach: Mike Willis (3rd season)
- Offensive coordinator: TJ Weyl (2nd season)
- Defensive coordinator: Mike Horan (3rd season)
- Home stadium: Tenney Stadium at Leonidoff Field

2026 Pioneer Football League standings
	Conf.			Overall
Team	W		L	W		L
No. 24 Dayton	6	–	1	9	–	1
Butler	6	–	1	9	–	2
St. Thomas (MN)	5	–	2	8	–	3
San Diego	4	–	3	5	–	5
Valparaiso	4	–	3	5	–	5
Marist	4	–	3	5	–	6
Presbyterian	3	–	4	4	–	6
Drake	3	–	5	3	–	8
Davidson	2	–	5	4	–	7
Morehead State	2	–	5	3	–	8
Stetson	0	–	7	1	–	10
As of November 21, 2026; Rankings from STATS Poll

The 2026 Marist Red Foxes football team represent Marist University as a member of the Pioneer Football League (PFL) during the 2026 NCAA Division I FCS football season. Led by third-year head coach Mike Willis, the Red Foxes play their home games at Tenney Stadium at Leonidoff Field in Poughkeepsie, New York.

== Schedule ==
Date	Time	Opponent	Site	TV	Result	Attendance
August 28	6:00 p.m.	at New Haven*	Ralph F. DellaCamera Stadium; West Haven, CT	NEC Front Row	L 21–22	7,030
September 4	7:00 p.m.	Franklin Pierce*	Leonidoff Field; Poughkeepsie, NY	ESPN+	W 27–18	2,863
September 12	12:30 p.m.	at Lafayette*	Fisher Stadium; Easton, PA	ESPN+	L 9–13	
September 26	12:00 p.m.	Presbyterian	Leonidoff Field; Poughkeepsie, NY	ESPN+	W 42–7	1,120
October 3	1:00 p.m.	at Stetson	Spec Martin Stadium; DeLand, FL	YouTube	W 28–14	2,177
October 9	7:00 p.m.	Columbia*	Leonidoff Field; Poughkeepsie, NY	ESPN+	L 28–41	1,141
October 17	1:00 p.m.	at Drake	Drake Stadium; Des Moines, IA	ESPN+	W 27–22	2,639
October 24	12:00 p.m.	St. Thomas (MN)	Leonidoff Field; Poughkeepsie, NY	ESPN+	L 13–35	2,840
October 31	4:00 p.m.	at San Diego	Torero Stadium; San Diego, CA	ESPN+	L 40–41	1,433
November 7	12:00 p.m.	Morehead State	Leonidoff Field; Poughkeepsie, NY	ESPN+	W 14–13	1,837
November 14	12:00 p.m.	Butler	Leonidoff Field; Poughkeepsie, NY	ESPN+	L 0–28	2,167
November 21	1:00 p.m.	at Davidson	Davidson College Stadium; Davidson, NC	ESPN+	W 35–7	
*Non-conference game; All times are in Eastern time

== Game summaries ==
=== at New Haven ===
Marist Red Foxes (0–0) at New Haven Chargers (0–0) – Game summary

Quarter	1	2	3	4	Total
Red Foxes	7	7	7	0	21
Chargers	3	7	9	3	22

at Ralph F. DellaCamera Stadium • West Haven, Connecticut

- Date: August 28
- Game time: 6:00 p.m.
- Game weather: Sunny
- Game attendance: 7,030
- Referee: Dave Stewart
- TV announcers (NEC Front Row): J.W. Stewart and Steve Kunsey

Game information

First quarter

- NH – Liam Quigley 38-yard field goal, 8:57. Chargers 3–0. Drive: 9 plays, 48 yards, 5:12.
- MRST – Sonny Mannino 5-yard run (Luke Stenson kick), 1:54. Red Foxes 7–3. Drive: 9 plays, 70 yards, 3:41.

Second quarter

- MRST – Jordan Caldwell 25-yard interception return (Luke Stenson kick), 13:46. Red Foxes 14–3.
- NH – Isaac Glaudin 39-yard pass from AJ Duffy (Liam Quigley kick), 3:58. Red Foxes 14–10. Drive: 7 plays, 59 yards, 3:12.

Third quarter

- MRST – Zach Garmont 0-yard blocked punt return (Luke Stenson kick), 14:11. Red Foxes 21–10.
- NH – Liam Quigley 35-yard field goal, 10:57. Red Foxes 21–13. Drive: 8 plays, 61 yards, 3:09.
- NH – Nate Burleson II 46-yard pass from AJ Duffy (pass failed), 1:32. Red Foxes 21–19. Drive: 3 plays, 51 yards, 1:15.

Fourth quarter

- NH – Liam Quigley 19-yard field goal, 4:07. Chargers 22–21. Drive: 12 plays, 64 yards, 6:04.

Statistics	MRST	NH
First downs	6	19
Plays–yards	46–160	75–418
Rushes–yards	27–90	37–107
Passing yards	70	311
Passing: comp–att–int	9–19–0	22–38–1
Turnovers	0	1
Time of possession	24:12	35:48

Team	Category	Player	Statistics
Marist	Passing	Sonny Mannino	9/19, 70 yards
Marist	Rushing	Jeremy DeCaro	7 carries, 44 yards
Marist	Receiving	Jayden Taylor	2 receptions, 42 yards
New Haven	Passing	AJ Duffy	22/37, 311 yards, 2 TD, INT
New Haven	Rushing	Zaon Laney	17 carries, 45 yards
New Haven	Receiving	Isaac Glaudin	7 receptions, 99 yards, TD

=== Franklin Pierce (DII) ===
Franklin Pierce Ravens (DII) (0–0) at Marist Red Foxes (0–1) – Game summary

Quarter	1	2	3	4	Total
Ravens (DII)	0	6	0	12	18
Red Foxes	6	7	7	7	27

at Leonidoff Field • Poughkeepsie, New York

- Date: September 4
- Game time: 7:00 p.m.
- Game weather: Sunny
- Game attendance: 2,863
- TV announcers (ESPN+): Geoff Brault, Steve Eggink, and William Rosen

Game information

First quarter

- MRST – Sonny Mannino 45-yard run (Luke Stenson PAT blocked), 4:23. Red Foxes 6–0. Drive: 7 plays, 81 yards, 4:35.

Second quarter

- FP – Adoni Santos 31-yard field goal, 13:35. Red Foxes 6–3. Drive: 10 plays, 61 yards, 5:48.
- MRST – Marco Lainez III 2-yard pass from Sonny Mannino (Luke Stenson kick), 4:23. Red Foxes 13–3. Drive: 17 plays, 72 yards, 8:36.
- FP – Adoni Santos 22-yard field goal, 0:00. Red Foxes 13–6. Drive: 8 plays, 30 yards, 1:05.

Third quarter

- MRST – Lincoln Cardillo 1-yard run (Luke Stenson kick), 9:27. Red Foxes 20–6. Drive: 10 plays, 75 yards, 5:33.

Fourth quarter

- FP – Raj Hillhouse III 28-yard pass from Kevin Leal (Adoni Santos PAT blocked), 9:20. Red Foxes 20–12. Drive: 5 plays, 47 yards, 1:47.
- MRST – Sonny Mannino 26-yard run (Luke Stenson kick), 7:54. Red Foxes 27–12. Drive: 3 plays, 83 yards, 1:25.
- FP – Raj Hillhouse III 5-yard pass from Kevin Leal (pass failed), 9:20. Red Foxes 20–12. Drive: 5 plays, 47 yards, 1:47.

Statistics	FP	MRST
First downs	20	20
Plays–yards	64–270	60–382
Rushes–yards	34–132	35–179
Passing yards	138	203
Passing: comp–att–int	18–30–0	16–25–2
Turnovers	1	2
Time of possession	29:19	30:41

Team	Category	Player	Statistics
Franklin Pierce	Passing	Kevin Leal	10/18, 97 yards, 2 TD
Franklin Pierce	Rushing	Shawn Brown	13 carries, 91 yards
Franklin Pierce	Receiving	Raj Hillhouse	3 receptions, 35 yards, 2 TD
Marist	Passing	Sonny Mannino	16/25, 203 yards, TD, 2 INT
Marist	Rushing	Sonny Mannino	9 carries, 110 yards, 2 TD
Marist	Receiving	Zach Garmont	3 receptions, 64 yards

=== at Lafayette ===
Marist Red Foxes (1–1) at Lafayette Leopards (0–1) – Game summary

Quarter	1	2	3	4	Total
Red Foxes	0	0	0	0	0
Leopards	0	0	0	0	0

at Fisher Stadium • Easton, Pennsylvania

- Date: September 12
- Game time: 12:30 p.m.
- TV: ESPN+

Game information

First quarter
Second quarter
Third quarter
Fourth quarter

Statistics	MRST	LAF
First downs		
Plays–yards		
Rushes–yards		
Passing yards		
Passing: comp–att–int		
Turnovers		
Time of possession		

Team	Category	Player	Statistics
Marist	Passing		
Marist	Rushing		
Marist	Receiving		
Lafayette	Passing		
Lafayette	Rushing		
Lafayette	Receiving		

=== Presbyterian ===
Presbyterian Blue Hose (1–2) at Marist Red Foxes (1–2) – Game summary

Quarter	1	2	3	4	Total
Blue Hose	0	0	0	0	0
Red Foxes	0	0	0	0	0

at Leonidoff Field • Poughkeepsie, New York

- Date: September 26
- Game time: 12:00 p.m.
- TV announcers (ESPN+): Geoff Brault (play-by-play), Steve Eggink (analyst) and William Rosen (sideline)

Game information

First quarter
Second quarter
Third quarter
Fourth quarter

Statistics	PRES	MRST
First downs		
Plays–yards		
Rushes–yards		
Passing yards		
Passing: comp–att–int		
Turnovers		
Time of possession		

Team	Category	Player	Statistics
Presbyterian	Passing		
Presbyterian	Rushing		
Presbyterian	Receiving		
Marist	Passing		
Marist	Rushing		
Marist	Receiving		

=== at Stetson ===
Marist Red Foxes (2–2) at Stetson Hatters (1–3) – Game summary

Quarter	1	2	3	4	Total
Red Foxes	0	0	0	0	0
Hatters	0	0	0	0	0

at Spec Martin Stadium • DeLand, Florida

- Date: October 3
- Game time: 1:00 p.m.

Game information

First quarter
Second quarter
Third quarter
Fourth quarter

Statistics	MRST	STET
First downs		
Plays–yards		
Rushes–yards		
Passing yards		
Passing: comp–att–int		
Turnovers		
Time of possession		

Team	Category	Player	Statistics
Marist	Passing		
Marist	Rushing		
Marist	Receiving		
Stetson	Passing		
Stetson	Rushing		
Stetson	Receiving		

=== Columbia ===
Columbia Lions (2–1) at Marist Red Foxes (3–2) – Game summary

Quarter	1	2	3	4	Total
Lions	7	14	0	20	41
Red Foxes	0	14	7	7	28

at Leonidoff Field • Poughkeepsie, New York

- Date: October 9
- Game time: 7:00 p.m. EDT
- Game weather: Clear • Temperature: 61 °F (16 °C) • Wind: W at 4 miles per hour (6.4 km/h)
- Game attendance: 1,141
- Referee: Jeremy DeAngulo
- TV announcers (ESPN+): Geoff Brault (play-by-play), Steve Eggink (analyst) and William Rosen (sideline)

Game information

First quarter

- COLU – Carter McCray 85-yard blocked field goal return (Hugo Merry kick), 7:50. Lions 7–0.

Second quarter

- MRST – Jayden Taylor 15-yard pass from Sonny Mannino (Luke Stenson kick), 10:23. Tied 7–7. Drive: 6 plays, 58 yards, 3:31.
- MRST – Jeremy Decaro 16-yard run (Luke Stenson kick), 2:42. Red Foxes 14–7. Drive: 6 plays, 58 yards, 4:52.
- COLU – Beckett Robinson 38-yard pass from Chase Goodwin (Hugo Merry kick), 1:02. Tied 14–14. Drive: 7 plays, 89 yards, 1:31.
- COLU – AJ George 44-yard fumble recovery (Hugo Merry kick), 0:33. Lions 21–14.

Third quarter

- MRST – Zach Garmont 55-yard pass from Sonny Mannino (Luke Stenson kick), 12:10. Tied 21–21. Drive: 4 plays, 73 yards, 0:56.

Fourth quarter

- MRST – Sonny Mannino 1-yard run (Luke Stenson kick), 14:18. Red Foxes 28–21. Drive: 9 plays, 66 yards, 4:43.
- COLU – Griffin Johnson 1-yard run, 9:56. Red Foxes 28–27. Drive: 10 plays, 71 yards, 4:16.
- COLU – Hutch Crow 19-yard pass from Chase Goodwin, 8:21. Lions 33–28. Drive: 1 play, 19 yards, 0:07.
- COLU – Safety, 7:32. Lions 35–28.
- COLU – Bryce Coleman 13-yard pass from Chase Goodwin, 2:19. Lions 41–28. Drive: 12 plays, 57 yards, 5:07.

Statistics	COLU	MRST
First downs	22	24
Plays–yards	63–363	70–458
Rushes–yards	31–86	29–121
Passing yards	277	337
Passing: comp–att–int	22–32–1	25–41–0
Turnovers	2	2
Time of possession	27:41	32:19

Team	Category	Player	Statistics
Columbia	Passing	Chase Goodwin	22/32, 277 yards, 3 TD, INT
Columbia	Rushing	Griffin Johnson	19 carries, 98 yards, TD
Columbia	Receiving	Hutch Crow	7 receptions, 105 yards, TD
Marist	Passing	Sonny Mannino	22/34, 321 yards, 2 TD
Marist	Rushing	Isaiah Simmons	17 carries, 76 yards
Marist	Receiving	Reed Shumpert	6 receptions, 105 yards

=== at Drake ===
Marist Red Foxes (3–3) at Drake Bulldogs (2–4) – Game summary

Quarter	1	2	3	4	Total
Red Foxes	0	0	0	0	0
Bulldogs	0	0	0	0	0

at Drake Stadium • Des Moines, Iowa

- Date: October 17
- Game time: 1:00 p.m. EDT

Game information

First quarter
Second quarter
Third quarter
Fourth quarter

Statistics	MRST	DRKE
First downs		
Plays–yards		
Rushes–yards		
Passing yards		
Passing: comp–att–int		
Turnovers		
Time of possession		

Team	Category	Player	Statistics
Marist	Passing		
Marist	Rushing		
Marist	Receiving		
Drake	Passing		
Drake	Rushing		
Drake	Receiving		

=== St. Thomas (MN) ===
St. Thomas Tommies (5–2) at Marist Red Foxes (4–3) – Game summary

Quarter	1	2	3	4	Total
Tommies	0	0	0	0	0
Red Foxes	0	0	0	0	0

at Leonidoff Field • Poughkeepsie, New York

- Date: October 24
- Game time: 12:00 p.m. EDT

Game information

First quarter
Second quarter
Third quarter
Fourth quarter

Statistics	STMN	MRST
First downs		
Plays–yards		
Rushes–yards		
Passing yards		
Passing: comp–att–int		
Turnovers		
Time of possession		

Team	Category	Player	Statistics
St. Thomas (MN)	Passing		
St. Thomas (MN)	Rushing		
St. Thomas (MN)	Receiving		
Marist	Passing		
Marist	Rushing		
Marist	Receiving		

=== at San Diego ===
Marist Red Foxes (4–4) at San Diego Toreros (3–5) – Game summary

Quarter	1	2	3	4	Total
Red Foxes	0	0	0	0	0
Toreros	0	0	0	0	0

at Torero Stadium • San Diego, California

- Date: October 31
- Game time: 4:00 p.m. EDT

Game information

First quarter
Second quarter
Third quarter
Fourth quarter

Statistics	MRST	USD
First downs		
Plays–yards		
Rushes–yards		
Passing yards		
Passing: comp–att–int		
Turnovers		
Time of possession		

Team	Category	Player	Statistics
Marist	Passing		
Marist	Rushing		
Marist	Receiving		
San Diego	Passing		
San Diego	Rushing		
San Diego	Receiving		

=== Morehead State ===
Morehead State Eagles (2–7) at Marist Red Foxes (4–5) – Game summary

Quarter	1	2	3	4	Total
Eagles	0	0	0	0	0
Red Foxes	0	0	0	0	0

at Leonidoff Field • Poughkeepsie, New York

- Date: November 7
- Game time: 12:00 p.m. EST

Statistics	MORE	MRST
First downs		
Plays–yards		
Rushes–yards		
Passing yards		
Passing: comp–att–int		
Time of possession		

Team	Category	Player	Statistics
Morehead State	Passing		
Morehead State	Rushing		
Morehead State	Receiving		
Marist	Passing		
Marist	Rushing		
Marist	Receiving		

=== Butler ===
Butler Bulldogs (8–2) at Marist Red Foxes (5–5) – Game summary

Quarter	1	2	3	4	Total
Bulldogs	0	7	7	14	28
Red Foxes	0	0	0	0	0

at Leonidoff Field • Poughkeepsie, New York

- Date: November 14
- Game time: 12:00 p.m.
- Game weather: Cloudy • Temperature: 45 °F (7 °C) • Wind: NW at 9 miles per hour (14 km/h)
- Game attendance: 2,167
- Referee: Rob Cibotti
- TV announcers (ESPN+): Geoff Brault (play-by-play), Steve Eggink (analyst) and William Rosen (sideline)

Game information

First quarter

No scoring plays

Second quarter

- (14:56) BUT – Michael Dellumo 6-yard run, Beck Janki kick (Drive: 8 plays, 61 yards, 4:52; Butler 7–0)

Third quarter

- (8:49) BUT – Michael Dellumo 3-yard run, Beck Janki kick (Drive: 3 plays, 13 yards, 1:32; Butler 14–0)

Fourth quarter

- (11:45) BUT – Gabe Passini 1-yard run, Beck Janki kick (Drive: 11 plays, 56 yards, 5:44; Butler 21–0)
- (10:13) BUT – Desmin Jackson 6-yard run, Beck Janki kick (Drive: 1 play, 6 yards, 0:08; Butler 28–0)

Statistics	BUT	MRST
First downs	13	11
Plays–yards	57–233	62–193
Rushes–yards	39–123	26–52
Passing yards	110	141
Passing: comp–att–int	12–18–0	19–36–2
Turnovers	0	2
Time of possession	28:50	31:10

Team	Category	Player	Statistics
Butler	Passing	Gabe Passini	10/16, 101 yards
Butler	Rushing	Gabe Passini	14 carries, 64 yards, TD
Butler	Receiving	Nick Munson	4 receptions, 46 yards
Marist	Passing	Sonny Mannino	18/32, 138 yards, 2 INT
Marist	Rushing	Isaiah Simmons	10 carries, 36 yards
Marist	Receiving	Reed Shumpert	3 receptions, 48 yards

=== at Davidson ===
Marist Red Foxes (5–6) at Davidson Wildcats (4–7) – Game summary

Quarter	1	2	3	4	Total
Red Foxes	0	0	0	0	0
Wildcats	0	0	0	0	0

at Davidson College Stadium • Davidson, North Carolina

- Date: November 21
- Game time: 1:00 p.m. EDT

Game information

First quarter
Second quarter
Third quarter
Fourth quarter

Statistics	MRST	DAV
First downs		
Plays–yards		
Rushes–yards		
Passing yards		
Passing: comp–att–int		
Turnovers		
Time of possession		

Team	Category	Player	Statistics
Marist	Passing		
Marist	Rushing		
Marist	Receiving		
Davidson	Passing		
Davidson	Rushing		
Davidson	Receiving		
