= Kevin Lynch (American football) =

American football player and coach

Current position
- Title: Head coach
- Team: Butler
- Conference: PFL
- Record: 16–8

Playing career
- 2005–2008: Franklin (IN)
- Position: Wide receiver

Coaching career (HC unless noted)
- 2009: Indiana (OQC)
- 2010–2015: Indianapolis (WR/RC)
- 2016–2017: Ball State (RB)
- 2018–2019: Ball State (RB/RC)
- 2020: Ball State (OC/RB)
- 2021–2023: Ball State (OC/QB)
- 2024: Ball State (AHC/OC/QB)
- 2025–present: Butler

Head coaching record
- Overall: 16–8

Accomplishments and honors

Championships
- 1 PFL (2026)

Kevin Lynch is an American football coach and former player who is the current head coach of the Butler Bulldogs. He played college football for the Franklin Grizzlies and has previously coached for the Indiana Hoosiers, Indianapolis Greyhounds and Ball State Cardinals.

== Early life ==
Lynch is a son of Bill Lynch, who was a head college football coach for the Butler Bulldogs, Ball State Cardinals, Indiana Hoosiers and DePauw Tigers, as well as a brother of coach Joey Lynch. He attended Franklin College where he played football for the Franklin Grizzlies, being an All-Heartland Collegiate Athletic Conference (HCAC) wide receiver in three years as a starter. He helped the team win the HCAC title in 2007 and 2008 and he totaled 52 receptions for 612 yards and eight touchdowns as a senior, helping the Grizzlies advance to the NCAA Division III Elite Eight. He graduated from Franklin in 2009 with a bachelor's degree.

== Coaching career ==
Lynch interned with the Indianapolis Greyhounds football team in spring 2009, prior to his graduation from Franklin, working as the wide receivers coach for spring practices. Later that year, he became the offensive quality control coach for the Indiana Hoosiers, a team that his father was head coach of at the time. In 2010, when he was age 23, he was hired by the Indianapolis Greyhounds as wide receivers coach and recruiting coordinator. He served in that position for six years and helped the team achieve 39 wins, four conference championships and three Division II playoff appearances over a four-year span.

Lynch rose to the NCAA Division I ranks in 2016, being named the running backs coach for the Ball State Cardinals. He was the running backs coach and recruiting coordinator from 2018 to 2019, helping develop future NFL running back Caleb Huntley. In 2020, he was promoted to offensive coordinator while retaining his running backs coach role, succeeding his brother Joey in the position. He switched from coaching the running backs to being quarterbacks coach in 2021. He also added the position of assistant head coach in 2024.

In December 2024, Lynch was announced as the new head coach for the Butler Bulldogs.

== Personal life ==
Lynch is married and has four children.

== Head coaching record ==
| Year | Team | Overall | Conference | Standing | Bowl/playoffs |
|---|---|---|---|---|---|
Butler Bulldogs (Pioneer Football League) (2025–present)
| 2025 | Butler | 6–6 | 4–4 | T–6th | |
| 2026 | Butler | 10–2 | 7–1 | T–1st | |
| Butler: | | 16–8 | 11–5 | | |
| Total: | | 16–8 | | | |
