= 2026 Davidson Wildcats football team =

American college football season

2026 Davidson Wildcats football
- Conference: Pioneer Football League
- Record: 4–8 (2–6 PFL)
- Head coach: Saj Thakkar (2nd season)
- Offensive coordinator: Keegan Kennedy (2nd season)
- Defensive coordinator: Woody Blevins (1st season)
- Home stadium: Davidson College Stadium

2026 Pioneer Football League standings
	Conf.			Overall
Team	W		L	W		L
No. 24 Dayton	6	–	1	9	–	1
Butler	6	–	1	9	–	2
St. Thomas (MN)	5	–	2	8	–	3
San Diego	4	–	3	5	–	5
Valparaiso	4	–	3	5	–	5
Marist	4	–	3	5	–	6
Presbyterian	3	–	4	4	–	6
Drake	3	–	5	3	–	8
Davidson	2	–	5	4	–	7
Morehead State	2	–	5	3	–	8
Stetson	0	–	7	1	–	10
As of November 21, 2026; Rankings from STATS Poll

The 2026 Davidson Wildcats football team represent Davidson College as a member of the Pioneer Football League (PFL) during the 2026 NCAA Division I FCS football season. The Wildcats are led by second-year head coach Saj Thakkar and play their home games at Davidson College Stadium located in Davidson, North Carolina.

== Schedule ==
Date	Time	Opponent	Site	TV	Result	Attendance
August 27	7:00 p.m.	Concord*	Davidson College Stadium; Davidson, NC	ESPN+	L 35–41	2,346
September 5	6:00 p.m.	Elon*	Davidson College Stadium; Davidson, NC	ESPN+	L 0–38	2,554
September 12	12:00 p.m.	Dickinson*	Davidson College Stadium; Davidson, NC	ESPN+	W 28–14	1,813
September 19	1:00 p.m.	VMI*	Davidson College Stadium; Davidson, NC	ESPN+	W 27–24 ^{OT}	1,952
September 26	6:00 p.m.	Drake	Davidson College Stadium; Davidson, NC	ESPN+	L 32–51	1,954
October 3	4:00 p.m.	at San Diego	Torero Stadium; San Diego, CA	ESPN+	L 14–63	1,724
October 10	4:00 p.m.	at Presbyterian	Bailey Memorial Stadium; Clinton, SC	ESPN+	L 21–38	1,341
October 17	1:00 p.m.	Morehead State^{†}	Davidson College Stadium; Davidson, NC	ESPN+	W 34–31 ^{OT}	
October 31	2:00 p.m.	at St. Thomas (MN)	O'Shaughnessy Stadium; Saint Paul, MN	ESPN+	L 7–35	1,704
November 7	1:00 p.m.	Stetson	Davidson College Stadium; Davidson, NC	ESPN+	W 33–14	2,268
November 14	12:00 p.m.	at Dayton	Welcome Stadium; Dayton, OH	ESPN+	L 3–34	3,275
November 21	1:00 p.m.	Marist	Davidson College Stadium; Davidson, NC	ESPN+	L 7–35	
*Non-conference game; ^{†}Homecoming; All times are in Eastern time

== Game summaries ==
=== Concord (DII) ===
Concord Mountain Lions (DII) (0–0) at Davidson Wildcats (0–0) – Game summary

Quarter	1	2	3	4	Total
Mountain Lions (DII)	7	21	10	3	41
Wildcats	7	21	0	7	35

at Davidson College Stadium • Davidson, North Carolina

- Date: August 27
- Game time: 7:00 p.m.
- Game weather: Cloudy • Temperature: 82 °F (28 °C)
- Game attendance: 2,346
- Referee: Jake Grombach
- TV: ESPN+

Game information

First quarter

- DAV – Hudson Altenburg 0-yard blocked punt return (Christos Tzoumakas kick), 8:18. Wildcats 7–0.
- CON – Greg Burrell 37-yard run (Christian Torres kick), 4:55. Tied 7–7. Drive: 9 plays, 72 yards, 3:17.

Second quarter

- DAV – Jack Perozek 3-yard pass from Casey Bullock (Christos Tzoumakas kick), 12:40. Wildcats 14–7. Drive: 17 plays, 85 yards, 7:09.
- CON – Dom Collins 53-yard pass from Devin Kargman (Christian Torres kick), 12:03. Tied 14–14. Drive: 2 plays, 60 yards, 0:31.
- DAV – Jacary Lightsey 9-yard pass from Casey Bullock (Christos Tzoumakas kick), 7:06. Wildcats 21–14. Drive: 9 plays, 59 yards, 4:47.
- CON – Dom Collins 68-yard run (Christian Torres kick failed), 6:32. Wildcats 21–20. Drive: 2 plays, 74 yards, 0:28.
- CON – Jayden Williams 2-yard run (Devin Kargman–Dom Collins pass), 5:19. Mountain Lions 28–21. Drive: 4 plays, 11 yards, 0:54.
- DAV – Alani Ajigbotosho 11-yard pass from Casey Bullock (Christos Tzoumakas kick), 0:53. Tied 28–28. Drive: 14 plays, 65 yards, 4:26.

Third quarter

- CON – Stanley Horn Jr. 33-yard interception return (Christian Torres kick), 13:59. Mountain Lions 35–28.
- CON – Christian Torres 26-yard field goal, 4:28. Mountain Lions 38–28. Drive: 10 plays, 80 yards, 3:23.

Fourth quarter

- CON – Christian Torres 23-yard field goal, 10:29. Mountain Lions 41–28. Drive: 14 plays, 85 yards, 6:26.
- DAV – Casey Bullock 17-yard run (Christos Tzoumakas kick), 7:00. Mountain Lions 41–35. Drive: 9 plays, 75 yards, 3:29.

Statistics	CON	DAV
First downs	17	26
Plays–yards	61–477	88–343
Rushes–yards	27–252	33–100
Passing yards	225	243
Passing: comp–att–int	17–34–0	30–55–1
Turnovers	0	2
Time of possession	23:35	36:25

Team	Category	Player	Statistics
Concord	Passing	Devin Kargman	17/34, 225 yards, TD
Concord	Rushing	Greg Burrell	11 carries, 87 yards, TD
Concord	Receiving	Dom Collins	3 receptions, 75 yards, TD
Davidson	Passing	Casey Bullock	29/54, 241 yards, 3 TD, INT
Davidson	Rushing	Casey Bullock	14 carries, 81 yards, TD
Davidson	Receiving	Jacary Lightsey	10 receptions, 65 yards, TD

=== Elon ===
Elon Phoenix (1–0) at Davidson Wildcats (0–1) – Game summary

Quarter	1	2	3	4	Total
Phoenix	3	21	7	7	38
Wildcats	0	0	0	0	0

at Davidson College Stadium • Davidson, North Carolina

- Date: September 5
- Game time: 6:00 p.m.
- Game weather: Sunny • Temperature: 87 °F (31 °C)
- Game attendance: 2,554
- Referee: Jeff Page
- TV announcers (ESPN+): Jon Gross (play-by-play), and Mark Covert (analyst)

Game information

First quarter

- ELON – Luke Barnes 39-yard field goal, 12:15. Phoenix 3–0. Drive: 4 plays, 3 yards, 1:16.

Second quarter

- ELON – Kamerin McDowell-Moore 29-yard run (Luke Barnes kick), 11:37. Phoenix 10–0. Drive: 3 plays, 50 yards, 0:55.
- ELON – Jimmyll Williams 3-yard run (Luke Barnes kick), 9:26. Phoenix 17–0. Drive: 2 plays, 7 yards, 0:36.
- ELON – Jimmyll Williams 1-yard run (Luke Barnes kick), 11:37. Phoenix 24–0. Drive: 8 plays, 74 yards, 4:17.

Third quarter

- ELON – Jaedon Alford 36-yard pass from TJ Crews IV (Luke Barnes kick), 10:25. Phoenix 31–0. Drive: 5 plays, 77 yards, 2:26.

Fourth quarter

- ELON – Kamerin McDowell-Moore 1-yard run (Luke Barnes kick), 8:27. Phoenix 38–0. Drive: 9 plays, 57 yards, 5:09.

Statistics	ELON	DAV
First downs	17	11
Plays–yards	63–345	62–251
Rushes–yards	41–154	23–49
Passing yards	191	202
Passing: comp–att–int	12–22–0	17–39–0
Turnovers	0	0
Time of possession	30:42	29:18

Team	Category	Player	Statistics
Elon	Passing	TJ Crews IV	5/7, 108 yards, TD
Elon	Rushing	Kamerin McDowell-Moore	15 carries, 88 yards, 2 TD
Elon	Receiving	Jaedon Alford	2 receptions, 70 yards, TD
Davidson	Passing	Casey Bullock	13/32, 174 yards
Davidson	Rushing	Christos Tzoumakas	1 carry, 25 yards
Davidson	Receiving	Jacary Lightsey	3 receptions, 72 yards

=== Dickinson (DIII) ===
Dickinson Red Devils (DIII) (1–0) at Davidson Wildcats (0–2) – Game summary

Quarter	1	2	3	4	Total
Red Devils (DIII)	0	7	7	0	14
Wildcats	7	7	0	14	28

at Davidson College Stadium • Davidson, North Carolina

- Date: September 12
- Game time: 12:00 p.m.
- Game weather: Clear • Temperature: 81 °F (27 °C)
- Game attendance: 1,813
- Referee: Bruce Austin
- TV: ESPN+

Game information

First quarter

- (7:56) DAV – Brodey Berg 1-yard run, Christos Tzoumakas kick (Drive: 5 plays, 64 yards, 2:10; Davidson 7–0)

Second quarter

- (7:11) DCK – Jimmy Mulholland 42-yard interception, Hudson Reese kick (Tied 7–7)
- (1:54) DAV – Andrew Frazier 8-yard run, Christos Tzoumakas kick (Drive: 11 plays, 68 yards, 5:17; Davidson 14–7)

Third quarter

- (13:56) DCK – Dane Sorensen 83-yard run, Hudson Reese kick (Drive: 3 plays, 74 yards, 0:58; Tied 14–14)

Fourth quarter

- (14:54) DAV – Will Jones 5-yard run, Christos Tzoumakas kick (Drive: 16 plays, 89 yards, 8:11; Davidson 21–14)
- (6:19) DAV – Casey Bullock 6-yard run, Christos Tzoumakas kick (Drive: 8 plays, 74 yards, 6:05; Davidson 28–14)

Statistics	DCK	DAV
First downs	12	25
Plays–yards	62–265	79–453
Rushes–yards	27–125	38–160
Passing yards	140	293
Passing: comp–att–int	18–35–0	29–41–2
Turnovers	0	2
Time of possession	21:16	38:44

Team	Category	Player	Statistics
Dickinson	Passing	Ben Klassen	18/35, 140 yards
Dickinson	Rushing	Dane Sorensen	4 carries, 94 yards, TD
Dickinson	Receiving	Frederik Fjeldseth	6 receptions, 75 yards
Davidson	Passing	Casey Bullock	29/41, 293 yards, 2 INT
Davidson	Rushing	Will Jones	14 carries, 77 yards, TD
Davidson	Receiving	AJ Adams	6 receptions, 109 yards

=== VMI ===
VMI Keydets (0–3) at Davidson Wildcats (1–2) – Game summary

Quarter	1	2	3	4	Total
Keydets	0	0	0	0	0
Wildcats	0	0	0	0	0

at Davidson College Stadium • Davidson, North Carolina

- Date: September 19
- Game time: 1:00 p.m.

Game information

First quarter
Second quarter
Third quarter
Fourth quarter

Statistics	VMI	DAV
First downs		
Plays–yards		
Rushes–yards		
Passing yards		
Passing: comp–att–int		
Turnovers		
Time of possession		

Team	Category	Player	Statistics
VMI	Passing		
VMI	Rushing		
VMI	Receiving		
Davidson	Passing		
Davidson	Rushing		
Davidson	Receiving		

=== Drake ===
Drake Bulldogs (0–3) at Davidson Wildcats (2–2) – Game summary

Quarter	1	2	3	4	Total
Bulldogs	0	0	0	0	0
Wildcats	0	0	0	0	0

at Davidson College Stadium • Davidson, North Carolina

- Date: September 26
- Game time: 6:00 p.m.
- TV: ESPN+

Game information

First quarter
Second quarter
Third quarter
Fourth quarter

Statistics	DRKE	DAV
First downs		
Plays–yards		
Rushes–yards		
Passing yards		
Passing: comp–att–int		
Turnovers		
Time of possession		

Team	Category	Player	Statistics
Drake	Passing		
Drake	Rushing		
Drake	Receiving		
Davidson	Passing		
Davidson	Rushing		
Davidson	Receiving		

=== at San Diego ===
Davidson Wildcats (2–3) at San Diego Toreros (1–3) – Game summary

Quarter	1	2	3	4	Total
Wildcats	0	0	0	0	0
Toreros	0	0	0	0	0

at Torero Stadium • San Diego, California

- Date: October 3
- Game time: 4:00 p.m. EDT

Game information

First quarter
Second quarter
Third quarter
Fourth quarter

Statistics	DAV	USD
First downs		
Plays–yards		
Rushes–yards		
Passing yards		
Passing: comp–att–int		
Turnovers		
Time of possession		

Team	Category	Player	Statistics
Davidson	Passing		
Davidson	Rushing		
Davidson	Receiving		
San Diego	Passing		
San Diego	Rushing		
San Diego	Receiving		

=== at Presbyterian ===
Davidson Wildcats (2–4) at Presbyterian Blue Hose (2–3) – Game summary

Quarter	1	2	3	4	Total
Wildcats	0	0	0	0	0
Blue Hose	0	0	0	0	0

at Bailey Memorial Stadium • Clinton, South Carolina

- Date: October 10
- Game time: 5:30 p.m.

Game information

First quarter
Second quarter
Third quarter
Fourth quarter

Statistics	DAV	PRES
First downs		
Plays–yards		
Rushes–yards		
Passing yards		
Passing: comp–att–int		
Turnovers		
Time of possession		

Team	Category	Player	Statistics
Davidson	Passing		
Davidson	Rushing		
Davidson	Receiving		
Presbyterian	Passing		
Presbyterian	Rushing		
Presbyterian	Receiving		

=== Morehead State ===
Morehead State Eagles (1–5) at Davidson Wildcats (2–5) – Game summary

Quarter	1	2	3	4	Total
Eagles	0	0	0	0	0
Wildcats	0	0	0	0	0

at Davidson College Stadium • Davidson, North Carolina

- Date: October 17
- Game time: 1:00 p.m.

Game information

First quarter
Second quarter
Third quarter
Fourth quarter

Statistics	MORE	DAV
First downs		
Plays–yards		
Rushes–yards		
Passing yards		
Passing: comp–att–int		
Turnovers		
Time of possession		

Team	Category	Player	Statistics
Morehead State	Passing		
Morehead State	Rushing		
Morehead State	Receiving		
Davidson	Passing		
Davidson	Rushing		
Davidson	Receiving		

=== at St. Thomas (MN) ===
Davidson Wildcats (3–5) at St. Thomas Tommies (6–2) – Game summary

Quarter	1	2	3	4	Total
Wildcats	0	0	0	0	0
Tommies	0	0	0	0	0

at O'Shaughnessy Stadium • Saint Paul, Minnesota

- Date: October 31
- Game time: 2:00 p.m.

Game information

First quarter
Second quarter
Third quarter
Fourth quarter

Statistics	DAV	STMN
First downs		
Plays–yards		
Rushes–yards		
Passing yards		
Passing: comp–att–int		
Turnovers		
Time of possession		

Team	Category	Player	Statistics
Davidson	Passing		
Davidson	Rushing		
Davidson	Receiving		
St. Thomas (MN)	Passing		
St. Thomas (MN)	Rushing		
St. Thomas (MN)	Receiving		

=== Stetson ===
Stetson Hatters (1–8) at Davidson Wildcats (3–6) – Game summary

Quarter	1	2	3	4	Total
Hatters	0	0	0	0	0
Wildcats	0	0	0	0	0

at Davidson College Stadium • Davidson, North Carolina

- Date: November 7
- Game time: 1:00 p.m.

Game information

First quarter
Second quarter
Third quarter
Fourth quarter

Statistics	STET	DAV
First downs		
Plays–yards		
Rushes–yards		
Passing yards		
Passing: comp–att–int		
Turnovers		
Time of possession		

Team	Category	Player	Statistics
Stetson	Passing		
Stetson	Rushing		
Stetson	Receiving		
Davidson	Passing		
Davidson	Rushing		
Davidson	Receiving		

=== at Dayton ===
Davidson Wildcats (4–6) at Dayton Flyers (8–1) – Game summary

Quarter	1	2	3	4	Total
Wildcats	0	0	0	0	0
Flyers	0	0	0	0	0

at Welcome Stadium • Dayton, Ohio

- Date: November 14
- Game time: 12:00 p.m.

Game information

First quarter
Second quarter
Third quarter
Fourth quarter

Statistics	DAV	DAY
First downs		
Plays–yards		
Rushes–yards		
Passing yards		
Passing: comp–att–int		
Turnovers		
Time of possession		

Team	Category	Player	Statistics
Davidson	Passing		
Davidson	Rushing		
Davidson	Receiving		
Dayton	Passing		
Dayton	Rushing		
Dayton	Receiving		

=== Marist ===
Marist Red Foxes (5–6) at Davidson Wildcats (4–7) – Game summary

Quarter	1	2	3	4	Total
Red Foxes	0	0	0	0	0
Wildcats	0	0	0	0	0

at Davidson College Stadium • Davidson, North Carolina

- Date: November 21
- Game time: 1:00 p.m.

Game information

First quarter
Second quarter
Third quarter
Fourth quarter

Statistics	MRST	DAV
First downs		
Plays–yards		
Rushes–yards		
Passing yards		
Passing: comp–att–int		
Turnovers		
Time of possession		

Team	Category	Player	Statistics
Marist	Passing		
Marist	Rushing		
Marist	Receiving		
Davidson	Passing		
Davidson	Rushing		
Davidson	Receiving		
