= 2026 San Diego Toreros football team =

American college football season

2026 San Diego Toreros football
- Conference: Pioneer Football League
- Record: 6–5 (5–3 PFL)
- Head coach: Brandon Moore (4th season)
- Offensive coordinator: Nick Fulton (2nd season)
- Defensive coordinator: Isaac Carter (4th season)
- Co-defensive coordinator: Mike McGlinchey Jr. (4th season)
- Home stadium: Torero Stadium

2026 Pioneer Football League standings
	Conf.			Overall
Team	W		L	W		L
No. 24 Dayton +^	7	–	1	10	–	1
Butler +	7	–	1	10	–	2
St. Thomas (MN)	6	–	2	9	–	3
San Diego	5	–	3	6	–	5
Marist	5	–	3	6	–	6
Valparaiso	4	–	4	5	–	6
Presbyterian	3	–	5	4	–	7
Drake	3	–	5	3	–	8
Davidson	2	–	6	4	–	8
Morehead State	2	–	6	3	–	9
Stetson	0	–	8	1	–	11
+ – Conference co-champions; ^ – FCS playoff participant; As of November 22, 2026; Rankings from STATS Poll

The 2026 San Diego Toreros football team represents the University of San Diego as a member of the Pioneer Football League (PFL) during the 2026 NCAA Division I FCS football season. The Toreros are led by fourth-year head coach Brandon Moore and play their home games at Torero Stadium in San Diego, CA.

== Schedule ==
Date	Time	Opponent	Site	TV	Result	Attendance
September 5	7:00 p.m.	No. 7 UC Davis*	Torero Stadium; San Diego, CA	ESPN+	L 17–49	4,573
September 12	3:00 p.m.	at No. 17 Idaho State*	ICCU Dome; Pocatello, ID	ESPN+	L 17–59	6,574
September 19	5:00 p.m.	at Cal Poly*	Mustang Memorial Field; San Luis Obispo, CA	ESPN+	W 38–35	10,259
September 26	11:00 a.m.	at St. Thomas (MN)	O'Shaughnessy Stadium; Saint Paul, MN	Midco Sports Plus	L 17–50	3,866
October 3	1:00 p.m.	Davidson	Torero Stadium; San Diego, CA	ESPN+	W 63–14	1,724
October 10	10:00 a.m.	at Butler	Bud and Jackie Sellick Bowl; Indianapolis, IN	ESPN+	L 10–41	3,909
October 17	1:00 p.m.	Valparaiso^{†}	Torero Stadium; San Diego, CA	ESPN+	W 38–13	3,817
October 24	9:00 a.m.	at Dayton	Welcome Stadium; Dayton, OH	YouTube	L 32–37	3,645
October 31	1:00 p.m.	Marist	Torero Stadium; San Diego, CA	ESPN+	W 41–40	1,433
November 7	10:00 a.m.	at Drake	Drake Stadium; Des Moines, IA	ESPN+	W 40–17	2,574
November 21	5:00 p.m.	Stetson	Torero Stadium; San Diego, CA	ESPN+	W 59–21	
*Non-conference game; ^{†}Homecoming; Rankings from STATS Poll released prior to the game; All times are in Eastern time

== Game summaries ==
=== No. 7 UC Davis ===
No. 7 UC Davis Aggies (1–0) at San Diego Toreros (0–0) – Game summary

Quarter	1	2	3	4	Total
No. 7 Aggies	0	28	14	7	49
Toreros	7	0	7	3	17

at Torero Stadium • San Diego, California

- Date: September 5
- Game time: 7:00 p.m.
- Game weather: Sunny • Temperature: 83 °F (28 °C) • Wind: NE at 3 miles per hour (4.8 km/h)
- Game attendance: 4,573
- Referee: Jason Nickelby
- TV announcers (ESPN+): Jack Cronin and George Whitfield Jr.

Game information

First quarter

- USD – Omar Mbakwe 2-yard run (Emiliano Salazar kick), 3:24. Toreros 7–0. Drive: 11 plays, 68 yards, 6:23.

Second quarter

- UCD – Samuel Gbatu Jr. 10-yard pass from Treynor Cleeland (Robert Meyer kick), 14:57. Tied 7–7. Drive: 2 plays, 32 yards, 0:23.
- UCD – Jordan Fisher 1-yard run (Robert Meyer kick), 10:26. Aggies 14–7. Drive: 3 plays, 31 yards, 0:37.
- UCD – Edward Khutsishvili 13-yard pass from Treynor Cleeland (Robert Meyer kick), 10:04. Aggies 21–7. Drive: 1 plays, 13 yards, 0:12.
- UCD – Jordan Fisher 31-yard pass from Treynor Cleeland (Robert Meyer kick), 1:53. Aggies 28–7. Drive: 2 plays, 55 yards, 0:13.

Third quarter

- UCD – Tyler Hennessy 5-yard pass from Treynor Cleeland (Robert Meyer kick), 9:57. Aggies 35–7. Drive: 8 plays, 96 yards, 3:24.
- UCD – Matteo Perez 79-yard run (Robert Meyer kick), 7:11. Aggies 42–7. Drive: 4 plays, 90 yards, 1:12.
- USD – Cole Monach 22-yard pass from Dom Nankil (Emiliano Salazar kick), 5:03. Aggies 42–14. Drive: 5 plays, 75 yards, 2:08.

Fourth quarter

- USD – Emiliano Salazar 34-yard field goal, 13:59. Aggies 42–17. Drive: 8 plays, 49 yards, 3:14.
- UCD – Samuel Gbatu Jr. 8-yard pass from Treynor Cleeland (Robert Meyer kick), 14:57. Aggies 49–17. Drive: 12 plays, 75 yards, 6:29.

Statistics	UCD	USD
First downs	25	16
Plays–yards	67–537	67–328
Rushes–yards	34–231	35–146
Passing yards	306	182
Passing: comp–att–int	24–33–1	17–32–2
Turnovers	1	2
Time of possession	29:47	30:08

Team	Category	Player	Statistics
UC Davis	Passing	Treynor Cleeland	22/31, 294 yards, 5 TD, INT
UC Davis	Rushing	Matteo Perez	9 carries, 123 yards, TD
UC Davis	Receiving	Samuel Gbatu Jr.	9 receptions, 129 yards, 2 TD
San Diego	Passing	Dom Nankil	16/31, 177 yards, TD, 2 INT
San Diego	Rushing	Adam Criter	14 carries, 54 yards
San Diego	Receiving	Cole Monach	6 receptions, 72 yards, TD

=== at No. 17 Idaho State ===
San Diego Toreros (0–1) at No. 17 Idaho State Bengals (2–0) – Game summary

Quarter	1	2	3	4	Total
Toreros	0	10	0	7	17
No. 17 Bengals	21	3	14	21	59

at ICCU Dome • Pocatello, Idaho

- Date: September 12
- Game time: 3:00 p.m. PDT
- Game weather: none (played indoors)
- Game attendance: 6,574
- Referee: Justin Robinson
- TV announcers (ESPN+): Scott Gross and Mitch Beckstead

Game information

First quarter

- IDST – Davis Harsin 4-yard run (Mason Lindberg kick), 10:22. Bengals 7–0. Drive: 5 plays, 56 yards, 2:06.
- IDST – Carson Sudbury 8-yard pass from Jordan Cooke (Mason Lindberg kick), 6:32. Bengals 14–0. Drive: 8 plays, 43 yards, 3:08.
- IDST – Chedon James 74-yard pass from Jordan Cooke (Mason Lindberg kick), 4:04. Bengals 21–0. Drive: 1 plays, 74 yards, 0:11.

Second quarter

- USD – Dom Nankil 7-yard run (Emiliano Salazar kick), 10:59. Bengals 21–7. Drive: 9 plays, 61 yards, 4:01.
- USD – Emiliano Salazar 37-yard field goal, 2:57. Bengals 21–10. Drive: 10 plays, 45 yards, 4:09.
- IDST – Mason Lindberg 42-yard field goal, 0:44. Bengals 24–10. Drive: 7 plays, 50 yards, 2:05.

Third quarter

- IDST – Collin Lewis 28-yard interception return (Mason Lindberg kick), 10:13. Bengals 31–10.
- IDST – Tytan Mason 21-yard run (Mason Lindberg kick), 6:56. Bengals 38–10. Drive: 4 plays, 67 yards, 1:47.

Fourth quarter

- IDST – Zedekiah Anahu-Ambrosio 79-yard pass from Jordan Cooke (Mason Lindberg kick), 14:12. Bengals 45–10. Drive: 2 plays, 93 yards, 0:42.
- USD – CJ Ceron 53-yard run (Emiliano Salazar kick), 12:28. Bengals 45–17. Drive: 3 plays, 73 yards, 1:38.
- IDST – Zedekiah Anahu-Ambrosio 90-yard pass from Davis Harsin (Mason Lindberg kick), 5:23. Bengals 52–17. Drive: 1 plays, 90 yards, 0:12.
- IDST – Elijah Beamon 1-yard run (Mason Lindberg kick), 1:07. Bengals 59–17. Drive: 6 plays, 73 yards, 2:36.

Statistics	USD	IDST
First downs	17	22
Plays–yards	71–357	57–640
Rushes–yards	45–235	27–178
Passing yards	122	462
Passing: comp–att–int	11–26–2	19–30–0
Turnovers	2	0
Time of possession	35:21	24:39

Team	Category	Player	Statistics
San Diego	Passing	Dom Nankil	11/22, 122 yards, 2 INT
San Diego	Rushing	Omar Mbakwe	13 carries, 63 yards
San Diego	Receiving	Elijah Taylor	3 receptions, 34 yards
Idaho State	Passing	Jordan Cooke	15/26, 331 yards, 3 TD
Idaho State	Rushing	Tytan Mason	6 carries, 60 yards, TD
Idaho State	Receiving	Zedekiah Anahu-Ambrosio	3 receptions, 195 yards, 2 TD

=== at Cal Poly ===
San Diego Toreros (0–2) at Cal Poly Mustangs (2–1) – Game summary

Quarter	1	2	3	4	Total
Toreros	14	14	7	3	38
Mustangs	7	14	7	7	35

at Mustang Memorial Field • San Luis Obispo, California

- Date: September 19
- Game time: 5:00 p.m. PDT
- Game weather: Sunny • Temperature: 70 °F (21 °C) • Wind: NW 10 miles per hour (16 km/h)
- Game attendance: 10,259
- Referee: Spencer Mumford
- TV: ESPN+

Game information

First quarter

- USD – Cole Monach 7-yard pass from Dom Nankil (Emiliano Salazar kick), 5:28. Toreros 7–0. Drive: 16 plays, 88 yards, 8:07.
- CP – Jaden Green 8-yard run (Josue Lopez kick), 3:48. Tied 7–7. Drive: 6 plays, 52 yards, 1:34.
- USD – Adam Criter 55-yard run (Emiliano Salazar kick), 1:52. Toreros 14–7. Drive: 5 plays, 75 yards, 1:56.

Second quarter

- CP – Misa Paiau 26-yard run (Josue Lopez kick), 13:38. Tied 14–14. Drive: 6 plays, 73 yards, 3:07.
- USD – Cole Monach 22-yard pass from Dom Nankil (Emiliano Salazar kick), 6:11. Toreros 21–14. Drive: 6 plays, 59 yards, 2:22.
- CP – Tayvion McCoy 12-yard pass from Anthony Grigsby Jr. (Josue Lopez kick), 3:13. Tied 21–21. Drive: 6 plays, 72 yards, 2:53.
- USD – Dom Nankil 1-yard run (Emiliano Salazar kick), 0:06. Toreros 28–21. Drive: 10 plays, 79 yards, 3:02.

Third quarter

- USD – Omar Mbakwe 1-yard run (Emiliano Salazar kick), 10:09. Toreros 35–21. Drive: 11 plays, 75 yards, 4:51.
- CP – Tayvion McCoy 28-yard pass from Anthony Grigsby Jr. (Josue Lopez kick), 7:32. Toreros 35–28. Drive: 6 plays, 75 yards, 2:37.

Fourth quarter

- CP – Fidel Pitts 10-yard pass from Anthony Grigsby Jr. (Josue Lopez kick), 8:23. Tied 35–35. Drive: 5 plays, 36 yards, 1:57.
- USD – Emiliano Salazar 38-yard field goal, 0:02. Toreros 38–35. Drive: 8 plays, 57 yards, 1:04.

Statistics	USD	CP
First downs	29	18
Plays–yards	78–499	52–384
Rushes–yards	47–263	29–173
Passing yards	236	211
Passing: comp–att–int	25–31–0	14–23–0
Turnovers	0	1
Time of possession	35:49	24:11

Team	Category	Player	Statistics
San Diego	Passing	Dom Nankil	25/30, 236 yards, 2 TD
San Diego	Rushing	Adam Criter	28 carries, 178 yards, TD
San Diego	Receiving	Cole Monach	8 receptions, 87 yards, 2 TD
Cal Poly	Passing	Anthony Grigsby Jr.	14/23, 211 yards, 3 TD
Cal Poly	Rushing	Jaden Green	17 carries, 126 yards, TD
Cal Poly	Receiving	Tayvion McCoy	5 receptions, 105 yards, 2 TD

=== at St. Thomas (MN) ===
San Diego Toreros (1–2) at St. Thomas Tommies (3–1) – Game summary

Quarter	1	2	3	4	Total
Toreros	0	7	10	0	17
Tommies	14	22	7	7	50

at O'Shaughnessy Stadium • St. Paul, Minnesota

- Date: September 26
- Game time: 11:00 a.m. PDT
- Game weather: Rain • Temperature: 62 °F (17 °C) • Wind: N 7 miles per hour (11 km/h)
- Game attendance: 3,866
- Referee: Carl Chapman
- TV announcers (Midco+): Sam Ekstrom and Joe Moline

Game information

First quarter

- STMN – Pierce McCrary 4-yard pass from Nicholas Peipert (Ben Hoiland kick), 7:12. Tommies 7–0. Drive: 7 plays, 84 yards, 3:01.
- STMN – Stefano Giovannelli 75-yard pass from Nicholas Peipert (Ben Hoiland kick), 2:07. Tommies 14–0. Drive: 1 play, 75 yards, 0:11.

Second quarter

- USD – Elijah Taylor 31-yard pass from Dom Nankil (Emiliano Salazar kick), 14:53. Tommies 14–7. Drive: 6 plays, -33 yards, 2:08.
- STMN – Gabriel Abel 57-yard run (Ben Hoiland kick), 14:17. Tommies 21–7. Drive: 2 plays, 68 yards, 0:31.
- STMN – Nicholas Peipert 25-yard run (Ben Hoiland kick), 8:22. Tommies 28–7. Drive: 5 plays, 40 yards, 1:56.
- STMN – Kyle Winchester 38-yard interception return (Stefano Giovannelli run), 6:59. Tommies 36–7.

Third quarter

- USD – Dom Nankil 16-yard run (Emiliano Salazar kick), 11:46. Tommies 36–14. Drive: 8 plays, 75 yards, 3:14.
- STMN – Eli Paulson 17-yard pass from Nicholas Peipert (Ben Hoiland kick), 9:31. Tommies 43–14. Drive: 5 plays, 63 yards, 2:06.
- USD – Emiliano Salazar 30-yard field goal, 6:01. Tommies 43–17. Drive: 9 plays, 53 yards, 3:30.

Fourth quarter

- STMN – Nicholas Peipert 7-yard run (Aidan Macke kick), 10:09. Tommies 50–17. Drive: 7 plays, 76 yards, 4:51.

Statistics	USD	STMN
First downs	25	22
Plays–yards	82–398	54–554
Rushes–yards	31–75	33–304
Passing yards	323	250
Passing: comp–att–int	28–51–1	14–21–0
Turnovers	1	0
Time of possession	33:04	26:56

Team	Category	Player	Statistics
San Diego	Passing	Dom Nankil	28/50, 323 yards, INT
San Diego	Rushing	Adam Criter	18 carries, 57 yards
San Diego	Receiving	Elijah Taylor	9 receptions, 113 yards
St. Thomas (MN)	Passing	Nicholas Peipert	12/18, 239 yards, 3 TD
St. Thomas (MN)	Rushing	Gabriel Abel	15 carries, 148 yards, TD
St. Thomas (MN)	Receiving	Stefano Giovannelli	2 receptions, 110 yards, TD

=== Davidson ===
Davidson Wildcats (2–2) at San Diego Toreros (1–3) – Game summary

Quarter	1	2	3	4	Total
Wildcats	0	0	0	0	0
Toreros	0	0	0	0	0

at Torero Stadium • San Diego, California

- Date: October 3
- Game time: 1:00 p.m. PDT

Game information

First quarter
Second quarter
Third quarter
Fourth quarter

Statistics	DAV	USD
First downs		
Plays–yards		
Rushes–yards		
Passing yards		
Passing: comp–att–int		
Turnovers		
Time of possession		

Team	Category	Player	Statistics
Davidson	Passing		
Davidson	Rushing		
Davidson	Receiving		
San Diego	Passing		
San Diego	Rushing		
San Diego	Receiving		

=== at Butler ===
San Diego Toreros (2–3) at Butler Bulldogs (4–1) – Game summary

Quarter	1	2	3	4	Total
Toreros	3	0	0	7	10
Bulldogs	10	10	14	7	41

at Bud and Jackie Sellick Bowl • Indianapolis, Indiana

- Date: October 10
- Game time: 10:00 a.m. PDT
- Game weather: Cloudy • Temperature: 71 °F (22 °C) • Wind: SE at 9 miles per hour (14 km/h)
- Game attendance: 3,909
- Referee: Jason Berg
- TV announcers (ESPN+): Greg Rakestraw (play-by-play), Shawn Shepard (analyst) and Will Hicks (sideline)

Game information

First quarter

- (9:53) BUT – Sam Manna 73-yard run, Beck Janki kick (Drive: 1 play, 73 yards, 0:13; Butler 7–0)
- (4:51) USD – Emiliano Salazar 44-yard field goal (Drive: 9 plays, 48 yards, 5:02; Butler 7–3)
- (1:55) BUT – Beck Janki 34-yard field goal (Drive: 5 plays, 68 yards, 2:51; Butler 10–3)

Second quarter

- (12:50) BUT – Desmin Jackson 22-yard run, Beck Janki kick (Drive: 2 plays, 49 yards, 0:40; Butler 17–3)
- (0:00) BUT – Beck Janki 34-yard field goal (Drive: 16 plays, 83 yards, 6:14; Butler 20–3)

Third quarter

- (8:50) BUT – Gabe Passini 10-yard run, Beck Janki kick (Drive: 5 plays, 80 yards, 2:58; Butler 27–3)
- (7:14) BUT – Gabe Passini 4-yard run, Beck Janki kick (Drive: 2 plays, 15 yards, 0:48; Butler 34–3)

Fourth quarter

- (13:36) USD – Omar Mbakwe 30-yard pass from Dom Nankil, Emiliano Salazar kick (Drive: 6 plays, 61 yards, 2:19; Butler 34–10)
- (10:33) BUT – Gabe Passini 9-yard run, Beck Janki kick (Drive: 5 plays, 60 yards, 3:02; Butler 41–10)

Statistics	USD	BUT
First downs	19	17
Plays–yards	69–308	53–479
Rushes–yards	27–13	36–262
Passing yards	295	217
Passing: comp–att–int	28–42–2	11–17–0
Turnovers	2	0
Time of possession	31:23	28:37

Team	Category	Player	Statistics
San Diego	Passing	Dom Nankil	28/42, 295 yard, TD, 2 INT
San Diego	Rushing	Omar Mbakwe	9 carries, 12 yards
San Diego	Receiving	Elijah Taylor	6 receptions, 100 yards
Butler	Passing	Gabe Passini	11/16, 217 yards
Butler	Rushing	Sam Manna	9 carries, 151 yards
Butler	Receiving	Michael Nix	3 receptions, 113 yards

=== Valparaiso ===
Valparaiso Beacons (3–3) at San Diego Toreros (2–4) – Game summary

Quarter	1	2	3	4	Total
Beacons	0	0	0	0	0
Toreros	0	0	0	0	0

at Torero Stadium • San Diego, California

- Date: October 17
- Game time: 1:00 p.m.

Game information

First quarter
Second quarter
Third quarter
Fourth quarter

Statistics	VAL	USD
First downs		
Plays–yards		
Rushes–yards		
Passing yards		
Passing: comp–att–int		
Turnovers		
Time of possession		

Team	Category	Player	Statistics
Valparaiso	Passing		
Valparaiso	Rushing		
Valparaiso	Receiving		
San Diego	Passing		
San Diego	Rushing		
San Diego	Receiving		

=== at Dayton ===
San Diego Toreros (3–4) at Dayton Flyers (5–1) – Game summary

Quarter	1	2	3	4	Total
Toreros	0	0	0	0	0
Flyers	0	0	0	0	0

at Welcome Stadium • Dayton, Ohio

- Date: October 24
- Game time: 9:00 a.m. PDT

Game information

First quarter
Second quarter
Third quarter
Fourth quarter

Statistics	USD	DAY
First downs		
Plays–yards		
Rushes–yards		
Passing yards		
Passing: comp–att–int		
Turnovers		
Time of possession		

Team	Category	Player	Statistics
San Diego	Passing		
San Diego	Rushing		
San Diego	Receiving		
Dayton	Passing		
Dayton	Rushing		
Dayton	Receiving		

=== Marist ===
Marist Red Foxes (4–4) at San Diego Toreros (3–5) – Game summary

Quarter	1	2	3	4	Total
Red Foxes	0	0	0	0	0
Toreros	0	0	0	0	0

at Torero Stadium • San Diego, California

- Date: October 31
- Game time: 1:00 p.m.

Game information

First quarter
Second quarter
Third quarter
Fourth quarter

Statistics	MRST	USD
First downs		
Plays–yards		
Rushes–yards		
Passing yards		
Passing: comp–att–int		
Turnovers		
Time of possession		

Team	Category	Player	Statistics
Marist	Passing		
Marist	Rushing		
Marist	Receiving		
San Diego	Passing		
San Diego	Rushing		
San Diego	Receiving		

=== at Drake ===
San Diego Toreros (4–5) at Drake Bulldogs (3–6) – Game summary

Quarter	1	2	3	4	Total
Toreros	0	0	0	0	0
Bulldogs	0	0	0	0	0

at Drake Stadium • Des Moines, Iowa

- Date: November 7
- Game time: 10:00 a.m. PST

Game information

First quarter
Second quarter
Third quarter
Fourth quarter

Statistics	USD	DRKE
First downs		
Plays–yards		
Rushes–yards		
Passing yards		
Passing: comp–att–int		
Turnovers		
Time of possession		

Team	Category	Player	Statistics
San Diego	Passing		
San Diego	Rushing		
San Diego	Receiving		
Drake	Passing		
Drake	Rushing		
Drake	Receiving		

=== Stetson ===
Stetson Hatters (1–10) at San Diego Toreros (5–5) – Game summary

Quarter	1	2	3	4	Total
Hatters	0	0	0	0	0
Toreros	0	0	0	0	0

at Torero Stadium • San Diego, California

- Date: November 21
- Game time: 5:00 p.m.

Game information

First quarter
Second quarter
Third quarter
Fourth quarter

Statistics	STET	USD
First downs		
Plays–yards		
Rushes–yards		
Passing yards		
Passing: comp–att–int		
Turnovers		
Time of possession		

Team	Category	Player	Statistics
Stetson	Passing		
Stetson	Rushing		
Stetson	Receiving		
San Diego	Passing		
San Diego	Rushing		
San Diego	Receiving		

== Rankings ==
Ranking movements Legend: ██ Increase in ranking ██ Decrease in ranking — = Not ranked RV = Received votes
	Week														
Poll	Pre	1	2	3	4	5	6	7	8	9	10	11	12	13	Final
STATS	—	—	—	—	—										
Coaches	RV	—	RV	RV	RV										
