= 2026 Dayton Flyers football team =

American college football season

2026 Dayton Flyers football

PFL co-champion

FCS Playoffs
- Conference: Pioneer Football League

Ranking
- STATS: No. 24
- Record: 10–1 (7–1 PFL)
- Head coach: Trevor Andrews (4th season)
- Offensive coordinator: Greg Whalen (4th season)
- Defensive coordinator: John Bowles (4th season)
- Home stadium: Welcome Stadium

2026 Pioneer Football League standings
	Conf.			Overall
Team	W		L	W		L
No. 24 Dayton +^	7	–	1	10	–	1
Butler +	7	–	1	10	–	2
St. Thomas (MN)	6	–	2	9	–	3
San Diego	5	–	3	6	–	5
Marist	5	–	3	6	–	6
Valparaiso	4	–	4	5	–	6
Presbyterian	3	–	5	4	–	7
Drake	3	–	5	3	–	8
Davidson	2	–	6	4	–	8
Morehead State	2	–	6	3	–	9
Stetson	0	–	8	1	–	11
+ – Conference co-champions; ^ – FCS playoff participant; As of November 22, 2026; Rankings from STATS Poll

The 2026 Dayton Flyers football team represent the University of Dayton as a member of the Pioneer Football League (PFL) during the 2026 NCAA Division I FCS football season. The Flyers were led by fourth-year head coach Trevor Andrews and play home games at Welcome Stadium located in Dayton, Ohio.

== Schedule ==
Date	Time	Opponent	Rank	Site	TV	Result	Attendance
August 29	12:00 pm	Fairmont State*		Welcome Stadium; Dayton, OH	YouTube	W 43–20	3,185
September 12	12:00 pm	Thomas More*		Welcome Stadium; Dayton, OH	ESPN+	W 30–7	3,036
September 19	6:00 pm	at Eastern Kentucky*		Roy Kidd Stadium; Richmond, KY	ESPN+	W 17–14	4,606
October 3	1:00 pm	at Drake		Drake Stadium; Des Moines, IA	ESPN+	L 22–30	3,127
October 10	12:00 pm	Morehead State		Welcome Stadium; Dayton, OH	ESPN+	W 56–28	3,084
October 17	1:00 pm	at Butler		Bud and Jackie Sellick Bowl; Indianapolis, IN	ESPN+	W 19–9	3,917
October 24	12:00 pm	San Diego		Welcome Stadium; Dayton, OH	ESPN+	W 37–32	3,645
October 31	1:00 pm	at Stetson		Spec Martin Stadium; DeLand, FL	ESPN+	W 44–34	1,568
November 7	12:00 pm	Valparaiso		Welcome Stadium; Dayton, OH	ESPN+	W 31–20	3,845
November 14	12:00 pm	Davidson		Welcome Stadium; Dayton, OH	ESPN+	W 34–3	3,275
November 21	1:00 pm	at Presbyterian	No. 24	Bailey Memorial Stadium; Clinton, SC	ESPN+	W 27–11	1,778
*Non-conference game; Rankings from STATS Poll released prior to the game; All times are in Eastern time; Source:

== Game summaries ==
=== Fairmont State (DII) ===
Fairmont State Fighting Falcons (DII) (0–0) at Dayton Flyers (0–0) – Game summary

Quarter	1	2	3	4	Total
Fighting Falcons (DII)	0	0	7	13	20
Flyers	7	31	3	2	43

at Welcome Stadium • Dayton, Ohio

- Date: August 29
- Game time: 12:00 p.m.
- Game weather: Sunny • Temperature: 80 °F (27 °C) • Wind: S at 6 miles per hour (9.7 km/h)
- Game attendance: 3,185
- Referee: John Shay
- TV: Dayton Flyers YouTube

Game information

First quarter

- DAY – Donovan Weatherly 8-yard pass from Bryce Schondelmyer (David Maurer kick), 6:50. Flyers 7–0. Drive: 10 plays, 90 yards, 5:16.

Second quarter

- DAY – Luke Hansen 33-yard run (David Maurer kick), 12:37. Flyers 14–0. Drive: 3 plays, 53 yards, 1:34.
- DAY – Luke Hansen 2-yard run (David Maurer kick), 9:58. Flyers 21–0. Drive: 3 plays, 5 yards, 1:10.
- DAY – Mason Hackett 27-yard run (David Maurer kick), 8:43. Flyers 28–0. Drive: 1 play, 12 yards, 0:07.
- DAY – Donovan Weatherly 39-yard pass from Bryce Schondelmyer (David Maurer kick), 7:12. Flyers 35–0. Drive: 2 plays, 41 yards, 0:48.
- DAY – David Maurer 32-yard field goal, 0:02. Flyers 38–0. Drive: 12 plays, 80 yards, 1:44.

Third quarter

- FAI – Joshua Jones 26-yard run (Emmanuel Richardson kick), 14:24. Flyers 38–7. Drive: 2 plays, 66 yards, 0:36.
- DAY – David Maurer 33-yard field goal, 8:58. Flyers 41–7. Drive: 10 plays, 46 yards, 5:19.

Fourth quarter

- FAI – Chico Thomas Jr. 29-yard pass from Deven Sisler (Emmanuel Richardson kick BLOCKED), 8:10. Flyers 41–13. Drive: 2 plays, 52 yards, 0:38.
- DAY – Pat McLaughlin defensive PAT conversion, 8:10. Flyers 43–13.
- FAI – Gage Michael 10-yard pass from Deven Sisler (Emmanuel Richardson kick), 1:15. Flyers 43–20. Drive: 9 plays, 96 yards, 3:55.

Statistics	FAI	DAY
First downs	17	23
Plays–yards	65–345	71–437
Rushes–yards	36–181	41–251
Passing yards	164	186
Passing: comp–att–int	13–29–4	16–30–1
Turnovers	4	1
Time of possession	28:17	31:43

Team	Category	Player	Statistics
Fairmont State	Passing	Deven Sisler	6/9, 111 yards, 2 TD
Fairmont State	Rushing	Joshua Jones	11 carries, 108 yards, TD
Fairmont State	Receiving	Raleigh Wesley	1 reception, 44 yards
Dayton	Passing	Bryce Schondelmyer	15/25, 181 yards, 2 TD
Dayton	Rushing	Noah Spencer	9 carries, 58 yards
Dayton	Receiving	Donovan Weatherly	4 receptions, 71 yards, 2 TD

=== Thomas More (DII) ===
Thomas More Saints (DII) (0–1) at Dayton Flyers (1–0) – Game summary

Quarter	1	2	3	4	Total
Saints (DII)	7	0	0	0	7
Flyers	13	0	7	10	30

at Welcome Stadium • Dayton, Ohio

- Date: September 12
- Game time: 12:00 p.m.
- Game weather: Cloudy • Temperature: 75 °F (24 °C) • Wind: S at 4 miles per hour (6.4 km/h)
- Game attendance: 3,036
- Referee: Anthony Tarone
- TV: ESPN+

Game information

First quarter

- (12:34) DAY – Gavin Lochow 43-yard run, David Maurer kick (Drive: 3 plays, 55 yards, 1:26; Dayton 7–0)
- (7:37) DAY – Luke Hansen 28-yard run (Drive: 7 plays, 59 yards, 4:08; Dayton 13–0)
- (4:19) TMOR – Ben Chesser 12-yard run, David Burleigh kick (Drive: 6 plays, 75 yards, 3:18; Dayton 13–7)

Second quarter

No scoring plays

Third quarter

- (6:34) DAY – Gavin Lochow 8-yard pass from Bryce Schondelmyer, David Maurer kick (Drive: 8 plays, 50 yards, 4:23; Dayton 20–7)

Fourth quarter

- (9:42) DAY – David Maurer 28-yard field goal (Drive: 10 plays, 61 yards, 6:07; Dayton 23–7)
- (1:10) DAY – Noah Spencer 9-yard run, David Maurer kick (Drive: 10 plays, 71 yards, 5:37; Dayton 30–7)

Statistics	TMOR	DAY
First downs	12	21
Plays–yards	51–222	66–416
Rushes–yards	19–82	39–205
Passing yards	140	211
Passing: comp–att–int	19–32–1	19–27–2
Turnovers	2	2
Time of possession	23:14	36:46

Team	Category	Player	Statistics
Thomas More	Passing	Ben Chesser	19/32, 140 yards, INT
Thomas More	Rushing	Martavious Smith	3 carries, 40 yards
Thomas More	Receiving	Numehnne Gwilly	5 receptions, 40 yards
Dayton	Passing	Bryce Schondelmyer	19/27, 211 yards, TD, 2 INT
Dayton	Rushing	Mason Hackett	15 carries, 65 yards
Dayton	Receiving	Michael Mussari	5 receptions, 90 yards

=== at Eastern Kentucky ===
Dayton Flyers (2–0) at Eastern Kentucky Colonels (1–2) – Game summary

Quarter	1	2	3	4	Total
Flyers	0	7	7	3	17
Colonels	0	0	0	14	14

at Roy Kidd Stadium • Richmond, Kentucky

- Date: September 19
- Game time: 6:00 p.m.
- Game weather: Clear • Temperature: 87 °F (31 °C) • Wind: N at 2 miles per hour (3.2 km/h)
- Game attendance: 4,606
- Referee: Branden McCain
- TV announcers (ESPN+): Wes Chandler (play-by-play) and Terry Johnson (analyst)

Game information

First quarter

No scoring plays

Second quarter

- (0:01) DAY – Michael Mussari 4-yard pass from Bryce Schondelmyer, David Maurer kick (Drive: 7 plays, 70 yards, 1:21; Dayton 7–0)

Third quarter

- (3:05) DAY – Luke Hansen 1-yard run, David Maurer kick (Drive: 5 plays, 40 yards, 1:52; Dayton 14–0)

Fourth quarter

- (14:57) EKU – Brady Hensley 2-yard run, Buzz Flabiano kick (Drive: 9 plays, 75 yards, 3:08; Dayton 14–7)
- (11:01) DAY – David Maurer 23-yard field goal (Drive: 8 plays, 69 yards, 3:56; Dayton 17–7)
- (8:18) EKU – Caeleb Schlachter 54-yard pass from Jordyn Potts, Buzz Flabiano kick (Drive: 6 plays, 75 yards, 2:43; Dayton 17–14)

Statistics	DAY	EKU
First downs	17	23
Plays–yards	65–302	69–426
Rushes–yards	34–156	32–148
Passing yards	146	278
Passing: comp–att–int	18–31–0	24–37–0
Turnovers	0	2
Time of possession	31:33	28:27

Team	Category	Player	Statistics
Dayton	Passing	Bryce Schondelmyer	18/30, 146 yards, TD
Dayton	Rushing	Luke Hansen	14 carries, 110 yards, TD
Dayton	Receiving	Michael Mussari	7 receptions, 87 yards, TD
Eastern Kentucky	Passing	Jordyn Potts	23/36, 273 yards, TD
Eastern Kentucky	Rushing	Brady Hensley	12 carries, 93 yards, TD
Eastern Kentucky	Receiving	Elijah Caldwell	6 receptions, 67 yards

=== at Drake ===
Dayton Flyers (3–0) at Drake Bulldogs (1–3) – Game summary

Quarter	1	2	3	4	Total
Flyers	0	0	0	0	0
Bulldogs	0	0	0	0	0

at Drake Stadium • Des Moines, Iowa

- Date: October 3
- Game time: 1:00 p.m.
- TV: ESPN+

Game information

First quarter
Second quarter
Third quarter
Fourth quarter

Statistics	DAY	DRKE
First downs		
Plays–yards		
Rushes–yards		
Passing yards		
Passing: comp–att–int		
Turnovers		
Time of possession		

Team	Category	Player	Statistics
Dayton	Passing		
Dayton	Rushing		
Dayton	Receiving		
Drake	Passing		
Drake	Rushing		
Drake	Receiving		

=== Morehead State ===
Morehead State Eagles (1–4) at Dayton Flyers (3–1) – Game summary

Quarter	1	2	3	4	Total
Eagles	0	0	0	0	0
Flyers	0	0	0	0	0

at Welcome Stadium • Dayton, Ohio

- Date: October 10
- Game time: 12:00 p.m.

Game information

First quarter
Second quarter
Third quarter
Fourth quarter

Statistics	MORE	DAY
First downs		
Plays–yards		
Rushes–yards		
Passing yards		
Passing: comp–att–int		
Turnovers		
Time of possession		

Team	Category	Player	Statistics
Morehead State	Passing		
Morehead State	Rushing		
Morehead State	Receiving		
Dayton	Passing		
Dayton	Rushing		
Dayton	Receiving		

=== at Butler ===
Dayton Flyers (4–1) at Butler Bulldogs (5–1) – Game summary

Quarter	1	2	3	4	Total
Flyers	0	14	0	5	19
Bulldogs	3	0	0	6	9

at Bud and Jackie Sellick Bowl • Indianapolis, Indiana

- Date: October 17
- Game time: 1:00 p.m.
- Game weather: Sunny • Temperature: 52 °F (11 °C) • Wind: NE at 6 miles per hour (9.7 km/h)
- Game attendance: 3,917
- Referee: John Shay
- TV announcers (ESPN+): Andrew Mild (play-by-play) and Will Hicks (analyst)

Game information

First quarter

- (6:25) BUT – Beck Janki 30-yard field goal (Drive: 8 plays, 61 yards, 5:16; Butler 3–0)

Second quarter

- (13:36) DAY – Bryce Cowgill 25-yard pass from Bryce Schondelmyer, David Maurer kick (Drive: 11 plays, 89 yards, 6:24; Dayton 7–3)
- (1:47) DAY – Luke Hansen 33-yard pass from Bryce Schondelmyer, David Maurer kick (Drive: 9 plays, 85 yards, 4:47; Dayton 14–3)

Third quarter

No scoring plays

Fourth quarter

- (12:18) BUT – Nick Munson 20-yard pass from Gabe Passini, two-point conversion failed (Drive: 9 plays, 79 yards, 3:57; Dayton 14–9)
- (5:14) DAY – David Maurer 21-yard field goal (Drive: 13 plays, 61 yards, 7:04; Dayton 17–9)
- (1:11) DAY – Gabe Passini sacked in the end zone (Dayton 19–9)

Statistics	DAY	BUT
First downs	17	10
Plays–yards	72–377	47–182
Rushes–yards	36–80	21–30
Passing yards	297	152
Passing: comp–att–int	28–36–0	15–26–3
Turnovers	1	3
Time of possession	38:47	21:13

Team	Category	Player	Statistics
Dayton	Passing	Bryce Schondelmyer	28/36, 297 yards, 2 TD
Dayton	Rushing	Luke Hansen	18 carries, 70 yards
Dayton	Receiving	Ethan Thulin	4 receptions, 83 yards
Butler	Passing	Gabe Passini	15/26, 152 yards, TD, 3 INT
Butler	Rushing	Desmin Jackson	7 carries, 16 yards
Butler	Receiving	Nick Munson	5 receptions, 80 yards, TD

=== San Diego ===
San Diego Toreros (3–4) at Dayton Flyers (5–1) – Game summary

Quarter	1	2	3	4	Total
Toreros	0	0	0	0	0
Flyers	0	0	0	0	0

at Welcome Stadium • Dayton, Ohio

- Date: October 24
- Game time: 12:00 p.m.

Game information

First quarter
Second quarter
Third quarter
Fourth quarter

Statistics	USD	DAY
First downs		
Plays–yards		
Rushes–yards		
Passing yards		
Passing: comp–att–int		
Turnovers		
Time of possession		

Team	Category	Player	Statistics
San Diego	Passing		
San Diego	Rushing		
San Diego	Receiving		
Dayton	Passing		
Dayton	Rushing		
Dayton	Receiving		

=== at Stetson ===
Dayton Flyers (6–1) at Stetson Hatters (1–7) – Game summary

Quarter	1	2	3	4	Total
Flyers	0	0	0	0	0
Hatters	0	0	0	0	0

at Spec Martin Stadium • DeLand, Florida

- Date: October 31
- Game time: 1:00 p.m.

Game information

First quarter
Second quarter
Third quarter
Fourth quarter

Statistics	DAY	STET
First downs		
Plays–yards		
Rushes–yards		
Passing yards		
Passing: comp–att–int		
Turnovers		
Time of possession		

Team	Category	Player	Statistics
Dayton	Passing		
Dayton	Rushing		
Dayton	Receiving		
Stetson	Passing		
Stetson	Rushing		
Stetson	Receiving		

=== Valparaiso ===
Valparaiso Beacons (4–4) at Dayton Flyers (7–1) – Game summary

Quarter	1	2	3	4	Total
Beacons	0	0	0	0	0
Flyers	0	0	0	0	0

at Welcome Stadium • Dayton, Ohio

- Date: November 7
- Game time: 12:00 p.m.

Game information

First quarter
Second quarter
Third quarter
Fourth quarter

Statistics	VAL	DAY
First downs		
Plays–yards		
Rushes–yards		
Passing yards		
Passing: comp–att–int		
Turnovers		
Time of possession		

Team	Category	Player	Statistics
Valparaiso	Passing		
Valparaiso	Rushing		
Valparaiso	Receiving		
Dayton	Passing		
Dayton	Rushing		
Dayton	Receiving		

=== Davidson ===
Davidson Wildcats (4–6) at Dayton Flyers (8–1) – Game summary

Quarter	1	2	3	4	Total
Wildcats	0	0	0	0	0
Flyers	0	0	0	0	0

at Welcome Stadium • Dayton, Ohio

- Date: November 14
- Game time: 12:00 p.m.

Game information

First quarter
Second quarter
Third quarter
Fourth quarter

Statistics	DAV	DAY
First downs		
Plays–yards		
Rushes–yards		
Passing yards		
Passing: comp–att–int		
Turnovers		
Time of possession		

Team	Category	Player	Statistics
Davidson	Passing		
Davidson	Rushing		
Davidson	Receiving		
Dayton	Passing		
Dayton	Rushing		
Dayton	Receiving		

=== at Presbyterian ===
No. 24 Dayton Flyers (9–1) at Presbyterian Blue Hose (4–6) – Game summary

Quarter	1	2	3	4	Total
No. 24 Flyers	0	0	0	0	0
Blue Hose	0	0	0	0	0

at Bailey Memorial Stadium • Clinton, South Carolina

- Date: November 21
- Game time: 1:00 p.m.

Game information

First quarter
Second quarter
Third quarter
Fourth quarter

Statistics	DAY	PRES
First downs		
Plays–yards		
Rushes–yards		
Passing yards		
Passing: comp–att–int		
Turnovers		
Time of possession		

Team	Category	Player	Statistics
Dayton	Passing		
Dayton	Rushing		
Dayton	Receiving		
Presbyterian	Passing		
Presbyterian	Rushing		
Presbyterian	Receiving		

== Rankings ==
Ranking movements Legend: ██ Increase in ranking ██ Decrease in ranking — = Not ranked RV = Received votes
	Week														
Poll	Pre	1	2	3	4	5	6	7	8	9	10	11	12	13	Final
STATS	—	—	—	—	—	—	—	—	—	RV	RV	RV	24		
Coaches	—	—	—	—	—	—	—	—	—	—	RV	RV	RV		
