= 2026 St. Thomas Tommies football team =

American college football season

2026 St. Thomas Tommies football
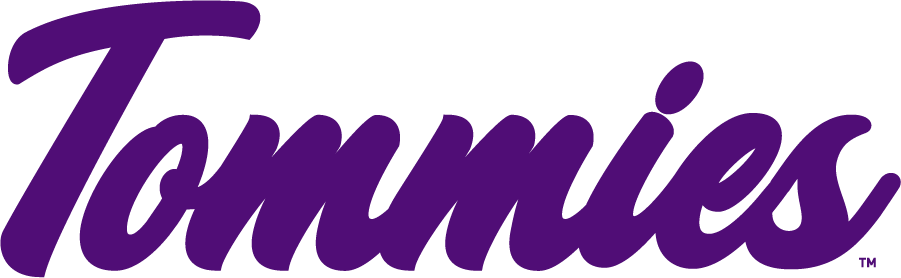
- Conference: Pioneer Football League
- Record: 9–3 (6–2 PFL)
- Head coach: Glenn Caruso (18th season)
- Offensive coordinator: Jay MacIntyre (2nd season)
- Defensive coordinator: Wallie Kuchinski (18th season)
- Home stadium: O'Shaughnessy Stadium

2026 Pioneer Football League standings
	Conf.			Overall
Team	W		L	W		L
No. 24 Dayton +^	7	–	1	10	–	1
Butler +	7	–	1	10	–	2
St. Thomas (MN)	6	–	2	9	–	3
Marist	5	–	3	6	–	6
San Diego	4	–	3	5	–	5
Valparaiso	4	–	4	5	–	6
Presbyterian	3	–	5	4	–	7
Drake	3	–	5	3	–	8
Davidson	2	–	6	4	–	8
Morehead State	2	–	6	3	–	9
Stetson	0	–	7	1	–	10
+ – Conference co-champions; ^ – FCS playoff participant; As of November 22, 2026; Rankings from STATS Poll

The 2026 St. Thomas Tommies football team will represent the University of St. Thomas during the 2026 NCAA Division I FCS football season as a member of the Pioneer Football League (PFL). The Tommies will be led by 18th-year head coach Glenn Caruso and play home games at O'Shaughnessy Stadium in St. Paul, Minnesota.

== Schedule ==
Date	Time	Opponent	Site	TV	Result	Attendance
August 27	6:00 p.m.	Winona State*	O'Shaughnessy Stadium; St. Paul, MN	Midco Sports Plus	W 15–9	3,006
September 5	3:00 p.m.	at No. 8 North Dakota*	Alerus Center; Grand Forks, ND	Midco Sports/ESPN+	L 26–62	10,909
September 12	1:00 p.m.	Northern Michigan*	O'Shaughnessy Stadium; St. Paul, MN	Midco Sports Plus	W 56–14	3,163
September 19	1:00 p.m.	Southern Utah*	O'Shaughnessy Stadium; St. Paul, MN	Midco Sports Plus	W 28–26	2,182
September 26	1:00 p.m.	San Diego^{†}	O'Shaughnessy Stadium; St. Paul, MN	Midco Sports Plus	W 50–17	3,866
October 3	12:00 p.m.	at Presbyterian	Bailey Memorial Stadium; Clinton, SC	ESPN+	L 21–55	1,741
October 10	1:00 p.m.	Stetson	O'Shaughnessy Stadium; St. Paul, MN	Midco Sports Plus	W 64–21	3,840
October 24	11:00 a.m.	at Marist	Leonidoff Field; Poughkeepsie, NY	ESPN+	W 35–13	2,840
October 31	1:00 p.m.	Davidson	O'Shaughnessy Stadium; St. Paul, MN	Midco Sports Plus	W 35–7	1,704
November 7	12:00 p.m.	at Butler	Bud and Jackie Sellick Bowl; Indianapolis, IN	ESPN+	L 14–41	3,029
November 14	1:00 p.m.	Drake	O'Shaughnessy Stadium; St. Paul, MN	Midco Sports Plus	W 55–35	2,466
November 21	1:00 p.m.	at Valparaiso	Brown Field; Valparaiso, IN	ESPN+	W 13–7	1,592
*Non-conference game; ^{†}Homecoming; Rankings from STATS Poll released prior to the game; All times are in Central time; Source:

== Game summaries ==
=== Winona State (DII) ===
Winona State Warriors (DII) (0–0) at St. Thomas Tommies (0–0) – Game summary

Quarter	1	2	3	4	Total
Warriors (DII)	0	3	0	6	9
Tommies	0	6	3	6	15

at O'Shaughnessy Stadium • St. Paul, Minnesota

- Date: August 27
- Game time: 6:00 p.m.
- Game weather: Sunny • Temperature: 79 °F (26 °C) • Wind: SE at 6 miles per hour (9.7 km/h)
- Game attendance: 3,006
- TV announcers (Midco+): Sam Ekstrom (play-by-play) and Joe Moline (analyst)

Game information

First quarter

- No scoring plays.

Second quarter

- WIN – Evan Swanstrom 32-yard field goal, 5:39. Warriors 3–0. Drive: 12 plays, 76 yards, 6:41.
- STMN – Anthony Policare 1-yard run (Ben Hoiland PAT failed), 0:39. Tommies 6–3. Drive: 10 plays, 75 yards, 5:00.

Third quarter

- STMN – Ben Hoiland 31-yard field goal, 8:36. Tommies 9–3. Drive: 13 plays, 61 yards, 6:24.

Fourth quarter

- WIN – Jahmani Muhammad 22-yard run (Evan Swanstrom PAT failed), 3:57. Tied 9–9. Drive: 7 plays, 73 yards, 4:05.
- STMN – Pierce McCrary 47-yard pass from Anthony Policare (Ben Hoiland PAT failed), 0:58. Tommies 15–9. Drive: 1 play, 47 yards, 0:10.

Statistics	WIN	STMN
First downs	15	14
Plays–yards	58–260	57–322
Rushes–yards	33–144	35–156
Passing yards	116	166
Passing: comp–att–int	13–25–1	13–22–0
Turnovers	1	0
Time of possession	30:08	29:52

Team	Category	Player	Statistics
Winona State	Passing	Jackson Flottmeyer	13/25, 116 yards, INT
Winona State	Rushing	Jahmani Muhammad	14 carries, 75 yards, TD
Winona State	Receiving	James Durst	5 receptions, 54 yards
St. Thomas (MN)	Passing	Anthony Policare	13/22, 213 yards, TD
St. Thomas (MN)	Rushing	Gabriel Abel	13 carries, 75 yards
St. Thomas (MN)	Receiving	Pierce McCrary	5 receptions, 83 yards, TD

=== at No. 8 North Dakota ===
St. Thomas Tommies (1–0) at No. 8 North Dakota Fighting Hawks (1–0) – Game summary

Quarter	1	2	3	4	Total
Tommies	0	12	7	7	26
No. 8 Fighting Hawks	20	21	7	14	62

at Alerus Center • Grand Forks, North Dakota

- Date: September 5
- Game time: 3:00 p.m.
- Game weather: none (played indoors)
- Game attendance: 10,909
- Referee: Tyler Downs
- TV announcers (Midco/ESPN+): Alex Heinert (play-by-play) and Ryan Kasowski (analyst)

Game information

First quarter

- UND – Avery Dixon 34-yard interception return (Kenten Laughman kick), 14:10. Fighting Hawks 7–0.
- UND – Korey Tai 8-yard pass from Jerry Kaminski (Kenten Laughman kick), 6:13. Fighting Hawks 14–0. Drive: 10 plays, 95 yards, 4:25.
- UND – Deng Deng 6-yard pass from Jerry Kaminski (pass failed), 2:32. Fighting Hawks 20–0. Drive: 5 plays, 52 yards, 2:03.

Second quarter

- UND – Mason South 5-yard pass from Jerry Kaminski (Kenten Laughman kick), 12:47. Fighting Hawks 27–0. Drive: 5 plays, 69 yards, 2:03.
- STMN – Ben Hoiland 49-yard field goal, 8:57. Fighting Hawks 27–3. Drive: 4 plays, 2 yards, 0:52.
- UND – Korey Tai 11-yard pass from Jerry Kaminski (Kenten Laughman kick), 7:02. Fighting Hawks 34–3. Drive: 5 plays, 74 yards, 1:52.
- STMN – Malachi Boadi-Aboagye 74-yard interception return (Ben Hoiland PAT failed), 4:41. Fighting Hawks 34–9.
- UND – Sam Strandell 6-yard pass from Jerry Kaminski (Kenten Laughman kick), 0:24. Fighting Hawks 41–9. Drive: 13 plays, 60 yards, 4:12.
- STMN – Ben Hoiland 40-yard field goal, 0:00. Fighting Hawks 41–12. Drive: 3 plays, 0 yards, 0:15.

Third quarter

- UND – Charles Langama 15-yard run (Kenten Laughman kick), 5:50. Fighting Hawks 48–12. Drive: 10 plays, 72 yards, 5:17.
- STMN – Patrick Wagner 27-yard pass from Nick Peipert (Ben Hoiland kick), 2:59. Fighting Hawks 48–19. Drive: 1 play, 27 yards, 0:06.

Fourth quarter

- UND – Griffin Broderick 1-yard run (Kenten Laughman kick), 13:10. Fighting Hawks 55–19. Drive: 10 plays, 47 yards, 4:42.
- STMN – Noah Long 1-yard run (Ben Hoiland kick), 11:21. Fighting Hawks 55–26. Drive: 4 plays, 75 yards, 1:49.
- UND – Javance Tupou'ata-Johnson 1-yard run (Kenten Laughman kick), 8:52. Fighting Hawks 62–26. Drive: 6 plays, 44 yards, 2:21.

Statistics	STMN	UND
First downs	14	27
Plays–yards	60–293	73–528
Rushes–yards	27–54	43–295
Passing yards	239	233
Passing: comp–att–int	17–33–1	23–30–2
Turnovers	1	3
Time of possession	29:10	30:50

Team	Category	Player	Statistics
St. Thomas (MN)	Passing	Anthony Policare	12/24, 128 yards, INT
St. Thomas (MN)	Rushing	Mordecai Ford	6 carries, 26 yards
St. Thomas (MN)	Receiving	Stefano Giovannelli	3 receptions, 75 yards
North Dakota	Passing	Jerry Kaminski	23/29, 233 yards, 5 TD, INT
North Dakota	Rushing	Charles Langama	11 carries, 120 yards, TD
North Dakota	Receiving	Deng Deng	4 receptions, 82 yards, TD

=== Northern Michigan (DII) ===
Northern Michigan Wildcats (DII) (0–2) at St. Thomas Tommies (1–1) – Game summary

Quarter	1	2	3	4	Total
Wildcats (DII)	7	0	7	0	14
Tommies	15	20	0	21	56

at O'Shaughnessy Stadium • St. Paul, Minnesota

- Date: September 12
- Game time: 1:00 p.m.
- Game weather: Sunny • Temperature: 71 °F (22 °C) • Wind: SE
- Game attendance: 3,163
- Referee: Chris Gibbs
- TV announcers (Midco+): Sam Ekstrom (play-by-play) and Joe Moline (analyst)

Game information

First quarter

- (10:52) STMN – Gabriel Abel 14-yard run, Ben Hoiland kick (Drive: 10 plays, 65 yards, 4:08; Tommies 7–0)
- (8:02) STMN – Stefano Giovannelli 26-yard pass from Nicholas Peipert, Noah Long rush (Drive: 4 plays, 53 yards, 1:08; Tommies 15–0)
- (0:09) NMU – Wilson Ptacek 30-yard pass from Duke Shovald, Sawyer McLinden kick (Drive: 7 plays, 72 yards, 3:37; Tommies 15–7)

Second quarter

- (6:01) STMN – Gabriel Abel 4-yard run, Ben Hoiland kick (Drive: 9 plays, 77 yards, 3:39; Tommies 22–7)
- (4:48) STMN – Nicholas Peipert 9-yard run, Ben Hoiland kick (Drive: 2 plays, 35 yards, 0:26; Tommies 29–7)
- (2:28) STMN – Ben Hoiland 33-yard field goal (Drive: 7 plays, 46 yards, 1:27; Tommies 32–7)
- (0:42) STMN – Ben Hoiland 50-yard field goal (Drive: 7 plays, 14 yards, 1:02; Tommies 35–7)

Third quarter

- (2:30) NMU – Wilson Ptacek 27-yard pass from Liam Oczkowski, Sawyer McLinden kick (Drive: 10 plays, 88 yards, 6:27; Tommies 35–14)

Fourth quarter

- (14:54) STMN – Gabriel Abel 8-yard run, Aidan Macke kick (Drive: 5 plays, 50 yards, 2:28; Tommies 42–14)
- (10:22) STMN – Quentin Cobb-Butler 32-yard pass from Nicholas Peipert, Aidan Macke kick (Drive: 4 plays, 48 yards, 1:42; Tommies 49–14)
- (5:40) STMN – Owen Lyons 17-yard pass from Jack Wallace, Ben Hoiland kick (Drive: 8 plays, 57 yards, 3:18; Tommies 56–14)

Statistics	NMU	STMN
First downs	18	27
Plays–yards	68–343	70–496
Rushes–yards	43–169	40–185
Passing yards	174	311
Passing: comp–att–int	13–25–1	18–30–1
Turnovers	4	1
Time of possession	31:51	28:09

Team	Category	Player	Statistics
Northern Michigan	Passing	Liam Oczkowski	11/17, 137 yards, TD, INT
Northern Michigan	Rushing	Noah Dobert	27 carries, 142 yards
Northern Michigan	Receiving	Wilson Ptacek	3 receptions, 60 yards, 2 TD
St. Thomas (MN)	Passing	Nicholas Peipert	15/27, 270 yards, 2 TD, INT
St. Thomas (MN)	Rushing	Gabriel Abel	8 carries, 44 yards, 3 TD
St. Thomas (MN)	Receiving	Pierce McCrary	3 receptions, 69 yards

=== Southern Utah ===
Southern Utah Thunderbirds (1–2) at St. Thomas Tommies (2–1) – Game summary

Quarter	1	2	3	4	Total
Thunderbirds	10	7	3	6	26
Tommies	7	14	7	0	28

at O'Shaughnessy Stadium • St. Paul, Minnesota

- Date: September 19
- Game time: 1:00 p.m.
- Game weather: Rain • Temperature: 62 °F (17 °C) • Wind: S 2 miles per hour (3.2 km/h)
- Game attendance: 2,182
- Referee: Shay John
- TV announcers (Midco+): Sam Ekstrom (play-by-play) and Joe Moline (analyst)

Game information

First quarter

- STMN – Quentin Cobb-Butler 63-yard pass from Nicholas Peipert (Ben Hoiland kick), 9:29. Tommies 7–0. Drive: 4 plays, 80 yards, 2:05.
- SUU – Jayden Rogers 20-yard field goal, 5:15. Tommies 7–3. Drive: 10 plays, 65 yards, 4:14.
- SUU – Parker Vance 29-yard interception return (Jayden Rogers kick), 8:52. Thunderbirds 10–7.

Second quarter

- STMN – Joseph Koch 1-yard run (Ben Hoiland kick), 8:02. Tommies 14–10. Drive: 5 plays, 51 yards, 2:00.
- SUU – Will Burns 9-yard run (Jayden Rogers kick), 2:57. Thunderbirds 17–14. Drive: 8 plays, 75 yards, 5:05.
- STMN – Nicholas Peipert 1-yard run (Ben Hoiland kick), 0:00. Tommies 21–17. Drive: 11 plays, 77 yards, 2:51.

Third quarter

- STMN – Gabriel Abel 78-yard run (Ben Hoiland kick), 9:37. Tommies 28–17. Drive: 2 plays, 80 yards, 0:48.
- SUU – Jayden Rogers 22-yard field goal, 3:47. Tommies 28–20. Drive: 4 plays, 8 yards, 1:42.

Fourth quarter

- SUU – Mark Bails Jr. 18-yard pass from Will Burns (pass failed), 0:24. Tommies 28–26. Drive: 4 plays, 45 yards, 0:22.

Statistics	SUU	STMN
First downs	17	16
Plays–yards	63–367	68–406
Rushes–yards	35–146	38–175
Passing yards	221	231
Passing: comp–att–int	20–28–0	16–30–1
Turnovers	1	1
Time of possession	31:35	28:25

Team	Category	Player	Statistics
Southern Utah	Passing	Will Burns	20/28, 221 yards, TD
Southern Utah	Rushing	Floyd Chalk	26 carries, 118 yards
Southern Utah	Receiving	Mark Bails	4 receptions, 106 yards, TD
St. Thomas (MN)	Passing	Nicholas Peipert	16/29, 231 yards, TD, INT
St. Thomas (MN)	Rushing	Gabriel Abel	19 carries, 120 yards, TD
St. Thomas (MN)	Receiving	Quentin Cobb-Butler	4 receptions, 108 yards, TD

=== San Diego ===
San Diego Toreros (1–2) at St. Thomas Tommies (3–1) – Game summary

Quarter	1	2	3	4	Total
Toreros	0	7	10	0	17
Tommies	14	22	7	7	50

at O'Shaughnessy Stadium • St. Paul, Minnesota

- Date: September 26
- Game time: 1:00 p.m.
- Game weather: Rain • Temperature: 62 °F (17 °C) • Wind: N 7 miles per hour (11 km/h)
- Game attendance: 3,866
- Referee: Carl Chapman
- TV announcers (Midco+): Sam Ekstrom (play-by-play) and Joe Moline (analyst)

Game information

First quarter

- STMN – Pierce McCrary 4-yard pass from Nicholas Peipert (Ben Hoiland kick), 7:12. Tommies 7–0. Drive: 7 plays, 84 yards, 3:01.
- STMN – Stefano Giovannelli 75-yard pass from Nicholas Peipert (Ben Hoiland kick), 2:07. Tommies 14–0. Drive: 1 play, 75 yards, 0:11.

Second quarter

- USD – Elijah Taylor 31-yard pass from Dom Nankil (Emiliano Salazar kick), 14:53. Tommies 14–7. Drive: 6 plays, -33 yards, 2:08.
- STMN – Gabriel Abel 57-yard run (Ben Hoiland kick), 14:17. Tommies 21–7. Drive: 2 plays, 68 yards, 0:31.
- STMN – Nicholas Peipert 25-yard run (Ben Hoiland kick), 8:22. Tommies 28–7. Drive: 5 plays, 40 yards, 1:56.
- STMN – Kyle Winchester 38-yard interception return (Stefano Giovannelli run), 6:59. Tommies 36–7.

Third quarter

- USD – Dom Nankil 16-yard run (Emiliano Salazar kick), 11:46. Tommies 36–14. Drive: 8 plays, 75 yards, 3:14.
- STMN – Eli Paulson 17-yard pass from Nicholas Peipert (Ben Hoiland kick), 9:31. Tommies 43–14. Drive: 5 plays, 63 yards, 2:06.
- USD – Emiliano Salazar 30-yard field goal, 6:01. Tommies 43–17. Drive: 9 plays, 53 yards, 3:30.

Fourth quarter

- STMN – Nicholas Peipert 7-yard run (Aidan Macke kick), 10:09. Tommies 50–17. Drive: 7 plays, 76 yards, 4:51.

Statistics	USD	STMN
First downs	25	22
Plays–yards	82–398	54–554
Rushes–yards	31–75	33–304
Passing yards	323	250
Passing: comp–att–int	28–51–1	14–21–0
Turnovers	1	0
Time of possession	33:04	26:56

Team	Category	Player	Statistics
San Diego	Passing	Dom Nankil	28/50, 323 yards, INT
San Diego	Rushing	Adam Criter	18 carries, 57 yards
San Diego	Receiving	Elijah Taylor	9 receptions, 113 yards
St. Thomas (MN)	Passing	Nicholas Peipert	12/18, 239 yards, 3 TD
St. Thomas (MN)	Rushing	Gabriel Abel	15 carries, 148 yards, TD
St. Thomas (MN)	Receiving	Stefano Giovannelli	2 receptions, 110 yards, TD

=== at Presbyterian ===
St. Thomas Tommies (4–1) at Presbyterian Blue Hose (1–3) – Game summary

Quarter	1	2	3	4	Total
Tommies	0	0	0	0	0
Blue Hose	0	0	0	0	0

at Bailey Memorial Stadium • Clinton, South Carolina

- Date: October 3
- Game time: 12:00 p.m.

Game information

First quarter
Second quarter
Third quarter
Fourth quarter

Statistics	STMN	PRES
First downs		
Plays–yards		
Rushes–yards		
Passing yards		
Passing: comp–att–int		
Turnovers		
Time of possession		

Team	Category	Player	Statistics
St. Thomas (MN)	Passing		
St. Thomas (MN)	Rushing		
St. Thomas (MN)	Receiving		
Presbyterian	Passing		
Presbyterian	Rushing		
Presbyterian	Receiving		

=== Stetson ===
Stetson Hatters (1–4) at St. Thomas Tommies (4–2) – Game summary

Quarter	1	2	3	4	Total
Hatters	0	0	0	0	0
Tommies	0	0	0	0	0

at O'Shaughnessy Stadium • St. Paul, Minnesota

- Date: October 10
- Game time: 1:00 p.m.

Game information

First quarter
Second quarter
Third quarter
Fourth quarter

Statistics	STET	STMN
First downs		
Plays–yards		
Rushes–yards		
Passing yards		
Passing: comp–att–int		
Turnovers		
Time of possession		

Team	Category	Player	Statistics
Stetson	Passing		
Stetson	Rushing		
Stetson	Receiving		
St. Thomas (MN)	Passing		
St. Thomas (MN)	Rushing		
St. Thomas (MN)	Receiving		

=== at Marist ===
St. Thomas Tommies (5–2) at Marist Red Foxes (4–3) – Game summary

Quarter	1	2	3	4	Total
Tommies	0	0	0	0	0
Red Foxes	0	0	0	0	0

at Leonidoff Field • Poughkeepsie, New York

- Date: October 24
- Game time: 11:00 a.m.

Game information

First quarter
Second quarter
Third quarter
Fourth quarter

Statistics	STMN	MRST
First downs		
Plays–yards		
Rushes–yards		
Passing yards		
Passing: comp–att–int		
Turnovers		
Time of possession		

Team	Category	Player	Statistics
St. Thomas (MN)	Passing		
St. Thomas (MN)	Rushing		
St. Thomas (MN)	Receiving		
Marist	Passing		
Marist	Rushing		
Marist	Receiving		

=== Davidson ===
Davidson Wildcats (3–5) at St. Thomas Tommies (6–2) – Game summary

Quarter	1	2	3	4	Total
Wildcats	0	0	0	0	0
Tommies	0	0	0	0	0

at O'Shaughnessy Stadium • St. Paul, Minnesota

- Date: October 31
- Game time: 1:00 p.m.

Game information

First quarter
Second quarter
Third quarter
Fourth quarter

Statistics	DAV	STMN
First downs		
Plays–yards		
Rushes–yards		
Passing yards		
Passing: comp–att–int		
Turnovers		
Time of possession		

Team	Category	Player	Statistics
Davidson	Passing		
Davidson	Rushing		
Davidson	Receiving		
St. Thomas (MN)	Passing		
St. Thomas (MN)	Rushing		
St. Thomas (MN)	Receiving		

=== at Butler ===
St. Thomas Tommies (7–2) at Butler Bulldogs (7–2) – Game summary

Quarter	1	2	3	4	Total
Tommies	7	0	7	0	14
Bulldogs	3	17	7	14	41

at Bud and Jackie Sellick Bowl • Indianapolis, Indiana

- Date: November 7
- Game time: 12:00 p.m.
- Game weather: Sunny • Temperature: 47 °F (8 °C)
- Game attendance: 3,029
- Referee: Tyler Downs
- TV announcers (ESPN+): Dante Lang (play-by-play) and Will Hicks (analyst)

Game information

First quarter

- (8:49) BUT – Evan Windley 44-yard field goal (Drive: 10 plays, 44 yards, 6:06; Butler 3–0)
- (4:39) STMN – Nick Peipert 1-yard run, Ben Hoiland kick (Drive: 8 plays, 71 yards, 4:10; St. Thomas 7–3)

Second quarter

- (9:49) BUT – Desmin Jackson 19-yard run, Beck Janki kick (Drive: 6 plays, 57 yards, 2:52; Butler 10–7)
- (3:45) BUT – Michael Dellumo 67-yard run, Beck Janki kick (Drive: 3 plays, 75 yards, 1:26; Butler 17–7)
- (1:04) BUT – Beck Janki 32-yard field goal (Drive: 5 plays, 17 yards, 1:01; Butler 20–7)

Third quarter

- (14:11) BUT – Nick Munson 23-yard pass from Gabe Passini, Beck Janki kick (Drive: 1 play, 23 yards, 0:05; Butler 27–7)
- (2:59) STMN – Anthony Policare 9-yard run, Ben Hoiland kick (Drive: 9 plays, 77 yards, 3:57; Butler 27–14)

Fourth quarter

- (12:29) BUT – Michael Nix 29-yard pass from Gabe Passini, Beck Janki kick (Drive: 4 plays, 51 yards, 2:29; Butler 34–14)
- (9:32) BUT – Michael Dellumo 56-yard run, Beck Janki kick (Drive: 2 plays, 60 yards, 0:57; Butler 41–14)

Statistics	STMN	BUT
First downs	14	15
Plays–yards	69–276	59–388
Rushes–yards	37–77	36–253
Passing yards	199	135
Passing: comp–att–int	19–32–1	13–23–0
Turnovers	3	0
Time of possession	29:54	30:06

Team	Category	Player	Statistics
St. Thomas (MN)	Passing	Anthony Policare	15/26, 152 yards, INT
St. Thomas (MN)	Rushing	Nick Peipert	4 carries, 38 yards, TD
St. Thomas (MN)	Receiving	Quentin Cobb-Butler	6 receptions, 73 yards
Butler	Passing	Gabe Passini	13/23, 135 yards, 2 TD
Butler	Rushing	Michael Dellumo	8 carries, 143 yards, 2 TD
Butler	Receiving	Michael Nix	4 receptions, 45 yards, TD

=== Drake ===
Drake Bulldogs (3–7) at St. Thomas Tommies (7–3) – Game summary

Quarter	1	2	3	4	Total
Bulldogs	0	0	0	0	0
Tommies	0	0	0	0	0

at O'Shaughnessy Stadium • St. Paul, Minnesota

- Date: November 14
- Game time: 1:00 p.m.

Game information

First quarter
Second quarter
Third quarter
Fourth quarter

Statistics	DRKE	STMN
First downs		
Plays–yards		
Rushes–yards		
Passing yards		
Passing: comp–att–int		
Turnovers		
Time of possession		

Team	Category	Player	Statistics
Drake	Passing		
Drake	Rushing		
Drake	Receiving		
St. Thomas (MN)	Passing		
St. Thomas (MN)	Rushing		
St. Thomas (MN)	Receiving		

=== at Valparaiso ===
St. Thomas Tommies (8–3) at Valparaiso Beacons (5–5) – Game summary

Quarter	1	2	3	4	Total
Tommies	0	0	0	0	0
Beacons	0	0	0	0	0

at Brown Field • Valparaiso, Indiana

- Date: November 21
- Game time: 1:00 p.m.

Game information

First quarter
Second quarter
Third quarter
Fourth quarter

Statistics	STMN	VAL
First downs		
Plays–yards		
Rushes–yards		
Passing yards		
Passing: comp–att–int		
Turnovers		
Time of possession		

Team	Category	Player	Statistics
St. Thomas (MN)	Passing		
St. Thomas (MN)	Rushing		
St. Thomas (MN)	Receiving		
Valparaiso	Passing		
Valparaiso	Rushing		
Valparaiso	Receiving		

== Rankings ==
Ranking movements Legend: ██ Increase in ranking ██ Decrease in ranking — = Not ranked RV = Received votes
	Week														
Poll	Pre	1	2	3	4	5	6	7	8	9	10	11	12	13	Final
STATS	—	—	—	—	—	—									
Coaches	RV	—	—	—	RV	RV									
