= 2026 Butler Bulldogs football team =

American college football season

2026 Butler Bulldogs football

PFL co-champion
- Conference: Pioneer Football League
- Record: 10–2 (7–1 PFL)
- Head coach: Kevin Lynch (2nd season)
- Defensive coordinator: Jared Heck (1st season)
- Home stadium: Bud and Jackie Sellick Bowl

2026 Pioneer Football League standings
	Conf.			Overall
Team	W		L	W		L
No. 24 Dayton +^	7	–	1	10	–	1
Butler +	7	–	1	10	–	2
St. Thomas (MN)	6	–	2	9	–	3
San Diego	5	–	3	6	–	5
Marist	5	–	3	6	–	6
Valparaiso	4	–	4	5	–	6
Presbyterian	3	–	5	4	–	7
Drake	3	–	5	3	–	8
Davidson	2	–	6	4	–	8
Morehead State	2	–	6	3	–	9
Stetson	0	–	8	1	–	11
+ – Conference co-champions; ^ – FCS playoff participant; As of November 22, 2026; Rankings from STATS Poll

The 2026 Butler Bulldogs football team represented Butler University as a member of the Pioneer Football League (PFL) during the 2026 NCAA Division I FCS football season. They were led by second-year head coach Kevin Lynch. Lynch was assisted by first-year defensive coordinator Jared Heck. The Bulldogs played their home games at the Bud and Jackie Sellick Bowl in Indianapolis, Indiana.

The Bulldogs compiled a 10–2 overall record (the second 10-win season in program history and first since 2009) and a conference mark of 7–1, sharing the PFL championship with Dayton. It was Butler’s 26th conference championship in program history, 5th PFL title (first since 2013) and first under Lynch. However, due to a head-to-head loss to the Flyers, the Bulldogs did not receive the PFL’s automatic bid to the 2026 FCS playoff.

== Schedule ==
Date	Time	Opponent	Site	TV	Result	Attendance
August 29	1:00 pm	No. 20 (NAIA) Georgetown (KY)*	Bud and Jackie Sellick Bowl; Indianapolis, IN	ESPN+	W 27–23	2,823
September 5	8:30 pm	at No. 1 Montana State*	Bobcat Stadium; Bozeman, MT	ESPN+	L 24–51	22,277
September 12	6:00 pm	Franklin (IN)*	Bud and Jackie Sellick Bowl; Indianapolis, IN	ESPN+	W 52–0	3,838
September 19	1:00 pm	Chicago State*^{†}	Bud and Jackie Sellick Bowl; Indianapolis, IN	ESPN+	W 47–20	4,774
September 26	2:00 pm	at Valparaiso	Brown Field; Valparaiso, IN (Hoosier Helmet Trophy)	ESPN+	W 33–28	2,888
October 10	1:00 pm	San Diego	Bud and Jackie Sellick Bowl; Indianapolis, IN	ESPN+	W 41–10	3,909
October 17	1:00 pm	Dayton	Bud and Jackie Sellick Bowl; Indianapolis, IN	ESPN+	L 9–19	3,917
October 24	1:00 pm	at Drake	Drake Stadium; Des Moines, IA	ESPN+	W 33–21	2,560
October 31	1:00 pm	at Presbyterian	Bailey Memorial Stadium; Clinton, SC	ESPN+	W 27–10	2,435
November 7	1:00 pm	St. Thomas (MN)	Bud and Jackie Sellick Bowl; Indianapolis, IN	ESPN+	W 41–14	3,029
November 14	12:00 pm	at Marist	Tenney Stadium at Leonidoff Field; Poughkeepsie, NY	ESPN+	W 28–0	2,167
November 21	1:00 pm	Morehead State	Bud and Jackie Sellick Bowl; Indianapolis, IN	ESPN+	W 24–7	3,187
*Non-conference game; ^{†}Homecoming; Rankings from STATS Poll released prior to the game; All times are in Eastern time

== Game summaries ==
=== No. 20 (NAIA) Georgetown (KY) ===
No. 20 (NAIA) Georgetown Tigers (0–0) at Butler Bulldogs (0–0) – Game summary

Quarter	1	2	3	4	Total
No. 20 (NAIA) Tigers	10	10	3	0	23
Bulldogs	0	17	7	3	27

at Bud and Jackie Sellick Bowl • Indianapolis, Indiana

- Date: Saturday, August 29, 2026
- Game time: 1:00 p.m. EDT
- Game weather: Sunny • Temperature: 79 °F (26 °C)
- Game attendance: 2,823
- Referee: Greg Gompf
- TV announcers (ESPN+): Jonathan Matthes (play-by-play) and Will Hicks (analyst)
- Box Score

Game information

First quarter

- (7:57) GTWN – Braden Widener 24-yard field goal (Drive: 8 plays, 68 yards, 3:42; Georgetown 3–0)
- (2:23) GTWN – Clayton Davis 21-yard pass from Justice Burnam, Braden Widener kick (Drive: 7 plays, 47 yards, 3:11; Georgetown 10–0)

Second quarter

- (13:41) BUT – Beck Janki 34-yard field goal (Drive: 8 plays, 49 yards, 3:42; Georgetown 10–3)
- (11:16) GTWN – Javyn Martin 66-yard blocked field goal return, Braden Widener kick (Georgetown 17–3)
- (5:21) BUT – Chet Yardley 20-yard pass from Gabe Passini, Beck Janki kick (Drive: 6 plays, 61 yards, 5:48; Georgetown 17–10)
- (1:56) BUT – Desmin Jackson 1-yard run, Beck Janki kick (Drive: 5 plays, 38 yards, 1:43; Tied 17–17)
- (0:00) GTWN – Braden Widener 20-yard field goal (Drive: 10 plays, 85 yards, 1:49; Georgetown 20–17)

Third quarter

- (4:54) GTWN – Braden Widener 40-yard field goal (Drive: 8 plays, 57 yards, 3:13; Georgetown 23–17)
- (1:30) BUT – Gabe Passini 9-yard run, Beck Janki kick (Drive: 6 plays, 77 yards, 3:18; Butler 24–23)

Fourth quarter

- (10:14) BUT – Beck Janki 27-yard field goal (Drive: 11 plays, 26 yards, 4:36; Butler 27–23)

Statistics	GTKY	BUT
First downs	19	15
Plays–yards	66–370	67–367
Rushes–yards	23–34	43–217
Passing yards	336	150
Passing: comp–att–int	24–43–1	15–24–0
Turnovers	2	0
Time of possession	24:15	35:45

Team	Category	Player	Statistics
Georgetown (KY)	Passing	Justice Burnam	24/43, 336 yards, TD, INT
Georgetown (KY)	Rushing	Guy Bailey	7 carries, 21 yards
Georgetown (KY)	Receiving	Clayton Davis	6 receptions, 100 yards, TD
Butler	Passing	Gabe Passini	14/23, 145 yards, TD
Butler	Rushing	Gabe Passini	23 carries, 176 yards, TD
Butler	Receiving	Chet Yardley	4 receptions, 59 yards, TD

=== at No. 1 Montana State ===
Butler Bulldogs (1–0) at No. 1 Montana State Bobcats (1–0) – Game summary

Quarter	1	2	3	4	Total
Bulldogs	3	0	14	7	24
No. 1 Bobcats	10	20	7	14	51

at Bobcat Stadium • Bozeman, Montana

- Date: Saturday, September 5, 2026
- Game time: 8:30 p.m. EDT
- Game weather: Sunny • Temperature: 70 °F (21 °C) • Wind: SE at 9 miles per hour (14 km/h)
- Game attendance: 22,277
- Referee: Spencer Mumford
- TV announcers (ESPN+): Ben Creighton (play-by-play), Ty Gregorak (analyst) and Toni Wetmore (sideline)
- Box Score

Game information

First quarter

- (6:05) MTST – Myles Sansted 45-yard field goal (Drive: 11 plays, 72 yards, 4:28; Montana State 3–0)
- (0:25) BUT – Beck Janki 34-yard field goal (Drive: 10 plays, 58 yards, 5:40; Tied 3–3)
- (0:11) MTST – Jabez Woods 100-yard kickoff return, Myles Sansted kick (Montana State 10–3)

Second quarter

- (4:41) MTST – Adam Jones 1-yard run, two-point conversion failed (Drive: 7 plays, 75 yards, 3:29; Montana State 16–3)
- (1:47) MTST – Justin Lamson 1 yard run, Myles Sansted kick (Drive: 5 plays, 42 yards, 1:08; Montana State 23–3)
- (0:22) MTST – Dane Steel 29-yard pass from Justin Lamson, Myles Sansted kick (Drive: 2 plays, 40 yards, 0:17; Montana State 30–3)

Third quarter

- (13:19) MTST – Taco Dowler 20-yard pass from Justin Lamson, Myles Sansted kick (Drive: 4 plays, 75 yards, 1:41; Montana State 37–3)
- (5:33) BUT – Nick Munson 3-yard pass from Gabe Passini, Beck Janki kick (Drive: 12 plays, 65 yards, 7:46; Montana State 37–10)
- (4:04) BUT – Desmin Jackson 1-yard run, Beck Janki kick (Drive: 2 plays, 25 yards, 0:49; Montana State 37–17)

Fourth quarter

- (14:19) MTST – Jared White 2-yard run, Myles Sansted kick (Drive: 10 plays, 75 yards, 4:45; Montana State 44–17)
- (6:24) MTST – Jabez Woods 35-yard pass from Patrick Duchien, Myles Sansted kick (Drive: 7 plays, 80 yards, 3:26; Montana State 51–17)
- (0:37) BUT – Jarrin Alley 1-yard run, Beck Janki kick (Drive: 13 plays, 75 yards, 5:47; Montana State 51–24)

Statistics	BUT	MTST
First downs	16	25
Plays–yards	61–273	57–498
Rushes–yards	36–83	30–166
Passing yards	190	332
Passing: comp–att–int	19–25–0	20–27–1
Turnovers	0	1
Time of possession	35:07	24:53

Team	Category	Player	Statistics
Butler	Passing	Gabe Passini	14/19, 140 yards, TD
Butler	Rushing	Michael Dellumo	10 carries, 23 yards
Butler	Receiving	Chet Yardley	3 receptions, 55 yards
Montana State	Passing	Justin Lamson	15/20, 239 yards, 2 TD
Montana State	Rushing	Adam Jones	13 carries, 77 yards, TD
Montana State	Receiving	Taco Dowler	5 receptions, 97 yards, TD

=== Franklin (IN) (DIII) ===
Franklin Grizzlies (DIII) (1–0) at Butler Bulldogs (1–1) – Game summary

Quarter	1	2	3	4	Total
Grizzlies (DIII)	0	0	0	0	0
Bulldogs	7	17	14	14	52

at Bud and Jackie Sellick Bowl • Indianapolis, Indiana

- Date: Saturday, September 12, 2026
- Game time: 6:00 p.m. EDT
- Game weather: Sunny • Temperature: 80 °F (27 °C) • Wind: W at 4 miles per hour (6.4 km/h)
- Game attendance: 3,838
- Referee: Mike Hoffman
- TV announcers (ESPN+): Josh Ayen (play-by-play), Chris Schumerth (analyst) and Eva Hallman (sideline)
- Box Score

Game information

First quarter

- (6:05) BUT – Nick Munson 11-yard run, Beck Janki kick (Drive: 9 plays, 55 yards, 4:21; Butler 7–0)

Second quarter

- (11:23) BUT – Nick Munson 29-yard pass from Gabe Passini, Beck Janki kick (Drive: 7 plays, 54 yards, 3:30; Butler 14–0)
- (5:16) BUT – Blake Matthews 29-yard pass from Gabe Passini, Beck Janki kick (Drive: 3 plays, 62 yards, 1:30; Butler 21–0)
- (0:00) BUT – Beck Janki 26-yard field goal (Drive: 8 plays, 53 yards, 1:17; Butler 24–0)

Third quarter

- (10:00) BUT – Michael Dellumo 6-yard run, Beck Janki kick (Drive: 9 plays, 63 yards, 4:53; Butler 31–0)
- (4:56) BUT – Desmin Jackson 5-yard run, Beck Janki kick (Drive: 2 plays, 33 yards, 0:29; Butler 38–0)

Fourth quarter

- (11:03) BUT – Zac Willingham-Davis 4-yard run, Beck Janki kick (Drive: 11 plays, 76 yards, 6:23; Butler 45–0)
- (1:50) BUT – Jack Linden 33-yard run, Beck Janki kick (Drive: 12 plays, 92 yards, 6:51; Butler 52–0)

Statistics	FCIN	BUT
First downs	10	28
Plays–yards	50–235	73–512
Rushes–yards	23–81	50–371
Passing yards	154	141
Passing: comp–att–int	15–27–2	17–23–0
Turnovers	5	0
Time of possession	22:37	37:23

Team	Category	Player	Statistics
Franklin (IN)	Passing	Marshall Kmiecik	14/25, 150 yards, 2 INT
Franklin (IN)	Rushing	Marshall Kmiecik	6 carries, 44 yards
Franklin (IN)	Receiving	Brayden Wilkins	5 receptions, 54 yards
Butler	Passing	Gabe Passini	14/20, 130 yards, 2 TD
Butler	Rushing	Michael Dellumo	10 carries, 79 yards, TD
Butler	Receiving	Nick Munson	2 receptions, 41 yards, TD

=== Chicago State ===
Chicago State Cougars (1–2) at Butler Bulldogs (2–1) – Game summary

Quarter	1	2	3	4	Total
Cougars	6	8	0	6	20
Bulldogs	23	7	0	17	47

at Bud and Jackie Sellick Bowl • Indianapolis, Indiana

- Date: Saturday, September 19, 2026
- Game time: 1:00 p.m. EDT
- Game weather: Mostly Cloudy • Temperature: 84 °F (29 °C) • Wind: NW at 7 miles per hour (11 km/h)
- Game attendance: 4,774
- Referee: Grant Henderson
- TV announcers (ESPN+): Andrew Mild (play-by-play) and Eva Hallman (analyst)
- Box Score

Game information

First quarter

- (12:41) BUT – Gabe Passini 9-yard run, Beck Janki kick (Drive: 2 plays, 8 yards, 0:50; Butler 7–0)
- (11:00) BUT – Chicago State fumble out of the back of the end zone (Butler 9–0)
- (10:04) BUT – Nick Munson 32-yard pass from Gabe Passini, Beck Janki kick (Drive: 2 plays, 35 yards, 0:50; Butler 16–0)
- (8:48) CHST – Chris Edmonds 74-yard run, Donovan Blair kick blocked (Drive: 3 plays, 83 yards, 1:11; Butler 16–6)
- (4:33) BUT – Drew Sullivan 16-yard pass from Gabe Passini, Beck Janki kick (Drive: 7 plays, 58 yards, 4:09; Butler 23–6)

Second quarter

- (10:32) CHST – Arshawn Powell 11-yard pass from Ashton Pannell, Jack Roland pass from Ashton Pannell (Drive: 10 plays, 67 yards, 4:16; Butler 23–14)
- (1:57) BUT – Sam Manna 1-yard run, Beck Janki kick (Drive: 8 plays, 75 yards, 2:22; Butler 30–14)

Third quarter

No scoring plays

Fourth quarter

- (12:13) BUT – Evan Windley 45-yard field goal (Drive: 7 plays, 6 yards, 3:59; Butler 33–14)
- (11:22) CHST – Chris Edmonds 77-yard pass from Ashton Pannell, two-point conversion failed (Drive: 2 plays, 79 yards, 0:45; Butler 33–20)
- (7:01) BUT – Michael Nix 14-yard pass from Gabe Passini, Beck Janki kick (Drive: 3 plays, 17 yards, 1:43; Butler 40–20)
- (5:25) BUT – Desmin Jackson 72-yard run, Beck Janki kick (Drive: 1 play, 72 yards, 0:13; Butler 47–20)

Statistics	CHST	BUT
First downs	13	15
Plays–yards	58–301	63–366
Rushes–yards	32–121	40–257
Passing yards	180	109
Passing: comp–att–int	16–26–0	12–23–0
Turnovers	3	0
Time of possession	27:32	32:28

Team	Category	Player	Statistics
Chicago State	Passing	Ashton Pannell	16/26, 180 yards, 2 TD
Chicago State	Rushing	Chris Edmonds	9 carries, 88 yards, TD
Chicago State	Receiving	Chris Edmonds	3 receptions, 74 yards, TD
Butler	Passing	Gabe Passini	12/23, 109 yards, 3 TD
Butler	Rushing	Desmin Jackson	15 carries, 164 yards, TD
Butler	Receiving	Nick Munson	3 receptions, 42 yards, TD

=== at Valparaiso (Hoosier Helmet Trophy) ===
Butler Bulldogs (3–1) at Valparaiso Beacons (1–2) – Game summary

Quarter	1	2	3	4	Total
Bulldogs	3	7	7	16	33
Beacons	7	7	7	7	28

at Brown Field • Valparaiso, Indiana

- Date: Saturday, September 26, 2026
- Game time: 2:00 p.m. EDT
- Game weather: Sunny • Temperature: 69 °F (21 °C) • Wind: E at 4 miles per hour (6.4 km/h)
- Game attendance: 2,888
- Referee: Michael Hoffman
- TV announcers (ESPN+): Todd Ickow (play-by-play) and Tom Byrne (analyst)
- Box Score

Game information

First quarter

- (12:30) BUT – Beck Janki 41-yard field goal (Drive: 4 plays, 2 yards, 0:50; Butler 3–0)
- (4:22) VAL – Rowan Keefe 3-yard run, Luke Scoma kick (Drive: 10 plays, 58 yards, 6:02; Valparaiso 7–3)

Second quarter

- (14:50) VAL – Michael Rumoro 78-yard run, Luke Scoma kick (Drive: 3 plays, 85 yards, 1:28; Valparaiso 14–3)
- (3:07) BUT – Nick Munson 35-yard pass from Gabe Passini, Beck Janki kick (Drive: 6 plays, 63 yards, 3:19; Valparaiso 14–10)

Third quarter

- (11:03) BUT – Nick Munson 40-yard pass from Gabe Passini, Beck Janki kick (Drive: 8 plays, 75 yards, 3:57; Butler 17–14)
- (3:44) VAL – Devin Yeats 7-yard pass from Rowan Keefe, Luke Scoma kick (Drive: 13 plays, 75 yards, 7:19; Valparaiso 21–17)

Fourth quarter

- (14:46) BUT – Nick Munson 14-yard pass from Gabe Passini, Beck Janki kick (Drive: 7 plays, 75 yards, 3:58; Butler 24–21)
- (6:14) BUT – Beck Janki 40-yard field goal (Drive: 9 plays, 44 yards, 4:57; Butler 27–21)
- (2:44) BUT – Desmin Jackson 17-yard run, two-point conversion failed (Drive: 4 plays, 40 yards, 2:31; Butler 33–21)
- (1:56) VAL – Micah Mackay 15-yard pass from Rowan Keefe, Luke Scoma kick (Drive: 2 plays, 14 yards, 0:34; Butler 33–28)

Statistics	BUT	VAL
First downs	19	18
Plays–yards	59–371	61–331
Rushes–yards	42–216	26–144
Passing yards	155	187
Passing: comp–att–int	9–17–0	24–35–1
Turnovers	0	1
Time of possession	31:47	28:13

Team	Category	Player	Statistics
Butler	Passing	Gabe Passini	9/17, 155 yards, 3 TD
Butler	Rushing	Gabe Passini	20 carries, 104 yards
Butler	Receiving	Nick Munson	5 receptions, 114 yards, 3 TD
Valparaiso	Passing	Rowan Keefe	24/35, 187 yards, 2 TD, INT
Valparaiso	Rushing	Michael Rumoro	8 carries, 100 yards, TD
Valparaiso	Receiving	Chris Gundy	6 receptions, 59 yards

=== San Diego ===
San Diego Toreros (2–3) at Butler Bulldogs (4–1) – Game summary

Quarter	1	2	3	4	Total
Toreros	3	0	0	7	10
Bulldogs	10	10	14	7	41

at Bud and Jackie Sellick Bowl • Indianapolis, Indiana

- Date: Saturday, October 10, 2026
- Game time: 1:00 p.m. EDT
- Game weather: Cloudy • Temperature: 71 °F (22 °C) • Wind: SE at 9 miles per hour (14 km/h)
- Game attendance: 3,909
- Referee: Jason Berg
- TV announcers (ESPN+): Greg Rakestraw (play-by-play), Shawn Shepard (analyst) and Will Hicks (sideline)
- Box Score

Game information

First quarter

- (9:53) BUT – Sam Manna 73-yard run, Beck Janki kick (Drive: 1 play, 73 yards, 0:13; Butler 7–0)
- (4:51) USD – Emiliano Salazar 44-yard field goal (Drive: 9 plays, 48 yards, 5:02; Butler 7–3)
- (1:55) BUT – Beck Janki 34-yard field goal (Drive: 5 plays, 68 yards, 2:51; Butler 10–3)

Second quarter

- (12:50) BUT – Desmin Jackson 22-yard run, Beck Janki kick (Drive: 2 plays, 49 yards, 0:40; Butler 17–3)
- (0:00) BUT – Beck Janki 34-yard field goal (Drive: 16 plays, 83 yards, 6:14; Butler 20–3)

Third quarter

- (8:50) BUT – Gabe Passini 10-yard run, Beck Janki kick (Drive: 5 plays, 80 yards, 2:58; Butler 27–3)
- (7:14) BUT – Gabe Passini 4-yard run, Beck Janki kick (Drive: 2 plays, 15 yards, 0:48; Butler 34–3)

Fourth quarter

- (13:36) USD – Omar Mbakwe 30-yard pass from Dom Nankil, Emiliano Salazar kick (Drive: 6 plays, 61 yards, 2:19; Butler 34–10)
- (10:33) BUT – Gabe Passini 9-yard run, Beck Janki kick (Drive: 5 plays, 60 yards, 3:02; Butler 41–10)

Statistics	USD	BUT
First downs	19	17
Plays–yards	69–308	53–479
Rushes–yards	27–13	36–262
Passing yards	295	217
Passing: comp–att–int	28–42–2	11–17–0
Turnovers	2	0
Time of possession	31:23	28:37

Team	Category	Player	Statistics
San Diego	Passing	Dom Nankil	28/42, 295 yards, TD, 2 INT
San Diego	Rushing	Omar Mbakwe	9 carries, 12 yards
San Diego	Receiving	Elijah Taylor	6 receptions, 100 yards
Butler	Passing	Gabe Passini	11/16, 217 yards
Butler	Rushing	Sam Manna	9 carries, 151 yards
Butler	Receiving	Michael Nix	3 receptions, 113 yards

=== Dayton ===
Dayton Flyers (4–1) at Butler Bulldogs (5–1) – Game summary

Quarter	1	2	3	4	Total
Flyers	0	14	0	5	19
Bulldogs	3	0	0	6	9

at Bud and Jackie Sellick Bowl • Indianapolis, Indiana

- Date: Saturday, October 17, 2026
- Game time: 1:00 p.m. EDT
- Game weather: Sunny • Temperature: 52 °F (11 °C) • Wind: NE at 6 miles per hour (9.7 km/h)
- Game attendance: 3,917
- Referee: John Shay
- TV announcers (ESPN+): Andrew Mild (play-by-play) and Will Hicks (analyst)
- Box Score

Game information

First quarter

- (6:25) BUT – Beck Janki 30-yard field goal (Drive: 8 plays, 61 yards, 5:16; Butler 3–0)

Second quarter

- (13:36) DAY – Bryce Cowgill 25-yard pass from Bryce Schondelmyer, David Maurer kick (Drive: 11 plays, 89 yards, 6:24; Dayton 7–3)
- (1:47) DAY – Luke Hansen 33-yard pass from Bryce Schondelmyer, David Maurer kick (Drive: 9 plays, 85 yards, 4:47; Dayton 14–3)

Third quarter

No scoring plays

Fourth quarter

- (12:18) BUT – Nick Munson 20-yard pass from Gabe Passini, two-point conversion failed (Drive: 9 plays, 79 yards, 3:57; Dayton 14–9)
- (5:14) DAY – David Maurer 21-yard field goal (Drive: 13 plays, 61 yards, 7:04; Dayton 17–9)
- (1:11) DAY – Gabe Passini sacked in the end zone (Dayton 19–9)

Statistics	DAY	BUT
First downs	17	10
Plays–yards	72–377	47–182
Rushes–yards	36–80	21–30
Passing yards	297	152
Passing: comp–att–int	28–36–0	15–26–3
Turnovers	1	3
Time of possession	38:47	21:13

Team	Category	Player	Statistics
Dayton	Passing	Bryce Schondelmyer	28/36, 297 yards, 2 TD
Dayton	Rushing	Luke Hansen	18 carries, 70 yards
Dayton	Receiving	Ethan Thulin	4 receptions, 83 yards
Butler	Passing	Gabe Passini	15/26, 152 yards, TD, 3 INT
Butler	Rushing	Desmin Jackson	7 carries, 16 yards
Butler	Receiving	Nick Munson	5 receptions, 80 yards, TD

=== at Drake ===
Butler Bulldogs (5–2) at Drake Bulldogs (2–5) – Game summary

Quarter	1	2	3	4	Total
Butler	10	7	3	13	33
Drake	14	7	0	0	21

at Drake Stadium • Des Moines, Iowa

- Date: Saturday, October 24, 2026
- Game time: 1:00 p.m. EDT
- Game weather: Sunny • Temperature: 72 °F (22 °C) • Wind: S at 9 miles per hour (14 km/h)
- Game attendance: 2,560
- Referee: Grant Henderson
- TV announcers (ESPN+): Michael Admire (play-by-play) and Justin Surrency (analyst)
- Box Score

Game information

First quarter

- (12:27) DRKE – Lincoln DeLaere 32-yard pass from Riley Warzynski, Griffin Kollhoff kick (Drive: 9 plays, 75 yards, 2:33; Drake 7–0)
- (7:14) BUT – Beck Janki 37-yard field goal (Drive: 10 plays, 45 yards, 5:13; Drake 7–3)
- (4:04) DRKE – Kavaughn Clark 7-yard run, Griffin Kollhoff kick (Drive: 8 plays, 75 yards, 3:10; Drake 14–3)
- (0:05) BUT – Luke Snyder 2-yard pass from Gabe Passini, Beck Janki kick (Drive: 7 plays, 65 yards, 3:53; Drake 14–10)

Second quarter

- (8:14) BUT – Michael Dellumo 2-yard run, Beck Janki kick (Drive: 8 plays, 80 yards, 4:36; Butler 17–14)
- (0:07) DRKE – Lucci Fidone 11-yard pass from Riley Warzynski, Griffin Kollhoff kick (Drive: 10 plays, 66 yards, 1:27; Drake 21–17)

Third quarter

- (3:34) BUT – Beck Janki 27-yard field goal (Drive: 4 plays, 4 yards, 1:37; Drake 21–20)

Fourth quarter

- (8:23) BUT – Desmin Jackson 2-yard run, two-point conversion failed (Drive: 3 plays, 35 yards, 1:33; Butler 26–21)
- (7:16) BUT – Gabe Passini 3-yard run, Beck Janki kick (Drive: 2 plays, 2 yards, 0:51; Butler 33–21)

Statistics	BUT	DRKE
First downs	19	16
Plays–yards	69–393	67–312
Rushes–yards	52–244	29–73
Passing yards	149	239
Passing: comp–att–int	7–17–1	25–38–1
Turnovers	1	2
Time of possession	38:22	21:38

Team	Category	Player	Statistics
Butler	Passing	Gabe Passini	6/16, 118 yards, TD, INT
Butler	Rushing	Desmin Jackson	17 carries, 91 yards, TD
Butler	Receiving	Drew Sullivan; Nick Munson	1 reception, 44 yards 3 receptions, 44 yards
Drake	Passing	Riley Warzynski	21/27, 200 yards, 2 TD
Drake	Rushing	Kavaughn Clark	9 carries, 39 yards, TD
Drake	Receiving	Willis Nofsinger	3 receptions, 51 yards

=== at Presbyterian ===
Butler Bulldogs (6–2) at Presbyterian Blue Hose (4–4) – Game summary

Quarter	1	2	3	4	Total
Bulldogs	14	3	7	3	27
Blue Hose	0	3	7	0	10

at Bailey Memorial Stadium • Clinton, South Carolina

- Date: Saturday, October 31, 2026
- Game time: 1:00 p.m. EDT
- Game weather: Sunny • Temperature: 64 °F (18 °C) • Wind: NE at 9 miles per hour (14 km/h)
- Game attendance: 2,435
- Referee: Jeff Page
- TV announcers (ESPN+): Gabriel Schray (play-by-play) and Tim Webb (analyst)
- Box Score

Game information

First quarter

- (7:53) BUT – Desmin Jackson 4-yard run, Beck Janki kick (Drive: 11 plays, 82 yards, 7:02; Butler 7–0)
- (2:20) BUT – Drew Sullivan 21-yard pass from Gabe Passini, Beck Janki kick (Drive: 6 plays, 47 yards, 4:27; Butler 14–0)

Second quarter

- (2:35) PRES – Kade Bailey 28-yard field goal (Drive: 7 plays, 44 yards, 2:58; Butler 14–3)
- (0:00) BUT – Evan Windley 45-yard field goal (Drive: 11 plays, 50 yards, 2:30; Butler 17–3)

Third quarter

- (4:45) BUT – Gabe Passini 19-yard run, Beck Janki kick (Drive: 12 plays, 80 yards, 7:20; Butler 24–3)
- (2:45) PRES – Eric Nelson 66-yard pass from Noah Perrin, Kade Bailey kick (Drive: 7 plays, 83 yards, 1:56; Butler 24–10)

Fourth quarter

- (3:37) BUT – Beck Janki 22-yard field goal (Drive: 11 plays, 51 yards, 5:13; Butler 27–10)

Statistics	BUT	PRES
First downs	25	14
Plays–yards	73–394	50–207
Rushes–yards	47–249	28–87
Passing yards	145	120
Passing: comp–att–int	16–26–0	10–22–0
Turnovers	0	0
Time of possession	41:30	18:30

Team	Category	Player	Statistics
Butler	Passing	Gabe Passini	16/25, 145 yards, TD
Butler	Rushing	Gabe Passini	18 carries, 162 yards, TD
Butler	Receiving	Nick Munson	7 receptions, 50 yards
Presbyterian	Passing	Noah Perrin	1/1, 66 yards, TD
Presbyterian	Rushing	Damion Moate	8 carries, 34 yards
Presbyterian	Receiving	Eric Nelson	1 reception, 66 yards, TD

=== St. Thomas (MN) ===
St. Thomas Tommies (7–2) at Butler Bulldogs (7–2) – Game summary

Quarter	1	2	3	4	Total
Tommies	7	0	7	0	14
Bulldogs	3	17	7	14	41

at Bud and Jackie Sellick Bowl • Indianapolis, Indiana

- Date: Saturday, November 7, 2026
- Game time: 1:00 p.m. EST
- Game weather: Sunny • Temperature: 47 °F (8 °C)
- Game attendance: 3,029
- Referee: Tyler Downs
- TV announcers (ESPN+): Dante Lang (play-by-play) and Will Hicks (analyst)
- Box Score

Game information

First quarter

- (8:49) BUT – Evan Windley 44-yard field goal (Drive: 10 plays, 44 yards, 6:06; Butler 3–0)
- (4:39) STMN – Nick Peipert 1-yard run, Ben Hoiland kick (Drive: 8 plays, 71 yards, 4:10; St. Thomas 7–3)

Second quarter

- (9:49) BUT – Desmin Jackson 19-yard run, Beck Janki kick (Drive: 6 plays, 57 yards, 2:52; Butler 10–7)
- (3:45) BUT – Michael Dellumo 67-yard run, Beck Janki kick (Drive: 3 plays, 75 yards, 1:26; Butler 17–7)
- (1:04) BUT – Beck Janki 32-yard field goal (Drive: 5 plays, 17 yards, 1:01; Butler 20–7)

Third quarter

- (14:11) BUT – Nick Munson 23-yard pass from Gabe Passini, Beck Janki kick (Drive: 1 play, 23 yards, 0:05; Butler 27–7)
- (2:59) STMN – Anthony Policare 9-yard run, Ben Hoiland kick (Drive: 9 plays, 77 yards, 3:57; Butler 27–14)

Fourth quarter

- (12:29) BUT – Michael Nix 29-yard pass from Gabe Passini, Beck Janki kick (Drive: 4 plays, 51 yards, 2:29; Butler 34–14)
- (9:32) BUT – Michael Dellumo 56-yard run, Beck Janki kick (Drive: 2 plays, 60 yards, 0:57; Butler 41–14)

Statistics	STMN	BUT
First downs	14	15
Plays–yards	69–276	59–388
Rushes–yards	37–77	36–253
Passing yards	199	135
Passing: comp–att–int	19–32–1	13–23–0
Turnovers	3	0
Time of possession	29:54	30:06

Team	Category	Player	Statistics
St. Thomas (MN)	Passing	Anthony Policare	15/26, 152 yards, INT
St. Thomas (MN)	Rushing	Nick Peipert	4 carries, 38 yards, TD
St. Thomas (MN)	Receiving	Quentin Cobb-Butler	6 receptions, 73 yards
Butler	Passing	Gabe Passini	13/23, 135 yards, 2 TD
Butler	Rushing	Michael Dellumo	8 carries, 143 yards, 2 TD
Butler	Receiving	Michael Nix	4 receptions, 45 yards, TD

=== at Marist ===
Butler Bulldogs (8–2) at Marist Red Foxes (5–5) – Game summary

Quarter	1	2	3	4	Total
Bulldogs	0	7	7	14	28
Red Foxes	0	0	0	0	0

at Tenney Stadium at Leonidoff Field • Poughkeepsie, New York

- Date: Saturday, November 14, 2026
- Game time: 12:00 p.m. EST
- Game weather: Cloudy • Temperature: 45 °F (7 °C) • Wind: NW at 9 miles per hour (14 km/h)
- Game attendance: 2,167
- Referee: Rob Cibotti
- TV announcers (ESPN+): Geoff Brault (play-by-play), Steve Eggink (analyst) and William Rosen (sideline)
- Box Score

Game information

First quarter

No scoring plays

Second quarter

- (14:56) BUT – Michael Dellumo 6-yard run, Beck Janki kick (Drive: 8 plays, 61 yards, 4:52; Butler 7–0)

Third quarter

- (8:49) BUT – Michael Dellumo 3-yard run, Beck Janki kick (Drive: 3 plays, 13 yards, 1:32; Butler 14–0)

Fourth quarter

- (11:45) BUT – Gabe Passini 1-yard run, Beck Janki kick (Drive: 11 plays, 56 yards, 5:44; Butler 21–0)
- (10:13) BUT – Desmin Jackson 6-yard run, Beck Janki kick (Drive: 1 play, 6 yards, 0:08; Butler 28–0)

Statistics	BUT	MRST
First downs	13	11
Plays–yards	57–233	62–193
Rushes–yards	39–123	26–52
Passing yards	110	141
Passing: comp–att–int	12–18–0	19–36–2
Turnovers	0	2
Time of possession	28:50	31:10

Team	Category	Player	Statistics
Butler	Passing	Gabe Passini	10/16, 101 yards
Butler	Rushing	Gabe Passini	14 carries, 64 yards, TD
Butler	Receiving	Nick Munson	4 receptions, 46 yards
Marist	Passing	Sonny Mannino	18/32, 138 yards, 2 INT
Marist	Rushing	Isaiah Simmons	10 carries, 36 yards
Marist	Receiving	Reed Shumpert	3 receptions, 48 yards

=== Morehead State ===
Morehead State Eagles (3–8) at Butler Bulldogs (9–2) – Game summary

Quarter	1	2	3	4	Total
Eagles	0	0	7	0	7
Bulldogs	7	0	10	7	24

at Bud and Jackie Sellick Bowl • Indianapolis, Indiana

- Date: Saturday, November 21, 2026
- Game time: 1:00 p.m. EST
- Game weather: Sunny • Temperature: 67 °F (19 °C)
- Game attendance: 3,167
- Referee: Carl Chapman
- TV announcers (ESPN+): Greg Rakestraw (play-by-play) and Will Hicks (analyst)
- Box Score

Game information

First quarter

- (4:05) BUT – Michael Dellumo 35-yard pass from Gabe Passini, Beck Janki kick (Drive: 8 plays, 70 yards, 4:46; Butler 7–0)

Second quarter

No scoring plays

Third quarter

- (12:03) BUT – Michael Dellumo 7-yard run, Beck Janki kick (Drive: 7 plays, 66 yards, 2:54; Butler 14–0)
- (3:58) BUT – Evan Windley 48-yard field goal (Drive: 7 plays, 15 yards, 3:17; Butler 17–0)
- (1:23) MORE – Riley Purcell 43-yard pass from David Parsons, Jordan Price kick (Drive: 5 plays, 75 yards, 2:35; Butler 17–7)

Fourth quarter

- (13:47) BUT – Desmin Jackson 20-yard run, Beck Janki kick (Drive: 6 plays, 64 yards, 2:32; Butler 24–7)

Statistics	MORE	BUT
First downs	16	19
Plays–yards	58–250	63–343
Rushes–yards	21–12	45–239
Passing yards	238	104
Passing: comp–att–int	22–37–2	6–18–0
Turnovers	2	0
Time of possession	26:39	33:21

Team	Category	Player	Statistics
Morehead State	Passing	David Parsons	22/37, 238 yards, TD, 2 INT
Morehead State	Rushing	Blake Fisher	10 carries, 12 yards
Morehead State	Receiving	Riley Purcell	3 receptions, 66 yards, TD
Butler	Passing	Gabe Passini	5/15, 87 yards, TD
Butler	Rushing	Desmin Jackson	20 carries, 121 yards, TD
Butler	Receiving	Michael Dellumo	1 reception, 35 yards, TD
