= Turnover on downs =

Gridiron football term

In gridiron football, a turnover on downs occurs when a team's offense has used all its downs but fails to advance the ball enough to earn another set of downs. The resulting turnover gives possession of the ball to the team on defense.

== Background ==
A football team has four plays (downs) (three in Canadian football) to advance the ball at least ten yards or to score. Any ground gained during each down short of these ten yards is kept, and any ground lost must be regained in addition to the ten yards. Thus, if a team gains four yards on first down, it then has three more downs to gain the six remaining yards; if a team loses four yards on first down, it must gain a total of fourteen yards over the next three downs.

If a team gains the required ten yards, it becomes first down and the team receives another four downs to gain another ten yards or cross the goal line for a score. Otherwise, the result of the final down includes turning possession of the ball over to the team that had been on defense.

== Strategy ==
If a team reaches its final down, then rather than risk a turnover on downs, it usually concedes that the drive has ended and executes one of the following plays:

- If close enough to the goal posts (typically, within 40 yards), it attempts to kick a field goal to score points.
- Otherwise, it punts the ball, conceding possession to the defense but trying to give the defense a less advantageous field position.

=== Reasons for not kicking on final down ===
In some instances, a team may elect to use its final down to try to gain the yardage, rather than punt or kick a field goal. This is referred to as "going for it" (or "sticking" as opposed to "kicking"). The risk is that, if the play fails, the opposing team takes possession of the ball at a more advantageous field position than it would after a punt. Factors that may lead to a team making this choice are:

- Going for it seems more likely to succeed because only a small distance is needed to gain a first down or score a touchdown.
- Punting/kicking seems less likely to succeed because of the weather or the quality of the kicker.
- A team not quite within field goal range believes that the advantage of punting is not substantial (including the risk of kicking a touchback).
- A team plans to use the down to trick or surprise the defense:
  - With a trick play: Set up to punt or kick a field goal but go for yardage instead.
  - By inducing the defense to commit a foul (such as by executing a long snap count that makes a defensive player jump offside), where the penalty reduces the yardage needed for first down, or results in a first down.
  - By simply doing the opposite of what the defense expects.
- A mishap on a kicking play (bad snap, fumble, or blocked kick that the offense recovers) forces the offense to abandon the kicking play and try for yardage.

Near the end of the game, the score of the game becomes more relevant to the decision to go for it:

- A team is leading but wants to score additional points to prevent the opposing team from coming back to tie or win the game. (In some leagues, points scored or point differential is a tiebreaker for playoff seeding.)
- A team is leading and wants to retain possession to take more time off the clock.
- A team is trailing and believes that, if it surrenders possession of the ball, it might not get another possession.
- A team is trailing by so much that scoring a field goal would not substantially improve its situation.
- A team is in field goal range but is trailing such that a field goal would not tie or win the game, but a touchdown would. (In overtime in the NFL, the first team to possess the ball cannot end the game with a field goal but can with a touchdown.)

If there is only time left on the clock for a single play (in either half), there are no long-term considerations. The offense typically executes a Hail Mary pass or a series of lateral passes. A team that is leading at the end of the second half, or either team at the end of the first half, may have the quarterback kneel to end the half with minimum chance for mishap.

=== Notable strategy ===
High-school coach Kevin Kelley, the former head coach at Pulaski Academy in Little Rock, Arkansas, achieved national notoriety for his absolute refusal to punt, regardless of field position. He led the school to multiple state championships with a heavily analytics-driven strategy. After becoming Pulaski's head coach in 2003, he ran across a research paper by a Harvard professor who argued that punting made no mathematical sense. Kelley responded by initially reducing punting to less than twice per game, and soon eliminating it altogether.

== Statistics ==
In the National Football League, turnovers on downs do not count as turnovers in statistics for either team; turnover statistics tally turnovers that occur during a play — namely, fumble recoveries and interceptions.

== In other sports ==
In rugby union, a turnover can occur after any tackle because the defense can contest for possession of the ball. However, in rugby league, the defense cannot contest for possession of the ball; the ball is turned over after the sixth tackle, comparable to the turnover on downs in gridiron football. The attacking team usually punts before the sixth tackle so the defending team starts its attack as far downfield as possible.

== See also ==
- Glossary of American football
