= 2021 Presbyterian Blue Hose football team =

American college football season

2021 Presbyterian Blue Hose football
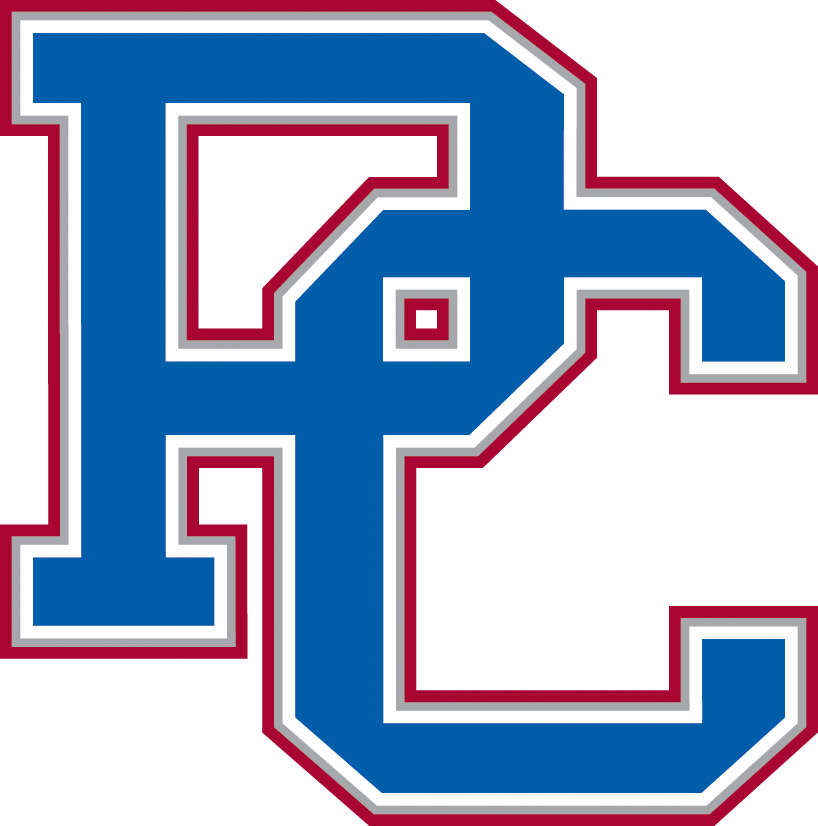
- Conference: Pioneer Football League
- Record: 2–9 (0–8 PFL)
- Head coach: Kevin Kelley (1st season)
- Offensive coordinator: Joey Orck (9th season)
- Defensive coordinator: Jeff Imamura (1st season)
- Home stadium: Bailey Memorial Stadium

2021 Pioneer Football League standings
	Conf.			Overall
Team	W		L	W		L
Davidson +^	7	–	1	8	–	3
San Diego +	7	–	1	7	–	4
St. Thomas (MN) *	6	–	2	7	–	3
Morehead State	6	–	2	7	–	4
Marist	5	–	3	5	–	5
Dayton	5	–	3	6	–	4
Valparaiso	4	–	4	4	–	7
Stetson	2	–	6	4	–	7
Drake	1	–	7	2	–	9
Butler	1	–	7	3	–	8
Presbyterian	0	–	8	2	–	9
+ – Conference co-champions; ^ – FCS playoff participant; * – St. Thomas (MN) ineligible for FCS postseason play due to transition from NCAA Division III

The 2021 Presbyterian Blue Hose football team represented Presbyterian College in the 2021 NCAA Division I FCS football season as a member of the Pioneer Football League (PFL). Led by first-year head coach Kevin Kelley, the Blue Hose played home games at Bailey Memorial Stadium. The team earned national notoriety for never punting.

== Schedule ==
Date	Time	Opponent	Site	TV	Result	Attendance
September 4	4:00 p.m.	St. Andrews*	Bailey Memorial Stadium; Clinton, SC	ESPN+	W 84–43	3,238
September 11	4:00 p.m.	Fort Lauderdale*	Bailey Memorial Stadium; Clinton, SC	ESPN+	W 68–3	1,647
September 18	6:00 p.m.	at Campbell*	Barker–Lane Stadium; Buies Creek, NC	ESPN+	L 0–72	4,978
September 25	1:00 p.m.	at Dayton	Welcome Stadium; Dayton, OH	Facebook	L 43–63	4,766
October 9	1:00 p.m.	Morehead State	Bailey Memorial Stadium; Clinton, SC	ESPN+	L 30–38	2,118
October 16	7:00 p.m.	at Davidson	Richardson Stadium; Davidson, NC		L 35–70	0
October 23	1:00 p.m.	San Diego	Bailey Memorial Stadium; Clinton, SC	ESPN+	L 28–69	3,561
October 30	1:00 p.m.	Stetson	Bailey Memorial Stadium; Clinton, SC	ESPN+	L 14–56	1,762
November 6	2:00 p.m.	at Valparaiso	Brown Field; Valparaiso, IN	ESPN3	L 55–65	1,223
November 13	1:00 p.m.	Marist	Bailey Memorial Stadium; Clinton, SC	ESPN+	L 32–57	1,778
November 20	2:00 p.m.	at St. Thomas (MN)	O'Shaughnessy Stadium; St. Paul, MN		L 15–54	3,245
*Non-conference game; Rankings from STATS Poll released prior to the game; All times are in Eastern time

== Game summaries ==
=== St. Andrews ===
In the opening game of the season against St. Andrews, Presbyterian quarterback Ren Hefley threw for an FCS single-game record 10 touchdowns in the 84–43 win. He completed 38 of 50 pass attempts and threw for 538 yards. Hefley broke the record of nine in a game, which was held by Willie Totten (Mississippi Valley State vs. Kentucky State in 1984) and Drew Hubel (Portland State vs. Weber State in 2007). Blue Hose backup quarterback Tyler Huff added two touchdown passes to set a new Division I team record (for both FCS and FBS) of 12.

Other records broken during this game include:

- Hefley's 10 touchdowns totaling 538 yards and his 38 completions were both Presbyterian Division I era records
- Wide receiver Jalyn Witcher's three touchdowns tied a Presbyterian Division I record for most receiving scores in a game
- The 621 total passing yards ranks second as a team in the Division I era (behind 648 against North Greenville)
- Presbyterian put up 56 points in the first half alone, which is a program record
- Presbyterian's 84 points broke a Division I program record

Statistics	SA	PRES
First downs	17	35
Plays–yards	69–315	94–814
Rushes–yards	49–216	33–193
Passing yards	99	621
Passing: Comp–Att–Int	9–20–0	47–61–0
Time of possession	28:53	31:07

Team	Category	Player	Statistics
St. Andrews	Passing	Andrew Fowler	9/20, 99 yards, 1 TD
St. Andrews	Rushing	D'Vonte Allen	7 carries, 86 yards, 2 TD
St. Andrews	Receiving	Kashard Cohens	5 receptions, 61 yards, 1 TD
Presbyterian	Passing	Ren Hefley	38/50, 538 yards, 10 TD
Presbyterian	Rushing	Delvecchio Powell II	10 carries, 56 yards
Presbyterian	Receiving	Jalyn Witcher	5 receptions, 156 yards, 3 TD

	1	2	3	4	Total
Knights	14	15	14	0	43
Blue Hose	28	28	14	14	84

=== Fort Lauderdale ===
Statistics	UFTL	PRES
First downs	14	30
Plays–yards	70–188	78–635
Rushes–yards	30–40	31–189
Passing yards	148	446
Passing: Comp–Att–Int	14–42–4	34–47–2
Time of possession	29:58	30:02

Team	Category	Player	Statistics
Fort Lauderdale	Passing	Franco De Luca	9/24, 101 yards, 3 INT
Fort Lauderdale	Rushing	Qmac Quiteh	8 carries, 35 yards
Fort Lauderdale	Receiving	Zach Hall	2 receptions, 42 yards
Presbyterian	Passing	Ren Hefley	22/35, 309 yards, 4 TD, 2 INT
Presbyterian	Rushing	Delvecchio Powell II	8 carries, 73 yards
Presbyterian	Receiving	Kiaran Turner	3 receptions, 100 yards, 2 TD

	1	2	3	4	Total
Eagles	3	0	0	0	3
Blue Hose	22	18	7	21	68

=== At Campbell ===
Statistics	PRES	CAMP
First downs	13	23
Plays–yards	70–220	80–580
Rushes–yards	27–37	45–156
Passing yards	183	424
Passing: comp–att–int	21–43–7	26–35–0
Time of possession	25:47	34:13

Team	Category	Player	Statistics
Presbyterian	Passing	Ren Hefley	20/39, 145 yards, 6 INT
Presbyterian	Rushing	Delvecchio Powell II	10 carries, 51 yards
Presbyterian	Receiving	Matthew Rivera	7 receptions, 100 yards
Campbell	Passing	Wiley Hartley	22/30, 342 yards, 6 TDs
Campbell	Rushing	Michael Jamerson	22 carries, 101 yards, 2 TD
Campbell	Receiving	Austin Hite	5 receptions, 93 yards, 1 TD

	1	2	3	4	Total
Blue Hose	0	0	0	0	0
Fighting Camels	21	28	9	14	72

=== At Dayton ===
Statistics	PRES	DAY
First downs	27	24
Plays–yards	93–568	78–484
Rushes–yards	31–125	44–222
Passing yards	443	262
Passing: comp–att–int	34–63–2	19–35–0
Time of possession	28:41	31:19

Team	Category	Player	Statistics
Presbyterian	Passing	Ren Hefley	34/63, 443 yards, 3 TD, 2 INT
Presbyterian	Rushing	Delvecchio Powell II	16 carries, 131 yards, 2 TD
Presbyterian	Receiving	Jalyn Witcher	11 receptions, 136 yards, 2 TD
Dayton	Passing	Jack Cook	19/35, 262 yards, 3 TD
Dayton	Rushing	Jack Cook	10 carries, 74 yards, 3 TD
Dayton	Receiving	Tyler Mintz	4 receptions, 58 yards, 1 TD

	1	2	3	4	Total
Blue Hose	23	0	7	13	43
Flyers	7	28	28	0	63

=== Morehead State ===
Statistics	MORE	PRES
First downs	21	30
Plays–yards	75–443	105–611
Rushes–yards	28–130	27–60
Passing yards	313	551
Passing: comp–att–int	26–47–1	50–80–3
Time of possession	23:16	36:44

Team	Category	Player	Statistics
Morehead State	Passing	Mark Pappas	26/46, 313 yards, 2 TD, 1 INT
Morehead State	Rushing	Issiah Aguero	16 carries, 113 yards, 2 TD
Morehead State	Receiving	Jeremiah Scott	5 receptions, 83 yards
Presbyterian	Passing	Ren Hefley	50/80, 551 yards, 4 TD, 3 INT
Presbyterian	Rushing	Delvecchio Powell II	10 carries, 45 yards
Presbyterian	Receiving	Jalyn Witcher	12 receptions, 178 yards, 2 TD

	1	2	3	4	Total
Eagles	17	7	0	14	38
Blue Hose	0	6	8	16	30

=== At Davidson ===
Statistics	PRES	DAV
First downs	29	22
Plays–yards	99–524	54–502
Rushes–yards	38–197	42–351
Passing yards	327	151
Passing: comp–att–int	35–61–2	8–12–1
Time of possession	35:56	24:04

Team	Category	Player	Statistics
Presbyterian	Passing	Ren Hefley	32/56, 298 yards, 2 TD, 2 INT
Presbyterian	Rushing	Delvecchio Powell II	10 carries, 85 yards, 1 TD
Presbyterian	Receiving	Jalyn Witcher	8 receptions, 106 yards, 1 TD
Davidson	Passing	Louis Colosimo	8/10, 151 yards, 3 TD
Davidson	Rushing	Louis Colosimo	3 carries, 95 yards, 1 TD
Davidson	Receiving	Jackson Sherrard	2 receptions, 91 yards, 2 TD

	1	2	3	4	Total
Blue Hose	8	14	0	13	35
Wildcats	7	28	21	14	70

=== San Diego ===
Statistics	USD	PRES
First downs		
Plays–yards	–	–
Rushes–yards	–	–
Passing yards		
Passing: comp–att–int	––	––
Time of possession		

Team	Category	Player	Statistics
San Diego	Passing		
San Diego	Rushing		
San Diego	Receiving		
Presbyterian	Passing		
Presbyterian	Rushing		
Presbyterian	Receiving		

	1	2	3	4	Total
Toreros					0
Blue Hose					0

=== Stetson ===
Statistics	STET	PRES
First downs		
Plays–yards	–	–
Rushes–yards	–	–
Passing yards		
Passing: comp–att–int	––	––
Time of possession		

Team	Category	Player	Statistics
Stetson	Passing		
Stetson	Rushing		
Stetson	Receiving		
Presbyterian	Passing		
Presbyterian	Rushing		
Presbyterian	Receiving		

	1	2	3	4	Total
Hatters					0
Blue Hose					0

=== At Valparaiso ===
Statistics	PRES	VALPO
First downs		
Plays–yards	–	–
Rushes–yards	–	–
Passing yards		
Passing: comp–att–int	––	––
Time of possession		

Team	Category	Player	Statistics
Presbyterian	Passing		
Presbyterian	Rushing		
Presbyterian	Receiving		
Valparaiso	Passing		
Valparaiso	Rushing		
Valparaiso	Receiving		

	1	2	3	4	Total
Blue Hose					0
Beacons					0

=== Marist ===
Statistics	MAR	PRES
First downs		
Plays–yards	–	–
Rushes–yards	–	–
Passing yards		
Passing: comp–att–int	––	––
Time of possession		

Team	Category	Player	Statistics
Marist	Passing		
Marist	Rushing		
Marist	Receiving		
Presbyterian	Passing		
Presbyterian	Rushing		
Presbyterian	Receiving		

	1	2	3	4	Total
Red Foxes					0
Blue Hose					0

=== At St. Thomas ===
Statistics	PRES	STU
First downs		
Plays–yards	–	–
Rushes–yards	–	–
Passing yards		
Passing: comp–att–int	––	––
Time of possession		

Team	Category	Player	Statistics
Presbyterian	Passing		
Presbyterian	Rushing		
Presbyterian	Receiving		
St. Thomas	Passing		
St. Thomas	Rushing		
St. Thomas	Receiving		

	1	2	3	4	Total
Blue Hose					0
Tommies					0
