= 2021 Davidson Wildcats football team =

American college football season

2021 Davidson Wildcats football

PFL co-champion

NCAA Division I First Round, L 21–48 vs. Kennesaw State
- Conference: Pioneer Football League
- Record: 8–3 (7–1 PFL)
- Head coach: Scott Abell (4th season)
- Defensive coordinator: Jon Berlin (4th season)
- Home stadium: Richardson Stadium

2021 Pioneer Football League standings
| | Conf. | | | Overall |
| Team | W | | L | W | | L |
|---|---|---|---|---|---|---|
| Davidson +^ | 7 | – | 1 | 8 | – | 3 |
| San Diego + | 7 | – | 1 | 7 | – | 4 |
| St. Thomas (MN) * | 6 | – | 2 | 7 | – | 3 |
| Morehead State | 6 | – | 2 | 7 | – | 4 |
| Marist | 5 | – | 3 | 5 | – | 5 |
| Dayton | 5 | – | 3 | 6 | – | 4 |
| Valparaiso | 4 | – | 4 | 4 | – | 7 |
| Stetson | 2 | – | 6 | 4 | – | 7 |
| Drake | 1 | – | 7 | 2 | – | 9 |
| Butler | 1 | – | 7 | 3 | – | 8 |
| Presbyterian | 0 | – | 8 | 2 | – | 9 |
+ – Conference co-champions; ^ – FCS playoff participant; * – St. Thomas (MN) ineligible for FCS postseason play due to transition from NCAA Division III

The 2021 Davidson Wildcats football team represented Davidson College in the 2021 NCAA Division I FCS football season as a member of the Pioneer Football League. They were led by fourth-year head coach Scott Abell and played their home games at Richardson Stadium.

== Schedule ==
| Date | Time | Opponent | Site | TV | Result | Attendance |
|---|---|---|---|---|---|---|
| September 4 | 1:30 p.m. | at No. 17 VMI* | Alumni Memorial Field; Lexington, VA | ESPN+ | L 24–45 | 5,009 |
| September 11 | 7:00 p.m. | Shaw* | Richardson Stadium; Davidson, NC | | W 28–26 | 4,264 |
| September 25 | 1:00 p.m. | San Diego | Richardson Stadium; Davidson, NC | | W 28–16 | 4,021 |
| October 2 | 1:00 p.m. | at Stetson | Spec Martin Stadium; DeLand, FL | | W 35–28 | 1,011 |
| October 16 | 7:00 p.m. | Presbyterian | Richardson Stadium; Davidson, NC | | W 70–35 | 4,723 |
| October 23 | 1:00 p.m. | at Butler | Bud and Jackie Sellick Bowl; Indianapolis, IN | | W 49–35 | 2,586 |
| October 30 | 1:00 p.m. | at Morehead State | Jayne Stadium; Morehead, KY | ESPN3 | W 29–22 | 6,683 |
| November 6 | 1:00 p.m. | St. Thomas (MN) | Richardson Stadium; Davidson, NC | | W 42–15 | 3,912 |
| November 13 | 1:00 p.m. | at Dayton | Welcome Stadium; Dayton, OH | | L 29–38 | 2,233 |
| November 20 | 1:00 p.m. | Drake | Richardson Stadium; Davidson, NC | | W 45–14 | 4,207 |
| November 27 | 2:00 p.m. | at No. 10 Kennesaw State* | Fifth Third Bank Stadium; Kennesaw, GA (NCAA Division I First Round) | ESPN+ | L 21–48 | 2,764 |
*Non-conference game; Rankings from STATS Poll released prior to the game; All times are in Eastern time
