= 2021 Drake Bulldogs football team =

American college football season

2021 Drake Bulldogs football
- Conference: Pioneer Football League
- Record: 2–9 (1–7 PFL)
- Head coach: Todd Stepsis (3rd season)
- Offensive coordinator: Kirk Wherritt (2nd season)
- Defensive coordinator: Allen Smith (3rd season)
- Co-defensive coordinator: Willie Cashmore (3rd season)
- Home stadium: Drake Stadium

Uniform
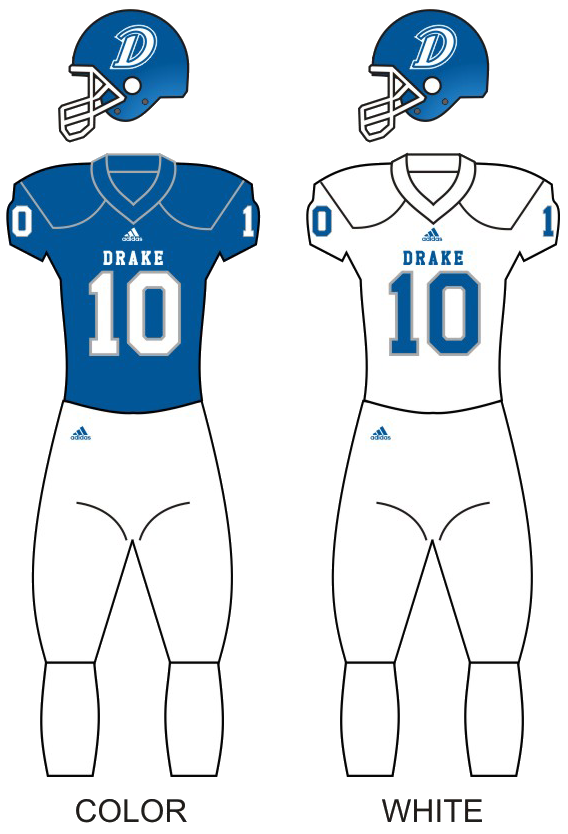

2021 Pioneer Football League standings
	Conf.			Overall
Team	W		L	W		L
Davidson +^	7	–	1	8	–	3
San Diego +	7	–	1	7	–	4
St. Thomas (MN) *	6	–	2	7	–	3
Morehead State	6	–	2	7	–	4
Marist	5	–	3	5	–	5
Dayton	5	–	3	6	–	4
Valparaiso	4	–	4	4	–	7
Stetson	2	–	6	4	–	7
Drake	1	–	7	2	–	9
Butler	1	–	7	3	–	8
Presbyterian	0	–	8	2	–	9
+ – Conference co-champions; ^ – FCS playoff participant; * – St. Thomas (MN) ineligible for FCS postseason play due to transition from NCAA Division III

The 2021 Drake Bulldogs football team represented Drake University as a member of the Pioneer Football League (PFL) during 2021 NCAA Division I FCS football season. Led by third-year head coach Todd Stepsis, the Bulldogs compiled an overall record of 2–9 with a mark of 1–7 in conference play, tying for ninth place in the PFL. The team played its home games at Drake Stadium in Des Moines, Iowa.

== Preseason ==
The Pioneer League released their preseason coaches' poll on July 27. The Bulldogs were picked to finish in third place.

Predicted finish	Team	Votes (1st place)
1	Davidson	97 (8)
2	San Diego	93 (3)
3	Drake	67
4	Dayton	62
5	Presbyterian	59
6	Valparaiso	55
7	Morehead State	51
8	St. Thomas	36
9	Marist	35
9	Stetson	35
11	Butler	15

== Schedule ==
Date	Time	Opponent	Site	TV	Result	Attendance
September 2	6:00 p.m.	West Virginia Wesleyan*	Drake Stadium; Des Moines, IA	ESPN3	W 45–3	2,671
September 11	7:00 p.m.	at No. 11 Montana State*	Bobcat Stadium; Bozeman, MT	ESPN+	L 7–45	19,797
September 18	4:00 p.m.	at No. 11 North Dakota*	Alerus Center; Grand Forks, ND (Potato Bowl USA)	ESPN+	L 0–38	10,143
September 25	12:00 p.m.	Valparaiso^{†}	Drake Stadium; Des Moines, IA	ESPN3	L 21–24	6,039
October 2	11:00 a.m.	at Butler	Bud and Jackie Sellick Bowl; Indianapolis, IN	YouTube	W 6–3	3,398
October 9	12:00 p.m.	Dayton	Drake Stadium; Des Moines, IA (rivalry)	ESPN3	L 10–28	2,116
October 16	4:00 p.m.	at San Diego	Torero Stadium; San Diego, CA	Stadium	L 10–13	3,358
October 23	12:00 pm	Stetson	Drake Stadium; Des Moines, IA	ESPN3	L 0–2 (forfeit) (Note: The Pioneer Football League canceled the game scheduled due to COVID-19 issues within Drake's program and the game will be declared a forfeit for the purposes of PFL standings. However, the NCAA regards the game as a no-contest for both teams.)	0
November 6	11:00 a.m.	at Marist	Tenney Stadium at Leonidoff Field; Poughkeepsie, NY	ESPN3	L 0–7	1,357
November 13	12:00 p.m.	St. Thomas (MN)	Drake Stadium; Des Moines, IA	ESPN3	L 14–21	1,878
November 20	12:00 p.m.	at Davidson	Richardson Stadium; Davidson, NC	Davidson Network	L 14-45	4,207
*Non-conference game; ^{†}Homecoming; Rankings from STATS Poll released prior to the game; All times are in Central time

== Game summaries ==
=== Vs. West Virginia Wesleyan ===
West Virginia Wesleyan Bobcats (0–1) vs. Drake Bulldogs (1–0)

Quarter	1	2	3	4	Total
West Virginia Wesleyan	0	0	0	3	3
Drake	21	14	10	0	45

at Drake Stadium • Des Moines, IA

- Date: Thursday, September 2, 2021
- Game time: 6:00 p.m. CDT
- Game weather: cloudy, wind SE 14mp • Temperature: 74°F
- Game attendance: 2,671
- Referee: Michael Hoffman
- TV: ESPN3

Game information

First Quarter

- (10:16) DU – Caden Meis 1 Yd Run (Nathan De Bruin Kick) (Drive: 7 plays, 48 yards, 3:11; DU 7–0)
- (10:16) DU – Cross Robinson 3 Yd Run (Nathan De Bruin Kick) (Drive: 6 plays, 49 yards, 2:53; DU 14–0)
- (0:38) DU – Ian Corwin 1 Yd Run (Nathan De Bruin Kick) (Drive: 8 plays, 45 yards, 4:09; DU 21–0)

Second Quarter

- (4:41) DU – Ian Corwin 28 Yd Run (Nathan De Bruin Kick) (Drive: 7 plays, 59 yards, 3:01; DU 28–0)
- (1:20) DU – Colin Howard 79 Yd pass from Ian Corwin (Nathan De Bruin Kick) (Drive: 4 plays, 99 yards, 1:40; DU 35–0)

Third Quarter

- (12:17) DU – Brandon Langdok 9 Yd pass from Luke Bailey (Nathan De Bruin Kick) (Drive: 5 plays, 65 yards, 2:34; DU 42–0)
- (0:27) DU – Nathan De Bruin Kick 23 Yd Field Goal (Drive: 6 plays, 44 yards, 3:28; DU 45–0)

Fourth Quarter

- (10:57) WVWU – Liam Depp 21 Yd Field Goal (Drive: 13 plays, 80 yards, 4:25; DU 45–3)

Statistics	WVWU	DU
First downs	10	21
Total yards	179	529
Rushes/yards	25/43	54/304
Passing yards	136	225
Passing: Comp–Att–Int	10–28–1	12–15–0
Time of possession	22:16	37:44

Team	Category	Player	Statistics
West Virginia Wesleyan	Passing	Nathan Payne	9–26, 129 YDS, 1 INT, 0 TD
West Virginia Wesleyan	Rushing	Mason Brubeck	8 CAR, 31 YDS, 0 TD
West Virginia Wesleyan	Receiving	Dariuse Cooper	3 REC, 52 YDS, 0 TD
Drake	Passing	Ian Corwin	8–11, 203 YDS, 0 INT, 1 TD
Drake	Rushing	Cross Robinson	13 CAR, 100 YDS, 1 TD
Drake	Receiving	Colin Howard	2 REC, 87 YDS, 1 TD

=== At #11 Montana State ===
Drake Bulldogs (1–1) vs. #11 Montana State Bobcats (1–1)

Quarter	1	2	3	4	Total
Drake	0	7	0	0	7
# 11 Montana State	9	15	7	14	45

at Bobcat Stadium • Bozeman, MT

- Date: Saturday, September 11, 2021
- Game time: 7:00 p.m. CDT
- Game weather: sunny, wind 12mp • Temperature: 70°F
- Game attendance: 19,797
- Referee: Gregg Wilson
- TV: ESPN+

Game information

First Quarter

- (11:06) MSU – Blake Glessner 29 Yd Field Goal (Drive: 5 plays, 18 yards, 2:31; MSU 3–0)
- (0:00) MSU – Willie Patterson 23 Yd pass from Matthew McKay (Blake Glessner PAT blocked) (Drive: 11 plays, 85 yards, 4:53; MSU 9–0)

Second Quarter

- (8:09) MSU – Willie Patterson 31 Yd pass from Matthew McKay (Blake Glessner Kick) (Drive: 5 plays, 40 yards, 1:42; MSU 16–0)
- (2:48) MSU – Isaiah Ifanse 4 Yd Run (Matthew McKay pass to Bryce Leighton for Two-Point Conversion) (Drive: 9 plays, 68 yards, 4:16; MSU 24–0)
- (0:11) DU – Cross Robinson 2 Yd pass from Ian Corwin (Nathan De Bruin kick) (Drive: 13 plays, 75 yards, 2:37; MSU 24–7)

Third Quarter

- (8:09) MSU – Lance McCutcheon 45 Yd pass from Matthew McKay (Blake Glessner Kick) (Drive: 1 play, 45 yards, 0:08; MSU 31–7)

Fourth Quarter

- (12:57) MSU – Ryan Davis 0 Yd Fumble Return (Blake Glessner Kick) (Drive: 11 plays, 75 yards, 4:55; MSU 38–7)
- (6:58) MSU – Cameron Gardner 28 Yd pass from Tucker Rovig (Blake Glessner Kick) (Drive: 9 plays, 54 yards, 3:24; MSU 45–7)

Statistics	DU	MSU
First downs	14	23
Total yards	228	435
Rushes/yards	36/79	37/149
Passing yards	149	286
Passing: Comp–Att–Int	14–24–0	21–29–0
Time of possession	30:24	29:36

Team	Category	Player	Statistics
Drake	Passing	Ian Corwin	14–23, 149 YDS, 0 INT, 1 TD
Drake	Rushing	Cross Robinson	9 CAR, 37 YDS, 0 TD
Drake	Receiving	Colin Howard	3 REC, 66 YDS, 0 TD
Montana State	Passing	Matthew McKay	19–25, 256 YDS, 0 INT, 3 TD
Montana State	Rushing	Isaiah Ifanse	19 CAR, 60 YDS, 1 TD
Montana State	Receiving	Lance McCutcheon	7 REC, 121 YDS, 1 TD

=== At #11 North Dakota (Potato Bowl USA) ===
Drake Bulldogs (1–2) vs. #11 North Dakota Fighting Hawks (2–1) • 2021 Potato Bowl USA

Quarter	1	2	3	4	Total
Drake	0	0	0	0	0
#11 North Dakota	14	10	7	7	38

at Alerus Center • Grand Forks, ND • 2021 Potato Bowl USA

- Date: Saturday, September 18, 2021
- Game time: 4:00 p.m. CDT
- Game weather: Dome • Temperature: 72°F
- Game attendance: 10,143
- Referee: Matt Gallagher
- TV: ESPN+

Game information

First Quarter

- (6:06) UND – Luke Skokna 51 Yd Run (Adam Stage Kick) (Drive: 3 plays, 60 yards, 1:24; UND 7–0)
- (1:43) UND – Bo Belquist 8 Yd pass from Tommy Schuster (Adam Stage Kick) (Drive: 4 plays, 56 yards, 1:01; UND 14–0)

Second Quarter

- (09:16) UND – Adam Stage 21 Yd Field Goal (Drive: 12 plays, 66 yards, 5:28; UND 17–0)
- (1:39) UND – Isaiah Smith 4 Yd Run (Adam Stage Kick) (Drive: 7 plays, 41 yards, 2:49; UND 24–0)

Third Quarter

- (6:50) UND – Brock Boltmann 9 Yd pass from Tommy Schuster (Adam Stage Kick) (Drive: 11 plays, 67 yards, 5:57; UND 31–0)

Fourth Quarter

- (6:18) UND – Austin Clemetson 5 Yd Run (Adam Stage Kick) (Drive: 1 play, 5 yards, 0:04; UND 38–0)

Statistics	DU	UND
First downs	6	24
Total yards	163	527
Rushes/yards	30/77	34/288
Passing yards	86	239
Passing: Comp–Att–Int	15–28–3	25–40–1
Time of possession	28:18	31:42

Team	Category	Player	Statistics
Drake	Passing	Luke Bailey	9–15, 58 YDS, 2 INT, 0 TD
Drake	Rushing	Cross Robinson	11 CAR, 39 YDS, 0 TD
Drake	Receiving	Colin Howard	2 REC, 39 YDS, 0 TD
North Dakota	Passing	Tommy Schuster	23–36, 234 YDS, 1 INT, 2 TD
North Dakota	Rushing	Isaiah Smith	12 CAR, 125 YDS, 1 TD
North Dakota	Receiving	Jack Wright	3 REC, 53 YDS, 0 TD

=== Vs. Valparaiso ===
Valparaiso Beacons (1–3) vs. Drake Bulldogs (1–3)

Quarter	1	2	3	4	Total
Valparaiso	14	0	3	7	24
Drake	7	7	0	7	21

at Drake Stadium • Des Moines, IA • Homecoming

- Date: Saturday, September 25, 2021
- Game time: 12:00 p.m. CST
- Game weather: sunny, wind W 14mp • Temperature: 72°F
- Game attendance: 6,039
- Referee: Mike Packard
- TV: ESPN3

Game information

First Quarter

- (13:59) DU – Brandon Langdok 8 Yd Run (Nathan De Bruin Kick) (Drive: 2 plays, 11 yards, 0:44; DU 7–0)
- (9:00) VU – Robert Washington 10 Yd Run (Brian Bartholomew Kick) (Drive: 11 plays, 84 yards, 4:54; Tied 7–7)
- (2:14) VU – Robert Washington 80 Yd Run (Brian Bartholomew Kick) (Drive: 1 plays, 80 yards, 0:16; VU 14–7)

Second Quarter

- (3:37) DU – Matt Hartlieb 18 Yd pass from Luke Bailey (Nathan De Bruin Kick) (Drive: 3 plays, 21 yards, 1:00; Tied 14–14)

Third Quarter

- (9:36) VU – Brian Bartholomew 39 Yd Field Goal (Drive: 9 plays, 34 yards, 3:56; VU 17–14)

Fourth Quarter

- (12:10) DU – Colin Howard 49 Yd pass from Luke Bailey (Nathan De Bruin Kick) (Drive: 7 plays, 85 yards, 3:48; DU 21–17)
- (1:05) VU – Jordan Bingham 30 Yd pass from Ben Nimz (Brian Bartholomew Kick) (Drive: 9 plays, 80 yards, 1:34; VU 24–21)

Statistics	VU	DU
First downs	17	17
Total yards	379	350
Rushes/yards	26/155	33/67
Passing yards	224	283
Passing: Comp–Att–Int	19–40–3	28–49–0
Time of possession	25:38	34:22

Team	Category	Player	Statistics
Valparaiso	Passing	Teryn Berry	16–32, 150 YDS, 3 INT, 0 TD
Valparaiso	Rushing	Robert Washington	17 CAR, 143 YDS, 2 TD
Valparaiso	Receiving	Ollie Reese	2 REC, 59 YDS, 0 TD
Drake	Passing	Luke Bailey	28–48, 283 YDS, 0 INT, 2 TD
Drake	Rushing	Cross Robinson	19 CAR, 61 YDS, 0 TD
Drake	Receiving	Colin Howard	3 REC, 94 YDS, 1 TD

=== At Butler ===
Drake Bulldogs (2–3) vs. Butler Bulldogs (2–3)

Quarter	1	2	3	4	Total
Drake	0	0	6	0	6
Butler	0	3	0	0	3

at Bud and Jackie Sellick Bowl • Indianapolis, IN

- Date: Saturday, October 2, 2021
- Game time: 11:00 a.m. CDT
- Game weather: rainy, wind SW 10 • Temperature: 78°F
- Game attendance: 3,398
- Referee: Mike Packard
- TV: YouTube

Game information

First Quarter

- None

Second Quarter

- (1:39) BU – JJ Wadas 40 Yd Field Goal (Drive: 10 plays, 37 yards, 3:34; BU 3–0)

Third Quarter

- (4:53) DU – Cross Robinson 4 Yd Run (Shane Dunning PAT failed) (Drive: 11 plays, 90 yards, 6:28; DU 6–3)

Fourth Quarter

- None

Statistics	DU	BU
First downs	16	15
Total yards	312	244
Rushes/yards	43/131	30/135
Passing yards	181	109
Passing: Comp–Att–Int	13–24–0	12–21–0
Time of possession	33:06	26:54

Team	Category	Player	Statistics
Drake	Passing	Blake Ellingson	13–23, 181 YDS, 0 INT, 0 TD
Drake	Rushing	Cross Robinson	19 CAR, 63 YDS, 1 TD
Drake	Receiving	Colin Howard	4 REC, 92 YDS, 0 TD
Butler	Passing	Bret Bushka	12–20, 109 YDS, 0 INT, 0 TD
Butler	Rushing	Bret Bushka	14 CAR, 78 YDS, 0 TD
Butler	Receiving	Yogi Flager	6 REC, 82 YDS, 0 TD

=== Vs. Dayton ===
Dayton Flyers (3–2) vs. Drake Bulldogs (2–4)

Quarter	1	2	3	4	Total
Dayton	0	14	7	7	28
Drake	0	0	0	10	10

at Drake Stadium • Des Moines, IA

- Date: Saturday, October 9, 2021
- Game time: 12:00 p.m. CDT
- Game weather: sunny, wind SE 10mp • Temperature: 74°F
- Game attendance: 2,116
- Referee: Marcel Kerr
- TV: ESPN3

Game information

First Quarter

- None

Second Quarter

- (12:58) UD – Ca’Ron Coleman 4 Yd Fumble Return (Sam Webster Kick) (Drive: 5 plays, -21 yards, 2:05; UD 7–0)
- (3:27) UD – Jack Cook 5 Yd Run (Sam Webster Kick) (Drive: 10 plays, 62 yards, 4:46; UD 14–0)

Third Quarter

- (4:38) UD – Jake Chisholm 4 Yd Run (Sam Webster Kick) (Drive: 14 plays, 96 yards, 6:55; UD 21–0)

Fourth Quarter

- (12:06) DU – Shane Dunning 33 Yd Field Goal (Drive: 11 plays, 49 yards, 3:17; UD 21–3)
- (9:28) DU – Brandon Langdok 18 Yd pass from Blake Ellingson (Shane Dunning Kick) (Drive: 4 plays, 70 yards, 0:51; UD 21–10)
- (4:05) UD – Jake Chisholm 10 Yd Run (Sam Webster Kick) (Drive: 9 plays, 46 yards, 5:22; UD 28–10)

Statistics	UD	DU
First downs	22	18
Total yards	340	303
Rushes/yards	41/157	29/59
Passing yards	183	244
Passing: Comp–Att–Int	21–29–1	19–33–0
Time of possession	33:47	26:13

Team	Category	Player	Statistics
Dayton	Passing	Jack Cook	21–29, 183 YDS, 1 INT, 0 TD
Dayton	Rushing	Jake Chisholm	34 CAR, 144 YDS, 2 TD
Dayton	Receiving	Joey Swanson	5 REC, 65 YDS, 0 TD
Drake	Passing	Blake Ellingson	19–33, 244 YDS, 0 INT, 1 TD
Drake	Rushing	Blake Ellingson	7 CAR, 48 YDS, 0 TD
Drake	Receiving	Brandon Langdok	4 REC, 64 YDS, 1 TD

=== At San Diego ===
Drake Bulldogs (2–5) vs. San Diego Toreros (3–4)

Quarter	1	2	3	4	Total
Drake	3	0	7	0	10
San Diego	0	0	10	3	13

at Torero Stadium • San Diego, CA

- Date: Saturday, October 16, 2021
- Game time: 4:00 p.m. CST
- Game weather: sunny, wind E 3mp • Temperature: 81°F
- Game attendance: 3,358
- Referee: Jeff Reid
- TV: Stadium

Game information

First Quarter

- (10:34) DU – Shane Dunning 38 Yd Field Goal (Drive: 5 plays, 19 yards, 2:39; DU 3–0)

Second Quarter

- None

Third Quarter

- (7:30) USD – Pablo Tager 53 Yd Field Goal (Drive: 8 plays, 32 yards, 3:23; Tied 3–3)
- (6:04) DU – Caden Meis 22 Yd Run (Shane Dunning Kick) (Drive: 3 plays, 75 yards, 1:26; DU 10–3)
- (1:29) USD – Michael Gadinis 10 Yd pass from Mason Randall (Brandon Eickert Kick) (Drive: 9 plays, 94 yards, 4:35; Tied 10–10)

Fourth Quarter

- (9:50) USD – Brandon Eickert 44 Yd Field Goal (Drive: 10 plays, 33 yards, 5:10; USD 13–10)

Statistics	DU	USD
First downs	12	18
Total yards	222	302
Rushes/yards	34/121	33/122
Passing yards	101	180
Passing: Comp–Att–Int	6–13–1	19–30–0
Time of possession	25:24	34:36

Team	Category	Player	Statistics
Drake	Passing	Sean Cooney	6–13, 101 YDS, 1 INT, 0 TD
Drake	Rushing	Dorian Boyland	9 CAR, 67 YDS, 0 TD
Drake	Receiving	Dorian Boyland	2 REC, 55 YDS, 0 TD
San Diego	Passing	Mason Randall	19–30, 180 YDS, 0 INT, 1 TD
San Diego	Rushing	Terrence Smith	19 CAR, 89 YDS, 0 TD
San Diego	Receiving	Michael Gadinis	6 REC, 53 YDS, 1 TD

=== Vs. Stetson ===
Stetson Hatters (3–4) vs. Drake Bulldogs (2–6)

Quarter	1	2	3	4	Total
Stetson	2	0	0	0	2
Drake	0	0	0	0	0

at Drake Stadium • Des Moines, IA

- Date: Saturday, October 23, 2021
- Game time: 12:00 p.m. CST
- Game weather: sunny, wind W 3mp • Temperature: 56°F
- Game attendance: 0
- Referee: Aaron Adams
- TV: ESPN3

Game information

First Quarter

- (15:00) SU – Awarded 2 Points due to Forfeit (Covid-19 Issues Drake) (Drive: 0 plays, 0 yards, 0:00; SU 2–0)

Second Quarter

- None

Third Quarter

- None

Fourth Quarter

- None

Statistics	SU	DU
First downs	0	0
Total yards	0	0
Rushes/yards	0/0	0/0
Passing yards	0	0
Passing: Comp–Att–Int	0–0–0	0–0–0
Time of possession	0:00	0:00

Team	Category	Player	Statistics
Stetson	Passing	Tied	0–0, 0 YDS, 0 INT, 0 TD
Stetson	Rushing	Tied	0 CAR, 0 YDS, 0 TD
Stetson	Receiving	Tied	0 REC, 0 YDS, 0 TD
Drake	Passing	Tied	0–0, 0 YDS, 0 INT, 0 TD
Drake	Rushing	Tied	0 CAR, 0 YDS, 0 TD
Drake	Receiving	Tied	0 REC, 0 YDS, 0 TD

=== At Marist ===
Drake Bulldogs (2–7) vs. Marist Red Foxes (4–4)

Quarter	1	2	3	4	Total
Drake	0	0	0	0	0
Marist	0	0	7	0	7

at Tenney Stadium at Leonidoff Field • Poughkeepsie, NY

- Date: Saturday, November 6, 2021
- Game time: 11:00 a.m. CDT
- Game weather: sunny, wind S 2mp • Temperature: 45°F
- Game attendance: 1,357
- Referee: Scott MacDonald
- TV: ESPN3

Game information

First Quarter

- None

Second Quarter

- None

Third Quarter

- (0:50) MC – Hunter Cobb 10 Yd pass from Austin Day (Luke Paladino Kick) (Drive: 5 plays, 70 yards, 2:37; MC 7–0)

Fourth Quarter

- None

Statistics	DU	MC
First downs	13	15
Total yards	248	256
Rushes/yards	33/104	31/70
Passing yards	144	186
Passing: Comp–Att–Int	13–27–1	21–28–1
Time of possession	27:29	32:31

Team	Category	Player	Statistics
Drake	Passing	Ian Corwin	13–27, 144 YDS, 1 INT, 0 TD
Drake	Rushing	Cross Robinson	14 CAR, 45 YDS, 0 TD
Drake	Receiving	Colin Howard	3 REC, 60 YDS, 0 TD
Marist	Passing	Austin Day	21–28, 186 YDS, 1 INT, 1 TD
Marist	Rushing	Hunter Cobb	12 CAR, 39 YDS, 0 TD
Marist	Receiving	Will Downes	4 REC, 47 YDS, 0 TD

=== Vs. St. Thomas (MN) ===
St. Thomas Tommies (6–3) vs. Drake Bulldogs (2–8)

Quarter	1	2	3	4	Total
St. Thomas	0	14	7	0	21
Drake	0	0	7	7	14

at Drake Stadium • Des Moines, IA

- Date: Saturday, November 13, 2021
- Game time: 12:00 p.m. CST
- Game weather: cloudy, wind W 10mp • Temperature: 33°F
- Game attendance: 1,878
- Referee: Jason Berg
- TV: ESPN3

Game information

First Quarter

- None

Second Quarter

- (7:38) UST – Hope Adebayo 2 Yd Run (Louis Hyde Kick) (Drive: 14 plays, 84 yards, 7:15; UST 7–0)
- (0:13) UST – Hope Adebayo 8 Yd Run (Louis Hyde Kick) (Drive: 6 plays, 50 yards, 0:56; UST 14–0)

Third Quarter

- (4:13) DU – Brandon Langdok 3 Yd Run (Shane Dunning Kick) (Drive: 7 plays, 74 yards, 3:15; UST 14–7)
- (0:54) UST – Nick Rice 28 Yd Run (Louis Hyde Kick) (Drive: 3 plays, 43 yards, 1:52; UST 21–7)

Fourth Quarter

- (5:26) DU – Caden Meiss 6 Yd pass from Ian Corwin (Shane Dunning Kick) (Drive: 10 plays, 61 yards, 2:39; UST 21–14)

Statistics	UST	DU
First downs	20	16
Total yards	359	239
Rushes/yards	51/213	26/73
Passing yards	146	166
Passing: Comp–Att–Int	13–23–1	18–33–5
Time of possession	35:29	24:31

Team	Category	Player	Statistics
St. Thomas	Passing	Cade Sexauer	8–14, 111 YDS, 1 INT, 0 TD
St. Thomas	Rushing	Hope Adebayo	23 CAR, 105 YDS, 2 TD
St. Thomas	Receiving	Nick Rice	6 REC, 47 YDS, 0 TD
Drake	Passing	Ian Corwin	17–31, 166 YDS, 4 INT, 1 TD
Drake	Rushing	Caden Meis	7 CAR, 49 YDS, 0 TD
Drake	Receiving	Matt Hartlieb	5 REC, 40 YDS, 0 TD

=== At Davidson ===
Drake Bulldogs (2–9) vs. Davidson Wildcats (8–2)

Quarter	1	2	3	4	Total
Drake	0	7	7	0	14
Davidson	21	3	7	14	45

at Richardson Stadium • Davidson, NC

- Date: Saturday, November 20, 2021
- Game time: 12:00 p.m. CDT
- Game weather: sunny, wind S 1mp • Temperature: 32°F
- Game attendance: 4,207
- Referee: Larry Adcock
- TV: Davidson Network

Game information

First Quarter

- (13:36) DC – Aris Hilliard 67 Yd Run (Caden Bonoffski Kick) (Drive: 3 plays, 76 yards, 1:18; DC 7–0)
- (9:11) DC – Eli Turner Jr. 20 Yd Run (Caden Bonoffski Kick) (Drive: 7 plays, 44 yards, 2:58; DC 14–0)
- (1:24) DC – Coy Williams 19 Yd pass from Louis Colosimo (Caden Bonoffski Kick) (Drive: 11 plays, 72 yards, 6:12; DC 21–0)

Second Quarter

- (2:35) DC – Caden Bonoffski 26 Yd Field Goal (Drive: 11 plays, 71 yards, 5:20; DC 24–0)
- (0:39) DU – Andrew Kasten 4 Yd Run (Shane Dunning Kick) (Drive: 9 plays, 36 yards, 1:46; DC 24–7)

Third Quarter

- (12:33) DU – Trey Radocha 20 Yd pass from Ian Corwin (Shane Dunning Kick) (Drive: 6 plays, 82 yards, 2:20; MC 24–14)
- (3:33) DC – Coy Williams 4 Yd Run (Caden Bonoffski Kick) (Drive: 20 plays, 82 yards, 8:56; DC 31–14)

Fourth Quarter

- (9:16) DC – Aris Hilliard 5 Yd Run (Caden Bonoffski Kick) (Drive: 17 plays, 80 yards, 7:52; DC 38–14)
- (1:49) DC – Gunnar Leyendecker 1 Yd Run (Caden Bonoffski Kick) (Drive: 6 plays, 91 yards, 2:50; DC 45–14)

Statistics	DU	DC
First downs	9	29
Total yards	190	586
Rushes/yards	15/27	72/470
Passing yards	163	116
Passing: Comp–Att–Int	17–34–1	12–21–0
Time of possession	16:31	43:29

Team	Category	Player	Statistics
Drake	Passing	Ian Corwin	10–22, 117 YDS, 1 INT, 1 TD
Drake	Rushing	Jun Ahn	2 CAR, 6 YDS, 0 TD
Drake	Receiving	Brandon Langdok	7 REC, 61 YDS, 0 TD
Davidson	Passing	Louis Colosimo	11–20, 114 YDS, 0 INT, 1 TD
Davidson	Rushing	Aris Hilliard	10 CAR, 133 YDS, 2 TD
Davidson	Receiving	Jayden Waddell	3 REC, 45 YDS, 0 TD

== Roster ==
2021 Drake Bulldogs football team
Quarterback: 2 Luke Bailey – sophomore (6'0", 172)'; 4 Sean Cooney – sophomore (6’6”, 207)'; 6 Blake Ellingson – freshman (6’2”, 195)'; 9 Ian Corwin – junior (6'0", 187)'; 15 Ruben Beltran – junior (6’1”, 200)'; Running back: 16 Jun Ahn – sophomore (5'6", 175)'; 23 Triston Burkett – sophomore (5'11", 195)'; 24 Ian Ridge – freshman (5'9", 180)'; 25 Cross Robinson - Fifth Year (6’0”, 225); 27 Caden Meis – junior (5’11", 205)'; 34 Nas Reynolds – freshman (5’9”, 165)'; 36 Dorian Boyland – freshman (6’1”, 225)'; 42 Davion Cherwin – freshman (5’9”, 195)'; Fullback: 30 Grant Gossling - Fifth Year (6'1", 250); 49 Eli Stewart – sophomore (6'2", 228)'; Wide receiver: 5 Hunter Johnson – sophomore (5’11", 170)’’''; 13 Jacob McCauley – sophomore (5’11”, 170)'; 17 Andrew Kasten – senior (5’11”, 176)'; 18 Joe Coit – junior (5'10", 176)'; 21 Michael Markett – junior (6’0”, 175)'; 28 Zach Drummond – junior (6’1”, 185)'; 80 Colin Howard – junior (6'1", 205)'; 81 Dante Denardo – freshman (6'1", 185)'; 82 Austin Flax – freshman (5'9", 175)'; 83 Brandon Langdok – sophomore (6’0”, 170)'; 84 Trey Radocha – sophomore (5'11", 195)'; 88 Zach Gray – junior (6’2”, 200)'; Tight end: 19 Matt Hartlieb – senior (6'1", 215)'; 33 Ryan Hayes – senior (6’2”, 240)'; 40 Sam Carpenter – freshman (6’4”, 250)'; 44 Brenden Burton – junior (6’4”, 236)'; 47 Ben Millman – sophomore (6’2”, 225)'; 85 Sam Rodriguez – sophomore (6’2”, 230)'; 86 AJ Britten – freshman (6’4”, 220)'; 87 Tim Nesslage – sophomore (6’1”, 220)'	Offensive Lineman: 52 Bennet Krebs – sophomore (6’2”, 270)'; 53 Jonathan Engle – senior (6’2”, 295)'; 59 JP Reilly – sophomore (6’0”, 270)'; 60 Jack Lehmann – senior (6’5”, 270)'; 61 Daniel Bowers – sophomore (6'4", 278)'; 62 Parker Althaus – junior (6’4”, 285)'; 63 Andrew Grout – junior (6’3”, 290)'; 64 Mark Bach - Fifth Year (6’0”, 367); 65 Evan Maples – sophomore (6'1", 275)'; 66 Colin Mott – senior (6'2", 270)'; 67 Patrick Conlon – senior (6’6”, 305)'; 68 Ross Palmer – freshman (6’6”, 340)'; 70 Tyler Barrett - Fifth Year (6’5”, 310); 71 Rhent Addis – sophomore (6’4”, 325)'; 72 Isaac House – sophomore (6’4”, 270)'; 73 Bryce Bowers – freshman (6'4", 305)'; 75 Kyle Kennedy – freshman (6’3”, 265)'; 76 Jimmy Poremba – junior (6’3”, 290)'; 78 Braeden McLaughlin – senior (6'4", 275)'; 79 Max Morris – freshman (6’4”, 250)'; Defensive Lineman: 15 Johnny Hill – senior (6’1”, 214)'; 24 Kieran Kohorst – senior (6’4”, 235)'; 31 Andrew Stafford – junior (6’1”, 230)'; 40 Jacob Richard - Fifth Year (6’1”, 285); 46 Jason Christenson – sophomore (6’1”, 258)'; 48 Ben Gerdes – senior (6’3”, 235)'; 56 Jake Shipla – sophomore (6’1”, 265)'; 57 Zachary Kincade – senior (6'2", 270)'; 58 Pat Strocchia – freshman (6’4”, 220)'; 69 Nolan Engmann – junior (6’3”, 270)'; 77 Max Johnson - Fifth Year (6’3”, 280); 90 Finn Claypool – freshman (6’1”, 240)'; 92 Ryan Erickson – senior (6’4”, 255)'; 93 Ethan Rohman – sophomore (6’2”, 258)'; 94 Stenton Quaye – freshman (6’2”, 220)'; 95 Ben Kujawa – freshman (6’3”, 270)'; 96 Jake Hoper – senior (6’4”, 269)'; 98 Connor Groff – freshman (6’3”, 225)'	Linebacker: 7 Tanner Pollock – junior (6’1”, 210)'; 10 Declan Carr – senior (6'1", 226)'; 26 Noah Larson - Fifth Year (6’1”, 208); 35 Will Kulick - Fifth Year (6’2”, 223); 37 Hudson Fields – sophomore (6'1", 215)'; 39 Ryan Kriceri - Fifth Year (6’2”, 235); 41 Colton Wolfe – freshman (6’1”, 205)'; 45 Andrew Johnson– senior (6’2”, 224)'; 46 Joe Frommelt – sophomore (6’1”, 200)'; 51 Riley Theobald – sophomore (6’2”, 245)'; 52 Sebastian Adamski – freshman (6’0”, 230)'; 54 Tom Shefte – freshman (6’3”, 198)'; 55 Jacob Thompson – sophomore (6’1”, 213)'; Defensive back: 0 Jakobe Davidson – senior (5'10", 182)'; 1 Ethan Zager – sophomore (6’0”, 175)'; 2 Tony Graham II – sophomore (5'11", 165)'; 3 Gage Vander Leest – junior (5'11", 200)'; 4 Joey Lukrich – junior (6'1", 190)'; 5 CJ Grisar – freshman (5’9”, 170)'; 6 Jeremy Villalobos. – sophomore (6’1”, 175)'; 8 Tyler Radocha – sophomore (5’11”, 195)'; 9 Alex Rogers - Fifth Year (6'0", 210); 11 Jeran Proctor - Fifth Year (5’10”, 165); 14 Nick Cagnetto – junior (5’11”, 185)'; 18 Holden Hughes – freshman (6’2”, 180)'; 19 Caleb Bowling – freshman (5’10”, 190)'; 20 Eian O’Brien – senior (6’2”, 195)'; 23 Jackson Williams – sophomore (5’11”, 178)'; 29 Riley Dravet – freshman (5’10”, 185)'; 30 Ty Scott – freshman (6’0”, 165)'; 32 Danny Morales – senior (5’11”, 180)'; 34 Drew Bramlett – sophomore (5’11”, 194)'; 38 Sebastian Felix – freshman (6’0”, 190)'; 50 Sam Anderson – freshman (6’2”, 185)'; Special teams: 12 Jack Ierulli – junior (6’0”, 178)'; 89 Shane Dunning – sophomore (6’0”, 175)'; 91 Phil Tita – freshman (6’2”, 180)'; 99 Nathan De Bruin – junior (6'0", 170)'
