= 2021 St. Thomas Tommies football team =

American college football season

2021 St. Thomas Tommies football
- Conference: Pioneer Football League
- Record: 7–3 (6–2 PFL)
- Head coach: Glenn Caruso (13th season)
- Offensive coordinator: Bruce Carpenter (5th season)
- Defensive coordinator: Wallie Kuchinski (13 season)
- Home stadium: O'Shaughnessy Stadium

2021 Pioneer Football League standings
	Conf.			Overall
Team	W		L	W		L
Davidson +^	7	–	1	8	–	3
San Diego +	7	–	1	7	–	4
St. Thomas (MN) *	6	–	2	7	–	3
Morehead State	6	–	2	7	–	4
Marist	5	–	3	5	–	5
Dayton	5	–	3	6	–	4
Valparaiso	4	–	4	4	–	7
Stetson	2	–	6	4	–	7
Drake	1	–	7	2	–	9
Butler	1	–	7	3	–	8
Presbyterian	0	–	8	2	–	9
+ – Conference co-champions; ^ – FCS playoff participant; * – St. Thomas (MN) ineligible for FCS postseason play due to transition from NCAA Division III

The 2021 St. Thomas Tommies football team represented the University of St. Thomas in Saint Paul, Minnesota as a member of the Pioneer Football League (PFL) during the 2021 NCAA Division I FCS football season. Led by 13th-year head coach Glenn Caruso, the Tommies compiled an overall record of 7–3 with a mark of 6–2 in conference play, tying for third place in the PFL. St. Thomas played home games at O'Shaughnessy Stadium in Saint Paul, Minnesota.

This was the St. Thomas's first season competing at the NCAA Division I Football Championship Subdivision (FCS) level after transitioning from NCAA Division III. The 2020 season was initially postponed to the spring of 2021 and then canceled because of the COVID-19 pandemic.

== Schedule ==
Date	Time	Opponent	Site	TV	Result	Attendance
September 4	1:00 p.m.	St. Francis (IL)*	O'Shaughnessy Stadium; Saint Paul, MN		Cancelled	
September 11	12:10 p.m.	at Michigan Tech*	Sherman Field; Houghton, MI		W 12–9	1,660
September 18	4:00 p.m.	at No. 18 Northern Iowa*	UNI-Dome; Cedar Falls, IA	ESPN+	L 3–44	5,124
September 25	12:00 p.m.	Butler	O'Shaughnessy Stadium; Saint Paul, MN		W 36–0	5,051
October 2	3:00 p.m.	at San Diego	Torero Stadium; San Diego, CA		L 24–27	1,097
October 9	1:00 p.m.	Valparaiso^{†}	O'Shaughnessy Stadium; Saint Paul, MN		W 20–13	7,433
October 16	12:00 p.m.	at Stetson	Spec Martin Stadium; DeLand, FL	ESPN3	W 38–7	1,169
October 30	1:00 p.m.	Marist	O'Shaughnessy Stadium; Saint Paul, MN		W 27–7	3,215
November 6	12:00 p.m.	at Davidson	Richardson Stadium; Davidson, NC		L 15–42	3,912
November 13	12:00 p.m.	at Drake	Drake Stadium; Des Moines, IA	ESPN3	W 21–14	1,878
November 20	1:00 p.m.	Presbyterian	O'Shaughnessy Stadium; Saint Paul, MN		W 54–15	3,245
*Non-conference game; ^{†}Homecoming; Rankings from STATS Poll released prior to the game; All times are in Central time
