= 2021 San Diego Toreros football team =

American college football season

2021 San Diego Toreros football

PFL co-champion
- Conference: Pioneer Football League
- Record: 7–4 (7–1 PFL)
- Head coach: Dale Lindsey (9th season)
- Defensive coordinator: Bobby Jay (4th season)
- Home stadium: Torero Stadium

2021 Pioneer Football League standings
	Conf.			Overall
Team	W		L	W		L
Davidson +^	7	–	1	8	–	3
San Diego +	7	–	1	7	–	4
St. Thomas (MN) *	6	–	2	7	–	3
Morehead State	6	–	2	7	–	4
Marist	5	–	3	5	–	5
Dayton	5	–	3	6	–	4
Valparaiso	4	–	4	4	–	7
Stetson	2	–	6	4	–	7
Drake	1	–	7	2	–	9
Butler	1	–	7	3	–	8
Presbyterian	0	–	8	2	–	9
+ – Conference co-champions; ^ – FCS playoff participant; * – St. Thomas (MN) ineligible for FCS postseason play due to transition from NCAA Division III

The 2021 San Diego Toreros football team represented the University of San Diego as a member of the Pioneer Football League (PFL) during the 2021 NCAA Division I FCS football season. Led by ninth-year head coach Dale Lindsey, the Toreros compiled an overall record of 7–4 with a mark of 7–1 conference play, sharing the PFL with Davidson. The team played home games at Torero Stadium in San Diego.

== Schedule ==
Date	Time	Opponent	Site	TV	Result	Attendance
September 4	1:00 p.m.	Cal Poly*	Torero Stadium; San Diego, CA		L 17–28	2,966
September 11	1:00 p.m.	No. 14 UC Davis*	Torero Stadium; San Diego, CA		L 7–53	1,712
September 18	12:00 p.m.	at No. 13 Montana State*	Bobcat Stadium; Bozeman, MT		L 10–52	19,107
September 25	1:00 p.m.	at Davidson	Richardson Stadium; Davidson, NC		L 16–28	4,021
October 2	1:00 p.m.	St. Thomas (MN)	Torero Stadium; San Diego, CA		W 27–24	1,097
October 9	12:00 p.m.	at Butler	Bud and Jackie Sellick Bowl; Indianapolis, IN		W 52-21	2,855
October 16	2:00 p.m.	Drake^{†}	Torero Stadium; San Diego, CA		W 13-10	3,358
October 23	1:00 p.m.	at Presbyterian	Bailey Memorial Stadium; Clinton, SC	ESPN+	W 69-28	3,561
October 30	1:00 p.m.	Valparaiso	Torero Stadium; San Diego, CA		W 21-14	1,024
November 6	1:00 p.m.	Morehead State	Torero Stadium; San Diego, CA		W 10-3	1,763
November 20	1:00 p.m.	at Stetson	Spec Martin Stadium; DeLand, FL	ESPN+	W 41–16	1,040
*Non-conference game; ^{†}Homecoming; Rankings from STATS Poll released prior to the game; All times are in Eastern time
