= 2021 Stetson Hatters football team =

American college football season

2021 Stetson Hatters football
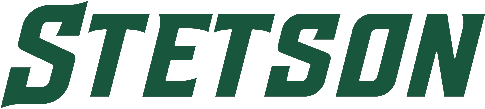
- Conference: Pioneer Football League
- Record: 4–7 (2–6 PFL)
- Head coach: Brian Young (1st season)
- Defensive coordinator: Steve Davis (2nd season)
- Home stadium: Spec Martin Stadium

2021 Pioneer Football League standings
	Conf.			Overall
Team	W		L	W		L
Davidson +^	7	–	1	8	–	3
San Diego +	7	–	1	7	–	4
St. Thomas (MN) *	6	–	2	7	–	3
Morehead State	6	–	2	7	–	4
Marist	5	–	3	5	–	5
Dayton	5	–	3	6	–	4
Valparaiso	4	–	4	4	–	7
Stetson	2	–	6	4	–	7
Drake	1	–	7	2	–	9
Butler	1	–	7	3	–	8
Presbyterian	0	–	8	2	–	9
+ – Conference co-champions; ^ – FCS playoff participant; * – St. Thomas (MN) ineligible for FCS postseason play due to transition from NCAA Division III

The 2021 Stetson Hatters football team represented Stetson University as a member of the Pioneer Football League (PFL) during the 2021 NCAA Division I FCS football season. Led by first-year head coach Brian Young, the Hatters compiled an overall record of 4–7 with a mark of 2–6 in conference play, placing eighth in the PFL. Stetson played home games at Spec Martin Stadium in DeLand, Florida.

== Schedule ==
Date	Time	Opponent	Site	TV	Result	Attendance
September 4	6:00 p.m.	Warner*	Spec Martin Stadium; DeLand, FL		W 54–14	1,503
September 11	6:00 p.m.	Ave Maria*	Spec Martin Stadium; DeLand, FL		W 49–16	1,291
September 25	1:00 p.m.	at Princeton*	Powers Field at Princeton Stadium; Princeton, NJ		L 0–63	4,429
October 2	1:00 p.m.	Davidson	Spec Martin Stadium; DeLand, FL		L 28–35	1,011
October 9	12:00 p.m.	at Marist	Tenney Stadium at Leonidoff Field; Poughkeepsie, New York	ESPN3	L 3–34	1,292
October 16	1:00 p.m.	St. Thomas (MN)	Spec Martin Stadium; DeLand, FL		L 7–38	1,169
October 23		at Drake	Drake Stadium; Des Moines, IA		W 2–0 (forfeit) (Note: The Pioneer Football League canceled the game scheduled due to COVID-19 issues within Drake's program. In addition, in accordance with PFL policies, the game will be declared a forfeit.)	
October 30	1:00 p.m.	at Presbyterian	Bailey Memorial Stadium; Clinton, SC	ESPN+	W 56–14	1,762
November 6	1:00 p.m.	Dayton	Spec Martin Stadium; DeLand, FL	ESPN3	L 13–41	1,312
November 13	1:00 p.m.	at Morehead State	Jayne Stadium; Morehead, KY	ESPN3	L 35–36	6,214
November 20	1:00 p.m.	San Diego	Spec Martin Stadium; DeLand, FL	ESPN+	L 16–41	1,040
*Non-conference game; All times are in Eastern time
