= 2021 Morehead State Eagles football team =

American college football season

2021 Morehead State Eagles football
- Conference: Pioneer Football League
- Record: 7–4 (6–2 PFL)
- Head coach: Rob Tenyer (9th season)
- Defensive coordinator: Andrew Strobel (1st season)
- Home stadium: Jayne Stadium

2021 Pioneer Football League standings
	Conf.			Overall
Team	W		L	W		L
Davidson +^	7	–	1	8	–	3
San Diego +	7	–	1	7	–	4
St. Thomas (MN) *	6	–	2	7	–	3
Morehead State	6	–	2	7	–	4
Marist	5	–	3	5	–	5
Dayton	5	–	3	6	–	4
Valparaiso	4	–	4	4	–	7
Stetson	2	–	6	4	–	7
Drake	1	–	7	2	–	9
Butler	1	–	7	3	–	8
Presbyterian	0	–	8	2	–	9
+ – Conference co-champions; ^ – FCS playoff participant; * – St. Thomas (MN) ineligible for FCS postseason play due to transition from NCAA Division III

The 2021 Morehead State Eagles football team represented Morehead State University in the 2021 NCAA Division I FCS football season as a member of the Pioneer Football League. They were led by ninth-year head coach Rob Tenyer and played their home games at Jayne Stadium.

== Schedule ==
Date	Time	Opponent	Site	TV	Result	Attendance
September 4	6:00 p.m.	at No. 2 James Madison*	Bridgeforth Stadium; Harrisonburg, VA		L 10–68	22,229
September 11	2:00 p.m.	Union (KY)*	Jayne Stadium; Morehead, KY	ESPN+	W 62–9	6,607
September 18	3:00 p.m.	at No. 19 Austin Peay*	Fortera Stadium; Clarksville, TN	ESPN+	L 35–59	4,821
October 2	2:00 p.m.	Dayton	Jayne Stadium; Morehead, KY	ESPN+	W 45–38 ^{OT}	6,145
October 9	1:00 p.m.	at Presbyterian	Bailey Memorial Stadium; Clinton, SC	ESPN+	W 38–30	2,118
October 16	3:00 p.m.	Butler	Jayne Stadium; Morehead, KY	ESPN+	W 31–8	7,885
October 23	12:00 p.m.	at Marist	Tenney Stadium at Leonidoff Field; Poughkeepsie, NY	ESPN3	W 27–24	1,682
October 30	2:00 p.m.	Davidson	Jayne Stadium; Morehead, KY	ESPN3	L 22–29	6,683
November 6	4:00 p.m.	at San Diego	Torero Stadium; San Diego, CA		L 3–10	1,763
November 13	1:00 p.m.	Stetson	Jayne Stadium; Morehead, KY	ESPN3	W 36–35	6,214
November 20	2:00 p.m.	at Valparaiso	Brown Field; Valparaiso, IN	ESPN3	W 51–38	1,294
*Non-conference game; Rankings from STATS Poll released prior to the game; All times are in Eastern time
