= 2021 Marist Red Foxes football team =

American college football season

2021 Marist Red Foxes football
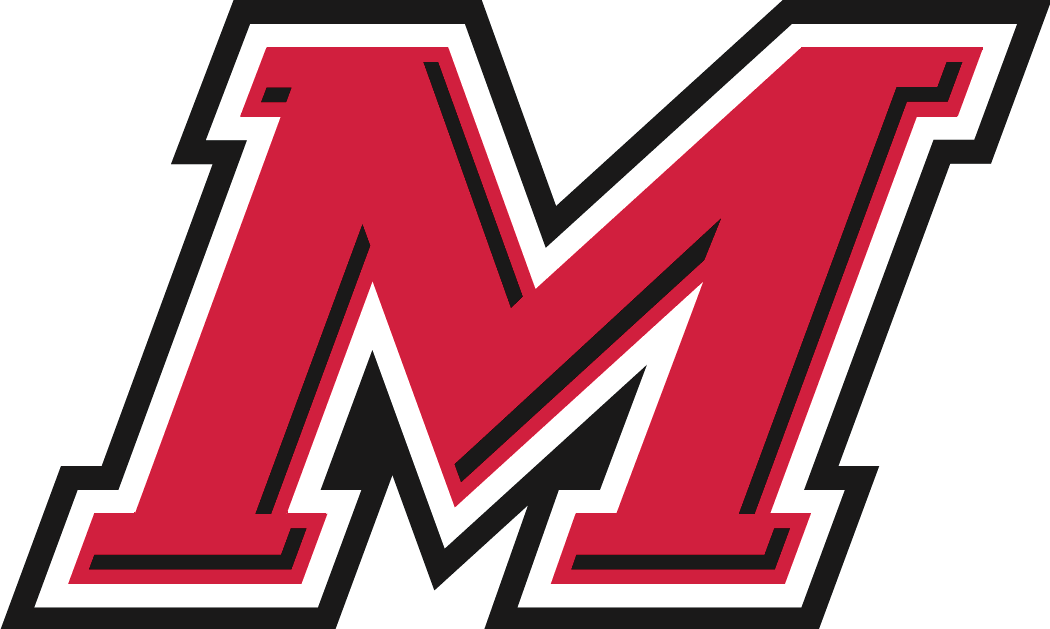
- Conference: Pioneer Football League
- Record: 5–5 (5–3 PFL)
- Head coach: Jim Parady (29th season)
- Offensive coordinator: Jake Dembow (2nd season)
- Defensive coordinator: Scott Rumsey (22nd season)
- Home stadium: Tenney Stadium at Leonidoff Field

2021 Pioneer Football League standings
	Conf.			Overall
Team	W		L	W		L
Davidson +^	7	–	1	8	–	3
San Diego +	7	–	1	7	–	4
St. Thomas (MN) *	6	–	2	7	–	3
Morehead State	6	–	2	7	–	4
Marist	5	–	3	5	–	5
Dayton	5	–	3	6	–	4
Valparaiso	4	–	4	4	–	7
Stetson	2	–	6	4	–	7
Drake	1	–	7	2	–	9
Butler	1	–	7	3	–	8
Presbyterian	0	–	8	2	–	9
+ – Conference co-champions; ^ – FCS playoff participant; * – St. Thomas (MN) ineligible for FCS postseason play due to transition from NCAA Division III

The 2021 Marist Red Foxes football team represented Marist College as a member of the Pioneer Football League (PFL) during the 2021 NCAA Division I FCS football season. Led by 29th-year head coach Jim Parady, the Red Foxes compiled an overall record of 5–5 with a mark of 5–3 in conference play, tying for fifth place in the PFL. Marist played home games at Tenney Stadium at Leonidoff Field in Poughkeepsie, New York.

== Schedule ==
Date	Time	Opponent	Site	TV	Result	Attendance
September 4		at Georgetown*	Cooper Field; Washington, DC		Cancelled (Note: The Marist at Georgetown game was cancelled on August 31, 2021, due to COVID-19 problems within the Georgetown program.)	
September 18	1:00 p.m	at Columbia*	Robert K. Kraft Field at Lawrence A. Wien Stadium; New York City, NY	SNY/ESPN+	L 14–37	3,479
September 25	6:00 p.m	Bryant*	Tenney Stadium at Leonidoff Field; Poughkeepsie, NY	ESPN3	L 17–34	6,154
October 2	1:00 p.m	at Valparaiso	Brown Field; Valparaiso, IN	ESPN3	W 27–24 ^{OT}	3,079
October 9	12:00 p.m	Stetson	Tenney Stadium at Leonidoff Field; Poughkeepsie, NY	ESPN3	W 34–3	1,292
October 16	1:00 p.m	at Dayton	Welcome Stadium; Dayton, OH	Facebook	W 20–17	2,299
October 23	12:00 p.m	Morehead State	Tenney Stadium at Leonidoff Field; Poughkeepsie, NY	ESPN3	L 24–27	1,682
October 30	2:00 p.m	at St. Thomas (MN)	O'Shaughnessy Stadium; Saint Paul, MN		L 7–27	3,215
November 6	12:00 p.m	Drake	Tenney Stadium at Leonidoff Field; Poughkeepsie, NY	ESPN3	W 7–0	1,357
November 13	1:00 p.m	at Presbyterian	Bailey Memorial Stadium; Clinton, SC	ESPN+	W 57–32	1,778
November 20	12:00 p.m	Butler	Tenney Stadium at Leonidoff Field; Poughkeepsie, NY		L 21–28	1,325
*Non-conference game; All times are in Eastern time
