= 2021 Valparaiso Beacons football team =

American college football season

2021 Valparaiso Beacons football
- Conference: Pioneer Football League
- Record: 4–7 (4–4 PFL)
- Head coach: Landon Fox (3rd season)
- Offensive coordinator: Chris Limbach (3rd season)
- Defensive coordinator: Brian Dougherty (3rd season)
- Home stadium: Brown Field

2021 Pioneer Football League standings
	Conf.			Overall
Team	W		L	W		L
Davidson +^	7	–	1	8	–	3
San Diego +	7	–	1	7	–	4
St. Thomas (MN) *	6	–	2	7	–	3
Morehead State	6	–	2	7	–	4
Marist	5	–	3	5	–	5
Dayton	5	–	3	6	–	4
Valparaiso	4	–	4	4	–	7
Stetson	2	–	6	4	–	7
Drake	1	–	7	2	–	9
Butler	1	–	7	3	–	8
Presbyterian	0	–	8	2	–	9
+ – Conference co-champions; ^ – FCS playoff participant; * – St. Thomas (MN) ineligible for FCS postseason play due to transition from NCAA Division III

The 2021 Valparaiso Beacons football team represented Valparaiso University in the 2021 NCAA Division I FCS football season as a member of the Pioneer Football League. They were led by third-year head coach Landon Fox and played their home games at Brown Field.

== Schedule ==
Date	Time	Opponent	Site	TV	Result	Attendance
September 4	5:00 p.m.	at Indiana Wesleyan*	Wildcat Football Stadium; Marion, IN	ESPN3	L 10–28	3,000
September 11	2:30 p.m.	at No. 5 North Dakota State*	Fargodome; Fargo, ND	WDAY	L 0–64	15,118
September 18	1:00 p.m.	Dartmouth*	Brown Field; Valparaiso, IN	ESPN3	L 18–28	3,856
September 25	12:00 p.m.	at Drake	Drake Stadium; Des Moines, IA	ESPN3	W 24–21	6,039
October 2	12:00 p.m.	Marist	Brown Field; Valparaiso, IN	ESPN3	L 27–24 ^{OT}	3,079
October 9	1:00 p.m.	at St. Thomas	O'Shaughnessy Stadium; Saint Paul, MN		L 13–20	7,433
October 23	12:00 p.m.	Dayton	Brown Field; Valparaiso, IN	ESPN3	W 45–28	2,950
October 30	3:00 p.m.	at San Diego	Torero Stadium; San Diego, CA		L 14–21	1,024
November 6	1:00 p.m.	Presbyterian	Brown Field; Valparaiso, IN	ESPN3	W 65–55	1,223
November 13	11 a.m.	at Butler	Bud and Jackie Sellick Bowl; Indianapolis, IN		W 47–3	2,548
November 20	1:00 p.m.	Morehead State	Brown Field; Valparaiso, IN	ESPN3	L 38–51	1,294
*Non-conference game; Rankings from STATS Poll released prior to the game; All times are in Eastern time
