= 2021 Dayton Flyers football team =

American college football season

2021 Dayton Flyers football
- Conference: Pioneer Football League
- Record: 6–4 (5–3 PFL)
- Head coach: Rick Chamberlin (13th season)
- Offensive coordinator: Jim Collins (1st season)
- Defensive coordinator: Tee Overman (2nd season)
- Home stadium: Welcome Stadium

2021 Pioneer Football League standings
	Conf.			Overall
Team	W		L	W		L
Davidson +^	7	–	1	8	–	3
San Diego +	7	–	1	7	–	4
St. Thomas (MN) *	6	–	2	7	–	3
Morehead State	6	–	2	7	–	4
Marist	5	–	3	5	–	5
Dayton	5	–	3	6	–	4
Valparaiso	4	–	4	4	–	7
Stetson	2	–	6	4	–	7
Drake	1	–	7	2	–	9
Butler	1	–	7	3	–	8
Presbyterian	0	–	8	2	–	9
+ – Conference co-champions; ^ – FCS playoff participant; * – St. Thomas (MN) ineligible for FCS postseason play due to transition from NCAA Division III

The 2021 Dayton Flyers football team represented the University of Dayton as a member of the Pioneer Football League (PFL) during the 2021 NCAA Division I FCS football season. Led by 13th-year head coach Rick Chamberlin, the Flyers compiled an overall record of 6–4 with a mark of 5–3 in conference play, tying for fifth place in the PFL. Dayton played home games at Welcome Stadium in Dayton, Ohio.

== Preseason ==
=== Preseason coaches' poll ===
The Pioneer League released their preseason coaches' poll on July 27, 2021. The Flyers were picked to finish in fourth place.

Predicted finish	Team	Votes (1st place)
1	Davidson	97 (8)
2	San Diego	93 (3)
3	Drake	67
4	Dayton	62
5	Presbyterian	59
6	Valparaiso	55
7	Morehead State	51
8	St. Thomas	36
9	Marist	35
9	Stetson	35
11	Butler	15

=== Preseason All-PFL teams ===
The Flyers had five players selected to the preseason all–PFL teams.

Offense

First team

- Jack cook – QB
- Jake chisholm – RB

Defense

First team

- Brandon easterling – DB

Honorable mention

- Zach rumpke – LB

Special teams

Second team

- Sam webster – PK

== Schedule ==
Date	Time	Opponent	Site	TV	Result	Attendance	Source
September 4	12:00 p.m.	Robert Morris*	Welcome Stadium; Dayton, OH		Cancelled		
September 11	1:00 p.m.	Eastern Illinois*	Welcome Stadium; Dayton, OH		W 17–10	2,008	
September 18	7:00 p.m.	at No. 8 Southern Illinois*	Saluki Stadium; Carbondale, IL	ESPN+	L 3–55	7,338	
September 25	1:00 p.m.	Presbyterian	Welcome Stadium; Dayton, OH	Facebook	W 63–43	4,766	
October 2	2:00 p.m.	at Morehead State	Jayne Stadium; Morehead, KY	ESPN+	L 38–45 ^{OT}	6,145	
October 9	1:00 p.m.	at Drake	Drake Stadium; Des Moines, IA )rivalry)	ESPN3	W 28–10	2,116	
October 16	1:00 p.m.	Marist	Welcome Stadium; Dayton, OH		L 17–20	2,299	
October 23	1:00 p.m.	at Valparaiso	Brown Field; Valparaiso, IN	ESPN3	L 28–45	2,950	
October 30	1:00 p.m.	Butler	Welcome Stadium; Dayton, OH		W 38–31	2,153	
November 6	1:00 p.m.	at Stetson	Spec Martin Stadium; DeLand, FL	ESPN3	W 41–13	1,312	
November 13	1:00 p.m.	Davidson	Welcome Stadium; Dayton, OH		W 38–29	2,233	
*Non-conference game; Rankings from STATS Poll released prior to the game; All times are in Eastern time

- Dayton's game with Robert Morris was cancelled due to a COVID-19 outbreak at Robert Morris. The game was not rescheduled.
