= 2021 Butler Bulldogs football team =

American college football season

2021 Butler Bulldogs football
- Conference: Pioneer Football League
- Record: 3–8 (1–7 PFL)
- Head coach: Jeff Voris (16th season)
- Offensive coordinator: Kyle Conner (6th season)
- Defensive coordinator: Joe Cheshire (12th season)
- Home stadium: Bud and Jackie Sellick Bowl

2021 Pioneer Football League standings
	Conf.			Overall
Team	W		L	W		L
Davidson +^	7	–	1	8	–	3
San Diego +	7	–	1	7	–	4
St. Thomas (MN) *	6	–	2	7	–	3
Morehead State	6	–	2	7	–	4
Marist	5	–	3	5	–	5
Dayton	5	–	3	6	–	4
Valparaiso	4	–	4	4	–	7
Stetson	2	–	6	4	–	7
Drake	1	–	7	2	–	9
Butler	1	–	7	3	–	8
Presbyterian	0	–	8	2	–	9
+ – Conference co-champions; ^ – FCS playoff participant; * – St. Thomas (MN) ineligible for FCS postseason play due to transition from NCAA Division III

The 2021 Butler Bulldogs football team represented Butler University in the 2021 NCAA Division I FCS football season as a member of the Pioneer Football League. Led by Jeff Voris in his 16th and final season as head coach, Bulldogs compiled an overall record of 3–8 with a mark of 1–7 in conference play, tying for ninth place in the PFL. Butler played home games at the Bud and Jackie Sellick Bowl in Indianapolis.

== Schedule ==
Date	Time	Opponent	Site	TV	Result	Attendance
September 4	7:30 p.m.	at Illinois State*	Hancock Stadium; Normal, IL		L 7–49	8,148
September 11	6:00 p.m.	DePauw*	Bud and Jackie Sellick Bowl; Indianapolis, IN		W 49–24	5,371
September 18	7:00 p.m.	at Taylor*	Turner Stadium; Upland, IN		W 77–24	2,874
September 25	1:00 p.m.	at St. Thomas (MN)	O'Shaughnessy Stadium; Saint Paul, MN		L 0–36	5,051
October 2	1:00 p.m.	Drake	Bud and Jackie Sellick Bowl; Indianapolis, IN		L 3–6	3,398
October 9	12:00 p.m.	San Diego	Bud and Jackie Sellick Bowl; Indianapolis, IN		L 21–52	2,855
October 16	3:00 p.m.	at Morehead State	Jayne Stadium; Morehead, KY	ESPN+	L 8–31	7,885
October 23	1:00 p.m.	Davidson	Bud and Jackie Sellick Bow; Indianapolis, IN		L 35–49	2,586
October 30	1:00 p.m.	at Dayton	Welcome Stadium; Dayton, OH		L 31–38	2,153
November 13	12:00 p.m.	Valparaiso	Bud and Jackie Sellick Bowl; Indianapolis, IN		L 3–47	2,548
November 20	12:00 p.m.	at Marist	Tenney Stadium at Leonidoff Field; Poughkeepsie, NY		W 28–21	1,325
*Non-conference game; Rankings from STATS Poll released prior to the game; All times are in Eastern time
