= Pulaski Academy =

Prep school in Little Rock, Arkansas, US

Location
- 12701 Hinson Road; Little Rock, Arkansas; United States; 34°46′18″N 92°24′53″W

Information
- Type: Private Secondary
- Established: 1971 (55 years ago)
- Status: Open
- CEEB code: 041444
- NCES School ID: 00048235
- Headmaster: Garry Sullivan, President & Head of School
- Grades: 2.5 year old–12 grade
- Enrollment: 1460 (2026-2027)
- Campus: Suburban
- Campus size: 32 acres (13 ha)
- Colors: Navy blue, Vegas gold, white
- Mascot: Bruin
- Nickname: PA
- Team name: Pulaski Academy Bruins
- Affiliations: Nonsectarian
- Website: www.pulaskiacademy.org

Pulaski Academy (PA) is a private, independent college preparatory preschool, elementary, and junior/senior high school headed by Garry Sullivan in the Pleasant Valley neighborhood of Little Rock, Arkansas, United States. PA was established in 1971 as a segregation academy and remains as the only independent, non-sectarian, college preparatory school in Little Rock.

== History ==
When busing was introduced in the early 1970s to counteract the effects of racially defined residential patterns, whites built private schools in the suburbs or fled the county altogether. In 1971, the segregationist businessman William F. Rector announced the construction of the private Pulaski Academy in the western suburbs of the city for those, he said, who "don't like busing." Pulaski was the first school established after the Swann v. Charlotte-Mecklenburg Board of Education decision (1971). Rector said, "I even hope we'll be allowed to play Dixie if we want to without having a riot about it."

In 2006, Pulaski Academy purchased the campus of Fellowship Bible Church, on the corner of Hinson and Napa Valley, increasing the campus to 32 acres (13 ha).

== Academics ==
PA is accredited by SAIS (Southern Association of Independent Schools), and ANSAA (Arkansas Non-public School Accrediting Association). PA is a member of the Cum Laude Society, Arkansas Activities Association (AAA), College Board and NAIS (National Association of Independent Schools).

Pulaski Academy was named 2003 "Best of the Best" Private High School by the readers of an Arkansas Democrat-Gazette contest.

During the 2008–09 academic year, fifteen members of the Class of 2009 were named as National Merit Scholars, three as Commended Scholars and twelve as Finalists. Enrollment for the 2009–10 academic year was approximately 1,210 K-12 students, with a student–teacher ratio of 8.9:1.

== Extracurricular activities ==
The school's mascot is the Bruin and school colors are Navy blue and Vegas gold. For 2026-2027 school year, the Pulaski Academy Bruins play in the 4A, 5A, 6A, and 7A Central Conference administered by the Arkansas Activities Association, depending on the sport. Under AAA's Competitive Equity program, independent schools in Arkansas are classified based on team results instead of enrollment. The school participates in baseball, basketball (boys/girls), cheer, cross country, Pom, football, soccer (boys/girls), softball, swimming and diving (boys/girls), tennis (boys/girls), golf (boys/girls) volleyball(girls), lacrosse (boys/girls), and wrestling.

The school's football team has won nine state championships since 2003. The team was coached by Kevin Kelley until 2021, who gained notoriety for his strategies, which include the total rejection of punting and returning punts, as well as a reliance on the onside kick. The team is now coached by Mark Kelley.

=== Athletic state championships ===
The Pulaski Academy Bruins have won 85 state championships:

- Wrestling (4x): 2018, 2019, 2020, 2021
- Girls Tennis (19x): 1980, 1987, 1988, 1989, 1992, 1994, 1997, 2003, 2004, 2005, 2006, 2010, 2015, 2017, 2019, 2020, 2021, 2022, 2023
- Boys Tennis (19x): 1987, 2002, Fall 2003, Spring 2003, 2004, 2005, 2007, 2010, 2011, 2012, 2015, 2016, 2017, 2018, 2019, 2020, 2021, 2023, 2025
- Baseball (6x): 1993, 1994, 2002, 2003, 2013, 2026
- Girls Soccer (9x): 2003, 2005, 2007, 2008, 2011, 2012, 2021, 2022, 2024
- Boys Soccer (3x): 2000, 2001, 2007
- Girls Swimming (2x) 2014, 2015
- Football (11x): (2003 3A), (2008 5A), (2011 4A) (2014 5A), (2015 5A), (2016 5A), (2017 5A), (2019 5A), (2020 5A), (2021 5A), (2022 6A)
- Boys Basketball (2x): 2002, 2003
- Girls Basketball (1x): 2026
- All Golf Team (5x) : 2000, 2001, 2003, 2004, 2006
- Dance (3x): 2020, 2021, 2025
- Girls Volleyball (1x): 2025

== Notable alumni ==
- Ashlie Atkinson, actress
- Ayana Gray, novelist
- Dusty Hannahs (born 1993), basketball player in the Israeli Basketball Premier League
- Will Hastings, American football wide receiver
- Hunter Henry, tight end in the NFL for the New England Patriots
- John M. Jumper, AI researcher, recipient of the Nobel Prize in Chemistry
- Jason King, former offensive guard in the NFL for the New England Patriots and Baltimore Ravens
- Amy Lee, lead singer of Evanescence. The song Listen to the Rain, written by her, was sung at her Class of 2000 graduation ceremony
- Jonathan Luigs, played in the NFL for the Cincinnati Bengals
