= List of Arkansas state high school golf champions =

This is a list of Arkansas state high school golf championships sanctioned by the Arkansas Activities Association.

Listings include champions of the annual spring state golf championship tournament at each classification level based on size of school population.

== Boys golf champions ==
The following is a list of Arkansas state champions in boys golf:

- 2026 – LR Catholic, Shiloh Christian, Harrison, Episcopal Collegiate, White County Central, Armorel
- 2025 – Rogers, Little Rock Christian, Brookland, Fouke, Spring Hill, Armorel
- 2024 – LR Catholic, Little Rock Christian, Fountain Lake, Maumelle Charter, Conway Christian, Armorel
- 2023 – Rogers, Benton, Brookland, Episcopal Collegiate, Cedar Ridge, Armorel
- 2022 – Fayetteville, Benton, Brookland, Maumelle Charter, Bigelow, Taylor
- 2021 – LR Catholic, HS Lakeside, Valley View, Baptist Prep, Melbourne, Izard County
- 2020 – Bentonville, El Dorado, Valley View, Baptist Prep, Melbourne, Taylor
- 2019 – Bentonville, Jonesboro, Valley View, Baptist Prep, Maumelle Charter, Scranton
- 2018 – Cabot, Paragould, Valley View, Baptist Prep, St. Joseph, Conway, County Line
- 2017 – Fayetteville, Jonesboro, Little Rock Christian, Shiloh Christian, Harding Academy, Buffalo Island Central, Izard County
- 2016 – Fayetteville, Jonesboro, Valley View, Shiloh Christian, Harding Academy, Buffalo Island Central, Concord
- 2015 – Fayetteville, Jonesboro, Little Rock Christian, Baptist Prep, Melbourne, Buffalo Island Central, Concord
- 2014 – Fayetteville, Jonesboro, HS Lakeside, Shiloh Christian, Fordyce, Spring Hill, Concord
- 2013 – Fayetteville, Jonesboro, HS Lakeside, Arkansas Baptist, Harding Academy-Episcopal Collegiate, Buffalo Island Central, Ouachita
- 2012 – Conway, Jonesboro, Harrison, Central Arkansas Christian, Episcopal Collegiate, Conway St. Joseph, Concord
- 2011 – Conway, Jonesboro, HS Lakeside, Valley View, Episcopal Collegiate, Marked Tree, Izard County
- 2010 – Cabot, Jonesboro, HS Lakeside, Valley View, Arkansas Baptist, Conway St. Joseph, Izard County
- 2009 – Cabot, Benton, HS Lakeside, Fordyce, Episcopal Collegiate, Melbourne
- 2008 – Conway, Benton, Harrison, Ozark, Arkansas Baptist, Conway St. Joseph
- 2007 – Rogers, Mountain Home, Greenwood, Arkansas Baptist, Conway St. Joseph, Parkers Chapel
- 2006 – tie – LR Catholic-Conway, Mountain Home, HS Lakeside, Arkansas Baptist, Conway St. Joseph, Parkers Chapel
- 2005 – FS Southside, Batesville, Central Arkansas Christian, Arkansas Baptist
- 2004 – Fayetteville, Alma, Nashville, Jessieville
- 2003 – FS Southside, Arkadelphia, Pulaski Academy, Jessieville
- 2003 – Cabot, Greenwood, Pulaski Academy, LR Cathedral
- 2002 – Conway, Batesville, Beebe, Melbourne
- 2001 - Cabot, Siloam Springs, Pulaski Academy, Walnut Valley
- 2000 – Cabot, Siloam Springs, Pulaski Academy, FS Christian, (Hunter Still, Hope,AR won District, State and Overall)
- 1999 – Cabot, Hope, Bismarck, tie – Mammoth Spring-Parkers Chapel
- 1998 – Cabot, Hope, tie – Lonoke-McGehee, Manila
- 1997 – Cabot, Harrison, Central Arkansas Christian, Mammoth,Spring, Hope
- 1996 – Jonesboro, Harrison, De Queen, Shiloh Christian
- 1995 – Jonesboro, Batesville, Pocahontas, Central Arkansas Christian
- 1994 – Blytheville, Searcy, Lonoke, Central Arkansas Christian
- 1993 – FS Southside, HS Lakeside, Pocahontas, Manila
- 1992 – Springdale, Magnolia, Fountain Lake
- 1991 – LR Catholic, Searcy, Pocahontas
- 1990 – LR Catholic, Searcy, Fountain Lake
- 1989 – LR Catholic, HS Lakeside, McCrory
- 1988 – Jonesboro, HS Lakeside, McGehee
- 1987 – El Dorado, HS Lakeside, Fountain Lake
- 1986 – Russellville, Searcy, Jefferson Prep
- 1985 – LR Catholic, Batesville, Jefferson Prep
- 1984 – Benton, Camden, De Queen
- 1983 – Pine Bluff, FS Southside, Searcy, Bald Knob
- 1982 – LR Central, Conway, Camden, Piggott
- 1981 – LR Central, Benton, Camden, Piggott
- 1980 – LR Central, Jonesboro, HS Lakeside, Pulaski Academy
- 1979 – NLR Northeast
- 1978 – Conway, Camden
- 1977 – FS Northside, HS Lakeside
- 1976 – LR Parkview, Russellville, Van Buren, Bald Knob
- 1975 – NLR Northeast, Blytheville, Camden, Manila
- 1974 – LR Parkview, FS Southside, Camden, De Queen
- 1973 – El Dorado, Forrest City, Camden, Manila
- 1972 – Pine Bluff, Hot Springs, Camden, Gosnell
- 1971 – FS Northside, Hot Springs, Searcy, Augusta
- 1970 – LR Central, Van Buren, Heber Springs
- 1969 – LR Hall, Forrest City, Heber Springs
- 1968 – El Dorado, Sylvan Hills, Crawfordsville
- 1967 – El Dorado, LR Catholic, Crawfordsville
- 1966 – El Dorado, Russellville, McGehee
- 1965 – North Little Rock, LR Catholic, Fordyce
- 1964 – LR Hall, LR Catholic, Fordyce
- 1963 – LR Hall, Fayetteville, Fordyce
- 1962 – Hot Springs, Fayetteville, Arkadelphia
- 1961 – Hot Springs, Fayetteville, Sacred Heart
- 1960 – Texarkana, Fayetteville, Dollarway
- 1959 – Texarkana, Benton, Dumas
- 1958 – Little Rock, Benton, Prescott
- 1957 – Texarkana, Hope
- 1956 – Little Rock, Arkadelphia
- 1955 – Little Rock, Arkadelphia
- 1954 – Little Rock, Crossett
- 1953 – El Dorado, Monticello
- 1952 – El Dorado, Fayetteville
- 1951 – El Dorado, Fayetteville
- 1950 – El Dorado, Fayetteville
- 1949 – N/A
- 1948 – Little Rock

== Girls golf champions ==
The following is a list of Arkansas state champions in girls golf:

- 2026 – Rogers, Russellville, Brookland, Smackover, Magnet Cove, Crowley's Ridge Academy
- 2025 – Mount St. Mary, Russellville, Brookland, Episcopal, Parkers Chapel, West Side Greers Ferry
- 2024 – Mount St. Mary, Russellville, Brookland, Bismarck, Parkers Chapel, West Side Greers Ferry
- 2023 – Mount St. Mary, Russellville, Brookland, Salem, Horatio, West Side Greers Ferry
- 2022 – Har-Ber, Hot Springs Lakeside, Gravette, Charleston, St. Joseph, Viola
- 2021 – Har-Ber, El Dorado, Brookland, Bismarck, Conway Christian, West Side Greers Ferry
- 2020 – Har-Ber, El Dorado, Brookland, Bismarck, Conway Christian, West Side Greers Ferry
- 2019 – Bentonville, Hot Springs Lakeside, Brookland, Bismarck, Melbourne, West Side Greers Ferry
- 2018 – Bentonville, Hot Springs Lakeside, Nashville, Bismarck, Melbourne, Lead Hill
- 2017 – Bentonville, Greenwood, HS Lakeside, Arkansas Baptist, Melbourne, Cam Harmony Grove, Lead Hill
- 2016 – Conway, Jonesboro, Little Rock Christian, Arkansas Baptist, Bismarck, Cam Harmony Grove, Lead Hill
- 2015 – FS Southside, Jonesboro, Maumelle, Central Arkansas Christian, Booneville, Spring Hill, West Side GF
- 2014 – Fort Smith Southside, Greenwood, HS Lakeside, Arkansas Baptist, Cam Harmony Grove, Spring Hill, West Side GF
- 2013 – Fayetteville, Marion, HS Lakeside, Valley View, Jessieville, Spring Hill, Shirley
- 2012 – Conway, Greenwood, HS Lakeside, Valley View, Smackover, Spring Hill, Mt Vernon–Enola
- 2011 – Fayetteville, Marion, HS Lakeside, Clarksville, Rivercrest, Eureka Springs, Shirley
- 2010 – Fayetteville, El Dorado, Greenwood, Heber Springs, Jessieville, Conway St. Joseph, West Side GF
- 2009 – Fayetteville, El Dorado, Greene County Tech, Heber Springs, Jessieville, Conway St. Joseph
- 2008 – Fayetteville, Benton, HS Lakeside, Pottsville, Arkansas Baptist, Conway St. Joseph
- 2007 – Fayetteville, El Dorado, Greenwood, Highland, Conway St. Joseph, Shirley
- 2006 – Fayetteville, Sheridan, Harrison, Clarksville, Conway St. Joseph, Melbourne
- 2005 – Fayetteville, Harrison, Clarksville, Melbourne
- 2004 – El Dorado, White Hall, Heber Springs, Conway St. Joseph
- 2003 – Fayetteville, Greenwood, Heber Springs, Shirley
- 2003 – Searcy, Greenwood, Ozark, Smackover
- 2002 – El Dorado, Vilonia, Ozark, Conway St. Joseph
- 2001 – Fayetteville, HS Lakeside, Highland, Ouachita
- 2000 – El Dorado, HS Lakeside, Highland, Conway St. Joseph
- 1999 – Mount St. Mary, HS Lakeside, Highland
- 1998 – Mount St. Mary, Searcy, Pulaski Academy
- 1997 – FS Southside, Huntsville
- 1996 – Jacksonville
- 1995 – Jacksonville
- 1994 – Jacksonville
- 1993 – Cabot
- 1992 – Cabot
- 1991 – Cabot
- 1990 – Cabot
- 1989 – Cabot
- 1988 – Cabot
- 1987 – Cabot
- 1986 – Cabot
- 1985 – Fayetteville
- 1984 – Hope
- 1983 – Mount St. Mary
- 1982 – Greene County Tech
- 1981 – Sylvan Hills
- 1980 – Paragould
- 1979 – Sylvan Hills
- 1978 – Mount St. Mary
- 1977 – Fayetteville
- 1976 – Cabot
- 1975 – Fayetteville
- 1974 – NA
- 1973 – Fayetteville
- 1972 – HS Lakeside
- 1971 – HS Lakeside

== See also ==
- Arkansas Activities Association
