= Kevin Kelley (American football) =

American football coach (born 1969)

Current position
- Title: Head coach
- Team: Sheridan High School (AR)

Biographical details
- Born: June 25, 1969 (age 57); Hot Springs, Arkansas, U.S.
- Education: Henderson State University (B.S.)

Coaching career (HC unless noted)
- 1993–1997: Carrollton ISD (TX) (assistant)
- 1997–2002: Pulaski Academy (AR) (OC)
- 2003–2020: Pulaski Academy (AR)
- 2021: Presbyterian
- 2024–present: Sheridan HS (AR)

Head coaching record
- Overall: 228–45–1 (high school); 2–9 (college)

Accomplishments and honors

Championships
- 9 AAA State (2003, 2008, 2011, 2014–2017, 2019, 2020)

Awards
- Tribeca Disruptive Innovation Award (2014); USA Today High School Coach of the Year (2016); Arkansas Sports Hall of Fame (2021)

Kevin Kelley (born June 25, 1969) is an American football coach who is currently the head coach at Sheridan High School in Sheridan, Arkansas. He formerly served as the head coach at Presbyterian College. Prior to his hiring at Presbyterian, Kelley was the head coach and athletic director at Pulaski Academy in Little Rock, Arkansas, where he won nine AAA state championships and employed an unorthodox strategy that involved rarely punting and almost always attempting onside kicks and two-point conversions.

== Early life and education ==
Originally a native of Hot Springs, Arkansas, Kelley attended Glenwood High School in Glenwood, Arkansas, which has since consolidated with a nearby school to become Centerpoint High School. Kelley then attended Henderson State University in Arkadelphia, Arkansas, graduating with a Bachelor of Science degree in 1992. He was the first member of his family to graduate from college.

== Coaching career ==
=== Carrollton ISD ===
Kelley began his coaching career at the Carrollton-Farmers Branch Independent School District in Carrollton, Texas. From 1993 to 1997, in addition to teaching earth science, he served as the head coach of one of the district's 7th-grade teams while also serving as a scout for one of the senior high teams.

=== Pulaski Academy ===
Kelley arrived at Pulaski Academy in Little Rock, Arkansas in 1997, and he served as their offensive coordinator until 2002. He was promoted to head coach in time for the 2003 season.

From 2003 to 2020, Kelley served as the head football coach at Pulaski Academy. He has gained notoriety for his unique numbers-based coaching strategy, which involves rarely punting and almost always attempting fourth down conversions ("going for it"), onside kicks (unless his team is leading by 21 points or more), and two-point conversions. Kelley's teams were consistently competitive; the Bruins won nine Arkansas Activities Association state championships under his direction, were named to the list of the top ten Arkansas football dynasties, at No. 5, by MaxPreps in 2011, and as the No. 1 most dominant Arkansas high school football program of the decade in 2020. Additionally, Kelley's offenses own each of the top 12 highest single-season yardage totals in Arkansas high school history.

Pulaski won their first title under Kelley in 2003, in his first season at the helm of the program, and subsequently won titles in 2008, 2011, 2014, 2015, 2016, 2017, 2019, and 2020; Pulaski's four consecutive titles from 2014 to 2017 made them only the fourth team in Arkansas high school history to do so, and the first since Barton High School from 1986 to 1989. Prior to the start of the 2020 season, Kelley was listed as having the 15th-highest all-time winning percentage among high school football coaches.

Kelley was named the USA Today High School Coach of the Year in 2016 and was inducted into the Arkansas Sports Hall of Fame in April 2021. Bill Belichick said of Kelley in December 2020 that he was "...probably the top high school coach in the country," and mentioned that he "[had] great respect for coach Kelley". Kelley's strategy has been the subject of reports by The New York Times, Sports Illustrated, The Wall Street Journal, and Time, and was included in a chapter of Scorecasting, a book by Toby Moskowitz and L. Jon Wertheim.

In an interview shortly after he was hired by Presbyterian, Kelley told Pete Thamel of Yahoo Sports that he was most proud of his offensive acumen, and noted that his play-calling style was as heavily data-driven as his more publicized special teams idiosyncrasies. Kelley considers his offensive philosophy "intermediate", which he defines as geared heavily toward midrange passes in front of the safeties, with a high percentage of pass plays designed to generate yards after the catch. According to Thamel,

The "intermediate" offense combines what Kelley considers the two hardest things to do in football — play pass coverages and tackle in space. He estimates that if a quarterback can throw 40 yards, that leaves seven men guarding an area that's 52 yards wide and 40 yards deep. "That's 2,000 square yards that seven guys have to defend," he said. "That's almost 30-yard squares. You know how hard it is?"

=== Presbyterian ===
Following the conclusion of the 2020 season, there were some ideas that led to speculation that Kelley could be considered for a Division I job, namely the head coaching position at Kansas, a job Kelley supposedly said he would accept for $90,000 per win. Ultimately, Kelley was hired as the 16th head football coach at Presbyterian College on May 6, 2021. He took over the Blue Hose program for their first full season in the Pioneer Football League after a shortened 2021 spring season under Tommy Spangler.

Kelley communicated his decision in an email to Pulaski Academy parents on May 6, and the college officially announced the hire on May 7, 2021.

In Kelley's debut as Presbyterian head coach on September 4, 2021, the Blue Hose broke two significant passing records in their 84–43 win over NAIA member St. Andrews. Ren Hefley threw for 10 touchdowns, breaking the previous FCS record of 9 first set in 1984 by Willie Totten of Mississippi Valley State and equaled in 2007 by Drew Hubel of Portland State. With backup quarterback Tyler Huff adding 2 TD passes, the Blue Hose set a new Division I team record (for both FCS and FBS) of 12, breaking the previous record of 11 set in 1990 by Houston quarterback David Klingler.

On December 4, 2021, Presbyterian College announced that Kelley had stepped down as head coach for personal reasons. He amassed a 2–9 record in his only year at Presbyterian.

=== Sheridan High School ===
On December 11, 2023, Kelley was named the new head football coach at Sheridan High School in Sheridan, Arkansas.

== Personal life ==
Kelley and his wife, Dana, have two children.

== Head coaching record ==
=== High school ===
Year	Team	Overall	Conference	Standing	Bowl/playoffs
Pulaski Academy Bruins (AAA) (2002–2020)
2003	Pulaski Academy	13–2	6–1	2nd	W Arkansas Activities Association Class AAA State Championship Game
2004	Pulaski Academy	10–3	7–0	1st	L Arkansas Activities Association Class AAA State Quarterfinals
2005	Pulaski Academy	11–3	6–1	2nd	L Arkansas Activities Association Class AAA State Semifinals
2006	Pulaski Academy	12–2	6–1	2nd	L Arkansas Activities Association Class AAAAA State Championship Game
2007	Pulaski Academy	9–2–1	7–0	1st	L Arkansas Activities Association Class AAAAA State Quarterfinals
2008	Pulaski Academy	13–1	7–0	1st	W Arkansas Activities Association Class AAAAA State Championship Game
2009	Pulaski Academy	9–4	5–2	3rd	L Arkansas Activities Association Class AAAAA State Semifinal
2010	Pulaski Academy	13–2	7–0	1st	L Arkansas Activities Association Class AAAA State Championship Game
2011	Pulaski Academy	15–0	7–0	1st	W Arkansas Activities Association Class AAAA State Championship Game
2012	Pulaski Academy	10–3	7–0	1st	L Arkansas Activities Association Class AAAAA State Semifinals
2013	Pulaski Academy	11–2	7–0	1st	L Arkansas Activities Association Class AAAAA State Quarterfinals
2014	Pulaski Academy	13–1	7–0	1st	W Arkansas Activities Association Class AAAAA State Championship Game
2015	Pulaski Academy	14–0	6–0	1st	W Arkansas Activities Association Class AAAAA State Championship Game
2016	Pulaski Academy	13–1	7–0	1st	W Arkansas Activities Association Class AAAAA State Championship Game
2017	Pulaski Academy	14–0	7–0	1st	W Arkansas Activities Association Class AAAAA State Championship Game
2018	Pulaski Academy	12–2	7–0	1st	L Arkansas Activities Association Class AAAAA State Championship Game
2019	Pulaski Academy	12–2	6–1	2nd	W Arkansas Activities Association Class AAAAA State Championship Game
2020	Pulaski Academy	13–0	5–0	1st	W Arkansas Activities Association Class AAAAA State Championship Game
Pulaski Academy:		216–29–1	117–6		
Sheridan High School Yellowjackets (AAA) (2024–present)
2024	Sheridan High School	3–8	2–5	6th	
2025	Sheridan High School	3–8	2–5	6th	
2026	Sheridan High School	6–0	3–0		
Sheridan High School:		12–16	7–10		
Total:		228–45–1			

=== College ===
Year	Team	Overall	Conference	Standing	Bowl/playoffs
Presbyterian Blue Hose (Pioneer Football League) (2021)
2021	Presbyterian	2–9	0–8	11th	
Presbyterian:		2–9	0–8		
Total:		2–9			
