= Richardson Stadium (Davidson) =

Stadium in North Carolina

Coordinates: 35.499598°N 80.842848°W

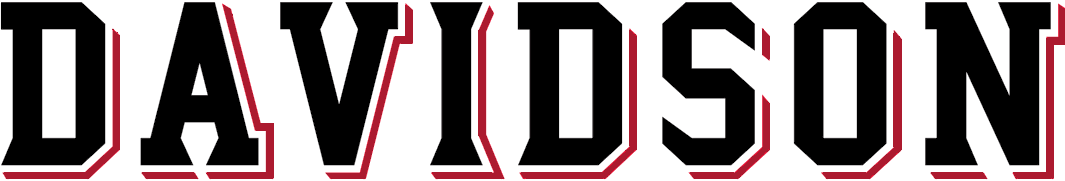

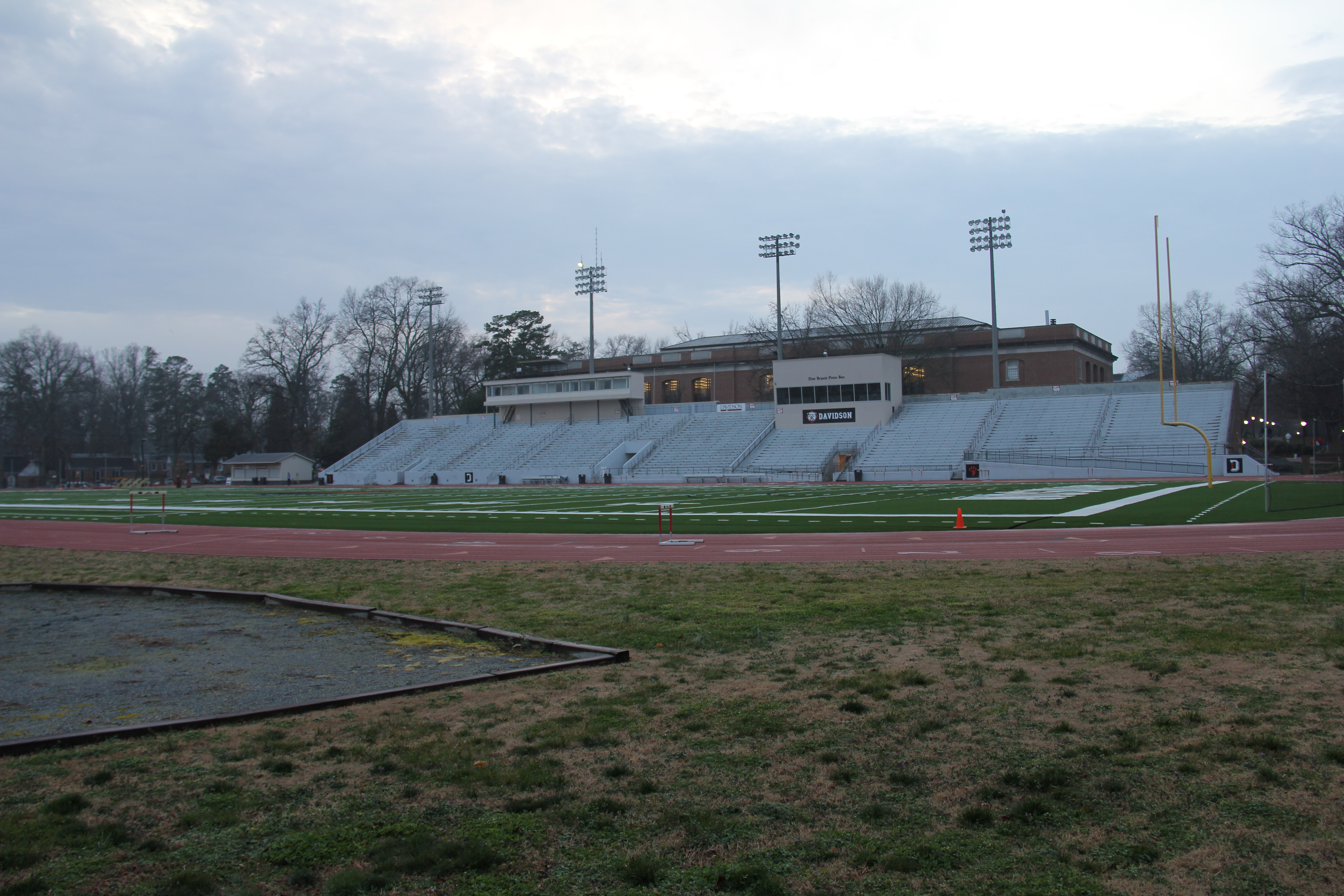
- The stadium in 2012
- Interactive map of Richardson Stadium
- Location: 201 Faculty Drive; Davidson, North Carolina 28035
- Owner: Davidson College
- Operator: Davidson College
- Capacity: 6,000
- Surface: Artificial

Construction
- Opened: 1923; 103 years ago
- Renovated: 1998, 2005

Tenants
- Davidson Wildcats (NCAA) teams: Football; Lacrosse; Track and field

Website
- davidsonwildcats.com/stadium

Richardson Stadium is a stadium in Davidson, North Carolina. It was home to the Davidson Wildcats football and lacrosse teams until 2023 and is the current home of their track and field teams.

The stadium incorporates both Stephen B. Smith Field and Irwin Belk Track. Richardson Stadium has a capacity for 6,000 people.

== Overview ==
It has also hosted the NCAA Men's Soccer Championship on three occasions from 1992 to 1994. Every autumn the stadium acts as the start and finish of the Davidson freshman Cake Race, where incoming students run a course around the college in competition for cakes baked by inhabitants of the local community. The facility opened in 1923 as Richardson Field after being donated to the college by Lunsford Richardson Jr., Davidson class of 1914, and his brother Henry Smith Richardson, Davidson class of 1906, in memory of their father, Lunsford Richardson Sr., Davidson class of 1875. It was later renovated in 1998 and again in 2005 with the latter providing upgraded amenities including expanded seating, a new press box, weight room, and visitor's locker room.

Occasionally the stadium will host Charlotte Eagles Lamar Hunt U.S. Open Cup matches when their stadium is not big enough for demand.

== See also ==
- List of NCAA Division I FCS football stadiums

| Preceded by USF Soccer Stadium | Host of the College Cup; 1992–1994 | Succeeded by Richmond Stadium |
