= List of Pioneer Football League standings =

This is a list of yearly Pioneer Football League standings.

== Pioneer League standings ==
1993 Pioneer Football League standings
	Conf.			Overall
Team	W		L	W		L
Dayton $	5	–	0	9	–	1
Drake	3	–	2	8	–	2
Butler	3	–	2	4	–	6
Evansville	2	–	3	6	–	4
San Diego	1	–	4	6	–	4
Valparaiso	1	–	4	5	–	5
$ – Conference champion

1994 Pioneer Football League standings
	Conf.			Overall
Team	W		L	W		L
Dayton +	4	–	1	8	–	2
Butler +	4	–	1	7	–	3
Drake	3	–	2	7	–	3
Valparaiso	2	–	3	7	–	3
San Diego	2	–	3	6	–	4
Evansville	0	–	5	4	–	6
+ – Conference co-champions

1995 Pioneer Football League standings
	Conf.					Overall
Team	W		L		T	W		L		T
Drake $	5	–	0	–	0	8	–	1	–	1
Dayton	4	–	1	–	0	9	–	2	–	0
San Diego	3	–	2	–	0	5	–	5	–	0
Evansville	1	–	4	–	0	5	–	5	–	0
Valparaiso	1	–	4	–	0	5	–	5	–	0
Butler	1	–	4	–	0	2	–	8	–	0
$ – Conference champion

1996 Pioneer Football League standings
	Conf.			Overall
Team	W		L	W		L
No. 24 Dayton $	5	–	0	11	–	0
Drake	4	–	1	8	–	3
Evansville	2	–	3	5	–	5
Butler	2	–	3	3	–	7
San Diego	1	–	4	4	–	6
Valparaiso	1	–	4	4	–	6
$ – Conference champion; Rankings from The Sports Network poll

1997 Pioneer Football League standings
	Conf.			Overall
Team	W		L	W		L
No. 23 Dayton $	5	–	0	9	–	1
San Diego	4	–	1	8	–	3
Drake	2	–	3	8	–	3
Butler	2	–	3	6	–	4
Valparaiso	2	–	3	3	–	7
Evansville	0	–	5	2	–	8
$ – Conference champion; Rankings from The Sports Network poll

1998 Pioneer Football League standings
	Conf.			Overall
Team	W		L	W		L
Drake $	4	–	0	7	–	3
Dayton	3	–	1	6	–	4
Valparaiso	2	–	2	5	–	6
Butler	1	–	3	4	–	6
San Diego	0	–	4	2	–	8
$ – Conference champion

1999 Pioneer Football League standings
	Conf.			Overall
Team	W		L	W		L
Dayton $	4	–	0	6	–	4
Valparaiso	3	–	1	9	–	2
Drake	2	–	2	7	–	4
San Diego	1	–	3	5	–	5
Butler	0	–	4	5	–	5
$ – Conference champion

2000 Pioneer Football League standings
	Conf.			Overall
Team	W		L	W		L
Dayton +	3	–	1	8	–	3
Drake +	3	–	1	7	–	4
Valparaiso +	3	–	1	7	–	4
San Diego	1	–	3	4	–	6
Butler	0	–	4	2	–	8
+ – Conference co-champions

2001 Pioneer Football League standings
	Conf.			Overall
Team	W		L	W		L
North Division
Dayton xy$	3	–	0	10	–	1
Butler	2	–	2	5	–	5
San Diego	2	–	2	6	–	3
Drake	1	–	3	5	–	5
Valparaiso	1	–	3	3	–	8
South Division
Jacksonville xy	3	–	0	6	–	5
Morehead State	2	–	1	6	–	5
Davidson	1	–	2	5	–	4
Austin Peay	0	–	3	3	–	7
Championship: Dayton 46, Jacksonville 14
$ – Conference champion; x – Division champion/co-champions; y – Championship game participant

2002 Pioneer Football League standings
	Conf.			Overall
Team	W		L	W		L
North Division
Dayton xy$	4	–	0	11	–	1
San Diego	3	–	1	5	–	5
Butler	2	–	2	4	–	6
Drake	1	–	3	5	–	6
Valparaiso	0	–	4	1	–	10
South Division
Morehead State xy	3	–	0	9	–	3
Davidson	2	–	1	7	–	3
Austin Peay	1	–	2	7	–	5
Jacksonville	0	–	3	3	–	7
Championship: Dayton 28, Morehead State 0
$ – Conference champion; x – Division champion/co-champions; y – Championship game participant

2003 Pioneer Football League standings
	Conf.			Overall
Team	W		L	W		L
North Division
Valparaiso xy$	3	–	1	8	–	4
San Diego x	3	–	1	8	–	2
Dayton	2	–	2	9	–	2
Drake	1	–	3	6	–	6
Butler	1	–	3	2	–	9
South Division
Morehead State xy	3	–	0	8	–	3
Jacksonville	1	–	2	4	–	6
Austin Peay	1	–	2	4	–	7
Davidson	1	–	2	3	–	8
Championship: Valparaiso 54, Morehead State 42
$ – Conference champion; x – Division champion/co-champions; y – Championship game participant

2004 Pioneer Football League standings
	Conf.			Overall
Team	W		L	W		L
North Division
Drake xy$	4	–	0	10	–	2
San Diego	3	–	1	7	–	4
Dayton	2	–	2	7	–	3
Valparaiso	1	–	3	5	–	6
Butler	0	–	4	1	–	10
South Division
Morehead State xy	2	–	1	6	–	6
Jacksonville x	2	–	1	3	–	7
Davidson	1	–	2	2	–	7
Austin Peay	1	–	2	2	–	9
Championship: Drake 20, Morehead State 17
$ – Conference champion; x – Division champion/co-champions; y – Championship game participant

2005 Pioneer Football League standings
	Conf.			Overall
Team	W		L	W		L
North Division
San Diego xy$	4	–	0	11	–	1
Dayton	3	–	1	9	–	1
Drake	2	–	2	6	–	4
Valparaiso	1	–	3	3	–	8
Butler	0	–	4	0	–	11
South Division
Morehead State xy	3	–	0	8	–	4
Jacksonville	2	–	1	4	–	4
Davidson	1	–	2	4	–	6
Austin Peay	0	–	3	2	–	9
Championship: San Diego 47, Morehead State 40
$ – Conference champion; x – Division champion/co-champions; y – Championship game participant

2006 Pioneer Football League standings
	Conf.			Overall
Team	W		L	W		L
No. 20 San Diego $	7	–	0	11	–	1
Drake	6	–	1	9	–	2
Davidson	5	–	2	6	–	4
Jacksonville	4	–	3	4	–	6
Butler	2	–	5	3	–	8
Morehead State	2	–	5	2	–	9
Dayton	1	–	6	4	–	6
Valparaiso	1	–	6	3	–	8
$ – Conference champion; ^ – FCS playoff participant; Rankings from The Sports Network poll

2007 Pioneer Football League standings
	Conf.			Overall
Team	W		L	W		L
Dayton +	6	–	1	11	–	1
San Diego +	6	–	1	9	–	2
Morehead State	5	–	2	7	–	4
Davidson	4	–	3	6	–	4
Drake	3	–	4	6	–	5
Valparaiso	2	–	5	5	–	6
Jacksonville	2	–	5	3	–	8
Butler	0	–	7	4	–	7
+ – Conference co-champions

2008 Pioneer Football League standings
	Conf.			Overall
Team	W		L	W		L
Jacksonville $	7	–	1	9	–	4
San Diego	6	–	2	9	–	2
Dayton	6	–	2	9	–	3
Butler	4	–	4	6	–	5
Drake	4	–	4	6	–	5
Morehead State	4	–	4	6	–	6
Davidson	3	–	5	4	–	7
Valparaiso	2	–	6	3	–	8
Campbell	0	–	8	1	–	10
$ – Conference champion

2009 Pioneer Football League standings
	Conf.			Overall
Team	W		L	W		L
Butler +	7	–	1	11	–	1
Dayton +	7	–	1	9	–	2
Drake	6	–	2	8	–	3
Jacksonville	6	–	2	7	–	4
Marist	5	–	3	7	–	4
San Diego	3	–	5	4	–	7
Davidson	3	–	5	3	–	7
Campbell	2	–	6	3	–	8
Morehead State	1	–	7	3	–	8
Valparaiso	0	–	8	1	–	10
+ – Conference co-champions

2010 Pioneer Football League standings
	Conf.			Overall
Team	W		L	W		L
No. 22 Jacksonville +	8	–	0	10	–	1
No. 25 Dayton +	8	–	0	10	–	1
Drake	6	–	2	7	–	4
San Diego	5	–	3	5	–	6
Morehead State	4	–	4	5	–	6
Davidson	3	–	5	3	–	8
Butler	2	–	6	4	–	7
Marist	2	–	6	3	–	8
Campbell	2	–	6	3	–	8
Valparaiso	0	–	8	0	–	11
+ – Conference co-champions; Rankings from The Sports Network poll

2011 Pioneer Football League standings
	Conf.			Overall
Team	W		L	W		L
San Diego +	7	–	1	9	–	2
Drake +	7	–	1	9	–	2
Jacksonville	6	–	2	7	–	4
Campbell	5	–	3	6	–	5
Dayton	4	–	4	6	–	5
Marist	3	–	5	4	–	7
Butler	3	–	5	5	–	6
Davidson	2	–	6	4	–	7
Morehead State	2	–	6	3	–	8
Valparaiso	1	–	7	1	–	10
+ – Conference co-champions

2012 Pioneer Football League standings
	Conf.			Overall
Team	W		L	W		L
Butler +	7	–	1	8	–	3
Drake +	7	–	1	8	–	3
San Diego +	7	–	1	8	–	3
Jacksonville	5	–	3	7	–	4
Dayton	5	–	3	6	–	5
Marist	3	–	5	4	–	7
Morehead State	3	–	5	4	–	7
Davidson	2	–	6	2	–	9
Valparaiso	1	–	7	1	–	10
Campbell	0	–	8	1	–	10
+ – Conference co-champions

2013 Pioneer Football League standings
	Conf.			Overall
Team	W		L	W		L
Marist +	7	–	1	8	–	3
Butler +^	7	–	1	9	–	4
Mercer	6	–	2	10	–	2
Dayton	5	–	3	7	–	4
Drake	5	–	3	6	–	5
Jacksonville	4	–	4	5	–	6
Morehead State	3	–	5	3	–	9
Campbell	2	–	6	3	–	9
Stetson	1	–	7	2	–	9
Valparaiso	1	–	7	1	–	10
Davidson	0	–	8	0	–	11
San Diego	0	–	0	8	–	3
+ – Conference co-champions; ^ – FCS playoff participant; San Diego declared itself ineligible for conference title because of improper scholarships for football players; it will have an official conference record of 0–0 and will not have a place in the conference standings.

2014 Pioneer Football League standings
	Conf.			Overall
Team	W		L	W		L
San Diego $^	7	–	1	9	–	3
Jacksonville *	7	–	1	9	–	2
Dayton	6	–	2	8	–	3
Drake	6	–	2	7	–	4
Campbell	4	–	4	5	–	7
Marist	4	–	4	4	–	7
Stetson	3	–	5	5	–	7
Morehead State	3	–	5	4	–	8
Butler	2	–	6	4	–	7
Valparaiso	2	–	6	4	–	8
Davidson	0	–	8	1	–	11
$ – Conference champion; ^ – FCS playoff participant; *Jacksonville ineligible for PFL title and FCS playoffs due to matters regarding the PFL's financial aid rules

2015 Pioneer Football League standings
	Conf.			Overall
Team	W		L	W		L
Dayton +^	7	–	1	10	–	2
San Diego +	7	–	1	9	–	2
Jacksonville *	6	–	2	9	–	2
Morehead State	6	–	2	7	–	4
Butler	4	–	4	6	–	5
Drake	4	–	4	5	–	6
Marist	4	–	4	5	–	6
Campbell	3	–	5	5	–	6
Stetson	1	–	7	3	–	8
Valparaiso	1	–	7	2	–	9
Davidson	1	–	7	2	–	9
+ – Conference co-champions; ^ – FCS playoff participant; * Jacksonville ineligible for PFL title and FCS playoffs due to matters regarding the PFL's financial aid rules

2016 Pioneer Football League standings
	Conf.			Overall
Team	W		L	W		L
No. 19 San Diego $^	8	–	0	10	–	2
Dayton	7	–	1	9	–	2
Drake	6	–	2	7	–	4
Marist	5	–	3	5	–	6
Jacksonville	4	–	3	5	–	5
Campbell	3	–	4	5	–	5
Morehead State	3	–	5	4	–	7
Valparaiso	3	–	5	4	–	7
Butler	2	–	6	4	–	7
Stetson	2	–	6	4	–	7
Davidson	0	–	8	2	–	9
$ – Conference champion; ^ – FCS playoff participant; Rankings from STATS Poll

2017 Pioneer Football League standings
	Conf.			Overall
Team	W		L	W		L
No. 23 San Diego $^	8	–	0	10	–	3
Drake	6	–	2	7	–	4
Jacksonville	5	–	3	7	–	4
Campbell	5	–	3	6	–	5
Valparaiso	5	–	3	6	–	5
Butler	4	–	4	6	–	5
Dayton	4	–	4	5	–	6
Marist	3	–	5	4	–	7
Morehead State	3	–	5	4	–	7
Stetson	1	–	7	2	–	9
Davidson	0	–	8	2	–	9
$ – Conference champion; ^ – FCS playoff participant; Rankings from STATS Poll

2018 Pioneer Football League standings
	Conf.			Overall
Team	W		L	W		L
No. 25 San Diego $^	8	–	0	9	–	3
Stetson	6	–	2	8	–	2
Drake	6	–	2	7	–	4
Marist	5	–	3	5	–	6
Dayton	5	–	3	6	–	5
Davidson	3	–	5	6	–	5
Butler	2	–	6	4	–	7
Morehead State	2	–	6	3	–	8
Valparaiso	2	–	6	2	–	9
Jacksonville	1	–	7	2	–	8
$ – Conference champion; ^ – FCS playoff participant; Rankings from STATS Poll

2019 Pioneer Football League standings
	Conf.			Overall
Team	W		L	W		L
San Diego $^	8	–	0	9	–	3
Dayton	6	–	2	8	–	3
Drake	6	–	2	6	–	5
Davidson	5	–	3	8	–	4
Stetson	4	–	4	7	–	4
Marist	4	–	4	4	–	7
Morehead State	3	–	5	5	–	7
Butler	2	–	6	3	–	9
Jacksonville	1	–	7	3	–	9
Valparaiso	1	–	7	1	–	11
$ – Conference champion; ^ – FCS playoff participant

2020 Pioneer Football League standings
	Conf.			Overall
Team	W		L	W		L
Davidson $^	4	–	1	4	–	3
Valparaiso	4	–	2	4	–	2
San Diego	4	–	2	4	–	2
Morehead State	4	–	2	4	–	3
Drake	2	–	3	2	–	3
Stetson	0	–	4	0	–	4
Butler	0	–	6	0	–	6
Presbyterian	0	–	0	4	–	3
$ – Conference champion; ^ – FCS playoff participant; Notes: Due to COVID-19, the Pioneer Football League suspended the fall 2020 football season. Dayton and Marist opted out of the spring season. Presbyterian played a full PFL schedule, but was ineligible for the conference title, and its games were not counted in PFL standings.; Rankings from STATS Poll

2021 Pioneer Football League standings
	Conf.			Overall
Team	W		L	W		L
Davidson +^	7	–	1	8	–	3
San Diego +	7	–	1	7	–	4
St. Thomas (MN) *	6	–	2	7	–	3
Morehead State	6	–	2	7	–	4
Marist	5	–	3	5	–	5
Dayton	5	–	3	6	–	4
Valparaiso	4	–	4	4	–	7
Stetson	2	–	6	4	–	7
Drake	1	–	7	2	–	9
Butler	1	–	7	3	–	8
Presbyterian	0	–	8	2	–	9
+ – Conference co-champions; ^ – FCS playoff participant; * – St. Thomas (MN) ineligible for FCS postseason play due to transition from NCAA Division III

2022 Pioneer Football League standings
	Conf.			Overall
Team	W		L	W		L
St. Thomas (MN) * $	8	–	0	10	–	1
Dayton	6	–	2	8	–	3
Davidson ^	6	–	2	8	–	4
Butler	5	–	3	7	–	4
San Diego	4	–	3	5	–	5
Valparaiso	4	–	4	5	–	7
Marist	4	–	4	4	–	7
Drake	3	–	5	3	–	8
Stetson	2	–	5	4	–	6
Morehead State	1	–	7	2	–	9
Presbyterian	0	–	8	1	–	10
$ – Conference champion; ^ – FCS playoff participant; * – St. Thomas (MN) ineligible for FCS postseason play due to transition from NCAA Division III; Rankings from STATS Poll

2023 Pioneer Football League standings
	Conf.			Overall
Team	W		L	W		L
Drake $^	8	–	0	8	–	4
St. Thomas (MN) *	7	–	1	8	–	3
Davidson	6	–	2	7	–	4
Butler	5	–	3	7	–	4
Marist	4	–	4	4	–	7
San Diego	4	–	4	4	–	7
Morehead State	3	–	5	4	–	7
Presbyterian	2	–	6	4	–	7
Valparaiso	2	–	6	3	–	8
Dayton	2	–	6	4	–	7
Stetson	1	–	7	3	–	8
$ – Conference champion; ^ – FCS playoff participant; * – St. Thomas (MN) ineligible for FCS postseason play due to transition from NCAA Division III; Rankings from STATS Poll

2024 Pioneer Football League standings
	Conf.			Overall
Team	W		L	W		L
Drake $^	7	–	1	8	–	3
San Diego	6	–	2	8	–	3
Butler	5	–	3	9	–	3
Morehead State	5	–	3	7	–	5
St. Thomas (MN)*	5	–	3	6	–	6
Dayton	4	–	4	6	–	5
Davidson	4	–	4	6	–	5
Presbyterian	4	–	4	6	–	6
Valparaiso	2	–	5	4	–	7
Marist	1	–	7	1	–	10
Stetson	0	–	7	2	–	9
$ – Conference champion; ^ – FCS playoff participant; * – St. Thomas (MN) ineligible for FCS postseason play due to transition from NCAA Division III; Rankings from STATS Poll

2025 Pioneer Football League standings
	Conf.			Overall
Team	W		L	W		L
Drake $^	7	–	1	8	–	4
Presbyterian	6	–	2	10	–	2
San Diego	6	–	2	8	–	4
St. Thomas (MN)	5	–	3	7	–	5
Dayton	5	–	3	7	–	4
Morehead State	4	–	4	6	–	6
Butler	4	–	4	6	–	6
Marist	3	–	5	5	–	7
Stetson	2	–	6	3	–	9
Davidson	1	–	7	2	–	10
Valparaiso	1	–	7	2	–	10
$ – Conference champion; ^ – FCS playoff participant; Rankings from STATS Poll

2026 Pioneer Football League standings
	Conf.			Overall
Team	W		L	W		L
Butler	0	–	0	0	–	0
Davidson	0	–	0	0	–	0
Dayton	0	–	0	0	–	0
Drake	0	–	0	0	–	0
Marist	0	–	0	0	–	0
Morehead State	0	–	0	0	–	0
Presbyterian	0	–	0	0	–	0
San Diego	0	–	0	0	–	0
St. Thomas (MN)	0	–	0	0	–	0
Stetson	0	–	0	0	–	0
Valparaiso	0	–	0	0	–	0
Rankings from STATS Poll
