= John Russell =

John Russell may refer to:

== Arts and entertainment ==
- John Russell (English painter) (1745–1806)
- John Russell (Australian painter) (1858–1930)
- John Russell (screenwriter) (1885–1956), author and screenwriter
- John L. Russell (cinematographer) (1905–1967), American cinematographer
- Johnny Russell (saxophonist) (1909–1991), American jazz saxophonist
- John Russell (art critic) (1919–2008), British American art critic
- John Russell (actor) (1921–1991), American actor in the television series Lawman
- Johnny Russell (singer) (1940–2001), American country singer
- John Russell (musician) (1954–2021), acoustic guitarist
- John Morris Russell (born 1960), American conductor
- John C. Russell (1963–1994), playwright
- John Russell of Bluffdale (1793–1863), American novelist, writer and Baptist preacher
- John Wentworth Russell (1879–1959), Canadian painter
- Johnnie Russell (1933–2024), stage name of John R. Countryman, American diplomat and former child actor

== Military ==
- John Russell (Royalist) (1620–1687), English MP and soldier
- John Henry Russell (1827–1897), officer of the US Navy
- John Cecil Russell (1839–1909), British Army officer
- John Russell (Medal of Honor) (1852–?), US Navy sailor and recipient of the Medal of Honor
- John H. Russell Jr. (1872–1947), major general and 16th Commandant of the Marine Corps
- John Tinsley Russell (1904–1942), New Zealand soldier
- John Russell (VC) (1893–1917), British Army officer who was awarded the Victoria Cross
- John Russell (aviator) (1894–1960), flying ace
- John Russell, 3rd Baron Ampthill (1896–1973), British peer and Royal Navy officer
- John M. Russell, U.S. Army sergeant, perpetrator of the Camp Liberty killings (2009)

== Law and politics ==
=== United States ===
- John Russell (New York politician) (1772–1842), US representative from New York
- John Russell (prohibitionist) (1822–1912), first National Committee Chairman of the Prohibition Party
- John Russell (Ohio politician) (1827–1869), Ohio Secretary of State, 1868–1869
- John Russell (Virginia politician) (1923–2012), American politician
- John D. Russell (judge) (born 1963), judge of the US District Court for the Northern District of Oklahoma
- John D. Russell (politician) (born 1946), member of the Georgia House of Representatives
- John E. Russell (1834–1903), U.S. representative from Massachusetts
- John W. Russell Jr. (1923–2015), member of the Oklahoma House of Representatives from 1947 to 1951 and the Oklahoma Senate between 1952 and 1956
- John Russell (Missouri politician) (1931–2016), Missouri state senator
- John W. Russell (New York politician) (1874/5–1930)

=== United Kingdom ===
- Sir John Russell (knight) (died 1224), English household knight of King John
- Sir John Russell (died 1270), Anglo-Scottish noble
- John Russell (MP for Coventry), MP in 1302
- John Russell (died 1405) (1350s–1405), MP for Worcestershire
- John Russell (fl. 1410), MP for Wells
- John Russell (speaker) (died 1437), MP for Herefordshire and speaker of the House of Commons
- John Russell, 1st Earl of Bedford (1485–1555), English royal minister
- John Russell (Westminster MP), MP for Westminster, London, 1545–1547
- Sir John Russell, 3rd Baronet (1632?–1669), of Chippenham
- John Russell (Royalist) (1620–1687), English MP and soldier
- John Russell (colonial administrator) (1670–1735), administrator of the English East India Company
- John Russell, 4th Duke of Bedford (1710–1771), British statesman
- John Russell, 6th Duke of Bedford (1766–1839), Knight of the Garter
- John Russell, 1st Earl Russell (1792–1878), known as Lord John Russell before 1861, British prime minister
- John Russell, Viscount Amberley (1842–1876), progressive Liberal MP
- John Russell (diplomat) (1914–1984), British diplomat and ambassador
- John Russell, 13th Duke of Bedford (1917–2002), British peer and writer
- John Russell, 4th Earl Russell (1921–1987), eldest son of Bertrand Russell
- John Russell, 27th Baron de Clifford (1928–2018), peer of England
- John Russell, 7th Earl Russell (born 1971), English politician

=== Elsewhere ===
- John Watts-Russell (1825–1875), New Zealand politician

== Religion ==
- John Russell (bishop) (died 1494), bishop of Lincoln and Lord High Chancellor of England, 1483–1485
- John Russell (clergyman) (1626–1692), Puritan minister
- John Russel (1740-1817), Ayrshire minister parodied by Burns in The Holy Tulzie
- John Russell (headmaster) (1787–1863), English clergyman and headmaster of Charterhouse School
- John Russell (parson) (1795–1883), hunter, dog breeder, and cleric
- John Lewis Russell (1808–1854), American botanist and Unitarian minister
- John Fuller Russell (1814–1888), Church of England priest, writer, and art collector
- John Russell (priest, born 1868) (1868–1949), archdeacon of Oamaru / North Otago in New Zealand
- John Russell (priest, born 1792) (1792–1865), archdeacon of Clogher, Ireland
- John Joyce Russell (1897–1993), American prelate of the Roman Catholic Church

== Sports ==
=== Association football ===
- John Russell (footballer, born 1872) (1872–1905), Scottish footballer
- John Russell (Cambuslang footballer) (fl. 1890), Scottish footballer for Cambuslang and the national team
- John Russell (Dumbarton footballer) (fl. 1922–1928), Scottish footballer for Airdrie and Dumbarton
- John Russell (footballer, born 1923) (1923–2005), Scottish footballer (Motherwell FC, Kilmarnock FC)
- John Russell (Queen's Park footballer) (fl. 1924–1933), Scottish footballer
- John Russell (Irish footballer) (born 1985), for Sligo Rovers FC
- Johnny Russell (footballer) (born 1990), Scottish footballer (Dundee United, Derby County, Sporting KC, national team)
- Jon Russell (footballer) (born 2000), Jamaican footballer for Huddersfield Town, Chelsea and Accrington Stanley

=== Baseball ===
- John Russell (pitcher) (1895–1930), for the Brooklyn Robins and Chicago White Sox
- John Henry Russell (baseball) (1898–1972), American Negro leagues baseball player
- John Russell (catcher) (born 1961), manager of the Pittsburgh Pirates

=== Other sports ===
- John Russel (cricketer) (1849–1902), Scottish cricketer
- John Russell (English cricketer) (1883–1965)
- John Russell (Scottish cricketer) (1887–1965)
- Honey Russell (John David Russell, 1902–1973), American basketball player and coach
- John Russell (equestrian) (1920–2020), American Olympic bronze medal-winning equestrian
- John Russell (runner) (1932–2025), Australian long-distance runner
- John A. Russell (1933–2010), British Olympic rower
- John Russell (rower) (1935–2019), British Olympic rower
- John Russell (horse trainer) (1936–2004), American horse trainer

== Others ==
- John Russell (pirate) (fl. 1722–1723), possible alias of Portugal's Juan Lopez
- John Russell (collier) (1788–1873), British industrialist and colliery owner
- John Russell (advocate) (died 1613) Scottish lawyer and author
- John Russell (1796–1846), Scottish lawyer and travel writer, brother of James Russell
- John Scott Russell (1808–1882), Scottish naval engineer
- John Russell (developer) (1821–1896), Irish-American industrialist and developer of Ashland, Kentucky
- John Benjamin Russell (1834–1894), New Zealand lawyer, businessman, and landscape gardener
- E. John Russell (1872–1965), British agriculturalist
- John Henderson Russell (1884–?), American professor and author

== See also ==
- Jack Russell (disambiguation)
- Johnny Russell (disambiguation)
- Jonathan Russell (disambiguation)
- Jon Russell (One Life to Live), fictional character in the soap opera
- Jon Russell, a candidate in the United States House of Representatives elections in Washington, 2010
