= John Russ =

Jon or John Russ may refer to:

== Sports personalities ==
- John Russ (baseball) (1858–1912), American outfielder and pitcher
- John Russ (American football) (before 1880–after 1906), American college football coach
- John Russ, American player on 2013 Mercer Bears football team#Awards

== Others ==
- John Russ (politician) (1767–1833) American member of Congress from Connecticut
- John Dennison Russ (1801–1881), American physician
- Jon Russ, American composer; music for 2005's Moon Mary (Brownbrokers#Notable past productions)

== See also ==
- Jon-Russ Jaggesar (born 1986), Trinidadian cricketer
- Jonathan Russell (disambiguation)
- John Russell (disambiguation)
- John Russo (disambiguation)
- John Ross (disambiguation)
