= Jack Russell =

Jack Russell may refer to:

- Jack Russell Terrier, a type of dog

== People ==
- Jack Russell (American football) (1919–2006), American football end
- Jack Russell (baseball) (1905–1990), American baseball player
- Jack Russell (cricketer, born 1963) (born 1963), English cricketer and artist
- Jack Russell (cricketer, born 1887) (1887–1961), English cricketer
- Jack Russell (footballer) (1904–1995), English footballer in the 1920s and 1930s
- Jack Russell (Cork hurler) (born 1945), Irish hurler and coach
- Jack Russell (Wexford hurler) (born 1950), Irish hurler
- Jack Russell (musician) (1960–2024), American lead singer for the band Great White
- Jack Russell (priest) (1795–1883), English dog breeder and hunter
- Jack Russell (rower) (born 1930), Canadian who competed in rowing at the 1952 Summer Olympics
- Jack Russell (rugby union) (1909–1977), Irish international rugby union player
- Jack Russell, 25th Baron de Clifford (1884–1909), British army officer and nobleman

== Fictional characters ==
- Jack Russell, one of the alter egos of Werewolf by Night in Marvel Comics
- Jack Russell, a character in Bluey

== See also ==
- Jack Russell Memorial Stadium, a stadium in Clearwater, Florida
- John Russell (disambiguation)
