= Ruess =

Ruess or Rueß is a German surname. Notable people with the surname include:

- Paula Rueß (1902–1980), German political activist
- Everett Ruess (1914 – c. 1934), American artist, poet and writer
- Nate Ruess (born 1982), American singer-songwriter
- Paula Ruess (born 1999), German footballer

== See also ==
- Russ
