= Jonathan Russell =

Jonathan, Jon, Jonny or Johnny Russell may refer to:

== Music ==
- Jonathan Russell (composer) (born 1979), American composer and clarinetist
- Jonathan Russell (violinist) (born 1995), American jazz violinist

== Politics and government ==
- Jonathan Russell (diplomat) (1771–1832), American congressman from Massachusetts and ambassador
- Jonathan Russell (merchant) (1825–1876), American diplomat in the Philippines
- Jon Russell, Republican candidate in the United States House of Representatives elections in Washington, 2010

== Sports ==
- Johnny Russell (footballer) (born 1990), Scottish footballer
- Jon Russell (footballer) (born 2000), English footballer
- Jonny Russell (born 2004), Northern Irish footballer

== Characters ==
- Jon Russell (One Life to Live), American soap opera character portrayed by John Martin

== See also ==
- John Russell (disambiguation)
