= Jonathan Russell (merchant) =

Nineteenth century American merchant

- Born: 10 September 1825; Mendon, Massachusetts
- Died: 1876 (aged 50–51)
- Occupations: Merchant; diplomat
- Years active: 1835–1876
- Known for: Russell & Sturgis
- Children: 3
- Parents: Jonathan Russell (father); Lydia Smith Russell (mother)
- Relatives: George Robert Russell (half brother)

Jonathan Russell (1825–1876) was an American merchant and diplomat who spent most of his life in the Philippines.

== Early life ==
Russell was born in Mendon, Massachusetts on 10 September 1825, to Jonathan Russell and his second wife, Lydia Smith Russell. The elder Russell was a prominent early Republican statesman, serving as the American Chargé d'Affaires in Paris in 1810, and in London 1811–1814; the American Minister Plenipotentiary in Sweden 1814–1818; and a Member of Congress 1821–1825.

== Career ==
In 1846, aged 21 years, Jonathan Russell relocated to Manila to become a partner in Russell & Sturgis, a trading house co-founded in 1828 by his elder half-brother, George Robert Russell. George Russell travelled to Asia in the employ of Perkins & Company, an eminent trading house based in Canton and Salem, and established his own company in Manila after managing Perkins & Company’s affairs there. George Russell “retired from the Orient” in 1835, opening the way for his half-brother to follow in his footsteps. Jonathan Russell eventually became a senior partner in the firm. Russell & Sturgis was one of the two largest American trading houses in the Philippines, and, in addition to conducting international trade in hemp and other commodities, served as a de facto bank for local investors.

In 1857, Russell invested heavily in a steam-powered cordage factory outside of Manila, established by one of his compatriots. In addition, he and his business partner, Edward H. Green, served as acting U.S. Consuls from 1861 through 1864. Russell received an official appointment as Vice Consul in 1864 (although his official supervisor was a political appointee who never left Washington D.C.).

Russell “gave big dinners and receptions, almost nightly, and kept practically open house at Manila, where the fame of his social activity spread over the archipelago, giving a reputation for wealth and prominence to his concern [Russell & Sturgis] that dwarfed all competitors.”

== Death and legacy ==
Russell fathered three children, who remained in the Philippines after his death in 1876. As Russell was listed as “unmarried”, his children were not recognized in the United States. (Note: Russell excluded his children from his will, which left his estate to be divided between his two sisters and a nephew. The children successfully petitioned the judge overseeing Russell’s estate for a small share of the estate, about $5,000.)

In 1872, Russell & Sturgis was doing sufficiently well that Russell paid $250,000 for a share of the firm owned by Edward H. Green, (Note: Edward H. Green was the husband of Hetty Green, a notoriously miserly businesswoman.) a longtime friend and business partner. The following year, British diplomatic pressure forced the Spanish government to permit British banks to extend their operations to the Philippines. Competition with these banks forced Russell & Sturgis into bankruptcy in 1876, shortly after Russell’s death. Russell’s executors discovered that he owned less than $160,000 worth of property, but was liable for nearly $70,000 in personal debts, and partly liable for the more than $1.5 million that the bankrupt Russell & Sturgis owed to its creditors. The majority of the estate paid Russell’s outstanding debt to Green.
