= Jim Parady =

American football player and coach (born 1961)

Biographical details
- Born: April 30, 1961 (age 65)

Playing career
- 1979–1982: Maine
- Position: Quarterback

Coaching career (HC unless noted)
- 1983–1984: Colby (WR)
- 1985: Hamilton (QB)
- 1986–1987: Syracuse (GA)
- 1988: Brown (QB)
- 1989: Brown (WR)
- 1990: Northeastern (QB/WR)
- 1991: Marist (OC)
- 1992–2023: Marist

Head coaching record
- Overall: 155–171–1

Accomplishments and honors

Championships
- 3 MAAC (1994, 2006–2007); 1 PFL (2013)

James Parady (born April 30, 1961) is an American former college football coach. He served as head football coach at Marist College from 1992 to 2023, compiling a record of 155–171–1. At the time of his retirement on November 29, 2023, Parady was the longest-tenured coach head coach in NCAA Division I football. A native of Nashua, New Hampshire, Parady attended the University of Maine and is a member of Delta Tau Delta fraternity.

== Head coaching record ==
Year	Team	Overall	Conference	Standing	Bowl/playoffs
Marist Red Foxes (Liberty Football Conference) (1992)
1992	Marist	4–5–1	2–2–1	T–3rd	
Marist Red Foxes (NCAA Division I-AA independent) (1993)
1993	Marist	5–5			
Marist Red Foxes (Metro Atlantic Athletic Conference) (1994–2007)
1994	Marist	7–3	6–1	T–1st	
1995	Marist	6–4	4–3	T–3rd	
1996	Marist	7–3	6–2	3rd	
1997	Marist	6–4	4–3	T–3rd	
1998	Marist	7–3	6–2	T–3rd	
1999	Marist	6–5	5–3	4th	
2000	Marist	6–4	5–3	3rd	
2001	Marist	3–6	2–4	T–5th	
2002	Marist	7–4	5–3	T–2nd	
2003	Marist	4–6	2–3	T–3rd	
2004	Marist	3–6	3–1	2nd	
2005	Marist	7–4	3–1	2nd	
2006	Marist	4–7	3–1	T–1st	
2007	Marist	3–8	2–1	T–1st	
Marist Red Foxes (NCAA Division I FCS independent) (2008)
2008	Marist	4–7			
Marist Red Foxes (Pioneer Football League) (2009–2023)
2009	Marist	7–4	5–3	5th	
2010	Marist	3–8	2–6	T–7th	
2011	Marist	4–7	3–5	T–6th	
2012	Marist	4–7	3–5	T–6th	
2013	Marist	8–3	7–1	T–1st	
2014	Marist	4–7	4–4	T–5th	
2015	Marist	5–6	4–4	T–4th	
2016	Marist	5–6	5–3	4th	
2017	Marist	4–7	3–5	T–8th	
2018	Marist	5–6	5–3	T–4th	
2019	Marist	4–7	4–4	T–5th	
2020–21	No team—COVID-19				
2021	Marist	5–5	5–3	T–5th	
2022	Marist	4–7	4–4	T–6th	
2023	Marist	4–7	4–4	T–5th	
Marist:		155–171–1	116–86–1		
Total:		155–171–1			
National championship Conference title Conference division title or championship game berth
