= Dale Carlson =

American football player and coach

Biographical details
- Education: Concordia University Chicago

Playing career
- Position: Linebacker

Coaching career (HC unless noted)
- 1982–1983: Elmhurst (OL)
- 1984: Franklin (IN) (OL)
- 1985–1986: Grand Valley State (OL)
- 1987–1989: Lakeland
- 1990–1993: Taylor
- 1995–2002: Tri-State
- 2003–2009: Ohio Domican
- 2010–2013: Valparaiso
- 2014: North Park (AHC/WR/ST)
- 2015–2016: Lindenwood–Belleville
- 2018-2019: Washington University (TE)

Head coaching record
- Overall: 117–159–3
- Tournaments: 3–3 (NAIA playoffs)

Dale Carlson is an American football coach and former college player. He served as the head football coach at Lakeland College—now known as Lakeland University—in Plymouth, Wisconsin, from 1987 to 1989, Taylor University from 1990 to 1993, Tri-State University—now known as Trine University—from 1995 to 2002, Ohio Dominican University from 2003 to 2009, and Valparaiso University from 2010 to 2013, and Lindenwood University – Belleville from 2015 to 2016. In 2021, Carlson was the wide receivers coach for the Linemen of the Spring League.

== Personal life ==
Carlson played linebacker during college at Concordia University Chicago, where he earned a Bachelor of Arts degree in physical education. He earned a Master of Science in Education from Chicago State University.

== Coaching career ==
Carlson began his coaching career as an offensive line coach at Elmhurst College from 1982 to 1984. He then moved to Franklin College for the 1984 season and Grand Valley State University from 1985 to 1987, serving in the same role as offensive line coach.

Carlson became the head coach at Lakeland College in Sheboygan, Wisconsin, in the spring of 1987. He spent three seasons with Lakeland, before taking the head coach position at Taylor University in Upland, Indiana.

After leaving Taylor, he was tasked with founding the football programs at Tri-State University, now known as Trine University. Carlson spent eight seasons guiding the team and led the team to 11 victories in 1998 plus an NAIA semifinal appearance and a top-three national ranking. He then led the Thunder to the Mid-States Football Association Mideast Conference title in 2001 and was named the conference Coach of the Year.

In 2003, Carlson was named head coach at Ohio Dominican University in Columbus, Ohio, and again placed in a position to build a football program at ODU like he did at Trine. Despite a 0–10 inaugural season, he quickly led the program into a prominent position in the NAIA and an undefeated regular season during the 2007 season and advanced to the quarterfinals of the national playoffs. The 2007 season also saw Carlson earn Conference Coach of the Year and was named the American Football Coaches Association Region II and American Football Monthly/Schutt Sports NAIA National Coach of the Year. Under Carlson, ODU led all of college football with an average of more than 50 points per game. While guiding the Panthers, Carlson produced five All-Americans, seven Academic All-Americans, and more than 90 All-Conference players in his six years.

Carlson was named the 16th head football coach in at Valparaiso University until his firing near the end of 2013 season. Following the stint with Valparaiso, Carlson returned to his native Chicago, Illinois, to serve as the assistant head coach at North Park University.

Carlson returned to head coaching in 2015 when he became the second head coach in program history at Lindenwood University – Belleville, The 2015 season, marked the first for the Lynx in the Mid-States Football Association.

Carlson has been active in the American Football Coaches Association and the Fellowship of Christian Athletes.

== Head coaching record ==
Year	Team	Overall	Conference	Standing	Bowl/playoffs
Lakeland Muskies (Illini–Badger Football Conference) (1987–1989)
1987	Lakeland	6–3	3–2	3rd	
1988	Lakeland	5–5	3–1	2nd	
1989	Lakeland	2–7–2	1–5	9th	
Lakeland:		13–15–2	7–8		
Taylor Trojans (Indiana Collegiate Athletic Conference) (1990)
1990	Taylor	5–5	2–5	T–6th	
Taylor Trojans (NAIA Division II independent) (1991)
1991	Taylor	3–7			
1992	Taylor	2–7–1			
1993	Taylor	4–7			
Taylor:		14–26–1	2–5		
Tri-State Thunder (NAIA independent) (1995–2002)
1995	Tri-State	2–5			
1996	Tri-State	4–6			
1997	Tri-State	4–6			
1998	Tri-State	11–3			L NAIA Semifinal
1999	Tri-State	6–4			
2000	Tri-State	6–5			
2001	Tri-State	8–3			L NAIA First Round
2002	Tri-State	6–3			
Tri-State:		47–35			
Ohio Dominican Panthers (Mid-States Football Association) (2004–2008)
2004	Ohio Dominican	0–10	0–7	8th (MEL)	
2005	Ohio Dominican	3–7	2–5	T–6th (MEL)	
2006	Ohio Dominican	7–3	4–2	T–2nd (MEL)	
2007	Ohio Dominican	12–1	7–0	1st (MEL)	L NAIA Quarterfinal
2008	Ohio Dominican	7–3	4–2	T–2nd (MEL)	
Ohio Dominican Panthers (NCAA Division II independent) (2009)
2009	Ohio Dominican	7–3			
Ohio Dominican:		36–27	17–16		
Valparaiso Crusaders (Pioneer Football League) (2010–2013)
2010	Valparaiso	0–11	0–8	10th	
2011	Valparaiso	1–10	1–7	10th	
2012	Valparaiso	1–10	1–7	9th	
2013	Valparaiso	1–9 (Note: Carson was fired before the final game of the 2013 season. Assistant coach Mike Gravier served as interim head coach for the final game. Valparaiso finished 1–10 overall and 1–7 in Pioneer Football League play, tying for ninth place.)	1–6		
Valparaiso:		3–40	3–28		
Lindenwood–Belleville Lynx (Mid-States Football Association) (2015–2016)
2015	Lindenwood–Belleville	4–6	2–4	T–4th (MEL)	
2016	Lindenwood–Belleville	0–10	0–6	7th (MEL)	
Lindenwood–Belleville:		4–16	2–10		
Total:		117–159–3			
