= Russ (disambiguation) =

Russ is a masculine given name and a surname. It may also refer to:

- Russ, an obsolete name for Russians or Muscovites
- Russ (rapper), American rapper
- Russ Millions, British rapper formerly known solely as Russ
- Russ (Norwegian celebrant), participant(s) in the traditional Norwegian high school graduation ceremony russefeiring
- Russ, Bas-Rhin, a commune in Alsace, France
- Russ, Missouri, a community in the United States
- Russ, Hungarian name for Ruşi village, Bretea Română Commune, Hunedoara County, Romania
- Gotland Russ, a breed of Swedish pony
- Russ Prize, awarded by the United States National Academy of Engineering from 2001 to 2011
- Russ, a quasi-virus advertisement for Virus: The Game
- Russ' Restaurants, a chain of casual dining restaurants based in West Michigan, United States
