= John Stevenson Stubbs =

British flying ace (1894–1963)

- Born: 24 September 1894; Walton, Liverpool, Lancashire, England
- Died: 17 October 1963 (aged 69); Lake Cottage, Darland, Rossett, Wrexham
- Military career
- Allegiance: United Kingdom
- Branch: Aviation
- Rank: Captain
- Nickname: Jack
- Unit: No. 103 Squadron RAF
- Awards: Distinguished Flying Cross, Air Force Cross

Captain John Stevenson Stubbs DFC AFC was an English First World War flying ace credited with 11 official victories. He was a pioneering bomber pilot who was the war's leading ace for the British Airco DH.9. He also carried off the rather unusual feat of destroying an enemy observation balloon with a bomber.

== Early life ==
John Stevenson Stubbs was born on 24 September 1894. He was named after his father, who was a grocer. His mother was Jessie Stubbs. They were living at 235 County Road, Walton-on-the-Hill, Lancashire, England at the time the child was christened. (There is a discrepancy between the birth certificate [235] and the baptism record transcription [225] as to the house number of the family home).

The younger John Stevenson Stubbs attended Longmoor Lane School, followed by a year's enrollment at St. Bees School for 1910.

== World War I ==
Stubbs enlisted in the 3rd Battalion, South Lancashire Regiment to serve in World War I. On 26 January 1916, he was promoted to temporary lieutenant. On 4 January 1917, he was appointed a Flying Officer with orders to remain seconded from the Garrison Battalion, Liverpool Regiment.

Stubbs served in France with No. 27 Squadron RFC (later No. 27 Squadron RAF) from 24 February until 9 May 1917 when he was wounded. He was repatriated on medical grounds in July 1917.

After he recovered from his injuries, he was posted to No 2 Training Depot, Lake Down, near Salisbury, 19 September 1917 where he worked as an instructor until 24 March 1918. He was promoted to Acting Flight Commander on 9 October 1917. While stationed at Lake Down, he was posted to No. 107 Squadron RAF on 4 December 1917.

Stubbs was appointed Captain in the newly formed Royal Air Force on 21 April 1918 (the RAF was formed on 1 April 1918). Stubbs was posted to No. 103 Squadron RAF in the RAF as an Airco DH.9 pilot on the same date that he was appointed Captain on 21 April 1918. He left Lake Down for active service in France on 9 May 1918. He scored his first aerial victory–a highly unusual one– on 20 May 1918; despite flying a bomber, he and his observer destroyed an enemy observation balloon over Seclin.

On 6 June 1918, Stubbs and his observer, along with two other Royal Air Force air crews, set a German Fokker D.VII fighter aflame and sent another down out of control southwest of Ham, Surrey. On 4 July, Stubbs and his observer drove a Pfalz D.III fighter down out of control. On the 31st, with John Bernard Russell manning the observer's guns, Stubbs was credited with driving down two more enemy planes out of control.

On 25 August, Stubbs and Russell repeated the feat of destroying one Fokker D.VII and driving another down out of combat. Five days later, Stubbs drove down one more Fokker D.VII. He would go on to destroy two more Fokker D.VIIs, on 6 September and 30 October 1918. Stubbs had succeeded in becoming the ranking ace on the lightly regarded Airco DH.9 bomber.

On 2 November 1918, Stubbs was awarded the Air Force Cross. On that same day, his Distinguished Flying Cross was gazetted:

"Captain Stubbs is a fine leader and a skilful tactician, who during the last few months, has led fifty-one reconnaissances and raids over enemy lines with marked success, frequently extricating his formation, when attacked by large numbers of scouts, by his coolness and judgment. One evening this officer, with Lt. Russell as Observer, in company with another machine, encountered ten enemy aeroplanes. Regardless of their superiority in numbers, he at once attacked and shot down one. By skilful manoeuvring he enabled his Observer to bring down another; the remainder of the enemy were driven down to their lines; he then completed his reconnaissance and returned home. Leaving the other machine behind, he again crossed the enemy lines; he bombed a trail and attacked some mechanical transport at 1,500 ft. altitude. This particular exploit is highly creditable to both these officers, the machine in which they flew being unsuitable for low bombing attacks; moreover, they were subjected to very heavy anti-aircraft and machine-gun fire."

== Post World War I ==
On 24 October 1919, Stubbs was granted a short service commission as a Flying Officer in the Royal Air Force. On 13 January 1920, he transferred to the RAF's unemployed list, which was tantamount to discharge. On 15 April 1921, he was restored to the active list for temporary duty. On 4 June 1921, he returned to the unemployed list after completion of temporary duty.

On 29 May 1923, he was granted probationary commission as a Class A Flying Officer in the RAF Reserves. On 19 June 1924, he transferred from Class A of the reserves to Class C.

Nothing more is known of John Stevenson Stubbs after that.
