= Russ =

Russ is a masculine given name, often a short form of Russell, and also a surname.

== People ==
=== Given name or nickname ===
- Russ (rapper) (born 1992), American rapper, real name Russell James Vitale
- Russ Abbot (born 1947), British musician, comedian and actor
- Russ Adams (born 1980), American retired baseball player
- Russ Altman, American biomedical scientist and academic
- Russ Ballard (born 1945), English musician
- Russ Banham (born 1954), American author
- Russ Barenberg (born 1950), American bluegrass musician
- Russ Brandon (born 1967), American sports executive
- Russ Baker (born 1958), American author and investigative journalist
- Russ Carnahan (born 1958), American politician
- Russ Cochran (born 1958), American professional golfer
- Russ Cochran (1937–2020), American comics publisher
- Russ Columbo (1908–1934), American baritone, songwriter, violinist, and actor
- Russ Conway (1925–2000), stage name of Trevor Stanford, English popular music pianist
- Russ Crandall (born 1980), American YouTuber and former food blogger and writer
- Russ Dallen (1963–2021), American economist, financial advisor, lawyer, publisher, and journalist
- Russ Decker (born 1953), American politician
- Russ Dugger (born 1975), American professional stock car racing driver
- Russ Emanuel, American director, producer, and filmmaker
- Russ Ewing (1923–2019), American broadcast journalist
- Russ Feingold, American politician
- Russ Freeman (pianist) (1926–2002), American bebop jazz pianist and composer
- Russ Freeman (guitarist) (born 1960), American jazz fusion guitarist, composer and bandleader
- Russ Gibb (1931–2019), American rock music promoter, disc jockey, and public school teacher
- Russ Granik, longtime Deputy Commissioner of the National Basketball Association
- Russ Grimm (born 1959), American retired football player
- Russ Hodge (1939–2026), American decathlete, world record holder (1966–1967)
- Russ Howard (born 1956), Canadian curler
- Russ Huxtable, American politician from Delaware
- Russ Irwin (born 1968), American singer-songwriter
- Russ Kun (born 1975), President of Nauru (2022–)
- Russ Letlow (1913–1987), American football player
- Russ Malkin (born 1960), British film producer and creative director
- Russ Method (1897–1971), American football player
- Russ Meyer (1922–2004), American film director, producer and screenwriter
- Russ Meyer (baseball) (1923–1998), American baseball pitcher
- Russ Peterson (gridiron football) (1905–1971), American football player
- Russ Peterson (coach), American college basketball, football and baseball coach
- Russ W. Peterson (1916–2011), American politician
- Russ Ptacek (born 1963), American journalist
- Russ Roberts (born 1954), American economist
- Russ Smith (guard) (1893–1958), American football player
- Russ Smith (running back) (1944–2001), American football player
- Russ Smith (basketball) (born 1991), American basketball player
- Russ Smith (publisher) (born 1955), American newspaper publisher and columnist
- Russ Snyder (born 1934), American retired baseball player
- Russ Tamblyn (born 1934), American actor
- Russ Thomas (1924–1991), American football player
- Russ Washington (1946–2021), American football player
- Russ Weeks (1942–2024), American politician, Republican State Senator from West Virginia
- Russ Westbrook (born 1988), American basketball player
- Russ Witherby (born 1962), American coach and former ice dancer
- Russ Yeast (born 1999), American football player

=== Surname ===
- Hannah Russ, zooarchaeologist
- Joanna Russ (1937–2011), American feminist science fiction author
- John Russ (disambiguation), several people
- Karl Russ (1833–1899), German aviculturist and writer
- Marco Russ (born 1985), German footballer
- Martin Faxon Russ (1931–2010), American author and professor
- Robert Russ (painter) (1847–1922), Austrian painter
- Robert D. Russ (1933–1997), United States Air Force general
- Semp Russ (1878–1978), American college football quarterback and tennis player in the 1904 Olympics
- Tim Russ (born 1956), American actor
- William Russ (born 1950), American actor

== Fictional characters ==
- Russ Owen, on the British soap opera Hollyoaks
- Russ, a walrus plumber supporting character from the Disney animated film, Zootopia 2

== See also ==
- Rus (disambiguation)
- Russell (disambiguation)
- Russell (given name)
- Russell (surname)
