= 2013 NCAA Division I FCS football season =

American college football season

2013 NCAA Division I FCS season

Regular season
- Number of teams: 127
- Duration: August 29 – November 23
- Payton Award: Jimmy Garoppolo, QB, Eastern Illinois
- Buchanan Award: Brad Daly, DE, Montana State

Playoff
- Duration: November 30 – December 21
- Championship date: January 4, 2014
- Championship site: Toyota Stadium, Frisco, TX
- Champion: North Dakota State

NCAA Division I FCS football seasons
- «2012 2014»

The 2013 NCAA Division I FCS football season, part of college football in the United States, was organized by the National Collegiate Athletic Association (NCAA) at the Division I Football Championship Subdivision (FCS) level. The season began on August 29, 2013, and concluded with the 2014 NCAA Division I Football Championship Game on January 4, 2014, at Toyota Stadium in Frisco, Texas. North Dakota State won its third consecutive title, defeating Towson, 35–7.

== Conference changes and new programs ==
School	2012 Conference	2013 Conference
Abilene Christian	Lone Star (D-II)	FCS Independent
Albany	NEC	CAA
Charlotte	New program	FCS Independent
Georgia State	CAA	Sun Belt (FBS)
Houston Baptist	New program	FCS Independent
Incarnate Word	Lone Star (D-II)	FCS Independent
Mercer	Revived program	Pioneer
Monmouth	NEC	FCS Independent
Old Dominion	CAA	FCS Independent
Stetson	Revived program	Pioneer
Stony Brook	Big South	CAA

== Other notable changes ==
- The Pioneer Football League joined the conferences receiving an automatic bid into the FCS playoffs, which increased from 20 to 24 teams in 2013.
- Under a standard provision of NCAA rules, all FCS programs were allowed to play 12 regular-season games (not counting conference title games) in 2013, and also in 2014. In years when the period starting with the Thursday before Labor Day and ending with the final Saturday in November contains 14 Saturdays, FCS programs may play 12 games instead of the regular 11. After 2014, the next season in which 12-game seasons are allowed will be 2019.

== FCS team wins over FBS teams ==
(FCS rankings from the Sports Network poll; FBS rankings from the AP Poll)

August 29: Southern Utah 22, South Alabama 21
August 29: No. 11 Towson 33, Connecticut 18
August 30: No. 1 North Dakota State 24, Kansas State 21
August 30: Samford 31, Georgia State 21
August 31: No. 21 Eastern Illinois 40, San Diego State 19
August 31: No. 4 Eastern Washington 49, No. 25 Oregon State 46 (NOTE: this is the third time an FCS team has beat an FBS team that was ranked in the AP poll, after James Madison's victory over No. 13 Virginia Tech in 2010 and Appalachian State's upset of No. 5 Michigan in 2007).
August 31: McNeese State 53, South Florida 21
August 31: No. 17 Northern Iowa 28, Iowa State 20
September 7: Chattanooga 42, Georgia State 14
September 7: Maine 24, Massachusetts 14
September 7: Nicholls State 27, Western Michigan 23
September 14: No. 23 Bethune–Cookman 34, Florida International 13
September 14: Fordham 30, Temple 29
September 21: Jacksonville State 32, Georgia State 26 ^{OT}
November 9: Old Dominion 59, Idaho 38
November 23: Georgia Southern 26, Florida 20

== Conference standings ==
2013 Big Sky Conference football standings
	Conf.			Overall
Team	W		L	W		L
No. 3 Eastern Washington $^	8	–	0	12	–	3
No. 5 Northern Arizona ^	7	–	1	9	–	3
No. 8 Montana ^	6	–	2	10	–	3
No. 21 Southern Utah ^	5	–	3	8	–	5
No. 20 Montana State	5	–	3	7	–	5
Cal Poly	5	–	3	6	–	6
UC Davis	5	–	3	5	–	7
Sacramento State	4	–	4	5	–	7
Portland State	3	–	5	6	–	6
North Dakota	2	–	6	3	–	8
Idaho State	1	–	7	3	–	9
Weber State	1	–	7	2	–	10
Northern Colorado	0	–	8	1	–	11
$ – Conference champion; ^ – FCS playoff participant; Rankings from The Sports Network poll

2013 Big South Conference football standings
	Conf.			Overall
Team	W		L	W		L
No. 7 Coastal Carolina +^	4	–	1	12	–	3
Liberty +	4	–	1	8	–	4
No. 24 Charleston Southern	3	–	2	10	–	3
Gardner–Webb	2	–	3	7	–	5
Presbyterian	1	–	4	3	–	8
VMI	1	–	4	2	–	10
+ – Conference co-champions; ^ – FCS playoff participant; Rankings from The Sports Network poll

2013 Colonial Athletic Association football standings
	Conf.			Overall
Team	W		L	W		L
No. 12 Maine $^	7	–	1	10	–	3
No. 2 Towson ^	6	–	2	13	–	3
No. 5 New Hampshire ^	6	–	2	10	–	5
Villanova	5	–	3	6	–	5
Delaware	4	–	4	7	–	5
William & Mary	4	–	4	7	–	5
Richmond	4	–	4	6	–	6
James Madison	3	–	5	6	–	6
Stony Brook	3	–	5	5	–	6
Rhode Island	2	–	6	3	–	9
Albany	0	–	8	1	–	11
$ – Conference champion; ^ – FCS playoff participant; Rankings from The Sports Network poll

2013 Ivy League football standings
	Conf.			Overall
Team	W		L	W		L
Harvard +	6	–	1	9	–	1
Princeton +	6	–	1	8	–	2
Dartmouth	5	–	2	6	–	4
Brown	3	–	4	6	–	4
Yale	3	–	4	5	–	5
Penn	3	–	4	4	–	6
Cornell	2	–	5	3	–	7
Columbia	0	–	7	0	–	10
+ – Conference co-champions

2013 Mid-Eastern Athletic Conference football standings
	Conf.			Overall
Team	W		L	W		L
No. 16 Bethune–Cookman +^	7	–	1	10	–	3
No. 25 South Carolina State +^	7	–	1	9	–	4
Morgan State	5	–	3	5	–	7
Delaware State	5	–	3	5	–	6
North Carolina A&T	4	–	4	7	–	4
Howard	4	–	4	6	–	6
Hampton	4	–	4	4	–	8
North Carolina Central	3	–	5	5	–	7
Norfolk State	3	–	5	3	–	9
Florida A&M	2	–	6	3	–	9
Savannah State	0	–	8	1	–	11
+ – Conference co-champions; ^ – FCS playoff participant; Savannah State ineligible for FCS playoffs due to Academic Progress Rate sanctions; Rankings from The Sports Network poll

2013 Missouri Valley Football Conference standings
	Conf.			Overall
Team	W		L	W		L
No. 1 North Dakota State $^	8	–	0	15	–	0
No. 13 South Dakota State ^	5	–	3	9	–	5
No. 18 Youngstown State	5	–	3	8	–	4
Southern Illinois	5	–	3	7	–	5
Missouri State	5	–	3	5	–	7
Illinois State	4	–	4	5	–	6
South Dakota	3	–	5	4	–	8
Northern Iowa	3	–	5	7	–	5
Western Illinois	2	–	6	4	–	8
Indiana State	0	–	8	1	–	11
$ – Conference champion; ^ – FCS playoff participant; Rankings from The Sports Network poll

2013 Northeast Conference football standings
	Conf.			Overall
Team	W		L	W		L
Sacred Heart +^	4	–	2	10	–	3
Duquesne +	4	–	2	7	–	4
Robert Morris	3	–	3	5	–	6
Saint Francis (PA)	3	–	3	5	–	6
Bryant	3	–	3	5	–	7
Central Connecticut	2	–	4	4	–	8
Wagner	2	–	4	3	–	8
+ – Conference co-champions; ^ – FCS playoff participant

2013 Ohio Valley Conference football standings
	Conf.			Overall
Team	W		L	W		L
No. 4 Eastern Illinois $^	8	–	0	12	–	2
No. 17 Tennessee State ^	6	–	2	10	–	4
No. 10 Jacksonville State ^	5	–	3	11	–	4
UT Martin	5	–	3	7	–	5
Eastern Kentucky	4	–	4	6	–	6
Murray State	4	–	4	6	–	6
Tennessee Tech	2	–	6	5	–	7
Southeast Missouri State	2	–	6	3	–	9
Austin Peay	0	–	8	0	–	12
$ – Conference champion; ^ – FCS playoff participant; Rankings from The Sports Network poll

2013 Patriot League football standings
	Conf.			Overall
Team	W		L	W		L
Lafayette $^	4	–	1	5	–	7
Lehigh	3	–	2	8	–	3
Bucknell	3	–	2	6	–	5
Colgate	3	–	2	4	–	8
Holy Cross	1	–	4	3	–	9
Georgetown	1	–	4	2	–	9
No. 9 Fordham ^	0	–	0	12	–	2
$ – Conference champion; ^ – FCS playoff participant; Fordham was ineligible for conference title because they previously offered football scholarships while other Patriot League members did not.; Rankings from The Sports Network poll

2013 Pioneer Football League standings
	Conf.			Overall
Team	W		L	W		L
Marist +	7	–	1	8	–	3
Butler +^	7	–	1	9	–	4
Mercer	6	–	2	10	–	2
Dayton	5	–	3	7	–	4
Drake	5	–	3	6	–	5
Jacksonville	4	–	4	5	–	6
Morehead State	3	–	5	3	–	9
Campbell	2	–	6	3	–	9
Stetson	1	–	7	2	–	9
Valparaiso	1	–	7	1	–	10
Davidson	0	–	8	0	–	11
San Diego	0	–	0	8	–	3
+ – Conference co-champions; ^ – FCS playoff participant; San Diego declared itself ineligible for conference title because of improper scholarships for football players; it will have an official conference record of 0–0 and will not have a place in the conference standings.

2013 Southern Conference football standings
	Conf.			Overall
Team	W		L	W		L
No. 22 Furman +^	6	–	2	8	–	6
No. 19 Samford +^	6	–	2	8	–	5
No. 23 Chattanooga +	6	–	2	8	–	4
Georgia Southern *	4	–	4	7	–	4
Wofford	4	–	4	5	–	6
The Citadel	4	–	4	5	–	7
Appalachian State *	4	–	4	4	–	8
Elon	1	–	7	2	–	10
Western Carolina	1	–	7	2	–	10
+ – Conference co-champions; ^ – FCS playoff participant; * – Appalachian State and Georgia Southern ineligible for conference championship and FCS playoffs as part of FBS transition; Rankings from The Sports Network poll

2013 Southland Conference football standings
	Conf.			Overall
Team	W		L	W		L
No. 6 Southeastern Louisiana $^	7	–	0	11	–	3
No. 11 McNeese State ^	6	–	1	10	–	3
No. 14 Sam Houston State ^	4	–	3	9	–	5
Central Arkansas	4	–	3	7	–	5
Northwestern State	3	–	4	6	–	6
Lamar	2	–	5	5	–	7
Nicholls State	1	–	6	4	–	8
Stephen F. Austin	1	–	6	3	–	9
$ – Conference champion; ^ – FCS playoff participant; Rankings from The Sports Network poll

2013 Southwestern Athletic Conference football standings
	Conf.			Overall
Team	W		L	W		L
East Division
Jackson State xy	8	–	1	8	–	4
Alcorn State	7	–	2	9	–	3
Alabama State *	7	–	2	8	–	4
Alabama A&M	4	–	5	4	–	8
Mississippi Valley State *	2	–	7	2	–	9
West Division
Southern xy$	7	–	2	9	–	4
Prairie View A&M	5	–	4	6	–	6
Arkansas–Pine Bluff	2	–	7	2	–	9
Texas Southern *	2	–	7	2	–	9
Grambling State	1	–	8	1	–	11
Championship: Southern 34, Jackson State 27 ^{2OT}
$ – Conference champion; x – Division champion/co-champions; y – Championship game participant; * – ineligible for postseason

2013 NCAA Division I FCS independents football standings
	Conf.			Overall
Team	W		L	W		L
Old Dominion		–		8	–	4
Abilene Christian		–		6	–	5
Incarnate Word		–		6	–	5
Monmouth		–		6	–	6
Charlotte		–		5	–	6
Houston Baptist		–		3	–	4
Abilene Christian and Incarnate Word ineligible for FCS playoffs as part of reclassification from Division II; Charlotte and Old Dominion ineligible for FCS playoffs as part of FBS transition; Houston Baptist ineligible for FCS playoffs due to playing only a partial exhibition schedule

== Conference summaries ==
=== Championship games ===
Conference	Champion	Runner-up	Score	Offensive Player of the Year	Defensive Player of the Year	Coach of the Year
SWAC	Southern	Jackson State	34–27^{2OT}	Dray Joseph, QB, Southern; Arnold Walker, RB, Alcorn State	Jer-ryan Harris, LB, Arkansas-Pine Bluff	Dawson Odums, Southern

=== Other conference winners ===
Note: Records are regular-season only, and do not include playoff games.

Conference	Champion	Record	Offensive Player of the Year	Defensive Player of the Year	Coach of the Year
Big Sky	Eastern Washington	10–2 (8–0)	Vernon Adams, QB (Eastern Washington)	Brad Daly (Montana State); Sullivan Grosz (Cal Poly)	Beau Baldwin (Eastern Washington)
Big South	Coastal Carolina; Liberty	10–2 (4–1); 8–4 (4–1)	Lorenzo Taliaferro, RB (Coastal Carolina)	Quinn Backus, LB (Coastal Carolina)	
CAA	Maine	10–2 (7–1)	Terrance West, RB (Towson)	Stephon Robertson, LB (James Madison)	Jack Cosgrove (Maine)
Ivy	Harvard; Princeton	9–1 (6–1); 8–2 (6–1)	Quinn Epperly, QB (Princeton)	Zack Hodges, DE (Harvard)	
MEAC	Bethune–Cookman; South Carolina State	10–2 (7–1); 9–3 (7–1)	Greg McGhee, QB (Howard)	Joe Thomas, LB (South Carolina State)	Brian Jenkins (Bethune–Cookman)
MVFC	North Dakota State	11–0 (8–0)	Brock Jensen, QB (North Dakota State)	Tyler Starr, LB (South Dakota)	Craig Bohl (North Dakota State)
NEC	Sacred Heart; Duquesne	10–2 (4–2); 6–4 (4–2)	Keshaudas Spence, RB (Sacred Heart)	Troy Moore, DL (Sacred Heart)	Mark Nofri (Sacred Heart)
OVC	Eastern Illinois	11–1 (8–0)	Jimmy Garoppolo, QB (Eastern Illinois)	Anthony Bass, DE (Tennessee State)	Dino Babers (Eastern Illinois)
Patriot	Lafayette	5–6 (4–1)	Michael Nebrich, QB (Fordham)	Stephen Hodge, LB (Fordham)	Joe Moorhead (Fordham)
Pioneer	Butler; Marist	9–3 (7–1); 8–3 (7–1)	Mason Mills, QB (San Diego)	Terrence Fede, DE (Marist)	Jim Parady (Marist)
Southern	Chattanooga; Samford; Furman	8–4 (6–2); 8–4 (6–2); 7–5 (6–2)	Jacob Huesman, So., QB (Chattanooga)	Davis Tull, Jr., DL (Chattanooga)	Russ Huesman (Chattanooga)
Southland	Southeastern Louisiana	10–2 (7–0)	Bryan Bennett (Southeastern Louisiana) POY; Cody Stroud (McNeese State) OPOY	Cqulin Hubert (Southeastern Louisiana)	Ron Roberts (Southeastern Louisiana)

== Playoff qualifiers ==
=== Automatic berths for conference champions ===
- Big Sky Conference – Eastern Washington
- Big South Conference – Coastal Carolina
- Colonial Athletic Association – Maine
- Mid-Eastern Athletic Conference – Bethune–Cookman
- Missouri Valley Football Conference – North Dakota State
- Northeast Conference – Sacred Heart
- Ohio Valley Conference – Eastern Illinois
- Patriot League – Lafayette
- Pioneer Football League - Butler
- Southern Conference – Furman
- Southland Conference – Southeastern Louisiana

=== At large qualifiers ===
- Big Sky Conference - Montana, Northern Arizona, Southern Utah
- Big South Conference - None
- Colonial Athletic Association - New Hampshire, Towson
- Mid-Eastern Athletic Conference - South Carolina State
- Missouri Valley Football Conference - South Dakota State
- Northeast Conference - None
- Ohio Valley Conference - Jacksonville State, Tennessee State
- Patriot League - Fordham
- Pioneer Football League - None
- Southern Conference - Samford
- Southland Conference - McNeese State, Sam Houston State

=== Abstentions ===
- Ivy League – Princeton
- Southwestern Athletic Conference – Southern

== Postseason ==
After three seasons with a playoff field of twenty teams, the FCS bracket was expanded to 24 this postseason, with the eight seeded teams receiving first-round byes.

=== NCAA Division I playoff bracket ===
First Round
November 30
Campus sites

Second Round
December 7
Campus sites

Quarterfinals
December 13 and 14
Campus sites

Semifinals
December 20 and 21
Campus sites

National Championship Game

January 4
1:00 PM CST
Toyota Stadium,
Frisco, Texas
ESPN2
Dial Global Sports

Furman
7

Furman
30

1
North Dakota State*
38

South Carolina State*
20

1
North Dakota State*
48

Coastal Carolina
14

Coastal Carolina
42

Bethune–Cookman
24

8
Montana*
35

Coastal Carolina*
48

1
North Dakota State*
52

New Hampshire
14

Sam Houston State
29

Southern Utah
20

4
Southeastern Louisiana*
30

Sam Houston State*
51

4
Southeastern Louisiana*
17

New Hampshire
20

New Hampshire
41

Lafayette
7

5
Maine*
27

New Hampshire*
45

1
North Dakota State
35

7
Towson
7

Tennessee State
10

Tennessee State
31

2
Eastern Illinois*
51

Butler*
0

2
Eastern Illinois*
39

7
Towson
49

Fordham
28

Sacred Heart
27

7
Towson*
48

Fordham*
37

7
Towson
35

3
Eastern Washington*
31

South Dakota State
17

South Dakota State
26

3
Eastern Washington*
41

Northern Arizona*
7

3
Eastern Washington*
35

Jacksonville State
24

Jacksonville State
31

Samford
14

6
McNeese State*
10

Jacksonville State*
55

* Home team

== New, expanded, renovated, and temporary stadiums ==
- Albany made its CAA debut in Bob Ford Field, a new 8,500-seat on-campus stadium. University Field, which Albany had used for both football and track since 1970, is now solely a track venue.
- Charlotte made its football debut in Jerry Richardson Stadium, a new on-campus facility. Its initial capacity is 15,300, but it can be expanded to 25,000 with temporary seating. The stadium design allows future expansion to 40,000.
- Mercer plays at the Moye Complex, a new on-campus venue with a capacity of 10,200.
- Stetson plays at the already-existing Spec Martin Stadium, an off-campus stadium owned by Stetson's home city of DeLand, Florida. The stadium holds 6,000.

== Coaching changes ==
=== Preseason and in-season ===
This is restricted to coaching changes that took place on or after May 1, 2013. For coaching changes that occurred earlier in 2013, see 2012 NCAA Division I FCS end-of-season coaching changes.

School	Outgoing coach	Date	Reason	Replacement
North Carolina Central	Henry Frazier, III	August 22	Fired	Dwayne Foster (interim)
Grambling State	Doug Williams	September 11	Fired	George Ragsdale (interim)
Grambling State	George Ragsdale	October 17	Fired	Dennis Winston (interim)
Valparaiso	Dale Carlson	November 10	Fired	Mike Gravier (interim)

=== End of season ===
School	Outgoing coach	Date announced	Reason	Replacement
Albany	Bob Ford	August 13	Retired	Greg Gattuso
Rhode Island	Joe Trainer	November 18	Fired	Jim Fleming
North Dakota	Chris Mussman	November 18	Fired	Kyle "Bubba" Schweigert
Robert Morris	Joe Walton	November 21	Retired	John Banaszak
Central Connecticut	Jeff McInerney	November 25	Resigned	Peter Rossomando
James Madison	Mickey Matthews	November 25	Fired	Everett Withers
Elon	Jason Swepson	November 25	Fired	Rich Skrosky
Morgan State	Donald Hill-Eley	November 25	Fired	Lee Hull
Stephen F. Austin	J. C. Harper	November 25	Fired	Clint Conque
Southeast Missouri State	Tony Samuel	November 26	Fired	Tom Matukewicz
Weber State	Jody Sears	November 26	Fired	Jay Hill
Alabama A&M	Anthony Jones	December 1	Fired	James Spady
Colgate	Dick Biddle	December 2	Retired	Dan Hunt
Grambling State	Dennis Winston	December 4	Permanent replacement	Broderick Fobbs
North Dakota State	Craig Bohl	December 7	Hired by Wyoming	Chris Klieman
Mississippi Valley State	Karl Morgan	December 9	Fired	Rick Comegy
Valparaiso	Mike Gravier	December 11	Permanent replacement	Dave Cecchini
Drake	Chris Creighton	December 11	Hired by Eastern Michigan	Rick Fox
Central Arkansas	Clint Conque	December 14	Hired by Stephen F. Austin	Steve Campbell
The Citadel	Kevin Higgins	December 16	Hired by Wake Forest (Assistant)	Mike Houston
Hampton	Donovan Rose	December 17	Fired	Connell Maynor
Eastern Illinois	Dino Babers	December 18	Hired by Bowling Green	Kim Dameron
Jackson State	Rick Comegy	December 18	Fired	Harold Jackson
North Carolina Central	Dwayne Foster	December 19	Permanent replacement	Jerry Mack
Georgia Southern	Jeff Monken	December 24	Hired by Army	Willie Fritz
Sam Houston State	Willie Fritz	January 10	Hired by Georgia Southern	K. C. Keeler
Jacksonville State	Bill Clark	January 21	Hired by UAB	John Grass
Georgetown	Kevin Kelly	January 30	Resigned	Rob Sgarlata
Sacramento State	Marshall Sperbeck	April 25	Resigned	Jody Sears (interim)

== NFL draft selections ==
Listed below are all FCS players selected in the 2014 NFL Draft

Round	Selection	Player	Position	School	NFL team
2	62	Jimmy Garoppolo	Quarterback	Eastern Illinois	New England Patriots
3	67	Billy Turner	Offensive tackle	North Dakota State	Miami Dolphins
3	94	Terrance West	Running back	Towson	Cleveland Browns
3	96	Jerick McKinnon	Running Back	Georgia Southern	Minnesota Vikings
4	125	Walt Aikens	Cornerback	Liberty	Miami Dolphins
4	137	Dakota Dozier	Offensive Tackle	Furman	New York Jets
4	138	Lorenzo Taliaferro	Running Back	Coastal Carolina	Baltimore Ravens
5	143	Kadeem Edwards	Offensive Guard	Tennessee State	Tampa Bay Buccaneers
5	158	Caraun Reid	Defensive tackle	Princeton	Detroit Lions
5	171	Jordan Tripp	Outside linebacker	Montana	Miami Dolphins
6	184	Kendall James	Cornerback	Maine	Minnesota Vikings
6	190	Matt Hazel	Wide receiver	Coastal Carolina	Miami Dolphins
6	196	Walt Powell	Wide Receiver	Murray State	Arizona Cardinals
7	226	Mitchell Van Dyk	Offensive Tackle	Portland State	St. Louis Rams
7	234	Terrence Fede	Defensive end	Marist	Miami Dolphins
7	235	Shelby Harris	Defensive End	Illinois State	Oakland Raiders
7	250	Demetrius Rhaney	Center	Tennessee State	St. Louis Rams
7	252	Lavelle Westbrooks	Cornerback	Georgia Southern	Cincinnati Bengals
7	255	Tyler Starr	Outside Linebacker	South Dakota	Atlanta Falcons

== See also ==
- 2013 NCAA Division I FCS football rankings
