= Mike Gravier =

American football player and coach (born 1960)

Current position
- Title: Head coach
- Team: Hug HS (NV)
- Conference: NIAA 4A

Biographical details
- Born: September 27, 1960 (age 66)

Playing career
- ?: Grand Valley State

Coaching career (HC unless noted)
- 1988: Southeast Missouri State (WR)
- 1989–1991: Michigan Tech (QB/RB/WR)
- 1992–1994: Malone (OC)
- 1995–1998: Malone
- 2009: Concord (TE)
- 2011–2012: Bluefield
- 2013: Valparaiso (interim HC)
- 2014: Eastern Michigan (assistant)
- 2017–2018: North Park (associate HC / OL)
- 2019–present: Hug HS (NV)

Head coaching record
- Overall: 30–24–1 (college)
- Tournaments: 1–1 (NAIA D-II playoffs); 0–1 (NAIA playoffs)

Accomplishments and honors

Championships
- 3 MSFA Mideast League (1995–1996, 1998)

Mike Gravier (born September 27, 1960) is an American football coach and former player. He is the head football coach at Hug High School in Reno, Nevada, a position he had held since 2019. Gravier served as the head football coach at Malone College—now known as Malone University—in Canton, Ohio, from 1995 to 1998 and at Bluefield College in Bluefield, Virginia, in 2012. He was also the interim head football coach at Valparaiso University in Valparaiso, Indiana, for the final game of the 2013 season.

Gravier played college football at Grand Valley State University. At Malone, he led the Malone Pioneers football to significant victories early in the history of the program and an NAIA Division II playoff appearance in the program's third year.

== Coaching career ==
=== Malone ===
Gravier was the second head football coach at Malone College—now known as Malone University—in Canton, Ohio, serving for four seasons, from 1995 to 1998, and compiling a record of His career coaching record at Malone was 30–12–1. This ranks him first at Malone in total wins and first at Malone in winning percentage.

Gravier's success at Malone is supported by his first-year record of 10 wins, 1 loss, and 1 tie and included a victory over rival Geneva College. The sole loss came in the quarterfinal playoffs for the NAIA national championships. His team also reached the national championship hunt during his last season at Malone, losing to Georgetown College. Three of the four years he coached at Malone, his team was either league champion or co-champion. In spite of his success on the field, he was asked to resign by the administration a week before the season opening game of 1999 after allegations surfaced that he struck a student athlete during a practice session.

=== Assistant coaching ===
Prior to coaching at Malone, he was an assistant coach for the Michigan Tech Huskies and at Southeast Missouri State He also was an assistant at Malone under head coach Joe Palmisano, whom he replaced to be the head coach. He also worked as the tight ends coach at Concord University in Athens, West Virginia.

=== Bluefield College ===
Gravier was the head coach for the Bluefield College Rams in Bluefield, Virginia. The program participated in non-sanctioned "club play" for the 2011 season and joined the NAIA's Mid-South Conference beginning in the 2012 football season.

In their first season since 1941, the Bluefield Rams finished without a single win. Their record was 0–11 overall, recording 0–6 in conference play. In April 2013 during spring drills, he was fired by the school.

=== Valparaiso ===
Gravier became an assistant coach of the Valparaiso Crusaders for the 2013 season. When the head coach was fired with one game to go in the season, he was promoted to interim head coach for the final game. Valparaiso lost their final game that season.

At the end of the season, Dave Cecchini was hired as a full-time replacement and Gravier was fired shortly thereafter.

== Subsequent coaching jobs ==
During the 2014 season, Gravier served as an assistant coach at Eastern Michigan. After leaving the Eagles, he was out of college football. In 2017, he became the offensive line coach and associate coach at North Park In 2019, Gravier was hired as the head football coach at Hug High School in Reno, Nevada.

== Head coaching record ==
=== College ===
Year	Team	Overall	Conference	Standing	Bowl/playoffs	NAIA Coaches' Poll^{#}
Malone Pioneers (Mid-States Football Association) (1995–1998)
1995	Malone	10–1–1	3–0–1	1st (MEL)	L NAIA Division II Quarterfinal	
1996	Malone	8–2	5–1	T–1st (MEL)		
1997	Malone	5–5	3–3	4th (MEL)		
1998	Malone	7–4	5–1	1st (MEL)	L NAIA First Round	
Malone:		30–12–1	16–5–1			
Bluefield Rams (Mid-South Conference) (2012)
2012	Bluefield	0–11	0–6	6th		
Bluefield:		0–11	0–6			
Valparaiso Crusaders (Pioneer Football League) (2013)
2013	Valparaiso	0–1 (Note: Dale Carlson served as Valparaiso's head coach for the first 10 games of the 2013 season before he was fired. Gravier was promoted to interim head coach for the final game. Valparaiso finished 1–10 overall and 1–7 in Pioneer Football League play, tying for ninth place.)	0–1	T–9th		
Valpraiso:		0–1	0–1			
Total:		30–24–1				
National championship Conference title Conference division title or championship game berth
