= 2013 Stetson Hatters football team =

American college football season

2013 Stetson Hatters football
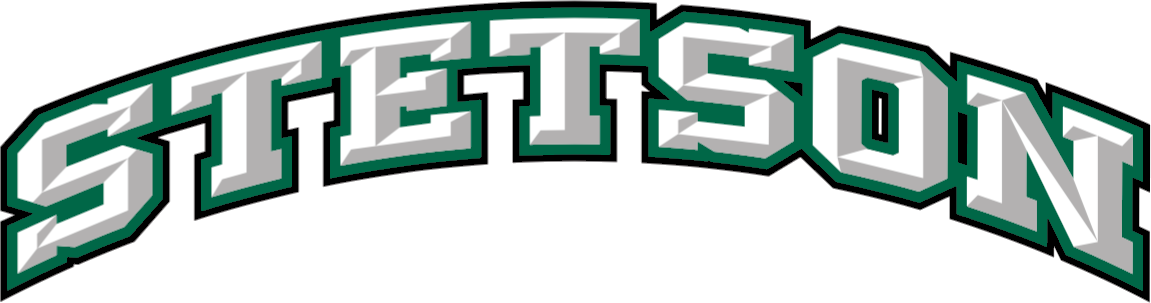
- Conference: Pioneer Football League
- Record: 2–9 (1–7 PFL)
- Head coach: Roger Hughes (1st season)
- Defensive coordinator: Brian Young (1st season)
- Home stadium: Spec Martin Stadium

2013 Pioneer Football League standings
	Conf.			Overall
Team	W		L	W		L
Marist +	7	–	1	8	–	3
Butler +^	7	–	1	9	–	4
Mercer	6	–	2	10	–	2
Dayton	5	–	3	7	–	4
Drake	5	–	3	6	–	5
Jacksonville	4	–	4	5	–	6
Morehead State	3	–	5	3	–	9
Campbell	2	–	6	3	–	9
Stetson	1	–	7	2	–	9
Valparaiso	1	–	7	1	–	10
Davidson	0	–	8	0	–	11
San Diego	0	–	0	8	–	3
+ – Conference co-champions; ^ – FCS playoff participant; San Diego declared itself ineligible for conference title because of improper scholarships for football players; it will have an official conference record of 0–0 and will not have a place in the conference standings.

The 2013 Stetson Hatters football team represented Stetson University as a member of the Pioneer Football League (PFL) during the 2013 NCAA Division I FCS football season. Led by first-year head coach Roger Hughes, the Hatters compiled an overall record of 2–9 with a mark of 1–7 in conference play, tying for ninth place in the PFL. Stetson played home games at Spec Martin Stadium on DeLand, Florida.

This was the first season in which Stetson sponsored football since 1956.

== Schedule ==
Date	Time	Opponent	Site	Result	Attendance
August 31	7:00 pm	Warner*	Spec Martin Stadium; DeLand, FL	W 31–3	6,479
September 7	7:00 pm	at Florida Tech*	Pirate Stadium; Palm Bay, FL	L 13–20	5,000
September 21	7:00 pm	Birmingham–Southern*	Spec Martin Stadium; DeLand, FL	L 34–49	6,104
September 28	1:00 pm	San Diego	Spec Martin Stadium; DeLand, FL	L 0–59	5,874
October 5	1:00 pm	at Butler	Butler Bowl; Indianapolis, IN	L 15–35	1,494
October 12	1:00 pm	Dayton	Spec Martin Stadium; DeLand, FL	L 20–49	5,116
October 26	1:00 pm	at Marist	Tenney Stadium at Leonidoff Field; Poughkeepsie, NY	L 0–27	1,826
November 2	1:00 pm	Campbell	Spec Martin Stadium; DeLand, FL	L 18–19	3,008
November 9	3:00 pm	Davidson^{†}	Spec Martin Stadium; DeLand, FL	W 26–13	6,544
November 16	1:00 pm	at Jacksonviile	D. B. Milne Field; Jacksonville, FL	L 24–45	2,983
November 23	1:00 pm	at Mercer	Moye Complex; Macon, GA	L 14–41	12,027
*Non-conference game; ^{†}Homecoming; All times are in Eastern time

== Game summaries ==
=== Warner ===
	1	2	3	4	Total
Royals	3	0	0	0	3
Hatters	3	21	7	0	31

=== At Florida Tech ===
	1	2	3	4	Total
Hatters	7	3	0	3	13
Panthers	0	3	3	14	20

=== Birmingham-Southern ===
	1	2	3	4	Total
Panthers	14	14	7	14	49
Hatters	7	21	6	0	34

=== San Diego ===
	1	2	3	4	Total
Toreros	14	21	17	7	59
Hatters	0	0	0	0	0

=== At Butler ===
	1	2	3	4	Total
Hatters	0	7	8	0	15
Bulldogs	7	2	21	5	35

=== Dayton ===
	1	2	3	4	Total
Flyers	28	14	7	0	49
Hatters	0	7	0	13	20

=== At Marist ===
	1	2	3	4	Total
Hatters	0	0	0	0	0
Red Foxes	7	6	14	0	27

=== Campbell ===
	1	2	3	4	Total
Fighting Camels	0	0	7	12	19
Hatters	2	3	0	13	18

=== Davidson ===
	1	2	3	4	Total
Wildcats	0	6	7	0	13
Hatters	0	3	13	10	26

=== At Jacksonville ===
	1	2	3	4	Total
Hatters	7	3	14	0	24
Dolphins	7	10	14	14	45

=== At Mercer ===
	1	2	3	4	Total
Hatters	0	14	0	0	14
Bears	3	14	17	7	41
