= Jonathan Russell (diplomat) =

American politician (1771–1832)

Member of the U.S. House of Representatives from Massachusetts's 11th district
- In office March 4, 1821 – March 3, 1823
- Preceded by: Benjamin Adams
- Succeeded by: Aaron Hobart

Chair of the United States House Committee on Foreign Affairs
- In office March 4, 1821 – March 3, 1823
- Preceded by: Office established
- Succeeded by: John Forsyth

Member of the Massachusetts House of Representatives from Mendon
- In office 1820–1822 Serving with Daniel Thurber
- Preceded by: Daniel Thurber
- Succeeded by: Daniel Thurber

U.S. Ambassador to Sweden and Norway
- In office January 8, 1814 – October 22, 1818
- Preceded by: None (position created)
- Succeeded by: Christopher Hughes

U.S. Minister to the Court of St James's (Chargé d'Affaires)
- In office July 27, 1811 – June 18, 1812
- Preceded by: William Pinkney
- Succeeded by: John Quincy Adams

Collector of the Port of Bristol, Rhode Island
- In office March 2, 1801 – February 23, 1804
- Preceded by: None (position created)
- Succeeded by: Charles Collins Jr.

Personal details
- Born: February 27, 1771 Providence, Rhode Island Colony, British America
- Died: February 17, 1832 (aged 60) Milton, Massachusetts, U.S.
- Resting place: Russell Family Cemetery (Milton, Massachusetts)
- Party: Democratic-Republican Party
- Spouses: Sylvia Ammidon (m. 1796; died 1811); Lydia Smith (m. 1817)
- Children: 8, including George and Jonathan
- Education: Rhode Island College
- Profession: Politician; diplomat

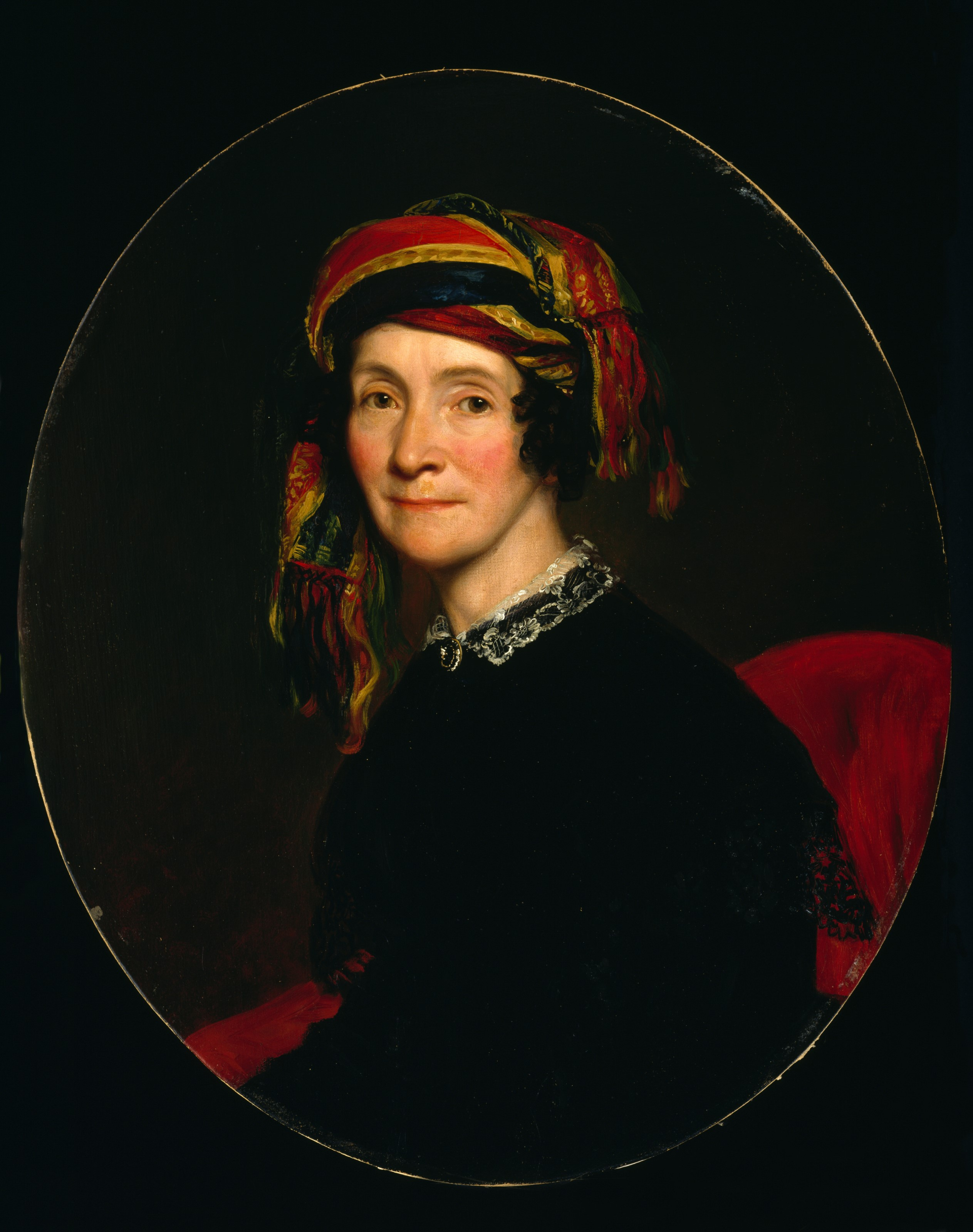
Portrait of Lydia Smith

Jonathan Russell (February 27, 1771 – February 17, 1832) was a United States representative from Massachusetts and diplomat. He served the 11th congressional district from 1821 to 1823 and was the first chair of the House Committee on Foreign Affairs.

== Early life ==
Jonathan Russell was born in Providence, Rhode Island on February 27, 1771, the son of Jonathan and Abigail (Russell) Russell. He attended the local schools and graduated from Rhode Island College (now Brown University) with a Bachelor of Arts in 1791 and a Master of Arts in 1794. He studied law and was admitted to the bar, but did not practice. He engaged in the mercantile business in partnership with Otis Ammidon, importing goods from Europe for sale in America. In 1801 he was appointed U.S. Collector of Customs for the Port of Bristol.

== Diplomatic career ==
In 1811, Russell was appointed by President James Madison as Chargé d'Affaires in Paris and he acted as Minister to France following the departure of John Armstrong Jr. and prior to the arrival of Armstrong's successor, Joel Barlow. He soon transferred to England, where he was Chargé d'Affaires and acting Minister when war was declared by the United States in 1812. He was Minister to Sweden and Norway from January 18, 1814 to October 16, 1818.

Russell was one of the five commissioners who negotiated the Treaty of Ghent with Great Britain in 1814, which ended the War of 1812. In 1817, Russell received the honorary degree of LL.D. from Brown University. He returned to the United States in 1818 and settled in Mendon, Massachusetts.

He became a member of the Massachusetts House of Representatives in 1820, and also served as a delegate to that year's state constitutional convention.

== Member of Congress ==
In November 1820, Russell was elected to the United States House of Representatives. He served in the Seventeenth Congress (March 4, 1821 – March 3, 1823), and was chairman of the Committee on Foreign Affairs, the first individual to hold this position.

== Feud with John Quincy Adams ==
In 1822, Russell authored a pamphlet accusing John Quincy Adams, one of Russell's fellow negotiators at Ghent in 1814, of having favored British interests in those treaty talks. Russell intended the pamphlet to further Henry Clay's presidential candidacy against Adams in the 1824 election. Adams's responsive pamphlets were so devastating in impugning Russell's veracity that they engendered the phrase "to Jonathan Russell" someone, meaning to refute an attacker's falsehoods so effectively that it destroys the attacker's reputation.

When the Marquis de Lafayette visited the United States in 1824 and 1825, his itinerary while in Massachusetts included an August 23, 1824 visit to Russell's home in Mendon. Russell had known Lafayette since 1811, and decorated his home for a lavish celebration with the anticipation of renewing their friendship. As United States Secretary of State and a longtime friend of Lafayette, Adams was part of Lafayette's traveling party. On the day of the planned visit, Adams humiliated Russell again by having the schedule changed without informing Russell, so that Lafayette bypassed Mendon and traveled directly to Providence.

== Later life ==
Russell died in Milton, Massachusetts on February 17, 1832. He was interred in the family plot on his estate in Milton.

== Family ==
In 1796, Russell married Sylvia Ammidon (1773–1811) of Mendon. In 1817, he married Lydia Smith (1786–1859). He was the father of eight children, four with each wife: Amelia, George, Caroline, Anna, Ida, Geraldine, Rosalie, and Jonathan.
