= 2013 Drake Bulldogs football team =

American college football season

2013 Drake Bulldogs football
- Conference: Pioneer Football League
- Record: 6–5 (5–3 PFL)
- Head coach: Chris Creighton (6th season)
- Offensive scheme: Multiple
- Defensive coordinator: Brad McCaslin (2nd season)
- Base defense: 4–3
- Home stadium: Drake Stadium

2013 Pioneer Football League standings
| | Conf. | | | Overall |
| Team | W | | L | W | | L |
|---|---|---|---|---|---|---|
| Marist + | 7 | – | 1 | 8 | – | 3 |
| Butler +^ | 7 | – | 1 | 9 | – | 4 |
| Mercer | 6 | – | 2 | 10 | – | 2 |
| Dayton | 5 | – | 3 | 7 | – | 4 |
| Drake | 5 | – | 3 | 6 | – | 5 |
| Jacksonville | 4 | – | 4 | 5 | – | 6 |
| Morehead State | 3 | – | 5 | 3 | – | 9 |
| Campbell | 2 | – | 6 | 3 | – | 9 |
| Stetson | 1 | – | 7 | 2 | – | 9 |
| Valparaiso | 1 | – | 7 | 1 | – | 10 |
| Davidson | 0 | – | 8 | 0 | – | 11 |
| San Diego | 0 | – | 0 | 8 | – | 3 |
+ – Conference co-champions; ^ – FCS playoff participant; San Diego declared itself ineligible for conference title because of improper scholarships for football players; it will have an official conference record of 0–0 and will not have a place in the conference standings.

The 2013 Drake Bulldogs football team represented Drake University as member of the Pioneer Football League (PFL) during the 2013 NCAA Division I FCS football season. Led by sixth-year head coach Chris Creighton, the Bulldogs compiled an overall record of 6–5 with a mark of 5–3 in conference play, tying for fourth place in the PFL. The team played home games at Drake Stadium in Des Moines, Iowa.

At the end of the season, Creighton resigned and became the head football coach at Eastern Michigan University.

== Schedule ==
| Date | Time | Opponent | Site | TV | Result | Attendance |
|---|---|---|---|---|---|---|
| August 29 | 6:00 pm | Grand View* | Drake Stadium; Des Moines, IA | | L 16–21 | 5,068 |
| September 7 | 4:00 pm | at No. 9 Northern Iowa* | UNI-Dome; Cedar Falls, IA (rivalry) | WOI 5.2 | L 14–45 | 15,960 |
| September 21 | 1:00 pm | Indianapolis* | Drake Stadium; Des Moines, IA | | W 31–14 | 4,259 |
| September 28 | 12:00 pm | at Mercer | Moye Complex; Macon, GA | | L 17–31 | 8,150 |
| October 5 | 1:00 pm | Jacksonville^{†} | Drake Stadium; Des Moines, IA | | W 27–17 | 3,121 |
| October 12 | 12:00 pm | at Davidson | Richardson Stadium; Davidson, NC | | W 27–6 | 2,347 |
| October 19 | 1:00 pm | at Butler | Butler Bowl; Indianapolis, IN | | L 14–24 | 1,576 |
| October 26 | 1:00 pm | Valparaiso | Drake Stadium; Des Moines, IA | | W 23–10 | 2,154 |
| November 2 | 1:00 pm | Morehead State | Drake Stadium; Des Moines, IA | | W 56–14 | 2,064 |
| November 9 | 1:00 pm | Dayton | Drake Stadium; Des Moines, IA (rivalry) | | W 36–10 | 2,456 |
| November 16 | 3:00 pm | at San Diego | Torero Stadium; San Diego, CA | | L 13–23 | 4,136 |
*Non-conference game; ^{†}Homecoming; Rankings from The Sports Network Poll released prior to the game; All times are in Central time
