= 2013 Marist Red Foxes football team =

American college football season

2013 Marist Red Foxes football
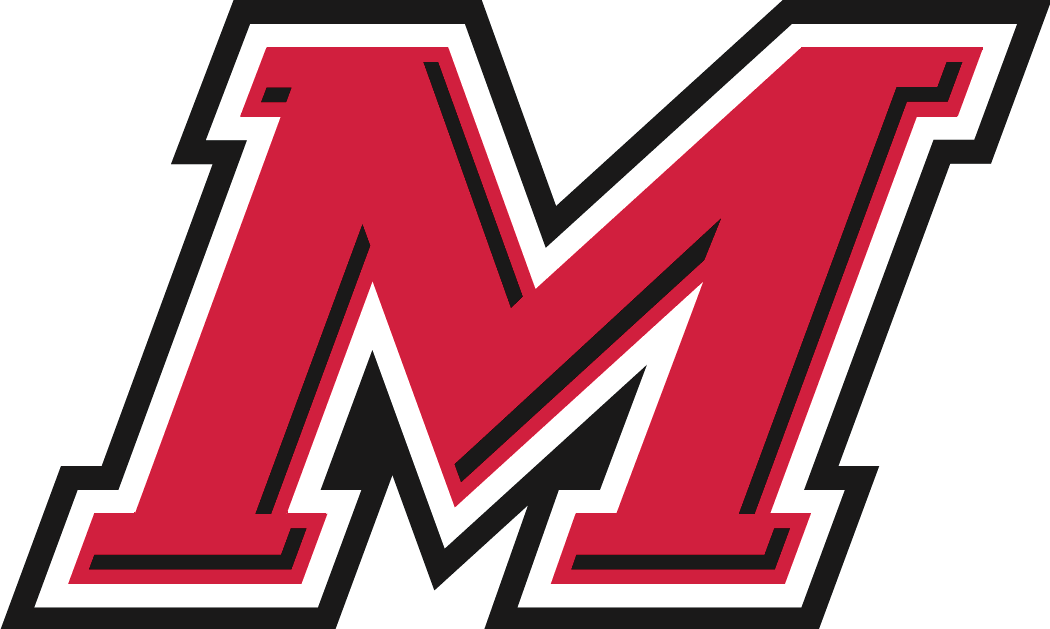

PFL co-champions
- Conference: Pioneer Football League
- Record: 8–3 (7–1 PFL)
- Head coach: Jim Parady (22nd season)
- Offensive coordinator: Nate Fields (1st season)
- Defensive coordinator: Scott Rumsey (14th season)
- Home stadium: Tenney Stadium at Leonidoff Field

2013 Pioneer Football League standings
	Conf.			Overall
Team	W		L	W		L
Marist +	7	–	1	8	–	3
Butler +^	7	–	1	9	–	4
Mercer	6	–	2	10	–	2
Dayton	5	–	3	7	–	4
Drake	5	–	3	6	–	5
Jacksonville	4	–	4	5	–	6
Morehead State	3	–	5	3	–	9
Campbell	2	–	6	3	–	9
Stetson	1	–	7	2	–	9
Valparaiso	1	–	7	1	–	10
Davidson	0	–	8	0	–	11
San Diego	0	–	0	8	–	3
+ – Conference co-champions; ^ – FCS playoff participant; San Diego declared itself ineligible for conference title because of improper scholarships for football players; it will have an official conference record of 0–0 and will not have a place in the conference standings.

The 2013 Marist Red Foxes football team represented Marist College as a member of the Pioneer Football League (PFL) during the 2013 NCAA Division I FCS football season. Led by 22nd-year head coach Jim Parady, the Red Foxes compiled an overall record of 8–3 and 7–1 in conference play, sharing the PFL title with Butler. Marist played home games at Tenney Stadium at Leonidoff Field in Poughkeepsie, New York. PFL teams were eligible to compete in the NCAA Division I Football Championship playoff for the first time in 2013. Butler and Marist did not play each other in the regular season, so the PFL used the College Sporting News' Gridiron Power Index to determine the league's automatic bid to the playoffs. Butler was selected, and Marist did not receive an at-large bid. The Red Foxes played their home games at Tenney Stadium at Leonidoff Field in Poughkeepsie, New York.

== Schedule ==
Date	Time	Opponent	Site	Result	Attendance
August 31	6:00 pm	Sacred Heart*	Tenney Stadium at Leonidoff Field; Poughkeepsie, NY	L 21–37	3,365
September 7	6:00 pm	at Bucknell*	Christy Mathewson–Memorial Stadium; Lewisburg, PA	L 14–27	4,509
September 14	6:00 pm	at Georgetown*	Multi-Sport Field; Washington, DC	W 42–23	1,813
September 28	1:00 pm	at Dayton	Welcome Stadium; Dayton, OH	W 31–20	5,146
October 5	12:00 pm	Valparaiso^{†}	Tenney Stadium at Leonidoff Field; Poughkeepsie, NY	W 37–0	2,089
October 12	5:00 pm	at San Diego	Torero Stadium; San Diego, CA	L 33–35	3,513
October 19	1:00 pm	at Davidson	Richardson Stadium; Davidson, NC	W 42–14	3,112
October 26	1:00 pm	Stetson	Tenney Stadium at Leonidoff Field; Poughkeepsie, NY	W 27–0	1,826
November 2	1:00 pm	Jacksonville	Tenney Stadium at Leonidoff Field; Poughkeepsie, NY	W 42–35	1,667
November 9	1:00 pm	at Campbell	Barker–Lane Stadium; Buies Creek, NC	W 55–28	2,820
November 16	1:00 pm	Mercer	Tenney Stadium at Leonidoff Field; Poughkeepsie, NY	W 33–7	2,613
*Non-conference game; ^{†}Homecoming; All times are in Eastern time
