= 2013 Davidson Wildcats football team =

American college football season

2013 Davidson Wildcats football
- Conference: Pioneer Football League
- Record: 0–11 (0–8 PFL)
- Head coach: Paul Nichols (1st season)
- Offensive coordinator: Mike LaFleur
- Defensive coordinator: Chad Creamer
- Home stadium: Richardson Stadium

2013 Pioneer Football League standings
	Conf.			Overall
Team	W		L	W		L
Marist +	7	–	1	8	–	3
Butler +^	7	–	1	9	–	4
Mercer	6	–	2	10	–	2
Dayton	5	–	3	7	–	4
Drake	5	–	3	6	–	5
Jacksonville	4	–	4	5	–	6
Morehead State	3	–	5	3	–	9
Campbell	2	–	6	3	–	9
Stetson	1	–	7	2	–	9
Valparaiso	1	–	7	1	–	10
Davidson	0	–	8	0	–	11
San Diego	0	–	0	8	–	3
+ – Conference co-champions; ^ – FCS playoff participant; San Diego declared itself ineligible for conference title because of improper scholarships for football players; it will have an official conference record of 0–0 and will not have a place in the conference standings.

The 2013 Davidson Wildcats football team represented Davidson College in the 2013 NCAA Division I FCS football season. They were led by first-year head coach Paul Nichols and played their home games at Richardson Stadium. They were a member of the Pioneer Football League. They finished the season 0–11, 0–8 in PFL play to finish in eleventh place.

== Schedule ==
Date	Time	Opponent	Site	TV	Result	Attendance
September 7	6:00 pm	at Georgetown*	Multi-Sport Field; Washington, D.C.	MC4	L 6–42	2,954
September 14	7:00 pm	Lenoir-Rhyne*	Richardson Stadium; Davidson, NC	MC4	L 18–34	5,317
September 21	2:00 pm	at Johnson C. Smith*	Irwin Belk Complex; Charlotte, NC	MC4	L 22–35	2,211
September 28	1:00 pm	at Morehead State	Jayne Stadium; Morehead, KY	MC4	L 14–45	2,341
October 5	1:00 pm	at Dayton	Welcome Stadium; Dayton, OH	MC4	L 8–40	2,376
October 12	1:00 pm	Drake	Richardson Stadium; Davidson, NC	MC4	L 6–27	2,347
October 19	1:00 pm	Marist^{†}	Richardson Stadium; Davidson, NC	MC4	L 14–42	3,112
October 26	1:00 pm	at Jacksonville	D. B. Milne Field; Jacksonville, FL	MC4	L 13–56	3,116
November 2	1:00 pm	Mercer	Richardson Stadium; Davidson, NC	MC4	L 26–51	4,027
November 9	3:00 pm	at Stetson	Spec Martin Stadium; DeLand, FL	MC4	L 13–26	6,544
November 23	1:00 pm	Campbell	Richardson Stadium; Davidson, NC	MC4	L 14–47	3,309
*Non-conference game; ^{†}Homecoming; All times are in Eastern time

- Source: Schedule
