= 2013 Jacksonville Dolphins football team =

American college football season

2013 Jacksonville Dolphins football
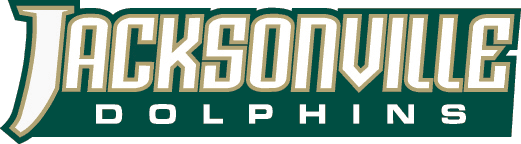
- Conference: Pioneer Football League
- Record: 5–6 (4–4 PFL)
- Head coach: Kerwin Bell (7th season)
- Defensive coordinator: Jerry Odom (4th season)
- Home stadium: D. B. Milne Field

2013 Pioneer Football League standings
	Conf.			Overall
Team	W		L	W		L
Marist +	7	–	1	8	–	3
Butler +^	7	–	1	9	–	4
Mercer	6	–	2	10	–	2
Dayton	5	–	3	7	–	4
Drake	5	–	3	6	–	5
Jacksonville	4	–	4	5	–	6
Morehead State	3	–	5	3	–	9
Campbell	2	–	6	3	–	9
Stetson	1	–	7	2	–	9
Valparaiso	1	–	7	1	–	10
Davidson	0	–	8	0	–	11
San Diego	0	–	0	8	–	3
+ – Conference co-champions; ^ – FCS playoff participant; San Diego declared itself ineligible for conference title because of improper scholarships for football players; it will have an official conference record of 0–0 and will not have a place in the conference standings.

The 2013 Jacksonville Dolphins football team represented Jacksonville University in the 2013 NCAA Division I FCS football season. They were led by seventh-year head coach Kerwin Bell and played their home games at D. B. Milne Field. They were a member of the Pioneer Football League. They finished the season 5–6, 4–4 in PFL play to finish in sixth place.

== Schedule ==
Date	Time	Opponent	Site	TV	Result	Attendance
August 29	7:30 pm	at Delaware*	Delaware Stadium; Newark, DE		L 35–51	19,120
September 7	6:00 pm	at Jacksonville State*	JSU Stadium; Jacksonville, AL	WJXS	L 13–48	17,592
September 14	1:00 pm	Morehead State	D. B. Milne Field; Jacksonville, FL	WCWJ	W 69–19	3,813
September 21	1:00 pm	Warner*	D. B. Milne Field; Jacksonville, FL	WCWJ	W 69–16	2,207
September 28	12:00 pm	Butler	D. B. Milne Field; Jacksonville, FL	WCWJ	L 27–45	1,172
October 5	2:00 pm	at Drake	Drake Stadium; Des Moines, IA		L 17–27	3,121
October 19	1:00 pm	at Campbell	Barker–Lane Stadium; Buies Creek, NC		W 52–45	2,750
October 26	1:00 pm	Davidson^{†}	D. B. Milne Field; Jacksonville, FL	WCWJ	W 56–13	3,116
November 2	1:00 pm	at Marist	Tenney Stadium at Leonidoff Field; Poughkeepsie, NY		L 35–42	1,667
November 9	3:00 pm	at Mercer	Moye Complex; Macon, GA		L 42–45	9,729
November 16	1:00 pm	Stetson	D. B. Milne Field; Jacksonville, FL	WCWJ	W 45–24	2,983
*Non-conference game; ^{†}Homecoming; All times are in Eastern time

- Source: Schedule
