= 2013 San Diego Toreros football team =

American college football season

2013 San Diego Toreros football
- Conference: Pioneer Football League
- Record: 8–3 (0–0 PFL)
- Head coach: Dale Lindsey (1st season)
- Offensive coordinator: Tanner Engstrand (3rd season)
- Defensive coordinator: Steve Irvin (1st season)
- Home stadium: Torero Stadium

2013 Pioneer Football League standings
	Conf.			Overall
Team	W		L	W		L
Marist +	7	–	1	8	–	3
Butler +^	7	–	1	9	–	4
Mercer	6	–	2	10	–	2
Dayton	5	–	3	7	–	4
Drake	5	–	3	6	–	5
Jacksonville	4	–	4	5	–	6
Morehead State	3	–	5	3	–	9
Campbell	2	–	6	3	–	9
Stetson	1	–	7	2	–	9
Valparaiso	1	–	7	1	–	10
Davidson	0	–	8	0	–	11
San Diego	0	–	0	8	–	3
+ – Conference co-champions; ^ – FCS playoff participant; San Diego declared itself ineligible for conference title because of improper scholarships for football players; it will have an official conference record of 0–0 and will not have a place in the conference standings.

The 2013 San Diego Toreros football team represented the University of San Diego as a member of the Pioneer Football League (PFL) during the 2013 NCAA Division I FCS football season. Led by first-year head coach Dale Lindsey, the Toreros compiled an overall record of 8–3 with a mark of 7–1 in conference play, which would have been good enough for a tie for the PFL title. However, San Diego declared itself ineligible for the league title after improper scholarships were offered to football players. The team's official conference record for the season is recognized as 0–0. The Toreros played home games at Torero Stadium in San Diego.

== Schedule ==
Date	Time	Opponent	Site	Result	Attendance
August 31	4:00 pm	at No. 14 Cal Poly*	Alex G. Spanos Stadium; San Luis Obispo, CA	L 16–38	5,840
September 7	6:00 pm	Western New Mexico*	Torero Stadium; San Diego, CA	W 38–35	4,186
September 21	12:00 pm	Harvard*	Torero Stadium; San Diego, CA	L 20–42	4,256
September 28	10:00 am	at Stetson	Spec Martin Stadium; DeLand, FL	W 59–0	5,874
October 5	1:00 pm	Mercer	Torero Stadium; San Diego, CA	W 45–13	1,515
October 12	2:00 pm	Marist^{†}	Torero Stadium; San Diego, CA	W 35–33	3,513
October 19	3:00 pm	at Dayton	Welcome Stadium; Dayon, OH	L 38–45	3,235
October 26	1:00 pm	Butler	Torero Stadium; San Diego, CA	W 42–14	1,533
November 2	11:00 am	at Valparaiso	Brown Field; Valparaiso, IN	W 58–14	1,704
November 9	10:00 am	at Morehead State	Jayne Stadium; Morehead, KY	W 56–3	1,137
November 16	12:00 pm	Drake	Torero Stadium; San Diego, CA	W 23–13	4,136
*Non-conference game; ^{†}Homecoming; Rankings from The Sports Network Poll released prior to the game; All times are in Pacific time
