= 2013 Dayton Flyers football team =

American college football season

2013 Dayton Flyers football
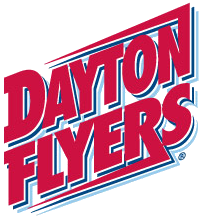
- Conference: Pioneer Football League
- Record: 7–4 (5–3 PFL)
- Head coach: Rick Chamberlin (6th season)
- Offensive coordinator: Chris Ochs (2nd season)
- Defensive coordinator: Landon Fox (4th season)
- MVP: Will Bardo
- Home stadium: Welcome Stadium

2013 Pioneer Football League standings
	Conf.			Overall
Team	W		L	W		L
Marist +	7	–	1	8	–	3
Butler +^	7	–	1	9	–	4
Mercer	6	–	2	10	–	2
Dayton	5	–	3	7	–	4
Drake	5	–	3	6	–	5
Jacksonville	4	–	4	5	–	6
Morehead State	3	–	5	3	–	9
Campbell	2	–	6	3	–	9
Stetson	1	–	7	2	–	9
Valparaiso	1	–	7	1	–	10
Davidson	0	–	8	0	–	11
San Diego	0	–	0	8	–	3
+ – Conference co-champions; ^ – FCS playoff participant; San Diego declared itself ineligible for conference title because of improper scholarships for football players; it will have an official conference record of 0–0 and will not have a place in the conference standings.

The 2013 Dayton Flyers football team represented the University of Dayton as a member of the Pioneer Football League (PFL) during the 2013 NCAA Division I FCS football season. Led by sixth-year head coach Rick Chamberlin, the Flyers compiled an overall record of 7–4 with a mark of 5–3 in conference play, tying for fourth place in the PFL. Dayton played home games at Welcome Stadium in Dayton, Ohio. Will Bardo was awarded White-Allen Most Valuable Player Trophy.

== Schedule ==
Date	Time	Opponent	Site	TV	Result	Attendance
August 29	7:30 pm	at Youngstown State*	Stambaugh Stadium; Youngstown, OH	My YTV	L 10–28	12,018
September 7	1:00 pm	Duquesne*	Welcome Stadium; Dayton, OH		W 23–20	3,478
September 14	12:00 pm	at Robert Morris*	Joe Walton Stadium; Moon Township, PA	NECFR	W 21–14	1,625
September 28	1:00 pm	Marist	Welcome Stadium; Dayton, OH		L 20–31	5,146
October 5	1:00 pm	Davidson	Welcome Stadium; Dayton, OH		W 40–8	2,376
October 12	1:00 pm	at Stetson	Spec Martin Stadium; DeLand, FL		W 49–20	5,116
October 19	12:00 pm	San Diego	Welcome Stadium; Dayton, OH		W 45–38 ^{2OT}	3,235
October 26	1:00 pm	at Morehead State	Jayne Stadium; Morehead, KY		W 42–14	7,547
November 2	1:00 pm	Butler	Welcome Stadium; Dayton, OH		L 30–33	2,872
November 9	2:00 pm	at Drake	Drake Stadium; Des Moines, IA (rivalry)		L 10–36	2,456
November 16	2:00 pm	at Valparaiso	Brown Field; Valparaiso, IN		W 45–20	1,668
*Non-conference game; All times are in Eastern time
