= John Russell (aviator) =

John Bernard Russell
- Born: 5 June 1894; Pictou, Nova Scotia, Canada
- Died: 1960 (aged 65–66)
- Military career
- Allegiance: George V of the British Empire
- Branch: Engineers; aviation
- Rank: Second lieutenant
- Unit: No. 103 Squadron RAF
- Awards: Distinguished Flying Cross

Second Lieutenant John Bernard Russell was a World War I flying ace credited with five aerial victories.

== Early life and enlistment ==
Russell was born on 5 June 1894 in Pictou, Nova Scotia; his mother was Mrs J. S. Russell. When he joined the Canadian Expeditionary Force on 17 May 1915, he was working as a banker. As his mother was then living in Ottawa, and Russell enlisted there, it seems probable Russell was residing with his mother, especially as he was unmarried. He claimed no prior military experience. As was customary for Canadian enlistees, he swore allegiance to King George V.

== First World War aerial service ==
Russell became the aircrew on Airco DH.9 bombers of No. 103 Squadron RAF. His first aerial success came at 2030 hours on 4 July 1918, when he was manning the guns in DH.9 number C6150, piloted by Roy Dodds. Russell drove a Pfalz D.III down out of control over La Bassée.

On 31 July, while flying with John Stevenson Stubbs as his pilot, Russell was credited with two more victories, as Stubbs drove one enemy aircraft down out of control while Russell similarly accounted for another. Their Distinguished Flying Cross citation noted that the odds against them were ten to two. The DFC was also awarded because they returned to the attack in a single plane low level bombing attack at 1,500 feet and bombed a train and lorries while surviving heavy ground fire.

Russell was again paired with Stubbs on 25 August 1918. At 1115 hours, while mounted on DH.9 number D3274, they drove down out of control a Fokker D.VII fighter south of Armentières, France, and destroyed another one southeast of the city.

The Distinguished Flying Cross for Russell and Stubbs was gazetted on 2 November 1918.

== Post War career ==
Little is known of Russell's postwar career. However, it is known that he was transferred to the Royal Air Force's unemployed list on 24 February 1919. It is also known that he died in 1960.

== List of aerial victories ==
See also Aerial victory standards of World War I

Confirmed victories are numbered and listed chronologically. Unconfirmed victories are denoted by "u/c" and may or may not be listed by date.

| No. | Date/time | Aircraft | Foe | Result | Location | Notes |
|---|---|---|---|---|---|---|
| 1 | 4 July 1918 @ 20:30 hours | Airco DH.9 serial number C6150 | Pfalz D.III | Driven down out of control | La Bassée | Pilot: Roy Dodds |
| 2 | 31 July 1918 | Airco DH.9 | Enemy aircraft | Driven down out of control | | Pilot: John Stubbs |
| 3 | 31 July 1918 | Airco DH.9 | Enemy aircraft | Driven down out of control | | Pilot: John Stubbs |
| 4 | 25 August 1918 @ 11:15 hours | Airco DH.9 | Fokker D.VII | Driven down out of control | South of Armentières | Pilot: John Stubbs |
| 5 | 25 August 1918 @ 11:15 hours | Airco DH.9 | Fokker D.VII | Destroyed | Southeast of Armentières | Pilot: John Stubbs |
