= John Russell (priest, born 1868) =

John Delacourt Russell (b Hendon 1868 – d Riverton 9 February 1949) was the Archdeacon of Oamaru from 1915 until 1928 when it was renamed the Archdeaconry of North Otago, serving a further 16 years until his retirement in 1944: a total of 29 years. until his death on 9 February 1949.

Russell was ordained in 1893. He was Curate of St. Stephen the Martyr, Ōpōtiki. Later he held incumbencies at Bulls, Petone and Oamaru.
