= 2013 Butler Bulldogs football team =

American college football season

2013 Butler Bulldogs football
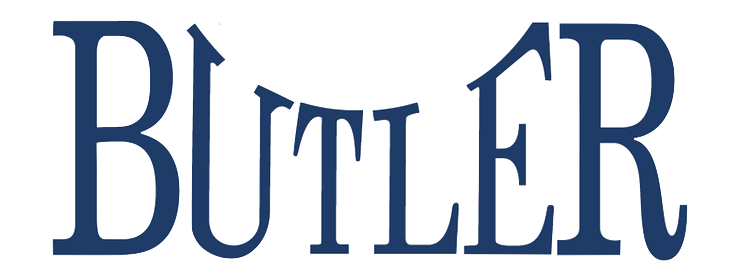

PFL co-champion

NCAA Division I First Round, L 0–31 vs. Tennessee State
- Conference: Pioneer Football League
- Record: 9–4 (7–1 PFL)
- Head coach: Jeff Voris (8th season)
- Co-defensive coordinators: Joe Cheshire (4th season); Tim Cooper (4th season)
- Home stadium: Butler Bowl

2013 Pioneer Football League standings
	Conf.			Overall
Team	W		L	W		L
Marist +	7	–	1	8	–	3
Butler +^	7	–	1	9	–	4
Mercer	6	–	2	10	–	2
Dayton	5	–	3	7	–	4
Drake	5	–	3	6	–	5
Jacksonville	4	–	4	5	–	6
Morehead State	3	–	5	3	–	9
Campbell	2	–	6	3	–	9
Stetson	1	–	7	2	–	9
Valparaiso	1	–	7	1	–	10
Davidson	0	–	8	0	–	11
San Diego	0	–	0	8	–	3
+ – Conference co-champions; ^ – FCS playoff participant; San Diego declared itself ineligible for conference title because of improper scholarships for football players; it will have an official conference record of 0–0 and will not have a place in the conference standings.

The 2013 Butler Bulldogs football team represented Butler University as a member of the a member of the Pioneer Football League (PFL) the 2013 NCAA Division I FCS football season. Led by eighth-year head coach Jeff Voris, the Bulldogs compiled an overall record of 9–4 with a mark of 7–1 in conference play, sharing the PFL title with Marist. PFL teams were eligible to compete in the NCAA Division I Football Championship playoff for the first time in 2013. Butler and Marist did not play each other in the regular season, so the PFL used the College Sporting News' Gridiron Power Index to determine the league's automatic bid to the playoffs. Butler was selected and lost in the first round to Tennessee State. The Bulldogs played home games at the Butler Bowl in Indianapolis.

== Schedule ==
Date	Time	Opponent	Site	TV	Result	Attendance
August 31	7:00 pm	at No. 6 South Dakota State*	Coughlin–Alumni Stadium; Brookings, SD		L 14–55	9,729
September 7	6:00 pm	Wittenberg*	Butler Bowl; Indianapolis, IN		W 49–24	3,541
September 14	6:00 pm	at Franklin (IN)*	Faught Stadium; Franklin, IN		W 31–28	4,200
September 21	6:00 pm	Dartmouth*	Butler Bowl; Indianapolis, IN		L 23–30	3,194
September 28	12:00 pm	at Jacksonville	D. B. Milne Field; Jacksonville, FL		W 45–27	1,172
October 5	1:00 pm	Stetson	Butler Bowl; Indianapolis, IN		W 35–15	1,494
October 12	1:00 pm	Campbell^{†}	Butler Bowl; Indianapolis, IN		W 35–14	3,400
October 19	1:00 pm	Drake	Butler Bowl; Indianapolis, IN		W 24–14	1,576
October 26	4:00 pm	at San Diego	Torero Stadium; San Diego, CA		L 14–42	1,533
November 2	1:00 pm	at Dayton	Welcome Stadium; Dayton, OH		W 33–30	2,872
November 9	1:00 pm	Valparaiso	Butler Bowl; Indianapolis, IN (Hoosier Helmet Trophy)		W 72–12	3,049
November 16	1:00 pm	at Morehead State	Jayne Stadium; Morehead, KY		W 58–27	1,583
November 30	1:00 pm	No. 19 Tennessee State*	Butler Bowl; Indianapolis, IN (NCAA Division I First Round)	ESPN3	L 0–31	1,928
*Non-conference game; ^{†}Homecoming; Rankings from The Sports Network Poll released prior to the game; All times are in Eastern time
