= John Russell (English cricketer) =

English cricketer

John Bernard Russell (2 October 1883 – 17 August 1965) was an English cricketer who played a single first-class cricket match for Warwickshire in 1920, but was a regular Minor Counties player for Staffordshire for 20 years. He was born in Rushall, Staffordshire and died in Lichfield, also in Staffordshire.

Russell was a right-handed lower-order batsman and wicketkeeper. He played in some Minor Counties matches for Staffordshire before the First World War, but did not resume his career with them immediately after war ended. His single first-class match was the Warwickshire game against Cambridge University in which both teams rested prominent players; Warwickshire's regular wicketkeeper, Tiger Smith, played in the game but Russell kept wicket, taking one catch and making one stumping. He did not play in senior cricket again, but was regularly both captain and wicketkeeper in the Staffordshire side of the 1920s, which also included the now-aged but still effective Sydney Barnes. He retired after the 1927 season in which he led the team to the Minor Counties Cricket Championship.
