= 2013 Valparaiso Crusaders football team =

American college football season

2013 Valparaiso Crusaders football
- Conference: Pioneer Football League
- Record: 1–10 (1–7 PFL)
- Head coach: Dale Carlson (4th season season; first nine games); Mike Gravier (interim) (final game)
- Offensive coordinator: Bob Muckian
- Defensive coordinator: Tyson Silveus
- Home stadium: Brown Field

2013 Pioneer Football League standings
| | Conf. | | | Overall |
| Team | W | | L | W | | L |
|---|---|---|---|---|---|---|
| Marist + | 7 | – | 1 | 8 | – | 3 |
| Butler +^ | 7 | – | 1 | 9 | – | 4 |
| Mercer | 6 | – | 2 | 10 | – | 2 |
| Dayton | 5 | – | 3 | 7 | – | 4 |
| Drake | 5 | – | 3 | 6 | – | 5 |
| Jacksonville | 4 | – | 4 | 5 | – | 6 |
| Morehead State | 3 | – | 5 | 3 | – | 9 |
| Campbell | 2 | – | 6 | 3 | – | 9 |
| Stetson | 1 | – | 7 | 2 | – | 9 |
| Valparaiso | 1 | – | 7 | 1 | – | 10 |
| Davidson | 0 | – | 8 | 0 | – | 11 |
| San Diego | 0 | – | 0 | 8 | – | 3 |
+ – Conference co-champions; ^ – FCS playoff participant; San Diego declared itself ineligible for conference title because of improper scholarships for football players; it will have an official conference record of 0–0 and will not have a place in the conference standings.

The 2013 Valparaiso Crusaders football team represented Valparaiso University in the 2013 NCAA Division I FCS football season. They were led by fourth-year head coach Dale Carlson and played their home games at Brown Field. They were a member of the Pioneer Football League. They finished the season 1–10, 1–7 in PFL play to finish in a tie for ninth place.

Assistant coach Mike Gravier was promoted to interim head coach for the final game of the season when head coach Carlson was fired. At the end of the season, Dave Cecchini was hired as a full-time replacement.

== Schedule ==
| Date | Time | Opponent | Site | Result | Attendance |
|---|---|---|---|---|---|
| August 29 | 8:00 pm | at North Dakota* | Alerus Center; Grand Forks, ND | L 10–69 | 9,269 |
| September 7 | 1:00 pm | at Saint Joseph's (IN)* | Alumni Stadium; Rensselaer, IN | L 31–34 | 2,865 |
| September 14 | 2:00 pm | William Jewell* | Brown Field; Valparaiso, IN | L 34–36 | 1,574 |
| September 28 | 2:00 pm | Campbell^{†} | Brown Field; Valparaiso, IN | W 49–42 ^{OT} | 3,357 |
| October 5 | 12:00 pm | at Marist | Tenney Stadium at Leonidoff Field; Poughkeepsie, NY | L 0–37 | 2,089 |
| October 12 | 12:00 pm | at Mercer | Moye Complex; Macon, GA | L 21–35 | 8,272 |
| October 19 | 2:00 pm | Morehead State | Brown Field; Valparaiso, IN | L 28–42 | 2,287 |
| October 26 | 2:00 pm | at Drake | Drake Stadium; Des Moines, IA | L 10–23 | 2,154 |
| November 2 | 1:00 pm | San Diego | Brown Field; Valparaiso, IN | L 14–58 | 1,704 |
| November 9 | 1:00 pm | at Butler | Butler Bowl; Indianapolis, IN (Hoosier Helmet Trophy) | L 12–72 | 3,049 |
| November 16 | 2:00 pm | Dayton | Brown Field; Valparaiso, IN | L 20–45 | 1,668 |
*Non-conference game; ^{†}Homecoming; All times are in Eastern time
