= John Russell of Bluffdale =

American novelist

John Russell of Bluffdale (1793–1863) was a 19th-century American novelist, writer and licensed Baptist preacher. He wrote the first published novel featuring Mormons. Russell was born in Vermont, but lived most of his life in Bluffdale, Illinois.

In the early 1830s Russell was exposed to the teachings of Mormonism by Parley P. Pratt and William E. McLellin.

Among Russell's works were The Venomous Worm, a pro-temperance story published in McGuffey Readers. He also had published in 1853 The Mormoness, the first published novel featuring a Mormon. It represented a more balanced portrayal of Mormons than most 19th-century mentions, lamenting attacks on their religious freedom while still largely disparaging their beliefs and practices.

== Sources ==
- Terryl L. Givens and Matthew J. Grow, Parley P. Pratt: The Apostle Paul of Mormonism (New York: Oxford University Press, 2011), p. 57-58.
- John T. Flanagan, "John Russell of Bluffdale", Journal ofo the Illinois State Historical Society, Vol. 2, no. 3, Sep. 1949.
