= John Russell (Queen's Park footballer) =

Scottish footballer

Personal information
- Place of birth: Glasgow, Scotland
- Positions: Inside forward; wing half

Senior career*
Years	Team	Apps	(Gls)
1924–1933	Queen's Park	113	(19)
- * Club domestic league appearances and goals

John M. Russell was a Scottish amateur football inside forward and wing half who made over 110 appearances in the Scottish League for Queen's Park.
