= 2013 Campbell Fighting Camels football team =

American college football season

2013 Campbell Fighting Camels football
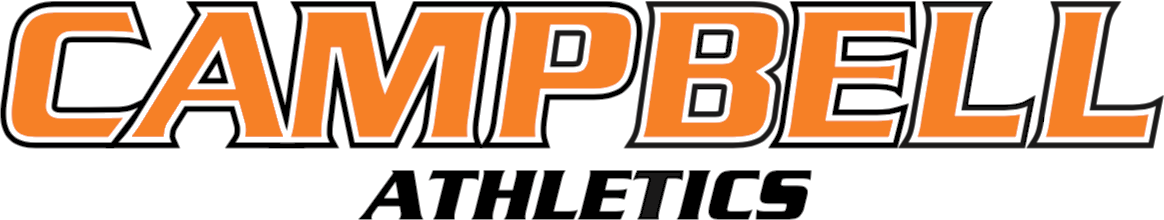
- Conference: Pioneer Football League
- Record: 3–9 (2–6 PFL)
- Head coach: Mike Minter (1st season)
- Offensive coordinator: Landon Mariani (1st season)
- Defensive coordinator: Craig Cox (1st season)
- Home stadium: Barker–Lane Stadium

2013 Pioneer Football League standings
	Conf.			Overall
Team	W		L	W		L
Marist +	7	–	1	8	–	3
Butler +^	7	–	1	9	–	4
Mercer	6	–	2	10	–	2
Dayton	5	–	3	7	–	4
Drake	5	–	3	6	–	5
Jacksonville	4	–	4	5	–	6
Morehead State	3	–	5	3	–	9
Campbell	2	–	6	3	–	9
Stetson	1	–	7	2	–	9
Valparaiso	1	–	7	1	–	10
Davidson	0	–	8	0	–	11
San Diego	0	–	0	8	–	3
+ – Conference co-champions; ^ – FCS playoff participant; San Diego declared itself ineligible for conference title because of improper scholarships for football players; it will have an official conference record of 0–0 and will not have a place in the conference standings.

The 2013 Campbell Fighting Camels football team represented Campbell University in the 2013 NCAA Division I FCS football season. They were led by first-year head coach Mike Minter and played their home games at Barker–Lane Stadium. They were a member of the Pioneer Football League. They finished the season 3–9, 2–6 in PFL play to finish in eighth place.

== Schedule ==
Date	Time	Opponent	Site	TV	Result	Attendance
August 31	12:00 pm	at Charlotte*	Jerry Richardson Stadium; Charlotte, NC	WCCB	L 7–52	16,630
September 7	6:00 pm	Virginia–Wise*	Barker–Lane Stadium; Buies Creek, NC		W 56–21	5,538
September 14	6:00 pm	Charleston Southern*	Barker–Lane Stadium; Buies Creek, NC		L 10–30	6,044
September 28	2:00 pm	at Valparaiso	Brown Field; Valparaiso, IN		L 42–49 ^{OT}	3,357
October 5	1:00 pm	Morehead State	Barker–Lane Stadium; Buies Creek, NC		L 36–45	4,270
October 12	1:00 pm	at Butler	Butler Bowl; Indianapolis, IN		L 14–35	3,400
October 19	1:00 pm	Jacksonville	Barker–Lane Stadium; Buies Creek, NC		L 45–52	2,750
October 26	4:00 pm	Mercer^{†}	Barker–Lane Stadium; Buies Creek, NC		L 31–38	4,772
November 2	1:00 pm	at Stetson	Spec Martin Stadium; DeLand, FL		W 19–18	3,008
November 9	1:00 pm	Marist	Barker–Lane Stadium; Buies Creek, NC		L 28–55	2,820
November 16	1:00 pm	at Old Dominion*	Foreman Field; Norfolk, VA		L 14–42	20,118
November 23	1:00 pm	at Davidson	Richardson Stadium; Davidson, NC		W 47–14	3,309
*Non-conference game; ^{†}Homecoming; All times are in Eastern time
