= George Robert Russell =

American merchant (1800–1866)

- Born: May 5, 1800
- Died: August 5, 1866 (aged 66)
- Citizenship: United States
- Education: Brown University
- Occupations: Lawyer, Merchant, Lecturer, and Abolitionist
- Father: Johnathan Russell

George Robert Russell (May 5, 1800 – August 5, 1866) was a prominent New England merchant who co-founded and co-owned one of the leading U.S. trading houses in the Philippines, the Sturgis and Russell Company, during the nineteenth century. In addition to his business endeavors, Russell became a lecturer and writer on economics. Later in his life, he emerged as an abolitionist. A graduate of Brown University, his father was the diplomat and politician Jonathan Russell.

== Early life ==
Russell had many sisters in his family, one named Amelia who he frequently wrote to when he left the United States. Many of his family members were well-known business merchants. Russell's father Jonathan Russell was a prominent merchant, diplomat, and Democratic party politician. He was also the nephew of Phillip Ammidon who owned Russell & Co. Russell was a prodigy within his family. He also spoke three languages.

== Russell and Sturgis Company ==
George Russell graduated from Brown University in 1821. Russell wrote to his uncle that he wanted to practice law in New England. Afterward, Russell wrote to his sisters that he needed to leave the United States to start making a fortune. Russell describes it as a "necessary but temporary evil." At the end of 1825, he stopped by Lima to meet Simón Bolívar. Moreover, Russell held a note from General Lafayette. He also witnessed the siege of Callao within the front lives of Peruvian forces. After witnessing the revolution in Peru, Russell knew he could not establish his business in the region. Russell would join his uncle, Philip Ammidon who co-partnered "Russell & Co.", founded by Samuel Russell in Canton. Russell sailed on a ship from Lima to Manila where he saw a vast array of opportunities in the Island of Luconia. Russell was convinced that his decision to leave South America was not a mistake. While Russell planned to leave his uncle's company, he met Samuel Russell who was very impressed by him. However, Samuel Russell was not the only one who was impressed by George Russell's growing profile. John Perkins Cushing, of Perkins & Co., a major shipping company pursued George Russell and eventually accepted a job offer to spearhead many of the instructions.

In 1827, Russell became one of the co-founders of the Russell and Sturgis firm. Russell along with Henry Parkman Sturgis (1806-1869) led the firm among many other firms in the Pacific region. It was based in Manila, Philippines. Russell and Sturgis Company was a shipping company that actively participated in the Canton Trade and held deals with Boston merchants. In 1828, they officially opened for business. Products like hemp and sugar were shipped under the Russell and Sturgis Company. It had native Filipinos as assistants but could not sleep in the house, They were permitted to enter during only business hours. In the early years of this company, it had an interest in exports. It had many successes in its first years. Something that contributed to this success is the crocodile story. There is a story that Russell killed a crocodile near Jala-Jala, Philippines. This story was admired by foreign travelers. Moreover, this was used to attract merchants because Russell was a fearless traveler and merchant during the Galleon trade. Consequently, Russell's background in law also helped sprout success in the Russell and Sturgis Company. Companies close to the proximity of his business were declaring bankruptcy like the Barretto family of Barretto & Co. However, his expertise in law helped his business both thrive and survive in a time of economic uncertainty. Russell and Sturgis would be one of the few companies to not engage in narcotics trading at this time and region.

Russell left his company in 1850. While he left his company, he did not retire from capitalist ventures as railroads became his next investments. His half-brother Jonathan Russell and colleague Edward Green would be the next successors and co-partners. Russell and Sturgis would eventually file for bankruptcy. Russell and Co would eventually absorb the firm.

== Character and mannerisms ==
George Russell was described as a man of high honor and integrity. Many people who encountered him expressed their admiration for his character. Folks like Admiral LaPlace who was in Manilla spoke highly of Russell. LaPlace noted, "an American merchant distinguished in every respect." A person of no known record described him as a "very competent person." The letters he writes to his sisters portray this admiration. Russell knew how to be reserved as he never wanted to be a powerful elitist. He just wanted his business to thrive to be comfortable and not be in financial trouble like in the earlier years of his life. Russell noted, "I never expected to be able to nabobize but hope at some future day to live comfortably in my own country." Russell never sought to be the richest or most powerful. However, he knew that commercial businesses were vital to living a comfortable life. Having sources of income will lead to a stable life, especially in uncertain times. Russell would eventually marry and have a child in Milton, Massachusetts. Russell died in 1866.
