= 2013 Morehead State Eagles football team =

American college football season

2013 Morehead State Eagles football
- Conference: Pioneer Football League
- Record: 3–9 (3–5 PFL)
- Head coach: Rob Tenyer (1st season)
- Offensive coordinator: Craig Mullins
- Defensive coordinator: Phil Burnett
- Home stadium: Jayne Stadium

2013 Pioneer Football League standings
	Conf.			Overall
Team	W		L	W		L
Marist +	7	–	1	8	–	3
Butler +^	7	–	1	9	–	4
Mercer	6	–	2	10	–	2
Dayton	5	–	3	7	–	4
Drake	5	–	3	6	–	5
Jacksonville	4	–	4	5	–	6
Morehead State	3	–	5	3	–	9
Campbell	2	–	6	3	–	9
Stetson	1	–	7	2	–	9
Valparaiso	1	–	7	1	–	10
Davidson	0	–	8	0	–	11
San Diego	0	–	0	8	–	3
+ – Conference co-champions; ^ – FCS playoff participant; San Diego declared itself ineligible for conference title because of improper scholarships for football players; it will have an official conference record of 0–0 and will not have a place in the conference standings.

The 2013 Morehead State Eagles football team represented Morehead State University in the 2013 NCAA Division I FCS football season. They were led by first-year head coach Rob Tenyer and played their home games at Jayne Stadium. The team was a member of the Pioneer Football League and finished the season 3–9, 3–5 in PFL play to finish in seventh place.

== Schedule ==
Date	Time	Opponent	Site	Result	Attendance
August 29	7:00 pm	Pikeville*	Jayne Stadium; Morehead, KY	L 10–13	8,311
September 7	4:00 pm	at No. 25 Youngstown State*	Stambaugh Stadium; Youngstown, OH	L 13–67	13,226
September 14	1:00 pm	at Jacksonville	D. B. Milne Field; Jacksonville, FL	L 19–69	3,813
September 21	7:00 pm	Eastern Kentucky*	Jayne Stadium; Morehead, KY (Old Hawg Rifle)	L 24–56	8,115
September 28	1:00 pm	Davidson	Jayne Stadium; Morehead, KY	W 45–14	2,341
October 5	1:00 pm	at Campbell	Barker–Lane Stadium; Buies Creek, NC	W 45–36	4,270
October 19	2:00 pm	at Valparaiso	Brown Field; Valparaiso, IN	W 42–28	2,287
October 26	1:00 pm	Dayton^{†}	Jayne Stadium; Morehead, KY	L 14–42	7,547
November 2	2:00 pm	at Drake	Drake Stadium; Des Moines, IA	L 14–56	2,064
November 9	1:00 pm	San Diego	Jayne Stadium; Morehead, KY	L 3–56	1,137
November 16	1:00 pm	Butler	Jayne Stadium; Morehead, KY	L 27–58	1,583
November 23	1:00 pm	Charlotte*	Jayne Stadium; Morehead, KY	L 17–61	1,443
*Non-conference game; ^{†}Homecoming; Rankings from Coaches' Poll released prior to the game; All times are in Eastern time
