= Jack Russell (Wexford hurler) =

Irish hurler

Personal information
- Native name: Seán Ruiséil (Irish)
- Born: 1950 (age 75–76) New Ross, County Wexford, Ireland

Sport
- Sport: Hurling
- Position: Full-back
Club
- Years: Club
- Geraldine O'Hanrahans
Club titles
- Wexford titles: 0
Inter-county*
Years	County	Apps (scores)
1970-1983	Wexford	7 (0-00)
Inter-county titles
- Leinster titles: 0
- All-Irelands: 0
- NHL: 0
- All Stars: 0
- *Inter County team apps and scores correct as of 17:18, 8 July 2014.

Jack Russell (born 1950) is an Irish retired hurler who played as a full-back for the Wexford senior team.

Born in New Ross, County Wexford, Russell first arrived on the inter-county scene at the age of seventeen when he first linked up with the Wexford minor team, before later joining the under-21 side. He joined the senior panel during the 1970 championship. Russell went on to play a bit part for the team for over a decade, and won two Leinster medals as a non-playing substitute. He was an All-Ireland runner-up on two occasions.

At club level Russell enjoyed a lengthy career with Geraldine O'Hanrahan's.

Throughout his inter-county career Russell made 7 championship appearances for Wexford. His retirement came following the conclusion of the 1983 championship.

== Honours ==
=== Team ===
Wexford

- Leinster Senior Hurling Championship (2): 1976 (sub), 1977 (sub)
- Leinster Under-21 Hurling Championship (3): 1969, 1970, 1971
- All-Ireland Minor Hurling Championship (1): 1968
- Leinster Minor Hurling Championship (1): 1968
