= John Russell (footballer, born 1872) =

Scottish footballer

Personal information
- Full name: John Russell
- Date of birth: 29 December 1872
- Place of birth: Carstairs, Scotland
- Date of death: 10 August 1905 (aged 32)
- Place of death: Glasgow, Scotland
- Height: 5 ft 5 in (1.65 m)
- Position: Outside left

Senior career*
Years	Team	Apps	(Gls)
18??–1892	Wishaw Thistle		
1892–1895	Leith Athletic		
1895–1896	St Mirren	7	(2)
1896–1897	Woolwich Arsenal	23	(4)
1897–1900	Bristol City		
1900–1901	Blackburn Rovers	1	(0)
1901–1902	Brighton & Hove Albion	13	(2)
1902–1903	Port Glasgow Athletic		
1903–1904	Motherwell	12	(3)
1904–1905	Doncaster Rovers	3	(0)
- * Club domestic league appearances and goals

John Russell (29 December 1872 – 10 August 1905) was a Scottish professional footballer who played as an outside left in the Scottish League for Leith Athletic, St Mirren, Port Glasgow Athletic and Motherwell, in the English Football League for Woolwich Arsenal, Blackburn Rovers and Doncaster Rovers, and in the English Southern League for Bristol City and Brighton & Hove Albion.
