= 2013 Mercer Bears football team =

American college football season

2013 Mercer Bears football
- Conference: Pioneer Football League
- Record: 10–2 (6–2 PFL)
- Head coach: Bobby Lamb (1st season)
- Offensive coordinator: Casey Vogt (1st season)
- Defensive coordinator: Mike Kolakowski (1st season)
- Home stadium: Moye Complex

2013 Pioneer Football League standings
	Conf.			Overall
Team	W		L	W		L
Marist +	7	–	1	8	–	3
Butler +^	7	–	1	9	–	4
Mercer	6	–	2	10	–	2
Dayton	5	–	3	7	–	4
Drake	5	–	3	6	–	5
Jacksonville	4	–	4	5	–	6
Morehead State	3	–	5	3	–	9
Campbell	2	–	6	3	–	9
Stetson	1	–	7	2	–	9
Valparaiso	1	–	7	1	–	10
Davidson	0	–	8	0	–	11
San Diego	0	–	0	8	–	3
+ – Conference co-champions; ^ – FCS playoff participant; San Diego declared itself ineligible for conference title because of improper scholarships for football players; it will have an official conference record of 0–0 and will not have a place in the conference standings.

The 2013 Mercer Bears football team represented Mercer University in the 2013 NCAA Division I FCS football season. They were led by first-year head coach Bobby Lamb and played their home games at the Moye Complex. They were a member of the Pioneer Football League (PFL). This was Mercer's first year sponsoring football since 1941. This was also their only season as a member of the PFL as they joined the Southern Conference in 2014. They finished the season 10–2 overall and 6–2 in conference play, placing third in the PFL.

== Schedule ==
Date	Time	Opponent	Site	Result	Attendance
August 31	6:00 pm	Reinhardt*	Moye Complex; Macon, GA	W 40–37	12,172
September 14	6:00 pm	Warner*	Moye Complex; Macon, GA	W 61–0	10,027
September 21	6:00 pm	Berry*	Moye Complex; Macon, GA	W 43–0	9,327
September 28	1:00 pm	Drake	Moye Complex; Macon, GA	W 31–17	8,150
October 5	4:00 pm	at San Diego	Torero Stadium; San Diego, CA	L 13–45	1,515
October 12	12:00 pm	Valparaiso	Moye Complex; Macon, GA	W 35–21	8,272
October 19	1:00 pm	Carnegie Mellon*	Moye Complex; Macon, GA	W 54–21	8,327
October 26	4:00 pm	at Campbell	Barker–Lane Stadium; Buies Creek, NC	W 38–31	4,772
November 2	1:00 pm	at Davidson	Richardson Stadium; Davidson, NC	W 51–26	4,027
November 9	3:00 pm	Jacksonville	Moye Complex; Macon, GA	W 45–42	9,729
November 16	1:00 pm	at Marist	Tenney Stadium at Leonidoff Field; Poughkeepsie, NY	L 7–33	2,613
November 23	4:00 pm	Stetson^{†}	Moye Complex; Macon, GA	W 41–14	12,027
*Non-conference game; ^{†}Homecoming; All times are in Eastern time

== Awards ==
- 2013 Pioneer Football League Freshman Offensive Player of the Year

John Russ

=== Finalists ===
Players

- Jerry Rice Award

John Russ

Coaches

- Eddie Robinson Award

Bobby Lamb

=== Honors ===
==== All-PFL ====
Mercer had two players featured in the All-PFL selections:

- First Team

Tosin Aguebor

- Second Team

Robert Brown

- Honorable Mentions

JaTarii Donald
Kirby Southard
Alex Avant
Tyler Zielenske
