= 2013 Pac-12 Conference football season =

American college football season

- League: NCAA Division I Football Bowl Subdivision
- Sport: American football
- Duration: August 29, 2013 through January 2014
- Teams: 12
- TV partner(s): ABC, FOX, Fox Sports 1, ESPN, ESPN2, ESPNU, and Pac-12 Networks

2014 NFL Draft
- Top draft pick: LB Anthony Barr, UCLA
- Picked by: Minnesota Vikings, 9th overall

Regular season
- North champions: Stanford Cardinal; Oregon Ducks
- North runners-up: Washington Huskies
- South champions: Arizona State
- South runners-up: UCLA Bruins; USC Trojans

Pac-12 Championship
- Champions: Stanford Cardinal
- Runners-up: Arizona State Sun Devils
- Finals MVP: Tyler Gaffney (RB)

Football seasons
- 2012 2014

2013 Pac-12 Conference football standings
	Conf.			Overall
Team	W		L	W		L
North Division
No. 11 Stanford xy$	7	–	2	11	–	3
No. 9 Oregon x	7	–	2	11	–	2
No. 25 Washington	5	–	4	9	–	4
Oregon State	4	–	5	7	–	6
Washington State	4	–	5	6	–	7
California	0	–	9	1	–	11
South Division
No. 21 Arizona State xy	8	–	1	10	–	4
No. 16 UCLA	6	–	3	10	–	3
No. 19 USC	6	–	3	10	–	4
Arizona	4	–	5	8	–	5
Utah	2	–	7	5	–	7
Colorado	1	–	8	4	–	8
Championship: Stanford 38, Arizona State 14
$ – BCS representative as conference champion; x – Division champion/co-champions; y – Championship game participant; Rankings from AP Poll

The 2013 Pac-12 Conference football season began on August 29, 2013 with USC at Hawaii. The conference's first game was played on September 7, 2013 with Washington State winning over USC, and the final game was the Pac-12 Championship Game on December 7, 2013. This is the third season for the conference as a 12-team league. The Sagarin Ratings had the Pac-12 as the best conference in the nation top to bottom in the final rating of the season.

== Preseason ==
2013 Pac-12 Spring Football:

North Division

- California – Mon., Feb 25 to Sat., March 23
- Oregon – Tue., April 2 to Sat., April 27
- Oregon State – Mon., March 13 to Fri., April 26
- Stanford – Mon., Feb. 25 to Sat., April 13
- Washington – Tue., April 2 to Sat., April 20
- Washington State – Thu., March 21 to Sat., April 20

South Division

- Arizona – Mon., March 4 to Sat., April 13
- Arizona State – Tue., March 19 to Thu., April 18
- Colorado – Thu., March 7 to Tue., April 16
- UCLA – Tue., April 2 to Sat., April 27
- USC – Tue., March 5 to Sat., April 13
- Utah – Tue., March 19 to Sat., April 20

- July 26, 2013 – 2013 Media Day was held at Sony Pictures Studios, Culver City, California
- August 1, 2013 – Washington State started the Pac-12 pre-season practices

== Head coaches ==
- Rich Rodriguez, Arizona – 2nd year
- Todd Graham, Arizona State – 2nd year
- Sonny Dykes, California – 1st year
- Mike MacIntyre, Colorado – 1st year
- Mark Helfrich, Oregon – 1st year
- Mike Riley, Oregon State – 12th year
- David Shaw, Stanford – 3rd year
- Jim L. Mora, UCLA – 2nd year
- Lane Kiffin, USC – 4th year, Ed Orgeron – Interim
- Kyle Whittingham, Utah – 9th year
- Steve Sarkisian, Washington – 5th year
- Mike Leach, Washington State – 2nd year

== Rankings ==
Legend
	Increase in ranking
	Decrease in ranking
	Not ranked previous week
RV	Received votes but were not ranked in Top 25 of poll

		Pre	Wk 2	Wk 3	Wk 4	Wk 5	Wk 6	Wk 7	Wk 8	Wk 9	Wk 10	Wk 11	Wk 12	Wk 13	Wk 14	Wk 15	Wk 16	Final
Arizona	AP	RV	RV	RV	RV	RV					RV		RV					RV
Arizona	C	RV	RV	RV	RV	RV	RV	RV	RV				RV		RV			RV
Arizona	Harris	Not released									RV	RV						
Arizona	BCS	Not released																
Arizona State	AP	RV	RV	RV	23	RV	22	RV	RV	RV	25	23	21	19	13	11	16	21
Arizona State	C	RV	RV	RV	23	RV	24	RV	RV	RV	RV	24	22	22	18	13	16	20
Arizona State	Harris	Not released							RV	RV	25	24	22	22	16	12	17	
Arizona State	BCS	Not released										22	19	17	12	11	14	
California	AP																	
California	C																	
California	Harris	Not released																
California	BCS	Not released																
Colorado	AP																	
Colorado	C																	
Colorado	Harris	Not released																
Colorado	BCS	Not released																
Oregon	AP	3	2	2	2	2	2	2	2	2	2	2	6	5	12	12	10	9
Oregon	C	3	3	2	2	2	2	2	2	2	2	2	7	5	12	12	12	9
Oregon	Harris	Not released							2	2	2	2	6	5	12	12	12	
Oregon	BCS	Not released								3	2	3	6	5	13	12	10	
Oregon State	AP	25							RV	RV	RV							
Oregon State	C	25					RV	RV	RV	RV	RV	RV						
Oregon State	Harris	Not released							RV	RV	RV	RV	RV					
Oregon State	BCS	Not released								25								
Stanford	AP	4	5	5	5	5	5	5	13	8	6	6	5	10	8	7	5	11
Stanford	C	4	4	4	5	5	5	5	13	8	7	7	5	12	10	10	7	10
Stanford	Harris	Not released							12	8	6	6	5	11	8	7	5	
Stanford	BCS	Not released								6	5	5	4	9	8	7	5	
UCLA	AP	21	18	16	13	13	12	11	9	12	17	16	13	14	22	17	17	16
UCLA	C	21	18	17	15	14	13	13	10	11	19	18	15	14	22	19	18	16
UCLA	Harris	Not released							9	11	19	19	16	15	22	19	18	
UCLA	BCS	Not released								12	20	19	13	14	22	18	17	
USC	AP	24	25										RV	23	23	RV	RV	19
USC	C	24	22	RV	RV							RV	RV	25	23	RV	RV	19
USC	Harris	Not released										RV	RV	23	23	RV		
USC	BCS	Not released												23	23		25	
Utah	AP									RV								
Utah	C			RV		RV												
Utah	Harris	Not released																
Utah	BCS	Not released																
Washington	AP	RV	20	19	17	16	15	16	20	RV	RV	RV	RV			RV	RV	25
Washington	C	RV	23	23	20	20	18	19	25	RV			RV			RV	RV	RV
Washington	Harris	Not released							25	RV	RV		RV		RV	RV		
Washington	BCS	Not released																
Washington State	AP																	
Washington State	C																	
Washington State	Harris	Not released																
Washington State	BCS	Not released																

== Schedule ==
Index to colors and formatting
Pac-12 member won
Pac-12 member lost
Pac-12 teams in **bold**

=== Week 1 ===
Date	Time	Visiting team	Home team	Site	TV	Result	Attendance	Ref.
August 29	5:00 p.m.	No. 24 **USC**	Hawaii	Aloha Stadium • Honolulu, HI	CBSSN	**W** 30–13	39,058	
August 29	6:00 p.m.	Utah State	**Utah**	Rice-Eccles Stadium • Salt Lake City (Battle of the Brothers)	FS1	**W** 30–26	45,237	
August 30	8:00 p.m.	Northern Arizona	**Arizona**	Arizona Stadium • Tucson, Arizona	P12N	**W** 35–0	53,793	
August 31	1:00 p.m.	Nicholls State	No. 3 **Oregon**	Autzen Stadium • Eugene, Oregon	FS1	**W** 66–3	57,769	
August 31	3:00 p.m.	Eastern Washington	No. 25 **Oregon State**	Reser Stadium • Corvallis, Oregon	P12N	**L** 46–49	41,649	
August 31	4:00 p.m.	**Washington State**	Auburn	Jordan–Hare Stadium • Auburn, Alabama	ESPNU	**L** 24–31	85,095	
August 31	7:00 p.m.	No. 19 Boise State	**Washington**	Husky Stadium • Seattle	FS1	**W** 38–6	71,963	
August 31	7:00 p.m.	Nevada	No. 21 **UCLA**	Rose Bowl • Pasadena, California	P12N	**W** 58–20	60,562	
August 31	7:30 p.m.	No. 22 Northwestern	**California**	California Memorial Stadium • Berkeley, California	ESPN2	**L** 30–44	58,816	
September 1	3:00 p.m.	Colorado State	**Colorado**	Sports Authority Field at Mile High • Denver, Colorado (Rocky Mountain Showdown)	CBSSN	**W** 41–27	59,601	
^{#}Rankings from AP Poll released prior to game. All times are in Pacific Time.

=== Week 2 ===
Date	Time	Visiting team	Home team	Site	TV	Result	Attendance	Ref.
September 5	7:00 p.m.	Sacramento State	**Arizona State**	Sun Devil Stadium • Tempe, Arizona	P12N	**W** 55–0	55,743	
September 7	12:00 p.m.	Weber State	**Utah**	Rice-Eccles Stadium • Salt Lake City, Utah	P12N	**W** 70–7	45,053	
September 7	12:30 p.m.	No. 2 **Oregon**	Virginia	Scott Stadium • Charlottesville, Virginia	ABC	**W** 59–10	58,502	
September 7	2:00 p.m.	Portland State	**California**	California Memorial Stadium • Berkeley, California	P12N	**W** 37–30	43,594	
September 7	5:00 p.m.	Hawaii	**Oregon State**	Reser Stadium • Corvallis, Oregon	P12N	**W** 33–14	38,179	
September 7	6:00 p.m.	Central Arkansas	**Colorado**	Folsom Field • Boulder, Colorado	P12N	**W** 38–24	35,168	
September 7	6:30 p.m.	**Arizona**	UNLV	Sam Boyd Stadium • Whitney, Nevada	CBSSN	**W** 58–13	26,950	
September 7	7:30 p.m.	**Washington State**	No. 25 **USC**	Los Angeles Memorial Coliseum • Los Angeles	FS1	**WSU** 10–7	77,823	
September 7	8:00 p.m.	San Jose State	No. 5 **Stanford**	Stanford Stadium • Stanford, California	P12N	**W** 34–13	50,424	
^{#}Rankings from AP Poll released prior to game. All times are in Pacific Time.

=== Week 3 ===
Date	Time	Visiting team	Home team	Site	TV	Result	Attendance	Ref.
September 14	9:00 a.m.	No. 16 **UCLA**	No. 23 Nebraska	Memorial Stadium • Lincoln, Nebraska	ABC	**W** 41–21	91,471	
September 14	9:00 a.m.	No. 5 **Stanford**	Army	Michie Stadium • West Point, New York	CBSSN	**W** 34–20	39,644	
September 14	11:00 a.m.	Fresno State	**Colorado**	Folsom Field • Boulder, Colorado	P12N	(Cancelled)		
September 14	12:00 p.m.	Boston College	**USC**	Los Angeles Memorial Coliseum • Los Angeles	P12N	**W** 35–7	62,006	
September 14	12:30 p.m.	Tennessee	No. 2 **Oregon**	Autzen Stadium • Eugene, Oregon	ABC	**W** 59–14	57,895	
September 14	3:00 p.m.	No. 19 **Washington**	Illinois	Soldier Field • Chicago	BTN	**W** 34–24	47,312	
September 14	3:30 p.m.	Southern Utah	**Washington State**	Martin Stadium • Pullman, Washington	P12N	**W** 48–10	31,127	
September 14	4:00 p.m.	No. 4 Ohio State	**California**	California Memorial Stadium • Berkeley, California	FOX	**L** 34–52	62,467	
September 14†	7:00 p.m.	**Oregon State**	**Utah**	Rice-Eccles Stadium • Salt Lake City	FS1	**ORST** 51–48 ^{OT}	45,221	
September 14	7:30 p.m.	UTSA	**Arizona**	Arizona Stadium • Tucson, Arizona	P12N	**W** 51–48	41,661	
September 14	7:30 p.m.	No. 20 Wisconsin	**Arizona State**	Sun Devil Stadium • Tempe, Arizona	ESPN	**W** 32–30	66,155	
^{#}Rankings from AP Poll released prior to game. All times are in Pacific Time.

=== Week 4 ===
Date	Time	Visiting team	Home team	Site	TV	Result	Attendance	Ref.
September 21†	12:00 p.m.	Idaho State	No. 17 **Washington**	Husky Stadium • Seattle	P12N	**W** 56–0	67,093	
September 21	12:30 p.m.	Utah State	**USC**	Los Angeles Memorial Coliseum • Los Angeles	ABC/ESPN2	**W** 17–14	63,482	
September 21	4:00 p.m.	No. 23 **Arizona State**	No. 5 **Stanford**	Stanford Stadium • Stanford, California	FOX	**STAN** 42–28	50,424	
September 21	4:30 p.m.	**Oregon State**	San Diego State	Qualcomm Stadium • San Diego	CBSSN	**W** 34–30	32,133	
September 21	7:15 p.m.	**Utah**	BYU	LaVell Edwards Stadium • Provo, Utah (Holy War)	ESPN2	**W** 20–13	63,470	
September 21	7:30 p.m.	New Mexico State	No. 13 **UCLA**	Rose Bowl • Pasadena, California	P12N	**W** 59–13	58,263	
September 21	7:30 p.m.	Idaho	**Washington State**	Martin Stadium • Pullman, Washington (Battle of the Palouse)	P12N	**W** 42–0	31,521	
^{#}Rankings from AP Poll released prior to game. All times are in Pacific Time.

=== Week 5 ===
Date	Time	Visiting team	Home team	Site	TV	Result	Attendance	Ref.
September 28	12:00 p.m.	**Colorado**	**Oregon State**	Reser Stadium • Corvallis OR	P12N	**ORST** 44–17	44,279	
September 28	4:00 p.m.	**Arizona**	No. 16 **Washington**	Husky Stadium • Seattle	FOX	**WASH** 31–13	65,815	
September 28	7:00 p.m.	No. 5 **Stanford**	**Washington State**	CenturyLink Field • Seattle	ESPN	**STAN** 55–17	40,095	
September 28	7:30 p.m.	**USC**	**Arizona State**	Sun Devil Stadium • Tempe, Arizona	ESPN2	**ASU** 62–41	64,987	
September 28	7:30 p.m.	**California**	No. 2 **Oregon**	Autzen Stadium • Eugene, Oregon	P12N	**ORE** 55–16	56,987	
^{#}Rankings from AP Poll released prior to game. All times are in Pacific Time.

=== Week 6 ===
Date	Time	Visiting team	Home team	Site	TV	Result	Attendance	Ref.
October 3	7:00 p.m.	No. 12 **UCLA**	**Utah**	Rice-Eccles Stadium • Salt Lake City	FS1	**UCLA** 34–27	45,272	
October 5†	1:00 p.m.	**Washington State**	**California**	California Memorial Stadium • Berkeley, California	FS1	**WSU** 44–22	44,682	
October 5	3:00 p.m.	No. 2 **Oregon**	**Colorado**	Folsom Field • Boulder, Colorado	P12N	**ORE** 57–16	45,944	
October 5	4:30 p.m.	No. 22 **Arizona State**	Notre Dame	AT&T Stadium • Arlington, Texas	NBC	**L** 34–37	66,960	
October 5	7:30 p.m.	No. 15 **Washington**	No. 5 **Stanford**	Stanford Stadium • Stanford, California	ESPN	**STAN** 31–28	50,424	
^{#}Rankings from AP Poll released prior to game. All times are in Pacific Time.

=== Week 7 ===
Date	Time	Visiting team	Home team	Site	TV	Result	Attendance	Ref.
October 10	7:30 p.m.	**Arizona**	**USC**	Los Angeles Memorial Coliseum • Los Angeles	FS1	**USC** 38–31	64,215	
October 12	1:00p.m.	No. 2 **Oregon**	No. 16 **Washington**	Husky Stadium • Seattle (Rivalry)	FS1	**ORE** 45–24	71,833	
October 12	3:00 p.m.	No. 5 **Stanford**	**Utah**	Rice-Eccles Stadium • Salt Lake City	P12N	**UTAH** 27–21	45,372	
October 12	7:00 p.m.	**Colorado**	**Arizona State**	Sun Devil Stadium • Tempe, Arizona	P12N	**ASU** 54–13	50,104	
October 12	7:30 p.m.	**California**	No. 11 **UCLA**	Rose Bowl • Pasadena, California	ESPN2	**UCLA** 37–10	84,272	
October 12	7:30 p.m.	**Oregon State**	**Washington State**	Martin Stadium • Pullman, Washington	ESPNU	**ORST** 52–24	31,955	
^{#}Rankings from AP Poll released prior to game. All times are in Pacific Time.

=== Week 8 ===
Date	Time	Visiting team	Home team	Site	TV	Result	Attendance	Ref.
October 19	11:00 a.m.	Charleston Southern	**Colorado**	Folsom Field • Boulder, Colorado	P12N	**W** 43–10	36,730	
October 19†	12:30 p.m.	No. 9 **UCLA**	No. 13 **Stanford**	Stanford Stadium • Stanford, California	ABC/ESPN2	**STAN** 24–10	51,424	
October 19†	3:00 p.m.	No. 20 **Washington**	**Arizona State**	Sun Devil Stadium • Tempe, Arizona	P12N	**ASU** 53–24	60,057	
October 19	4:30 p.m.	**USC**	Notre Dame	Notre Dame Stadium • Notre Dame, Indiana (Jeweled Shillelagh / Rivalry)	NBC	**L** 10–14	80,975	
October 19	7:00 p.m.	**Utah**	**Arizona**	Arizona Stadium • Tucson, Arizona	P12N	**ARIZ** 35–24	50,871	
October 19†	7:00 p.m.	**Washington State**	No. 2 **Oregon**	Autzen Stadium • Eugene, Oregon	FS1	**ORE** 62–38	56,949	
October 19	7:30 p.m.	**Oregon State**	**California**	California Memorial Stadium • Berkeley, California	ESPN2	**ORST** 49–17	44,671	
^{#}Rankings from AP Poll released prior to game. All times are in Pacific Time.

=== Week 9 ===
Date	Time	Visiting team	Home team	Site	TV	Result	Attendance	Ref.
October 26	1:00 p.m.	**Utah**	**USC**	Los Angeles Memorial Coliseum • Los Angeles	P12N	**USC** 19–3	64,715	
October 26	4:00 p.m.	No. 12 **UCLA**	No. 2 **Oregon**	Autzen Stadium • Eugene, Oregon	ESPN	**ORE** 42–14	59,206	
October 26†	5:00 p.m.	**Arizona**	**Colorado**	Folsom Field • Boulder, Colorado	P12N	**ARIZ** 44–20	38,679	
October 26†	7:30 p.m.	No. 8 **Stanford**	**Oregon State**	Reser Stadium • Corvallis, Oregon	ESPN	**STAN** 20–12	44,519	
October 26†	8:00 p.m.	**California**	**Washington**	Husky Stadium • Seattle	FS1	**WASH** 41–17	66,328	
^{#}Rankings from AP Poll released prior to game. All times are in Pacific Time.

=== Week 10 ===
Date	Time	Visiting team	Home team	Site	TV	Result	Attendance	Ref.
October 31	7:30 p.m.	#25 **Arizona State**	**Washington State**	Martin Stadium • Pullman, Washington	ESPN	**ASU** 55–21	20,617	
November 1	6:00 p.m.	**USC**	**Oregon State**	Reser Stadium • Corvallis, Oregon	ESPN2	**USC** 31–14	45,379	
November 2	12:30 p.m.	**Arizona**	**California**	California Memorial Stadium • Berkeley, California	P12N	**ARIZ** 33–28	41,874	
November 2†	4:30 p.m.	**Colorado**	#17 **UCLA**	Rose Bowl • Pasadena, California	FS1	**UCLA** 45–23	80,377	
^{#}Rankings from AP Poll released prior to game. All times are in Pacific Time.

=== Week 11 ===
Date	Time	Visiting team	Home team	Site	TV	Result	Attendance	Ref.
November 7	6:00 p.m.	No. 2 **Oregon**	No. 6 **Stanford**	Stanford Stadium • Stanford, California	ESPN	**STAN** 26–20	51,545	
November 9	12:00 p.m.	**USC**	**California**	California Memorial Stadium • Berkeley, California	FOX	**USC** 62–28	49,199	
November 9	1:00 p.m.	No. 23 **Arizona State**	**Utah**	Rice-Eccles Stadium • Salt Lake City	P12N	**ASU** 20–19	45,183	
November 9	5:00 p.m.	**Colorado**	**Washington**	Husky Stadium • Seattle	P12N	**WASH** 59–7	66,599	
November 9†	7:00 p.m.	No. 16 **UCLA**	**Arizona**	Arizona Stadium • Tucson, Arizona	ESPN	**UCLA** 31–26	51,531	
^{#}Rankings from AP Poll released prior to game. All times are in Pacific Time.

=== Week 12 ===
Date	Time	Visiting team	Home team	Site	TV	Result	Attendance	Ref.
November 15	6:00 p.m.	**Washington**	No. 13 **UCLA**	Rose Bowl • Pasadena, California	ESPN2	**UCLA** 41–31	68,106	
November 16	11:00 a.m.	**Washington State**	**Arizona**	Arizona Stadium • Tucson, Arizona	P12N	**WSU** 24–17	42,080	
November 16	1:00 p.m.	**Utah**	No. 6 **Oregon**	Autzen Stadium • Eugene, Oregon	FS1	**ORE** 44–21	56,481	
November 16	2:30 p.m.	**California**	**Colorado**	Folsom Field • Boulder, Colorado	P12N	**COLO** 41–24	38,252	
November 16†	5:00 p.m.	No. 5 **Stanford**	**USC**	Los Angeles Memorial Coliseum • Los Angeles	ABC	**USC** 20–17	93,607	
November 16	6:30 p.m.	**Oregon State**	No. 21 **Arizona State**	Sun Devil Stadium • Tempe, Arizona	P12N	**ASU** 30–17	62,386	
^{#}Rankings from AP Poll released prior to game. All times are in Pacific Time.

=== Week 13 ===
Date	Time	Visiting team	Home team	Site	TV	Result	Attendance	Ref.
November 23	12:30 p.m.	No. 5 **Oregon**	**Arizona**	Arizona Stadium • Tucson, Arizona	ABC/ESPN2	**ARIZ** 42–16	45,777	
November 23	12:30 p.m.	**Utah**	**Washington State**	Martin Stadium • Pullman, Washington	P12N	**WSU** 49–37	23,112	
November 23	1:00 p.m.	**California**	No. 10 **Stanford**	Stanford Stadium • Stanford, California (Big Game)	FS1	**STAN** 63–13	50,424	
November 23	4:00 p.m.	No. 19 **Arizona State**	No. 14 **UCLA**	Rose Bowl • Pasadena, California	FOX	**ASU** 38–33	70,131	
November 23	6:30 p.m.	No. 23 **USC**	**Colorado**	Folsom Field • Boulder, Colorado	P12N	**USC** 47–29	36,005	
November 23	7:30 p.m.	**Washington**	**Oregon State**	Reser Stadium • Corvallis, Oregon	ESPN2	**WASH** 69–27	43,779	
^{#}Rankings from AP Poll released prior to game. All times are in Pacific Time.

=== Week 14 ===
Date	Time	Visiting team	Home team	Site	TV	Result	Attendance	Ref.
November 29	12:30 p.m.	**Washington State**	**Washington**	Husky Stadium • Seattle (Apple Cup)	FOX	**WASH** 27–17	71,753	
November 29	4:00 p.m.	**Oregon State**	No. 12 **Oregon**	Autzen Stadium • Eugene, Oregon (Civil War)	FS1	**ORE** 36–35	58,330	
November 30	11:00 a.m.	**Colorado**	**Utah**	Rice-Eccles Stadium • Salt Lake City, Utah (Rumble in the Rockies)	P12N	**UTAH** 24–17	45,023	
November 30	4:00 p.m.	No. 25 Notre Dame	No. 8 **Stanford**	Stanford Stadium • Stanford, California (Legends Trophy)	FOX	**W** 27–20	50,537	
November 30	5:00 p.m.	No. 22 **UCLA**	No. 23 **USC**	Los Angeles Memorial Coliseum • Los Angeles (Victory Bell)	ABC	**UCLA** 35–14	86,037	
November 30	6:30 p.m.	**Arizona**	No. 13 **Arizona State**	Sun Devil Stadium • Tempe, Arizona (Duel in the Desert)	P12N	**ASU** 58–21	72,542	
^{#}Rankings from AP Poll released prior to game. All times are in Pacific Time.

=== Week 15 (Pac-12 Championship Game) ===
Date	Time	Visiting team	Home team	Site	TV	Result	Attendance	Ref.
December 7	5:00 p.m.	No. 7 **Stanford**	No. 11 Arizona State	Sun Devil Stadium • Tempe, Arizona (2013 Pac-12 Football Championship Game)	ABC	**STAN** 38–14	69,535	
^{#}Rankings from AP Poll released prior to game. All times are in Pacific Time.

=== Bowl games ===
Bowl Game	Date	Stadium	City	Television	Time (PST)	Match-up	Team	Score	Team	Score
New Mexico Bowl	December 21	University Stadium	Albuquerque, New Mexico	ESPN	11:00 a.m.	Washington State vs. Colorado State	Colorado State	48	**Washington State**	**45**
Las Vegas Bowl	December 21	Sam Boyd Stadium	Paradise, Nevada	ABC	12:30 p.m.	USC vs. #21 Fresno State	**USC**	**45**	#21 Fresno State	20
Hawaii Bowl	December 24	Aloha Stadium	Honolulu, Hawaii	ESPN	5:00 p.m.	Oregon State vs. Boise State	**Oregon State**	**38**	Boise State	23
Fight Hunger Bowl	December 27	AT&T Park	San Francisco, California	ESPN	6:30 p.m.	Washington vs. BYU	**Washington**	**31**	BYU	16
Alamo Bowl	December 30	Alamodome	San Antonio	ESPN	3:45 p.m.	#10 Oregon vs. Texas	**#10 Oregon**	**30**	Texas	7
Holiday Bowl	December 30	Qualcomm Stadium	San Diego, California	ESPN	7:15 p.m.	#16 Arizona State vs. Texas Tech	Texas Tech	37	**#14 Arizona State**	**23**
Independence Bowl	December 31	Independence Stadium	Shreveport, Louisiana	ESPN	9:30 a.m.	Arizona vs. Boston College	**Arizona**	**42**	Boston College	19
Sun Bowl	December 31	Sun Bowl Stadium	El Paso, Texas	CBS	11:00 a.m.	#17 UCLA vs. Virginia Tech	**#17 UCLA**	**42**	Virginia Tech	12
Rose Bowl	January 1	Rose Bowl	Pasadena, California	ESPN	2:10 p.m.	#5 Stanford vs. #4 Michigan State	#4 Michigan State	24	**#5 Stanford**	**20**

== Pac-12 vs. BCS matchups ==
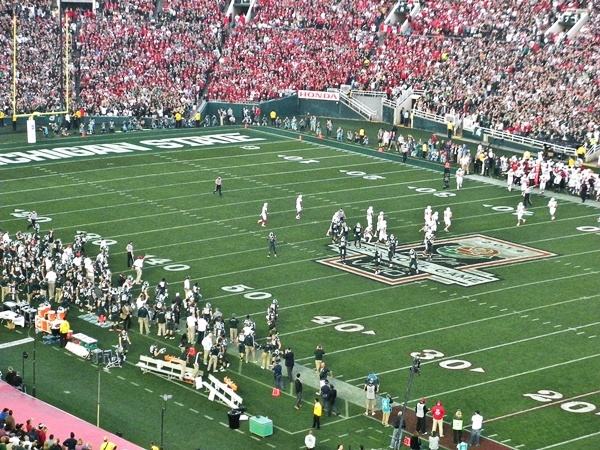
Michigan State defeated Stanford in the Rose Bowl Game on January 1, 2014

Date	Visitor	Home	Winning team	Opponent Conference	Notes
August 31	Washington State	Auburn	Auburn	SEC	
August 31	#22 Northwestern	California	Northwestern	Big Ten	
September 7	#2 Oregon	Virginia	Oregon	ACC	
September 14	#16 UCLA	#23 Nebraska	UCLA	Big Ten	
September 14	Boston College	USC	USC	ACC	
September 14	Tennessee	#2 Oregon	Oregon	SEC	
September 14	#19 Washington	Illinois	Washington	Big Ten	
September 14	#4 Ohio State	California	Ohio State	Big Ten	
September 14	#20 Wisconsin	Arizona State	Arizona State	Big Ten	
October 5	#22 Arizona State	Notre Dame	Notre Dame	Independent	
October 19	USC	Notre Dame	Notre Dame	Independent	
November 30	#25 Notre Dame	#8 Stanford	Stanford	Independent	
December 30	#10 Oregon	Texas	Oregon	Big 12	Alamo Bowl
December 30	#16 Arizona State	Texas Tech	Texas Tech	Big 12	Holiday Bowl
December 31	Arizona	Boston College	Arizona	ACC	Independence Bowl
December 31	#17 UCLA	Virginia Tech	UCLA	ACC	Sun Bowl
January 1	#5 Stanford	#4 Michigan State	Michigan State	Big Ten	Rose Bowl

Conference	Record
ACC	4–0
Big 12	1–1
Big Ten	3–3
SEC	1–1

== Players of the week ==
Following each week's games, Pac-12 conference officials select the players of the week from the conference's teams.

Week	Offensive			Defensive			Special teams		
Week	Player	Position	Team	Player	Position	Team	Player	Position	Team
9/2/13	Paul Richardson	WR	COLO	Tre’Mayne Bondurant	S	ARIZ	Vincenzo D’Amato	PK	CAL
9/9/13	De'Anthony Thomas	RB	ORE	Damante Horton	CB	WSU	Jake Smith	PK	ARIZ
9/16/13	Sean Mannion	QB	OSU	Anthony Barr	LB	UCLA	Trevor Romaine	PK	OSU
9/23/13	Travis Wilson	QB	Utah	Steven Nelson	CB	OSU	Kris Albarado	P	USC
9/30/13	Sean Mannion	QB	OSU	Alden Darby	Safety	ASU	Bralon Addison	WR/PR	ORE
10/7/13	Marcus Mariota	QB	ORE	Trent Murphy	LB	STAN	Ty Montgomery	WR/KR	STAN
10/14/13	Marcus Mariota	QB	ORE	Rashaad Reynolds	CB	OSU	Andy Phillips	K	UTAH
10/21/13	Ka'Deem Carey	RB	ARIZ	Jordan Richards	S	STAN	Zane Gonzalez	K	ASU
10/28/13	B.J. Denker	QB	ARIZ	Trent Murphy	LB	STAN	Travis Coons	P/K	WASH
11/4/13	Taylor Kelly	QB	ASU	Josh Shaw	CB	USC	Jayon Brown	LB	UCLA
11/11/13	Myles Jack	LB/RB	UCLA	Shayne Skov	LB	STAN	Nelson Agholor	WR/PR	USC
11/18/13	Cody Kessler	QB	USC	Robert Nelson	CB	ASU	Andre Heidari	PK	USC
11/25/13	Ka'Deem Carey	RB	ARIZ	Chris Young	LB	ARIZ	Ishmael Adams	DB	UCLA
12/2/13	Josh Huff	WR	ORE	Damarious Randall	S	ASU	Zane Gonzalez	PK	ASU

=== Position key ===
Center	C	Cornerback	CB	Defensive back	DB	Defensive end	DE
Defensive lineman	DL	Defensive tackle	DT	Guard	G	Kickoff returner	KR
Offensive tackle	OT	Offensive lineman	OL	Linebacker	LB	Long snapper	LS
Punter	P	Placekicker	PK	Punt returner	PR	Quarterback	QB
Running back	RB	Safety	S	Tight end	TE	Wide receiver	WR

== Home game attendance ==
Team	Stadium	Capacity	Game 1	Game 2	Game 3	Game 4	Game 5	Game 6	Game 7	Game 8	Total	Average	% of Capacity
Arizona	Arizona Stadium	57,400	53,793	41,661	50,871	51,531	42,080	—	—	—	239,936	47,987	83.60%
Arizona State	Sun Devil Stadium	71,706	55,743	66,155	64,987	50,104	60,057	62,386	72,542	69,535 ^{B}	359,432	59,905	83.54%
California	California Memorial Stadium	62,717	58,816	43,594	62,467	44,682	44,671	41,874	49,199	—	345,303	49,329	78.65%
Colorado	Folsom Field	53,613	35,168	45,944	36,730	38,679	38,252	36,005	—	—	230,778	38,463	71.74%
Oregon	Autzen Stadium	54,000	57,769	57,895	56,987	56,949	59,206	56,481	58,330	—	403,617	57,659	106.78%
Oregon State	Reser Stadium	45,674	41,649	38,179	44,279	44,519	45,379	—	—	—	214,005	42,801	93.71%
Stanford	Stanford Stadium	50,360	50,424	50,424	50,424	51,424	51,545	50,424	50,537	—	355,202	50,743	100.76%
UCLA	Rose Bowl	91,136	60,562	58,263	84,272	80,377	68,106	70,131	—	—	421,711	70,285	77.12%
USC	Los Angeles Memorial Coliseum	93,607	77,823	62,006	63,482	64,215	64,715	93,607	86,037	—	425,848	70,975	75.82%
Utah	Rice-Eccles Stadium	45,017	45,237	45,053	45,221	45,272	45,372	45,183	—	—	271,338	45,223	100.46%
Washington	Husky Stadium	70,138	71,963	67,093	65,815	71,833	66,328	66,599	—	—	409,631	68,272	97.34%
Washington State	Martin Stadium	32,760	31,127	31,521	40,095 ^{A}	31,955	20,617	—	—	—	155,220	28,805	87.93%

Sellout ^A Game played at CenturyLink Field in Seattle.
^B Pac-12 Championship Game

== Awards and honors ==
Doak Walker Award

Maxwell Award

Walter Camp Player of the Year Award

Pac-12 Morris Trophy (top lineman)

- Xavier Su'a-Filo, UCLA; Will Sutton, ASU

=== All-Americans ===
Academic All-America Team Member of the Year (CoSIDA)

AFCA Coaches' All-Americans First Team:

=== All-Pac-12 teams ===
- Offensive Player of the Year: Ka'Deem Carey, RB, Arizona
- Pat Tillman Defensive Player of the Year: Will Sutton, DE, Arizona State
- Offensive Freshman of the Year: Myles Jack, RB, UCLA
- Defensive Freshman of the Year: Myles Jack, LB, UCLA
- Coach of the Year: Todd Graham, Arizona State

Offense:

Pos.	Name	Yr.	School	Name	Yr.	School
First Team				Second Team		
QB	Marcus Mariota (2)	So.	Oregon	Taylor Kelly	Jr.	Arizona State
RB	Ka'Deem Carey (2)	Jr.	Arizona	Tyler Gaffney	Sr.	Stanford
RB	Bishop Sankey	Jr.	Washington	Marion Grice	Sr.	Arizona State
WR	Brandin Cooks	Jr.	Oregon State	Ty Montgomery	Jr.	Stanford
WR	Paul Richardson	Jr.	Colorado	Jaelen Strong	So.	Arizona State
TE	Chris Coyle	Sr.	Arizona State	Austin Seferian-Jenkins	Jr.	Washington
OL	Evan Finkenberg	Sr.	Arizona State	Jamil Douglas	Jr.	Arizona State
OL	Hroniss Grasu	Jr.	Oregon	Cameron Fleming	Sr.	Stanford
OL	Marcus Martin	Jr.	USC	Andrus Peat	So.	Stanford
OL	Xavier Su'a-Filo (2)	Jr.	UCLA	Isaac Seumalo	So.	Oregon State
OL	David Yankey (2)	Sr.	Stanford	Khalil Wilkes	Sr.	Stanford

Defense:

Pos.	Name	Yr.	School	Name	Yr.	School
First Team				Second Team		
DL	Ben Gardner	Sr.	Stanford	Scott Crichton	Jr.	Oregon State
DL	Trevor Reilly	Sr.	Utah	Taylor Hart	Sr.	Oregon
DL	Will Sutton	Sr.	Arizona State	Devon Kennard	Sr.	USC
DL	Leonard Williams	So.	USC	Hau'oli Kikaha	Jr.	Washington
LB	Anthony Barr (2)	Sr.	UCLA	Tenny Palepoi	Sr.	Utah
LB	Trent Murphy (2)	Sr.	Stanford	Myles Jack	Fr.	UCLA
LB	Shayne Skov	Sr.	Stanford	Hayes Pullard	Jr.	USC
LB	—	—	—	Chris Young	Sr.	Arizona State
DB	Deone Bucannon	Sr.	Washington State	Dion Bailey	Jr.	USC
DB	Alden Darby	Sr.	Arizona State	Osahon Irabor	Sr.	Arizona State
DB	Ifo Ekpre-Olomu	Jr.	Oregon	Marcus Peters	So.	Washington
DB	Robert Nelson	Sr.	Arizona State	Rashaad Reynolds	Sr.	Oregon State
DB	Ed Reynolds (2)	Sr.	Stanford	—	—	—

Specialists:

Pos.	Name	Yr.	School	Name	Yr.	School
First Team				Second Team		
PK	Zane Gonzalez	Fr.	Arizona State	Vincenzo D'Amato	Sr.	California
P	Tom Hackett	So.	Utah	Travis Coons	Sr.	Washington
RS	Ty Montgomery	Jr.	Stanford	Nelson Agholor	So.	USC
ST	Soma Vainuk	So.	USC	Erick Dargan	Jr.	Oregon
ST	—	—	—	Joe Hemschoot	Sr.	Stanford
ST	—	—	—	Ryan Hofmeister	Jr.	UCLA

=== All-Academic ===
First team

Pos.	Name	School	Yr.	GPA	Major
QB	Connor Wood	Colorado (2)	Jr.	3.39	Business-Finance
RB	Phillip Ruhl	UCLA	RS Jr.	3.37	Political Science
RB	Patrick Skov	Stanford (2)	Jr.	3.39	International Relations
WR	Jordan Pratt	Stanford	Jr.	3.84	Engineering
WR	Kristoff Williams	Washington State	Jr.	3.65	Criminal Justice
TE	Dustin Stanton	Oregon State	RS Fr.	3.58	University Exploratory Studies
OL	Chris Adcock	California (2)	Jr.	3.54	Business Administration
OL	Mark Brazinski	California (2)	Sr./Grad.	3.58	Business Administration/Legal Studies/Info Manag. Systems
OL	Jake Brendel	UCLA (2)	RS So.	3.49	Economics
OL	Marc Pouvave	Utah	Jr.	3.59	Communication
OL	Isaac Sumalo	Oregon State	So.	3.52	Business
DL	Henry Anderson	Stanford (2)	Sr.	3.56	Political Science
DL	Nate Bonsu	Colorado	Sr.	3.38	International Affairs & Political Science
DL	Hau’oli Kikaha	Washington	Jr.	3.49	American Ethnic Studies
DL	Danny Shelton	Washington (2)	Jr.	3.46	Anthropology
LB	Charles Burks	USC	So.	3.37	Political Science
LB	Jake Fischer	Arizona (3)	Sr.	3.36	Marketing
LB	V.J. Fehoko	Utah	Jr.	3.32	Sociology
DB	Steven Christian	Oregon State	Sr.	3.49	Interdisciplinary Studies (Grad)
DB	Marlon Pollard	Arizona State	Sr.	4.00	Liberal Studies (Film and Media)
DB	Jordan Richards	Stanford (2)	Jr.	3.42	Public Policy
DB	Jared Tevis	Arizona (2)	Jr.	3.22	Finance
PK	Will Oliver	Colorado	Jr.	3.67	Business-Finance
P	Ben Rhyne	Stanford	Sr.	3.88	Engineering
ST	Jerry Neuheisel	UCLA	RS Fr.	3.56	Undecided
Notes:		(2) Two-time, (3) Three-time			

== Drafted Players ==
2014 NFL draft

Rnd.	Pick #	College	Player	Pos.	NFL team	Notes
1	9	UCLA	Anthony Barr	LB	Minnesota Vikings	
1	20	Oregon State	Brandin Cooks	WR	New Orleans Saints	
1	27	Washington State	Deone Bucannon	S	Arizona Cardinals	
2	33	UCLA	Xavier Su'a-Filo	OG	Houston Texans	
2	38	Washington	Austin Seferian-Jenkins	TE	Tampa Bay Buccaneers	
2	39	USC	Marqise Lee	WR	Jacksonville Jaguars	
2	45	Colorado	Paul Richardson	WR	Seattle Seahawks	
2	47	Stanford	Trent Murphy	TE	Washington Redskins	
2	54	Washington	Bishop Sankey	RB	Tennessee Titans	
3	70	USC	Marcus Martin	C	San Francisco 49ers	
3	72	Oregon State	Scott Crichton	DE	Minnesota Vikings	
3	82	Arizona State	Will Sutton	DT	Chicago Bears	
3	86	Oregon	Josh Huff	WR	Philadelphia Eagles	
3	98	California	Richard Rodgers	TE	Green Bay Packers	
4	108	UCLA	Cassius Marsh	DE	Seattle Seahawks	
4	115	UCLA	Shaq Evans	WR	New York Jets	
4	116	Utah	Keith McGill	CB	Oakland Raiders	
4	117	Arizona	Ka'Deem Carey	RB	Chicago Bears	
4	121	Arizona State	Carl Bradford	LB	Green Bay Packers	
4	124	Oregon	De'Anthony Thomas	RB	Kansas City Chiefs	
4	126	California	Khairi Fortt	LB	New Orleans Saints	
4	140	Stanford	Cameron Fleming	OT	New England Patriots	
5	141	Oregon	Taylor Hart	DT	Philadelphia Eagles	
5	145	Stanford	David Yankey	OG	Minnesota Vikings	
5	157	Arizona	Shaquille Richardson	CB	Pittsburgh Steelers	
5	162	Stanford	Ed Reynolds	FS	Philadelphia Eagles	
5	174	USC	Devon Kennard	LB	New York Giants	
6	192	UCLA	Jordan Zumwalt	LB	Pittsburgh Steelers	
6	201	Arizona State	Marion Grice	RB	San Diego Chargers	
6	204	Stanford	Tyler Gaffney	RB	Carolina Panthers	
6	212	Arizona	Marquis Flowers	LB	Cincinnati Bengals	
7	231	Stanford	Ben Gardner	DE	Dallas Cowboys	
7	233	Utah	Trevor Reilly	LB	New York Jets	
7	254	Oregon	Terrance Mitchell	CB	Dallas Cowboys	

Team	Rd 1	Rd 2	Rd 3	Rd 4	Rd 5	Rd 6	Rd 7	TOT
Arizona				1	1	1		3
Arizona State			1	1		1		3
California			1	1				2
Colorado		1						1
Oregon				1	1	1	1	4
Oregon State	1		1					2
Stanford		1		1	2	1	1	6
UCLA	1	1		2		1		5
USC		1	1		1			3
Utah				1			1	2
Washington		2						2
Washington State	1							1
Pac-12	3	6	4	8	5	5	3	34

== Notes ==
- March 4, 2013 – Oregon State introduced a new logo and uniforms
