= 2013 Northern Colorado Bears football team =

American college football season

2013 Northern Colorado Bears football
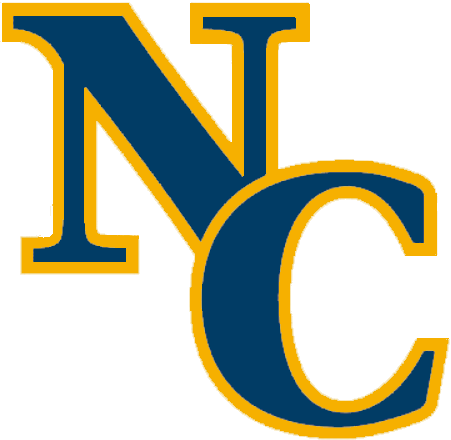
- Conference: Big Sky Conference
- Record: 1–11 (0–8 Big Sky)
- Head coach: Earnest Collins Jr. (3rd season)
- Offensive coordinator: Michael Armour (3rd season)
- Offensive scheme: Spread
- Defensive coordinator: Zach Shay (3rd season)
- Base defense: 4–3
- Home stadium: Nottingham Field

2013 Big Sky Conference football standings
	Conf.			Overall
Team	W		L	W		L
No. 3 Eastern Washington $^	8	–	0	12	–	3
No. 5 Northern Arizona ^	7	–	1	9	–	3
No. 8 Montana ^	6	–	2	10	–	3
No. 21 Southern Utah ^	5	–	3	8	–	5
No. 20 Montana State	5	–	3	7	–	5
Cal Poly	5	–	3	6	–	6
UC Davis	5	–	3	5	–	7
Sacramento State	4	–	4	5	–	7
Portland State	3	–	5	6	–	6
North Dakota	2	–	6	3	–	8
Idaho State	1	–	7	3	–	9
Weber State	1	–	7	2	–	10
Northern Colorado	0	–	8	1	–	11
$ – Conference champion; ^ – FCS playoff participant; Rankings from The Sports Network poll

The 2013 Northern Colorado Bears football team represented the University of Northern Colorado in the 2013 NCAA Division I FCS football season. They were led by third-year head coach Earnest Collins Jr. and played their home games at Nottingham Field. They were a member of the Big Sky Conference. They finished the season 1–11, 0–8 in Big Sky play to finish in last place.

== Schedule ==
Date	Time	Opponent	Site	TV	Result	Attendance
August 31	1:35 pm	Langston*	Nottingham Field; Greeley, CO	BSTV	W 31–10	4,311
September 7	1:35 pm	No. 6 (D-II) CSU–Pueblo*	Nottingham Field; Greeley, CO	BSTV	L 36–41	4,619
September 14	2:00 pm	at Wyoming*	War Memorial Stadium; Laramie, WY		L 7–35	19,091
September 21	1:35 pm	No. 7 Northern Iowa*	Nottingham Field; Greeley, CO	BSTV	L 7–26	3,025
September 28	1:35 pm	Southern Utah^{†}	Nottingham Field; Greeley, CO	BSTV	L 21–27	4,361
October 5	7:05 pm	at Sacramento State	Hornet Stadium; Sacramento, CA	BSTV	L 21–37	9,012
October 12	3:00 pm	at Idaho State	Holt Arena; Pocatello, ID	BSTV	L 26–40	4,574
October 19	1:35 pm	UC Davis	Nottingham Field; Greeley, CO	BSTV	L 18–34	4,196
November 2	12:05 pm	No. 5 Montana State	Nottingham Field; Greeley, CO	RTRM	L 28–35	3,478
November 9	12:00 pm	at North Dakota	Alerus Center; Grand Forks, ND	BSTV	L 21–24	5,984
November 16	12:00 pm	at No. 12 Northern Arizona	Walkup Skydome; Flagstaff, AZ	NAU-TV/BSTV	L 7–24	6,737
November 23	12:05 pm	Cal Poly	Nottingham Field; Greeley, CO	BSTV	L 14–42	2,774
*Non-conference game; ^{†}Homecoming; Rankings from The Sports Network Poll released prior to the game; All times are in Mountain time

== Game summaries ==
=== Langston ===
	1	2	3	4	Total
Lions	3	0	0	7	10
Bears	0	10	14	7	31

=== CSU-Pueblo ===
	1	2	3	4	Total
#2 (D-II) Thunderwolves	0	28	6	7	41
Bears	3	20	6	7	36

=== @ Wyoming ===
	1	2	3	4	Total
Bears	0	0	0	7	7
Cowboys	0	21	0	14	35

=== Northern Iowa ===
	1	2	3	4	Total
#7 Panthers	7	3	3	13	26
Bears	0	0	7	0	7

=== Southern Utah ===
	1	2	3	4	Total
Thunderbirds	3	14	7	3	27
Bears	0	7	7	7	21

=== @ Sacramento State ===
	1	2	3	4	Total
Bears	7	7	0	7	21
Hornets	10	21	6	0	37

=== @ Idaho State ===
	1	2	3	4	Total
Bears	0	16	7	3	26
Bengals	7	20	10	3	40

=== UC Davis ===
	1	2	3	4	Total
Aggies	14	10	7	3	34
Bears	0	0	7	11	18

=== Montana State ===
	1	2	3	4	Total
#5 Bobcats	14	7	6	8	35
Bears	7	7	0	14	28

=== @ North Dakota ===
	1	2	3	4	Total
Bears	7	0	14	0	21
UND	0	6	10	8	24

=== @ Northern Arizona ===
	1	2	3	4	Total
Bears	0	0	0	7	7
#12 Lumberjacks	3	7	7	7	24

=== Cal Poly ===
	1	2	3	4	Total
Mustangs	0	21	7	14	42
Bears	0	0	7	7	14
