= 2013 Cal Poly Mustangs football team =

American college football season

2013 Cal Poly Mustangs football
- Conference: Big Sky Conference
- Record: 6–6 (5–3 Big Sky)
- Head coach: Tim Walsh (5th season)
- Offensive coordinator: Saga Tuitele (5th season)
- Offensive scheme: Spread triple-option
- Defensive coordinator: Josh Brown (2nd season)
- Base defense: Multiple 4–3
- Home stadium: Alex G. Spanos Stadium

2013 Big Sky Conference football standings
	Conf.			Overall
Team	W		L	W		L
No. 3 Eastern Washington $^	8	–	0	12	–	3
No. 5 Northern Arizona ^	7	–	1	9	–	3
No. 8 Montana ^	6	–	2	10	–	3
No. 21 Southern Utah ^	5	–	3	8	–	5
No. 20 Montana State	5	–	3	7	–	5
Cal Poly	5	–	3	6	–	6
UC Davis	5	–	3	5	–	7
Sacramento State	4	–	4	5	–	7
Portland State	3	–	5	6	–	6
North Dakota	2	–	6	3	–	8
Idaho State	1	–	7	3	–	9
Weber State	1	–	7	2	–	10
Northern Colorado	0	–	8	1	–	11
$ – Conference champion; ^ – FCS playoff participant; Rankings from The Sports Network poll

The 2013 Cal Poly Mustangs football team represented California Polytechnic State University, San Luis Obispo as member of the Big Sky Conference during the 2013 NCAA Division I FCS football season. Led by fifth-year head coach Tim Walsh, Cal Poly compiled an overall record of 6–6 with a mark of 5–3 in conference play, placing in a four-way tie for fourth in the Big Sky. The Mustangs played home games at Mustang Stadium in San Luis Obispo, California.

== Schedule ==
Date	Time	Opponent	Rank	Site	TV	Result	Attendance
August 31	4:05 pm	San Diego*	No. 14	Alex G. Spanos Stadium; San Luis Obispo, CA	BSTV	W 38–16	5,840
September 7	7:00 pm	at Fresno State*	No. 12	Bulldog Stadium; Fresno, CA	ESPN3	L 25–41	33,260
September 14	12:30 pm	at Colorado State*	No. 14	Hughes Stadium; Fort Collins, CO		L 17–34	14,146
September 26	7:00 pm	at Portland State	No. 18	Jeld-Wen Field; Portland, OR	RTNW	W 38–34	6,726
October 5	2:05 pm	Yale*	No. 18	Alex G. Spanos Stadium; San Luis Obispo, CA	BSTV	L 10–24	8,376
October 12	6:05 pm	Weber State		Alex G. Spanos Stadium; San Luis Obispo, CA	BSTV	W 47–0	5,824
October 19	12:30 pm	at No. 10 Montana		Washington–Grizzly Stadium; Missoula, MT	KCOY	L 14–21 ^{OT}	25,913
October 26	6:05 pm	No. 16 Northern Arizona		Alex G. Spanos Stadium; San Luis Obispo, CA	BSTV	L 13–17	9,882
November 2	4:00 pm	at UC Davis		Aggie Stadium; Davis, CA (Battle for the Golden Horseshoe)	BSTV	W 34–16	7,768
November 9	6:05 pm	Sacramento State		Alex G. Spanos Stadium; San Luis Obispo, CA	BSTV	W 42–7	7,031
November 16	12:30 pm	No. 3 Eastern Washington^{†}		Alex G. Spanos Stadium; San Luis Obispo, CA	RTNW	L 22–35	6,847
November 23	11:30 am	at Northern Colorado		Nottingham Field; Greeley, CO	BSTV	W 42–14	2,774
*Non-conference game; ^{†}Homecoming; Rankings from The Sports Network Poll released prior to the game; All times are in Pacific time

== Rankings ==
Ranking movements Legend: ██ Increase in ranking ██ Decrease in ranking — = Not ranked RV = Received votes
	Week														
Poll	Pre	1	2	3	4	5	6	7	8	9	10	11	12	13	Final
Sports Network	14	12	14	18	18	18	RV	RV	RV	RV	RV	RV	—	—	RV
Coaches	11	10	14	19	19	19	RV	RV	RV	—	RV	RV	—	—	RV

== Game summaries ==
=== San Diego ===
	1	2	3	4	Total
Toreros	3	7	0	6	16
#14 Mustangs	7	10	14	7	38

=== @ Fresno State ===
	1	2	3	4	Total
#12 Mustangs	0	0	10	15	25
Bulldogs	10	24	7	0	41

=== @ Colorado State ===
	1	2	3	4	Total
#14 Mustangs	3	7	7	0	17
Rams	13	14	0	7	34

=== @ Portland State ===
	1	2	3	4	Total
#18 Mustangs	0	7	14	17	38
Vikings	7	14	0	13	34

=== Yale ===
	1	2	3	4	Total
Bulldogs	7	0	10	7	24
#18 Mustangs	7	3	0	0	10

=== Weber State ===
	1	2	3	4	Total
Wildcats	0	0	0	0	0
Mustangs	6	14	14	13	47

=== @ Montana ===
	1	2	3	4	OT	Total
Mustangs	7	7	0	0	0	14
#10 Grizzlies	7	0	0	7	7	21

=== Northern Arizona ===
	1	2	3	4	Total
#16 Lumberjacks	3	7	0	7	17
Mustangs	0	10	0	3	13

=== @ UC Davis ===
	1	2	3	4	Total
Mustangs	0	13	7	14	34
Aggies	3	10	0	3	16

=== Sacramento State ===
	1	2	3	4	Total
Hornets	0	7	0	0	7
Mustangs	14	7	7	14	42

=== Eastern Washington ===
	1	2	3	4	Total
#3 Eagles	0	14	21	0	35
Mustangs	3	0	0	19	22

=== @ Northern Colorado ===
	1	2	3	4	Total
Mustangs	0	21	7	14	42
Bears	0	0	7	7	14
