= 2013 University of North Dakota football team =

American college football season

2013 University of North Dakota football
- Conference: Big Sky Conference
- Record: 3–8 (2–6 Big Sky)
- Head coach: Chris Mussman (6th season)
- Offensive coordinator: Luke Schleusner
- Defensive coordinator: Josh Kotelnicki (1st season)
- Base defense: Greg Hardin
- Home stadium: Alerus Center

2013 Big Sky Conference football standings
	Conf.			Overall
Team	W		L	W		L
No. 3 Eastern Washington $^	8	–	0	12	–	3
No. 5 Northern Arizona ^	7	–	1	9	–	3
No. 8 Montana ^	6	–	2	10	–	3
No. 21 Southern Utah ^	5	–	3	8	–	5
No. 20 Montana State	5	–	3	7	–	5
Cal Poly	5	–	3	6	–	6
UC Davis	5	–	3	5	–	7
Sacramento State	4	–	4	5	–	7
Portland State	3	–	5	6	–	6
North Dakota	2	–	6	3	–	8
Idaho State	1	–	7	3	–	9
Weber State	1	–	7	2	–	10
Northern Colorado	0	–	8	1	–	11
$ – Conference champion; ^ – FCS playoff participant; Rankings from The Sports Network poll

The 2013 University of North Dakota football team represented the University of North Dakota in the 2013 NCAA Division I FCS football season as a member of the Big Sky Conference. They were led by fifth-year head coach Chris Mussman and played their home games at the Alerus Center. North Dakota the season 3–8 overall and 2–6 in Big Sky play to place tenth.

On November 19, Mussman was fired. He posted a record of 31–36 in six seasons. On December 24, Southern Illinois defensive coordinator Kyle Schweigert was hired as the new North Dakota head coach.

== Schedule ==
Date	Time	Opponent	Site	TV	Result	Attendance
August 29	7:00 pm	Valparaiso*	Alerus Center; Grand Forks, ND	Midco SN	W 69–10	9,269
September 7	6:00 pm	No. 6 South Dakota State*	Alerus Center; Grand Forks, ND	Midco SN	L 28–35	10,038
September 14	6:00 pm	No. 11 Montana*	Alerus Center; Grand Forks, ND	Midco SN	L 17–55	9,726
September 28	2:30 pm	No. 11 Montana State	Alerus Center; Grand Forks, ND	Midco SN	L 20–63	8,899
October 5	3:00 pm	at Idaho State	Holt Arena; Pocatello, ID		W 28–25	7,568
October 12	2:30 pm	No. 6 Eastern Washington^{†}	Alerus Center; Grand Forks, ND	Midco SN	L 14–35	7,951
October 19	2:30 pm	Sacramento State	Alerus Center; Grand Forks, ND		L 7–31	6,634
October 26	3:00 pm	at Portland State	Jeld-Wen Field; Portland, OR		L 10–14	5,120
November 2	6:00 pm	at No. 14 Northern Arizona	Walkup Skydome; Flagstaff, AZ	FSAZ+	L 27–48	4,895
November 9	1:00 pm	Northern Colorado	Alerus Center; Grand Forks, ND	Midco SN	W 24–21	5,984
November 16	6:00 pm	at UC Davis	Aggie Stadium; Davis, CA		L 18–34	5,688
*Non-conference game; ^{†}Homecoming; Rankings from The Sports Network Poll released prior to the game; All times are in Central time

Despite Montana also being a member of the Big Sky Conference, the game on September 14 was considered a non-conference game and has no effect on the Big Sky standings.

== Game summaries ==
=== Valparaiso ===
	1	2	3	4	Total
Crusaders	0	0	10	0	10
North Dakota	21	14	14	20	69

=== South Dakota State ===
	1	2	3	4	Total
#6 Jackrabbits	7	14	7	7	35
North Dakota	7	0	7	14	28

=== Montana ===
	1	2	3	4	Total
#11 Grizzlies	20	13	14	8	55
North Dakota	7	3	7	0	17

=== Montana State ===
	1	2	3	4	Total
#11 Bobcats	14	28	14	7	63
North Dakota	0	7	7	6	20

=== @ Idaho State ===
	1	2	3	4	Total
North Dakota	0	14	7	7	28
Bengals	0	7	3	15	25

=== Eastern Washington ===
	1	2	3	4	Total
#6 Eagles	0	14	14	7	35
North Dakota	3	3	8	0	14

=== Sacramento State ===
	1	2	3	4	Total
Hornets	7	10	7	7	31
North Dakota	0	0	7	0	7

=== @ Portland State ===
	1	2	3	4	Total
North Dakota	7	3	0	0	10
Vikings	0	0	0	14	14

=== @ Northern Arizona ===
	1	2	3	4	Total
North Dakota	0	14	0	13	27
#14 Lumberjacks	7	21	6	14	48

=== Northern Colorado ===
	1	2	3	4	Total
Bears	7	0	14	0	21
North Dakota	0	6	10	8	24

=== @ UC Davis ===
	1	2	3	4	Total
North Dakota	3	6	0	9	18
Aggies	3	15	0	16	34
