= 2013 Montana State Bobcats football team =

American college football season

2013 Montana State Bobcats football
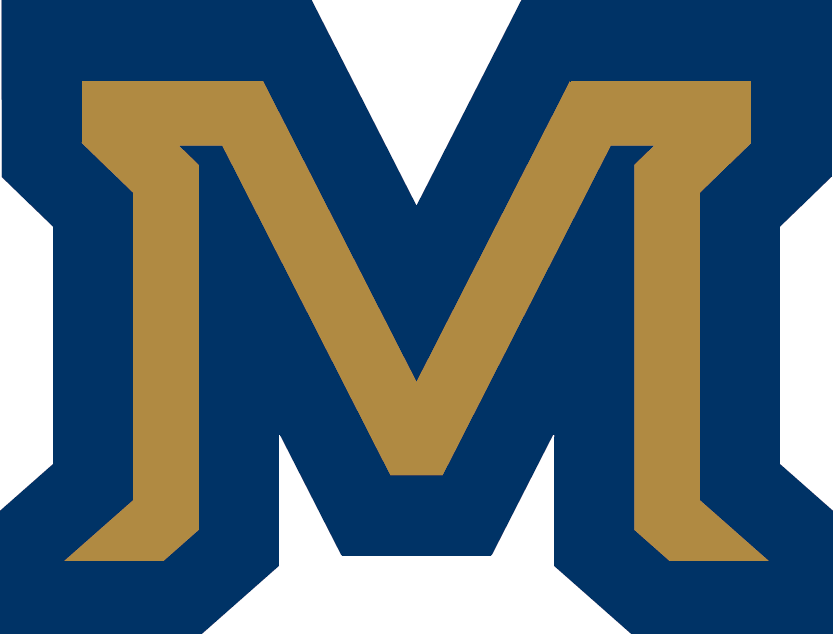
- Conference: Big Sky Conference

Ranking
- Sports Network: No. 20
- FCS Coaches: No. 20
- Record: 7–5 (5–3 Big Sky)
- Head coach: Rob Ash (7th season)
- Offensive coordinator: Tim Cramsey (1st season)
- Defensive coordinator: Jamie Marshall (7th season)
- Home stadium: Bobcat Stadium

2013 Big Sky Conference football standings
	Conf.			Overall
Team	W		L	W		L
No. 3 Eastern Washington $^	8	–	0	12	–	3
No. 5 Northern Arizona ^	7	–	1	9	–	3
No. 8 Montana ^	6	–	2	10	–	3
No. 21 Southern Utah ^	5	–	3	8	–	5
No. 20 Montana State	5	–	3	7	–	5
Cal Poly	5	–	3	6	–	6
UC Davis	5	–	3	5	–	7
Sacramento State	4	–	4	5	–	7
Portland State	3	–	5	6	–	6
North Dakota	2	–	6	3	–	8
Idaho State	1	–	7	3	–	9
Weber State	1	–	7	2	–	10
Northern Colorado	0	–	8	1	–	11
$ – Conference champion; ^ – FCS playoff participant; Rankings from The Sports Network poll

The 2013 Montana State Bobcats football team represented Montana State University as a member of the Big Sky Conference during the 2013 NCAA Division I FCS football season. Led by seventh-year head coach Rob Ash, Montana State compiled an overall record of 7–5 with a mark of 5–3 in conference play, tying for fourth place in the Big Sky. The Bobcats played their home games at Bobcat Stadium in Bozeman, Montana.

== Schedule ==
Date	Time	Opponent	Rank	Site	TV	Result	Attendance
August 29	7:05 pm	Monmouth*	No. 2	Bobcat Stadium; Bozeman, MT	MTSN/BSTV	W 42–24	21,007
September 7	6:00 pm	at SMU*	No. 3	Gerald J. Ford Stadium; University Park, TX	ESPN3	L 30–31	10,107
September 14	1:05 pm	Colorado Mesa*	No. 3	Bobcat Stadium; Bozeman, MT	MTSN/BSTV	W 26–0	17,847
September 21	5:00 pm	at Stephen F. Austin*	No. 3	Homer Bryce Stadium; Nacogdoches, TX	MTSN	L 38–52	9,433
September 28	1:35 pm	at North Dakota	No. 11	Alerus Center; Grand Forks, ND	MTSN/BSTV	W 63–20	8,899
October 5	2:35 pm	No. 15 Northern Arizona^{†}	No. 8	Bobcat Stadium; Bozeman, MT	MTSN/BSTV	W 36–7	21,027
October 19	5:05 pm	at Weber State	No. 5	Stewart Stadium; Ogden, UT	RTNW	W 34–16	5,616
October 26	2:35 pm	UC Davis	No. 5	Bobcat Stadium; Bozeman, MT	MTSN/BSTV	W 34–17	18,627
November 2	12:05 pm	at Northern Colorado	No. 5	Nottingham Field; Greeley, CO	RTNW	W 35–28	3,478
November 9	1:05 pm	at No. 3 Eastern Washington	No. 4	Roos Field; Cheney, WA	RTNW	L 29–54	10,223
November 16	4:05 pm	Southern Utah	No. 8	Bobcat Stadium; Bozeman, MT	MTSN/BSTV	L 14–22	18,187
November 23	12:05 pm	No. 5 Montana	No. 13	Bobcat Stadium; Bozeman, MT (rivalry)	RTNW	L 14–28	21,527
*Non-conference game; ^{†}Homecoming; Rankings from The Sports Network Poll released prior to the game; All times are in Mountain time

== Game summaries ==
=== Monmouth ===
	1	2	3	4	Total
Hawks	3	0	7	14	24
#2 Bobcats	22	17	3	0	42

=== @ SMU ===
	1	2	3	4	Total
#3 Bobcats	8	14	8	0	30
Mustangs	5	14	3	9	31

=== Colorado Mesa ===
	1	2	3	4	Total
Mavericks	0	0	0	0	0
#3 Bobcats	11	8	7	0	26

=== @ Stephen F. Austin ===
	1	2	3	4	Total
#3 Bobcats	9	15	6	8	38
Lumberjacks	17	14	0	21	52

=== @ North Dakota ===
	1	2	3	4	Total
#11 Bobcats	14	28	14	7	63
North Dakota	0	7	7	6	20

=== Northern Arizona ===
	1	2	3	4	Total
#15 Lumberjacks	0	0	7	0	7
#8 Bobcats	7	9	20	0	36

=== @ Weber State ===
	1	2	3	4	Total
#5 Bobcats	6	13	2	13	34
Wildcats	10	0	6	0	16

=== UC Davis ===
	1	2	3	4	Total
Aggies	0	10	0	7	17
#5 Bobcats	7	14	6	7	34

=== @ Northern Colorado ===
	1	2	3	4	Total
#5 Bobcats	14	7	6	8	35
Bears	7	7	0	14	28

=== @ Eastern Washington ===
	1	2	3	4	Total
#4 Bobcats	7	14	0	8	29
#3 Eagles	13	13	14	14	54

=== Southern Utah ===
	1	2	3	4	Total
Thunderbirds	3	6	6	7	22
#8 Bobcats	0	0	0	14	14

=== Montana ===
	1	2	3	4	Total
#5 Grizzlies	0	7	7	14	28
#13 Bobcats	7	0	0	7	14

== Ranking movements ==
Ranking movements Legend: ██ Increase in ranking ██ Decrease in ranking
	Week														
Poll	Pre	1	2	3	4	5	6	7	8	9	10	11	12	13	Final
Sports Network	2	3	3	3	11	8	7	5	5	5	4	8	13	16	20
Coaches	2	3	3	2	10	7	7	5	5	5	5	10	13	18	20
