= 2013 UC Davis Aggies football team =

American college football season

2013 UC Davis Aggies football
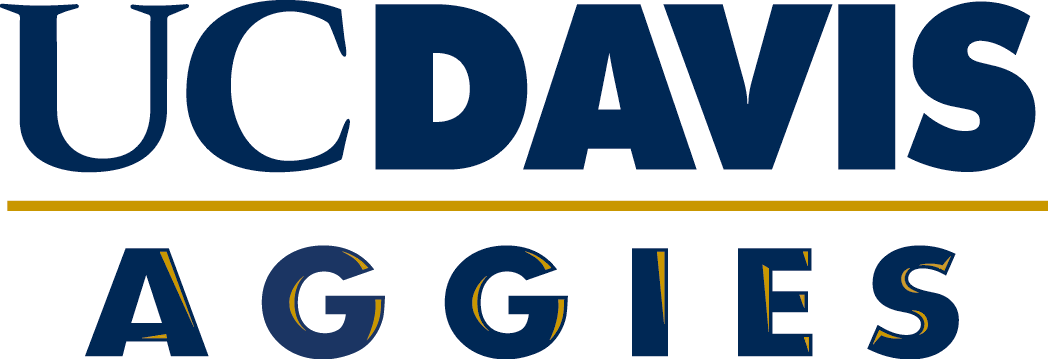
- Conference: Big Sky Conference
- Record: 5–7 (5–3 Big Sky)
- Head coach: Ron Gould (1st season)
- Offensive coordinator: Kevin Daft (2nd season)
- Defensive coordinator: Bert Watts (1st season)
- Home stadium: Aggie Stadium

2013 Big Sky Conference football standings
	Conf.			Overall
Team	W		L	W		L
No. 3 Eastern Washington $^	8	–	0	12	–	3
No. 5 Northern Arizona ^	7	–	1	9	–	3
No. 8 Montana ^	6	–	2	10	–	3
No. 21 Southern Utah ^	5	–	3	8	–	5
No. 20 Montana State	5	–	3	7	–	5
Cal Poly	5	–	3	6	–	6
UC Davis	5	–	3	5	–	7
Sacramento State	4	–	4	5	–	7
Portland State	3	–	5	6	–	6
North Dakota	2	–	6	3	–	8
Idaho State	1	–	7	3	–	9
Weber State	1	–	7	2	–	10
Northern Colorado	0	–	8	1	–	11
$ – Conference champion; ^ – FCS playoff participant; Rankings from The Sports Network poll

The 2013 UC Davis football team represented the University of California, Davis as a member of the Big Sky Conference during the 2013 NCAA Division I FCS football season. Led by first-year head coach Ron Gould, UC Davis compiled an overall record of 5–7 with a mark of 5–3 in conference play, placing in a four-way tie for fourth in the Big Sky. The Aggies played home games at Aggie Stadium in Davis, California.

== Schedule ==
UC Davis played 10 Big Sky opponents during the 2013 season, but only eight of the games counted as conference games. Games against Portland State and Northern Arizona counted as non-conference games and had no effect on the Big Sky standings.

Date	Time	Opponent	Site	TV	Result	Attendance
August 31	12:00 pm	at South Dakota*	DakotaDome; Vermillion, SD		L 7–10	8,012
September 7	6:15 pm	at Nevada*	Mackay Stadium; Reno, NV		L 7–36	27,052
September 14	6:00 pm	No. 25 Northern Arizona*	Aggie Stadium; Davis, CA	BSTV	L 10–21	4,932
September 21	6:00 pm	Portland State*	Aggie Stadium; Davis, CA	BSTV	L 10–41	5,040
September 28	6:00 pm	Idaho State	Aggie Stadium; Davis, CA	BSTV	W 30–13	7,194
October 5	12:05 pm	at Southern Utah	Eccles Coliseum; Cedar City, UT	BSTV	W 21–3	3,558
October 12	4:00 pm	No. 11 Montana^{†}	Aggie Stadium; Davis, CA	ESPN3	L 7–42	7,368
October 19	12:35 pm	at Northern Colorado	Nottingham Field; Greeley, CO	BSTV	W 34–18	4,196
October 26	1:35 pm	at No. 5 Montana State	Bobcat Stadium; Bozeman, MT	ESPN3	L 17–34	18,627
November 2	4:00 pm	Cal Poly	Aggie Stadium; Davis, CA (Battle for the Golden Horseshoe)	BSTV	L 16–34	7,768
November 16	4:00 pm	North Dakota	Aggie Stadium; Davis, CA	BSTV	W 34–18	5,688
November 23	6:30 pm	at Sacramento State	Hornet Stadium; Sacramento, CA (Causeway Classic)	BSTV	W 34–7	12,571
*Non-conference game; ^{†}Homecoming; Rankings from The Sports Network Poll released prior to the game; All times are in Pacific time

== Media ==
All UC Davis games were carried live on KHTK 1140 AM. All home games and conference road games not being shown as part of the Root Sports game of the week package were carried through the conferences online streaming service Big Sky TV.
