= 2013 Montana Grizzlies football team =

American college football season

2013 Montana Grizzlies football

FCS Playoffs Second Round vs Coastal Carolina, L 35–42
- Conference: Big Sky Conference

Ranking
- Sports Network: No. 8
- FCS Coaches: No. 8
- Record: 10–3 (6–2 Big Sky)
- Head coach: Mick Delaney (2nd season)
- Co-offensive coordinators: Scott Gragg (1st season); Kefense Hynson (1st season)
- Defensive coordinator: Ty Gregorak (2nd season)
- Home stadium: Washington–Grizzly Stadium

2013 Big Sky Conference football standings
	Conf.			Overall
Team	W		L	W		L
No. 3 Eastern Washington $^	8	–	0	12	–	3
No. 5 Northern Arizona ^	7	–	1	9	–	3
No. 8 Montana ^	6	–	2	10	–	3
No. 21 Southern Utah ^	5	–	3	8	–	5
No. 20 Montana State	5	–	3	7	–	5
Cal Poly	5	–	3	6	–	6
UC Davis	5	–	3	5	–	7
Sacramento State	4	–	4	5	–	7
Portland State	3	–	5	6	–	6
North Dakota	2	–	6	3	–	8
Idaho State	1	–	7	3	–	9
Weber State	1	–	7	2	–	10
Northern Colorado	0	–	8	1	–	11
$ – Conference champion; ^ – FCS playoff participant; Rankings from The Sports Network poll

The 2013 Montana Grizzlies football team represented the University of Montana in the 2013 NCAA Division I FCS football season. The Grizzlies were led by second-year head coach Mick Delaney and played their home games on campus at Washington–Grizzly Stadium. Montana participated as a member of the Big Sky Conference, of which they are a charter member. They finished the season 10–3, 6–2 in Big Sky play to finish in third place. They received an at-large bid to the FCS Playoffs where they lost in the second round to Coastal Carolina.

== Schedule ==
Date	Time	Opponent	Rank	Site	TV	Result	Attendance
August 31	7:00 pm	No. 12 Appalachian State*	No. 20	Washington–Grizzly Stadium; Missoula, MT	MTSN/BSTV	W 30–6	26,293
September 14	4:00 pm	at North Dakota	No. 11	Alerus Center; Grand Forks, ND	MTSN/BSTV	W 55–17	9,726
September 21	1:00 pm	Oklahoma Pandhandle State*	No. 9	Washington–Grizzly Stadium; Missoula, MT	MTSN/BSTV	W 47–14	25,014
September 28	6:00 pm	at No. 24 Northern Arizona	No. 7	Walkup Skydome; Flagstaff, AZ	RTNW	L 16–34	12,640
October 5	1:30 pm	Portland State^{†}	No. 10	Washington–Grizzly Stadium; Missoula, MT	RTNW	W 55–27	25,604
October 12	4:00 pm	at UC Davis	No. 11	Aggie Stadium; Davis, CA	MTSN/BSTV	W 42–7	7,368
October 19	1:30 pm	Cal Poly	No. 10	Washington–Grizzly Stadium; Missoula, MT	MTSN/BSTV	W 21–14 ^{OT}	25,913
October 26	1:30 pm	No. 3 Eastern Washington	No. 10	Washington–Grizzly Stadium; Missoula, MT (Governors Cup)	RTNW	L 37–42	26,082
November 2	1:00 pm	at Sacramento State	No. 12	Hornet Stadium; Sacramento, CA	MTSN/BSTV	W 51–48 ^{OT}	6,361
November 9	12:00 pm	at South Dakota*	No. 10	DakotaDome; Vermillion, SD	MTSN	W 31–27	6,567
November 16	12:00 pm	Weber State	No. 7	Washington–Grizzly Stadium; Missoula, MT	MTSN/BSTV	W 42–6	23,609
November 23	12:00 pm	at No. 13 Montana State	No. 5	Bobcat Stadium; Bozeman, MT (Brawl of the Wild)	RTNW	W 28–14	21,527
*Non-conference game; ^{†}Homecoming; Rankings from The Sports Network Poll released prior to the game

Despite also being a member of the Big Sky Conference, the game with North Dakota on September 14 is considered a non conference game and will have no effect on the Big Sky Standings.

== Game summaries ==
Final score source

=== Appalachian State ===
	1	2	3	4	Total
#12 Mountaineers	0	3	3	0	6
#20 Grizzlies	0	16	0	14	30

=== @ North Dakota ===
	1	2	3	4	Total
#11 Grizzlies	20	13	14	8	55
North Dakota	7	3	7	0	17

=== Oklahoma Panhandle State ===
	1	2	3	4	Total
Aggies	0	14	0	0	14
#9 Grizzlies	31	7	9	0	47

=== @ Northern Arizona ===
	1	2	3	4	Total
#7 Grizzlies	3	0	0	13	16
#24 Lumberjacks	14	7	7	6	34

=== Portland State ===
	1	2	3	4	Total
Vikings	13	7	0	7	27
#10 Grizzlies	21	14	10	10	55

=== @ UC Davis ===
	1	2	3	4	Total
#11 Grizzlies	14	7	7	14	42
Aggies	0	0	7	0	7

=== Cal Poly ===
	1	2	3	4	OT	Total
Mustangs	7	7	0	0	0	14
#10 Grizzlies	7	0	0	7	7	21

=== Eastern Washington ===
	1	2	3	4	Total
#3 Eagles	7	21	14	0	42
#10 Grizzlies	3	14	0	20	37

=== @ Sacramento State ===
	1	2	3	4	OT	Total
#12 Grizzlies	3	14	21	7	6	51
Hornets	3	14	7	21	3	48

=== @ South Dakota ===
	1	2	3	4	Total
#10 Grizzlies	10	7	0	14	31
Coyotes	14	10	0	3	27

=== Weber State ===
	1	2	3	4	Total
Wildcats	0	6	0	0	6
#7 Grizzlies	7	7	14	14	42

=== @ Montana State ===
	1	2	3	4	Total
#5 Grizzlies	0	7	7	14	28
#13 Bobcats	7	0	0	7	14

== FCS Playoffs ==
=== Second Round–Coastal Carolina ===
	1	2	3	4	Total
#11 Chanticleers	14	21	7	0	42
#4 Grizzlies	14	0	7	14	35

== Rankings ==
Ranking movements Legend: ██ Increase in ranking ██ Decrease in ranking
	Week														
Poll	Pre	1	2	3	4	5	6	7	8	9	10	11	12	13	Final
Sports Network	20	13	11	9	7	10	11	10	10	12	10	7	5	4	8
Coaches	22	18	15	11	7	12	10	9	10	13	12	8	6	5	8
