= 2013 Southern Utah Thunderbirds football team =

American college football season

2013 Southern Utah Thunderbirds football

FCS Playoffs First Round vs Sam Houston State, L 20–51
- Conference: Big Sky Conference

Ranking
- Sports Network: No. 21
- FCS Coaches: No. 24
- Record: 8–5 (5–3 Big Sky)
- Head coach: Ed Lamb (6th season)
- Co-offensive coordinators: Justin Walterscheid (1st season); Teag Whiting (1st season)
- Defensive coordinator: Justin Ena (4th season)
- Home stadium: Eccles Coliseum

2013 Big Sky Conference football standings
	Conf.			Overall
Team	W		L	W		L
No. 3 Eastern Washington $^	8	–	0	12	–	3
No. 5 Northern Arizona ^	7	–	1	9	–	3
No. 8 Montana ^	6	–	2	10	–	3
No. 21 Southern Utah ^	5	–	3	8	–	5
No. 20 Montana State	5	–	3	7	–	5
Cal Poly	5	–	3	6	–	6
UC Davis	5	–	3	5	–	7
Sacramento State	4	–	4	5	–	7
Portland State	3	–	5	6	–	6
North Dakota	2	–	6	3	–	8
Idaho State	1	–	7	3	–	9
Weber State	1	–	7	2	–	10
Northern Colorado	0	–	8	1	–	11
$ – Conference champion; ^ – FCS playoff participant; Rankings from The Sports Network poll

The 2013 Southern Utah Thunderbirds football team represented Southern Utah University in the 2013 NCAA Division I FCS football season. They were led by sixth year head coach Ed Lamb and played their home games at Eccles Coliseum. This was their second year as a member of the Big Sky Conference. They finished the season 8–5, 5–3 in Big Sky play to finish in a four way tie for fourth place. They received an at-large bid to the FCS Playoffs where they lost in the first round to Sam Houston State.

== Schedule ==
The 2013 schedule was the first 12-game schedule in Thunderbirds history. Even though the Thunderbirds played 9 conference opponents, only 8 of the games counted as conference games. The series with Sacramento State was scheduled before Southern Utah became a member of the Big Sky and did not count as a conference game for either team.

Date	Time	Opponent	Rank	Site	TV	Result	Attendance
August 29	5:30 pm	at South Alabama*		Ladd–Peebles Stadium; Mobile, AL	ESPN3	W 22–21	15,240
September 7	6:05 pm	Fort Lewis*		Eccles Coliseum; Cedar City, UT	BSTV	W 49–0	5,872
September 14	4:30 pm	at Washington State*		Martin Stadium; Pullman, WA	P12N	L 10–48	31,127
September 21	7:05 pm	at Sacramento State*		Hornet Stadium; Sacramento, CA	BSTV	W 24–21 ^{OT}	5,612
September 28	1:35 pm	at Northern Colorado		Nottingham Field; Greeley, CO	BSTV	W 27–21	4,361
October 5	1:05 pm	UC Davis		Eccles Coliseum; Cedar City, UT	BSTV	L 3–21	3,558
October 12	2:05 pm	Portland State^{†}		Eccles Coliseum; Cedar City, UT	BSTV	W 17–7	6,539
October 19	6:05 pm	at No. 4 Eastern Washington		Roos Field; Cheney, WA	BSTV	L 10–34	10,135
October 26	1:05 pm	Idaho State		Eccles Coliseum; Cedar City, UT	BSTV	W 19–9	3,342
November 9	1:00 pm	at Weber State		Stewart Stadium; Ogden, UT	BSTV	W 27–21	4,978
November 16	4:00 pm	at No. 8 Montana State		Bobcat Stadium; Bozeman, MT	ESPN3	W 22–14	18,187
November 23	1:05 pm	No. 10 Northern Arizona	No. 20	Eccles Coliseum; Cedar City, UT (Grand Canyon Rivalry)	BSTV	L 10–20	2,521
November 30	1:00 pm	at No. 14 Sam Houston State	No. 22	Bowers Stadium; Huntsville, TX (NCAA Division I First Round)	ESPN3	L 20–51	4,069
*Non-conference game; ^{†}Homecoming; Rankings from The Sports Network Poll released prior to the game; All times are in Mountain time

== Game summaries ==
=== South Alabama ===
Southern Utah at South Alabama

Team	1	2	3	4	Total
• Thunderbirds	10	0	3	9	22
Jaguars	0	7	7	7	21

- Date: August 29
- Location: Ladd–Peebles Stadium
  Mobile, AL
- Game start: 6:30 PM CST
- Elapsed time: 3:12
- Game attendance: 15,240
- Game weather: 87 °F (31 °C), Sunny, winds S at 9mph
- Referee: Steve Marlowe
- TV announcers (ESPN3): Shawn Kenney and Cole Cubelic

Scoring summary
1	5:52	Southern Utah	Colton Cook 33-yard field goal	3–0
1	1:16	Southern Utah	Raysean Martin 1-yard run (Colton Cook kick)	10–0
2	4:37	South Alabama	Brandon Bridge 40-yard run (Aleem Sunanon kick)	10–7
3	11:15	Southern Utah	Colton Cook 37-yard field goal	13–7
3	7:38	South Alabama	Jereme Jones 6-yard pass from Ross Metheny (Aleem Sunanon kick)	13–14
4	14:47	South Alabama	Danny Woodson 20-yard pass from Ross Metheny (Aleem Sunanon kick)	13–21
4	6:13	Southern Utah	Anthony Norris 2-yard pass from Aaron Cantu (two-point conversion failed)	19–21
4	0:00	Southern Utah	Colton Cook 28-yard field goal	22–21

=== Ft. Lewis ===
Ft. Lewis at Southern Utah

Team	1	2	3	4	Total
Skyhawks	0	0	0	0	0
• Thunderbirds	21	21	7	0	49

- Date: September 7
- Location: Eccles Coliseum
  Cedar City, UT
- Game start: 6:05 PM MST
- Elapsed time: 3:24
- Game attendance: 5,872
- Game weather: 73 °F (23 °C), Cloudy, winds SW at 6mph
- Referee: Bruce Palmer
- TV announcers (Big Sky TV): Art Challis and Matt Roan

Scoring summary
1	8:38	Southern Utah	Toa Afatasi 4-yard pass from Aaron Cantu (Colton Cook kick)	7–0
1	4:13	Southern Utah	Matt Holley 19-yard fumble return (Colton Cook kick)	14–0
1	0:00	Southern Utah	Miles Killebrew 89-yard fumble return (Colton Cook kick)	21–0
2	6:22	Southern Utah	Anthony Norris 8-yard pass from Aaron Cantu (Colton Cook kick)	28–0
2	6:07	Southern Utah	Anthony Norris 19-yard pass from Aaron Cantu (Colton Cook kick)	35–0
2	2:54	Southern Utah	Easton Pederson 6-yard pass from Aaron Cantu (Colton Cook kick)	42–0
3	9:56	Southern Utah	Malik Brown 5-yard run (Colton Cook kick)	49–0

=== Washington State ===
Southern Utah at Washington State

Team	1	2	3	4	Total
Thunderbirds	3	7	0	0	10
• Cougars	14	14	13	7	48

- Date: September 14
- Location: Martin Stadium
  Pullman, WA
- Game start: 3:37 PM PST
- Elapsed time: 3:11
- Game attendance: 31,127
- Game weather: 91 °F (33 °C), Thin & Whispy Clouds, winds E at 12mph
- Referee: Mark Duddy
- TV announcers (Pac-12): JB Long & Jeremy Bloom

Scoring summary
1	13:03	Washington State	Dom Williams 43-yard pass from Connor Halliday (Andrew Fuerney kick)	0–7
1	6:02	Southern Utah	Colton Cook 40-yard field goal	3–7
1	3:56	Washington State	Isiah Myers 10-yard pass from Connor Halliday (Andrew Fuerney kick)	3–14
2	10:55	Southern Utah	Raysean Martin 3-yard run (Colton Cook kick good)	10–14
2	4:22	Washington State	Dom Williams 55-yard pass from Connor Halliday (Andrew Fuerney kick)	10–21
2	0:38	Washington State	Damante Horton 72-yard interception return (Andrew Fuerney kick)	10–28
3	8:38	Washington State	Andrew Fuerney 46-yard field goal	10–31
3	4:20	Washington State	Andrew Fuerney 30-yard field goal	10–34
3	2:53	Washington State	Gabe Marks 1-yard pass from Connor Halliday (Andrew Fuerney kick)	10–41
4	11:07	Washington State	Vince Mayle 3-yard pass from Connor Halliday (Andrew Fuerney kick)	10–48

=== Sacramento State ===
Southern Utah at Sacramento State

Team	1	2	3	4	OT	Total
• Thunderbirds	0	13	0	8	3	24
Hornets	7	14	0	0	0	21

- Date: September 21
- Location: Hornet Stadium
  Sacramento, CA
- Game start: 6:05 PM PST
- Elapsed time: 2:51
- Game attendance: 5,612
- Game weather: 65 °F (18 °C), Overcast & Wet, winds at 6mph
- Referee: Gregg Wilson
- TV announcers (Big Sky TV): Jason Ross, Steve McElroy & Danny Sullivan

Scoring summary
1	8:38	Sacramento State	Morris Norrise 33-yard pass from Garrett Safron (Jesse Aguilar kick)	0–7
2	13:32	Southern Utah	Raysean Martin 1-yard run (Colton Cook kick blocked)	6–7
2	10:53	Sacramento State	DeAndre Carter 20-yard pass from Garrett Safron (Jesse Aguilar kick)	6–14
2	7:14	Southern Utah	Raysean Martin 2-yard run (Colton Cook kick)	13–14
2	3:45	Sacramento State	Ezekiel Graham 11-yard run (Jesse Aguilar kick)	13–21
4	0:31	Southern Utah	Raysean Martin 1-yard run (Aaron Cantu pass to Griff McNabb for two-point conversion)	Tied 21–21
OT	0:00	Southern Utah	Colton Cook 38-yard field goal	24–21

=== Northern Colorado ===
Southern Utah at Northern Colorado

Team	1	2	3	4	Total
• Thunderbirds	3	14	7	3	27
Bears	0	7	7	7	21

- Date: September 28
- Location: Nottingham Field
  Greeley, CO
- Television network: Big Sky TV

Scoring summary
1	2:47	Southern Utah	Colton Cook 48-yard field goal	3–0
2	10:37	Northern Colorado	Jace Davis 19-yard pass from Tim Tancik (Jamie Falloon kick)	3–7
2	1:02	Southern Utah	Levi Teo 1-yard run (Colton Cook kick)	10–7
2	0:15	Southern Utah	Griff McNabb 12-yard pass from Aaron Cantu (Colton Cook kick)	17–7
3	11:43	Northern Colorado	Tim Tancik 1-yard run (Jamie Falloon kick)	17–14
3	6:26	Southern Utah	Easton Pederson 17-yard pass from Aaron Cantu (Colton Cook kick)	24–14
4	6:08	Southern Utah	Colton Cook 36-yard field goal	27–14
4	0:58	Northern Colorado	Dimitri Stimphil 5-yard pass from Tim Tancik (Jamie Falloon kick)	27–21

=== UC Davis ===
UC Davis at Southern Utah

Team	1	2	3	4	Total
• Aggies	0	14	7	0	21
Thunderbirds	3	0	0	0	3

- Date: October 5
- Location: Eccles Coliseum
  Cedar City, UT
- TV announcers (Big Sky TV): Art Challis and Matt Roan

Scoring summary
1	5:36	Southern Utah	Colton Cook 30-yard field goal	3–0
2	11:01	UC Davis	Gabe Manzanares 16-yard run (Brady Stuart kick)	3–7
2	4:27	UC Davis	Gabe Manzanares 1-yard run (Brady Stuart kick)	3–14
3	9:11	UC Davis	TJ King 19-yard pass from Randy Wright (Brady Stuart kick)	3–21

=== Portland State ===
Portland State at Southern Utah

Team	1	2	3	4	Total
Vikings	0	7	0	0	7
• Thunderbirds	0	10	0	7	17

- Date: October 12
- Location: Eccles Coliseum
  Cedar City, UT
- TV announcers (Big Sky TV): Art Challis and Matt Roan

Scoring summary
2	13:08	Southern Utah	Colton Cook 48-yard field goal	3–0
2	5:15	Southern Utah	Fatu Moala 5-yard pass from Aaron Cantu (Colton Cook kick)	10–0
2	0:01	Portland State	Paris Penn 4-yard run (Nick Fernandez kick)	10–7
4	6:01	Southern Utah	Aaron Cantu 1-yard run (Colton Cook kick)	17–7

=== Eastern Washington ===
Southern Utah at Eastern Washington

Team	1	2	3	4	Total
Thunderbirds	0	3	0	7	10
• #4 Eagles	14	0	13	7	34

- Date: October 19
- Location: Roos Field
  Cheney, WA
- Television network: Big Sky TV

Scoring summary
1	8:02	Eastern Washington	Samson Ebukam 21-yard interception return (Kevin Miller kick)	0–7
1	2:01	Eastern Washington	Ashton Clark 12-yard pass from Vernon Adams (Kevin Miller kick)	0–14
2	0:12	Southern Utah	Colton Cook 34-yard field goal	3–14
3	5:33	Eastern Washington	Kendrick Bourne 31-yard pass from Vernon Adams (Kevin Miller kick)	3–21
3	2:43	Eastern Washington	Cooper Kupp 52-yard pass from Vernon Adams (Kevin Miller kick missed)	3–27
4	13:18	Eastern Washington	Mario Brown 11-yard run (Kevin Miller kick)	3–34
4	0:45	Southern Utah	C.J. Morgan 29-yard pass from Mike Sharp (Colton Cook kick good)	10–34

=== Idaho State ===
Idaho State at Southern Utah

Team	1	2	3	4	Total
Bengals	0	6	0	3	9
• Thunderbirds	3	10	0	6	19

- Date: October 26
- Location: Eccles Coliseum
  Cedar City, UT
- TV announcers (Big Sky TV): Art Challis and Matt Roan

Scoring summary
1	6:16	Southern Utah	Colton Cook 38-yard field goal	3–0
2	12:15	Southern Utah	Mike Sharp 1-yard run (Colton Cook kick)	10–0
2	6:37	Southern Utah	Colton Cook 30-yard field goal	13–0
2	4:27	Idaho State	Cameron Richard 4-yard pass from Justin Arias (Brendon Gracias kick missed)	13–6
4	10:53	Southern Utah	Colton Cook 38-yard field goal	16–6
4	5:27	Idaho State	Brendon Gracias 34-yard field goal	16–9
4	0:27	Southern Utah	Colton Cook 22-yard field goal	19–9

=== Weber State ===
Southern Utah at Weber State

Team	1	2	3	4	Total
• Thunderbirds	0	7	10	10	27
Wildcats	7	0	0	14	21

- Date: November 9
- Location: Stewart Stadium
  Ogden, UT
- TV announcers (Big Sky TV): Carl Arky and Ty Sparrow

Scoring summary
1	5:39	Weber State	Cameron Livingston 31-yard pass from Austin Chipoletti (Shaun McClain kick)	0–7
2	0:22	Southern Utah	Levi Te'o 1-yard run (Colton Cook kick)	Tied 7–7
3	9:22	Southern Utah	Mike Sharp 1-yard run (Colton Cook kick)	14-7
3	2:00	Southern Utah	Colton Cook 23 yard field goal	17–7
4	6:27	Southern Utah	Griff McNabb 12-yard pass from Aaron Cantu (Colton Cook kick)	24–7
4	5:16	Weber State	Gamal Fowler 22-yard pass from Austin Chipoletti (Shaun McClain kick)	24–14
4	1:32	Southern Utah	Colton Cook 36-yard field goal	27–14
4	0:02	Weber State	Cameron Livingston 7-yard pass from Austin Chipoletti (Shaun McClain kick)	27–21

=== Montana State ===
Southern Utah at Montana State

Team	1	2	3	4	Total
• Thunderbirds	3	6	6	7	22
#8 Bobcats	0	0	0	14	14

- Date: November 16
- Location: Bobcat Stadium
  Bozeman, MT
- Game start: 4:07 PM MST
- Elapsed time: 2:45
- Game attendance: 18,187
- Game weather: 29F • Wind: WSW 5-20 • Weather: snow flurries, wind
- Referee: Kelly Holman
- Television network: Big Sky TV

Scoring summary
1	4:18	Southern Utah	Colton Cook 29-yard field goal	3–0
2	0:48	Southern Utah	Chris Robison 5-yard run (Colton Cook kick missed)	9–0
3	9:12	Southern Utah	Aaron Cantu 1-yard run (two-point conversion failed)	15–0
4	9:18	Montana State	Chad Newell 13-yard run (Rory Perez kick)	15–7
4	5:11	Southern Utah	Aaron Cantu 1-yard run (Colton Cook kick)	22–7
4	2:47	Montana State	DeNarius McGhee 1-yard run (Rory Perez kick)	22–14

=== Northern Arizona ===
Northern Arizona at Southern Utah

Team	1	2	3	4	Total
• Lumberjacks	0	0	3	17	20
#20 Thunderbirds	0	7	3	0	10

- Date: November 23
- Location: Eccles Coliseum
  Cedar City, UT
- Game start: 1:05 PM MST
- Elapsed time: 2:40
- Game attendance: 2,521
- Game weather: 36F • Wind: N@5mph • Light snow
- TV announcers (Big Sky TV): Art Challis and Matt Roan

Scoring summary
1	2:22	Southern Utah	Raysean Martin 4-yard run (Colton Cook kick)	7–0
3	8:15	Southern Utah	Colton Cook 32-yard field goal	10–0
3	4:11	Northern Arizona	Andy Wilder 29-yard field goal	10–3
4	8:40	Northern Arizona	Nick Cole 25-yard pass from Kyren Poe (Andy Wilder kick)	Tied 10–10
4	5:43	Northern Arizona	Andy Wilder 20-yard field goal	10–13
4	0:10	Northern Arizona	Blair Wishom 52-yard interception return (Andy Wilder kick)	10–20

== FCS Playoffs ==
=== At Sam Houston State (FCS Playoffs First Round) ===
#22 Southern Utah at #14 Sam Houston State

Team	1	2	3	4	Total
#22 Thunderbirds	10	0	10	0	20
• #14 Bearkats	7	16	7	21	51

- Date: November 30
- Location: Bowers Stadium
  Huntsville, TX
- Game start: 1:00 PM MST
- Television network: ESPN3

Scoring summary
1	5:19	Southern Utah	Colton Cook 42-yard field goal	3–0
1	3:36	Southern Utah	Anthony Norris 38-yard pass from Aaron Cantu (Colton Cook kick)	10–0
1	1:31	Sam Houston State	Chance Nelson 32-yard pass from Brian Bell (Luc Swimberghe kick)	10–7
2	11:02	Sam Houston State	Keshawn Hill 3-yard run (two-point conversion failed)	10–13
2	0:59	Sam Houston State	Brian Bell 1-yard run (Luc Swimberghe kick)	10–20
2	0:00	Sam Houston State	Luc Swimberghe 24-yard field goal	10–23
3	8:38	Sam Houston State	Ragan Henderson 7-yard pass from Brian Bell (Luc Swimberghe kick)	10–30
3	5:26	Southern Utah	Colton Cook 38-yard field goal	13–30
3	4:46	Southern Utah	Robert Torgerson 39-yard fumble return (Colton Cook kick)	20–30
4	14:57	Sam Houston State	Timothy Flanders 2-yard run (Luc Swimberghe kick)	20–37
4	7:57	Sam Houston State	Timothy Flanders 1-yard run (Luc Swimberghe kick)	20–44
4	5:10	Sam Houston State	Keshawn Hill 2-yard run (Luc Swimberghe kick)	20–51

== Media ==
All Thunderbirds football games were broadcast live on KSUU. They were streamed online at power91radio. All conference road games and all home games not on Root were streamed via Big Sky TV.
