= 2013 Idaho State Bengals football team =

American college football season

2013 Idaho State Bengals football
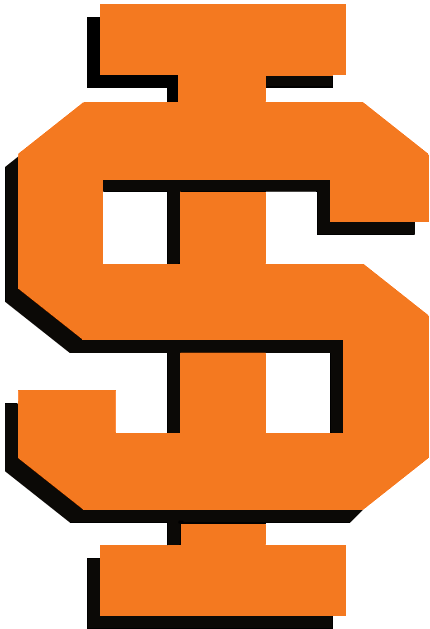
- Conference: Big Sky Conference
- Record: 3–9 (1–7 Big Sky)
- Head coach: Mike Kramer (3rd season)
- Offensive coordinator: Don Bailey (3rd season)
- Co-defensive coordinators: Roger Cooper (2nd season); Spencer Toone (2nd season)
- Home stadium: Holt Arena

2013 Big Sky Conference football standings
| | Conf. | | | Overall |
| Team | W | | L | W | | L |
|---|---|---|---|---|---|---|
| No. 3 Eastern Washington $^ | 8 | – | 0 | 12 | – | 3 |
| No. 5 Northern Arizona ^ | 7 | – | 1 | 9 | – | 3 |
| No. 8 Montana ^ | 6 | – | 2 | 10 | – | 3 |
| No. 21 Southern Utah ^ | 5 | – | 3 | 8 | – | 5 |
| No. 20 Montana State | 5 | – | 3 | 7 | – | 5 |
| Cal Poly | 5 | – | 3 | 6 | – | 6 |
| UC Davis | 5 | – | 3 | 5 | – | 7 |
| Sacramento State | 4 | – | 4 | 5 | – | 7 |
| Portland State | 3 | – | 5 | 6 | – | 6 |
| North Dakota | 2 | – | 6 | 3 | – | 8 |
| Idaho State | 1 | – | 7 | 3 | – | 9 |
| Weber State | 1 | – | 7 | 2 | – | 10 |
| Northern Colorado | 0 | – | 8 | 1 | – | 11 |
$ – Conference champion; ^ – FCS playoff participant; Rankings from The Sports Network poll

The 2013 Idaho State Bengals football team represented Idaho State University as a member of the Big Sky Conference during the 2013 NCAA Division I FCS football season. Led by third-year head coach Mike Kramer, the Bengals compiled an overall record of 3–9 with a mark of 1–7 in conference play, tying for 11th place in the Big Sky. Idaho State played their home games at Holt Arena in Pocatello, Idaho.

== Schedule ==
| Date | Time | Opponent | Site | TV | Result | Attendance | Source |
|---|---|---|---|---|---|---|---|
| September 7 | 3:00 pm | Dixie State* | Holt Arena; Pocatello, ID | BSTV | W 40–14 | 5,585 | |
| September 14 | 3:00 pm | Western State (CO)* | Holt Arena; Pocatello, ID | BSTV | W 29–3 | 4,562 | |
| September 21 | 1:00 pm | at No. 17 (FBS) Washington* | Husky Stadium; Seattle, WA | P12N | L 0–56 | 67,093 | |
| September 28 | 7:00 pm | at UC Davis | Aggie Stadium; Davis, CA | BSTV | L 13–30 | 7,194 | |
| October 5 | 2:00 pm | North Dakota^{†} | Holt Arena; Pocatello, ID | BSTV | L 25–28 | 7,568 | |
| October 12 | 3:00 pm | Northern Colorado | Holt Arena; Pocatello, ID | BSTV | W 40–26 | 4,574 | |
| October 19 | 5:00 pm | at No. 19 Northern Arizona | Walkup Skydome; Flagstaff, AZ | NAU-TV/BSTV | L 30–39 | 8,242 | |
| October 26 | 1:00 pm | at Southern Utah | Eccles Coliseum; Cedar City, UT | BSTV | L 9–19 | 3,342 | |
| November 2 | 3:00 pm | No. 3 Eastern Washington | Holt Arena; Pocatello, ID | BSTV | L 34–55 | 4,984 | |
| November 9 | 3:00 pm | Portland State | Holt Arena; Pocatello, ID | BSTV | L 31–38 | 4,926 | |
| November 16 | 1:00 pm | at BYU* | LaVell Edwards Stadium; Provo, UT | BYUtv | L 13–59 | 58,645 | |
| November 23 | 1:00 pm | at Weber State | Stewart Stadium; Ogden, UT | BSTV | L 7–32 | 5,396 | |
*Non-conference game; ^{†}Homecoming; Rankings from The Sports Network Poll released prior to the game; All times are in Mountain time

== Game summaries ==
=== Dixie State ===
| | 1 | 2 | 3 | 4 | Total |
|---|---|---|---|---|---|
| Red Storm | 7 | 0 | 7 | 0 | 14 |
| Bengals | 10 | 14 | 10 | 6 | 40 |

=== Western State ===
| | 1 | 2 | 3 | 4 | Total |
|---|---|---|---|---|---|
| Mountaineers | 0 | 3 | 0 | 0 | 3 |
| Bengals | 3 | 10 | 13 | 3 | 29 |

=== @ Washington ===
| | 1 | 2 | 3 | 4 | Total |
|---|---|---|---|---|---|
| Bengals | 0 | 0 | 0 | 0 | 0 |
| #17 (FBS) Huskies | 21 | 21 | 7 | 7 | 56 |

=== @ UC Davis ===
| | 1 | 2 | 3 | 4 | Total |
|---|---|---|---|---|---|
| Bengals | 0 | 0 | 0 | 13 | 13 |
| Aggies | 10 | 6 | 0 | 14 | 30 |

=== North Dakota ===
| | 1 | 2 | 3 | 4 | Total |
|---|---|---|---|---|---|
| North Dakota | 0 | 14 | 7 | 7 | 28 |
| Bengals | 0 | 7 | 3 | 15 | 25 |

=== Northern Colorado ===
| | 1 | 2 | 3 | 4 | Total |
|---|---|---|---|---|---|
| Bears | 0 | 16 | 7 | 3 | 26 |
| Bengals | 7 | 20 | 10 | 3 | 40 |

=== @ Northern Arizona ===
| | 1 | 2 | 3 | 4 | Total |
|---|---|---|---|---|---|
| Bengals | 7 | 7 | 0 | 16 | 30 |
| #19 Lumberjacks | 6 | 6 | 20 | 7 | 39 |

=== @ Southern Utah ===
| | 1 | 2 | 3 | 4 | Total |
|---|---|---|---|---|---|
| Bengals | 0 | 6 | 0 | 3 | 9 |
| Thunderbirds | 3 | 10 | 0 | 6 | 19 |

=== Eastern Washington ===
| | 1 | 2 | 3 | 4 | Total |
|---|---|---|---|---|---|
| #3 Eagles | 10 | 21 | 17 | 7 | 55 |
| Bengals | 10 | 14 | 3 | 7 | 34 |

=== Portland State ===
| | 1 | 2 | 3 | 4 | Total |
|---|---|---|---|---|---|
| Vikings | 21 | 7 | 10 | 0 | 38 |
| Bengals | 7 | 14 | 7 | 3 | 31 |

=== @ BYU ===
| | 1 | 2 | 3 | 4 | Total |
|---|---|---|---|---|---|
| Bengals | 3 | 0 | 7 | 3 | 13 |
| Cougars | 14 | 35 | 10 | 0 | 59 |

=== Weber State ===
| | 1 | 2 | 3 | 4 | Total |
|---|---|---|---|---|---|
| Bengals | 7 | 0 | 0 | 0 | 7 |
| Wildcats | 13 | 7 | 0 | 12 | 32 |
