= 2013 Weber State Wildcats football team =

American college football season

2013 Weber State Wildcats football
- Conference: Big Sky Conference
- Record: 2–10 (1–7 Big Sky)
- Head coach: Jody Sears (2nd season)
- Offensive coordinator: Robin Pflugrad (1st season)
- Defensive coordinator: Eric Lewis (1st season)
- Home stadium: Stewart Stadium

2013 Big Sky Conference football standings
	Conf.			Overall
Team	W		L	W		L
No. 3 Eastern Washington $^	8	–	0	12	–	3
No. 5 Northern Arizona ^	7	–	1	9	–	3
No. 8 Montana ^	6	–	2	10	–	3
No. 21 Southern Utah ^	5	–	3	8	–	5
No. 20 Montana State	5	–	3	7	–	5
Cal Poly	5	–	3	6	–	6
UC Davis	5	–	3	5	–	7
Sacramento State	4	–	4	5	–	7
Portland State	3	–	5	6	–	6
North Dakota	2	–	6	3	–	8
Idaho State	1	–	7	3	–	9
Weber State	1	–	7	2	–	10
Northern Colorado	0	–	8	1	–	11
$ – Conference champion; ^ – FCS playoff participant; Rankings from The Sports Network poll

The 2013 Weber State Wildcats football team represented Weber State University in the 2013 NCAA Division I FCS football season. Jody Sears returned as the head coach for the 2013 season, after being the interim head coach during 2012, and will be working with a new offensive coordinator and defensive coordinator in Robin Pflugrad and Eric Lewis. Weber State played their home games at Stewart Stadium. They were a member of the Big Sky Conference. They finished the season 2–10, 1–7 in Big Sky play to finish in a tie for 11th place.

On November 26, head coach Jody Sears was fired after a two-season record of 4–19. It was part of Sears' three-year contract, signed after his first year as interim head coach, that he could be fired without compensation if the Wildcats failed to win four games in a season.

== Roster ==
2013 Weber State Wildcats football team roster
Players			Coaches
Offense: Pos. / # / Name / Class; QB / 17 / Jadrian Clark / Fr	Defense: Pos. / # / Name / Class	Special teams: Pos. / # / Name / Class	Head coach: Jody Sears (Washington State); Coordinators/assistant coaches: Robin Pflugrad (Portland State) Offensive coordinator; Eric Lewis (San Diego State) Defensive coordinator; Steve Morton (Washington State) Assistant head coach, offensive line; Jason Belford (Washington State) Defensive line; Justin Rascati (James Madison) Quarterbacks; Ryan Smaha (Eastern Oregon) Special teams; Ted Stanley (Utah) Tight ends; Craig Stutzmann (Hawaiʻi) Wide receivers; Colton Swan (Weber State) Linebackers; Legend: (C) Team captain; (S) Suspended; (I) Ineligible; Injured; Redshirt; Roster; Last update: September 9, 2013

== Media ==
All Wildcats games can be heard on KLO (Ogden) and KLO-FM (Salt Lake City), nicknamed KLO AM/FM. KLO is a move from the previous radio broadcast group of 1280 AM, but radio broadcasts will still be done online via Big Sky TV for non-televised home games and on KLOradio.com for all games. Carl Arky and Ty Sparrow will call every game.

== Schedule ==
Date	Time	Opponent	Site	TV	Result	Attendance
August 31	6:00 pm	Stephen F. Austin*	Stewart Stadium; Ogden, UT	BSTV	W 50–40	6,181
September 7	12:00 pm	at Utah*	Rice-Eccles Stadium; Salt Lake City, UT	P12N	L 7–70	45,053
September 14	6:00 pm	at Utah State*	Romney Stadium; Logan, UT	ESPN3	L 6–70	25,513
September 21	6:00 pm	at No. 12 McNeese State*	Cowboy Stadium; Lake Charles, LA		L 6–43	8,893
September 28	6:00 pm	Sacramento State^{†}	Stewart Stadium; Ogden, UT	BSTV	L 3–31	6,610
October 5	5:00 pm	at No. 6 Eastern Washington	Roos Field; Cheney, WA	BSTV	L 19–41	9,734
October 12	7:00 pm	at Cal Poly	Alex G. Spanos Stadium; San Luis Obispo, CA	BSTV	L 0–47	5,824
October 19	5:00 pm	No. 5 Montana State	Stewart Stadium; Ogden, UT	RTUT	L 16–34	5,616
November 2	2:00 pm	at Portland State	Jeld-Wen Field; Portland, OR	BSTV	L 24–45	4,285
November 9	1:00 pm	Southern Utah	Stewart Stadium; Ogden, UT	BSTV	L 21–27	4,978
November 16	12:00 pm	at No. 7 Montana	Washington–Grizzly Stadium; Missoula, MT	ESPN3	L 6–42	23,609
November 23	1:00 pm	Idaho State	Stewart Stadium; Ogden, UT	BSTV	W 32–7	5,396
*Non-conference game; ^{†}Homecoming; Rankings from The Sports Network Poll released prior to the game; All times are in Mountain time

== Game summaries ==
=== Stephen F. Austin ===
Stephen F. Austin at Weber State

Team	1	2	3	4	Total
Lumberjacks	7	3	17	13	40
• Wildcats	23	0	20	7	50

- Date: August 31
- Location: Stewart Stadium
  Ogden, UT
- Game start: 6:05 PM MST
- Elapsed time: 3:30
- Game attendance: 6,181
- Game weather: 86 °F (30 °C), Sunny, winds calm
- Referee: Jim Crowley
- TV announcers (Big Sky TV): Carl Arky and Ty Sparrow

Scoring summary
1	13:21	WSU	Erik Walker 39-yard touchdown run, Jordan Adamcyzk pass to Cordero Dixon for a 2-point conversion	WSU 8–0
1	9:35	WSU	DJ Walker 70-yard interception returned for a touchdown, Kela Marciel rush for a 2-point conversion	WSU 16–0
1	5:17	SFA	JDJ Ward 36-yard touchdown pass from Brady Attaway, Fred Ford kick good	WSU 16–7
1	5:03	WSU	Bo Bolen 100-yard kickoff return for a touchdown, Carson Fackrell kick good	WSU 23–7
2	0:18	SFA	Jordan Wiggins 22-yard Field Goal	WSU 23–10
3	14:35	SFA	Mike Brooks 14-yard touchdown pass from Brady Attaway, Jordan Wiggs kick good	WSU 23–17
3	13:11	WSU	Erik Walker 27-yard touchdown pass from Jordan Adamczyk, Carson fackrell kick good	WSU 30–17
3	11:37	SFA	Aaron Thomas 34-yard touchdown pass from Brady Attaway, Jordan Wiggs kick good	WSU 30–24
3	8:19	WSU	Bo Bolen 1-yard touchdown rush, conversion failed	WSU 36–24
3	5:19	SFA	Jordan Wiggs 40-yard Field Goal	WSU 36–27
3	0:52	WSU	Bo Bolen 19-yard touchdown rush, Carson Fackrell kick good	WSU 43–27
4	13:53	SFA	Mike Brooks 21-yard touchdown pass from Brady Attaway, Jordan Wiggs kick good	WSU 43–34
4	11:42	SFA	Gus Johnson 2-yard touchdown rush, kick failed	WSU 43–40
4	10:25	WSU	Zach Smith 57-yard touchdown rush, Carson Fackrell kick good	WSU 50–40

=== Utah ===
Weber State at Utah

Team	1	2	3	4	Total
Wildcats	0	0	7	0	7
• Utes	14	35	14	7	70

- Date: September 7
- Location: Rice-Eccles Stadium
  Salt Lake City, UT
- Game start: 12:07 PM MST
- Elapsed time: 3:06
- Game attendance: 45,053
- Game weather: 79 °F (26 °C), Partly Cloudy, winds WNW @ 8mph
- Referee: Land Clark
- TV announcers (Pac-12): Matt McConnell and Jamal Anderson

Scoring summary
1	9:07	UTAH	Travis Wilson 38-yard touchdown run, Andy Phillips kick good	UTAH 7–0
1	5:13	UTAH	Sean Fitzgerald 80-yard touchdown pass from Travis Wilson, Andy Phillips kick good	UTAH 14–0
2	9:59	UTAH	Kelvin York 24-yard touchdown run, Andy Phillips kick good	UTAH 21–0
2	5:50	UTAH	Dres Anderson 57-yard touchdown pass from Travis Wilson, Andy Phillips kick good	UTAH 28–0
2	3:08	UTAH	Travis Wilson 51-yard touchdown run, Andy Phillips kick good	UTAH 35–0
2	2:57	UTAH	Mike Honeycutt 21-yard fumble return for a touchdown, Andy Phillips kick good	UTAH 42–0
2	0:04	UTAH	Sean Fitzgerald 1-yard touchdown pass from Travis Wilson, Andy Phillips kick good	UTAH 49–0
3	12:31	UTAH	Lucky Radley 17-yard touchdown run, Andy Phillips kick good	UTAH 56–0
3	7:17	WSU	Josh Booker 3-yard touchdown run, Carson Fackrell kick good	UTAH 56–7
3	3:47	UTAH	Lucky Radley 11-yard touchdown run, Andy Phillips kick good	UTAH 63–7
4	1:43	UTAH	Marcus Williams 1-yard touchdown run, Andy Phillips kick good	UTAH 70–7

=== Utah State ===
Weber State at Utah State

Team	1	2	3	4	Total
Wildcats	0	0	0	6	6
• Aggies	21	28	21	0	70

- Date: September 14
- Location: Romney Stadium
  Logan, UT
- Game start: 6:04 MST
- Elapsed time: 3:05
- Game attendance: 25,513
- Game weather: Warm and Muggy
- Referee: Eddy Shelton
- TV announcers (ESPN3): Joel Meyers & Kevin O'Connell

Scoring summary
1	10:41	USU	D.J. Tialavea 5-yard touchdown pass from Chuckie Keeton, Nick Diaz kick good	USU 7–0
1	6:38	USU	Joey De'Martino 11-yard touchdown run, Nick Diaz kick good	USU 14–0
1	3:52	USU	Travis Reynolds 39-yard touchdown pass from Chuckie Keeton, Nick Diaz kick good	USU 21–0
2	14:53	USU	Kyler fackrell 4-yard touchdown pass from Chuckie Keeton, Nick Diaz kick good	USU 28–0
2	11:26	USU	Ronald Butler 15-yard touchdown pass from Chuckie Keeton, Nick Diaz kick good	USU 35–0
2	6:30	USU	Joey De'Martino 7-yard touchdown run, Nick Diaz kick good	USU 42–0
2	3:47	UTAH	D.J. Tialavea 8-yard touchdown pass from Chuckie Keeton, Nick Diaz kick good	USU 49–0
3	11:48	USU	Joey De'Martino 60-yard touchdown run, Nick Diaz kick good	USU 56–0
3	10:13	USU	Keega Andersen 56-yard touchdown pass from Craig Harrison, Josh Thompson kick good	USU 63–0
3	9:59	USU	Robert Marshall 2-yard touchdown run, Josh Thompson kick good	USU 70–0
4	0:50	WSU	Spencer Unga 38-yard fumble recovery returned for a touchdown, Carson Fackrell kick blocked	USU 70–6

=== McNeese State ===
Weber State at McNeese State

Team	1	2	3	4	Total
Wildcats	6	0	0	0	6
• #12 Cowboys	7	10	13	13	43

- Date: September 21
- Location: Cowboy Stadium
  Lake Charles, LA
- Game start: 7:00 PM CST
- Elapsed time: 2:53
- Game attendance: 8,893
- Game weather: 73 °F (23 °C), Cloudy w/ 70% chance of rain, Winds NNE @ 12mph
- Referee: C. Castleberry

Scoring summary
1	9:41	WSU	Cam Livingston 48-yard touchdown pass from Austin Chipoletti, Austin Chipoletti rush failed	WSU 6–0
1	2:55	MCN	Wallace Scott 69-yard Interception returned for a touchdown, Ryan Rome kick good	MCN 7–6
2	14:45	MCN	Kelvin Bennett 48-yard touchdown run, Ryan Rome kick good	MCN 14–6
2	5:40	MCN	Ryan Rome 35-yard Field Goal	MCN 17–6
3	7:15	MCN	Ernest Celestie 43-yard touchdown pass from Cody Stroud, Ryan Rome kick good	MCN 24–6
3	1:36	MCN	Marcus Wiltz 11-yard touchdown run, Ryan Rome kick blocked	MCN 30–6
4	14:49	MCN	Ernest Celestie 60-yard touchdown run, Ryan Rome kick failed	MCN 36–6
4	9:55	MCN	Kelvin Bennett 50-yard touchdown run, Jean Breaux kick good	MCN 43–6

=== Sacramento State ===
Sacramento State at Weber State

Team	1	2	3	4	Total
• Hornets	0	14	17	0	31
Wildcats	0	0	3	0	3

- Date: September 28
- Location: Stewart Stadium
  Ogden, UT
- TV announcers (Big Sky TV): Carl Arky and Ty Sparrow

Scoring summary
2	1:04	SAC	DeAndre Carter 15-yard touchdown pass from Garrett Safron, Jesse Aguilar kick good	SAC 7–0
2	0:13	SAC	DeAndre Carter 15-yard touchdown pass from Garrett Safron, Jesse Aguilar kick good	SAC 14–0
3	6:50	WSU	Carson Fackrell 42-yard kick good	SAC 14–3
3	4:51	SAC	DeAndre Carter 51-yard touchdown pass from Garrett Safron, Jesse Aguilar kick good	SAC 21–3
3	2:42	SAC	Jesse Aguilar 20-yard kick good	SAC 24–3
3	1:54	SAC	Chris Broadnax 16-yard touchdown pass from Garrett Safron, Jessie Aguilar kick good	SAC 31–3

=== Eastern Washington ===
Weber State at Eastern Washington

Team	1	2	3	4	Total
Wildcats	6	6	0	7	19
• #6 Eagles	13	14	14	0	41

- Date: October 5
- Location: Roos Field
  Cheney, WA
- Game attendance: 9,734
- Television network: Big Sky TV

=== Cal Poly ===
Weber State at Cal Poly

Team	1	2	3	4	Total
Wildcats	0	0	0	0	0
• Mustangs	6	14	14	13	47

- Date: October 12
- Location: Alex G. Spanos Stadium
  San Luis Obispo, CA
- Television network: Big Sky TV

=== Montana State ===
Montana State at Weber State

Team	1	2	3	4	Total
Bobcats	0	0	0	0	0
Wildcats	0	0	0	0	0

- Date: October 19
- Location: Stewart Stadium
  Ogden, UT
- Television network: ROOT

=== Portland State ===
Weber State at Portland State

Team	1	2	3	4	Total
Wildcats	0	0	0	0	0
Vikings	0	0	0	0	0

- Date: November 2
- Location: Jeld-Wen Field
  Portland, OR
- Television network: Big Sky TV

=== Southern Utah ===
Southern Utah at Weber State

Team	1	2	3	4	Total
Thunderbirds	0	0	0	0	0
Wildcats	0	0	0	0	0

- Date: November 9
- Location: Stewart Stadium
  Ogden, UT
- TV announcers (Big Sky TV): Carl Arky and Ty Sparrow

=== Montana ===
Weber State at Montana

Team	1	2	3	4	Total
Wildcats	0	0	0	0	0
Grizzlies	0	0	0	0	0

- Date: November 16
- Location: Washington–Grizzly Stadium
  Missoula, MT
- Television network: ESPN3

=== Idaho State ===
Idaho State at Weber State

Team	1	2	3	4	Total
Bengals	0	0	0	0	0
Wildcats	0	0	0	0	0

- Date: November 23
- Location: Stewart Stadium
  Ogden, UT
- TV announcers (Big Sky TV): Carl Arky and Ty Sparrow
