= 2013 Eastern Washington Eagles football team =

American college football season

2013 Eastern Washington Eagles football

Big Sky champion

FCS Semifinals, L 31–35 vs. Towson
- Conference: Big Sky Conference

Ranking
- Sports Network: No. 3
- FCS Coaches: No. 3
- Record: 12–3 (8–0 Big Sky)
- Head coach: Beau Baldwin (6th season)
- Offensive coordinator: Aaron Best (6th season)
- Defensive coordinator: John Graham (6th season)
- Home stadium: Roos Field

2013 Big Sky Conference football standings
	Conf.			Overall
Team	W		L	W		L
No. 3 Eastern Washington $^	8	–	0	12	–	3
No. 5 Northern Arizona ^	7	–	1	9	–	3
No. 8 Montana ^	6	–	2	10	–	3
No. 21 Southern Utah ^	5	–	3	8	–	5
No. 20 Montana State	5	–	3	7	–	5
Cal Poly	5	–	3	6	–	6
UC Davis	5	–	3	5	–	7
Sacramento State	4	–	4	5	–	7
Portland State	3	–	5	6	–	6
North Dakota	2	–	6	3	–	8
Idaho State	1	–	7	3	–	9
Weber State	1	–	7	2	–	10
Northern Colorado	0	–	8	1	–	11
$ – Conference champion; ^ – FCS playoff participant; Rankings from The Sports Network poll

The 2013 Eastern Washington Eagles football team represented Eastern Washington University in the 2013 NCAA Division I FCS football season. The team was coached by Beau Baldwin, who was in his sixth season with Eastern Washington. The Eagles played their home games at Roos Field in Cheney, Washington and were a member of the Big Sky Conference. They finished with a record of 11–3, 8–0 in Big Sky Championship to win the capture of the Big Sky Regular season title. They qualify for the FCS playoffs which they defeated South Dakota State in the second round, Jacksonville State in the quarterfinals before losing to Towson in the semifinals.

== Schedule ==
Date	Time	Opponent	Rank	Site	TV	Result	Attendance
August 31	3:00 pm	at No. 25 (FBS) Oregon State*	No. 4	Reser Stadium; Corvallis, OR	P12N	W 49–46	41,649
September 7	4:05 pm	Western Oregon*	No. 2	Roos Field; Cheney, WA		W 43–14	6,349
September 14	4:00 pm	at Toledo*	No. 2	Glass Bowl; Toledo, OH	ESPN3	L 21–33	20,459
September 28	12:00 pm	at No. 4 Sam Houston State*	No. 2	Bowers Stadium; Huntsville, TX	CSNNW	L 34–49	8,621
October 5	4:05 pm	Weber State	No. 6	Roos Field; Cheney, WA	SWX	W 41–19	9,734
October 12	12:30 pm	at North Dakota	No. 6	Alerus Center; Grand Forks, ND	MSN	W 35–14	7,951
October 19	5:05 pm	Southern Utah^{†}	No. 4	Roos Field; Cheney, WA	SWX	W 34–10	10,135
October 26	12:35 pm	at No. 10 Montana	No. 3	Washington–Grizzly Stadium; Missoula, MT (EWU–UM Governors Cup)	RTNW	W 42–37	26,082
November 2	2:00 pm	at Idaho State	No. 3	Holt Arena; Pocatello, ID		W 55–34	4,984
November 9	12:05 pm	No. 4 Montana State*	No. 3	Roos Field; Cheney, WA	RTNW	W 54–29	10,223
November 16	12:30 pm	at Cal Poly	No. 3	Alex G. Spanos Stadium; San Luis Obispo, CA	RTNW	W 35–22	6,847
November 23	2:30 pm	Portland State	No. 3	Roos Field; Cheney, WA (The Dam Cup)	RTNW	W 42–41	9,522
December 7	1:00 pm	No. 13 South Dakota State*	No. 3	Roos Field; Cheney, WA (NCAA Division I Second Round)	ESPN3	W 41–17	6,127
December 14	1:00 pm	No. 20 Jacksonville State*	No. 3	Roos Field; Cheney, WA (NCAA Division I Quarterfinal)	ESPN3	W 35–24	4,277
December 21	11:00 am	No. 5 Towson*	No. 3	Roos Field; Cheney, WA (NCAA Division I Semifinal)	ESPNU	L 31–35	6,209
*Non-conference game; ^{†}Homecoming; Rankings from The Sports Network Poll released prior to the game; All times are in Pacific time

== Game summaries ==
=== @ Oregon State ===
	1	2	3	4	Total
#4 Eagles	6	23	7	13	49
#25 (FBS) Beavers	7	10	15	14	46

The Eagles upset of AP #25 Oregon State is only the fourth time ever that a ranked FBS team has been beaten by an FCS program.

=== Western Oregon ===
	1	2	3	4	Total
Wolves	0	0	0	14	14
#2 Eagles	29	0	7	7	43

=== @ Toledo ===
	1	2	3	4	Total
#2 Eagles	14	0	0	7	21
Rockets	13	3	7	10	33

=== @ Sam Houston State ===
	1	2	3	4	Total
#2 Eagles	13	7	7	7	34
#4 Bearkats	7	21	14	7	49

Last seasons meeting was in the FCS Playoffs.

=== Weber State ===
	1	2	3	4	Total
Wildcats	6	6	0	7	19
#6 Eagles	13	14	14	0	41

=== @ North Dakota ===
	1	2	3	4	Total
#6 Eagles	0	14	14	7	35
North Dakota	3	3	8	0	14

=== Southern Utah ===
	1	2	3	4	Total
Thunderbirds	0	3	0	7	10
#4 Eagles	14	0	13	7	34

=== @ Montana ===
	1	2	3	4	Total
#3 Eagles	7	21	14	0	42
#10 Grizzlies	3	14	0	20	37

=== @ Idaho State ===
	1	2	3	4	Total
#3 Eagles	10	21	17	7	55
Bengals	10	14	3	7	34

=== Montana State ===
	1	2	3	4	Total
#4 Bobcats	7	14	0	8	29
#3 Eagles	13	13	14	14	54

=== @ Cal Poly ===
	1	2	3	4	Total
#3 Eagles	0	14	21	0	35
Mustangs	3	0	0	19	22

=== Portland State ===
	1	2	3	4	Total
Vikings	7	14	0	20	41
#3 Eagles	7	0	14	21	42

== Ranking movements ==
Ranking movements Legend: ██ Increase in ranking ██ Decrease in ranking
	Week														
Poll	Pre	1	2	3	4	5	6	7	8	9	10	11	12	13	Final
Sports Network	4	2	2	2	2	6	6	4	3	3	3	3	3	3	3
Coaches	3	2	2	4	3	8	8	6	4	4	4	3	3	3	3
