= 2013 Sacramento State Hornets football team =

American college football season

2013 Sacramento State Hornets football
- Conference: Big Sky Conference
- Record: 5–7 (4–4 Big Sky)
- Head coach: Marshall Sperbeck (7th season)
- Offensive coordinator: Paul Peterson (2nd season)
- Defensive coordinator: Anthony Parker (4th season)
- Home stadium: Hornet Stadium

2013 Big Sky Conference football standings
	Conf.			Overall
Team	W		L	W		L
No. 3 Eastern Washington $^	8	–	0	12	–	3
No. 5 Northern Arizona ^	7	–	1	9	–	3
No. 8 Montana ^	6	–	2	10	–	3
No. 21 Southern Utah ^	5	–	3	8	–	5
No. 20 Montana State	5	–	3	7	–	5
Cal Poly	5	–	3	6	–	6
UC Davis	5	–	3	5	–	7
Sacramento State	4	–	4	5	–	7
Portland State	3	–	5	6	–	6
North Dakota	2	–	6	3	–	8
Idaho State	1	–	7	3	–	9
Weber State	1	–	7	2	–	10
Northern Colorado	0	–	8	1	–	11
$ – Conference champion; ^ – FCS playoff participant; Rankings from The Sports Network poll

The 2013 Sacramento State Hornets football team represented California State University, Sacramento as a member of the Big Sky Conference during the 2013 NCAA Division I FCS football season. Led by Marshall Sperbeck in his seventh in final season as head coach, Sacramento State compiled an overall record of 5–7 with a mark of 4–4 in conference play, placing eighth in the Big Sky. The Hornets played home games at Hornet Stadium in Sacramento, California.

Sperbeck resigned as head coach on April 29, 2014. He finished his tenure at Sacramento State with a record of 35–44.

== Schedule ==
Date	Time	Opponent	Site	TV	Result	Attendance
August 29	7:00 pm	at San Jose State*	Spartan Stadium; San Jose, CA	mtn	L 0–24	13,136
September 5	7:00 pm	at Arizona State*	Sun Devil Stadium; Tempe, AZ	P12N	L 0–55	55,743
September 14	6:05 pm	Southern Oregon*	Hornet Stadium; Sacramento, CA	BSTV	W 63–56 ^{OT}	7,543
September 21	6:05 pm	Southern Utah*	Hornet Stadium; Sacramento, CA	BSTV	L 21–24 ^{OT}	5,612
September 28	5:00 pm	at Weber State	Stewart Stadium; Ogden, UT	BSTV	W 31–3	6,610
October 5	6:05 pm	Northern Colorado^{†}	Hornet Stadium; Sacramento, CA	BSTV	W 37–21	9,012
October 12	6:05 pm	No. 19 Northern Arizona	Hornet Stadium; Sacramento, CA	BSTV	L 38–39	6,108
October 19	12:30 pm	at North Dakota	Alerus Center; Grand Forks, ND	BSTV	W 31–7	6,634
November 2	1:05 pm	No. 12 Montana	Hornet Stadium; Sacramento, CA	ESPN3	L 48–51 ^{OT}	6,361
November 9	6:05 pm	at Cal Poly	Alex G. Spanos Stadium; San Luis Obispo, CA	BSTV	L 7–42	7,031
November 16	1:05 pm	at Portland State	Jeld-Wen Field; Portland, OR	BSTV	W 43–42	4,553
November 23	1:05 pm	UC Davis	Hornet Stadium; Sacramento, CA (Causeway Classic)	BSTV	L 7–34	12,571
*Non-conference game; ^{†}Homecoming; Rankings from The Sports Network Poll released prior to the game; All times are in Pacific time

Despite Southern Utah also being a member of the Big Sky, the September 15 game against Sacramento State was considered a non-conference game.
