= 2013 Northern Arizona Lumberjacks football team =

American college football season

2013 Northern Arizona Lumberjacks football
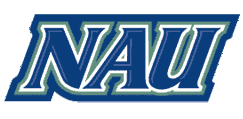

FCS Playoffs First Round, L 7–26 vs. South Dakota State
- Conference: Big Sky Conference

Ranking
- Sports Network: No. 15
- FCS Coaches: No. 15
- Record: 9–3 (7–1 Big Sky)
- Head coach: Jerome Souers (16th season)
- Offensive coordinator: Rich Scangarello (2nd season)
- Defensive coordinator: Andy Thompson (5th season)
- Home stadium: Walkup Skydome

2013 Big Sky Conference football standings
	Conf.			Overall
Team	W		L	W		L
No. 3 Eastern Washington $^	8	–	0	12	–	3
No. 5 Northern Arizona ^	7	–	1	9	–	3
No. 8 Montana ^	6	–	2	10	–	3
No. 21 Southern Utah ^	5	–	3	8	–	5
No. 20 Montana State	5	–	3	7	–	5
Cal Poly	5	–	3	6	–	6
UC Davis	5	–	3	5	–	7
Sacramento State	4	–	4	5	–	7
Portland State	3	–	5	6	–	6
North Dakota	2	–	6	3	–	8
Idaho State	1	–	7	3	–	9
Weber State	1	–	7	2	–	10
Northern Colorado	0	–	8	1	–	11
$ – Conference champion; ^ – FCS playoff participant; Rankings from The Sports Network poll

The 2013 Northern Arizona Lumberjacks football team represented Northern Arizona University in the 2013 NCAA Division I FCS football season. They were led by 16th-year head coach Jerome Souers and played their home games at the Walkup Skydome. They were a member of the Big Sky Conference. They finished the season 9–3, 7–1 in Big Sky play to finish in second place. They were received an at-large bid to the FCS Playoffs where they lost in the first round to South Dakota State.

== Schedule ==
Date	Time	Opponent	Rank	Site	TV	Result	Attendance
August 30	8:00 pm	at Arizona*	No. 18	Arizona Stadium; Tucson, AZ	P12N	L 0–35	53,793
September 14	7:00 pm	at UC Davis*	No. 25	Aggie Stadium; Davis, CA	BSTV	W 21–10	4,932
September 21	4:00 pm	South Dakota*	No. 25	Walkup Skydome; Flagstaff, AZ	FSAZ+/NAU-TV/BSTV	W 22–16	7,855
September 28	6:00 pm	No. 7 Montana	No. 24	Walkup Skydome; Flagstaff, AZ	Audience	W 34–16	12,640
October 5	2:35 pm	at No. 8 Montana State	No. 15	Bobcat Stadium; Bozeman, MT	ESPN3	L 7–36	21,027
October 12	7:05 pm	at Sacramento State	No. 19	Hornet Stadium; Sacramento, CA	BSTV	W 39–38	6,108
October 19	4:00 pm	Idaho State^{†}	No. 19	Walkup Skydome; Flagstaff, AZ	FSAZ+/NAU-TV/BSTV	W 39–30	8,242
October 26	6:05 pm	at Cal Poly	No. 16	Alex G. Spanos Stadium; San Luis Obispo, CA	BSTV	W 17–13	9,882
November 2	3:00 pm	North Dakota	No. 14	Walkup Skydome; Flagstaff, AZ	FSAZ+/NAU-TV/BSTV	W 48–27	4,895
November 16	12:00 pm	Northern Colorado	No. 12	Walkup Skydome; Flagstaff, AZ	FSAZ+/NAU-TV/BSTV	W 24–7	6,737
November 23	1:05 pm	at No. 20 Southern Utah	No. 10	Eccles Coliseum; Cedar City, UT (Grand Canyon Rivalry)	BSTV	W 20–10	2,521
November 30	6:00 pm	No. 13 South Dakota State*	No. 8	Walkup Skydome; Flagstaff, AZ (NCAA Division I First Round)	ESPN3	L 7–26	5,077
*Non-conference game; ^{†}Homecoming; Rankings from The Sports Network Poll released prior to the game; All times are in Mountain time

Despite also being a member of the Big Sky Conference, the game with UC Davis on September 14 is considered a non conference game and will have no effect on the Big Sky Standings.

== Ranking movements ==
Ranking movements Legend: ██ Increase in ranking ██ Decrease in ranking
	Week														
Poll	Pre	1	2	3	4	5	6	7	8	9	10	11	12	13	Final
Sports Network	18	22	25	25	24	15	19	19	16	14	14	12	10	8	15
Coaches	18	24	24	22	22	17	21	21	19	14	14	13	12	9	15
