= 2013 Portland State Vikings football team =

American college football season

2013 Portland State Vikings football
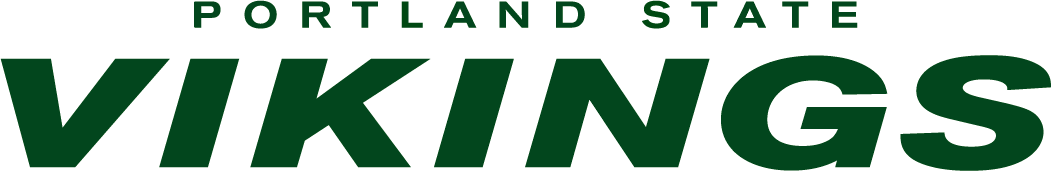
- Conference: Big Sky Conference
- Record: 6–6 (3–5 Big Sky)
- Head coach: Nigel Burton (4th season)
- Offensive coordinator: Bruce Barnum (4th season)
- Offensive scheme: Pistol
- Defensive coordinator: Jaime Hill (1st season)
- Base defense: 3–4
- Home stadium: Jeld-Wen Field

2013 Big Sky Conference football standings
	Conf.			Overall
Team	W		L	W		L
No. 3 Eastern Washington $^	8	–	0	12	–	3
No. 5 Northern Arizona ^	7	–	1	9	–	3
No. 8 Montana ^	6	–	2	10	–	3
No. 21 Southern Utah ^	5	–	3	8	–	5
No. 20 Montana State	5	–	3	7	–	5
Cal Poly	5	–	3	6	–	6
UC Davis	5	–	3	5	–	7
Sacramento State	4	–	4	5	–	7
Portland State	3	–	5	6	–	6
North Dakota	2	–	6	3	–	8
Idaho State	1	–	7	3	–	9
Weber State	1	–	7	2	–	10
Northern Colorado	0	–	8	1	–	11
$ – Conference champion; ^ – FCS playoff participant; Rankings from The Sports Network poll

The 2013 Portland State Vikings football team represented Portland State University in the 2013 NCAA Division I FCS football season. They were led by fourth year head coach Nigel Burton and played their home games at Jeld-Wen Field. They were a member of the Big Sky Conference. They finished the season 6–6, 3–5 in Big Sky play to finish in ninth place.

== Schedule ==
Date	Time	Opponent	Site	TV	Result	Attendance
August 29	7:05 pm	Eastern Oregon*	Jeld-Wen Field; Portland, Oregon	BSTV	W 57–17	5,174
September 7	2:00 pm	at California*	California Memorial Stadium; Berkeley, California	P12N	L 30–37	43,594
September 14	1:05 pm	Humboldt State*	Jeld-Wen Field; Portland, Oregon	BSTV	W 43–6	5,028
September 21	6:00 pm	at UC Davis*	Aggie Stadium; Davis, California	BSTV	W 41–10	5,040
September 26	7:05 pm	No. 18 Cal Poly	Jeld-Wen Field; Portland, Oregon	RTNW	L 34–38	6,726
October 5	12:35 pm	at No. 10 Montana	Washington–Grizzly Stadium; Missoula, Montana	RTNW	L 27–55	25,604
October 12	1:05 pm	at Southern Utah	Eccles Coliseum; Cedar City, Utah	BSTV	L 7–17	6,539
October 26	1:05 pm	North Dakota	Jeld-Wen Field; Portland, Oregon	BSTV	W 14–10	5,120
November 2	1:05 pm	Weber State	Jeld-Wen Field; Portland, Oregon	BSTV	W 45–24	4,285
November 9	2:00 pm	at Idaho State	Holt Arena; Pocatello, Idaho	BSTV	W 38–31	4,926
November 16	1:05 pm	Sacramento State	Jeld-Wen Field; Portland, Oregon	BSTV	L 42–43	4,553
November 23	2:35 pm	at No. 3 Eastern Washington	Roos Field; Cheney, Washington (The Dam Cup)	RTNW	L 41–42	9,522
*Non-conference game; Rankings from The Sports Network Poll released prior to the game; All times are in Pacific time

Despite also being a member of the Big Sky Conference, the game with UC Davis on September 21 is considered a non conference game and will have no effect on the Big Sky Standings.

== Game summaries ==
=== Eastern Oregon ===
	1	2	3	4	Total
Mountaineers	0	0	3	14	17
Vikings	14	22	0	21	57

=== @ California ===
	1	2	3	4	Total
Vikings	14	9	7	0	30
Golden Bears	10	17	10	0	37

=== Humboldt State ===
	1	2	3	4	Total
Lumberjacks	0	6	0	0	6
Vikings	7	6	23	7	43

=== @ UC Davis ===
	1	2	3	4	Total
Vikings	7	7	13	14	41
Aggies	0	7	3	0	10

=== Cal Poly ===
	1	2	3	4	Total
#18 Mustangs	0	7	14	17	38
Vikings	7	14	0	13	34

=== @ Montana ===
	1	2	3	4	Total
Vikings	13	7	0	7	27
#10 Grizzlies	21	14	10	10	55

=== @ Southern Utah ===
	1	2	3	4	Total
Vikings	0	7	0	0	7
Thunderbirds	0	10	0	7	17

=== North Dakota ===
	1	2	3	4	Total
North Dakota	7	3	0	0	10
Vikings	0	0	0	17	17

=== Weber State ===
	1	2	3	4	Total
Wildcats	3	7	7	7	24
Vikings	10	14	7	14	45

=== @ Idaho State ===
	1	2	3	4	Total
Vikings	21	7	10	0	38
Bengals	7	14	7	3	31

=== Sacramento State ===
	1	2	3	4	Total
Hornets	3	7	21	12	43
Vikings	7	14	14	7	42

=== @ Eastern Washington ===
	1	2	3	4	Total
Vikings	7	14	0	20	41
#3 Eagles	7	0	14	21	42
