= KSUU =

Radio station at Southern Utah University in Cedar City, Utah

- Cedar City, Utah; United States
- Frequency: 91.1 MHz
- Branding: Thunder 91.1

Programming
- Format: Variety

Ownership
- Owner: Southern Utah University

History
- First air date: 1965 (as KCDR)
- Former call signs: 1965–1980 as KCDR; 1980–1994 as KGSU-FM
- Call sign meaning: Southern Utah University

Technical information
- Licensing authority: FCC
- Facility ID: 61381
- Class: C3
- ERP: 10,000 watts
- HAAT: −141.0 meters (−462.6 ft)
- Transmitter coordinates: 37°38′55.00″N 113°5′32.00″W

Links
- Public license information: Public file; LMS

KSUU (91.1 FM) is a student-run radio station broadcasting a variety format. Licensed to Cedar City, Utah, United States, the station is owned by the Southern Utah University.

== History ==
The station went on the air as KCDR in 1965 on 88.1 MHz. The call letters and frequency changed to KGSU-FM on 90.1 MHz on September 30, 1980. In 1982, it changed to the current frequency of 91.1 MHz. On December 23, 1994, the station changed its call sign to the current KSUU. This was done so the call would reflect the name change of the school which owns the station.
