= List of Campbell Fighting Camels football seasons =

The following is a list of seasons completed by the Campbell Fighting Camels football team. Based in Buies Creek, North Carolina, the Camels currently compete in the Big South Conference of the NCAA Division I FCS. The Camels joined the conference in 2018. Previously, Campbell was a member of the non-scholarship Pioneer League. Since the program's inception in 2008, Campbell has had two head football coaches, the first of which was Dale Steele, who led the team through its first five seasons and attained a 14–41 overall record. Steele was replaced in 2012 by Mike Minter who most recently completed his tenth season as head coach of the Camels.

== Seasons ==
Legend

^{†} Conference champions
^{‡} Division champions
Bowl game berth
Playoff berth

List of Campbell Fighting Camels football seasons
Season	Team	Head coach	Conference	Regular season results							Postseason results	Final ranking	
Season	Team	Head coach	Conference	Overall			Conference				Bowl game/Playoff result	TSN Poll	Coaches' Poll
Season	Team	Head coach	Conference	Win	Loss	Tie	Win	Loss	Tie	Finish	Bowl game/Playoff result	TSN Poll	Coaches' Poll
Campbell Fighting Camels
2008	2008	Dale Steele	Pioneer	1	10		0	8		9th	—	—	—
2009	2009	Dale Steele	Pioneer	3	8		2	6		8th	—	—	—
2010	2010	Dale Steele	Pioneer	3	8		2	6		T–7th	—	—	—
2011	2011	Dale Steele	Pioneer	6	5		5	3		4th	—	—	—
2012	2012	Dale Steele	Pioneer	1	10		0	8		10th	—	—	—
2013	2013	Mike Minter	Pioneer	3	9		1	7		8th	—	—	—
2014	2014	Mike Minter	Pioneer	5	7		4	4		T–5th	—	—	—
2015	2015	Mike Minter	Pioneer	5	6		3	5		8th	—	—	—
2016	2016	Mike Minter	Pioneer	5	5		3	4		6th	—	—	—
2017	2017	Mike Minter	Pioneer	6	5		5	3		T–3rd	—	—	—
2018	2018	Mike Minter	Big South	6	5		1	4		5th	—	—	—
2019	2019	Mike Minter	Big South	6	5		3	3		4th	—	—	—
2020	2020	Mike Minter	Big South	0	4		0	0		—	—	—	—
2021	2021	Mike Minter	Big South	3	8		2	5		T–8th	—	—	—
2022	2022	Mike Minter	Big South	5	6		2	3		T–3rd	—	—	—
2023	2023	Mike Minter	CAA	5	6		4	4		T–6th	—	—	—
2024	2024	Braxton Harris	CAA	3	9		1	7		14th	—	—	—
2025	2025	Braxton Harris	CAA	2	10		2	6		T–10th	—	—	—
Totals				All-time: 68–126 (.351)			Conference: 40–86 (.317)			–	Playoffs: 0–0 (–)	–	–
