= List of Campbell Fighting Camels head football coaches =

The Campbell Fighting Camels college football team represents Campbell University in the Big South Conference. The Fighting Camels currently compete as a member of the National Collegiate Athletic Association (NCAA) Division I Football Championship Subdivision. The program has had three different head coaches since it began play during the 2008 season.

Campbell has played 159 games over 15 seasons, appearing in no bowl games and earning no postseason appearances.

== Key ==
Key to symbols in coaches list
General		Overall		Conference		Postseason (Note: Although the first Rose Bowl Game was played in 1902, it has been continuously played since the 1916 game, and is recognized as the oldest bowl game by the NCAA. "—" indicates any season prior to 1916 when postseason games were not played.)	
No.	Order of coaches (Note: A running total of the number of head coaches, with coaches who served separate tenures being counted only once. Interim head coaches are represented with "Int" and are not counted in the running total. "—" indicates the team played but either without a coach or no coach is on record. "X" indicates an interim year without play.)	GC	Games coached	CW	Conference wins	PW	Postseason wins
DC	Division championships	OW	Overall wins	CL	Conference losses	PL	Postseason losses
CC	Conference championships	OL	Overall losses	CT	Conference ties	PT	Postseason ties
NC	National championships	OT	Overall ties (Note: Overtime rules in college football were introduced in 1996, making ties impossible in the period since.)	C%	Conference winning percentage		
†	Elected to the College Football Hall of Fame	O%	Overall winning percentage (Note: When computing the win–loss percentage, a tie counts as half a win and half a loss.)				

== Coaches ==
List of head football coaches showing season(s) coached, overall records, conference records, postseason records, championships and selected awards (Note: Statistics correct as of the end of the 2025 NCAA Division I FCS football season.)
No.	Name	Season(s)	GC	OW	OL	OT	O%	CW	CL	CT	C%	PW	PL	PT	DC	CC	NC	Awards
1	Dale Steele	2008–12	55	14	41	–	0.255	9	31	–	0.225	—	—	—	—	—	0	
2	Mike Minter	2013–2023	115	49	66	–	0.426	29	41	–	0.414	—	—	—	—	—	0	
3	Braxton Harris	2024–present	24	5	19	–	0.208	3	13	–	0.188	—	—	—	—	—	0	
