= 2008 Davidson Wildcats football team =

American college football season

2008 Davidson Wildcats football
- Conference: Pioneer Football League
- Record: 4–7 (3–5 PFL)
- Head coach: Tripp Merritt (4th season)
- Home stadium: Richardson Stadium

2008 Pioneer Football League standings
	Conf.			Overall
Team	W		L	W		L
Jacksonville $	7	–	1	9	–	4
San Diego	6	–	2	9	–	2
Dayton	6	–	2	9	–	3
Butler	4	–	4	6	–	5
Drake	4	–	4	6	–	5
Morehead State	4	–	4	6	–	6
Davidson	3	–	5	4	–	7
Valparaiso	2	–	6	3	–	8
Campbell	0	–	8	1	–	10
$ – Conference champion

The 2008 Davidson Wildcats football team represented Davidson College as a member of the Pioneer Football League (PFL) during the 2008 NCAA Division I FCS football season. Led by fourth-year head coach Tripp Merritt, the Wildcats compiled an overall record of 4–7 with a mark of 3–5 in conference play, placing seventh in the PFL. The team played home games at Richardson Stadium in Davidson, North Carolina.

== Schedule ==
Date	Time	Opponent	Site	Result	Attendance
September 6	6:00 p.m.	at UNC Pembroke*	Grace P. Johnson Stadium; Pembroke, NC	L 9–21	3,790
September 13	7:00 p.m.	at Lenoir–Rhyne*	Moretz Stadium; Hickory, NC	W 20–16	7,826
September 27	2:00 p.m.	Jacksonville	Richardson Stadium; Davidson, NC	W 38–35	4,218
October 4	1:00 p.m.	at Morehead State	Jayne Stadium; Morehead, KY	L 13–26	3,875
October 11	2:00 p.m.	at Valparaiso	Field Stadium; Valparaiso, IN	L 29–35 ^{OT}	4,178
October 18	1:00 p.m.	Dayton	Richardson Stadium; Davidson, NC	L 22–41	3,823
October 25	2:00 p.m.	at Drake	Drake Stadium; Des Moines, IA	L 17–20	2,809
November 1	1:00 p.m.	at Campbell	Barker-Lane Stadium; Buies Creek, NC	W 49–0	4,054
November 8	1:00 p.m.	San Diego	Richardson Stadium; Davidson, NC	L 24–28	4,279
November 15	12:00 p.m.	Marist*	Richardson Stadium; Davidson, NC	L 19–24	2,643
November 22	12:00 p.m.	Butler	Richardson Stadium; Davidson, NC	W 46–34	2,812
*Non-conference game; All times are in Eastern time
