= 2012 Marist Red Foxes football team =

American college football season

2012 Marist Red Foxes football
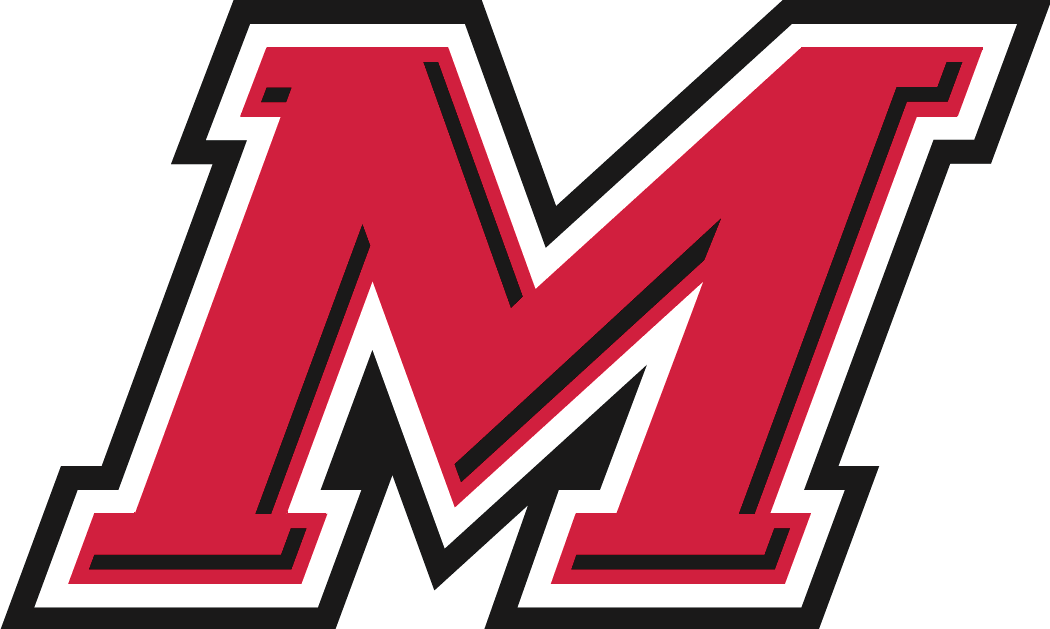
- Conference: Pioneer Football League
- Record: 4–7 (3–5 PFL)
- Head coach: Jim Parady (21st season)
- Defensive coordinator: Scott Rumsey (13th season)
- Home stadium: Tenney Stadium at Leonidoff Field

2012 Pioneer Football League standings
| | Conf. | | | Overall |
| Team | W | | L | W | | L |
|---|---|---|---|---|---|---|
| Butler + | 7 | – | 1 | 8 | – | 3 |
| Drake + | 7 | – | 1 | 8 | – | 3 |
| San Diego + | 7 | – | 1 | 8 | – | 3 |
| Jacksonville | 5 | – | 3 | 7 | – | 4 |
| Dayton | 5 | – | 3 | 6 | – | 5 |
| Marist | 3 | – | 5 | 4 | – | 7 |
| Morehead State | 3 | – | 5 | 4 | – | 7 |
| Davidson | 2 | – | 6 | 2 | – | 9 |
| Valparaiso | 1 | – | 7 | 1 | – | 10 |
| Campbell | 0 | – | 8 | 1 | – | 10 |
+ – Conference co-champions

The 2012 Marist Red Foxes football team represented Marist College as a member of the Pioneer Football League (PFL) during the 2012 NCAA Division I FCS football season. Led by 21st-year head coach Jim Parady, the Red Foxes compiled an overall record of 4–7 with a mark of 3–5 in conference play, tying for sixth place in the PFL. Marist played home games at Tenney Stadium at Leonidoff Field in Poughkeepsie, New York.

== Schedule ==
| Date | Time | Opponent | Site | Result | Attendance |
|---|---|---|---|---|---|
| September 1 | 3:00 pm | at Bryant* | Bulldog Stadium; Smithfield, RI | W 35–10 | 3,812 |
| September 8 | 6:00 pm | Bucknell* | Tenney Stadium at Leonidoff Field; Poughkeepsie, NY | L 17–19 | 2,187 |
| September 15 | 12:30 pm | at Columbia* | Robert K. Kraft Field at Lawrence A. Wien Stadium; Manhattan, NY | L 9–10 | 3,933 |
| September 22 | 12:00 pm | Davidson^{†} | Tenney Stadium at Leonidoff Field; Poughkeepsie, NY | W 34–21 | 2,466 |
| September 29 | 1:00 pm | at Jacksonville | D. B. Milne Field; Jacksonville, FL | L 14–26 | 3,323 |
| October 13 | 1:00 pm | Butler | Tenney Stadium at Leonidoff Field; Poughkeepsie, NY | L 14–17 | 1,796 |
| October 20 | 1:00 pm | at Drake | Drake Stadium; Des Moines, IA | L 27–34 ^{OT} | 1,805 |
| October 27 | 2:00 pm | at Valparaiso | Brown Field; Valparaiso, IN | W 44–7 | 1,333 |
| November 3 | 4:00 pm | San Diego | Tenney Stadium at Leonidoff Field; Poughkeepsie, NY | Postponed | |
| November 10 | 12:00 pm | Dayton | Tenney Stadium at Leonidoff Field; Poughkeepsie, NY | L 17–21 | 1,666 |
| November 17 | 1:00 pm | at Campbell | Barker–Lane Stadium; Buies Creek, NC | W 28–7 | 2,310 |
| December 1 | 12:00 pm | San Diego | Tenney Stadium at Leonidoff Field; Poughkeepsie, NY | L 10–34 | 1,066 |
*Non-conference game; ^{†}Homecoming; All times are in Eastern time

The November 3 game against San Diego was postponed due to effects from Hurricane Sandy. The game was rescheduled for December 1.
