= Brett Hayford =

American football player and coach

Current position
- Title: Athletic director
- Team: Pine Lake Prep (NC)
- Conference: NCHSAA

Playing career
- 1989–1992: Davidson
- Position: Defensive lineman

Coaching career (HC unless noted)
- 1993–2012: Davidson (DL)
- 2012: Davidson (interim HC)
- 2013–2014: Davidson (DL)
- 2015–2019: Pine Lake Prep (NC)

Administrative career (AD unless noted)
- 2019–present: Pine Lake Prep (NC)

Head coaching record
- Overall: 1–1 (college)

Brett Hayford is an American former football player and coach. He is the athletic director at Pine Lake Preparatory school in Mooresville, North Carolina, a position he had held since 2019. Hayford served as the interim head football coach at his alma mater, Davidson College in Davidson, North Carolina, for the final two games of the 2012 season, compiling a record of 1–1.

== Head coaching record ==
=== College ===
Year	Team	Overall	Conference	Standing	Bowl/playoffs
Davidson Wildcats (Pioneer Football League) (2012)
2012	Davidson	1–1 (Note: Tripp Merritt served as head coach for the first nine games of the 2012 season before he was fired on November 5. Hayford was named interim head coach and led Davidson for the final two games of the season. The Wildcats finished 2–9 overall and 2–6 in Pioneer Football League play.)	1–1	8th	
Davidson:		1–1	1–1		
Total:		1–1			
