= 1925 Campbell Fighting Camels football team =

American college football season

1925 Campbell Fighting Camels football
- Conference: Independent
- Record: 2–0
- Head coach: Edge (1st season); Baker

The 1925 Campbell Fighting Camels football team represented Campbell University during the 1925 college football season. They finished with a 2–0 record.

== Schedule ==
Date	Opponent	Site	Result
Unknown	Carthage	Unknown	W 7–0
Unknown	Duke (NC) HS	Unknown	W 20–0
