= 2012 Drake Bulldogs football team =

American college football season

2012 Drake Bulldogs football

PFL co-champion
- Conference: Pioneer Football League
- Record: 8–3 (7–1 PFL)
- Head coach: Chris Creighton (5th season)
- Offensive scheme: Multiple
- Defensive coordinator: Brad McCaslin (1st season)
- Base defense: 4–3
- Home stadium: Drake Stadium

2012 Pioneer Football League standings
	Conf.			Overall
Team	W		L	W		L
Butler +	7	–	1	8	–	3
Drake +	7	–	1	8	–	3
San Diego +	7	–	1	8	–	3
Jacksonville	5	–	3	7	–	4
Dayton	5	–	3	6	–	5
Marist	3	–	5	4	–	7
Morehead State	3	–	5	4	–	7
Davidson	2	–	6	2	–	9
Valparaiso	1	–	7	1	–	10
Campbell	0	–	8	1	–	10
+ – Conference co-champions

The 2012 Drake Bulldogs football team represented Drake University as member of the Pioneer Football League (PFL) during the 2012 NCAA Division I FCS football season. Led by fifth-year head coach Chris Creighton, the Bulldogs compiled and overall record of 8–3 with a mark of 7–1 in conference play, sharing the PFL title with Butler and San Diego. This was the second consecutive season that Drake claimed a share of the conference championship. The team played home games at Drake Stadium in Des Moines, Iowa.

== Schedule ==
Date	Time	Opponent	Site	Result	Attendance
August 30	1:00 pm	Grand View*	Drake Stadium; Des Moines, IA	W 28–8	4,158
September 8	6:00 pm	No. 4 Montana State*	Drake Stadium; Des Moines, IA	L 24–34	3,558
September 15	1:00 pm	at No. 22 Indiana State*	Memorial Stadium; Terre Haute, IN	L 10–27	7,189
September 22	1:00 pm	Morehead State	Drake Stadium; Des Moines, IA	W 28–25	3,540
September 29	12:00 pm	at Campbell	Barker–Lane Stadium; Buies Creek, NC	W 35–7	3,370
October 6	1:00 pm	San Diego	Drake Stadium; Des Moines, IA	W 38–10	3,154
October 13	12:00 pm	at Valparaiso	Brown Field; Valparaiso, IN	W 35–21	1,189
October 20	1:00 pm	Marist	Drake Stadium; Des Moines, IA	W 34–27 ^{OT}	1,805
November 3	12:00 pm	at Dayton	Welcome Stadium; Dayton, OH (rivalry)	L 13–28	2,641
November 10	1:00 pm	Butler	Drake Stadium; Des Moines, IA	W 45–20	2,833
November 17	12:00 pm	at Jacksonville	D. B. Milne Field; Jacksonville, FL	W 32–29	2,012
*Non-conference game; Rankings from The Sports Network Poll released prior to the game; All times are in Central time
