= 2012 Davidson Wildcats football team =

American college football season

2012 Davidson Wildcats football
- Conference: Pioneer Football League
- Record: 2–9 (2–6 PFL)
- Head coach: Tripp Merritt (8th season: 1–9, fired); Brett Hayford (1st season: 10–11, interim)
- Offensive coordinator: Matt Mumme (2nd season)
- Defensive coordinator: Meade Clendaniel
- Home stadium: Richardson Stadium

2012 Pioneer Football League standings
	Conf.			Overall
Team	W		L	W		L
Butler +	7	–	1	8	–	3
Drake +	7	–	1	8	–	3
San Diego +	7	–	1	8	–	3
Jacksonville	5	–	3	7	–	4
Dayton	5	–	3	6	–	5
Marist	3	–	5	4	–	7
Morehead State	3	–	5	4	–	7
Davidson	2	–	6	2	–	9
Valparaiso	1	–	7	1	–	10
Campbell	0	–	8	1	–	10
+ – Conference co-champions

The 2012 Davidson Wildcats football team represented Davidson College in the 2012 NCAA Division I FCS football season. They were led by eighth-year head coach Tripp Merritt and played their home games at Richardson Stadium. They were a member of the Pioneer Football League (PFL). Merritt was fired on November 5 after a 1–8 start and 31–51 mark in eight seasons. Associate head coach Brett Hayford was named the interim head coach for the remainder of the season. They finished the season 2–9 overall 2–6 in PFL play to finish in eighth place.

== Schedule ==
Date	Time	Opponent	Site	Result	Attendance
September 1	6:00 pm	Georgetown*	Richardson Stadium; Davidson, NC	L 14–35	4,011
September 8	7:00 pm	at Lenoir-Rhyne*	Moretz Stadium; Hickory, NC	L 2–20	6,469
September 22	12:00 pm	at Marist	Tenney Stadium at Leonidoff Field; Poughkeepsie, NY	L 21–34	2,466
September 29	6:00 pm	Presbyterian*	Richardson Stadium; Davidson, NC	L 13–28	4,111
October 6	1:00 pm	Dayton	Richardson Stadium; Davidson, NC	L 3–38	2,216
October 13	1:00 pm	Jacksonville	Richardson Stadium; Davidson, NC	L 24–34	1,924
October 20	6:00 pm	at Campbell	Barker–Lane Stadium; Buies Creek, NC	W 28–21	4,640
October 27	12:00 pm	Butler	Richardson Stadium; Davidson, NC	L 20–31	3,362
November 3	1:00 pm	at Morehead State	Jayne Stadium; Morehead, KY	L 14–49	1,113
November 10	1:00 pm	at Valparaiso	Brown Field; Valparaiso, IN	W 28–27 ^{OT}	1,827
November 17	1:00 pm	San Diego	Richardson Stadium; Davidson, NC	L 10–17	3,712
*Non-conference game; All times are in Eastern time
