= 2009 Jacksonville Dolphins football team =

American college football team

2009 Jacksonville Dolphins football
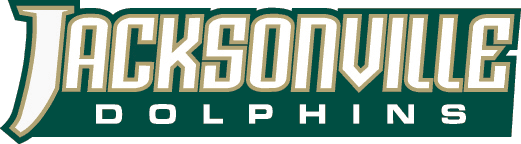
- Conference: Pioneer Football League
- Record: 7–4 (6–2 PFL)
- Head coach: Kerwin Bell (3rd season)
- Home stadium: D. B. Milne Field

2009 Pioneer Football League standings
	Conf.			Overall
Team	W		L	W		L
Butler +	7	–	1	11	–	1
Dayton +	7	–	1	9	–	2
Drake	6	–	2	8	–	3
Jacksonville	6	–	2	7	–	4
Marist	5	–	3	7	–	4
San Diego	3	–	5	4	–	7
Davidson	3	–	5	3	–	7
Campbell	2	–	6	3	–	8
Morehead State	1	–	7	3	–	8
Valparaiso	0	–	8	1	–	10
+ – Conference co-champions

The 2009 Jacksonville Dolphins football team represented Jacksonville University as a member of the Pioneer Football League (PFL) during the 2009 NCAA Division I FCS football season. The Dolphins were led by third-year head coach Kerwin Bell and played their home games at D. B. Milne Field in Jacksonville, Florida. They finished the season 7–4 overall and 6–2 in PFL play to tie for fourth place.

== Schedule ==
Date	Time	Opponent	Site	Result	Attendance	Source
September 5	5:00 p.m.	at Webber International*	Legions Field; Lake Wales, FL	W 40–24		
September 12	6:00 p.m.	at Samford*	Seibert Stadium; Homewood, AL	L 0–27	5,328	
September 19	1:00 p.m.	Old Dominion*	D. B. Milne Field; Jacksonville, FL	L 27–28	5,023	
October 3	1:00 p.m.	Davidson	D. B. Milne Field; Jacksonville, FL	W 27–21	3,589	
October 10	1:00 p.m.	at Marist	Leonidoff Field; Poughkeepsie, NY	L 27–31	3,089	
October 17	1:00 p.m.	Morehead State	D. B. Milne Field; Jacksonville, FL	W 39–0	3,865	
October 24	4:30 p.m.	San Diego	Torero Stadium; San Diego, CA	W 34–16	2,583	
October 31	2:00 p.m.	at Drake	Drake Stadium; Des Moines, IA	L 38–45	1,121	
November 7	1:00 p.m.	Valparaiso^{†}	D. B. Milne Field; Jacksonville, FL	W 49–20	1,972	
November 14	12:00 p.m.	Butler	D. B. Milne Field; Jacksonville, FL	W 36–7	1,933	
November 21	1:00 p.m.	at Campbell	Barker-Lane Stadium; Buies Creek, NC	W 34–14	2,510	
*Non-conference game; ^{†}Homecoming; All times are in Eastern time
