= 2009 Dayton Flyers football team =

American college football season

2009 Dayton Flyers football
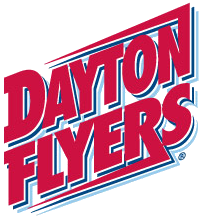

PFL co-champion
- Conference: Pioneer Football League
- Record: 9–2 (7–1 PFL)
- Head coach: Rick Chamberlin (2nd season)
- Offensive coordinator: Dave Whilding (27th season)
- Home stadium: Welcome Stadium

2009 Pioneer Football League standings
	Conf.			Overall
Team	W		L	W		L
Butler +	7	–	1	11	–	1
Dayton +	7	–	1	9	–	2
Drake	6	–	2	8	–	3
Jacksonville	6	–	2	7	–	4
Marist	5	–	3	7	–	4
San Diego	3	–	5	4	–	7
Davidson	3	–	5	3	–	7
Campbell	2	–	6	3	–	8
Morehead State	1	–	7	3	–	8
Valparaiso	0	–	8	1	–	10
+ – Conference co-champions

The 2009 Dayton Flyers football team represented the University of Dayton as a member of the Pioneer Football League (PFL) during the 2009 NCAA Division I FCS football season. Led by second-year head coach Rick Chamberlin, the Flyers compiled an overall record of 9–2 with a mark of 7–1 in conference play, sharing the PFL title with Butler. Dayton played home games at Welcome Stadium in Dayton, Ohio.

== Schedule ==
Date	Time	Opponent	Site	Result	Attendance
September 12	1:00 p.m.	Urbana*	Welcome Stadium; Dayton, OH	L 10–13	3,566
September 19	12:00 p.m.	at Robert Morris*	Joe Walton Stadium; Moon Township, PA	W 21–14	2,455
September 26	1:00 p.m.	Duquesne*	Welcome Stadium; Dayton, OH	W 24–17	5,153
October 3	7:00 p.m.	at Morehead State	Jayne Stadium; Morehead, KY	W 30–15	4,817
October 10	1:00 p.m.	at Campbell	Barker–Lane Stadium; Buies Creek, NC	W 35–17	2,540
October 17	1:00 p.m.	Davidson	Welcome Stadium; Dayton, OH	W 17–0	5,069
October 24	1:00 p.m.	at Valparaiso	Brown Field; Valparaiso, IN	W 38–7	1,189
October 31	1:00 pm	San Diego	Welcome Stadium; Dayton, OH	W 21–14	3,471
November 7	1:00 p.m.	Butler	Welcome Stadium; Dayton, OH	L 28–31	4,012
November 14	1:00 p.m.	Drake	Drake Stadium; Des Moines, IA (rivalry)	W 23–6	2,541
November 21	12:00 p.m.	Marist	Welcome Stadium; Dayton, OH	W 27–16	2,594
*Non-conference game; All times are in Eastern time
