= 2009 Lenoir–Rhyne Bears football team =

American college football season

2009 Lenoir–Rhyne Bears football
- Conference: South Atlantic Conference
- Record: 5–6 (2–5 SAC)
- Head coach: Fred Goldsmith (3rd season)
- Offensive coordinator: Tommy Laurendine (2nd season)
- Defensive coordinator: Mike Houston (3rd season)
- Home stadium: Moretz Stadium

2009 South Atlantic Conference football standings
	Conf.			Overall
Team	W		L	W		L
No. 4 Carson–Newman $^	7	–	0	11	–	3
Wingate	5	–	2	7	–	3
Mars Hill	4	–	3	6	–	4
Newberry	4	–	3	6	–	4
Brevard	3	–	4	7	–	4
Lenoir–Rhyne	2	–	5	5	–	6
Tusculum	2	–	5	3	–	7
Catawba	1	–	6	4	–	6
$ – Conference champion; ^ – NCAA Division II playoff participant; Rankings from AFCA poll

The 2009 Lenoir–Rhyne Bears football team represented Lenoir–Rhyne University in the 2009 NCAA Division II football season. The Bears offense scored 293 points while the defense allowed 241 points.

== Schedule ==
Date	Time	Opponent	Site	Result	Attendance
August 29		Shorter*	Moretz Stadium; Hickory, NC	W 21–14	5,126
September 5		at Concord*	Callaghan Stadium; Athens, WV	L 45–52 ^{OT}	1,818
September 12	1:00 p.m.	at Davidson*	Richardson Stadium; Davidson, NC	W 42–0	4,177
September 19		North Greenville*	Moretz Stadium; Hickory, NC	W 32–16	4,606
September 26		Brevard	Moretz Stadium; Hickory, NC	L 9–14	1,491
October 3		at Tusculum	Pioneer Field; Tusculum, TN	W 38–17	1,830
October 10		Wingate	Moretz Stadium; Hickory, NC	L 49–50	6,107
October 17		No. 25 Carson–Newman	Moretz Stadium; Hickory, NC	L 13–17	2,761
October 24		at Mars Hill	Meares Stadium; Mars Hill, NC	L 7–24	3,788
October 31		Newberry	Moretz Stadium; Hickory, NC	L 21–24	2,798
November 7		at Catawba	Shuford Stadium; Salisbury, NC	W 16–13	2,081
*Non-conference game; Rankings from Coaches' Poll released prior to the game; All times are in Eastern time
