= 2009 Butler Bulldogs football team =

American college football season

2009 Butler Bulldogs football
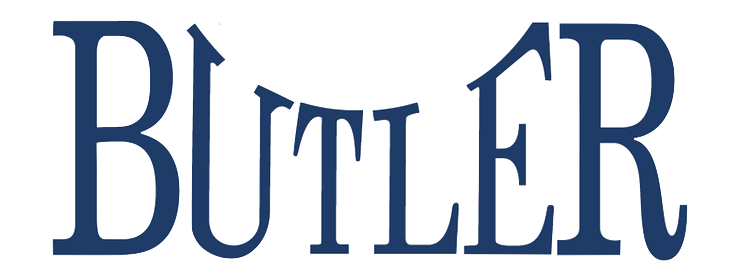

PFL co-champion

Gridiron Classic, W 28–23 vs Central Connecticut
- Conference: Pioneer Football League
- Record: 11–1 (7–1 PFL)
- Head coach: Jeff Voris (4th season)
- Home stadium: Butler Bowl

2009 Pioneer Football League standings
	Conf.			Overall
Team	W		L	W		L
Butler +	7	–	1	11	–	1
Dayton +	7	–	1	9	–	2
Drake	6	–	2	8	–	3
Jacksonville	6	–	2	7	–	4
Marist	5	–	3	7	–	4
San Diego	3	–	5	4	–	7
Davidson	3	–	5	3	–	7
Campbell	2	–	6	3	–	8
Morehead State	1	–	7	3	–	8
Valparaiso	0	–	8	1	–	10
+ – Conference co-champions

The 2009 Butler Bulldogs football team represented Butler University as a member of the Pioneer Football League (PFL) during the 2009 NCAA Division I FCS football season. Led by fifth-year head coach Jeff Voris, Bulldogs compiled an overall record of 11–1 with a mark of 7–1 in conference play, sharing the PFL title with Dayton. Butler representend the PFL in the Gridiron Classic, defeating Central Connecticut State, champion of the Northeast Conference (NEC). The Bulldogs played home games at the Butler Bowl in Indianapolis.

== Schedule ==
Date	Time	Opponent	Site	Result	Attendance	Source
September 5	1:00 pm	Albion*	Butler Bowl; Indianapolis, IN	W 42–3	1,613	
September 12	1:30 pm	at Franklin*	Faught Stadium; Franklin, IN	W 49–19	2,500	
September 19	1:00 pm	Hanover*	Butler Bowl; Indianapolis, IN	W 42–21	2,215	
September 26	1:00 pm	at Morehead State	Jayne Stadium; Morehead, KY	W 28–21 ^{OT}		
October 3	1:00 pm	San Diego	Butler Bowl; Indianapolis, IN	W 25–24	1,674	
October 17	1:00 pm	Valparaiso	Butler Bowl; Indianapolis, IN (Hoosier Helmet Trophy)	W 23–14		
October 24	12:00 pm	at Campbell	Barker–Lane Stadium; Buies Creek, NC	W 23–16	4,851	
October 31	12:00 pm	Davidson	Butler Bowl; Indianapolis, IN	W 14–7	2,568	
November 7	1:00 pm	at Dayton	Welcome Stadium; Dayton, OH	W 31–28	4,012	
November 14	12:00 pm	at Jacksonville	D. B. Milne Field; Jacksonville, FL	L 7–36	1,933	
November 21	1:00 pm	Drake	Butler Bowl; Indianapolis, IN	W 20–17		
December 5	12:00 pm	Central Connecticut*	Butler Bowl; Indianapolis, IN (Gridiron Classic)	W 28–23	1,577	
*Non-conference game; All times are in Eastern time
