= Jeff Voris =

American football player and coach (born 1967)

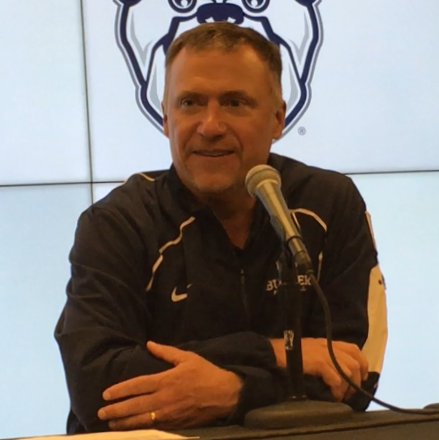

Biographical details
- Born: August 27, 1967 (age 59); Aurora, Illinois, U.S.

Playing career
- 1986–1989: DePauw
- Position: Quarterback

Coaching career (HC unless noted)
- 1990–1991: Illinois (GA)
- 1992–1993: Texas (GA)
- 1994–1995: DePauw (OC)
- 1996–1999: DePauw (OC/QB)
- 2000: Edinboro (OC/QB)
- 2001–2005: Carroll (WI)
- 2006–2021: Butler

Head coaching record
- Overall: 95–129
- Tournaments: 0–1 (NCAA D-I FCS playoffs)

Accomplishments and honors

Championships
- 3 PFL (2009, 2012–2013)

Awards
- 2× PFL Coach of the Year (2009, 2012)

Jeff Voris (born August 27, 1967) is an American college football coach and former player. He was most recently the head football coach at Butler University, a position he had held since the 2006 season, through the 2021 season. Voris served as the head football coach at Carroll College in Waukesha, Wisconsin from 2001 to 2005. He played as quarterback at DePauw University from 1986 to 1989.

== Playing career ==
Voris was a four-year starting quarterback at DePauw University from 1986 through 1989 and earned honorable mention All-America recognition in 1988 and 1989. As of 2007, he still holds DePauw career football records for most passing yards (6,035), most touchdown passes (56), most pass completions (504), most pass attempts (910) and most total offense (5,754).

His other accomplishments on the field at DePauw include single game records with 38 completions against Findlay in 1987 and five touchdown passes against Taylor in 1988, and he's the only player in DePauw football history to lead the Tigers in passing for four consecutive seasons. While at DePauw he joined Delta Tau Delta International Fraternity.

== Coaching career ==
=== Carroll ===
Voris' first head football coaching position was as the 27th head football coach at Carroll College in Waukesha, Wisconsin, serving for five seasons, from 2001 to 2005, and compiling 15–34.

=== Butler ===
From 2006 to 2021 Voris was the head coach at Butler University.

The Bulldogs won the 2009 Pioneer Football League title by compiling a 7–1 league record and a 10–1 regular season overall. The conference title run included a come-from-behind 25–24 victory over Pioneer League preseason favorite San Diego, a 31–28 road win at Dayton (who also finished with a 7–1 league record), and a 20–17 title-clinching victory over Drake.

The Pioneer Football League title earned the Bulldogs a berth in the last Gridiron Classic. It was Butler's first postseason appearance since 1991, when they were still an NCAA Division II program. Butler defeated Central Connecticut State 28–23 to win the Gridiron Classic and finish 11–1.

== Head coaching record ==
Year	Team	Overall	Conference	Standing	Bowl/playoffs
Carroll Pioneers (Midwest Conference) (2001–2005)
2001	Carroll	2–7	2–6	T–7th	
2002	Carroll	1–9	1–8	9th	
2003	Carroll	3–7	3–6	T–5th	
2004	Carroll	3–7	3–6	7th	
2005	Carroll	6–4	6–3	3rd	
Carroll:		15–34	15–29		
Butler Bulldogs (Pioneer Football League) (2006–2021)
2006	Butler	3–8	2–5	T–5th	
2007	Butler	4–7	0–7	8th	
2008	Butler	6–5	4–4	T–4th	
2009	Butler	11–1	7–1	T–1st	W Gridiron Classic
2010	Butler	4–7	2–6	T–7th	
2011	Butler	5–6	3–5	T–6th	
2012	Butler	8–3	7–1	T–1st	
2013	Butler	9–4	7–1	T–1st	L NCAA Division I First Round
2014	Butler	4–7	2–6	T–9th	
2015	Butler	6–5	4–4	T–4th	
2016	Butler	4–7	2–6	T–9th	
2017	Butler	6–5	4–4	T–6th	
2018	Butler	4–7	2–6	T–7th	
2019	Butler	3–9	2–6	8th	
2020–21	Butler	0–6	0–6	7th	
2021	Butler	3–8	1–7	T–9th	
Butler:		80–95	49–75		
Total:		95–129			
National championship Conference title Conference division title or championship game berth
