= 2012 Valparaiso Crusaders football team =

American college football season

2012 Valparaiso Crusaders football
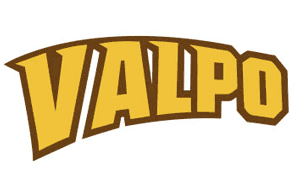
- Conference: Pioneer Football League
- Record: 1–10 (1–7 PFL)
- Head coach: Dale Carlson (3rd season)
- Offensive coordinator: Bob Muckian
- Defensive coordinator: Tyson Silveus
- Home stadium: Brown Field

2012 Pioneer Football League standings
	Conf.			Overall
Team	W		L	W		L
Butler +	7	–	1	8	–	3
Drake +	7	–	1	8	–	3
San Diego +	7	–	1	8	–	3
Jacksonville	5	–	3	7	–	4
Dayton	5	–	3	6	–	5
Marist	3	–	5	4	–	7
Morehead State	3	–	5	4	–	7
Davidson	2	–	6	2	–	9
Valparaiso	1	–	7	1	–	10
Campbell	0	–	8	1	–	10
+ – Conference co-champions

The 2012 Valparaiso Crusaders football team represented Valparaiso University in the 2012 NCAA Division I FCS football season. They were led by third-year head coach Dale Carlson and played their home games at Brown Field. They are a member of the Pioneer Football League. They finished the season 1–10, 1–7 in PFL play to finish in ninth place.

== Schedule ==
Date	Time	Opponent	Site	Result	Attendance
August 30	7:00 pm	Saint Joseph's (IN)*	Brown Field; Valparaiso, IN	L 34–36	3,848
September 8	3:00 pm	at No. 6 Youngstown State*	Stambaugh Stadium; Youngstown, OH	L 0–59	15,347
September 15	1:00 pm	Duquesne*	Brown Field; Valparaiso, IN	L 17–45	2,177
September 22	3:00 pm	at San Diego	Torero Stadium; San Diego, CA	L 14–51	2,084
October 6	1:00 pm	Butler	Brown Field; Valparaiso, IN (Hoosier Helmet Trophy)	L 17–56	3,676
October 13	1:00 pm	Drake	Brown Field; Valparaiso, IN	L 21–35	1,189
October 20	12:00 pm	at Dayton	Welcome Stadium; Dayton, OH	L 0–45	5,077
October 27	1:00 pm	Marist	Brown Field; Valparaiso, IN	L 7–44	1,333
November 3	1:00 pm	at Campbell	Barker–Lane Stadium; Buies Creek, NC	W 41–21	2,640
November 10	1:00 pm	Davidson	Brown Field; Valparaiso, IN	L 27–28 ^{OT}	1,827
November 17	12:00 pm	at Morehead State	Jayne Stadium; Morehead, KY	L 24–76	1,607
*Non-conference game; Rankings from The Sports Network FCS Poll released prior to game Poll released prior to the game; All times are in Eastern time

- Source: Schedule

== Awards ==
- #22 Alex Grask S JR: Team's Most Valuable Player, Academic All PFL
- #49 Jake Hutson RB RSFR: Team's Offensive Player of the Year, PFL Offensive Freshman of the Year (Coaches, All PFL Honorable Mention (Coaches), PFL Freshman of the Year (College Sports Madness, All PFL 2nd Team (College Sports Madness)
- #88 Greg Wood P SR: Team's Special Team Player of the Year, All PFL 1st Team ( Coaches), All PFL 1st Team (College Sports Madness)
- #71 Sam Manternach OL FR: Team's Offensive Rookie of the Year
- #60 John Guilford DL FR: Team's Defensive Rookie of the Year, All PFL Honorable Mention
- #3 Erik Slenk WR SR: Crusader Special Team Effort Award
- #89 Austin Etzler WR FR: Offensive Scout Team Player of the Year
- #36 Tevin Johnson LB FR: Defensive Scout Team Player of the Year
- #83 Mike Gerton TE SR: Richard P. Koenig Award
- #38 Chris Howard DL RSSR: Joe Sever Trophy
- #75 Stuart Barkley OL SO: All PFL Honorable Mention (Coaches, Academic All PFL
- #35 Cody Gokan LB RSSR: All PFL Honorable Mention (Coaches)
- #24 Pat Derbak LB JR: All PFL Honorable Mention (Coaches, All PFL 3rd Team (College Sports Madness)
- #57 Bill Bodzianowski OL RSJR: All PFL 3rd Team (College Sports Madness)
- #70 Matt Scroll OL SR: Academic All PFL
