= 2008 Jacksonville Dolphins football team =

American college football season

2008 Jacksonville Dolphins football
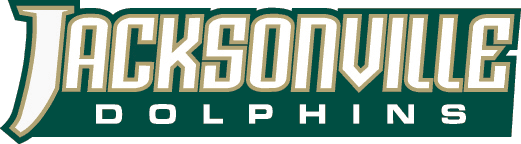

PFL champion

Gridiron Classic, L 0–28 at Albany
- Conference: Pioneer Football League
- Record: 9–4 (7–1 PFL)
- Head coach: Kerwin Bell (2nd season)
- Home stadium: D. B. Milne Field

2008 Pioneer Football League standings
	Conf.			Overall
Team	W		L	W		L
Jacksonville $	7	–	1	9	–	4
San Diego	6	–	2	9	–	2
Dayton	6	–	2	9	–	3
Butler	4	–	4	6	–	5
Drake	4	–	4	6	–	5
Morehead State	4	–	4	6	–	6
Davidson	3	–	5	4	–	7
Valparaiso	2	–	6	3	–	8
Campbell	0	–	8	1	–	10
$ – Conference champion

The 2008 Jacksonville Dolphins football team represented Jacksonville University as a member of the Pioneer Football League (PFL) during the 2008 NCAA Division I FCS football season. The Dolphins were led by second-year head coach Kerwin Bell and played their home games at D. B. Milne Field in Jacksonville, Florida. They finished the season 9–4 overall and 7–1 in PFL play to win the PFL. Jacksonville represented the PFL in the Gridiron Classic, losing to Albany, champion of the Northeast Conference (NEC).

== Schedule ==
Date	Time	Opponent	Site	TV	Result	Attendance	Source
August 30	7:00 pm	at Savannah State*	Memorial Stadium; Savannah, GA		W 20–7	4,441	
September 6	3:30 pm	at No. 1 Appalachian State*	Kidd Brewer Stadium; Boone, NC		L 7–56	30,718	
September 13	1:00 pm	Campbell	D. B. Milne Field; Jacksonville, FL		W 52–0	2,476	
September 20	1:00 pm	at UNC Pembroke*	Grace P. Johnson Stadium; Pembroke, NC		L 21–22	3,578	
September 27	1:00 pm	at Davidson	Richardson Stadium; Davidson, NC		L 35–38	4,218	
October 9	6:00 pm	Webber International*	D. B. Milne Field; Jacksonville, FL		W 51–7	4,148	
October 18	1:00 pm	at Morehead State	Jayne Stadium; Morehead, KY		W 40–9	7,810	
October 25	1:00 pm	San Diego	D. B. Milne Field; Jacksonville, FL		W 30–29	1,269	
November 1	1:00 pm	at Butler	Butler Bowl; Indianapolis, IN		W 45–9	1,696	
November 8	1:00 pm	at Valparaiso	Field Stadium; Valparaiso, IN		W 40–24	1,192	
November 15	1:00 pm	Drake	D. B. Milne Field; Jacksonville, FL		W 41–9	2,104	
November 22	1:00 pm	Dayton	D. B. Milne Field; Jacksonville, FL		W 19–14	5,263	
December 6	1:30 pm	at Albany*	University Field; Albany, NY (Gridiron Classic)	YES Network	L 0–28	2,264	
*Non-conference game; Rankings from Coaches' Poll released prior to the game; All times are in Eastern time
