= 2012 San Diego Toreros football team =

American college football season

2012 San Diego Toreros football

PFL co-champion
- Conference: Pioneer Football League
- Record: 8–3 (7–1 PFL)
- Head coach: Ron Caragher (6th season)
- Offensive coordinator: Tanner Engstrand (2nd season)
- Defensive coordinator: Dale Lindsey (1st season)
- Home stadium: Torero Stadium

2012 Pioneer Football League standings
	Conf.			Overall
Team	W		L	W		L
Butler +	7	–	1	8	–	3
Drake +	7	–	1	8	–	3
San Diego +	7	–	1	8	–	3
Jacksonville	5	–	3	7	–	4
Dayton	5	–	3	6	–	5
Marist	3	–	5	4	–	7
Morehead State	3	–	5	4	–	7
Davidson	2	–	6	2	–	9
Valparaiso	1	–	7	1	–	10
Campbell	0	–	8	1	–	10
+ – Conference co-champions

The 2012 San Diego Toreros football team represented the University of San Diego as a member of the Pioneer Football League (PFL) during the 2012 NCAA Division I FCS football season. Led by Ron Caragher in his sixth and final season as head coach, the Toreros compiled an overall record of 8–3 with a mark of 7–1 in conference play, sharing the PFL title with Butler and Drake. The team played home games at Torero Stadium in San Diego.

Caragher resigned at the end of the season to take the position as head coach at San Jose State. On December 28, defensive coordinator Dale Lindsey was named to succeed him.

== Schedule ==
Date	Time	Opponent	Site	Result	Attendance
September 1	4:00 pm	at Cal Poly*	Alex G. Spanos Stadium; San Luis Obispo, CA	L 14–41	6,022
September 8	6:00 pm	Western New Mexico*	Torero Stadium; San Diego, CA	W 34–27	4,081
September 15	9:30 am	at Harvard*	Harvard Stadium; Boston, MA	L 13–28	5,272
September 22	1:00 pm	Valparaiso	Torero Stadium; San Diego, CA	W 51–14	2,084
October 6	11:00 am	at Drake	Drake Stadium; Indianapolis, IN	L 10–38	3,154
October 13	2:00 pm	Campbell	Torero Stadium; San Diego, CA	W 44–0	3,417
October 20	10:00 am	at Jacksonville	D. B. Milne Field; Jacksonville, FL	W 24–7	2,270
October 27	6:00 pm	Dayton	Torero Stadium; San Diego, CA	W 41–9	2,264
November 3	1:00 pm	at Marist	Tenney Stadium at Leonidoff Field; Poughkeepsie, NY	Postponed	
November 10	6:00 pm	Morehead State	Torero Stadium; San Diego, CA	W 41–28	2,735
November 17	10:00 am	at Davidson	Richardson Stadium; Davidson, NC	W 17–10	3,712
December 1	9:00 am	at Marist	Tenney Stadium at Leonidoff Field; Poughkeepsie, NY	W 34–10	1,066
*Non-conference game; All times are in Pacific time

November 3's game against Marist was postponed due to effects from Hurricane Sandy. The Game was rescheduled to December 1.
