= 2012 Jacksonville Dolphins football team =

American college football season

2012 Jacksonville Dolphins football
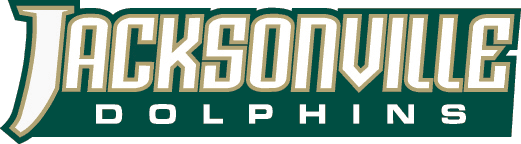
- Conference: Pioneer Football League
- Record: 7–4 (5–3 PFL)
- Head coach: Kerwin Bell (6th season)
- Offensive coordinator: Andy McLeod
- Defensive coordinator: Jerry Odom (3rd season)
- Home stadium: D. B. Milne Field

2012 Pioneer Football League standings
	Conf.			Overall
Team	W		L	W		L
Butler +	7	–	1	8	–	3
Drake +	7	–	1	8	–	3
San Diego +	7	–	1	8	–	3
Jacksonville	5	–	3	7	–	4
Dayton	5	–	3	6	–	5
Marist	3	–	5	4	–	7
Morehead State	3	–	5	4	–	7
Davidson	2	–	6	2	–	9
Valparaiso	1	–	7	1	–	10
Campbell	0	–	8	1	–	10
+ – Conference co-champions

The 2012 Jacksonville Dolphins football team represented Jacksonville University in the 2012 NCAA Division I FCS football season. They were led by sixth-year head coach Kerwin Bell and played their home games at D. B. Milne Field. They are a member of the Pioneer Football League. They finished the season 7–4, 5–3 in PFL play to finish in a tie for fourth place.

== Schedule ==
Date	Time	Opponent	Site	TV	Result	Attendance
September 1	6:00 p.m.	at No. 3 Georgia Southern*	Paulson Stadium; Statesboro, GA		L 0–58	20,132
September 8	1:30 p.m.	at Charleston Southern*	Buccaneer Field; Charleston, SC		W 31–10	2,136
September 15	1:00 p.m.	Webber International*	D. B. Milne Field; Jacksonville, FL	WCWJ	W 33–10	2,725
September 22	1:00 p.m.	at Dayton	Welcome Stadium; Dayton, OH		W 21–17	2,523
September 29	1:00 p.m.	Marist^{†}	D. B. Milne Field; Jacksonville, FL	WCWJ	W 26–14	3,323
October 6	1:00 p.m.	at Morehead State	Jayne Stadium; Morehead, KY		W 38–17	3,817
October 13	1:00 p.m.	at Davidson	Richardson Stadium; Davidson, NC		W 34–24	1,924
October 20	1:00 p.m.	San Diego	D. B. Milne Field; Jacksonville, FL	WCWJ	L 7–24	2,270
November 3	1:00 p.m.	at Butler	Butler Bowl; Indianapolis, IN		L 16–19	2,567
November 10	12:00 p.m.	Campbell	D. B. Milne Field; Jacksonville, FL	WCWJ	W 40–14	3,012
November 17	12:00 p.m.	Drake	D. B. Milne Field; Jacksonville, FL	WCWJ	L 29–32	2,012
*Non-conference game; ^{†}Homecoming; Rankings from The Sports Network FCS Poll released prior to game Poll released prior to the game; All times are in Eastern time

- Source: Schedule
