= 2012 Butler Bulldogs football team =

American college football season

2012 Butler Bulldogs football
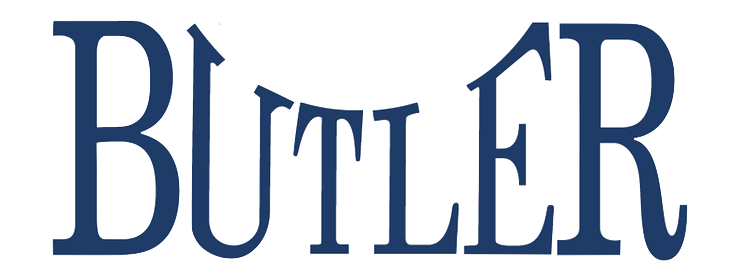
- Conference: Pioneer Football League
- Record: 8–3 (7–1 PFL)
- Head coach: Jeff Voris (7th season)
- Offensive coordinator: Nick Tabacca (2nd season)
- Co-defensive coordinators: Joe Cheshire (3rd season); Tim Cooper (3rd season)
- Home stadium: Butler Bowl

2012 Pioneer Football League standings
	Conf.			Overall
Team	W		L	W		L
Butler +	7	–	1	8	–	3
Drake +	7	–	1	8	–	3
San Diego +	7	–	1	8	–	3
Jacksonville	5	–	3	7	–	4
Dayton	5	–	3	6	–	5
Marist	3	–	5	4	–	7
Morehead State	3	–	5	4	–	7
Davidson	2	–	6	2	–	9
Valparaiso	1	–	7	1	–	10
Campbell	0	–	8	1	–	10
+ – Conference co-champions

The 2012 Butler Bulldogs football team represented Butler University as a member of the Pioneer Football League (PFL) during the 2012 NCAA Division I FCS football season. Led by seventh-year head coach Jeff Voris, Bulldogs compiled an overall record of 8–3 with a mark of 7–1 in conference play, sharing the PFL title with Drake and San Diego. Butler played home games at the Butler Bowl in Indianapolis.

== Schedule ==
Date	Time	Opponent	Site	Result	Attendance
August 30	7:00 pm	at Western Illinois*	Hanson Field; Macomb, IL	L 15–23	12,589
September 8	6:00 pm	Franklin (IN)*	Butler Bowl; Indianapolis, IN	W 42–13	4,148
September 15	7:00 pm	at Dartmouth*	Memorial Field; Hanover, NH	L 7–35	9,089
September 22	1:00 pm	Campbell	Butler Bowl; Indianapolis, IN	W 35–14	1,600
September 29	1:00 pm	Dayton	Butler Bowl; Indianapolis, IN	W 21–11	2,450
October 6	2:00 pm	at Valparaiso	Brown Field; Valparaiso, IN (Hoosier Helmet Trophy)	W 56–17	3,676
October 13	1:00 pm	at Marist	Tenney Stadium at Leonidoff Field; Poughkeepsie, NY	W 17–14	1,796
October 20	6:00 pm	Morehead State^{†}	Butler Bowl; Indianapolis, IN	W 39–35	4,037
October 27	12:00 pm	at Davidson	Richardson Stadium; Davidson, NC	W 31–20	3,362
November 3	12:00 pm	Jacksonville	Butler Bowl; Indianapolis, IN	W 19–16	2,567
November 10	2:00 pm	at Drake	Drake Stadium; Des Moines, IA	L 20–45	2,833
*Non-conference game; ^{†}Homecoming; All times are in Eastern time

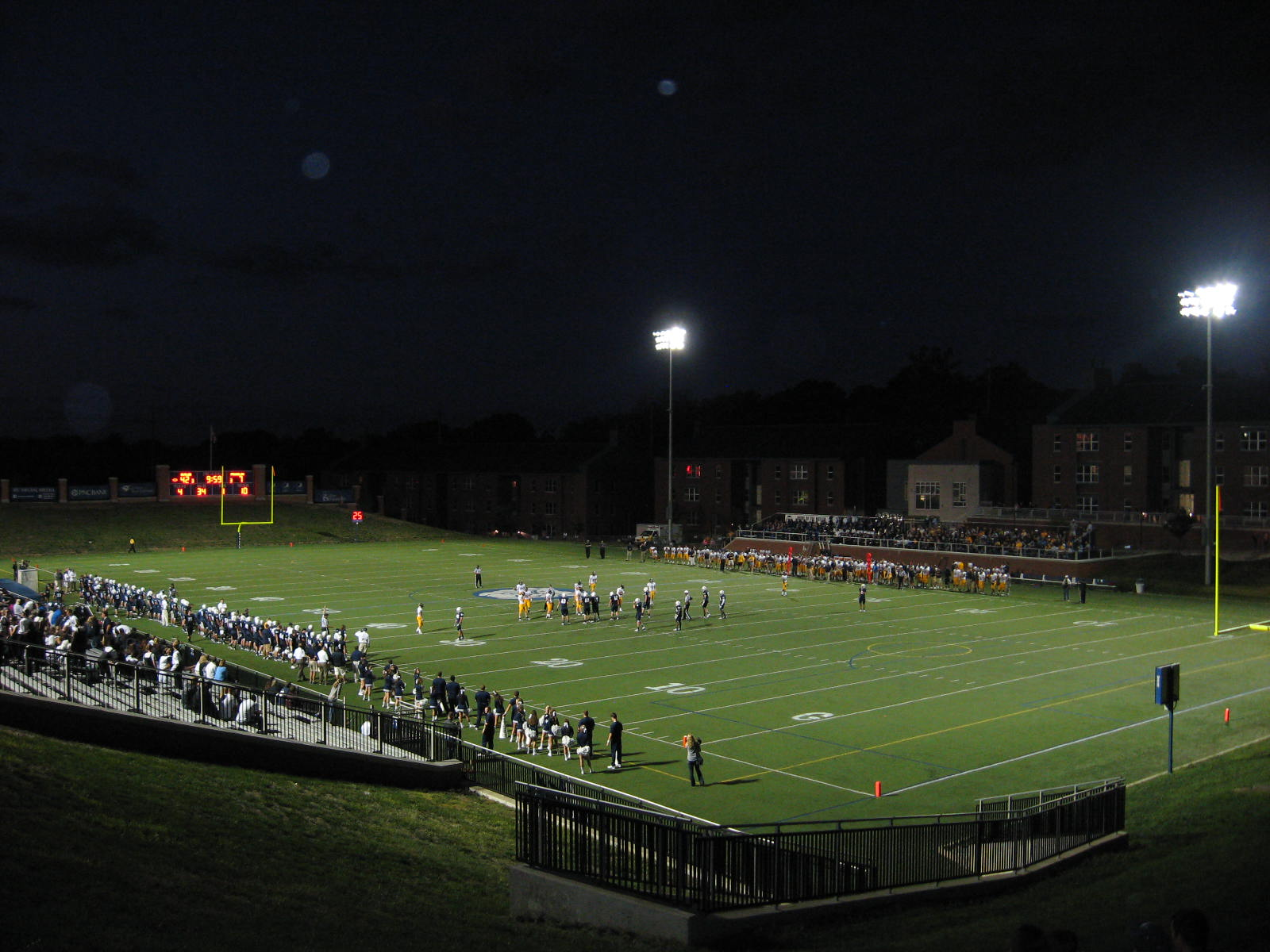
On September 18, 2012, Butler played a night game at the Butler Bowl for the first time in over 70 years. The Bulldogs defeated Franklin Grizzlies, 42–13
