= 2024 Campbell Fighting Camels football team =

American college football season

2024 Campbell Fighting Camels football
- Conference: CAA Football
- Record: 3–9 (1–7 CAA)
- Head coach: Braxton Harris (1st season)
- Offensive coordinator: Matt Kubik (1st season)
- Defensive coordinator: Eric Daniels (1st season)
- Home stadium: Barker–Lane Stadium

2024 Coastal Athletic Association Football Conference standings
	Conf.			Overall
Team	W		L	W		L
No. 15 Richmond +^	8	–	0	10	–	3
No. 9 Rhode Island* +^	7	–	1	11	–	3
No. 12 Villanova ^	6	–	2	10	–	4
Delaware*	6	–	2	9	–	2
No. 23 New Hampshire ^	6	–	2	8	–	5
Stony Brook	5	–	3	8	–	4
Towson	5	–	3	7	–	5
Elon	5	–	3	6	–	6
William & Mary	4	–	4	7	–	5
Monmouth	4	–	4	6	–	6
Maine	3	–	5	5	–	7
Albany	2	–	6	4	–	8
Hampton	2	–	6	5	–	7
Campbell	1	–	7	3	–	9
Bryant	0	–	8	2	–	10
North Carolina A&T	0	–	8	1	–	11
+ – Conference co-champions; ^ – FCS playoff participant; * Delaware ineligible for rankings and 2024 FCS playoffs due to transition to the FBS. Richmond and Rhode Island named co-champions as Rhode Island's only CAA loss was to Delaware.; Rankings from STATS Poll

The 2024 Campbell Fighting Camels football team represented Campbell University as a member of Coastal Athletic Association Football Conference (CAA) during the 2024 NCAA Division I FCS football season. The Fighting Camels were led by first-year head coach Braxton Harris, and played home games at Barker–Lane Stadium in Buies Creek, North Carolina.

== Schedule ==
Date	Time	Opponent	Site	TV	Result	Attendance
August 31	6:00 p.m.	at Liberty*	Williams Stadium; Lynchburg, VA	ESPN+	L 24–41	21,573
September 7	1:00 p.m.	at No. 17 Western Carolina*	E.J. Whitmire Stadium; Cullowhee, NC	ESPN+	W 24–16	12,506
September 14	6:00 p.m.	at Rhode Island	Meade Stadium; Kingston, RI	FloSports	L 9–21	4,840
September 21	5:00 p.m.	Stony Brook	Barker-Lane Stadium; Buies Creek, NC	FloSports	L 17–24	4,023
September 28	2:00 p.m.	Delaware State*	Barker–Lane Stadium; Buies Creek, NC	FloSports	W 44–41	3,269
October 5	4:00 p.m.	North Carolina Central*	Barker–Lane Stadium; Buies Creek, NC	FloSports	L 14–45	4,415
October 19	3:30 p.m.	at No. 15 William & Mary	Zable Stadium; Williamsburg, VA	FloSports	L 28–35	12,138
October 26	4:00 p.m.	North Carolina A&T^{†}	Barker–Lane Stadium; Buies Creek, NC	FloSports	W 21–7	5,591
November 2	2:00 p.m.	at Elon	Rhodes Stadium; Elon, NC	FloSports	L 27–50	7,583
November 9	3:30 p.m.	No. 13 Richmond	Barker–Lane Stadium; Buies Creek, NC	FloSports	L 24–27	3,371
November 16	1:00 p.m.	at Delaware	Delaware Stadium; Newark, DE	FloSports	L 22–41	16,422
November 23	2:00 p.m.	Towson	Barker–Lane Stadium; Buies Creek, NC	FloSports	L 23–45	3,410
*Non-conference game; ^{†}Homecoming; Rankings from STATS Poll released prior to the game; All times are in Eastern time

== Game summaries ==
=== at Liberty (FBS) ===
Game One – Campbell Fighting Camels (0–0) at Liberty Flames (FBS) (0–0) – Game summary

Quarter	1	2	3	4	Total
Fighting Camels	3	7	7	7	24
Flames (FBS)	7	10	10	14	41

at Williams Stadium • Lynchburg, Virginia

- Date: August 31, 2024
- Game time: 6:00 p.m.
- Game weather: Cloudy • Temperature: 81 °F (27 °C) • Wind: S 8 miles per hour (13 km/h)
- Game attendance: 21,573
- Referee: Douglas Mercer
- TV announcers (ESPN+): Matt Warner (play-by-play), Joe Jauch (analyst) and Emily Austen (sideline)

Game information

First quarter

- (11:22) LIB – Quinton Cooley 6-yard run, Colin Karhu kick (Drive: 4 plays, 16 yards, 1:28; Liberty 7–0)
- (8:54) CAMP – Connor Lytton 27-yard field goal (Drive: 6 plays, 65 yards, 2:28; Liberty 7–3)

Second quarter

- (11:33) CAMP – Sincere Brown 36-yard pass from Chad Mascoe, Connor Lytton kick (Drive: 4 plays, 52 yards, 1:37; Campbell 10–7)
- (4:14) LIB – Colin Karhu 25-yard field goal (Drive: 14 plays, 79 yards, 7:10; Tied 10–10)
- (1:04) LIB – Treon Sibley 70-yard pass from Kaidon Salter, Colin Karhu kick (Drive: 3 plays, 82 yards, 0:29; Liberty 17–10)

Third quarter

- (8:54) LIB – Bentley Hanshaw 2-yard pass from Kaidon Salter, Colin Karhu kick (Drive: 11 plays, 58 yards, 6:00; Liberty 24–10)
- (4:37) LIB – Colin Karhu 34-yard field goal (Drive: 5 plays, 49 yards, 1:58; Liberty 27–10)
- (3:04) CAMP – Mark Biggins 1-yard run, Connor Lytton kick (Drive: 3 plays, 88 yards, 1:32; Liberty 27–17)

Fourth quarter

- (8:22) LIB – Billy Lucas 5-yard run, Colin Karhu kick (Drive: 14 plays, 92 yards, 6:23; Liberty 34–17)
- (4:10) LIB – Ryan Burger 6-yard run, Colin Karhu kick (Drive: 7 plays, 63 yards, 3:00; Liberty 41–17)
- (1:56) CAMP – Allen Mitchell 2-yard run, Connor Lytton kick (Drive: 6 plays, 65 yards, 2:14; Liberty 41–24)

Statistics	CAM	LIB
First downs	13	28
Total yards	310	533
Rushing yards	116	279
Passing yards	194	254
Passing: Comp–Att–Int	11–18–0	18–26–0
Time of possession	23:58	36:02

Team	Category	Player	Statistics
Campbell	Passing	Chad Mascoe	10/17, 180 yards, TD
Campbell	Rushing	Mark Biggins	8 carries, 81 yards, TD
Campbell	Receiving	Sincere Brown	5 receptions, 126 yards, TD
Liberty	Passing	Kaidon Salter	16/23, 242 yards, 2 TD
Liberty	Rushing	Quinton Cooley	16 carries, 110 yards, TD
Liberty	Receiving	Treon Sibley	5 receptions, 109 yards, TD

=== at No. 17 Western Carolina ===
Game Two – Campbell Fighting Camels (0–1) at No. 17 Western Carolina Catamounts (0–1) – Game summary

Quarter	1	2	3	4	Total
Fighting Camels	0	0	0	0	0
No. 17 Catamounts	0	0	0	0	0

at Bob Waters Field at E. J. Whitmire Stadium • Cullowhee, North Carolina

- Date: September 7, 2024
- Game time: 2:30 p.m.
- TV: ESPN+

Game information

First quarter
Second quarter
Third quarter
Fourth quarter

Statistics	CAM	WCU
First downs		
Total yards		
Rushing yards		
Passing yards		
Passing: Comp–Att–Int		
Time of possession		

Team	Category	Player	Statistics
Campbell	Passing		
Campbell	Rushing		
Campbell	Receiving		
Western Carolina	Passing		
Western Carolina	Rushing		
Western Carolina	Receiving		

=== at Rhode Island ===
Game Three – Campbell Fighting Camels (1–1) at Rhode Island Rams (1–1) – Game summary

Quarter	1	2	3	4	Total
Fighting Camels	0	0	0	0	0
Rams	0	0	0	0	0

at Meade Stadium • Kingston, Rhode Island

- Date: September 14, 2024
- Game time: 6:00 p.m.
- TV: FloSports

Game information

First quarter
Second quarter
Third quarter
Fourth quarter

Statistics	CAM	URI
First downs		
Total yards		
Rushing yards		
Passing yards		
Passing: Comp–Att–Int		
Time of possession		

Team	Category	Player	Statistics
Campbell	Passing		
Campbell	Rushing		
Campbell	Receiving		
Rhode Island	Passing		
Rhode Island	Rushing		
Rhode Island	Receiving		

=== Stony Brook ===
Game Four – Stony Brook Seawolves (2–1) vs Campbell Fighting Camels (1–2) – Game summary

Quarter	1	2	3	4	Total
Seawolves	14	7	0	3	24
Fighting Camels	0	7	7	3	17

at Barker-Lane Stadium, Buies Creek, NC

- Date: Saturday September 21, 2024
- Game time: 5:00 PM
- Game weather: Sunny • Temperature: 83 °F (28 °C) • Wind: NW at 5 miles per hour (8.0 km/h)
- Game attendance: 4,023
- Referee: Tom Zetts
- TV announcers (FloSports): Evan Budrovich (play-by-play) and Jay Sonnhalter (analyst)

Game information

First quarter

- (11:04) SBU – Roland Dempster 2-yard run, Enda Kirby kick (Drive: 11 plays, 75 yards, 3:56; Stony Brook 7–0)
- (10:23) SBU – Roland Dempster 3-yard run, Enda Kirby kick (Drive: 2 plays, 9 yards, 0:37; Stony Brook 14–0)

Second quarter

- (10:10) SBU – Johnny Martin III 1-yard run, Enda Kirby kick (Drive: 10 plays, 57 yards, 4:35; Stony Brook 21–0)
- (6:06) CAM – Aiden Valdez 5-yard pass from Mike Chandler II, Connor Lytton kick (Drive: 8 plays, 66 yards, 4:00; Stony Brook 21–7)

Third quarter

- (11:38) CAM – Aiden Valdez 37-yard pass from Chad Mascoe, Connor Lytton kick (Drive: 7 plays, 75 yards, 3:22; Stony Brook 21–14)

Fourth quarter

- (2:06) SBU – Enda Kirby 39-yard field goal (Drive: 10 plays, 53 yards, 4:51; Stony Brook 24–14)
- (0:31) CAM – Connor Lytton 30-yard field goal (Drive: 9 plays, 59 yards, 1:31; Stony Brook 24–17)

Statistics	STBK	CAM
First downs	24	18
Total yards	384	336
Rushing yards	227	158
Passing yards	157	178
Passing: Comp–Att–Int	13–31–0	12–22–0
Time of possession	36:39	23:21

Team	Category	Player	Statistics
Stony Brook	Passing	Malachi Marshall	13/30, 157 yards
Stony Brook	Rushing	Roland Dempster	36 carries, 179 yards, 2 TD
Stony Brook	Receiving	Cole Bunicci	2 receptions, 35 yards
Campbell	Passing	Chad Mascoe	9/14, 160 yards, TD
Campbell	Rushing	Allen Mitchell	5 carries, 46 yards
Campbell	Receiving	Sincere Brown	6 receptions, 63 yards

=== Delaware State ===
Game Five – Delaware State Hornets (1–3) vs Campbell Fighting Camels (1–3) – Game summary

Quarter	1	2	3	4	Total
Hornets	0	0	0	0	0
Fighting Camels	0	0	0	0	0

at Barker-Lane Stadium, Buies Creek, North Carolina

- Date: Saturday September 28, 2024
- Game time: 2:00 PM
- TV: FloSports

Game information

First quarter
Second quarter
Third quarter
Fourth quarter

Statistics	DSU	CAM
First downs		
Total yards		
Rushing yards		
Passing yards		
Passing: Comp–Att–Int		
Time of possession		

Team	Category	Player	Statistics
Delaware State	Passing		
Delaware State	Rushing		
Delaware State	Receiving		
Campbell	Passing		
Campbell	Rushing		
Campbell	Receiving		

=== North Carolina Central ===
Game Six – North Carolina Central Eagles (3–2) vs Campbell Fighting Camels (2–3) – Game summary

Quarter	1	2	3	4	Total
Eagles	0	0	0	0	0
Fighting Camels	0	0	0	0	0

at Barker-Lane Stadium, Buies Creek, North Carolina

- Date: Saturday October 5, 2024
- Game time: 4:00 PM
- TV: FloSports

Game information

First quarter
Second quarter
Third quarter
Fourth quarter

Statistics	NCCU	CAM
First downs		
Total yards		
Rushing yards		
Passing yards		
Passing: Comp–Att–Int		
Time of possession		

Team	Category	Player	Statistics
North Carolina Central	Passing		
North Carolina Central	Rushing		
North Carolina Central	Receiving		
Campbell	Passing		
Campbell	Rushing		
Campbell	Receiving		

=== at No. 15 William & Mary ===
Game Seven – Campbell Fighting Camels (2–4) vs No. 15 William & Mary Tribe (4–2) – Game summary

Quarter	1	2	3	4	Total
Fighting Camels	7	7	7	7	28
No. 15 Tribe	14	7	0	14	35

at Zable Stadium, Williamsburg, VA

- Date: Saturday October 19, 2024
- Game time: 3:30 PM
- TV: FloSports

Game information

First quarter
Second quarter
Third quarter
Fourth quarter

Statistics	CAM	W&M
First downs		
Total yards		
Rushing yards		
Passing yards		
Passing: Comp–Att–Int		
Time of possession		

Team	Category	Player	Statistics
Campbell	Passing		
Campbell	Rushing		
Campbell	Receiving		
William & Mary	Passing		
William & Mary	Rushing		
William & Mary	Receiving		

=== North Carolina A&T ===
Game Eight – North Carolina A&T Aggies (1–7) at Campbell Fighting Camels (2–6) – Game summary

Quarter	1	2	3	4	Total
Aggies	0	0	0	0	0
Fighting Camels	0	0	0	0	0

at Barker–Lane Stadium • Buies Creek, NC

- Date: Saturday, October 26, 2024
- Game time: 4:00 p.m.
- TV: FloSports

Game information

First quarter
Second quarter
Third quarter
Fourth quarter

Statistics	NCAT	CAM
First downs		
Total yards		
Rushing yards		
Passing yards		
Passing: Comp–Att–Int		
Time of possession		

Team	Category	Player	Statistics
North Carolina A&T	Passing		
North Carolina A&T	Rushing		
North Carolina A&T	Receiving		
Campbell	Passing		
Campbell	Rushing		
Campbell	Receiving		

=== at Elon ===
Game Nine – Campbell Fighting Camels (3–5) vs Elon Phoenix (2–6) – Game summary

Quarter	1	2	3	4	Total
Fighting Camels	0	0	0	0	0
Phoenix	0	0	0	0	0

at Rhodes Stadium, Elon, NC

- Date: Saturday November 2, 2024
- Game time: 2:00 p.m.
- TV: FloSports

Game information

First quarter
Second quarter
Third quarter
Fourth quarter

Statistics	CAMP	ELON
First downs		
Total yards		
Rushing yards		
Passing yards		
Passing: Comp–Att–Int		
Time of possession		

Team	Category	Player	Statistics
Campbell	Passing		
Campbell	Rushing		
Campbell	Receiving		
Elon	Passing		
Elon	Rushing		
Elon	Receiving		

=== No. 13 Richmond ===
Game Ten – No. 13 Richmond Spiders (7–2) at Campbell Fighting Camels (3–6) – Game summary

Quarter	1	2	3	4	Total
No. 13 Spiders	0	7	10	10	27
Fighting Camels	7	10	0	7	24

at Barker–Lane Stadium • Buies Creek, NC

- Date: Saturday November 9, 2024
- Game time: 3:30 p.m.
- Game weather: Sunny • Temperature: 70 °F (21 °C) • Wind: SW 10 mph
- Game attendance: 3,371
- TV: FloSports

Game information

First quarter
Second quarter
Third quarter
Fourth quarter

Statistics	RICH	CAM
First downs	25	18
Total yards	399	401
Rushing yards	147	273
Passing yards	252	128
Passing: Comp–Att–Int	19–33–1	12–24–2
Time of possession	30:59	29:01

Team	Category	Player	Statistics
Richmond	Passing	Camden Coleman	19–33, 252 yards, 2 TD
Richmond	Rushing	Camden Coleman	12 carries, 55 yards
Richmond	Receiving	Landon Ellis	7 receptions, 101 yards
Campbell	Passing	Mike Chandler II	12–24, 128 yards, TD
Campbell	Rushing	Mike Chandler II	17 carries, 121 yards, TD
Campbell	Receiving	Sincere Brown	7 receptions, 62 yards, TD

=== at Delaware ===
Game Eleven – Campbell Fighting Camels (3–7) vs Delaware Fightin' Blue Hens (8–1) – Game summary

Quarter	1	2	3	4	Total
Fighting Camels	0	0	0	0	0
Fightin' Blue Hens	0	0	0	0	0

at Delaware Stadium, Newark, DE

- Date: Saturday November 16, 2024
- Game time: 1:00 p.m.
- TV: FloSports

Game information

First quarter
Second quarter
Third quarter
Fourth quarter

Statistics	CAM	DEL
First downs		
Total yards		
Rushing yards		
Passing yards		
Passing: Comp–Att–Int		
Time of possession		

Team	Category	Player	Statistics
Campbell	Passing		
Campbell	Rushing		
Campbell	Receiving		
Delaware	Passing		
Delaware	Rushing		
Delaware	Receiving		

=== Towson ===
Game Twelve – Towson Tigers (0–0) at Campbell Fighting Camels (0–0) – Game summary

Quarter	1	2	3	4	Total
Tigers	0	0	0	0	0
Fighting Camels	0	0	0	0	0

at Barker–Lane Stadium • Buies Creek, NC

- Date: Saturday November 23, 2024
- Game time: 2:00 p.m.
- TV: FloSports

Game information

First quarter
Second quarter
Third quarter
Fourth quarter

Statistics	TOW	CAM
First downs		
Total yards		
Rushing yards		
Passing yards		
Passing: Comp–Att–Int		
Time of possession		

Team	Category	Player	Statistics
Towson	Passing		
Towson	Rushing		
Towson	Receiving		
Campbell	Passing		
Campbell	Rushing		
Campbell	Receiving		
