= 2012 Morehead State Eagles football team =

American college football season

2012 Morehead State Eagles football
- Conference: Pioneer Football League
- Record: 4–7 (3–5 PFL)
- Head coach: Matt Ballard (19th season)
- Offensive coordinator: Rob Tenyer (2nd season)
- Defensive coordinator: John Gilliam
- Home stadium: Jayne Stadium

2012 Pioneer Football League standings
	Conf.			Overall
Team	W		L	W		L
Butler +	7	–	1	8	–	3
Drake +	7	–	1	8	–	3
San Diego +	7	–	1	8	–	3
Jacksonville	5	–	3	7	–	4
Dayton	5	–	3	6	–	5
Marist	3	–	5	4	–	7
Morehead State	3	–	5	4	–	7
Davidson	2	–	6	2	–	9
Valparaiso	1	–	7	1	–	10
Campbell	0	–	8	1	–	10
+ – Conference co-champions

The 2012 Morehead State Eagles football team represented Morehead State University in the 2012 NCAA Division I FCS football season. The Eagles, a member of the Pioneer Football League, played their 49th season at Jayne Stadium on the university campus. They were led by Matt Ballard, who was in his 19th and final season as head coach. Following a 4–7 season, Ballard was fired.

== Schedule ==
Date	Time	Opponent	Site	Result	Attendance
August 30	7:00 pm	Southern Virginia*	Jayne Stadium; Morehead, KY	W 55–0	6,579
September 8	6:00 pm	at No. 21 Eastern Kentucky*	Roy Kidd Stadium; Richmond, KY (Old Hawg Rifle)	L 17–24	11,600
September 15	1:00 pm	Saint Francis (PA)*	Jayne Stadium; Morehead, KY	L 23–57	5,856
September 22	2:00 pm	at Drake	Drake Stadium; Des Moines, IA	L 25–28	3,540
October 6	1:00 pm	Jacksonville	Jayne Stadium; Morehead, KY	L 17–38	3,817
October 13	1:00 pm	at Dayton	Welcome Stadium; Dayton, OH	L 27–41	2,706
October 20	6:00 pm	at Butler	Butler Bowl; Indianapolis, IN	L 35–39	4,037
October 27	1:00 pm	Campbell^{†}	Jayne Stadium; Morehead, KY	W 70–28	7,300
November 3	1:00 pm	Davidson	Jayne Stadium; Morehead, KY	W 49–14	1,113
November 10	9:00 pm	at San Diego	Torero Stadium; San Diego, CA	L 28–41	2,735
November 17	1:00 pm	Valparaiso	Jayne Stadium; Morehead, KY	W 76–24	1,607
*Non-conference game; ^{†}Homecoming; Rankings from The Sports Network Poll released prior to the game; All times are in Eastern time
