= 2008 Campbell Fighting Camels football team =

American college football season

2008 Campbell Fighting Camels football
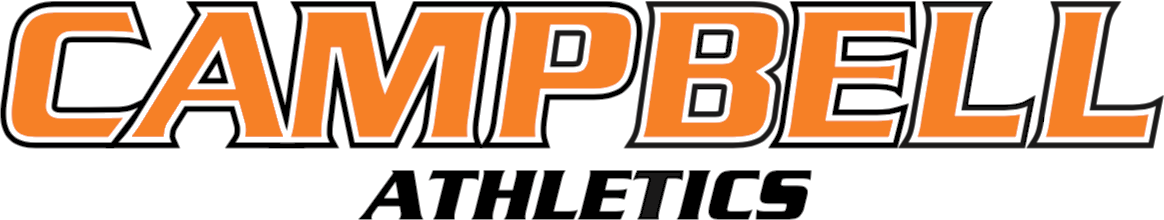
- Conference: Pioneer Football League
- Record: 1–10 (0–8 PFL)
- Head coach: Dale Steele (1st season)
- Offensive coordinator: Oscar Olejniczak (1st season)
- Defensive coordinator: Art Link (1st season)
- Home stadium: Barker–Lane Stadium

2008 Pioneer Football League standings
	Conf.			Overall
Team	W		L	W		L
Jacksonville $	7	–	1	9	–	4
San Diego	6	–	2	9	–	2
Dayton	6	–	2	9	–	3
Butler	4	–	4	6	–	5
Drake	4	–	4	6	–	5
Morehead State	4	–	4	6	–	6
Davidson	3	–	5	4	–	7
Valparaiso	2	–	6	3	–	8
Campbell	0	–	8	1	–	10
$ – Conference champion

The 2008 Campbell Fighting Camels football team represented Campbell University in the 2008 NCAA Division I FCS football season as a member of the Pioneer Football League (PFL). The 2008 season was the first in which Campbell fielded a team. The Fighting Camels were led by head coach Dale Steele and played their home games at Barker–Lane Stadium. Campbell finished the season 1–10 overall and 0–8 in PFL play to place last.

== Schedule ==
Date	Time	Opponent	Site	Result	Attendance
August 30	1:00 p.m.	Birmingham–Southern*	Barker–Lane Stadium; Buies Creek, NC	L 6–12	5,845
September 6	3:00 p.m.	at Methodist*	Monarch Stadium; Fayetteville, NC	L 21–32	2,008
September 13	1:00 p.m.	at Jacksonville	D. B. Milne Field; Jacksonville, FL	L 0–52	2,476
September 20	12:00 p.m.	San Diego	Barker–Lane Stadium; Buies Creek, NC	L 7–43	3,270
September 27	7:00 p.m.	at Carthage*	Art Keller Field; Kenosha, WI	W 36–27	1,175
October 4	1:00 p.m.	at Dayton	Welcome Stadium; Dayton, OH	L 0–42	4,128
October 11	12:00 p.m.	Butler	Barker–Lane Stadium; Buies Creek, NC	L 7–56	3,081
October 18	2:00 p.m.	at Drake	Drake; Des Moines, IA	L 0–45	1,813
November 1	1:00 p.m.	Davidson	Barker–Lane Stadium; Buies Creek, NC	L 0–49	4,054
November 15	12:00 p.m.	Valparaiso	Barker–Lane Stadium; Buies Creek, NC	L 14–47	2,164
November 22	1:00 p.m.	at Morehead State	Jayne Stadium; Morehead, KY	L 7–42	2,978
*Non-conference game; All times are in Eastern time
