= 2012 Dayton Flyers football team =

American college football season

2012 Dayton Flyers football
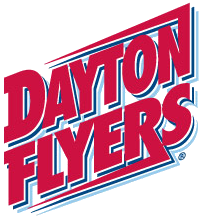
- Conference: Pioneer Football League
- Record: 6–5 (5–3 PFL)
- Head coach: Rick Chamberlin (5th season)
- Offensive coordinator: Chris Ochs (1st season)
- Defensive coordinator: Landon Fox (3rd season)
- Home stadium: Welcome Stadium

2012 Pioneer Football League standings
	Conf.			Overall
Team	W		L	W		L
Butler +	7	–	1	8	–	3
Drake +	7	–	1	8	–	3
San Diego +	7	–	1	8	–	3
Jacksonville	5	–	3	7	–	4
Dayton	5	–	3	6	–	5
Marist	3	–	5	4	–	7
Morehead State	3	–	5	4	–	7
Davidson	2	–	6	2	–	9
Valparaiso	1	–	7	1	–	10
Campbell	0	–	8	1	–	10
+ – Conference co-champions

The 2012 Dayton Flyers football team represented the University of Dayton as a member of the Pioneer Football League (PFL) during the 2012 NCAA Division I FCS football season. Led by fifth-year head coach Rick Chamberlin, the Flyers compiled an overall record of 6–5 with a mark of 5–3 in conference play, tying for fourth place in the PFL. Dayton played home games at Welcome Stadium in Dayton, Ohio.

== Schedule ==
Date	Time	Opponent	Site	Result	Attendance
September 1	1:00 pm	at No. 19 Illinois State*	Hancock Stadium; Normal, IL	L 14–56	4,840
September 8	12:00 pm	at Duquesne*	Arthur J. Rooney Athletic Field; Pittsburgh, PA	L 7–17	1,902
September 15	1:00 pm	Robert Morris*	Welcome Stadium; Dayton, OH	W 20–14	3,116
September 22	1:00 pm	Jacksonville	Welcome Stadium; Dayton, OH	L 17–21	2,523
September 29	1:00 pm	at Butler	Butler Bowl; Indianapolis, IN	L 11–21	2,450
October 6	1:00 pm	at Davidson	Richardson Stadium; Davidson, NC	W 38–3	2,216
October 13	1:00 pm	Morehead State	Welcome Stadium; Dayton, OH	W 41–27	2,706
October 20	1:00 pm	Valparaiso	Welcome Stadium; Dayton, OH	W 45–0	5,077
October 27	9:00 pm	at San Diego	Torero Stadium; San Diego, CA	L 9–41	2,264
November 3	1:00 pm	Drake	Welcome Stadium; Dayton, OH (rivalry)	W 28–13	2,641
November 10	12:00 pm	at Marist	Tenney Stadium at Leonidoff Field; Poughkeepsie, NY	W 21–17	1,666
*Non-conference game; Rankings from The Sports Network Poll released prior to the game; All times are in Eastern time
