= 2009 Campbell Fighting Camels football team =

American college football season

2009 Campbell Fighting Camels football
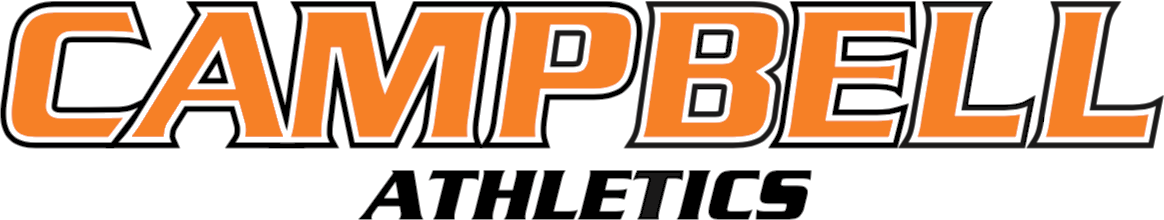
- Conference: Pioneer Football League
- Record: 3–8 (2–6 PFL)
- Head coach: Dale Steele (2nd season)
- Offensive coordinator: Oscar Olejniczak (2nd season)
- Defensive coordinator: Art Link (2nd season)
- Home stadium: Barker–Lane Stadium

2009 Pioneer Football League standings
	Conf.			Overall
Team	W		L	W		L
Butler +	7	–	1	11	–	1
Dayton +	7	–	1	9	–	2
Drake	6	–	2	8	–	3
Jacksonville	6	–	2	7	–	4
Marist	5	–	3	7	–	4
San Diego	3	–	5	4	–	7
Davidson	3	–	5	3	–	7
Campbell	2	–	6	3	–	8
Morehead State	1	–	7	3	–	8
Valparaiso	0	–	8	1	–	10
+ – Conference co-champions

The 2009 Campbell Fighting Camels football team represented Campbell University in the 2009 NCAA Division I FCS football season as a member of the Pioneer Football League (PFL). The Fighting Camels were led by second-year head coach Dale Steele and played their home games at Barker–Lane Stadium. Campbell finished the season 3–8 overall and 2–6 in PFL play to place fifth.

== Schedule ==
Date	Time	Opponent	Site	Result	Attendance
September 5	1:00 p.m.	Methodist*	Barker–Lane Stadium; Buies Creek, NC	W 48–28	3,892
September 12	12:00 p.m.	at Birmingham–Southern*	Panther Stadium; Birmingham, AL	L 28–35 ^{OT}	1,763
September 19	6:00 p.m.	at Davidson	Richardson Stadium; Davidson, NC	L 7–24	4,236
October 3	1:00 p.m.	at Marist	Leonidoff Field; Poughkeepsie, NY	L 13–34	2,922
October 10	1:00 p.m.	Dayton	Barker–Lane Stadium; Buies Creek, NC	L 17–35	2,540
October 17	6:00 p.m.	at Old Dominion*	Foreman Field; Norfolk, VA	L 17–28	19,782
October 24	12:00 p.m.	Butler^{†}	Barker–Lane Stadium; Buies Creek, NC	L 16–23	4,851
October 31	1:00 p.m.	Morehead State	Barker–Lane Stadium; Buies Creek, NC	W 31–22	2,828
November 7	2:00 p.m.	at Drake	Drake Stadium; Des Moines, IA	L 6–49	1,826
November 14	2:00 p.m.	at Valparaiso	Brown Field; Valparaiso, IN	W 17–3	1,217
November 21	1:00 p.m.	Jacksonville	Barker–Lane Stadium; Buies Creek, NC	L 14–34	2,510
*Non-conference game; ^{†}Homecoming; All times are in Eastern time
