= Tripp Merritt =

American football coach (1968–2020)

Biographical details
- Born: March 5, 1968; Albemarle, North Carolina, U.S.
- Died: August 10, 2020 (aged 52); Wilkes-Barre, Pennsylvania, U.S.
- Education: UNC Charlotte

Coaching career (HC unless noted)
- 1991–1992: Western Carolina (GA)
- 1993–1999: Davidson (DC)
- 2000–2002: Saint Mary's (AHC)
- 2003–2004: Bucknell (AHC/DC)
- 2005–2012: Davidson
- 2013: Lenoir–Rhyne (WR)
- 2014: Christ's Church Academy (FL)
- 2015: Susquehanna (S)
- 2017–2018: Wilkes (DC/S)

Head coaching record
- Overall: 31–51 (college)

Guy William "Tripp" Merritt III (March 5, 1968 – August 10, 2020) was an American football coach. He served as the head football coach at Davidson College from 2005 to 2012, compiling a record of 31–51. Merritt died on August 10, 2020, at Wilkes-Barre General Hospital, in Wilkes-Barre, Pennsylvania.

== Head coaching record ==
=== College ===
| Year | Team | Overall | Conference | Standing | Bowl/playoffs |
|---|---|---|---|---|---|
Davidson Wildcats (Pioneer Football League) (2005–2012)
| 2005 | Davidson | 4–6 | 1–2 | 3rd (South) | |
| 2006 | Davidson | 6–4 | 5–2 | 3rd | |
| 2007 | Davidson | 6–4 | 4–3 | 4th | |
| 2008 | Davidson | 4–7 | 3–5 | 7th | |
| 2009 | Davidson | 3–7 | 3–5 | T–6th | |
| 2010 | Davidson | 3–8 | 3–5 | 6th | |
| 2011 | Davidson | 4–7 | 2–6 | T–8th | |
| 2012 | Davidson | 1–8 (Note: Merritt was fired on November 5, 2012. Brett Hayford was named interim head coach and led Davidson for the final two games of the season. The Wildcats finished 2–9 overall and 2–6 in Pioneer Football League play, placing eighth.) | 1–5 | | |
| Davidson: | | 31–51 | 22–33 | | |
| Total: | | 31–51 | | | |
