= 2012 Campbell Fighting Camels football team =

American college football season

2012 Campbell Fighting Camels football
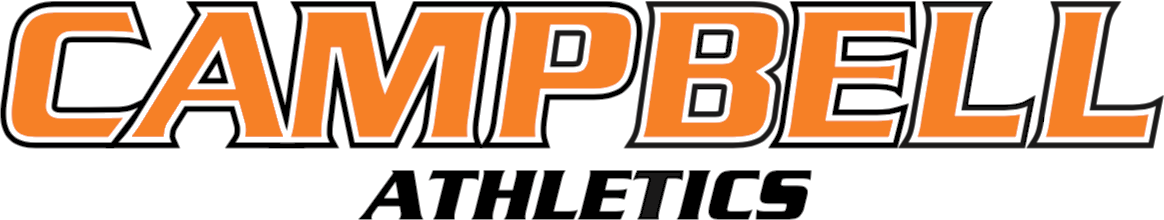
- Conference: Pioneer Football League
- Record: 1–10 (0–8 PFL)
- Head coach: Dale Steele (5th season)
- Home stadium: Barker–Lane Stadium

2012 Pioneer Football League standings
	Conf.			Overall
Team	W		L	W		L
Butler +	7	–	1	8	–	3
Drake +	7	–	1	8	–	3
San Diego +	7	–	1	8	–	3
Jacksonville	5	–	3	7	–	4
Dayton	5	–	3	6	–	5
Marist	3	–	5	4	–	7
Morehead State	3	–	5	4	–	7
Davidson	2	–	6	2	–	9
Valparaiso	1	–	7	1	–	10
Campbell	0	–	8	1	–	10
+ – Conference co-champions

The 2012 Campbell Fighting Camels football team represented Campbell University in the 2012 NCAA Division I FCS football season. They were led by fifth-year head coach Dale Steele and played their home games at Barker–Lane Stadium. They are a member of the Pioneer Football League. On November 5, Campbell announced that Steele had been fired. He remained as the team's head coach for their final two games. They finished the season 1–10, 0–8 in PFL play, to finish in last place.

== Schedule ==
Date	Time	Opponent	Site	Result	Attendance
August 30	7:00 pm	Shorter*	Barker–Lane Stadium; Buies Creek, NC	L 20–31	5,130
September 8	6:00 pm	Virginia–Wise*	Barker–Lane Stadium; Buies Creek, NC	W 10–0	3,628
September 15	6:00 pm	at No. 6 Old Dominion*	Foreman Field; Norfolk, VA	L 14–70	20,068
September 22	1:00 pm	at Butler	Butler Bowl; Indianapolis, IN	L 14–35	1,600
September 29	6:00 pm	Drake	Barker–Lane Stadium; Buies Creek, NC	L 7–35	3,370
October 13	5:00 pm	at San Diego	Torero Stadium; San Diego, CA	L 0–44	3,417
October 20	6:00 pm	Davidson^{†}	Barker–Lane Stadium; Buies Creek, NC	L 21–28	4,640
October 27	2:00 pm	at Morehead State	Jayne Stadium; Morehead, KY	L 28–70	7,300
November 3	1:00 pm	Valparaiso	Barker–Lane Stadium; Buies Creek, NC	L 21–41	2,640
November 10	1:00 pm	at Jacksonville	D. B. Milne Field; Jacksonville, FL	L 14–40	3,012
November 17	1:00 pm	Marist	Barker–Lane Stadium; Buies Creek, NC	L 7–28	2,310
*Non-conference game; ^{†}Homecoming; Rankings from The Sports Network Poll released prior to the game; All times are in Eastern time
