= 2009 Davidson Wildcats football team =

American college football season

2009 Davidson Wildcats football
- Conference: Pioneer Football League
- Record: 3–7 (3–5 PFL)
- Head coach: Tripp Merritt (5th season)
- Home stadium: Richardson Stadium

2009 Pioneer Football League standings
	Conf.			Overall
Team	W		L	W		L
Butler +	7	–	1	11	–	1
Dayton +	7	–	1	9	–	2
Drake	6	–	2	8	–	3
Jacksonville	6	–	2	7	–	4
Marist	5	–	3	7	–	4
San Diego	3	–	5	4	–	7
Davidson	3	–	5	3	–	7
Campbell	2	–	6	3	–	8
Morehead State	1	–	7	3	–	8
Valparaiso	0	–	8	1	–	10
+ – Conference co-champions

The 2009 Davidson Wildcats football team represented Davidson College as a member of the Pioneer Football League (PFL) during the 2009 NCAA Division I FCS football season. The Wildcats were led by fifth-year head coach Tripp Merritt and played their home games at Richardson Stadium. They compiled an overall record of 3–7 with a mark of 3–5 in conference play, tying for sixth in the PFL.

== Schedule ==
Date	Time	Opponent	Site	Result	Attendance	Source
September 5	7:00 p.m.	at Elon*	Rhodes Stadium; Elon, NC	L 0–56	8,258	
September 12	1:00 p.m.	Lenoir–Rhyne*	Richardson Stadium; Davidson, NC	L 0–42	4,177	
September 19	6:00 p.m.	Campbell	Richardson Stadium; Davidson, NC	W 24–7	4,236	
October 3	1:00 p.m.	at Jacksonville	D. B. Milne Field; Jacksonville, FL	L 21–27	3,589	
October 10	1:00 p.m.	Morehead State	Richardson Stadium; Davidson, NC	W 16–10	2,412	
October 17	1:00 p.m.	at Dayton	Welcome Stadium; Dayton, OH	L 0–17	5,069	
October 24	1:00 p.m.	Drake	Richardson Stadium; Davidson, NC	L 16–21	4,174	
October 31	12:00 p.m.	at Butler	Bud and Jackie Sellick Bowl; Indianapolis, IN	L 7–14	2,568	
November 7	4:00 p.m.	at San Diego	Torero Stadium; San Diego, CA	W 34–27	1,843	
November 14	1:00 p.m.	Marist	Richardson Stadium; Davidson, NC	L 6–14	4,011	
*Non-conference game; All times are in Eastern time
