= Tommy Laurendine =

American football player and coach

Current position
- Title: Running backs coach
- Team: Navy
- Conference: AAC

Biographical details
- Born: c. 1968 (age 57–58); Oak Ridge, Tennessee, U.S.

Playing career
- 1988–1989: Lenoir–Rhyne
- Position: Quarterback

Coaching career (HC unless noted)
- 1990–1991: Lenoir–Rhyne (assistant)
- 1991–1994: West Georgia (GA)
- 1994–1995: Northwest Whitfield HS (GA) (OC)
- 1995–1997: Washington and Lee (OC)
- 1997–2000: West Alabama (OC)
- 2001–2006: Southern Arkansas (OC)
- 2007: Washington and Lee (OC)
- 2008–2009: Lenoir–Rhyne (OC)
- 2010: The Citadel (OC)
- 2011–2016: Sewanee
- 2018–2022: Mississippi College (OC)
- 2023: Navy (FB)
- 2024–2025: Navy (OL)
- 2026: Navy (RB)

Head coaching record
- Overall: 15–45

Thomas Laurendine (born c. 1968) is an American football coach. He is the running backs coach at the United States Naval Academy, a position he has held since 2026. Laurendine served as the head football coach at Sewanee: The University of the South from 2011 to 2016. He previously served as an offensive coordinator at Washington and Lee University, the University of West Alabama, Southern Arkansas University, Lenoir–Rhyne University and The Citadel, The Military College of South Carolina. Laurendine was hired as Sewanee's 30th head coach on April 7, 2011. He resigned from his position at Sewanee in February 2017. On January 12, 2018, Laurendine was named offensive coordinator for the Mississippi College Choctaws.

== Head coaching record ==
Year	Team	Overall	Conference	Standing	Bowl/playoffs
Sewanee Tigers (Southern Collegiate Athletic Conference) (2011)
2011	Sewanee	5–5	2–4	5th	
Sewanee:		5–5	2–4		
Sewanee Tigers (Southern Athletic Association) (2012–present)
2012	Sewanee	3–7	1–3	T–4th	
2013	Sewanee	4–6	3–3	T–4th	
2014	Sewanee	2–8	1–5	T–6th	
2015	Sewanee	1–9	0–8	9th	
2016	Sewanee	0–10	0–8	9th	
Sewanee:		15–45	5–27		
Total:		15–45			
