= Gridiron Classic (2006–2009) =

Annual post-season college football game

Gridiron Classic (defunct)
- Stadium: Campus sites
- Operated: 2006–2009
- Conference tie-ins: Northeast Conference; Pioneer Football League

The Gridiron Classic was an annual post-season college football game played from 2006 through 2009. It featured the conference champions from the Pioneer Football League (PFL) and Northeast Conference (NEC), conferences within NCAA Division I Football Championship Subdivision (FCS), formerly known as Division I-AA. The game did not have a set location; it was hosted at the home stadium of one of the participants, alternating between NEC and PFL each playing.

== History ==
The Gridiron Classic was announced in May 2006, initially with a two-year agreement between conferences. The initial playing was set for November 18, 2006, then later rescheduled to December 2, 2006, so teams invited to the Division I FCS playoffs would be known. Structurally, the Gridiron Classic was a bowl game, even through it did not use the word "Bowl" in its name. At the time, it was the only bowl game at the FCS level.

The Gridiron Classic matched up the PFL and NEC champions, unless one of the teams received an at-large bid to the playoffs, which did not happen during the seasons that the game was contested. Prior to 2010, the champions of the PFL and NEC did not receive automatic bids to the FCS playoffs. The NEC champion began receiving an automatic bid in 2010, and the PFL champion began receiving an automatic bid in 2013. Prior to the Gridiron Classic, the NEC had been tied to the ECAC Bowl, which ended in 2003.

In 2010, with the NEC champion receiving an automatic playoff bid, initial plans were to continue the Gridiron Classic with the second-place team from the NEC. However, the game was cancelled by August.

== Game results ==
Date	NEC team		PFL team		Venue	Attend.	Ref.
December 2, 2006	Monmouth†	7	San Diego	27	Kessler Stadium (West Long Branch, NJ)	4,032	
December 1, 2007	Albany	21	Dayton†	42	Welcome Stadium (Dayton, OH)	2,703	
December 6, 2008	Albany†	28	Jacksonville	0	University Field (Albany, NY)	2,264	
December 5, 2009	Central Connecticut State	23	Butler†	28	Butler Bowl (Indianapolis, IN)	1,577	

† host team

== Most appearances ==
Teams with multiple appearances

Team	Appearances	Record
Albany	2	1–1

Teams with a single appearance

Won: Butler, Dayton, San Diego
Lost: Central Connecticut, Jacksonville, Monmouth

== Appearances by conference ==
Conference	Appearances	Wins	Losses	Win pct.
PFL	4	3	1	.750
NEC	4	1	3	.250

== Media coverage ==
Date	TV network	Announcers	Ref.
December 2, 2006	CSTV		
December 1, 2007	—		
December 6, 2008	YES Network	Bob Lorenz, Ross Tucker	
December 5, 2009	—		
