= Pine Lake Preparatory =

American public charter school in North Carolina

Location
- 104 Yellow Wood Circle; Mooresville, North Carolina 28115; United States; 35°32′08″N 80°50′46″W

Information
- Type: Public charter school
- Established: 2006 (20 years ago)
- CEEB code: 342698
- Principal: Timothy Hoffman
- Staff: 110.98 (FTE)
- Grades: K–12
- Enrollment: 1,871 (2018–19)
- Student to teacher ratio: 16.86
- Colors: Navy, white, and gray
- Athletics: NCHSAA 3A
- Athletics conference: Catawba Shores 2A/3A/4A
- Sports: Football, Volleyball, Cross Country, Sailing, Swimming, Basketball, Soccer, Baseball, Tennis, Golf, and Softball
- Team name: Pride
- Website: www.pinelakeprep.org

Pine Lake Preparatory (PLP) is a public charter school located in Mooresville, North Carolina, educating students in grades K–12. PLP was founded in 2006 and started with kindergarten, first, and second grades, with an initial enrollment of 1,300 students. PLP's Upper School students (grades 9–12) choose a fine arts discipline (orchestra, band, visual art, theatre, or chorus) to study for their four years. In addition to the three schools, the campus includes a Fine Arts Building, Athletic and Community Center, and Science, Engineering, Technology and Math building, The school completed construction of a gray and navy blue turf football field in 2015. Students also must study Spanish every year, and the school offered an optional Spanish immersion program in Fall 2015.

== Enrollment ==
Pine Lake Preparatory's students come from all over the Lake Norman area and beyond, although most families live in Iredell or Mecklenburg county. Like other area charter schools, PLP holds a public lottery each year for available spots.

== Education ==
The college preparatory curriculum is rigorous. Students write a research paper in their junior year focused on a career interest, and follow up with a comprehensive project in their senior year. Because of the school's smaller size, students may participate in numerous athletic, civic, and other clubs and teams. Pine Lake has a graduation rate of +95%, with students being admitted to universities including North Carolina State University, IE Law School of Madrid, UNC Chapel Hill, Colorado School of Mines, Duke, Clemson, MIT, and Vanderbilt.
