= Dale Steele =

American football player and coach (1955–2026)

Biographical details
- Born: August 17, 1955; York, Alabama, U.S.
- Died: July 19, 2026 (aged 70)

Playing career
- 1973–1974: South Carolina
- Position: Lineman

Coaching career (HC unless noted)
- 1976: A.C. Flora HS (SC) (assistant)
- 1977: Ball State (GA/OL)
- 1978: Wisconsin (assistant OL)
- 1979: Wisconsin (OE)
- 1980: Tulane (assistant OL)
- 1981: Tulane (TE/K)
- 1982: Tulane (TE/RC)
- 1983: St. Charles HS (LA) (assistant)
- 1984: Wichita State (OLB)
- 1985–1986: Wichita State (TE)
- 1987: Kansas State (TE/ST)
- 1988: Kansas State (WR)
- 1989–1990: East Carolina (WR)
- 1991–1993: East Carolina (WR/RC)
- 1994: East Carolina (AHC)
- 1995–1998: Northern Nash HS (NC)
- 1999–2002: Baylor (WR/RC)
- 2003: East Tennessee State (AHC/WR)
- 2004–2006: Elon (AHC/RB)
- 2008–2012: Campbell

Administrative career (AD unless noted)
- 2013–2015: East Carolina (DFA)
- 2016–2026: East Carolina (DFO/RC)

Head coaching record
- Overall: 14–41

Philip Dale Steele (August 17, 1955 – July 19, 2026) was an American football player and coach. He was formerly the head coach at Campbell University in Buies Creek, North Carolina, a position he had held since restarting school's football program in 2006. Campbell resumed play in the 2008 season. Steele is the brother of Kevin Steele, the current defensive coordinator at University of Alabama and former head football coach at Baylor University.

== Playing career and education ==
The son of a high school coach, Steele participated in football and wrestling at Autauga County High School in Prattville, Alabama, where he lettered three years in both sports. He played as an offensive guard and a defensive tackle for Autauga County High School and then walked on as an offensive lineman for the University of South Carolina.

Steele earned a B.S. degree in physical education from South Carolina in 1976 and an M.A. degree in physical education from Ball State University in 1978.

== Coaching career ==
Steele began his coaching career as an assistant at A.C. Flora High School in Forest Acres, South Carolina. He then moved the college ranks with stops at Ball State University (graduate assistant/offensive line in 1977), the University of Wisconsin–Madison (assistant offensive line in 1978, offensive ends and head junior varsity coach in 1979), Tulane University (offensive line in 1980, tight ends and kickers in 1981, tight ends and recruiting coordinator in 1982), Wichita State University (outside linebackers, 1984–1986), and Kansas State University (tight ends and offensive special teams in 1987, wide receivers in 1988). In 1980, Steele helped Tulane advance to the Hall of Fame Classic, marking his first collegiate postseason appearance as a coach. He also coached at St. Charles High School in LaPlace, Louisiana in 1983.

He served East Carolina University as its recruiting coordinator for three years (1991–1993) and was promoted to assistant head coach for his last season (1994). He worked six seasons at ECU (1989–1994), coaching the wide receivers and helping the Pirates to the 1992 Peach Bowl and the 1994 Liberty Bowl.

After East Carolina, Steele was the head coach and athletic director at Northern Nash High School in Nashville, North Carolina for four years (1995–1998). Then he moved on to Baylor University, where he served as wide receivers coach from 1999–2002 while his brother, Kevin Steele, was the head coach. Steele then served as an assistant head coach for one year at East Tennessee State University (2003), and three seasons at Elon University (2004–2006).

On June 15, 2006, Steele became the head coach at Campbell University, restarting the school's football program after a hiatus dating back to 1950. Upon taking the position at Campbell University, Steele said, "It's a dream come true for my family and me and a tremendous opportunity...As a family, we are so excited that we have been given this opportunity to be a part of a special time in the history of Campbell University with the reinstatement of football after a 56-year absence. We are very thankful to Dr. Wallace, Stan Williamson and the Campbell family for selecting us to come to Buies Creek during such an exciting time in the university's history." Steele was fired as the head coach at Campbell on November 5, 2012.

== Personal life and death ==
Steele and his wife, the former Pam Kilpatrick, had two daughters, Meghan and Kelsey. He died from cancer on July 19, 2026, at the age of 70.

== Head coaching record ==
Year	Team	Overall	Conference	Standing	Bowl/playoffs
Campbell Fighting Camels (Pioneer Football League) (2008–2012)
2008	Campbell	1–10	0–8	9th	
2009	Campbell	3–8	2–6	8th	
2010	Campbell	3–8	2–6	T–7th	
2011	Campbell	6–5	5–3	4th	
2012	Campbell	1–10	0–8	10th	
Campbell:		14–41	9–28		
Total:		14–41			
