= Braxton Harris =

American football coach (born 1984)

Current position
- Title: Head coach
- Team: Campbell
- Conference: CAA Football
- Record: 10–20

Biographical details
- Born: 1983 or 1984 (age 41–42)

Playing career
- 2003–2005: Mary Hardin–Baylor
- Position: Quarterback

Coaching career (HC unless noted)
- 2006: Mary Hardin–Baylor (SA)
- 2007–2009: Mary Hardin–Baylor (WR/RC)
- 2010: Waco HS (TX) (S)
- 2011: Texas Lutheran (DE/RC)
- 2012: Texas Lutheran (LB/RC)
- 2013–2016: Texas Lutheran (AHC/co-DC/ST/LB/RC)
- 2017–2019: Howard Payne
- 2021: Campbell (LB/RC)
- 2022: Campbell (AHC/LB/RC)
- 2023: Houston Christian
- 2024–present: Campbell

Head coaching record
- Overall: 17–47

Braxton Harris (born April 25, 1984) is an American football coach and former player who is currently the head coach for the Campbell Fighting Camels of the Coastal Athletic Association (CAA). He played as a quarterback at Mary Hardin–Baylor and later served as a coach there, at Waco High School, Texas Lutheran, Howard Payne, linebackers coach at Campbell and Houston Christian before receiving the head job at Campbell in 2024.

== Early life and education ==
Born April 25, 1984, Harris attended Mexia High School where he played high school football. He was an all-district quarterback and led his team to the regional semifinals as a junior. At Mexia, he played under his father Craig, who was the head coach. Harris played college football for the Mary Hardin–Baylor Crusaders from 2003 to 2005, being a member of their 2004 national championship finalist team. He graduated from the school in 2008 with a bachelor of science degree in education, later receiving a master's degree in education administration the following year.

== Coaching career ==
After serving 2006 as a student assistant at Mary Hardin–Baylor, Harris became the wide receivers coach and recruiting coordinator for the team in 2007, where he served through 2009. He helped them win the conference championship four times, and reach as far as the NCAA Division III quarterfinals in 2006. He left to become the safeties coach at Waco High School in 2010, serving in that position for only one season.

Harris began coaching at the Division III school Texas Lutheran in 2011, spending his first season as defensive ends coach and recruiting coordinator. The next season, he remained recruiting coordinator but switched to linebackers coach. He began serving as assistant head coach, special teams coordinator, and co-defensive coordinator in 2013, while retaining his roles as recruiting coordinator and linebackers coach. Harris helped them win the conference championship in 2013, while coaching a defense that contributed to Texas Lutheran's placement of sixth nationally in the category of turnover margin.

Harris became head coach of the Howard Payne Yellow Jackets in 2017, and posted a record of 1–9 in his first year, while the team allowed an average of 56 points per game. The Yellow Jackets again won only one game in 2018, but the following season Harris led them to a 5–5 mark, the best record the team had posted since 2006. He announced his resignation in December 2020, after three years with the school, prior to their postponed 2020–21 season. Harris compiled an overall record of 7–23 at Howard Payne.

In 2021, Harris began serving as linebackers coach and recruiting coordinator for the Division I FCS Campbell Fighting Camels. He added the position of assistant head coach in his second season. After the 2022 season, he was named the head coach of the Houston Christian Huskies.

== Head coaching record ==
Year	Team	Overall	Conference	Standing	Bowl/playoffs
Howard Payne Yellow Jackets (American Southwest Conference) (2017–2019)
2017	Howard Payne	1–9	1–8	T–9th	
2018	Howard Payne	1–9	1–8	T–9th	
2019	Howard Payne	5–5	4–5	5th	
Howard Payne:		7–23	6–21		
Houston Christian Huskies (Southland Conference) (2023–present)
2023	Houston Christian	5–5	4–3	4th	
Houston Christian:		5–5	4–3		
Campbell Fighting Camels (Coastal Athletic Association Football Conference) (2024–present)
2024	Campbell	3–9	1–7	14th	
2025	Campbell	2–10	2–6	T–10th	
2026	Campbell	6–1	3–0		
Campbell:		11–20	6–13		
Total:		23–48			
