= Campbell Fighting Camels football =

Intercollegiate American football team for Campbell University

2026 Campbell Fighting Camels football team
- First season: 1925; 101 years ago (Note: The first football team fielded played from 1925 to 1950, then was folded. The program was restarted in 2008; 18 years ago.)
- Athletic director: Hannah Bazemore
- Head coach: Braxton Harris; 2nd season, 5–19 (.208)
- Location: Buies Creek, North Carolina
- Stadium: Barker–Lane Stadium (capacity: 6,200)
- NCAA division: Division I FCS
- Conference: CAA Football
- Colors: Black and orange
- All-time record: 61–126 (.326)
- Consensus All-Americans: Caleb Snead (2018)
- Rivalries: Davidson Wildcats
- Fight song: Campbell University Fight Song
- Mascot: Gaylord the Camel; Gladys the Camel
- Marching band: Sound of the Sandhills
- Website: GoCamels.com

The Campbell Fighting Camels football program represents Campbell University in American football. The team is located in Buies Creek, North Carolina. Campbell competes in the NCAA Division I Football Championship Subdivision (FCS) as a member of the CAA Football, the football league operated by the multi-sports Coastal Athletic Association (CAA). Campbell's first football team was fielded in 2008, and they play home games at the 5,000-seat Barker–Lane Stadium in Buies Creek, North Carolina.

The Fighting Camels transitioned to offering scholarships in football (they already offered them in other sports) and joined the Big South in 2018, where most of the school's other sports teams were already competing. In 2023, the football team transitioned into CAA Football, coinciding with the rest of the athletic program joining the multi-sports CAA.

== History ==
Initial Football Program: 1925–1950

Prior to being renamed after university founder J.A. Campbell in 1926, the Buies Creek Academy added football in 1925. The then newly named Campbell Junior College would win North Carolina Junior College State Championships in 1929 and 1932 along with a shared state title in 1939 with Belmont Abbey College and Brevard College.

Campbell would see football halted due to World War II, but would go on to win three straight North Carolina Junior College State titles in 1946, 1947, and 1948. The Korean War brought further strain on the athletics department as well as the increasing number of Campbell's opponents making the transition to 4-year colleges and universities, causing Campbell to drop football as a varsity sport indefinitely.

Non-Football Period: 1951–2007

In the period between football programs, Campbell became a 4-year school in 1961 and began competing in the National Association of Intercollegiate Athletics. In 1977, Campbell moved to the National Collegiate Athletic Association and became a founding member of the Big South Conference in 1983.

Football Revival: 2008–Present

In 2006, Campbell University announced that they would be restarting their football program and play Division 1 FCS football in 2008. The Camels would play at the newly built Barker-Lane Stadium, which has hosted Campbell since the revival of Camel Football.

The Camels would begin play in the non-scholarship Pioneer Football League and remain in the conference through 2017. In 2018, Campbell upgraded its program to offer football scholarships and joined the rest of Campbell's athletic programs in the Big South Conference. In 2023, Campbell announced that they would be moving to the Colonial Athletic Association with the Campbell football program joining the Coastal Athletic Association Football Conference.

Dale Steele was hired as the program's first head coach since bringing back football, and coached Campbell football from 2008 until his dismissal in 2012. Steele's record at Campbell was 14–41.

After the 2012 season, Mike Minter was hired as head coach and would coach the Camels until his resignation in 2023. Minter had a record of 49–66 during his time at Campbell.

In 2024, former Campbell assistant coach Braxton Harris was named head coach and led Campbell to a 3–9 record in his first season since coming back from Houston Christian University.

=== Classifications ===
- 2008–present: NCAA Division I–AA/FCS

=== Conference memberships ===
- 1925–1950: Independent
- 1951–2007: No team
- 2008–2017: Pioneer
- 2018–2022: Big South
- 2023–present: CAA Football

== Current coaching staff ==
Name	Title	Position coach
Braxton Harris	Head coach	N/A
Eric Daniels	Defensive Coordinator	Linebackers
Matt Kubik	Offensive coordinator	Quarterbacks
Eric Amoako	Assistant Coach	Cornerbacks
Matt Chiappelli	Assistant Coach/Video Coordinator	Tight Ends
Larry Hart	Assistant Coach	Defensive line
Ross Hornor	Offensive Run Game Coordinator/Recruiting Coordinator	Offensive line
Mike Ridings	Assistant Coach	Safeties
Larry Dace	Assistant Coach	Running Backs
Trey Lowe	Assistant coach	Wide Receivers
Luke Sutton	Assistant Coach	Wide Receivers
David Crane	Director of Football Operations	N/A
Trevor Kana	Director of Sports Performance	N/A
Marcus Olivieri	Director of Equipment Operations	N/A

== Notable former players ==
Notable alumni include:

- Brian Hudson
- Julian Hill, Miami Dolphins player and the first Camel to make an NFL final roster.
- Brevin Allen, Los Angeles Chargers player and the first Camel to play in an NFL game.

== Year-by-year results ==
Statistics correct as of the end of the 2025–26 college football season

NCAA Division I champions	NCAA Division I FCS champions	Conference champions	Division champions	Bowl Eligible	Undefeated Season

Year	NCAA Division	Conference	Overall			Conference				Coach	Final Ranking
Year	NCAA Division	Conference	Win	Loss	Pct.	Win	Loss	Pct.	Standing	Coach	Final Ranking
2008	FCS	Pioneer	1	10	.091	0	8	.000	9th	Dale Steele	–
2009	FCS	Pioneer	3	8	.273	2	6	.250	8th	Dale Steele	–
2010	FCS	Pioneer	3	8	.273	2	6	.250	T–7th	Dale Steele	–
2011	FCS	Pioneer	6	5	.545	5	3	.625	4th	Dale Steele	–
2012	FCS	Pioneer	1	10	.091	0	8	.000	10th	Dale Steele	–
2013	FCS	Pioneer	3	9	.250	1	7	.125	8th	Mike Minter	–
2014	FCS	Pioneer	5	7	.417	4	4	.500	T–4th	Mike Minter	–
2015	FCS	Pioneer	5	6	.455	3	5	.375	7th	Mike Minter	–
2016	FCS	Pioneer	5	5	.500	3	4	.429	6th	Mike Minter	–
2017	FCS	Pioneer	6	5	.545	5	3	.625	T–3rd	Mike Minter	–
2018	FCS	Big South	6	5	.545	1	4	.200	5th	Mike Minter	–
2019	FCS	Big South	6	5	.545	3	3	.500	4th	Mike Minter	–
2020	FCS	FCS Independent	0	4	.000	–	–	–	–	Mike Minter	–
2021	FCS	Big South	3	8	.375	2	5	.286	8th	Mike Minter	–
2022	FCS	Big South	5	6	.455	2	3	.400	3rd	Mike Minter	–
2023	FCS	CAA	5	6	.455	4	4	.500	9th	Mike Minter	–
2024	FCS	CAA	3	9	.250	1	7	.125	14th	Braxton Harris	–
2025	FCS	CAA	2	10	.167	2	6	.250	T–10th	Braxton Harris	–
Totals			61	126	.326	41	82	.333			

== Future non-conference opponents ==
Announced schedules as of September 16, 2026.

2026	2027	2028	2029
at East Tennessee State	Norfolk State	at Duke	at Norfolk State
Western Carolina	at Wake Forest	at Furman	at NC State
at Florida	East Tennessee State		
at NC Central	at Western Carolina		
