= Barker–Lane Stadium =

Multi-purpose stadium in Buies Creek, North Carolina

Coordinates: 35.4046°N 78.7427°W

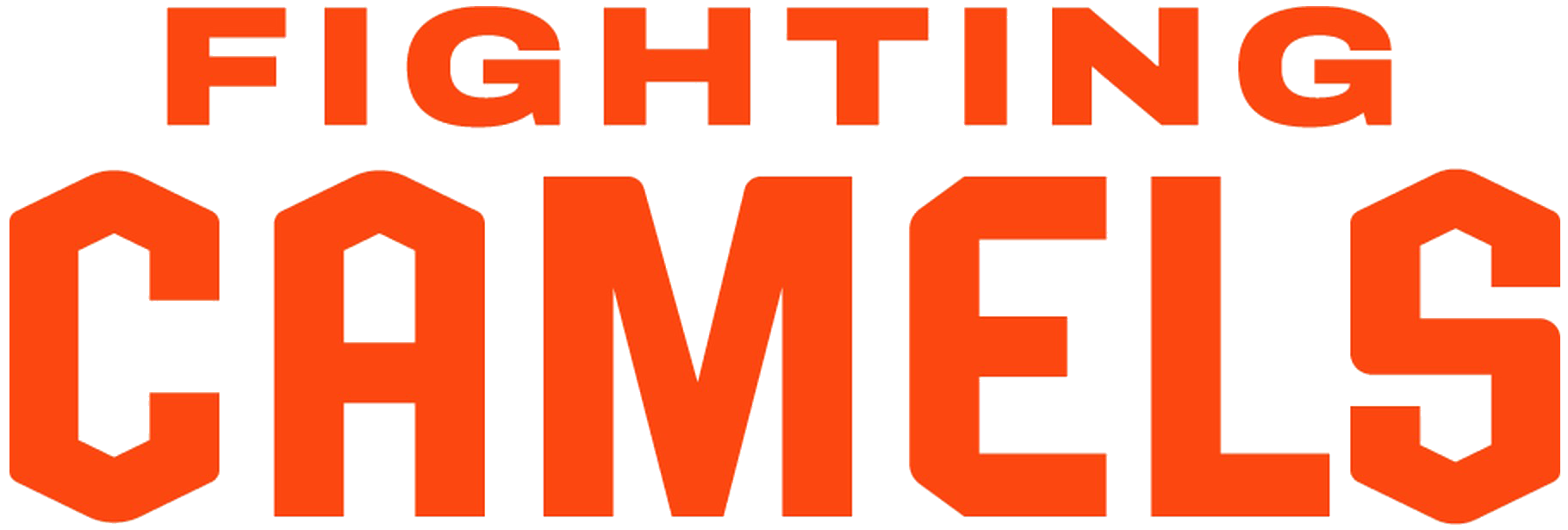
- Interactive map of Barker–Lane Stadium
- Full name: Barker-Lane Stadium and Ed Gore Field
- Address: Buies Creek, NC; United States
- Location: 558 Wade Stewart Road; Buies Creek, NC 27506
- Owner: Campbell University
- Operator: Campbell University Athletics
- Capacity: 5,500 (2013–present)
- Type: Stadium
- Surface: FieldTurf
- Current use: Football; Lacrosse

Construction
- Groundbreaking: March 15, 2007
- Opened: August 30, 2008; 18 years ago
- Cost: $10 million
- Architects: McMillan Smith & Partners (now McMillan, Pazdan & Smith)
- General contractor: T. A. Loving

Tenants
- Campbell Fighting Camels (NCAA) teams: football; women's lacrosse

Website
- gocamels.com/Barker-LaneStadium

Barker–Lane Stadium is a stadium in Buies Creek, North Carolina. The venue is located on the campus of Campbell University and hosts the school's football and women's lacrosse programs. The stadium was scheduled to be completed in stages with the first stage to include the field, the field house, the main entrance, the bowl, seating for 5,000 spectators and necessary road realignment. Barker–Lane received a major expansion in 2013 with the construction of the West stand that increased capacity to 5,500.

The newly constructed West stand includes seating for 3,000, with 867 chair back seats plus additional bleacher back seats, an 80-foot (24 m) tall press box, new restrooms, and new concession facilities. In 2016, a state-of-the-art HD Daktronics video board was added to the north endzone. In 2018, new field turf was installed with a completely revamped midfield logo just in time for the 2018 Campbell Fighting Camels season kickoff. The first scoring play in Barker–Lane Stadium was a field goal kicked by Adam Willets. Barker–Lane Stadium is considered by many to have one of the best gameday atmospheres in all of Division I FCS football. In their six home games last fall, the Fighting Camels averaged a sellout crowd with 5,523 fans per game. By drawing 101 percent over its capacity of 5,500, Barker–Lane Stadium ranked in the Top 10 in all Division I football—both the FCS and FBS—in attendance over capacity.

== Football attendance records ==
Rank	Attendance	Date	Game Result
1	6,783	October 19, 2019	Campbell 31, Hampton 16
2	6,712	October 27, 2018	Campbell 7, Gardner–Webb 35
3	6,610	September 24, 2016	Campbell 33, Butler 27^{OT}
4	6,601	October 28, 2017	Campbell 48, Jacksonville 54^{3OT}
5	6,580	October 24, 2015	Campbell 27, Morehead State 31
6	6,472	August 28, 2014	Campbell 9, Charlotte 33
7	6,387	September 30, 2017	Campbell 38, Morehead State 0
8	6,370	September 27, 2014	Campbell 34, Valparaiso 24
9	6,352	September 29, 2018	Campbell 30, North Alabama 7
10	6,345	October 18, 2014	Campbell 28, Davidson 27
11	6,047	September 7, 2019	Campbell 38, Shaw 14
12	6,044	September 14, 2013	Campbell 10, Charleston Southern 30
13	5,860	September 17, 2016	Campbell 14, Presbyterian 31
14	5,853	September 9, 2017	Campbell 10, Georgetown 16
15	5,845	August 30, 2008	Campbell 6, Birmingham–Southern 12
16	5,673	October 5, 2019	Campbell 28, Presbyterian 14
17	5,624	August 30, 2018	Campbell 49, Chowan 26
18	5,582	September 12, 2015	Campbell 35, Chowan 3
19	5,538	September 7, 2013	Campbell 56, Virginia–Wise 21
20	5,465	October 6, 2018	Campbell 49, Wagner 3

== See also ==
- List of NCAA Division I FCS football stadiums
