= List of Jacksonville Dolphins football seasons =

This is a list of seasons completed by the Jacksonville Dolphins football team. The Dolphins had last competed in the Pioneer Football League as a member of the NCAA Division I FCS. The program began in 1998 as a Division I-AA Independent, and joined the Pioneer League in 2001 until 2019. On December 3, 2019, the university announced it would discontinue its football program, effective immediately.

== Seasons ==
Legend

†National Champions
^{†} Conference champions
^{‡} Division champions
^Bowl game berth/Playoff Result

List of Jacksonville Dolphins football seasons
Season	Team	Head coach	Conference	Division	Regular season results					Postseason results	Final ranking	
Season	Team	Head coach	Conference	Division	Overall		Conference			Bowl game/Playoff result	TSN/STATS Poll	Coaches' Poll
Season	Team	Head coach	Conference	Division	Win	Loss	Win	Loss	Finish	Bowl game/Playoff result	TSN/STATS Poll	Coaches' Poll
Jacksonville Dolphins
1998	1998	Steve Gilbert	Independent	—	4	5			—	—	—	—
1999	1999	Steve Gilbert	Independent	—	3	6			—	—	—	—
2000	2000	Steve Gilbert	Independent	—	3	8			—	—	—	—
2001	2001^{‡}	Steve Gilbert	Pioneer	South	6	5	3	0	1st^{‡}	—	—	—
2002	2002	Steve Gilbert	Pioneer	South	3	7	0	3	4th	—	—	—
2003	2003	Steve Gilbert	Pioneer	South	5	6	1	2	T–2nd	—	—	—
2004	2004^{‡}	Steve Gilbert	Pioneer	South	3	7	2	1	T–1st^{‡}	—	—	—
2005	2005	Steve Gilbert	Pioneer	South	4	4	2	1	2nd	—	—	—
2006	2006	Steve Gilbert	Pioneer	—	4	6	4	3	4th	—	—	—
2007	2007	Kerwin Bell	Pioneer	—	3	8	2	5	T–7th	—	—	—
2008	2008^{†}	Kerwin Bell	Pioneer	—	9	4	7	1	1st^{†}	Lost 2008 Gridiron Classic against Albany, 0–28 ^	—	—
2009	2009	Kerwin Bell	Pioneer	—	7	4	6	2	T–3rd	—	—	—
2010	2010^{†}	Kerwin Bell	Pioneer	—	10	1	8	0	T–1st^{†}	—	22	22
2011	2011	Kerwin Bell	Pioneer	—	7	4	6	2	3rd	—	—	—
2012	2012	Kerwin Bell	Pioneer	—	7	4	5	3	T–4th	—	—	—
2013	2013	Kerwin Bell	Pioneer	—	5	6	4	4	6th	—	—	—
2014	2014^{†}	Kerwin Bell	Pioneer	—	9	2	7	1	1st^{†}	—	—	—
2015	2015	Kerwin Bell	Pioneer	—	9	2	6	2	T–3rd	—	—	—
2016	2016	Ian Shields	Pioneer	—	5	5	4	3	5th	—	—	—
2017	2017	Ian Shields	Pioneer	—	7	4	5	3	3rd	—	—	—
2018	2018	Ian Shields	Pioneer	—	2	8	1	7	10th	—	—	—
2019	2019	Ian Shields	Pioneer	—	3	9	1	7	T–9th	—	—	—
Totals					All-time: 118–115 (.506)		Conference: 74–50 (.597)		—	Postseason: 0–1 (.000)	—	—
