= 2002 Jacksonville Dolphins football team =

American college football team

2002 Jacksonville Dolphins football
- Conference: Pioneer Football League
- South Division
- Record: 3–7 (0–3 PFL)
- Head coach: Steve Gilbert (5th season)
- Defensive coordinator: Shap Boyd (3rd season)
- Home stadium: D. B. Milne Field

2002 Pioneer Football League standings
	Conf.			Overall
Team	W		L	W		L
North Division
Dayton xy$	4	–	0	11	–	1
San Diego	3	–	1	5	–	5
Butler	2	–	2	4	–	6
Drake	1	–	3	5	–	6
Valparaiso	0	–	4	1	–	10
South Division
Morehead State xy	3	–	0	9	–	3
Davidson	2	–	1	7	–	3
Austin Peay	1	–	2	7	–	5
Jacksonville	0	–	3	3	–	7
Championship: Dayton 28, Morehead State 0
$ – Conference champion; x – Division champion/co-champions; y – Championship game participant

The 2002 Jacksonville Dolphins football team represented Jacksonville University as a member of the South Division of the Pioneer Football League (PFL) during the 2002 NCAA Division I-AA football season. Led by fifth-year head coach Steve Gilbert, the Dolphins compiled an overall record of 3–7 with a mark of 0–3 conference play, placing last in the PFL's South Division. Jacksonville played home games at D. B. Milne Field in Jacksonville, Florida.

== Schedule ==
Date	Time	Opponent	Site	Result	Attendance	Source
September 7		Lenoir–Rhyne*	D. B. Milne Field; Jacksonville, FL	W 37–27	1,919	
September 14		at Davidson	Richardson Stadium; Davidson, NC	L 10–28	1,848	
September 21		Presbyterian*	D. B. Milne Field; Jacksonville, FL	L 7–14	1,189	
September 28		Austin Peay	D. B. Milne Field; Jacksonville, FL	L 16–20	1,008	
October 5		at San Diego*	Torero Stadium; San Diego, CA	L 20–44	3,597	
October 19		at Morehead State	Jayne Stadium; Morehead, KY	L 14–48	7,833	
October 26	1:30 p.m.	at Charleston Southern*	Buccaneer Field; North Charleston, SC	W 24–21	2,880	
October 31		at FIU*	FIU Stadium; Miami, FL	L 6–39	5,221	
November 9		Edward Waters*	D. B. Milne Field; Jacksonville, FL	W 44–31	2,650	
November 16	1:00 p.m.	Wagner*	D. B. Milne Field; Jacksonville, FL	L 7–42	1,009	
*Non-conference game; All times are in Eastern time
