= 2001 Jacksonville Dolphins football team =

American college football team

2001 Jacksonville Dolphins football

PFL co-champion PFL South Division champion

PFL Championship Game, L 14–46 at Dayton
- Conference: Pioneer Football League
- South Division
- Record: 6–5 (3–0 PFL)
- Head coach: Steve Gilbert (4th season)
- Defensive coordinator: Shap Boyd (2nd season)
- Home stadium: D. B. Milne Field

2001 Pioneer Football League standings
	Conf.			Overall
Team	W		L	W		L
North Division
Dayton xy$	3	–	0	10	–	1
Butler	2	–	2	5	–	5
San Diego	2	–	2	6	–	3
Drake	1	–	3	5	–	5
Valparaiso	1	–	3	3	–	8
South Division
Jacksonville xy	3	–	0	6	–	5
Morehead State	2	–	1	6	–	5
Davidson	1	–	2	5	–	4
Austin Peay	0	–	3	3	–	7
Championship: Dayton 46, Jacksonville 14
$ – Conference champion; x – Division champion/co-champions; y – Championship game participant

The 2001 Jacksonville Dolphins football team represented Jacksonville University as a member of the South Division of the Pioneer Football League (PFL) during the 2001 NCAA Division I-AA football season. Led by fourth-year head coach Steve Gilbert, the Dolphins compiled an overall record of 6–5 with a mark of 3–0 conference play, winning the PFL South Division title. Jacksonville advanced to the PFL Championship Game, where the Dolphins lost to Dayton. Jacksonville played home games at D. B. Milne Field in Jacksonville, Florida.

== Schedule ==
Date	Time	Opponent	Site	Result	Attendance	Source
September 1		at Lenoir–Rhyne*	Moretz Stadium; Hickory, NC	W 20–16	1,492	
September 8		Davidson	D. B. Milne Field; Jacksonville, FL	W 45–3	1,842	
September 15		Morehead State	D. B. Milne Field; Jacksonville, FL	W 39–27	1,043	
September 29		at Austin Peay	Governors Stadium; Clarksville, TN	W 38–7	2,748	
October 6	1:00 p.m.	Charleston Southern*	D. B. Milne Field; Jacksonville, FL	L 7–28	1,440	
October 13	4:00 p.m.	at Florida Atlantic*	Pro Player Stadium; Miami Gardens, FL	L 12–35	10,295	
October 20		Virginia–Wise*	D. B. Milne Field; Jacksonville, FL	W 20–13	2,122	
October 27	12:30 p.m.	at Stony Brook*	University Field; Albany, NY	W 29–20	465	
November 3		Western Maryland*	D. B. Milne Field; Jacksonville, FL	L 21–42	1,391	
November 10		Drake*	D. B. Milne Field; Jacksonville, FL	L 23–31	1,181	
November 17		at Dayton*	Welcome Stadium; Dayton, OH (PFL Championship Game)	L 14–46	3,127	
*Non-conference game; All times are in Eastern time
