= 2005 Jacksonville Dolphins football team =

American college football team

2005 Jacksonville Dolphins football
- Conference: Pioneer Football League
- South Division
- Record: 4–4 (2–1 PFL)
- Head coach: Steve Gilbert (8th season)
- Home stadium: D. B. Milne Field

2005 Pioneer Football League standings
	Conf.			Overall
Team	W		L	W		L
North Division
San Diego xy$	4	–	0	11	–	1
Dayton	3	–	1	9	–	1
Drake	2	–	2	6	–	4
Valparaiso	1	–	3	3	–	8
Butler	0	–	4	0	–	11
South Division
Morehead State xy	3	–	0	8	–	4
Jacksonville	2	–	1	4	–	4
Davidson	1	–	2	4	–	6
Austin Peay	0	–	3	2	–	9
Championship: San Diego 47, Morehead State 40
$ – Conference champion; x – Division champion/co-champions; y – Championship game participant

The 2005 Jacksonville Dolphins football team represented Jacksonville University as a member of the South Division of the Pioneer Football League (PFL) during the 2005 NCAA Division I-AA football season. Led by eighth-year head coach Steve Gilbert, the Dolphins compiled an overall record of 4–4 with a mark of 2–1 conference play, and placed second in the PFL's South Division. Jacksonville played home games at D. B. Milne Field in Jacksonville, Florida.

== Schedule ==
Date	Time	Opponent	Site	Result	Attendance
September 1	8:30 p.m.	at Southeastern Louisiana*	Strawberry Stadium; Hammond, LA	Canceled (Note: The Dolphins first game of the season against Southeastern Louisiana was cancelled due to Hurricane Katrina.)	
September 17	1:30 p.m.	at Charleston Southern*	Buccaneer Field; Charleston, SC	L 10–16	971
September 24		Butler*	D. B. Milne Field; Jacksonville, FL	W 55–24	1,248
October 1		at Dayton*	Welcome Stadium; Dayton, OH	L 17–49	7,257
October 8		Morehead State	D. B. Milne Field; Jacksonville, FL	L 12–31	1,123
October 15	12:30 p.m.	Davidson	D. B. Milne Field; Jacksonville, FL	W 21–13	1,658
October 22		at Austin Peay	Governors Stadium; Clarksville, TN	W 33–26	2,223
October 27		North Greenville*	D. B. Milne Field; Jacksonville, FL	W 52–13	3,328
November 4		at Webber International (FL)*	Warrior Turf Field; Babson Park, FL	L 36–42	2,349
*Non-conference game; All times are in Eastern time
