= 2001 Davidson Wildcats football team =

American college football season

2001 Davidson Wildcats football
- Conference: Pioneer Football League
- South Division
- Record: 5–4 (1–2 PFL)
- Head coach: Mike Toop (1st season)
- Home stadium: Richardson Stadium

2001 Pioneer Football League standings
	Conf.			Overall
Team	W		L	W		L
North Division
Dayton xy$	3	–	0	10	–	1
Butler	2	–	2	5	–	5
San Diego	2	–	2	6	–	3
Drake	1	–	3	5	–	5
Valparaiso	1	–	3	3	–	8
South Division
Jacksonville xy	3	–	0	6	–	5
Morehead State	2	–	1	6	–	5
Davidson	1	–	2	5	–	4
Austin Peay	0	–	3	3	–	7
Championship: Dayton 46, Jacksonville 14
$ – Conference champion; x – Division champion/co-champions; y – Championship game participant

The 2001 Davidson Wildcats football team represented Davidson College as a member of the South Division of the Pioneer Football League (PFL) during the 2001 NCAA Division I-AA football season. Led by first-year head coach Mike Toop, the Wildcats compiled an overall record of 5–4 with a mark of 1–2 in conference play, placing third in the PFL's South Division.

== Schedule ==
Date	Opponent	Site	Result	Attendance	Source
September 1	Valparaiso	Richardson Stadium; Davidson, NC	W 24–7		
September 8	at Jacksonville	D. B. Milne Field; Jacksonville, FL	L 3–45	1,842	
September 15	Drake^{†}	Richardson Stadium; Davidson, NC	Canceled		
September 22	at Emory & Henry*	Fred Selfe Stadium; Emory, VA	W 23–6		
October 6	at Morehead State	Jayne Stadium; Morehead, KY	L 17–28		
October 13	at Georgetown*	Kehoe Field; Washington, DC	L 24–26	1,765	
October 20	at Randolph–Macon*	Day Field; Ashland, VA	W 27–24 ^{OT}		
October 27	Hampden–Sydney*	Richardson Stadium; Davidson, NC	W 37–19		
November 3	at Centre*	Farris Stadium; Danville, KY	L 27–41		
November 10	Austin Peay*	Richardson Stadium; Davidson, NC	W 17–12		
*Non-conference game; ^{†}Homecoming
