= 2002 Davidson Wildcats football team =

American college football season

2002 Davidson Wildcats football
- Conference: Pioneer Football League
- South Division
- Record: 7–3 (2–1 PFL)
- Head coach: Mike Toop (2nd season)
- Home stadium: Richardson Stadium

2002 Pioneer Football League standings
	Conf.			Overall
Team	W		L	W		L
North Division
Dayton xy$	4	–	0	11	–	1
San Diego	3	–	1	5	–	5
Butler	2	–	2	4	–	6
Drake	1	–	3	5	–	6
Valparaiso	0	–	4	1	–	10
South Division
Morehead State xy	3	–	0	9	–	3
Davidson	2	–	1	7	–	3
Austin Peay	1	–	2	7	–	5
Jacksonville	0	–	3	3	–	7
Championship: Dayton 28, Morehead State 0
$ – Conference champion; x – Division champion/co-champions; y – Championship game participant

The 2002 Davidson Wildcats football team represented Davidson College as a member of the South Division of the Pioneer Football League (PFL) during the 2002 NCAA Division I-AA football season. Led by second-year head coach Mike Toop, the Wildcats compiled an overall record of 7–3 with a mark of 2–1 in conference play, and placed second in the PFL's South Division.

== Schedule ==
Date	Opponent	Site	Result	Attendance	Source
September 7	at VMI*	Alumni Memorial Field; Lexington, VA	L 16–41	5,923	
September 14	Jacksonville	Richardson Stadium; Davidson, NC	W 28–10	1,848	
September 21	at Newberry*	Setzler Field; Newberry, SC	W 34–7		
September 28	Emory and Henry*	Richardson Stadium; Davidson, NC	W 44–7		
October 5	Morehead State	Richardson Stadium; Davidson, NC	L 7–39		
October 12	Georgetown*	Richardson Stadium; Davidson, NC	L 21–25	1,760	
October 19	at Valparaiso	Brown Field; Valparaiso, IN	W 49–32	1,001	
October 26	Wesley*	Richardson Stadium; Davidson, NC	W 31–0		
November 2	at Hampden–Sydney*	Lewis C. Everett Stadium; Hampden Sydney, VA	W 41–38		
November 9	at Austin Peay	Governors Stadium; Clarksville, TN	W 49–28	4,577	
*Non-conference game
