= 2019 Morehead State Eagles football team =

American college football season

2019 Morehead State Eagles football
- Conference: Pioneer Football League
- Record: 5–7 (3–5 PFL)
- Head coach: Rob Tenyer (7th season)
- Defensive coordinator: Tony Brinson (1st season)
- Home stadium: Jayne Stadium

2019 Pioneer Football League standings
	Conf.			Overall
Team	W		L	W		L
San Diego $^	8	–	0	9	–	3
Dayton	6	–	2	8	–	3
Drake	6	–	2	6	–	5
Davidson	5	–	3	8	–	4
Stetson	4	–	4	7	–	4
Marist	4	–	4	4	–	7
Morehead State	3	–	5	5	–	7
Butler	2	–	6	3	–	9
Jacksonville	1	–	7	3	–	9
Valparaiso	1	–	7	1	–	11
$ – Conference champion; ^ – FCS playoff participant

The 2019 Morehead State Eagles football team represented Morehead State University in the 2019 NCAA Division I FCS football season. They were led by seventh-year head coach Rob Tenyer and played their home games at Jayne Stadium. They were members of the Pioneer Football League.

== Preseason ==
=== Preseason coaches' poll ===
The Pioneer League released their preseason coaches' poll on July 30, 2019. The Eagles were picked to finish tied for ninth place.

=== Preseason All-PFL teams ===
The Eagles had one player selected to the preseason all–PFL teams.

Offense

Second team

Jarin Higginbotham – WR

== Schedule ==
Date	Time	Opponent	Site	TV	Result	Attendance
August 29	6:00 p.m.	Union (TN)*	Jayne Stadium; Morehead, KY	ESPN+	W 44–7	6,156
September 7	7:30 p.m.	at No. 16 Illinois State*	Hancock Stadium; Normal, IL	ESPN+	L 14–42	11,256
September 14	4:00 p.m.	Kentucky Christian*	Jayne Stadium; Morehead, KY	ESPN+	W 73–34	7,133
September 21	7:00 p.m.	at Murray State*	Roy Stewart Stadium; Murray, KY	ESPN+	L 7–59	11,921
October 5	1:00 p.m.	Davidson	Jayne Stadium; Morehead, KY	ESPN+	L 31–42	4,944
October 12	1:00 p.m.	at Jacksonville	D. B. Milne Field; Jacksonville, FL	ESPN+	W 30–22	1,433
October 19	2:00 p.m.	Butler^{†}	Jayne Stadium; Morehead, KY	ESPN+	W 31–20	9,244
October 26	2:00 p.m.	at Drake	Drake Stadium; Des Moines, IA	MC22	L 17–36	2,134
November 2	1:00 p.m.	Dayton	Jayne Stadium; Morehead, KY	ESPN+	L 35–49	4,358
November 9	2:00 p.m.	at Valparaiso	Brown Field; Valparaiso, IN	ESPN+	W 27–21	1,477
November 16	5:00 p.m.	at San Diego	Torero Stadium; San Diego, CA	WCC Network	L 20–52	1,898
November 23	1:00 p.m.	Stetson	Jayne Stadium; Morehead, KY	ESPN+	L 16–31	2,134
*Non-conference game; ^{†}Homecoming; Rankings from STATS Poll released prior to the game; All times are in Eastern time

== Game summaries ==
=== Union (KY) ===
	1	2	3	4	Total
Bulldogs	0	0	0	7	7
Eagles	7	16	14	7	44

=== At Illinois State ===
	1	2	3	4	Total
Eagles	0	0	7	7	14
No. 16 Redbirds	21	14	0	7	42

=== Kentucky Christian ===
	1	2	3	4	Total
Knights	21	7	6	0	34
Eagles	21	10	21	21	73

=== At Murray State ===
	1	2	3	4	Total
Eagles	0	0	7	0	7
Racers	14	17	21	7	59

=== Davidson ===
	1	2	3	4	Total
Wildcats	14	21	7	0	42
Eagles	7	0	3	21	31

=== At Jacksonville ===
	1	2	3	4	Total
Eagles	7	3	6	14	30
Dolphins	7	0	7	8	22

=== Butler ===
	1	2	3	4	Total
Bulldogs	0	7	7	6	20
Eagles	10	14	0	7	31

=== At Drake ===
	1	2	3	4	Total
Eagles	7	3	0	7	17
Bulldogs	3	12	7	14	36

=== Dayton ===
	1	2	3	4	Total
Flyers	28	7	7	7	49
Eagles	7	7	14	7	35

=== At Valparaiso ===
	1	2	3	4	Total
Eagles	14	0	0	13	27
Crusaders	0	0	14	7	21

=== At San Diego ===
	1	2	3	4	Total
Eagles	0	0	6	14	20
Toreros	3	28	14	7	52

=== Stetson ===
	1	2	3	4	Total
Hatters	0	14	7	10	31
Eagles	0	6	7	3	16
