= 2005 Davidson Wildcats football team =

American college football season

2005 Davidson Wildcats football
- Conference: Pioneer Football League
- Record: 4–6 (2–4 PFL)
- Head coach: Tripp Merritt (1st season)
- Home stadium: Richardson Stadium

2005 Pioneer Football League standings
	Conf.			Overall
Team	W		L	W		L
North Division
San Diego xy$	4	–	0	11	–	1
Dayton	3	–	1	9	–	1
Drake	2	–	2	6	–	4
Valparaiso	1	–	3	3	–	8
Butler	0	–	4	0	–	11
South Division
Morehead State xy	3	–	0	8	–	4
Jacksonville	2	–	1	4	–	4
Davidson	1	–	2	4	–	6
Austin Peay	0	–	3	2	–	9
Championship: San Diego 47, Morehead State 40
$ – Conference champion; x – Division champion/co-champions; y – Championship game participant

The 2005 Davidson Wildcats football team represented Davidson College as a member of the Pioneer Football League (PFL) during the 2005 NCAA Division I-AA football season. Led by first-year head coach Tripp Merritt, the Wildcats compiled an overall record of 4–6 with a mark of 2–4 in conference play, and would place third in the PFL South Division. The team played their home games at Richardson Stadium in Davidson, North Carolina.

== Schedule ==
Date	Time	Opponent	Site	Result	Attendance	Source
September 3	1:00 p.m.	at VMI*	Alumni Memorial Stadium; Lexington, VA	L 0–33	5,215	
September 10	7:00 p.m.	Greensboro College*	Richardson Stadium; Davidson, NC	W 32–7	4,712	
September 17	7:00 p.m.	Lenoir–Rhyne*	Richardson Stadium; Davidson, NC	L 9–16	7,106	
September 24	1:00 p.m.	at Valparaiso	Brown Field; Valparaiso, IN	W 48–17	1,302	
October 1	1:00 p.m.	Drake	Richardson Stadium; Davidson, NC	L 17-58	3,742	
October 8	1:00 p.m.	Austin Peay	Richardson Stadium; Davidson, NC	W 44–6	1,876	
October 15	12:30 p.m.	at Jacksonville	D. B. Milne Field; Jacksonville, FL	L 13–21	1,658	
October 22	1:00 p.m.	at Morehead State	Jayne Stadium; Morehead, KY	L 13–31	3,778	
October 29	1:00 p.m.	Dayton	Richardson Stadium; Davidson, NC	L 15–45	3,127	
November 12	12:30 p.m.	at Georgetown*	Cooper Field; Washington, D.C.	W 10–3	1,354	
*Non-conference game; All times are in Eastern time
