= Stephen Gilbert (disambiguation) =

Stephen Gilbert (1910–2007) was a British painter and sculptor.

Steve or Stephen Gilbert may also refer to:

- Stephen Gilbert (novelist) (1912–2010), Northern Irish novelist
- Stephen Gilbert, Baron Gilbert of Panteg (born 1963), Conservative member of the British House of Lords
- Steve Gilbert (born 1976), British politician
- Steve Gilbert (American football), head football coach at Jacksonville University
