= 2019 San Diego Toreros football team =

American college football season

2019 San Diego Toreros football

PFL champion

NCAA Division I First Round, L 3–17 vs. Northern Iowa
- Conference: Pioneer Football League
- Record: 9–3 (8–0 PFL)
- Head coach: Dale Lindsey (7th season)
- Offensive coordinator: Christian Taylor (2nd season)
- Defensive coordinator: Bobby Jay (2nd season)
- Home stadium: Torero Stadium

2019 Pioneer Football League standings
	Conf.			Overall
Team	W		L	W		L
San Diego $^	8	–	0	9	–	3
Dayton	6	–	2	8	–	3
Drake	6	–	2	6	–	5
Davidson	5	–	3	8	–	4
Stetson	4	–	4	7	–	4
Marist	4	–	4	4	–	7
Morehead State	3	–	5	5	–	7
Butler	2	–	6	3	–	9
Jacksonville	1	–	7	3	–	9
Valparaiso	1	–	7	1	–	11
$ – Conference champion; ^ – FCS playoff participant

The 2019 San Diego Toreros football team represented the University of San Diego as a member of the Pioneer Football League (PFL) during the 2019 NCAA Division I FCS football season. Led by seventh-year head coach Dale Lindsey, the Toreros compiled an overall record of 9–3 with a mark of 8–0 in conference play, winning the PFL title. San Diego earned the conference's automatic bid to the NCAA Division I Football Championship playoffs, where the Toreros lost in the first round to Northern Iowa. The team played home games at Torero Stadium in San Diego.

== Preseason ==
=== Preseason coaches' poll ===
The Pioneer League released their preseason coaches' poll on July 30, 2019. The Toreros were picked to finish in first place.

=== Preseason All–PFL teams ===
The Toreros had thirteen players selected to the preseason all–PFL teams.

Offense

First team

Anthony Lawrence – QB

Michael Bandy – WR

Dan Cooney – OL

Jake Michaels – OL

Second team

Emilio Martinez – RB

Aidan Valencia – OL

Defense

First team

Nick Friedel – DL

Second team

Connor Spencer – DL

Kama Kamaka – LB

Kim Mahoney – LB

Arrion Archie – DB

Special teams

First team

Michael Armstead – RS

Second team

Tanner Kuljian – P

== Schedule ==
Date	Time	Opponent	Site	TV	Result	Attendance	Source
August 31	2:05 p.m.	at Cal Poly*	Alex G. Spanos Stadium; San Luis Obispo, CA	Pluto TV	L 34–52	5,779	
September 7	2:00 p.m.	No. 5 UC Davis*	Torero Stadium; San Diego, CA	WCC Network via Stadium	L 35–38	2,427	
September 21	2:00 p.m.	Harvard*	Torero Stadium; San Diego, CA	WCC Network via Stadium	W 31–23	2,607	
October 5	2:00 p.m.	Marist^{†}	Torero Stadium; San Diego, CA	WCC Network via Stadium	W 31–7	2,763	
October 12	10:00 a.m.	at Davidson	Richardson Stadium; Davidson, NC	Davidson All Access	W 37–17	3,827	
October 19	2:00 p.m.	Valparaiso	Torero Stadium; San Diego, CA	WCC Network via Stadium	W 42–17	1,323	
October 26	9:00 a.m.	at Dayton	Welcome Stadium; Dayton, OH	Facebook Live	W 50–38	1,969	
November 2	2:00 p.m.	Drake	Torero Stadium; San Diego, CA	WCC Network via Stadium	W 49–7	1,556	
November 9	10:00 a.m.	Stetson	Spec Martin Stadium; DeLand, FL	ESPN+	W 51–7	2,027	
November 16	2:00 p.m.	Morehead State	Torero Stadium; San Diego, CA	WCC Network via Stadium	W 52–20	1,898	
November 23	9:00 a.m.	at Jacksonville	D. B. Milne Field; Jacksonville, FL	ESPN+	W 47–28	1,203	
November 30	11:00 a.m.	at No. 6 Northern Iowa*	UNI-Dome; Cedar Falls, IA (NCAA Division I First Round)	ESPN3	L 3–17	3,743	
*Non-conference game; ^{†}Homecoming; Rankings from STATS Poll released prior to the game; All times are in Pacific time

== Ranking movements ==
Ranking movements Legend: RV = Received votes
	Week													
Poll	Pre	1	2	3	4	5	6	7	8	9	10	11	12	Final
STATS FCS	RV													
Coaches	RV													

== Game summaries ==
=== At Cal Poly ===
	1	2	3	4	Total
Toreros	14	0	7	13	34
Mustangs	14	24	14	0	52

=== UC Davis ===
	1	2	3	4	Total
No. 5 Aggies	14	7	7	10	38
Toreros	7	7	14	7	35

=== Harvard ===
	1	2	3	4	Total
Crimson	0	0	7	16	23
Toreros	10	14	7	0	31

=== Marist ===
	1	2	3	4	Total
Red Foxes	0	7	0	0	7
Toreros	7	14	0	10	31

=== At Davidson ===
	1	2	3	4	Total
Toreros	3	14	14	6	37
Wildcats	3	14	0	0	17

=== Valparaiso ===
	1	2	3	4	Total
Crusaders	3	0	14	0	17
Toreros	7	21	14	0	42

=== At Dayton ===
	1	2	3	4	Total
Toreros	13	9	14	14	50
Flyers	7	13	0	18	38

=== Drake ===
	1	2	3	4	Total
Bulldogs	0	0	7	0	7
Toreros	7	28	14	0	49

=== At Stetson ===
	1	2	3	4	Total
Toreros	13	3	14	21	51
Hatters	0	0	0	7	7

=== Morehead State ===
	1	2	3	4	Total
Eagles	0	0	6	14	20
Toreros	3	28	14	7	52

=== At Jacksonville ===
	1	2	3	4	Total
Toreros	10	7	13	17	47
Dolphins	0	14	7	7	28

=== At Northern Iowa–NCAA Division I First Round ===
	1	2	3	4	Total
Toreros	0	3	0	0	3
No. 6 Panthers	7	0	0	10	17
