= 2019 Davidson Wildcats football team =

American college football season

2019 Davidson Wildcats football
- Conference: Pioneer Football League
- Record: 8–4 (5–3 PFL)
- Head coach: Scott Abell (2nd season)
- Defensive coordinator: Jon Berlin (2nd season)
- Home stadium: Richardson Stadium

2019 Pioneer Football League standings
	Conf.			Overall
Team	W		L	W		L
San Diego $^	8	–	0	9	–	3
Dayton	6	–	2	8	–	3
Drake	6	–	2	6	–	5
Davidson	5	–	3	8	–	4
Stetson	4	–	4	7	–	4
Marist	4	–	4	4	–	7
Morehead State	3	–	5	5	–	7
Butler	2	–	6	3	–	9
Jacksonville	1	–	7	3	–	9
Valparaiso	1	–	7	1	–	11
$ – Conference champion; ^ – FCS playoff participant

The 2019 Davidson Wildcats football team represented Davidson College in the 2019 NCAA Division I FCS football season. They were led by second-year head coach Scott Abell and played their home games at Richardson Stadium. They were members of the Pioneer Football League.

== Preseason ==
=== Preseason coaches' poll ===
The Pioneer League released their preseason coaches' poll on July 30, 2019. The Wildcats were picked to finish in fifth place.

Predicted finish	Team	Votes (1st place)
1	San Diego	79 (7)
2	Dayton	66 (2)
3	Drake	64
4	Marist	52
5	Davidson	48
6	Stetson	44
7	Butler	37
8	Jacksonville	30
9	Morehead State	15
9	Valparaiso	15

=== Preseason All-PFL teams ===
The Wildcats had five players selected to the preseason all–PFL teams.

Offense

First team

Wesley Dugger – RB

Zion Johnson – OL

Second team

Jorell Story – FB

Ethan Steinbacher – OL

Defense

Second team

Bryce Perry-Martin – DL

== Schedule ==
Date	Time	Opponent	Site	TV	Result	Attendance	Source
August 31	1:00 p.m.	Georgetown*	Richardson Stadium; Davidson, NC	Davidson All Access	W 27–20	5,367	
September 7	6:00 p.m.	Virginia–Lynchburg*	Richardson Stadium; Davidson, NC	Davidson All Access	W 45–7	4,284	
September 14	7:00 p.m.	West Virginia Wesleyan*	Richardson Stadium; Davidson, NC	Davidson All Access	W 41–0	4,311	
September 21	6:00 p.m.	at Campbell*	Barker–Lane Stadium; Buies Creek, NC	ESPN+	L 29–31	5,393	
October 5	1:00 p.m.	at Morehead State	Jayne Stadium; Morehead, KY	ESPN+	W 42–31	4,944	
October 12	1:00 p.m.	San Diego	Richardson Stadium; Davidson, NC	Davidson All Access	L 17–37	3,827	
October 19	1:00 p.m.	at Jacksonville	D. B. Milne Field; Jacksonville, FL	YouTube	W 49–19	2,732	
October 26	1:00 p.m.	Marist	Richardson Stadium; Davidson, NC	Davidson All Access	L 21–27	4,144	
November 2	1:00 p.m.	Valparaiso	Richardson Stadium; Davidson, NC	Davidson All Access	W 27–21	3,849	
November 9	12:00 p.m.	at Butler	Bud and Jackie Sellick Bowl; Indianapolis, IN	YouTube	W 52–10		
November 16	12:00 p.m.	at Stetson	Spec Martin Stadium; DeLand, FL	ESPN+	W 42–14		
November 23	1:00 p.m.	Drake	Richardson Stadium; Davidson, NC	Davidson All Access	L 28–31		
*Non-conference game; All times are in Eastern time

== Game summaries ==
=== Georgetown ===
	1	2	3	4	Total
Hoyas	0	0	20	0	20
Wildcats	7	13	0	7	27

=== Virginia–Lynchburg ===
	1	2	3	4	Total
Dragons	0	0	0	7	7
Wildcats	10	21	7	7	45

=== West Virginia Wesleyan ===
	1	2	3	4	Total
Bobcats	0	0	0	0	0
Wildcats	14	3	7	17	41

=== At Campbell ===
	1	2	3	4	Total
Wildcats	7	0	7	15	29
Fighting Camels	0	21	0	10	31

=== At Morehead State ===
	1	2	3	4	Total
Wildcats	14	21	7	0	42
Eagles	7	0	3	21	31

=== San Diego ===
	1	2	3	4	Total
Toreros	3	14	14	6	37
Wildcats	3	14	0	0	17

=== At Jacksonville ===
	1	2	3	4	Total
Wildcats	7	14	7	21	49
Dolphins	0	3	10	6	19

=== Marist ===
	1	2	3	4	Total
Red Foxes	7	3	14	3	27
Wildcats	0	7	0	14	21

=== Valparaiso ===
	1	2	3	4	Total
Crusaders	0	6	7	8	21
Wildcats	7	7	7	6	27

=== At Butler ===
	1	2	3	4	Total
Wildcats	0	33	6	13	52
Bulldogs	3	0	0	7	10

=== At Stetson ===
	1	2	3	4	Total
Wildcats	7	7	14	14	42
Hatters	7	7	0	0	14

=== At Drake ===
	1	2	3	4	Total
Bulldogs	7	14	3	7	31
Wildcats	7	7	7	7	28
