= 2019 Stetson Hatters football team =

American college football season

2019 Stetson Hatters football
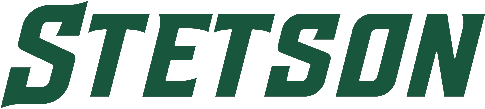
- Conference: Pioneer Football League
- Record: 7–4 (4–4 PFL)
- Head coach: Roger Hughes (7th season)
- Offensive coordinator: Stan Clayton (2nd season)
- Defensive coordinator: Brian Young (7th season)
- Home stadium: Spec Martin Stadium

2019 Pioneer Football League standings
	Conf.			Overall
Team	W		L	W		L
San Diego $^	8	–	0	9	–	3
Dayton	6	–	2	8	–	3
Drake	6	–	2	6	–	5
Davidson	5	–	3	8	–	4
Stetson	4	–	4	7	–	4
Marist	4	–	4	4	–	7
Morehead State	3	–	5	5	–	7
Butler	2	–	6	3	–	9
Jacksonville	1	–	7	3	–	9
Valparaiso	1	–	7	1	–	11
$ – Conference champion; ^ – FCS playoff participant

The 2019 Stetson Hatters football team represented Stetson University as a member of the Pioneer Football League (PFL) during the 2019 NCAA Division I FCS football season. Led by seventh-year head coach Roger Hughes, the Hatters compiled an overall record of 7–4 with a mark of 4–4 in conference play, tying for fifth place in the PFL. Stetson played home games at Spec Martin Stadium on DeLand, Florida.

== Schedule ==
Date	Time	Opponent	Site	TV	Result	Attendance
August 31	7:00 p.m.	Presbyterian*	Spec Martin Stadium; DeLand, FL	ESPN+	Cancelled (Note: The game against Presbyterian was cancelled on Saturday morning over safety concerns due to Hurricane Dorian.)	
September 7	6:00 p.m.	Louisiana College*	Spec Martin Stadium; DeLand, FL	ESPN+	W 58–13	2,173
September 14	12:00 p.m.	at Marist	Tenney Stadium at Leonidoff Field; Poughkeepsie, NY	Red Fox Network	L 23–26	1,456
September 21	6:00 p.m.	Western New England*	Spec Martin Stadium; DeLand, FL	ESPN+	W 59–28	1,330
September 28	1:00 p.m.	North Carolina Wesleyan*	Spec Martin Stadium; DeLand, FL	ESPN+	W 55–21	1,300
October 5	1:00 p.m.	Butler	Spec Martin Stadium; DeLand, FL	ESPN+	W 30–27	1,364
October 19	1:00 p.m.	Dayton	Spec Martin Stadium; DeLand, FL	ESPN+	W 38–21	1,407
October 26	1:00 p.m.	at Valparaiso	Brown Stadium; Valparaiso, IN	ESPN+	L 10–19	878
November 2	1:00 p.m.	at Jacksonville	D. B. Milne Field; Jacksonville, FL	ESPN+	W 27–24	1,754
November 9	1:00 p.m.	San Diego^{†}	Spec Martin Stadium; DeLand, FL	ESPN+	L 7–51	2,027
November 16	1:00 p.m.	Davidson	Spec Martin Stadium; DeLand, FL	ESPN+	L 14–42	1,492
November 23	1:00 p.m.	at Morehead State	Jayne Stadium; Morehead, KY	ESPN+	W 31–16	2,134
*Non-conference game; ^{†}Homecoming; All times are in Eastern time

== Preseason ==
=== Preseason coaches' poll ===
The Pioneer League released their preseason coaches' poll on July 30, 2019. The Hatters were picked to finish in sixth place.

=== Preseason All–PFL teams ===
The Hatters had eight players selected to the preseason all–PFL teams.

Offense

First team

Donald Parham – TE

Andrew Rogalski – OL

Second team

Colin McGovern – QB

Steven Burdette – WR

Jareem Westcott – RB

James McCammon – OL

Defense

First team

Colby Duncan – LB

Second team

JJ Henderson – DB

== Game summaries ==
=== Louisiana College ===
	1	2	3	4	Total
Wildcats	0	7	0	6	13
Hatters	14	17	21	6	58

=== At Marist ===
	1	2	3	4	Total
Hatters	7	3	7	6	23
Red Foxes	12	7	0	7	26

=== Western New England ===
	1	2	3	4	Total
Golden Bears	7	0	7	14	28
Hatters	14	14	24	7	59

=== North Carolina Wesleyan ===
	1	2	3	4	Total
Battling Bishops	14	0	0	7	21
Hatters	7	31	14	3	55

=== Butler ===
	1	2	3	4	Total
Bulldogs	10	7	0	10	27
Hatters	14	0	3	13	30

=== Dayton ===
	1	2	3	4	Total
Flyers	0	7	7	7	21
Hatters	7	14	17	0	38

=== At Valparaiso ===
	1	2	3	4	Total
Hatters	10	0	0	0	10
Crusaders	3	10	6	0	19

=== At Jacksonville ===
	1	2	3	4	Total
Hatters	3	6	8	10	27
Dolphins	0	3	14	7	24

=== San Diego ===
	1	2	3	4	Total
Toreros	13	3	14	21	51
Hatters	0	0	0	7	7

=== Davidson ===
	1	2	3	4	Total
Wildcats	7	7	14	14	42
Hatters	7	7	0	0	14

=== At Morehead State ===
	1	2	3	4	Total
Hatters	0	14	7	10	31
Eagles	0	6	7	3	16
