= Dode Phillips =

American football player and coach (1900–1965)

Biographical details
- Born: January 2, 1900; Bradley, South Carolina, U.S.
- Died: December 29, 1965 (aged 65); Due West, South Carolina, U.S.

Playing career

Football
- 1917–1921: Erskine

Baseball
- 1918–1921: Erskine
- 1923–1924: Anderson Electricians (Carolina League)
- 1925: Greenwood Emeralds (Carolina League)
- 1926: Reading Keystones (International League)
- 1928: Durham Bulls (Piedmont League)
- 1929: Columbia Comers (South Atlantic League); Pittsburgh Pirates affiliate
- Positions: Halfback, Third baseman

Coaching career (HC unless noted)
- 1922–1925: Boys HS (SC)
- 1926–1927: Erskine
- 1928–1936: Moultrie HS (GA)
- 1939–1941: Erskine (assistant)
- 1941 (midseason): Erskine

Administrative career (AD unless noted)
- 1926–1928: Erskine
- 1928–1937: Moultrie HS (GA)
- 1942–1944: Erskine
- 1944–1947: SCHSL (director of physical education)
- 1947–1948: Erskine

Head coaching record
- Overall: 3–14–1

Accomplishments and honors

Awards
- All-Southern (1921); Honorable Mention All-American (1921); Service to Sports Award presented by Atlantic Coast Conference Sportswriters Association (1958); South Carolina Athletic Hall of Fame (1960); NAIA Hall of Fame (1965); Erskine Athletics Hall of Fame (1982)

David Gardiner "Dode" Phillips III (January 2, 1900 – December 29, 1965) was an American football player and coach. He coached high school in Anderson, South Carolina and then his alma mater. He also played several years of minor league baseball before committing to coaching full-time at Moultrie High School in Georgia. Moultrie High won the south Georgia title in 1928. Phillips worked for NBC WFBC as a sports analyst and color commentator in 1937 and 1938 before returning to the sideline as an assistant for Jakie Todd at Erskine. In 1941, Todd was appointed as chief of the state pardon and parole board. Phillips took over and coached Erskine for the final three games of the season.

In 1950, a pool of sportswriters named him the best athlete of the first half of the 20th century in South Carolina. Phillips played for the Erskine Flying Fleet of Erskine College. He was inducted to the school's sports hall of fame. Some writers picked him All-Southern in 1921. Walter Camp included him as an Honorable Mention All-American halfback in 1921. In 1965, just before his death, Phillips was selected to be admitted to the National Association of Intercollegiate Athletics (NAIA) Hall of Fame.

== Head coaching record ==
Year	Team	Overall	Conference	Standing	Bowl/playoffs
Erskine Seceders (Southern Intercollegiate Athletic Association) (1926–1927)
1926	Erskine	1–7	0–4	T–23rd	
1927	Erskine	2–4–1	1–2–1		
Erskine Flying Fleet (Southern Intercollegiate Athletic Association) (1941 (interim))
1941	Erskine	0–3	0–2		
Erskine:		3–14–1	1–8–1		
Total:		3–14–1			
