= Mike Toop =

American football and lacrosse coach

Playing career

Football
- 1973–1976: Merchant Marine
- Position: Linebacker

Coaching career (HC unless noted)

Football
- 1977–1981: Chaminade HS (NY) (assistant)
- 1982: Holy Cross HS (NY) (assistant)
- 1983–1984: Albany (assistant)
- 1985–1986: Union (NY) (assistant)
- 1987–1991: Colgate (assistant)
- 1992–1998: Penn (DC)
- 1999–2000: Connecticut (DC)
- 2001–2004: Davidson
- 2005–2021: Merchant Marine

Lacrosse
- 1985–1987: Union (NY)
- 1988–1991: Colgate

Head coaching record
- Overall: 87–108 (football); 57–28 (lacrosse)
- Bowls: 3–0

Mike Toop is a retired American football and lacrosse coach. He served as the head football coach at the United States Merchant Marine Academy in King's Point, New York, from 2005 until his retirement in 2021, and at Davidson College in Davidson, North Carolina, from 2001 to 2004. He also coached men's lacrosse at Union College in Schenectady, New York, from 1985 to 1987 and Colgate University in Hamilton, New York, from 1988 to 1991.

== Football coaching record ==
Year	Team	Overall	Conference	Standing	Bowl/playoffs
Davidson Wildcats (Pioneer Football League) (2001–2004)
2001	Davidson	5–4	1–2	3rd (south)	
2002	Davidson	7–3	2–1	2nd (south)	
2003	Davidson	3–8	1–2	T–2nd (south)	
2004	Davidson	2–7	1–2	T–3rd (south)	
Davidson:		17–22	5–7		
Merchant Marine Mariners (Liberty League) (2005–2016)
2005	Merchant Marine	3–7	2–5	6th	
2006	Merchant Marine	3–7	1–5	6th	
2007	Merchant Marine	1–9	1–6	T–6th	
2008	Merchant Marine	3–7	2–5	7th	
2009	Merchant Marine	4–6	2–5	T–6th	
2010	Merchant Marine	4–6	3–3	T–3rd	
2011	Merchant Marine	3–7	2–4	T–5th	
2012	Merchant Marine	5–5	3–4	T–4th	
2013	Merchant Marine	4–4	1–4	8th	
2014	Merchant Marine	2–8	0–7	8th	
2015	Merchant Marine	3–6	2–5	T–6th	
2016	Merchant Marine	5–4	4–3	T–3rd	
Merchant Marine Mariners (New England Women's and Men's Athletic Conference) (2017–2021)
2017	Merchant Marine	6–4	4–3	4th	W ECAC Chapman Bowl
2018	Merchant Marine	8–2	5–2	T–2nd	W New England
2019	Merchant Marine	6–3	5–2	T–3rd	
2020–21	Merchant Marine	1–0	0–0	N/A	
2021	Merchant Marine	9–1	5–1	2nd	W New England
Merchant Marine:		70–86	24–35		
Total:		87–108			
