= 2019 Jacksonville Dolphins football team =

American college football season

2019 Jacksonville Dolphins football
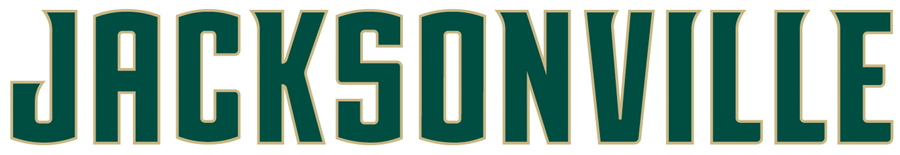
- Conference: Pioneer Football League
- Record: 3–9 (1–7 PFL)
- Head coach: Ian Shields (4th season)
- Offensive coordinator: Trent Steelman (1st season)
- Defensive coordinator: Alan Darlin (3rd season)
- Home stadium: D. B. Milne Field

2019 Pioneer Football League standings
	Conf.			Overall
Team	W		L	W		L
San Diego $^	8	–	0	9	–	3
Dayton	6	–	2	8	–	3
Drake	6	–	2	6	–	5
Davidson	5	–	3	8	–	4
Stetson	4	–	4	7	–	4
Marist	4	–	4	4	–	7
Morehead State	3	–	5	5	–	7
Butler	2	–	6	3	–	9
Jacksonville	1	–	7	3	–	9
Valparaiso	1	–	7	1	–	11
$ – Conference champion; ^ – FCS playoff participant

The 2019 Jacksonville Dolphins football team represented Jacksonville University in the 2019 NCAA Division I FCS football season. They were led by fourth-year head coach Ian Shields and played their home games at D. B. Milne Field. They were members of the Pioneer Football League (PFL). On December 3, 2019, Jacksonville University announced the discontinuation of the football program, making 2019 the final season of Dolphins football.

== Preseason ==
=== Preseason coaches' poll ===
The Pioneer League released their preseason coaches' poll on July 30, 2019. The Dolphins were picked to finish in eighth place.

=== Preseason All–PFL teams ===
The Dolphins had two players selected to the preseason all–PFL teams.

Offense

First team

Garnett Nicolas – FB

Jake Dempsey – OL

== Schedule ==
Date	Time	Opponent	Site	TV	Result	Attendance
August 29	7:00 p.m.	at Richmond*	E. Claiborne Robins Stadium; Richmond, VA	MASN	L 19–38	7,702
September 14	7:00 p.m.	at Presbyterian*	Bailey Memorial Stadium; Clinton, SC	ESPN+	W 30–20	2,208
September 21	1:00 p.m.	Dartmouth*	D. B. Milne Field; Jacksonville, FL	ESPN+	L 6–35	2,077
September 28	1:00 p.m.	Ave Maria*	D. B. Milne Field; Jacksonville, FL	ESPN+	W 42–28	1,643
October 5	1:00 p.m.	at Dayton	Welcome Stadium; Dayton, OH	Facebook Live	L 28–56	2,824
October 12	1:00 p.m.	Morehead State	D. B. Milne Field; Jacksonville, FL	ESPN+	L 22–30	1,433
October 19	1:00 p.m.	Davidson	D. B. Milne Field; Jacksonville, FL	YouTube	L 19–49	2,732
October 26	1:00 p.m.	at Butler	Bud and Jackie Sellick Bowl; Indianapolis, IN	YouTube	L 14–24	3,484
November 2	1:00 p.m.	Stetson	D. B. Milne Field; Jacksonville, FL	ESPN+	L 24–27	1,754
November 9	12:00 p.m.	at Drake	Drake Stadium; Des Moines, IA	Bulldog Vision	L 14–28	1,670
November 16	1:00 p.m.	at Marist	Tenney Stadium at Leonidoff Field; Poughkeepsie, NY	Red Fox Network	W 52–45 ^{2OT}	1,396
November 23	1:00 p.m.	San Diego	D. B. Milne Field; Jacksonville, FL	ESPN+	L 28–47	1,203
*Non-conference game; Rankings from STATS Poll released prior to the game; All times are in Eastern time

== Game summaries ==
=== At Richmond ===
	1	2	3	4	Total
Dolphins	0	6	0	13	19
Spiders	14	17	7	0	38

=== At Presbyterian ===
	1	2	3	4	Total
Dolphins	0	7	3	20	30
Blue Hose	3	10	0	7	20

=== Dartmouth ===
	1	2	3	4	Total
Big Green	14	14	7	0	35
Dolphins	0	0	0	6	6

=== Ave Maria ===
	1	2	3	4	Total
Gyrenes	7	14	0	7	28
Dolphins	17	14	0	11	42

=== At Dayton ===
	1	2	3	4	Total
Dolphins	7	7	7	7	28
Flyers	7	28	7	14	56

=== Morehead State ===
	1	2	3	4	Total
Eagles	7	3	6	14	30
Dolphins	7	0	7	8	22

=== Davidson ===
	1	2	3	4	Total
Wildcats	7	14	7	21	49
Dolphins	0	3	10	6	19

=== At Butler ===
	1	2	3	4	Total
Dolphins	14	0	0	0	14
Bulldogs	6	8	3	7	24

=== Stetson ===
	1	2	3	4	Total
Hatters	3	6	8	10	27
Dolphins	0	3	14	7	24

=== At Drake ===
	1	2	3	4	Total
Dolphins	7	0	0	7	14
Bulldogs	7	7	7	7	28

=== At Marist ===
	1	2	3	4	OT	2OT	Total
Dolphins	14	3	7	14	7	7	52
Red Foxes	7	7	7	17	7	0	45

=== San Diego ===
	1	2	3	4	Total
Toreros	10	7	13	17	47
Dolphins	0	14	7	7	28
