= 2019 Dayton Flyers football team =

American college football season

2019 Dayton Flyers football
- Conference: Pioneer Football League
- Record: 8–3 (6–2 PFL)
- Head coach: Rick Chamberlin (12th season)
- Offensive coordinator: Austin King (3rd season)
- Defensive coordinator: Tee Overman (1st season)
- Home stadium: Welcome Stadium

2019 Pioneer Football League standings
	Conf.			Overall
Team	W		L	W		L
San Diego $^	8	–	0	9	–	3
Dayton	6	–	2	8	–	3
Drake	6	–	2	6	–	5
Davidson	5	–	3	8	–	4
Stetson	4	–	4	7	–	4
Marist	4	–	4	4	–	7
Morehead State	3	–	5	5	–	7
Butler	2	–	6	3	–	9
Jacksonville	1	–	7	3	–	9
Valparaiso	1	–	7	1	–	11
$ – Conference champion; ^ – FCS playoff participant

The 2019 Dayton Flyers football team represented the University of Dayton as a member of the Pioneer Football League (PFL) during the 2019 NCAA Division I FCS football season. Led by 12th-year head coach Rick Chamberlin, the Flyers compiled an overall record of 8–3 with a mark of 6–2 in conference play, tying for second place in the PFL. Dayton played home games at Welcome Stadium in Dayton, Ohio.

== Preseason ==
=== Preseason coaches' poll ===
The Pioneer League released their preseason coaches' poll on July 30, 2019. The Flyers were picked to finish in second place.

=== Preseason All-PFL teams ===
The Flyers had eight players selected to the preseason all–PFL teams.

Offense

First team

Tucker Yinger – RB

Ben Gauthier – OL

Second team

Adam Trautman – TE

Defense

First team

Nick Surges – DL

Andrew Lutgens – LB

David Leisring – DB

Special teams

First team

Sean Smith – P

Matt Tunnacliffe – LS

== Schedule ==
Date	Time	Opponent	Site	TV	Result	Attendance
September 7	1:00 p.m.	at No. 14 Indiana State*	Memorial Stadium; Terre Haute, IN	ESPN+	W 42–35	4,950
September 14	3:00 p.m.	at Robert Morris*	Joe Walton Stadium; Moon Township, PA	NEC Front Row	W 34–31	2,533
September 21	1:00 p.m.	Duquesne*	Welcome Stadium; Dayton, OH	Facebook Live	L 31–35	4,917
October 5	12:00 p.m.	Jacksonville	Welcome Stadium; Dayton, OH	Facebook Live	W 56–28	2,824
October 12	2:00 p.m.	at Valparaiso	Brown Field; Valparaiso, IN	ESPN+	W 41–28	2,388
October 19	1:00 p.m.	at Stetson	Spec Martin Stadium; DeLand, FL	ESPN+	L 21–38	1,407
October 26	12:00 p.m.	San Diego	Welcome Stadium; Dayton, OH	Facebook Live	L 38–50	1,969
November 2	1:00 p.m.	at Morehead State	Jayne Stadium; Morehead, KY	ESPN+	W 49–35	4,358
November 9	1:00 p.m.	Marist	Welcome Stadium; Dayton, OH	Facebook Live	W 59–35	2,001
November 16	2:00 p.m.	at Drake	Drake Stadium; Des Moines, IA (rivalry)	MC22	W 46–29	1,767
November 23	1:00 p.m.	Butler	Welcome Stadium; Dayton, OH	Facebook Live	W 51–38	1,991
*Non-conference game; Rankings from STATS Poll released prior to the game; All times are in Eastern time

== Game summaries ==
=== At Indiana State ===
	1	2	3	4	Total
Flyers	7	14	14	7	42
No. 14 Sycamores	7	7	7	14	35

=== At Robert Morris ===
	1	2	3	4	Total
Flyers	7	13	7	7	34
Colonials	7	10	7	7	31

=== Duquesne ===
	1	2	3	4	Total
Dukes	14	7	7	7	35
Flyers	7	14	7	3	31

=== Jacksonville ===
	1	2	3	4	Total
Dolphins	7	7	7	7	28
Flyers	7	28	7	14	56

=== At Valparaiso ===
	1	2	3	4	Total
Flyers	14	7	13	7	41
Crusaders	7	0	14	7	28

=== At Stetson ===
	1	2	3	4	Total
Flyers	0	7	7	7	21
Hatters	7	14	17	0	38

=== San Diego ===
	1	2	3	4	Total
Toreros	13	9	14	14	50
Flyers	7	13	0	18	38

=== At Morehead State ===
	1	2	3	4	Total
Flyers	28	7	7	7	49
Eagles	7	7	14	7	35

=== Marist ===
	1	2	3	4	Total
Red Foxes	7	7	7	14	35
Flyers	7	21	17	14	59

=== At Drake ===
	1	2	3	4	Total
Flyers	7	18	7	14	46
Bulldogs	14	8	0	7	29

=== Butler ===
	1	2	3	4	Total
Bulldogs	3	14	7	14	38
Flyers	17	21	10	3	51

== Players drafted into the NFL ==
Round	Pick	Player	Position	NFL Club
3	105	Adam Trautman	TE	New Orleans Saints
