= 2005 San Diego Toreros football team =

American college football season

2005 San Diego Toreros football

Consensus mid-major champion PFL champion PFL North Division champion

PFL Championship Game, W 47–40 vs. Morehead State
- Conference: Pioneer Football League
- North Division
- Record: 11–1 (4–0 PFL)
- Head coach: Jim Harbaugh (2nd season)
- Home stadium: Torero Stadium

2005 Pioneer Football League standings
	Conf.			Overall
Team	W		L	W		L
North Division
San Diego xy$	4	–	0	11	–	1
Dayton	3	–	1	9	–	1
Drake	2	–	2	6	–	4
Valparaiso	1	–	3	3	–	8
Butler	0	–	4	0	–	11
South Division
Morehead State xy	3	–	0	8	–	4
Jacksonville	2	–	1	4	–	4
Davidson	1	–	2	4	–	6
Austin Peay	0	–	3	2	–	9
Championship: San Diego 47, Morehead State 40
$ – Conference champion; x – Division champion/co-champions; y – Championship game participant

The 2005 San Diego Toreros football team represented the University of San Diego as a member of the North Division of the Pioneer Football League (PFL) during the 2005 NCAA Division I FCS football season. In their second year under head coach Jim Harbaugh, the Toreros compiled an 11–1 record, outscored their opponents 511 to 205, and won the PFL championship.

== Schedule ==
Date	Opponent	Site	Result	Attendance	Source
September 3	Azusa Pacific*	Torero Stadium; San Diego, CA	W 30–6		
September 10	Southern Oregon*	Torero Stadium; San Diego, CA	W 51–0		
September 17	Yale*	Torero Stadium; San Diego, CA	W 17–14	3,266	
September 24	at Princeton*	Princeton Stadium; Princeton, NJ	L 17–20	6,216	
October 1	at Menlo*	San Jose, CA	W 56–0		
October 8	Butler	Torero Stadium; San Diego, CA	W 49–7	2,645	
October 15	at Dayton	Welcome Stadium; Dayton, OH	W 48–24		
October 22	Drake	Torero Stadium; San Diego, CA	W 31–26		
October 29	at Valparaiso	Brown Field; Valparaiso, IN	W 63–21		
November 5	Chapman*	Torero Stadium; San Diego, CA	W 60–12		
November 12	Marist*	Torero Stadium; San Diego, CA	W 42–35		
November 19	Morehead State*	Torero Stadium; San Diego, CA (PFL Championship Game)	W 47–40	2,883	
*Non-conference game
