= Erskine Flying Fleet football =

College football team for Erskine College

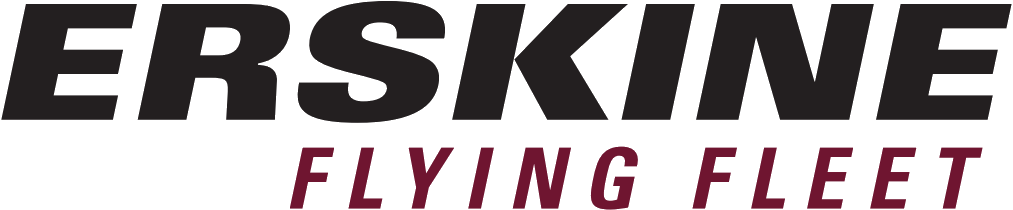
- First season: 1896; 130 years ago (Note: The program was discontinued after their first season, but was reinstated in 1915, then the team was discontinued in 1951 once again. It was relaunched in 2020; 6 years ago.)
- Athletic director: Mark Peeler
- Head coach: Shap Boyd; 5th season, 8–51 (.136)
- Location: Greenwood, South Carolina
- Stadium: J. W. Babb Stadium
- NCAA division: Division II
- Conference: Conference Carolinas (NCAA DII)
- Colors: Garnet and gold
- All-time record: 88–239–11 (.277)
- Website: erskinesports.com/football

The Erskine Flying Fleet football team represents Erskine College in the sport of American football. The Flying Fleet compete in the NCAA Division II as a member of Conference Carolinas. The team is currently led by head coach Shap Boyd, who has held the position since November 15, 2018, making him the first head football coach at Erskine since 1951.

The Erskine College football program was terminated after the 1951 season. The team went on hiatus before announcing the return for the 2020. Due to the global coronavirus pandemic, the fall 2020 season was postponed until spring 2021. The program played its first game in 70 years on February 27, 2021, defeating Barton College, 30–28.

== History ==
Erskine football started in 1896. It was discontinued in 1951. The period from 1917 to 1921 brought most of the program's success, including athlete Dode Phillips. During those seasons they have wins against Wofford, Presbyterian, South Carolina, Clemson, and the Citadel. It was during a game in 1929 that Erskine took on the name "The Flying Fleet". They were given that name by a Greenville reporter who was blown away by their passing performance in the game. They had previously been known as the "Seceders". On October 18, 1948 when they defeated Florida State 14–6. It was only a couple more years until the Flying Fleet ended their football program in 1951.

In 2018, Erskine College announced return of the football program for the 2020 season competing in NCAA Division II.

== Conference affiliations ==
In 1915, Erskine began intercollegiate football and competed for the state title with other members of the South Carolina Intercollegiate Athletic Association. In 1925, Erskine joined the ranks of the Southern Intercollegiate Athletic Association. In 1939, Erskine was a founding member of the South Atlantic Conference, which was for "small liberal arts schools that do not place undue emphasis upon athletics." The conference's founding members were Erskine, Newberry, Oglethorpe, Presbyterian, and Wofford. They added Rollins and Stetson in 1940, and then Mercer in 1941 before it disbanded due to several programs discontinuing football. The schools maintained membership in the S.I.A.A. while also competing for the South Atlantic title. Erskine was also a member of the South Carolina Little Four alongside Newberry, Presbyterian, and Wofford. The "Little Four" informally was naming champions in the period before the war as well.

Years	Conference
1896	Independent
1897–1914	No intercollegiate team
1915–1924	South Carolina Intercollegiate Athletic Association
1925–1941	Southern Intercollegiate Athletic Association
1939–1941	South Atlantic Conference
1942–1945	No team (WWII)
1946–1951	South Carolina Little Four
1952–2018	No team
2019–2020	No intercollegiate competition (practice only)
2021	Independent
2022–2023	South Atlantic Conference
2024	Gulf South Conference
2025–present	Conference Carolinas

== Seasons ==
Year	Head coach	Conference	Overall record	Conference record
1896	John Walker	—	0–1	—
1897–1914	No football			
1915	Norman G. LaMotte	SCIAA	0–7–1	0–4
1916	Claude Moore	SCIAA	2–4	1–3
1917	Lucius H. Ranson	SCIAA	4–3	2–3
1918	Lieutenant F. C. Fishback	SCIAA	1–0–1	1–0–1
1919	Joe Lindsay (player-coach)	SCIAA	2–5	2–5
1920	David W. Parrish	SCIAA	5–3	1–3
1921	David W. Parrish	SCIAA	6–2	6–2♯
1922	David W. Parrish	SCIAA	0–8	0–7
1923	David W. Parrish	SCIAA	1–5	1–5
1924	Robert S. Galloway	SCIAA	1–7	0–5
1925	Robert S. Galloway	SIAA	1–6	0–4
1926	Dode Phillips	SIAA	1–7	0–4
1927	Dode Phillips	SIAA	2–4–1	1–2–1
1928	Jakie Todd	SIAA	3–7	1–5
1929	Jakie Todd	SIAA	7–3	3–2♮
1930	Jakie Todd	SIAA	2–5–1	1–2–1
1931	Jakie Todd	SIAA	2–6–3	1–5–1
1932	Jakie Todd	SIAA	1–8	0–5
1933	Jakie Todd	SIAA	2–7	1–5
1934	Jakie Todd	SIAA	1–8	0–4
1935	Jakie Todd	SIAA	2–6–1	0–4–1
1936	Jakie Todd	SIAA	4–6	3–1
1937	Jakie Todd	SIAA	6–4	5–0‡♯
1938	Jakie Todd	SIAA	1–7–2	0–3–1
1939	Jakie Todd	SIAA / SAC	1–9	1–5 / 1–3
1940	Jakie Todd	SIAA / SAC	1–8	0–5 / 0–5
1941	Jakie Todd / Dode Phillips•	SIAA / SAC	2–5	0–4 / 0–2
1942–1945	No football			
1946	Harry Bolick	Little Four	0–9	0–3
1947	John D. McMillan	Little Four	7–3	1–2
1948	John D. McMillan	Little Four	6–4	0–2
1949	John D. McMillan	Little Four	2–7	1–1
1950	John D. McMillan	Little Four	4–6	1–2
1951	John D. McMillan	Little Four	0–8–1	0–2–1
1952–2020	No football			
Spring 2021	Shap Boyd	Independent	1–5	—
2021	Shap Boyd	Independent	3–8	—
2022	Shap Boyd	SAC	2–9	0–9
2023	Shap Boyd	SAC	0–11	0–9
2024	Shap Boyd	GSC	1–8	0–6
2025	Shap Boyd	Carolinas	1–10	1–5

• = Interim head coach, † = Conference champions, ‡ = Conference co-champions, ♯ = Little Four champions, ♮ = Little Four co-champions
