= 2019 Drake Bulldogs football team =

American college football season

2019 Drake Bulldogs football
- Conference: Pioneer Football League
- Record: 6–5 (6–2 PFL)
- Head coach: Todd Stepsis (1st season)
- Offensive coordinator: Brad Pole (1st season)
- Defensive coordinator: Allen Smith (1st season)
- Home stadium: Drake Stadium

Uniform
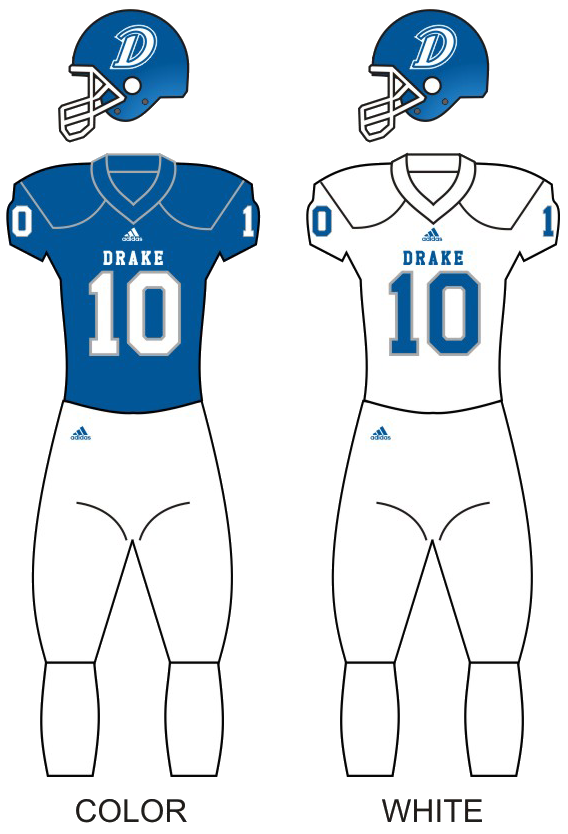

2019 Pioneer Football League standings
	Conf.			Overall
Team	W		L	W		L
San Diego $^	8	–	0	9	–	3
Dayton	6	–	2	8	–	3
Drake	6	–	2	6	–	5
Davidson	5	–	3	8	–	4
Stetson	4	–	4	7	–	4
Marist	4	–	4	4	–	7
Morehead State	3	–	5	5	–	7
Butler	2	–	6	3	–	9
Jacksonville	1	–	7	3	–	9
Valparaiso	1	–	7	1	–	11
$ – Conference champion; ^ – FCS playoff participant

The 2019 Drake Bulldogs football team represented Drake University as a member of the Pioneer Football League (PFL) during 2019 NCAA Division I FCS football season. Led by first-year head coach Todd Stepsis, the Bulldogs compiled an overall record of 6–5 with a mark of 6–2 in conference play, tying for second place in the PFL. The team played its home games at Drake Stadium in Des Moines, Iowa.

== Preseason ==
=== Coaching changes ===
In January 2019, it was announced that with the resignation of 5-year head coach Rick Fox, that defensive coordinator, Todd Stepsis would be promoted to head coach.

=== Preseason coaches' poll ===
The Pioneer League released their preseason coaches' poll on July 30, 2019. The Bulldogs were picked to finish in third place.

=== Preseason All–PFL teams ===
The Bulldogs had eleven players selected to the preseason all–PFL teams.

Offense

Second team

Steve Doran – WR

Grant Snow – OL

Defense

First team

Nathan Clayberg – DL

Gavin Dineen – DL

Kieran Severa – LB

Jabari Butler – DB

Will Warner – DB

Second team

Erin Morgan – DL

Connor Willis – LB

Sean Lynch – DB

Special teams

First team

Danny Donley – K

== Schedule ==
Date	Time	Opponent	Site	TV	Result	Attendance
August 31	4:00 p.m.	at North Dakota*	Alerus Center; Grand Forks, ND	MC22/Pluto TV	L 7–47	8,545
September 7	6:00 p.m.	Truman*	Drake Stadium; Des Moines, IA	MC22	L 7–10	2,529
September 14	1:00 p.m.	at No. 3 South Dakota State*	Dana J. Dykhouse Stadium; Brookings, SD	ESPN+	L 10–38	11,565
September 28	12:00 p.m.	at Marist	Tenney Stadium at Leonidoff Field; Poughkeepsie, NY	Red Fox Network	W 41–17	3,918
October 5	2:00 p.m.	Valparaiso	Drake Stadium; Des Moines, IA	MC22	W 35–6	3,060
October 12	12:00 p.m.	at Butler	Bud and Jackie Sellick Bowl; Indianapolis, IN	YouTube	W 42–7	2,578
October 26	1:00 p.m.	Morehead State	Drake Stadium; Des Moines, IA	MC22	W 36–17	2,134
November 2	4:00 p.m.	at San Diego	Torero Stadium; San Diego, CA	WCC Network via Stadium	L 7–49	1,556
November 9	1:00 p.m.	Jacksonville	Drake Stadium; Des Moines, IA	MC22	W 28–14	1,670
November 16	1:00 p.m.	Dayton	Drake Stadium; Des Moines, IA (rivalry)	MC22	L 29–46	1,767
November 23	12:00 p.m.	at Davidson	Richardson Stadium; Davidson, NC	Davidson All Access	W 31–28	1,243
*Non-conference game; Rankings from STATS Poll released prior to the game; All times are in Central time

== Game summaries ==
=== At North Dakota ===
	1	2	3	4	Total
Bulldogs	0	0	7	0	7
Fighting Hawks	10	2	21	14	47

=== Truman ===
	1	2	3	4	Total
Truman Bulldogs	0	3	7	0	10
DU Bulldogs	0	0	7	0	7

=== At South Dakota State ===
	1	2	3	4	Total
Bulldogs	0	3	0	7	10
No. 3 Jackrabbits	10	7	14	7	38

=== At Marist ===
	1	2	3	4	Total
Bulldogs	13	14	0	14	41
Red Foxes	0	3	7	7	17

=== Valparaiso ===
	1	2	3	4	Total
Crusaders	0	3	3	0	6
Bulldogs	0	21	14	0	35

=== At Butler ===
	1	2	3	4	Total
DU Bulldogs	7	14	21	0	42
BU Bulldogs	7	0	0	0	7

=== Morehead State ===
	1	2	3	4	Total
Eagles	7	3	0	7	17
Bulldogs	3	12	7	14	36

=== At San Diego ===
	1	2	3	4	Total
Bulldogs	0	0	7	0	7
Toreros	7	28	14	0	49

=== Jacksonville ===
	1	2	3	4	Total
Dolphins	7	0	0	7	14
Bulldogs	7	7	7	7	28

=== Dayton ===
	1	2	3	4	Total
Flyers	7	18	7	14	46
Bulldogs	14	8	0	7	29

=== At Davidson ===
	1	2	3	4	Total
Bulldogs	7	14	3	7	31
Wildcats	7	7	7	7	28
