= 2019 Butler Bulldogs football team =

American college football season

2019 Butler Bulldogs football
- Conference: Pioneer Football League
- Record: 3–9 (2–6 PFL)
- Head coach: Jeff Voris (14th season)
- Offensive coordinator: Kyle Conner (4th season)
- Defensive coordinator: Joe Cheshire (10th season)
- Home stadium: Bud and Jackie Sellick Bowl

Uniform
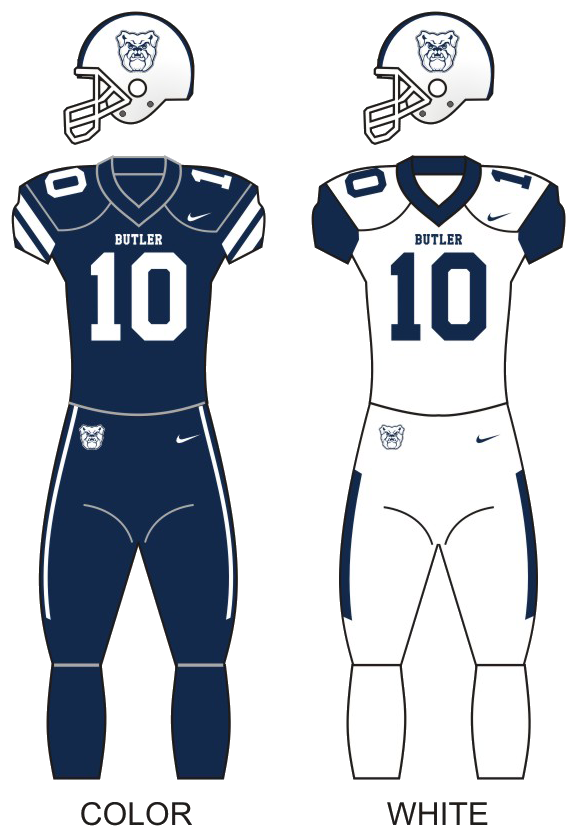

2019 Pioneer Football League standings
| | Conf. | | | Overall |
| Team | W | | L | W | | L |
|---|---|---|---|---|---|---|
| San Diego $^ | 8 | – | 0 | 9 | – | 3 |
| Dayton | 6 | – | 2 | 8 | – | 3 |
| Drake | 6 | – | 2 | 6 | – | 5 |
| Davidson | 5 | – | 3 | 8 | – | 4 |
| Stetson | 4 | – | 4 | 7 | – | 4 |
| Marist | 4 | – | 4 | 4 | – | 7 |
| Morehead State | 3 | – | 5 | 5 | – | 7 |
| Butler | 2 | – | 6 | 3 | – | 9 |
| Jacksonville | 1 | – | 7 | 3 | – | 9 |
| Valparaiso | 1 | – | 7 | 1 | – | 11 |
$ – Conference champion; ^ – FCS playoff participant

The 2019 Butler Bulldogs football team represented Butler University as a member of the Pioneer Football League (PFL) during the 2019 NCAA Division I FCS football season. Led by 14th-year head coach Jeff Voris, Bulldogs compiled an overall record of 3–9 with a mark of 2–6 in conference play, placing eighth in the PFL. Butler played home games at the Bud and Jackie Sellick Bowl in Indianapolis.

== Preseason ==
=== Preseason coaches' poll ===
The Pioneer League released their preseason coaches' poll on July 30, 2019. The Bulldogs were picked to finish in seventh place.

=== Preseason All-PFL teams ===
The Bulldogs had five different players selected to the preseason all–PFL teams.

Offense

First team

Pace Temple – WR

Second team

Tommy Kennedy – OL

Defense

Second team

Mason Brunner – LB

Luke Sennett – DB

Special teams

Second team

Drew Bevelhimer – K

Mason Brunner – LS

== Schedule ==
| Date | Time | Opponent | Site | TV | Result | Attendance |
|---|---|---|---|---|---|---|
| August 31 | 4:00 p.m. | vs. No. 1 North Dakota State* | Target Field; Minneapolis, MN | NBC ND, ESPN+ | L 10–57 | 34,544 |
| September 7 | 6:00 p.m. | Indiana Wesleyan* | Bud and Jackie Sellick Bowl; Indianapolis, IN | YouTube | W 30–27 ^{OT} | 5,255 |
| September 14 | 6:00 p.m. | Taylor* | Bud and Jackie Sellick Bowl; Indianapolis, IN | Facebook Live | L 14–17 | 3,267 |
| September 21 | 5:00 p.m. | at Princeton* | Powers Field at Princeton Stadium; Princeton, NJ | ESPN+ | L 7–49 | 10,625 |
| October 5 | 1:00 p.m. | at Stetson | Spec Martin Stadium; DeLand, FL | ESPN+ | L 27–30 | 1,364 |
| October 12 | 1:00 p.m. | Drake | Bud and Jackie Sellick Bowl; Indianapolis, IN | YouTube | L 7–42 | 2,578 |
| October 19 | 2:00 p.m. | at Morehead State | Jayne Stadium; Morehead, KY | ESPN+ | L 20–31 | 9,244 |
| October 26 | 1:00 p.m. | Jacksonville | Bud and Jackie Sellick Bowl; Indianapolis, IN | YouTube | W 24–14 | 3,484 |
| November 2 | 12:00 p.m. | at Marist | Tenney Stadium at Leonidoff Field; Poughkeepsie, NY | Red Fox Network | L 27–37 | 1,202 |
| November 9 | 12:00 p.m. | Davidson | Bud and Jackie Sellick Bowl; Indianapolis, IN | YouTube | L 10–52 | 2,815 |
| November 16 | 12:00 p.m. | Valparaiso | Bud and Jackie Sellick Bowl; Indianapolis, IN (Hoosier Helmet Trophy) | YouTube | W 24–21 | 2,194 |
| November 23 | 1:00 p.m. | at Dayton | Welcome Stadium; Dayton, OH | Facebook Live | L 38–51 | 1,991 |
*Non-conference game; Rankings from STATS Poll released prior to the game; All times are in Eastern time

== Game summaries ==
=== Vs. North Dakota State ===
| | 1 | 2 | 3 | 4 | Total |
|---|---|---|---|---|---|
| Bulldogs | 0 | 0 | 10 | 0 | 10 |
| No. 1 Bison | 15 | 21 | 14 | 7 | 57 |

=== Indiana Wesleyan ===
| | 1 | 2 | 3 | 4 | OT | Total |
|---|---|---|---|---|---|---|
| Wildcats | 7 | 10 | 0 | 7 | 3 | 27 |
| Bulldogs | 0 | 10 | 7 | 7 | 6 | 30 |

=== Taylor ===
| | 1 | 2 | 3 | 4 | Total |
|---|---|---|---|---|---|
| Trojans | 7 | 7 | 0 | 3 | 17 |
| Bulldogs | 0 | 7 | 0 | 7 | 14 |

=== At Princeton ===
| | 1 | 2 | 3 | 4 | Total |
|---|---|---|---|---|---|
| Bulldogs | 0 | 0 | 0 | 7 | 7 |
| Tigers | 14 | 28 | 7 | 0 | 49 |

=== At Stetson ===
| | 1 | 2 | 3 | 4 | Total |
|---|---|---|---|---|---|
| Bulldogs | 10 | 7 | 0 | 10 | 27 |
| Hatters | 14 | 0 | 3 | 13 | 30 |

=== Drake ===
| | 1 | 2 | 3 | 4 | Total |
|---|---|---|---|---|---|
| DU Bulldogs | 7 | 14 | 21 | 0 | 42 |
| BU Bulldogs | 7 | 0 | 0 | 0 | 7 |

=== At Morehead State ===
| | 1 | 2 | 3 | 4 | Total |
|---|---|---|---|---|---|
| Bulldogs | 0 | 7 | 7 | 6 | 20 |
| Eagles | 10 | 14 | 0 | 7 | 31 |

=== Jacksonville ===
| | 1 | 2 | 3 | 4 | Total |
|---|---|---|---|---|---|
| Dolphins | 14 | 0 | 0 | 0 | 14 |
| Bulldogs | 6 | 8 | 3 | 7 | 24 |

=== At Marist ===
| | 1 | 2 | 3 | 4 | Total |
|---|---|---|---|---|---|
| Bulldogs | 0 | 14 | 6 | 7 | 27 |
| Red Foxes | 10 | 10 | 0 | 17 | 37 |

=== Davidson ===
| | 1 | 2 | 3 | 4 | Total |
|---|---|---|---|---|---|
| Wildcats | 0 | 33 | 6 | 13 | 52 |
| Bulldogs | 3 | 0 | 0 | 7 | 10 |

=== Valparaiso ===
| | 1 | 2 | 3 | 4 | Total |
|---|---|---|---|---|---|
| Crusaders | 0 | 14 | 0 | 7 | 21 |
| Bulldogs | 0 | 7 | 7 | 10 | 24 |

=== At Dayton ===
| | 1 | 2 | 3 | 4 | Total |
|---|---|---|---|---|---|
| Bulldogs | 3 | 14 | 7 | 14 | 38 |
| Flyers | 17 | 21 | 10 | 3 | 51 |
