= 2019 Valparaiso Crusaders football team =

American college football season

2019 Valparaiso Crusaders football
- Conference: Pioneer Football League
- Record: 1–11 (1–7 PFL)
- Head coach: Landon Fox (1st season)
- Offensive coordinator: Chris Limbach (1st season)
- Defensive coordinator: Brian Dougherty (1st season)
- Home stadium: Brown Field

2019 Pioneer Football League standings
	Conf.			Overall
Team	W		L	W		L
San Diego $^	8	–	0	9	–	3
Dayton	6	–	2	8	–	3
Drake	6	–	2	6	–	5
Davidson	5	–	3	8	–	4
Stetson	4	–	4	7	–	4
Marist	4	–	4	4	–	7
Morehead State	3	–	5	5	–	7
Butler	2	–	6	3	–	9
Jacksonville	1	–	7	3	–	9
Valparaiso	1	–	7	1	–	11
$ – Conference champion; ^ – FCS playoff participant

The 2019 Valparaiso Crusaders football team represented Valparaiso University as a member of the Pioneer Football League (PFL) during the 2019 NCAA Division I FCS football season. Led by first-year head coach Landon Fox, the Crusaders compiled an overall record of 1–11 with a mark of 1–7 in conference play, tying for ninth place at the bottom of the PFL standings. The team played home games at Brown Field in Valparaiso, Indiana. 2019 was the program's centennial season.

== Schedule ==
Date	Time	Opponent	Site	TV	Result	Attendance
August 29	6:00 p.m.	at Eastern Kentucky*	Roy Kidd Stadium; Richmond, KY	ESPN+	L 7–53	11,130
September 14	1:00 p.m.	Central Connecticut*	Brown Field; Valparaiso, IN	ESPN+	L 13–42	2,110
September 21	3:00 p.m.	at Truman*	Stokes Stadium; Kirksville, MO	GLVCSN	L 7–38	3,087
September 28	1:00 p.m.	Charleston (WV)*^{†}	Brown Field; Valparaiso, IN	ESPN+	L 13–19	4,399
October 5	2:00 p.m.	at Drake	Drake Stadium; Des Moines, IA	Bulldog Vision	L 6–35	3,060
October 12	1:00 p.m.	Dayton	Brown Field; Valparaiso, IN	ESPN+	L 28-41	2,388
October 19	4:00 p.m.	at San Diego	Torero Stadium; San Diego, CA	WCC Network via Stadium	L 17–42	1,323
October 26	12:00 p.m.	Stetson	Brown Field; Valparaiso, IN	ESPN+	W 19–10	878
November 2	12:00 p.m.	at Davidson	Richardson Stadium; Davidson, NC	ESPN+	L 21–27	3,849
November 9	1:00 p.m.	Morehead State	Brown Field; Valparaiso, IN	ESPN+	L 21–27	1,477
November 16	11:00 a.m.	at Butler	Bud and Jackie Sellick Bowl; Indianapolis, IN (Hoosier Helmet Trophy)	YouTube	L 21–24	2,194
November 23	1:00 p.m.	Marist	Brown Field; Valparaiso, IN	ESPN+	L 14–26	1,088
*Non-conference game; ^{†}Homecoming; All times are in Central time

== Preseason ==
=== Preseason coaches' poll ===
The Pioneer League released their preseason coaches' poll on July 30, 2019. The Crusaders were picked to finish tied for ninth place.

=== Preseason All–PFL teams ===
The Crusaders had two players selected to the preseason all–PFL teams.

Defense

First team

Drew Snouffer – LB

Special teams

Second team

Bailey Gessinger – RS

== Game summaries ==
=== At Eastern Kentucky ===
Team	1	2	3	4	Total
Crusaders	0	0	7	0	7
• Colonels	15	17	7	14	53

- Date: August 29, 2019
- Location: Roy Kidd Stadium • Richmond, Kentucky
- Game start: 7:05 pm EDT
- Elapsed time: 2:59
- Game attendance: 11,130
- Game weather: Temperature: 79-80°F • Weather: Sunny, 40% humidity • Wind: 6 mph
- Referee: Daniel Ingram
- TV announcers (ESPN+): Greg Stotelmyer, Jim Tirey

=== Central Connecticut ===
Team	1	2	3	4	Total
• Blue Devils	0	14	21	7	42
Crusaders	6	0	7	0	13

- Date: August 29, 2019
- Location: Brown Field • Valparaiso, Indiana
- Game start: 1:04 pm CDT
- Game attendance: 2,110
- Game weather: Temperature: 76°F • Weather: Sunny, perfect day • Wind: SW 8 mph
- Referee: Jason Berg
- TV announcers (ESPN+): Todd Ickow, Dave Huseman

=== At Truman ===
Team	1	2	3	4	Total
Crusaders	0	0	0	7	7
• Bulldogs	10	7	21	0	38

- Date: September 21, 2019
- Location: Stokes Stadium • Kirksville, Missouri
- Game start: 3:00 pm, moved up from 7:00 pm due to forecast thunderstorms CDT
- Elapsed time: 2:42
- Game attendance: 3,087
- Game weather: Temperature: 80°F • Weather: Overcast/Rain • Wind: W 15–25 mph
- Referee: Craig Demaree
- TV announcers (GLVCSN): Brad Boyer, Eric Duick, Kevin White, Hank Janssen

=== Charleston (WV) ===
Team	1	2	3	4	Total
• Golden Eagles	7	3	6	3	19
Crusaders	7	6	0	0	13

- Date: September 28, 2019
- Location: Brown Field • Valparaiso, Indiana
- Game start: 1:04 pm CDT
- Elapsed time: 2:49
- Game attendance: 4,399
- Game weather: Temperature: 68°F • Weather: Cloudy • Wind: N 8 mph
- Referee: Craig Demaree
- TV announcers (ESPN+): Todd Ickow, Dave Huseman

=== At Drake ===
Team	1	2	3	4	Total
Crusaders	0	3	3	0	6
• Bulldogs	0	21	14	0	35

- Location: Drake Stadium • Des Moines, Iowa
- Game start: 2:00 pm CDT
- Elapsed time: 2:47
- Game attendance: 3,060
- Game weather: Temperature: 58°F • Weather: Cloudy • Wind: N 8 mph
- Referee: Michael Hoffman
- TV announcers (Bulldog Vision):

=== Dayton ===
	1	2	3	4	Total
Flyers	14	7	13	7	41
Crusaders	7	0	14	7	28

=== At San Diego ===
	1	2	3	4	Total
Crusaders	3	0	14	0	17
Toreros	7	21	14	0	42

=== Stetson ===
	1	2	3	4	Total
Hatters	10	0	0	0	10
Crusaders	3	10	6	0	19

=== At Davidson ===
	1	2	3	4	Total
Crusaders	0	6	7	8	21
Wildcats	7	7	7	6	27

=== Morehead State ===
	1	2	3	4	Total
Eagles	14	0	0	13	27
Crusaders	0	0	14	7	21

=== At Butler ===
	1	2	3	4	Total
Crusaders	0	14	0	7	21
Bulldogs	0	7	7	10	24

=== Marist ===
	1	2	3	4	Total
Red Foxes	7	9	0	10	26
Crusaders	0	8	0	6	14
