= 2019 Marist Red Foxes football team =

American college football season

2019 Marist Red Foxes football
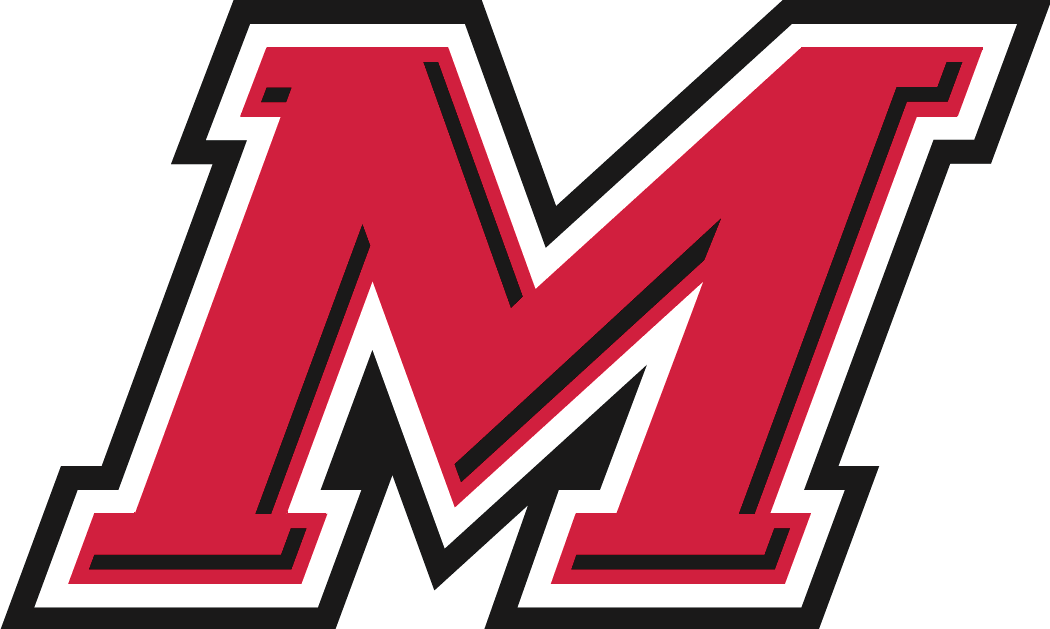
- Conference: Pioneer Football League
- Record: 4–7 (4–4 PFL)
- Head coach: Jim Parady (28th season)
- Offensive coordinator: Jake Dembow (1st season)
- Defensive coordinator: Scott Rumsey (19th season)
- Home stadium: Tenney Stadium at Leonidoff Field

2019 Pioneer Football League standings
	Conf.			Overall
Team	W		L	W		L
San Diego $^	8	–	0	9	–	3
Dayton	6	–	2	8	–	3
Drake	6	–	2	6	–	5
Davidson	5	–	3	8	–	4
Stetson	4	–	4	7	–	4
Marist	4	–	4	4	–	7
Morehead State	3	–	5	5	–	7
Butler	2	–	6	3	–	9
Jacksonville	1	–	7	3	–	9
Valparaiso	1	–	7	1	–	11
$ – Conference champion; ^ – FCS playoff participant

The 2019 Marist Red Foxes football team represented Marist College as a member of the Pioneer Football League (PFL) during the 2019 NCAA Division I FCS football season. Led by 28th-year head coach Jim Parady, the Red Foxes compiled an overall record of 4–7 with a mark of 4–4 in conference play, tying for fifth place in the PFL. Marist played home games at Tenney Stadium at Leonidoff Field in Poughkeepsie, New York.

== Schedule ==
Date	Time	Opponent	Site	TV	Result	Attendance
September 7	12:30 p.m.	at Georgetown*	Cooper Field; Washington, DC	Stadium	L 3–43	3,336
September 14	12:00 p.m.	Stetson	Tenney Stadium at Leonidoff Field; Poughkeepsie, NY	Red Fox Network	W 26–23	1,456
September 21	12:00 p.m.	Cornell*	Tenney Stadium at Leonidoff Field; Poughkeepsie, NY	Red Fox Network	L 7–21	2,157
September 28	1:00 p.m.	Drake	Tenney Stadium at Leonidoff Field; Poughkeepsie, NY	Red Fox Network	L 17–41	3,918
October 5	5:00 p.m.	at San Diego	Torero Stadium; San Diego, CA	WCC Network	L 7–31	2,763
October 19	12:00 p.m.	No. 21 Dartmouth*	Tenney Stadium at Leonidoff Field; Poughkeepsie, NY	Red Fox Network	L 7–49	1,188
October 26	1:00 p.m.	at Davidson	Richardson Stadium; Davidson, NC	Davidson All Access	W 27–21	4,144
November 2	12:00 p.m.	Butler	Tenney Stadium at Leonidoff Field; Poughkeepsie, NY	Red Fox Network	W 37–27	1,202
November 9	1:00 p.m.	at Dayton	Welcome Stadium; Dayton, OH	Facebook Live	L 35–59	2,001
November 16	12:00 p.m.	Jacksonville	Tenney Stadium at Leonidoff Field; Poughkeepsie, NY	Red Fox Network	L 45–52 ^{2OT}	1,396
November 23	2:00 p.m.	at Valparaiso	Brown Field; Valparaiso, IN	ESPN+	W 26–14	1,088
*Non-conference game; Rankings from STATS Poll released prior to the game; All times are in Eastern time

== Preseason ==
=== Preseason coaches' poll ===
The Pioneer League released their preseason coaches' poll on July 30, 2019. The Red Foxes were picked to finish in fourth place.

=== Preseason All–PFL teams ===
The Red Foxes had four players selected to the preseason all–PFL teams.

Offense

First team

Juston Christian – WR

Defense

First team

Willie Barrett – LB

Brandon Miller – DB

Second team

Enmanuel Soriano – DL

== Game summaries ==
=== At Georgetown ===
	1	2	3	4	Total
Red Foxes	0	3	0	0	3
Hoyas	7	15	21	0	43

=== Stetson ===
	1	2	3	4	Total
Hatters	7	3	7	6	23
Red Foxes	12	7	0	7	26

=== Cornell ===
	1	2	3	4	Total
Big Red	7	7	7	0	21
Red Foxes	0	7	0	0	7

=== Drake ===
	1	2	3	4	Total
Bulldogs	13	14	0	14	41
Red Foxes	0	3	7	7	17

=== At San Diego ===
	1	2	3	4	Total
Red Foxes	0	7	0	0	7
Toreros	7	14	0	10	31

=== Dartmouth ===
	1	2	3	4	Total
No. 21 Big Green	14	21	7	7	49
Red Foxes	0	0	0	7	7

=== At Davidson ===
	1	2	3	4	Total
Red Foxes	7	3	14	3	27
Wildcats	0	7	0	14	21

=== Butler ===
	1	2	3	4	Total
Bulldogs	0	14	6	7	27
Red Foxes	10	10	0	17	37

=== At Dayton ===
	1	2	3	4	Total
Red Foxes	7	7	7	14	35
Flyers	7	21	17	14	59

=== Jacksonville ===
	1	2	3	4	OT	2OT	Total
Dolphins	14	3	7	14	7	7	52
Red Foxes	7	7	7	17	7	0	45

=== At Valparaiso ===
	1	2	3	4	Total
Red Foxes	7	9	0	10	26
Crusaders	0	8	0	6	14
