= Shap Boyd =

American football coach (born c. 1963)

Current position
- Title: Head coach
- Team: Erskine
- Conference: Carolinas
- Record: 8–51

Biographical details
- Born: c. 1963 (age 62–63); Hampton, Virginia, U.S.
- Education: The University of the South (1985); Middle Tennessee State University (1987); University of Kentucky (1988)

Playing career
- 1981–1984: Sewanee

Coaching career (HC unless noted)
- 1988: Middle Tennessee (GA)
- 1989: Kentucky (GA)
- 1989–1990: Sewanee (assistant)
- 1991–1992: Lycoming (assistant)
- 1993–1994: Lock Haven (assistant)
- 1995–1998: Lake Highland Prep (FL) (DC)
- 1999–2003: Jacksonville (ST/S)
- 2004–2006: Washington University (DC/DB)
- 2007–2013: Muskingum (AHC/DC)
- 2014–2015: Southeastern (ST/DB)
- 2016–2018: Virginia–Wise (DC/S)
- 2019–present: Erskine

Head coaching record
- Overall: 8–51

Shap Boyd (born c. 1963) is an American college football coach. He is the head football coach for Erskine College, a position he has held since 2019 when the school reinstated football as a varsity sport. He also coached for Middle Tennessee, Kentucky, Sewanee, Lycoming, Lock Haven, Lake Highland Preparatory School, Jacksonville, Washington University, Muskingum, Southeastern, and Virginia–Wise. He played college football for Sewanee.

== Head coaching record ==
Year	Team	Overall	Conference	Standing	Bowl/playoffs
Erskine Flying Fleet (NCAA Division II independent) (2020–2021)
2020–21	Erskine	1–5			
2021	Erskine	3–8			
Erskine Flying Fleet (South Atlantic Conference) (2022–2023)
2022	Erskine	2–9	0–9	6th (Mountain)	
2023	Erskine	0–11	0–8	6th (Mountain)	
Erskine Flying Fleet (Gulf South Conference) (2024)
2024	Erskine	1–8	0–6	8th	
Erskine Flying Fleet (Conference Carolinas) (2025–present)
2025	Erskine	1–10	1–5	T–6th	
Erskine:		8–51	1–23		
Total:		8–51			
