= Steve Gilbert (American football) =

American football coach

Biographical details
- Born: c. 1957

Playing career
- late 1970s: West Chester

Coaching career (HC unless noted)
- ?: Penn (assistant)
- 1984–1987: Washington University (OC)
- 1988–1996: Ursinus
- 1998–2006: Jacksonville

Head coaching record
- Overall: 76–102
- Tournaments: 0–1 (NCAA D-III playoffs)

Accomplishments and honors

Championships
- 1 Centennial (1996); 2 PFL South Division (2001, 2004)

Steve Gilbert (born c. 1957) is an American former college football coach. He served as the head football coach at Ursinus College in Collegeville, Pennsylvania from 1988 to 1996 and Jacksonville University in Jacksonville, Florida from 1998 to 2006, compiling a career college football coaching record of 76–102. Gilbert was the first head coach in the history of the Jacksonville Dolphins football program.

Gilbert played college football at West Chester University. He was an assistant coach at the University of Pennsylvania and then offensive coordinator at Washington University in St. Louis for four seasons before he was hired as head football coach at Ursinus in 1988.

== Head coaching record ==
| Year | Team | Overall | Conference | Standing | Bowl/playoffs |
|---|---|---|---|---|---|
Ursinus Bears (Centennial Conference) (1988–1996)
| 1988 | Ursinus | 3–7 | 3–4 | 5th | |
| 1989 | Ursinus | 5–5 | 3–4 | T–4th | |
| 1990 | Ursinus | 4–5 | 2–5 | T–6th | |
| 1991 | Ursinus | 5–5 | 3–4 | T–4th | |
| 1992 | Ursinus | 4–6 | 2–5 | 7th | |
| 1993 | Ursinus | 5–4 | 4–3 | T–3rd | |
| 1994 | Ursinus | 3–7 | 3–4 | T–5th | |
| 1995 | Ursinus | 3–7 | 1–6 | 7th | |
| 1996 | Ursinus | 9–2 | 7–0 | 1st | L NCAA Division III First Round |
| Ursinus: | | 41–48 | 28–35 | | |
Jacksonville Dolphins (NCAA Division I-AA independent) (1998–2000)
| 1998 | Jacksonville | 4–5 | | | |
| 1999 | Jacksonville | 3–6 | | | |
| 2000 | Jacksonville | 3–8 | | | |
Jacksonville Dolphins (Pioneer Football League) (2001–2006)
| 2001 | Jacksonville | 6–5 | 3–0 | T–1st (South) | |
| 2002 | Jacksonville | 3–7 | 0–3 | 4th (South) | |
| 2003 | Jacksonville | 5–6 | 1–2 | T–2nd (South) | |
| 2004 | Jacksonville | 3–7 | 2–1 | T–1st (South) | |
| 2005 | Jacksonville | 4–4 | 2–1 | 2nd (South) | |
| 2006 | Jacksonville | 4–6 | 4–3 | 4th | |
| Jacksonville: | | 35–54 | 12–10 | | |
| Total: | | 76–102 | | | |
National championship Conference title Conference division title or championship game berth
