= San Diego Toreros football =

American college football team

2026 San Diego Toreros football team
- First season: 1956; 70 years ago
- Athletic director: Bill McGillis
- Head coach: Brandon Moore; 3rd season, 20–14 (.588)
- Location: San Diego, California
- Stadium: Torero Stadium (capacity: 6,000)
- NCAA division: Division I FCS
- Conference: Pioneer Football League
- Colors: Navy, white, and Toreros blue
- All-time record: 354–242–7 (.593)

Conference championships
- PFL: 2005, 2006, 2007, 2011, 2012, 2014, 2015, 2016, 2017, 2018, 2019

Division championships
- PFL North: 2003, 2005
- Consensus All-Americans: 41
- Rivalries: Cal Poly
- Website: USDToreros.com

The San Diego Toreros football team is the college football program that represents the University of San Diego (USD). The Toreros compete in NCAA Division I (FCS) as a member of the Pioneer Football League (PFL). The team plays its home games at Torero Stadium.

San Diego's first football team was fielded in 1956. The Toreros have won the PFL championship 12 times.

== History ==
=== Classifications ===
- 1973–1992: NCAA Division III
- 1993–present: NCAA Division I-AA/FCS

=== Conference memberships ===
- 1956–1972: Independent
- 1973–1992: NCAA Division III independent
- 1993–present: Pioneer Football League

In the early 1990s, the NCAA passed new legislation which required athletic departments to now play all of their respective sports at the same divisional level. Briefly discussed as a potential answer to the legislation, the concept of Division I-AAA was considered in response, including USD as one of only six schools eligible for the classification along the West Coast (along with Santa Clara, CSUN, Sacramento State, Saint Mary's and UCSB).

However, in January 1992, the proposal to create a football-playing Division I-AAA was twice voted down at an NCAA convention; then in February 1992, Toreros athletic director Tom Iannacone announced USD football would elevate to I-AA status beginning in the fall of 1993, by way of joining the PFL.

== Rivalries ==
=== Cal Poly ===
San Diego Toreros and Cal Poly have a regional rivalry, both schools are in-state FCS opponents but not in the same conferences.

== Notable former players ==
Notable alumni include:

- Jamal Agnew
- Eric Bakhtiari
- Ross Dwelley
- Michael Gasperson
- Evan Hlavacek
- Josh Johnson
- Matt Maslowski
- John Matthews
- Jordan Paopao
- Vern Valdez
- Ken Zampese
- Dave Dunn
- Michael Bandy

== Year-by-year results ==
Year	Wins	Loss	Ties	Win %	Coach	Conference
1956	2	3	0	.400	Gil Kuhn	Independent
1957	6	3	0	.667	Bob McCutcheon	Independent
1958	8	2	0	.800	Bob McCutcheon	Independent
1959	1	5	0	.167	Paul Platz	Independent
1960	4	5	1	.450	Mike Pecarovich	Independent
1961	2	8	0	.200	Mike Pecarovich	Independent
1969	5	2	0	.714	Jim Gray	Independent
1970	2	6	0	.250	Jim Gray	Independent
1971	3	5	0	.375	Jim Gray	Independent
1972	6	3	1	.650	Andy Vinci	Independent
1973	9	2	1	.792	Andy Vinci	Independent (NCAA Division III)
1974	3	8	0	.273	Dick Logan	Independent (NCAA Division III)
1975	2	7	0	.222	Dick Logan	Independent (NCAA Division III)
1976	1	7	1	.167	Bill Williams	Independent (NCAA Division III)
1977	3	7	0	.300	Bill Williams	Independent (NCAA Division III)
1978	7	3	0	.700	Bill Williams	Independent (NCAA Division III)
1979	5	6	0	.455	Bill Williams	Independent (NCAA Division III)
1980	6	5	0	.545	Bill Williams	Independent (NCAA Division III)
1981	9	1	0	.900	Bill Williams	Independent (NCAA Division III)
1982	4	6	0	.400	Bill Williams	Independent (NCAA Division III)
1983	5	5	0	.500	Brian Fogarty	Independent (NCAA Division III)
1984	1	8	1	.150	Brian Fogarty	Independent (NCAA Division III)
1985	5	5	0	.500	Brian Fogarty	Independent (NCAA Division III)
1986	4	6	0	.400	Brian Fogarty	Independent (NCAA Division III)
1987	6	3	1	.650	Brian Fogarty	Independent (NCAA Division III)
1988	5	4	0	.556	Brian Fogarty	Independent (NCAA Division III)
1989	7	2	0	.778	Brian Fogarty	Independent (NCAA Division III)
1990	7	2	0	.778	Brian Fogarty	Independent (NCAA Division III)
1991	7	3	0	.700	Brian Fogarty	Independent (NCAA Division III)
1992	7	2	1	.750	Brian Fogarty	Independent (NCAA Division III)
1993	6	4	0	.600	Brian Fogarty	Pioneer Football League (NCAA Division I FCS)
1994	6	4	0	.600	Brian Fogarty	Pioneer Football League (NCAA Division I FCS)
1995	5	5	0	.500	Brian Fogarty	Pioneer Football League (NCAA Division I FCS)
1996	4	6	0	.400	Kevin McGarry	Pioneer Football League (NCAA Division I FCS)
1997	8	3	0	.727	Kevin McGarry	Pioneer Football League (NCAA Division I FCS)
1998	2	8	0	.200	Kevin McGarry	Pioneer Football League (NCAA Division I FCS)
1999	5	5	0	.500	Kevin McGarry	Pioneer Football League (NCAA Division I FCS)
2000	4	6	0	.400	Kevin McGarry	Pioneer Football League (NCAA Division I FCS)
2001	6	3	0	.667	Kevin McGarry	Pioneer Football League (NCAA Division I FCS)
2002	5	5	0	.500	Kevin McGarry	Pioneer Football League (NCAA Division I FCS)
2003	8	2	0	.800	Kevin McGarry	Pioneer Football League (NCAA Division I FCS)
2004	7	4	0	.636	Jim Harbaugh	Pioneer Football League (NCAA Division I FCS)
2005	11	1	0	.917	Jim Harbaugh	Pioneer Football League (NCAA Division I FCS)
2006	11	1	0	.917	Jim Harbaugh	Pioneer Football League (NCAA Division I FCS)
2007	9	2	0	.818	Ron Caragher	Pioneer Football League (NCAA Division I FCS)
2008	9	2	0	.818	Ron Caragher	Pioneer Football League (NCAA Division I FCS)
2009	4	7	0	.364	Ron Caragher	Pioneer Football League (NCAA Division I FCS)
2010	5	6	0	.455	Ron Caragher	Pioneer Football League (NCAA Division I FCS)
2011	9	2	0	.818	Ron Caragher	Pioneer Football League (NCAA Division I FCS)
2012	8	3	0	.727	Ron Caragher	Pioneer Football League (NCAA Division I FCS)
2013	8	3	0	.727	Dale Lindsey	Pioneer Football League (NCAA Division I FCS)
2014	9	3	0	.750	Dale Lindsey	Pioneer Football League (NCAA Division I FCS)
2015	9	2	0	.818	Dale Lindsey	Pioneer Football League (NCAA Division I FCS)
2016	10	2	0	.833	Dale Lindsey	Pioneer Football League (NCAA Division I FCS)
2017	10	3	0	.769	Dale Lindsey	Pioneer Football League (NCAA Division I FCS)
2018	9	3	0	.750	Dale Lindsey	Pioneer Football League (NCAA Division I FCS)
2019	9	3	0	.750	Dale Lindsey	Pioneer Football League (NCAA Division I FCS)
2020	4	2	0	.667	Dale Lindsey	Pioneer Football League (NCAA Division I FCS)
2021	7	4	0	.636	Dale Lindsey	Pioneer Football League (NCAA Division I FCS)
2022	5	5	0	.500	Dale Lindsey	Pioneer Football League (NCAA Division I FCS)
2023	4	7	0	.333	Brandon Moore	Pioneer Football League (NCAA Division I FCS)
2024	8	3	0	.727	Brandon Moore	Pioneer Football League (NCAA Division I FCS)
2025	8	4	0	.667	Brandon Moore	Pioneer Football League (NCAA Division I FCS)
Totals	354	242	6	.593	Brandon Moore	Pioneer Football League (NCAA Division I FCS)

== Championships ==
=== Conference championships ===
Year	Conference	Coach	Overall record	Conference record
2005	Pioneer Football League	Jim Harbaugh	11–1	4–0
2006	Pioneer Football League	Jim Harbaugh	11–1	7–0
2007†	Pioneer Football League	Ron Caragher	9–2	6–1
2011†	Pioneer Football League	Ron Caragher	9–2	7–1
2012†	Pioneer Football League	Ron Caragher	8–3	7–1
2014†	Pioneer Football League	Dale Lindsey	9–3	7–1
2015†	Pioneer Football League	Dale Lindsey	9–2	7–1
2016	Pioneer Football League	Dale Lindsey	10–2	8–0
2017	Pioneer Football League	Dale Lindsey	10–3	8–0
2018	Pioneer Football League	Dale Lindsey	9–3	8–0
2019	Pioneer Football League	Dale Lindsey	9–3	8–0

† Co-champions

=== Divisional championships ===
From 2001–2005, the Pioneer Football League was divided into North and South Divisions. As winners of the Pioneer Football League's North Division, San Diego has made one appearance in the Pioneer Football League Championship Game, in 2005. The Toreros also shared the Division title with Valparaiso in 2003, but the tie-breaker allowed the Crusaders to represent the division in the championship game.

Year	Division Championship	Opponent	CG result
2003†	PFL North	N/A lost tiebreaker to Valparaiso	
2005	PFL North	Morehead State	W 47–40

== Playoff appearances ==
=== NCAA Division I FCS ===
The Toreros have made five appearances in the FCS playoffs. Their overall record is 2–5.

Year	Round	Opponent	Result
2014	First Round	Montana	L, 14–52
2016	First Round; Second Round	Cal Poly; North Dakota State	W, 35–21; L, 7–45
2017	First Round; Second Round	Northern Arizona; North Dakota State	W, 41–10; L, 3–38
2018	First Round	Nicholls	L, 30–49
2019	First Round	Northern Iowa	L, 3–17
Playoff record		2–5	

=== NCAA Division III ===
The Toreros made one appearances in the NCAA Division III football playoffs, with a combined record of 0–1.

Year	Round	Opponent	Result
1973	Semifinals	Wittenberg	L, 14–21

== Future non-conference opponents ==
Announced schedules as of August 27, 2026.

2026	2027	2028	2029
UC Davis	at UC Davis	at Cal Poly	at Idaho State
at Idaho State	Cal Poly	Idaho State	Cal Poly
at Cal Poly	at Southern Utah	at UC Davis	
