= Jacksonville Dolphins football =

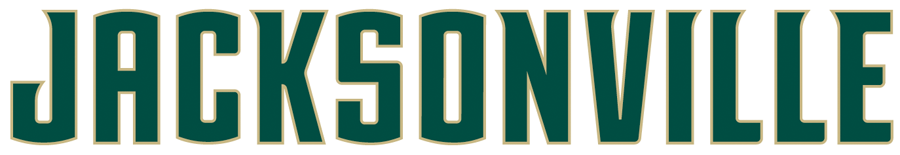
- First season: 1998; 28 years ago
- Last season: 2019; 7 years ago
- Stadium: D. B. Milne Field (capacity: 5,000)
- Location: Jacksonville, Florida
- NCAA division: Division I FCS
- Conference: Pioneer Football League
- All-time record: 118–115 (.506)

Claimed national championships
- 0

Conference championships
- 2 (2008, 2010)

Conference division championships
- 2 (2001, 2004)
- Colors: Green and white
- Mascot: Dunkin
- Website: JUDolphins.com

The Jacksonville Dolphins football program was the intercollegiate American football team for Jacksonville University located in the U.S. state of Florida. The team competed in the NCAA Division I Football Championship Subdivision (FCS) and were members of the Pioneer Football League. The team played its home games at the 5,000 seat D. B. Milne Field in Jacksonville, Florida. On December 3, 2019, the university announced it would discontinue its football program, effective immediately.

== Conference affiliations ==
- Division I Independent (1998–2000)
- Pioneer Football League (2001–2019)

== Bowl games ==
Season	Bowl	Champion		Runner-Up	
2008	Gridiron Classic	Albany	28	Jacksonville	0

== Awards ==
Pioneer Football League Offensive Freshman of the Year

- Josh McGregor, QB, 2008

Pioneer Football League Defensive Player of the Year

- Tyrone Wright, DB, 2001

Pioneer Football League Coach of the Year

- Kerwin Bell, 2008

== Notable former players ==
- Ryan Silverfield - 35th Head Coach of the Arkansas Razorback Football Team
- Justin Horton - NFL player
- Kelvin Jenkins Arena Football League Player
- Dallas Jackson - Arena Football League player
- Andy Jones - NFL player
- E. J. Nduka - Arena Football League player, and All Elite Wrestling (AEW) professional wrestler
- Billy Peach - CFL player
- Micah Ross - played basketball and football at JU, playing in 1998 on the football team. Became the first former JU football player to play in the NFL, appearing with the Jacksonville Jaguars, San Diego Chargers and Carolina Panthers.
- Lin-J Shell - CFL player
- Jon Terrell - quarterback later known as comedian Jay Thomas
- Will Weatherford - played defensive end at Jacksonville. Speaker of the House of Florida.

== Championships ==
=== Conference championships ===
Year	Conference	Coach	Overall record	Conference record
2008	Pioneer Football League	Kerwin Bell	9–4	7–1
2010	Pioneer Football League (Co-championship)	Kerwin Bell	10–1	8–0
Total conference championships			3

=== Divisional championships ===
From 2001–2005, the Pioneer Football League was divided into North and South Divisions. As winners of the Pioneer Football League's South Division, Jacksonville has made one appearance in the Pioneer Football League Championship Game, in 2001. The Dolphins also shared the Division title with Morehead State in 2004, but the tie-breaker allowed the Eagles to represent the division in the championship game.

Year	Division Championship	CG Result	Opponent	PF	PA
2001	PFL South	L	Dayton	14	46
2004	PFL South (Co-championship)	NA	Did Not Play (lost tiebreaker to Morehead State)	X	X
Totals	2	0–1	-	14	46
