= D. B. Milne Field =

Multi-purpose stadium

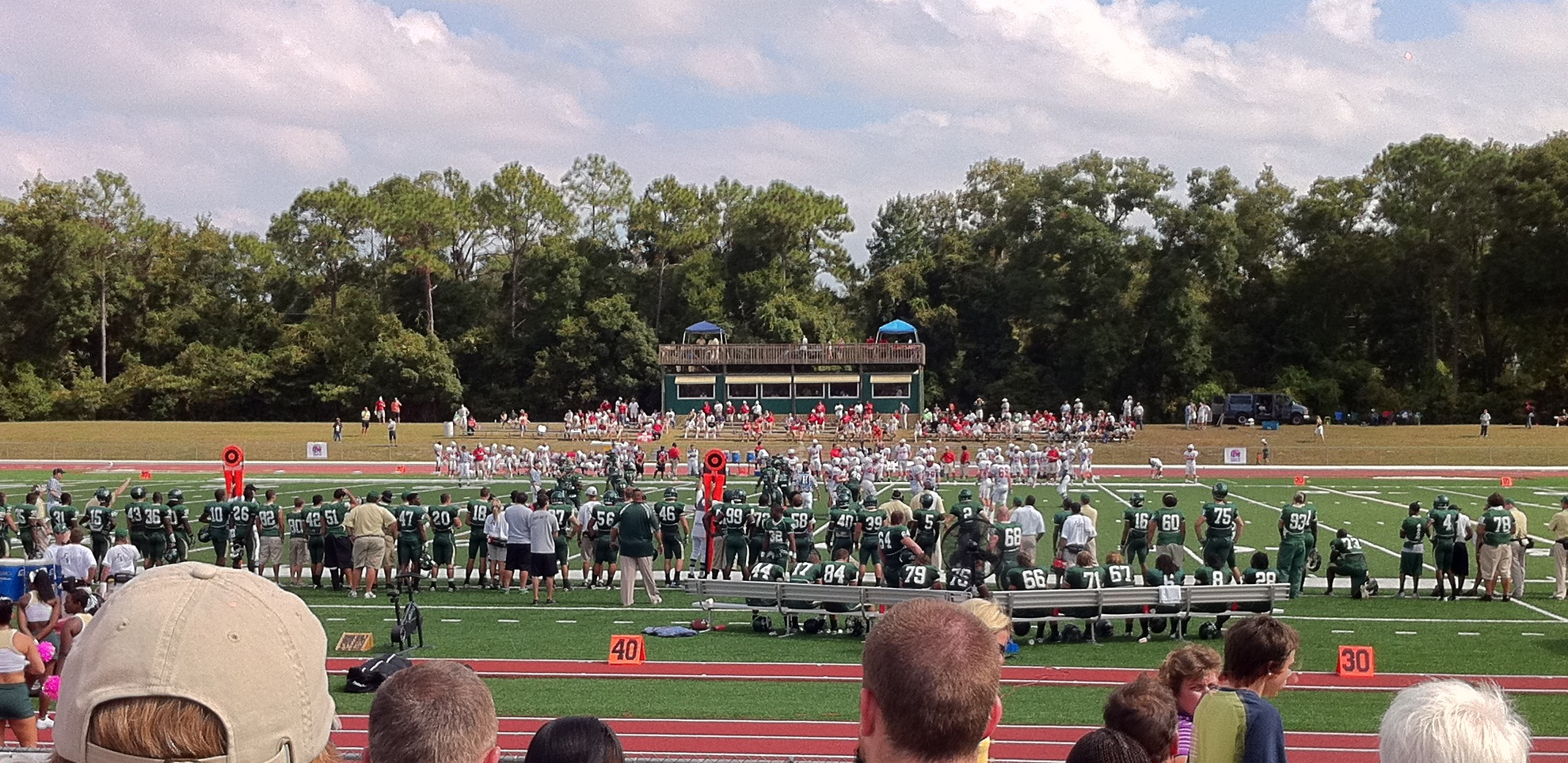
- Interactive map of D. B. Milne Field
- Location: 2800 University Blvd N, Jacksonville, Florida
- Coordinates: 30.3568843°N 81.605476°W
- Owner: Jacksonville University
- Operator: Jacksonville University
- Capacity: 5,000

Construction
- Built: 1997
- Opened: 1998
- Renovated: 2010, 2014
- Cost: $1,000,000

Tenant
- Jacksonville University Dolphins (1998–2019)

D. B. Milne Field is a multi-purpose stadium on the campus of Jacksonville University in Jacksonville, Florida. It was home to the Jacksonville Dolphins college football team. The facility has a seating capacity of 5,000 and opened in 1998.

== History ==
=== Renovations ===
A new AstroTurf playing surface was installed prior to the 2010 football season.

In May 2014, construction began on renovations to D. B. Milne Field. Upgrades to the facility included a 2,500 seat grandstand and a state-of-the-art press box. Other renovations included a new concessions area with additional bathrooms and field accommodations for lacrosse, track and intramurals. With the scheduled upgrades, more lights were added around the stadium, as well as the installation of a new scoreboard.

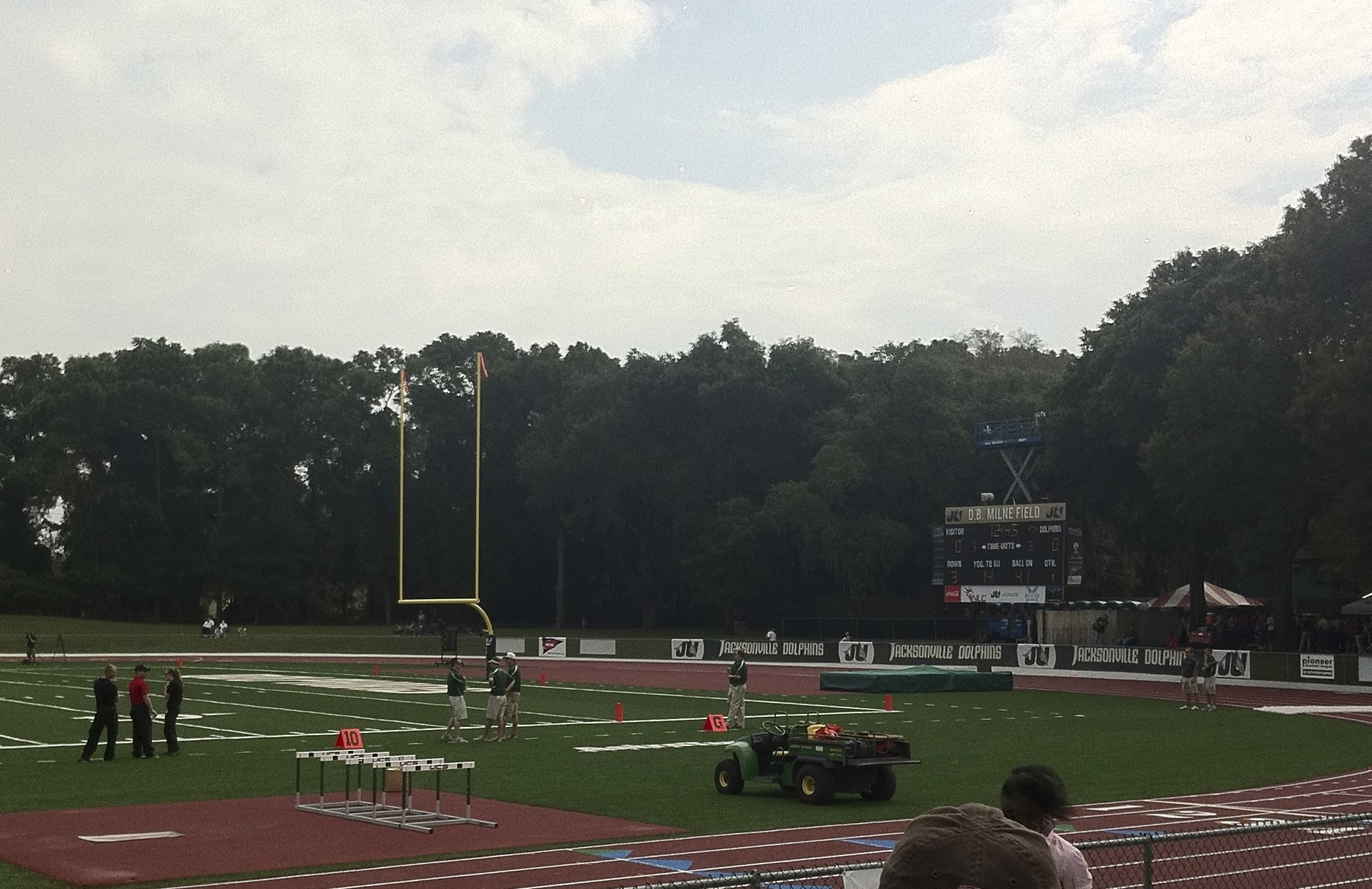
D. B. Milne Field endzone and scoreboard
