= 2021 NCAA Division I FCS football season =

American college football season

2021 NCAA Division I FCS season

Regular season
- Number of teams: 128
- Duration: August 28 – November 27
- Payton Award: Eastern Washington quarterback Eric Barriere
- Buchanan Award: Florida A&M defensive end Isaiah Land

Playoff
- Duration: November 27 – December 18
- Championship date: January 8, 2022
- Championship site: Toyota Stadium, Frisco, Texas
- Champion: North Dakota State

NCAA Division I FCS football seasons
- «2020 2022»

The 2021 NCAA Division I FCS football season, part of college football in the United States, was organized by the National Collegiate Athletic Association (NCAA) at the Division I Football Championship Subdivision (FCS) level.

After the prior season was impacted by the COVID-19 pandemic in the United States, resulting in some conferences canceling their seasons and significant rescheduling by other conferences, the 2021 season returned to its traditional fall scheduling. The season ended with a single-elimination tournament, with the championship game held on January 8, 2022 at Toyota Stadium in Frisco, Texas. North Dakota State won its ninth championship in eleven seasons, defeating Montana State, 38-10, for the title.

== Conference changes and new programs ==
- The Western Athletic Conference (WAC), which had last played football in the 2012 season as an FBS league, reinstated football for the 2021 season at the FCS level. The ASUN Conference also announced in 2021 that it would sponsor FCS football in the future.
- Because WAC and ASUN programs reclassifying from Division II could not be counted toward the minimum of six members required for a conference champion to be an automatic qualifier (AQ) for the FCS postseason, the two conferences pooled their seven members with active FCS programs in 2021 (four WAC, three ASUN) to form the WAC–ASUN Challenge, a temporary league also referred to as the AQ7.

School	2020-21 conference	2021 conference
Abilene Christian	Southland	WAC–ASUN Challenge (WAC)
Bethune–Cookman	MEAC	SWAC
Central Arkansas	Southland	WAC–ASUN Challenge (ASUN)
Dixie State	FCS Independent	WAC
Eastern Kentucky	Ohio Valley	WAC–ASUN Challenge (ASUN)
Florida A&M	MEAC	SWAC
Jacksonville State	Ohio Valley	WAC–ASUN Challenge (ASUN)
Lamar	Southland	WAC–ASUN Challenge (WAC)
North Carolina A&T	MEAC	Big South
Presbyterian	FCS independent	Pioneer
St. Thomas (MN)	MIAC (D-III)	Pioneer (FCS)
Sam Houston State	Southland	WAC–ASUN Challenge (WAC)
Stephen F. Austin	Southland	WAC–ASUN Challenge (WAC)
Tarleton State	FCS Independent	WAC

== Notable headlines ==
- September 4 – In Kevin Kelley's debut as head coach of Presbyterian, Ren Hefley threw for 10 touchdowns in the Blue Hose's 84–43 win over NAIA member St. Andrews, breaking the previous FCS record of 9 first set in 1984 by Willie Totten of Mississippi Valley State and equaled in 2007 by Drew Hubel of Portland State. Blue Hose backup quarterback Tyler Huff added 2 TD passes to set a new Division I team record (for both FCS and FBS) of 12, surpassing the previous record of 11 thrown by David Klingler of Houston against Eastern Washington in 1990.
- November 12 – The Utah Legislature approved changing the name of FCS member Dixie State University to Utah Tech University, effective in the 2022–23 academic year.

== FCS team wins over FBS teams ==
Italics denotes FBS teams.

Date	Visiting team	Home team	Site	Result	Attendance	Ref.
September 2	No. 23 UC Davis	Tulsa	Skelly Field at H. A. Chapman Stadium • Tulsa, Oklahoma	19–17	15,085	
September 2	No. 11 Eastern Washington	UNLV	Allegiant Stadium • Paradise, Nevada	35–33 ^{2OT}	21,970	
September 3	No. 3 South Dakota State	Colorado State	Canvas Stadium • Fort Collins, Colorado	42–23	32,327	
September 4	Holy Cross	UConn	Pratt & Whitney Stadium at Rentschler Field • East Hartford, Connecticut	38–28	18,782	
September 4	No. 9 Montana	No. 20 (FBS) Washington	Husky Stadium • Seattle, Washington	13–7	64,053	
September 4	East Tennessee State	Vanderbilt	Vanderbilt Stadium • Nashville, Tennessee	23–3	22,029	
September 11	Duquesne	Ohio	Peden Stadium • Athens, Ohio	28–26	19,411	
September 11	No. 16 Jacksonville State	Florida State	Doak Campbell Stadium • Tallahassee, Florida	20–17	60,198	
September 18	Incarnate Word	Texas State	Bobcat Stadium • San Marcos, Texas	42–34	16,107	
September 18	Northern Arizona	Arizona	Arizona Stadium • Tucson, Arizona	21–19	33,481	
November 6	Rhode Island	UMass	Warren McGuirk Alumni Stadium • Hadley, Massachusetts	35–22	7,284	
November 13	Maine	UMass	Warren McGuirk Alumni Stadium • Hadley, Massachusetts	35–10	5,331	
^{#}Rankings from STATS poll released prior to the game.

== Conference standings ==
2021 Big Sky Conference football standings
	Conf.			Overall
Team	W		L	W		L
No. 10 Sacramento State $^	8	–	0	9	–	3
No. 2 Montana State ^	7	–	1	11	–	3
No. 7 Eastern Washington ^	6	–	2	10	–	3
No. 6 Montana ^	6	–	2	10	–	3
No. 17 UC Davis ^	5	–	3	8	–	4
Weber State	5	–	3	6	–	5
Northern Arizona	4	–	4	5	–	6
Portland State	4	–	4	5	–	6
Idaho	3	–	5	4	–	7
Northern Colorado	2	–	6	3	–	8
Cal Poly	1	–	7	2	–	9
Idaho State	1	–	7	1	–	10
Southern Utah	0	–	8	1	–	10
$ – Conference champion; ^ – FCS playoff participant; Rankings from STATS Poll

2021 Big South Conference football standings
	Conf.			Overall
Team	W		L	W		L
No. 11 Kennesaw State $^	7	–	0	11	–	2
Monmouth	6	–	1	7	–	4
North Carolina A&T	3	–	4	5	–	6
North Alabama	3	–	4	3	–	8
Charleston Southern	3	–	4	4	–	6
Hampton	3	–	4	5	–	6
Robert Morris	3	–	5	4	–	6
Campbell	2	–	5	3	–	8
Gardner–Webb	2	–	5	4	–	7
$ – Conference champion; ^ – FCS playoff participant; Rankings from STATS Poll

2021 Colonial Athletic Association football standings
	Conf.			Overall
Team	W		L	W		L
No. 3 James Madison +^	7	–	1	12	–	2
No. 8 Villanova +^	7	–	1	10	–	3
Elon	5	–	3	6	–	5
Rhode Island	4	–	4	7	–	4
Maine	4	–	4	6	–	5
Richmond	4	–	4	6	–	5
William & Mary	4	–	4	6	–	5
Stony Brook	4	–	4	5	–	6
Delaware	3	–	5	5	–	6
Towson	3	–	5	4	–	7
New Hampshire	2	–	6	3	–	8
Albany	1	–	7	2	–	9
+ – Conference co-champions; ^ – FCS playoff participant; Rankings from STATS Poll

2021 Ivy League football standings
	Conf.			Overall
Team	W		L	W		L
No. 20 Dartmouth +	6	–	1	9	–	1
No. 24 Princeton +	6	–	1	9	–	1
Harvard	5	–	2	8	–	2
Yale	4	–	3	5	–	5
Columbia	4	–	3	7	–	3
Penn	1	–	6	3	–	7
Brown	1	–	6	2	–	8
Cornell	1	–	6	2	–	8
+ – Conference co-champions; Rankings from STATS Poll

2021 Mid-Eastern Athletic Conference football standings
	Conf.			Overall
Team	W		L	W		L
South Carolina State $	5	–	0	7	–	5
North Carolina Central	4	–	1	6	–	5
Delaware State	2	–	3	5	–	6
Norfolk State	2	–	3	6	–	5
Howard	1	–	4	3	–	8
Morgan State	1	–	4	2	–	9
$ – Conference champion

2021 Missouri Valley Football Conference standings
	Conf.			Overall
Team	W		L	W		L
No. 1 North Dakota State $^	7	–	1	14	–	1
No. 14 Missouri State ^	6	–	2	8	–	4
No. 16 Southern Illinois ^	5	–	3	8	–	5
No. 18 South Dakota ^	5	–	3	7	–	5
No. 4 South Dakota State ^	5	–	3	11	–	4
No. 23 Northern Iowa ^	4	–	4	6	–	6
Indiana State	3	–	5	5	–	6
North Dakota	3	–	5	5	–	6
Western Illinois	2	–	6	2	–	9
Illinois State	2	–	6	4	–	7
Youngstown State	2	–	6	3	–	7
$ – Conference champion; ^ – FCS playoff participant; Rankings from STATS Poll

2021 Northeast Conference football standings
	Conf.			Overall
Team	W		L	W		L
Sacred Heart $^	6	–	1	8	–	4
Duquesne	5	–	2	7	–	3
Bryant	5	–	2	7	–	4
Central Connecticut	4	–	3	4	–	7
Saint Francis (PA)	4	–	3	5	–	6
Merrimack *	2	–	5	5	–	6
LIU	2	–	5	2	–	8
Wagner	0	–	7	0	–	11
$ – Conference champion; ^ – FCS playoff participant; Note: Merrimack ineligible for NEC title and FCS postseason play due to transition from NCAA Division II

2021 Ohio Valley Conference football standings
	Conf.			Overall
Team	W		L	W		L
No. 13 UT Martin $^	5	–	1	10	–	3
Southeast Missouri State	4	–	2	4	–	7
Austin Peay	4	–	2	6	–	5
Tennessee State	3	–	3	5	–	6
Murray State	3	–	3	6	–	5
Eastern Illinois	1	–	5	1	–	10
Tennessee Tech	1	–	5	3	–	8
$ – Conference champion; ^ – FCS playoff participant; Rankings from STATS Poll

2021 Patriot League football standings
	Conf.			Overall
Team	W		L	W		L
No. 19 Holy Cross $^	6	–	0	10	–	3
Colgate	5	–	1	5	–	6
Fordham	4	–	2	6	–	5
Lehigh	3	–	3	3	–	8
Lafayette	2	–	4	3	–	8
Georgetown	1	–	5	2	–	8
Bucknell	0	–	6	1	–	10
$ – Conference champion; ^ – FCS playoff participant; Rankings from STATS Poll

2021 Pioneer Football League standings
	Conf.			Overall
Team	W		L	W		L
Davidson +^	7	–	1	8	–	3
San Diego +	7	–	1	7	–	4
St. Thomas (MN) *	6	–	2	7	–	3
Morehead State	6	–	2	7	–	4
Marist	5	–	3	5	–	5
Dayton	5	–	3	6	–	4
Valparaiso	4	–	4	4	–	7
Stetson	2	–	6	4	–	7
Drake	1	–	7	2	–	9
Butler	1	–	7	3	–	8
Presbyterian	0	–	8	2	–	9
+ – Conference co-champions; ^ – FCS playoff participant; * – St. Thomas (MN) ineligible for FCS postseason play due to transition from NCAA Division III

2021 Southern Conference football standings
	Conf.			Overall
Team	W		L	W		L
No. 9 East Tennessee State $^	7	–	1	11	–	2
Mercer	6	–	2	7	–	3
Chattanooga	5	–	3	6	–	5
Western Carolina	4	–	4	4	–	7
Furman	4	–	4	6	–	5
VMI	4	–	4	6	–	5
Samford	3	–	5	4	–	7
The Citadel	3	–	5	4	–	7
Wofford	0	–	8	1	–	10
$ – Conference champion; ^ – FCS playoff participant; Rankings from STATS Poll

2021 Southland Conference football standings
	Conf.			Overall
Team	W		L	W		L
No. 12 Incarnate Word $^	7	–	1	10	–	3
No. 15 Southeastern Louisiana ^	6	–	2	9	–	4
Nicholls	5	–	3	6	–	5
McNeese State *	3	–	5	4	–	7
Northwestern State	3	–	5	3	–	8
Houston Baptist	0	–	8	0	–	11
$ – Conference champion; ^ – FCS playoff participant; * – Ineligible for FCS postseason play due to NCAA sanctions; Rankings from STATS Poll

2021 Southwestern Athletic Conference football standings
	Conf.			Overall
Team	W		L	W		L
East Division
No. 22 Jackson State x$	8	–	0	11	–	2
No. 25 Florida A&M ^	7	–	1	9	–	3
Alabama A&M	5	–	3	7	–	3
Mississippi Valley State	3	–	5	4	–	7
Alabama State	3	–	5	5	–	6
Bethune–Cookman	2	–	6	2	–	9
West Division
Prairie View A&M x	6	–	2	7	–	5
Alcorn State	5	–	3	6	–	5
Grambling State	3	–	5	4	–	7
Southern	3	–	5	4	–	7
Texas Southern	2	–	6	2	–	8
Arkansas–Pine Bluff	1	–	7	2	–	9
Championship: Jackson State 27, Prairie View A&M 10
$ – Conference champion; x – Division champion/co-champions; y – Championship game participant; ^ – FCS playoff participant; Rankings from STATS Poll

2021 WAC–ASUN Challenge football standings
	Conf.			Overall
Team	W		L	W		L
No. 5 Sam Houston $^	6	–	0	11	–	1
No. 21 Stephen F. Austin ^	4	–	2	8	–	4
Eastern Kentucky	4	–	2	7	–	4
Central Arkansas	3	–	3	5	–	6
Jacksonville State	3	–	3	5	–	6
Abilene Christian	1	–	5	5	–	6
Lamar	0	–	6	1	–	9
$ – Conference champion; ^ – FCS playoff participant; Rankings from STATS Poll

2021 Western Athletic Conference football standings
	Conf.			Overall
Team	W		L	W		L
No. 5 Sam Houston $^	5	–	0	11	–	1
No. 21 Stephen F. Austin ^	4	–	1	8	–	4
Abilene Christian	2	–	2	5	–	6
Tarleton State *	2	–	3	6	–	5
Dixie State *	0	–	3	1	–	10
Lamar	0	–	4	1	–	9
$ – Conference champion; ^ – FCS playoff participant; * – Ineligible for FCS playoffs due to transition from Division II; Rankings from STATS Poll

== Playoff qualifiers ==
=== Automatic berths for conference champions ===
Conference	Team	Appearance	Last bid	Result of last appearance
Big Sky Conference	Sacramento State	2nd	2019	Second Round (L – Austin Peay)
Big South Conference	Kennesaw State	4th	2019	Second Round (L – Weber State)
Colonial Athletic Association	Villanova	14th	2019	First Round (L – Southeastern Louisiana)
Missouri Valley Football Conference	North Dakota State	12th	2020	Quarterfinals (L – Sam Houston State)
Northeast Conference	Sacred Heart	4th	2020	First Round (L – Delaware)
Ohio Valley Conference	UT Martin	2nd	2006	Second Round (L – Southern Illinois)
Patriot League	Holy Cross	4th	2020	First Round (L – South Dakota State)
Pioneer Football League	Davidson	2nd	2020	First Round (L – Jacksonville State)
Southern Conference	East Tennessee State	3rd	2018	First Round (L – Jacksonville State)
Southland Conference	Incarnate Word	2nd	2018	First Round (L – Montana State)
Western Athletic Conference	Sam Houston State	13th	2020	National champions (W – South Dakota State)

=== At large qualifiers ===
Conference	Team	Appearance	Last bid	Result of last appearance
Big Sky Conference	Eastern Washington	15th	2020	First Round (L – North Dakota State)
Big Sky Conference	Montana	25th	2019	Quarterfinals (L – Weber State)
Big Sky Conference	Montana State	11th	2019	Semifinals (L – North Dakota State)
Big Sky Conference	UC Davis	2nd	2018	Quarterfinals (L – Eastern Washington)
Colonial Athletic Association	James Madison	18th	2020	Semifinals (L – Sam Houston State)
Missouri Valley Football Conference	Missouri State	3rd	2020	First Round (L – North Dakota)
Missouri Valley Football Conference	Northern Iowa	23rd	2019	Quarterfinals (L – James Madison)
Missouri Valley Football Conference	South Dakota	2nd	2017	Second Round (L – Sam Houston State)
Missouri Valley Football Conference	South Dakota State	11th	2020	Championship Game (L – Sam Houston State)
Missouri Valley Football Conference	Southern Illinois	10th	2020	Quarterfinals (L – South Dakota State)
Southland Conference	Southeastern Louisiana	4th	2019	Second Round (L – Montana)
Southwestern Athletic Conference	Florida A&M	8th	2001	First Round (L – Georgia Southern)
Western Athletic Conference	Stephen F. Austin	8th	2014	First Round (L – Northern Iowa)

=== Abstentions ===
- Ivy League – Dartmouth
- Mid-Eastern Athletic Conference – South Carolina State
- Southwestern Athletic Conference – Jackson State

== Postseason ==
After the prior season's playoffs were reduced to a 16-team bracket, FCS returned to a 24-team bracket for this season: 11 of the teams were decided via automatic bids issued to conference champions (listed above) and 13 teams were determined via at-large bids; the top eight teams were seeded.

=== Bowl game ===
Date	Game	Site	Television	Participants	Affiliations	Results	References
Dec. 18	Celebration Bowl	Mercedes-Benz Stadium; Atlanta, Georgia; 12:00 pm	ABC	South Carolina State Bulldogs (6–5); Jackson State Tigers (11–1)	MEAC; SWAC	South Carolina State 31; Jackson State 10	

=== NCAA Division I playoff bracket ===
First Round; November 27; Campus sites
Stephen F. Austin	28
Incarnate Word	35
UT Martin	32
Missouri State	31
Sacred Heart	10
Holy Cross	13
UC Davis	24
South Dakota State	56
Florida A&M	14
Southeastern Louisiana	38
Northern Iowa	9
Eastern Washington	19
Davidson	21
Kennesaw State	48
Southern Illinois	22
South Dakota	10

Second Round; December 3/4; Campus sites
1	Sam Houston State	49
Incarnate Word	42
8	Montana State	26
UT Martin	7
5	Villanova	21
Holy Cross	16
4	Sacramento State	19
South Dakota State	24
3	James Madison	59
Southeastern Louisiana	20
6	Montana	57
Eastern Washington	41
7	East Tennessee State	32
Kennesaw State	31
2	North Dakota State	38
Southern Illinois	7

Quarterfinals; December 10/11; Campus sites
1	Sam Houston State	19
8	Montana State	42
5	Villanova	21
South Dakota State	35
3	James Madison	28
6	Montana	6
7	East Tennessee State	3
2	North Dakota State	27

Semifinals; December 17/18; Campus sites
8	Montana State	31
South Dakota State	17
3	James Madison	14
2	North Dakota State	20

National Championship; January 8; 12:00 pm EST; Toyota Stadium, Frisco, Texas
8	Montana State	10
2	North Dakota State	38

== Rankings ==
The top 25 from the Stats Perform and USA Today Coaches Polls.

=== Pre-season polls ===
Stats Perform
Ranking	Team
1	Sam Houston State (39)
2	James Madison (8)
3	South Dakota State (4)
4	North Dakota State
5	Delaware
6	Weber State
7	Southern Illinois
8	North Dakota
9	Montana
10	Jacksonville State
11	Eastern Washington
12	Montana State
13	Monmouth
14	Central Arkansas
15	Southeastern Louisiana
16	Villanova
17	VMI
18	Chattanooga
19	Kennesaw State
20	Austin Peay
21	Northern Iowa
22	Nicholls
23	UC Davis
24	Missouri State
25	North Carolina A&T

USA Today Coaches
Ranking	Team
1	Sam Houston State (18)
2	James Madison (9)
3	North Dakota State
4	South Dakota State (1)
5	Delaware
6	Weber State
7	North Dakota
8	Jacksonville State
9	Montana
10	Southern Illinois
11	Montana State
12	Monmouth
13	Central Arkansas
14	Eastern Washington
15	Villanova
16	Northern Iowa
17	Southeastern Louisiana
18	Chattanooga
19	VMI
20	Kennesaw State
21	UC Davis
22	Richmond
23	Nicholls
24	North Carolina A&T
25	Austin Peay

=== Final rankings ===
Rank	Stats Perform	Coaches' Poll
1	North Dakota State (14–1) (50)	North Dakota State (14–1) (24)
2	Montana State (12–3)	Montana State (12–3)
3	James Madison (12–2)	James Madison (12–2)
4	South Dakota State (11–4)	Sam Houston State (11–1)
5	Sam Houston State (11–1)	South Dakota State (11–4)
6	Montana (10–3)	Montana (10–3)
7	Eastern Washington (10–3)	East Tennessee State (11–2)
8	Villanova (10–3)	Villanova (10–3)
9	East Tennessee State (11–2)	Eastern Washington (10–3)
10	Sacramento State (9–3)	Kennesaw State (11–2)
11	Kennesaw State (11–2)	Sacramento State (9–3)
12	Incarnate Word (10–3)	UT Martin (10–3)
13	UT Martin (10–3)	Incarnate Word (10–3)
14	Missouri State (8–4)	Missouri State (8–4)
15	Southeastern Louisiana (9–4)	Southeastern Louisiana (9–4)
16	Southern Illinois (8–5)	UC Davis (8–4)
17	UC Davis (8–4)	Southern Illinois (8–5)
18	South Dakota (7–5)	Stephen F. Austin (8–4)
19	Holy Cross (10–3)	Jackson State (11–2)
20	Dartmouth (9–1)	South Dakota (7–5)
21	Stephen F. Austin (8–4)	Princeton (9–1)
22	Jackson State (11–2)	Holy Cross (10–3)
23	Northern Iowa (6–6)	Dartmouth (9–1)
24	Princeton (9–1)	Florida A&M (9–3)
25	Florida A&M (9–3)	Northern Iowa (6–6)

== Kickoff games ==
The regular season began with three games on Saturday, August 28:

- Indiana State 26, Eastern Illinois 21
- MEAC/SWAC Challenge at Center Parc Stadium in Atlanta: North Carolina Central 23, Alcorn State 14
- San Jose State (FBS) 45, Southern Utah 14

== Regular season top 10 matchups ==
Rankings reflect the Stats Perform Poll.

- Week 3
  - No. 3 James Madison defeated No. 9 Weber State, 37–24 (Stewart Stadium, Ogden, Utah)
- Week 5
  - No. 6 Eastern Washington defeated No. 4 Montana, 30–24 (Roos Field, Cheney, Washington)
  - No. 5 North Dakota State defeated No. 10 North Dakota, 16–10 (Alerus Center, Grand Forks, North Dakota)
- Week 6
  - No. 8 Southern Illinois defeated No. 2 South Dakota State, 42–41 ^{OT} (Dana J. Dykhouse Stadium, Brookings, South Dakota)
- Week 10
  - No. 4 Montana State defeated No. 5 Eastern Washington, 23–20 (Roos Field, Cheney, Washington)
  - No. 9 South Dakota State defeated No. 2 North Dakota State, 27–19 (Dana J. Dykhouse Stadium, Brookings, South Dakota)
- Week 11
  - No. 7 Eastern Washington defeated No. 6 UC Davis, 38–20 (UC Davis Health Stadium, Davis, California)
- Week 12
  - No. 6 Montana defeated No. 3 Montana State, 29–10 (Washington–Grizzly Stadium, Missoula, Montana)

== Upsets ==
This section lists instances of unranked teams defeating ranked teams during the season.

=== Regular season ===
During the regular season, 33 unranked teams have defeated a ranked team.

- September 4, 2021:
  - Furman 29, No. 25 North Carolina A&T 18
- September 11, 2021:
  - Merrimack 35, No. 24 Holy Cross 21
- September 25, 2021
  - Holy Cross 45, No. 20 Monmouth 15
  - Eastern Kentucky 35, No. 19 Austin Peay 27
  - UT Martin 34, No. 9 Jacksonville State 31
- October 2, 2021
  - Elon 20, No. 22 Richmond 7
  - The Citadel 35, No. 18 VMI 24
- October 9, 2021
  - Idaho State 27, No. 7 UC Davis 17
  - South Dakota 20, No. 13 North Dakota 13
  - Youngstown State 41, No. 16 Missouri State 33
- October 16, 2021
  - Dartmouth 38, No. 23 New Hampshire 21
  - Chattanooga 21, No. 10 East Tennessee State 16
  - Sacramento State 28, No. 5 Montana 27
  - Stony Brook 34, No. 14 Delaware 17
  - Towson 28, No. 12 Rhode Island 7
- October 22, 2021
  - Columbia 19, No. 25 Dartmouth 0
- October 23, 2021
  - Weber State 35, No. 2 Eastern Washington 34
  - Illinois State 20, No. 15 South Dakota 14
  - McNeese State 28, No. 16 Incarnate Word 20
- October 30, 2021
  - William & Mary 31, No. 4 Villanova 18
  - Maine 45, No. 24 Rhode Island 24
- November 5, 2021
  - Dartmouth 31, No. 20т Princeton 7
- November 6, 2021
  - Portland State 30, No. 24 Weber State 18
  - Delaware 24, No. 20т William & Mary 3
  - Illinois State 17, No. 13 Northern Iowa 10 ^{OT}
  - Stephen F. Austin 31, No. 25 Eastern Kentucky 17
- November 13, 2021
  - Alcorn State 31, No. 24 Prairie View A&M 29
  - Furman 37, No. 21 VMI 31
  - Mercer 10, No. 22т Chattanooga 6
- November 20, 2021
  - Southeast Missouri State 31, No. 13 UT Martin 14
  - Nicholls 45, No. 15 Southeastern Louisiana 42
  - Youngstown State 35, No. 17 Southern Illinois 18
  - Elon 43, No. 25 Rhode Island 28

== Coaching changes ==
=== Preseason and in-season ===
This is restricted to coaching changes that took place on or after May 1, 2021. For coaching changes that occurred earlier in 2021, see 2020 NCAA Division I FCS end-of-season coaching changes.

Team	Outgoing coach	Date	Reason	Replacement
Stetson	Roger Hughes	May 7, 2021	Resigned	Brian Young
Colgate	Dan Hunt	May 17, 2021	Resigned	Stan Dakosty
LIU	Bryan Collins	June 29, 2021	Resigned	Jonathan Gill (interim)
Alabama State	Donald Hill-Eley	November 1, 2021	Fired	Travis Pearson (interim)
Jacksonville State	John Grass	November 6, 2021	Resigned	Maxwell Thurmond (interim)
Grambling State	Broderick Fobbs	November 15, 2021	Fired	Terrence Graves (interim)

=== End of season ===
Team	Outgoing coach	Date	Reason	Replacement
Western Illinois	Jared Elliott	November 10, 2021	Parted ways at end of season	Myers Hendrickson
Southern Utah	Demario Warren	November 15, 2021	Mutually parted ways	DeLane Fitzgerald
Idaho	Paul Petrino	November 19, 2021	Will not return in 2022	Jason Eck
Abilene Christian	Adam Dorrel	November 21, 2021	Fired	Keith Patterson
Idaho State	Rob Phenicie	November 21, 2021	Fired	Charlie Ragle
Lafayette	John Garrett	November 22, 2021	Fired	John Troxell
Alabama State	Travis Pearson (interim)	November 26, 2021	Permanent replacement	Eddie Robinson
Maine	Nick Charlton	November 28, 2021	Became OC at UConn	Jordan Stevens
Delaware	Danny Rocco	November 29, 2021	Fired	Ryan Carty
Jacksonville State	Maxwell Thurmond (interim)	November 29, 2021	Permanent replacement	Rich Rodriguez
Butler	Jeff Voris	November 30, 2021	Resigned	Mike Uremovich
New Hampshire	Sean McDonnell	December 1, 2021	Retired	Ricky Santos
Presbyterian	Kevin Kelley	December 4, 2021	Resigned	Steve Englehart
Incarnate Word	Eric Morris	December 5, 2021	Became OC at Washington State	G. J. Kinne
McNeese State	Frank Wilson	December 7, 2021	Became associate head coach at LSU	Gary Goff
Southern	Jason Rollins (interim)	December 7, 2021	Permanent replacement	Eric Dooley
Prairie View A&M	Eric Dooley	December 7, 2021	Hired by Southern	Bubba McDowell
Grambling State	Terrence Graves (interim)	December 10, 2021	Permanent replacement	Hue Jackson
East Tennessee State	Randy Sanders	December 13, 2021	Retired	George Quarles
LIU	Jonathan Gill (interim)	January 3, 2022	Permanent replacement	Ron Cooper
Eastern Illinois	Adam Cushing	January 11, 2022	Became OL coach at Duke	Chris Wilkerson
Morgan State	Tyrone Wheatley	February 12, 2022	Became RB coach for Denver Broncos	Damon Wilson

== See also ==
- 2021 NCAA Division I FBS football season
- 2021 NCAA Division II football season
- 2021 NCAA Division III football season
- 2021 NAIA football season
- 2021 U Sports football season
