= 2021 UConn Huskies football team =

American college football season

2021 UConn Huskies football
- Conference: Independent
- Record: 1–11
- Head coach: Randy Edsall (16th season; first 2 games); Lou Spanos (interim; final 10 games)
- Offensive coordinator: Frank Giufre (2nd season)
- Offensive scheme: Multiple
- Defensive coordinator: Lou Spanos (2nd season; first 2 games); Jarren Horton (1st season)
- Base defense: 4–3
- Home stadium: Pratt & Whitney Stadium at Rentschler Field

2021 NCAA Division I FBS independents football records
	Conf.			Overall
Team	W		L	W		L
No. 8 Notre Dame		–		11	–	2
No. 19 BYU		–		10	–	3
Army		–		9	–	4
Liberty		–		8	–	5
New Mexico State		–		2	–	10
UMass		–		1	–	11
UConn		–		1	–	11
Rankings from AP Poll

The 2021 UConn Huskies football team represented the University of Connecticut (UConn) as an independent during the 2021 NCAA Division I FBS football season. Led by Randy Edsall, in his 16th and final season as head coach, for the first two games of the season and then Lou Spanos as interim head coach for the remainder of the year, the Huskies compiled an overall record of 1–11. The team played home games at Pratt & Whitney Stadium at Rentschler Field in East Hartford, Connecticut.

On September 5, following the team's 38–28 loss to NCAA Division I Football Championship Subdivision (FCS) member Holy Cross, head coach Edsall announced he would be retiring at the end of the season. The following day, the school announced that Edsall had resigned effective immediately and defensive coordinator Lou Spanos was named the interim head coach.

On November 11, former UCLA coach Jim L. Mora was hired the UConn's 31st head football coach beginning with the 2022 season. Shortly after the hire, he helped serve as an offensive assistant for the remainder of the season.

In June 2020, it was announced that UConn's other sports programs would be joining the Big East Conference. Since the Big East did not sponsor football and the American did not want to keep UConn as a football-only school, it was decided that the football program would compete as an independent. The move to the Big East was primarily due to the university wanting to focus more on the men's and women's basketball programs, feeling the American had hindered those programs.

== Schedule ==
Date	Time	Opponent	Site	TV	Result	Attendance
August 28	2:00 p.m.	at Fresno State	Bulldog Stadium; Fresno, CA	CBSSN	L 0–45	26,043
September 4	12:00 p.m.	Holy Cross	Pratt & Whitney Stadium at Rentschler Field; East Hartford, CT	CBSSN	L 28–38	18,782
September 11	3:00 p.m.	Purdue	Pratt & Whitney Stadium at Rentschler Field; East Hartford, CT	CBSSN	L 0–49	14,817
September 18	12:00 p.m.	at Army	Michie Stadium; West Point, NY	CBSSN	L 21–52	25,030
September 25	3:30 p.m.	Wyoming	Pratt & Whitney Stadium at Rentschler Field; East Hartford, CT	CBSSN	L 22–24	12,538
October 2	7:30 p.m.	at Vanderbilt	Vanderbilt Stadium; Nashville, TN	ESPNU	L 28–30	21,218
October 9	3:30 p.m.	at UMass	Warren McGuirk Alumni Stadium; Hadley, MA (rivalry)	NESN	L 13–27	12,765
October 16	12:00 p.m.	Yale	Pratt & Whitney Stadium at Rentschler Field; East Hartford, CT	CBSSN	W 21–15	18,596
October 22	6:00 p.m.	Middle Tennessee	Pratt & Whitney Stadium at Rentschler Field; East Hartford, CT	CBSSN	L 13–44	10,698
November 13	12:00 p.m.	at Clemson	Memorial Stadium; Clemson, SC	ACCN	L 7–44	77,522
November 20	4:00 p.m.	at UCF	Bounce House; Orlando, FL (Civil Conflict)	ESPN+	L 17–49	37,454
November 27	12:00 p.m.	No. 24 Houston	Pratt & Whitney Stadium at Rentschler Field; East Hartford, CT	CBSSN	L 17–45	12,685
Rankings from CFP Poll released prior to the game; All times are in Eastern time

== Game summaries ==
=== At Fresno State ===
UConn Huskies at Fresno State Bulldogs – Game summary

Quarter	1	2	3	4	Total
Huskies	0	0	0	0	0
Bulldogs	7	24	7	7	45

at Bulldog Stadium • Fresno, California

- Date: August 28
- Game time: 2:05 p.m.
- Game weather: Temperature: 90 °F (32 °C) • Wind: 4 SE • Weather: Smoke
- Game attendance: 26,043
- Referee: T. Salaam
- TV announcers (CBSSN): Rich Waltz (play-by-play), Aaron Taylor (color), and Lindsay Rhodes (sideline)
- Box Score

Game information

First quarter

- FRES – Arron Mosby 31-yard fumble return (Cesar Silva kick), 2:40. Bulldogs 7–0.

Second quarter

- FRES – Ty Jones 9-yard pass from Jake Haener (Cesar Silva kick), 10:47. Bulldogs 14–0. Drive: 4 plays, 69 yards, 1:43.
- FRES – Ronnie Rivers 61-yard pass from Jake Haener (Cesar Silva kick), 3:50. Bulldogs 21–0. Drive: 1 play, 61 yards, 0:10.
- FRES – Jalen Cropper 86-yard pass from Jake Haener (Cesar Silva kick), 1:46. Bulldogs 28–0. Drive: 1 play, 86 yards, 0:14.
- FRES – Cesar Silva 24-yard field goal, 0:00. Bulldogs 31–0. Drive: 9 plays, 71 yards, 1:12.

Third quarter

- FRES – Jordan Mims 8-yard run (Cesar Silva kick), 3:21. Bulldogs 38–0. Drive: 10 plays, 48 yards, 3:44.

Fourth quarter

- FRES – Raymond Pauwels Jr. 1-yard pass from Logan Fife (Cesar Silva kick), 11:30. Bulldogs 45–0. Drive: 10 plays, 57 yards, 3:45.

Top passers

- CONN – Jack Zergiotis – 12/24, 64 yards
- FRES – Jake Haener – 20/26, 331 yards, 3 TD

Top rushers

- CONN – Kevin Mensah – 11 rushes, 31 yards
- FRES – Ronnie Rivers – 13 rushes, 58 yards

Top receivers

- CONN – Cameron Ross – 5 receptions, 37 yards
- FRES – Jalen Cropper – 3 receptions, 87 yards, TD

Statistics	UConn	FRES
First downs	9	25
Total yards	107	538
Rushing yards	35	156
Passing yards	72	382
Turnovers	1	1
Time of possession	29:03	30:57

=== Holy Cross ===
Holy Cross Crusaders at UConn Huskies – Game summary

Quarter	1	2	3	4	Total
Crusaders	7	17	7	7	38
Huskies	14	7	7	0	28

at Pratt & Whitney Stadium at Rentschler Field • East Hartford, Connecticut

- Date: September 4
- Game time: 12:00 p.m.
- Game weather: Temperature: 79 °F (26 °C) • Wind: None • Weather: Sunny
- Game attendance: 18,782
- Referee: Jeff Pruitt
- TV announcers (CBSSN): Ed Cohen (play-by-play), Ross Tucker (color), and Tina Cervasio (sideline)
- Box Score

Game information

First quarter

- HC – Matthew Sluka 6-yard run (Derek Ng kick), 10:36. Crusaders 7–0. Drive: 9 plays, 77 yards, 4:21.
- CONN – Keelan Marion 50-yard pass from Jack Zergiotis (Joe McFadden kick), 4:23. Tied 7–7. Drive: 2 plays, 61 yards, 0:29.
- CONN – Jack Zergiotis 1-yard run (Joe McFadden kick), 2:22. Huskies 14–7. Drive: 3 plays, 2 yards, 1:13.

Second quarter

- HC – Jason Modak 29-yard interception return (Derek Ng kick), 14:44. Tied 14–14.
- HC – Ayir Asante 24-yard pass from Matthew Sluka (Derek Ng kick), 6:54. Crusaders 21–14. Drive: 5 plays, 47 yards, 1:47.
- CONN – Keelan Marion 3-yard pass from Jack Zergiotis (Joe McFadden kick), 2:57. Tied 21–21. Drive: 11 plays, 75 yards, 3:57.
- HC – Derek Ng 30-yard field goal, 0:03. Crusaders 24–21. Drive: 11 plays, 62 yards, 2:54.

Third quarter

- HC – Tyler Purdy 3-yard pass from Matthew Sluka (Derek Ng kick), 6:43. Crusaders 31–21. Drive: 6 plays, 47 yards, 2:39.
- CONN – Jayce Medlock 8-yard pass from Jack Zergiotis (Joe McFadden kick), 3:18. Crusaders 31–28. Drive: 11 plays, 58 yards, 3:25.

Fourth quarter

- HC – Tyler Purdy 14-yard run (Derek Ng kick), 8:19. Crusaders 38–28. Drive: 4 plays, 98 yards, 2:06.

Top passers

- HC – Matthew Sluka – 9/16, 123 yards, 2 TD
- CONN – Jack Zergiotis – 17/41, 174 yards, 3 TD, INT

Top rushers

- HC – Matthew Sluka – 14 rushes, 112 yards, TD
- CONN – Kevin Mensah – 21 rushes, 66 yards

Top receivers

- HC – Jalen Coker – 3 receptions, 47 yards
- CONN – Keelan Marion – 3 receptions, 60 yards, 2 TD

Statistics	HC	UConn
First downs	19	18
Total yards	363	262
Rushing yards	226	88
Passing yards	137	174
Turnovers	1	4
Time of possession	33:13	26:47

=== Purdue ===
Purdue Boilermakers at UConn Huskies – Game summary

Quarter	1	2	3	4	Total
Boilermakers	7	28	14	0	49
Huskies	0	0	0	0	0

at Pratt & Whitney Stadium at Rentschler Field • East Hartford, Connecticut

- Date: September 11
- Game time: 3:00 p.m.
- Game weather: Temperature: 80 °F (27 °C) • Wind: None • Weather: Sunny
- Game attendance: 14,187
- Referee: Stuart Mullins
- TV announcers (CBSSN): Ed Cohen (play-by-play), Randy Cross (color), and Josh Martin (sideline)
- Box Score

Game information

First quarter

- PUR – Payne Durham 17-yard pass from Jack Plummer (Mitchell Fineran kick), 5:06. Boilermakers 7–0. Drive: 5 plays, 56 yards, 2:18.

Second quarter

- PUR – David Bell 30-yard pass from Jack Plummer (Mitchell Fineran kick), 13:21. Boilermakers 14–0. Drive: 9 plays, 83 yards, 2:51.
- PUR – King Doerue 1-yard run (Mitchell Fineran kick), 8:16. Boilermakers 21–0. Drive: 7 plays, 68 yards, 3:34.
- PUR – David Bell 59-yard pass from Jack Plummer (Mitchell Fineran kick), 3:29. Boilermakers 28–0. Drive: 4 plays, 82 yards, 1:51.
- PUR – David Bell 8-yard pass from Jack Plummer (Mitchell Fineran kick), 0:35. Boilermakers 35–0. Drive: 9 plays, 65 yards, 1:43.

Third quarter

- PUR – Mershawn Rice 15-yard pass from Aidan O'Connell (Mitchell Fineran kick), 10:38. Boilermakers 42–0. Drive: 11 plays, 90 yards, 4:15.
- PUR – T.J. Sheffield 5-yard pass from Aidan O'Connell (Mitchell Fineran kick), 4:12. Boilermakers 49–0. Drive: 9 plays, 46 yards, 4:01.

Fourth quarter

- No scoring plays

Top passers

- PUR – Jack Plummer – 16/20, 245 yards, 4 TD
- CONN – Steven Krajewski – 14/25, 99 yards, INT

Top rushers

- PUR – King Doerue – 12 rushes, 74 yards, TD
- CONN – Steven Krajewski – 11 rushes, 42 yards

Top receivers

- PUR – David Bell – 6 receptions, 121 yards, TD
- CONN – Heron Maurisseau – 1 reception, 40 yards

Statistics	PUR	UConn
First downs	29	11
Total yards	562	223
Rushing yards	187	124
Passing yards	375	99
Turnovers	0	1
Time of possession	34:34	25:26

=== At Army ===
UConn Huskies at Army Black Knights – Game summary

Quarter	1	2	3	4	Total
Huskies	0	0	14	7	21
Black Knights	14	28	7	3	52

at Michie Stadium • West Point, NY

- Date: September 18
- Game time: 12:00 p.m.
- Game weather: Temperature: 78 °F (26 °C) • Wind: NW 5 MPH • Weather: Mostly cloudy
- Game attendance: 25,030
- Referee: Jerry Magallena
- TV announcers (CBSSN): Jason Horowitz (play-by-play), Ross Tucker (analyst) & Tina Cervasio (sideline)
- Box score

Game information

First quarter

- ARMY – Christian Anderson 2-yard run (Cole Talley kick), 11:14. Black Knights 7–0. Drive: 4 plays, 64 yards, 1:56.
- ARMY – Isaiah Alston 39-yard pass from Christian Anderson (Cole Talley kick), 5:41. Black Knights 14–0. Drive: 5 plays, 49 yards, 2:31.

Second quarter

- ARMY – Christian Anderson 1-yard run (Cole Talley kick), 14:12. Black Knights 21–0. Drive: 8 plays, 40 yards, 4:27.
- ARMY – Tyrell Robinson 70-yard run (Cole Talley kick), 11:40. Black Knights 28–0. Drive: 2 plays, 82 yards, 0:51.
- ARMY – Jakobi Buchanan 2-yard run (Quinn Maretzki kick), 9:25. Black Knights 35–0. Drive: 3 plays, 33 yards, 1:26.
- ARMY – Anthony Adkins 1-yard run (Quinn Maretzki kick), 0:16. Black Knights 42–0. Drive: 10 plays, 55 yards, 5:49.

Third quarter

- CONN – Tyler Phommachanh 38-yard run (Joe McFadden kick), 10:07. Black Knights 42–7. Drive: 4 plays, 68 yards, 1:20.
- ARMY – Wilson Catoe 2-yard run (Quinn Maretzki kick), 2:30. Black Knights 49–7. Drive: 13 plays, 75 yards, 7:37.
- CONN – Brian Brewton 96-yard kickoff return, 2:12. Black Knights 49–14.

Fourth quarter

- ARMY – Quinn Maretzki 28-yard field goal, 5:55. Black Knights 52–14. Drive: 18 plays, 64 yards, 11:17.
- CONN – Tyler Phommachanh 4-yard run, 1:09. Black Knights 52–21. Drive: 10 plays, 88 yards, 4:46.

Top passers

- CONN – Tyler Phommachanh – 11/26, 109 yards, INT
- ARMY – Christian Anderson – 2/2, 70 yards, TD

Top rushers

- CONN – Tyler Phommachanh – 11 rushes, 60 yards, 2 TD
- ARMY – Tyrell Robinson – 3 rushes, 84 yards, TD

Top receivers

- CONN – Aaron Turner – 2 receptions, 49 yards
- ARMY – Isaiah Alston – 1 reception, 39 yards, TD

Statistics	UConn	ARMY
First downs	9	24
Total yards	225	504
Rushing yards	116	397
Passing yards	109	107
Turnovers	1	0
Time of possession	19:24	40:36

=== Wyoming ===
Wyoming Cowboys at UConn Huskies – Game summary

Quarter	1	2	3	4	Total
Cowboys	0	3	7	14	24
Huskies	10	3	0	9	22

at Pratt & Whitney Stadium at Rentschler Field • East Hartford, Connecticut

- Date: September 25
- Game time: 3:30 p.m.
- Game weather: Temperature: 73 °F (23 °C) • Weather: Sunny
- Game attendance: 12,538
- Referee: Timothy Hedgepeth
- TV announcers (CBSSN): Ed Cohen (play-by-play), Randy Cross (analyst) & Josh Martin (sideline)
- Box score

Game information

First quarter

- UCONN – Joe McFadden 28-yard field goal, 11:39. Huskies 3–0. Drive: 7 plays, 45 yards, 3:15.
- UCONN – Jay Rose 42-yard pass from Tyler Phommachanh (Joe McFadden kick), 1:25. Huskies 10–0. Drive: 6 plays, 74 yards, 1:06.

Second quarter

- UCONN – Joe McFadden 29-yard field goal, 12:54. Huskies 13–0. Drive: 5 plays, 29 yards, 2:47.
- WYO – John Hoyland 24-yard field goal, 4:44. Huskies 13–3. Drive: 16 plays, 72 yards, 8:06.

Third quarter

- WYO – Isaiah Neyor 18-yard pass from Sean Chambers (John Hoyland kick), 10:51. Huskies 13–10. Drive: 9 plays, 69 yards, 4:40.

Fourth quarter

- UCONN – Joe McFadden 35-yard field goal, 11:16. Huskies 16–10. Drive: 16 plays, 74 yards, 6:15.
- WYO – Xazavian Valladay 1-yard run (John Hoyland kick), 6:31. Cowboys 17–16. Drive: 10 plays, 77 yards, 4:39.
- WYO – Titus Swen 2-yard run (John Hoyland kick), 3:34. Cowboys 24–16. Drive: 5 plays, 29 yards, 2:43.
- UCONN – Nate Carter 2-yard run (pass failed), 0:04. Cowboys 24–22. Drive: 14 plays, 64 yards, 3:24.

Top passers

- WYO – Sean Chambers – 15/26, 149 yards, TD, 2 INT
- UCONN – Tyler Phommachanh – 19/40, 171 yards, TD, INT

Top rushers

- WYO – Xazavian Valladay – 22 rushes, 101 yards, TD
- UCONN – Nate Carter – 10 rushes, 65 yards, TD

Top receivers

- WYO – Ayden Eberhardt – 3 receptions, 40 yards
- UCONN – Aaron Turner – 6 receptions, 49 yards

Statistics	WYO	UConn
First downs	22	19
Total yards	353	281
Rushing yards	204	110
Passing yards	149	171
Turnovers	2	1
Time of possession	35:29	24:31

=== At Vanderbilt ===
UConn Huskies at Vanderbilt Commodores – Game summary

Quarter	1	2	3	4	Total
Huskies	6	10	0	12	28
Commodores	3	14	0	13	30

at Vanderbilt Stadium • Nashville, Tennessee

- Date: October 2
- Game time: 7:30 p.m.
- Game weather: Sunny
- Game attendance: 21,218
- Referee: James Carter
- TV announcers (ESPNU): Brian Custer (play-by-play) & Kelly Stouffer (analyst)
- Box score

Game information

First quarter

- CONN – Joe McFadden 38-yard field goal, 10:51. Huskies 3–0. Drive: 10 plays, 50 yards, 4:03.
- CONN – Joe McFadden 44-yard field goal, 7:28. Huskies 6–0. Drive: 9 plays, 30 yards, 2:22.
- VAN – Joseph Bulovas 39-yard field goal, 3:12. Huskies 6–3. Drive: 9 plays, 54 yards, 4:16.

Second quarter

- VAN – Will Sheppard 26-yard pass from Ken Seals (Joseph Bulovas kick), 14:12. Commodores 10–6. Drive: 6 plays, 80 yards, 2:36.
- CONN – Joe McFadden 31-yard field goal, 10:28. Commodores 10–9. Drive: 8 plays, 44 yards, 2:37.
- VAN – Rocko Griffin 1-yard run (Joseph Bulovas kick), 4:00. Commodores 17–9. Drive: 13 plays, 77 yards, 6:21.
- CONN – Keelan Marion 40-yard pass from Steven Krajewski (Joe McFadden kick), 1:34. Commodores 17–16. Drive: 9 plays, 87 yards, 2:18.

Third quarter

- No scoring plays

Fourth quarter

- VAN – Joseph Bulovas 27-yard field goal, 11:16. Commodores 20–16. Drive: 4 plays, 76 yards, 6:03.
- VAN – Will Sheppard 38-yard pass from Ken Seals (Joseph Bulovas kick), 8:19. Commodores 27–16. Drive: 4 plays, 67 yards, 1:24.
- CONN – Kevens Clercius 8-yard pass from Steven Krajewski (pass failed), 5:21. Commodores 27–22. Drive: 9 plays, 79 yards, 2:53.
- CONN – Steven Krajewski 17-yard run (pass failed), 1:07. Huskies 28–27. Drive: 8 plays, 78 yards, 1:54.
- VAN – Joseph Bulovas 31-yard field goal, 0:00. Commodores 30–28. Drive: 7 plays, 47 yards, 1:07.

Top passers

- CONN – Steven Krajewski – 18/34, 264 yards, 2 TD, 2 INT
- VAN – Ken Seals – 27/40, 333 yards, 2 TD, INT

Top rushers

- CONN – Nate Carter – 24 rushes, 123 yards
- VAN – Rocko Griffin – 19 rushes, 77 yards, TD

Top receivers

- CONN – Keelan Marion – 4 receptions, 102 yards, TD
- VAN – Will Sheppard – 8 receptions, 119 yards, 2 TD

Statistics	UConn	VAN
First downs	26	23
Total yards	515	439
Rushing yards	184	106
Passing yards	331	333
Turnovers	2	2
Time of possession	28:10	31:50

=== At UMass ===
UConn Huskies at UMass Minutemen – Game summary

Quarter	1	2	3	4	Total
Huskies	10	0	0	3	13
Minutemen	7	0	3	17	27

at Warren McGuirk Alumni Stadium • Hadley, Massachusetts

- Date: October 9
- Game time: 3:30 p.m.
- Game weather: Temperature: 64 °F (18 °C) • Weather: Overcast • Wind: E 8 MPH
- Game attendance: 12,765
- Referee: Hank Johns
- TV announcers (NESN): Jay Burnham (play-by-play), Andy Gresh (analyst) and Matt Goldstein (sideline)
- Box score

Game information

First quarter

- MASS – Ellis Merriweather 9-yard run (Cameron Carson kick), 8:11. Minutemen 7–0. Drive: 12 plays, 73 yards, 5:32.
- CONN – Keelan Marion 34-yard pass from Steven Krajewski (Joe McFadden kick), 7:15. Tied 7–7. Drive: 3 plays, 74 yards, 0:56.
- CONN – Joe McFadden 38-yard field goal, 1:56. Huskies 10–7. Drive: 9 plays, 50 yards, 3:02.

Second quarter

- No scoring plays

Third quarter

- MASS – Cameron Carson 21-yard field goal, 9:27. Tied 10–10. Drive: 10 plays, 72 yards, 5:33.

Fourth quarter

- MASS – Cameron Carson 28-yard field goal, 14:56. Minutemen 13–10. Drive: 6 plays, 55 yards, 2:07.
- MASS – Ellis Merriweather 1-yard run (Cameron Carson kick), 12:46. Minutemen 20–10. Drive: 3 plays, 6 yards, 1:26.
- CONN – Joe McFadden 20-yard field goal, 10:07. Minutemen 20–13. Drive: 9 plays, 75 yards, 2:39.
- MASS – Zamar Wise 1-yard run (Cameron Carson kick), 4:54. Minutemen 27–13. Drive: 8 plays, 78 yards, 5:13.

Top passers

- CONN – Steven Krajewski – 13/24, 128 yards, TD, 2 INT
- MASS – Brady Olson – 10/22, 166 yards

Top rushers

- CONN – Nate Carter – 20 rushes, 136 yards
- MASS – Ellis Merriweather – 39 rushes, 171 yards, 2 TD

Top receivers

- CONN – Keelan Marion – 4 receptions, 80 yards, TD
- MASS – Eric Collins – 3 receptions, 66 yards

Statistics	UConn	UMass
First downs	14	21
Total yards	291	407
Rushing yards	163	247
Passing yards	128	160
Turnovers	3	0
Time of possession	20:49	39:11

The day before the game, interim head coach Lou Spanos, offensive coordinator/offensive line coach Frank Giufre, and tight ends coach Corey Edsall, along with offensive linemen Ryan Van Demark and Will Meyer, tested positive for COVID-19. Defensive line coach Dennis Dottin-Carter served as the Huskies' head coach for the game.

=== Yale ===
Yale Bulldogs at UConn Huskies – Game summary

Quarter	1	2	3	4	Total
Bulldogs	0	0	9	6	15
Huskies	0	14	7	0	21

at Pratt & Whitney Stadium at Rentschler Field • East Hartford, Connecticut

- Date: October 16
- Game time: 12:00 p.m.
- Game weather: 75 degrees Sunny
- Game attendance: 18,596
- Referee: Hans Wittelsberger
- TV announcers (CBSSN): Jason Knapp (play-by-play) & Ross Tucker (color)
- Box score

Game information

First quarter

- No scoring plays

Second quarter

- CONN – Keelan Marion 63-yard pass from Steven Krajewski (Joe McFadden kick), 5:22. Huskies 7–0. Drive: 4 plays, 73 yards, 1:17.'
- CONN – Kevens Clercius 14-yard pass from Steven Krajewski (Joe McFadden kick), 0:20. Huskies 14–0. Drive: 3 plays, 51 yards, 0:50.

Third quarter

- CONN – Steven Krajewski 20-yard run (Joe McFadden kick), 11:15. Huskies 21–0. Drive: 6 plays, 63 yards, 2:39.
- YALE – Jack Bosman 45-yard field goal, 8:40. Huskies 21–3. Drive: 7 plays, 22 yards, 2:35.
- YALE – Zane Dudek 3-yard run (kick failed), 0:48. Huskies 21–9. Drive: 9 plays, 65 yards, 3:38.

Fourth quarter

- YALE – Chase Nenad 60-yard pass from Nolan Grooms (kick failed), 4:30. Huskies 21–15. Drive: 3 plays, 62 yards, 0:52.

Top passers

- YALE – Nolan Grooms – 8/31, 132 yards, TD, INT
- CONN – Steven Krajewski – 21/32, 199 yards, 2 TD

Top rushers

- YALE – Nolan Grooms – 12 rushes, 67 yards
- CONN – Kevin Mensah – 12 rushes, 58 yards

Top receivers

- YALE – Chase Nenand – 1 reception, 60 yards, TD
- CONN – Keelan Marion – 2 receptions, 64 yards, TD

Statistics	YALE	UConn
First downs	16	15
Total yards	299	318
Rushing yards	108	119
Passing yards	191	199
Turnovers	4	0
Time of possession	31:35	28:25

=== Middle Tennessee ===
Middle Tennessee Blue Raiders at UConn Huskies – Game summary

Quarter	1	2	3	4	Total
Blue Raiders	3	21	10	10	44
Huskies	0	13	0	0	13

at Pratt & Whitney Stadium at Rentschler Field • East Hartford, Connecticut

- Date: October 22
- Game time: 6:02 p.m.
- Game weather: Sunny
- Game attendance: 10,698
- Referee: Mike Roche
- TV announcers (CBSSN): John Sadak (play-by-play) & Randy Cross (color analyst)
- Box score

Game information

First quarter

- MTS – Zeke Rankin 20-yard field goal, 2:46. Blue Raiders 3–0. Drive: 9 plays, 30 yards, TOP 04:06.

Second quarter

- MTS – Jimmy Marshall 14-yard pass from Chase Cunningham (Zeke Rankin kick), 14:56. Blue Raiders 10–0. Drive: 4 plays, 51 yards, TOP 01:01.
- CONN – Brandon Niemenski 8-yard pass from Steven Krajewski (Joe McFadden kick), 10:43. Blue Raiders 10–7. Drive: 12 plays, 85 yards, TOP 04:12.
- CONN – Joe McFadden 47-yard field goal, 6:18. Tied 10–10. Drive: 7 plays, 47 yards, TOP 01:59.
- MTS – Izaiah Gathings 25-yard pass from Chase Cunningham (Zeke Rankin kick), 4:02. Blue Raiders 17–10. Drive: 7 plays, 75 yards, TOP 02:16.
- MTS – Jimmy Marshall 18-yard pass from Chase Cunningham (Zeke Rankin kick), 1:15. Blue Raiders 24–10. Drive: 6 plays, 64 yards, TOP 01:50.
- CONN – Joe McFadden 21-yard field goal, 0:00. Blue Raiders 24–13. Drive: 7 plays, 77 yards, TOP 01:11.

Third quarter

- MTS – Zeke Rankin 32-yard field goal, 7:32. Blue Raiders 27–13. Drive: 16 plays, 58 yards, TOP 07:24.
- MTS – Martell Pettaway 1-yard run (Zeke Rankin kick), 3:02. Blue Raiders 34–13. Drive: 12 plays, 71 yards, TOP 03:09.

Fourth quarter

- MTS – Jarrin Pierce 24-yard pass from Chase Cunningham (Zeke Rankin kick), 12:31. Blue Raiders 41–13. Drive: 8 plays, 56 yards, TOP 03:49.
- MTS – Zeke Rankin 22-yard field goal, 7:16. Blue Raiders 44–13. Drive: 8 plays, 21 yards, TOP 04:36.

Top passers

- MTS – Chase Cunningham – 25/36, 297 yards, 4 TDs
- CONN – Steven Krajewski – 21/37, 237 yards, 1 TD, 2 INTs

Top rushers

- MTS – Martell Pettaway – 12 rushes, 63 yards, 1 TD
- CONN – Nate Carter – 8 rushes, 30 yards

Top receivers

- MTS – Yusuf Ali – 5 receptions, 80 yards
- CONN – Keelan Marion – 4 receptions, 74 yards

Statistics	Middle Tennessee	UConn
First downs	30	16
Total yards	473	304
Rushing yards	155	67
Passing yards	318	237
Turnovers	0	3
Time of possession	37:22	22:38

=== At Clemson ===
UConn Huskies at Clemson Tigers – Game summary

Quarter	1	2	3	4	Total
Huskies	7	0	0	0	7
Tigers	10	20	7	7	44

at Memorial Stadium • Clemson, South Carolina

- Date: November 13
- Game time: 12:03 p.m.
- Game weather: Temperature: 59 °F (15 °C) • Weather: Sunny • Wind: W 9 MPH
- Game attendance: 77,522
- Referee: Riley Johnson
- TV announcers (ACCN): Wes Durham (play-by-play), Roddy Jones (color analyst), and Taylor Davis (sideline)
- Box Score

Game information

First quarter

- CONN – Brian Brewton 99-yard kickoff return (Joe McFadden kick), 14:45. Huskies 7–0. Drive: 0 plays, 99 yards, TOP 00:00.
- CLEM – BT Potter 49-yard field goal, 9:13. Huskies 7–3. Drive: 15 plays, 34 yards, TOP 05:34.
- CLEM – Will Swinney 6-yard run (BT Potter kick), 3:03. Tigers 10–7. Drive: 11 plays, 78 yards, TOP 03:46.

Second quarter

- CLEM – Taisun Phommachanh 3-yard run (BT Potter kick), 14:31. Tigers 17–7. Drive: 6 plays, 66 yards, TOP 01:51.
- CLEM – BT Potter 49-yard field goal, 8:01. Tigers 20–7. Drive: 8 plays, 36 yards, TOP 03:05.
- CLEM – BT Potter 30-yard field goal, 6:30. Tigers 23–7. Drive: 4 plays, 5 yards, TOP 00:53.
- CLEM – Beaux Collins 32-yard pass from DJ Uiagalelei (BT Potter kick), 00:15. Tigers 30–7. Drive: 6 plays, 88 yards, TOP 00:34.

Third quarter

- CLEM – Phil Mafah 2-yard run (BT Potter kick), 10:20. Tigers 37–7. Drive: 11 plays, 46 yards, TOP 04:39.

Fourth quarter

- CLEM – Jake Briningstool 25-yard pass from Billy Wiles (Jonathan Weitz kick), 03:36. Tigers 44–7. Drive: 2 plays, 30 yards, TOP 00:40.

Top passers

- CONN – Jack Zergiotis – 9/21, 90 yards, 2 INT
- CLEM – DJ Uiagalelei – 21/44, 241 yards, 1 TD, 1 INT

Top rushers

- CONN – Nate Carter – 5 rushes, 19 yards
- Clem – Phil Mafah – 17 rushes, 49 yards, 1 TD

Top receivers

- CONN – Aaron Turner – 5 receptions, 59 yards
- Clem – Dacari Collins – 6 receptions, 97 yards

Statistics	UConn	Clemson
First downs	6	26
Total yards	99	476
Rushing yards	-17	129
Passing yards	116	347
Turnovers	2	2
Time of possession	23:16	36:44

=== At UCF ===
UConn Huskies at UCF Knights – Game summary

Quarter	1	2	3	4	Total
Huskies	0	14	0	3	17
Knights	21	14	0	14	49

at Bounce House • Orlando, Florida

- Date: November 20
- Game time: 4:05 p.m.
- Game weather: Temperature: 73 °F (23 °C) • Weather: Cloudy • Wind: SW 14 MPH
- Game attendance: 37,454
- Referee: Tim Rich
- TV announcers (ESPN+): Conner Onion (play-by-play) & Leger Douzable (color analyst)
- Box Score

Game information

First quarter

- UCF – Johnny Richardson 9-yard run (Daniel Obarski kick), 10:58. Knights 7–0. Drive: 7 plays, 45 yards, TOP 02:50.
- UCF – Mikey Keene 30-yard run (Daniel Obarski kick), 9:37. Knights 14–0. Drive: 3 plays, 47 yards, TOP 01:04.
- UCF – Mark-Antony Richards 8-yard run (Daniel Obarski kick), 5:50. Knights 21–0. Drive: 6 plays, 55 yards, TOP 02:31.

Second quarter

- UCF – Johnny Richardson 17-yard pass from Mikey Keene (Daniel Obarski kick), 13:15. Knights 28–0. Drive: 11 plays, 98 yards, TOP 02:55.
- CONN – Nate Carter 1-yard run (Joe McFadden kick), 9:56. Knights 28–7. Drive: 8 plays, 74 yards, TOP 03:13.
- UCF – Brandon Johnson 49-yard pass from Ryan O'Keefe (Daniel Obarski kick), 7:36. Knights 35–7. Drive: 1 plays, 49 yards, TOP 00:09.
- CONN – Steven Krajewski 1-yard run (Joe McFadden kick), 4:40. Knights 35–14. Drive: 8 plays, 69 yards, TOP 02:49.

Third quarter No Scoring Plays Fourth quarter

- UCF – Parker Navarro 5-yard run (Daniel Obarski kick), 14:54. Knights 42–14. Drive: 6 plays, 59 yards, TOP 01:44.
- UCF – Amari Johnson 3-yard pass from Mikey Keene (Daniel Obarski kick), 10:43. Knights 49–14. Drive: 7 plays, 50 yards, TOP 03:10.
- CONN – Joe McFadden 42-yard field goal, 7:30. Knights 49–17. Drive: 8 plays, 44 yards, TOP 03:13.

Top passers

- CONN – Steven Krajewski – 18/42, 174 yards, 3 INTs
- UCF – Mikey Keene – 23/29, 208 yards, 2 TDs

Top rushers

- CONN – Nate Carter – 13 rushes, 77 yards, 1 TD
- UCF – Johnny Richardson – 14 rushes, 147 yards, 1 TD

Top receivers

- CONN – Jay Rose – 10 receptions, 89 yards
- UCF – Brandon Johnson – 7 receptions, 125 yards, 1 TD

Statistics	UConn	UCF
First downs	17	23
Total yards	311	537
Rushing yards	137	280
Passing yards	174	257
Turnovers	3	1
Time of possession	32:30	27:30

=== No. 24 Houston ===
Houston Cougars at UConn Huskies – Game summary

Quarter	1	2	3	4	Total
Cougars	7	14	17	7	45
Huskies	0	10	0	7	17

at Pratt & Whitney Stadium at Rentschler Field • East Hartford, Connecticut

- Date: November 27
- Game time: 12:08 p.m.
- Game weather: 39 degrees Sunny
- Game attendance: 12,685
- Referee: Tom Omara
- TV announcers (CBSSN): Jason Knapp (play-by-play), Ross Tucker (color analyst), and Tina Cervasio (sideline)
- Box score

Game information

First quarter

- HOU – Alton McCaskill 31-yard run (Dalton Witherspoon kick), 10:21. Cougars 7–0. Drive: 6 plays, 55 yards, TOP 03:02.

Second quarter

- HOU – Jake Herslow 49-yard pass from Clayton Tune (Dalton Witherspoon kick), 11:44. Cougars 14–0. Drive: 3 plays, 52 yards, TOP 00:50.
- CONN – Kevens Clercius 34-yard pass from Steven Krajewski (Joe McFadden kick), 6:31. Cougars 14–7. Drive: 3 plays, 25 yards, TOP 01:09.
- HOU – Nathaniel Dell 6-yard pass from Clayton Tune (Dalton Witherspoon kick), 1:15. Cougars 21–7. Drive: 9 plays, 58 yards, TOP 05:09.
- CONN – Joe McFadden 25-yard field goal, 0:01. Cougars 21–10. Drive: 7 plays, 52 yards, TOP 01:11.

Third quarter

- HOU – Nathaniel Dell 13-yard pass from Clayton Tune (Dalton Witherspoon kick), 11:08. Cougars 28–10. Drive: 9 plays, 47 yards, TOP 03:45.
- HOU – Dalton Witherspoon 23-yard field goal, 6:02. Cougars 31–10. Drive: 7 plays, 61 yards, TOP 03:36.
- HOU – Jeremy Singleton 34-yard pass from Clayton Tune (Dalton Witherspoon kick), 1:26. Cougars 38–10. Drive: 3 plays, 55 yards, TOP 01:18.

Fourth quarter

- CONN – Malik Dixon 37-yard interception return (Joe McFadden kick), 11:30. Cougars 38–17.
- HOU – Chandler Smith 1-yard run (Dalton Witherspoon kick), 3:03. Cougars 45–17. Drive: 4 plays, 27 yards, TOP 01:50.

Top passers

- HOU – Clayton Tune – 21/30, 301 yards, 4 TDs
- CONN – Steven Krajewski – 9/19, 79 yards, 1 TD

Top rushers

- HOU – Alton McCaskill – 9 rushes, 54 yards, 1 TD
- CONN – Steven Krajewski – 8 rushes, 53 yards

Top receivers

- HOU – Jake Herslow – 5 receptions, 111 yards, 1 TD
- CONN – Kevens Clercius – 2 receptions, 64 yards, 1 TD

Statistics	Houston	UConn
First downs	21	16
Total yards	472	238
Rushing yards	149	82
Passing yards	323	156
Turnovers	1	1
Time of possession	31:16	28:44

== Roster ==
2021 UConn Huskies football team roster
Players
Coaches
Offense

Pos.	#	Name	Class
WR	1	Keelan Marion	Fr
WR	3	Heron Maurisseau	So
WR	4	Matt Drayton	So
WR	5	Aaron Turner	Fr
WR	7	Cameron Ross	So
QB	8	Steven Krajewski	So
WR	9	Darius Bush	Fr
QB	10	Micah Leon	Jr
QB	11	Jack Zergiotis	So
QB	12	Tyler Phommachanh	Fr
QB	13	Miles Foerster	Fr
WR	14	Elijah Jeffreys	So
WR	15	Mark Didio	Fr
RB	25	Devontae Houston	Fr
RB	26	Nate Carter	Fr
RB	28	Brian Brewton	Fr
RB	30	Robert Burns	GS
RB	34	Kevin Mensah	Sr
RB	36	Khyon Gillespie	So
WR	39	Hayden Jordon	Fr
WR	42	Kevin Dunn	Fr
RB	44	Max Modeste	Fr
TE	45	Christopher Johnson	Fr
OL	50	Dylan Niedrowski	So
OL	51	Peter Rooney Jr.	So
OL	52	Yakiri Walker	Fr
OL	53	Sidney Walker	Jr
OL	60	Mason Raymer	Fr
OL	61	Jesse Polansky	Fr
OL	62	Noel Ofori-Nyadu	So
OL	64	Christian Haynes	So
OL	67	Christopher Fortin	Fr
OL	69	Will Meyer	Fr
OL	70	Femi Sakiri	Fr
OL	71	Valentin Senn	Fr
OL	72	Rayonte Brown	Fr
OL	74	Ryan Van Demark	Sr
OL	75	Chase Lundt	Fr
OL	76	Jonathan Pace	Jr
OL	77	Robby Rochester	Fr
OL	79	Danny Antolovich	Fr
TE	80	Jayce Medlock	So
TE	81	Jay Rose	Sr
TE	82	Brendan Heatherman	Fr
TE	83	Brandon Niemenski	Fr
WR	84	Jacob Flynn	Fr
TE	85	Russell Dixon	Fr
WR	86	Kevens Clercius	Fr
WR	87	Cameron Hairston	Jr
WR	88	Josh Tracey	Fr
WR	89	Jahkai Gill	So

Defense

Pos.	#	Name	Class
DB	0	Reyan Blake	Fr
DB	2	Myles Bell	So
DB	3	Diamond Harrell	Sr
LB	5	Terrence Ganyi	So
LB	6	Ian Swenson	Jr
DB	7	Tre Wortham	Jr
DB	8	Jalon Ferrell	So
DL	9	Langston Hardy	Fr
DB	12	Kaleb Anthony	Fr
DB	14	Malcolm Bell	Fr
LB	15	Tui Faumuina-Brown	Fr
DB	16	Malik Banks	So
DB	17	Stan Cross	Fr
DB	18	Jaylen Jones	Fr
DB	19	Durante Jones	Fr
DB	20	Deon Mclean Jr.	Fr
DB	21	Jeremy Lucien	Jr
DB	22	Alfred Chea	Fr
DB	23	Juan Rosario	So
LB	24	Desmond Fogle	Fr
LB	27	Omar Fortt	Sr
LB	29	Jordan Morrison	So
DB	31	Malik Dixon	Fr
DB	32	Shamel Lazarus	So
LB	33	Hunter Webb	So
DB	37	Kyle Williams	GS
DB	38	Winston Jules	Fr
LB	40	Deondrick Speight	Fr
LB	41	D.J. Morgan	GS
LB	43	Jackson Mitchell	So
LB	46	John Bechtle	Fr
LB	47	Justin Bryant	So
DL	48	Kevon Jones	Jr
DL	55	MarQuayveon Evans	Fr
DL	56	Carter Hooper	Fr
DL	57	Travis Jones	Jr
LB	58	Dillon Harris	Sr
DL	65	Aaron Lange	Fr
DL	68	Justin Moore	Fr
DL	90	Pryce Yates	Fr
DL	91	Collin McCarthy	Fr
DL	93	Pierce DeVaughn	So
DL	94	Nick Harris	Fr
DL	95	Eric Watts	So
DL	96	Dal'mont Gourdine	Fr
DL	98	Lwal Uguak	Jr

Special teams

Pos.	#	Name	Class
P	17	Blake Otto	Fr
LS	53	Brian Keating	Sr
LS	59	Nilay Upadhyayula	Fr
LS	63	Kevin Cahill	So
K	84	Joe McFadden	Fr
K	92	Noah Iden	So
K	97	Noe Ruelas	Fr
P	99	Haydn Kerr	Fr

Head coach

- Randy Edsall (games 1)
- Lou Spanos (games 3–12)

Coordinators/assistant coaches

- Frank Giufre
  Offensive coordinator/offensive line
- Jarren Horton
  Defensive coordinator/star, nickel, dime
- Eddie Allen
  Special teams coordinator
- Kyle Weiss
  Running backs
- Corey Edsall
  Tight ends
- Darrell Perkins
  Defensive backs
- Dennis Dottin-Carter
  Defensive line
- Aaron Smith
  Wide receivers
- Mike Moyseenko
  Quarterbacks
- Jim L. Mora
  Offensive assistant

Legend

- (C) Team captain
- (S) Suspended
- (I) Ineligible
- Injured
- Redshirt

Roster
Last update: June 7, 2021

== NFL draft ==
One Husky was selected in the 2021 NFL draft following the season.

Round	Pick	Player	Position	NFL team
3	76	Travis Jones	Defensive tackle	Baltimore Ravens
