= 2021 Yale Bulldogs football team =

American college football season

2021 Yale Bulldogs football
- Conference: Ivy League
- Record: 5–5 (4–3 Ivy)
- Head coach: Tony Reno (9th season)
- Offensive coordinator: Kevin Cahill (3rd season)
- Offensive scheme: Pro spread
- Defensive coordinator: Sean McGowan (4th season)
- Base defense: 4–2–5
- Home stadium: Yale Bowl

2021 Ivy League football standings
| | Conf. | | | Overall |
| Team | W | | L | W | | L |
|---|---|---|---|---|---|---|
| No. 20 Dartmouth + | 6 | – | 1 | 9 | – | 1 |
| No. 24 Princeton + | 6 | – | 1 | 9 | – | 1 |
| Harvard | 5 | – | 2 | 8 | – | 2 |
| Yale | 4 | – | 3 | 5 | – | 5 |
| Columbia | 4 | – | 3 | 7 | – | 3 |
| Penn | 1 | – | 6 | 3 | – | 7 |
| Brown | 1 | – | 6 | 2 | – | 8 |
| Cornell | 1 | – | 6 | 2 | – | 8 |
+ – Conference co-champions; Rankings from STATS Poll

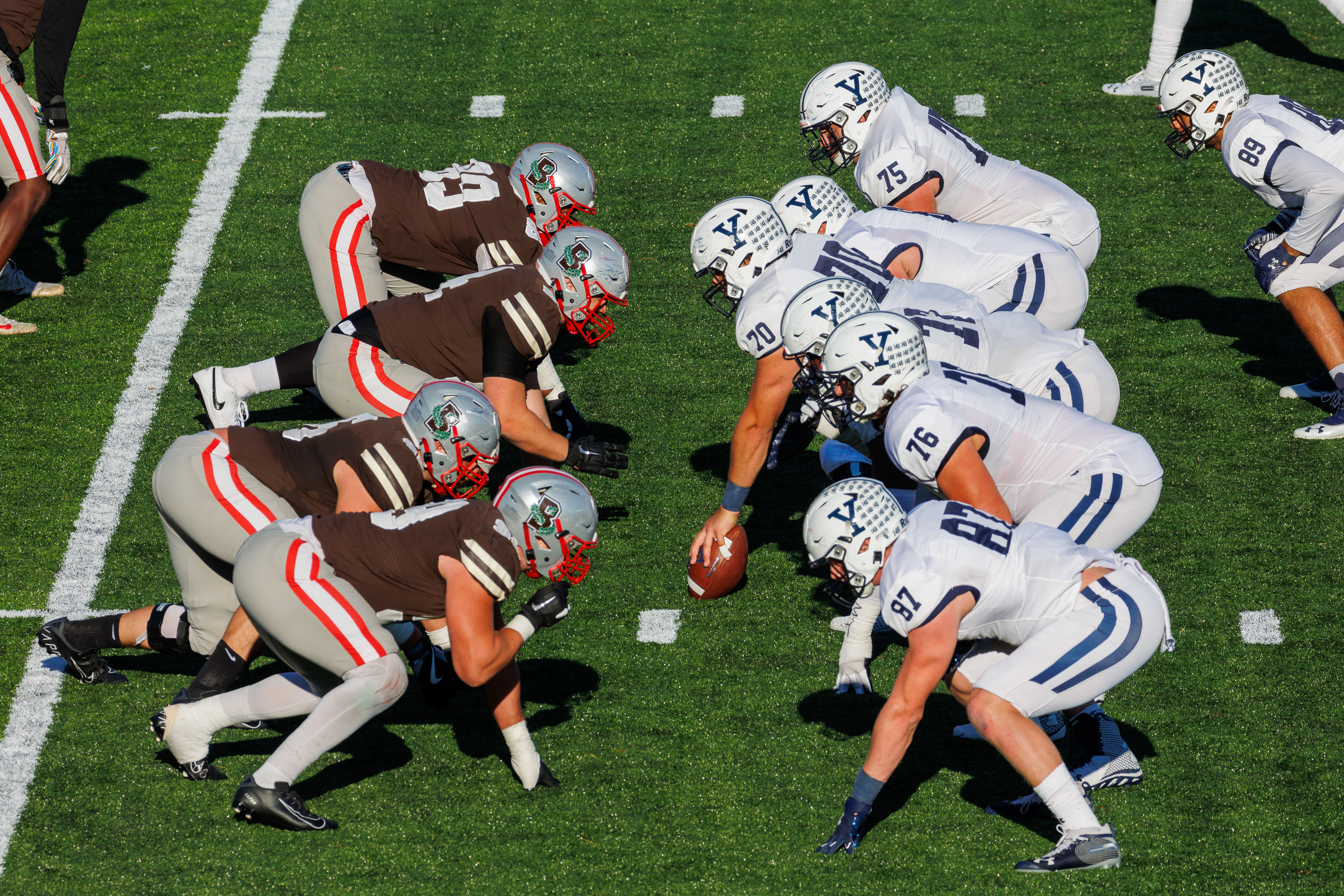
The Bulldogs defeated the Brown Bears, 63-38

The 2021 Yale Bulldogs football team represented Yale University in the 2021 NCAA Division I FCS football season as a member of the Ivy League. The team was led by ninth-year head coach Tony Reno and played its home games at the Yale Bowl. Yale's 63-point win against Brown on November 6 was the Bulldogs' most single-game points under coach Reno. Yale averaged 13,263 fans per game.

== Schedule ==
| Date | Time | Opponent | Site | TV | Result | Attendance |
|---|---|---|---|---|---|---|
| September 18 | 12:00 p.m. | Holy Cross* | Yale Bowl; New Haven, CT | | L 17–20 | 3,987 |
| September 25 | 12:00 p.m. | Cornell | Yale Bowl; New Haven, CT | | W 23–17 | 4,916 |
| October 2 | 12:00 p.m. | at Lehigh* | Goodman Stadium; Bethlehem, PA | | W 34–0 | 3,528 |
| October 9 | 1:30 p.m. | at Dartmouth | Memorial Field; Hanover, NH | ESPN+ | L 17–24 ^{OT} | 10,079 |
| October 16 | 12:00 p.m. | at UConn* | Pratt & Whitney Stadium at Rentschler Field; East Hartford, CT | CBSSN | L 15–21 | 18,596 |
| October 23 | 12:00 p.m. | Penn | Yale Bowl; New Haven, CT | ESPN+ | W 42–28 | 4,475 |
| October 30 | 12:00 p.m. | Columbia | Yale Bowl; New Haven, CT | ESPN+ | W 37–30 | 3,437 |
| November 6 | 12:30 p.m. | at Brown | Richard Gouse Field at Brown Stadium; Providence, RI | ESPN+ | W 63-38 | 4,084 |
| November 13 | 1:00 p.m. | at Princeton | Powers Field at Princeton Stadium; Princeton, NJ (rivalry) | ESPN+ | L 20-35 | 7,686 |
| November 20 | 12:00 p.m. | Harvard | Yale Bowl; New Haven, CT (rivalry) | ESPNU | L 31-34 | 49,500 |
*Non-conference game; All times are in Eastern time

== Game summaries ==
=== at UConn ===
Yale Bulldogs at UConn Huskies – Game summary

| Quarter | 1 | 2 | 3 | 4 | Total |
|---|---|---|---|---|---|
| Bulldogs | 0 | 0 | 9 | 6 | 15 |
| Huskies | 0 | 14 | 7 | 0 | 21 |

at Pratt & Whitney Stadium at Rentschler Field • East Hartford, Connecticut

- Date: October 16
- Game time: 12:00 p.m.
- Game weather: 75 degrees Sunny
- Game attendance: 18,596
- Referee: Hans Wittelsberger
- TV announcers (CBSSN): Jason Knapp (play-by-play) & Ross Tucker (color)
- Box score

Game information

First quarter

- No scoring plays

Second quarter

- CONN – Keelan Marion 63-yard pass from Steven Krajewski (Joe McFadden kick), 5:22. Huskies 7–0. Drive: 4 plays, 73 yards, 1:17.'
- CONN – Kevens Clercius 14-yard pass from Steven Krajewski (Joe McFadden kick), 0:20. Huskies 14–0. Drive: 3 plays, 51 yards, 0:50.

Third quarter

- CONN – Steven Krajewski 20-yard run (Joe McFadden kick), 11:15. Huskies 21–0. Drive: 6 plays, 63 yards, 2:39.
- YALE – Jack Bosman 45-yard field goal, 8:40. Huskies 21–3. Drive: 7 plays, 22 yards, 2:35.
- YALE – Zane Dudek 3-yard run (kick failed), 0:48. Huskies 21–9. Drive: 9 plays, 65 yards, 3:38.

Fourth quarter

- YALE – Chase Nenad 60-yard pass from Nolan Grooms (kick failed), 4:30. Huskies 21–15. Drive: 3 plays, 62 yards, 0:52.

Top passers

- YALE – Nolan Grooms – 8/31, 132 yards, TD, INT
- CONN – Steven Krajewski – 21/32, 199 yards, 2 TD

Top rushers

- YALE – Nolan Grooms – 12 rushes, 67 yards
- CONN – Kevin Mensah – 12 rushes, 58 yards

Top receivers

- YALE – Chase Nenand – 1 reception, 60 yards, TD
- CONN – Keelan Marion – 2 receptions, 64 yards, TD

| Statistics | YALE | UConn |
|---|---|---|
| First downs | 16 | 15 |
| Total yards | 299 | 318 |
| Rushing yards | 108 | 119 |
| Passing yards | 191 | 199 |
| Turnovers | 4 | 0 |
| Time of possession | 31:35 | 28:25 |

== NFL draft ==
The following Bulldog was selected in the National Football League draft following the season.

| Round | Pick | Player | Position | NFL team |
|---|---|---|---|---|
| 7 | 239 | Rodney Thomas II | LB | Indianapolis Colts |
