= 2021 Holy Cross Crusaders football team =

American college football season

2021 Holy Cross Crusaders football

Patriot League champion

NCAA Division I Second Round, L 16–21 vs. Villanova
- Conference: Patriot League

Ranking
- STATS: No. 19
- FCS Coaches: No. 22
- Record: 10–3 (6–0 Patriot)
- Head coach: Bob Chesney (4th season)
- Offensive coordinator: Justin Roper (2nd season)
- Offensive scheme: Multiple
- Defensive coordinator: Scott James (4th season)
- Base defense: 4–3
- Home stadium: Fitton Field

2021 Patriot League football standings
| | Conf. | | | Overall |
| Team | W | | L | W | | L |
|---|---|---|---|---|---|---|
| No. 19 Holy Cross $^ | 6 | – | 0 | 10 | – | 3 |
| Colgate | 5 | – | 1 | 5 | – | 6 |
| Fordham | 4 | – | 2 | 6 | – | 5 |
| Lehigh | 3 | – | 3 | 3 | – | 8 |
| Lafayette | 2 | – | 4 | 3 | – | 8 |
| Georgetown | 1 | – | 5 | 2 | – | 8 |
| Bucknell | 0 | – | 6 | 1 | – | 10 |
$ – Conference champion; ^ – FCS playoff participant; Rankings from STATS Poll

The 2021 Holy Cross Crusaders football team represented the College of the Holy Cross as a member of the Patriot League during the 2021 NCAA Division I FCS football season. Led by fourth-year head coach Bob Chesney, Holy Cross compiled an overall record of 10–3 with a mark of 6–0 in conference play, winning the Patriot League title. The Crusaders advanced to the NCAA Division I Football Championship playoffs, where they beat Sacred Heart in the first round before losing to Villanova in the second round. They played their home games at Fitton Field in Worcester, Massachusetts.

== Schedule ==
| Date | Time | Opponent | Rank | Site | TV | Result | Attendance |
|---|---|---|---|---|---|---|---|
| September 4 | 12:00 p.m. | at UConn* | | Rentschler Field; East Hartford, CT | CBSSN | W 38–28 | 18,782 |
| September 11 | 2:00 p.m. | Merrimack* | No. 24 | Fitton Field; Worcester, MA | ESPN+ | L 21–35 | 8,211 |
| September 18 | 12:00 p.m. | at Yale* | | Yale Bowl; New Haven, CT | ESPN+ | W 20–17 | 3,987 |
| September 25 | 1:00 p.m. | at No. 20 Monmouth* | | Kessler Stadium; West Long Branch, NJ | ESPN+ | W 45–15 | 4,235 |
| October 2 | 1:30 p.m. | Harvard* | | Fitton Field; Worcester, MA | Spectrum News 1 | L 13–38 | 10,023 |
| October 16 | 1:30 p.m. | Georgetown | | Fitton Field; Worcester, MA | ESPN+ | W 48–14 | 4,518 |
| October 23 | 5:00 p.m. | Colgate | | Polar Park; Worcester, MA | Spectrum News 1 | W 42–10 | 9,508 |
| October 30 | 12:00 p.m. | at Lehigh | | Goodman Stadium; Bethlehem, PA | ESPN+ | W 31–12 | 3,211 |
| November 6 | 12:30 p.m. | Lafayette | | Fitton Field; Worcester, MA | ESPN+ | W 35–10 | 6,514 |
| November 13 | 1:00 p.m. | at Fordham | | Coffey Field; Bronx, NY | ESPN+ | W 52–24 | 3,265 |
| November 20 | 1:00 p.m. | at Bucknell | | Christy Mathewson–Memorial Stadium; Lewisburg, PA | | W 45–6 | 864 |
| November 27 | 12:00 p.m. | Sacred Heart* | No. 24 | Fitton Field; Worcester, MA (FCS Playoffs First Round) | ESPN+ | W 13–10 | 4,163 |
| December 3 | 7:00 p.m. | at No. 6 Villanova* | No. 24 | Villanova Stadium; Philadelphia, PA (FCS Playoffs Second Round) | ESPN+ | L 16–21 | 5,109 |
*Non-conference game; Rankings from STATS Poll released prior to the game; All times are in Eastern time

== Rankings ==
Ranking movements Legend: ██ Increase in ranking ██ Decrease in ranking — = Not ranked RV = Received votes т = Tied with team above or below
| | Week | | | | | | | | | | | | | |
| Poll | Pre | 1 | 2 | 3 | 4 | 5 | 6 | 7 | 8 | 9 | 10 | 11 | 12 | Final |
|---|---|---|---|---|---|---|---|---|---|---|---|---|---|---|
| STATS | RV | 24 | RV | — | RV | — | — | — | RV | — | RV | RV | 24 | 19 |
| FCS Coaches | RV | RV | — | RV | 24т | RV | RV | RV | RV | RV | RV | RV | 24 | 22 |

== Game summaries ==
=== At UConn ===
Holy Cross Crusaders at UConn Huskies – Game summary

| Quarter | 1 | 2 | 3 | 4 | Total |
|---|---|---|---|---|---|
| Crusaders | 7 | 17 | 7 | 7 | 38 |
| Huskies | 14 | 7 | 7 | 0 | 28 |

at Pratt & Whitney Stadium at Rentschler Field, East Hartford, Connecticut

- Date: September 4
- Game time: 12:00 p.m.
- Game weather: Sunny, 79 °F (26 °C)
- Game attendance: 18,782
- Referee: Jeff Pruitt
- TV announcers (CBSSN): Ed Cohen (play-by-play), Ross Tucker (color), and Tina Cervasio (sideline)
- Box score, Recap

Game information
First quarter
- HC – Matthew Sluka 6-yard run (Derek Ng kick), 10:36. Crusaders 7–0. Drive: 9 plays, 77 yards, 4:21.
- CONN – Keelan Marion 50-yard pass from Jack Zergiotis (Joe McFadden kick), 4:23. Tied 7–7. Drive: 2 plays, 61 yards, 0:29.
- CONN – Jack Zergiotis 1-yard run (Joe McFadden kick), 2:22. Huskies 14–7. Drive: 3 plays, 2 yards, 1:13.

Second quarter

- HC – Jason Modak 29-yard interception return (Derek Ng kick), 14:44. Tied 14–14.
- HC – Ayir Asante 24-yard pass from Matthew Sluka (Derek Ng kick), 6:54. Crusaders 21–14. Drive: 5 plays, 47 yards, 1:47.
- CONN – Keelan Marion 3-yard pass from Jack Zergiotis (Joe McFadden kick), 2:57. Tied 21–21. Drive: 11 plays, 75 yards, 3:57.
- HC – Derek Ng 30-yard field goal, 0:03. Crusaders 24–21. Drive: 11 plays, 62 yards, 2:54.

Third quarter

- HC – Tyler Purdy 3-yard pass from Matthew Sluka (Derek Ng kick), 6:43. Crusaders 31–21. Drive: 6 plays, 47 yards, 2:39.
- CONN – Jayce Medlock 8-yard pass from Jack Zergiotis (Joe McFadden kick), 3:18. Crusaders 31–28. Drive: 11 plays, 58 yards, 3:25.

Fourth quarter

- HC – Tyler Purdy 14-yard run (Derek Ng kick), 8:19. Crusaders 38–28. Drive: 4 plays, 98 yards, 2:06.

| Statistics | HC | CONN |
|---|---|---|
| First downs | 19 | 18 |
| Total yards | 363 | 262 |
| Rushing yards | 226 | 88 |
| Passing yards | 137 | 174 |
| Turnovers | 1 | 4 |
| Time of possession | 33:13 | 26:47 |

| Team | Category | Player | Statistics |
|---|---|---|---|
| Holy Cross | Passing | Matthew Sluka | 9/16, 140 yards, 2 TD |
| Holy Cross | Rushing | Matthew Sluka | 14 rushes, 112 yards, TD |
| Holy Cross | Receiving | Jalen Coker | 4 receptions, 75 yards |
| UConn | Passing | Jack Zergiotis | 17/41, 174 yards, 3 TD, 3 INT |
| UConn | Rushing | Kevin Mensah | 21 rushes, 66 yards |
| UConn | Receiving | Keelan Marion | 3 receptions, 60 yards, 2 TD |

This was the Crusaders' first win over an FBS opponent since 2002.
