= Stan Dakosty =

American football player and coach (born 1983)

Biographical details
- Born: January 2, 1983 (age 42); Hazleton, Pennsylvania, U.S.

Playing career
- 2001–2002: Colgate
- Position(s): Defensive back

Coaching career (HC unless noted)
- 2003–2004: Colgate (SA)
- 2005–2006: Amherst (RB)
- 2007–2009: Colgate (TE/FB)
- 2010–2016: Colgate (DB)
- 2017–2019: Colgate (AHC/DB)
- 2020: Colgate (AHC/co-DC/DB)
- 2021–2024: Colgate

Head coaching record
- Overall: 16–29

Stanley Dakosty Jr. (born January 2, 1983) is an American football coach who most recently served as the head coach at Colgate University. He also played college football at Colgate before suffering an injury and turning to coaching. Prior to being named head coach, Dakosty spent 15 of his 17-year coaching career with Colgate.

== Head coaching record ==
Year	Team	Overall	Conference	Standing	Bowl/playoffs
Colgate Raiders (Patriot League) (2021–2024)
2021	Colgate	5–6	5–1	2nd	
2022	Colgate	3–8	2–4	T–4th	
2023	Colgate	6–5	4–2	3rd	
2024	Colgate	2–10	1–5	7th	
Colgate:		16–29	12–12		
Total:		16–29			
^{†}Indicates Bowl Coalition, Bowl Alliance, BCS, or CFP / New Years' Six bowl.
