= 2021 Cornell Big Red football team =

American college football season

2021 Cornell Big Red football
- Conference: Ivy League
- Record: 2–8 (1–6 Ivy)
- Head coach: David Archer (8th season)
- Offensive coordinator: Joe Villapiano (4th season)
- Defensive coordinator: Jared Backus (8th season)
- Home stadium: Schoellkopf Field

2021 Ivy League football standings
	Conf.			Overall
Team	W		L	W		L
No. 20 Dartmouth +	6	–	1	9	–	1
No. 24 Princeton +	6	–	1	9	–	1
Harvard	5	–	2	8	–	2
Yale	4	–	3	5	–	5
Columbia	4	–	3	7	–	3
Penn	1	–	6	3	–	7
Brown	1	–	6	2	–	8
Cornell	1	–	6	2	–	8
+ – Conference co-champions; Rankings from STATS Poll

The 2021 Cornell Big Red football team represented Cornell University in the 2021 NCAA Division I FCS football season as a member of the Ivy League. The team was led by eighth-year head coach David Archer and played its home games at Schoellkopf Field. Cornell averaged 4,075 fans per game.

== Schedule ==
Date	Time	Opponent	Site	TV	Result	Attendance
September 18	2:00 p.m.	No. 22 VMI*	Schoellkopf Field; Ithaca, NY	ESPN+	L 21–31	12,555
September 25	12:00 p.m.	at Yale	Yale Bowl; New Haven, CT		L 17–23	4,916
October 2	3:30 p.m.	at Bucknell*	Christy Mathewson–Memorial Stadium; Lewisburg, PA		L 10–21	2,887
October 9	1:00 p.m.	at Harvard	Harvard Stadium; Boston, MA	ESPN+	L 10–24	7,414
October 15	7:00 p.m.	Colgate*	Schoellkopf Field; Ithaca, NY	ESPN+	W 34–20	2,294
October 23	1:00 p.m.	Brown	Schoellkopf Field; Ithaca, NY	ESPN+	L 45–49	1,964
October 29	7:00 p.m.	No. 19 Princeton	Schoellkopf Field; Ithaca, NY	ESPNU	L 16–34	1,542
November 6	1:00 p.m.	at Penn	Franklin Field; Philadelphia, PA	ESPN+	W 15–12	5,142
November 13	1:30 p.m.	at No. T–22 Dartmouth	Memorial Field; Hanover, NH	ESPN+	L 7–41	3,245
November 20	1:00 p.m.	Columbia	Schoellkopf Field; Ithaca, NY (rivalry)	ESPN+	L 26–34	2,020
*Non-conference game; Rankings from STATS Poll released prior to the game; All times are in Eastern time
