= 2021 Fordham Rams football team =

American college football season

2021 Fordham Rams football
- Conference: Patriot League
- Record: 6–5 (4–2 Patriot)
- Head coach: Joe Conlin (4th season)
- Offensive coordinator: Kevin Decker (3rd season)
- Defensive coordinator: Jameson Zacharias (2nd season)
- Home stadium: Coffey Field

2021 Patriot League football standings
| | Conf. | | | Overall |
| Team | W | | L | W | | L |
|---|---|---|---|---|---|---|
| No. 19 Holy Cross $^ | 6 | – | 0 | 10 | – | 3 |
| Colgate | 5 | – | 1 | 5 | – | 6 |
| Fordham | 4 | – | 2 | 6 | – | 5 |
| Lehigh | 3 | – | 3 | 3 | – | 8 |
| Lafayette | 2 | – | 4 | 3 | – | 8 |
| Georgetown | 1 | – | 5 | 2 | – | 8 |
| Bucknell | 0 | – | 6 | 1 | – | 10 |
$ – Conference champion; ^ – FCS playoff participant; Rankings from STATS Poll

The 2021 Fordham Rams football team represented Fordham University as a member of the Patriot League during the 2021 NCAA Division I FCS football season. Led by fourth-year head coach Joe Conlin, the Rams compiled an overall record of 6–5 with a mark of 4–2 in conference play, placing third in the Patriot League. Fordham played home games at Coffey Field in The Bronx.

== Schedule ==
| Date | Time | Opponent | Site | TV | Result | Attendance |
|---|---|---|---|---|---|---|
| September 4 | 12:00 p.m. | at Nebraska* | Memorial Stadium; Lincoln, NE | BTN | L 7–52 | 85,938 |
| September 11 | 6:00 p.m. | No. 20 Monmouth* | Coffey Field; Bronx, NY | ESPN+ | L 23–26 | 3,752 |
| September 18 | 6:00 p.m. | at Florida Atlantic * | FAU Stadium; Boca Raton, FL | ESPN3 | L 14–45 | 17,132 |
| September 25 | 3:30 p.m. | at Stony Brook * | Kenneth P. LaValle Stadium; Stony Brook, NY | | W 31–14 | 5,765 |
| October 2 | 3:30 p.m. | at Lafayette | Fisher Stadium; Easton, PA | | W 42–41 | 2,950 |
| October 9 | 1:00 p.m. | Wagner* ^{†} | Coffey Field; Bronx, NY | ESPN+ | W 56–7 | 3,258 |
| October 16 | 1:00 p.m. | Bucknell | Coffey Field; Bronx, NY | | W 66–21 | 1,363 |
| October 23 | 1:00 p.m. | Lehigh | Coffey Field; Bronx, NY | ESPN+ | W 35–28 | 0 |
| November 6 | 12:30 p.m. | at Georgetown | Cooper Field; Washington, DC | ESPN+ | W 41–20 | 2,501 |
| November 13 | 1:00 p.m. | Holy Cross | Coffey Field; Bronx, NY | ESPN+ | L 24–52 | 3,265 |
| November 20 | 12:00 p.m. | at Colgate | Crown Field at Andy Kerr Stadium; Hamilton, NY | ESPN+ | L 31–45 | 1,312 |
*Non-conference game; ^{†}Homecoming; Rankings from STATS Poll released prior to the game; All times are in Eastern time

== Game summaries ==
=== at Nebraska ===
Fordham Rams (0–0) vs Nebraska Cornhuskers (0–1) – Game summary

| Quarter | 1 | 2 | 3 | 4 | Total |
|---|---|---|---|---|---|
| Rams | 0 | 7 | 0 | 0 | 7 |
| Cornhuskers | 7 | 17 | 14 | 14 | 52 |

at Memorial Stadium • Lincoln, NE

- Date: September 4, 2021
- Game time: 11:00 a.m.
- Game weather: Cloudy, 68 °F (20 °C)
- Game attendance: 85,938
- Referee: Bryan Banks
- TV announcers (BTN): Mark Followill (play-by-play), Matt Millen (analyst), Elise Menaker (sideline)
- Sources: huskers.com

Game information

First quarter

- (3:59) NEB – Adrian Martinez 4-yard run, Connor Culp kick (Drive: 13 plays, 75 yards, 4:41; Nebraska 7–0)

Second quarter

- (14:14) FORD – Fotis Kokosioulis 31-yard pass from Tim DeMorat, Nick Leinenweber kick (Drive: 7 plays, 75 yards, 2:19; Tied 7–7)
- (11:36) NEB – Connor Culp 39-yard field goal (Drive: 7 plays, 58 yards, 2:33; Nebraska 10–7)
- (3:56) NEB – Adrian Martinez 4-yard run, Connor Culp kick (Drive: 8 plays, 69 yards, 3:44; Nebraska 17–7)
- (0:29) NEB – Sevion Morrison 1-yard run, Connor Culp kick (Drive: 9 plays, 83 yards, 1:58; Nebraska 24–7)

Third quarter

- (8:24) NEB – Chancellor Brewington 2-yard pass from Adrian Martinez, Connor Culp kick (Drive: 9 plays, 64 yards, 3:40; Nebraska 31–7)
- (3:58) NEB – Samori Toure 8-yard run, Connor Culp kick (Drive: 10 plays, 35 yards, 2:53; Nebraska 38–7)

Fourth quarter

- (14:26) NEB – Sevion Morrison 6-yard run, Connor Culp kick (Drive: 10 plays, 58 yards, 3:41; Nebraska 45–7)
- (1:43) NEB – Marvin Scott III 6-yard run, Connor Culp kick (Drive: 15 plays, 62 yards, 7:13; Nebraska 52–7)

| Statistics | FORD | NEB |
|---|---|---|
| First downs | 12 | 34 |
| Total yards | 292 | 633 |
| Rushes/yards | 28–129 | 65–329 |
| Passing yards | 163 | 304 |
| Passing: Comp–Att–Int | 18–30–3 | 21–30–0 |
| Time of possession | 23:39 | 35:21 |

| Team | Category | Player | Statistics |
|---|---|---|---|
| Fordham | Passing | Tim DeMorat | 17/29, 165 yards, TD, 3 INT |
| Fordham | Rushing | Trey Wilson III | 13 carries, 75 yards |
| Fordham | Receiving | DeQuece Carter | 5 receptions, 69 yards |
| Nebraska | Passing | Adrian Martinez | 17/23, 254 yards, 1 TD |
| Nebraska | Rushing | Markese Stepp | 18 carries, 101 yards |
| Nebraska | Receiving | Samori Toure | 8 receptions, 133 yards |
