= 2021 Lafayette Leopards football team =

American college football season

2021 Lafayette Leopards football
- Conference: Patriot League
- Record: 3–8 (2–4 Patriot)
- Head coach: John Garrett (5th season)
- Defensive coordinator: Doug McFadden (2nd season)
- Home stadium: Fisher Stadium

2021 Patriot League football standings
	Conf.			Overall
Team	W		L	W		L
No. 19 Holy Cross $^	6	–	0	10	–	3
Colgate	5	–	1	5	–	6
Fordham	4	–	2	6	–	5
Lehigh	3	–	3	3	–	8
Lafayette	2	–	4	3	–	8
Georgetown	1	–	5	2	–	8
Bucknell	0	–	6	1	–	10
$ – Conference champion; ^ – FCS playoff participant; Rankings from STATS Poll

The 2021 Lafayette Leopards football team represented Lafayette College in the 2021 NCAA Division I FCS football season. The Leopards, led by fifth-year head coach John Garrett, played their home games at Fisher Stadium as a member of the Patriot League.

After the season concluded with the loss to Lehigh at 10-17, Garrett was fired from his position as the head coach.

== Schedule ==
Date	Time	Opponent	Site	TV	Result	Attendance
September 4	2:00 p.m.	at Air Force*	Falcon Stadium; Colorado Springs, CO	Stadium	L 14–35	30,012
September 11	6:00 p.m.	at William & Mary*	Zable Stadium; Williamsburg, VA		L 3–24	6,162
September 18	12:30 p.m.	No. 23 New Hampshire*	Fisher Stadium; Easton, PA	ESPN+	L 13–19	2,623
September 25	3:30 p.m.	Penn*	Fisher Stadium; Easton, PA		W 24–14	3,730
October 2	3:30 p.m.	Fordham	Fisher Stadium; Easton, PA		L 41–42	2,950
October 9	12:30 p.m.	Bucknell	Fisher Stadium; Easton, PA		W 27–0	2,705
October 16	1:00 p.m.	at Harvard*	Harvard Stadium; Allston, MA	ESPN+	L 3–30	5,641
October 30	12:30 p.m.	at Georgetown	Cooper Field; Washington, DC	ESPN+	W 24–23	1,091
November 6	12:00 p.m.	at Holy Cross	Fitton Field; Worcester, MA	ESPN+	L 10–35	6,514
November 13	12:30 p.m.	at Colgate	Fisher Stadium; Easton, PA	ESPN+	L 13–20	2,296
November 20	12:30 p.m.	at Lehigh	Goodman Stadium; Bethlehem, PA	ESPN+	L 10–17	12,962
*Non-conference game; Rankings from STATS Poll released prior to the game; All times are in Eastern time

== Game summaries ==
=== at Air Force ===
Lafayette at Air Force

Team	1	2	3	4	Total
Leopards	0	7	7	0	14
• Falcons	14	14	0	7	35

- Date: September 4, 2021
- Location: Falcon Stadium
  Colorado Springs, CO
- Game start: 12:06 p.m. MDT
- Elapsed time: 3 hours and 12 minutes
- Game attendance: 30,012
- Game weather: Temperature: N/A • Weather: Sunny • Wind: N/A
- Referee: Christian Walker
- TV announcers (Stadium): Chris Hassel (play–by–play) and Sherdrick Bonner (analyst)

Scoring summary
1	08:01	AF	Micah Davis 10–yard run (Matthew Dapore kick) (10 plays, 59 yards, 4:53)	AF 7–0
1	00:25	AF	Haaziq Daniels 7–yard run (Matthew Dapore kick) (10 plays, 65 yards, 4:49)	AF 14–0
2	09:05	LAF	Julius Young 23–yard pass from Rent Montie (Micah Pettit kick) (13 plays, 83 yards, 6:16)	AF 14–7
2	03:09	AF	Micah Davis 16–yard run (Matthew Dapore kick failed) (12 plays, 75 yards, 5:56)	AF 20–7
2	00:18	AF	Haaziq Daniels 2–yard run (DeAndre Hughes rush) (7 plays, 40 yards, 1:20)	AF 28–7
3	07:50	LAF	Selwyn Simpson 3–yard run (Micah Pettit kick) (10 plays, 68 yards, 5:11)	AF 28–14
4	06:10	AF	Haaziq Daniels 19–yard run (Matthew Dapore kick) (8 plays, 68 yards, 4:02)	AF 35–14

Statistics	Lafayette	Air Force
First downs	12	24
Total yards	287	420
Rushing yards	43	370
Passing yards	244	50
Turnovers	2	0
Time of possession	25:39	34:21

Team	Category	Player	Statistics
Lafayette	Passing	Aaron Angelos	10/16, 158 yards
Lafayette	Rushing	Jaden Sutton	7 carries, 38 yards
Lafayette	Receiving	Julius Young	8 receptions, 147 yards, 1 TD
Air Force	Passing	Haaziq Daniels	3/5, 50 yards
Air Force	Rushing	Brad Roberts	25 carries, 111 yards
Air Force	Receiving	Micah Davis	2 receptions, 27 yards
