= 2021 Bucknell Bison football team =

American college football season

2021 Bucknell Bison football
- Conference: Patriot League
- Record: 1–10 (0–6 Patriot)
- Head coach: Dave Cecchini (3rd season)
- Offensive coordinator: Jason Miran (3rd season)
- Defensive coordinator: Isaac Collins (1st season)
- Home stadium: Christy Mathewson–Memorial Stadium

2021 Patriot League football standings
	Conf.			Overall
Team	W		L	W		L
No. 19 Holy Cross $^	6	–	0	10	–	3
Colgate	5	–	1	5	–	6
Fordham	4	–	2	6	–	5
Lehigh	3	–	3	3	–	8
Lafayette	2	–	4	3	–	8
Georgetown	1	–	5	2	–	8
Bucknell	0	–	6	1	–	10
$ – Conference champion; ^ – FCS playoff participant; Rankings from STATS Poll

The 2021 Bucknell Bison football team represented Bucknell University in the 2021 NCAA Division I FCS football season. The Bison, led by third-year head coach Dave Cecchini, played their home games at Christy Mathewson–Memorial Stadium as a member of the Patriot League.

== Schedule ==
Date	Time	Opponent	Site	TV	Result	Attendance
September 4	6:00 p.m.	at Sacred Heart*	Campus Field; Fairfield, CT		L 0–21	4,201
September 11	6:00 p.m.	at No. 12 Villanova*	Villanova Stadium; Villanova, PA		L 3–55	8,219
September 18	6:00 p.m.	Penn*	Christy Mathewson–Memorial Stadium; Lewisburg, PA		L 6–30	5,856
October 2	3:30 p.m.	Cornell*	Christy Mathewson–Memorial Stadium; Lewisburg, PA		W 21–10	2,887
October 9	12:30	at Lafayette	Fisher Stadium; Easton, PA		L 0–27	2,705
October 16	1:00 p.m.	at Fordham	Coffey Field; Bronx, NY		L 21–66	1,363
October 23	1:00 p.m.	Georgetown	Christy Mathewson–Memorial Stadium; Lewisburg, PA	ESPN+	L 21–29	1,091
October 30	1:00 p.m.	at Colgate	Crown Field at Andy Kerr Stadium; Hamilton, NY	ESPN+	L 10–33	1,505
November 6	1:00 p.m.	Lehigh	Christy Mathewson–Memorial Stadium; Lewisburg, PA	ESPN+	L 6–38	1,376
November 13	12:00 p.m.	at Army*	Michie Stadium; West Point, NY	CBSSN	L 10–63	26,887
November 20	1:00 p.m.	Holy Cross	Christy Mathewson–Memorial Stadium; Lewisburg, PA		L 6–45	864
*Non-conference game; Rankings from STATS Poll released prior to the game; All times are in Eastern time
