= 2021 Lehigh Mountain Hawks football team =

American college football season

2021 Lehigh Mountain Hawks football
- Conference: Patriot League
- Record: 3–8 (3–3 Patriot)
- Head coach: Tom Gilmore (3rd season)
- Offensive coordinator: Scott Brisson (5th season)
- Defensive coordinator: Mike Kashurba (3rd season)
- Home stadium: Goodman Stadium

Uniform
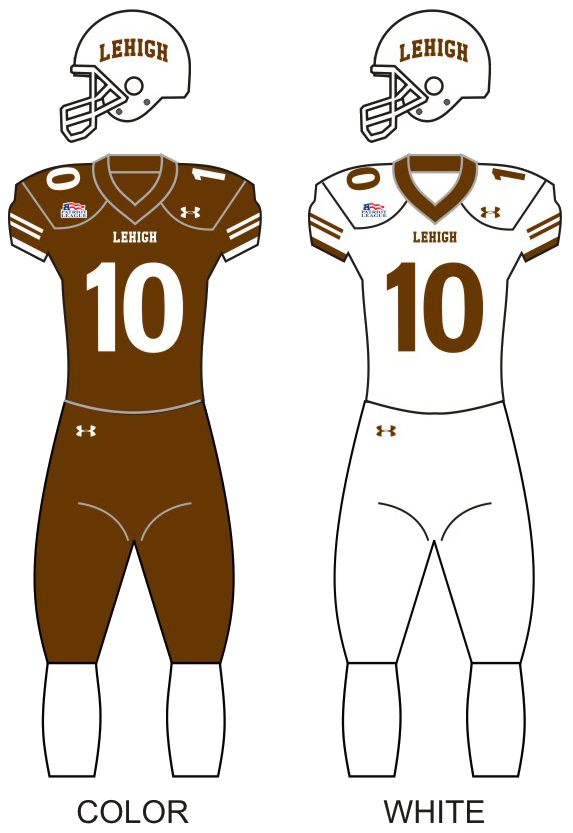

2021 Patriot League football standings
	Conf.			Overall
Team	W		L	W		L
No. 19 Holy Cross $^	6	–	0	10	–	3
Colgate	5	–	1	5	–	6
Fordham	4	–	2	6	–	5
Lehigh	3	–	3	3	–	8
Lafayette	2	–	4	3	–	8
Georgetown	1	–	5	2	–	8
Bucknell	0	–	6	1	–	10
$ – Conference champion; ^ – FCS playoff participant; Rankings from STATS Poll

The 2021 Lehigh Mountain Hawks football team represented Lehigh University in the 2021 NCAA Division I FCS football season. The Mountain Hawks, led by third-year head coach Tom Gilmore, played their home games at Goodman Stadium as a member of the Patriot League.

The 17–10 victory over rival Lafayette led to Lafayette head coach John Garrett getting fired by Lafayette.

== Schedule ==
Date	Time	Opponent	Site	TV	Result	Attendance
September 4	12:00 p.m.	No. 16 Villanova*	Goodman Stadium; Bethlehem, PA		L 3–47	4,101
September 11	2:00 p.m.	at No. 25 Richmond*	E. Claiborne Robins Stadium; Richmond, VA		L 3–31	6,003
September 18	12:00 p.m.	Princeton*	Goodman Stadium; Bethlehem, PA		L 0–32	7,050
September 25	1:00 p.m.	at Colgate	Crown Field at Andy Kerr Stadium; Hamilton, NY		L 3–30	2,684
October 2	12:00 p.m.	Yale*	Goodman Stadium; Bethlehem, PA		L 0–34	3,528
October 9	1:00 p.m.	at Penn*	Franklin Field; Philadelphia, PA	ESPN+	L 0–20	4,278
October 23	1:00 p.m.	at Fordham	Coffey Field; The Bronx, NY	ESPN+	L 28–35	0
October 30	12:00 p.m.	Holy Cross	Goodman Stadium; Bethlehem, PA	ESPN+	L 12–30	3,211
November 6	1:00 p.m.	at Bucknell	Christy Mathewson–Memorial Stadium; Lewisburg, PA	ESPN+	W 38–6	1,376
November 13	12:00 p.m.	Georgetown	Goodman Stadium; Bethlehem, PA	ESPN+	W 23–9	2,984
November 20	12:00 p.m.	Lafayette	Goodman Stadium; Bethlehem, PA	ESPN+	W 17–10	12,962
*Non-conference game; Rankings from STATS Poll released prior to the game; All times are in Eastern time
