= 2021 Brown Bears football team =

American college football season

2021 Brown Bears football

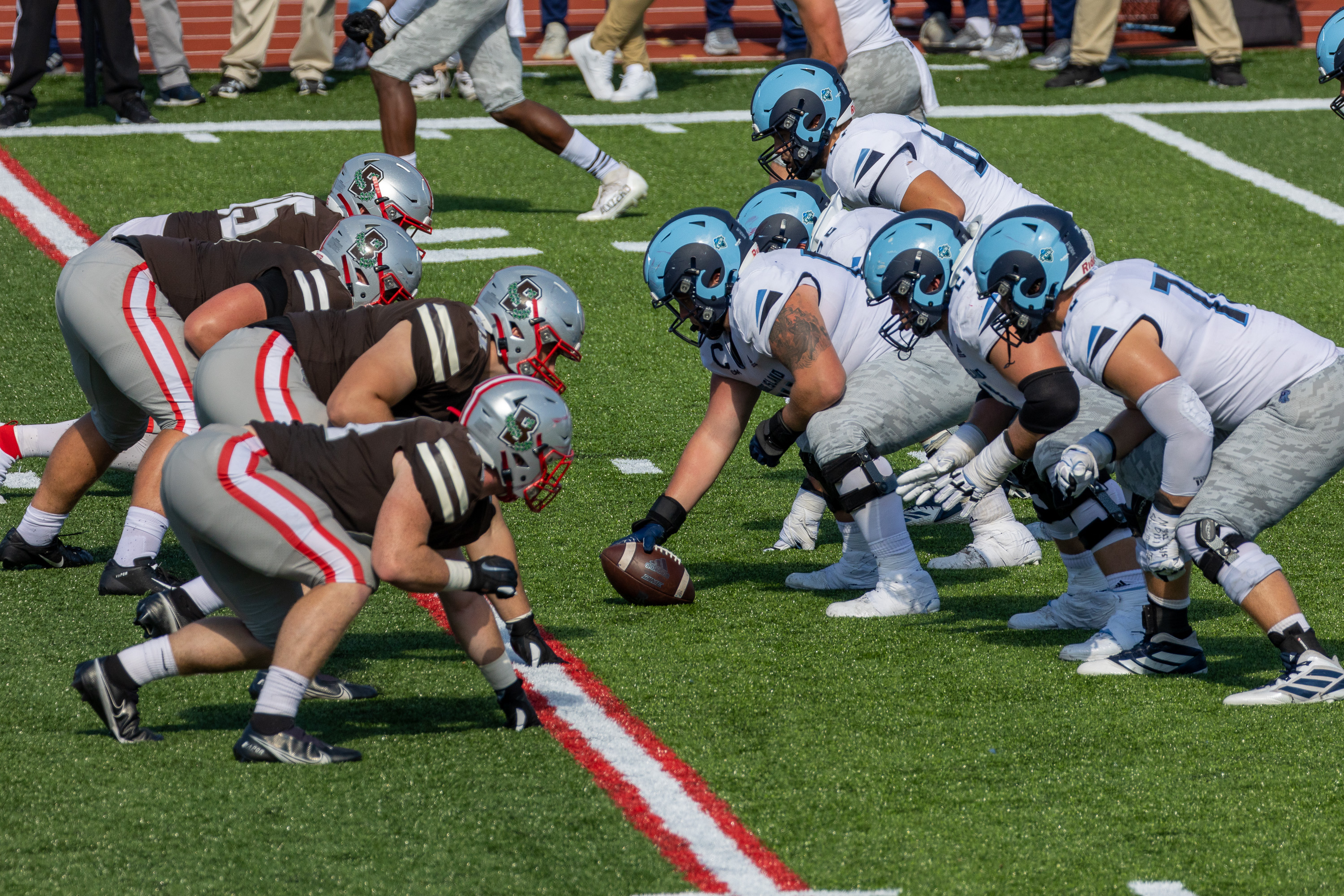
- The Bears lost to the Rhode Island Rams, 24-45.
- Conference: Ivy League
- Record: 2–8 (1–6 Ivy)
- Head coach: James Perry (2nd season)
- Offensive coordinator: Vinny Marino (2nd season)
- Offensive scheme: Air raid
- Defensive coordinator: Tim Weaver (2nd season)
- Base defense: 3–4
- Home stadium: Richard Gouse Field at Brown Stadium

2021 Ivy League football standings
	Conf.			Overall
Team	W		L	W		L
No. 20 Dartmouth +	6	–	1	9	–	1
No. 24 Princeton +	6	–	1	9	–	1
Harvard	5	–	2	8	–	2
Yale	4	–	3	5	–	5
Columbia	4	–	3	7	–	3
Penn	1	–	6	3	–	7
Brown	1	–	6	2	–	8
Cornell	1	–	6	2	–	8
+ – Conference co-champions; Rankings from STATS Poll

The 2021 Brown Bears football team represented Brown University as a member of the Ivy League during the 2021 NCAA Division I FCS football season. Led by second-year head coach James Perry, the Bears compiled an overall record of 2–8 with a mark of 1–6 in conference play, placing in a three-way tie for sixth in the Ivy League. Brown played home games at Richard Gouse Field at Brown Stadium in Providence, Rhode Island.

Quarterback E. J. Perry was awarded the Ivy League Bushnell Cup in December 2021. He became the fifth Brown player to receive the award since it began in 1970. Perry is the nephew of coach James Perry, who received the Bushnell Cup in 1999.

== Schedule ==
Date	Time	Opponent	Site	TV	Result	Attendance
September 18	12:30 p.m.	Rhode Island*	Richard Gouse Field at Brown Stadium; Providence, RI (rivalry)	ESPN+	L 24–45	5,243
September 24	7:00 p.m.	at Harvard	Harvard Stadium; Boston, MA	ESPNU	L 17–49	20,748
October 2	4:00 p.m.	at Bryant*	Beirne Stadium; Smithfield, RI	NEC Front Row	L 29–36	2,805
October 9	12:30 p.m.	Colgate*	Richard Gouse Field at Brown Stadium; Providence, RI	ESPN+	W 31–10	2,620
October 16	12:30 p.m.	No. 25 Princeton	Richard Gouse Field at Brown Stadium; Providence, RI	ESPN+	L 42–56	4,880
October 23	1:00 p.m.	at Cornell	Schoellkopf Field; Ithaca, NY	ESPN+	W 49-45	1,964
October 30	1:00 p.m.	at Penn	Franklin Field; Philadelphia, PA	ESPN+	L 17-45	3,283
November 6	12:30 p.m.	Yale	Richard Gouse Field at Brown Stadium; Providence, RI	ESPN+	L 38-63	4,084
November 13	1:00 p.m.	at Columbia	Robert K. Kraft Field at Lawrence A. Wien Stadium; New York, NY	ESPN+	L 17–23	3,918
November 20	12:00 p.m.	No. 20 Dartmouth	Richard Gouse Field at Brown Stadium; Providence, RI	ESPN+	L 31–52	0
*Non-conference game; Rankings from STATS Poll released prior to the game; All times are in Eastern time
