= 2021 Harvard Crimson football team =

American college football season

2021 Harvard Crimson football
- Conference: Ivy League
- Record: 8–2 (5–2 Ivy)
- Head coach: Tim Murphy (27th season)
- Offensive coordinator: Mickey Fein (1st season)
- Offensive scheme: Pro spread
- Defensive coordinator: Scott Larkee (12th season)
- Base defense: 4–3
- Home stadium: Harvard Stadium

2021 Ivy League football standings
	Conf.			Overall
Team	W		L	W		L
No. 20 Dartmouth +	6	–	1	9	–	1
No. 24 Princeton +	6	–	1	9	–	1
Harvard	5	–	2	8	–	2
Yale	4	–	3	5	–	5
Columbia	4	–	3	7	–	3
Penn	1	–	6	3	–	7
Brown	1	–	6	2	–	8
Cornell	1	–	6	2	–	8
+ – Conference co-champions; Rankings from STATS Poll

The 2021 Harvard Crimson football team represented Harvard University in the 2021 NCAA Division I FCS football season as a member of the Ivy League. The team was led by 27th-year head coach Tim Murphy and played its home games at Harvard Stadium. Harvard averaged 11,201 fans per game.

== Schedule ==
Date	Time	Opponent	Site	TV	Result	Attendance
September 18	12:30 pm	at Georgetown*	Cooper Field; Washington, DC	ESPN+	W 44–9	2,509
September 25	7:00 p.m.	Brown	Harvard Stadium; Boston, MA	ESPNU	W 49–17	20,748
October 2	1:30 p.m.	at Holy Cross*	Fitton Field; Worcester, MA		W 38–13	10,023
October 9	1:00 p.m.	Cornell	Harvard Stadium; Boston, MA	ESPN+	W 24-10	7,414
October 16	1:00 p.m.	Lafayette*	Harvard Stadium; Boston, MA	ESPN+	W 30–3	5,641
October 23	1:00 p.m.	at No. 22 Princeton	Powers Field at Princeton Stadium; Princeton, NJ (rivalry)	ESPN+	L 16-18 ^{5OT}	10,033
October 30	1:00 p.m.	Dartmouth	Harvard Stadium; Boston, MA	ESPN+	L 17-20	14,110
November 6	1:00 p.m.	at Columbia	Robert K. Kraft Field at Lawrence A. Wien Stadium; New York, NY	ESPN+	W 49-21	5,572
November 13	12:00 p.m.	Penn	Harvard Stadium; Boston, MA	ESPN+	W 23-7	8,094
November 20	12:00 p.m.	at Yale	Yale Bowl; New Haven, CT	ESPNU	W 34-31	49,500
*Non-conference game; Rankings from STATS Poll released prior to the game; All times are in Eastern time
