= 2021 Columbia Lions football team =

American college football season

2021 Columbia Lions football
- Conference: Ivy League
- Record: 7–3 (4–3 Ivy)
- Head coach: Al Bagnoli (6th season)
- Offensive coordinator: Mark Fabish (7th season)
- Defensive coordinator: Paul Ferraro (6th season)
- Home stadium: Robert K. Kraft Field at Lawrence A. Wien Stadium

2021 Ivy League football standings
	Conf.			Overall
Team	W		L	W		L
No. 20 Dartmouth +	6	–	1	9	–	1
No. 24 Princeton +	6	–	1	9	–	1
Harvard	5	–	2	8	–	2
Yale	4	–	3	5	–	5
Columbia	4	–	3	7	–	3
Penn	1	–	6	3	–	7
Brown	1	–	6	2	–	8
Cornell	1	–	6	2	–	8
+ – Conference co-champions; Rankings from STATS Poll

The 2021 Columbia Lions football team represented Columbia University in the 2021 NCAA Division I FCS football season as a member of the Ivy League. The team was led by sixth-year head coach Al Bagnoli and played its home games at Robert K. Kraft Field at Lawrence A. Wien Stadium. Columbia averaged 5,549 fans per game.

== Schedule ==
Date	Time	Opponent	Site	TV	Result	Attendance
September 18	1:00 p.m.	Marist*	Robert K. Kraft Field at Lawrence A. Wien Stadium; New York, NY		W 37–14	3,479
September 25	1:00 p.m.	Georgetown*	Robert K. Kraft Field at Lawrence A. Wien Stadium; New York, NY		W 35–24	3,723
October 2	1:00 p.m.	at Princeton	Powers Field at Princeton Stadium; Princeton, NJ		L 7–24	5,926
October 9	1:00 p.m.	at Central Connecticut*	Arute Field; New Britain, CT		W 22–20	4,117
October 16	1:30 p.m.	Penn^{†}	Robert K. Kraft Field at Lawrence A. Wien Stadium; New York, NY	ESPN+	W 23–14	11,054
October 22	6:00 p.m.	at No. 25 Dartmouth	Memorial Field; Hanover, NH	ESPNU	W 19–0	5,122
October 30	12:00 p.m.	at Yale	Yale Bowl; New Haven, CT	ESPN+	L 30–37	3,437
November 6	1:00 p.m.	Harvard	Robert K. Kraft Field at Lawrence A. Wien Stadium; New York, NY	ESPN+	L 21–49	5,572
November 13	1:00 p.m.	Brown	Robert K. Kraft Field at Lawrence A. Wien Stadium; New York, NY	ESPN+	W 23–17	3,918
November 20	1:00 p.m.	at Cornell	Schoellkopf Field; Ithaca, NY (rivalry)	ESPN+	W 34–26	2,020
*Non-conference game; ^{†}Homecoming; Rankings from STATS Poll released prior to the game; All times are in Eastern time
