= 2021 Colgate Raiders football team =

American college football season

2021 Colgate Raiders football
- Conference: Patriot League
- Record: 5–6 (5–1 Patriot)
- Head coach: Stan Dakosty (1st season)
- Co-offensive coordinators: Brent Bassham (2nd season); Terry Dow (3rd season)
- Defensive coordinator: Paul Shaffner (9th season)
- Home stadium: Crown Field at Andy Kerr Stadium

2021 Patriot League football standings
	Conf.			Overall
Team	W		L	W		L
No. 19 Holy Cross $^	6	–	0	10	–	3
Colgate	5	–	1	5	–	6
Fordham	4	–	2	6	–	5
Lehigh	3	–	3	3	–	8
Lafayette	2	–	4	3	–	8
Georgetown	1	–	5	2	–	8
Bucknell	0	–	6	1	–	10
$ – Conference champion; ^ – FCS playoff participant; Rankings from STATS Poll

The 2021 Colgate Raiders football team represented Colgate University in the 2021 NCAA Division I FCS football season. The Raiders, led by 1st-year head coach Stan Dakosty, played their home games at Crown Field at Andy Kerr Stadium as a member of the Patriot League.

== Schedule ==
Date	Time	Opponent	Site	TV	Result	Attendance
September 4	12:00 p.m.	at Boston College*	Alumni Stadium; Chestnut Hill, MA	ACCN	L 0–51	28,991
September 11	1:00 p.m.	Stony Brook*	Crown Field at Andy Kerr Stadium; Hamilton, NY		L 3–24	3,544
September 18	1:00 p.m.	William & Mary*	Crown Field at Andy Kerr Stadium; Hamilton, NY	ESPN+	L 7–27	1,165
September 25	1:00 p.m.	Lehigh	Crown Field at Andy Kerr Stadium; Hamilton, NY		W 30–3	2,684
October 2	12:30 p.m.	at Georgetown	Cooper Field; Washington, DC	ESPN+	W 28–21	1,613
October 9	12:30 p.m.	at Brown*	Richard Gouse Field at Brown Stadium; Providence, RI	ESPN+	L 10–31	2,620
October 15	7:00 p.m.	at Cornell*	Schoellkopf Field; Ithaca, NY	ESPN+	L 20–34	2,294
October 23	5:00 p.m.	at Holy Cross	Polar Park; Worcester, MA	ESPN+	L 10–42	9,508
October 30	1:00 p.m.	Bucknell	Crown Field at Andy Kerr Stadium; Hamilton, NY	ESPN+	W 33–10	1,505
November 13	12:30 p.m.	at Lafayette	Fisher Stadium; Easton, PA	ESPN+	W 20–13	2,296
November 20	1:00 p.m.	Fordham	Crown Field at Andy Kerr Stadium; Hamilton, NY	ESPN+	W 45–31	1,312
*Non-conference game; Rankings from STATS Poll released prior to the game; All times are in Eastern time
