= 2021 Dartmouth Big Green football team =

American college football season

2021 Dartmouth Big Green football

Ivy League co-champion
- Conference: Ivy League

Ranking
- STATS: No. 20
- FCS Coaches: No. 23
- Record: 9–1 (6–1 Ivy)
- Head coach: Buddy Teevens (21st season)
- Offensive coordinator: Kevin Daft (4th season)
- Offensive scheme: Option
- Defensive coordinator: Don Dobes (11th season)
- Base defense: 4–3
- Home stadium: Memorial Field

2021 Ivy League football standings
	Conf.			Overall
Team	W		L	W		L
No. 20 Dartmouth +	6	–	1	9	–	1
No. 24 Princeton +	6	–	1	9	–	1
Harvard	5	–	2	8	–	2
Yale	4	–	3	5	–	5
Columbia	4	–	3	7	–	3
Penn	1	–	6	3	–	7
Brown	1	–	6	2	–	8
Cornell	1	–	6	2	–	8
+ – Conference co-champions; Rankings from STATS Poll

The 2021 Dartmouth Big Green football team represented Dartmouth College in the 2021 NCAA Division I FCS football season as a member of the Ivy League. The team was led by 21st-year head coach Buddy Teevens and played its home games at Memorial Field. Dartmouth averaged 5,480 fans per game.

== Schedule ==
Date	Time	Opponent	Rank	Site	TV	Result	Attendance
September 18	2:00 p.m.	at Valparaiso*		Brown Field; Valparaiso, IN		W 28–18	3,856
September 25	1:30 p.m.	Sacred Heart*		Memorial Field; Hanover, NH		W 41–3	5,121
October 1	7:00 p.m.	at Penn		Franklin Field; Philadelphia, PA	ESPNU	W 31–7	8,177
October 9	1:30 p.m.	Yale		Memorial Field; Hanover, NH	ESPN+	W 24–17 ^{OT}	10,079
October 16	1:00 p.m.	at No. 23 New Hampshire*		Wildcat Stadium; Durham, NH		W 38–21	15,394
October 22	6:00 p.m.	Columbia	No. 25	Memorial Field; Hanover, NH	ESPNU	L 0–19	5,122
October 30	12:00 p.m.	at Harvard		Harvard Stadium; Boston, MA	ESPN+	W 20–17	14,110
November 6	6:00 p.m.	No. T–20 Princeton		Memorial Field; Hanover, NH	ESPNU	W 31–7	3,834
November 13	1:30 p.m.	Cornell	No. T–22	Memorial Field; Hanover, NH	ESPN+	W 41–7	3,245
November 20	12:00 p.m.	at Brown	No. 20	Richard Gouse Field at Brown Stadium; Providence, RI	ESPN+	W 52–31	0
*Non-conference game; Rankings from STATS Poll released prior to the game; All times are in Eastern time
