= 2021 Georgetown Hoyas football team =

American college football season

2021 Georgetown Hoyas football
- Conference: Patriot League
- Record: 2–8 (1–5 Patriot)
- Head coach: Rob Sgarlata (7th season)
- Offensive coordinator: Rob Spence (3rd season)
- Defensive coordinator: Kevin Doherty (4th season)
- Home stadium: Cooper Field

2021 Patriot League football standings
	Conf.			Overall
Team	W		L	W		L
No. 19 Holy Cross $^	6	–	0	10	–	3
Colgate	5	–	1	5	–	6
Fordham	4	–	2	6	–	5
Lehigh	3	–	3	3	–	8
Lafayette	2	–	4	3	–	8
Georgetown	1	–	5	2	–	8
Bucknell	0	–	6	1	–	10
$ – Conference champion; ^ – FCS playoff participant; Rankings from STATS Poll

The 2021 Georgetown Hoyas football team represented Georgetown University as a member of the Patriot League during the 2021 NCAA Division I FCS football season. The Hoyas, led by seventh-year head coach Rob Sgarlata, played their home games at Cooper Field.

== Schedule ==
Date	Time	Opponent	Site	TV	Result	Attendance
September 4		Marist*	Cooper Field; Washington, DC		Cancelled (Note: The Marist at Georgetown game was cancelled on August 31, 2021, due to COVID-19 problems within the Georgetown program.)	
September 11	2:00 p.m.	at Delaware State*	Alumni Stadium; Dover, DE		W 20–14	2,442
September 18	12:30 p.m.	Harvard*	Cooper Field; Washington, DC	ESPN+	L 9–44	2,509
September 25	1:00 p.m.	at Columbia*	Robert K. Kraft Field at Lawrence A. Wien Stadium; New York, NY		L 24–35	3,723
October 2	12:30 p.m.	Colgate	Cooper Field; Washington, DC	ESPN+	L 21–28	1,613
October 16	1:30 p.m.	at Holy Cross	Fitton Field; Worcester, MA	ESPN+	L 14–48	4,518
October 23	1:00 p.m.	at Bucknell	Christy Mathewson–Memorial Stadium; Lewisburg, PA	ESPN+	W 29–21	1,091
October 30	12:30 p.m.	Lafayette	Cooper Field; Washington, DC	ESPN+	L 23–24	1,091
November 6	12:30 p.m.	Fordham	Cooper Field; Washington, DC	ESPN+	L 20–41	2,501
November 13	12:00 p.m.	at Lehigh	Goodman Stadium; Bethlehem, PA	ESPN+	L 9–23	2,984
November 20	12:00 p.m.	at Morgan State	Hughes Stadium; Baltimore, MD	ESPN+	L 21–28	576
*Non-conference game; All times are in Eastern time
