= 2021 Penn Quakers football team =

American college football season

2021 Penn Quakers football
- Conference: Ivy League
- Record: 3–7 (1–6 Ivy)
- Head coach: Ray Priore (6th season)
- Offensive coordinator: Kevin Morris (2nd season)
- Offensive scheme: Pro-style
- Defensive coordinator: Bob Benson (6th season)
- Base defense: 3–3–5
- Home stadium: Franklin Field

2021 Ivy League football standings
	Conf.			Overall
Team	W		L	W		L
No. 20 Dartmouth +	6	–	1	9	–	1
No. 24 Princeton +	6	–	1	9	–	1
Harvard	5	–	2	8	–	2
Yale	4	–	3	5	–	5
Columbia	4	–	3	7	–	3
Penn	1	–	6	3	–	7
Brown	1	–	6	2	–	8
Cornell	1	–	6	2	–	8
+ – Conference co-champions; Rankings from STATS Poll

The 2021 Penn Quakers football team represented the University of Pennsylvania in the 2021 NCAA Division I FCS football season as a member of the Ivy League. The team was led by sixth-year head coach Ray Priore and played its home games at Franklin Field. Penn averaged 4,971 fans per game.

== Schedule ==
Date	Time	Opponent	Site	TV	Result	Attendance
September 18	6:00 p.m.	at Bucknell*	Christy Mathewson–Memorial Stadium; Lewisburg, PA		W 30–6	5,856
September 25	3:30 p.m.	at Lafayette*	Fisher Stadium; Easton, PA		L 14–24	3,730
October 1	7:00 p.m.	Dartmouth	Franklin Field; Philadelphia, PA	ESPNU	L 7–31	8,177
October 9	1:00 p.m.	Lehigh*	Franklin Field; Philadelphia, PA	ESPN+	W 20–0	4,278
October 16	1:30 p.m.	at Columbia	Robert K. Kraft Field at Lawrence A. Wien Stadium; New York, NY	ESPN+	L 14–23	11,054
October 23	12:00 p.m.	at Yale	Yale Bowl; New Haven, CT	ESPN+	L 28–42	4,475
October 30	1:00 p.m.	Brown	Franklin Field; Philadelphia, PA	ESPN+	W 45–17	3,283
November 6	1:00 p.m.	Cornell	Franklin Field; Philadelphia, PA	ESPN+	L 12–15	5,142
November 13	12:00 p.m.	at Harvard	Harvard Stadium; Allston, MA	ESPN+	L 7–23	8,094
November 20	1:00 p.m.	No. 24 Princeton	Franklin Field; Philadelphia, PA	ESPN+	L 14–34	3,975
*Non-conference game; Rankings from STATS Poll released prior to the game; All times are in Eastern time
