= 2021 Princeton Tigers football team =

American college football season

2021 Princeton Tigers football

Ivy League co-champion
- Conference: Ivy League

Ranking
- STATS: No. 24
- FCS Coaches: No. 21
- Record: 9–1 (6–1 Ivy)
- Head coach: Bob Surace (11th season)
- Offensive coordinator: Mike Willis (1st season)
- Offensive scheme: Spread
- Defensive coordinator: Steve Verbit (8th season)
- Base defense: 4–2–5
- Home stadium: Powers Field at Princeton Stadium

2021 Ivy League football standings
	Conf.			Overall
Team	W		L	W		L
No. 20 Dartmouth +	6	–	1	9	–	1
No. 24 Princeton +	6	–	1	9	–	1
Harvard	5	–	2	8	–	2
Yale	4	–	3	5	–	5
Columbia	4	–	3	7	–	3
Penn	1	–	6	3	–	7
Brown	1	–	6	2	–	8
Cornell	1	–	6	2	–	8
+ – Conference co-champions; Rankings from STATS Poll

The 2021 Princeton Tigers football team represented Princeton University in the 2021 NCAA Division I FCS football season as a member of the Ivy League. The team was led by 11th-year head coach Bob Surace and played its home games at Powers Field at Princeton Stadium. Princeton averaged 7,018 fans per game.

== Schedule ==
Date	Time	Opponent	Rank	Site	TV	Result	Attendance
September 18	12:00 p.m.	at Lehigh*		Goodman Stadium; Bethlehem, PA		W 32–0	7,050
September 25	1:00 p.m.	Stetson*		Powers Field at Princeton Stadium; Princeton, NJ		W 63–0	4,429
October 2	1:00 p.m.	Columbia		Powers Field at Princeton Stadium; Princeton, NJ		W 24–7	5,926
October 9	1:00 p.m.	at Monmouth*		Kessler Stadium; West Long Branch, NJ	ESPN+	W 31–28	2,977
October 16	12:30 p.m.	at Brown	No. 25	Richard Gouse Field at Brown Stadium; Providence, RI	ESPN+	W 56–42	4,880
October 23	1:00 p.m.	Harvard	No. 22	Powers Field at Princeton Stadium; Princeton, NJ (rivalry)	ESPN+	W 18–16 ^{5OT}	10,033
October 29	7:00 p.m.	at Cornell	No. 19	Schoellkopf Field; Ithaca, NY	ESPNU	W 34–16	1,542
November 5	6:00 p.m.	at Dartmouth	No. 20т	Memorial Field; Hanover, NH	ESPNU	L 7–31	3,834
November 13	1:00 p.m.	Yale		Powers Field at Princeton Stadium; Princeton, NJ	ESPN+	W 35-20	7,686
November 20	1:00 p.m.	at Penn	No. 24	Franklin Field; Philadelphia, PA	ESPN+	W 34–14	3,975
*Non-conference game; Rankings from STATS Poll released prior to the game; All times are in Eastern time
