= Frank Giufre =

American football player and coach (born 1977)

Current position
- Title: Offensive line coach
- Team: Fordham
- Conference: Patriot

Biographical details
- Born: April 5, 1977 (age 49); Canastota, New York, U.S.

Playing career
- 1995–1999: Syracuse
- Positions: Guard, center

Coaching career (HC unless noted)
- 2000: Christian Brothers Academy (NY) (OL)
- 2001–2003: Miami (FL) (GA)
- 2004–2006: Sacred Heart (OL)
- 2007–2011: Maine (RGC/OL)
- 2012: Indianapolis Colts (assistant TE)
- 2013–2017: Indianapolis Colts (assistant OL)
- 2017–2018: UConn (OL)
- 2019–2021: UConn (OC/OL)
- 2023–present: Fordham (OL)

Frank A. Giufre (born April 5, 1977) is an American football coach. He is the offensive line coach at Fordham University, a position he has held since 2023. Giufre served as the offensive coordinator at the University of Connecticut from 2019 to 2021.

== Coaching career ==
=== UConn ===
Giufre was hired as UConn's offensive line coach in 2017 after spending the previous six seasons with the Indianapolis Colts of the National Football League (NFL). In February 2019, Giufre was promoted to offensive coordinator.
