= Keelan Marion =

American football player (born 2000)

Columbus Aviators
- Positions: Wide receiver, return specialist
- Roster status: Unsigned draft pick

Personal information
- Listed height: 6 ft 0 in (1.83 m)
- Listed weight: 195 lb (88 kg)

Career information
- High school: Grayson (Loganville, Georgia)
- College: UConn (2021–2022); BYU (2023–2024); Miami (FL) (2025)
- NFL draft: 2026: undrafted

Career history
- Atlanta Falcons (2026)*; Columbus Aviators (2027-present)
- * Offseason or practice squad member only

Awards and highlights
- First-team All-American (2024); Second-team All-Big 12 (2024)

Keelan Marion is an American professional football wide receiver and return specialist. He played college football for the UConn Huskies, the BYU Cougars and the Miami Hurricanes. He was signed as an undrafted free agent by the Falcons in 2026.

== Early life ==
Marion attended Grayson High School in Loganville, Georgia. He was rated as a two-star recruit and committed to play college football for the UConn Huskies.

== College career ==
=== UConn ===
As a freshman in 2021, Marion started all 12 games for the Huskies and totaled 28 receptions for 474 yards and five touchdowns. In 2022, he appeared in just five games after suffering a broken collarbone, finishing the year with four receptions for 89 yards and a touchdown. After the season, Marion entered his name into the NCAA transfer portal.

=== BYU ===
Marion transferred to play for the BYU Cougars. In his first season with the Cougars in 2023, he notched 20 receptions for 216 yards and added three rushing touchdowns and 19 kick returns for 393 yards. In week 3 of the 2024 season, Marion returned a kickoff 100 yards for a touchdown in a win over Wyoming. In week 11, he returned a kickoff 96 yards for a touchdown versus in-state rivals Utah. For his performance on the season, Marion was named second-team all-Big 12 Conference and first-team all-American.

== Professional career ==
Pre-draft measurables
Height	Weight	Arm length	Hand span	Wingspan	40-yard dash	10-yard split	20-yard split	20-yard shuttle	Three-cone drill	Broad jump	Bench press
5 ft 11 5/8 in (1.82 m)	190 lb (86 kg)	30 7/8 in (0.78 m)	8 5/8 in (0.22 m)	6 ft 2 1/2 in (1.89 m)	4.56 s	1.62 s	2.67 s	4.19 s	6.97 s	9 ft 6 in (2.90 m)	6 reps
All values from Pro Day

Marion was signed as an undrafted free agent by the Atlanta Falcons after the 2026 NFL draft. He was waived by the Falcons as a part of final roster cuts on August 29.
