= 2021 LIU Sharks football team =

American college football season

2021 LIU Sharks football
- Conference: Northeast Conference
- Record: 2–8 (2–5 NEC)
- Head coach: Jonathan Gill (interim season)
- Offensive coordinator: Jim Cordle (2nd season)
- Defensive coordinator: Rich Reichert (2nd season)
- Home stadium: Bethpage Federal Credit Union Stadium

2021 Northeast Conference football standings
	Conf.			Overall
Team	W		L	W		L
Sacred Heart $^	6	–	1	8	–	4
Duquesne	5	–	2	7	–	3
Bryant	5	–	2	7	–	4
Central Connecticut	4	–	3	4	–	7
Saint Francis (PA)	4	–	3	5	–	6
Merrimack *	2	–	5	5	–	6
LIU	2	–	5	2	–	8
Wagner	0	–	7	0	–	11
$ – Conference champion; ^ – FCS playoff participant; Note: Merrimack ineligible for NEC title and FCS postseason play due to transition from NCAA Division II

The 2021 LIU Sharks football team represented both the LIU Post and LIU Brooklyn campuses of Long Island University as a member of the Northeast Conference (NEC) in the 2021 NCAA Division I FCS football season. The Sharks, led by interim head coach Jonathan Gill, played their home games at Bethpage Federal Credit Union Stadium.

== Schedule ==
Date	Time	Opponent	Site	TV	Result	Attendance
September 2	8:00 p.m.	at FIU*	Riccardo Silva Stadium; Miami, FL	ESPN3	L 10–48	0
September 11	5:00 p.m.	at West Virginia*	Milan Puskar Stadium; Morgantown, WV	ESPN+	L 0–66	50,911
September 18	3:30 p.m.	at Miami (OH)*	Yager Stadium; Oxford, OH	ESPN+	L 7–42	12,036
October 9	1:00 p.m.	at Saint Francis (PA)	DeGol Field; Loretto, PA	NEC Front Row	L 10–55	1,464
October 16	12:00 p.m.	Merrimack	Bethpage Federal Credit Union Stadium; Brookville, NY	ESPN3	L 5–43	1,149
October 23	12:00 p.m.	at Central Connecticut	Arute Field; New Britain, CT	NEC Front Row	W 30–13	2,114
October 30	1:00 p.m.	Wagner	Bethpage Federal Credit Union Stadium; Brookville, NY	NEC Front Row	W 28–14	655
November 6	12:00 p.m.	Duquesne	Bethpage Federal Credit Union Stadium; Brookville, NY	NEC Front Row	L 28–34	874
November 13	1:00 p.m.	at Bryant	Beirne Stadium; Smithfield, RI	NEC Front Row	L 7–52	3,300
November 20	12:00 p.m.	Sacred Heart	Bethpage Federal Credit Union Stadium; Brookville, NY	ESPN3	L 14–38	1,092
*Non-conference game; All times are in Eastern time

== Game summaries ==
=== at FIU ===
LIU Sharks at FIU Panthers – Game summary

Quarter	1	2	3	4	Total
Sharks	0	10	0	0	10
Panthers	21	7	10	10	48

at Riccardo Silva Stadium, Miami, Florida

- Date: September 2
- Game time: 8:00 p.m. EDT
- Game weather: Rain, 75 °F (24 °C)
- Game attendance: 0
- Referee: Jon Noil
- TV announcers (ESPN3): A. J. Ricketts and Cam Lynch
- Box score, Recap

Game information

First quarter

- FIU – D'vonte Price 8-yard run (Chase Gabriel kick), 13:55. Panthers 7–0. Drive: 3 plays, 69 yards, 1:05.
- FIU – D'vonte Price 68-yard run (Chase Gabriel kick), 4:52. Panthers 14–0. Drive: 2 plays, 80 yards, 0:28.
- FIU – Shaun Peterson Jr. 4-yard run (Chase Gabriel kick), 1:56. Panthers 21–0. Drive: 3 plays, 61 yards, 1:14.

Second quarter

- FIU – D'vonte Price 28-yard run (Chase Gabriel kick), 5:47. Panthers 28–0. Drive: 3 plays, 85 yards, 1:16.
- LIU – Derick Eugene 74-yard pass from Camden Orth (Paul Inzerillo kick), 3:59. Panthers 28–7. Drive: 3 plays, 74 yards, 1:40.
- LIU – Paul Inzerillo 29-yard field goal, 0:06. Panthers 28–10. Drive: 7 plays, 42 yards, 2:14.

Third quarter

- FIU – Bryce Singleton 52-yard pass from Max Bortenschlager (Chase Gabriel kick), 10:01. Panthers 35–10. Drive: 5 plays, 66 yards, 2:02.
- FIU – Chase Gabriel 29-yard field goal, 4:26. Panthers 38–10. Drive: 7 plays, 44 yards, 2:31.

Fourth quarter

- FIU – Tyrese Chambers 12-yard pass from Max Bortenschlager (Chase Gabriel kick), 11:06. Panthers 45–10. Drive: 8 plays, 73 yards, 3:34.
- FIU – Chase Gabriel 45-yard field goal, 7:33. Panthers 48–10. Drive: 5 plays, 13 yards, 1:50.

Top passers

- LIU – Camden Orth – 15/30, 197 yards, TD
- FIU – Max Bortenschlager – 14/17, 266 yards, 2 TD, INT

Top rushers

- LIU – Jonathan DeBique – 7 rushes, 34 yards
- FIU – D'Vonte Price – 5 rushes, 165 yards, 3 TD

Top receivers

- LIU – Derick Eugene – 7 receptions, 115 yards, TD
- FIU – Bryce Singleton – 6 receptions, 149 yards, TD

=== at West Virginia ===
LIU Sharks (0–1) vs. West Virginia Mountaineers (0–1)

Quarter	1	2	3	4	Total
LIU	0	0	0	0	0
West Virginia	21	17	21	7	66

at Mountaineer Field • Morgantown, WV

- Date: Saturday, September 11, 2021
- Game time: 5:00 p.m. EDT
- Game weather: sunny • Temperature: 73°F
- Game attendance: 50,911
- Referee: Scott Campbell
- TV announcers (ESPN+): Bill Spaulding, Barrett Brooks

Game information

First Quarter

- (14:49) WVU – Winston Wright Jr. 90 yard Kickoff Return, Casey Legg kick (Drive: 1 plays, 90 yards, 0:11; WVU 7–0)
- (6:16) WVU – Leddie Brown 1 yard run, Casey Legg kick (Drive: 14 plays, 80 yards, 5:09; WVU 14-0)
- (7:57) WVU – Leddie Brown 2 yard run, Casey Legg kick (Drive: 6 plays, 39 yards, 2:07; WVU 21-0)

Second Quarter

- (8:58) WVU – Garrett Greene 3 yard run, Casey Legg kick (Drive: 13 plays, 69 yards, 5:12; WVU 28–0)
- (3:07) WVU – Sam James 18 yard pass from Jarret Doege, Casey Legg kick (Drive: 11 plays, 56 yards, 3:46; WVU 35–0)
- (0:00) WVU – Casey Legg 44 yard field goal (Drive: 7 plays, 53 yards, 0:32; WVU 38-0)

Third Quarter

- (12:34) WVU – Sean Ryan 39 yard pass from Jarret Doege, Casey Legg kick (Drive: 3 plays, 49 yards, 1:18; WVU 45-0)
- (11:16) WVU – Sam James 15 yard pass from Jarret Doege, Casey Legg kick (Drive: 3 plays, 26 yards, 0:44; WVU 52-0)
- (5:59) WVU – Garrett Greene 13 yard run, Evan Staley kick (Drive: 7 plays, 54 yards, 3:05; WVU 59-0)

Fourth Quarter

- (5:25) WVU – A'Varius Sparrow 1 yard run, Evan Staley kick (Drive: 3 plays, 29 yards, 1:18; WVU 66-0)

Statistics	LIU	WVU
First downs	9	29
Total yards	95	542
Rushes/yards	35/31	55/198
Passing yards	60	344
Passing: Comp–Att–Int	11–21–0	20–32–0
Time of possession	24:53	35:07

Team	Category	Player	Statistics
Long Island	Passing	Camden Orth	11–20, 60 yards
Long Island	Rushing	Jonathan DeBique	8 carries, 23 yards
Long Island	Receiving	Steven Chambers	2 receptions, 18 yards
West Virginia	Passing	Jarret Doege	14–22, 259 yards, 3 TD
West Virginia	Rushing	Garrett Greene	14 carries, 98 yards, 2 TD
West Virginia	Receiving	Sean Ryan	3 receptions, 77 yards, 1 TD
