= 2021 North Carolina Central Eagles football team =

American college football season

2021 North Carolina Central Eagles football
- Conference: Mid-Eastern Athletic Conference
- Record: 6–5 (4–1 MEAC)
- Head coach: Trei Oliver (2nd season)
- Offensive coordinator: Matt Leone (1st season)
- Defensive coordinator: Juan Navarro (1st season)
- Home stadium: O'Kelly–Riddick Stadium

2021 Mid-Eastern Athletic Conference football standings
	Conf.			Overall
Team	W		L	W		L
South Carolina State $	5	–	0	7	–	5
North Carolina Central	4	–	1	6	–	5
Delaware State	2	–	3	5	–	6
Norfolk State	2	–	3	6	–	5
Howard	1	–	4	3	–	8
Morgan State	1	–	4	2	–	9
$ – Conference champion

The 2021 North Carolina Central Eagles football team represented North Carolina Central University as a member of the Mid-Eastern Athletic Conference (MEAC) during the 2021 NCAA Division I FCS football season. Led by second-year head coach Trei Oliver, the Eagles compiled an overall record of 6–5 with a mark of 4–1, placing second in the MEAC. North Carolina Central played home games at O'Kelly–Riddick Stadium in Durham, North Carolina.

== Schedule ==
Date	Time	Opponent	Site	TV	Result	Attendance
August 28	7:00 p.m.	Alcorn State*	Center Parc Stadium; Atlanta, GA (MEAC/SWAC Challenge, College GameDay)	ESPN	W 23–14	15,215
September 11	6:30 p.m.	at Marshall*	Joan C. Edwards Stadium; Huntington, WV	ESPN+	L 10–44	24,521
September 18	6:00 p.m.	Winston-Salem State*	O'Kelly–Riddick Stadium; Durham, NC	ESPN+	W 20–13	10,918
September 25	6:00 p.m.	at North Carolina A&T*	Truist Stadium; Greensboro, NC	ESPN+	L 14–37	15,009
October 2	4:00 p.m.	at Mississippi Valley State*	Rice–Totten Stadium; Itta Bena, MS	YouTube	L 16–17	3,000
October 9	2:00 p.m.	Tennessee Tech*	O'Kelly–Riddick Stadium; Durham, NC	ESPN+	L 16–27	2,810
October 23	1:00 p.m.	at Morgan State	Hughes Stadium; Baltimore, MD	ESPN+	W 28–17	2,213
October 30	2:00 p.m.	South Carolina State	O'Kelly–Riddick Stadium; Durham, NC	ESPN+	L 24–27	6,828
November 6	2:00 p.m.	Norfolk State	O'Kelly–Riddick Stadium; Durham, NC	ESPN3	W 38–36 ^{2OT}	10,027
November 13	1:00 p.m.	at Howard	William H. Greene Stadium; Washington, DC	ESPN+	W 45–27	4,597
November 20	2:00 p.m.	Delaware State	O'Kelly–Riddick Stadium; Durham, NC	ESPN+	W 34–28	4,525
*Non-conference game; All times are in Eastern time

== Game summaries ==
=== Vs. Alcorn State ===
Alcorn State vs. North Carolina Central

Team	1	2	3	4	Total
Braves	7	0	7	0	14
• Eagles	0	7	6	10	23

- Date: August 28, 2021
- Location: Center Parc Stadium
  Atlanta, GA
- Game start: 6:07 p.m. CDT
- Elapsed time: 3 hours and 27 minutes
- Game attendance: 15,215
- Game weather: • Weather: TBD • Wind: TBD
- Referee: Bobby Wright
- TV announcers (ESPN): Mark Jones (play–by–play), Jay Walker (analyst), Robert Griffin III (analyst), Quint Kessenich (sideline reporter)

Scoring summary
1	10:25	ALCN	Juan Anthony Jr. 20-yard pass from Felix Harper (Cristofer Thompson kick) (10 plays, 65 yards, 4:35)	ALCN 7–0
2	00:23	NCCU	Davius Richard 6-yard rush (Adrian Olivo kick) (8 plays, 57 yards, 2:42)	TIE 7–7
3	10:25	NCCU	Davius Richard 1-yard rush (Adrian Olivo PAT blocked) (9 plays, 75 yards, 4:35)	NCCU 13–7
3	02:19	ALCN	Niko Duffey 4-yard pass from Felix Harper (Cristofer Thompson kick) (6 plays, 28 yards, 2:38)	ALCN 14–13
4	13:39	NCCU	Adrian Olivo 28-yard field goal (8 plays, 64 yards, 3:40)	NCCU 16–14
4	11:21	NCCU	Brandon Codrington 77-yard punt return (Adrian Olivo kick) (5 plays, 8 yards, 2:18)	NCCU 23–14

Statistics	Alcorn State	North Carolina Central
First downs	18	19
Total yards	325	391
Rushing yards	171	207
Passing yards	154	184
Turnovers	1	2
Time of possession	28:20	31:25

Team	Category	Player	Statistics
Alcorn State	Passing	Felix Harper	17/27, 154 yards, 2 TDs
Alcorn State	Rushing	Stadford Anderson	11 carries, 128 yards
Alcorn State	Receiving	Juan Anthony Jr.	5 receptions, 66 yards, 1 TD
North Carolina Central	Passing	Davius Richard	16/26, 184 yards, 1 INT
North Carolina Central	Rushing	Jordan Freeman	9 carries, 72 yards
North Carolina Central	Receiving	Ryan McDaniel	6 receptions, 72 yards

=== At Marshall ===
Game Two – North Carolina Central Eagles (1–0) at Marshall Thundering Herd (1–0)

Quarter	1	2	3	4	Total
Eagles	0	7	0	3	10
Thundering Herd	6	24	7	7	44

at Joan C. Edwards Stadium • Huntington, West Virginia

- Date: Saturday, September 11, 2021
- Game time: 6:30 p.m. EDT
- Game weather: Sunny • Temperature: 81 °F (27 °C) • Wind: None
- Game attendance: 24,521
- Referee: Patrick Foy
- TV announcers (ESPN+): Jake Griffith (play-by-play), Dave Wilson (analyst)

Game information

First quarter

- (9:19) MRSH – Grant Wells 10 yard rush, Grant Wells pass failed (Drive: 9 plays, 58 yards, 2:08; Marshall 6–0)

Second quarter

- (14:05) MRSH – Talik Keaton 14 yard pass from Grant Wells, Andrew Sanders kick (Drive: 14 plays, 75 yards, 4:14; Marshall 13–0)
- (8:57) MRSH – Rasheen Ali 3 yard pass from Grant Wells, Andrew Sanders kick (Drive: 11 plays, 61 yards, 3:46; Marshall 20–0)
- (3:23) NCCU – Mookie Collier 4 yard pass from Davius Richard, Adrian Olivio kick (Drive: 3 plays, 10 yards, 1:36; Marshall 20–7)
- (2:04) MRSH – Talik Keaton 46 yard pass from Grant Wells, Andrew Sanders kick (Drive: 5 plays, 62 yards, 1:19; Marshall 27–7)
- (0:25) MRSH – Andrew Sanders 27 yard field goal (Drive: 5 plays, 19 yards, 0:51; Marshall 30–7)

Third quarter

- (4:40) MRSH – Knowledge McDaniel 3 yard rush, Andrew Sanders kick (Drive: 10 plays, 90 yards, 3:02; Marshall 37–7)

Fourth quarter

- (7:28) MRSH – Ethan Payne 8 yard rush, Shane Ciucci kick (Drive: 13 plays, 99 yards, 4:57; Marshall 44–7)
- (0:53) NCCU – Adrian Olivio 21 yard field goal (Drive: 14 plays, 71 yards, 6:35; Marshall 44–10)

Statistics	NCCU	MRSH
First downs	9	38
Plays–yards	60–177	100–700
Rushes–yards	28–71	42–237
Passing yards	106	463
Passing: comp–att–int	14–32–0	42–58–2
Time of possession	27:24	32:36

Team	Category	Player	Statistics
NC Central	Passing	Davius Richard	14/32, 106 yards, 1 TD
NC Central	Rushing	Jamal Currie-Elliott	9 carries, 34 yards
NC Central	Receiving	Tyler Barnes	3 receptions, 40 yards
Marshall	Passing	Grant Wells	34/47, 347 yards, 3 TD, 1 INT
Marshall	Rushing	Knowledge McDaniel	7 carries, 67 yards, 1 TD
Marshall	Receiving	Jayden Harrison	4 receptions, 81 yards
