= 2021 Merrimack Warriors football team =

American college football season

2021 Merrimack Warriors football
- Conference: Northeast Conference
- Record: 5–6 (2–5 NEC)
- Head coach: Dan Curran (9th season)
- Defensive coordinator: Mike Gennetti (17th season)
- Home stadium: Duane Stadium

2021 Northeast Conference football standings
	Conf.			Overall
Team	W		L	W		L
Sacred Heart $^	6	–	1	8	–	4
Duquesne	5	–	2	7	–	3
Bryant	5	–	2	7	–	4
Central Connecticut	4	–	3	4	–	7
Saint Francis (PA)	4	–	3	5	–	6
Merrimack *	2	–	5	5	–	6
LIU	2	–	5	2	–	8
Wagner	0	–	7	0	–	11
$ – Conference champion; ^ – FCS playoff participant; Note: Merrimack ineligible for NEC title and FCS postseason play due to transition from NCAA Division II

The 2021 Merrimack Warriors football team represented Merrimack College as a member of the Northeast Conference (NEC) in the 2021 NCAA Division I FCS football season. The Warriors, led by ninth-year head coach Dan Curran, played their home games at Duane Stadium.

== Schedule ==
Date	Time	Opponent	Site	TV	Result	Attendance
September 4	1:00 p.m.	Saint Anselm *	Duane Stadium; North Andover, MA		W 55–23	3,827
September 11	2:00 p.m.	at No. 24 Holy Cross*	Fitton Field; Worcester, MA	ESPN+	W 35–21	8,211
September 18	12:00 p.m.	at Maine*	Alfond Stadium; Orono, ME	ESPN+	L 26–31	5,041
September 25	2:00 p.m.	at Delaware State*	Alumni Stadium; Dover, DE		W 47–10	1,843
October 2	1:00 p.m.	Duquesne	Duane Stadium; North Andover, MA		L 14–37	12,147
October 9	2:00 p.m.	at Sacred Heart	Campus Field; Fairfield, CT		L 10–20	4,993
October 16	12:00 p.m.	at LIU	Bethpage Federal Credit Union Stadium; Brookville, NY		W 43–5	1,149
October 30	1:00 p.m.	Central Connecticut	Duane Stadium; North Andover, MA		L 21–49	1,148
November 6	12:00 p.m.	at Wagner	Wagner College Stadium; Staten Island, NY		W 35–26	1,607
November 13	12:00 p.m.	at Saint Francis (PA)	DeGol Field; Loretto, PA		L 6–22	834
November 20	1:00 p.m.	Bryant	Duane Stadium; North Andover, MA		L 14–58	2,318
*Non-conference game; Rankings from STATS Poll released prior to the game; All times are in Eastern time
