= 2021 South Carolina State Bulldogs football team =

American college football season

2021 South Carolina State Bulldogs football

Black college national champion MEAC champion Celebration Bowl champion

Celebration Bowl, W 31–10 vs. Jackson State
- Conference: Mid-Eastern Athletic Conference
- Record: 7–5 (5–0 MEAC)
- Head coach: Oliver Pough (20th season)
- Offensive coordinator: Bennett Swygert (5th season)
- Defensive coordinator: Jonathan Saxon (3rd as DC, 7th overall season)
- Home stadium: Oliver C. Dawson Stadium

2021 Mid-Eastern Athletic Conference football standings
	Conf.			Overall
Team	W		L	W		L
South Carolina State $	5	–	0	7	–	5
North Carolina Central	4	–	1	6	–	5
Delaware State	2	–	3	5	–	6
Norfolk State	2	–	3	6	–	5
Howard	1	–	4	3	–	8
Morgan State	1	–	4	2	–	9
$ – Conference champion

The 2021 South Carolina State Bulldogs football team represented South Carolina State University as a member of the Mid-Eastern Athletic Conference (MEAC) in the 2021 NCAA Division I FCS football season. The Bulldogs, led by 20th-year head coach Oliver Pough, played their home games at Oliver C. Dawson Stadium.

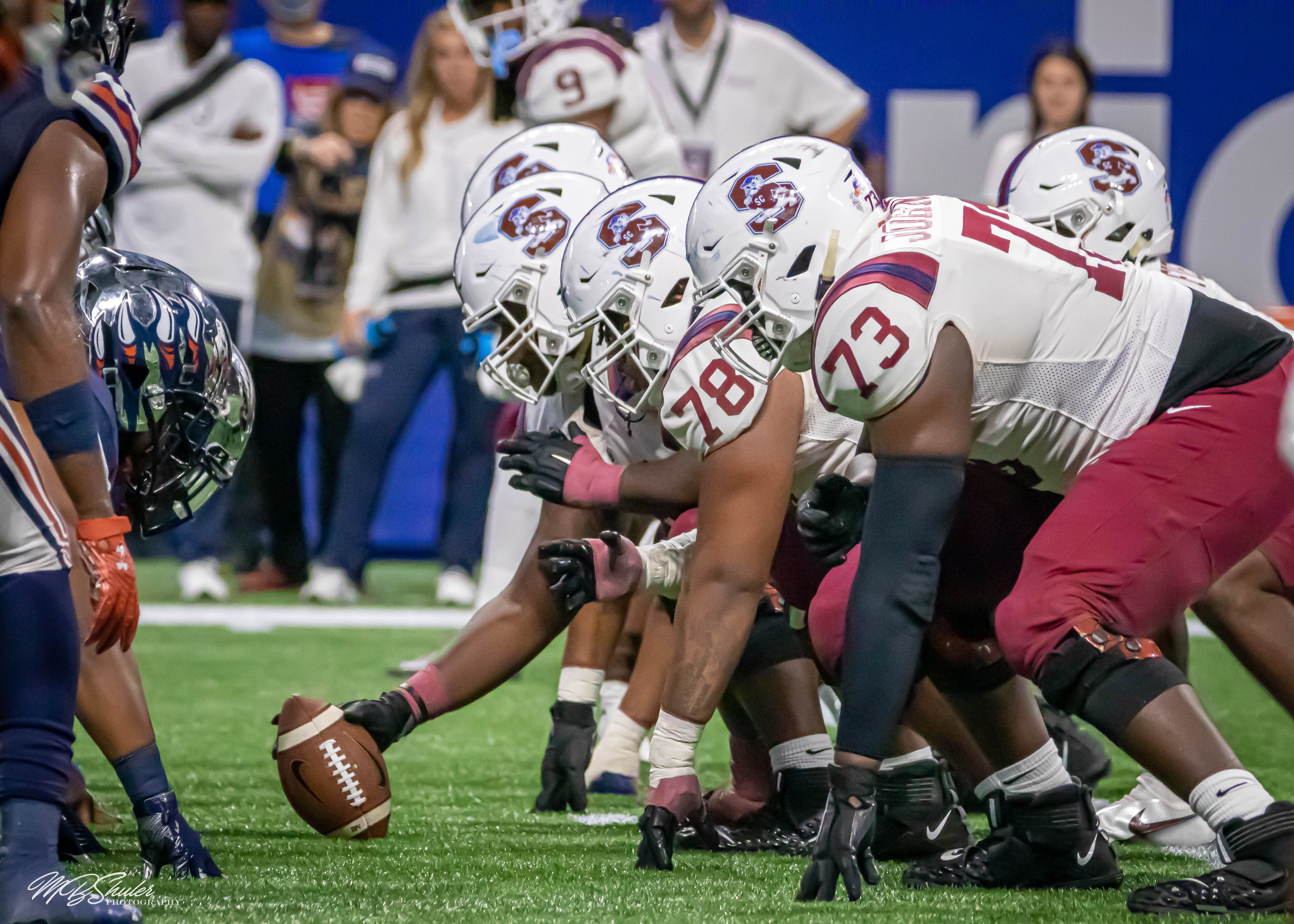
2021 Celebration Bowl

On November 13, the Bulldogs clinched a berth in the Celebration Bowl; the team completed their season with a 7–5 record and a 5–0 record in conference play. The Bulldogs upset the SWAC champions No. 15 Jackson State 31–10 in the Celebration Bowl, their first postseason win since the December 1994 Heritage Bowl.

== Schedule ==
Date	Time	Opponent	Site	TV	Result	Attendance
September 4	6:00 p.m.	at Alabama A&M*	Louis Crews Stadium; Normal, AL	YouTube	L 41–42	11,500
September 11	5:00 p.m.	at No. 6 (FBS) Clemson*	Memorial Stadium; Clemson, SC	ACCN	L 3–49	78,609
September 18	8:00 p.m.	at New Mexico State*	Aggie Memorial Stadium; Las Cruces, NM		L 35–43	11,823
October 2	1:30 p.m.	Bethune–Cookman*	Oliver C. Dawson Stadium; Orangeburg, SC	ESPN+	W 42–35	6,153
October 9	6:00 p.m.	at Florida A&M*	Bragg Memorial Stadium; Tallahassee, FL	Facebook	L 7–30	14,892
October 16	1:30 p.m.	Morgan State	Oliver C. Dawson Stadium; Orangeburg, SC	ESPN3	W 37–14	11,000
October 23	2:00 p.m.	at Delaware State	Alumni Stadium; Dover, DE	ESPN3	W 13–7	3,227
October 30	2:00 p.m.	at North Carolina Central	O'Kelly–Riddick Stadium; Durham, NC	ESPN+	W 27–24	6,828
November 6	2:00 p.m.	Howard	Oliver C. Dawson Stadium; Orangeburg, SC	ESPN+	W 15–12	6,500
November 13	1:30 p.m.	North Carolina A&T*	Oliver C. Dawson Stadium; Orangeburg, SC (Rivalry)	ESPN+	L 17–27	9,169
November 20	2:00 p.m.	at Norfolk State	William "Dick" Price Stadium; Norfolk, VA	ESPN3	W 31–21	3,021
December 18	12:00 p.m.	vs. No. 15 Jackson State	Mercedes-Benz Stadium; Atlanta, GA (Celebration Bowl)	ABC	W 31–10	48,653
*Non-conference game; Rankings from STATS Poll released prior to the game; All times are in Eastern time

== Photos ==
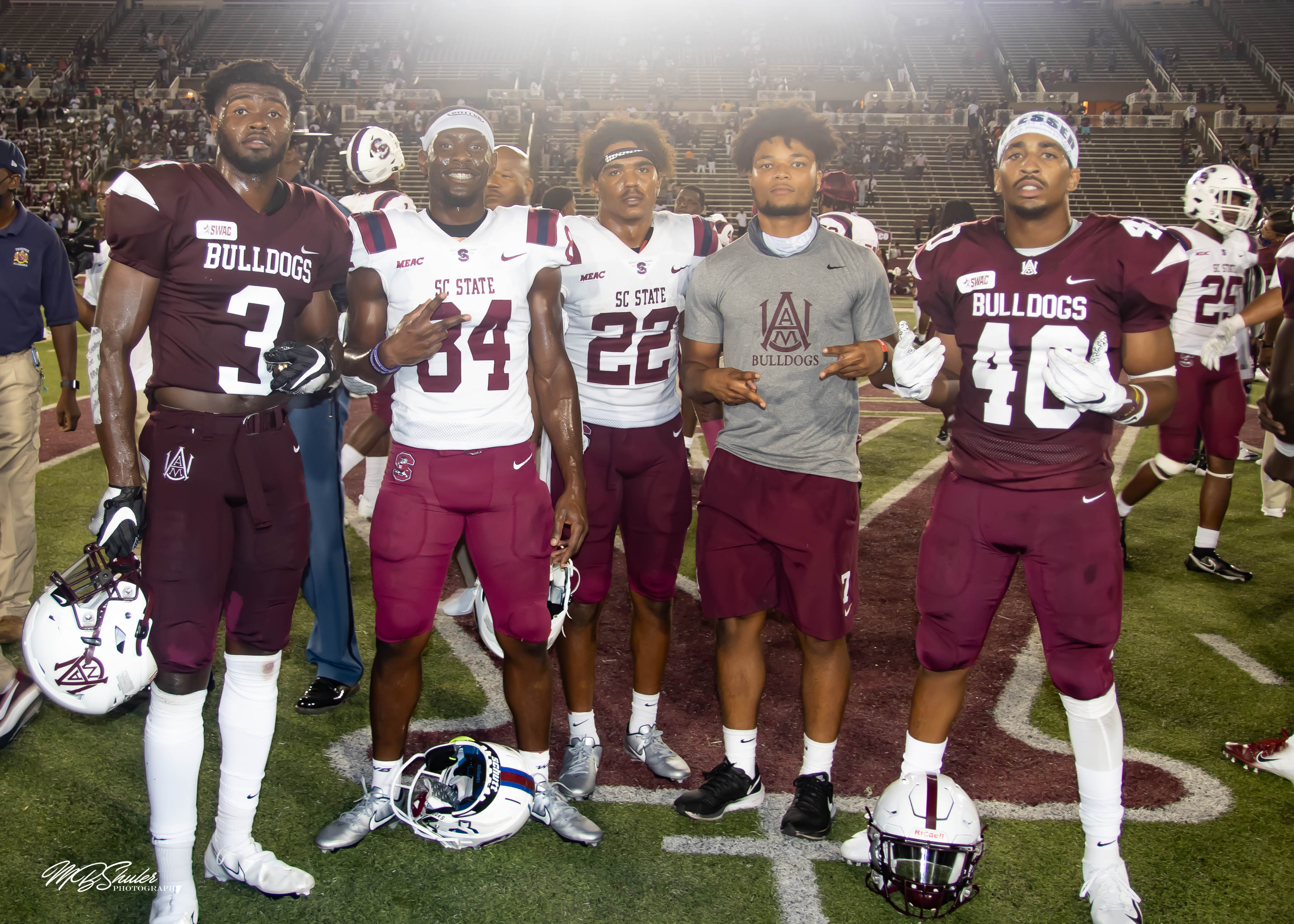
at Alabama A&M

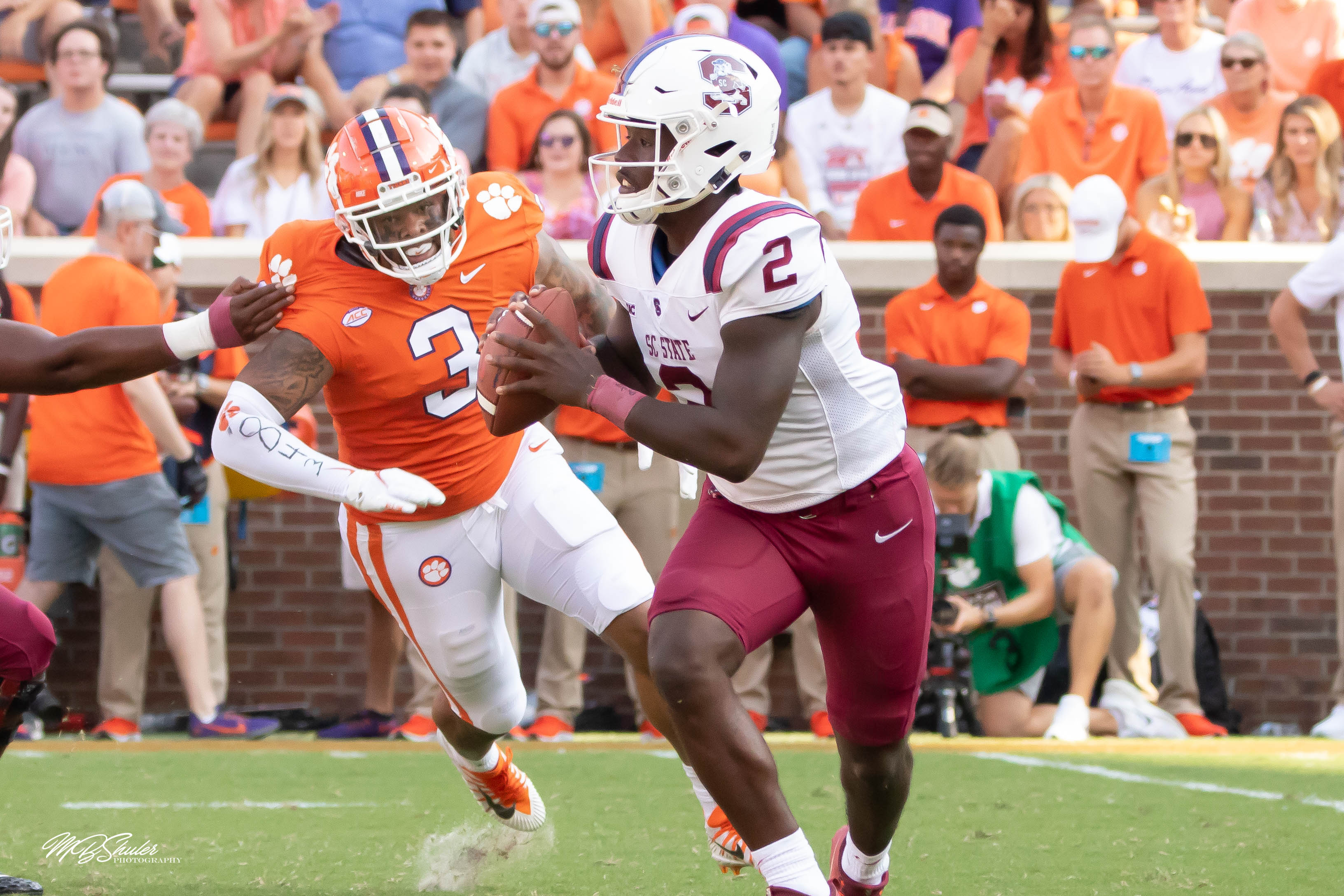
at Clemson

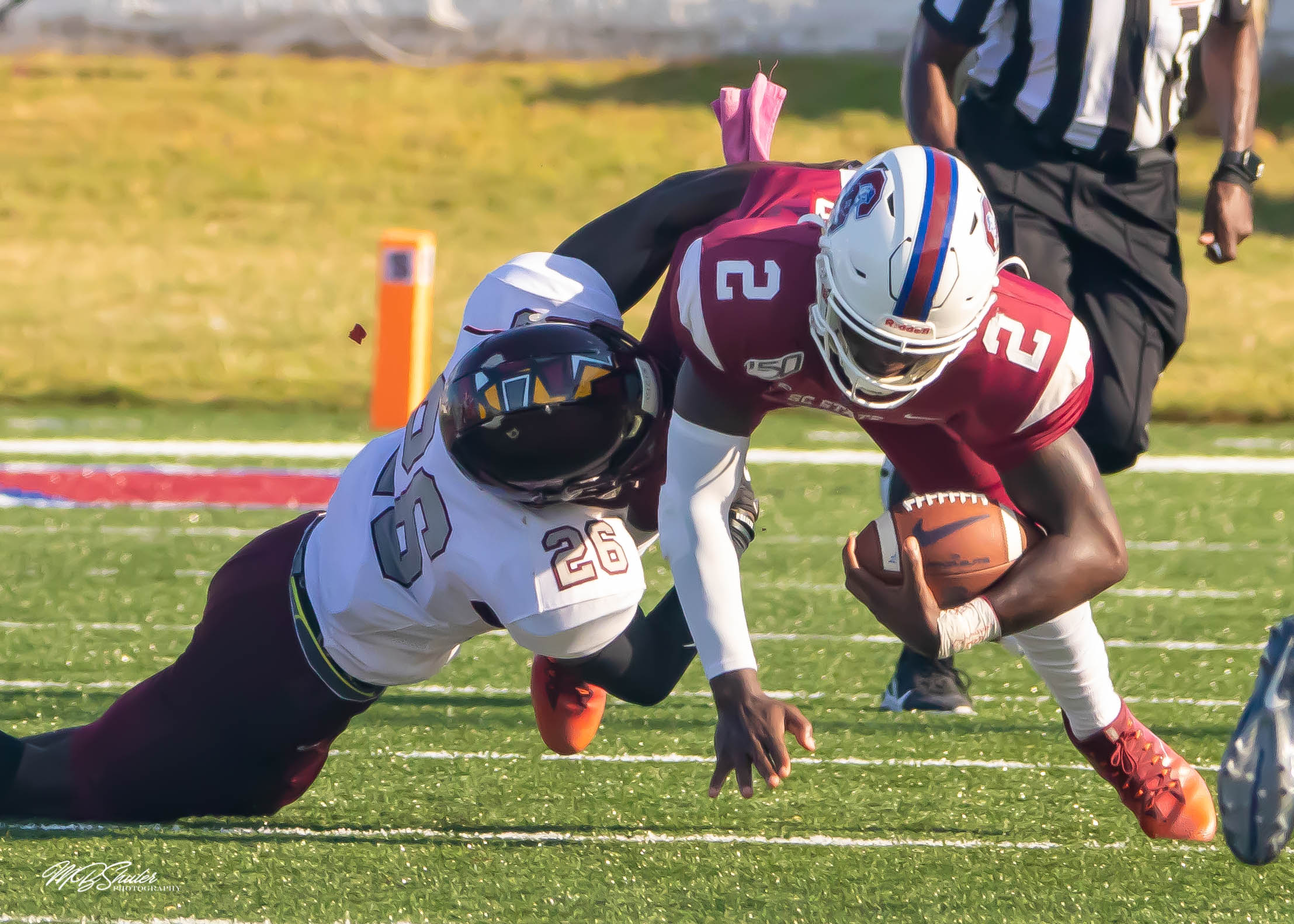
Bethune Cookman

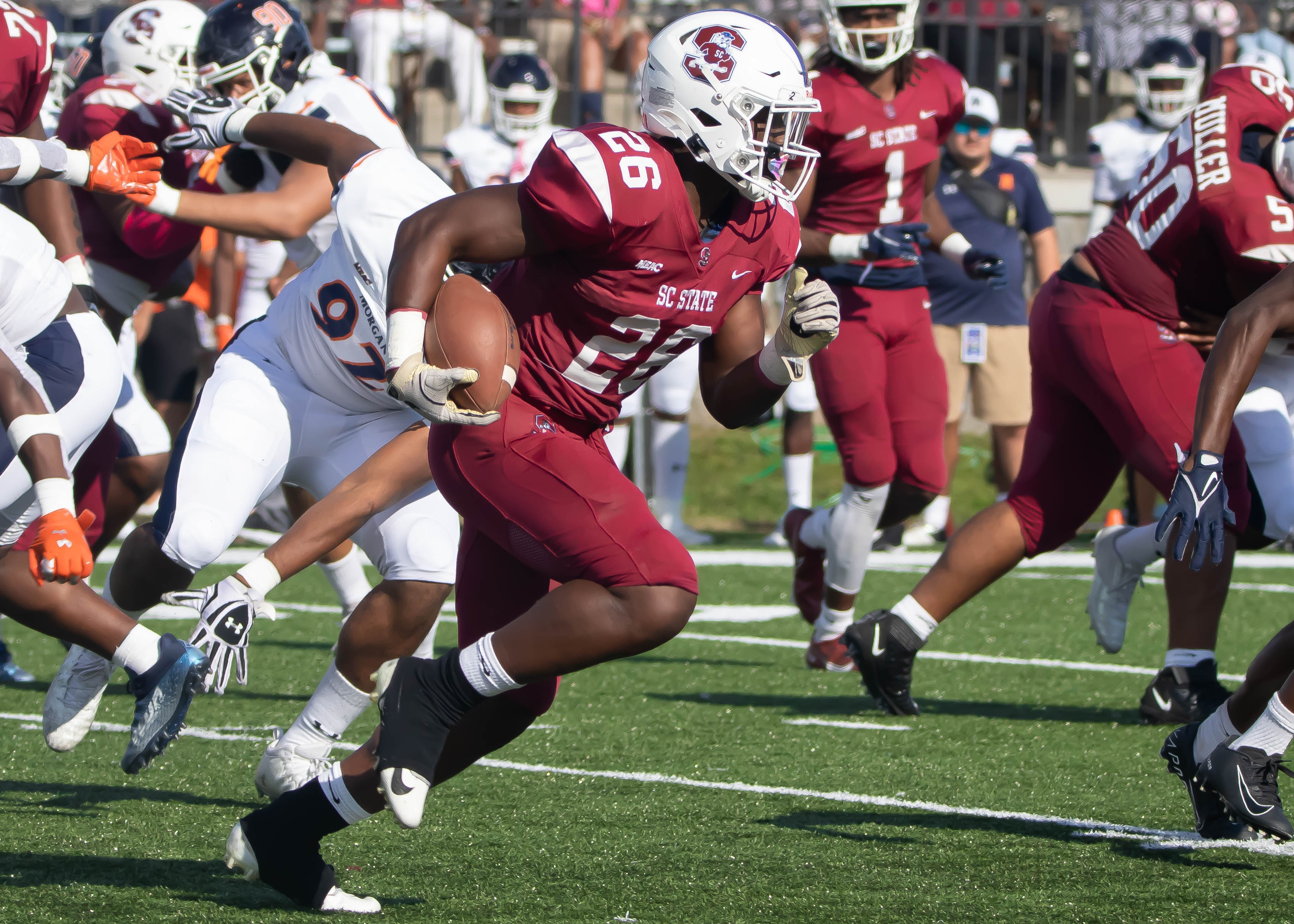
Morgan State

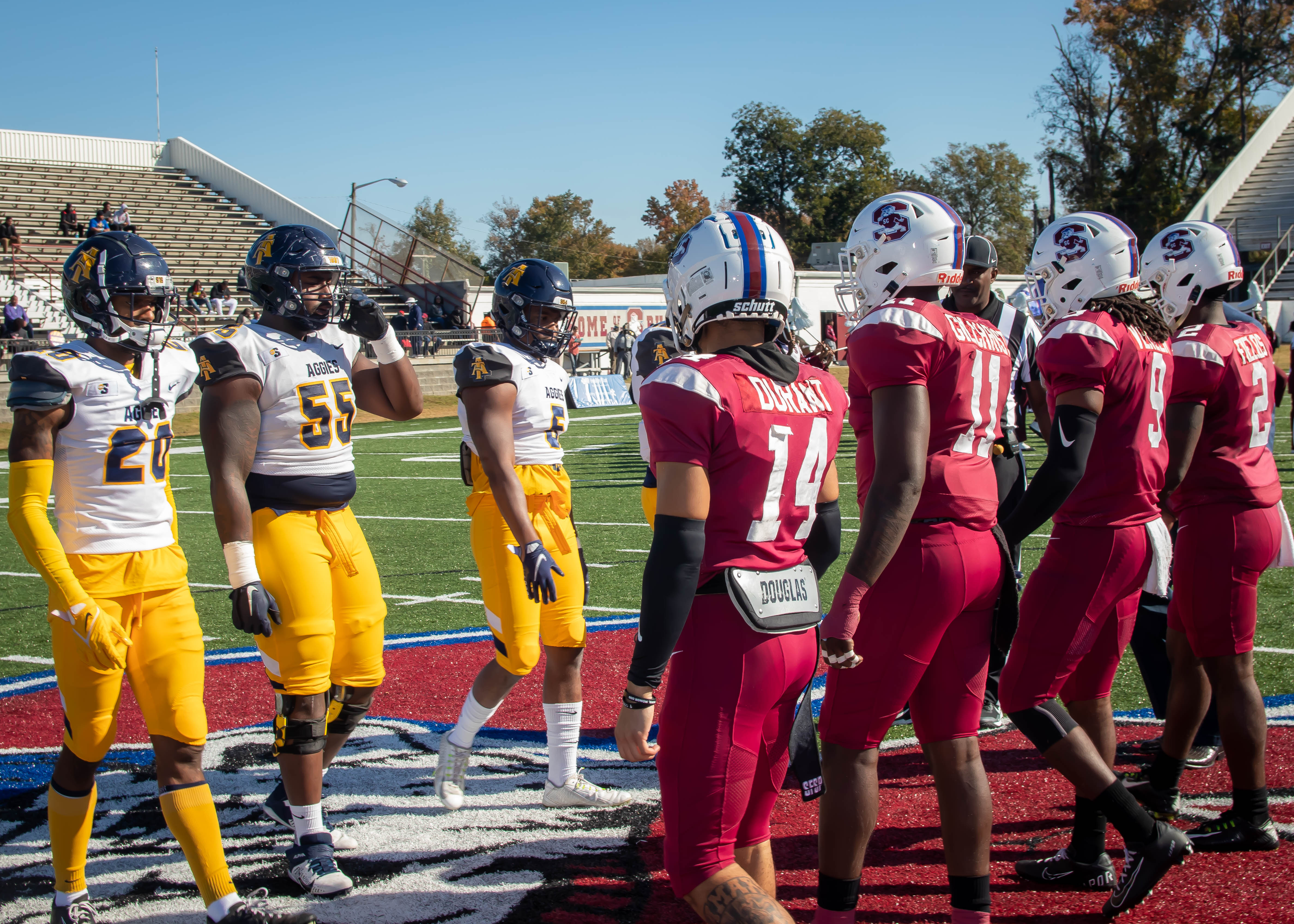
NC A&T

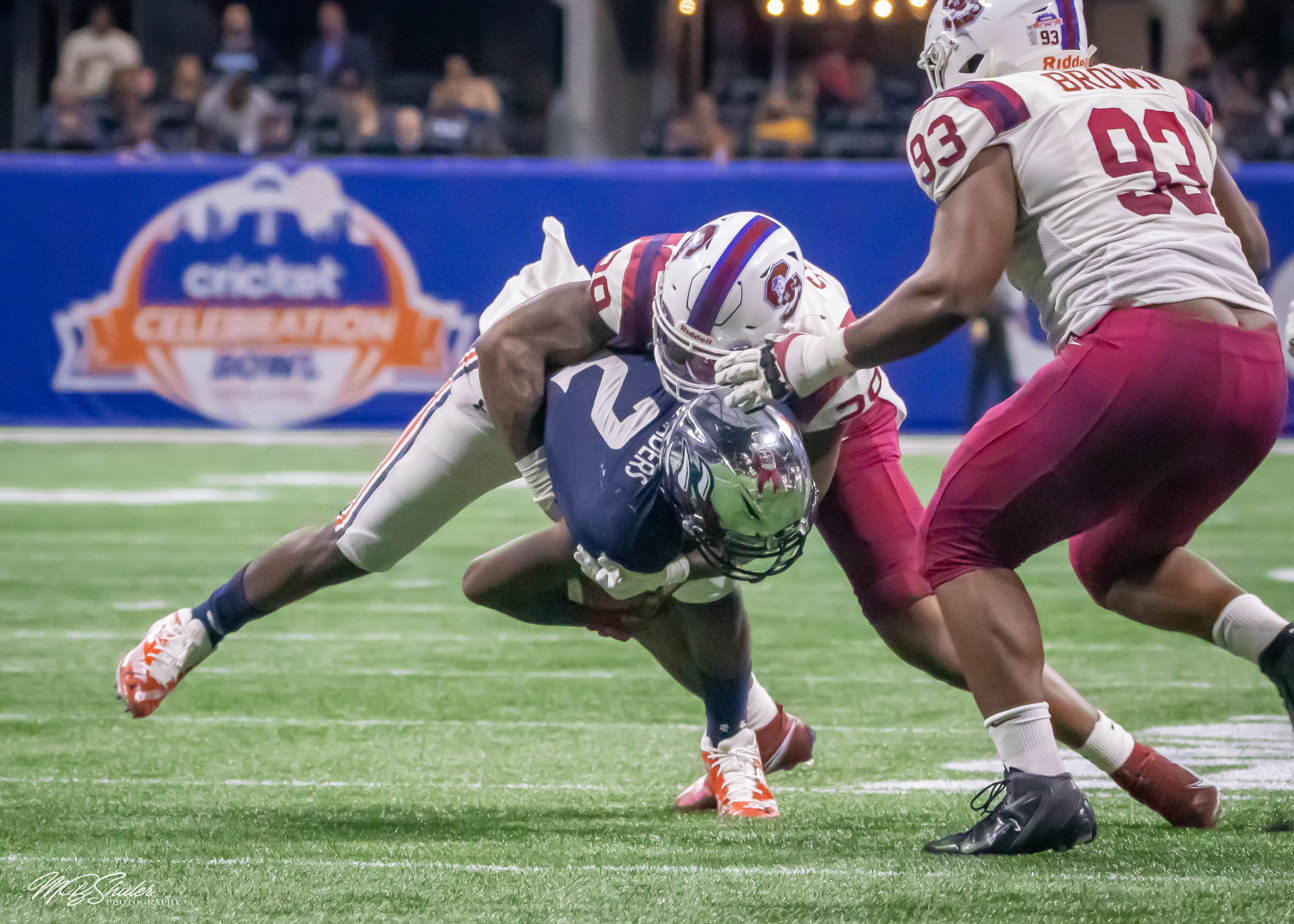
Celebration Bowl
