= 2017 Sacred Heart Pioneers football team =

American college football season

2017 Sacred Heart Pioneers football
- Conference: Northeast Conference
- Record: 4–7 (2–4 NEC)
- Head coach: Mark Nofri (6th season)
- Offensive coordinator: Matt Gardner (1st season)
- Defensive coordinator: Michael Cooke (1st season)
- Home stadium: Campus Field

2017 Northeast Conference football standings
	Conf.			Overall
Team	W		L	W		L
Central Connecticut $^	6	–	0	8	–	3
Duquesne	4	–	2	7	–	4
Bryant	4	–	2	6	–	5
Saint Francis (PA)	3	–	3	5	–	6
Sacred Heart	2	–	4	4	–	7
Wagner	2	–	4	4	–	7
Robert Morris	0	–	6	2	–	9
$ – Conference champion; ^ – FCS playoff participant

The 2017 Sacred Heart Pioneers football team represented Sacred Heart University as a member of the Northeast Conference (NEC) during the 2017 NCAA Division I FCS football season. Led by sixth-year head coach Mark Nofri, the Pioneers compiled an overall record of 4–7 with a mark of 2–4 in conference play, tying for fifth place in the NEC. Sacred Heart played home games at Campus Field in Fairfield, Connecticut.

== Schedule ==
Date	Time	Opponent	Site	TV	Result	Attendance
September 2	6:00 p.m.	Stetson*	Campus Field; Fairfield, CT	NECFR	W 42–3	2,992
September 9	6:00 p.m.	at Lafayette*	Fisher Stadium; Easton, PA	STADIUM	W 38–24	4,923
September 16	6:00 p.m.	at Stony Brook*	Kenneth P. LaValle Stadium; Stony Brook, NY	Wolfievision	L 7–45	8,102
September 23	6:00 p.m.	at Bucknell*	Christy Mathewson–Memorial Stadium; Lewisburg, PA	STADIUM	L 31–34	4,345
September 30	5:00 p.m.	Central Connecticut^{†}	Campus Field; Fairfield, CT	ESPN3	L 15–26	3,063
October 14	1:00 p.m.	Dartmouth*	Campus Field; Fairfield, CT	NECFR	L 26–29	5,569
October 21	Noon	at Robert Morris	Joe Walton Stadium; Moon Township, PA	NECFR	W 21–14	1,288
October 28	Noon	Duquesne	Campus Field; Fairfield, CT	NECFR	L 21–37	1,903
November 4	Noon	at Bryant	Beirne Stadium; Smithfield, RI	ESPN3	L 45–48	1,136
November 11	Noon	at Saint Francis (PA)	DeGol Field; Loretto, PA	NECFR	W 16–7	1,262
November 18	Noon	Wagner	Campus Field; Fairfield, CT	NECFR	L 15–28	1,848
*Non-conference game; ^{†}Homecoming; All times are in Eastern time
