= 2021 Sacred Heart Pioneers football team =

American college football season

2021 Sacred Heart Pioneers football

NEC champion

NCAA Division I First Round, L 10–13 at Holy Cross
- Conference: Northeast Conference
- Record: 8–4 (6–1 NEC)
- Head coach: Mark Nofri (10th season)
- Offensive coordinator: Matt Gardner (5th season)
- Defensive coordinator: Mike Cooke (5th season)
- Home stadium: Campus Field

2021 Northeast Conference football standings
	Conf.			Overall
Team	W		L	W		L
Sacred Heart $^	6	–	1	8	–	4
Duquesne	5	–	2	7	–	3
Bryant	5	–	2	7	–	4
Central Connecticut	4	–	3	4	–	7
Saint Francis (PA)	4	–	3	5	–	6
Merrimack *	2	–	5	5	–	6
LIU	2	–	5	2	–	8
Wagner	0	–	7	0	–	11
$ – Conference champion; ^ – FCS playoff participant; Note: Merrimack ineligible for NEC title and FCS postseason play due to transition from NCAA Division II

The 2021 Sacred Heart Pioneers football team represented Sacred Heart University as a member of the Northeast Conference (NEC) in the 2021 NCAA Division I FCS football season. Led by tenth-year head coach Mark Nofri, the Pioneers compiled an overall record of 8–4 with a mark of 6–1 in conference play, winning the NEC title. Sacred Heart earned the conference's automatic bid to the NCAA Division I Football Championship playoffs, losing in the first round to Holy Cross. The team played home games at Campus Field in Fairfield, Connecticut.

== Schedule ==
Date	Time	Opponent	Site	TV	Result	Attendance
September 4	6:00 p.m.	Bucknell*	Campus Field; Fairfield, CT		W 21–0	4,201
September 11	7:00 p.m.	at Bryant	Beirne Stadium; Smithfield, RI		L 6–17	2,276
September 18	1:00 p.m.	Morgan State*	Campus Field; Fairfield, CT		W 21–7	4,626
September 25	1:30 p.m.	at Dartmouth*	Memorial Field; Hanover, NH		L 3–41	5,121
October 2	1:00 p.m.	at Howard*	William H. Greene Stadium; Washington, DC		L 17–22	5,235
October 9	2:00 p.m.	Merrimack	Campus Field; Fairfield, CT		W 20–10	4,993
October 16	1:00 p.m.	Central Connecticut	Campus Field; Fairfield, CT		W 27–17	2,853
October 23	12:30 p.m.	Duquesne	Campus Field; Fairfield, CT	ESPN3	W 31–13	7,327
November 6	12:00 p.m.	at Saint Francis (PA)	DeGol Field; Loretto, PA		W 14–13	1,077
November 13	12:00 p.m.	Wagner	Campus Field; Fairfield, CT		W 27–0	3,483
November 20	12:00 p.m.	at LIU	Bethpage Federal Credit Union Stadium; Brookville, NY	ESPN3	W 38–14	1,092
November 27	12:00 p.m.	at No. 24 Holy Cross*	Fitton Field; Worcester, MA (NCAA Division I First Round)	ESPN+	L 10–13	4,163
*Non-conference game; Rankings from STATS Poll released prior to the game; All times are in Eastern time
