= 2021 Saint Francis Red Flash football team =

American college football season

2021 Saint Francis Red Flash football
- Conference: Northeast Conference
- Record: 5–6 (4–3 NEC)
- Head coach: Chris Villarrial (11th season)
- Offensive coordinator: Marco Pecora (2nd season season)
- Defensive coordinator: Scott Lewis (1st season)
- Home stadium: DeGol Field

2021 Northeast Conference football standings
	Conf.			Overall
Team	W		L	W		L
Sacred Heart $^	6	–	1	8	–	4
Duquesne	5	–	2	7	–	3
Bryant	5	–	2	7	–	4
Central Connecticut	4	–	3	4	–	7
Saint Francis (PA)	4	–	3	5	–	6
Merrimack *	2	–	5	5	–	6
LIU	2	–	5	2	–	8
Wagner	0	–	7	0	–	11
$ – Conference champion; ^ – FCS playoff participant; Note: Merrimack ineligible for NEC title and FCS postseason play due to transition from NCAA Division II

The 2021 Saint Francis Red Flash football team represented Saint Francis University as a member of the Northeast Conference (NEC) in the 2021 NCAA Division I FCS football season. The Red Flash, led by 11th-year head coach Chris Villarrial, played their home games at DeGol Field.

== Schedule ==
Date	Time	Opponent	Site	TV	Result	Attendance
September 3	7:00 p.m.	at Eastern Michigan*	Rynearson Stadium; Ypsilanti, MI	ESPN3	L 15–35	16,461
September 11	6:00 p.m.	at No. 6 Delaware*	Delaware Stadium; Newark, DE	FloSports	L 10–27	13,351
September 18	12:00 p.m.	Wagner	DeGol Field; Loretto, PA		W 39–24	1,472
September 25	12:00 p.m.	Norfolk State*	DeGol Field; Loretto, PA		L 16–28	1,234
October 2	12:00 p.m.	at Morgan State*	Hughes Stadium; Baltimore, MD		W 27–14	2,017
October 9	1:00 p.m.	LIU	DeGol Field; Loretto, PA		W 55–10	1,464
October 16	12:00 p.m.	at Bryant	Beirne Stadium; Smithfield, RI		L 17–18	3,150
October 30	3:00 p.m.	at Duquesne	Arthur J. Rooney Athletic Field; Pittsburgh, PA	ESPN3	W 17–10	1,330
November 6	12:00 p.m.	Sacred Heart	DeGol Field; Loretto, PA		L 13–14	1,077
November 13	12:00 p.m.	Merrimack	DeGol Field; Loretto, PA		W 22–6	834
November 20	12:00 p.m.	at Central Connecticut	Arute Field; New Britain, CT		L 21–24	1,538
*Non-conference game; Rankings from STATS Poll released prior to the game; All times are in Eastern time
