= 2021 Delaware State Hornets football team =

American college football season

2021 Delaware State Hornets football
- Conference: Mid-Eastern Athletic Conference
- Record: 5–6 (2–3 MEAC)
- Head coach: Rod Milstead (4th season)
- Offensive coordinator: Steve Azzanesi (2nd season season)
- Defensive coordinator: Leandre Creamer (1st season)
- Home stadium: Alumni Stadium

2021 Mid-Eastern Athletic Conference football standings
	Conf.			Overall
Team	W		L	W		L
South Carolina State $	5	–	0	7	–	5
North Carolina Central	4	–	1	6	–	5
Delaware State	2	–	3	5	–	6
Norfolk State	2	–	3	6	–	5
Howard	1	–	4	3	–	8
Morgan State	1	–	4	2	–	9
$ – Conference champion

The 2021 Delaware State Hornets football team represented Delaware State University as a member of the Mid-Eastern Athletic Conference (MEAC) in the 2021 NCAA Division I FCS football season. The Hornets, led by fourth-year head coach Rod Milstead, played their home games at Alumni Stadium.

== Schedule ==
Date	Time	Opponent	Site	TV	Result	Attendance
September 4	4:00 p.m.	Bowie State*	Alumni Stadium; Dover, DE	ESPN+	W 32–24	5,125
September 11	2:00 p.m.	Georgetown*	Alumni Stadium; Dover, DE	ESPN+	L 14–20 ^{OT}	2,442
September 18	7:30 p.m.	at No. 16 East Tennessee State*	William B. Greene Jr. Stadium; Johnson City, TN	ESPN+	L 6–38	8,015
September 25	2:00 p.m.	Merrimack*	Alumni Stadium; Dover, DE	ESPN+	L 10–47	1,843
October 2	5:00 p.m.	at Wagner*	Wagner College Stadium; Staten Island, NY	NEC Front Row	W 33–27 ^{2OT}	2,512
October 9	2:00 p.m.	Virginia–Lynchburg*	Alumni Stadium; Dover, DE	ESPN+	W 56–6	1,628
October 23	2:00 p.m.	South Carolina State	Alumni Stadium; Dover, DE	ESPN3	L 7–13	3,227
October 30	2:00 p.m.	Howard	Alumni Stadium; Dover, DE	ESPN+	W 30–23	1,776
November 4	7:30 p.m.	at Morgan State	Hughes Stadium; Baltimore, MD	ESPN2	L 14–20	1,749
November 13	1:00 p.m.	Norfolk State	Alumni Stadium; Dover, DE	ESPN+	W 28–26	2,499
November 20	2:00 p.m.	at North Carolina Central	O'Kelly–Riddick Stadium; Durham, NC	ESPN+	L 28–34	4,525
*Non-conference game; Rankings from STATS Poll released prior to the game; All times are in Eastern time
