= 2018 Merrimack Warriors football team =

American college football season

2018 Merrimack Warriors football
- Conference: Northeast-10 Conference
- Record: 5–5 (5–4 NE-10)
- Head coach: Dan Curran (6th season)
- Defensive coordinator: Mike Gennetti (14th season)
- Home stadium: Duane Stadium

2018 Northeast-10 Conference football standings
	Conf.			Overall
Team	W		L	W		L
No. 21 LIU Post $^	9	–	0	10	–	1
No. 23 New Haven ^	8	–	1	9	–	3
Pace	6	–	3	7	–	3
Assumption	6	–	3	6	–	4
Merrimack	5	–	4	5	–	5
Bentley	4	–	5	4	–	6
Southern Connecticut	3	–	6	4	–	6
Stonehill	2	–	7	2	–	8
American International	1	–	8	1	–	8
Saint Anselm	1	–	8	1	–	8
$ – Conference champion; ^ – NCAA Division II playoff participant; Rankings from AFCA poll

The 2018 Merrimack Warriors football team represented Merrimack College as a member of the Northeast-10 Conference (NE-10) during the 2018 NCAA Division II football season. Led by sixth-year head coach Dan Curran, Merrimack compiled an overall record of 5–5 with a mark of 5–4 in conference play, placing fifth in the NE-10. The Warriors played their home games at Duane Stadium on North Andover, Massachusetts

== Schedule ==
Date	Time	Opponent	Site	Result
September 1	2:00 p.m.	at Bloomsburg*	Redman Stadium; Bloomsburg, PA	L 16–30
September 8	6:00 p.m.	Assumption	Duane Stadium; North Andover, MA	L 19–49
September 15	2:00 p.m.	at Bentley	Bentley Field; Waltham, MA	W 35–30
September 22	6:00 p.m.	New Haven	Duane Stadium; North Andover, MA	L 18–44
September 29	1:00 p.m.	LIU Post	Duane Stadium; North Andover, MA	L 20–37
October 13	6:00 p.m.	at Stonehill	W.B. Mason Stadium; Easton, MA	W 38–24
October 20	12:00 p.m.	at Saint Anselm	Grappone Stadium; Manchester, NH	W 31–28
October 27	1:00 p.m.	American International	Duane Stadium; North Andover, MA	W 14–0
November 3	12:00 p.m.	at Pace	Pace Stadium; Pleasantville, NY	L 21–22
November 10	1:00 p.m.	Southern Connecticut State	Duane Stadium; North Andover, MA	W 31–14
*Non-conference game; All times are in Eastern time
