= 2021 Duquesne Dukes football team =

American college football season

2021 Duquesne Dukes football
- Conference: Northeast Conference
- Record: 7–3 (5–2 NEC)
- Head coach: Jerry Schmitt (17th season)
- Offensive coordinator: Anthony Doria (6th season)
- Defensive coordinator: Dave Opfar (12th season)
- Home stadium: Arthur J. Rooney Athletic Field

2021 Northeast Conference football standings
| | Conf. | | | Overall |
| Team | W | | L | W | | L |
|---|---|---|---|---|---|---|
| Sacred Heart $^ | 6 | – | 1 | 8 | – | 4 |
| Duquesne | 5 | – | 2 | 7 | – | 3 |
| Bryant | 5 | – | 2 | 7 | – | 4 |
| Central Connecticut | 4 | – | 3 | 4 | – | 7 |
| Saint Francis (PA) | 4 | – | 3 | 5 | – | 6 |
| Merrimack * | 2 | – | 5 | 5 | – | 6 |
| LIU | 2 | – | 5 | 2 | – | 8 |
| Wagner | 0 | – | 7 | 0 | – | 11 |
$ – Conference champion; ^ – FCS playoff participant; Note: Merrimack ineligible for NEC title and FCS postseason play due to transition from NCAA Division II

The 2021 Duquesne Dukes football team represented Duquesne University as a member of the Northeast Conference (NEC) in the 2021 NCAA Division I FCS football season. The Dukes, led by 17th-year head coach Jerry Schmitt, played their home games at Arthur J. Rooney Athletic Field.

== Schedule ==
| Date | Time | Opponent | Site | TV | Result | Attendance | Source |
|---|---|---|---|---|---|---|---|
| September 4 | 8:00 p.m. | at TCU* | Amon G. Carter Stadium; Fort Worth, TX | ESPN+ | L 3–45 | 35,377 | |
| September 11 | 2:00 p.m. | at Ohio* | Peden Stadium; Athens, OH | ESPN3 | W 28–26 | 19,411 | |
| September 25 | 1:00 p.m. | Virginia–Lynchburg* | Arthur J. Rooney Athletic Field; Pittsburgh, PA | | W 56–7 | 2,454 | |
| October 2 | 1:00 p.m. | at Merrimack | Duane Stadium; North Andover, MA | | W 37–14 | 12,147 | |
| October 9 | 12:00 p.m. | Bryant | Arthur J. Rooney Athletic Field; Pittsburgh, PA | | W 39–34 | 0 | |
| October 23 | 12:00 p.m. | at Sacred Heart | Campus Field; Fairfield, CT | ESPN3 | L 13–31 | 7,327 | |
| October 30 | 3:00 p.m. | Saint Francis (PA) | Arthur J. Rooney Athletic Field; Pittsburgh, PA | ESPN3 | L 10–17 | 1,330 | |
| November 6 | 12:00 p.m. | at LIU | Bethpage Federal Credit Union Stadium; Brookville, NY | | W 34–28 | 874 | |
| November 13 | 12:00 p.m. | Central Connecticut | Arthur J. Rooney Athletic Field; Pittsburgh, PA | | W 31–27 | 1,114 | |
| November 20 | 12:00 p.m. | at Wagner | Wagner College Stadium; Staten Island, NY | | W 44–0 | 1,453 | |
*Non-conference game; Rankings from STATS Poll released prior to the game; All times are in Eastern time

== Game summaries ==
=== At TCU ===
Duquesne Dukes (0–0) vs. TCU Horned Frogs (0–0)

| Quarter | 1 | 2 | 3 | 4 | Total |
|---|---|---|---|---|---|
| Duquesne | 0 | 0 | 3 | 0 | 3 |
| TCU | 21 | 14 | 3 | 7 | 45 |

at Amon G. Carter Stadium • Fort Worth, TX

- Date: Saturday, September 4, 2021
- Game time: 8:00 p.m. EDT
- Game weather: sunny • Temperature: 94°F
- Game attendance: 35,377
- Referee: Scott Campbell
- TV announcers (ESPN+): Chuckie Kempf, Ryan Leaf

Game information

First Quarter

- (9:12) TCU – Max Duggan 8 yard run, Griffin Kell kick (Drive: 13 plays, 90 yards, 5:39; TCU 7–0)
- (5:31) TCU – Emari Demercado 2 yard run, Griffin Kell kick (Drive: 4 plays, 60 yards, 2:11; TCU 14–0)
- (1:28) TCU – Zach Evans 2 yard run, Griffin Kell kick (Drive: 6 plays, 49 yards, 3:05; TCU 21–0)

Second Quarter

- (8:00) TCU – Kendre Miller 5 yard run, Griffin Kell kick (Drive: 4 plays, 30 yards, 1:28; TCU 28–0)
- (0:51) TCU – JD Spielman 16 yard pass from Max Duggan, Griffin Kell kick (Drive: 9 plays, 52 yards, 3:41; TCU 35–0)

Third Quarter

- (8:19) DUQ – Brian Bruzdewicz 26 yard field goal (Drive: 8 plays, 57 yards, 3:41; TCU 35–3)
- (1:43) TCU – Griffin Kell 18 yard field goal (Drive: 12 plays, 47 yards, 6:25; TCU 38–3)

Fourth Quarter

- (4:20) TCU – Blake Nowell 20 yard pass from Chandler Morris, Griffin Kell kick (Drive: 1 play, 20 yards, 0:08; TCU 45–3)

| Statistics | DUQ | TCU |
|---|---|---|
| First downs | 6 | 26 |
| Total yards | 137 | 431 |
| Rushes/yards | 29/61 | 38/178 |
| Passing yards | 76 | 253 |
| Passing: Comp–Att–Int | 3–12–1 | 18–24–1 |
| Time of possession | 29:19 | 30:41 |

| Team | Category | Player | Statistics |
|---|---|---|---|
| Duquesne | Passing | Darius Perrantes | 3–9, 76 yards |
| Duquesne | Rushing | Garrett Owens | 14 carries, 35 yards |
| Duquesne | Receiving | Cyrus Holder | 2 receptions, 64 yards |
| TCU | Passing | Max Duggan | 14–19, 207 yards, 1 TD, 1 INT |
| TCU | Rushing | Kendre Miller | 8 carries, 54 yards, 1 TD |
| TCU | Receiving | Derius Davis | 2 receptions, 57 yards |
