= 2017 Saint Francis Red Flash football team =

American college football season

2017 Saint Francis Red Flash football
- Conference: Northeast Conference
- Record: 5–6 (3–3 NEC)
- Head coach: Chris Villarrial (8th season)
- Offensive coordinator: Eric Long
- Defensive coordinator: Michael Craig
- Home stadium: DeGol Field

2017 Northeast Conference football standings
	Conf.			Overall
Team	W		L	W		L
Central Connecticut $^	6	–	0	8	–	3
Duquesne	4	–	2	7	–	4
Bryant	4	–	2	6	–	5
Saint Francis (PA)	3	–	3	5	–	6
Sacred Heart	2	–	4	4	–	7
Wagner	2	–	4	4	–	7
Robert Morris	0	–	6	2	–	9
$ – Conference champion; ^ – FCS playoff participant

The 2017 Saint Francis Red Flash football team represented Saint Francis University in the 2017 NCAA Division I FCS football season. They were led by eighth-year head coach Chris Villarrial and played their home games at DeGol Field. They were a member of the Northeast Conference. They finished the season 5–6, 3–3 in NEC play to finish in fourth place.

== Schedule ==
Date	Time	Opponent	Site	TV	Result	Attendance
September 2	12:00 p.m.	Lock Haven*	DeGol Field; Loretto, PA	NECFR	W 69–3	1,505
September 9	12:00 p.m.	Wagner	DeGol Field; Loretto, PA	ESPN3	W 31–6	1,231
September 16	7:00 p.m.	Towson*	DeGol Field; Loretto, PA	NECFR	L 14–16	2,412
September 30	6:00 p.m.	at No. 22 Liberty*	Williams Stadium; Lynchburg, VA	BSN	W 13–7	15,886
October 7	1:00 p.m.	at Presbyterian*	Bailey Memorial Stadium; Clinton, SC	BSN	L 14–26	1,675
October 14	12:00 p.m.	at Bryant	Beirne Stadium; Smithfield, RI	NECFR	W 30–14	3,069
October 21	12:00 p.m.	at Duquesne	Arthur J. Rooney Athletic Field; Pittsburgh, PA	ESPN3	L 7–24	2,537
October 28	Noon	Robert Morris^{†}	DeGol Field; Loretto, PA	NECFR	W 36–7	1,655
November 4	12:00 p.m.	at Central Connecticut	Arute Field; New Britain, CT	NECFR	L 10–28	2,211
November 11	12:00 p.m.	Sacred Heart	DeGol Field; Loretto, PA	NECFR	L 7–16	1,262
November 18	1:00 p.m.	at Eastern Kentucky*	Roy Kidd Stadium; Richmond, KY	OVCDN	L 10–14	3,720
*Non-conference game; ^{†}Homecoming; Rankings from STATS Poll released prior to the game; All times are in Eastern time

== Game summaries ==
=== Lock Haven ===
	1	2	3	4	Total
Bald Eagles	0	3	0	0	3
Red Flash	24	21	3	21	69

=== Wagner ===
	1	2	3	4	Total
Seahawks	3	3	0	0	6
Red Flash	7	7	7	10	31

=== Towson ===
	1	2	3	4	Total
Tigers	0	0	3	13	16
Red Flash	0	7	0	7	14

=== at Liberty ===
	1	2	3	4	Total
Red Flash	0	6	7	0	13
No. 22 Flames	0	0	0	7	7

=== at Presbyterian ===
	1	2	3	4	Total
Red Flash	0	0	7	7	14
Blue Hose	3	9	0	14	26

=== at Bryant ===
	1	2	3	4	Total
Red Flash	0	17	3	10	30
Bulldogs	0	0	7	7	14

=== at Duquesne ===
	1	2	3	4	Total
Red Flash	7	0	0	0	7
Dukes	10	14	0	0	24

=== Robert Morris ===
	1	2	3	4	Total
Colonials	7	0	0	0	7
Red Flash	10	7	12	7	36

=== at Central Connecticut ===
	1	2	3	4	Total
Red Flash	0	7	3	0	10
Blue Devils	7	7	0	14	28

=== Sacred Heart ===
	1	2	3	4	Total
Pioneers	10	3	3	0	16
Red Flash	0	7	0	0	7

=== at Eastern Kentucky ===
	1	2	3	4	Total
Red Flash	0	3	7	0	10
Colonels	0	7	0	7	14
