= 2017 Central Connecticut Blue Devils football team =

American college football season

2017 Central Connecticut Blue Devils football
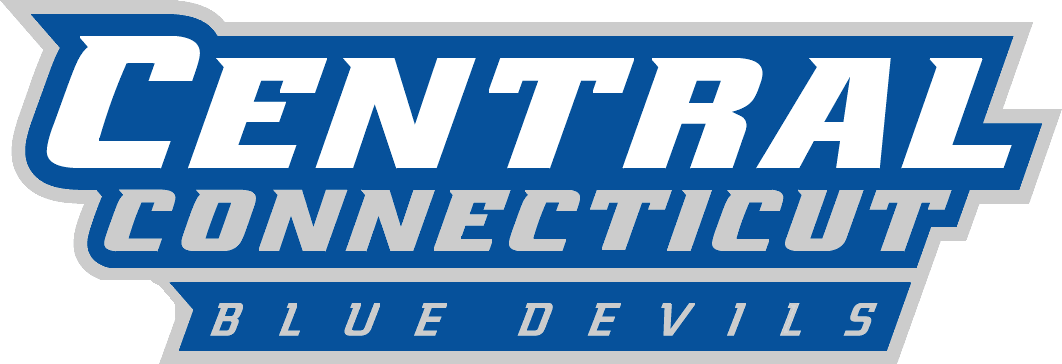

NEC champion

FCS Playoffs First Round, L 0–14 vs. New Hampshire
- Conference: Northeast Conference
- Record: 8–4 (6–0 NEC)
- Head coach: Pete Rossomando (4th season)
- Offensive coordinator: Ryan McCarthy
- Defensive coordinator: Andrew Christ
- Home stadium: Arute Field

2017 Northeast Conference football standings
	Conf.			Overall
Team	W		L	W		L
Central Connecticut $^	6	–	0	8	–	3
Duquesne	4	–	2	7	–	4
Bryant	4	–	2	6	–	5
Saint Francis (PA)	3	–	3	5	–	6
Sacred Heart	2	–	4	4	–	7
Wagner	2	–	4	4	–	7
Robert Morris	0	–	6	2	–	9
$ – Conference champion; ^ – FCS playoff participant

The 2017 Central Connecticut Blue Devils football team represented Central Connecticut State University in the 2017 NCAA Division I FCS football season. The team was led by fourth-year head coach Pete Rossomando and played their home games at Arute Field. They were a member of the Northeast Conference. They finished the season 8–4, 6–0 in NEC play to win the conference title. They received the NEC's automatic bid to the FCS Playoffs, their first FCS playoff appearance in school history, where they were defeated by New Hampshire in the first round.

== Schedule ==
Date	Time	Opponent	Site	TV	Result	Attendance
September 1	7:00 p.m.	at Syracuse*	Carrier Dome; Syracuse, NY	ACC Extra	L 7–50	30,273
September 9	12:00 p.m.	Fordham*	Arute Field; New Britain, CT	NECFR	L 31–38	4,414
September 16	2:00 p.m.	at No. 6 Youngstown State*	Stambaugh Stadium; Youngstown, OH	ESPN3	L 9–59	15,377
September 23	12:00 p.m.	Walsh*	Arute Field; New Britain, CT	NECFR	W 57–6	2,654
September 30	5:00 p.m.	at Sacred Heart	Campus Field; Fairfield, CT	ESPN3	W 26–15	3,063
October 7	1:00 p.m.	Penn*^{†}	Arute Field; New Britain, CT	NECFR	W 42–21	4,917
October 14	6:00 p.m.	at Wagner	Wagner College Stadium; Staten Island, NY	NECFR	W 51–45 ^{4OT}	2,562
October 21	12:00 p.m.	Bryant	Arute Field; New Britain, CT	NECFR	W 31–14	3,152
November 4	12:00 p.m.	Saint Francis	Arute Field; New Britain, CT	NECFR	W 28–10	2,211
November 11	12:00 p.m.	at Duquesne	Arthur J. Rooney Athletic Field; Pittsburgh, PA	ESPN3	W 28–27	1,423
November 18	12:00 p.m.	Robert Morris	Arute Field; New Britain, CT	NECFR	W 42–14	2,214
November 25	2:00 p.m.	at No. 21 New Hampshire*	Wildcat Stadium; Durham, NH (NCAA Division I First Round)	ESPN3	L 0–14	2,385
*Non-conference game; ^{†}Homecoming; Rankings from STATS Poll released prior to the game; All times are in Eastern time
