= 2021 Central Connecticut Blue Devils football team =

American college football season

2021 Central Connecticut Blue Devils football
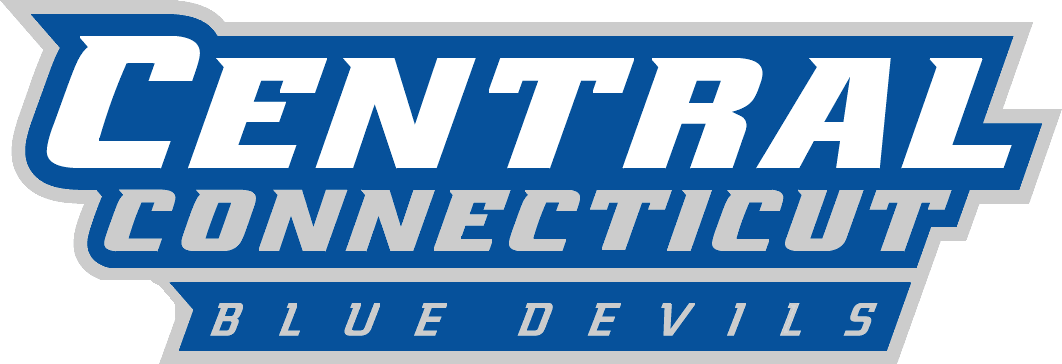
- Conference: Northeast Conference
- Record: 4–7 (4–3 NEC)
- Head coach: Ryan McCarthy (3rd season)
- Offensive coordinator: Jeff Ambrosie (3rd season)
- Defensive coordinator: Ron DiGravio (3rd season)
- Home stadium: Arute Field

2021 Northeast Conference football standings
	Conf.			Overall
Team	W		L	W		L
Sacred Heart $^	6	–	1	8	–	4
Duquesne	5	–	2	7	–	3
Bryant	5	–	2	7	–	4
Central Connecticut	4	–	3	4	–	7
Saint Francis (PA)	4	–	3	5	–	6
Merrimack *	2	–	5	5	–	6
LIU	2	–	5	2	–	8
Wagner	0	–	7	0	–	11
$ – Conference champion; ^ – FCS playoff participant; Note: Merrimack ineligible for NEC title and FCS postseason play due to transition from NCAA Division II

The 2021 Central Connecticut Blue Devils football team represented Central Connecticut State University as a member of the Northeast Conference (NEC) during the 2021 NCAA Division I FCS football season. The Blue Devils, led by third-year head coach Ryan McCarthy, played their home games at Arute Field. Central Connecticut compiled an overall record of 4–7 with a mark of 4–3 in conference play, tying for fourth place in the NEC.

== Schedule ==
Date	Time	Opponent	Site	TV	Result	Attendance
September 3	6:00 p.m.	Southern Connecticut*	Arute Field; New Britain, CT	NEC Front Row	L 21–28	4,500
September 11	3:00 p.m.	at Wagner	Wagner College Stadium; Staten Island, NY	NEC Front Row	W 21–19	2,271
September 18	12:00 p.m.	No. 15 Southeastern Louisiana*	Arute Field; New Britain, CT	NEC Front Row	L 10–56	3,117
September 25	12:30 p.m.	at Miami (FL)*	Hard Rock Stadium; Miami Gardens, FL	ACCRSN	L 0–69	44,019
October 9	1:00 p.m.	Columbia*	Arute Field; New Britain, CT	NEC Front Row	L 20–22	4,117
October 16	1:00 p.m.	at Sacred Heart	Campus Field; Fairfield, CT	NEC Front Row	L 17–27	2,853
October 23	12:00 p.m.	LIU	Arute Field; New Britain, CT	NEC Front Row	L 13–30	2,114
October 30	1:00 p.m.	at Merrimack	Duane Stadium; North Andover, MA	NEC Front Row	W 49–21	1,148
November 6	12:00 p.m.	Bryant	Arute Field; New Britain, CT	ESPN3	W 30–15	2,171
November 13	12:00 p.m.	at Duquesne	Arthur J. Rooney Athletic Field; Pittsburgh, PA	NEC Front Row	L 27–31	1,114
November 20	12:00 p.m.	Saint Francis (PA)	Arute Field; New Britain, CT	NEC Front Row	W 24–21	1,538
*Non-conference game; Rankings from STATS Poll released prior to the game; All times are in Eastern time; Source:
