= 2017 Duquesne Dukes football team =

American college football season

2017 Duquesne Dukes football
- Conference: Northeast Conference
- Record: 7–4 (4–2 NEC)
- Head coach: Jerry Schmitt (13th season)
- Offensive coordinator: Anthony Doria
- Defensive coordinator: Dave Opfar
- Home stadium: Arthur J. Rooney Athletic Field

2017 Northeast Conference football standings
	Conf.			Overall
Team	W		L	W		L
Central Connecticut $^	6	–	0	8	–	3
Duquesne	4	–	2	7	–	4
Bryant	4	–	2	6	–	5
Saint Francis (PA)	3	–	3	5	–	6
Sacred Heart	2	–	4	4	–	7
Wagner	2	–	4	4	–	7
Robert Morris	0	–	6	2	–	9
$ – Conference champion; ^ – FCS playoff participant

The 2017 Duquesne Dukes football team represented Duquesne University in the 2017 NCAA Division I FCS football season. They were led by 13th-year head coach Jerry Schmitt and played their home games at Arthur J. Rooney Athletic Field. They were a member of the Northeast Conference. They finished the season 7–4, 4–2 in NEC play to finish in a tie for second place.

== Schedule ==
Date	Time	Opponent	Site	TV	Result	Attendance
August 31	8:00 p.m.	at No. 4 South Dakota State*	Dana J. Dykhouse Stadium; Brookings, SD	AT&T SportsNet Pitt. ESPN3	L 13–51	12,218
September 9	2:00 p.m.	at Valparaiso*	Brown Field; Valparaiso, IN		W 45–40	2,932
September 16	1:00 p.m.	at Dayton*	Welcome Stadium; Dayton, OH	Spectrum Sports; YouTube	W 28–23	5,753
September 30	7:00 p.m.	West Virginia Wesleyan*	Arthur J. Rooney Athletic Field; Pittsburgh, PA	NECFR	W 38–14	2,144
October 7	1:00 p.m.	Wagner^{†}	Arthur J. Rooney Athletic Field; Pittsburgh, PA	ESPN3	W 38–0	2,743
October 14	6:00 p.m.	at Robert Morris	Joe Walton Stadium; Moon Township, PA	ESPN3	W 51-14	3,057
October 21	Noon	Saint Francis (PA)	Arthur J. Rooney Athletic Field; Pittsburgh, PA	ESPN3	W 24-7	2,537
October 28	Noon	at Sacred Heart	Campus Field; Fairfield, CT	NECFR	W 37-21	1,903
November 4	3:30 p.m.	at Liberty*	Williams Stadium; Lynchburg, VA	BSN	L 24–27	14,634
November 11	Noon	Central Connecticut	Arthur J. Rooney Athletic Field; Pittsburgh, PA	NECFR	L 27–28	1,423
November 18	Noon	at Bryant	Beirne Stadium; Smithfield, RI	NECFR	L 29–38	983
*Non-conference game; ^{†}Homecoming; Rankings from STATS FCS Poll released prior to game Poll released prior to the game; All times are in Eastern time

- Source: Schedule
