= 2021 Howard Bison football team =

American college football season

2021 Howard Bison football
- Conference: Mid-Eastern Athletic Conference
- Record: 3–8 (1–4 MEAC)
- Head coach: Larry Scott (2nd season)
- Offensive coordinator: Lee Hull (2nd season)
- Defensive coordinator: Troy Douglas (2nd season)
- Home stadium: William H. Greene Stadium

2021 Mid-Eastern Athletic Conference football standings
	Conf.			Overall
Team	W		L	W		L
South Carolina State $	5	–	0	7	–	5
North Carolina Central	4	–	1	6	–	5
Delaware State	2	–	3	5	–	6
Norfolk State	2	–	3	6	–	5
Howard	1	–	4	3	–	8
Morgan State	1	–	4	2	–	9
$ – Conference champion

The 2021 Howard Bison football team represented Howard University as a member of the Mid-Eastern Athletic Conference (MEAC) during the 2021 NCAA Division I FCS football season. Led by second-year head coach Larry Scott, the Bison compiled an overall record of 3–8 with a mark of 1–4 in conference play, tying for fifth place in the MEAC. Howard played home games at William H. Greene Stadium in Washington, D.C.

== Schedule ==
Date	Time	Opponent	Site	TV	Result	Attendance
September 4	2:00 p.m.	at Richmond*	E. Claiborne Robins Stadium; Richmond, VA		L 14–38	7,048
September 11	7:30 p.m.	at Maryland*	Maryland Stadium; College Park, MD	BTN	L 0–62	31,612
September 18	12:00 p.m.	Hampton*	Audi Field; Washington, DC (The Real HU)	NBCSN	L 32–48	14,752
September 25	12:00 p.m.	at Robert Morris*	Joe Walton Stadium; Moon Township, PA		L 16–22	2,514
October 2	1:00 p.m.	Sacred Heart*	William H. Greene Stadium; Washington, DC		W 22–17	5,235
October 8	7:00 p.m.	Morgan State	William H. Greene Stadium; Washington, DC (rivalry)	ESPNU	W 27–0	8,632
October 23	1:00 p.m.	Norfolk State	William H. Greene Stadium; Washington, DC	ESPN3	L 31–45	10,437
October 30	2:00 p.m.	Delaware State	Alumni Stadium; Dover, DE	ESPN+	L 23–30	1,776
November 6	1:30 p.m.	at South Carolina State	Oliver C. Dawson Stadium; Orangeburg, SC	ESPN+	L 12–15	6,500
November 13	1:00 p.m.	North Carolina Central	William H. Greene Stadium; Washington, DC	ESPN+	L 27–45	4,597
November 20	1:00 p.m.	Virginia–Lynchburg*	William H. Greene Stadium; Washington, DC	ESPN+	W 56–6	
*Non-conference game
