= 2017 Bryant Bulldogs football team =

American college football season

2017 Bryant Bulldogs football
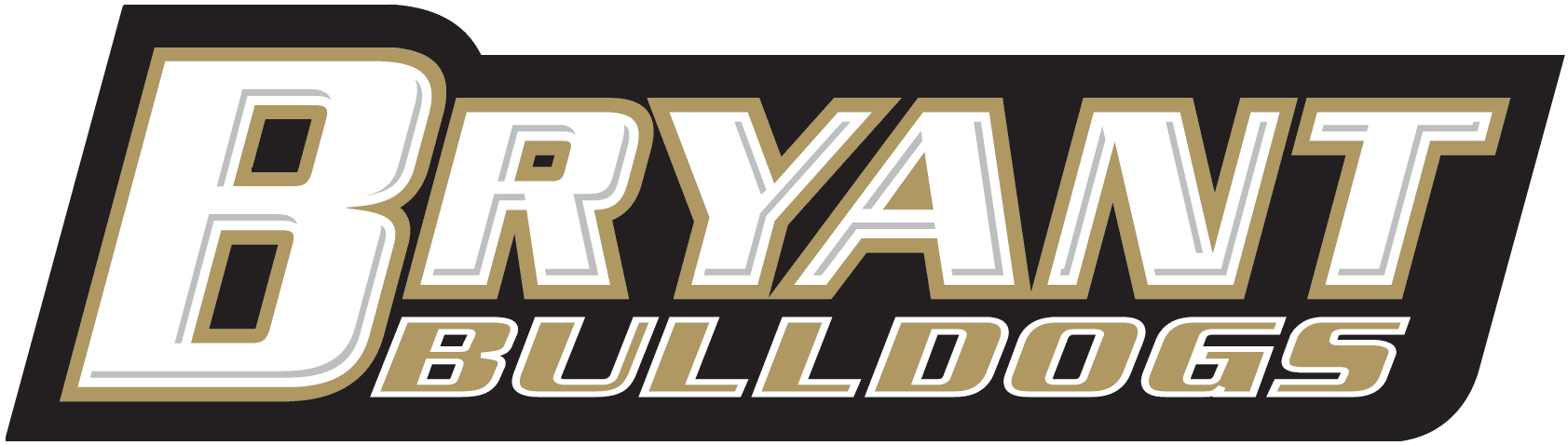
- Conference: Northeast Conference
- Record: 6–5 (4–2 NEC)
- Head coach: James Perry (1st season)
- Offensive coordinator: Vinny Marino (1st season)
- Defensive coordinator: Kevin Kelly (1st season)
- Home stadium: Beirne Stadium

2017 Northeast Conference football standings
| | Conf. | | | Overall |
| Team | W | | L | W | | L |
|---|---|---|---|---|---|---|
| Central Connecticut $^ | 6 | – | 0 | 8 | – | 3 |
| Duquesne | 4 | – | 2 | 7 | – | 4 |
| Bryant | 4 | – | 2 | 6 | – | 5 |
| Saint Francis (PA) | 3 | – | 3 | 5 | – | 6 |
| Sacred Heart | 2 | – | 4 | 4 | – | 7 |
| Wagner | 2 | – | 4 | 4 | – | 7 |
| Robert Morris | 0 | – | 6 | 2 | – | 9 |
$ – Conference champion; ^ – FCS playoff participant

The 2017 Bryant Bulldogs football team represented Bryant University as a member of the Northeast Conference (NEC) during the 2017 NCAA Division I FCS football season. Led by first-year head coach James Perry, the Bulldogs compiled an overall record of 6–5 with a mark of 4–2 in conference play, tying for second place in the NEC. Bryant played home games at Beirne Stadium in Smithfield, Rhode Island.

== Schedule ==
| Date | Time | Opponent | Site | TV | Result | Attendance |
|---|---|---|---|---|---|---|
| September 2 | 3:00 p.m. | Merrimack* | Beirne Stadium; Smithfield, RI | NECFR | W 49–41 | 6,432 |
| September 9 | 3:30 p.m. | at Maine* | Alfond Stadium; Orono, ME | FCS | L 12–60 | 6,313 |
| September 16 | 12:30 p.m. | at Brown* | Brown Stadium; Providence | ILDN | L 23–28 | 3,770 |
| September 23 | 1:00 p.m. | Fordham*^{†} | Beirne Stadium; Smithfield, RI | NECFR | W 45–40 | 7,532 |
| September 30 | 6:00 p.m. | at No. 15 New Hampshire* | Wildcat Stadium; Durham, NH | ESPN3 | L 17–45 | 7,951 |
| October 14 | 1:00 p.m. | Saint Francis (PA) | Beirne Stadium; Smithfield, RI | NECFR | L 14–30 | 3,069 |
| October 21 | 12:00 p.m. | at Central Connecticut | Arute Field; New Britain, CT | | L 14–31 | 3,152 |
| October 28 | 12:00 p.m. | at Wagner | Wagner College Stadium; Staten Island, NY | ESPN3 | W 31–16 | 1,888 |
| November 4 | 12:00 p.m. | Sacred Heart | Beirne Stadium; Smithfield, RI | ESPN3 | W 48–45 | 1,136 |
| November 11 | 12:00 p.m. | at Robert Morris | Joe Walton Stadium; Moon Township, PA | | W 42–17 | 1,191 |
| November 18 | 12:00 p.m. | Duquesne | Beirne Stadium; Smithfield, RI | NECFR | W 38–29 | 983 |
*Non-conference game; ^{†}Homecoming; Rankings from STATS Poll released prior to the game; All times are in Eastern time
