= 2017 Robert Morris Colonials football team =

American college football season

2017 Robert Morris Colonials football
- Conference: Northeast Conference
- Record: 2–9 (0–6 NEC)
- Head coach: John Banaszak (4th season)
- Offensive coordinator: Mike Miller (2nd season)
- Defensive coordinator: Scott Farison (10th season)
- Home stadium: Joe Walton Stadium

2017 Northeast Conference football standings
	Conf.			Overall
Team	W		L	W		L
Central Connecticut $^	6	–	0	8	–	3
Duquesne	4	–	2	7	–	4
Bryant	4	–	2	6	–	5
Saint Francis (PA)	3	–	3	5	–	6
Sacred Heart	2	–	4	4	–	7
Wagner	2	–	4	4	–	7
Robert Morris	0	–	6	2	–	9
$ – Conference champion; ^ – FCS playoff participant

The 2017 Robert Morris Colonials football team represented Robert Morris University during the 2017 NCAA Division I FCS football season. They were led by fourth-year head coach John Banaszak and played their home games at Joe Walton Stadium. They were a member of the Northeast Conference. They finished the season 2–9, 0–6 in NEC play to finish in last place.

On November 19, Banaszak announced his retirement. He finished at Robert Morris with a four-year record of 8–34.

== Schedule ==
Date	Time	Opponent	Site	TV	Result	Attendance
September 2	12:00 p.m.	Dayton*	Joe Walton Stadium; Moon Township, PA	NECFR	W 13–10	1,929
September 9	2:00 p.m.	at No. 8 Youngstown State*	Stambaugh Stadium; Youngstown, OH	ESPN3	L 0–30	13,900
September 16	3:00 p.m.	VMI*	Joe Walton Stadium; Moon Township, PA	NECFR	W 23–0	2,634
September 23	3:30 p.m.	at No. 2 North Dakota State*	Fargodome; Fargo, ND	ESPN3	L 0–56	18,308
October 7	3:30 p.m.	at East Tennessee State*	William B. Greene Jr. Stadium; Johnson City, TN	ESPN3	L 3–16	8,540
October 14	6:00 p.m.	Duquesne	Joe Walton Stadium; Moon Township, PA	ESPN3	L 14–51	3,057
October 21	12:00 p.m.	Sacred Heart	Joe Walton Stadium; Moon Township, PA		L 14–21	1,288
October 28	12:00 p.m.	at Saint Francis (PA)	DeGol Field; Loretto, PA		L 7–36	1,655
November 4	12:00 p.m.	at Wagner	Wagner College Stadium; Staten Island, NY		L 7–27	1,803
November 11	12:00 p.m.	Bryant	Joe Walton Stadium; Moon Township, PA		L 17–42	1,191
November 18	12:00 p.m.	at Central Connecticut	Arute Field; New Britain, CT		L 14–42	2,214
*Non-conference game; Rankings from STATS Poll released prior to the game; All times are in Eastern time

== Game summaries ==
=== Dayton ===
	1	2	3	4	Total
Flyers	7	3	0	0	10
Colonials	0	3	7	3	13

=== At Youngstown State ===
	1	2	3	4	Total
Colonials	0	0	0	0	0
No. 8 Penguins	6	7	3	14	30

=== VMI ===
	1	2	3	4	Total
Keydets	0	0	0	0	0
Colonials	14	0	6	3	23

=== At North Dakota State ===
	1	2	3	4	Total
Colonials	0	0	0	0	0
No. 2 Bison	35	14	7	0	56

=== At East Tennessee State ===
	1	2	3	4	Total
Colonials	0	0	0	3	3
Buccaneers	3	7	6	0	16

=== Duquesne ===
	1	2	3	4	Total
Dukes	7	27	7	10	51
Colonials	7	0	0	7	14

=== Sacred Heart ===
	1	2	3	4	Total
Pioneers	0	0	0	21	21
Colonials	0	6	0	8	14

=== At Saint Francis (PA) ===
	1	2	3	4	Total
Colonials	7	0	0	0	7
Red Flash	10	7	12	7	36

=== At Wagner ===
	1	2	3	4	Total
Colonials	0	0	0	7	7
Seahawks	13	7	7	0	27

=== Bryant ===
	1	2	3	4	Total
Bulldogs	0	14	7	21	42
Colonials	0	14	0	3	17

=== At Central Connecticut ===
	1	2	3	4	Total
Colonials	7	0	7	0	14
Blue Devils	7	21	7	7	42
