= 2021 Norfolk State Spartans football team =

American college football season

2021 Norfolk State Spartans football
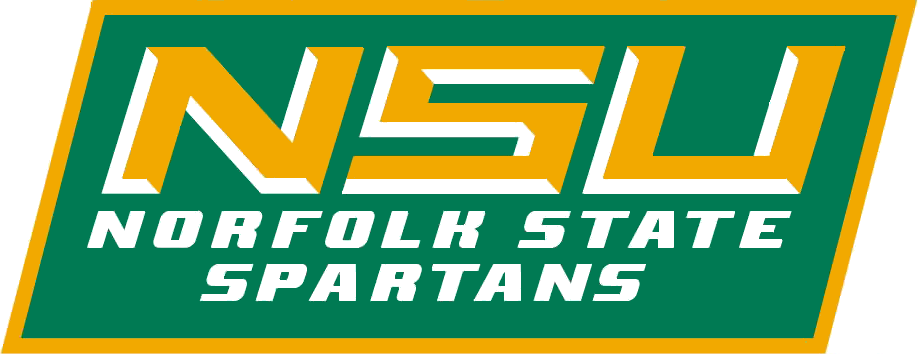
- Conference: Mid-Eastern Athletic Conference
- Record: 6–5 (2–3 MEAC)
- Head coach: Dawson Odums (1st season)
- Offensive coordinator: B. T. Sherman
- Defensive coordinator: Steve Adams (1st season)
- Home stadium: William "Dick" Price Stadium

2021 Mid-Eastern Athletic Conference football standings
	Conf.			Overall
Team	W		L	W		L
South Carolina State $	5	–	0	7	–	5
North Carolina Central	4	–	1	6	–	5
Delaware State	2	–	3	5	–	6
Norfolk State	2	–	3	6	–	5
Howard	1	–	4	3	–	8
Morgan State	1	–	4	2	–	9
$ – Conference champion

The 2021 Norfolk State Spartans football team represented Norfolk State University as a member of the Mid-Eastern Athletic Conference (MEAC) in the 2021 NCAA Division I FCS football season. The Spartans, led by first-year head coach Dawson Odums, played their home games at William "Dick" Price Stadium.

== Schedule ==
Date	Time	Opponent	Site	TV	Result	Attendance
September 4	7:00 p.m.	at Toledo*	Glass Bowl; Toledo, OH	ESPN3	L 10–49	21,783
September 11	12:00 p.m.	at Wake Forest*	Truist Field at Wake Forest; Winston-Salem, NC	ACCNX	L 16–41	21,896
September 18	6:00 p.m.	Elizabeth City State*	William "Dick" Price Stadium; Norfolk, VA		W 63–26	14,012
September 25	12:00 p.m.	at Saint Francis (PA)*	DeGol Field; Loretto, PA		W 28–16	1,234
October 2	2:00 p.m.	at Hampton*	Armstrong Stadium; Hampton, VA		W 47–44 (OT)	4,013
October 16	2:00 p.m.	Virginia–Lynchburg*	William "Dick" Price Stadium; Norfolk, VA	ESPN+	W 42–14	16,716
October 23	1:00 p.m.	at Howard	William H. Greene Stadium; Washington, D.C.	ESPN3	W 45–31	10,437
October 30	2:00 p.m.	Morgan State	William "Dick" Price Stadium; Norfolk, VA	ESPN+	W 31–20	6,112
November 6	2:00 p.m.	at North Carolina Central	O'Kelly–Riddick Stadium; Durham, NC	ESPN3	L 36–38 (2OT)	10,027
November 13	2:00 p.m.	at Delaware State	Alumni Stadium; Dover, DE	ESPN+	L 26–28	2,499
November 20	2:00 p.m.	South Carolina State	William "Dick" Price Stadium; Norfolk, VA	ESPN3	L 21–31	3,021
*Non-conference game; Rankings from STATS Poll released prior to the game; All times are in Eastern time
