= 2021 Bryant Bulldogs football team =

American college football season

2021 Bryant Bulldogs football
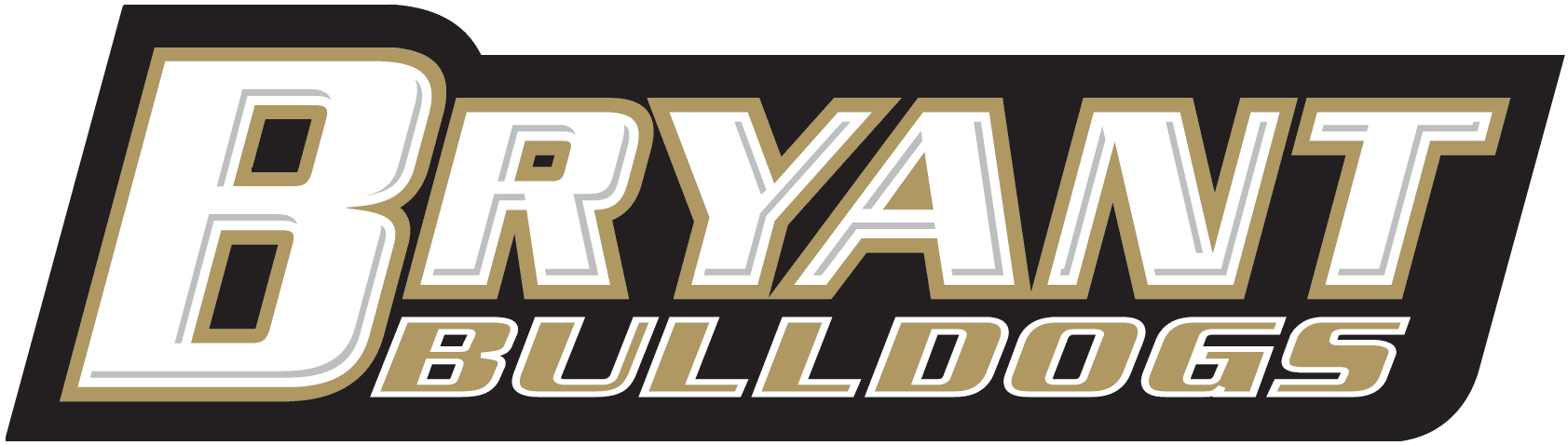
- Conference: Northeast Conference
- Record: 7–4 (5–2 NEC)
- Head coach: Chris Merritt (3rd season)
- Defensive coordinator: Anthony Barese (2nd season)
- Home stadium: Beirne Stadium

2021 Northeast Conference football standings
	Conf.			Overall
Team	W		L	W		L
Sacred Heart $^	6	–	1	8	–	4
Duquesne	5	–	2	7	–	3
Bryant	5	–	2	7	–	4
Central Connecticut	4	–	3	4	–	7
Saint Francis (PA)	4	–	3	5	–	6
Merrimack *	2	–	5	5	–	6
LIU	2	–	5	2	–	8
Wagner	0	–	7	0	–	11
$ – Conference champion; ^ – FCS playoff participant; Note: Merrimack ineligible for NEC title and FCS postseason play due to transition from NCAA Division II

The 2021 Bryant Bulldogs football team represented Bryant University as a member of the Northeast Conference (NEC) during the 2021 NCAA Division I FCS football season. Led by third-year head coach Chris Merritt, the Bulldogs compiled an overall record of 7–4 with a mark of 5–2 in conference play, tying for second place in the NEC. Bryant played home games at Beirne Stadium in Smithfield, Rhode Island.

== Schedule ==
Date	Time	Opponent	Site	TV	Result	Attendance
September 4	6:00 p.m.	at Rhode Island*	Meade Stadium; Kingston, RI	FCS	L 21–45	5,735
September 11	7:00 p.m.	Sacred Heart	Beirne Stadium; Smithfield, RI		W 17–6	2,276
September 18	3:30 p.m.	at Akron*	InfoCision Stadium–Summa Field; Akron, OH	ESPN3	L 14–35	8,779
September 25	6:00 p.m.	at Marist*	Tenney Stadium at Leonidoff Field; Poughkeepsie, NY	ESPN3	W 34–17	6,154
October 2	4:00 p.m.	Brown*	Beirne Stadium; Smithfield, RI		W 36–29	2,805
October 9	12:00 p.m.	at Duquesne	Arthur J. Rooney Athletic Field; Pittsburgh, PA		L 34–39	0
October 16	12:00 p.m.	Saint Francis (PA)	Beirne Stadium; Smithfield, RI		W 18–17	3,150
October 23	12:00 p.m.	at Wagner	Wagner College Stadium; Staten Island, NY		W 31–10	1,763
November 6	12:00 p.m.	at Central Connecticut	Arute Field; New Britain, CT	ESPN3	L 15–30	2,171
November 13	1:00 p.m.	LIU	Beirne Stadium; Smithfield, RI		W 52–7	3,300
November 20	1:00 p.m.	at Merrimack	Duane Stadium; North Andover, MA		W 58–14	2,318
*Non-conference game; Rankings from STATS Poll released prior to the game; All times are in Eastern time

== Game summaries ==
=== at Rhode Island ===
Game One – Rhode Island Rams (0–0) vs Bryant Bulldogs (0–0)

Quarter	1	2	3	4	Total
Bryant	7	7	7	0	21
Rhode Island	7	24	7	7	45

at Meade Stadium • Kingston, Rhode Island

- Date: Saturday, September 4, 2021
- Game time: 6:00 p.m. EST
- Game attendance: 5,735
- TV: FloSports

Game information

First quarter

- (11:03) URI – Justice Antrum 1 Yd Run, C.J. Carrick Kick (Rhode Island 7–0)
- (1:25) BRY – Daniel Adeboboye 1 Yd Run, Luke Samperi Kick (Tied 7–7)

Second quarter

- (8:48) URI – C.J. Carrick 33 Yd Field Goal (Rhode Island 10–7)
- (6:58) URI – Ivory Frimpong 17 Yd Pass, C.J. Carrick Kick (Rhode Island 17–7)
- (5:04) BRY – Landon Ruggieri 6 Yd Pass, Luke Samperi Kick (Rhode Island 17-14)
- (3:21) URI – Matt Pires 38 Yd Pass, C.J. Carrick Kick (Rhode Island 24–14)
- (0:32) URI – Justice Antrum 10 Yd Run, C.J. Carrick Kick (Rhode Island 31–14)

Third quarter

- (7:52) URI – Kasim Hill 1 Yd Run, C.J. Carrick Kick (Rhode Island 38–14)
- (1:22) BRY – Fabrice Mukendi 14 Yd Run, C.J. Carrick Kick (Rhode Island 38–21)

Fourth quarter

- (7:26) URI – Joey Kenny 20 Yd Pass, C.J. Carrick Kick (Rhode Island 45–21)

Statistics	BRY	URI
First downs	19	26
Plays–yards	63-262	68
Rushes–yards	115	235
Passing yards	147	273
Passing: comp–att–int	18-32-1	15-23-0
Time of possession	29:01	30:59

Team	Category	Player	Statistics
Bryant	Passing	Zevi Eckhaus	9/17, 55 yards
Bryant	Rushing	Daniel Adeboboye	17 carries, 68 yards, 1 TD
Bryant	Receiving	Gary Cooper	3 receptions, 39 yards
Rhode Island	Passing	Kasim Hill	12/18, 249 yards, 2 TD
Rhode Island	Rushing	Justice Antrum	18 carry, 96 yards, 2 TD
Rhode Island	Receiving	Paul Woods	2 receptions, 73 yards
