= 2017 Merrimack Warriors football team =

American college football season

2017 Merrimack Warriors football
- Conference: Northeast-10 Conference
- Record: 4–6 (4–5 NE-10)
- Head coach: Dan Curran (5th season)
- Defensive coordinator: Mike Gennetti (13th season)
- Home stadium: Martone–Mejail Field; Duane Stadium

2017 Northeast-10 Conference football standings
	Conf.			Overall
Team	W		L	W		L
No. 9 Assumption $^	8	–	1	11	–	2
LIU Post	7	–	2	8	–	2
Bentley	6	–	3	6	–	4
New Haven	5	–	4	6	–	4
Stonehill	5	–	4	6	–	4
Southern Connecticut	5	–	4	5	–	5
Merrimack	4	–	5	4	–	6
Pace	2	–	7	3	–	7
American International	2	–	7	2	–	8
Saint Anselm	1	–	8	1	–	9
$ – Conference champion; ^ – NCAA Division II playoff participant; Rankings from AFCA poll

The 2017 Merrimack Warriors football team represented Merrimack College as a member of the Northeast-10 Conference (NE-10) during the 2017 NCAA Division II football season. Led by fifth-year head coach Dan Curran, Merrimack compiled an overall record of 4–6 with a mark of 4–5 in conference play, placing seventh in the NE-10. The Warriors played their home games at Martone–Mejail Field until October, when Duane Stadium opened.

== Schedule ==
Date	Time	Opponent	Site	Result
September 2	3:00 p.m.	at Bryant*	Beirne Stadium; Smithfield, RI	L 41–49
September 9	12:00 p.m.	at American International	Ronald J. Abdow Field; Springfield, MA	W 31–21
September 16	1:00 p.m.	Bentley	Martone–Mejail Field; North Andover, MA	L 7–17
September 23	1:00 p.m.	at No. 24 Assumption	Multi-Sport Stadium; Worcester, MA	L 7–56
September 30	7:00 p.m.	Stonehill	Martone–Mejail Field; North Andover, MA	L 21–45
October 14	1:00 p.m.	Pace	Duane Stadium; North Andover, MA	W 44–10
October 21	3:00 p.m.	at Southern Connecticut State	Jess Dow Field; New Haven, CT	L 9–28
October 28	1:00 p.m.	Saint Anselm	Duane Stadium; North Andover, MA	W 41–3
November 4	12:00 p.m.	at LIU Post	Bethpage Federal Credit Union Stadium; Brookville, NY	L 7–49
November 11	12:00 p.m.	at New Haven	Ralph F. DellaCamera Stadium; West Haven, CT	W 31–21
*Non-conference game; Rankings from AFCA Poll released prior to the game; All times are in Eastern time
