= 2021 Wagner Seahawks football team =

American college football season

2021 Wagner Seahawks football
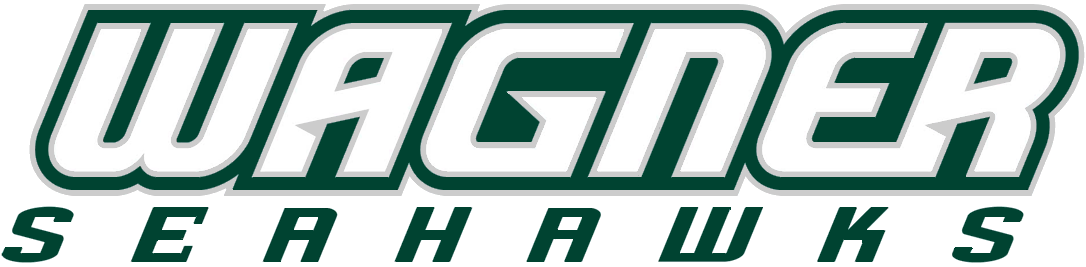
- Conference: Northeast Conference
- Record: 0–11 (0–7 NEC)
- Head coach: Tom Masella (2nd season)
- Offensive coordinator: Chris Nugai (2nd season)
- Home stadium: Wagner College Stadium

2021 Northeast Conference football standings
	Conf.			Overall
Team	W		L	W		L
Sacred Heart $^	6	–	1	8	–	4
Duquesne	5	–	2	7	–	3
Bryant	5	–	2	7	–	4
Central Connecticut	4	–	3	4	–	7
Saint Francis (PA)	4	–	3	5	–	6
Merrimack *	2	–	5	5	–	6
LIU	2	–	5	2	–	8
Wagner	0	–	7	0	–	11
$ – Conference champion; ^ – FCS playoff participant; Note: Merrimack ineligible for NEC title and FCS postseason play due to transition from NCAA Division II

The 2021 Wagner Seahawks football team represented Wagner College as a member of the Northeast Conference (NEC) in the 2021 NCAA Division I FCS football season. The Seahawks, led by second-year head coach Tom Masella, played their home games at Wagner College Stadium.

== Schedule ==
Date	Time	Opponent	Site	TV	Result	Attendance
September 2	7:00 p.m.	at Buffalo*	University at Buffalo Stadium; Amherst, NY	ESPN3	L 7–69	13,063
September 11	3:00 p.m.	Central Connecticut	Wagner College Stadium; Staten Island, NY		L 19–21	2,271
September 18	12:00 p.m.	at Saint Francis (PA)	DeGol Field; Loretto, PA		L 24–39	1,472
September 25	12:00 p.m.	at Temple*	Lincoln Financial Field; Philadelphia, PA	ESPN+	L 7–41	20,179
October 2	5:00 p.m.	Delaware State*	Wagner College Stadium; Staten Island, NY		L 27–33	2,512
October 9	1:00 p.m.	at Fordham*	Coffey Field; Bronx, NY	ESPN+	L 7–56	3,258
October 23	12:00 p.m.	Bryant	Wagner College Stadium; Staten Island, NY		L 10–31	1,763
October 30	1:00 p.m.	at LIU	Bethpage Federal Credit Union Stadium; Brookville, NY		L 14–28	655
November 6	12:00 p.m.	Merrimack	Wagner College Stadium; Staten Island, NY		L 26–35	1,607
November 13	12:00 p.m.	at Sacred Heart	Campus Field; Fairfield, CT		L 0–27	3,483
November 20	12:00 p.m.	Duquesne	Wagner College Stadium; Staten Island, NY		L 0–44	1,453
*Non-conference game; Rankings from STATS Poll released prior to the game; All times are in Eastern time
