= 2021 Morgan State Bears football team =

American college football season

2021 Morgan State Bears football
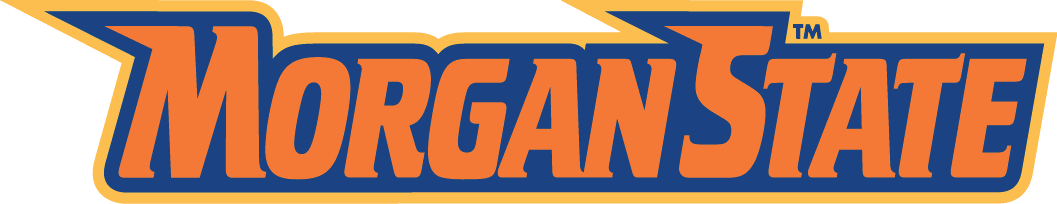
- Conference: Mid-Eastern Athletic Conference
- Record: 2–9 (1–4 MEAC)
- Head coach: Tyrone Wheatley (2nd season)
- Offensive coordinator: Josh Firm (1st season)
- Defensive coordinator: Antonio James (3rd season)
- Home stadium: Hughes Stadium

2021 Mid-Eastern Athletic Conference football standings
| | Conf. | | | Overall |
| Team | W | | L | W | | L |
|---|---|---|---|---|---|---|
| South Carolina State $ | 5 | – | 0 | 7 | – | 5 |
| North Carolina Central | 4 | – | 1 | 6 | – | 5 |
| Delaware State | 2 | – | 3 | 5 | – | 6 |
| Norfolk State | 2 | – | 3 | 6 | – | 5 |
| Howard | 1 | – | 4 | 3 | – | 8 |
| Morgan State | 1 | – | 4 | 2 | – | 9 |
$ – Conference champion

The 2021 Morgan State Bears Football Team represented Morgan State University as a member of the Mid-Eastern Athletic Conference (MEAC) in the 2021 NCAA Division I FCS football season. The Bears, led by second-year head coach Tyrone Wheatley, played their home games at Hughes Stadium.

== Schedule ==
| Date | Time | Opponent | Site | TV | Result | Attendance |
|---|---|---|---|---|---|---|
| September 4 | 4:00 p.m. | Towson* | Hughes Stadium; Baltimore, MD (The Battle for Greater Baltimore) | | L 0–31 | 8,035 |
| September 11 | 6:00 p.m. | at Tulane* | Legion Field; Birmingham, AL^{a} | ESPN+ | L 20–69 | 2,100 |
| September 18 | 1:00 p.m. | at Sacred Heart* | Campus Field; Fairfield, CT | | L 7–21 | 4,626 |
| October 2 | 12:00 p.m. | Saint Francis (PA)* | Hughes Stadium; Baltimore, MD | | L 14–27 | 2,017 |
| October 8 | 8:00 p.m. | at Howard | William H. Greene Stadium; Washington, D.C. (Rivalry) | ESPNU | L 0–27 | 8,632 |
| October 16 | 1:30 p.m. | at South Carolina State | Oliver C. Dawson Stadium; Orangeburg, SC | ESPN3 | L 14–37 | 11,000 |
| October 23 | 1:00 p.m. | North Carolina Central | Hughes Stadium; Baltimore, MD | ESPN+ | L 17–28 | 2,213 |
| October 30 | 2:00 p.m. | at Norfolk State | William "Dick" Price Stadium; Norfolk, VA | ESPN+ | L 20–31 | 6,112 |
| November 4 | 7:30 p.m. | Delaware State | Hughes Stadium; Baltimore, MD | ESPN2 | W 20–14 | 1,749 |
| November 13 | 1:00 p.m. | at Albany* | Bob Ford Field at Tom & Mary Casey Stadium; Albany, NY | | L 14–41 | 2,077 |
| November 20 | 12:00 p.m. | Georgetown* | Hughes Stadium; Baltimore, MD | ESPN+ | W 28–21 | 576 |
*Non-conference game; Rankings from STATS Poll released prior to the game; All times are in Eastern time

^a Originally scheduled to be played as an away game, the game against Tulane was moved to Birmingham, Alabama on September 2, 2021, due to safety concerns related to Hurricane Ida. Tulane remained the designated home team despite the neutral site.
