= Jonathan Gill (American football) =

American football player and coach

Playing career
- 2000–2003: Akron
- Position: Quarterback

Coaching career (HC unless noted)
- 2004–2011: LIU Post (QB)
- 2012–2020: LIU Post/LIU (QB/PGC)
- 2021: LIU (interim HC)

Head coaching record
- Overall: 2–8

Jonathan Gill is an American football coach and former player who was most recently the head coach of the LIU Sharks. He previously served as quarterbacks coach for seventeen seasons before being promoted to interim head coach upon the resignation of Bryan Collins.

A native of New York, Gill played college football as a quarterback for the University of Akron, but saw limited playing time. He returned to his home state in 2004, accepting a position as quarterbacks coach for the LIU Post Pioneers. In his second season, Gill helped Rob Blount earn the conference player of the year award. In 2009, Erik Anderwkavich received All-Pennsylvania State Athletic Conference honors under Gill. He was also given the position of passing game coordinator in 2012. He remained in that position until 2021, when he was promoted to head coach after Bryan Collins resigned. LIU started the season with a record of 0–5 before earning their first win against Central Connecticut on October 23.

== Head coaching record ==
| Year | Team | Overall | Conference | Standing | Bowl/playoffs |
|---|---|---|---|---|---|
LIU Sharks (Northeast Conference) (2021)
| 2021 | LIU | 2–8 | 2–5 | 7th | |
| LIU: | | 2–8 | 2–5 | | |
| Total: | | 2–8 | | | |
