= Dan Curran =

American football player and coach (born 1976)

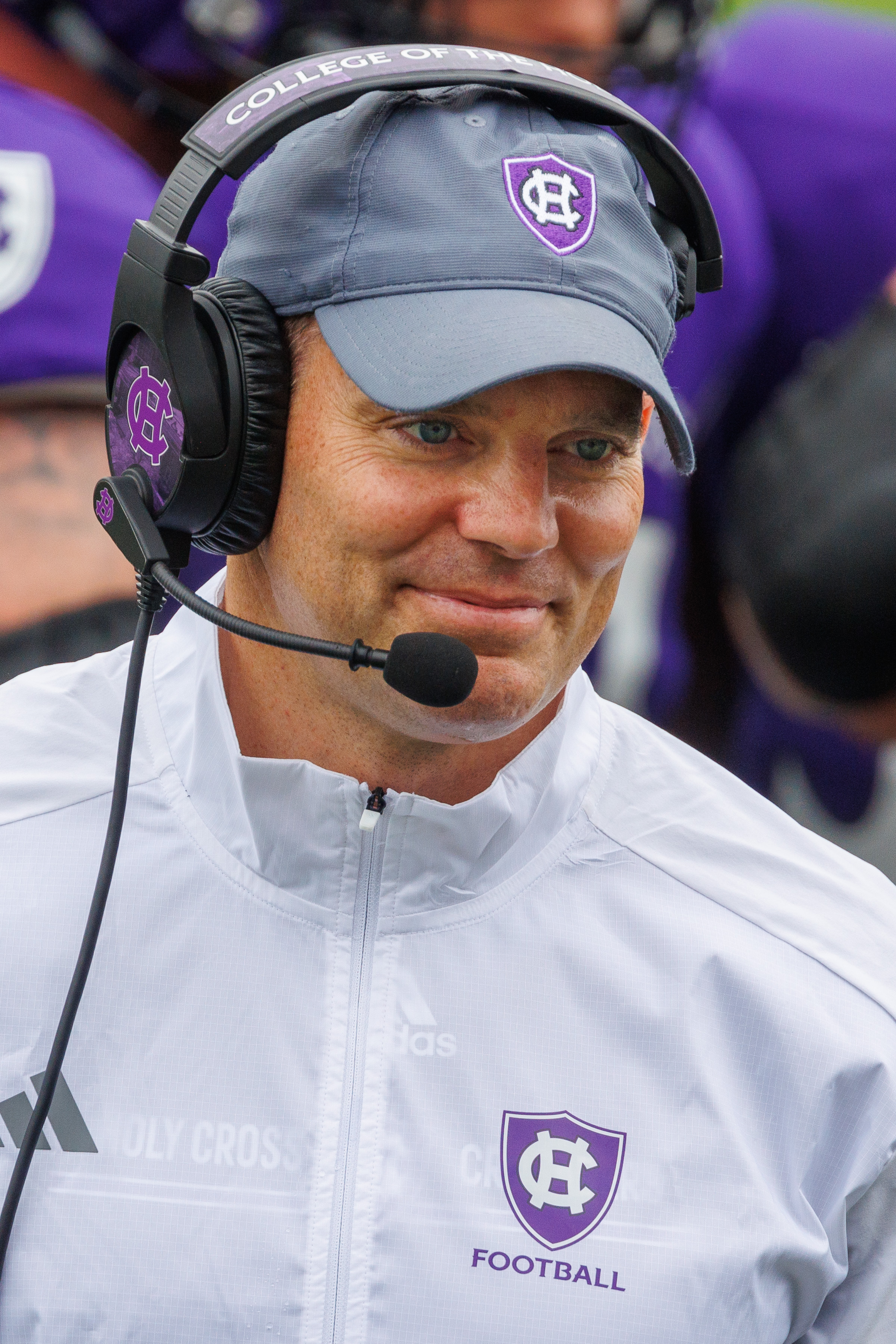

Current position
- Title: Head coach
- Team: Holy Cross
- Conference: Patriot
- Record: 16–20

Biographical details
- Born: October 28, 1976 (age 50); Chelmsford, Massachusetts, U.S.

Playing career
- 1997–2000: New Hampshire
- 2001: Nashville Kats
- 2002–2003: Georgia Force
- 2004: New Orleans VooDoo
- 2004: New Orleans Saints (Note: Offseason and/or practice squad member only)
- 2007: New Orleans VooDoo
- 2008–2009: Seattle Seahawks
- Positions: Fullback, linebacker

Coaching career (HC unless noted)
- 2010–2012: Merrimack (OC)
- 2013–2023: Merrimack
- 2024–present: Holy Cross

Head coaching record
- Overall: 69–78

Accomplishments and honors

Championships
- Patriot (2024)

Awards
- First-team All-Arena (2004); AFL All-Ironman Team (2004)

Dan Curran (born October 28, 1976) is an American football coach and former player. He is the head football coach for the College of the Holy Cross. Curran was previously head coach of the Merrimack football program. He was a fullback/linebacker in the Arena Football League (AFL).

== Early years ==
Curran was named Boston Globe Player of the Year. He also earned All American status in USA Today and was named the 6th best player in New England by Super Prep Magazine. He led Chelmsford High School to a Super Bowl victory over Brookline High School.

Curran attended the University of New Hampshire and played for Head Coach Sean McDonnell and Offensive Coordinator Chip Kelly earning Atlantic 10 honors his Senior year after rushing for 1,059 yards and scoring 16 touchdowns.

== Professional career ==
On December 28, 2000, Curran signed with the Nashville Kats of the Arena Football League (AFL) for the 2001 season. He was a fullback/linebacker during his time in the AFL as the league played under ironman rules. He was waived on April 9, 2001, and signed to the practice squad on April 12. Curran was promoted to the active roster on June 21, waived on July 4, signed to the practice squad again on July 9, and promoted to the active roster again on July 12, 2001. He only played in one game overall in 2001, rushing once for ten yards while also catching four passes for eight yards and one touchdown.

Curran signed with the Georgia Force for the 2002 AFL season. He played in 11 games in 2002 and 12 games in 2003. He missed some time due to injury both seasons.

On October 16, 2003, Curran was signed by the AFL's New Orleans VooDoo for the 2004 season. He played in all 16 games for the VooDoo in 2004, leading the league in rushing and becoming just the third player in league history at the time to rush for over 20 touchdowns. He earned first-team All-Arena and AFL All-Ironman Team honors for his performance during the 2004 season.

Curran signed with the New Orleans Saints of the National Football League (NFL) on July 8, 2004. He was later released by the Saints on August 30, 2004. He was re-activated by the VooDoo on October 18, 2004, but placed on the team's refused-to-report list on January 4, 2005. In October 2005, Curran was among 15 VooDoo players whose AFL rights were given to the upstart Kansas City Brigade after the VooDoo could not play the 2006 season due to Hurricane Katrina having damaged the New Orleans Arena. On January 12, 2006, the Brigade placed Curran on refused to report.

On March 20, 2006, the Brigade traded Curran and Abdul-Salam Noah to the Georgia Force for Gillis Wilson. However, Curran did not play for the Force in 2006 either. In October 2006, he signed with the VooDoo for the 2007 season. He appeared in seven games for the VooDoo in 2007, and also spent some time on injured reserve.

On August 30, 2007, Curran was traded to the Force again, this time for Mike Sutton. Curran signed with the NFL's Seattle Seahawks on January 8, 2008. He was released on July 18, 2008. He was re-activated by the Force on August 15, 2008, but the 2009 AFL season was later cancelled after the league folded. Curran signed with the Seahawks again on June 12, 2009, but was released again on August 30, 2009.

== Coaching career ==
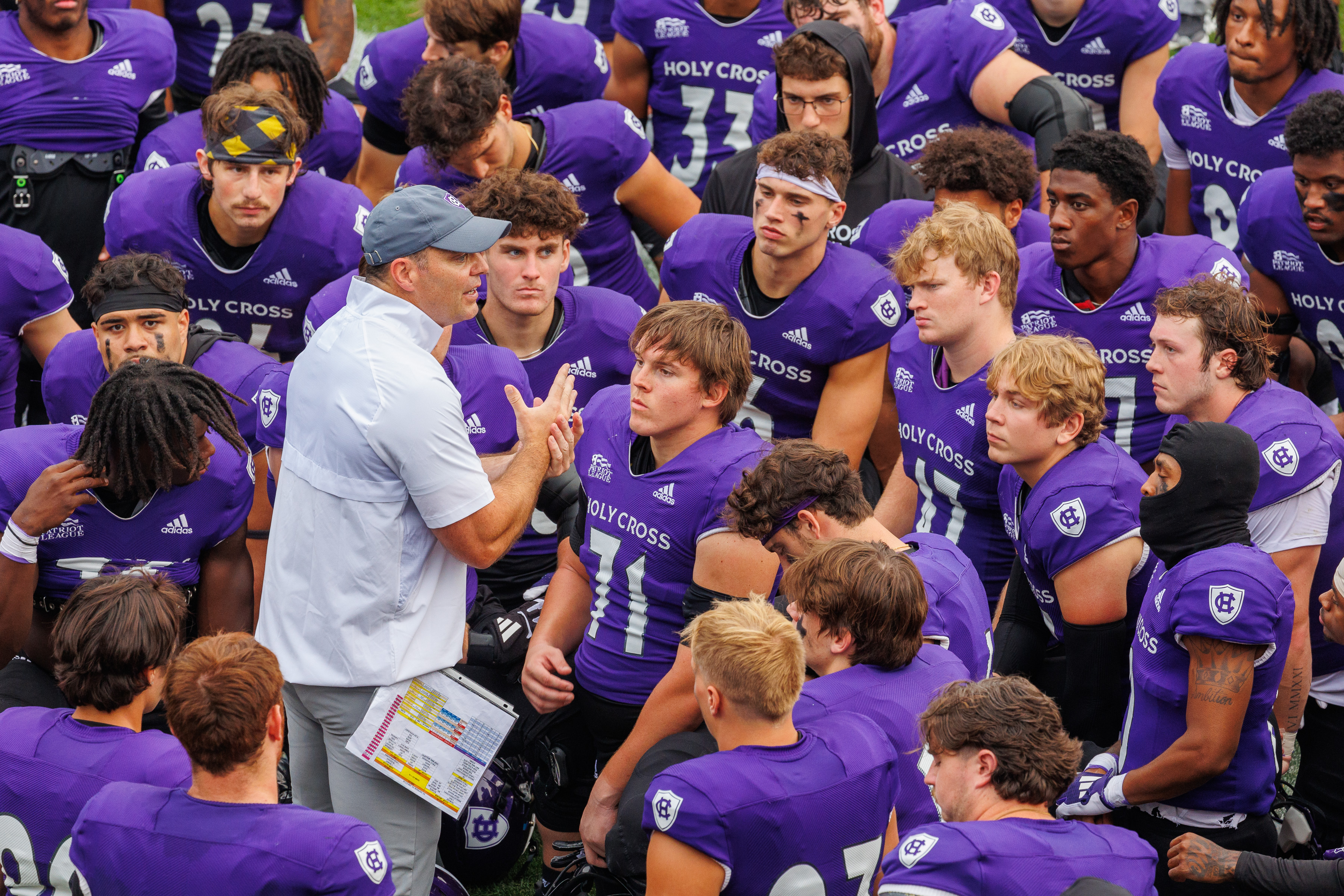
Curran with Holy Cross players in 2024

Curran was hired as the offensive coordinator of Merrimack College in 2010. After spending three seasons as the offensive coordinator of one of the top offenses in the country. Curran led was then hired as head coach in 2013, leading Merrimack to several marquee victories, including the program's first victory over a Division I opponent when it defeated reigning Northeast Conference champion and Division I FCS Tournament participant Wagner, as well as multiple wins over conference rival Bentley, two victories against conference power LIU Post, and the team's first-ever road win at the University of New Haven.

He and Merrimack then joined Division 1 FCS in 2019, where he led the team to a winning record in their first year. During the 2021 season Curran led the program to their first ever victory over a ranked FCS opponent, in a 35–21 victory over #24 Holy Cross. During the 2022 season the team tied a program record going 8–3 overall, however they lost the defacto NEC championship to Saint Francis 52–23. The following year they once again lost the defacto NEC championship to Duquesne 26–14.

He was then hired as head coach of Holy Cross prior to the 2024 season.

== Head coaching record ==
Year	Team	Overall	Conference	Standing	Bowl/playoffs
Merrimack Warriors (Northeast-10 Conference) (2013–2018)
2013	Merrimack	7–4	5–4	5th	
2014	Merrimack	4–7	4–5	T–6th	
2015	Merrimack	6–5	6–3	3rd	
2016	Merrimack	3–8	2–7	T–8th	
2017	Merrimack	4–6	4–5	7th	
2018	Merrimack	5–5	5–4	5th	
Merrimack Warriors (Northeast Conference) (2019–2023)
2019	Merrimack	6–5	0–0	NA	
2020–21	Merrimack	0–3	0–3	6th	
2021	Merrimack	5–6	2–5	T–6th	
2022	Merrimack	8–3	6–1	2nd	
2023	Merrimack	5–6	4–3	T–2nd	
Merrimack:		53–58	38–43		
Holy Cross Crusaders (Patriot League) (2024–present)
2024	Holy Cross	6–6	5–1	T–1st	
2025	Holy Cross	3–9	3–4	T–3rd	
2026	Holy Cross	7–5	7–2	2nd	
Holy Cross:		16–20	15–7		
Total:		69–78			
National championship Conference title Conference division title or championship game berth
