= Ryan McCarthy (American football) =

American football coach (born 1978/79)

Current position
- Title: Offensive coordinator/quarterbacks coach
- Team: Lamar
- Conference: SLC

Biographical details
- Born: 1978 or 1979 (age 47–48); Wilder, Vermont, U.S.
- Education: State University of New York College at Cortland (2002, bachelor's); University of Albany (2004, master's)

Playing career
- 1999–2002: Cortland
- Position: Quarterback

Coaching career (HC unless noted)
- 2003: Siena (QB)
- 2004–2014: Albany (OC/QB)
- 2015–2018: Central Connecticut (OC)
- 2019–2022: Central Connecticut
- 2023: Boston College (Special asst. to the HC)
- 2025–present: Lamar (OC/QB)

Head coaching record
- Overall: 17–18
- Bowls: 1-0
- Tournaments: 0–1 (NCAA D-I playoffs)

Accomplishments and honors

Championships
- 1 NEC (2019)

Ryan McCarthy is an American college football coach who is currently the offensive coordinator and quarterbacks coach at Lamar, positions he has held since 2025. He was the head football coach at Central Connecticut State University from 2019 to 2022.

== Early life ==
A native of Wilder, Vermont, McCarthy earned a B.S. in physical education at State University of New York at Cortland, where he played as a quarterback for the Cortland Red Dragons.

== Coaching career ==
McCarthy began his coaching career at Siena College in 2003. He then moved to the University at Albany, SUNY and served as assistant coach for 11 seasons. His teams led the Northeast Conference (NEC) in offense four times and set numerous offensive records under head coach Bob Ford. McCarthy moved to Central Connecticut State University and became the offensive coordinator under Pete Rossomando in 2015. When Rossomando left to join the staff at Rutgers, McCarthy was named head coach. In his first season as head coach he won the Northeast Conference and led his team to a 11–1 regular season record. The 2020 season was canceled, and then following 4–7 and 2–9 seasons in 2021 and 2022, McCarthy's contract was not renewed.

On March 17, 2025, McCarthy was hired as the offensive coordinator and quarterbacks coach at Lamar.

== Personal life ==
McCarthy and his wife, Jennifer, reside in Simsbury, Connecticut with their three sons.

== Head coaching record ==
Year	Team	Overall	Conference	Standing	Bowl/playoffs
Central Connecticut Blue Devils (Northeast Conference) (2019–2022)
2019	Central Connecticut	11–2	7–0	1st	L NCAA Division I First Round
2020–21	No team—COVID-19				
2021	Central Connecticut	4–7	4–3	T–4th	
2022	Central Connecticut	2–9	2–5	T–6th	
Central Connecticut:		17–18	13–8		
Total:		17–18			
National championship Conference title Conference division title or championship game berth
