= 2017 Wagner Seahawks football team =

American college football season

2017 Wagner Seahawks football
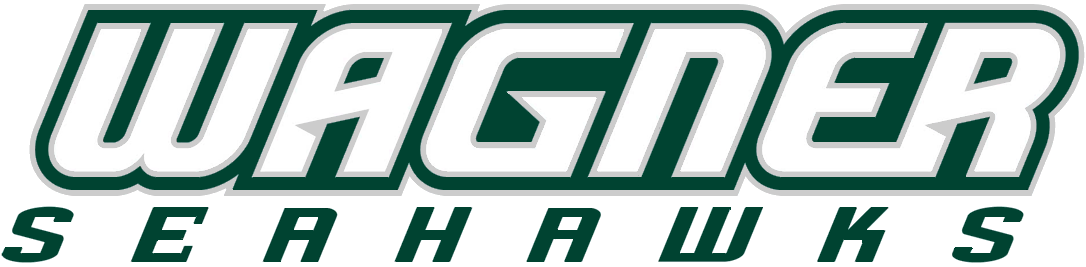
- Conference: Northeast Conference
- Record: 4–7 (2–4 NEC)
- Head coach: Jason Houghtaling (3rd season)
- Offensive coordinator: Rob Calabrese (1st season)
- Defensive coordinator: Tony Brinson (2nd season)
- Home stadium: Wagner College Stadium

2017 Northeast Conference football standings
	Conf.			Overall
Team	W		L	W		L
Central Connecticut $^	6	–	0	8	–	3
Duquesne	4	–	2	7	–	4
Bryant	4	–	2	6	–	5
Saint Francis (PA)	3	–	3	5	–	6
Sacred Heart	2	–	4	4	–	7
Wagner	2	–	4	4	–	7
Robert Morris	0	–	6	2	–	9
$ – Conference champion; ^ – FCS playoff participant

The 2017 Wagner Seahawks football team represented Wagner College in the 2017 NCAA Division I FCS football season as a member of the Northeast Conference (NEC). They were led by third-year head coach Jason Houghtaling and played their home games at Wagner College Stadium. Wagner finished the season 4–7 overall and 2–4 in NEC play to tie for fifth place.

== Schedule ==
Date	Time	Opponent	Site	TV	Result	Attendance
August 31	6:00 p.m.	Saint Anselm*	Wagner College Stadium; Staten Island, NY	NECFR	W 37–7	2,716
September 9	Noon	at Saint Francis (PA)	DeGol Field; Loretto, PA	ESPN3	L 6–31	1,231
September 16	1:00 p.m.	at Columbia*	Robert K. Kraft Field at Lawrence A. Wien Stadium; New York, NY	SNY	L 14–17	3,828
September 23	7:00 p.m.	at Western Michigan*	Waldo Stadium; Kalamazoo, MI	ESPN3	L 14–49	13,438
September 30	6:00 p.m.	Lehigh*	Wagner College Stadium; Staten Island, NY	NECFR	W 37–20	2,073
October 7	1:00 p.m.	at Duquesne	Arthur J. Rooney Athletic Field; Pittsburgh, PA	NECFR	L 0–38	2,743
October 14	6:00 p.m.	Central Connecticut^{†}	Wagner College Stadium; Staten Island, NY	NECFR	L 45–51 ^{4OT}	2,562
October 28	Noon	Bryant	Wagner College Stadium; Staten Island, NY	ESPN3	L 16–31	1,888
November 4	Noon	Robert Morris	Wagner College Stadium; Staten Island, NY	NECFR	W 27–7	1,803
November 11	1:00 p.m.	at No. 12 Stony Brook*	Kenneth P. LaValle Stadium; Stony Brook, NY	Wolfievision	L 10–38	5,471
November 18	Noon	at Sacred Heart	Campus Field; Fairfield, CT	NECFR	W 28–15	1,848
*Non-conference game; ^{†}Homecoming; Rankings from STATS Poll released prior to the game; All times are in Eastern time

== Game summaries ==
=== Saint Anselm ===
	1	2	3	4	Total
Hawks	0	0	0	7	7
Seahawks	0	13	17	7	37

=== At Saint Francis ===
	1	2	3	4	Total
Seahawks	3	3	0	0	6
Red Flash	7	7	7	10	31

=== At Columbia ===
	1	2	3	4	Total
Seahawks	0	0	7	7	14
Lions	0	14	0	3	17

=== At Western Michigan ===
	1	2	3	4	Total
Seahawks	0	7	0	7	14
Broncos	7	14	28	0	49

=== Lehigh ===
	1	2	3	4	Total
Mountain Hawks	7	7	6	0	20
Seahawks	7	10	14	6	37

=== At Duquesne ===
	1	2	3	4	Total
Seahawks	0	0	0	0	0
Dukes	7	14	7	10	38

=== Central Connecticut ===
	1	2	3	4	OT	2OT	3OT	4OT	Total
Blue Devils	10	17	0	0	7	3	8	6	51
Seahawks	0	14	3	10	7	3	8	0	45

=== Bryant ===
	1	2	3	4	Total
Bulldogs	10	7	7	7	31
Seahawks	3	0	13	0	16

=== Robert Morris ===
	1	2	3	4	Total
Colonials	0	0	0	7	7
Seahawks	13	7	7	0	27

=== At Stony Brook ===
	1	2	3	4	Total
Seahawks	10	0	0	0	10
No. 12 Seawolves	7	7	14	10	38

=== At Sacred Heart ===
	1	2	3	4	Total
Seahawks	14	0	14	0	28
Pioneers	0	9	0	6	15
