= 2021 Cal Poly Mustangs football team =

American college football season

2021 Cal Poly Mustangs football
- Conference: Big Sky Conference
- Record: 2–9 (1–7 Big Sky)
- Head coach: Beau Baldwin (2nd season)
- Offensive coordinator: Nick Edwards (2nd season)
- Offensive scheme: Multiple
- Defensive coordinator: J. C. Sherritt (2nd season)
- Base defense: 3–4
- Home stadium: Alex G. Spanos Stadium

2021 Big Sky Conference football standings
	Conf.			Overall
Team	W		L	W		L
No. 10 Sacramento State $^	8	–	0	9	–	3
No. 2 Montana State ^	7	–	1	11	–	3
No. 7 Eastern Washington ^	6	–	2	10	–	3
No. 6 Montana ^	6	–	2	10	–	3
No. 17 UC Davis ^	5	–	3	8	–	4
Weber State	5	–	3	6	–	5
Northern Arizona	4	–	4	5	–	6
Portland State	4	–	4	5	–	6
Idaho	3	–	5	4	–	7
Northern Colorado	2	–	6	3	–	8
Cal Poly	1	–	7	2	–	9
Idaho State	1	–	7	1	–	10
Southern Utah	0	–	8	1	–	10
$ – Conference champion; ^ – FCS playoff participant; Rankings from STATS Poll

The 2021 Cal Poly Mustangs football team represented California Polytechnic State University, San Luis Obispo as a member of the Big Sky Conference during the 2021 NCAA Division I FCS football season. Led by second-year head coach Beau Baldwin, the Mustangs compiled an overall record of 2–9 with a mark of 1–7 in conference play, tying for 11th place in the Big Sky. Cal poly played home games at Mustang Stadium in San Luis Obispo, California.

== Schedule ==
Date	Time	Opponent	Site	TV	Result	Attendance
September 4	2:05 p.m.	at San Diego*	Torero Stadium; San Diego, CA		W 28–17	2,966
September 11	7:05 p.m.	at Fresno State*	Bulldog Stadium; Fresno, CA	CW59	L 10–63	30,119
September 18	5:05 p.m.	South Dakota*	Alex G. Spanos Stadium; San Luis Obispo, CA	ESPN+	L 14–48	11,075
September 25	12:00 p.m.	at No. 4 Montana	Washington–Grizzly Stadium; Missoula, MT	ESPN+	L 7–39	25,600
October 2	5:05 p.m.	No. 19 Weber State^{†}	Alex G. Spanos Stadium; San Luis Obispo, CA	ESPN+	L 7–38	7,089
October 9	1:00 p.m.	at No. 10 Montana State	Bobcat Stadium; Bozeman, MT	RTNW	L 7–45	19,847
October 23	5:05 p.m.	No. 10 UC Davis	Alex G. Spanos Stadium; San Luis Obispo, CA (Battle for the Golden Horseshoe)	ESPN+	L 13–24	9,573
October 30	2:05 p.m.	at Portland State	Hillsboro Stadium; Hillsboro, OR	ESPN+	L 21–42	3,245
November 6	6:00 p.m.	at No. 16 Sacramento State	Hornet Stadium; Sacramento, CA	ESPN+	L 9–41	7,287
November 13	5:05 p.m.	Idaho State	Alex G. Spanos Stadium; San Luis Obispo, CA	ESPN+	W 32–29	5,651
November 20	5:05 p.m.	Northern Arizona	Alex G. Spanos Stadium; San Luis Obispo, CA	ESPN+	L 21–45	6,371
*Non-conference game; ^{†}Homecoming; Rankings from STATS Poll released prior to the game; All times are in Pacific time

== Preseason ==
=== Polls ===
On July 26, 2021, during the virtual Big Sky Kickoff, the Mustangs were predicted to finish twelfth in the Big Sky by the coaches and last in the media.

=== Preseason All–Big Sky team ===
The Mustangs did not have any players selected to the preseason all-Big Sky team.

== Game summaries ==
=== At San Diego ===
	1	2	3	4	Total
Mustangs	7	7	0	14	28
Toreros	7	0	3	7	17

=== At Fresno State ===
	1	2	3	4	Total
Mustangs	0	10	0	0	10
Bulldogs	7	28	21	7	63

=== South Dakota ===
	1	2	3	4	Total
Coyotes	21	20	0	7	48
Mustangs	7	0	0	7	14

=== At No. 4 Montana ===
	1	2	3	4	Total
Mustangs	0	0	0	7	7
No. 4 Grizzlies	15	3	21	0	39

=== No. 19 Weber State ===
	1	2	3	4	Total
No. 19 Wildcats	7	21	10	0	38
Mustangs	7	0	0	0	7

=== At No. 10 Montana State ===
	1	2	3	4	Total
Mustangs	0	0	7	0	7
No. 10 Bobcats	7	28	7	3	45

=== No. 10 UC Davis ===
	1	2	3	4	Total
No. 10 Aggies	0	10	14	0	24
Mustangs	0	7	6	0	13

=== At Portland State ===
	1	2	3	4	Total
Mustangs	6	0	8	7	21
Vikings	14	0	7	21	42

=== At No. 16 Sacramento State ===
	1	2	3	4	Total
Mustangs	0	9	0	0	9
No. 16 Hornets	14	10	10	7	41

=== Idaho State ===
	1	2	3	4	Total
Bengals	7	7	0	15	29
Mustangs	7	7	12	6	32

=== Northern Arizona ===
	1	2	3	4	Total
Lumberjacks	7	31	7	0	45
Mustangs	7	7	0	7	21
