= 2021 Idaho Vandals football team =

American college football season

2021 Idaho Vandals football
- Conference: Big Sky Conference
- Record: 4–7 (3–5 Big Sky)
- Head coach: Paul Petrino (9th season)
- Offensive coordinator: Brian Reader (1st season)
- Offensive scheme: Pro spread
- Defensive coordinator: Mike Breske (7th season)
- Base defense: Multiple 3–4
- Home stadium: Kibbie Dome

2021 Big Sky Conference football standings
| | Conf. | | | Overall |
| Team | W | | L | W | | L |
|---|---|---|---|---|---|---|
| No. 10 Sacramento State $^ | 8 | – | 0 | 9 | – | 3 |
| No. 2 Montana State ^ | 7 | – | 1 | 11 | – | 3 |
| No. 7 Eastern Washington ^ | 6 | – | 2 | 10 | – | 3 |
| No. 6 Montana ^ | 6 | – | 2 | 10 | – | 3 |
| No. 17 UC Davis ^ | 5 | – | 3 | 8 | – | 4 |
| Weber State | 5 | – | 3 | 6 | – | 5 |
| Northern Arizona | 4 | – | 4 | 5 | – | 6 |
| Portland State | 4 | – | 4 | 5 | – | 6 |
| Idaho | 3 | – | 5 | 4 | – | 7 |
| Northern Colorado | 2 | – | 6 | 3 | – | 8 |
| Cal Poly | 1 | – | 7 | 2 | – | 9 |
| Idaho State | 1 | – | 7 | 1 | – | 10 |
| Southern Utah | 0 | – | 8 | 1 | – | 10 |
$ – Conference champion; ^ – FCS playoff participant; Rankings from STATS Poll

The 2021 Idaho Vandals football team represented the University of Idaho in the Big Sky Conference during the 2021 NCAA Division I FCS football season. Led by ninth-year head coach Paul Petrino, the Vandals were 4–7 (3–5 in Big Sky, ninth), and played their home games on campus at the Kibbie Dome in Moscow, Idaho.

After the season, Petrino was fired with a cumulative record of 34–66 (.340); the 66 losses were the most in program history, fifteen more than Skip Stahley (1954–61).

== Preseason ==
=== Polls ===
On July 26, 2021, during the virtual Big Sky Kickoff, the Vandals were predicted to finish eighth in the Big Sky by both the coaches and media.

=== Preseason All–Big Sky team ===
The Vandals had two players selected to the preseason all-Big Sky team.

Offense

Logan Kendall – FB

Defense

Tre Walker – MLB

== Schedule ==
| Date | Time | Opponent | Site | TV | Result | Attendance |
|---|---|---|---|---|---|---|
| September 4 | 1:00 p.m. | Simon Fraser* | Kibbie Dome; Moscow, ID | SWX/ESPN+ | W 68–0 | 5,214 |
| September 11 | 4:30 p.m. | at Indiana* | Memorial Stadium; Bloomington, IN | BTN | L 14–56 | 47,417 |
| September 18 | 12:30 p.m. | at Oregon State* | Reser Stadium; Corvallis, OR | P12N | L 0–42 | 26,797 |
| October 2 | 7:00 p.m. | at No. 8 UC Davis | UC Davis Health Stadium; Davis, CA | ESPN+ | L 20–27 | 11,622 |
| October 9 | 2:00 p.m. | Portland State^{†} | Kibbie Dome; Moscow, ID | SWX/ESPN+ | W 42–35 | 7,034 |
| October 16 | 11:30 a.m. | at No. 2 Eastern Washington | Roos Field; Cheney, WA | RTNW | L 21–71 | 5,380 |
| October 23 | 4:30 p.m. | No. 11 Montana | Kibbie Dome; Moscow, ID (Little Brown Stein) | SWX/ESPN+ | L 14–34 | 6,059 |
| October 30 | 1:00 p.m. | Northern Arizona | Kibbie Dome; Moscow, ID | SWX/ESPN+ | L 31–38 | 3,000 |
| November 6 | 1:00 p.m. | Southern Utah | Kibbie Dome; Moscow, ID | ESPN+ | W 42–24 | 6,082 |
| November 13 | 12:00 p.m. | at No. 3 Montana State | Bobcat Stadium; Bozeman, MT | SWX/ESPN+ | L 13–20 | 19,447 |
| November 20 | 12:00 p.m. | at Idaho State | Holt Arena; Pocatello, ID (rivalry) | ESPN+ | W 14–0 | |
*Non-conference game; ^{†}Homecoming; Rankings from STATS Poll released prior to the game; All times are in Pacific time

== Game summaries ==
=== Simon Fraser ===
Simon Fraser Red Leafs (0–0) at Idaho Vandals (0–0) – Game summary

| Quarter | 1 | 2 | 3 | 4 | Total |
|---|---|---|---|---|---|
| Simon Fraser | 0 | 0 | 0 | 0 | 0 |
| Vandals | 21 | 19 | 21 | 7 | 68 |

at Kibbie Dome, Moscow, Idaho

- Date: September 4
- Game time: 1:00 p.m. PDT
- Game weather: None (played indoors)
- Game attendance: 5,214
- Referee: Jeff Rink
- TV: ESPN+

Game information
First quarter
- IDHO – C. J. Jordan 21-yard run (Logan Prescott kick), 13:21. Vandals 7–0. Drive: 6 plays, 53 yards, 1:37.
- IDHO – Roshaun Johnson 6-yard run (Logan Prescott kick), 4:04. Vandals 14–0. Drive: 4 plays, 67 yards, 1:39.
- IDHO – Elisha Cummings 6-yard run (Logan Prescott kick), 0:02. Vandals 21–0. Drive: 6 plays, 66 yards, 2:12.

Second quarter

- IDHO – Sam Davenport tackled in end zone, 13:02. Vandals 23–0.
- IDHO – Roshaun Johnson 37-yard run (Logan Prescott kick), 12:19. Vandals 30–0. Drive: 2 plays, 40 yards, 0:36.
- IDHO – Logan Prescott 21-yard field goal, 8:47. Vandals 33–0. Drive: 5 plays, 42 yards, 1:08.
- IDHO – Roshaun Johnson 4-yard run (Logan Prescott kick), 0:38. Vandals 40–0. Drive: 8 plays, 31 yards, 2:40.

Third quarter

- IDHO – Connor Whitney 4-yard pass from C. J. Jordan (Logan Prescott kick), 10:21. Vandals 47–0. Drive: 8 plays, 44 yards, 3:01.
- IDHO – Aundre Carter 1-yard run (Logan Prescott kick), 6:24. Vandals 54–0. Drive: 6 plays, 21 yards, 3:13.
- IDHO – Hayden Hatten 71-yard pass from C. J. Jordan (Logan Prescott kick), 1:30. Vandals 61–0. Drive: 1 play, 71 yards, 0:11.

Fourth quarter

- IDHO – Khalil Forehand 8-yard run (Logan Prescott kick), 8:12. Vandals 68–0. Drive: 7 plays, 58 yards, 3:00.

| Statistics | SFU | IDHO |
|---|---|---|
| First downs | 9 | 30 |
| Total yards | 127 | 593 |
| Rushing yards | 50 | 316 |
| Passing yards | 77 | 277 |
| Turnovers | 1 | 2 |
| Time of possession | 32:55 | 27:03 |

| Team | Category | Player | Statistics |
|---|---|---|---|
| Simon Fraser | Passing | Brandon Niksich | 9/16, 77 yards, INT |
| Simon Fraser | Rushing | Mason Glover | 16 rushes, 34 yards |
| Simon Fraser | Receiving | Dallas Dixon | 4 receptions, 37 yards |
| Idaho | Passing | C. J. Jordan | 7/12, 161 yards, 2 TD |
| Idaho | Rushing | Roshaun Johnson | 10 rushes, 87 yards, 3 TD |
| Idaho | Receiving | Hayden Hatten | 2 receptions, 106 yards, TD |

=== At Indiana ===
Idaho Vandals (1–0) vs Indiana Hoosiers (0–1) – Game summary

| Quarter | 1 | 2 | 3 | 4 | Total |
|---|---|---|---|---|---|
| Vandals | 0 | 7 | 7 | 0 | 14 |
| Hoosiers | 21 | 14 | 7 | 14 | 56 |

at Memorial Stadium • Bloomington, IN

- Date: September 11, 2021
- Game time: 7:40 p.m.
- Game weather: Sunny, 75 °F (24 °C)
- Game attendance: 47,417
- Referee: Mark Klucyznski
- TV announcers (BTN): Mark Followill (play-by-play), Matt Millen (analyst)
- Sources: IUHoosiers.com

Game information

First quarter

- (4:27) IU – Stephen Carr 2-yard run, Charles Campbell kick (Drive: 18 plays, 75 yards, 8:33; Indiana 7–0)
- (3:01) IU – Javon Swinton 9-yard pass from Michael Penix Jr., Charles Campbell kick (Drive: 2 plays, 13 yards, 0:39; Indiana 14–0)
- (2:02) IU – Javon Swinton 4-yard blocked punt return, Charles Campbell kick (Drive: 3 plays, -1 yards, 0:54; Indiana 21–0)

Second quarter

- (3:39) IU – Ty Fryfogle 9-yard pass from Michael Penix Jr., Charles Campbell kick (Drive: 12 plays, 83 yards, 6:32; Indiana 28–0)
- (1:49) IU – D. J. Matthews 81-yard punt return, Charles Campbell kick (Drive: 3 plays, -9 yards, 1:47; Indiana 35–0)
- (0:26) IDHO – Hayden Hatten 16-yard pass from Mike Beaudry, Logan Prescott kick (Drive: 8 plays, 75 yards, 1:21; Indiana 35–7)

Third quarter

- (13:14) IU – Michael Penix Jr. 1-yard run, Charles Campbell kick (Drive: 4 plays, 28 yards, 1:32; Indiana 42–7)
- (9:09) IDHO – Hayden Hatten 23-yard pass from Mike Beaudry, Logan Prescott kick (Drive: 11 plays, 75 yards, 4:03; Indiana 42–14)

Fourth quarter

- (13:02) IU – A. J. Barner 76-yard pass from Jack Tuttle, Chris Freeman kick (Drive: 4 plays, 88 yards, 1:34; Indiana 49–14)
- (9:56) IU – Davion Ervin-Poindexter 4-yard run, Chris Freeman kick (Drive: 4 plays, 32 yards, 1:11; Indiana 56–14)

| Statistics | IDHO | IU |
|---|---|---|
| First downs | 13 | 20 |
| Total yards | 261 | 338 |
| Rushes/yards | 22–65 | 50–179 |
| Passing yards | 196 | 159 |
| Passing: Comp–Att–Int | 23–39–0 | 13–20–0 |
| Time of possession | 26:36 | 33:24 |

| Team | Category | Player | Statistics |
|---|---|---|---|
| Idaho | Passing | Mike Beaudry | 23/36, 196 yards, 2 TD |
| Idaho | Rushing | Nick Romano | 4 carries, 20 yards |
| Idaho | Receiving | Hayden Hatten | 10 receptions, 94 yards, 2 TD |
| Indiana | Passing | Jack Tuttle | 2/4, 91 yards, TD |
| Indiana | Rushing | Stephen Carr | 22 carries, 118 yards, TD |
| Indiana | Receiving | A. J. Barner | 1 reception, 76 yards, TD |

=== At Oregon State ===
Idaho Vandals vs Oregon State Beavers – Game summary

| Quarter | 1 | 2 | 3 | 4 | Total |
|---|---|---|---|---|---|
| Vandals | 0 | 0 | 0 | 0 | 0 |
| Beavers | 14 | 14 | 14 | 0 | 42 |

at Reser Stadium • Corvallis, OR

- Date: September 18, 2021
- Game time: 12:30 p.m. PDT
- Game weather: 61 °F (16 °C); Rain
- Game attendance: 26,797
- Referee: Michael Mothershed
- TV announcers (P12N): Rich Burk (play-by-play), Nigel Burton (analyst)

Game information

First quarter

- OSU – Tyjon Lindsey 18 Yd pass from Chance Nolan (Everett Hayes Kick), 7:47. Oregon State 7–0. Drive: 8 plays, 69 yards, 3:42.
- OSU – B. J. Baylor 4 Yd Run (Everett Hayes Kick), 1:36. Oregon State 14–0. Drive: 8 plays, 61 yards, 4:13.

Second quarter

- OSU – Deshaun Fenwick 9 Yd Run (Everett Hayes Kick), 11:05. Oregon State 21–0. Drive: 5 plays, 58 yards, 2:37.
- OSU – Teagan Quitoriano 2 Yd pass from Chance Nolan (Everett Hayes Kick), 1:16. Oregon State 28–0. Drive: 9 plays, 67 yards, 4:55.

Third quarter

- OSU – Champ Flemings 30 Yd pass from Chance Nolan (Everett Hayes Kick), 10:51. Oregon State 35–0. Drive: 8 plays, 75 yards, 4:09.
- OSU – B. J. Baylor 2 Yd Run (Everett Hayes Kick), 5:39. Oregon State 42–0. Drive: 8 plays, 63 yards, 3:15.

Fourth quarter

- None

Top passers

- IDA – Mike Beaudry – 6/9, 47 yards
- OSU – Chance Nolan – 14/19, 175 yards, 3 TD

Top rushers

- IDA – C. J. Jordan – 14 rushes, 55 yards
- OSU – B. J. Baylor – 11 rushes, 69 yards, 2 TD

Top receivers

- IDA – Terez Traynor – 5 receptions, 38 yards
- OSU – Luke Musgrave – 3 receptions, 40 yards

=== At No. 8 UC Davis ===
| | 1 | 2 | 3 | 4 | Total |
|---|---|---|---|---|---|
| Vandals | 6 | 7 | 7 | 0 | 20 |
| No. 8 Aggies | 3 | 10 | 0 | 14 | 27 |

=== Portland State ===
| | 1 | 2 | 3 | 4 | Total |
|---|---|---|---|---|---|
| Vikings | 7 | 7 | 0 | 21 | 35 |
| Vandals | 21 | 14 | 0 | 7 | 42 |

=== At No. 2 Eastern Washington ===
| | 1 | 2 | 3 | 4 | Total |
|---|---|---|---|---|---|
| Vandals | 7 | 7 | 0 | 7 | 21 |
| No. 2 Eagles | 29 | 14 | 14 | 14 | 71 |

=== No. 11 Montana ===
| | 1 | 2 | 3 | 4 | Total |
|---|---|---|---|---|---|
| No. 11 Grizzlies | 7 | 13 | 7 | 7 | 34 |
| Vandals | 7 | 0 | 0 | 7 | 14 |

=== Northern Arizona ===
| | 1 | 2 | 3 | 4 | Total |
|---|---|---|---|---|---|
| Lumberjacks | 14 | 3 | 14 | 7 | 38 |
| Vandals | 7 | 14 | 0 | 10 | 31 |

=== Southern Utah ===
| | 1 | 2 | 3 | 4 | Total |
|---|---|---|---|---|---|
| Thunderbirds | 7 | 3 | 7 | 7 | 24 |
| Vandals | 14 | 14 | 7 | 7 | 42 |

=== At No. 3 Montana State ===
| | 1 | 2 | 3 | 4 | Total |
|---|---|---|---|---|---|
| Vandals | 0 | 10 | 3 | 0 | 13 |
| No. 3 Bobcats | 7 | 6 | 0 | 7 | 20 |

=== At Idaho State ===
| | 1 | 2 | 3 | 4 | Total |
|---|---|---|---|---|---|
| Vandals | 14 | 0 | 0 | 0 | 14 |
| Bengals | 0 | 0 | 0 | 0 | 0 |
