= 2021 Idaho State Bengals football team =

American college football season

2021 Idaho State Bengals football
- Conference: Big Sky Conference
- Record: 1–10 (1–7 Big Sky)
- Head coach: Rob Phenicie (5th season)
- Offensive coordinator: Mike Ferriter (4th season)
- Defensive coordinator: Roger Cooper (7th season)
- Home stadium: Holt Arena

2021 Big Sky Conference football standings
	Conf.			Overall
Team	W		L	W		L
No. 10 Sacramento State $^	8	–	0	9	–	3
No. 2 Montana State ^	7	–	1	11	–	3
No. 7 Eastern Washington ^	6	–	2	10	–	3
No. 6 Montana ^	6	–	2	10	–	3
No. 17 UC Davis ^	5	–	3	8	–	4
Weber State	5	–	3	6	–	5
Northern Arizona	4	–	4	5	–	6
Portland State	4	–	4	5	–	6
Idaho	3	–	5	4	–	7
Northern Colorado	2	–	6	3	–	8
Cal Poly	1	–	7	2	–	9
Idaho State	1	–	7	1	–	10
Southern Utah	0	–	8	1	–	10
$ – Conference champion; ^ – FCS playoff participant; Rankings from STATS Poll

The 2021 Idaho State Bengals football team represented Idaho State University in the Big Sky Conference during the 2021 NCAA Division I FCS football season. Led by fifth-year head coach Rob Phenicie, the Bengals finished at 1–10 (1–7 in Big Sky, twelfth) and played their home games on campus at Holt Arena in Pocatello, Idaho.

After being shut out at home by intrastate rival Idaho in the season finale on November 20, Phenicie was fired with a cumulative record of 16–35 (.314).

== Preseason ==
=== Polls ===
On July 26, 2021, during the virtual Big Sky Kickoff, the Bengals were predicted to finish ninth in the Big Sky by both the coaches and media.

=== Preseason All–Big Sky team ===
The Bengals had one player selected to the preseason all-Big Sky team.

Offense

Tanner Conner – WR

== Schedule ==
Date	Time	Opponent	Site	TV	Result	Attendance
September 4	1:00 p.m.	No. 8 North Dakota*	Holt Arena; Pocatello, ID	ESPN+	L 14–35	4,667
September 11	8:30 p.m.	at Nevada*	Mackay Stadium; Reno, NV	Stadium	L 10–49	23,965
September 25	1:00 p.m.	Sacramento State	Holt Arena; Pocatello, ID	ESPN+	L 21–23	5,997
October 2	2:00 p.m.	at Northern Arizona	Walkup Skydome; Flagstaff, AZ	ESPN+	L 17–48	9,713
October 9	1:00 p.m.	No. 7 UC Davis	Holt Arena; Pocatello, ID	ESPN+	W 27–17	5,206
October 16	3:05 p.m.	at Portland State	Hillsboro Stadium; Hillsboro, OR	ESPN+	L 10–31	1,809
October 23	1:00 p.m.	at No. 8 Montana State	Bobcat Stadium; Bozeman, MT	SWX/ESPN+	L 9–27	19,297
October 30	1:00 p.m.	No. 23 Weber State	Holt Arena; Pocatello, ID	ESPN+	L 17–40	2,500
November 6	1:30 p.m.	at No. 15 (FBS) BYU*	LaVell Edwards Stadium; Provo, UT	BYUtv/ESPN3	L 14–59	63,470
November 13	6:05 p.m.	at Cal Poly	Alex G. Spanos Stadium; San Luis Obispo, CA	ESPN+	L 29–32	5,651
November 20	1:00 p.m.	Idaho	Holt Arena; Pocatello, ID (rivalry)	ESPN+	L 0–14	
*Non-conference game; Rankings from STATS Poll released prior to the game; All times are in Mountain time

== Game summaries ==
=== No. 8 North Dakota ===
	1	2	3	4	Total
No. 8 Fighting Hawks	7	3	14	11	35
Bengals	0	7	0	7	14

=== At Nevada ===
	1	2	3	4	Total
Bengals	7	0	3	0	10
Wolf Pack	14	7	7	21	49

=== Sacramento State ===
	1	2	3	4	Total
Hornets	7	7	6	3	23
Bengals	7	14	0	0	21

=== At Northern Arizona ===
	1	2	3	4	Total
Bengals	7	0	3	7	17
Lumberjacks	3	20	15	10	48

=== No. 7 UC Davis ===
	1	2	3	4	Total
No. 7 Aggies	0	3	0	14	17
Bengals	14	10	0	3	27

=== At Portland State ===
	1	2	3	4	Total
Bengals	0	7	0	3	10
Vikings	17	7	7	0	31

=== At No. 8 Montana State ===
	1	2	3	4	Total
Bengals	3	0	3	3	9
No. 8 Bobcats	0	10	3	14	27

=== No. 23 Weber State ===
	1	2	3	4	Total
No. 23 Wildcats	10	7	10	13	40
Bengals	0	10	7	0	17

=== At No. 15 (FBS) BYU ===
	1	2	3	4	Total
Bengals	0	7	7	0	14
No. 15 (FBS) Cougars	21	21	7	10	59

=== At Cal Poly ===
	1	2	3	4	Total
Bengals	7	7	0	15	29
Mustangs	7	7	12	6	32

=== Idaho ===
	1	2	3	4	Total
Vandals	14	0	0	0	14
Bengals	0	0	0	0	0
