= 2021 Southern Utah Thunderbirds football team =

American college football season

2021 Southern Utah Thunderbirds football
- Conference: Big Sky Conference
- Record: 1–10 (0–8 Big Sky)
- Head coach: Demario Warren (6th season)
- Offensive coordinator: Matt Wade (2nd season)
- Defensive coordinator: Robert Bala (2nd season)
- Home stadium: Eccles Coliseum

2021 Big Sky Conference football standings
	Conf.			Overall
Team	W		L	W		L
No. 10 Sacramento State $^	8	–	0	9	–	3
No. 2 Montana State ^	7	–	1	11	–	3
No. 7 Eastern Washington ^	6	–	2	10	–	3
No. 6 Montana ^	6	–	2	10	–	3
No. 17 UC Davis ^	5	–	3	8	–	4
Weber State	5	–	3	6	–	5
Northern Arizona	4	–	4	5	–	6
Portland State	4	–	4	5	–	6
Idaho	3	–	5	4	–	7
Northern Colorado	2	–	6	3	–	8
Cal Poly	1	–	7	2	–	9
Idaho State	1	–	7	1	–	10
Southern Utah	0	–	8	1	–	10
$ – Conference champion; ^ – FCS playoff participant; Rankings from STATS Poll

The 2021 Southern Utah Thunderbirds football team represented Southern Utah University in the 2021 NCAA Division I FCS football season. They were led by sixth-year head coach Demario Warren and played their home games at Eccles Coliseum in Cedar City, Utah. They played their final season as a member of the Big Sky Conference, as they would depart for the Western Athletic Conference for the 2022 season.

== Preseason ==
=== Polls ===
On July 26, 2021, during the virtual Big Sky Kickoff, the Thundebirds were predicted to finish eleventh in the Big Sky by both the coaches and media.

=== Preseason All–Big Sky team ===
The Thunderbirds had one player selected to the preseason all-Big Sky team.

Defense

La'akea Kaho'ohanohano-Davis – OL

== Schedule ==
Date	Time	Opponent	Site	TV	Result	Attendance
August 28	8:00 p.m.	at San Jose State*	CEFCU Stadium; San Jose, CA	CBSSN	L 14–45	16,204
September 2	8:30 p.m.	at No. 25 (FBS) Arizona State*	Sun Devil Stadium; Tempe, AZ	P12N	L 14–41	44,456
September 18	5:00 p.m.	vs. Tarleton State*	Globe Life Park; Arlington, TX	ESPN+	W 40–35	8,346
September 25	6:00 p.m.	No. 6 Eastern Washington	Eccles Coliseum; Cedar City, UT		L 21–50	7,096
October 2	6:00 p.m.	Portland State	Eccles Coliseum; Cedar City, UT		L 13–20	4,013
October 9	7:00 p.m.	at Sacramento State	Hornet Stadium; Sacramento, CA	ESPN+	L 20–41	6,244
October 16	2:00 p.m.	at Northern Arizona	Walkup Skydome; Flagstaff, AZ (Grand Canyon Rivalry)		L 35–59	7,511
October 23	6:00 p.m.	Northern Colorado	Eccles Coliseum; Cedar City, UT	ESPN+	L 9–17	3,208
October 30	12:00 p.m.	at No. 11 Montana	Washington–Grizzly Stadium; Missoula, MT	RTRM	L 19–20	22,587
November 6	2:00 p.m.	at Idaho	Kibbie Dome; Moscow, ID	ESPN+	L 24–42	6,082
November 13	2:00 p.m.	Weber State	Eccles Coliseum; Cedar City, UT (Beehive Bowl)	ESPN+	L 0–62	4,045
*Non-conference game; Rankings from STATS Poll released prior to the game; All times are in Mountain time

Conference opponents not played this season: Cal Poly, Idaho State, Montana State, UC Davis

== Game summaries ==
=== At San Jose State ===
	1	2	3	4	Total
Thunderbirds	0	14	0	0	14
Spartans	21	17	7	0	45

=== At No. 25 (FBS) Arizona State ===
	1	2	3	4	Total
Thunderbirds	7	0	7	0	14
No. 25 (FBS) Sun Devils	13	15	6	7	41

=== Vs. Tarleton State ===
	1	2	3	4	Total
Thunderbirds	14	14	6	6	40
Texans	7	21	0	7	35

=== No. 6 Eastern Washington ===
	1	2	3	4	Total
No. 6 Eagles	9	21	13	7	50
Thunderbirds	7	7	7	0	21

=== Portland State ===
	1	2	3	4	Total
Vikings	0	10	3	7	20
Thunderbirds	3	7	3	0	13

=== At Sacramento State ===
	1	2	3	4	Total
Thunderbirds	0	7	6	7	20
Hornets	17	7	7	10	41

=== At Northern Arizona ===
	1	2	3	4	Total
Thunderbirds	0	14	14	7	35
Lumberjacks	17	14	14	14	59

=== Northern Colorado ===
	1	2	3	4	Total
Bears	7	3	0	7	17
Thunderbirds	3	0	3	3	9

=== At No. 11 Montana ===
	1	2	3	4	Total
Thunderbirds	3	13	3	0	19
Grizzlies	0	10	7	3	20

=== At Idaho ===
	1	2	3	4	Total
Thunderbirds	7	3	7	7	24
Vandals	14	14	7	7	42

=== Weber State ===
	1	2	3	4	Total
Wildcats	14	31	7	10	62
Thunderbirds	0	0	0	0	0
