= 2022 NCAA Division I Football Championship Game =

Postseason college football game

2022 NCAA Division I Football Championship
- FCS National Championship Game
| Montana State Bobcats | North Dakota State Bison |
| (12–2) | (13–1) |
| Big Sky | Missouri Valley |
| 10 | 38 |
| Head coach: Brent Vigen | Head coach: Matt Entz |
| STATS / Seed; 7 / 8 | STATS / Seed; 3 / 2 |
| | 1 | 2 | 3 | 4 | Total |
|---|---|---|---|---|---|
| Montana State | 0 | 0 | 3 | 7 | 10 |
| North Dakota State | 7 | 21 | 10 | 0 | 38 |
- Date: January 8, 2022
- Season: 2021
- Stadium: Toyota Stadium
- Location: Frisco, Texas
- MVP: Hunter Luepke (FB, North Dakota State)
- Favorite: North Dakota State by 7
- Referee: Nolan Dumas (Southland)
- Attendance: 18,942

United States TV coverage
- Network: ESPN2
- Announcers: Dave Flemming (play-by-play), Jay Walker (analyst), Stormy Buonantony (sideline)

International TV coverage
- Network: Canada: TSN2; Brazil: ESPN Brazil
- Announcers: Matheus Pinheiro (play-by-play) and Weinny Eirado (analyst)

The 2022 NCAA Division I Football Championship Game was a postseason college football game played to determine a national champion in the NCAA Division I Football Championship Subdivision (FCS) for the 2021 FCS season. It was contested at Toyota Stadium in Frisco, Texas, on January 8, 2022, with kickoff at 12:00 p.m. EST (11:00 a.m. locally) and televised on ESPN2. It was the culminating game of the 2021 FCS Playoffs.

== Teams ==
The participants of the 2022 NCAA Division I Football Championship Game were the finalists of the 2021 FCS Playoffs.

=== North Dakota State Bison ===
North Dakota State finished their regular season with a 10–1 record (7–1 in conference), losing only to South Dakota State. The Bison were the second-seed in the tournament and received a first-round bye; they then defeated Southern Illinois, East Tennessee State, and James Madison to reach the championship game.

North Dakota State had previously won the FCS Championship Game eight times, most recently the January 2020 edition following the 2019 season.

=== Montana State Bobcats ===
Montana State finished their regular season with a 9–2 record (7–1 in conference), losing only to Wyoming (an FBS team) and Montana. The Bobcats were the eighth-seed in the tournament and received a first-round bye; they then defeated UT Martin, Sam Houston State, and South Dakota State to reach the championship game.

Montana State had previously played in one FCS Championship Game, winning against Louisiana Tech in the 1984 edition following the 1984 season, when the conference was still known as NCAA Division I-AA and the championship game was played in December.

== Game summary ==
Montana State's starting quarterback, Tommy Mellott, sustained an ankle injury during the opening drive of the game and was sidelined for the remainder of the contest. North Dakota State scored four unanswered first-half touchdowns, taking a 28–0 lead en route to a 38–10 final and the program's ninth FCS title in 11 seasons. Fullback Hunter Luepke of North Dakota State rushed for three touchdowns and was named most valuable player.

2022 NCAA Division I Football Championship Game

| Quarter | 1 | 2 | 3 | 4 | Total |
|---|---|---|---|---|---|
| No. 8 Montana State | 0 | 0 | 3 | 7 | 10 |
| No. 2 North Dakota State | 7 | 21 | 10 | 0 | 38 |

at Toyota Stadium • Frisco, Texas

- Date: January 8, 2022
- Game time: 12:00 p.m. EST (11:00 a.m. CST)
- Game weather: Cloudy • Temperature: 48 °F (9 °C) • Wind: SE 9 mph (14 km/h)
- Game attendance: 18,942
- Referee: Nolan Dumas
- TV: ESPN2
- Box score

Game information

First quarter

- 6:48 NDSU – Hunter Luepke 8-yard rush, Jake Reinholz kick good. Drive: 11 plays, 80 yards, 5:01. NDSU 7–0

Second quarter

- 14:56 NDSU – Hunter Luepke 11-yard rush, Jake Reinholz kick good. Drive: 7 plays, 75 yards, 3:22. NDSU 14–0
- 10:50 NDSU – Kobe Johnson 76-yard rush, Jake Reinholz kick good. Drive: 2 plays, 75 yards, 0:50. NDSU 21–0
- 0:32 NDSU – Hunter Luepke 6-yard rush, Jake Reinholz kick good. Drive: 14 plays, 85 yards, 4:54. NDSU 28–0

Third quarter

- 12:34 NDSU – Josh Babicz 35-yard pass from Cam Miller, Jake Reinholz kick good. Drive: 5 plays, 65 yards, 2:26. NDSU 35–0
- 7:43 MTST – Blake Glessner 26-yard field goal. Drive: 12 plays, 67 yards, 4:51. NDSU 35–3
- 0:38 NDSU – Jake Reinholz 37-yard field goal. Drive: 7 plays, 29 yards, 3:35. NDSU 38–3

Fourth quarter

- 5:08 MTST – Lance McCutcheon 28-yard pass from Tucker Rovig, Blake Glessner kick good. Drive: 11 plays, 80 yards, 4:43. NDSU 38–10

=== Statistics ===
| Statistics | MTST | NDSU |
|---|---|---|
| First downs | 17 | 23 |
| Plays–yards | 65–335 | 66–506 |
| Rushes–yards | 34–156 | 53–380 |
| Passing yards | 179 | 126 |
| Passing: comp–att–int | 15–31–1 | 9–13–0 |
| Time of possession | 26:12 | 33:48 |

| Team | Category | Player | Statistics |
|---|---|---|---|
| MTST | Passing | Tucker Rovig | 13/28, 156 yards, TD, INT |
| MTST | Rushing | Isaiah Ifanse | 18 carries, 84 yards |
| MTST | Receiving | Lance McCutcheon | 5 receptions, 106 yards, TD |
| NDSU | Passing | Cam Miller | 9/13, 126 yards, TD |
| NDSU | Rushing | Kobe Johnson | 4 carries, 106 yards, TD |
| NDSU | Receiving | Christian Watson | 4 receptions, 61 yards |
