= 2021 Portland State Vikings football team =

American college football season

2021 Portland State Vikings football
- Conference: Big Sky Conference
- Record: 5–6 (4–4 Big Sky)
- Head coach: Bruce Barnum (7th season)
- Offensive coordinator: Matt Leunen (3rd season)
- Offensive scheme: Pro spread
- Defensive coordinator: Payam Saadat (4th season)
- Base defense: 3–3–5
- Home stadium: Hillsboro Stadium

2021 Big Sky Conference football standings
	Conf.			Overall
Team	W		L	W		L
No. 10 Sacramento State $^	8	–	0	9	–	3
No. 2 Montana State ^	7	–	1	11	–	3
No. 7 Eastern Washington ^	6	–	2	10	–	3
No. 6 Montana ^	6	–	2	10	–	3
No. 17 UC Davis ^	5	–	3	8	–	4
Weber State	5	–	3	6	–	5
Northern Arizona	4	–	4	5	–	6
Portland State	4	–	4	5	–	6
Idaho	3	–	5	4	–	7
Northern Colorado	2	–	6	3	–	8
Cal Poly	1	–	7	2	–	9
Idaho State	1	–	7	1	–	10
Southern Utah	0	–	8	1	–	10
$ – Conference champion; ^ – FCS playoff participant; Rankings from STATS Poll

The 2021 Portland State Vikings football team represented Portland State University as a member of the Big Sky Conference during the 2021 NCAA Division I FCS football season. Led by seventh-year head coach Bruce Barnum, they played their home games at Hillsboro Stadium in Portland, Oregon.

== Preseason ==
=== Polls ===
On July 26, 2021, during the virtual Big Sky Kickoff, the Vikings were predicted to finish tenth in the Big Sky by both the coaches and media.

=== Preseason All–Big Sky team ===
The Vikings had one player selected to the preseason all-Big Sky team.

Defense

Anthony Adams – S

== Schedule ==
Date	Time	Opponent	Site	TV	Result	Attendance
September 4	9:00 p.m.	at Hawaii*	Clarence T. C. Ching Athletics Complex; Honolulu, HI	SPEC PPV	L 35–49	0
September 11	3:00 p.m.	at Washington State*	Martin Stadium; Pullman, WA	P12N	L 24–44	22,651
September 18	2:05 p.m.	Western Oregon*	Hillsboro Stadium; Hillsboro, OR	ESPN+	W 21–7	3,124
September 25	2:05 p.m.	No. 13 Montana State	Hillsboro Stadium; Hillsboro, OR	ESPN+	L 17–30	4,095
October 2	5:00 p.m.	at Southern Utah	Eccles Coliseum; Cedar City, UT	ESPN+	W 20–13	4,013
October 9	2:00 p.m.	at Idaho	Kibbie Dome; Moscow, ID	ESPN+	L 35–42	7,034
October 16	2:05 p.m.	Idaho State	Hillsboro Stadium; Hillsboro, OR	ESPN+	W 31–10	1,809
October 30	2:05 p.m.	Cal Poly	Hillsboro Stadium; Hillsboro, OR	ESPN+	W 42–31	3,245
November 6	12:00 p.m.	at No. 24 Weber State	Stewart Stadium; Ogden, UT	ESPN+	W 30–18	4,433
November 13	6:00 p.m.	at No. 12 Sacramento State	Hornet Stadium; Sacramento, CA	ESPN+	L 20–49	5,848
November 20	2:05 p.m.	No. 5 Eastern Washington	Hillsboro Stadium; Hillsboro, OR (The Dam Cup)	ESPN+	L 28–42	3,971
*Non-conference game; Rankings from STATS Poll released prior to the game; All times are in Pacific time

== Roster ==
2021 Portland State Vikings football team roster
Players
Coaches
Offense

Pos.	#	Name	Class
WR	3	Job Dockery	Jr
WR	4	Deion Malone	Jr
QB	6	Davis Alexander	Sr
WR	8	George McCorley	Jr
QB	9	Nathan West	Jr
WR	13	Beau Kelly	Jr
WR	14	Jerad Toman	So
QB	15	Dante Chachere	Fr
QB	16	DeMontre Thomas	Fr
QB	17	Jalen Chatman	So
WR	19	Darien Chase	Fr
RB	21	Jarmar Julian	So
RB	22	Bishop Mitchell	Jr
RB	25	JoJo Siofele	Fr
RB	27	Malik Walker	Sr
RB	28	Jobi Malary	Fr
RB	29	Jalynnee McGee	Fr
RB	36	Ahmir McGee	So
OL	60	Brady Brick	Jr
OL	61	Shiloh Taʻase	So
OL	62	Bubba Waʻa	So
OL	66	Hayden Engel	Fr
OL	67	Ethan Wallis	Fr
OL	71	John Krahn	Sr
OL	73	D'Angalo Titialii	Fr
OL	74	Tyson Pauling	Jr
OL	75	Alex Rockwell	Jr
OL	76	Tommy Laverde	Sr
OL	77	Carlton Lorenz	GS
OL	78	Richard Estrella	Fr
OL	79	Carlos Barraza	Sr
WR	80	Emmanuel Daigbe	Sr
WR	81	Mataio Talalemotu	Jr
WR	82	Malcolm Tatum	Fr
TE	83	Daniel Giannosa	Sr
TE	84	Elias Spence	Fr
TE	85	Anthony Rodriguez	Jr
TE	86	John Schulte	So
WR	87	Nate Bennett	Fr
TE	88	Malik Thirdgill	Jr
WR		Tre Anderson	Fr
RB		Treyvon Westerling	Fr
QB		Caden Filer	Fr
ATH		Mason Packer	Fr
TE		Brad Young	Fr

Defense

Pos.	#	Name	Class
DB	1	Broderick Harrell	Sr
S	2	Xavier Bell	Jr
DT	5	Semise Kofe	Sr
S	7	Ryan Lesch	Sr
S	10	De'Jon Fort	Jr
CB	12	Semaj Bolin	Fr
S	14	Anthony Adams	Jr
S	15	Robert Holt	Jr
S	16	KJ Walker	Sr
S	20	Greg Oliver	So
DB	23	Daluan Bright	Fr
DB	24	Davion Gaines	Fr
LB	26	Nicolas Ah Sam	Sr
CB	28	Arin Mannery	Sr
CB	30	Travis West	Fr
S	31	Karsonne Winters	Fr
LB	32	Isaiah Henry	So
S	33	David Joseph	So
S	34	Ty Apana-Purcell	Sr
DB	35	Michael Jackson	Fr
LB	37	Monquel Glasgow	Jr
CB	38	Evan Camarena	Jr
DB	39	Tyreese Shakir	Fr
CB	40	Benton Hoge	So
LB	41	Justice Pagan	Fr
LB	42	Steffen Jacobsen	Sr
DT	43	VJ Malo	Jr
LB	44	Zack Mandera	So
LB	45	Moses Finau	Jr
DL	46	Kennedy Freeman	Fr
LB	47	Tevita Tuitavake	Jr
LB	49	Parker McKenna	Fr
DE	50	Cody Brown	Sr
LB	51	Levi O'Connell	So
DE	53	Noah Yunker	Sr
DE	54	Jake Porter	Jr
DT	55	Boogie Davis	Jr
DT	90	Serge Rusnak	So
DE	91	Jayson Pace	So
DE	92	Zane Maningo	Fr
DL	93	Martin Salazar	Fr
DT	94	Ethan Tela-Porter	Fr
DE	95	Spencer Delacruz	Fr
DT	97	Tiano Tialavea	GS
DT	98	Holden Williams	Jr
DB		Jayden Brannan	Fr
DT		Jessie Brown	Fr
DB		Jermaine Flentroy	Fr
DB		Ronan Gay	Fr
DB		Stetler Harms	Fr
DB		Jake Urena	So

Special teams

Pos.	#	Name	Class
PK	57	Cody Williams	Jr
LS	59	Ryan Alvidrez	Fr
PK	97	Gianni Smith	Fr
P	99	Seth Vernon	Sr

Head coach

- Bruce Barnum (Eastern Washington)

Coordinators/assistant coaches

- Payam Saadat (Washington State)
  Associate head coach/defensive coordinator/defensive line
- Matt Leunen (Portland State)
  Offensive coordinator/offensive line
- John Ely (Western Washington)
  Linebackers
- Evan Mozzochi (Western Oregon)
  Quarterbacks/Tight Ends/co-Recruiting
- Colin Fry (Nevada)
  Defensive Backs/co-Recruiting
- Skyler Fulton (Arizona State)
  Wide receivers
- Jason Diffee (Portland State)
  Special teams

Support staff

- Brad Packer (Eastern Washington)
  Strength & conditioning

Legend

- (C) Team captain
- (S) Suspended
- (I) Ineligible
- Injured
- Redshirt

Roster
Last update: May 28, 2021

== Game summaries ==
=== At Hawaii ===
	1	2	3	4	Total
Vikings	0	7	21	7	35
Rainbow Warriors	28	7	7	7	49

=== At Washington State ===
	1	2	3	4	Total
Vikings	0	10	0	14	24
Cougars	7	23	7	7	44

=== Western Oregon ===
	1	2	3	4	Total
Wolves	0	0	0	7	7
Vikings	7	0	14	0	21

=== No. 13 Montana State ===
	1	2	3	4	Total
No. 13 Bobcats	3	6	14	7	30
Vikings	10	0	7	0	17

=== At Southern Utah ===
	1	2	3	4	Total
Vikings	0	10	3	7	20
Thunderbirds	3	7	3	0	13

=== At Idaho ===
	1	2	3	4	Total
Vikings	7	7	0	21	35
Vandals	21	14	0	7	42

=== Idaho State ===
	1	2	3	4	Total
Bengals	0	7	0	3	10
Vikings	17	7	7	0	31

=== Cal Poly ===
	1	2	3	4	Total
Mustangs	6	0	8	7	21
Vikings	14	0	7	21	42

=== At No. 24 Weber State ===
	1	2	3	4	Total
Vikings	0	10	7	13	30
No. 24 Wildcats	7	0	3	8	18

=== At No. 12 Sacramento State ===
	1	2	3	4	Total
Vikings	0	7	7	6	20
No. 12 Hornets	3	18	14	14	49

=== No 5. Eastern Washington ===
	1	2	3	4	Total
No. 5 Eagles	7	7	21	7	42
Vikings	7	7	7	7	28
