= 2021 Northern Colorado Bears football team =

American college football season

2021 Northern Colorado Bears football
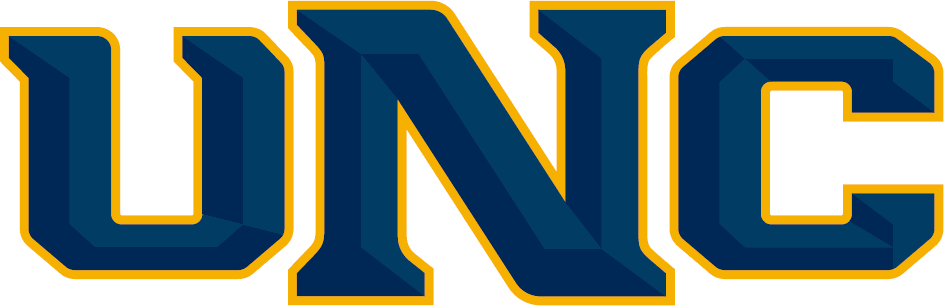
- Conference: Big Sky Conference
- Record: 3–8 (2–6 Big Sky)
- Head coach: Ed McCaffrey (1st season)
- Offensive coordinator: Max McCaffrey (1st season)
- Defensive coordinator: Scott Darnell (1st season)
- Home stadium: Nottingham Field

2021 Big Sky Conference football standings
	Conf.			Overall
Team	W		L	W		L
No. 10 Sacramento State $^	8	–	0	9	–	3
No. 2 Montana State ^	7	–	1	11	–	3
No. 7 Eastern Washington ^	6	–	2	10	–	3
No. 6 Montana ^	6	–	2	10	–	3
No. 17 UC Davis ^	5	–	3	8	–	4
Weber State	5	–	3	6	–	5
Northern Arizona	4	–	4	5	–	6
Portland State	4	–	4	5	–	6
Idaho	3	–	5	4	–	7
Northern Colorado	2	–	6	3	–	8
Cal Poly	1	–	7	2	–	9
Idaho State	1	–	7	1	–	10
Southern Utah	0	–	8	1	–	10
$ – Conference champion; ^ – FCS playoff participant; Rankings from STATS Poll

The 2021 Northern Colorado Bears football team represented the University of Northern Colorado as a member of the Big Sky Conference during the 2021 NCAA Division I FCS football season. They were led by first-year head coach Ed McCaffrey and played their home games at Nottingham Field.

== Preseason ==
=== Big Sky preseason poll ===
On July 26, 2021, during the virtual Big Sky Kickoff, the Mustangs were predicted to finish in the Big Sky last in the media and twelfth in the coaches.

=== Preseason All-Big Sky team ===
The Bears did not have any players selected to the preseason all-Big Sky team.

== Schedule ==
Date	Time	Opponent	Site	TV	Result	Attendance
September 3	7:00 p.m.	at Colorado*	Folsom Stadium; Boulder, CO	P12N	L 7–35	44,153
September 11	5:00 p.m.	at Houston Baptist*	Husky Stadium; Houston, TX	ESPN+	W 45–13	2,135
September 18	2:00 p.m.	Lamar*	Nottingham Field; Greeley, CO	ESPN+	L 10–17 ^{OT}	5,605
September 25	1:00 p.m.	Northern Arizona	Nottingham Field; Greeley, CO	ESPN+	W 17–10 ^{OT}	5,769
October 2	1:00 p.m.	at No. 11 Montana State	Bobcat Stadium; Bozeman, MT	ESPN+	L 7–40	20,127
October 9	1:00 p.m.	No. 4 Eastern Washington^{†}	Nottingham Field; Greeley, CO	ESPN+	L 17–63	5,413
October 16	6:00 p.m.	at No. 13 UC Davis	UC Davis Health Stadium; Davis, CA	ESPN+	L 3–32	10,963
October 23	6:00 p.m.	at Southern Utah	Eccles Coliseum; Cedar City, UT	ESPN+	W 17–9	3,208
October 30	1:00 p.m.	No. 15 Sacramento State	Nottingham Field; Greeley, CO	ESPN+	L 24–27	4,068
November 6	12:00 p.m.	No. 11 Montana	Nottingham Field; Greeley, CO	ESPN+	L 0–35	4,987
November 20	1:00 p.m.	at Weber State	Stewart Stadium; Ogden, UT	ESPN+	L 17-48	3,242
*Non-conference game; ^{†}Homecoming; Rankings from STATS Poll released prior to the game; All times are in Mountain time

== Game summaries ==
=== At Colorado ===
	1	2	3	4	Total
Bears	0	0	7	0	7
Buffaloes	0	14	7	14	35

=== At Houston Baptist ===
	1	2	3	4	Total
Bears	14	7	17	7	45
Huskies	0	6	7	0	13

=== Lamar ===
	1	2	3	4	OT	Total
Cardinals	0	7	0	3	7	17
Bears	0	7	0	3	0	10

=== Northern Arizona ===
	1	2	3	4	OT	Total
Lumberjacks	0	7	0	3	0	10
Bears	0	3	7	0	7	17

=== At No. 11 Montana State ===
	1	2	3	4	Total
Bears	0	7	0	0	7
No. 11 Bobcats	17	10	13	0	40

=== No. 4 Eastern Washington ===
	1	2	3	4	Total
No. 4 Eagles	22	21	10	10	63
Bears	3	7	7	0	17

=== At No. 13 UC Davis ===
	1	2	3	4	Total
Bears	0	0	0	3	3
No. 13 Aggies	0	11	7	14	32

=== At Southern Utah ===
	1	2	3	4	Total
Bears	7	3	0	7	17
Thunderbirds	3	0	3	3	9

=== No. 15 Sacramento State ===
	1	2	3	4	Total
No. 15 Hornets	10	7	3	7	27
Bears	0	7	10	7	24

=== No. 11 Montana ===
	1	2	3	4	Total
No. 11 Grizzlies	14	7	14	0	35
Bears	0	0	0	0	0

=== At Weber State ===
	1	2	3	4	Total
Wildcats	3	21	24	0	48
Bears	3	14	0	0	17
