= 2021 Northern Arizona Lumberjacks football team =

American college football season

2021 Northern Arizona Lumberjacks football
- Conference: Big Sky Conference
- Record: 5–6 (4–4 Big Sky)
- Head coach: Chris Ball (3rd season)
- Offensive coordinator: Aaron Pflugrad (4th season)
- Defensive coordinator: Jerry Partridge (3rd season)
- Home stadium: Walkup Skydome

2021 Big Sky Conference football standings
	Conf.			Overall
Team	W		L	W		L
No. 10 Sacramento State $^	8	–	0	9	–	3
No. 2 Montana State ^	7	–	1	11	–	3
No. 7 Eastern Washington ^	6	–	2	10	–	3
No. 6 Montana ^	6	–	2	10	–	3
No. 17 UC Davis ^	5	–	3	8	–	4
Weber State	5	–	3	6	–	5
Northern Arizona	4	–	4	5	–	6
Portland State	4	–	4	5	–	6
Idaho	3	–	5	4	–	7
Northern Colorado	2	–	6	3	–	8
Cal Poly	1	–	7	2	–	9
Idaho State	1	–	7	1	–	10
Southern Utah	0	–	8	1	–	10
$ – Conference champion; ^ – FCS playoff participant; Rankings from STATS Poll

The 2021 Northern Arizona Lumberjacks football team represented Northern Arizona University as a member of the Big Sky Conference during the 2021 NCAA Division I FCS football season. They were led by third-year head coach Chris Ball and played their home games at the Walkup Skydome.

== Preseason ==
=== Polls ===
On July 26, 2021, during the virtual Big Sky Kickoff, the Lumberjacks were predicted to finish seventh in the Big Sky by both the coaches and media.

=== Preseason All–Big Sky team ===
The Lumberjacks had two players selected to the preseason all-Big Sky team.

Defense

Morgan Vest – S

Special teams

Luis Aguilar – K

== Schedule ==
Date	Time	Opponent	Site	TV	Result	Attendance
September 2	6:00 p.m.	No. 1 Sam Houston*	Walkup Skydome; Flagstaff, AZ	ESPN+	L 16–42	8,564
September 11	11:00 a.m.	at South Dakota*	DakotaDome; Vermillion, SD	ESPN+	L 7–34	5,247
September 18	7:00 p.m.	at Arizona*	Arizona Stadium; Tucson, AZ	P12N	W 21–19	33,481
September 25	12:00 p.m.	at Northern Colorado	Nottingham Field; Greeley, CO	ESPN+	L 10–17 ^{OT}	5,769
October 2	1:00 p.m.	Idaho State	Walkup Skydome; Flagstaff, AZ	ESPN+	W 48–17	9,713
October 16	1:00 p.m.	Southern Utah^{†}	Walkup Skydome; Flagstaff, AZ (Grand Canyon Rivalry)	ESPN+	W 59–35	7,511
October 23	6:00 p.m.	at No. 19 Sacramento State	Hornet Stadium; Sacramento, CA	ESPN+	L 0–44	8,210
October 30	1:00 p.m.	at Idaho	Kibbie Dome; Moscow, ID	ESPN+	W 38–31	0
November 6	1:00 p.m.	No. 8 UC Davis	Walkup Skydome; Flagstaff, AZ	ESPN+	L 24–40	6,088
November 13	1:00 p.m.	No. 9 Montana	Walkup Skydome; Flagstaff, AZ	ESPN+	L 3–30	6,225
November 20	6:05 p.m.	at Cal Poly	Alex G. Spanos Stadium; San Luis Obispo, CA	ESPN+	W 45-21	6,371
*Non-conference game; ^{†}Homecoming; Rankings from STATS Poll released prior to the game; All times are in Mountain time

== Game summaries ==
=== No. 1 Sam Houston ===
	1	2	3	4	Total
No. 1 Bearkats	7	14	14	7	42
Lumberjacks	0	7	9	0	16

=== At South Dakota ===
	1	2	3	4	Total
Lumberjacks	0	0	7	0	7
Coyotes	17	10	7	0	34

=== At Arizona ===
	1	2	3	4	Total
Lumberjacks	0	7	7	7	21
Wildcats	10	3	0	6	19

=== At Northern Colorado ===
	1	2	3	4	OT	Total
Lumberjacks	0	7	0	3	0	10
Bears	0	3	7	0	7	17

=== Idaho State ===
	1	2	3	4	Total
Bengals	7	0	3	7	17
Lumberjacks	3	20	15	10	48

=== Southern Utah ===
	1	2	3	4	Total
Thunderbirds	0	14	14	7	35
Lumberjacks	17	14	14	14	59

=== At No. 19 Sacramento State ===
	1	2	3	4	Total
Lumberjacks	0	0	0	0	0
No. 19 Hornets	3	34	0	7	44

=== At Idaho ===
	1	2	3	4	Total
Lumberjacks	14	3	14	7	38
Vandals	7	14	0	10	31

=== No. 8 UC Davis ===
	1	2	3	4	Total
No. 8 Aggies	8	12	17	3	40
Lumberjacks	14	3	0	7	24

=== No. 9 Montana ===
	1	2	3	4	Total
No. 9 Grizzlies	0	13	7	10	30
Lumberjacks	0	0	3	0	3

=== At Cal Poly ===
	1	2	3	4	Total
Lumberjacks	7	31	7	0	45
Mustangs	7	7	0	7	21
