= 2021 UC Davis Aggies football team =

American college football season

2021 UC Davis Aggies football

NCAA Division I First Round, L 24–56 vs. South Dakota State
- Conference: Big Sky Conference

Ranking
- STATS: No. 17
- FCS Coaches: No. 16
- Record: 8–4 (5–3 Big Sky)
- Head coach: Dan Hawkins (5th season)
- Offensive coordinator: Cody Hawkins (1st season)
- Defensive coordinator: Matt Coombs (2nd season)
- Home stadium: UC Davis Health Stadium

2021 Big Sky Conference football standings
	Conf.			Overall
Team	W		L	W		L
No. 10 Sacramento State $^	8	–	0	9	–	3
No. 2 Montana State ^	7	–	1	11	–	3
No. 7 Eastern Washington ^	6	–	2	10	–	3
No. 6 Montana ^	6	–	2	10	–	3
No. 17 UC Davis ^	5	–	3	8	–	4
Weber State	5	–	3	6	–	5
Northern Arizona	4	–	4	5	–	6
Portland State	4	–	4	5	–	6
Idaho	3	–	5	4	–	7
Northern Colorado	2	–	6	3	–	8
Cal Poly	1	–	7	2	–	9
Idaho State	1	–	7	1	–	10
Southern Utah	0	–	8	1	–	10
$ – Conference champion; ^ – FCS playoff participant; Rankings from STATS Poll

The 2021 UC Davis football team represented the University of California, Davis as a member of the Big Sky Conference during the 2021 NCAA Division I FCS football season. The season Led by fifth-year head coach Dan Hawkins, the Aggies compiled an overall record of 8–4 with a mark of 5–3 in conference play, tying for third place in the Big Sky. UC Davis received an at-large bid to the NCAA Division I Football Championship playoff, where they lost to South Dakota State in the first round. The Aggies played home games at UC Davis Health Stadium in Davis, California.

== Preseason ==
=== Polls ===
On July 26, 2021, during the virtual Big Sky Kickoff, the Aggies were predicted to finish sixth in the Big Sky by both the coaches and media.

=== Preseason All–Big Sky team ===
The Aggies had three players selected to the preseason all-Big Sky team.

Offense

Connor Pettek – C

Defense

Bryce Rodgers – DT

Special teams

Daniel Whelan – K

== Schedule ==
Date	Time	Opponent	Rank	Site	TV	Result	Attendance
September 2	4:30 p.m.	at Tulsa*	No. 23	Skelly Field at H. A. Chapman Stadium; Tulsa, OK	ESPN+	W 19–17	15,085
September 11	1:00 p.m.	at San Diego*	No. 14	Torero Stadium; San Diego, CA		W 53–7	1,712
September 18	7:00 p.m.	Dixie State*	No. 14	UC Davis Health Stadium; Davis, CA	ESPN+	W 60–27	9,865
September 25	5:00 p.m.	at No. 14 Weber State	No. 12	Stewart Stadium; Ogden, UT	ESPN+	W 17–14	6,802
October 2	7:00 p.m.	Idaho	No. 8	UC Davis Health Stadium; Davis, CA	ESPN+	W 27–20	11,622
October 9	12:00 p.m.	at Idaho State	No. 7	Holt Arena; Pocatello, ID	ESPN+	L 17–27	5,206
October 16	5:00 p.m.	Northern Colorado^{†}	No. 13	UC Davis Health Stadium; Davis, CA	ESPN+	W 32–3	10,963
October 23	5:00 p.m.	at Cal Poly	No. 10	Alex G. Spanos Stadium; San Luis Obispo, CA (Battle for the Golden Horseshoe)	ESPN+	W 24–13	9,573
November 6	12:00 p.m.	at Northern Arizona	No. 8	Walkup Skydome; Flagstaff, AZ	ESPN+	W 40–24	6,088
November 13	5:00 p.m.	No. 7 Eastern Washington	No. 6	UC Davis Health Stadium; Davis, CA	ESPN+	L 20–38	7,344
November 20	6:00 p.m.	No. 11 Sacramento State	No. 10	UC Davis Health Stadium; Davis, CA (Causeway Classic)	ESPN+	L 7–27	12,315
November 27	12:00 p.m.	at No. 11 South Dakota State*	No. 14	Dana J. Dykhouse Stadium; Brookings, SD (NCAA Division I First Round)	ESPN+	L 24–56	3,681
*Non-conference game; ^{†}Homecoming; Rankings from STATS Poll released prior to the game; All times are in Pacific time

== Game summaries ==
=== At Tulsa ===
	1	2	3	4	Total
No. 23 Aggies	7	3	3	6	19
Golden Hurricane	3	7	7	0	17

=== At San Diego ===
	1	2	3	4	Total
No. 14 Aggies	16	6	14	17	53
Toreros	0	0	7	0	7

=== Dixie State ===
	1	2	3	4	Total
Trailblazers	7	6	14	0	27
No. 14 Aggies	15	21	3	21	60

=== At No. 14 Weber State ===
	1	2	3	4	Total
No. 12 Aggies	0	7	3	7	17
No. 14 Wildcats	0	7	7	0	14

=== Idaho ===
	1	2	3	4	Total
Vandals	6	7	7	0	20
No. 8 Aggies	3	10	0	14	27

=== At Idaho State ===
	1	2	3	4	Total
No. 7 Aggies	0	3	0	14	17
Bengals	14	10	0	3	27

=== Northern Colorado ===
	1	2	3	4	Total
Bears	0	0	0	3	3
No. 13 Aggies	0	11	7	14	32

=== At Cal Poly ===
	1	2	3	4	Total
No. 10 Aggies	0	10	14	0	24
Mustangs	0	7	6	0	13

=== At Northern Arizona ===
	1	2	3	4	Total
No. 8 Aggies	8	12	17	3	40
Lumberjacks	14	3	0	7	24

=== No. 7 Eastern Washington ===
	1	2	3	4	Total
No. 7 Eagles	0	14	10	14	38
No. 6 Aggies	7	3	7	3	20

=== No. 11 Sacramento State ===
	1	2	3	4	Total
No. 11 Hornets	7	17	3	0	27
No. 10 Aggies	0	0	0	7	7

== Ranking movements ==
Ranking movements Legend: ██ Increase in ranking ██ Decrease in ranking
	Week													
Poll	Pre	1	2	3	4	5	6	7	8	9	10	11	12	Final
STATS	23	14	14	12	8	7	13	10	9	8	6	10	14	17
Coaches	21	12	12	10	8	8	12	10	9	7	4	11	16	16
