= 2021 Montana State Bobcats football team =

American college football season

2021 Montana State Bobcats football
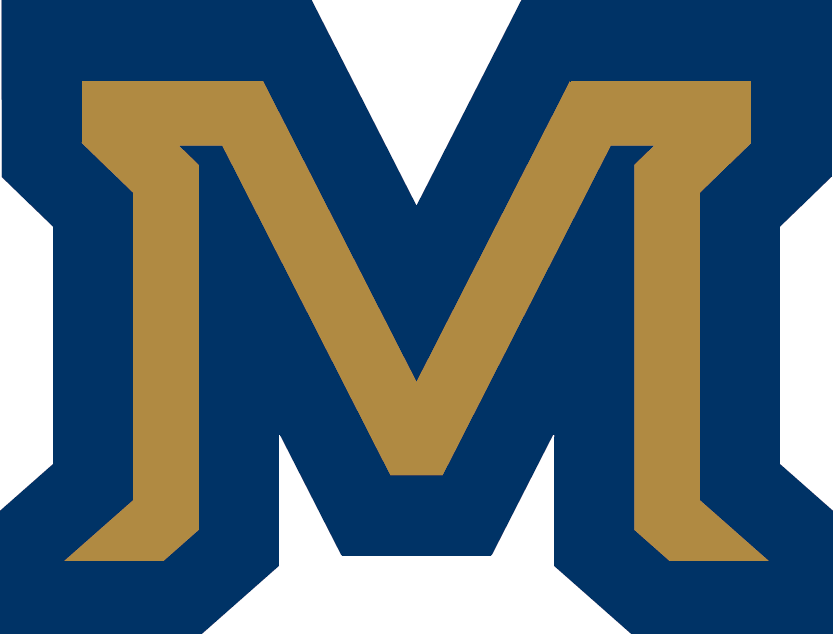

NCAA Division I Championship Game, L 10–38 vs. North Dakota State
- Conference: Big Sky Conference

Ranking
- STATS: No. 2
- FCS Coaches: No. 2
- Record: 12–3 (7–1 Big Sky)
- Head coach: Brent Vigen (1st season)
- Offensive coordinator: Taylor Housewright (1st season)
- Offensive scheme: Pro-style
- Defensive coordinator: Freddie Banks (1st season)
- Base defense: 4–2–5
- Home stadium: Bobcat Stadium

2021 Big Sky Conference football standings
	Conf.			Overall
Team	W		L	W		L
No. 10 Sacramento State $^	8	–	0	9	–	3
No. 2 Montana State ^	7	–	1	11	–	3
No. 7 Eastern Washington ^	6	–	2	10	–	3
No. 6 Montana ^	6	–	2	10	–	3
No. 17 UC Davis ^	5	–	3	8	–	4
Weber State	5	–	3	6	–	5
Northern Arizona	4	–	4	5	–	6
Portland State	4	–	4	5	–	6
Idaho	3	–	5	4	–	7
Northern Colorado	2	–	6	3	–	8
Cal Poly	1	–	7	2	–	9
Idaho State	1	–	7	1	–	10
Southern Utah	0	–	8	1	–	10
$ – Conference champion; ^ – FCS playoff participant; Rankings from STATS Poll

The 2021 Montana State Bobcats football team represented Montana State University in the Big Sky Conference during the 2021 NCAA Division I FCS football season. Led by first-year head coach Brent Vigen, the Bobcats played home games on campus at Bobcat Stadium in Bozeman, Montana.

Montana State finished the regular season at 9–2 (7–1 in Big Sky, second), losing only to Wyoming (FBS, Mountain West) and rival Montana. Seeded eighth in the FCS postseason, they received a first-round bye, then defeated UT Martin, #1 Sam Houston, and South Dakota State. MSU advanced to the championship game in Texas on January 8, 2022, but fell 38–10 to #3 North Dakota State.

== Preseason ==
On July 26, 2021, during the virtual Big Sky Kickoff, the Bobcats were predicted to finish fourth in the Big Sky by both the coaches and media.

=== Preseason All–Big Sky team ===
The Bobcats had two players selected to the preseason all-Big Sky team.

Offense

Taylor Tuiasosopo – OL

Defense

Troy Andersen – OLB

== Schedule ==
Date	Time	Opponent	Rank	Site	TV	Result	Attendance
September 4	2:00 p.m.	at Wyoming*	No. 12	War Memorial Stadium; Laramie, WY	ESPN+	L 16–19	30,007
September 11	6:00 p.m.	Drake*	No. 11	Bobcat Stadium; Bozeman, MT	SWX	W 45–7	19,797
September 18	1:00 p.m.	San Diego*	No. 13	Bobcat Stadium; Bozeman, MT	SWX	W 52–10	19,107
September 25	3:05 p.m.	at Portland State	No. 13	Hillsboro Stadium; Hillsboro, OR	ESPN+	W 30–17	4,095
October 2	1:05 p.m.	Northern Colorado	No. 11	Bobcat Stadium; Bozeman, MT	SWX	W 40–7	20,127
October 9	2:00 p.m.	Cal Poly^{†}	No. 10	Bobcat Stadium; Bozeman, MT	RTNW	W 45–7	19,847
October 15	8:00 p.m.	at No. 19 Weber State	No. 9	Stewart Stadium; Ogden, UT	ESPNU	W 13–7	6,323
October 23	1:00 p.m.	Idaho State	No. 8	Bobcat Stadium; Bozeman, MT	SWX	W 27–9	19,297
November 6	2:00 p.m.	at No. 5 Eastern Washington	No. 4	Roos Field; Cheney, WA	SWX	W 23–20	6,981
November 13	1:00 p.m.	Idaho	No. 3	Bobcat Stadium; Bozeman, MT	SWX	W 20–13	19,447
November 20	12:00 p.m.	at No. 7 Montana	No. 3	Washington–Grizzly Stadium; Missoula, MT (rivalry)	RTNW	L 10–29	26,856
December 4	2:00 p.m.	No. 16 UT Martin*	No. 7	Bobcat Stadium; Bozeman, MT (NCAA Division I Second Round)	ESPN+	W 26–7	15,237
December 11	6:30 p.m.	at No. 1 Sam Houston*	No. 7	Bowers Stadium; Huntsville, TX (NCAA Division I Quarterfinal)	ESPN+	W 42–19	7,565
December 18	12:00 p.m.	No. 11 South Dakota State*	No. 7	Bobcat Stadium; Bozeman, MT (NCAA Division I Semifinal)	ESPN2	W 31–17	20,457
January 8, 2022	10:00 a.m.	vs. No. 3 North Dakota State*	No. 7	Toyota Stadium; Frisco, TX (NCAA Division I Championship Game)	ESPN2	L 10–38	18,942
*Non-conference game; ^{†}Homecoming; Rankings from STATS Poll released prior to the game; All times are in Mountain time

== Roster ==
2021 Montana State Bobcats football team roster
Players
Coaches
Offense

Pos.	#	Name	Class
WR	0	Cam Gardner	So
WR	3	Coy Steel	Jr
WR	5	Charles Brown	Fr
QB	7	Casey Bauman	So
TE	8	Derryk Snell	So
WR	9	Jamahd Monroe	Fr
WR	10	Nate Stewart	GS
WR	11	Willie Patterson	Jr
QB	12	Tucker Rovig	Jr
RB	13	Elijah Elliott	Fr
TE	14	Peyton Thornton	Fr
QB	16	Tommy Mellott	Fr
WR	16	Tanner Trafton	Fr
WR	17	Jaden Smith	Fr
QB	18	Sean Austin	Fr
RB	18	DeMareus Hosey	Fr
RB	19	Jaharie Martin	Fr
RB	22	Isaiah Ifanse	Jr
RB	24	Lane Sumner	So
WR	25	Andrew Patterson	Fr
RB	29	Jaalen Rening	Fr
RB	38	Garrett Coon	Fr
TE	42	R. J. Fitzgerald	Jr
TE	48	Ryan Davis	Sr
TE	49	Dyse Shepherd	Fr
OL	51	Taylor Tuiasosopo	Sr
OL	56	Cole Sain	So
OL	58	Aaron Richards	Fr
OL	59	Zach Redd	Jr
OL	60	Dontae Myrick	Fr
OL	61	Cole Snyder	Fr
OL	62	Dylan Porter	Jr
OL	63	Rush Reimer	Fr
OL	65	Justus Perkins	Fr
OL	67	Joe McElroy	So
OL	70	Holden Sampson	Fr
OL	72	T. J. Session	Fr
OL	73	Titan Fleischmann	Fr
OL	74	Conor Reitler	Fr
OL	75	Jacob Kettels	Fr
OL	76	Lewis Kidd	Sr
OL	79	Jack Harlow	Fr
TE	80	Treyton Pickering	So
WR	81	Tayvian Williams	So
TE	82	Elijah Reynolds	Fr
WR	83	Logan Kleinhans	So
WR	84	Peyton Hanser	Jr
WR	85	Aidan Garrigan	Fr
WR	86	Lance McCutcheon	Sr
TE	87	Ryan Lonergan	Fr
TE	88	Jarrett Kessler	Jr

Defense

Pos.	#	Name	Class
CB	0	Tyrel Thomas	Sr
DB	1	Eric Zambrano	So
DB	2	Tre Webb	GS
DE	3	Amandre Williams	Sr
CB	4	James Campbell	Jr
S	5	Jeffrey Manning Jr	Jr
DB	6	Miles Jackson	Fr
DB	7	Ty Okada	Jr
CB	8	Level Price Jr.	So
CB	9	Simeon Woodard	Fr
DE	10	Brody Grebe	Fr
LB	11	Kenneth Eiden IV	Fr
DB	12	Devin Davis	Fr
DB	13	Jackson Harmon	Fr
LB	15	Troy Andersen	Sr
LB	17	Tadan Gilman	Jr
S	18	Kendric Bailey	So
DB	20	Tyson Pottenger	Fr
OLB	23	Aidan Parks	Fr
DB	25	Eli Aby	Fr
DB	26	Rylan Ortt	Fr
DB	27	Connor Ryan	Fr
S	28	Jake D'Agostino	Fr
LB	30	Danny Uluilakepa	Fr
LB	31	Jace Fitzgerald	Fr
ILB	32	Jory Choate	So
DT	33	Blake Hehl	So
LB	34	Nolan Askelson	So
ILB	40	Alex Johnson	Fr
DT	41	Chase Benson	Sr
LB	43	McCade O'Reilly	Fr
DE	44	Daniel Hardy	Sr
LB	45	Hunter Parsons	Fr
DL	50	Zack Black	Fr
LB	53	Luke Fedyk	Fr
LB	54	Cooper Thomas	Fr
DT	55	Tua Areta	Fr
DL	57	Tyson Regimbal	Jr
DL	90	Marcus Wehr	Fr
DE	91	David Alston	So
DL	92	Blake Schmidt	Fr
DL	93	Kyle Rygg	Jr
DL	94	Byron Rollins	Jr
DL	95	Sebastian Valdez	Fr
DL	96	Paul Brott	Fr
DL	98	Ben Seymour	So
DL	99	Trey Yates	Fr

Special teams

Pos.	#	Name	Class
K	35	Luke Pawlak	Fr
P	37	Bryce Leighton	Fr
K	39	Blake Glessner	Fr
LS	71	Tommy Sullivan	Fr

Head coach

- Brent Vigen

Coordinators/assistant coaches

- Taylor Housewright (OC)

Legend

- (C) Team captain
- (S) Suspended
- (I) Ineligible
- Injured
- Redshirt

Roster

== Game summaries ==
=== At Wyoming ===
	1	2	3	4	Total
No. 12 Bobcats	7	0	0	9	16
Cowboys	0	3	0	16	19

=== Drake ===
	1	2	3	4	Total
Bulldogs	0	7	0	0	7
No. 11 Bobcats	9	15	7	14	45

=== San Diego ===
	1	2	3	4	Total
Toreros	0	0	7	3	10
No. 13 Bobcats	21	14	10	7	52

=== At Portland State ===
	1	2	3	4	Total
No. 13 Bobcats	3	6	14	7	30
Vikings	10	0	7	0	17

=== Northern Colorado ===
	1	2	3	4	Total
Bears	0	7	0	0	7
No. 11 Bobcats	17	10	13	0	40

=== Cal Poly ===
	1	2	3	4	Total
Mustangs	0	0	7	0	7
No. 10 Bobcats	7	28	7	3	45

=== At No. 19 Weber State ===
	1	2	3	4	Total
No. 9 Bobcats	7	0	6	0	13
No. 19 Wildcats	7	0	0	0	7

=== Idaho State ===
	1	2	3	4	Total
Bengals	3	0	3	3	9
No. 8 Bobcats	0	10	3	14	27

=== At Eastern Washington ===
	1	2	3	4	Total
No. 4 Bobcats	7	9	0	7	23
No. 5 Eagles	13	0	0	7	20

=== Idaho ===
	1	2	3	4	Total
Vandals	0	10	3	0	13
No. 3 Bobcats	7	6	0	7	20

=== At No. 7 Montana ===
	1	2	3	4	Total
No. 3 Bobcats	3	0	0	7	10
No. 7 Grizzlies	10	6	10	3	29

== Ranking movements ==
Ranking movements Legend: ██ Increase in ranking ██ Decrease in ranking ( ) = First-place votes
	Week													
Poll	Pre	1	2	3	4	5	6	7	8	9	10	11	12	Final
STATS FCS	12	11	13	13	11	10	9	8	6	4	3	3	7	2
Coaches	11	13	13	12	12	11	9	8	6	4	3	3 (1)	9	2
