= 2021 Eastern Washington Eagles football team =

American college football season

2021 Eastern Washington Eagles football
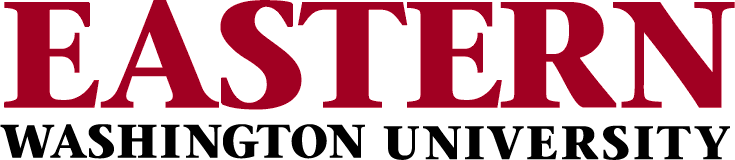

NCAA Division I Second Round, L 41–57 at Montana
- Conference: Big Sky Conference

Ranking
- STATS: No. 7
- FCS Coaches: No. 9
- Record: 10–3 (6–2 Big Sky)
- Head coach: Aaron Best (5th season)
- Co-offensive coordinators: Ian Shoemaker (3rd season; first 9 games); Pat McCann (interim; remainder of season)
- Defensive coordinator: Eti Ena (3rd season)
- Home stadium: Roos Field

2021 Big Sky Conference football standings
	Conf.			Overall
Team	W		L	W		L
No. 10 Sacramento State $^	8	–	0	9	–	3
No. 2 Montana State ^	7	–	1	11	–	3
No. 7 Eastern Washington ^	6	–	2	10	–	3
No. 6 Montana ^	6	–	2	10	–	3
No. 17 UC Davis ^	5	–	3	8	–	4
Weber State	5	–	3	6	–	5
Northern Arizona	4	–	4	5	–	6
Portland State	4	–	4	5	–	6
Idaho	3	–	5	4	–	7
Northern Colorado	2	–	6	3	–	8
Cal Poly	1	–	7	2	–	9
Idaho State	1	–	7	1	–	10
Southern Utah	0	–	8	1	–	10
$ – Conference champion; ^ – FCS playoff participant; Rankings from STATS Poll

The 2021 Eastern Washington Eagles football team represented Eastern Washington University as a member of the Big Sky Conference during the 2021 NCAA Division I FCS football season. Led by fifth-year head coach Aaron Best, the Eagles played their home games at Roos Field in Cheney, Washington.

== Preseason ==
=== Polls ===
On July 26, 2021, during the virtual Big Sky Kickoff, the Eagles were predicted to finish third in the Big Sky by both the coaches and media.

=== Preseason All–Big Sky team ===
The Eagles had four players selected to the preseason all-Big Sky team.

Offense

Eric Barriere – QB

Talolo Limu-Jones – WR

Tristen Taylor – OT

Defense

Mitchell Johnson – DE

== Schedule ==
Date	Time	Opponent	Rank	Site	TV	Result	Attendance
September 2	7:00 p.m.	at UNLV*	No. 11	Allegiant Stadium; Paradise, NV	Stadium	W 35–33 ^{2OT}	21,970
September 11	1:00 p.m.	Central Washington*	No. 7	Roos Field; Cheney, WA	SWX/ESPN+	W 63–14	4,523
September 18	1:00 p.m.	at Western Illinois*	No. 7	Hanson Field; Macomb, IL	ESPN+	W 62–56	5,385
September 25	5:00 p.m.	at Southern Utah	No. 6	Eccles Coliseum; Cedar City, UT	ESPN+	W 50–21	7,096
October 2	7:30 p.m.	No. 4 Montana	No. 6	Roos Field; Cheney, WA (EWU–UM Governors Cup)	ESPN2	W 34–28	7,944
October 9	12:00 p.m.	at Northern Colorado	No. 4	Nottingham Field; Greeley, CO	ESPN+	W 63–17	5,413
October 16	1:00 p.m.	Idaho	No. 2	Roos Field; Cheney, WA	RTNW	W 71–21	5,380
October 23	1:00 p.m.	Weber State	No. 2	Roos Field; Cheney, WA	SWX/ESPN+	L 34–35	5,676
November 6	1:00 p.m.	No. 4 Montana State	No. 5	Roos Field; Cheney, WA	SWX/ESPN+	L 20–23	6,981
November 13	5:00 p.m.	at No. 6 UC Davis	No. 7	UC Davis Health Stadium; Davis, CA	ESPN+	W 38–20	7,344
November 20	2:05 p.m.	at Portland State	No. 5	Hillsboro Stadium; Portland, OR (The Dam Cup)	ESPN+	W 42–28	0
November 27	1:00 p.m.	Northern Iowa*	No. 4	Roos Field; Cheney, WA (NCAA Division I First Round)	ESPN+	W 19–9	3,845
December 3	6:00 p.m.	at No. 5 Montana*	No. 4	Washington–Grizzly Stadium; Missoula, MT (NCAA Division I Second Round)	ESPN+	L 41–57	24,065
*Non-conference game; Rankings from STATS Poll released prior to the game; All times are in Pacific time

== Game summaries ==
=== At UNLV ===
	1	2	3	4	OT	2OT	Total
No. 11 Eagles	0	3	17	0	7	8	35
Rebels	0	6	0	14	7	6	33

=== Central Washington ===
	1	2	3	4	Total
Wildcats	7	0	0	7	14
No. 7 Eagles	18	28	10	7	63

=== At Western Illinois ===
	1	2	3	4	Total
No. 7 Eagles	28	27	7	0	62
Leathernecks	21	0	14	21	56

=== At Southern Utah ===
	1	2	3	4	Total
No. 6 Eagles	9	21	13	7	50
Thunderbirds	7	7	7	0	21

=== No. 4 Montana ===
	1	2	3	4	Total
No. 4 Grizzlies	7	7	7	7	28
No. 6 Eagles	7	3	0	24	34

=== At Northern Colorado ===
	1	2	3	4	Total
No. 4 Eagles	22	21	10	10	63
Bears	3	7	7	0	17

=== Idaho ===
	1	2	3	4	Total
Vandals	7	7	0	7	21
No. 2 Eagles	29	14	14	14	71

=== Weber State ===
	1	2	3	4	Total
Wildcats	0	13	7	15	35
No. 2 Eagles	7	7	7	13	34

=== No. 4 Montana State ===
	1	2	3	4	Total
No. 4 Bobcats	7	9	0	7	23
No. 5 Eagles	13	0	0	7	20

=== At No. 6 UC Davis ===
	1	2	3	4	Total
No. 7 Eagles	0	14	10	14	38
No. 6 Aggies	7	3	7	3	20

=== At Portland State ===
	1	2	3	4	Total
No. 5 Eagles	7	7	21	7	42
Vikings	7	7	7	7	28

== FCS Playoffs ==
=== Northern Iowa–First Round ===
	1	2	3	4	Total
Panthers	0	7	0	2	9
No. 4 Eagles	6	3	7	3	19

=== At No. 5 Montana–Second Round ===
	1	2	3	4	Total
No. 4 Eagles	14	7	7	13	41
No. 5 Grizzlies	10	10	24	13	57

== Ranking movements ==
Ranking movements Legend: ██ Increase in ranking ██ Decrease in ranking ( ) = First-place votes
	Week													
Poll	Pre	1	2	3	4	5	6	7	8	9	10	11	12	Final
STATS	11	7	7	6	6	4	2 (9)	2 (14)	7	5	7	5	4	7
Coaches	14	8	6	6	6	4 (2)	2 (1)	2 (2)	7	5	8	6	6	9
