= 2021 Sacramento State Hornets football team =

American college football season

2021 Sacramento State Hornets football

Big Sky champion

NCAA Division I Second Round, L 19–24 vs. South Dakota State
- Conference: Big Sky Conference

Ranking
- STATS: No. 10
- FCS Coaches: No. 11
- Record: 9–3 (8–0 Big Sky)
- Head coach: Troy Taylor (2nd season)
- Offensive coordinator: Kris Richardson (2nd season)
- Offensive scheme: West Coast
- Defensive coordinator: Andy Thompson (2nd season)
- Base defense: 4–2–5
- Home stadium: Hornet Stadium

2021 Big Sky Conference football standings
	Conf.			Overall
Team	W		L	W		L
No. 10 Sacramento State $^	8	–	0	9	–	3
No. 2 Montana State ^	7	–	1	11	–	3
No. 7 Eastern Washington ^	6	–	2	10	–	3
No. 6 Montana ^	6	–	2	10	–	3
No. 17 UC Davis ^	5	–	3	8	–	4
Weber State	5	–	3	6	–	5
Northern Arizona	4	–	4	5	–	6
Portland State	4	–	4	5	–	6
Idaho	3	–	5	4	–	7
Northern Colorado	2	–	6	3	–	8
Cal Poly	1	–	7	2	–	9
Idaho State	1	–	7	1	–	10
Southern Utah	0	–	8	1	–	10
$ – Conference champion; ^ – FCS playoff participant; Rankings from STATS Poll

The 2021 Sacramento State Hornets football team represented California State University, Sacramento in the 2021 NCAA Division I FCS football season. They were led by second-year head coach Troy Taylor and played their home games at Hornet Stadium. They competed as a member of the Big Sky Conference.

== Preseason ==
=== Big Sky preseason poll ===
On July 26, 2021, during the virtual Big Sky Kickoff, the Hornets were predicted to finish fifth in the Big Sky by both the coaches and media.

=== Preseason All–Big Sky team ===
The Hornets had two players selected to the preseason all-Big Sky team.

Offense

Elijah Dotson – RB

Marshel Martin – TE

== Schedule ==
Date	Time	Opponent	Rank	Site	TV	Result	Attendance
September 4	6:00 p.m.	at Dixie State*		Greater Zion Stadium; St. George, UT	ESPN+	W 19–7	6,656
September 11	6:00 p.m.	No. 21 Northern Iowa*		Hornet Stadium; Sacramento, CA	KMAX-TV	L 16–34	8,067
September 18	1:00 p.m.	at California*		California Memorial Stadium; Berkeley, CA	P12N	L 30–42	31,982
September 25	12:00 p.m.	at Idaho State		Holt Arena; Pocatello, ID	ESPN+	W 23–21	5,997
October 9	6:00 p.m.	Southern Utah		Hornet Stadium; Sacramento, CA	KMAX-TV	W 41–20	6,244
October 16	12:00 p.m.	at No. 5 Montana		Washington–Grizzly Stadium; Missoula, MT	ESPN+	W 28–21	24,305
October 23	6:00 p.m.	Northern Arizona^{†}	No. 19	Hornet Stadium; Sacramento, CA	KMAX-TV	W 44–0	8,210
October 30	12:00 p.m.	at Northern Colorado	No. 15	Nottingham Field; Greeley, CO	ESPN+	W 27–24	4,068
November 6	6:00 p.m.	Cal Poly	No. 16	Hornet Stadium; Sacramento, CA	KMAX-TV	W 41–9	7,287
November 13	6:00 p.m.	Portland State	No. 12	Hornet Stadium; Sacramento, CA	KMAX-TV	W 49–20	5,848
November 20	1:00 p.m.	at No. 10 UC Davis	No. 11	UC Davis Health Stadium; Davis, CA (Causeway Classic)	ESPN+	W 27–7	12,315
December 4	6:00 p.m.	No. 11 South Dakota State*	No. 8	Hornet Stadium; Sacramento, CA (NCAA Division I Second Round)	ESPN+	L 19–24	10,031
*Non-conference game; ^{†}Homecoming; Rankings from STATS Poll released prior to the game; All times are in Pacific time

== Roster ==
2021 Sacramento State Hornets football team roster
Players
Coaches
Offense

Pos.	#	Name	Class
WR	0	Marqui Johnson	Fr
QB	1	Kaiden Bennett	Fr
QB	2	Dorian Hale	Fr
WR	3	Chris Miller	Fr
WR	4	Isaiah Gable	Sr
WR	5	Devin Gandy	Fr
WR	6	Jordan Chin	Sr
WR	8	Jared Gipson	Fr
RB	9	Marcus Fulcher	So
QB	10	Asher O'Hara	Jr
WR	11	Parker Clayton	So
QB	12	Jake Dunniway	Jr
TE	16	Marshel Martin IV	So
WR	17	Dewey Cotton	Jr
WR	18	Xavier Mason	Fr
RB	21	BJ Perkinson	Sr
RB	23	Michael Johnson	Fr
RB	25	Elijah Tau-Tolliver	Fr
WR	26	Hunter Hall	Fr
RB	31	Elijah Gable	Fr
RB	32	Cameron Skattebo	Fr
RB	33	Elijah Dotson	Sr
RB	37	Nick Wyatt	Fr
OL	51	Don Long	Jr
OL	52	Ivan Garza	Fr
OL	59	Nathan Mejia	Fr
OL	61	Paula Hafoka	Fr
OL	62	Kenndel Riley	Fr
OL	64	Aidan Meek	Fr
OL	65	Josh Reba	Jr
OL	67	Parker Kernek	So
OL	68	Sawyer Hays	Fr
OL	70	Daniel Bradbury	So
OL	71	Troy Stiefel	Jr
OL	72	Jackson Slater	Fr
OL	73	Ray Matelau	So
OL	74	Kaden Richardson	Fr
OL	75	Joe Wagner	Fr
OL	76	Tyler Perez	Fr
OL	77	Kooper Richardson	Sr
OL	78	Brandon Weldon	Jr
OL	79	Thomas Parker	Sr
WR	80	Lucas Triplett	Sr
TE	81	Tao McClinton	Jr
WR	82	Joey Lewis	Sr
TE	83	Jarrell Anderson	Jr
WR	84	Pierre Williams	Jr
TE	85	Cobe Weeks	Fr
WR	86	Ty Smith	Fr
TE	87	Will Schalde	Fr
TE	88	Charlie McBride	So
TE	89	Gary Morrison	Fr

Defense

Pos.	#	Name	Class
CB	1	Munchie Filer III	Sr
CB	2	Patrick Dean	Fr
CB	3	Prince Washington	Sr
LB	4	Taylor Powell	Sr
LB	5	Marcus Hawkins	Sr
S	7	Cameron Broussard	Fr
CB	9	Elijah King	Fr
S	10	Malik Jeter	Sr
NB	13	Isaiah Capoocia	Jr
S	14	Marcus Aponte	So
NB	15	Marte Mapu	Jr
CB	19	Tykee Woods	So
S	20	Abel Ordaz	Jr
S	22	Eian Moore	Jr
S	23	Kainalu Martin	Jr
S	24	Davion Ross	So
S	27	Gavin Davis-Smith	Fr
S	28	Kameron Rocha	Fr
NB	29	Javion Macias	Jr
LB	30	Armon Bailey	Jr
NB	31	Josiah Jacobs	Fr
CB	32	Donovan Roebuck	Fr
DL	34	Ariel Ngata	Jr
CB	35	Dominick Sanders	Jr
CB	36	Jalin Speed	Fr
CB	38	DJ Houston	Fr
LB	39	Jeremy Harris	So
DL	40	Killian Rosko	Jr
DL	41	DeShawn Lynch	Fr
DL	42	Marshaun Hunter	So
DL	44	Josiah Erickson	Sr
DL	45	Xavier Williams	Fr
NB	46	Jace O'Hara	So
NB	47	Darian Pollard	Fr
LB	48	Dylan Jorge	Fr
LB	49	Kurt Landers, Jr.	Fr
LB	50	Oge Feo	Fr
LB	53	Justin Houlihan	So
LB	54	Tali Finefeuiaki	Jr
DL	55	Jett Stanley	So
DL	56	Brandon Knott	Fr
LB	57	Zach Corbitt	Fr
LB	58	Mitchell Wolfe	Fr
DL	66	Billy Lutui	Fr
DL	90	Josh Cooper	So
DL	92	Jayce Gamble	Fr
DL	93	Tyler Hardeman	So
DL	94	Wyatt Hjelm	Sr
DL	95	Mason Brosseau	Fr
DL	96	John Carey III	Fr
DL	97	Carter Sullivan	Fr
DL	99	Leke Fashola	Fr

Special teams

Pos.	#	Name	Class
K	18	Josh Baron	Fr
LS	60	Robert Fiene	So
LS	63	Dustin Cognetti	Jr
P	69	Eric Fellenzer	So
P	91	Sam Clark	Jr
P	96	Connor Stutz	Fr
K	98	Kyle Sentkowski	Jr

Head coach

- Troy Taylor

Coordinators/assistant coaches

- Kris Richardson (Assistant head coach / offensive coordinator)
- Andy Thompson (Defensive coordinator / linebackers)
- Malcolm Agnew (Running backs)
- Sam Cole (Safeties)
- Bobby Fresques (Quarterbacks)
- Jeremy LaPan (Special teams coordinator / tight ends)
- Tyler Osborne (Wide receivers)
- Kraig Paulson (Defensive line)
- Cherokee Valeria (Defensive passing game coordinator / cornerbacks / pro liaison)

Legend

- (C) Team captain
- (S) Suspended
- (I) Ineligible
- Injured
- Redshirt

Roster

== Game summaries ==
=== At Dixie State ===
	1	2	3	4	Total
Hornets	5	7	7	0	19
Trailblazers	0	7	0	0	7

=== No. 21 Northern Iowa ===
	1	2	3	4	Total
No. 21 Panthers	7	0	27	0	34
Hornets	3	6	0	7	16

=== At California ===
	1	2	3	4	Total
Hornets	6	0	14	10	30
Golden Bears	14	7	14	7	42

=== At Idaho State ===
	1	2	3	4	Total
Hornets	7	7	6	3	23
Bengals	7	14	0	0	21

=== Southern Utah ===
	1	2	3	4	Total
Thunderbirds	0	7	6	7	20
Hornets	17	7	7	10	41

=== At Montana ===
	1	2	3	4	Total
Hornets	7	7	14	0	28
No. 5 Grizzlies	0	6	15	0	21

=== Northern Arizona ===
	1	2	3	4	Total
Lumberjacks	0	0	0	0	0
No. 19 Hornets	3	34	0	7	44

=== At Northern Colorado ===
	1	2	3	4	Total
No. 15 Hornets	10	7	3	7	27
Bears	0	7	10	7	24

=== Cal Poly ===
	1	2	3	4	Total
Mustangs	0	9	0	0	9
No. 16 Hornets	14	10	10	7	41

=== Portland State ===
	1	2	3	4	Total
Vikings	0	7	7	6	20
No. 12 Hornets	3	18	14	14	49

=== At No. 10 UC Davis ===
	1	2	3	4	Total
No. 11 Hornets	7	17	3	0	27
No. 10 Aggies	0	0	0	7	7

== Ranking movements ==
Ranking movements Legend: RV = Received votes
	Week														
Poll	Pre	1	2	3	4	5	6	7	8	9	10	11	12	13	Final
STATS FCS	RV	RV													
Coaches	RV														
