= 2021 Weber State Wildcats football team =

American college football season

2021 Weber State Wildcats football
- Conference: Big Sky Conference
- Record: 6–5 (5–3 Big Sky)
- Head coach: Jay Hill (8th season)
- Offensive coordinator: Matt Hammer (2nd season)
- Co-defensive coordinators: Grant Duff (1st season); Joe Dale (1st season)
- Home stadium: Stewart Stadium

2021 Big Sky Conference football standings
	Conf.			Overall
Team	W		L	W		L
No. 10 Sacramento State $^	8	–	0	9	–	3
No. 2 Montana State ^	7	–	1	11	–	3
No. 7 Eastern Washington ^	6	–	2	10	–	3
No. 6 Montana ^	6	–	2	10	–	3
No. 17 UC Davis ^	5	–	3	8	–	4
Weber State	5	–	3	6	–	5
Northern Arizona	4	–	4	5	–	6
Portland State	4	–	4	5	–	6
Idaho	3	–	5	4	–	7
Northern Colorado	2	–	6	3	–	8
Cal Poly	1	–	7	2	–	9
Idaho State	1	–	7	1	–	10
Southern Utah	0	–	8	1	–	10
$ – Conference champion; ^ – FCS playoff participant; Rankings from STATS Poll

The 2021 Weber State Wildcats football team represented Weber State University in the 2021 NCAA Division I FCS football season. The Wildcats were led by eighth-year head coach Jay Hill and played their games at Stewart Stadium as members of the Big Sky Conference.

== Preseason ==
=== Polls ===
On July 26, 2021, during the virtual Big Sky Kickoff, the Wildcats were predicted to finish first in the Big Sky by both the coaches and media.

== Schedule ==
Date	Time	Opponent	Rank	Site	TV	Result	Attendance
September 2	5:30 p.m.	at No. 24 (FBS) Utah*	No. 6	Rice–Eccles Stadium; Salt Lake City, UT	P12N	L 17–40	51,511
September 11	8:00 p.m.	at Dixie State*	No. 10	Zions Bank Stadium; St. George, UT	ESPN+	W 41–3	8,280
September 18	6:00 p.m.	No. 3 James Madison*	No. 9	Stewart Stadium; Ogden, UT	ESPN+	L 24–37	11,222
September 25	6:00 p.m.	No. 12 UC Davis	No. 14	Stewart Stadium; Ogden, UT	ESPN+	L 14–17	6,802
October 2	6:00 pm	at Cal Poly	No. 19	Alex G. Spanos Stadium; San Luis Obispo, CA	ESPN+	W 38–7	7,089
October 15	6:00 p.m.	No. 9 Montana State^{†}	No. 19	Stewart Stadium; Ogden, UT	ESPNU	L 7–13	6,323
October 23	2:00 p.m.	at No. 2 Eastern Washington		Roos Field; Cheney, WA	ESPN+	W 35–34	5,676
October 30	1:00 p.m.	at Idaho State	No. 23	Holt Arena; Pocatello, ID	ESPN+	W 40–17	2,500
November 6	1:00 p.m.	Portland State	No. 24	Stewart Stadium; Ogden, UT	ESPN+	L 18–30	4,433
November 13	2:00 p.m.	at Southern Utah		Eccles Coliseum; Cedar City, UT (Beehive Bowl)	ESPN+	W 62–0	4,045
November 20	1:00 p.m.	Northern Colorado		Stewart Stadium; Ogden, UT	ESPN+	W 48–17	3,242
*Non-conference game; ^{†}Homecoming; Rankings from STATS Poll released prior to the game; All times are in Mountain time

== Game summaries ==
=== At No. 24 (FBS) Utah ===
Weber State at Utah

Team	1	2	3	4	Total
No. 6 Wildcats	7	0	3	7	17
• No. 24 (FBS) Utes	13	6	7	14	40

- Date: September 2, 2021
- Location: Rice–Eccles Stadium
  Salt Lake City, UT
- Game start: 5:31 p.m. MDT
- Elapsed time: 4 hours and 48 minutes
- Game attendance: 51,511
- Game weather: Temperature: 82 °F (28 °C) • Weather: Rain • Wind: NE 1 MPH
- Referee: Mike McCabe
- TV announcers (P12N): Roxy Bernstein (play–by–play) and Lincoln Kennedy (analyst)

Scoring summary
1	08:39	UTAH	Jadon Redding 25–yard field goal (10 plays, 57 yards, 4:43)	UTAH 3–0
1	08:26	WSU	Rashid Shaheed 100–yard kickoff return (Kyle Thompson kick)	WSU 7–3
1	06:07	UTAH	Dalton Kincaid 17–yard pass from Charlie Brewer (Jadon Redding kick) (5 plays, 75 yards, 2:19)	UTAH 10–7
1	02:53	UTAH	Jadon Redding 31–yard field goal (4 plays, 4 yards, 1:29)	UTAH 13–7
2	12:04	UTAH	Tavion Thomas 12–yard run (Jadon Redding kick failed) (3 plays, 31 yards, 1:08)	UTAH 19–7
3	10:31	WSU	Kyle Thompson 25–yard field goal (7 plays, 24 yards, 3:44)	UTAH 19–10
3	04:27	UTAH	Solomon Enis 8–yard pass from Charlie Brewer (Jadon Redding kick) (5 plays, 66 yards, 2:58)	UTAH 26–10
4	08:44	UTAH	Tavion Thomas 14–yard run (Jadon Redding kick) (3 plays, 42 yards, 1:28)	UTAH 33–10
4	07:49	UTAH	Dalton Kincaid 11–yard pass from Cameron Rising (Jadon Redding kick) (2 plays, 29 yards, 0:38)	UTAH 40–10
4	02:43	WSU	Hayden Meacham 2–yard pass from Bronson Barron (Kyle Thompson kick) (12 plays, 75 yards, 5:06)	UTAH 40–17

Statistics	Weber State	Utah
First downs	14	28
Total yards	270	450
Rushing yards	57	188
Passing yards	213	262
Turnovers	3	3
Time of possession	30:24	29:36

Team	Category	Player	Statistics
Weber State	Passing	Bronson Barron	21/33, 213 yards, 1 TD, 1 INT
Weber State	Rushing	Dontae McMillan	7 carries, 39 yards
Weber State	Receiving	Justin Malone	5 receptions, 50 yards
Utah	Passing	Charlie Brewer	19/27, 233 yards, 2 TDs, 1 INT
Utah	Rushing	Tavion Thomas	12 carries, 107 yards, 2 TDs
Utah	Receiving	Dalton Kincaid	4 receptions, 75 yards, 2 TDs

=== At Dixie State ===
	1	2	3	4	Total
No. 10 Wildcats	7	7	13	14	41
Trailblazers	3	0	0	0	3

=== No. 3 James Madison ===
	1	2	3	4	Total
No. 3 Dukes	10	7	10	10	37
No. 9 Wildcats	3	0	7	14	24

=== No. 12 UC Davis ===
	1	2	3	4	Total
No. 12 Aggies	0	7	3	7	17
No. 14 Wildcats	0	7	7	0	14

=== At Cal Poly ===
	1	2	3	4	Total
No. 19 Wildcats	7	21	10	0	38
Mustangs	7	0	0	0	7

=== No. 9 Montana State ===
	1	2	3	4	Total
No. 9 Bobcats	7	0	6	0	13
No. 19 Wildcats	7	0	0	0	7

=== At No. 2 Eastern Washington ===
	1	2	3	4	Total
Wildcats	0	13	7	15	35
No. 2 Eagles	7	7	7	13	34

=== At Idaho State ===
	1	2	3	4	Total
No. 23 Wildcats	10	7	10	13	40
Bengals	0	10	7	0	17

=== Portland State ===
	1	2	3	4	Total
Vikings	0	10	7	13	30
No. 24 Wildcats	7	0	3	8	18

=== At Southern Utah ===
	1	2	3	4	Total
Wildcats	14	31	7	10	62
Thunderbirds	0	0	0	0	0

=== At Northern Colorado ===
	1	2	3	4	Total
Wildcats	3	21	24	0	48
Bears	3	14	0	0	17
