= 2021 Montana Grizzlies football team =

American college football season

2021 Montana Grizzlies football

NCAA Division I Quarterfinal, L 6–28 at James Madison
- Conference: Big Sky Conference

Ranking
- STATS: No. 6
- FCS Coaches: No. 6
- Record: 10–3 (6–2 Big Sky)
- Head coach: Bobby Hauck (11th season)
- Offensive coordinator: Timm Rosenbach (4th season)
- Offensive scheme: Spread
- Defensive coordinator: Kent Baer (3rd season)
- Base defense: 3–3–5
- Home stadium: Washington–Grizzly Stadium

2021 Big Sky Conference football standings
| | Conf. | | | Overall |
| Team | W | | L | W | | L |
|---|---|---|---|---|---|---|
| No. 10 Sacramento State $^ | 8 | – | 0 | 9 | – | 3 |
| No. 2 Montana State ^ | 7 | – | 1 | 11 | – | 3 |
| No. 7 Eastern Washington ^ | 6 | – | 2 | 10 | – | 3 |
| No. 6 Montana ^ | 6 | – | 2 | 10 | – | 3 |
| No. 17 UC Davis ^ | 5 | – | 3 | 8 | – | 4 |
| Weber State | 5 | – | 3 | 6 | – | 5 |
| Northern Arizona | 4 | – | 4 | 5 | – | 6 |
| Portland State | 4 | – | 4 | 5 | – | 6 |
| Idaho | 3 | – | 5 | 4 | – | 7 |
| Northern Colorado | 2 | – | 6 | 3 | – | 8 |
| Cal Poly | 1 | – | 7 | 2 | – | 9 |
| Idaho State | 1 | – | 7 | 1 | – | 10 |
| Southern Utah | 0 | – | 8 | 1 | – | 10 |
$ – Conference champion; ^ – FCS playoff participant; Rankings from STATS Poll

The 2021 Montana Grizzlies football team represented the University of Montana as a member of the Big Sky Conference during the 2021 NCAA Division I FCS football season. The Grizzlies were led by head coach Bobby Hauck, in the fourth season of his current stint and the eleventh overall, as he was head coach from 2003 to 2009. The team played their home games at Washington–Grizzly Stadium in Missoula, Montana.

== Preseason ==
=== Polls ===
On July 26, 2021, during the virtual Big Sky Kickoff, the Grizzlies were predicted to finish second in the Big Sky by both the coaches and media.

=== Preseason All–Big Sky team ===
The Grizzlies had five players selected to the preseason all-Big Sky team.

Offense

Samuel Akem – WR

Conlan Beaver – OT

Defense

Jace Lewis – LB

Robby Hauck – S

Special teams

Matthew O'Donoghue – LS

== Schedule ==
| Date | Time | Opponent | Rank | Site | TV | Result | Attendance |
|---|---|---|---|---|---|---|---|
| September 4 | 6:00 p.m. | at No. 20 (FBS) Washington* | No. 9 | Husky Stadium; Seattle, WA | P12N | W 13–7 | 64,053 |
| September 11 | 6:00 p.m. | Western Illinois* | No. 4 | Washington–Grizzly Stadium; Missoula, MT | KTMF/SWX | W 42–7 | 25,238 |
| September 25 | 1:00 p.m. | Cal Poly^{†} | No. 4 | Washington–Grizzly Stadium; Missoula, MT | KTMF/SWX | W 39–7 | 25,600 |
| October 2 | 8:30 p.m. | at No. 6 Eastern Washington | No. 4 | Roos Field; Cheney, WA (EWU–UM Governors Cup) | ESPN2 | L 28–34 | 7,944 |
| October 9 | 1:00 p.m. | Dixie State* | No. 6 | Washington–Grizzly Stadium; Missoula, MT | KTMF/SWX | W 31–14 | 23,434 |
| October 16 | 1:00 p.m. | Sacramento State | No. 5 | Washington–Grizzly Stadium; Missoula, MT | KTMF/SWX | L 21–28 | 24,305 |
| October 23 | 2:00 p.m. | at Idaho | No. 11 | Kibbie Dome; Moscow, ID (Little Brown Stein) | KTMF/SWX | W 34–14 | 6,059 |
| October 30 | 12:00 p.m. | Southern Utah | No. 11 | Washington–Grizzly Stadium; Missoula, MT | RTNW | W 20–19 | 22,587 |
| November 6 | 12:00 p.m. | at Northern Colorado | No. 11 | Nottingham Field; Greeley, CO | ESPN+ | W 35–0 | 4,987 |
| November 13 | 1:00 p.m. | at Northern Arizona | No. 9 | Walkup Skydome; Flagstaff, AZ | KTMF/KULR | W 30–3 | 6,228 |
| November 20 | 12:00 p.m. | No. 3 Montana State | No. 7 | Washington–Grizzly Stadium; Missoula, MT (Brawl of the Wild) | RTNW | W 29–10 | 26,856 |
| December 3 | 7:00 p.m. | No. 4 Eastern Washington* | No. 5 | Washington–Grizzly Stadium; Missoula, MT (NCAA Division I Second Round) | ESPN+ | W 57–41 | 24,065 |
| December 10 | 5:00 p.m. | at No. 2 James Madison* | No. 5 | Bridgeforth Stadium; Harrisonburg, VA (NCAA Division I Quarterfinal) | ESPN2 | L 6–28 | 14,690 |
*Non-conference game; ^{†}Homecoming; Rankings from STATS Poll released prior to the game; All times are in Mountain time

== Game summaries ==
=== At No. 20 (FBS) Washington ===
Montana Grizzlies vs Washington Huskies – Game summary

| Quarter | 1 | 2 | 3 | 4 | Total |
|---|---|---|---|---|---|
| No. 9 Grizzlies | 3 | 0 | 0 | 10 | 13 |
| No. 20 (FBS) Huskies | 7 | 0 | 0 | 0 | 7 |

at Husky Stadium • Seattle, WA

- Date: September 4, 2021
- Game time: 5:00 p.m. PDT
- Game weather: 77 °F (25 °C) Sunny
- Game attendance: 64,053
- Referee: Matthew Richards
- TV announcers (P12N): J. B. Long (play-by-play) and Max Browne (analyst)

Game information

First quarter

- UW – Dylan Morris 1-yard run (Peyton Henry kick), 10:09. Washington 7–0. Drive: 9 plays, 78 yards, 4:45.
- MONT – Kevin Macias 26-yard field goal, 7:08. Washington 7–3. Drive: 8 plays, 66 yards, 3:01.

Second quarter

- No scoring.

Third quarter

- No scoring.

Fourth quarter

- MONT – Camron Humphrey 4-yard run (Kevin Macias kick), 10:35. Montana 10–7. Drive: 10 plays, 69 yards, 5:00.
- MONT – Kevin Macias 22-yard field goal, 2:54. Montana 13–7. Drive: 11 plays, 42 yards, 6:05.

Top passers

- MONT – Camron Humphrey – 12/23, 105 yards
- UW – Dylan Morris – 27/46, 226 yards, 3 int

Top rushers

- MONT – Xavier Harris – 15 rushes, 70 yards
- UW – Richard Newton – 17 rushes, 62 yards

Top receivers

- MONT – Mitch Roberts – 2 receptions, 29 yards
- UW – Cade Otton – 8 receptions, 82 yards

The Grizzlies upset Washington 13-7, becoming the 5th FCS team to beat a Top-25 FBS team.

=== Western Illinois ===
| | 1 | 2 | 3 | 4 | Total |
|---|---|---|---|---|---|
| Leathernecks | 0 | 7 | 0 | 0 | 7 |
| No. 4 Grizzlies | 7 | 14 | 14 | 7 | 42 |

=== Cal Poly ===
| | 1 | 2 | 3 | 4 | Total |
|---|---|---|---|---|---|
| Mustangs | 0 | 0 | 0 | 7 | 7 |
| No. 4 Grizzlies | 15 | 3 | 21 | 0 | 39 |

=== At No. 6 Eastern Washington ===
| | 1 | 2 | 3 | 4 | Total |
|---|---|---|---|---|---|
| No. 4 Grizzlies | 7 | 7 | 7 | 7 | 28 |
| No. 6 Eagles | 7 | 3 | 0 | 24 | 34 |

=== Dixie State ===
| | 1 | 2 | 3 | 4 | Total |
|---|---|---|---|---|---|
| Trailblazers | 0 | 0 | 0 | 14 | 14 |
| No. 6 Grizzlies | 0 | 3 | 14 | 14 | 31 |

=== Sacramento State ===
| | 1 | 2 | 3 | 4 | Total |
|---|---|---|---|---|---|
| Hornets | 7 | 7 | 14 | 0 | 28 |
| No. 5 Grizzlies | 0 | 6 | 15 | 0 | 21 |

=== At Idaho ===
| | 1 | 2 | 3 | 4 | Total |
|---|---|---|---|---|---|
| No. 11 Grizzlies | 7 | 13 | 13 | 7 | 40 |
| Vandals | 7 | 0 | 0 | 7 | 14 |

=== Southern Utah ===
| | 1 | 2 | 3 | 4 | Total |
|---|---|---|---|---|---|
| Thunderbirds | 0 | 3 | 13 | 3 | 19 |
| No. 11 Grizzlies | 0 | 10 | 7 | 3 | 20 |

=== At Northern Colorado ===
| | 1 | 2 | 3 | 4 | Total |
|---|---|---|---|---|---|
| No. 11 Grizzlies | 14 | 7 | 14 | 0 | 35 |
| Bears | 0 | 0 | 0 | 0 | 0 |

=== At Northern Arizona ===
| | 1 | 2 | 3 | 4 | Total |
|---|---|---|---|---|---|
| No. 9 Grizzlies | 0 | 13 | 7 | 10 | 30 |
| Lumberjacks | 0 | 0 | 3 | 0 | 3 |

=== No. 3 Montana State ===
| | 1 | 2 | 3 | 4 | Total |
|---|---|---|---|---|---|
| No. 3 Bobcats | 3 | 0 | 0 | 7 | 10 |
| No. 7 Grizzlies | 10 | 6 | 10 | 3 | 29 |

=== No. 4 Eastern Washington ===
| | 1 | 2 | 3 | 4 | Total |
|---|---|---|---|---|---|
| No. 4 Eagles | 14 | 7 | 7 | 13 | 41 |
| No. 5 Grizzlies | 10 | 10 | 24 | 13 | 57 |

== FCS Playoffs ==
=== No. 4 Eastern Washington–Second Round ===
| | 1 | 2 | 3 | 4 | Total |
|---|---|---|---|---|---|
| No. 4 Eagles | 14 | 7 | 7 | 13 | 41 |
| No. 5 Grizzlies | 10 | 10 | 24 | 13 | 57 |

=== At No. 3 James Madison–Quarterfinal ===
| | 1 | 2 | 3 | 4 | Total |
|---|---|---|---|---|---|
| No. 5 Grizzlies | 3 | 0 | 0 | 3 | 6 |
| No. 3 Dukes | 7 | 7 | 7 | 7 | 28 |

== Ranking movements ==
Ranking movements Legend: ██ Increase in ranking ██ Decrease in ranking ( ) = First-place votes
| | Week | | | | | | | | | | | | | |
| Poll | Pre | 1 | 2 | 3 | 4 | 5 | 6 | 7 | 8 | 9 | 10 | 11 | 12 | Final |
|---|---|---|---|---|---|---|---|---|---|---|---|---|---|---|
| STATS FCS | 9 | 4 (5) | 4 (3) | 4 (2) | 4 (3) | 6 | 5 | 11 | 11 | 11 | 9 | 7 | 5 | 6 |
| Coaches | 9 | 5 (1) | 5 | 4 | 4 | 6 | 6 | 12 | 11 | 10 | 9 | 7 | 5 | 6 |
