= 2021 NCAA Division I FCS football rankings =

Rankings for the 2021 NCAA Division I FCS football season

- Season: 2021
- Postseason: Single-elimination
- Preseason No. 1: Sam Houston State
- National champions: North Dakota State
- Conference with most teams in final poll: MVFC (6)

The 2021 National Collegiate Athletic Association (NCAA) Division I Football Championship Subdivision (FCS) football rankings consists of two human polls, in addition to various publications' preseason polls. Unlike the Football Bowl Subdivision (FBS), college football's governing body, the NCAA, bestows the national championship title through a 24-team tournament. The following weekly polls determine the top 25 teams at the NCAA Division I Football Championship Subdivision level of college football for the 2021 season. The STATS Poll is voted by media members while the Coaches Poll is determined by coaches at the FCS level.

== Legend ==
Legend
	Increase in ranking
	Decrease in ranking
	Not ranked previous week
	Selected for NCAA FCS Playoffs
(Italics)	Number of first place votes
(#–#)	Win–loss record
т	Tied with team above or below also with this symbol

== STATS Poll ==
	Preseason August 18	Week 1 September 6	Week 2 September 13	Week 3 September 20	Week 4 September 27	Week 5 October 4	Week 6 October 11	Week 7 October 18	Week 8 October 25	Week 9 November 1	Week 10 November 8	Week 11 November 15	Week 12 November 22	Final January 10	
1.	Sam Houston State (39)	Sam Houston State (1–0) (32)	Sam Houston State (2–0) (33)	Sam Houston State (2–0) (31)	Sam Houston State (3–0) (32)	Sam Houston State (4–0) (29)	Sam Houston State (5–0) (39)	Sam Houston State (5–0) (35)	Sam Houston State (6–0) (44)	Sam Houston State (7–0) (40)	Sam Houston State (8–0) (50)	Sam Houston State (9–0) (50)	Sam Houston State (10–0) (49)	North Dakota State (14–1) (50)	1.
2.	James Madison (8)	South Dakota State (1–0) (11)	South Dakota State (2–0) (9)	South Dakota State (2–0) (8)	South Dakota State (3–0) (10)	South Dakota State (4–0) (15)	Eastern Washington (6–0) (9)	Eastern Washington (7–0) (14)	North Dakota State (7–0) (6)	North Dakota State (8–0) (10)	James Madison (8–1)	James Madison (9–1)	James Madison (10–1)	Montana State (12–3)	2.
3.	South Dakota State (4)	James Madison (1–0) (2)	James Madison (2–0) (5)	James Madison (3–0) (9)	James Madison (3–0) (5)	James Madison (4–0) (6)	North Dakota State (5–0) (2)	North Dakota State (6–0) (1)	Southern Illinois (6–1)	James Madison (7–1)	Montana State (8–1)	Montana State (9–1)	North Dakota State (10–1) (1)	James Madison (12–2)	3.
4.	North Dakota State	Montana (1–0) (5)	Montana (2–0) (3)	Montana (2–0) (2)	Montana (3–0) (3)	Eastern Washington (5–0)	Southern Illinois (5–1)	Southern Illinois (6–1)	Villanova (6–1)	Montana State (7–1)	South Dakota State (7–2)	North Dakota State (9–1)	Eastern Washington (9–2)	South Dakota State (11–4)	4.
5.	Delaware	North Dakota State (1–0)	North Dakota State (2–0)	North Dakota State (3–0)	North Dakota State (3–0)	North Dakota State (4–0)	Montana (4–1)	Villanova (5–1)	James Madison (6–1)	Eastern Washington (7–1)	North Dakota State (8–1)	Eastern Washington (8–2)	Montana (9–2)	Sam Houston State (11–1)	5.
6.	Weber State	Delaware (1–0)	Delaware (2–0)	Eastern Washington (3–0)	Eastern Washington (4–0)	Montana (3–1)	Villanova (4–1)	South Dakota State (5–1)	Montana State (7–1)	Southeastern Louisiana (7–1)	UC Davis (8–1)	Villanova (8–2)	Villanova (9–2)	Montana (10–3)	6.
7.	Southern Illinois	Eastern Washington (1–0)	Eastern Washington (2–0)	Southern Illinois (2–1)	Southern Illinois (3–1)	UC Davis (5–0)	South Dakota State (4–1)	James Madison (5–1)	Eastern Washington (7–1)	Southern Illinois (6–2)	Eastern Washington (7–2)	Montana (8–2)	Montana State (9–2)	Eastern Washington (10–3)	7.
8.	North Dakota	Southern Illinois (1–0)	Southern Illinois (1–1)	Delaware (2–1)	UC Davis (4–0)	Southern Illinois (4–1)	James Madison (4–1)	Montana State (6–1)	Southeastern Louisiana (6–1)	UC Davis (7–1)	Villanova (7–2)	East Tennessee State (9–1)	Sacramento State (9–2)	Villanova (10–3)	8.
9.	Montana	North Dakota (1–0)	Weber State (1–1)	Jacksonville State (2–1)	Delaware (2–1)	Delaware (3–1)	Montana State (5–1)	Southeastern Louisiana (5–1)	UC Davis (7–1)	South Dakota State (6–2)	Montana (7–2)	Kennesaw State (9–1)	East Tennessee State (10–1)	East Tennessee State (11–2)	9.
10.	Jacksonville State	Weber State (0–1)	Jacksonville State (1–1)	North Dakota (2–1)	North Dakota (2–1)	Montana State (4–1)	East Tennessee State (6–0)	UC Davis (6–1)	South Dakota State (5–2)	Villanova (6–2)	Kennesaw State (8–1)	UC Davis (8–2)	Kennesaw State (10–1)	Sacramento State (9–3)	10.
11.	Eastern Washington	Montana State (0–1)	North Dakota (1–1)	Villanova (3–0)	Montana State (3–1)	Villanova (3–1)	Southeastern Louisiana (4–1)	Montana (4–2)	Montana (5–2)	Montana (6–2)	East Tennessee State (8–1)	Sacramento State (8–2)	South Dakota State (8–3)	Kennesaw State (11–2)	11.
12.	Montana State	Villanova (1–0)	Villanova (2–0)	UC Davis (3–0)	Villanova (3–1)	East Tennessee State (5–0)	Rhode Island (5–0)	Kennesaw State (5–1)	Kennesaw State (6–1)	Kennesaw State (7–1)	Sacramento State (7–2)	South Dakota State (7–3)	Missouri State (8–3)	Incarnate Word (10–3)	12.
13.	Monmouth	Southeastern Louisiana (1–0)	Montana State (1–1)	Montana State (2–1)	East Tennessee State (4–0)	North Dakota (2–2)	UC Davis (5–1)	UT Martin (5–1)	East Tennessee State (7–1) т	Northern Iowa (5–3)	UT Martin (8–1)	UT Martin (9–1)	Incarnate Word (9–2)	UT Martin (10–3)	13.
14.	Central Arkansas	UC Davis (1–0)	UC Davis (2–0)	Weber State (1–2)	Southeastern Louisiana (2–1)	Southeastern Louisiana (3–1)	Delaware (3–2)	East Tennessee State (6–1)	UT Martin (6–1) т	East Tennessee State (7–1)	Southeastern Louisiana (7–2)	Missouri State (7–3)	UC Davis (8–3)	Missouri State (8–4)	14.
15.	Southeastern Louisiana	East Tennessee State (1–0)	Southeastern Louisiana (1–1)	East Tennessee State (3–0)	Northern Iowa (2–1)	Missouri State (3–1)	Kennesaw State (4–1)	South Dakota (5–2)	Sacramento State (5–2)	UT Martin (7–1)	Southern Illinois (6–3)	Southeastern Louisiana (8–2)	Jackson State (10–1)	Southeastern Louisiana (9–4)	15.
16.	Villanova	Jacksonville State (0–1)	East Tennessee State (2–0)	Southeastern Louisiana (2–1)	Missouri State (2–1)	Northern Iowa (3–1)	Northern Iowa (3–2)	Incarnate Word (5–1)	Northern Iowa (4–3)	Sacramento State (6–2)	Missouri State (6–3)	South Dakota (7–3)	UT Martin (9–2)	Southern Illinois (8–5)	16.
17.	VMI	Austin Peay (1–0)	Missouri State (1–1)	Northern Iowa (2–1)	Jacksonville State (2–2)	Kennesaw State (3–1)	UT Martin (4–1)	Missouri State (4–2)	Missouri State (4–3)	Missouri State (5–3)	Incarnate Word (7–2)	Southern Illinois (7–3)	South Dakota (7–4)	UC Davis (8–4)	17.
18.	Chattanooga	VMI (1–0)	Northern Iowa (1–1)	Missouri State (1–1)	VMI (3–1)	Rhode Island (4–0)	Incarnate Word (4–1)	Rhode Island (5–1)	VMI (5–2)	VMI (6–2)	Jackson State (8–1)	Incarnate Word (8–2)	Southeastern Louisiana (8–3)	South Dakota (7–5)	18.
19.	Kennesaw State	Central Arkansas (0–1)	Austin Peay (1–1)	Austin Peay (2–1)	Weber State (1–3)	Weber State (2–3)	Weber State (2–3)	Sacramento State (4–2)	Princeton (6–0)	Jackson State (7–1)	South Dakota (6–3)	Jackson State (9–1)	Dartmouth (9–1)	Holy Cross (10–3)	19.
20.	Austin Peay	Monmouth (0–1)	Monmouth (1–1)	Monmouth (2–1)	Kennesaw State (2–1)	Incarnate Word (4–1)	Missouri State (3–2)	Northern Iowa (3–3)	Jackson State (6–1)	Princeton (7–0) т	Northern Iowa (5–4)	Dartmouth (8–1)	Stephen F. Austin (8–3)	Dartmouth (9–1)	20.
21.	Northern Iowa	Northern Iowa (0–1)	Richmond (2–0)	New Hampshire (3–0)	Rhode Island (3–0)	UT Martin (3–1)	South Dakota (4–2)	VMI (5–2)	South Dakota (5–3)	William & Mary (6–2) т	VMI (6–3)	Mercer (7–2)	Southern Illinois (7–4)	Stephen F. Austin (8–4)	21.
22.	Nicholls	Kennesaw State (1–0)	VMI (1–1)	VMI (2–1)	Richmond (2–2)	New Hampshire (3–2)	North Dakota (2–3)	Princeton (5–0)	Incarnate Word (5–2)	Incarnate Word (6–2)	Chattanooga (6–3) т	Stephen F. Austin (7–3)	Florida A&M (9–2)	Jackson State (11–2)	22.
23.	UC Davis	Missouri State (0–1)	New Hampshire (2–0)	Kennesaw State (2–1)	UT Martin (3–1)	Stephen F. Austin (3–2)	New Hampshire (3–2)	Delaware (3–3)	Weber State (3–4)	South Dakota (5–3)	Dartmouth (7–1) т	Florida A&M (8–2)	Princeton (9–1)	Northern Iowa (6–6)	23.
24.	Missouri State	Holy Cross (1–0)	Kennesaw State (1–1)	Richmond (2–1)	Incarnate Word (3–1)	Jacksonville State (2–3)	Jacksonville State (3–3)	Jackson State (5–1)	Rhode Island (5–2)	Weber State (4–4)	Prairie View A&M (7–1)	Princeton (8–1)	Holy Cross (9–2)	Princeton (9–1)	24.
25.	North Carolina A&T	Richmond (1–0)	Central Arkansas (0–2)	Central Arkansas (1–2)	New Hampshire (3–1)	Nicholls (2–2)	Princeton (4–0)	Dartmouth (5–0)	Eastern Kentucky (5–2)	Eastern Kentucky (6–2)	William & Mary (6–3)	Rhode Island (7–3)	Mercer (7–3)	Florida A&M (9–3)	25.
	Preseason August 18	Week 1 September 6	Week 2 September 13	Week 3 September 20	Week 4 September 27	Week 5 October 4	Week 6 October 11	Week 7 October 18	Week 8 October 25	Week 9 November 1	Week 10 November 8	Week 11 November 15	Week 12 November 22	Final January 10	
		Dropped: No. 18 Chattanooga; No. 22 Nicholls; No. 25 North Carolina A&T	Dropped: No. 24 Holy Cross	None	Dropped: No. 19 Austin Peay; No. 20 Monmouth; No. 25 Central Arkansas	Dropped: No. 18 VMI; No. 22 Richmond	Dropped: No. 23 Stephen F. Austin; No. 25 Nicholls	Dropped: No. 19 Weber State; No. 22 North Dakota; No. 23 New Hampshire; No. 24 Jacksonville State	Dropped: No. 23 Delaware; No. 25 Dartmouth	Dropped: No. 24 Rhode Island	Dropped: No. 20т Princeton; No. 24 Weber State; No. 25 Eastern Kentucky	Dropped: No. 20 Northern Iowa; No. 21 VMI; No. 22т Chattanooga; No. 24 Prairie View A&M; No. 25 William & Mary	Dropped: No. 25 Rhode Island	Dropped: No. 25 Mercer	

== Coaches Poll ==
	Preseason August 16	Week 1 September 7	Week 2 September 13	Week 3 September 20	Week 4 September 27	Week 5 October 4	Week 6 October 11	Week 7 October 18	Week 8 October 25, 2021	Week 9 November 1	Week 10 November 8	Week 11 November 15	Week 12 November 22	Final January 10, 2022	
1.	Sam Houston State (18)	Sam Houston State (1–0) (23)	Sam Houston State (2–0) (25)	Sam Houston State (2–0) (24)	Sam Houston State (3–0) (26)	Sam Houston State (4–0) (24)	Sam Houston State (5–0) (27)	Sam Houston State (5–0) (26)	Sam Houston State (6–0) (27)	Sam Houston State (7–0) (27)	Sam Houston State (8–0) (28)	Sam Houston State (9–0) (27)	Sam Houston State (10–0) (27)	North Dakota State (14–1) (24)	1.
2.	James Madison (9)	James Madison (1–0) (1)	James Madison (2–0) (1)	James Madison (3–0) (3)	James Madison (3–0) (1)	James Madison (4–0) (1)	Eastern Washington (6–0) (1)	Eastern Washington (7–0) (2)	North Dakota State (7–0)	North Dakota State (8–0)	James Madison (8–1)	James Madison (9–1)	James Madison (10–1)	Montana State (12–3)	2.
3.	North Dakota State	South Dakota State (1–0) (3)	South Dakota State (2–0) (2)	South Dakota State (2–0) (1)	South Dakota State (3–0) (1)	South Dakota State (4–0) (1)	North Dakota State (5–0)	North Dakota State (6–0)	Southern Illinois (6–1)	James Madison (7–1)	Montana State (8–1)	Montana State (9–1) (1)	North Dakota State (10–1)	James Madison (12–2)	3.
4.	South Dakota State (1)	North Dakota State (1–0)	North Dakota State (2–0)	Montana (2–0)	Montana (3–0)	Eastern Washington (5–0) (2)	Southern Illinois (5–1)	Southern Illinois (6–1)	Villanova (6–1)	Montana State (7–1)	UC Davis (8–1)	North Dakota State (9–1)	Kennesaw State (10–1)	Sam Houston State (11–1)	4.
5.	Delaware	Montana (1–0) (1)	Montana (2–0)	North Dakota State (3–0)	North Dakota State (4–0)	North Dakota State (4–0)	Villanova (4–1)	Villanova (5–1)	James Madison (6–1)	Eastern Washington (7–1)	Kennesaw State (8–1)	Kennesaw State (9–1)	Montana (9–2)	South Dakota State (11–4)	5.
6.	Weber State	Delaware (1–0)	Eastern Washington (2–0)	Eastern Washington (3–0)	Eastern Washington (4–0)	Montana (3–1)	Montana (4–1)	James Madison (5–1)	Montana State (7–1)	Southeastern Louisiana (7–1)	North Dakota State (8–1)	Eastern Washington (8–2)	Eastern Washington (9–2)	Montana (10–3)	6.
7.	North Dakota	North Dakota (1–0)	Delaware (2–0)	Villanova (3–0)	Southern Illinois (3–1)	Southern Illinois (4–1)	James Madison (4–1)	South Dakota State (5–1)	Eastern Washington (7–1)	UC Davis (7–1)	South Dakota State (7–2)	Montana (8–2)	Villanova (9–2)	East Tennessee State (11–2)	7.
8.	Jacksonville State	Eastern Washington (1–0)	Weber State (1–1)	Southern Illinois (2–1)	UC Davis (4–0)	UC Davis (5–0)	South Dakota State (4–1)	Montana State (6–1)	Southeastern Louisiana (6–1)	Kennesaw State (7–1)	Eastern Washington (7–2)	UT Martin (9–1)	East Tennessee State (10–1)	Villanova (10–3)	8.
9.	Montana	Southern Illinois (1–0)	Southern Illinois (1–1) т	Jacksonville State (2–1)	Villanova (3–1)	Villanova (3–1)	Montana State (5–1)	Southeastern Louisiana (5–1)	UC Davis (7–1)	Southern Illinois (6–2)	Montana (7–2)	Villanova (8–2)	Montana State (9–2)	Eastern Washington (10–3)	9.
10.	Southern Illinois	Weber State (0–1)	Villanova (2–0) т	UC Davis (3–0)	Delaware (2–1)	Delaware (3–1)	East Tennessee State (6–0)	UC Davis (6–1)	Kennesaw State (6–1)	Montana (6–2)	UT Martin (8–1)	East Tennessee State (9–1)	Missouri State (8–3)	Kennesaw State (11–2)	10.
11.	Montana State	Villanova (1–0)	Jacksonville State (1–1)	Delaware (2–1)	North Dakota (2–1)	Montana State (4–1)	Southeastern Louisiana (4–1)	Kennesaw State (5–1)	Montana (5–2)	UT Martin (7–1)	Villanova (7–2)	UC Davis (8–2)	South Dakota State (8–3)	Sacramento State (9–3)	11.
12.	Monmouth	UC Davis (1–0)	UC Davis (2–0)	Montana State (2–1)	Montana State (3–1)	Northern Iowa (3–1)	UC Davis (5–1)	Montana (4–2)	UT Martin (6–1)	South Dakota State (6–2)	East Tennessee State (8–1)	Southeastern Louisiana (8–2)	Sacramento State (9–2)	UT Martin (10–3)	12.
13.	Central Arkansas	Montana State (0–1)	Montana State (1–1)	North Dakota (2–1)	Northern Iowa (2–1)	East Tennessee State (5–0)	Kennesaw State (4–1)	UT Martin (5–1)	South Dakota State (5–2)	Villanova (6–2)	Southeastern Louisiana (7–2)	South Dakota State (7–3)	UT Martin (9–2)	Incarnate Word (10–3)	13.
14.	Eastern Washington	Southeastern Louisiana (1–0)	North Dakota (1–1)	Northern Iowa (2–1)	East Tennessee State (4–0)	Southeastern Louisiana (3–1)	Rhode Island (5–0)	East Tennessee State (6–1)	East Tennessee State (7–1)	East Tennessee State (7–1)	Missouri State (6–3)	Missouri State (7–3)	Jackson State (10–1)	Missouri State (8–4)	14.
15.	Villanova	Northern Iowa (0–1)	Northern Iowa (1–1)	Weber State (1–2)	Southeastern Louisiana (2–1)	North Dakota (2–2)	Delaware (3–2)	South Dakota (5–2)	Princeton (6–0)	Northern Iowa (5–3)	Jackson State (8–1)	Southern Illinois (7–3)	Incarnate Word (9–2)	Southeastern Louisiana (9–4)	15.
16.	Northern Iowa	Central Arkansas (0–1)	Southeastern Louisiana (1–1)	Southeastern Louisiana (2–1)	Missouri State (2–1)	Missouri State (3–1)	UT Martin (4–1)	Harvard (5–0)	Jackson State (6–1)	Princeton (7–0)	Southern Illinois (6–3)	South Dakota (7–3)	UC Davis (8–3)	UC Davis (8–4)	16.
17.	Southeastern Louisiana	Jacksonville State (0–1)	East Tennessee State (2–0)	East Tennessee State (3–0)	Jacksonville State (2–2)	Kennesaw State (3–1)	Northern Iowa (3–2)	Princeton (5–0)	Northern Iowa (4–3)	Jackson State (7–1)	South Dakota (6–3)	Jackson State (9–1)	Southeastern Louisiana (8–3)	Southern Illinois (8–5)	17.
18.	Chattanooga	Austin Peay (1–0)	Richmond (2–0)	Missouri State (3–0)	Weber State (1–3)	Weber State (2–3)	Weber State (2–3)	Missouri State (4–2)	VMI (5–2)	VMI (6–2)	Sacramento State (7–2)	Sacramento State (8–2)	Princeton (9–1)	Stephen F. Austin (8–4)	18.
19.	VMI	East Tennessee State (1–0)	Missouri State (1–1)	Monmouth (2–1)	Chattanooga (1–2)	Chattanooga (2–2)	Harvard (4–0)	Rhode Island (5–1)	Eastern Kentucky (5–2)	Eastern Kentucky (6–2)	Chattanooga (6–3)	Incarnate Word (8–2)	Stephen F. Austin (8–3)	Jackson State (11–2)	19.
20.	Kennesaw State	VMI (1–0)	Monmouth (1–1)	Austin Peay (2–1)	Kennesaw State (2–1)	Rhode Island (4–0)	Princeton (4–0)	Jackson State (5–1)	Missouri State (4–3)	Missouri State (5–3)	VMI (6–3)	Princeton (8–1)	Dartmouth (9–1) т	South Dakota (7–5)	20.
21.	UC Davis	Monmouth (0–1)	Austin Peay (1–1)	Richmond (2–1)	Richmond (2–2)	UT Martin (3–1)	South Dakota (4–2)	Jacksonville State (3–3)	Harvard (5–1)	South Dakota (5–3)	Incarnate Word (7–2)	Dartmouth (8–1)	South Dakota (7–4) т	Princeton (9–1)	21.
22.	Richmond	Richmond (1–0)	Chattanooga (1–1)	New Hampshire (3–0)	VMI (3–1)	Harvard (3–0) т	Jacksonville State (3–3)	Eastern Kentucky (5–2)	South Dakota (5–3)	Sacramento State (6–2)	Princeton (7–1)	Stephen F. Austin (7–3)	Florida A&M (9–2)	Holy Cross (10–3)	22.
23.	Nicholls	Kennesaw State (1–0)	New Hampshire (2–0)	Chattanooga (1–2)	Rhode Island (3–0)	Jacksonville State (2–3) т	Missouri State (3–2)	VMI (5–2)	Sacramento State (5–2) т	William & Mary (6–2)	Dartmouth (7–1)	Mercer (7–2)	Southern Illinois (7–4)	Dartmouth (9–1)	23.
24.	North Carolina A&T	Chattanooga (0–1)	Central Arkansas (0–2)	Central Arkansas (1–2) т	Holy Cross (3–1) т	Princeton (3–0)	North Dakota (2–3)	Northern Iowa (3–3)	Weber State (3–4) т	Weber State (4–4)	Northern Iowa (5–4)	Monmouth (7–3)	Holy Cross (9–2)	Florida A&M (9–3)	24.
25.	Austin Peay	Missouri State (0–1)	Furman (2–0)	Kennesaw State (2–1) т	UT Martin (3–1) т	Monmouth (3–2)	Jackson State (4–1)	Delaware (3–3)	Rhode Island (5–2)	Chattanooga (5–3)	Eastern Kentucky (6–3)	Florida A&M (8–2)	Northern Iowa (6–5)	Northern Iowa (6–6)	25.
	Preseason August 16	Week 1 September 7	Week 2 September 13	Week 3 September 20	Week 4 September 27	Week 5 October 4	Week 6 October 11	Week 7 October 18	Week 8 October 25, 2021	Week 9 November 1	Week 10 November 8	Week 11 November 15	Week 12 November 22	Final January 10, 2022	
		Dropped: No. 23 Nicholls; No. 24 North Carolina A&T	Dropped: No. 20 VMI; No. 23 Kennesaw State	Dropped: No. 25 Furman	Dropped: No. 19 Monmouth; No. 20 Austin Peay; No. 22 New Hampshire; No. 24т Central Arkansas	Dropped: No. 21 Richmond; No. 22 VMI; No. 24т Holy Cross	Dropped: No. 19 Chattanooga; No. 25 Monmouth	Dropped: No. 18 Weber State; No. 24 North Dakota	Dropped: No. 21 Jacksonville State; No. 25 Delaware	Dropped: No. 21 Harvard; No. 25 Rhode Island	Dropped: No. 23 William & Mary; No. 24 Weber State	Dropped: No. 19 Chattanooga; No 20. VMI; No. 24 Northern Iowa; No. 25 Eastern Kentucky	Dropped: No. 23 Mercer; No. 24 Monmouth	None	
