= 2021 Kennesaw State Owls football team =

American college football season

2021 Kennesaw State Owls football

Big South champion

FCS Playoffs, L 31–32 vs. East Tennessee State
- Conference: Big South Conference

Ranking
- STATS: No. 11
- FCS Coaches: No. 10
- Record: 11–2 (7–0 Big South)
- Head coach: Brian Bohannon (7th season)
- Offensive coordinator: Grant Chesnut (7th season)
- Offensive scheme: Flexbone option
- Defensive coordinator: Danny Verpaele (2nd season)
- Base defense: 4–2–5
- Home stadium: Fifth Third Bank Stadium

2021 Big South Conference football standings
	Conf.			Overall
Team	W		L	W		L
No. 11 Kennesaw State $^	7	–	0	11	–	2
Monmouth	6	–	1	7	–	4
North Carolina A&T	3	–	4	5	–	6
North Alabama	3	–	4	3	–	8
Charleston Southern	3	–	4	4	–	6
Hampton	3	–	4	5	–	6
Robert Morris	3	–	5	4	–	6
Campbell	2	–	5	3	–	8
Gardner–Webb	2	–	5	4	–	7
$ – Conference champion; ^ – FCS playoff participant; Rankings from STATS Poll

The 2021 Kennesaw State Owls football team represented the Kennesaw State University as a member of the Big South Conference during the 2021 NCAA Division I FCS football season. Led by seventh-year head coach Brian Bohannon, the Owls played their home games at the Fifth Third Bank Stadium in Kennesaw, Georgia.

== Schedule ==
Kennesaw State announced its 2021 football schedule on April 21, 2021. The 2021 schedule consisted of 5 home and 6 away games in the regular season.

Date	Time	Opponent	Rank	Site	TV	Result	Attendance
September 2	8:00 p.m.	Reinhardt*	No. 19	Fifth Third Bank Stadium; Kennesaw, GA	ESPN+	W 35–25	6,348
September 11	12:00 p.m.	at Georgia Tech*	No. 22	Bobby Dodd Stadium; Atlanta, GA	ACCRSN	L 17–45	35,195
September 18	6:00 p.m.	at Wofford*	No. 24	Gibbs Stadium; Spartanburg, SC	ESPN+	W 31–10	4,597
October 2	3:00 p.m.	No. 17 Jacksonville State*	No. 20	Fifth Third Bank Stadium; Kennesaw, GA	ESPN+	W 31–6	7,476
October 9	2:00 p.m.	Hampton	No. 17	Armstrong Stadium; Hampton, VA	ESPN3	W 34–15	3,983
October 16	5:00 p.m.	North Carolina A&T	No. 15	Fifth Third Bank Stadium; Kennesaw, GA	ESPN+	W 14–0	9,556
October 23	4:00 p.m.	at Campbell	No. 12	Barker–Lane Stadium; Buies Creek, NC	ESPN+	W 30–7	5,977
October 30	1:00 p.m.	Gardner–Webb	No. 12	Fifth Third Bank Stadium; Kennesaw, GA	ESPN+	W 34–30	4,041
November 6	12:00 p.m.	at Robert Morris	No. 12	Joe Walton Stadium; Moon Township, PA	ESPN+	W 45–21	2,144
November 13	3:00 p.m.	at North Alabama	No. 10	Braly Municipal Stadium; Florence, AL	ESPN+	W 28–24	7,023
November 20	1:00 p.m.	Monmouth	No. 9	Fifth Third Bank Stadium; Kennesaw, GA	ESPN+	W 49–17	4,630
November 27	2:00 p.m.	Davidson*	No. 10	Fifth Third Bank Stadium; Kennesaw, GA (FCS Playoffs – First Round)	ESPN+	W 48–21	2,764
December 4	2:00 p.m.	at No. 9 East Tennessee State*	No. 10	William B. Greene Jr. Stadium; Johnson City, TN (FCS Playoffs – Second Round)	ESPN+	L 31–32	8,453
*Non-conference game; Rankings from STATS Poll released prior to the game; All times are in Eastern time

== Game summaries ==
=== At Georgia Tech ===
Kennesaw State (1–0) vs. Georgia Tech Yellow Jackets (0–1)

Quarter	1	2	3	4	Total
Kennesaw State	0	3	0	14	17
Georgia Tech	14	10	7	14	45

at Bobby Dodd Stadium • Atlanta, GA

- Date: Saturday, September 11, 2021
- Game time: 12:00 p.m. EDT
- Game weather: Sunny • Temperature: 79°F
- Game attendance: 35,195
- Referee: Jeff Flanagan
- TV announcers (ESPN3): Brad Rathbun, Brian Jordan, Lyndsay Rowley

Game information

First Quarter

Second Quarter

Third Quarter

Fourth Quarter

Statistics	KSU	GT
First downs	13	20
Total yards	260	412
Rushes/yards	43/149	36/158
Passing yards	111	254
Passing: Comp–Att–Int	8–20–2	17–23–0
Time of possession	33:41	26:16

Team	Category	Player	Statistics
Kennesaw State	Passing	Xavier Shepherd	8/20, 110 yards, 1 TD, 1 INT
Kennesaw State	Rushing	Iaan Cousin	3 carries, 52 yards, 1 TD
Kennesaw State	Receiving	Adeolu Adeleke	1 reception, 39 yards, 1 TD
Georgia Tech	Passing	Jordan Yates	17/23, 254 yards, 4 TD
Georgia Tech	Rushing	Dontae Smith	8 carries, 82 yards, 1 TD
Georgia Tech	Receiving	Kyric McGowan	6 receptions, 91 yards, 2 TD

=== At No. 9 East Tennessee State (FCS Second Round) ===
No. 10 Kennesaw State Owls at No. 9 East Tennessee State Buccaneers (FCS Second Round) – Game summary

Quarter	1	2	3	4	Total
No. 10 Owls	0	7	14	10	31
No. 9 Buccaneers	0	10	7	15	32

at William B. Greene Jr. Stadium, Johnson City, Tennessee

- Date: December 4
- Game time: 2:00 p.m. EST
- Game weather: Mostly cloudy, 63 °F (17 °C)
- Game attendance: 8,453
- Referee: Marcus Thornton
- TV: ESPN+
- Box score, Recap

Game information
First quarter
- No scoring plays

Second quarter

- ETSU – Quay Holmes 34-yard pass from Tyler Riddell (Tyler Keltner kick), 7:25. Buccaneers 7–0. Drive: 4 plays, 53 yards, 2:08.
- KSU – Iaan Cousin 50-yard pass from Jonathan Murphy (Nathan Robertson kick), 6:17. Tied 7–7. Drive: 3 plays, 76 yards, 1:03.
- ETSU – Tyler Keltner 47-yard field goal, 3:27. Buccaneers 10–7. Drive: 5 plays, 32 yards, 2:43.

Third quarter

- ETSU – Quay Holmes 31-yard run (Nathan Robertson kick), 11:45. Buccaneers 17–7. Drive: 8 plays, 74 yards, 3:15.
- KSU – Kyle Glover 22-yard pass from Jonathan Murphy (Nathan Robertson kick), 8:19. Buccaneers 17–14. Drive: 7 plays, 88 yards, 3:21.
- KSU – Jonathan Murphy 1-yard run (Nathan Robertson kick), 1:05. Owls 21–17. Drive: 13 plays, 55 yards, 5:38.

Fourth quarter

- KSU – Jonathan Murphy 9-yard run (Nathan Robertson kick), 12:21. Owls 28–17. Drive: 6 plays, 53 yards, 2:25.
- KSU – Nathan Robertson 45-yard field goal, 5:02. Owls 31–17. Drive: 14 plays, 49 yards, 6:48.
- ETSU – Will Huzzie 12-yard pass from Tyler Riddell (Tyler Keltner kick), 1:28. Owls 31–24. Drive: 13 plays, 78 yards, 3:31.
- ETSU – Quay Holmes 4-yard pass from Tyler Riddell (Tyler Riddell pass to Nate Adkins), 0:35. Buccaneers 32–31. Drive: 5 plays, 48 yards, 0:51.

Statistics	KSU	ETSU
First downs	23	19
Total yards	457	308
Rushing yards	287	70
Passing yards	170	238
Turnovers	1	1
Time of possession	35:00	25:00

Team	Category	Player	Statistics
Kennesaw State	Passing	Jonathan Murphy	6/14, 125 yards, 2 TD
Kennesaw State	Rushing	Jonathan Murphy	28 rushes, 164 yards, 2 TD
Kennesaw State	Receiving	Iaan Cousin	3 receptions, 81 yards, TD
East Tennessee State	Passing	Tyler Riddell	22/35, 238 yards, 3 TD, INT
East Tennessee State	Rushing	Quay Holmes	13 rushes, 87 yards, TD
East Tennessee State	Receiving	Quay Holmes	7 receptions, 95 yards, 2 TD
