= 2021 Campbell Fighting Camels football team =

American college football season

2021 Campbell Fighting Camels football
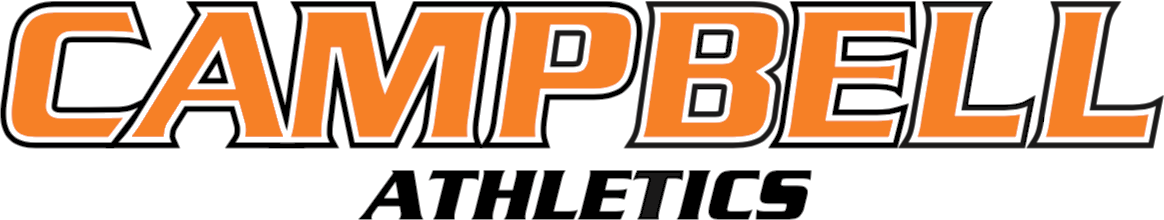
- Conference: Big South Conference
- Record: 3–8 (2–5 Big South)
- Head coach: Mike Minter (9th season)
- Offensive coordinator: Nick Grimes (3rd season)
- Defensive coordinator: Weston Glaser (3rd season)
- Home stadium: Barker–Lane Stadium

2021 Big South Conference football standings
	Conf.			Overall
Team	W		L	W		L
No. 11 Kennesaw State $^	7	–	0	11	–	2
Monmouth	6	–	1	7	–	4
North Carolina A&T	3	–	4	5	–	6
North Alabama	3	–	4	3	–	8
Charleston Southern	3	–	4	4	–	6
Hampton	3	–	4	5	–	6
Robert Morris	3	–	5	4	–	6
Campbell	2	–	5	3	–	8
Gardner–Webb	2	–	5	4	–	7
$ – Conference champion; ^ – FCS playoff participant; Rankings from STATS Poll

The 2021 Campbell Fighting Camels football team represented the Campbell University as a member of the Big South Conference during the 2021 NCAA Division I FCS football season. Led by ninth-year head coach Mike Minter, the Fighting Camels played their home games at the Barker–Lane Stadium in Buies Creek, North Carolina.

== Schedule ==
Date	Time	Opponent	Site	TV	Result	Attendance
September 4	6:00 p.m.	at Liberty*	Williams Stadium; Lynchburg, VA	ESPN3	L 7–48	15,834
September 11	6:00 p.m.	Elon*	Barker–Lane Stadium; Buies Creek, NC	ESPN+	L 23–24	5,032
September 18	6:00 p.m.	Presbyterian*	Barker–Lane Stadium; Buies Creek, NC	ESPN+	W 72–0	4,978
October 2	7:00 p.m.	at North Alabama	Braly Municipal Stadium; Florence, AL	ESPN+	W 48–31	6,533
October 9	6:00 p.m.	at Gardner–Webb	Ernest W. Spangler Stadium; Boiling Springs, NC	ESPN+	W 42–28	4,150
October 16	1:00 p.m.	Monmouth	Barker–Lane Stadium; Buies Creek, NC	ESPN3	L 17–34	5,108
October 23	4:00 p.m.	No. 12 Kennesaw State	Barker–Lane Stadium; Buies Creek, NC	ESPN+	L 7–30	5,977
October 30	1:00 p.m.	at Charleston Southern	Buccaneer Field; North Charleston, SC	ESPN+/Nexstar	L 14–27	3,208
November 6	3:30 p.m.	at No. 3 James Madison*	Bridgeforth Stadium; Harrisonburg, VA	NBCSW+/FloSports	L 14–51	23,571
November 13	1:00 p.m.	Hampton	Barker–Lane Stadium; Buies Creek, NC	ESPN+/Nexstar	L 21–28	4,726
November 20	12:00 p.m.	at Robert Morris	Joe Walton Stadium; Moon Township, PA	ESPN+	L 17–20 ^{OT}	1,616
*Non-conference game; Rankings from STATS Poll released prior to the game; All times are in Eastern time

== Game summaries ==
=== at Liberty ===
Campbell Fighting Camels at Liberty Flames – Game summary

Quarter	1	2	3	4	Total
Fighting Camels	0	7	0	0	7
Flames	14	6	14	14	48

at Williams Stadium, Lynchburg, Virginia

- Date: September 4
- Game time: 6:00 p.m. EDT
- Game weather: Temperature: 81 °F (27 °C) • Weather: Sunny • Wind: S 7 MPH
- Game attendance: 15,834
- Referee: Timot Hedgepeth
- TV announcers (ESPN3): Matt Warner, Joe Jauch and Emily Austen

Game information

First quarter

- LIB – Demario Douglas 35-yard pass from Malik Willis (Alex Barbir kick), 11:18. Flames 7–0. Drive: 3 plays, 55 yards, 0:46.
- LIB – C. J. Daniels 0-yard fumble return (Alex Barbir kick), 4:57. Flames 14–0.

Second quarter

- CAM – Caleb Snead 40-yard pass from Hajj-Malik Williams (Isaac Riffle kick), 10:41. Flames 14–7. Drive: 2 plays, 50 yards, 0:39.
- LIB – Malik Willis 12-yard run (kick failed), 0:25. Flames 20–7. Drive: 9 plays, 80 yards, 3:01.

Third quarter

- LIB – Joshua Mack 1-yard run (Alex Barbir kick), 12:53. Flames 27–7. Drive: 4 plays, 28 yards, 2:03.
- LIB – Shedro Louis 36-yard run (Alex Barbir kick), 4:53. Flames 34–7. Drive: 9 plays, 85 yards, 4:20.

Fourth quarter

- LIB – Jaivan Lofton 27-yard pass from Johnathan Bennett (Alex Barbir kick), 10:46. Flames 41–7. Drive: 8 plays, 65 yards, 3:19.
- LIB – Johnathan Bennett 2-yard run (Alex Barbir kick), 1:18. Flames 48–7. Drive: 10 plays, 59 yards, 7:15.

Top passers

- CAM – Hajj-Malik Williams – 15/32, 183 yards, TD
- LIB – Malik Willis – 15/23, 217 yards, TD

Top rushers

- CAM – Hajj-Malik Williams – 4 rushes, 26 yards
- LIB – Joshua Mack – 19 rushes, 60 yards, TD

Top receivers

- CAM – Caleb Snead – 4 receptions, 70 yards, TD
- LIB – Demario Douglas – 7 receptions, 84 yards, TD
