= 2021 East Tennessee State Buccaneers football team =

American college football season

2021 East Tennessee State Buccaneers football

SoCon champion

NCAA Division I Quarterfinal, L 3–27 vs. North Dakota State
- Conference: Southern Conference

Ranking
- STATS: No. 9
- FCS Coaches: No. 7
- Record: 11–2 (7–1 SoCon)
- Head coach: Randy Sanders (4th season)
- Offensive coordinator: Mike Rader (4th season)
- Defensive coordinator: Billy Taylor (7th season)
- Home stadium: William B. Greene Jr. Stadium

2021 Southern Conference football standings
	Conf.			Overall
Team	W		L	W		L
No. 9 East Tennessee State $^	7	–	1	11	–	2
Mercer	6	–	2	7	–	3
Chattanooga	5	–	3	6	–	5
Western Carolina	4	–	4	4	–	7
Furman	4	–	4	6	–	5
VMI	4	–	4	6	–	5
Samford	3	–	5	4	–	7
The Citadel	3	–	5	4	–	7
Wofford	0	–	8	1	–	10
$ – Conference champion; ^ – FCS playoff participant; Rankings from STATS Poll

The 2021 East Tennessee State Buccaneers football team represented East Tennessee State University in the 2021 NCAA Division I FCS football season as a member of the Southern Conference (SoCon). The Buccaneers were led by fourth-year head coach Randy Sanders and played their home games at William B. Greene Jr. Stadium in Johnson City, Tennessee. On November 20, 2021, the Buccaneers defeated SoCon rival Mercer, clinching the Southern Conference championship. The Buccaneers also finished their regular season with an overall record of 10–1, making only the third time in program history to have won 10 games. They also beat FBS Vanderbilt in a 23-3 blowout win.

== Schedule ==
Date	Time	Opponent	Rank	Site	TV	Result	Attendance
September 4	8:00 p.m.	at Vanderbilt*		Vanderbilt Stadium; Nashville, TN	ESPN+, SECN+	W 23–3	22,029
September 11	7:30 p.m.	Virginia–Wise*	No. 15	William B. Greene Jr. Stadium; Johnson City, TN	ESPN3	W 45–14	9,720
September 18	7:30 p.m.	Delaware State*	No. 16	William B. Greene Jr. Stadium; Johnson City, TN	ESPN+	W 38–6	8,015
September 25	3:00 p.m.	at Samford	No. 15	Seibert Stadium; Homewood, AL	ESPN+	W 55–48 ^{OT}	6,753
October 2	3:30 p.m.	Wofford	No. 13	William B. Greene Jr. Stadium; Johnson City, TN	ESPN+	W 27–21	10,153
October 9	4:30 p.m.	The Citadel	No. 12	William B. Greene Jr. Stadium; Johnson City, TN	ESPN+	W 48–21	9,202
October 16	1:30 p.m.	at Chattanooga	No. 10	Finley Stadium; Chattanooga, TN	ESPN+	L 16–21	7,838
October 23	2:00 p.m.	at Furman	No. 14	Paladin Stadium; Greenville, SC	ESPN+	W 17–13	9,330
November 6	1:00 p.m.	No. 18 VMI	No. 14	William B. Greene Jr. Stadium; Johnson City, TN	ESPN+	W 27–20	10,416
November 13	2:00 p.m.	at Western Carolina	No. 11	Bob Waters Field at E. J. Whitmire Stadium; Cullowhee, NC	ESPN+	W 56–35	10,348
November 20	1:00 p.m.	No. 21 Mercer	No. 8	William B. Greene Jr. Stadium; Johnson City, TN	ESPN3	W 38–35	10,594
December 4	1:00 p.m.	No. 10 Kennesaw State*	No. 9	William B. Greene Jr. Stadium; Johnson City, TN (NCAA Division I Second Round)	ESPN+	W 32–31	8,453
December 11	12:00 p.m.	at No. 3 North Dakota State*	No. 9	Fargodome; Fargo, ND (NCAA Division I Quarterfinal)	ESPN	L 3–27	11,794
*Non-conference game; Rankings from STATS Poll released prior to the game; All times are in Eastern time

== Game summaries ==
=== at Vanderbilt ===
	1	2	3	4	Total
Buccaneers	0	10	3	10	23
Commodores	3	0	0	0	3

Statistics

Statistics	ETSU	VAN
First downs	13	23
Total yards	314	321
Rushing yards	179	85
Passing yards	135	236
Turnovers	0	3
Time of possession	32:47	27:13

Team	Category	Player	Statistics
East Tennessee State	Passing	Tyler Riddell	13/22, 135 yards, TD
East Tennessee State	Rushing	Quay Holmes	23 rushes, 149 yards
East Tennessee State	Receiving	Will Huzzie	4 receptions, 62 yards
Vanderbilt	Passing	Ken Seals	20/35, 195 yards, 2 INT
Vanderbilt	Rushing	Re'Mahn Davis	15 rushes, 58 yards
Vanderbilt	Receiving	Will Sheppard	9 receptions, 84 yards
