= 2021 Hampton Pirates football team =

American college football season

2021 Hampton Pirates football
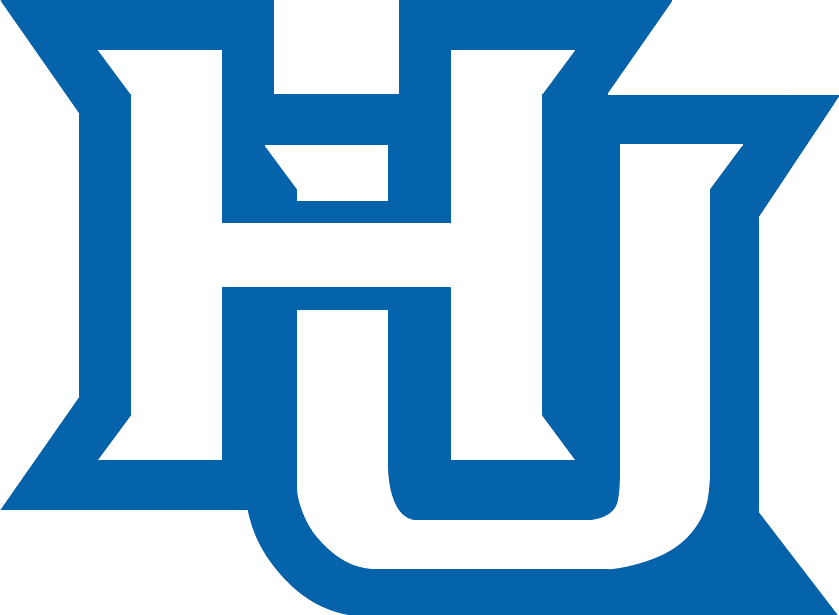
- Conference: Big South Conference
- Record: 5–6 (3–4 Big South)
- Head coach: Robert Prunty (3rd season)
- Offensive coordinator: Zack Patterson (2nd season)
- Defensive coordinator: Todd McComb (2nd season)
- Home stadium: Armstrong Stadium

2021 Big South Conference football standings
	Conf.			Overall
Team	W		L	W		L
No. 11 Kennesaw State $^	7	–	0	11	–	2
Monmouth	6	–	1	7	–	4
North Carolina A&T	3	–	4	5	–	6
North Alabama	3	–	4	3	–	8
Charleston Southern	3	–	4	4	–	6
Hampton	3	–	4	5	–	6
Robert Morris	3	–	5	4	–	6
Campbell	2	–	5	3	–	8
Gardner–Webb	2	–	5	4	–	7
$ – Conference champion; ^ – FCS playoff participant; Rankings from STATS Poll

The 2021 Hampton Pirates football team represented the Hampton University as a member of the Big South Conference during the 2021 NCAA Division I FCS football season. Led by third-year head coach Robert Prunty, the Pirates played their home games at the Armstrong Stadium in Hampton, Virginia.

This was Hampton's final season as a member of the Big South Conference. The Pirates joined the Colonial Athletic Association (CAA) for all sports starting in 2022–23.

== Preseason ==
=== Big South poll ===
The Big South media days were held on July 27, 2021. In the conference preseason poll the Pirates were predicted to finish in seventh place.

Predicted finish	Team	Votes (1st place)
1	Monmouth	141 (16)
2	Kennesaw State	117 (1)
3	North Carolina A&T	100
4	Charleston Southern	85 (1)
5	Campbell	82
6	Gardner-Webb	59
7	Hampton	35
8	Robert Morris	29
—	North Alabama	n/a

== Schedule ==
Date	Time	Opponent	Site	TV	Result	Attendance
September 4	6:00 p.m.	Virginia Union*	Armstrong Stadium; Hampton, VA	ESPN+	W 42–28	4,500
September 11	7:00 p.m.	at Old Dominion*	S.B. Ballard Stadium; Norfolk, VA	ESPN3	L 7–47	18,363
September 18	12:00 p.m.	at Howard*	Audi Field; Washington, D.C. (The Real HU)	NBCSN	W 48–32	14,752
October 2	2:00 p.m.	Norfolk State*	Armstrong Stadium; Hampton, VA (Battle of the Bay)	ESPN+	L 44–47 ^{OT}	4,013
October 9	2:00 p.m.	No. 17 Kennesaw State^{†}	Armstrong Stadium; Hampton, VA	ESPN3	L 15–34	3,983
October 16	6:00 p.m.	at Charleston Southern	Buccaneer Field; North Charleston, SC	ESPN+	L 5–35	3,928
October 23	2:00 p.m.	North Carolina A&T	Armstrong Stadium; Hampton, VA	ESPN+	W 30–9	3,991
October 30	12:00 p.m.	at Robert Morris	Joe Walton Stadium; Moon Township, PA	ESPN3	L 35–38	1,633
November 6	1:00 p.m.	Gardner–Webb	Armstrong Stadium; Hampton, VA	ESPN+/Nexstar	W 27–21 ^{OT}	2,802
November 13	1:00 p.m.	at Campbell	Barker–Lane Stadium; Buies Creek, NC	ESPN+/Nexstar	W 28–21	4,726
November 20	1:00 p.m.	North Alabama	Armstrong Stadium; Hampton, VA	ESPN+	L 27–35	1,500
*Non-conference game; ^{†}Homecoming; Rankings from STATS Poll released prior to the game; All times are in Eastern time

== Game summaries ==
=== Virginia Union ===
	1	2	3	4	Total
Panthers	0	14	7	7	28
Pirates	13	0	8	21	42

Statistics	VIR	HAMP
First downs	16	32
Total yards	395	611
Rushing yards	85	369
Passing yards	310	242
Turnovers	3	2
Time of possession	25:49	34:11

Team	Category	Player	Statistics
Virginia Union	Passing	Khalid Morris	15/28, 271 yards, 2 TD, 2 INT
Virginia Union	Rushing	Demetrius Mann	3 rushes, 25 yards
Virginia Union	Receiving	Charles Hall	6 receptions, 182 yards, TD
Hampton	Passing	Jett Duffey	24/35, 242 yards, 2 TD, 2 INT
Hampton	Rushing	Darran Butts	11 rushes, 143 yards, TD
Hampton	Receiving	Romon Copeland	4 receptions, 73 yards

=== At Old Dominion ===
	1	2	3	4	Total
Pirates	0	0	7	0	7
Monarchs	10	24	7	6	47

Statistics	HAMP	ODU
First downs	13	32
Total yards	187	572
Rushing yards	104	358
Passing yards	83	214
Turnovers	0	0
Time of possession	26:55	33:05

Team	Category	Player	Statistics
Hampton	Passing	Jett Duffey	7/16, 83 yards, TD
Hampton	Rushing	Elijah Burris	12 rushes, 45 yards
Hampton	Receiving	Jadakis Bonds	5 receptions, 68 yards, TD
Old Dominion	Passing	D. J. Mack Jr.	11/22, 162 yards, TD
Old Dominion	Rushing	Jon-Luke Peaker	18 rushes, 141 yards
Old Dominion	Receiving	Zack Kuntz	3 receptions, 61 yards

=== At Howard ===
	1	2	3	4	Total
Pirates	7	14	21	6	48
Bison	7	10	0	15	32

Statistics	HAMP	HOW
First downs	21	21
Total yards	557	430
Rushing yards	257	73
Passing yards	300	357
Turnovers	0	4
Time of possession	32:30	27:30

Team	Category	Player	Statistics
Hampton	Passing	Jett Duffey	14/22, 300 yards, 2 TD
Hampton	Rushing	Darran Butts	9 rushes, 87 yards, TD
Hampton	Receiving	Hezekiah Grimsley	3 receptions, 165 yards, TD
Howard	Passing	Quinton Williams	22/37, 357 yards, 2 TD, 2 INT
Howard	Rushing	Jarrett Hunter	14 rushes, 48 yards, TD
Howard	Receiving	Antoine Murray	4 receptions, 106 yards, TD

=== Norfolk State ===
	1	2	3	4	OT	Total
Spartans	0	17	14	10	6	47
Pirates	10	17	0	14	3	44

Statistics	NORF	HAMP
First downs	20	27
Total yards	496	509
Rushing yards	202	139
Passing yards	294	370
Turnovers	1	4
Time of possession	30:14	29:46

Team	Category	Player	Statistics
Norfolk State	Passing	Juwan Carter	17/31, 294 yards, 2 TD
Norfolk State	Rushing	Juwan Carter	17 rushes, 92 yards, 3 TD
Norfolk State	Receiving	Justin Smith	5 receptions, 144 yards, TD
Hampton	Passing	Jett Duffey	22/44, 370 yards, 4 TD, 3 INT
Hampton	Rushing	Elijah Burris	13 rushes, 65 yards, TD
Hampton	Receiving	Jadakis Bonds	6 receptions, 155 yards, 2 TD

=== No. 17 Kennesaw State ===
	1	2	3	4	Total
No. 17 Owls	3	17	7	7	34
Pirates	0	6	3	6	15

Statistics	KENN	HAMP
First downs	20	15
Total yards	448	276
Rushing yards	339	125
Passing yards	109	151
Turnovers	3	1
Time of possession	32:49	27:11

Team	Category	Player	Statistics
Kennesaw State	Passing	Xavier Sheppard	8/11, 109 yards
Kennesaw State	Rushing	Xavier Sheppard	29 rushes, 179 yards, 3 TD
Kennesaw State	Receiving	Iaan Cousin	1 reception, 37 yards
Hampton	Passing	Jett Duffey	11/16, 128 yards, TD
Hampton	Rushing	Keyondre White	7 rushes, 47 yards
Hampton	Receiving	Jadakis Bonds	5 receptions, 68 yards

=== At Charleston Southern ===
	1	2	3	4	Total
Pirates	0	3	0	2	5
Buccaneers	7	7	21	0	35

Statistics	HAMP	CHSO
First downs	22	21
Total yards	327	429
Rushing yards	179	72
Passing yards	148	357
Turnovers	1	0
Time of possession	37:06	22:54

Team	Category	Player	Statistics
Hampton	Passing	Jett Duffey	19/42, 148 yards, INT
Hampton	Rushing	Tymere Robinson	17 rushes, 57 yards
Hampton	Receiving	Jadakis Bonds	11 receptions, 111 yards
Charleston Southern	Passing	Jack Chambers	25/43, 357 yards, 4 TD
Charleston Southern	Rushing	Roderick Hawkins	12 rushes, 50 yards, 2 TD
Charleston Southern	Receiving	Cayden Jordan	6 receptions, 152 yards

=== North Carolina A&T ===
	1	2	3	4	Total
Aggies	9	0	0	0	9
Pirates	7	6	7	10	30

Statistics	NCAT	HAMP
First downs	21	19
Total yards	364	441
Rushing yards	91	156
Passing yards	273	285
Turnovers	3	0
Time of possession	28:03	31:57

Team	Category	Player	Statistics
North Carolina A&T	Passing	Jalen Fowler	17/25, 234 yards, TD, 2 INT
North Carolina A&T	Rushing	Jah-Maine Martin	11 rushes, 27 yards
North Carolina A&T	Receiving	Jamison Warren	5 receptions, 103 yards, TD
Hampton	Passing	Jett Duffey	17/28, 285 yards, 2 TD
Hampton	Rushing	Elijah Burris	16 rushes, 86 yards, TD
Hampton	Receiving	Romon Copeland	3 receptions, 112 yards, TD

=== At Robert Morris ===
	1	2	3	4	Total
Pirates	7	14	7	7	35
Colonials	7	6	7	18	38

Statistics	HAMP	RMU
First downs	22	27
Total yards	481	500
Rushing yards	194	139
Passing yards	287	361
Turnovers	1	0
Time of possession	26:38	33:22

Team	Category	Player	Statistics
Hampton	Passing	Jett Duffey	14/20, 287 yards
Hampton	Rushing	Jett Duffey	18 rushes, 84 yards, 5 TD
Hampton	Receiving	Trent Cloud	3 receptions, 109 yards
Robert Morris	Passing	George Martin	28/39, 315 yards, 2 TD
Robert Morris	Rushing	Alijah Jackson	25 rushes, 127 yards, TD
Robert Morris	Receiving	James Westry	6 receptions, 101 yards

=== Gardner–Webb ===
	1	2	3	4	OT	Total
Runnin' Bulldogs	14	0	7	0	0	21
Pirates	7	14	0	0	6	27

Statistics	GWEB	HAMP
First downs	17	16
Total yards	298	413
Rushing yards	137	182
Passing yards	161	231
Turnovers	0	2
Time of possession	29:42	30:18

Team	Category	Player	Statistics
Gardner–Webb	Passing	Bailey Fisher	20/35, 161 yards, 2 TD
Gardner–Webb	Rushing	Narii Gaither	27 rushes, 147 yards
Gardner–Webb	Receiving	Narii Gaither	6 receptions, 57 yards, TD
Hampton	Passing	Jett Duffey	12/18, 231 yards, 3 TD, 2 INT
Hampton	Rushing	Elijah Burris	14 rushes, 64 yards
Hampton	Receiving	Romon Copeland	2 receptions, 101 yards, TD

=== At Campbell ===
	1	2	3	4	Total
Pirates	7	0	10	11	28
Fighting Camels	7	7	0	7	21

Statistics	HAMP	CAM
First downs	23	19
Total yards	353	327
Rushing yards	122	131
Passing yards	231	196
Turnovers	2	2
Time of possession	31:51	28:09

Team	Category	Player	Statistics
Hampton	Passing	Jett Duffey	19/31, 231 yards, 2 INT
Hampton	Rushing	Jett Duffey	17 rushes, 51 yards, 2 TD
Hampton	Receiving	Jadakis Bonds	8 receptions, 110 yards
Campbell	Passing	Dylan Earney	16/29, 196 yards, TD
Campbell	Rushing	Michael Jamerson	15 rushes, 67 yards
Campbell	Receiving	Jalen Kelsey	4 receptions, 97 yards, TD

=== North Alabama ===
	1	2	3	4	Total
Lions	14	14	0	7	35
Pirates	7	7	0	13	27

Statistics	UNA	HAMP
First downs	23	16
Total yards	464	363
Rushing yards	113	121
Passing yards	351	242
Turnovers	2	2
Time of possession	34:31	25:29

Team	Category	Player	Statistics
North Alabama	Passing	Blake Dever	15/18, 254 yards, TD
North Alabama	Rushing	Parker Driggers	14 rushes, 60 yards, 2 TD
North Alabama	Receiving	Cortez Hall	4 receptions, 71 yards
Hampton	Passing	Jett Duffey	15/24, 242 yards, 2 INT
Hampton	Rushing	Jett Duffey	16 rushes, 69 yards, 2 TD
Hampton	Receiving	Romon Copeland	6 receptions, 129 yards
