= 2021 Furman Paladins football team =

American college football season

2021 Furman Paladins football
- Conference: Southern Conference
- Record: 6–5 (4–4 SoCon)
- Head coach: Clay Hendrix (5th season)
- Offensive coordinator: George Quarles (4th season)
- Defensive coordinator: Duane Vaughn (3rd season)
- Captains: Hamp Sisson; Devin Wynn; Elijah McKoy; DiMarcus Clay
- Home stadium: Paladin Stadium

2021 Southern Conference football standings
	Conf.			Overall
Team	W		L	W		L
No. 9 East Tennessee State $^	7	–	1	11	–	2
Mercer	6	–	2	7	–	3
Chattanooga	5	–	3	6	–	5
Western Carolina	4	–	4	4	–	7
Furman	4	–	4	6	–	5
VMI	4	–	4	6	–	5
Samford	3	–	5	4	–	7
The Citadel	3	–	5	4	–	7
Wofford	0	–	8	1	–	10
$ – Conference champion; ^ – FCS playoff participant; Rankings from STATS Poll

The 2021 Furman Paladins team represented Furman University as a member of the Southern Conference (SoCon) during the 2021 NCAA Division I FCS football season. Led by fifth-year head coach Clay Hendrix, the Paladins compiled an overall record of 6–5 with a mark of 4–4 in conference play, placing in a three-way tie for fourth in the SoCon. Furman played home games at Paladin Stadium in Greenville, South Carolina.

== Schedule ==
Date	Time	Opponent	Site	TV	Result	Attendance
September 4	2:00 p.m.	No. 25 North Carolina A&T*	Paladin Stadium; Greenville, SC	Nexstar/ESPN+	W 29–18	11,628
September 11	2:30 p.m.	at Tennessee Tech*	Tucker Stadium; Cookeville, TN	ESPN+	W 26–0	8,911
September 18	7:30 p.m.	at NC State*	Carter–Finley Stadium; Raleigh, NC	ACCRSN	L 7–45	56,919
September 25	2:00 p.m.	Mercer	Paladin Stadium; Greenville, SC	ESPN+	L 3–24	10,203
October 9	1:30 p.m.	at Wofford	Gibbs Stadium; Spartanburg, SC (rivalry)	ESPN+	W 42–20	6,065
October 16	6:00 p.m.	The Citadel	Paladin Stadium; Greenville, SC (rivalry)	ESPN3	W 24–14	10,164
October 23	2:00 p.m.	No. 14 East Tennessee State	Paladin Stadium; Greenville, SC	ESN+	L 13–17	9,330
October 30	1:30 p.m.	at Chattanooga	Finley Stadium; Chattanooga, TN	ESPN+	L 3–13	6,448
November 6	2:00 p.m.	at Western Carolina	Bob Waters Field at E. J. Whitmire Stadium; Cullowhee, NC	ESPN3	L 42–43	8,942
November 13	2:00 p.m.	No. 21 VMI	Paladin Stadium; Greenville, SC	ESPN+	W 37–31	6,562
November 20	1:00 p.m.	at Samford	Seibert Stadium; Homewood, AL	ESPN+	W 41-34	2,673
*Non-conference game; Rankings from STATS Poll released prior to the game; All times are in Eastern time
