= 2021 Monmouth Hawks football team =

American college football season

2021 Monmouth Hawks football
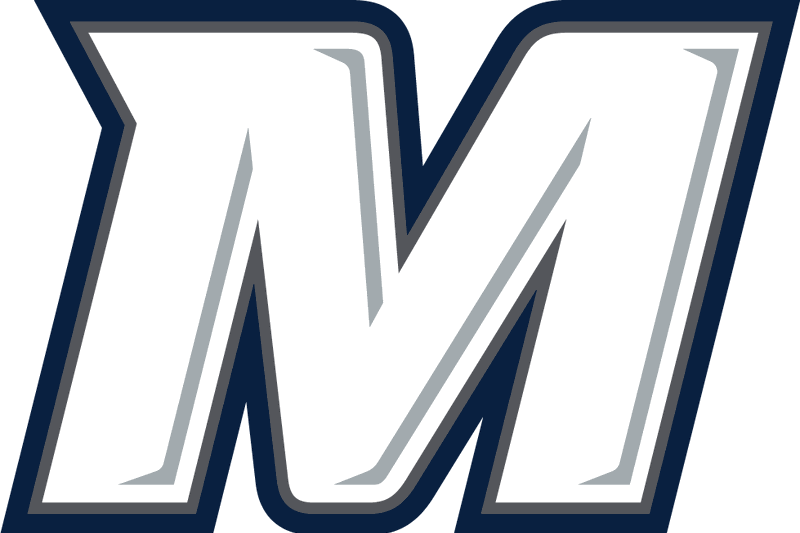
- Conference: Big South Conference
- Record: 7–4 (6–1 Big South)
- Head coach: Kevin Callahan (29th season)
- Offensive coordinator: Jeff Gallo (3rd season)
- Offensive scheme: Air raid
- Defensive coordinator: Andy Bobik (28th season)
- Base defense: 4–3
- Home stadium: Kessler Stadium

2021 Big South Conference football standings
	Conf.			Overall
Team	W		L	W		L
No. 11 Kennesaw State $^	7	–	0	11	–	2
Monmouth	6	–	1	7	–	4
North Carolina A&T	3	–	4	5	–	6
North Alabama	3	–	4	3	–	8
Charleston Southern	3	–	4	4	–	6
Hampton	3	–	4	5	–	6
Robert Morris	3	–	5	4	–	6
Campbell	2	–	5	3	–	8
Gardner–Webb	2	–	5	4	–	7
$ – Conference champion; ^ – FCS playoff participant; Rankings from STATS Poll

The 2021 Monmouth Hawks football team represented the Monmouth University during the 2021 NCAA Division I FCS football season. The Hawks played their home games at the Kessler Stadium in West Long Branch, New Jersey. The team was coached by twenty-ninth-year head coach Kevin Callahan.

This was Monmouth's final season as a member of the Big South Conference. The Hawks will be joining the Colonial Athletic Association (CAA) for all sports starting in 2022–23.

== Schedule ==
Monmouth announced its 2021 football schedule on May 27, 2021. The 2021 schedule consisted of 5 home and 6 away games in the regular season.

Date	Time	Opponent	Rank	Site	TV	Result	Attendance
September 4	7:00 p.m.	at Middle Tennessee*	No. 13	Johnny "Red" Floyd Stadium; Murfreesboro, TN	ESPN3	L 15–50	15,017
September 11	6:00 p.m.	at Fordham*	No. 20	Coffey Field; Bronx, NY	ESPN+	W 26–23	2,684
September 18	6:00 p.m.	at Charleston Southern	No. 20	Buccaneer Field; North Charleston, SC	ESPN+	W 41–14	3,801
September 25	1:00 p.m.	Holy Cross*	No. 20	Kessler Stadium; West Long Branch, NJ	ESPN+	L 15–45	4,235
October 2	1:00 p.m.	Gardner–Webb		Kessler Stadium; West Long Branch, NJ	ESPN+	W 54–17	3,278
October 9	1:00 p.m.	Princeton*		Kessler Stadium; West Long Branch, NJ	ESPN+	L 28–31	2,977
October 16	1:00 p.m.	at Campbell		Barker–Lane Stadium; Buies Creek, NC	ESPN3	W 34–17	5,108
October 30	1:00 p.m.	at North Carolina A&T		Truist Stadium; Greensboro, NC	ESPN+	W 35–16	21,500
November 6	1:00 p.m.	North Alabama		Kessler Stadium; West Long Branch, NJ	ESPN3	W 45–33	2,231
November 13	12:00 p.m.	Robert Morris		Kessler Stadium; West Long Branch, NJ	ESPN+	W 44–7	2,743
November 20	1:00 p.m.	at No. 9 Kennesaw State		Fifth Third Bank Stadium; Kennesaw, GA	ESPN+	L 17-49	4,630
*Non-conference game; Rankings from STATS Poll released prior to the game; All times are in Eastern time
