= 2021 Robert Morris Colonials football team =

American college football season

2021 Robert Morris Colonials football
- Conference: Big South Conference
- Record: 4–6 (3–5 Big South)
- Head coach: Bernard Clark (4th season)
- Offensive coordinator: Gabe Luvara (4th season)
- Defensive coordinator: Dave Plungas (4th season)
- Home stadium: Joe Walton Stadium

2021 Big South Conference football standings
	Conf.			Overall
Team	W		L	W		L
No. 11 Kennesaw State $^	7	–	0	11	–	2
Monmouth	6	–	1	7	–	4
North Carolina A&T	3	–	4	5	–	6
North Alabama	3	–	4	3	–	8
Charleston Southern	3	–	4	4	–	6
Hampton	3	–	4	5	–	6
Robert Morris	3	–	5	4	–	6
Campbell	2	–	5	3	–	8
Gardner–Webb	2	–	5	4	–	7
$ – Conference champion; ^ – FCS playoff participant; Rankings from STATS Poll

The 2021 Robert Morris Colonials football team represented the Robert Morris University during the 2021 NCAA Division I FCS football season. The Colonials played their home games at the Joe Walton Stadium in Moon Township, PA. The team was coached by fourth-year head coach Bernard Clark.

== Schedule ==
Robert Morris announced its 2021 football schedule on April 21, 2021. The 2021 schedule consisted of 5 home and 6 away games in the regular season.

Date	Time	Opponent	Site	TV	Result	Attendance
September 4	12:00 p.m.	at Dayton*	Welcome Stadium; Dayton, OH		Cancelled	
September 11	3:00 p.m.	at Central Michigan*	Kelly/Shorts Stadium; Mount Pleasant, MI	ESPN3	L 0–45	16,128
September 25	12:00 p.m.	Howard*	Joe Walton Stadium; Moon Township, PA	ESPN+	W 22–16	2,514
October 2	4:00 p.m.	at North Carolina A&T	Truist Stadium; Greensboro, NC	ESPN3	L 14–41	7,611
October 9	3:00 p.m.	Charleston Southern	Joe Walton Stadium; Moon Township, PA	ESPN+	W 31–24	2,844
October 16	6:00 p.m.	at North Alabama	Braly Municipal Stadium; Florence, AL	ESPN+	L 31–42	8,123
October 23	1:30 p.m.	at Gardner–Webb	Ernest W. Spangler Stadium; Boiling Springs, NC	ESPN+/Nexstar	L 17–28	4,529
October 30	12:00 p.m.	Hampton	Joe Walton Stadium; Moon Township, PA	ESPN3	W 38–35	1,633
November 6	12:00 p.m.	No. 12 Kennesaw State	Joe Walton Stadium; Moon Township, PA	ESPN+	L 21–45	2,144
November 13	12:00 p.m.	at Monmouth	Kessler Field; West Long Branch, NJ	ESPN+	L 7–44	2,743
November 20	12:00 p.m.	Campbell	Joe Walton Stadium; Moon Township, PA	ESPN+	W 20–17 ^{OT}	1,616
*Non-conference game; Rankings from STATS Poll released prior to the game; All times are in Eastern time

== Game summaries ==
=== At Central Michigan ===
Robert Morris at Central Michigan

Team	1	2	3	4	Total
Robert Morris	0	0	0	0	0
• Central Michigan	7	21	14	3	45

- Date: September 11, 2021
- Location: Kelly/Shorts Stadium
  Mount Pleasant, MI
- Game start: 3:00 p.m. EST
- Game attendance: 16,128
- Television network: ESPN3

Statistics	Robert Morris	Central Michigan
First downs	3	28
Total yards	109	515
Rushing yards	96	287
Passing yards	13	228
Turnovers	1	0
Time of possession	23:21	36:45

Team	Category	Player	Statistics
Robert Morris	Passing	George Martin	5/8, 13 yards
Robert Morris	Rushing	Jaylon Brown	3 carries, 37 yards
Robert Morris	Receiving	Bryce Bevins	1 reception, 12 yards
Central Michigan	Passing	Jacob Sirmon	12/16, 110 yards, 3 TDs
Central Michigan	Rushing	De'Javion Stepney	9 carries, 81 yards
Central Michigan	Receiving	Dallas Dixon	5 receptions, 73 yards, 2 TDs
