= 2021 North Carolina A&T Aggies football team =

American college football season

2021 North Carolina A&T Aggies football
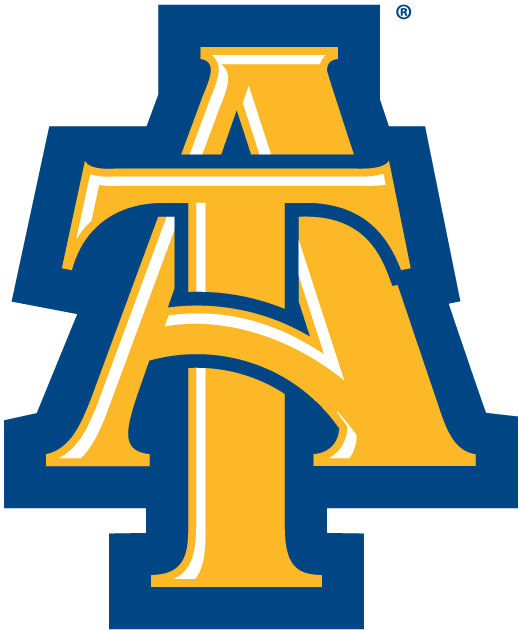
- Conference: Big South Conference
- Record: 5–6 (3–4 Big South)
- Head coach: Sam Washington (4th season)
- Offensive coordinator: Chris Barnette (4th season)
- Offensive scheme: Multiple pro-style
- Defensive coordinator: Courtney Coard (4th season)
- Base defense: 4–2–5
- Home stadium: Truist Stadium

2021 Big South Conference football standings
	Conf.			Overall
Team	W		L	W		L
No. 11 Kennesaw State $^	7	–	0	11	–	2
Monmouth	6	–	1	7	–	4
North Carolina A&T	3	–	4	5	–	6
North Alabama	3	–	4	3	–	8
Charleston Southern	3	–	4	4	–	6
Hampton	3	–	4	5	–	6
Robert Morris	3	–	5	4	–	6
Campbell	2	–	5	3	–	8
Gardner–Webb	2	–	5	4	–	7
$ – Conference champion; ^ – FCS playoff participant; Rankings from STATS Poll

The 2021 North Carolina A&T Aggies football team represented the North Carolina A&T State University during the 2021 NCAA Division I FCS football season. The Aggies played their home games at the Truist Stadium in Greensboro, North Carolina. The team was coached by fourth-year head coach Sam Washington. This was the first season for the Aggies joining the Big South Conference.

== Schedule ==
North Carolina A&T announced its 2021 football schedule on April 21, 2021. The 2021 schedule consisted of 5 home and 6 away games in the regular season.

Date	Time	Opponent	Rank	Site	TV	Result	Attendance
September 4	2:00 p.m.	at Furman*	No. 25	Paladin Stadium; Greenville, SC	Nexstar/ESPN+	L 18–29	11,628
September 10	8:00 p.m.	at Duke*		Wallace Wade Stadium; Durham, NC	ACCN	L 17–45	18,091
September 25	6:00 p.m.	North Carolina Central*		Truist Stadium; Greensboro, NC (rivalry)	ESPN+	W 37–14	15,009
October 2	4:00 p.m.	Robert Morris		Truist Stadium; Greensboro, NC	ESPN3	W 41–14	7,611
October 9	1:00 p.m.	North Alabama		Truist Stadium; Greensboro, NC	ESPN+	W 38–34	6,824
October 16	5:00 p.m.	at No. 15 Kennesaw State		Fifth Third Bank Stadium; Kennesaw, GA	ESPN+	L 0–14	9,556
October 23	2:00 p.m.	at Hampton		Armstrong Stadium; Hampton, VA	ESPN+	L 9–30	3,991
October 30	1:00 p.m.	Monmouth^{†}		Truist Stadium; Greensboro, NC	ESPN+	L 16–35	21,500
November 6	1:00 p.m.	at Charleston Southern		Buccaneer Field; North Charleston, SC	ESPN+	W 21–18	1,470
November 13	1:30 p.m.	at South Carolina State*		Oliver C. Dawson Stadium; Orangeburg, SC (rivalry)	ESPN+	W 27-17	9,169
November 20	1:00 p.m.	Gardner–Webb		Truist Stadium; Greensboro, NC	ESPN3	L 27-35	11,240
*Non-conference game; ^{†}Homecoming; Rankings from STATS Poll released prior to the game; All times are in Eastern time
