= 2021 Chattanooga Mocs football team =

American college football season

2021 Chattanooga Mocs football
- Conference: Southern Conference
- Record: 6–5 (5–3 SoCon)
- Head coach: Rusty Wright (3rd season)
- Offensive coordinator: Joe Pizzo (3rd season)
- Defensive coordinator: Lorenzo Ward (3rd season)
- Home stadium: Finley Stadium

2021 Southern Conference football standings
	Conf.			Overall
Team	W		L	W		L
No. 9 East Tennessee State $^	7	–	1	11	–	2
Mercer	6	–	2	7	–	3
Chattanooga	5	–	3	6	–	5
Western Carolina	4	–	4	4	–	7
Furman	4	–	4	6	–	5
VMI	4	–	4	6	–	5
Samford	3	–	5	4	–	7
The Citadel	3	–	5	4	–	7
Wofford	0	–	8	1	–	10
$ – Conference champion; ^ – FCS playoff participant; Rankings from STATS Poll

The 2021 Chattanooga Mocs football team represented the University of Tennessee at Chattanooga in the 2021 NCAA Division I FCS football season as a member of the Southern Conference (SoCon). The Mocs were led by second-year head coach Rusty Wright and played their home games at Finley Stadium in Chattanooga, Tennessee.

== Schedule ==
Date	Time	Opponent	Rank	Site	TV	Result	Attendance
September 2	7:30 p.m.	No. 20 Austin Peay*	No. 18	Finley Stadium; Chattanooga, TN	ESPN+	L 20–30	8,115
September 11	7:00 p.m.	at North Alabama*		Braly Municipal Stadium; Florence, AL	ESPN+	W 20–0	10,281
September 18	12:00 p.m.	at Kentucky*		Kroger Field; Lexington, KY	ESPN+/SECN+	L 23–28	55,214
October 2	1:30 p.m.	Western Carolina		Finley Stadium; Chattanooga, TN	ESPN+	W 45–17	8,520
October 9	1:30 p.m.	at VMI		Alumni Memorial Field; Lexington, VA	ESPN+	L 34–37 ^{OT}	6,000
October 16	1:30 p.m.	No. 10 East Tennessee State		Finley Stadium; Chattanooga, TN	ESPN+	W 21–16	7,838
October 23	1:00 p.m.	at Samford		Seibert Stadium; Homewood, AL	ESPN3	W 55–13	3,131
October 30	1:30 p.m.	Furman^{†}		Finley Stadium; Chattanooga, TN	ESPN+	W 13–3	6,448
November 6	1:30 p.m.	at Wofford		Gibbs Stadium; Spartanburg, SC	ESPN+	W 35–10	4,248
November 13		at Mercer	No. T–22	Moye Complex; Macon, GA	ESPN+	L 6–10	8,527
November 20	1:30 p.m.	The Citadel		Finley Stadium; Chattanooga, TN	ESPN+	L 21-24	6,489
*Non-conference game; ^{†}Homecoming; Rankings from STATS Poll released prior to the game; All times are in Eastern time
