= 2021 Wofford Terriers football team =

American college football season

2021 Wofford Terriers football
- Conference: Southern Conference
- Record: 1–10 (0–8 SoCon)
- Head coach: Josh Conklin (4th season)
- Offensive coordinator: Wade Lang (32nd season)
- Defensive coordinator: Rob Greene (2nd season)
- Home stadium: Gibbs Stadium

2021 Southern Conference football standings
	Conf.			Overall
Team	W		L	W		L
No. 9 East Tennessee State $^	7	–	1	11	–	2
Mercer	6	–	2	7	–	3
Chattanooga	5	–	3	6	–	5
Western Carolina	4	–	4	4	–	7
Furman	4	–	4	6	–	5
VMI	4	–	4	6	–	5
Samford	3	–	5	4	–	7
The Citadel	3	–	5	4	–	7
Wofford	0	–	8	1	–	10
$ – Conference champion; ^ – FCS playoff participant; Rankings from STATS Poll

The 2021 Wofford Terriers football team represented Wofford College as a member of the Southern Conference (SoCon) during the 2021 NCAA Division I FCS football season . The Terriers were led by fourth-year head coach Josh Conklin and played their home games at Gibbs Stadium in Spartanburg, South Carolina.

== Schedule ==
Date	Time	Opponent	Site	TV	Result	Attendance
September 4	2:00 p.m.	at Elon*	Rhodes Stadium; Elon, NC	FloSports	W 24–22	8,712
September 18	6:00 p.m.	No. 24 Kennesaw State*	Gibbs Stadium; Spartanburg, SC	ESPN+	L 10–31	4,597
September 25	1:30 p.m.	at No. 22 VMI	Alumni Memorial Field; Lexington, VA	ESPN3	L 23–31	5,077
October 2	3:30 p.m.	at No. 13 East Tennessee State	William B. Greene Jr. Stadium; Johnson City, TN	ESPN+	L 21–27	10,153
October 9	1:30 p.m.	Furman	Gibbs Stadium; Spartanburg, SC	ESPN+	L 20–42	6,065
October 16	1:30 p.m.	Samford	Gibbs Stadium; Spartanburg, SC		L 24–27	5,291
October 23	6:00 p.m.	at Mercer	Moye Complex; Macon, GA	ESPN+	L 14–45	7,224
October 30	1:30 p.m.	Western Carolina	Gibbs Stadium; Spartanburg, SC	ESPN+	L 21–41	3,230
November 6	1:30 p.m.	Chattanooga	Gibbs Stadium; Spartanburg, SC	ESPN+	L 10–35	4,248
November 13	2:00 p.m.	at The Citadel	Johnson Hagood Stadium; Charleston, SC	ESPN+	L 44–45	11,941
November 20	12:00 p.m.	at North Carolina*	Kenan Memorial Stadium; Chapel Hill, NC	ACCRSN	L 14–34	43,011
*Non-conference game; Rankings from STATS Poll released prior to the game; All times are in Eastern time

== Game summaries ==
=== at North Carolina ===
Wofford at North Carolina

Team	1	2	3	4	Total
Terriers	0	7	0	7	14
• Tar Heels	10	10	14	0	34

- Date: November 20, 2021
- Location: Kenan Memorial Stadium
  Chapel Hill, NC
- Game start: 12:00 p.m. EDT
- Elapsed time: 2 hours, 46 minutes
- Game attendance: 43,011
- Game weather: Temperature: 48 °F (9 °C) • Weather: Sunny • Wind: N 2 MPH
- Referee: Marcus Woods
- TV announcers (ACCRSN): Tom Werme (play-by-play), James Bates (analyst), Rebecca Fiorentino (sideline)

Scoring summary
1	10:34	UNC	Jacolby Criswell 1 yd. run (Grayson Atkins kick) (10 plays, 82 yards, 4:21)	UNC 7–0
1	2:43	UNC	Grayson Atkins 27 yd. field goal (9 plays, 60 yards, 3:49)	UNC 10–0
2	6:22	WOF	Kyle Pinnix 3 yd. run (Walker Gliarmis kick) (12 plays, 71 yards, 6:54)	UNC 10–7
2	4:47	UNC	British Brooks 38 yd. run (Grayson Atkins kick) (4 plays, 75 yards, 1:35)	UNC 17–7
2	0:00	UNC	Grayson Atkins 34 yd. field goal (11 plays, 74 yards, 1:57)	UNC 20–7
3	11:41	UNC	British Brooks 14 yd. run (Grayson Atkins kick) (5 plays, 55 yards, 1:46)	UNC 27–7
3	0:55	UNC	Kamari Morales 4 yd. pass from Drake Maye (Grayson Atkins kick) (14 plays, 84 yards, 7:05)	UNC 34–7
4	9:04	WOF	Ryan Ingram 19 yd. run (Walker Gliarmis kick) (12 plays, 75 yards, 6:51)	UNC 34–14

Statistics	WOF	UNC
First downs	18	30
Total yards	302	519
Rushing yards	209	305
Passing yards	93	214
Turnovers	1	0
Time of possession	31:18	28:42

Team	Category	Player	Statistics
Wofford	Passing	Peyton Derrick	8/10, 93 yards, INT
Wofford	Rushing	Peyton Derrick	8 carries, 69 yards
Wofford	Receiving	Jim Welsh	3 receptions, 42 yards
North Carolina	Passing	Jacolby Criswell	11/19, 125 yards
North Carolina	Rushing	British Brooks	7 carries, 89 yards, 2 TD
North Carolina	Receiving	Josh Downs	8 receptions, 89 yards
