= 2021 Charleston Southern Buccaneers football team =

American college football season

2021 Charleston Southern Buccaneers football
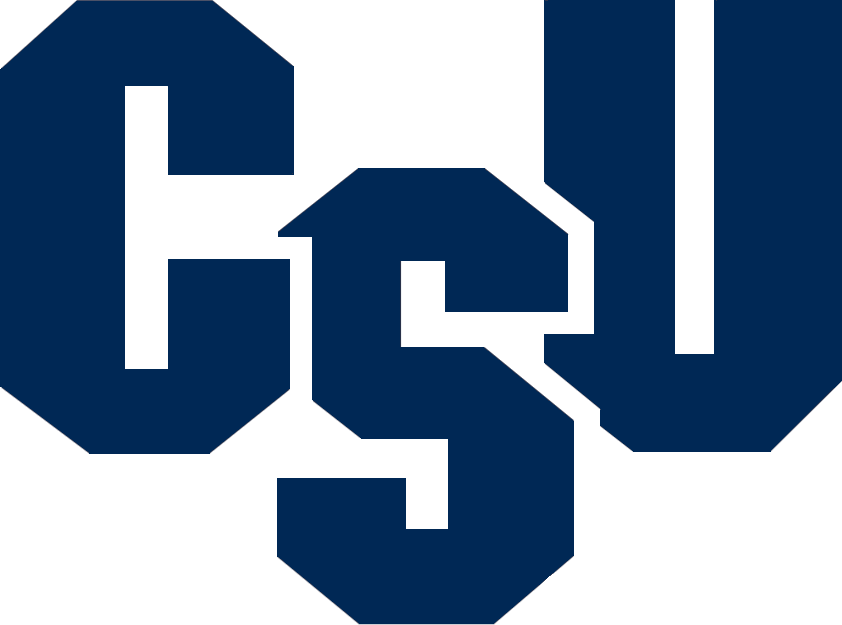
- Conference: Big South Conference
- Record: 4–6 (3–4 Big South)
- Head coach: Autry Denson (3rd season)
- Offensive coordinator: Klay Koester (2nd season)
- Defensive coordinator: Zane Vance (5th season)
- Home stadium: Buccaneer Field

2021 Big South Conference football standings
	Conf.			Overall
Team	W		L	W		L
No. 11 Kennesaw State $^	7	–	0	11	–	2
Monmouth	6	–	1	7	–	4
North Carolina A&T	3	–	4	5	–	6
North Alabama	3	–	4	3	–	8
Charleston Southern	3	–	4	4	–	6
Hampton	3	–	4	5	–	6
Robert Morris	3	–	5	4	–	6
Campbell	2	–	5	3	–	8
Gardner–Webb	2	–	5	4	–	7
$ – Conference champion; ^ – FCS playoff participant; Rankings from STATS Poll

The 2021 Charleston Southern Buccaneers football team represented Charleston Southern University as a member of the Big South Conference during the 2021 NCAA Division I FCS football season. Led by third-year head coach Autry Denson, the Buccaneers compiled an overall record of 4–6 with a mark of 3–4 in conference play, placing in a fourth-way tie for third in the Big South. Charleston Southern played home games at Buccaneer Field in Charleston, South Carolina.

== Schedule ==
Date	Time	Opponent	Site	TV	Result	Attendance
September 11	7:00 p.m.	at The Citadel*	Johnson Hagood Stadium; Charleston, SC	ESPN+	W 38–21	10,848
September 18	6:00 p.m.	No. 20 Monmouth	Buccaneer Field; North Charleston, SC	ESPN+	L 14–41	3,801
September 25	6:00 p.m.	at East Carolina*	Dowdy–Ficklen Stadium; Greenville, NC	ESPN+	L 28–31	39,218
October 9	3:00 p.m.	at Robert Morris	Joe Walton Stadium; Moon Township, PA	ESPN+	L 24–31	2,844
October 16	6:00 p.m.	Hampton	Buccaneer Field; North Charleston, SC	ESPN+	W 35–5	3,928
October 23	3:00 p.m.	at North Alabama	Braly Municipal Stadium; Florence, AL	ESPN3	L 22–45	5,647
October 30	1:00 p.m.	Campbell	Buccaneer Field; North Charleston, SC	ESPN+	W 27–14	3,208
November 6	1:00 p.m.	North Carolina A&T	Buccaneer Field; North Charleston, SC	ESPN+	L 18–21	1,470
November 13	1:00 p.m.	at Gardner–Webb	Ernest W. Spangler Stadium; Boiling Springs, NC	ESPN3	W 32–24	3,150
November 20	12:00 p.m.	at No. 1 (FBS) Georgia*	Sanford Stadium; Athens, GA	ESPN+/SECN+	L 7–56	92,746
*Non-conference game; Rankings from STATS Poll released prior to the game; All times are in Eastern time

== Game summaries ==
=== at East Carolina ===
Charleston Southern at East Carolina

Team	1	2	3	4	Total
Buccaneers	14	0	0	14	28
• Pirates	0	24	7	0	31

- Date: September 25, 2021
- Location: Dowdy–Ficklen Stadium
  Greenville, NC
- Game start: 6:05 p.m. EDT
- Elapsed time: 4 hours and 33 minutes
- Game attendance: 39,218
- Game weather: 75 °F (24 °C) • Weather: Sunny
- Referee: Edwin Lee
- TV announcers (ESPN+): Connor Onion (play–by–play) and Stanford Routt (analyst)

Scoring summary
1	10:29	CHSO	JD Moore 6-yard rush (Sam Babbush kick) (15 plays, 75 yards, 4:31)	CHSO 7–0
1	06:18	CHSO	Kale Anderson 38-yard pass from Jack Chambers (Sam Babbush kick) (8 plays, 98 yards, 2:17)	CHSO 14–0
2	13:10	ECU	Keaton Mitchell 74-yard rush (Owen Daffer kick) (2 plays, 80 yards, 0:33)	CHSO 14–7
2	07:38	ECU	Owen Daffer 33-yard field goal (11 plays, 39 yards, 3:59)	CHSO 14–10
2	05:00	ECU	Mason Garcia 3-yard rush (Owen Daffer kick) (5 plays, 55 yards, 1:56)	ECU 17–14
2	02:31	ECU	C. J. Johnson 60-yard pass from Holton Ahlers (Owen Daffer kick) (3 plays, 66 yards, 0:39)	ECU 24–14
3	11:09	ECU	Ja'Quan McMillian 23-yard interception returned (Owen Daffer kick) (3 plays, 12 yards, 0:49)	ECU 31–14
4	13:58	CHSO	Jack Chambers 8-yard rush (Sam Babbush kick) (10 plays, 81 yards, 1:59)	ECU 31–21
4	01:50	CHSO	Geoffrey Wall 2-yard pass from Jack Chambers (Sam Babbush kick) (8 plays, 86 yards, 1:21)	ECU 31–28

Statistics	Charleston Southern	East Carolina
First downs	34	14
Total yards	536	388
Rushing yards	131	150
Passing yards	405	238
Turnovers	1	2
Time of possession	31:27	28:33

Team	Category	Player	Statistics
Charleston Southern	Passing	Jack Chambers	38/61, 405 yds, 2 TD, 1 INT
Charleston Southern	Rushing	JD Moore	14 car, 58 yds, 1 TD
Charleston Southern	Receiving	Garris Schwarting	8 rec, 94 yds
East Carolina	Passing	Holton Ahlers	17/26, 238 yds, 1 TD, 2 INT
East Carolina	Rushing	Keaton Mitchell	13 car, 125 yds, 1 TD
East Carolina	Receiving	C. J. Johnson	3 rec, 95 yds, 1 TD

=== at No. 1 (FBS) Georgia ===
Game Ten – Charleston Southern Buccaneers (4–5) at No. 1 Georgia Bulldogs (10–0)

Quarter	1	2	3	4	Total
Charleston Southern	0	0	7	0	7
No. 1 (FBS) Georgia	28	21	7	0	56

at Sanford Stadium • Athens, Georgia

- Date: Saturday, November 20, 2021
- Game time: 12:00 p.m. EST
- Game weather: Clear • Temperature -
- Game attendance: 92,746
- Referee: -
- TV announcers (ESPN+): Mike Morgan (play-by-play), Charles Arbuckle (color) and Alex Chappell (sideline)
- ESPN

Game information

First quarter

- (9:01) UGA – Jordan Davis 1 Yd Run (Jack Podlesny Kick) (Georgia 7–0)
- (5:33) UGA – Kenny McIntosh 32 Yd pass from Stetson Bennett (Jack Podlesny Kick) (Georgia 14–0)
- (4:15) UGA – Zamir White 40 Yd Run (Jack Podlesny Kick) (Georgia 21–0)
- (1:29) UGA – Brock Bowers 4 Yd pass from Stetson Bennett (Jack Podlesny Kick) (Georgia 28–0)

Second quarter

- (13:39) UGA – James Cook 3 Yd Run (Jack Podlesny Kick) (Georgia 35–0)
- (6:40) UGA – Brock Bowers 7 Yd pass from JT Daniels (Jack Podlesny Kick) (Georgia 42–0)
- (1:37) UGA – Daijun Edwards 6 Yd Run (Jack Podlesny Kick) (Georgia 49–0)

Third quarter

- (5:40) CHSO - Garris Schwarting 65 Yd Fumble Return (Sam Babbush Kick) (Georgia 49-7)
- (3:26) UGA - Brett Seither 9 Yd pass from Carson Beck (Jack Podlesny Kick) (Georgia 56-7)

Fourth quarter

no scoring

Statistics	CHSO	UGA
First downs	10	22
Plays–yards	68–126	69–488
Rushes–yards	31–68	32–233
Passing yards	58	255
Passing: comp–att–int	14–37–1	20–37–2
Time of possession	31:56	28:04

Team	Category	Player	Statistics
CHSO	Passing	Jack Chambers	11/30, 55 yards, 1 INT
CHSO	Rushing	TJ Ruff	14 carries, 46 yards
CHSO	Receiving	Garris Schwarting	3 receptions, 30 yards
Georgia	Passing	Stetson Bennett	8/14, 105 yards, 2 TD, 1 INT
Georgia	Rushing	Zamir White	4 carries, 83 yards, 1 TD
Georgia	Receiving	Brett Seither	2 receptions, 39 yards, 1 TD
