= 2021 Samford Bulldogs football team =

American college football season

2021 Samford Bulldogs football
- Conference: Southern Conference
- Record: 4–7 (3–5 SoCon)
- Head coach: Chris Hatcher (7th season)
- Offensive coordinator: Mitch Stewart (1st season)
- Offensive scheme: Air raid
- Defensive coordinator: Nick Benedetto (2nd season)
- Base defense: 4–2–5
- Home stadium: Seibert Stadium

2021 Southern Conference football standings
	Conf.			Overall
Team	W		L	W		L
No. 9 East Tennessee State $^	7	–	1	11	–	2
Mercer	6	–	2	7	–	3
Chattanooga	5	–	3	6	–	5
Western Carolina	4	–	4	4	–	7
Furman	4	–	4	6	–	5
VMI	4	–	4	6	–	5
Samford	3	–	5	4	–	7
The Citadel	3	–	5	4	–	7
Wofford	0	–	8	1	–	10
$ – Conference champion; ^ – FCS playoff participant; Rankings from STATS Poll

The 2021 Samford Bulldogs football team represented Samford University in the 2021 NCAA Division I FCS football season as a member of the Southern Conference (SoCon). The Bulldogs were led by seventh-year head coach Chris Hatcher and played their home games at Seibert Stadium in Homewood, Alabama.

== Schedule ==
Date	Time	Opponent	Site	TV	Result	Attendance
September 2	7:00 p.m.	Tennessee Tech*	Seibert Stadium; Homewood, AL	ESPN+	W 52–14	3,177
September 11	6:00 p.m.	at UT Martin*	Graham Stadium; Martin, TN	ESPN+	L 27–33	5,869
September 18	2:30 p.m.	at Western Carolina	Bob Waters Field at E. J. Whitmire Stadium; Cullowhee, NC	ESPN+/Nexstar	W 42–37	9,060
September 25	2:00 p.m.	No. 15 East Tennessee State	Seibert Stadium; Homewood, AL	ESPN+	L 48–55 ^{OT}	2,106
October 2	5:00 p.m.	at Mercer	Moye Complex; Macon, GA	ESPN+	L 42–45	11,137
October 16	12:30 p.m.	at Wofford	Gibbs Stadium; Spartanburg, SC	ESPN+	W 27–24	5,291
October 23	12:00 p.m.	Chattanooga	Seibert Stadium; Homewood, AL	ESPN+	L 13–55	3,131
October 30	12:30 p.m.	at No. 18 VMI	Alumni Memorial Field; Lexington, VA	ESPN+	L 45–46	5,000
November 6	2:00 p.m.	The Citadel	Seibert Stadium; Homewood, AL	ESPN+	W 35–14	4,011
November 13	11:00 a.m.	at Florida*	Ben Hill Griffin Stadium; Gainesville, FL	SECN+/ESPN+	L 52–70	70,098
November 20	12:00 p.m.	Furman	Seibert Stadium; Homewood, AL	ESPN+	L 34–41	2,673
*Non-conference game; Rankings from STATS Poll released prior to the game; All times are in Eastern time

== Game summaries ==
=== Tennessee Tech ===
Tennessee Tech Golden Eagles at Samford Bulldogs – Game summary

Quarter	1	2	3	4	Total
Golden Eagles	0	7	7	0	14
Bulldogs	14	3	21	14	52

at Seibert Stadium, Homewood, Alabama

- Date: September 2
- Game time: 7:00 p.m. CDT
- Game weather: Sunny and clear, 83 °F (28 °C)
- Game attendance: 3,177
- Referee: Bruce Austin
- TV: ESPN+
- Box score, Recap

Game information
First quarter
- SAM – Michael Vice 24-yard pass from Liam Welch (Zach Williams kick), 6:50. Bulldogs 7–0. Drive: 5 plays, 79 yards, 1:21.
- SAM – Montrell Washington 62-yard punt return (Zach Williams kick), 3:49. Bulldogs 14–0.

Second quarter

- SAM – Zach Williams 24-yard field goal, 7:28. Bulldogs 17–0. Drive: 16 plays, 57 yards, 3:58.
- TNTC – Justin Oden 10-yard pass from Davis Shanley (Hayden Olsen kick), 2:25. Bulldogs 17–7. Drive: 8 plays, 75 yards, 5:03.

Third quarter

- TNTC – David Gist 3-yard run (Hayden Olsen kick), 9:25. Bulldogs 17–14. Drive: 11 plays, 75 yards, 5:35.
- SAM – A. J. Toney 8-yard pass from Liam Welch (Zach Williams kick), 6:18. Bulldogs 24–14. Drive: 12 plays, 69 yards, 3:02.
- SAM – DeMarcus Ware II 10-yard run (Zach Williams kick), 4:31. Bulldogs 31–14. Drive: 3 plays, 56 yards, 0:50.
- SAM – Ty King 7-yard pass from Liam Welch (Zach Williams kick), 0:39. Bulldogs 38–14. Drive: 5 plays, 75 yards, 1:26.

Fourth quarter

- SAM – Jay Stanton 1-yard run (Zach Williams kick), 14:34. Bulldogs 45–14. Drive: 2 plays, 2 yards, 0:26.
- SAM – Jai'Rus Creamer 11-yard pass from Liam Welch (Zach Williams kick), 7:58. Bulldogs 52–14. Drive: 10 plays, 43 yards, 4:03.

Statistics	TNTC	SAM
First downs	14	22
Total yards	231	475
Rushing yards	69	105
Passing yards	162	370
Turnovers	1	0
Time of possession	33:53	26:07

Team	Category	Player	Statistics
Tennessee Tech	Passing	Davis Shanley	19/34, 159 yards, TD, INT
Tennessee Tech	Rushing	David Gist	17 rushes, 72 yards, TD
Tennessee Tech	Receiving	Quinton Cross	8 receptions, 57 yards
Samford	Passing	Liam Welch	33/44, 370 yards, 4 TD
Samford	Rushing	DeMarcus Ware II	8 rushes, 32 yards, TD
Samford	Receiving	Montrell Washington	8 receptions, 170 yards

=== At Florida ===
Samford Bulldogs at Florida Gators – Game summary

Quarter	1	2	3	4	Total
Bulldogs	21	21	0	10	52
Gators	14	21	21	14	70

at Ben Hill Griffin Stadium, Gainesville, Florida

- Date: November 13
- Game time: 11:00 a.m. CST/12:00 p.m. EST
- Game weather: Rain, 64 °F (18 °C)
- Game attendance: 70,098
- Referee: Lee Hedrick
- TV announcers (ESPN+/SECN+): Mike Couzens and Dustin Fox
- Box score, Recap

Game information

First quarter

- SAM – Montrell Washington 1 yard pass from Liam Welch (Zach Williams kick), 10:26. Bulldogs 7–0. Drive: 13 plays, 75 yards, 4:34.
- FLA – Malik Davis 6-yard run (Chris Howard kick), 6:56. Tied 7–7. Drive: 9 plays, 65 yards, 3:30.
- SAM – Michael Vice 58-yard pass from Liam Welch (Zach Williams kick), 4:53. Bulldogs 14–7. Drive: 7 plays, 75 yards, 2:03.
- FLA – Ja'Markis Weston 9-yard pass from Emory Jones (Chris Howard kick), 4:02. Tied 14–14. Drive: 2 plays, 55 yards, 0:40.
- SAM – Jay Stanton 40-yard pass from Liam Welch (Zach Williams kick), 1:25. Bulldogs 21–14. Drive: 7 plays, 79 yards, 2:30.

Second quarter

- FLA – Emory Jones 31-yard run (Chris Howard kick), 14:19. Tied 21–21. Drive: 5 plays, 75 yards, 2:06.
- SAM – Liam Welch 4-yard run (Zach Williams kick), 10:02. Bulldogs 28–21. Drive: 3 plays, 44 yards, 0:50.
- FLA – Dameon Pierce 1 yard run (Chris Howard kick), 8:10. Tied 28–28. Drive: 5 plays, 78 yards, 1:46.
- SAM – Montrell Washington 98-yard kickoff return (Zach Williams kick), 7:55. Bulldogs 35–28. Drive: 3 plays, 5 yards, 1:49.
- SAM – Liam Welch 10-yard run (Zach Williams kick), 3:17. Bulldogs 42–28. Drive: 8 plays, 87 yards, 2:42.
- FLA – Nay'Quan Wright 45-yard pass from Emory Jones (Chris Howard kick), 1:03. Bulldogs 42–35. Drive: 8 plays, 78 yards, 2:06.

Third quarter

- FLA – Malik Davis 48-yard pass from Emory Jones (Chris Howard kick), 12:34. Tied 42–42. Drive: 5 plays, 85 yards, 2:19.
- FLA – Kemore Gamble 7-yard pass from Emory Jones (Chris Howard kick), 6:12. Gators 49–42. Drive: 9 plays, 70 yards, 4:19.
- FLA – Dameon Pierce 13-yard pass from Emory Jones (Chris Howard kick), 1:24. Gators 56–42. Drive: 5 plays, 52 yards, 2:33.

Fourth quarter

- SAM – Montrell Washington 23-yard pass from Liam Welch (Zach Williams kick), 13:59. Gators 56–49. Drive: 7 plays, 75 yards, 2:25.
- SAM – Zach Williams 33-yard field goal, 11:59. Gators 56–52. Drive: 10 plays, 36 yards, 1:58.
- FLA – Kemore Gamble 18-yard pass from Emory Jones (Chris Howard kick), 9:03. Gators 63–52. Drive: 6 plays, 78 yards, 2:49.
- FLA – Dameon Pierce 24-yard run (Chris Howard kick), 5:37. Gators 70–52. Drive: 4 plays, 35 yards, 2:05.

Statistics	SAM	FLA
First downs	28	30
Total yards	530	717
Rushing yards	114	253
Passing yards	416	464
Turnovers	1	0
Time of possession	28:51	31:22

Team	Category	Player	Statistics
Samford	Passing	Liam Welch	33/52, 400 yards, 3 TD, INT
Samford	Rushing	Liam Welch	16 rushes, 65 yards, 2 TD
Samford	Receiving	Montrell Washington	10 receptions, 124 yards, TD
Florida	Passing	Emory Jones	28/34, 464 yards, 6 TD
Florida	Rushing	Emory Jones	10 rushes, 86 yards, TD
Florida	Receiving	Kemore Gamble	6 receptions, 122 yards, 2 TD
