= 2021 VMI Keydets football team =

American college football season

2021 VMI Keydets football
- Conference: Southern Conference
- Record: 6–5 (4–4 SoCon)
- Head coach: Scott Wachenheim (7th season)
- Offensive coordinator: Billy Cosh (2nd season)
- Defensive coordinator: Tom Clark (7th season)
- Home stadium: Alumni Memorial Field

2021 Southern Conference football standings
	Conf.			Overall
Team	W		L	W		L
No. 9 East Tennessee State $^	7	–	1	11	–	2
Mercer	6	–	2	7	–	3
Chattanooga	5	–	3	6	–	5
Western Carolina	4	–	4	4	–	7
Furman	4	–	4	6	–	5
VMI	4	–	4	6	–	5
Samford	3	–	5	4	–	7
The Citadel	3	–	5	4	–	7
Wofford	0	–	8	1	–	10
$ – Conference champion; ^ – FCS playoff participant; Rankings from STATS Poll

The 2021 VMI Keydets football team represented the Virginia Military Institute in the 2021 NCAA Division I FCS football season as a member of the Southern Conference (SoCon). The Keydets were led by seventh-year head coach Scott Wachenheim and played their home games at Alumni Memorial Field in Lexington, Virginia.

== Schedule ==
Date	Time	Opponent	Rank	Site	TV	Result	Attendance
September 4	1:30 p.m.	Davidson*	No. 17	Alumni Memorial Field; Lexington, VA	ESPN+	W 45–24	5,009
September 11	11:30 a.m.	at Kent State*	No. 18	Dix Stadium; Kent, OH	ESPN3	L 10–60	16,785
September 18	2:00 p.m.	at Cornell*	No. 22	Schoellkopf Field; Ithaca, NY	ESPN+	W 31–21	12,555
September 25	1:30 p.m.	Wofford	No. 22	Alumni Memorial Field; Lexington, VA	ESPN3	W 31–23	5,077
October 2	2:00 p.m.	at The Citadel	No. 18	Johnson Hagood Stadium; Charleston, SC	ESPN+	L 24–35	12,097
October 9	1:30 p.m.	Chattanooga		Alumni Memorial Field; Lexington, VA	ESPN+	W 37–34 ^{OT}	6,000
October 16	4:00 p.m.	at Mercer		Moye Complex; Macon, GA	ESPN+	W 45–7	7,227
October 30	1:30 p.m.	Samford	No. 18	Alumni Memorial Field; Lexington, VA	ESPN+	W 46–45	5,000
November 6	1:00 p.m.	at No. 14 East Tennessee State	No. 18	William B. Greene Jr. Stadium; Johnson City, TN	ESPN+	L 20–27	10,416
November 13	2:00 p.m.	at Furman	No. 21	Paladin Stadium; Greenville, SC	ESPN+	L 31–37	6,562
November 20	1:30 p.m.	Western Carolina		Alumni Memorial Field; Lexington, VA	ESPN+	L 24-52	5,000
*Non-conference game; Rankings from STATS Poll released prior to the game; All times are in Eastern time
