= 2021 North Alabama Lions football team =

American college football season

2021 North Alabama Lions football
- Conference: Big South Conference
- Record: 3–8 (3–4 Big South)
- Head coach: Chris Willis (5th season)
- Offensive coordinator: Zach Lisko (2nd season)
- Defensive coordinator: Steadman Campbell (4th season)
- Home stadium: Braly Municipal Stadium

2021 Big South Conference football standings
	Conf.			Overall
Team	W		L	W		L
No. 11 Kennesaw State $^	7	–	0	11	–	2
Monmouth	6	–	1	7	–	4
North Carolina A&T	3	–	4	5	–	6
North Alabama	3	–	4	3	–	8
Charleston Southern	3	–	4	4	–	6
Hampton	3	–	4	5	–	6
Robert Morris	3	–	5	4	–	6
Campbell	2	–	5	3	–	8
Gardner–Webb	2	–	5	4	–	7
$ – Conference champion; ^ – FCS playoff participant; Rankings from STATS Poll

The 2021 North Alabama Lions football team represented the University of North Alabama during the 2021 NCAA Division I FCS football season. The Lions played their home games at the Braly Municipal Stadium in Florence, Alabama. The team was coached by fifth-year head coach Chris Willis.

== Schedule ==
North Alabama announced its 2021 football schedule on April 21, 2021. The 2021 schedule consists of five home and six away games in the regular season.

Date	Time	Opponent	Site	TV	Result	Attendance
September 4	6:00 p.m.	No. 15 Southeastern Louisiana*	Braly Municipal Stadium; Florence, AL (Note: North Alabama's game against Southeastern Louisiana was originally scheduled to be played as an away game, in Hammond, Louisiana, but the game was moved to Florence on August 31, 2021, due to safety concerns related to Hurricane Ida.)	ESPN3	L 28–49	3,433
September 11	7:00 p.m.	Chattanooga*	Braly Municipal Stadium; Florence, AL	ESPN+/WHDF	L 0–20	10,281
September 18	6:00 p.m.	at No. 10 Jacksonville State*	Burgess–Snow Field at JSU Stadium; Jacksonville, AL	ESPN+	L 24–27	20,992
September 25	3:00 p.m.	at Nicholls*	John L. Guidry Stadium; Thibodaux, LA	ESPN+	L 14–31	7,314
October 2	6:00 p.m.	Campbell	Braly Municipal Stadium; Florence, AL	ESPN+	L 31–48	6,533
October 9	12:00 p.m.	at North Carolina A&T	Truist Stadium; Greensboro, NC	ESPN+/Nexstar	L 34-38	6,824
October 16	6:00 p.m.	Robert Morris^{†}	Braly Municipal Stadium; Florence, AL	ESPN+	W 42–31	8,123
October 23	2:00 p.m.	Charleston Southern	Braly Municipal Stadium; Florence, AL	ESPN3	W 45-22	5,647
November 6	12:00 p.m.	at Monmouth	Kessler Field; West Long Branch, NJ	ESPN3	L 33-45	2,231
November 13	2:00 p.m.	No. 10 Kennesaw State	Braly Municipal Stadium; Florence, AL	ESPN+	L 24-28	7,023
November 20	12:00 p.m.	at Hampton	Armstrong Stadium; Hampton, VA	ESPN+	W 35-27	1,500
*Non-conference game; ^{†}Homecoming; Rankings from STATS Poll released prior to the game; All times are in Central time

== Game summaries ==
=== No. 15 Southeastern Louisiana ===
Southeastern Louisiana at North Alabama

Team	1	2	3	4	Total
• No. 15 SLU Lions	7	7	13	22	49
UNA Lions	0	14	7	7	28

- Date: September 4, 2021
- Location: Braly Municipal Stadium
  Florence, AL
- Game start: 6:00 p.m. CDT
- Elapsed time: 3 hours and 36 minutes
- Game attendance: 3,433
- Game weather: • Weather: TBD • Wind: TBD
- Referee: Drew Myers
- TV announcers (ESPN3):

Scoring summary
1	0:43	SLU	Nolan Givan 4-yard pass from Cole Kelley (Mateo Rengifo kick) (7 plays, 67 yards, 3:24)	SLU 7–0
2	13:03	UNA	Corson Swan 29-yard pass from Jaylen Gipson (Sam Contorno kick) (1 play, 29 yards, 0:13)	TIED 7–7
2	6:12	SLU	Cephus Johnson III 13-yard pass from Cole Kelley (Mateo Rengifo kick) (17 plays, 68 yards, 6:51)	SLU 14–7
2	1:39	UNA	Kennebrew Tak. 40-yard pass from Jaylen Gipson (Easterling Gra. kick) (8 plays, 75 yards, 4:33)	TIED 14–14
3	11:40	SLU	Austi Mitchell 1-yard pass from Cole Kelley (Mateo Rengifo kick failed) (7 plays, 61 yards, 3:20)	SLU 20–14
3	9:37	UNA	Takairee Kennebrew 47-yard pass from Jaylen Gipson (Easterling Gra. kick) (4 plays, 75 yards, 2:03)	UNA 21–20
3	6:37	SLU	Taron Jones 3-yard run (Mateo Rengifo kick) (7 plays, 75 yards, 3:00)	SLU 27–21
4	13:07	SLU	Cole Kelley 9-yard run (Nolan Givan pass) (13 plays, 99 yards, 6:29)	SLU 35–21
4	12:38	SLU	Ferland Jordan 41-yard interception (Mateo Rengifo kick)	SLU 42–21
4	10:21	UNA	Takairee Kennebrew 24-yard pass from Jaylen Gipson (Easterling Gra. kick) (8 plays, 75 yards, 2:17)	SLU 42–28
4	0:44	SLU	Cephus Johnson III 15-yard run (Mateo Rengifo kick) (6 plays, 79 yards, 3:38)	SLU 49–28

Statistics	Southeastern Louisiana	North Alabama
First downs	30	23
Total yards	495	404
Rushing yards	232	54
Passing yards	263	350
Turnovers	2	1
Time of possession	36:49	23:11

Team	Category	Player	Statistics
Southeastern Louisiana	Passing	Cole Kelley	30/41, 263 yards, 3 TD
Southeastern Louisiana	Rushing	Taron Jones	11 carries, 85 yards, 1 TD
Southeastern Louisiana	Receiving	CJ Turner	3 receptions, 52 yards
North Alabama	Passing	Jaylen Gipson	23/46, 350 yards, 4 TD, 1 INT
North Alabama	Rushing	Jaylen Gipson	7 carries, 22 yards
North Alabama	Receiving	Takairee Kennebrew	7 receptions, 132 yards, 3 TD
