= 2021 The Citadel Bulldogs football team =

American college football season

2021 The Citadel Bulldogs football
- Conference: Southern Conference
- Record: 4–7 (3–5 SoCon)
- Head coach: Brent Thompson (6th season)
- Offensive coordinator: Lou Conte (6th season)
- Offensive scheme: Triple option
- Defensive coordinator: Tony Grantham (3rd season)
- Base defense: 3–4
- Home stadium: Johnson Hagood Stadium

2021 Southern Conference football standings
| | Conf. | | | Overall |
| Team | W | | L | W | | L |
|---|---|---|---|---|---|---|
| No. 9 East Tennessee State $^ | 7 | – | 1 | 11 | – | 2 |
| Mercer | 6 | – | 2 | 7 | – | 3 |
| Chattanooga | 5 | – | 3 | 6 | – | 5 |
| Western Carolina | 4 | – | 4 | 4 | – | 7 |
| Furman | 4 | – | 4 | 6 | – | 5 |
| VMI | 4 | – | 4 | 6 | – | 5 |
| Samford | 3 | – | 5 | 4 | – | 7 |
| The Citadel | 3 | – | 5 | 4 | – | 7 |
| Wofford | 0 | – | 8 | 1 | – | 10 |
$ – Conference champion; ^ – FCS playoff participant; Rankings from STATS Poll

The 2021 The Citadel Bulldogs football team represented The Citadel in the 2021 NCAA Division I FCS football season as a member of the Southern Conference (SoCon). The Bulldogs were led by sixth-year head coach Brent Thompson and played their home games at Johnson Hagood Stadium in Charleston, South Carolina.

== Schedule ==
| Date | Time | Opponent | Site | TV | Result | Attendance |
|---|---|---|---|---|---|---|
| September 2 | 2:00 p.m. | at No. 22 (FBS) Coastal Carolina* | Brooks Stadium; Conway, SC | ESPN+ | L 14–52 | 16,236 |
| September 11 | 7:00 p.m. | Charleston Southern* | Johnson Hagood Stadium; Charleston, SC | | L 21–38 | 10,848 |
| September 18 | 6:00 p.m. | North Greenville* | Johnson Hagood Stadium; Charleston, SC | ESPN+ | W 45–13 | 8,159 |
| October 2 | 2:00 p.m. | No. 18 VMI | Johnson Hagood Stadium; Charleston, SC (Military Classic of the South) | | W 35–24 | 12,097 |
| October 9 | 4:30 p.m. | at No. 12 East Tennessee State | William B. Greene Jr. Stadium; Johnson City, TN | ESPN+ | L 21–48 | 9,202 |
| October 16 | 6:00 p.m. | at Furman | Paladin Stadium; Greenville, SC (rivalry) | ESPN3 | L 14–24 | 10,164 |
| October 23 | 2:00 p.m. | Western Carolina | Johnson Hagood Stadium; Charleston, SC | ESPN+ | L 31–45 | 8,411 |
| October 30 | 2:00 p.m. | Mercer | Johnson Hagood Stadium; Charleston, SC | ESPN3 | L 7–24 | 8,438 |
| November 6 | 2:00 p.m. | at Samford | Seibert Stadium; Homewood, AL | ESPN+ | L 14–35 | 4,011 |
| November 13 | 2:00 p.m. | Wofford | Johnson Hagood Stadium; Charleston, SC (rivalry) | ESPN+ | W 45–44 | 11,941 |
| November 20 | 1:30 p.m. | at Chattanooga | Finley Stadium; Chattanooga, TN | ESPN+ | W 24-21 | 6,489 |
*Non-conference game; Rankings from STATS Poll released prior to the game; All times are in Eastern time
