= 2021 Western Carolina Catamounts football team =

American college football season

2021 Western Carolina Catamounts football
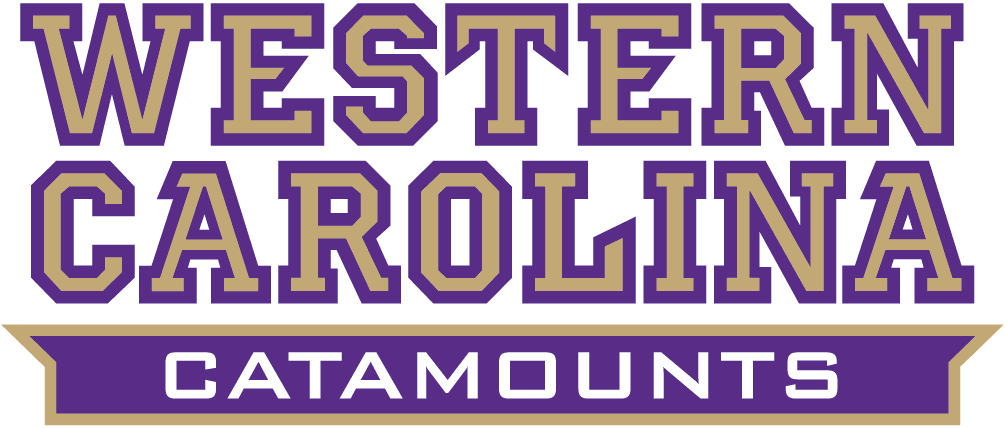
- Conference: Southern Conference
- Record: 4–7 (4–4 SoCon)
- Head coach: Kerwin Bell (1st season)
- Offensive coordinator: Kade Bell (1st season)
- Offensive scheme: No-huddle spread
- Co-defensive coordinators: Justin Hinds (1st season); Chaz Scales (1st season)
- Base defense: 4–3
- Home stadium: Bob Waters Field at E. J. Whitmire Stadium

2021 Southern Conference football standings
	Conf.			Overall
Team	W		L	W		L
No. 9 East Tennessee State $^	7	–	1	11	–	2
Mercer	6	–	2	7	–	3
Chattanooga	5	–	3	6	–	5
Western Carolina	4	–	4	4	–	7
Furman	4	–	4	6	–	5
VMI	4	–	4	6	–	5
Samford	3	–	5	4	–	7
The Citadel	3	–	5	4	–	7
Wofford	0	–	8	1	–	10
$ – Conference champion; ^ – FCS playoff participant; Rankings from STATS Poll

The 2021 Western Carolina Catamounts football team represented the Western Carolina University as a member of the Southern Conference (SoCon) during the 2021 NCAA Division I FCS football season. Led by first-year head coach Kerwin Bell, the Catamounts compiled an overall record of 4–7 with a mark of 4–4 in conference play, tying for fourth place in the SoCon. Western Carolina played home games at Bob Waters Field at E. J. Whitmire Stadium in Cullowhee, North Carolina.

== Schedule ==
Date	Time	Opponent	Site	TV	Result	Attendance
September 4	6:00 p.m.	Eastern Kentucky*	Bob Waters Field at E. J. Whitmire Stadium; Cullowhee, NC	ESPN+/Nexstar	L 28–31	9,647
September 11	7:00 p.m.	at No. 4 (FBS) Oklahoma*	Gaylord Family Oklahoma Memorial Stadium; Norman, OK	PPV	L 0–76	83,538
September 18	3:30 p.m.	Samford	Bob Waters Field at E. J. Whitmire Stadium; Cullowhee, NC	ESPN+/Nexstar	L 37–42	9,060
September 25	6:00 p.m.	at Gardner–Webb*	Ernest W. Spangler Stadium; Boiling Springs, NC	ESPN+	L 34–52	5,689
October 2	1:30 p.m.	at Chattanooga	Finley Stadium; Chattanooga, TN	ESPN+	L 17–45	8,520
October 9	3:30 p.m.	Mercer	Bob Waters Field at E. J. Whitmire Stadium; Cullowhee, NC	ESPN+	L 24–34	11,123
October 23	2:00 p.m.	at The Citadel	Johnson Hagood Stadium; Charleston, SC	ESPN+	W 45–31	8,411
October 30	1:30 p.m.	at Wofford	Gibbs Stadium; Spartanburg, SC	ESPN+	W 41–21	3,230
November 6	2:00 p.m.	Furman	Bob Waters Field at E. J. Whitmire Stadium; Cullowhee, NC	ESPN+	W 43–42	8,942
November 13	2:00 p.m.	No. 11 East Tennessee State	Bob Waters Field at E. J. Whitmire Stadium; Cullowhee, NC	ESPN+	L 35–56	10,348
November 20	1:30 p.m.	at VMI	Alumni Memorial Field; Lexington, VA	ESPN+	W 52–24	5,000
*Non-conference game; Rankings from STATS Poll released prior to the game; All times are in Eastern time

== Coaching staff ==
Coaches for the 2021 season
Name	Position	Seasons at Western Carolina
Kerwin Bell	Head coach	1st
Justin Hinds	Defensive Coordinator/Linebackers	1st
Kade Bell	Offensive Coordinator/Quarterbacks	1st
Kerry Webb	Special Teams Coordinator/Nickles	1st
Chaz Scales	co-Defensive Coordinator/Defensive Backs	1st
JJ Laster	Wide Receivers	1st
Larry Murphy	Cornerbacks	1st
John Peacock	Offensive Line	1st
Rudi Small	Running Backs	1st
Dennis Thomas	Defensive Line	1st
Rylan Wells	Tight Ends / Fullbacks	1st
