= 2021 Mercer Bears football team =

American college football season

2021 Mercer Bears football
- Conference: Southern Conference
- Record: 7–3 (6–2 SoCon)
- Head coach: Drew Cronic (2nd season)
- Co-offensive coordinators: Bob Bodine (2nd season); Tim Foster (2nd season)
- Defensive coordinator: Joel Taylor (2nd season)
- Home stadium: Moye Complex

2021 Southern Conference football standings
	Conf.			Overall
Team	W		L	W		L
No. 9 East Tennessee State $^	7	–	1	11	–	2
Mercer	6	–	2	7	–	3
Chattanooga	5	–	3	6	–	5
Western Carolina	4	–	4	4	–	7
Furman	4	–	4	6	–	5
VMI	4	–	4	6	–	5
Samford	3	–	5	4	–	7
The Citadel	3	–	5	4	–	7
Wofford	0	–	8	1	–	10
$ – Conference champion; ^ – FCS playoff participant; Rankings from STATS Poll

The 2021 Mercer Bears football team represented Mercer University in the 2021 NCAA Division I FCS football season as a member of the Southern Conference (SoCon). The Bears were led by second-year head coach Drew Cronic and played their home games at Moye Complex in Macon, Georgia.

== Schedule ==
Date	Time	Opponent	Rank	Site	TV	Result	Attendance
September 2	7:00 p.m.	Point*		Moye Complex; Macon, GA	ESPN+	W 69–0	8,727
September 11	4:00 p.m.	at No. 1 (FBS) Alabama*		Bryant–Denny Stadium; Tuscaloosa, AL	SEC Network	L 14–48	95,396
September 25	2:00 p.m.	at Furman		Paladin Stadium; Greenville, SC	ESPN+	W 24–3	10,203
October 2	6:00 p.m.	Samford		Moye Complex; Macon, GA	ESPN+	W 45–42	11,137
October 9	3:30 p.m.	at Western Carolina		Bob Waters Field at E. J. Whitmire Stadium; Cullowhee, NC	ESPN+	W 34–24	11,123
October 16	4:00 p.m.	VMI		Moye Complex; Macon, GA	ESPN+	L 7–45	7,227
October 23	6:00 p.m.	Wofford		Moye Complex; Macon, GA	ESPN+/Nexstar	W 45–14	7,224
October 30	2:00 p.m.	at The Citadel		Johnson Hagood Stadium; Charleston, SC	ESPN+	W 34–7	8,438
November 13	3:00 p.m.	No. T–22 Chattanooga		Moye Complex; Macon, GA	ESPN+	W 10–6	8,527
November 20	1:00 p.m.	at No. 8 East Tennessee State	No. 21	William B. Greene Jr. Stadium; Johnson City, TN	ESPN3	L 35–38	10,594
*Non-conference game; Rankings from STATS Poll released prior to the game; All times are in Eastern time

== Roster ==
2021 Mercer Bears football team roster
Players
Coaches
Offense

Pos.	#	Name	Class
WR	1	Devron Harper	So
QB	4	Fred Payton	Jr
RB	5	Fred Davis	Fr
QB	6	Dylan Fromm	Fr
JK	7	Ethan Dirrim	Fr
RB	8	Brandon Marshall	Fr
JK	10	Parker Wroble	Fr
JK	11	Brandon Mays	So
WR	13	Ty James	Fr
QB	15	Carter Peevy	Fr
JK	16	Dyvon McKinney	Fr
JK	17	Landon Miller	So
QB	19	Anthony Squitieri	Fr
JK	21	Tayshaun Shipp	Fr
JK	27	Jacob Walker	Fr
RB	29	Al Wooten II	Fr
RB	35	Langston White	Fr
RB	36	Justin Coleman	Fr
OL	50	Obinna Nwankwo	Sr
OL	51	Jason Poe	Sr
OL	57	John Harris	So
OL	58	Tyzen Wilkerson	Fr
OL	59	Clay Baker	Fr
OL	60	Conner Krieger	Sr
OL	61	Pierce Vickery	Fr
OL	64	Riley Adcock	Fr
OL	66	Thomas Steibly	Fr
OL	67	Ni Mansell	Fr
OL	68	Nate Howard	Fr
OL	70	Santo DeFranco	So
OL	71	Daniel Tulk	Fr
OL	73	John Thomas	So
OL	74	Luke Barlow	Fr
OL	78	Peyton Bumpers	Fr
OL	79	Ari Kamau	Fr
TE	81	Bryce Lawrence	So
TE	82	Andrew May	Fr
TE	83	Drake Starks	Jr
JK	85	Brendan Hunt	Fr
TE	86	Luke Szabados	Fr
WR	88	Jaylin Peterson	Fr
TE	89	Mac Johnson	Fr
OL	-	Jonathan Bacigalupi	Fr
WR	-	Nate Boehm	Fr
OL	-	Aidan Higgins	Fr
OL	-	Tim Maddox	Fr

Defense

Pos.	#	Name	Class
S	0	Lance Wise	So
CB	2	Yahsyn McKee	So
LB	3	Isaac Dowling	Fr
CB	9	Michael Campbell	Jr
S	12	Harrison Poole	Sr
CB	18	Corey Barnes	Fr
S	20	Richie Coffey	So
S	22	DQ Wilkerson	So
LB	24	Danijah Gammage	Jr
CB	25	TJ Moore	Fr
S	26	Byron Bacon	Fr
CB	28	Kenyatta Ward	Fr
S	30	Rick Lester III	So
S	31	Luke Ward	Jr
S	32	Kainalu Pu’u Robinson	Fr
S	34	Myles Redding	Fr
S	37	Kenyan Hunter	Fr
OLB	40	Jordan Williams	Sr
LB	41	Zach Hopkins	So
OLB	42	Alvin Ward Jr.	Sr
OLB	43	Myles Jones	Fr
DL	44	Richard Benton Jr.	Fr
LB	47	Tommy Pollack	Fr
DL	48	Solomon Zubairu	So
LB	49	Chris Taylor	Fr
DL	52	Tre Lanham	Sr
LB	53	Royce Izundu	Fr
LB	54	Ken Standley	Fr
LB	55	Marques Thomas	Fr
DL	56	Carson Griffin	Fr
OLB	65	Cyril Turner	Fr
DL	76	Vinny Carnazzo	Fr
OLB	90	Emil Hovde	Fr
DL	91	Jordan Swain	Fr
DL	94	Savio Frazier	Fr
DL	95	Barron King	Jr
DL	98	Chris Hill	Fr
DL	99	DJ McDaniel	Jr
CB	-	Brogan Korta	Fr
S	-	Liam Lewis	Fr
CB	-	Kyle Lindsay	So
S	-	Gavin Spratt	Fr
S	-	John Stegenga	Fr
S	-	Jack Shryock	Fr

Special teams

Pos.	#	Name	Class
LS	62	Zach Lassiter	So
LS	69	Philip Hatcher	So
LS	80	Reid Brass	Fr
K	92	Caleb Dowden	So
K	93	Devin Folser	So
P	97	Trey Turk	Fr
K	-	Brinson Sumner	Fr

Head coach

- Drew Cronic (Head Coach)

Coordinators/assistant coaches

- David A. Cole (Associate HC / Cornerbacks / Specialists)
- Bob Bodinel (Co-Offensive Coordinator / Offensive Line)
- Tim Foster (Co-Offensive Coordinator / Jokers)
- Joel Taylor (Defensive Coordinator / Linebackers)
- Mike Adams (Defensive Pass Game Coordinator / Safeties)
- Sumner Ellis (Defensive Ends / Defensive Recruiting Coordinator)
- La’Donte Harris (Wide Receivers / Offensive Recruiting Coordinator)
- Jimmy Long (Defensive Run Game Coordinator / Defensive Line)
- Kevin O’Brien (Tight Ends)
- John Russ (Running Backs / Video Coordinator)
- Brandon Wright (Offensive Analyst)
- Devin Bledsoe (Defensive Analyst)
- Montralius Mosley (Volunteer Assistant Offense)
- Alex Collier (Volunteer Assistant Defense)
- Bennett Houston (Director of Football Operations)
- Drew Tranum (Head Equipment Manager)
- Clarence Powell (Coordinator of Football Creative Services)
- Evan Barr (Director of Strength & Conditioning)
- Jackson Morris (Assistant Football Strength & Conditioning)
- Marques White (Assistant Football Strength & Conditioning)
- Josh Huff (Strength & Conditioning Graduate Assistant)

Legend

- (C) Team captain
- (S) Suspended
- (I) Ineligible
- Injured
- Redshirt

Roster
Last update: July 1, 2021
