= 2021 Gardner–Webb Runnin' Bulldogs football team =

American college football season

2021 Gardner–Webb Runnin' Bulldogs football
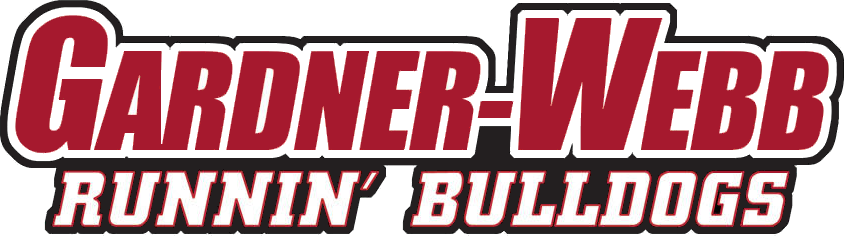
- Conference: Big South Conference
- Record: 4–7 (2–5 Big South)
- Head coach: Tre Lamb (2nd season)
- Offensive coordinator: Taylor Lamb (1st season)
- Defensive coordinator: Josh Reardon (2nd season)
- Home stadium: Ernest W. Spangler Stadium

2021 Big South Conference football standings
	Conf.			Overall
Team	W		L	W		L
No. 11 Kennesaw State $^	7	–	0	11	–	2
Monmouth	6	–	1	7	–	4
North Carolina A&T	3	–	4	5	–	6
North Alabama	3	–	4	3	–	8
Charleston Southern	3	–	4	4	–	6
Hampton	3	–	4	5	–	6
Robert Morris	3	–	5	4	–	6
Campbell	2	–	5	3	–	8
Gardner–Webb	2	–	5	4	–	7
$ – Conference champion; ^ – FCS playoff participant; Rankings from STATS Poll

The 2021 Gardner–Webb Runnin' Bulldogs football team represented Gardner–Webb University as a member of the Big South Conference during the 2021 NCAA Division I FCS football season. Led by second-year head coach Tre Lamb, the Runnin' Bulldogs compiled an overall record of 4–7 with a mark of 2–5 in conference play, placing in a three-way tie for seventh in the Big South. Gardner–Webb played home games at Ernest W. Spangler Stadium in Boiling Springs, North Carolina.

== Schedule ==
Date	Time	Opponent	Site	TV	Result	Attendance
September 4	6:00 p.m.	at Georgia Southern*	Paulson Stadium; Statesboro, GA	ESPN3	L 25–30	15,089
September 11	6:00 p.m.	at Charlotte*	Jerry Richardson Stadium; Charlotte, NC	ESPN3	L 10–38	12,274
September 18	6:00 p.m.	Lincoln (PA)*	Ernest W. Spangler Stadium; Boiling Springs, NC	ESPN+	W 56–0	3,190
September 25	6:00 p.m.	Western Carolina*	Ernest W. Spangler Stadium; Boiling Springs, NC	ESPN+	W 52–34	5,689
October 2	1:00 p.m.	at Monmouth	Kessler Stadium; West Long Branch, NJ	ESPN+	L 17–54	3,278
October 9	6:00 p.m.	Campbell	Ernest W. Spangler Stadium; Boiling Springs, NC	ESPN+	L 28–42	4,150
October 23	1:30 p.m.	Robert Morris	Ernest W. Spangler Stadium; Boiling Springs, NC	ESPN+, Nexstar	W 28-17	4,529
October 30	1:00 p.m.	at No. 12 Kennesaw State	Fifth Third Bank Stadium; Kennesaw, GA	ESPN+	L 30-34	4,041
November 6	1:00 p.m.	at Hampton	Armstrong Stadium; Hampton, VA	ESPN+, Nexstar	L 21-27 ^{OT}	2,802
November 13	1:30 p.m.	Charleston Southern	Ernest W. Spangler Stadium; Boiling Springs, NC	ESPN3	L 24-32	3,150
November 20	1:00 p.m.	at North Carolina A&T	Truist Stadium; Greensboro, NC	ESPN3	W 35-27	11,240
*Non-conference game; Rankings from STATS Poll released prior to the game; All times are in Eastern time
